= Rafael Nadal career statistics =

Statistics of professional tennis player

Career finals
Discipline	Type	Won	Lost	Total
Singles
Singles	Grand Slam	22	8	30
Singles	ATP Finals	0	2	2
Singles	ATP 1000	36	17	53
Singles	ATP 500	23	6	29
Singles	ATP 250	10	6	16
Singles	Olympics	1	0	1
Singles	Total	92	39	131
Doubles
Doubles	Grand Slam	–	–	–
Doubles	ATP Finals	–	–	–
Doubles	ATP 1000	3	0	3
Doubles	ATP 500	1	2	3
Doubles	ATP 250	6	2	8
Doubles	Olympics	1	0	1
Doubles	Total	11	4	15

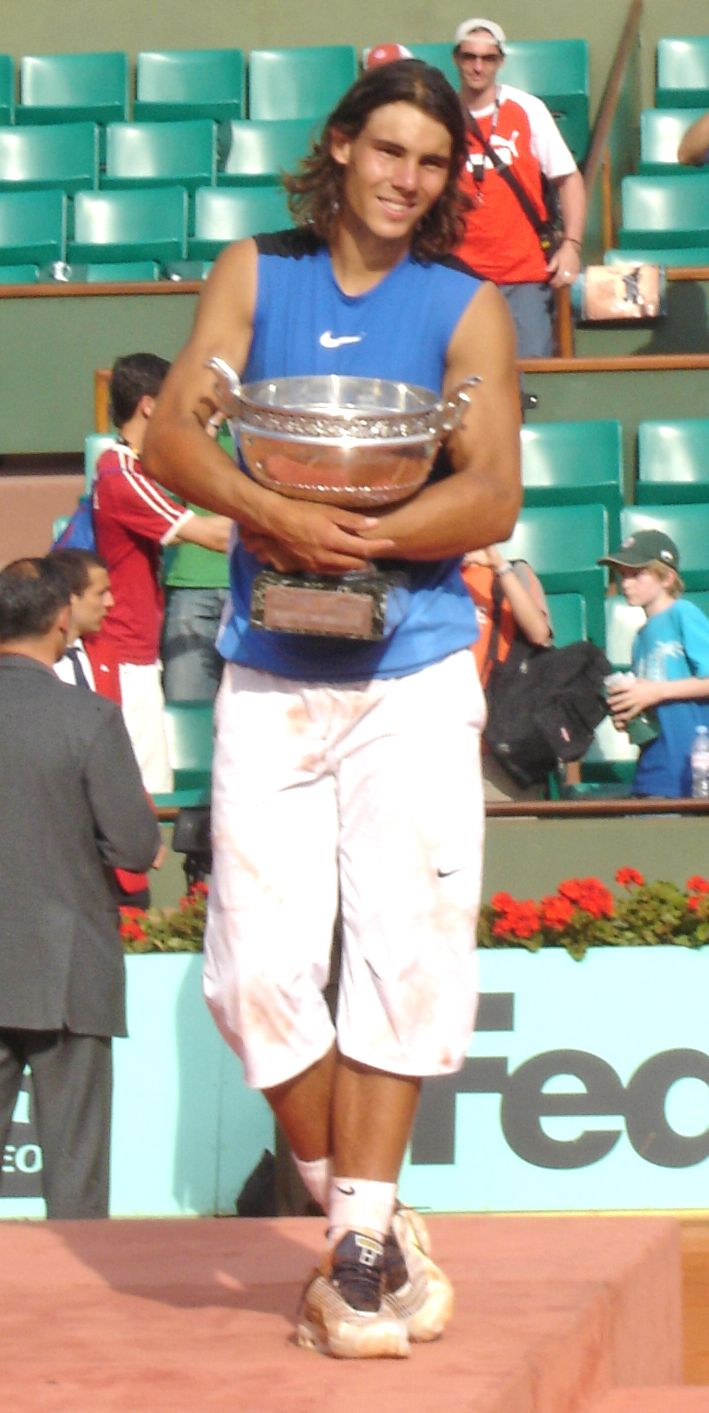
Rafael Nadal in 2006

This is a list of the main career statistics of former professional tennis player Rafael Nadal. All statistics are according to the ATP Tour website. To date, Nadal has won 92 ATP singles titles, including 22 Grand Slam men's singles titles and 36 ATP Tour Masters 1000 titles. He is one of three men to achieve the Career Golden Slam in men's singles, with titles at all four majors and the Olympic singles gold. He is the first man in history to win Grand Slam singles titles on three different surfaces in a calendar year (Surface Slam) and is the second youngest (24 years, 3 months and 10 days) in the Open Era to achieve the Career Grand Slam and the Career Golden Slam. He is the fourth man in history to complete the double Career Grand Slam in singles, after Roy Emerson, Rod Laver, and Novak Djokovic. He is the first man to win multiple majors and rank world No. 1 in three different decades.

Representing Spain, Nadal has won two Olympic gold medals including a singles gold at the 2008 Beijing Olympics and a doubles gold at the 2016 Rio Olympics. In the process, he became the first male player in history to complete the Career Grand Slam and win Olympic gold medals in both singles and doubles. He has led Spain to five Davis Cup titles in 2004, 2008, 2009, 2011, and 2019. He has won the 2017 and 2019 editions of the Laver Cup with Team Europe.

== Significant achievements ==
Nadal has been the most successful player in history on clay courts. He has a 63–9 record in clay court tournament finals and has lost only four times in best-of-five-set matches on clay. He has won 14 French Open titles (14–0 in finals), 12 Barcelona Open titles (12–0 in finals), 11 Monte-Carlo Masters titles (11–1 in finals), and 10 Rome Masters titles (10–2 in finals). In those four tournaments, Nadal made a total of 50 finals, winning 47 of them. The 3 losses were 2013 Monte Carlo, and 2011/2014 Rome finals, all to Djokovic. His 9th French Open crown in 2014 made him the first man in the Open Era to win a single tournament more than 8 times, breaking a 32-year record held by Guillermo Vilas, who won 8 Buenos Aires titles between 1973 and 1982. He subsequently won a ninth title at three more tournaments; 2016 Monte Carlo, 2016 Barcelona, and the 2019 Italian Open. On 23 April 2017, Nadal became the first man in the Open Era to win 10 titles at the same tournament, the 2017 Monte Carlos Masters, a feat he would repeat two more times that year at Barcelona and the French Open. By the end of the 2022 season, Nadal would be the sole record-holder for most titles at a single tournament at the Grand Slam (14 French Open), Masters 1000 (11 Monte Carlo), and ATP 500 (12 Barcelona) levels.

He also holds the longest single-surface win streak in the Open Era, having won 81 consecutive matches on clay between April 2005 and May 2007. Nadal has never been taken to five sets in 14 French Open finals, and only lost consecutive matches on clay once since the start of his professional career, at the 2024 French Open. He is regarded universally by tennis critics and top players as the greatest clay-court player of all time. Nadal's 14 French Open titles are a record for one player (male or female) at a single major, surpassing the old record of 11 Australian Open titles won by Margaret Court. Nadal is the only player to defeat Roger Federer in the finals of three different Grand Slam tournaments as well as on three different surfaces (2009 Australian Open on hard court, 2006 French Open on clay court, and 2008 Wimbledon on grass court). Nadal is also the only player to beat Djokovic in multiple finals at two different grand slams, defeating him 3 times at the French Open (2012, 2014, and 2020) and 2 times at the US Open (2010 & 2013), accounting for 5 of Djokovic’s 13 losses in grand slam finals. He has won six hard-court majors (two Australian Open & four US Open titles), tied with Andre Agassi for the fourth-most in the Open Era, behind Pete Sampras (7), Federer (11) and Novak Djokovic (14).

Nadal is the only player to win four Grand Slam titles without dropping a set (2008, 2010, 2017 and 2020 French Opens) surpassing the prior record of three held by Björn Borg. He is also the first player, male or female, to win 100 matches at the French Open and holds the all-time record for the most match wins at a single major, with 112 at the French Open. He is the only player, male or female, to record three streaks of four or more consecutive titles at a single major in their career (2005–2008, 2010–2014 and 2017–2020 French Open). He has won the most ATP titles (30 titles) without dropping a set, with 26 of these titles won on clay courts and 4 on hard courts.

Nadal is the sixth player to be ranked ATP world No. 1 for more than 200 weeks. Nadal qualified for the ATP Finals for a record 16 consecutive years (2005–2020).

Nadal is the third male player to win over US$100 million in prize money after Djokovic and Federer.

Nadal won five straight French Open singles titles from 2010 to 2014 to become the only player in the tournament's history to win 5 consecutive singles titles, breaking the previous record of 4 titles held by Paul Aymé and Borg. In 2017, by winning his 10th French Open title, Nadal became the first man to win a milestone 10 titles at the same major. He has played 32 matches against his primary rivals — Federer and Djokovic — in majors and leads 21–11 (10–4 vs Federer and 11–7 vs Djokovic). He is 14–2 on clay and 7–9 off clay against them.

In 2018, Nadal became the first player, male or female, to amass 450+ match wins on both hard and clay courts, with 518 and 484 wins respectively. His 518 hard court wins and 1080 total match wins ranks him No. 4 on both lists in the Open Era. His 1000+ total match wins have only been achieved by four other players in the Open Era (Connors, Federer, Djokovic, and Lendl). He holds the record for winning at least one Grand Slam title in 10 consecutive years (2005–14) breaking the previous record of 8 consecutive years held by Borg, Sampras and Federer. He also holds the record for most years (15) winning at least one Grand Slam title (2005–14, 2017–20, 2022).

In 2008, Nadal became the second Spanish man to win Wimbledon. Nadal is one of only two male players in history to have won the French Open and Wimbledon in the same year at least twice, after Rod Laver and Borg. In 2009, Nadal became the first Spaniard to win the Australian Open.

He is also the first of two male players to win three consecutive Grand Slam tournaments on three different surfaces (clay, grass, and hard courts) in the same year (2010), a feat later achieved by Djokovic (2021). By winning the 2010 US Open, Nadal completed a men's singles Career Grand Slam at the age of 24 years, 3 months and 10 days, making him the youngest in the Open Era to do so. He is the 7th male player in history to achieve this feat.

He is the only male player to win the French Open and the US Open in the same year four times (2010, 2013, 2017, 2019).

Nadal has won 36 ATP Masters 1000 titles, the second-most since the start of the category in 1990, and reached 53 finals, and a record 99 quarter-finals.

== Performance timelines ==
Key
W	F	SF	QF	#R	RR	Q#	P#	DNQ	A	Z#	PO	G	S	B	NMS	NTI	P	NH

(W) winner; (F) finalist; (SF) semifinalist; (QF) quarterfinalist; (#R) rounds 4, 3, 2, 1; (RR) round-robin stage; (Q#) qualification round; (P#) preliminary round; (DNQ) did not qualify; (A) absent; (Z#) Davis/Fed Cup Zonal Group (with number indication) or (PO) play-off; (G) gold, (S) silver or (B) bronze Olympic/Paralympic medal; (NMS) not a Masters tournament; (NTI) not a Tier I tournament; (P) postponed; (NH) not held; (SR) strike rate (events won / competed); (W–L) win–loss record.
To avoid confusion and double counting, these charts are updated at the conclusion of a tournament or when the player's participation has ended.

Davis Cup, Laver Cup, ATP Cup, United Cup and World Team Cup matches are included in the statistics. Walkovers are neither official wins nor official losses.

=== Singles ===
Tournament	2001	2002	2003	2004	2005	2006	2007	2008	2009	2010	2011	2012	2013	2014	2015	2016	2017	2018	2019	2020	2021	2022	2023	2024	SR	W–L	Win %
Grand Slam tournaments
Australian Open	A	A	A	3R	4R	A	QF	SF	W	QF	QF	F	A	F	QF	1R	F	QF	F	QF	QF	W	2R	A	2 / 18	77–16	83%
French Open (details)	A	A	A	A	W	W	W	W	4R	W	W	W	W	W	QF	3R*	W	W	W	W	SF	W	A	1R	14 / 19	112–4	97%
Wimbledon	A	A	3R	A	2R	F	F	W	A	W	F	2R	1R	4R	2R	A	4R	SF	SF	NH	A	SF*	A	A	2 / 15	58–12	83%
US Open	A	A	2R	2R	3R	QF	4R	SF	SF	W	F	A	W	A	3R	4R	W	SF	W	A	A	4R	A	A	4 / 16	67–12	85%
Win–loss	0–0	0–0	3–2	3–2	13–3	17–2	20–3	24–2	15–2	25–1	23–3	14–2	14–1	16–2	11–4	5–2	23–2	21–3	24–2	11–1	9–2	22–1	1–1	0–1	22 / 68	314–44	88%
Year-end championship
ATP Finals	did not qualify				A	SF	SF	A	RR	F	RR	A	F	A	SF	A	RR	A	RR	SF	DNQ	RR	DNQ		0 / 11	21–18	54%
National representation
Olympics	not held			A	not held			G	not held			A	not held			4th	not held				A	NH		2R	1 / 3	11–3	79%
Davis Cup	A	A	A	W	1R	PO	A	W+	W	A	W	A	PO	A	Z1	PO	A	SF	W	NH	A	A	A	QF	5 / 12	29–2	94%
ATP 1000 tournaments
Indian Wells Open	A	A	A	3R	A	SF	W	SF	W	SF	F	SF	W	3R	QF	SF	4R	A	SF	NH	A	F	A	A	3 / 15	59–11	84%
Miami Open	A	A	A	4R	F	2R	QF	F	QF	SF	F	SF	A	F	3R	2R	F	A	A	NH	A	A	A	A	0 / 13	40–12	77%
Monte-Carlo Masters	A	A	3R	A	W	W	W	W	W	W	W	W	F	QF	SF	W	W	W	SF	NH	QF	A	A	A	11 / 17	73–6	92%
Madrid Open^{1}	A	A	3R	A	A	A	F	W	F	W	F	3R	W	W	F	SF	W	QF	SF	NH	QF	QF	A	4R	5 / 17	57–12	83%
Italian Open	A	A	A	A	W	W	W	2R	W	W	F	W	W	F	QF	QF	QF	W	W	QF	W	3R	A	2R	10 / 19	70–9	89%
Canadian Open	A	A	A	1R	W	3R	SF	W	QF	SF	2R	A	W	A	QF	A	3R	W	W	NH	A	A	A	A	5 / 13	38–8	83%
Cincinnati Open	A	A	A	1R	1R	QF	2R	SF	SF	QF	QF	A	W	A	3R	3R	QF	A	A	A	A	2R	A	A	1 / 13	22–12	65%
Shanghai Masters^{2}	A	A	1R	2R	W	QF	QF	SF	F	3R	3R	A	SF	2R	SF	2R	F	A	A	NH			A	A	1 / 14	29–13	69%
Paris Masters	A	A	Q1	A	A	A	F	QF	SF	A	A	A	SF	A	QF	A	QF	A	SF	SF	A	2R	A	A	0 / 9	22–7	76%
Win–loss	0–0	0–0	4–3	5–5	28–2	23–5	31–6	32–6	34–6	29–5	25–7	19–2	35–3	16–5	21–9	15–6	28–6	17–1	22–2	5–2	9–2	8–5	0–0	4–2	36 / 130	410–90	82%
Career statistics
Tournament	2001	2002	2003	2004	2005	2006	2007	2008	2009	2010	2011	2012	2013	2014	2015	2016	2017	2018	2019	2020	2021	2022	2023	2024	SR	W–L	Win %
Tournaments^{3}	0	1	11	18	21	16	20	19	17	17	17	11	17	15	23	16	18	9	13	6	7	12	1	7	Career total: 312		
Titles	0	0	0	1	11	5	6	8	5	7	3	4	10	4	3	2	6	5	4	2	2	4	0	0	Career total: 92		
Finals	0	0	0	2	12	6	9	10	8	9	10	5	14	7	6	3	10	5	5	2	2	5	0	1	Career total: 131		
Hard win–loss	0–0	0–0	1–2	14–10	28–6	25–10	31–12	46–10	42–12	40–9	33–11	17–3	36–4	20–6	30–12	18–10	41–10	14–2	32–3	18–6	5–2	24–6	1–3	2–2	25 / 166	518–151	77%
Clay win–loss	0–0	1–1	11–6	14–3	50–2	26–0	31–1	24–1	24–2	22–0	28–2	23–1	39–2	25–3	26–6	21–4	24–1	26–1	21–3	9–1	19–3	10–2	0–0	10–6	63 / 116	484–51	90%
Grass win–loss	0–0	0–0	2–1	0–0	1–2	8–2	8–2	12–0	0–0	9–1	8–2	2–2	0–1	3–2	5–2	0–0	3–1	5–1	5–1	0–0	0–0	5–0	0–0	0–0	4 / 25	76–20	79%
Carpet win–loss	0–0	0–0	0–2	2–4	0–0	0–0	0–0	0–0	discontinued																0 / 5	2–6	25%
Overall win–loss^{4}	0–0	1–1	14–11	30–17	79–10	59–12	70–15	82–11	66–14	71–10	69–15	42–6	75–7	48–11	61–20	39–14	68–12	45–4	58–7	27–7	24–5	39–8	1–3	12–8	92 / 312	1080–228	83%
Win %	–	50%	56%	64%	89%	83%	82%	88%	83%	88%	82%	88%	91%	81%	75%	74%	85%	92%	89%	79%	83%	83%	25%	60%	83%		
Year-end ranking	811	200	49	51	2	2	2	1	2	1	2	4	1	3	5	9	1	2	1	2	6	2	670	153	$134,946,100		

* Nadal withdrew before the third round of the 2016 French Open due to a wrist injury, and before the semi-finals of 2022 Wimbledon due to an abdominal tear which do not officially count as losses.
+ Did not participate in the 2008 Davis Cup Final.
^{1} Held as Hamburg Masters (clay) until 2008, Madrid Masters (clay) since 2009.
^{2} Held as Stuttgart Masters (indoor hardcourt) in 2001, Madrid Masters (indoor hardcourt) from 2002 to 2008, Shanghai Masters (outdoor hardcourt) since 2009.
^{3} Including appearances in Grand Slam and ATP World Tour main draw matches and in Summer Olympics.
^{4} Including matches in Grand Slam, in ATP Tour, in Summer Olympics, in Davis Cup, Laver Cup, ATP Cup and the United Cup.
^{5} Postponed to 2021 due to the coronavirus pandemic.

=== Doubles ===
Tournament	2002	2003	2004	2005	2006	2007	2008	2009	2010	2011	2012	2013	2014	2015	2016	2017	2018	2019	2020	2021	2022	2023	2024	SR	W–L	Win%
Grand Slam tournaments
Australian Open	A	3R	3R	A	A	A	A	A	A	A	A	A	A	A	A	A	A	A	A	A	A	A	A	0 / 2	4–2	67%
French Open	A	A	A	A	A	A	A	A	A	A	A	A	A	A	A	A	A	A	A	A	A	A	A	0 / 0	0–0	–
Wimbledon	A	A	A	2R	A	A	A	A	A	A	A	A	A	A	A	A	A	A	NH	A	A	A	A	0 / 1	1–0	100%
US Open	A	1R	SF	A	A	A	A	A	A	A	A	A	A	A	A	A	A	A	A	A	A	A	A	0 / 2	4–2	67%
Win–loss	0–0	0–1	6–2	3–1	0–0	0–0	0–0	0–0	0–0	0–0	0–0	0–0	0–0	0–0	0–0	0–0	0–0	0–0	0–0	0–0	0–0	0–0	0–0	0 / 5	9–4	69%
National representation
Summer Olympics	not held		1R	not held			2R	not held			A	not held			G	not held				A	NH		QF	1 / 4	8–3	73%
Davis Cup	A	A	W	1R	PO	A	W*	W	A	W	A	PO	A	Z1	PO	A	SF	W	NH	A	A	A	A	5 / 10	8–4	67%
ATP 1000 tournaments
Indian Wells Open	A	A	QF	A	2R	1R	1R	2R	W	SF	W	A	A	QF	1R	2R	A	A	A	A	A	A	A	2 / 11	20–8	71%
Miami Open	A	A	2R	QF	A	A	1R	2R	1R	A	2R	A	A	A	2R	A	A	A	A	A	A	A	A	0 / 7	6–5	55%
Monte-Carlo Masters	A	A	A	A	A	1R	W	A	A	A	A	A	A	A	2R	A	A	A	A	A	A	A	A	1 / 3	6–1	86%
Italian Open	A	A	A	A	A	QF	A	A	A	A	A	A	A	A	A	A	A	A	A	A	A	A	A	0 / 1	2–1	67%
Madrid Open^{1}	A	A	A	A	A	A	A	A	A	A	A	A	A	A	A	A	A	A	A	A	A	A	A	0 / 0	0–0	–
Canadian Open	A	A	A	2R	2R	2R	1R	2R	1R	1R	A	2R	A	QF	A	A	A	A	A	A	A	A	A	0 / 9	7–6	54%
Cincinnati Open	A	A	A	A	2R	A	A	A	A	2R	A	A	A	A	A	A	A	A	A	A	A	A	A	0 / 2	2–2	50%
Shanghai Masters^{2}	A	A	1R	A	1R	1R	2R	A	A	1R	A	A	A	A	A	A	A	A	A	A	A	A	A	0 / 5	1–4	20%
Paris Masters	A	A	A	A	A	1R	QF	1R	A	A	A	A	A	1R	A	A	A	A	A	A	A	A	A	0 / 4	2–3	40%
Win–loss	0–0	0–0	3–2	3–1	3–3	3–5	8–3	3–4	5–2	4–4	6–1	1–0	0–0	4–3	2–1	1–1	0–0	0–0	0–0	0–0	0–0	0–0	0–0	3 / 42	46–30	60%
Career statistics
Tournament	2002	2003	2004	2005	2006	2007	2008	2009	2010	2011	2012	2013	2014	2015	2016	2017	2018	2019	2020	2021	2022	2023	2024	SR	W–L	Win%
Tournaments	1	7	11	10	6	9	11	6	5	6	3	3	2	9	6	1	0	0	0	0	1	0	3	Career total: 100		
Titles	0	1	1	1	0	0	1	1	1	1	1	0	0	1	2	0	0	0	0	0	0	0	0	Career total: 11		
Finals	0	1	1	2	0	2	1	1	1	1	1	1	0	1	2	0	0	0	0	0	0	0	0	Career total: 15		
Hard W–L	0–0	0–1	15–6	9–3	4–3	4–4	6–6	7–5	5–3	8–4	6–1	1–0	1–2	10–4	11–2	2–2	0–0	3–1	2–0	0–0	1–1	0–0	0–1	9 / 65	95–49	66%
Clay W–L	0–1	5–3	4–3	9–5	1–0	6–3	5–0	0–0	0–0	0–0	0–0	5–1	0–0	1–2	1–0	0–0	0–0	0–0	0–0	0–0	0–0	0–0	4–1	2 / 22	41–19	68%
Grass W–L	0–0	0–0	0–0	1–0	0–1	0–1	0–1	0–0	1–0	1–1	1–0	0–0	0–0	2–1	0–0	0–0	0–0	0–0	0–0	0–0	0–0	0–0	0–0	0 / 10	6–5	55%
Carpet W–L	0–0	0–2	0–2	0–0	0–0	0–0	0–0	discontinued																0 / 3	0–4	0%
Overall win–loss	0–1	5–6	19–11	19–8	5–4	10–8	11–7	7–5	6–3	9–5	7–1	6–1	1–2	13–7	12–2	2–2	0–0	3–1	2–0	0–0	1–1	0–0	4–2	11 / 100	142–77	65%
Win %	0%	45%	63%	70%	56%	56%	61%	58%	67%	64%	86%	86%	33%	65%	86%	50%	–	75%	100%	–	50%	–	67%	65%		
Year-end ranking	–	–	–	49	–	119	92	132	79	113	68	384	805	88	132	542	–	–	475	511	1159	–	853			

^{1} Held as Hamburg Masters (clay) until 2008, Madrid Masters (clay) since 2009.
^{2} Held as Stuttgart Masters (indoor hardcourt) in 2001, Madrid Masters (indoor hardcourt) from 2002 to 2008, Shanghai Masters (outdoor hardcourt) since 2009.

== Grand Slam tournament finals ==
Nadal's 22 Grand Slam singles titles place him second in the men's all-time rankings, behind Djokovic's 24 titles. His 30 Grand Slam singles finals place him 3rd in the men's all-time rankings, behind Djokovic's 38 and Federer's 31 finals, respectively. He has won 14 French Open titles, an all-time record at any tournament. He was also the youngest player in the Open Era to win all four majors (24 years old) until his compatriot Carlos Alcaraz completed the feat at 22 years old in 2026. In doing so, Alcaraz also broke Nadal's record for the number of majors competed in before achieving the Career Grand Slam; Nadal took 20 campaigns, while Alcaraz took 12.

=== Grand Slam tournament finals: 30 (22 titles, 8 runner-ups) ===
Result	Year	Tournament	Surface	Opponent	Score
Win	2005	French Open	Clay	(Argentina) Mariano Puerta	6–7^{(6–8)}, 6–3, 6–1, 7–5
Win	2006	French Open (2)	Clay	(Switzerland) Roger Federer	1–6, 6–1, 6–4, 7–6^{(7–4)}
Loss	2006	Wimbledon	Grass	(Switzerland) Roger Federer	0–6, 6–7^{(5–7)}, 7–6^{(7–2)}, 3–6
Win	2007	French Open (3)	Clay	(Switzerland) Roger Federer (2)	6–3, 4–6, 6–3, 6–4
Loss	2007	Wimbledon	Grass	(Switzerland) Roger Federer	6–7^{(7–9)}, 6–4, 6–7^{(3–7)}, 6–2, 2–6
Win	2008	French Open (4)	Clay	(Switzerland) Roger Federer (3)	6–1, 6–3, 6–0
Win	2008	Wimbledon	Grass	(Switzerland) Roger Federer (4)	6–4, 6–4, 6–7^{(5–7)}, 6–7^{(8–10)}, 9–7
Win	2009	Australian Open	Hard	(Switzerland) Roger Federer (5)	7–5, 3–6, 7–6^{(7–3)}, 3–6, 6–2
Win	2010	French Open (5)	Clay	(Sweden) Robin Söderling	6–4, 6–2, 6–4
Win	2010	Wimbledon (2)	Grass	(Czech Republic) Tomáš Berdych	6–3, 7–5, 6–4
Win	2010	US Open	Hard	(Serbia) Novak Djokovic	6–4, 5–7, 6–4, 6–2
Win	2011	French Open (6)	Clay	(Switzerland) Roger Federer (6)	7–5, 7–6^{(7–3)}, 5–7, 6–1
Loss	2011	Wimbledon	Grass	(Serbia) Novak Djokovic	4–6, 1–6, 6–1, 3–6
Loss	2011	US Open	Hard	(Serbia) Novak Djokovic	2–6, 4–6, 7–6^{(7–3)}, 1–6
Loss	2012	Australian Open	Hard	(Serbia) Novak Djokovic	7–5, 4–6, 2–6, 7–6^{(7–5)}, 5–7
Win	2012	French Open (7)	Clay	(Serbia) Novak Djokovic	6–4, 6–3, 2–6, 7–5
Win	2013	French Open (8)	Clay	(Spain) David Ferrer	6–3, 6–2, 6–3
Win	2013	US Open (2)	Hard	(Serbia) Novak Djokovic	6–2, 3–6, 6–4, 6–1
Loss	2014	Australian Open	Hard	(Switzerland) Stan Wawrinka	3–6, 2–6, 6–3, 3–6
Win	2014	French Open (9)	Clay	(Serbia) Novak Djokovic	3–6, 7–5, 6–2, 6–4
Loss	2017	Australian Open	Hard	(Switzerland) Roger Federer	4–6, 6–3, 1–6, 6–3, 3–6
Win	2017	French Open (10)	Clay	(Switzerland) Stan Wawrinka	6–2, 6–3, 6–1
Win	2017	US Open (3)	Hard	(South Africa) Kevin Anderson	6–3, 6–3, 6–4
Win	2018	French Open (11)	Clay	(Austria) Dominic Thiem	6–4, 6–3, 6–2
Loss	2019	Australian Open	Hard	(Serbia) Novak Djokovic	3–6, 2–6, 3–6
Win	2019	French Open (12)	Clay	(Austria) Dominic Thiem	6–3, 5–7, 6–1, 6–1
Win	2019	US Open (4)	Hard	(Russia) Daniil Medvedev	7–5, 6–3, 5–7, 4–6, 6–4
Win	2020	French Open (13)	Clay	(Serbia) Novak Djokovic	6–0, 6–2, 7–5
Win	2022	Australian Open (2)	Hard	(Russia) Daniil Medvedev	2–6, 6–7^{(5–7)}, 6–4, 6–4, 7–5
Win	2022	French Open (14)	Clay	(Norway) Casper Ruud	6–3, 6–3, 6–0

=== Career Grand Slam tournament seedings ===
The tournaments won by Nadal are in boldface.

- Nadal has been seeded 1st in 16 Grand Slam tournaments, with 4 of those being consecutive.
- He had been seeded 1st or 2nd for 14 consecutive grand slams.
- He was seeded 1st, 2nd, 3rd, or 4th in 29 consecutive tournaments in which he played, this streak ran from his first grand slam title, the 2005 French Open, to his when he won his 12th grand slam title, the 2013 French Open, a span of 8 consecutive years. It would have stretched further except that after he won the 2013 French Open title, he dropped from No. 4 to No. 5 in the world.
- In the first 20 of his 22 grand slam titles, he was seeded 1st, 2nd, 3rd, or 4th (in the 21st, 2022 Australian Open, he was 6th, while in the 22nd, 2022 French Open, he was 5th).
- Of his 8 runner-up finishes, he was seeded either 1st and 2nd in 7 of them; the only one in which he wasn't a top-2 seed was the 2017 Australian Open, where he was seeded 9th.
- (DNP) Prior 2009 Wimbledon Championships Nadal seeded 1st, but withdrew from the tournament due to knee tendinitis.

Legend seeded No. 1 (**6** / 15) seeded No. 2 (**11** / 28) seeded No. 3 (**1** / 5) seeded No. 4–10 (**4** / 14) seeded No. 11–32 (0 / 0) not seeded (0 / 6)	Longest / total: 4 (x2) / 68; 10 / 68; 1 / 68; 5 / 68; 0 / 68; 3 / 68

Year	Australian Open	French Open	Wimbledon	US Open
2003	did not play	did not play	not seeded	not seeded
2004	not seeded	did not play	did not play	not seeded
2005	not seeded	**4th**	4th	2nd
2006	did not play	**2nd**	2nd	2nd
2007	2nd	**2nd**	2nd	2nd
2008	2nd	**2nd**	**2nd**	1st
2009	**1st**	1st	1st (DNP)	3rd
2010	2nd	**2nd**	**2nd**	**1st**
2011	1st	**1st**	1st	2nd
2012	2nd	**2nd**	2nd	did not play
2013	did not play	**3rd**	5th	**2nd**
2014	1st	**1st**	2nd	did not play
2015	3rd	6th	10th	8th
2016	5th	4th	did not play	4th
2017	9th	**4th**	4th	**1st**
2018	1st	**1st**	2nd	1st
2019	2nd	**2nd**	3rd	**2nd**
2020	1st	**2nd**	tournament cancelled*	did not play
2021	2nd	3rd	did not play	did not play
2022	**6th**	**5th**	2nd	2nd
2023	1st	did not play	did not play	did not play
2024	did not play	protected ranking	did not play	did not play

* Due to the COVID-19 pandemic, the 2020 Wimbledon Championships of the tournament was cancelled.

== Other significant finals ==
=== Year-end championship finals: 2 (2 runner-ups) ===
Result	Year	Tournament	Surface	Opponent	Score
Loss	2010	ATP Finals	Hard (i)	(Switzerland) Roger Federer	3–6, 6–3, 1–6
Loss	2013	ATP Finals	Hard (i)	(Serbia) Novak Djokovic	3–6, 4–6

=== Masters 1000 finals ===
==== Singles: 53 (36 titles, 17 runner-ups) ====
Finals by surface
Hard (10–10)
Clay (26–7)

Nadal has won 36 Masters 1000 titles, four behind Novak Djokovic. He has had the longest run of consecutive years with at least one Masters 1000 title (10). He and Djokovic are the only players in history to win at least five Masters 1000 titles at four separate events (Monte Carlo – 11, Rome – 10, Madrid – 5, Canada – 5). He has reached the final of each tournament, including Hamburg, which is no longer a Masters level event. Nadal is the only man to win a Masters 1000 tournament more than seven times, with his eleven Monte Carlo and ten Rome titles.

Result	Year	Tournament	Surface	Opponent	Score
Loss	2005	Miami Open	Hard	(Switzerland) Roger Federer	6–2, 7–6^{(7–4)}, 6–7^{(5–7)}, 3–6, 1–6
Win	2005	Monte-Carlo Masters	Clay	(Argentina) Guillermo Coria	6–3, 6–1, 0–6, 7–5
Win	2005	Italian Open	Clay	(Argentina) Guillermo Coria (2)	6–4, 3–6, 6–3, 4–6, 7–6^{(8–6)}
Win	2005	Canadian Open	Hard	(United States) Andre Agassi	6–3, 4–6, 6–2
Win	2005	Madrid Open	Hard (i)	(Croatia) Ivan Ljubičić	3–6, 2–6, 6–3, 6–4, 7–6^{(7–3)}
Win	2006	Monte-Carlo Masters (2)	Clay	(Switzerland) Roger Federer	6–2, 6–7^{(2–7)}, 6–3, 7–6^{(7–5)}
Win	2006	Italian Open (2)	Clay	(Switzerland) Roger Federer (2)	6–7^{(0–7)}, 7–6^{(7–5)}, 6–4, 2–6, 7–6^{(7–5)}
Win	2007	Indian Wells Open	Hard	(Serbia) Novak Djokovic	6–2, 7–5
Win	2007	Monte-Carlo Masters (3)	Clay	(Switzerland) Roger Federer (3)	6–4, 6–4
Win	2007	Italian Open (3)	Clay	(Chile) Fernando González	6–2, 6–2
Loss	2007	German Open	Clay	(Switzerland) Roger Federer	6–2, 2–6, 0–6
Loss	2007	Paris Masters	Hard (i)	(Argentina) David Nalbandian	4–6, 0–6
Loss	2008	Miami Open	Hard	(Russia) Nikolay Davydenko	4–6, 2–6
Win	2008	Monte-Carlo Masters (4)	Clay	(Switzerland) Roger Federer (4)	7–5, 7–5
Win	2008	German Open	Clay	(Switzerland) Roger Federer (5)	7–5, 6–7^{(3–7)}, 6–3
Win	2008	Canadian Open (2)	Hard	(Germany) Nicolas Kiefer	6–3, 6–2
Win	2009	Indian Wells Open (2)	Hard	(United Kingdom) Andy Murray	6–1, 6–2
Win	2009	Monte-Carlo Masters (5)	Clay	(Serbia) Novak Djokovic (2)	6–3, 2–6, 6–1
Win	2009	Italian Open (4)	Clay	(Serbia) Novak Djokovic (3)	7–6^{(7–2)}, 6–2
Loss	2009	Madrid Open	Clay	(Switzerland) Roger Federer	4–6, 4–6
Loss	2009	Shanghai Masters	Hard	(Russia) Nikolay Davydenko	6–7^{(3–7)}, 3–6
Win	2010	Monte-Carlo Masters (6)	Clay	(Spain) Fernando Verdasco	6–0, 6–1
Win	2010	Italian Open (5)	Clay	(Spain) David Ferrer	7–5, 6–2
Win	2010	Madrid Open (2)	Clay	(Switzerland) Roger Federer (6)	6–4, 7–6^{(7–5)}
Loss	2011	Indian Wells Open	Hard	(Serbia) Novak Djokovic	6–4, 3–6, 2–6
Loss	2011	Miami Open	Hard	(Serbia) Novak Djokovic	6–4, 3–6, 6–7^{(4–7)}
Win	2011	Monte-Carlo Masters (7)	Clay	(Spain) David Ferrer (2)	6–4, 7–5
Loss	2011	Madrid Open	Clay	(Serbia) Novak Djokovic	5–7, 4–6
Loss	2011	Italian Open	Clay	(Serbia) Novak Djokovic	4–6, 4–6
Win	2012	Monte-Carlo Masters (8)	Clay	(Serbia) Novak Djokovic (4)	6–3, 6–1
Win	2012	Italian Open (6)	Clay	(Serbia) Novak Djokovic (5)	7–5, 6–3
Win	2013	Indian Wells Open (3)	Hard	(Argentina) Juan Martín del Potro	4–6, 6–3, 6–4
Loss	2013	Monte-Carlo Masters	Clay	(Serbia) Novak Djokovic	2–6, 6–7^{(1–7)}
Win	2013	Madrid Open (3)	Clay	(Switzerland) Stanislas Wawrinka	6–2, 6–4
Win	2013	Italian Open (7)	Clay	(Switzerland) Roger Federer (7)	6–1, 6–3
Win	2013	Canadian Open (3)	Hard	(Canada) Milos Raonic	6–2, 6–2
Win	2013	Cincinnati Open	Hard	(United States) John Isner	7–6^{(10–8)}, 7–6^{(7–3)}
Loss	2014	Miami Open	Hard	(Serbia) Novak Djokovic	3–6, 3–6
Win	2014	Madrid Open (4)	Clay	(Japan) Kei Nishikori	2–6, 6–4, 3–0 ret.
Loss	2014	Italian Open	Clay	(Serbia) Novak Djokovic	6–4, 3–6, 3–6
Loss	2015	Madrid Open	Clay	(United Kingdom) Andy Murray	3–6, 2–6
Win	2016	Monte-Carlo Masters (9)	Clay	(France) Gaël Monfils	7–5, 5–7, 6–0
Loss	2017	Miami Open	Hard	(Switzerland) Roger Federer	3–6, 4–6
Win	2017	Monte-Carlo Masters (10)	Clay	(Spain) Albert Ramos Viñolas	6–1, 6–3
Win	2017	Madrid Open (5)	Clay	(Austria) Dominic Thiem	7–6^{(10–8)}, 6–4
Loss	2017	Shanghai Masters	Hard	(Switzerland) Roger Federer	4–6, 3–6
Win	2018	Monte-Carlo Masters (11)	Clay	(Japan) Kei Nishikori (2)	6–3, 6–2
Win	2018	Italian Open (8)	Clay	(Germany) Alexander Zverev	6–1, 1–6, 6–3
Win	2018	Canadian Open (4)	Hard	(Greece) Stefanos Tsitsipas	6–2, 7–6^{(7–4)}
Win	2019	Italian Open (9)	Clay	(Serbia) Novak Djokovic (6)	6–0, 4–6, 6–1
Win	2019	Canadian Open (5)	Hard	(Russia) Daniil Medvedev	6–3, 6–0
Win	2021	Italian Open (10)	Clay	(Serbia) Novak Djokovic (7)	7–5, 1–6, 6–3
Loss	2022	Indian Wells Open	Hard	(United States) Taylor Fritz	3–6, 6–7^{(5–7)}

==== Doubles: 3 (3 titles) ====
Result	Year	Tournament	Surface	Partner	Opponent	Score
Win	2008	Monte-Carlo Masters	Clay	(Spain) Tommy Robredo	(India) Mahesh Bhupathi (The Bahamas) Mark Knowles	6–3, 6–3
Win	2010	Indian Wells Open	Hard	(Spain) Marc López	(Canada) Daniel Nestor (Serbia) Nenad Zimonjić	7–6^{(10–8)}, 6–3
Win	2012	Indian Wells Open (2)	Hard	(Spain) Marc López	(United States) John Isner (United States) Sam Querrey	6–2, 7–6^{(7–3)}

=== Olympic medal matches ===
==== Singles: 2 (1 Gold medal) ====
Result	Year	Tournament	Surface	Opponent	Score
Gold	2008	Beijing Olympics	Hard	(Chile) Fernando González	6–3, 7–6^{(7–2)}, 6–3
4th place	2016	Rio Olympics	Hard	(Japan) Kei Nishikori	2–6, 7–6^{(7–1)}, 3–6

==== Doubles: 1 (1 Gold medal) ====
Result	Year	Tournament	Surface	Partner	Opponents	Score
Gold	2016	Rio Olympics	Hard	(Spain) Marc López	(Romania) Florin Mergea (Romania) Horia Tecău	6–2, 3–6, 6–4

== ATP Tour career finals ==
=== Singles: 131 (92 titles, 39 runner-ups) ===
Legend Grand Slam (22–8) Olympic Games (1–0) ATP Finals (Tennis Masters Cup) (0–2) ATP 1000 (Masters) (36–17) ATP 500 (International Gold) (23–6) ATP 250 (International) (10–6)	Finals by surface Hard (25–27) Clay (63–9) Grass (4–3)	Finals by setting Outdoor (90–34) Indoor (2–5)

Result	W–L	Date	Tournament	Tier	Surface	Opponent	Score
Loss	0–1	Jan 2004	Auckland Open, New Zealand	International	Hard	(Slovakia) Dominik Hrbatý	6–4, 2–6, 5–7
Win	1–1	Aug 2004	Orange Prokom Open, Poland	International	Clay	(Argentina) José Acasuso	6–3, 6–4
Win	2–1	Feb 2005	Brasil Open, Brazil	International	Clay	(Spain) Alberto Martín	6–0, 6–7^{(2–7)}, 6–1
Win	3–1	Feb 2005	Mexican Open, Mexico	Intl. Gold	Clay	(Spain) Albert Montañés	6–1, 6–0
Loss	3–2	Apr 2005	Miami Open, United States	Masters	Hard	(Switzerland) Roger Federer	6–2, 7–6^{(7–4)}, 6–7^{(5–7)}, 3–6, 1–6
Win	4–2	Apr 2005	Monte-Carlo Masters, France	Masters	Clay	(Argentina) Guillermo Coria	6–3, 6–1, 0–6, 7–5
Win	5–2	Apr 2005	Barcelona Open, Spain	Intl. Gold	Clay	(Spain) Juan Carlos Ferrero	6–1, 7–6^{(7–4)}, 6–3
Win	6–2	May 2005	Italian Open, Italy	Masters	Clay	(Argentina) Guillermo Coria	6–4, 3–6, 6–3, 4–6, 7–6^{(8–6)}
Win	7–2	Jun 2005	French Open, France	Grand Slam	Clay	(Argentina) Mariano Puerta	6–7^{(6–8)}, 6–3, 6–1, 7–5
Win	8–2	Jul 2005	Swedish Open, Sweden	International	Clay	(Czech Republic) Tomáš Berdych	2–6, 6–2, 6–4
Win	9–2	Jul 2005	Stuttgart Open, Germany	Intl. Gold	Clay	(Argentina) Gastón Gaudio	6–3, 6–3, 6–4
Win	10–2	Aug 2005	Canadian Open, Canada	Masters	Hard	(United States) Andre Agassi	6–3, 4–6, 6–2
Win	11–2	Sep 2005	China Open, China	International	Hard	(Argentina) Guillermo Coria	5–7, 6–1, 6–2
Win	12–2	Oct 2005	Madrid Open, Spain	Masters	Hard (i)	(Croatia) Ivan Ljubičić	3–6, 2–6, 6–3, 6–4, 7–6^{(7–3)}
Win	13–2	Mar 2006	Dubai Championships, UAE	Intl. Gold	Hard	(Switzerland) Roger Federer	2–6, 6–4, 6–4
Win	14–2	Apr 2006	Monte-Carlo Masters, France (2)	Masters	Clay	(Switzerland) Roger Federer	6–2, 6–7^{(2–7)}, 6–3, 7–6^{(7–5)}
Win	15–2	Apr 2006	Barcelona Open, Spain (2)	Intl. Gold	Clay	(Spain) Tommy Robredo	6–4, 6–4, 6–0
Win	16–2	May 2006	Italian Open, Italy (2)	Masters	Clay	(Switzerland) Roger Federer	6–7^{(0–7)}, 7–6^{(7–5)}, 6–4, 2–6, 7–6^{(7–5)}
Win	17–2	June 2006	French Open, France (2)	Grand Slam	Clay	(Switzerland) Roger Federer	1–6, 6–1, 6–4, 7–6^{(7–4)}
Loss	17–3	July 2006	Wimbledon, United Kingdom	Grand Slam	Grass	(Switzerland) Roger Federer	0–6, 6–7^{(5–7)}, 7–6^{(7–2)}, 3–6
Win	18–3	Mar 2007	Indian Wells Open, United States	Masters	Hard	(Serbia) Novak Djokovic	6–2, 7–5
Win	19–3	Apr 2007	Monte-Carlo Masters, France (3)	Masters	Clay	(Switzerland) Roger Federer	6–4, 6–4
Win	20–3	Apr 2007	Barcelona Open, Spain (3)	Intl. Gold	Clay	(Argentina) Guillermo Cañas	6–3, 6–4
Win	21–3	May 2007	Italian Open, Italy (3)	Masters	Clay	(Chile) Fernando González	6–2, 6–2
Loss	21–4	May 2007	German Open, Germany	Masters	Clay	(Switzerland) Roger Federer	6–2, 2–6, 0–6
Win	22–4	Jun 2007	French Open, France (3)	Grand Slam	Clay	(Switzerland) Roger Federer	6–3, 4–6, 6–3, 6–4
Loss	22–5	Jul 2007	Wimbledon, United Kingdom	Grand Slam	Grass	(Switzerland) Roger Federer	6–7^{(7–9)}, 6–4, 6–7^{(3–7)}, 6–2, 2–6
Win	23–5	Jul 2007	Stuttgart Open, Germany (2)	Intl. Gold	Clay	(Switzerland) Stanislas Wawrinka	6–4, 7–5
Loss	23–6	Nov 2007	Paris Masters, France	Masters	Hard (i)	(Argentina) David Nalbandian	4–6, 0–6
Loss	23–7	Jan 2008	Maharashtra Open, India	International	Hard	(Russia) Mikhail Youzhny	0–6, 1–6
Loss	23–8	Apr 2008	Miami Open, United States	Masters	Hard	(Russia) Nikolay Davydenko	4–6, 2–6
Win	24–8	Apr 2008	Monte-Carlo Masters, France (4)	Masters	Clay	(Switzerland) Roger Federer	7–5, 7–5
Win	25–8	May 2008	Barcelona Open, Spain (4)	Intl. Gold	Clay	(Spain) David Ferrer	6–1, 4–6, 6–1
Win	26–8	May 2008	German Open, Germany	Masters	Clay	(Switzerland) Roger Federer	7–5, 6–7^{(3–7)}, 6–3
Win	27–8	Jun 2008	French Open, France (4)	Grand Slam	Clay	(Switzerland) Roger Federer	6–1, 6–3, 6–0
Win	28–8	Jun 2008	Queen's Club Championships, UK	International	Grass	(Serbia) Novak Djokovic	7–6^{(8–6)}, 7–5
Win	29–8	Jul 2008	Wimbledon, United Kingdom	Grand Slam	Grass	(Switzerland) Roger Federer	6–4, 6–4, 6–7^{(5–7)}, 6–7^{(8–10)}, 9–7
Win	30–8	Jul 2008	Canadian Open, Canada (2)	Masters	Hard	(Germany) Nicolas Kiefer	6–3, 6–2
Win	31–8	Aug 2008	Summer Olympics, China	Olympics	Hard	(Chile) Fernando González	6–3, 7–6^{(7–2)}, 6–3
Win	32–8	Feb 2009	Australian Open, Australia	Grand Slam	Hard	(Switzerland) Roger Federer	7–5, 3–6, 7–6^{(7–3)}, 3–6, 6–2
Loss	32–9	Feb 2009	Rotterdam Open, Netherlands	ATP 500	Hard (i)	(United Kingdom) Andy Murray	3–6, 6–4, 0–6
Win	33–9	Mar 2009	Indian Wells Open, United States (2)	ATP 1000	Hard	(United Kingdom) Andy Murray	6–1, 6–2
Win	34–9	Apr 2009	Monte-Carlo Masters, France (5)	ATP 1000	Clay	(Serbia) Novak Djokovic	6–3, 2–6, 6–1
Win	35–9	Apr 2009	Barcelona Open, Spain (5)	ATP 500	Clay	(Spain) David Ferrer	6–2, 7–5
Win	36–9	May 2009	Italian Open, Italy (4)	ATP 1000	Clay	(Serbia) Novak Djokovic	7–6^{(7–2)}, 6–2
Loss	36–10	May 2009	Madrid Open, Spain	ATP 1000	Clay	(Switzerland) Roger Federer	4–6, 4–6
Loss	36–11	Oct 2009	Shanghai Masters, China	ATP 1000	Hard	(Russia) Nikolay Davydenko	6–7^{(3–7)}, 3–6
Loss	36–12	Jan 2010	Qatar Open, Qatar	ATP 250	Hard	(Russia) Nikolay Davydenko	6–0, 6–7^{(8–10)}, 4–6
Win	37–12	Apr 2010	Monte-Carlo Masters, France (6)	ATP 1000	Clay	(Spain) Fernando Verdasco	6–0, 6–1
Win	38–12	May 2010	Italian Open, Italy (5)	ATP 1000	Clay	(Spain) David Ferrer	7–5, 6–2
Win	39–12	May 2010	Madrid Open, Spain (2)	ATP 1000	Clay	(Switzerland) Roger Federer	6–4, 7–6^{(7–5)}
Win	40–12	Jun 2010	French Open, France (5)	Grand Slam	Clay	(Sweden) Robin Söderling	6–4, 6–2, 6–4
Win	41–12	Jul 2010	Wimbledon, United Kingdom (2)	Grand Slam	Grass	(Czech Republic) Tomáš Berdych	6–3, 7–5, 6–4
Win	42–12	Sep 2010	US Open, United States	Grand Slam	Hard	(Serbia) Novak Djokovic	6–4, 5–7, 6–4, 6–2
Win	43–12	Oct 2010	Japan Open, Japan	ATP 500	Hard	(France) Gaël Monfils	6–1, 7–5
Loss	43–13	Nov 2010	ATP World Tour Finals, United Kingdom	ATP Finals	Hard (i)	(Switzerland) Roger Federer	3–6, 6–3, 1–6
Loss	43–14	Mar 2011	Indian Wells Open, United States	ATP 1000	Hard	(Serbia) Novak Djokovic	6–4, 3–6, 2–6
Loss	43–15	Apr 2011	Miami Open, United States	ATP 1000	Hard	(Serbia) Novak Djokovic	6–4, 3–6, 6–7^{(4–7)}
Win	44–15	Apr 2011	Monte-Carlo Masters, France (7)	ATP 1000	Clay	(Spain) David Ferrer	6–4, 7–5
Win	45–15	Apr 2011	Barcelona Open, Spain (6)	ATP 500	Clay	(Spain) David Ferrer	6–2, 6–4
Loss	45–16	May 2011	Madrid Open, Spain	ATP 1000	Clay	(Serbia) Novak Djokovic	5–7, 4–6
Loss	45–17	May 2011	Italian Open, Italy	ATP 1000	Clay	(Serbia) Novak Djokovic	4–6, 4–6
Win	46–17	Jun 2011	French Open, France (6)	Grand Slam	Clay	(Switzerland) Roger Federer	7–5, 7–6^{(7–3)}, 5–7, 6–1
Loss	46–18	Jul 2011	Wimbledon, United Kingdom	Grand Slam	Grass	(Serbia) Novak Djokovic	4–6, 1–6, 6–1, 3–6
Loss	46–19	Sep 2011	US Open, United States	Grand Slam	Hard	(Serbia) Novak Djokovic	2–6, 4–6, 7–6^{(7–3)}, 1–6
Loss	46–20	Oct 2011	Japan Open, Japan	ATP 500	Hard	(United Kingdom) Andy Murray	6–3, 2–6, 0–6
Loss	46–21	Jan 2012	Australian Open, Australia	Grand Slam	Hard	(Serbia) Novak Djokovic	7–5, 4–6, 2–6, 7–6^{(7–5)}, 5–7
Win	47–21	Apr 2012	Monte-Carlo Masters, France (8)	ATP 1000	Clay	(Serbia) Novak Djokovic	6–3, 6–1
Win	48–21	Apr 2012	Barcelona Open, Spain (7)	ATP 500	Clay	(Spain) David Ferrer	7–6^{(7–1)}, 7–5
Win	49–21	May 2012	Italian Open, Italy (6)	ATP 1000	Clay	(Serbia) Novak Djokovic	7–5, 6–3
Win	50–21	Jun 2012	French Open, France (7)	Grand Slam	Clay	(Serbia) Novak Djokovic	6–4, 6–3, 2–6, 7–5
Loss	50–22	Feb 2013	Chile Open, Chile	ATP 250	Clay	(Argentina) Horacio Zeballos	7–6^{(7–2)}, 6–7^{(6–8)}, 4–6
Win	51–22	Feb 2013	Brasil Open, Brazil (2)	ATP 250	Clay (i)	(Argentina) David Nalbandian	6–2, 6–3
Win	52–22	Mar 2013	Mexican Open, Mexico (2)	ATP 500	Clay	(Spain) David Ferrer	6–0, 6–2
Win	53–22	Mar 2013	Indian Wells Open, United States (3)	ATP 1000	Hard	(Argentina) Juan Martín del Potro	4–6, 6–3, 6–4
Loss	53–23	Apr 2013	Monte-Carlo Masters, France	ATP 1000	Clay	(Serbia) Novak Djokovic	2–6, 6–7^{(1–7)}
Win	54–23	Apr 2013	Barcelona Open, Spain (8)	ATP 500	Clay	(Spain) Nicolás Almagro	6–4, 6–3
Win	55–23	May 2013	Madrid Open, Spain (3)	ATP 1000	Clay	(Switzerland) Stanislas Wawrinka	6–2, 6–4
Win	56–23	May 2013	Italian Open, Italy (7)	ATP 1000	Clay	(Switzerland) Roger Federer	6–1, 6–3
Win	57–23	Jun 2013	French Open, France (8)	Grand Slam	Clay	(Spain) David Ferrer	6–3, 6–2, 6–3
Win	58–23	Aug 2013	Canadian Open, Canada (3)	ATP 1000	Hard	(Canada) Milos Raonic	6–2, 6–2
Win	59–23	Aug 2013	Cincinnati Open, United States	ATP 1000	Hard	(United States) John Isner	7–6^{(10–8)}, 7–6^{(7–3)}
Win	60–23	Sep 2013	US Open, United States (2)	Grand Slam	Hard	(Serbia) Novak Djokovic	6–2, 3–6, 6–4, 6–1
Loss	60–24	Oct 2013	China Open, China	ATP 500	Hard	(Serbia) Novak Djokovic	3–6, 4–6
Loss	60–25	Nov 2013	ATP World Tour Finals, United Kingdom	ATP Finals	Hard (i)	(Serbia) Novak Djokovic	3–6, 4–6
Win	61–25	Jan 2014	Qatar Open, Qatar	ATP 250	Hard	(France) Gaël Monfils	6–1, 6–7^{(5–7)}, 6–2
Loss	61–26	Jan 2014	Australian Open, Australia	Grand Slam	Hard	(Switzerland) Stanislas Wawrinka	3–6, 2–6, 6–3, 3–6
Win	62–26	Feb 2014	Rio Open, Brazil	ATP 500	Clay	(Ukraine) Alexandr Dolgopolov	6–3, 7–6^{(7–3)}
Loss	62–27	Apr 2014	Miami Open, United States	ATP 1000	Hard	(Serbia) Novak Djokovic	3–6, 3–6
Win	63–27	May 2014	Madrid Open, Spain (4)	ATP 1000	Clay	(Japan) Kei Nishikori	2–6, 6–4, 3–0 ret.
Loss	63–28	May 2014	Italian Open, Italy	ATP 1000	Clay	(Serbia) Novak Djokovic	6–4, 3–6, 3–6
Win	64–28	Jun 2014	French Open, France (9)	Grand Slam	Clay	(Serbia) Novak Djokovic	3–6, 7–5, 6–2, 6–4
Win	65–28	Mar 2015	Argentina Open, Argentina	ATP 250	Clay	(Argentina) Juan Mónaco	6–4, 6–1
Loss	65–29	May 2015	Madrid Open, Spain	ATP 1000	Clay	(United Kingdom) Andy Murray	3–6, 2–6
Win	66–29	Jun 2015	Stuttgart Open, Germany (3)	ATP 250	Grass	(Serbia) Viktor Troicki	7–6^{(7–3)}, 6–3
Win	67–29	Aug 2015	German Open, Germany (2)	ATP 500	Clay	(Italy) Fabio Fognini	7–5, 7–5
Loss	67–30	Oct 2015	China Open, China	ATP 500	Hard	(Serbia) Novak Djokovic	2–6, 2–6
Loss	67–31	Nov 2015	Swiss Indoors, Switzerland	ATP 500	Hard (i)	(Switzerland) Roger Federer	3–6, 7–5, 3–6
Loss	67–32	Jan 2016	Qatar Open, Qatar	ATP 250	Hard	(Serbia) Novak Djokovic	1–6, 2–6
Win	68–32	Apr 2016	Monte-Carlo Masters, France (9)	ATP 1000	Clay	(France) Gaël Monfils	7–5, 5–7, 6–0
Win	69–32	Apr 2016	Barcelona Open, Spain (9)	ATP 500	Clay	(Japan) Kei Nishikori	6–4, 7–5
Loss	69–33	Jan 2017	Australian Open, Australia	Grand Slam	Hard	(Switzerland) Roger Federer	4–6, 6–3, 1–6, 6–3, 3–6
Loss	69–34	Mar 2017	Mexican Open, Mexico	ATP 500	Hard	(United States) Sam Querrey	3–6, 6–7^{(3–7)}
Loss	69–35	Apr 2017	Miami Open, United States	ATP 1000	Hard	(Switzerland) Roger Federer	3–6, 4–6
Win	70–35	Apr 2017	Monte-Carlo Masters, France (10)	ATP 1000	Clay	(Spain) Albert Ramos Viñolas	6–1, 6–3
Win	71–35	Apr 2017	Barcelona Open, Spain (10)	ATP 500	Clay	(Austria) Dominic Thiem	6–4, 6–1
Win	72–35	May 2017	Madrid Open, Spain (5)	ATP 1000	Clay	(Austria) Dominic Thiem	7–6^{(10–8)}, 6–4
Win	73–35	Jun 2017	French Open, France (10)	Grand Slam	Clay	(Switzerland) Stan Wawrinka	6–2, 6–3, 6–1
Win	74–35	Sep 2017	US Open, United States (3)	Grand Slam	Hard	(South Africa) Kevin Anderson	6–3, 6–3, 6–4
Win	75–35	Oct 2017	China Open, China (2)	ATP 500	Hard	(Australia) Nick Kyrgios	6–2, 6–1
Loss	75–36	Oct 2017	Shanghai Masters, China	ATP 1000	Hard	(Switzerland) Roger Federer	4–6, 3–6
Win	76–36	Apr 2018	Monte-Carlo Masters, France (11)	ATP 1000	Clay	(Japan) Kei Nishikori	6–3, 6–2
Win	77–36	Apr 2018	Barcelona Open, Spain (11)	ATP 500	Clay	(Greece) Stefanos Tsitsipas	6–2, 6–1
Win	78–36	May 2018	Italian Open, Italy (8)	ATP 1000	Clay	(Germany) Alexander Zverev	6–1, 1–6, 6–3
Win	79–36	Jun 2018	French Open, France (11)	Grand Slam	Clay	(Austria) Dominic Thiem	6–4, 6–3, 6–2
Win	80–36	Aug 2018	Canadian Open, Canada (4)	ATP 1000	Hard	(Greece) Stefanos Tsitsipas	6–2, 7–6^{(7–4)}
Loss	80–37	Jan 2019	Australian Open, Australia	Grand Slam	Hard	(Serbia) Novak Djokovic	3–6, 2–6, 3–6
Win	81–37	May 2019	Italian Open, Italy (9)	ATP 1000	Clay	(Serbia) Novak Djokovic	6–0, 4–6, 6–1
Win	82–37	Jun 2019	French Open, France (12)	Grand Slam	Clay	(Austria) Dominic Thiem	6–3, 5–7, 6–1, 6–1
Win	83–37	Aug 2019	Canadian Open, Canada (5)	ATP 1000	Hard	(Russia) Daniil Medvedev	6–3, 6–0
Win	84–37	Sep 2019	US Open, United States (4)	Grand Slam	Hard	(Russia) Daniil Medvedev	7–5, 6–3, 5–7, 4–6, 6–4
Win	85–37	Feb 2020	Mexican Open, Mexico (3)	ATP 500	Hard	(United States) Taylor Fritz	6–3, 6–2
Win	86–37	Oct 2020	French Open, France (13)	Grand Slam	Clay	(Serbia) Novak Djokovic	6–0, 6–2, 7–5
Win	87–37	Apr 2021	Barcelona Open, Spain (12)	ATP 500	Clay	(Greece) Stefanos Tsitsipas	6–4, 6–7^{(6–8)}, 7–5
Win	88–37	May 2021	Italian Open, Italy (10)	ATP 1000	Clay	(Serbia) Novak Djokovic	7–5, 1–6, 6–3
Win	89–37	Jan 2022	Melbourne Summer Set, Australia	ATP 250	Hard	(United States) Maxime Cressy	7–6^{(8–6)}, 6–3
Win	90–37	Jan 2022	Australian Open, Australia (2)	Grand Slam	Hard	(Russia) Daniil Medvedev	2–6, 6–7^{(5–7)}, 6–4, 6–4, 7–5
Win	91–37	Feb 2022	Mexican Open, Mexico (4)	ATP 500	Hard	(United Kingdom) Cameron Norrie	6–4, 6–4
Loss	91–38	Mar 2022	Indian Wells Open, United States	ATP 1000	Hard	(United States) Taylor Fritz	3–6, 6–7^{(5–7)}
Win	92–38	Jun 2022	French Open, France (14)	Grand Slam	Clay	(Norway) Casper Ruud	6–3, 6–3, 6–0
Loss	92–39	Jul 2024	Swedish Open, Sweden	ATP 250	Clay	(Portugal) Nuno Borges	3–6, 2–6

=== Doubles: 15 (11 titles, 4 runner-ups) ===
Legend Grand Slam (0–0) Olympic Games (1–0) ATP Finals (0–0) ATP 1000 (3–0) ATP 500 (1–2) ATP 250 (6–2)	Finals by surface Hard (9–1) Clay (2–3) Grass (0–0)	Finals by setting Outdoor (11–4) Indoor (0–0)

() signifies tournaments where Nadal and his partner won the title without dropping a set.
() signifies tournaments where Nadal and his partner won the title after saving at least one match point.

Result	W–L	Date	Tournament	Tier	Surface	Partner	Opponents	Score
Win	1–0	Jul 2003	Croatia Open, Croatia	International	Clay	(Spain) Álex López Morón	(Australia) Todd Perry (Japan) Thomas Shimada	6–1, 6–3
Win	2–0	Jan 2004	Maharashtra Open, India	International	Hard	(Spain) Tommy Robredo	(Israel) Jonathan Erlich (Israel) Andy Ram	7–6^{(7–3)}, 4–6, 6–3
Win	3–0	Jan 2005	Qatar Open, Qatar	International	Hard	(Spain) Albert Costa	(Romania) Andrei Pavel (Russia) Mikhail Youzhny	6–3, 4–6, 6–3
Loss	3–1	Apr 2005	Barcelona Open, Spain	Intl. Gold	Clay	(Spain) Feliciano López	(India) Leander Paes (Serbia and Montenegro) Nenad Zimonjić	3–6, 3–6
Loss	3–2	Jan 2007	Maharashtra Open, India	International	Hard	(Spain) Tomeu Salvà	(Belgium) Xavier Malisse (Belgium) Dick Norman	6–7^{(4–7)}, 6–7^{(4–7)}
Loss	3–3	Apr 2007	Barcelona Open, Spain	Intl. Gold	Clay	(Spain) Tomeu Salvà	(Romania) Andrei Pavel (Germany) Alexander Waske	3–6, 6–7^{(1–7)}
Win	4–3	Apr 2008	Monte-Carlo Masters, France	Masters	Clay	(Spain) Tommy Robredo	(India) Mahesh Bhupathi (The Bahamas) Mark Knowles	6–3, 6–3
Win	5–3	Jan 2009	Qatar Open, Qatar (2)	ATP 250	Hard	(Spain) Marc López	(Canada) Daniel Nestor (Serbia) Nenad Zimonjić	4–6, 6–4, [10–8]
Win	6–3	Mar 2010	Indian Wells Open, United States	ATP 1000	Hard	(Spain) Marc López	(Canada) Daniel Nestor (Serbia) Nenad Zimonjić	7–6^{(10–8)}, 6–3
Win	7–3	Jan 2011	Qatar Open, Qatar (3)	ATP 250	Hard	(Spain) Marc López	(Italy) Daniele Bracciali (Italy) Andreas Seppi	6–3, 7–6^{(7–4)}
Win	8–3	Mar 2012	Indian Wells Open, United States (2)	ATP 1000	Hard	(Spain) Marc López	(United States) John Isner (United States) Sam Querrey	6–2, 7–6^{(7–3)}
Loss	8–4	Feb 2013	Chile Open, Chile	ATP 250	Clay	(Argentina) Juan Mónaco	(Italy) Paolo Lorenzi (Italy) Potito Starace	2–6, 4–6
Win	9–4	Jan 2015	Qatar Open, Qatar (4)	ATP 250	Hard	(Argentina) Juan Mónaco	(Austria) Julian Knowle (Austria) Philipp Oswald	6–3, 6–4
Win	10–4	Aug 2016	Summer Olympics, Brazil	Olympics	Hard	(Spain) Marc López	(Romania) Florin Mergea (Romania) Horia Tecău	6–2, 3–6, 6–4
Win	11–4	Oct 2016	China Open, China	ATP 500	Hard	(Spain) Pablo Carreño Busta	(United States) Jack Sock (Australia) Bernard Tomic	6–7^{(6–8)}, 6–2, [10–8]

== Other professional tournaments ==
=== ATP Challengers & ITF Futures finals: 12 (8 titles, 4 runner-ups) ===
Legend
ATP Challenger Tour (2–4)
ITF Futures (6–0)

Result	W–L	Date	Tournament	Tier	Surface	Opponent	Score
Loss	0–1	Feb 2003	Hamburg Challenger, Germany	Challenger	Carpet (i)	(Croatia) Mario Ančić	2–6, 3–6
Loss	0–2	Mar 2003	Cherbourg Challenger, France	Challenger	Hard (i)	(Argentina) Sergio Roitman	3–6, 7–5, 4–6
Loss	0–3	Mar 2003	Sardinia International Championships, Italy	Challenger	Clay	(Italy) Filippo Volandri	6–2, 2–6, 1–6
Win	1–3	Mar 2003	Barletta Open, Italy	Challenger	Clay	(Spain) Albert Portas	6–2, 7–6^{(7–2)}
Loss	1–4	May 2003	Aix-en-Provence Challenger, France	Challenger	Clay	(Argentina) Mariano Puerta	6–3, 6–7^{(6–8)}, 4–6
Win	2–4	Aug 2003	Segovia Open, Spain	Challenger	Hard	(Czech Republic) Tomáš Zíb	6–2, 7–6^{(7–1)}
Win	1–0	Jul 2002	Alicante F5, Spain	Futures	Clay	(Spain) Marc Fornell	7–5, 3–6, 6–3
Win	2–0	Aug 2002	Vigo F10, Spain	Futures	Clay	(Argentina) Antonio Pastorino	4–6, 7–6^{(7–4)}, 6–4
Win	3–0	Sep 2002	Barcelona F15, Spain	Futures	Clay	(Spain) Marc Fornell	6–4, 6–3
Win	4–0	Sep 2002	Madrid F16, Spain	Futures	Clay	(Spain) Guillermo García López	6–3, 7–6^{(7–1)}
Win	5–0	Nov 2002	Las Palmas F19, Spain	Futures	Clay	(Spain) Marc Fornell	6–2, 6–3
Win	6–0	Dec 2002	Maspalomas F20, Spain	Futures	Carpet (i)	(Germany) Florian Mayer	7–6^{(7–3)}, 6–4

=== Singles: 5 (4 titles, 1 runner-up) ===
Result	Date	Tournament	Surface	Opponent	Score
Loss	Jul 2003	Spanish National Tennis Championship, Majadahonda, Spain	Clay	(Spain) Feliciano López	4–6, 4–6
Win	Sep 2003	Trofeo Internacional Ciudad de Albacete, Spain	Clay	(Spain) Feliciano López	6–4, 7–6^{(7–5)}
Win	Jun 2005	Copa del Rey, Huelva, Spain	Clay	(Spain) Carlos Moyá	7–5, 6–1
Win	Dec 2006	Master Internacional de Málaga, Spain	Hard (i)	(Spain) David Ferrer	6–4, 3–6, 6–4
Win	Dec 2007	Master Internacional de Málaga, Spain (2)	Hard (i)	(Spain) Carlos Moyá	6–3, 6–4

=== Doubles: (1 title) ===
Result	Date	Tournament	Surface	Partner	Opponent	Score
Win	Dec 2016	Spanish National Tennis Championship, Manacor, Spain	Hard	(Spain) Marc López	(Spain) Jordi Muñoz Abreu (Spain) David Pérez Sanz	7–6^{(11–9)}, 7–6^{(7–1)}

== ATP ranking ==
Year	2001	2002	2003	2004	2005	2006	2007	2008	2009	2010	2011	2012	2013	2014	2015	2016	2017	2018	2019	2020	2021	2022	2023	2024
High	811	200	45	34	2	2	2	1	1	1	1	2	1	1	3	4	1	1	1	1	2	2	2	151
Low	1021	810	198	71	56	2	2	2	3	4	2	4	5	3	10	9	9	2	2	2	6	6	670	672
End	811	200	49	51	2	2	2	1	2	1	2	4	1	3	5	9	1	2	1	2	6	2	670	153

Rafael Nadal made his ATP Rankings Top-10 debut on April 25, 2005 when he moved up from No.11 to No.7. Nadal would spend a record 912 consecutive weeks inside the ATP Rankings' Top-10, before finally dropping to No.13 in March 20, 2023 (nearly 18 years since his top-10 debut. The previous record was 788 consecutive weeks in the Top-10, from August 23, 1973, the week the ATP first started their ranking system and Connors was No.10 at the time, and never dropped out until October 3, 1988. Connors record stood for 32 years, until Rafa broke it on October 25, 2020.

Nadal spent 596 weeks in the Top-2 since the rankings began in 1973. He surpassed Federer's previous record of 528 weeks on 9 November 2019. He was eventually surpassed by Novak Djokovic, who has spent 599 total weeks at the ATP Tour’s No.1 and No.2 rankings.

Ranking	Weeks at	Ranking range	Total weeks	In Open Era
No.1	209	Top-1	209	No.6
No.2	387†	Top-2	596	2nd
No.3	90	Top-3	686	3rd
No.4	70	Top-4	756	3rd
No.5	81	Top-5	837	3rd
No.6	30	Top-6	867	3rd
No.7	15	Top-7	882	3rd
No.8	8	Top-8	890	3rd
No.9	14	Top-9	904	3rd
No.10	8	Top-10	912‡	3rd
No.11-19	15	Top-20	927	3rd
No.21-50	70	Top-50	996	3rd
No.51-100	33	Top-100	1029	3rd

† – Includes a record 160 consecutive weeks at No.2 during Federer’s record 237 consecutive weeks at No.1. ‡ – ATP Tour record for most consecutive weeks ranked in the top-10.

=== ATP world No. 1 ===
- Note: The ATP Tour was suspended from 23 March 2020 to 23 August 2020, a span of 23-consecutive weeks.

==== No. 1 by stints ====
Stint #	Start date	End date	Weeks	Total
1	18 August 2008	5 July 2009	46	46
2	7 June 2010	3 July 2011	56	102
3	7 October 2013	6 July 2014	39	141
4	21 August 2017	18 February 2018	26	167
5	2 April 2018	13 May 2018	6	173
6	21 May 2018	17 June 2018	4	177
7	25 June 2018	4 November 2018	19	196
8	4 November 2019	2 February 2020	13	209

==== No. 1 ranking debut and end ====
Birthdate	No.1 debut date	Age at No.1 debut	No.1 end date	Age at No.1 end
3 June 1986	18 August 2008	22 years, 76 days	2 February 2020	33 years, 244 days

===== No. 1 statistics =====
Category	Weeks/ Times (years)
Career weeks at No. 1	209
Most consecutive weeks at No. 1	56
Year-end No. 1	5 (2008, 2010, 2013, 2017, 2019)
Year-end No. 1 consecutive streak	1 (2008, 2010, 2013, 2017, 2019)

===== Weeks at No. 1 by decade =====
====== 2000s ======
46

====== 2010s ======
159

====== 2020s ======
4

Note: Nadal is the only male player in history to be ranked world No.1 in three different decades.

=== Rankings milestones ===
Feat	From	To	Date Achieved	Age	# Weeks*
No. 1-debut	No.2	No.1	18 August 2008	22 years, 76 days	160
Top-2 debut	No.3	No.2	25 July 2005	19 years, 52 days	7
Top-3 debut	No.5	No.3	6 June 2005	19 years, 3 days	4
Top-5 debut	No.7	No.5	9 May 2005	18 years, 340 days	2
Top-10 debut	No.11	No.7	25 April 2005	18 years, 326 days	3
Top-25 debut	No.31	No.17	4 April 2005	18 years, 305 days	87
Top-50 debut	No.51	No.48	4 August 2003	17 years, 62 days	15
Top-100 debut	No.109	No.96	21 April 2003	16 years, 322 days	19
Top-200 debut	No.213	No.200	9 December 2002	16 years, 189 days	20
Top-500 debut	No.593	No.489	22 July 2002	16 years, 49 days	43
ATP Rankings debut		No.1002	24 September 2001	15 years, 113 days	

* Number of weeks spent prior to reaching milestone.

== Top-10 wins ==
Nadal has the third most wins over Top-10 ranked players in the Open Era. He has a 186–105 (63.92%) record against players who were, at the time the match was played, ranked in the Top-10.

Nadal has a record 23 wins over №1-ranked players, beating Federer 13 times and Djokovic 10 times. Nadal has a 23–19 (54.76%) record against players who were, at the time the match was played, the top-ranked player.

Season	2001	2002	2003	2004	2005	2006	2007	2008	2009	2010	2011	2012	2013	2014	2015	2016	2017	2018	2019	2020	2021	2022	2023	2024	Total
Wins	0	0	2	2	5	10	11	17	14	11	16	11	24	6	7	4	12	10	9	3	4	8	0	0	186

#	Player	Rk	Event	Surface	Rd	Score	Rk
2003
1.	(Spain) Albert Costa	7	Monte-Carlo Masters, France	Clay	2R	7–5, 6–3	109
2.	(Spain) Carlos Moyá	4	German Open, Germany	Clay	2R	7–5, 6–4	87
2004
3.	(Switzerland) Roger Federer	1	Miami Open, United States	Hard	3R	6–3, 6–3	34
4.	(United States) Andy Roddick	2	Davis Cup, Spain	Clay (i)	RR	6–7^{(6–8)}, 6–2, 7–6^{(8–6)}, 6–2	51
2005
5.	(Argentina) Gastón Gaudio	6	Monte-Carlo Masters, France	Clay	QF	6–3, 6–0	17
6.	(Argentina) Guillermo Coria	9	Monte-Carlo Masters, France	Clay	F	6–3, 6–1, 0–6, 7–5	17
7.	(Switzerland) Roger Federer	1	French Open, France	Clay	SF	6–3, 4–6, 6–4, 6–3	5
8.	(United States) Andre Agassi	7	Canadian Open, Canada	Hard	F	6–3, 4–6, 6–2	2
9.	(Argentina) Guillermo Coria	8	China Open, China	Hard	F	5–7, 6–1, 6–2	2
2006
10.	(Switzerland) Roger Federer	1	Dubai Open, United Arab Emirates	Hard	F	2–6, 6–4, 6–4	2
11.	(Argentina) Guillermo Coria	9	Monte-Carlo Masters, France	Clay	QF	6–2, 6–1	2
12.	(Argentina) Gastón Gaudio	8	Monte-Carlo Masters, France	Clay	SF	5–7, 6–1, 6–1	2
13.	(Switzerland) Roger Federer	1	Monte-Carlo Masters, France	Clay	F	6–2, 6–7^{(2–7)}, 6–3, 7–6^{(7–5)}	2
14.	(Chile) Fernando González	9	Italian Open, Italy	Clay	QF	6–4, 6–3	2
15.	(Switzerland) Roger Federer	1	Italian Open, Italy	Clay	F	6–7^{(0–7)}, 7–6^{(7–5)}, 6–4, 2–6, 7–6^{(7–5)}	2
16.	(Croatia) Ivan Ljubičić	4	French Open, France	Clay	SF	6–4, 6–2, 7–6^{(9–7)}	2
17.	(Switzerland) Roger Federer	1	French Open, France	Clay	F	1–6, 6–1, 6–4, 7–6^{(7–4)}	2
18.	(Spain) Tommy Robredo	6	Tennis Masters Cup, China	Hard (i)	RR	7–6^{(7–2)}, 6–2	2
19.	(Russia) Nikolay Davydenko	3	Tennis Masters Cup, China	Hard (i)	RR	5–7, 6–4, 6–4	2
2007
20.	(United States) Andy Roddick	3	Indian Wells Open, United States	Hard	SF	6–4, 6–3	2
21.	(Switzerland) Roger Federer	1	Monte-Carlo Masters, France	Clay	F	6–4, 6–4	2
22.	(Serbia) Novak Djokovic	5	Italian Open, Italy	Clay	QF	6–2, 6–3	2
23.	(Russia) Nikolay Davydenko	4	Italian Open, Italy	Clay	SF	7–6^{(7–3)}, 6–7^{(8–10)}, 6–4	2
24.	(Chile) Fernando González	6	Italian Open, Italy	Clay	F	6–2, 6–2	2
25.	(Chile) Fernando González	5	German Open, Germany	Clay	QF	6–4, 6–4	2
26.	(Serbia) Novak Djokovic	6	French Open, France	Clay	SF	7–5, 6–4, 6–2	2
27.	(Switzerland) Roger Federer	1	French Open, France	Clay	F	6–3, 4–6, 6–3, 6–4	2
28.	(Serbia) Novak Djokovic	5	Wimbledon, UK	Grass	SF	3–6, 6–1, 4–1, ret.	2
29.	(France) Richard Gasquet	8	Tennis Masters Cup, China	Hard (i)	RR	3–6, 6–3, 6–4	2
30.	(Serbia) Novak Djokovic	3	Tennis Masters Cup, China	Hard (i)	RR	6–4, 6–4	2
2008
31.	(United States) James Blake	9	Indian Wells Open, United States	Hard	QF	7–5, 3–6, 6–3	2
32.	(United States) James Blake	9	Miami Open, United States	Hard	QF	3–6, 6–3, 6–1	2
33.	(Czech Republic) Tomáš Berdych	10	Miami Open, United States	Hard	SF	7–6^{(7–2)}, 6–2	2
34.	(Spain) David Ferrer	5	Monte-Carlo Masters, France	Clay	QF	6–1, 7–5	2
35.	(Russia) Nikolay Davydenko	4	Monte-Carlo Masters, France	Clay	SF	6–3, 6–2	2
36.	(Switzerland) Roger Federer	1	Monte-Carlo Masters, France	Clay	F	7–5, 7–5	2
37.	(Spain) David Ferrer	5	Barcelona Open, Spain	Clay	F	6–1, 4–6, 6–1	2
38.	(Serbia) Novak Djokovic	3	German Open, Germany	Clay	SF	7–5, 2–6, 6–2	2
39.	(Switzerland) Roger Federer	1	German Open, Germany	Clay	F	7–5, 6–7^{(3–7)}, 6–3	2
40.	(Serbia) Novak Djokovic	3	French Open, France	Clay	SF	6–4, 6–2, 7–6^{7–3)}	2
41.	(Switzerland) Roger Federer	1	French Open, France	Clay	F	6–1, 6–3, 6–0	2
42.	(United States) Andy Roddick	6	Queen's Club Championships, UK	Grass	SF	7–5, 6–4	2
43.	(Serbia) Novak Djokovic	3	Queen's Club Championships, UK	Grass	F	7–6^{(8–6)}, 7–5	2
44.	(Switzerland) Roger Federer	1	Wimbledon, UK	Grass	F	6–4, 6–4, 6–7^{(5–7)}, 6–7^{(8–10)}, 9–7	2
45.	(United Kingdom) Andy Murray	9	Canadian Open, Canada	Hard	SF	7–6^{(7–2)}, 6–3	2
46.	(Serbia) Novak Djokovic	3	Beijing Summer Olympics, China	Hard	SF	6–4, 1–6, 6–4	2
47.	(United States) Andy Roddick	8	Davis Cup, Spain	Clay	RR	6–4, 6–0, 6–4	1
2009
48.	(France) Gilles Simon	8	Australian Open, Australia	Hard	QF	6–2, 7–5, 7–5	1
49.	(Switzerland) Roger Federer	2	Australian Open, Australia	Hard	F	7–5, 3–6, 7–6^{(7–3)}, 3–6, 6–2	1
50.	(Serbia) Novak Djokovic	3	Davis Cup, Benidorm, Spain	Clay	RR	6–4, 6–4, 6–1	1
51.	(Argentina) Juan Martín del Potro	6	Indian Wells Open, United States	Hard	QF	6–2, 6–4	1
52.	(United States) Andy Roddick	7	Indian Wells Open, United States	Hard	SF	6–4, 7–6^{(7–4)}	1
53.	(United Kingdom) Andy Murray	4	Indian Wells Open, United States	Hard	F	6–1, 6–2	1
54.	(United Kingdom) Andy Murray	4	Monte-Carlo Masters, France	Clay	SF	6–2, 7–6^{(7–4)}	1
55.	(Serbia) Novak Djokovic	3	Monte-Carlo Masters, France	Clay	F	6–3, 2–6, 6–1	1
56.	(Russia) Nikolay Davydenko	8	Barcelona Open, Spain	Clay	SF	6–3, 6–2	1
57.	(Spain) Fernando Verdasco	8	Italian Open, Italy	Clay	QF	6–3, 6–3	1
58.	(Serbia) Novak Djokovic	3	Italian Open, Italy	Clay	F	7–6^{(7–2)}, 6–2	1
59.	(Spain) Fernando Verdasco	8	Madrid Open, Spain	Clay	QF	6–4, 7–5	1
60.	(Serbia) Novak Djokovic	4	Madrid Open, Spain	Clay	SF	3–6, 7–6^{(7–5)}, 7–6^{(11–9)}	1
61.	(France) Jo-Wilfried Tsonga	9	Paris Masters, France	Hard (i)	QF	7–5, 7–5	2
2010
62.	(France) Jo-Wilfried Tsonga	10	Miami Open, United States	Hard	QF	6–3, 6–2	4
63.	(Switzerland) Roger Federer	1	Madrid Open, Spain	Clay	F	6–4, 7–6^{(7–5)}	3
64.	(Sweden) Robin Söderling	7	French Open, France	Clay	F	6–4, 6–2, 6–4	2
65.	(Sweden) Robin Söderling	6	Wimbledon, UK	Grass	QF	3–6, 6–3, 7–6^{(7–4)}, 6–1	1
66.	(United Kingdom) Andy Murray	4	Wimbledon, UK	Grass	SF	6–4, 7–6^{(8–6)}, 6–4	1
67.	(Spain) Fernando Verdasco	8	US Open, United States	Hard	QF	7–5, 6–3, 6–4	1
68.	(Serbia) Novak Djokovic	3	US Open, United States	Hard	F	6–4, 5–7, 6–4, 6–2	1
69.	(United States) Andy Roddick	8	ATP World Tour Finals, UK	Hard (i)	RR	3–6, 7–6^{(7–5)}, 6–4	1
70.	(Serbia) Novak Djokovic	3	ATP World Tour Finals, UK	Hard (i)	RR	7–5, 6–2	1
71.	(Czech Republic) Tomáš Berdych	6	ATP World Tour Finals, UK	Hard (i)	RR	7–6^{(7–3)}, 6–1	1
72.	(United Kingdom) Andy Murray	5	ATP World Tour Finals, UK	Hard (i)	SF	7–6^{(7–5)}, 3–6, 7–6^{(8–6)}	1
2011
73.	(Czech Republic) Tomáš Berdych	7	Miami Open, United States	Hard	QF	6–2, 3–6, 6–3	1
74.	(Switzerland) Roger Federer	3	Miami Open, United States	Hard	SF	6–3, 6–2	1
75.	(United Kingdom) Andy Murray	4	Monte-Carlo Masters, France	Clay	SF	6–4, 2–6, 6–1	1
76.	(Spain) David Ferrer	6	Monte-Carlo Masters, France	Clay	F	6–4, 7–5	1
77.	(France) Gaël Monfils	9	Barcelona Open, Spain	Clay	QF	6–2, 6–2	1
78.	(Spain) David Ferrer	6	Barcelona Open, Spain	Clay	F	6–2, 6–4	1
79.	(Switzerland) Roger Federer	3	Madrid Open, Spain	Clay	SF	5–7, 6–1, 6–3	1
80.	(Sweden) Robin Söderling	5	French Open, France	Clay	QF	6–4, 6–1, 7–6^{(7–3)}	1
81.	(United Kingdom) Andy Murray	4	French Open, France	Clay	SF	6–4, 7–5, 6–4	1
82.	(Switzerland) Roger Federer	3	French Open, France	Clay	F	7–5, 7–6^{(7–3)}, 5–7, 6–1	1
83.	(United States) Mardy Fish	9	Wimbledon, UK	Grass	QF	6–3, 6–3, 5–7, 6–4	1
84.	(United Kingdom) Andy Murray	4	Wimbledon, UK	Grass	SF	5–7, 6–2, 6–2, 6–4	1
85.	(United Kingdom) Andy Murray	4	US Open, United States	Hard	SF	6–4, 6–2, 3–6, 6–2	2
86.	(France) Jo-Wilfried Tsonga	10	Davis Cup, Córdoba, Spain	Clay	RR	6–0, 6–2, 6–4	2
87.	(United States) Mardy Fish	8	Japan Open, Japan	Hard	SF	7–5, 6–1	2
88.	(United States) Mardy Fish	8	ATP World Tour Finals, UK	Hard (i)	RR	6–2, 3–6, 7–6^{(7–3)}	2
2012
89.	(Czech Republic) Tomáš Berdych	7	Australian Open, Australia	Hard	QF	6–7^{(5–7)}, 7–6^{(8–6)}, 6–4, 6–3	2
90.	(Switzerland) Roger Federer	3	Australian Open, Australia	Hard	SF	6–7^{(5–7)}, 6–2, 7–6^{(7–5)}, 6–4	2
91.	(France) Jo-Wilfried Tsonga	6	Miami Open, United States	Hard	QF	6–2, 5–7, 6–4	2
92.	(Serbia) Novak Djokovic	1	Monte-Carlo Masters, France	Clay	F	6–3, 6–1	2
93.	(Serbia) Janko Tipsarević	8	Barcelona Open, Spain	Clay	QF	6–2, 6–2	2
94.	(Spain) David Ferrer	6	Barcelona Open, Spain	Clay	F	7–6^{(7–1)}, 7–5	2
95.	(Czech Republic) Tomáš Berdych	7	Italian Open, Italy	Clay	QF	6–4, 7–5	3
96.	(Spain) David Ferrer	6	Italian Open, Italy	Clay	SF	7–6^{(8–6)}, 6–0	3
97.	(Serbia) Novak Djokovic	1	Italian Open, Italy	Clay	F	7–5, 6–3	3
98.	(Spain) David Ferrer	6	French Open, France	Clay	SF	6–2, 6–2, 6–1	2
99.	(Serbia) Novak Djokovic	1	French Open, France	Clay	F	6–4, 6–3, 2–6, 7–5	2
2013
100.	(Spain) David Ferrer	4	Mexican Open, Mexico	Clay	F	6–0, 6–2	5
101.	(Switzerland) Roger Federer	2	Indian Wells Open, United States	Hard	QF	6–4, 6–2	5
102.	(Czech Republic) Tomáš Berdych	6	Indian Wells Open, United States	Hard	SF	6–4, 7–5	5
103.	(Argentina) Juan Martín del Potro	7	Indian Wells Open, United States	Hard	F	4–6, 6–3, 6–4	5
104.	(France) Jo-Wilfried Tsonga	8	Monte-Carlo Masters, France	Clay	SF	6–3, 7–6^{(7–3)}	5
105.	(Spain) David Ferrer	4	Madrid Open, Spain	Clay	QF	4–6, 7–6^{(7–3)}, 6–0	5
106.	(Spain) David Ferrer	4	Italian Open, Italy	Clay	QF	6–4, 4–6, 6–2	5
107.	(Czech Republic) Tomáš Berdych	6	Italian Open, Italy	Clay	SF	6–2, 6–4	5
108.	(Switzerland) Roger Federer	3	Italian Open, Italy	Clay	F	6–1, 6–3	5
109.	(Switzerland) Stan Wawrinka	10	French Open, France	Clay	QF	6–2, 6–3, 6–1	4
110.	(Serbia) Novak Djokovic	1	French Open, France	Clay	SF	6–4, 3–6, 6–1, 6–7^{(3–7)}, 9–7	4
111.	(Spain) David Ferrer	5	French Open, France	Clay	F	6–3, 6–2, 6–3	4
112.	(Serbia) Novak Djokovic	1	Montreal, Canada	Hard	SF	6–4, 3–6, 7–6^{(7–2)}	4
113.	(Switzerland) Roger Federer	5	Cincinnati, United States	Hard	QF	5–7, 6–4, 6–3	3
114.	(Czech Republic) Tomáš Berdych	6	Cincinnati, United States	Hard	SF	7–5, 7–6^{(7–4)}	3
115.	(France) Richard Gasquet	9	US Open, United States	Hard	SF	6–4, 7–6^{(7–1)}, 6–2	2
116.	(Serbia) Novak Djokovic	1	US Open, United States	Hard	F	6–2, 3–6, 6–4, 6–1	2
117.	(Czech Republic) Tomáš Berdych	5	China Open, China	Hard	SF	4–2, ret.	2
118.	(Switzerland) Stan Wawrinka	8	Shanghai Masters, China	Hard	QF	7–6^{(12–10)}, 6–1	1
119.	(France) Richard Gasquet	10	Paris Masters, France	Hard (i)	QF	6–4, 6–1	1
120.	(Spain) David Ferrer	3	ATP World Tour Finals, UK	Hard (i)	RR	6–3, 6–2	1
121.	(Switzerland) Stan Wawrinka	8	ATP World Tour Finals, UK	Hard (i)	RR	7–6^{(7–5)}, 7–6^{(8–6)}	1
122.	(Czech Republic) Tomáš Berdych	6	ATP World Tour Finals, UK	Hard (i)	RR	6–4, 1–6, 6–3	1
123.	(Switzerland) Roger Federer	7	ATP World Tour Finals, UK	Hard (i)	SF	7–5, 6–3	1
2014
124.	(Switzerland) Roger Federer	6	Australian Open, Australia	Hard	SF	7–6^{(7–4)}, 6–3, 6–3	1
125.	(Czech Republic) Tomáš Berdych	6	Madrid Open, Spain	Clay	QF	6–4, 6–2	1
126.	(United Kingdom) Andy Murray	8	Italian Open, Italy	Clay	QF	1–6, 6–3, 7–5	1
127.	(Spain) David Ferrer	5	French Open, France	Clay	QF	4–6, 6–4, 6–0, 6–1	1
128.	(United Kingdom) Andy Murray	8	French Open, France	Clay	SF	6–3, 6–2, 6–1	1
129.	(Serbia) Novak Djokovic	2	French Open, France	Clay	F	3–6, 7–5, 6–2, 6–4	1
2015
130.	(Spain) David Ferrer	7	Monte-Carlo Masters, France	Clay	QF	6–4, 5–7, 6–2	5
131.	(Czech Republic) Tomáš Berdych	7	Madrid Open, Spain	Clay	SF	7–6^{(7–3)}, 6–1	4
132.	(Canada) Milos Raonic	9	Shanghai Masters, China	Hard	3R	6–3, 7–6^{(7–3)}	7
133.	(Switzerland) Stan Wawrinka	4	Shanghai Masters, China	Hard	QF	6–2, 6–1	7
134.	(Switzerland) Stan Wawrinka	4	ATP World Tour Finals, UK	Hard (i)	RR	6–3, 6–2	5
135.	(United Kingdom) Andy Murray	2	ATP World Tour Finals, UK	Hard (i)	RR	6–4, 6–1	5
136.	(Spain) David Ferrer	7	ATP World Tour Finals, UK	Hard (i)	RR	6–7^{(2–7)}, 6–3, 6–4	5
2016
137.	(Japan) Kei Nishikori	6	Indian Wells Open, United States	Hard	QF	6–4, 6–3	5
138.	(Switzerland) Stan Wawrinka	4	Monte-Carlo Masters, France	Clay	QF	6–1, 6–4	5
139.	(United Kingdom) Andy Murray	2	Monte-Carlo Masters, France	Clay	SF	2–6, 6–4, 6–2	5
140.	(Japan) Kei Nishikori	6	Barcelona Open, Spain	Clay	F	6–4, 7–5	5
2017
141.	(France) Gaël Monfils	6	Australian Open, Australia	Hard	4R	6–3, 6–3, 4–6, 6–4	9
142.	(Canada) Milos Raonic	3	Australian Open, Australia	Hard	QF	6–4, 7–6^{(9–7)}, 6–4	9
143.	(Croatia) Marin Čilić	8	Mexican Open, Mexico	Hard	SF	6–1, 6–2	6
144.	(Austria) Dominic Thiem	9	Barcelona Open, Spain	Clay	F	6–4, 6–1	5
145.	(Belgium) David Goffin	10	Madrid Open, Spain	Clay	QF	7–6^{(7–3)}, 6–2	5
146.	(Serbia) Novak Djokovic	2	Madrid Open, Spain	Clay	SF	6–2, 6–4	5
147.	(Austria) Dominic Thiem	9	Madrid Open, Spain	Clay	F	7–6^{(10–8)}, 6–4	5
148.	(Austria) Dominic Thiem	7	French Open, France	Clay	SF	6–3, 6–4, 6–0	4
149.	(Switzerland) Stan Wawrinka	3	French Open, France	Clay	F	6–2, 6–3, 6–1	4
150.	(Bulgaria) Grigor Dimitrov	8	China Open, China	Hard	SF	6–3, 4–6, 6–1	1
151.	(Bulgaria) Grigor Dimitrov	8	Shanghai Masters, China	Hard	QF	6–4, 6–7^{(4–7)}, 6–3	1
152.	(Croatia) Marin Čilić	5	Shanghai Masters, China	Hard	SF	7–5, 7–6^{(7–3)}	1
2018
153.	(Germany) Alexander Zverev	4	Davis Cup, Valencia, Spain	Clay	RR	6–1, 6–4, 6–4	1
154.	(Austria) Dominic Thiem	7	Monte-Carlo Masters, France	Clay	QF	6–0, 6–2	1
155.	(Bulgaria) Grigor Dimitrov	5	Monte-Carlo Masters, France	Clay	SF	6–4, 6–1	1
156.	(Belgium) David Goffin	10	Barcelona Open, Spain	Clay	SF	6–4, 6–0	1
157.	(Germany) Alexander Zverev	3	Italian Open, Italy	Clay	F	6–1, 1–6, 6–3	2
158.	(Argentina) Juan Martín del Potro	6	French Open, France	Clay	SF	6–4, 6–1, 6–2	1
159.	(Austria) Dominic Thiem	8	French Open, France	Clay	F	6–4, 6–3, 6–2	1
160.	(Argentina) Juan Martín del Potro	4	Wimbledon, UK	Grass	QF	7–5, 6–7^{(7–9)}, 4–6, 6–4, 6–4	1
161.	(Croatia) Marin Čilić	7	Toronto, Canada	Hard	QF	2–6, 6–4, 6–4	1
162.	(Austria) Dominic Thiem	9	US Open, United States	Hard	QF	0–6, 6–4, 7–5, 6–7^{(4–7)}, 7–6^{(7–5)}	1
2019
163.	(Greece) Stefanos Tsitsipas	7	Italian Open, Italy	Clay	SF	6–3, 6–4	2
164.	(Serbia) Novak Djokovic	1	Italian Open, Italy	Clay	F	6–0, 4–6, 6–1	2
165.	(Japan) Kei Nishikori	7	French Open, France	Clay	QF	6–1, 6–1, 6–3	2
166.	(Switzerland) Roger Federer	3	French Open, France	Clay	SF	6–3, 6–4, 6–2	2
167.	(Austria) Dominic Thiem	4	French Open, France	Clay	F	6–3, 5–7, 6–1, 6–1	2
168.	(Russia) Daniil Medvedev	9	Canadian Open, Canada	Hard	F	6–3, 6–0	2
169.	(Russia) Daniil Medvedev	5	US Open, United States	Hard	F	7–5, 6–3, 5–7, 4–6, 6–4	2
170.	(Russia) Daniil Medvedev	4	ATP Finals, UK	Hard (i)	RR	6–7^{(3–7)}, 6–3, 7–6^{(7–4)}	1
171.	(Greece) Stefanos Tsitsipas	6	ATP Finals, UK	Hard (i)	RR	6–7^{(4–7)}, 6–4, 7–5	1
2020
172.	(Serbia) Novak Djokovic	1	French Open, France	Clay	F	6–0, 6–2, 7–5	2
173.	(Russia) Andrey Rublev	8	ATP Finals, UK	Hard (i)	RR	6–3, 6–4	2
174.	(Greece) Stefanos Tsitsipas	6	ATP Finals, UK	Hard (i)	RR	6–4, 4–6, 6–2	2
2021
175.	(Greece) Stefanos Tsitsipas	5	Barcelona Open, Spain	Clay	F	6–4, 6–7^{(6–8)}, 7–5	3
176.	(Germany) Alexander Zverev	6	Italian Open, Italy	Clay	QF	6–3, 6–4	3
177.	(Serbia) Novak Djokovic	1	Italian Open, Italy	Clay	F	7–5, 1–6, 6–3	3
178.	(Argentina) Diego Schwartzman	10	French Open, France	Clay	QF	6–3, 4–6, 6–4, 6–0	3
2022
179.	(Italy) Matteo Berrettini	7	Australian Open, Australia	Hard	SF	6–3, 6–2, 3–6, 6–3	5
180.	(Russia) Daniil Medvedev	2	Australian Open, Australia	Hard	F	2–6, 6–7^{(5–7)}, 6–4, 6–4, 7–5	5
181.	(Russia) Daniil Medvedev	2	Mexican Open, Mexico	Hard	SF	6–3, 6–3	5
182.	(Canada) Félix Auger-Aliassime	9	French Open, France	Clay	4R	3–6, 6–3, 6–2, 3–6, 6–3	5
183.	(Serbia) Novak Djokovic	1	French Open, France	Clay	QF	6–2, 4–6, 6–2, 7–6^{(7–4)}	5
184.	(Germany) Alexander Zverev	3	French Open, France	Clay	SF	7–6^{(10–8)}, 6–6, ret.	5
185.	(Norway) Casper Ruud	8	French Open, France	Clay	F	6–3, 6–3, 6–0	5
186.	(Norway) Casper Ruud	4	ATP Finals, Italy	Hard (i)	RR	7–5, 7–5	2

== Winning streaks ==
=== 32 match win streak across 3 different surfaces ===
This is the longest match win streak, in tennis history, across 3 different surfaces with at least 2 tournaments played on each surface. The streak included five titles: two Grand Slams (French Open, Wimbledon), two Masters (Hamburg, Canada), and one ATP500 (Queen's Club Championships). Nadal won 12-consecutive matches on clay, 12-consecutive matches on grass, and 8-consecutive matches on hard courts.

No.	Tournament	Surface	Start date (tournament)	Rd	Opponent	Rank	Score
–	Rome Masters, Italy	Clay	5 May 2008	2R	(Spain) Juan Carlos Ferrero	23	5–7, 1–6
1	Hamburg Masters, Germany	Clay	11 May 2008	2R	(Italy) Potito Starace	45	6–4, 7–6^{(8–6)}
2	Hamburg Masters, Germany	Clay	11 May 2008	3R	(United Kingdom) Andy Murray	14	6–3, 6–2
3	Hamburg Masters, Germany	Clay	11 May 2008	QF	(Spain) Carlos Moyá	12	6–1, 6–3
4	Hamburg Masters, Germany	Clay	11 May 2008	SF	(Serbia) Novak Djokovic	3	7–5, 2–6, 6–2
5	Hamburg Masters, Germany	Clay	11 May 2008	F	(Switzerland) Roger Federer	1	7–5, 6–7^{(3–7)}, 6–3
6	French Open, France	Clay	25 May 2008	1R	(Brazil) Thomaz Bellucci	76	7–5, 6–3, 6–1
7	French Open, France	Clay	25 May 2008	2R	(France) Nicolas Devilder	148	6–4, 6–0, 6–1
8	French Open, France	Clay	25 May 2008	3R	(Finland) Jarkko Nieminen	26	6–1, 6–3, 6–1
9	French Open, France	Clay	25 May 2008	4R	(Spain) Fernando Verdasco	23	6–1, 6–0, 6–2
10	French Open, France	Clay	25 May 2008	QF	(Spain) Nicolás Almagro	20	6–1, 6–1, 6–1
11	French Open, France	Clay	25 May 2008	SF	(Serbia) Novak Djokovic (2)	3	6–4, 6–2, 7–6^{(7–4)}
12	French Open, France	Clay	25 May 2008	F	(Switzerland) Roger Federer (2)	1	6–1, 6–3, 6–0
13	Queen's, United Kingdom	Grass	9 June 2008	2R	(Sweden) Jonas Björkman	102	6–2, 6–2
14	Queen's, United Kingdom	Grass	9 June 2008	3R	(Japan) Kei Nishikori	113	6–4, 3–6, 6–3
15	Queen's, United Kingdom	Grass	9 June 2008	QF	(Croatia) Ivo Karlović	22	6–7^{(5–7)}, 7–6^{(7–5)}, 7–6^{(7–4)}
16	Queen's, United Kingdom	Grass	9 June 2008	SF	(United States) Andy Roddick	6	7–5, 6–4
17	Queen's, United Kingdom	Grass	9 June 2008	F	(Serbia) Novak Djokovic (3)	3	7–6^{(8–6)}, 7–5
18	Wimbledon Championships, United Kingdom	Grass	23 June 2008	1R	(Germany) Andreas Beck	122	6–4, 6–4, 7–6^{(7–0)}
19	Wimbledon Championships, United Kingdom	Grass	23 June 2008	2R	(Latvia) Ernests Gulbis	48	5–7, 6–2, 7–6^{(7–2)}, 6–3
20	Wimbledon Championships, United Kingdom	Grass	23 June 2008	3R	(Germany) Nicolas Kiefer	32	7–6^{(7–3)}, 6–2, 6–3
21	Wimbledon Championships, United Kingdom	Grass	23 June 2008	4R	(Russia) Mikhail Youzhny	17	6–3, 6–3, 6–1
22	Wimbledon Championships, United Kingdom	Grass	23 June 2008	QF	(United Kingdom) Andy Murray (2)	11	6–3, 6–2, 6–4
23	Wimbledon Championships, United Kingdom	Grass	23 June 2008	SF	(Germany) Rainer Schüttler	94	6–1, 7–6^{(7–3)}, 6–4
24	Wimbledon Championships, United Kingdom	Grass	23 June 2008	F	(Switzerland) Roger Federer (3)	1	6–4, 6–4, 6–7^{(5–7)}, 6–7^{(8–10)}, 9–7
25	Rogers Cup Toronto, Canada	Hard	21 July 2008	2R	(Canada) Jesse Levine	123	6–4, 6–2
26	Rogers Cup Toronto, Canada	Hard	21 July 2008	3R	(Russia) Igor Andreev	26	6–2, 7–6^{(7–1)}
27	Rogers Cup Toronto, Canada	Hard	21 July 2008	QF	(France) Richard Gasquet	12	6–7^{(12–14)}, 6–2, 6–1
28	Rogers Cup Toronto, Canada	Hard	21 July 2008	SF	(United Kingdom) Andy Murray (3)	9	7–6^{(7–2)}, 6–3
29	Rogers Cup Toronto, Canada	Hard	21 July 2008	F	(Germany) Nicolas Kiefer (2)	37	6–3, 6–2
30	Cincinnati Open, United States	Hard	28 July 2008	2R	(France) Florent Serra	84	6–0, 6–1
31	Cincinnati Open, United States	Hard	28 July 2008	3R	(Germany) Tommy Haas	42	6–4, 7–6^{(7–0)}
32	Cincinnati Open, United States	Hard	28 July 2008	QF	(Ecuador) Nicolás Lapentti	89	7–6^{(7–3)}, 6–1
–	Cincinnati Open, United States	Hard	28 July 2008	SF	(Serbia) Novak Djokovic	3	1–6, 5–7

=== 50 consecutive set win streak on clay ===
This is the longest single-surface and clay-court set win streak in the Open Era. Nadal broke John McEnroe's Open Era record of 49 consecutive sets won in 1984 (on carpet) with his 50th set win against Diego Schwartzman. He lost the next day in the quarterfinals to Dominic Thiem. Nadal also broke a 15-year-old record of Guillermo Coria achieved in 2003, where he won 35 consecutive sets on clay. This is followed by Ilie Năstase's 34 consecutive clay sets won in 1973. Nadal also had streaks of 32, 31, and two streaks of 30 consecutive clay sets won.

Breakdown: 6–0 (6), 6–1 (12), 6–2 (10), 6–3 (10), 6–4 (10), 7–5 (1), RET (1).

No.	Tournament	Start date (tournament)	Rd	Opponent	Rank	Score
–	Rome Masters, Italy	15 May 2017	QF	(Austria) Dominic Thiem	7	4–6, 3–6
1–3	French Open, France	29 May 2017	1R	(France) Benoît Paire	45	6–1, 6–4, 6–1
4–6	French Open, France	29 May 2017	2R	(Netherlands) Robin Haase	46	6–1, 6–4, 6–3
7–9	French Open, France	29 May 2017	3R	(Georgia (country)) Nikoloz Basilashvili	63	6–0, 6–1, 6–0
10–12	French Open, France	29 May 2017	4R	(Spain) Roberto Bautista Agut	18	6–1, 6–2, 6–2
13–14	French Open, France	29 May 2017	QF	(Spain) Pablo Carreño Busta	21	6–2, 2–0 ret
15–17	French Open, France	29 May 2017	SF	(Austria) Dominic Thiem	7	6–3, 6–4, 6–0
18–20	French Open, France	29 May 2017	F	(Switzerland) Stan Wawrinka	3	6–2, 6–3, 6–1
21–23	Davis Cup, Valencia, Spain	2 April 2018	RR	(Germany) Philipp Kohlschreiber	34	6–2, 6–2, 6–3
24–26	Davis Cup, Valencia, Spain	2 April 2018	RR	(Germany) Alexander Zverev	4	6–1, 6–4, 6–4
	Monte Carlo Masters, Monaco	16 April 2018	Bye			
27–28	Monte Carlo Masters, Monaco	16 April 2018	2R	(Slovenia) Aljaž Bedene	58	6–1, 6–3
29–30	Monte Carlo Masters, Monaco	16 April 2018	3R	(Russia) Karen Khachanov	38	6–3, 6–2
31–32	Monte Carlo Masters, Monaco	16 April 2018	QF	(Austria) Dominic Thiem (2)	7	6–0, 6–2
33–34	Monte Carlo Masters, Monaco	16 April 2018	SF	(Bulgaria) Grigor Dimitrov	5	6–4, 6–1
35–36	Monte Carlo Masters, Monaco	16 April 2018	F	(Japan) Kei Nishikori	36	6–3, 6–2
	Barcelona Open, Spain	23 April 2018	Bye			
37–38	Barcelona Open, Spain	23 April 2018	2R	(Spain) Roberto Carballés Baena	77	6–4, 6–4
39–40	Barcelona Open, Spain	23 April 2018	3R	(Spain) Guillermo García López	69	6–1, 6–3
41–42	Barcelona Open, Spain	23 April 2018	QF	(Slovakia) Martin Kližan	140	6–0, 7–5
43–44	Barcelona Open, Spain	23 April 2018	SF	(Belgium) David Goffin	10	6–4, 6–0
45–46	Barcelona Open, Spain	23 April 2018	F	(Greece) Stefanos Tsitsipas	63	6–2, 6–1
	Madrid Masters, Spain	7 May 2018	Bye			
47–48	Madrid Masters, Spain	7 May 2018	2R	(France) Gaël Monfils	41	6–3, 6–1
49–50	Madrid Masters, Spain	7 May 2018	3R	(Argentina) Diego Schwartzman	16	6–3, 6–4
–	Madrid Masters, Spain	7 May 2018	QF	(Austria) Dominic Thiem	7	5–7, 3–6

=== 81 match win streak on clay ===
Nadal's 81 clay-court match win streak from 04 April 2005 to 22 May 2007 is the longest single surface streak the Open Era, with John McEnroe’s 65-consecutive match wins on carpet, and Roger Federer’s 65-consecutive match wins on grass tied for second. Nadal would defeat world No.1 Roger Federer 5 times during this streak, before Federer would end it in the 2007 Hamburg Masters final on 22 May 2007, more than 25 months since it first began. The loss would be Nadal’s first in clay court final, having won his first 16-consecutive career clay court finals.

During this streak, Nadal would win 13 consecutive clay court titles, which included 3-consecutive Monte-Carlo Masters, 3-consecutive Barcelona Opens, 3-consecutive Rome Masters, and back-to-back French Opens. It should be mentioned that during this streak, Nadal also won hard court titles at the 2005 Canada Masters, 2005 China Open, 2005 Madrid Masters (indoor hard), 2006 Dubai, and 2007 Indian Wells Masters. Additionally, Nadal had 15 wins over top-10 opponents, 9 wins over top-5 opponents.

No.	Tournament	Tier	Start Date	Round	Opponent	Rank	Result	Score
–	Valencia Open	250	2005/4/4	QF	(Russia) Igor Andreev	47	Loss	5–7, 2–6
1	Monte-Carlo Masters	Masters	2005/4/11	1R	(France) Gaël Monfils	106	W	6–3, 6–2
2	Monte-Carlo Masters	Masters	2005/4/11	2R	(Belgium) Xavier Malisse	38	W	6–0, 6–3
3	Monte-Carlo Masters	Masters	2005/4/11	3R	(Belgium) Olivier Rochus	42	W	6–1, 6–2
4	Monte-Carlo Masters	Masters	2005/4/11	QF	(Argentina) Gastón Gaudio	6	W	6–3, 6–0
5	Monte-Carlo Masters	Masters	2005/4/11	SF	(France) Richard Gasquet	101	W	6–7^{(6–8)}, 6–4, 6–3
6	Monte-Carlo Masters	Masters	2005/4/11	F	(Argentina) Guillermo Coria	9	Win(1)	6–3, 6–1, 0–6, 7–5
	Barcelona Open	500 series	2005/4/18	1R	Bye			
7	Barcelona Open	500 series	2005/4/18	2R	(Luxembourg) Gilles Müller	64	W	6–0, 6–2
8	Barcelona Open	500 series	2005/4/18	3R	(Slovakia) Dominik Hrbatý	25	W	6–1, 6–2
9	Barcelona Open	500 series	2005/4/18	QF	(Argentina) Agustín Calleri	99	W	6–2, 3–0 RET
10	Barcelona Open	500 series	2005/4/18	SF	(Czech Republic) Radek Štěpánek	22	W	7–5, 6–2
11	Barcelona Open	500 series	2005/4/18	F	(Spain) Juan Carlos Ferrero	58	Win(2)	6–1, 7–6^{(7–4)}, 6–3
12	Italian Open	Masters	2005/5/2	1R	(Russia) Mikhail Youzhny	26	W	6–0, 6–2
13	Italian Open	Masters	2005/5/2	2R	(Romania) Victor Hănescu	85	W	6–1, 6–2
14	Italian Open	Masters	2005/5/2	3R	(Argentina) Guillermo Cañas	13	W	6–3, 6–1
15	Italian Open	Masters	2005/5/2	QF	(Czech Republic) Radek Štěpánek (2)	17	W	5–7, 6–1, 6–1
16	Italian Open	Masters	2005/5/2	SF	(Spain) David Ferrer	25	W	4–6, 6–4, 7–5
17	Italian Open	Masters	2005/5/2	F	(Argentina) Guillermo Coria (2)	11	Win(3)	6–4, 3–6, 6–3, 4–6, 7–6^{(8–6)}
18	French Open	Major	2005/5/23	1R	(Germany) Lars Burgsmüller	96	W	6–1, 7–6^{(7–4)}, 6–1
19	French Open	Major	2005/5/23	2R	(Belgium) Xavier Malisse (2)	46	W	6–2, 6–2, 6–4
20	French Open	Major	2005/5/23	3R	(France) Richard Gasquet (2)	31	W	6–4, 6–3, 6–2
21	French Open	Major	2005/5/23	4R	(France) Sébastien Grosjean	24	W	6–4, 3–6, 6–0, 6–3
22	French Open	Major	2005/5/23	QF	(Spain) David Ferrer (3)	21	W	7–5, 6–2, 6–0
23	French Open	Major	2005/5/23	SF	(Switzerland) Roger Federer	1	W	6–3, 4–6, 6–4, 6–3
24	French Open	Major	2005/5/23	F	(Argentina) Mariano Puerta	37	Win(4)	6–7^{(6–8)}, 6–3, 6–1, 7–5
25	Swedish Open	250 series	2005/7/4	1R	(Argentina) Juan Mónaco	66	W	6–1, 6–1
26	Swedish Open	250 series	2005/7/4	2R	(Spain) Alberto Martín	50	W	6–2, 6–4
27	Swedish Open	250 series	2005/7/4	QF	(Spain) Juan Carlos Ferrero (2)	31	W	6–3, 6–3
28	Swedish Open	250 series	2005/7/4	SF	(Spain) Tommy Robredo	20	W	6–3, 6–3
29	Swedish Open	250 series	2005/7/4	F	(Czech Republic) Tomáš Berdych	42	Win(5)	2–6, 6–2, 6–4
	Stuttgart Open	500 series	2005/7/18	1R	Bye			
30	Stuttgart Open	500 series	2005/7/18	2R	(United States) Hugo Armando	167	W	6–1, 6–2
31	Stuttgart Open	500 series	2005/7/18	3R	(Spain) Fernando Verdasco	58	W	6–3, 6–2
32	Stuttgart Open	500 series	2005/7/18	QF	(Czech Republic) Tomáš Zíb	57	W	6–2, 6–1
33	Stuttgart Open	500 series	2005/7/18	SF	(Finland) Jarkko Nieminen	66	W	6–2, 7–5
34	Stuttgart Open	500 series	2005/7/18	F	(Argentina) Gastón Gaudio (2)	13	Win(6)	6–3, 6–3, 6–4
35	ITA v. ESP WG PO	Davis Cup	2005/9/23	RR	(Italy) Daniele Bracciali	92	W	6–3, 6–2, 6–1
36	ITA v. ESP WG PO	Davis Cup	2005/9/23	RR	(Italy) Andreas Seppi	78	W	6–1, 6–2, 5–7, 6–4
37	Monte-Carlo Masters	Masters	2006/4/17	1R	(France) Arnaud Clément	56	W	6–4, 6–4
38	Monte-Carlo Masters	Masters	2006/4/17	2R	(Monaco) Jean-Rene Lisnard	154	W	6–4, 6–1
39	Monte-Carlo Masters	Masters	2006/4/17	3R	(Belgium) Kristof Vliegen	57	W	6–3, 6–3
40	Monte-Carlo Masters	Masters	2006/4/17	QF	(Argentina) Guillermo Coria (3)	9	W	6–2, 6–1
41	Monte-Carlo Masters	Masters	2006/4/17	SF	(Argentina) Gastón Gaudio (3)	8	W	5–7, 6–1, 6–1
42	Monte-Carlo Masters	Masters	2006/4/17	F	(Switzerland) Roger Federer (2)	1	Win(7)	6–2, 6–7^{(2–7)}, 6–3, 7–6^{(7–5)}
	Barcelona Open	500 series	2006/4/24	1R	Bye			
43	Barcelona Open	500 series	2006/4/24	2R	(Spain) Feliciano López	38	W	6–4, 6–2
44	Barcelona Open	500 series	2006/4/24	3R	(Spain) Iván Navarro	164	W	6–4, 6–2
45	Barcelona Open	500 series	2006/4/24	QF	(Finland) Jarkko Nieminen (2)	20	W	4–6, 6–4, 6–3
46	Barcelona Open	500 series	2006/4/24	SF	(Spain) Nicolás Almagro	57	W	7–6^{(7–2)}, 6–3
47	Barcelona Open	500 series	2006/4/24	F	(Spain) Tommy Robredo (2)	15	Win(8)	6–4, 6–4, 6–0
48	Italian Open	Masters	2006/5/8	1R	(Spain) Carlos Moyá	33	W	6–1, 2–6, 6–2
49	Italian Open	Masters	2006/5/8	2R	(Italy) Filippo Volandri	46	W	6–1, 6–2
50	Italian Open	Masters	2006/5/8	3R	(United Kingdom) Tim Henman	70	W	6–2, 6–2
51	Italian Open	Masters	2006/5/8	QF	(Chile) Fernando González	9	W	6–4, 6–3
52	Italian Open	Masters	2006/5/8	SF	(France) Gaël Monfils (2)	35	W	6–2, 6–2
53	Italian Open	Masters	2006/5/8	F	(Switzerland) Roger Federer (3)	1	Win(9)	6–7^{(0–7)}, 7–6^{(7–5)}, 6–4, 2–6, 7–6^{(7–5)}
54	French Open	Major	2006/5/29	1R	(Sweden) Robin Söderling	50	W	6–2, 7–5, 6–1
55	French Open	Major	2006/5/29	2R	(United States) Kevin Kim	116	W	6–2, 6–1, 6–4
56	French Open	Major	2006/5/29	3R	(France) Paul-Henri Mathieu	32	W	5–7, 6–4, 6–4, 6–4
57	French Open	Major	2006/5/29	4R	(Australia) Lleyton Hewitt	14	W	6–2, 5–7, 6–4, 6–2
58	French Open	Major	2006/5/29	QF	(Serbia) Novak Djokovic	63	W	6–4, 6–4 RET
59	French Open	Major	2006/5/29	SF	(Croatia) Ivan Ljubičić	4	W	6–4, 6–2, 7–6^{(9–7)}
60	French Open	Major	2006/5/29	F	(Switzerland) Roger Federer (4)	1	Win(10)	1–6, 6–1, 6–4, 7–6^{(7–4)}
61	ESP v. ITA WG PO	Davis Cup	2006/9/22	RR	(Italy) Andreas Seppi (2)	26	W	6–0, 6–4, 6–3
62	ESP v. ITA WG PO	Davis Cup	2006/9/22	RR	(Italy) Filippo Volandri (2)	11	W	3–6, 7–5, 6–3, 6–3
	Monte-Carlo Masters	Masters	2007/4/15	1R	Bye			
63	Monte-Carlo Masters	Masters	2007/4/15	2R	(Argentina) Juan Ignacio Chela	22	W	6–3, 6–1
64	Monte-Carlo Masters	Masters	2007/4/15	3R	(Belgium) Kristof Vliegen (2)	52	W	6–1, 6–1
65	Monte-Carlo Masters	Masters	2007/4/15	QF	(Germany) Philipp Kohlschreiber	59	W	6–3, 6–3
66	Monte-Carlo Masters	Masters	2007/4/15	SF	(Czech Republic) Tomáš Berdych (2)	14	W	6–0, 7–5
67	Monte-Carlo Masters	Masters	2007/4/15	F	(Switzerland) Roger Federer (5)	1	Win(11)	6–4, 6–4
	Barcelona Open	500 series	2007/4/23	1R	Bye			
68	Barcelona Open	500 series	2007/4/23	2R	(Belgium) Kristof Vliegen (3)	53	W	6–1, 6–2
69	Barcelona Open	500 series	2007/4/23	3R	(Sweden) Thomas Johansson	73	W	6–1, 6–4
70	Barcelona Open	500 series	2007/4/23	QF	(Italy) Potito Starace	72	W	6–2, 7–5
71	Barcelona Open	500 series	2007/4/23	SF	(Spain) David Ferrer (2)	16	W	7–5, 6–1
72	Barcelona Open	500 series	2007/4/23	F	(Argentina) Guillermo Cañas (2)	28	Win(12)	6–3, 6–4
	Italian Open	Masters	2007/5/7	1R	Bye			
73	Italian Open	Masters	2007/5/7	2R	(Italy) Daniele Bracciali (2)	125	W	6–4, 6–2
74	Italian Open	Masters	2007/5/7	3R	(Russia) Mikhail Youzhny (2)	16	W	6–2, 6–2
75	Italian Open	Masters	2007/5/7	QF	(Serbia) Novak Djokovic (2)	5	W	6–2, 6–3
76	Italian Open	Masters	2007/5/7	SF	(Russia) Nikolay Davydenko	4	W	7–6^{(7–3)}, 6–7^{(8–10)}, 6–4
77	Italian Open	Masters	2007/5/7	F	(Chile) Fernando González (2)	6	Win(13)	6–2, 6–2
	German Open	Masters	2007/5/14	1R	Bye			
78	German Open	Masters	2007/5/14	2R	(Spain) Oscar Hernandez	69	W	7–5, 6–1
79	German Open	Masters	2007/5/14	3R	(Russia) Igor Andreev	164	W	6–4, 6–1
80	German Open	Masters	2007/5/14	QF	(Chile) Fernando González (3)	5	W	6–4, 6–4
81	German Open	Masters	2007/5/14	SF	(Australia) Lleyton Hewitt (2)	21	W	2–6, 6–3, 7–5
–	German Open	Masters	2007/5/14	F	(Switzerland) Roger Federer	1	Loss(1)	6–2, 2–6, 0–6

=== 46 match win streak at the Monte-Carlo Masters ===
Between 2005 and 2013 inclusive, Nadal won 46 consecutive matches at the Monte Carlo Masters, which is a record for most consecutive wins at a single tournament by any man or woman in the Open Era. The streak began in the first round of the 2005 edition with a victory over Gaël Monfils, and ended in the final of the 2013 edition with a straight sets loss to Novak Djokovic.

During this streak, Nadal accumulated 15 Top 10 wins, nine Top 5 wins, and four wins against a top-ranked player (Roger Federer in the 2006, 2007 and 2008 finals, and Novak Djokovic in the 2012 final). He also won 31 consecutive sets in matches, starting with the final two sets of the 2006 final and ending with the loss of the second set in the 2009 final; this included all ten sets in 2007 and 2008. He then won the next 18 sets in succession, including winning all ten sets in 2010. During the 2010 event, Nadal lost only 14 games in five matches, while losing only one game in three of those matches, including in the final against Fernando Verdasco.

No.	Round	Opponent	Nation	Rank	Result	Score
2005
1	1R	Gaël Monfils	France	106	Win	6–3, 6–2
2	2R	Xavier Malisse	Belgium	38	Win	6–0, 6–3
3	3R	Olivier Rochus	Belgium	42	Win	6–1, 6–2
4	QF	Gastón Gaudio	Argentina	6	Win	6–3, 6–0
5	SF	Richard Gasquet	France	101	Win	6–7^{(6–8)}, 6–4, 6–3
6	F	Guillermo Coria	Argentina	9	Win	6–3, 6–1, 0–6, 7–5
2006
7	1R	Arnaud Clément	France	56	Win	6–4, 6–4
8	2R	Jean-René Lisnard	Monaco	154	Win	6–4, 6–1
9	3R	Kristof Vliegen	Belgium	57	Win	6–3, 6–3
10	QF	Guillermo Coria	Argentina	9	Win	6–2, 6–1
11	SF	Gastón Gaudio	Argentina	8	Win	5–7, 6–1, 6–1
12	F	Roger Federer	Switzerland	1	Win	6–2, 6–7^{(2–7)}, 6–3, 7–6^{(7–5)}
2007
13	2R	Juan Ignacio Chela	Argentina	22	Win	6–3, 6–1
14	3R	Kristof Vliegen	Belgium	52	Win	6–1, 6–1
15	QF	Philipp Kohlschreiber	Germany	59	Win	6–3, 6–3
16	SF	Tomáš Berdych	Czech Republic	14	Win	6–0, 7–5
17	F	Roger Federer	Switzerland	1	Win	6–4, 6–4
2008
18	2R	Mario Ančić	Croatia	55	Win	6–0, 6–3
19	3R	Juan Carlos Ferrero	Spain	24	Win	6–4, 6–1
20	QF	David Ferrer	Spain	5	Win	6–1, 7–5
21	SF	Nikolay Davydenko	Russia	4	Win	6–3, 6–2
22	F	Roger Federer	Switzerland	1	Win	7–5, 7–5
2009
23	2R	Juan Ignacio Chela	Argentina	167	Win	6–2, 6–3
24	3R	Nicolás Lapentti	Ecuador	98	Win	6–3, 6–0
25	QF	Ivan Ljubičić	Croatia	66	Win	6–3, 6–3
26	SF	Andy Murray	Great Britain	4	Win	6–2, 7–6^{(7–4)}
27	F	Novak Djokovic	Serbia	3	Win	6–3, 2–6, 6–1
2010
28	2R	Thiemo de Bakker	Netherlands	77	Win	6–1, 6–0
29	3R	Michael Berrer	Germany	51	Win	6–0, 6–1
30	QF	Juan Carlos Ferrero	Spain	16	Win	6–4, 6–2
31	SF	David Ferrer	Spain	17	Win	6–2, 6–3
32	F	Fernando Verdasco	Spain	12	Win	6–0, 6–1
2011
33	2R	Jarkko Nieminen	Finland	59	Win	6–2, 6–2
34	3R	Richard Gasquet	France	18	Win	6–2, 6–4
35	QF	Ivan Ljubičić	Croatia	40	Win	6–1, 6–3
36	SF	Andy Murray	Great Britain	4	Win	6–4, 2–6, 6–1
37	F	David Ferrer	Spain	6	Win	6–4, 7–5
2012
38	2R	Jarkko Nieminen	Finland	48	Win	6–4, 6–3
39	3R	Mikhail Kukushkin	Kazakhstan	68	Win	6–1, 6–1
40	QF	Stanislas Wawrinka	Switzerland	26	Win	7–5, 6–4
41	SF	Gilles Simon	France	15	Win	6–3, 6–4
42	F	Novak Djokovic	Serbia	1	Win	6–3, 6–1
2013
43	2R	Marinko Matosevic	Australia	54	Win	6–1, 6–2
44	3R	Philipp Kohlschreiber	Germany	21	Win	6–2, 6–4
45	QF	Grigor Dimitrov	Bulgaria	34	Win	6–2, 2–6, 6–4
46	SF	Jo-Wilfried Tsonga	France	8	Win	6–3, 7–6^{(7–3)}
	F	Novak Djokovic	Serbia	1	Loss	2–6, 6–7^{(1–7)}

=== 52 consecutive wins in semifinal matches on clay ===
From 2004 to 2014, Nadal went 52–0 in semifinals on clay. This is the all-time record for most consecutive semifinal wins on a single surface. He went 45–7 in the finals during this time. The streak was ended by Fabio Fognini at the 2015 Rio Open.

Memorable matches in this streak include the 2005 French Open semifinal against Roger Federer (the first ever Grand Slam meeting between the two), the 2009 Madrid Open semifinal and 2013 French Open semifinal against Novak Djokovic, the 2007 Italian Open semifinal against Nikolay Davydenko, the 2007 German Open semifinal against Lleyton Hewitt, and the 2005 Italian Open semifinal against David Ferrer. Nadal won 20 consecutive semifinals against Top 10 players and 12 consecutive against Top 5 players on clay.

No.	Tournament	Opponent	Nation	Rank	Result	Score	Final result
2004
1	Orange Prokom Open	Félix Mantilla	Spain	110	Win	7–5, 6–1	Defeated José Acasuso
2005
2	Brasil Open	Ricardo Mello	Brazil	56	Win	2–6, 6–2, 6–4	Defeated Alberto Martín
3	Mexico Open	Mariano Puerta	Argentina	74	Win	6–4, 6–1	Defeated Albert Montañés
4	Monte-Carlo Masters	Richard Gasquet	France	101	Win	6–7^{(6–8)}, 6–4, 6–3	Defeated Guillermo Coria
5	Barcelona Open	Radek Štěpánek	Czech Republic	22	Win	7–5, 6–2	Defeated Juan Carlos Ferrero
6	Italian Open	David Ferrer	Spain	25	Win	4–6, 6–4, 7–5	Defeated Guillermo Coria
7	French Open	Roger Federer	Switzerland	1	Win	6–3, 4–6, 6–4, 6–3	Defeated Mariano Puerta
8	Swedish Open	Tommy Robredo	Spain	20	Win	6–3, 6–3	Defeated Tomáš Berdych
9	Stuttgart Open	Jarkko Nieminen	Finland	22	Win	6–2, 7–5	Defeated Gastón Gaudio
2006
10	Monte-Carlo Masters	Gastón Gaudio	Argentina	8	Win	5–7, 6–1, 6–1	Defeated Roger Federer
11	Barcelona Open	Nicolás Almagro	Spain	57	Win	7–6^{(7–2)}, 6–3	Defeated Tommy Robredo
12	Italian Open	Gaël Monfils	France	35	Win	6–2, 6–2	Defeated Roger Federer
13	French Open	Ivan Ljubičić	Croatia	4	Win	6–4, 6–2, 7–6^{(9–7)}	Defeated Roger Federer
2007
14	Monte-Carlo Masters	Tomáš Berdych	Czech Republic	14	Win	6–0, 7–5	Defeated Roger Federer
15	Barcelona Open	David Ferrer	Spain	16	Win	7–5, 6–1	Defeated Guillermo Cañas
16	Italian Open	Nikolay Davydenko	Russia	4	Win	7–6^{(7–3)}, 6–7^{(8–10)}, 6–4	Defeated Fernando González
17	German Open	Lleyton Hewitt	Australia	21	Win	2–6, 6–3, 7–5	Lost to Roger Federer
18	French Open	Novak Djokovic	Serbia	6	Win	7–5, 6–4, 6–2	Defeated Roger Federer
19	Stuttgart Open	Feliciano López	Spain	84	Win	6–1, 7–5	Defeated Stan Wawrinka
2008
20	Monte-Carlo Masters	Nikolay Davydenko	Russia	4	Win	6–3, 6–2	Defeated Roger Federer
21	Barcelona Open	Denis Gremelmayr	Germany	85	Win	6–1, 6–0	Defeated David Ferrer
22	German Open	Novak Djokovic	Serbia	3	Win	7–5, 2–6, 6–2	Defeated Roger Federer
23	French Open	Novak Djokovic	Serbia	3	Win	6–4, 6–2, 7–6^{(7–3)}	Defeated Roger Federer
2009
24	Monte-Carlo Masters	Andy Murray	United Kingdom	4	Win	6–2, 7–6^{(7–4)}	Defeated Novak Djokovic
25	Barcelona Open	Nikolay Davydenko	Russia	8	Win	6–3, 6–2	Defeated David Ferrer
26	Italian Open	Fernando González	Chile	13	Win	6–3, 6–3	Defeated Novak Djokovic
27	Madrid Open	Novak Djokovic	Serbia	4	Win	3–6, 7–6^{(7–5)}, 7–6^{(11–9)}	Lost to Roger Federer
2010
28	Monte-Carlo Masters	David Ferrer	Spain	17	Win	6–2, 6–3	Defeated Fernando Verdasco
29	Italian Open	Ernests Gulbis	Latvia	40	Win	6–4, 3–6, 6–4	Defeated David Ferrer
30	Madrid Open	Nicolás Almagro	Spain	35	Win	4–6, 6–2, 6–2	Defeated Roger Federer
31	French Open	Jürgen Melzer	Austria	27	Win	6–2, 6–3, 7–6^{(8–6)}	Defeated Robin Söderling
2011
32	Monte-Carlo Masters	Andy Murray	United Kingdom	4	Win	6–4, 2–6, 6–1	Defeated David Ferrer
33	Barcelona Open	Ivan Dodig	Croatia	56	Win	6–3, 6–2	Defeated David Ferrer
34	Madrid Open	Roger Federer	Switzerland	3	Win	5–7, 6–1, 6–3	Lost to Novak Djokovic
35	Italian Open	Richard Gasquet	France	16	Win	7–5, 6–1	Lost to Novak Djokovic
36	French Open	Andy Murray	United Kingdom	4	Win	6–4, 7–5, 6–4	Defeated Roger Federer
2012
37	Monte-Carlo Masters	Gilles Simon	France	15	Win	6–3, 6–4	Defeated Novak Djokovic
38	Barcelona Open	Fernando Verdasco	Spain	20	Win	6–0, 6–4	Defeated David Ferrer
39	Italian Open	David Ferrer	Spain	6	Win	7–6^{(8–6)}, 6–0	Defeated Novak Djokovic
40	French Open	David Ferrer	Spain	6	Win	6–2, 6–2, 6–1	Defeated Novak Djokovic
2013
41	Chile Open	Jérémy Chardy	France	26	Win	6–2, 6–2	Lost to Horacio Zeballos
42	Brasil Open	Martín Alund	Argentina	111	Win	6–3, 6–7^{(2–7)}, 6–1	Defeated David Nalbandian
43	Mexican Open	Nicolás Almagro	Spain	12	Win	7–5, 6–4	Defeated David Ferrer
44	Monte-Carlo Masters	Jo-Wilfried Tsonga	France	8	Win	6–3, 7–6^{(7–3)}	Lost to Novak Djokovic
45	Barcelona Open	Milos Raonic	Canada	13	Win	6–4, 6–0	Defeated Nicolás Almagro
46	Madrid Open	Pablo Andújar	Spain	113	Win	6–0, 6–4	Defeated Stan Wawrinka
47	Italian Open	Tomáš Berdych	Czech Republic	6	Win	6–2, 6–4	Defeated Roger Federer
48	French Open	Novak Djokovic	Serbia	1	Win	6–4, 3–6, 6–1, 6–7^{(3–7)}, 9–7	Defeated David Ferrer
2014
49	Rio Open	Pablo Andújar	Spain	40	Win	2–6, 6–3, 7–6^{(12–10)}	Defeated Alexandr Dolgopolov
50	Madrid Open	Roberto Bautista Agut	Spain	45	Win	6–4, 6–3	Defeated Kei Nishikori
51	Italian Open	Grigor Dimitrov	Bulgaria	14	Win	6–2, 6–2	Lost to Novak Djokovic
52	French Open	Andy Murray	United Kingdom	8	Win	6–3, 6–2, 6–1	Defeated Novak Djokovic

=== 25 consecutive wins in Grand Slam matches ===
From the 2010 French Open to the fourth round of the 2011 Australian Open, Nadal went 25–0 at the majors. He became the first man to win 21 consecutive Grand Slam matches in a single calendar year since Rod Laver in 1969. The streak was ended by compatriot David Ferrer in the 2011 Australian Open. Prior to 2010, Roger Federer achieved two streaks of three consecutive major titles (winning at least 21 matches) but never within the same calendar year, as Federer's streaks always ended at the French Open to Nadal in the middle of the calendar year.

No.	Tournament	Surface	Start date	Rd	Opponent	Rank	Res	Score
–	2010 Australian Open	Hard	18 January 2010	QF	(United Kingdom) Andy Murray	#4	L	3–6, 6–7^{(2–7)}, 0–3 retired
1	2010 French Open	Clay	24 May 2010	R1	(France) Gianni Mina	#655	W	6–2, 6–2, 6–2
2	2010 French Open	Clay	24 May 2010	R2	(Argentina) Horacio Zeballos	#44	W	6–2, 6–2, 6–3
3	2010 French Open	Clay	24 May 2010	R3	(Australia) Lleyton Hewitt	#33	W	6–3, 6–4, 6–3
4	2010 French Open	Clay	24 May 2010	R4	(Brazil) Thomaz Bellucci	#29	W	6–2, 7–5, 6–4
5	2010 French Open	Clay	24 May 2010	QF	(Spain) Nicolás Almagro	#21	W	7–6^{(7–2)}, 7–6^{(7–3)}, 6–4
6	2010 French Open	Clay	24 May 2010	SF	(Austria) Jürgen Melzer	#27	W	6–2, 6–3, 7–6^{(8–6)}
7	2010 French Open	Clay	24 May 2010	F	(Sweden) Robin Söderling	#7	W	6–4, 6–2, 6–4
8	2010 Wimbledon	Grass	21 June 2010	R1	(Japan) Kei Nishikori	#189	W	6–4, 6–2, 6–4
9	2010 Wimbledon	Grass	21 June 2010	R2	(Netherlands) Robin Haase	#151	W	5–7, 6–2, 3–6, 6–0, 6–3
10	2010 Wimbledon	Grass	21 June 2010	R3	(Germany) Philipp Petzschner	#41	W	6–4, 4–6, 6–7^{(2–7)}, 6–2, 6–3
11	2010 Wimbledon	Grass	21 June 2010	R4	(France) Paul-Henri Mathieu	#66	W	6–4, 6–2, 6–4
12	2010 Wimbledon	Grass	21 June 2010	QF	(Sweden) Robin Söderling	#6	W	3–6, 6–3, 7–6^{(7–4)}, 6–1
13	2010 Wimbledon	Grass	21 June 2010	SF	(United Kingdom) Andy Murray	#4	W	6–4, 7–6^{(8–6)}, 6–4
14	2010 Wimbledon	Grass	21 June 2010	F	(Czech Republic) Tomáš Berdych	#13	W	6–3, 7–5, 6–4
15	2010 US Open	Hard	30 August 2010	R1	(Russia) Teymuraz Gabashvili	#93	W	7–6^{(7–4)}, 7–6^{(7–4)}, 6–3
16	2010 US Open	Hard	30 August 2010	R2	(Uzbekistan) Denis Istomin	#39	W	6–2, 7–6^{(7–5)}, 7–5
17	2010 US Open	Hard	30 August 2010	R3	(France) Gilles Simon	#42	W	6–4, 6–4, 6–2
18	2010 US Open	Hard	30 August 2010	R4	(Spain) Feliciano López	#25	W	6–3, 6–4, 6–4
19	2010 US Open	Hard	30 August 2010	QF	(Spain) Fernando Verdasco	#8	W	7–5, 6–3, 6–4
20	2010 US Open	Hard	30 August 2010	SF	(Russia) Mikhail Youzhny	#14	W	6–2, 6–3, 6–4
21	2010 US Open	Hard	30 August 2010	F	(Serbia) Novak Djokovic	#3	W	6–4, 5–7, 6–4, 6–2
22	2011 Australian Open	Hard	17 January 2011	R1	(Brazil) Marcos Daniel	#93	W	6–0, 5–0 retired
23	2011 Australian Open	Hard	17 January 2011	R2	(United States) Ryan Sweeting	#116	W	6–2, 6–1, 6–1
24	2011 Australian Open	Hard	17 January 2011	R3	(Australia) Bernard Tomic	#199	W	6–2, 7–5, 6–3
25	2011 Australian Open	Hard	17 January 2011	R4	(Croatia) Marin Čilić	#15	W	6–2, 6–4, 6–3
–	2011 Australian Open	Hard	17 January 2011	QF	(Spain) David Ferrer	#7	L	4–6, 2–6, 3–6

=== 14 French Open and 12 Barcelona Open final win streaks ===
Since 2005, Nadal has remained undefeated in French Open (14–0) and Barcelona Open (12–0) finals throughout his career. His 14 French Open and 12 Barcelona Open titles are the record most titles at the Grand Slams and ATP500 tiers. He has beaten a No. 1 ranked player five times in French Open finals and has never been taken to five sets in his 14 finals. Additionally, Nadal defeated his two biggest rivals in half of his finals, Federer (4x) and Djokovic (3x). Nadal's run at both tournaments constitute the two longest undefeated finals streaks in the Open Era (Novak Djokovic 7–0 in China Open finals and Pete Sampras 7–0 in Wimbledon finals are tied for third longest undefeated finals streak).

No.	Tournament	Opponent	Nation	Rank	Score
French Open
1	2005 French Open	Mariano Puerta	Argentina	37	6–7^{(6–8)}, 6–3, 6–1, 7–5
2	2006 French Open	Roger Federer	Switzerland	1	1–6, 6–1, 6–4, 7–6^{(7–4)}
3	2007 French Open	Roger Federer (2)	Switzerland	1	6–3, 4–6, 6–3, 6–4
4	2008 French Open	Roger Federer (3)	Switzerland	1	6–1, 6–3, 6–0
5	2010 French Open	Robin Söderling	Sweden	7	6–4, 6–2, 6–4
6	2011 French Open	Roger Federer (4)	Switzerland	3	7–5, 7–6^{(7–3)}, 5–7, 6–1
7	2012 French Open	Novak Djokovic	Serbia	1	6–4, 6–3, 2–6, 7–5
8	2013 French Open	David Ferrer	Spain	5	6–3, 6–2, 6–3
9	2014 French Open	Novak Djokovic (2)	Serbia	2	3–6, 7–5, 6–2, 6–4
10	2017 French Open	Stan Wawrinka	Switzerland	3	6–2, 6–3, 6–1
11	2018 French Open	Dominic Thiem	Austria	8	6–4, 6–3, 6–2
12	2019 French Open	Dominic Thiem (2)	Austria	4	6–3, 5–7, 6–1, 6–1
13	2020 French Open	Novak Djokovic (3)	Serbia	1	6–0, 6–2, 7–5
14	2022 French Open	Casper Ruud	Norway	8	6–3, 6–3, 6–0
Barcelona Open
1	2005 Barcelona Open	Juan Carlos Ferrero	Spain	58	6–1, 7–6^{(7–4)}, 6–3
2	2006 Barcelona Open	Tommy Robredo	Spain	15	6–4, 6–4, 6–0
3	2007 Barcelona Open	Guillermo Cañas	Argentina	28	6–3, 6–4
4	2008 Barcelona Open	David Ferrer	Spain	5	6–1, 4–6, 6–1
5	2009 Barcelona Open	David Ferrer (2)	Spain	13	6–2, 7–5
6	2011 Barcelona Open	David Ferrer (3)	Spain	6	6–2, 6–4
7	2012 Barcelona Open	David Ferrer (4)	Spain	6	7–6^{(7–1)}, 7–5
8	2013 Barcelona Open	Nicolás Almagro	Spain	12	6–4, 6–3
9	2016 Barcelona Open	Kei Nishikori	Japan	6	6–4, 7–5
10	2017 Barcelona Open	Dominic Thiem	Austria	9	6–4, 6–1
11	2018 Barcelona Open	Stefanos Tsitsipas	Greece	63	6–2, 6–1
12	2021 Barcelona Open	Stefanos Tsitsipas (2)	Greece	5	6–4, 6–7^{(6–8)}, 7–5

== ATP Tour career earnings ==
Year	Majors	ATP wins	Total wins	Earnings ($)	Money list rank
2001	0	0	0	$877
2002	0	0	0	$23,975	345
2003	0	0	0	$243,238	87
2004	0	1	1	$447,758	50
2005	1	10	11	$3,874,751	2
2006	1	4	5	$3,746,360	2
2007	1	5	6	$5,646,935	2
2008	2	6	8	$6,773,776	1
2009	1	4	5	$6,466,515	2
2010	3	4	7	$10,171,999	1
2011	1	2	3	$7,668,217	2
2012	1	3	4	$4,997,450	4
2013	2	8	10	$14,570,937	1
2014	1	3	4	$6,746,475	3
2015	0	3	3	$4,508,891	5
2016	0	2	2	$2,836,500	9
2017	2	4	6	$15,864,000	1
2018	1	4	5	$8,663,347	2
2019	2	2	4	$16,349,586	1
2020	1	1	2	$3,881,202	3
2021	0	2	2	$1,478,830	17
2022	2	2	4	$9,368,326	3
2023	0	0	0	$310,798	188
2024	0	0	0	$305,380	190
Career*	22	70	92	$134,946,100	2

== National and international representation ==
=== Davis Cup ===
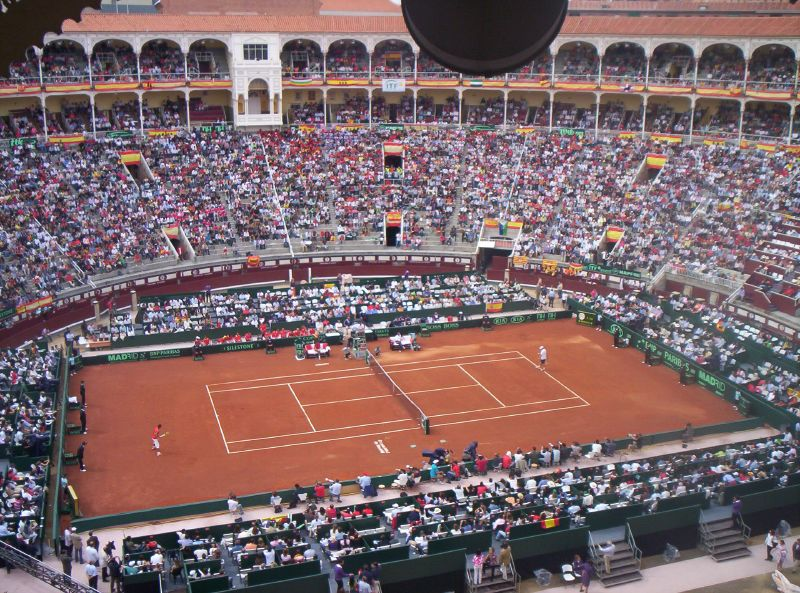
Nadal plays Andy Roddick at the Las Ventas bullring in Madrid, Spain during the 2008 Davis Cup semifinals. A clay court was specially constructed within the arena for the event.

Nadal played with La Armada in 2004, 2005, 2006, 2008, 2009, and 2011 winning the trophy in 2004, 2008 and 2009, as well as in 2011 and 2019 and fighting to remain in the World Group in 2005 and 2006. He was not able to play the final of the 2008 Davis Cup due to an injury of his left knee but he later received a replica of the cup given to the members of the Spanish team which played in Argentina, being David Ferrer, Marcel Granollers, Feliciano López and Fernando Verdasco.

==== Finals (4–0) ====
- Player considered as a part of Davis Cup winning team as nominated for the Finals.
- Player participation in ties is indicated in **BOLD**.

Edition	(Spain) Spanish team	Rounds/Opponents
2004 Davis Cup	Rafael Nadal; Carlos Moyá; Tommy Robredo; Juan Carlos Ferrero; Feliciano López; Alberto Martín	1R: Czech Republic 2–3 Spain; QF: Spain 4–1 Netherlands; SF: Spain 4–1 France; FN: Spain 3–2 USA
2008 Davis Cup	Rafael Nadal; David Ferrer; Feliciano López; Fernando Verdasco; Tommy Robredo; Nicolás Almagro	1R: Peru 0–5 Spain; QF: Germany 1–4 Spain; SF: Spain 4–1 USA; FN: Argentina 1–3 Spain
2009 Davis Cup	Rafael Nadal; Fernando Verdasco; David Ferrer; Feliciano López; Tommy Robredo; Juan Carlos Ferrero	1R: Spain 4–1 Serbia; QF: Spain 3–2 Germany; SF: Spain 4–1 Israel; FN: Spain 5–0 Czech Republic
2011 Davis Cup	Rafael Nadal; David Ferrer; Feliciano López; Fernando Verdasco; Marcel Granollers	1R: Belgium 1–4 Spain; QF: USA 1–3 Spain; SF: Spain 4–1 France; FN: Spain 3–1 Argentina
2019 Davis Cup	Rafael Nadal; Roberto Bautista Agut; Feliciano López; Pablo Carreño Busta; Marcel Granollers	RR: Spain 2–1 Russia; RR: Croatia 0–3 Spain; QF: Argentina 1–2 Spain; SF: Great Britain 1–2 Spain; FN: Canada 0–2 Spain

==== Davis Cup (37–6) ====
Group membership World Group / Finals (27–5) WG play-off / qualifiers (8–1) Group I (2–0)	Matches by surface Hard (14–2) Clay (22–2) Grass (0–0) Carpet (1–2)	Matches by type Singles (29–2) Doubles (8–4)	Matches by setting Indoors (19–4) Outdoors (18–2)	Matches by venue Spain (28–2) Away (9–4)

- ▲ ▼ indicates the result of the Davis Cup match followed by the score, date, place of event, the zonal classification and its phase, and the court surface.

Result	No.	Rubber	Match type (partner if any)	Opponent nation	Opponent player(s)	Score
▲3–2; 6–8 February 2004; Brno Exhibition Centre, Brno, Czech Republic; World Group first round; carpet(i) surface
Loss	1	I	Singles	Czech Republic	Jiří Novák	6–7^{(2–7)}, 3–6, 6–7^{(3–7)}
Loss	2	III	Doubles (with Tommy Robredo)	Czech Republic	Jiří Novák / Radek Štěpánek	4–6, 6–7^{(6–8)}, 3–6
Win	3	V	Singles (final)	Czech Republic	Radek Štěpánek	7–6^{(7–2)}, 7–6^{(7–4)}, 6–3
▲4–1; 9–11 April 2004; Plaza de Toros Coliseo, Palma de Mallorca, Spain; World Group quarterfinal; clay surface
Loss	4	III	Doubles (with Tommy Robredo)	Netherlands	John van Lottum / Martin Verkerk	6–3, 6–2, 3–6, 2–6, 2–6
▲3–2; 24–26 September 2004; Plaza de Toros de Alicante, Alicante, Spain; World Group semifinal; clay surface
Win	5	III	Doubles (with Tommy Robredo)	France	Arnaud Clément / Michaël Llodra	7–6^{(7–4)}, 4–6, 6–2, 2–6, 6–3
Win	6	IV	Singles	France	Arnaud Clément	6–4, 6–1, 6–2
▲3–2; 3–5 December 2004; Estadio Olímpico, Seville, Spain; World Group final; clay(i) surface
Win	7	II	Singles	United States	Andy Roddick	6–7^{(6–8)}, 6–2, 7–6^{(8–6)}, 6–2
▼1–4; 4–6 March 2005; National Tennis Centre, Bratislava, Slovakia; World Group 1st round; hard(i) surface
Loss	8	III	Doubles (with Albert Costa)	Slovakia	Karol Beck / Michal Mertiňák	6–7^{(3–7)}, 4–6, 6–7^{(8–10)}
▲3–2; 23–25 September 2005; Sporting Club Oplonti, Torre del Greco, Italy; World Group play-offs; clay surface
Win	9	II	Singles	Italy	Daniele Bracciali	6–3, 6–2, 6–1
Loss	10	III	Doubles (with Feliciano López)	Italy	Daniele Bracciali / Giorgio Galimberti	6–4, 4–6, 2–6, 6–4, 7–9
Win	11	IV	Singles	Italy	Andreas Seppi	6–1, 6–2, 5–7, 6–4
▲4–1; 22–24 September 2006; Real Sociedad de Tenis de La Magdalena, Santander, Spain; World Group play-offs; clay surface
Win	12	II	Singles	Italy	Andreas Seppi	6–0, 6–4, 6–3
Win	13	III	Doubles (with Fernando Verdasco)	Italy	Daniele Bracciali / Giorgio Galimberti	6–2, 3–6, 6–3, 7–6^{(7–4)}
Win	14	IV	Singles	Italy	Filippo Volandri	3–6, 7–5, 6–3, 6–3
▲4–1; 11–13 April 2008; AWD Dome, Bremen, Germany, World Group quarterfinal; hard(i) surface
Win	15	I	Singles	Germany	Nicolas Kiefer	7–6^{(7–5)}, 6–0, 6–3
▲4–1; 19–21 September 2008; Plaza de Toros de Las Ventas, Madrid, Spain; World Group semifinal; clay surface
Win	16	I	Singles	United States	Sam Querrey	6–7^{(5–7)}, 6–4, 6–3, 6–4
Win	17	IV	Singles	United States	Andy Roddick	6–4, 6–0, 6–4
▲4–1; 6–8 March 2009; Parque Temático Terra Mítica, Benidorm, Spain; World Group first round; clay surface
Win	18	II	Singles	Serbia	Janko Tipsarević	6–1, 6–0, 6–2
Win	19	IV	Singles	Serbia	Novak Djokovic	6–4, 6–4, 6–1
▲5–0; 4–6 December 2009; Palau Sant Jordi, Barcelona, Spain; World Group final; clay(i) surface
Win	20	I	Singles	Czech Republic	Tomáš Berdych	7–5, 6–0, 6–2
Win	21	IV	Singles	Czech Republic	Jan Hájek	6–3, 6–4
▲4–1; 4–6 March 2011; Spiroudome, Charleroi, Belgium; World Group 1st round; hard(i) surface
Win	22	II	Singles	Belgium	Ruben Bemelmans	6–2, 6–4, 6–2
Win	23	IV	Singles	Belgium	Olivier Rochus	6–4, 6–2
▲4–1; 16–18 September 2011; Plaza de Toros de los Califas, Córdoba, Spain; World Group semifinal; clay surface
Win	24	I	Singles	France	Richard Gasquet	6–3, 6–0, 6–1
Win	25	IV	Singles	France	Jo-Wilfried Tsonga	6–0, 6–2, 6–4
▲3–1; 2–4 December 2011; Estadio Olímpico, Seville, Spain; World Group final; clay(i) surface
Win	26	II	Singles	Argentina	Juan Mónaco	6–1, 6–1, 6–2
Win	27	IV	Singles	Argentina	Juan Martín del Potro	1–6, 6–4, 6–1, 7–6^{(7–0)}
▲5–0; 13–15 September 2013; Caja Mágica, Madrid, Spain; World Group play-offs; clay surface
Win	28	I	Singles	Ukraine	Sergiy Stakhovsky	6–0, 6–0, 6–4
Win	29	III	Doubles (with Marc López)	Ukraine	Denys Molchanov / Sergiy Stakhovsky	6–2, 6–7^{(6–8)}, 6–3, 6–4
▲5–0; 18–20 September 2015; Odense Idrætshal, Odense, Denmark; Group I Europe/Africa first round play-offs; hard(i) surface
Win	30	I	Singles	Denmark	Mikael Torpegaard	6–4, 6–3, 6–2
Win	31	III	Doubles (with Fernando Verdasco)	Denmark	Thomas Kromann / Frederik Nielsen	6–4, 3–6, 7–6^{(7–4)}, 6–4
▲5–0; 16–18 September 2016; R.K. Khanna Tennis Complex, New Delhi, India; World Group play-offs; hard surface
Win	32	III	Doubles (with Marc López)	India	Saketh Myneni / Leander Paes	4–6, 7–6^{(7–2)}, 6–4, 6–4
▲3–2; 6–8 April 2018; Plaza de Toros de Valencia, Valencia, Spain; World Group quarterfinal; clay surface
Win	33	II	Singles	Germany	Philipp Kohlschreiber	6–2, 6–2, 6–3
Win	34	IV	Singles	Germany	Alexander Zverev	6–1, 6–4, 6–4
▲2–1; 18–24 November 2019; Caja Mágica, Madrid, Spain; Davis Cup Finals – round robin; hard(i) surface
Win	35	II	Singles	Russia	Karen Khachanov	6–3, 7–6^{(9–7)}
▲3–0; 18–24 November 2019; Caja Mágica, Madrid, Spain; Davis Cup Finals – round robin; hard(i) surface
Win	36	II	Singles	Croatia	Borna Gojo	6–4, 6–3
Win	37	III	Doubles (with Marcel Granollers)	Croatia	Ivan Dodig / Mate Pavić	6–3, 6–4
▲2–1; 18–24 November 2019; Caja Mágica, Madrid, Spain; Davis Cup Finals – quarterfinal; hard(i) surface
Win	38	II	Singles	Argentina	Diego Schwartzman	6–1, 6–2
Win	39	III	Doubles (with Marcel Granollers)	Argentina	Máximo González / Leonardo Mayer	6–4, 4–6, 6–3
▲2–1; 18–24 November 2019; Caja Mágica, Madrid, Spain; Davis Cup Finals – semifinal; hard(i) surface
Win	40	II	Singles	(United Kingdom) Great Britain	Dan Evans	6–4, 6–0
Win	41	III	Doubles (with Feliciano López)	(United Kingdom) Great Britain	Jamie Murray / Neal Skupski	7–6^{(7–3)}, 7–6^{(10–8)}
▲2–0; 18–24 November 2019; Caja Mágica, Madrid, Spain; Davis Cup Finals – Final; hard(i) surface
Win	42	II	Singles	Canada	Denis Shapovalov	6–3, 7–6^{(9–7)}
▼1–2; 19–24 November 2024; Martin Carpena Arena, Málaga, Spain; Davis Cup Finals – quarterfinal; hard(i) surface
Loss	43	I	Singles	Netherlands	Botic van de Zandschulp	4–6, 4–6

=== Olympic Games ===
==== (19 wins – 6 losses) ====
Matches by tournament 2004 Athens Olympics (0–1) 2008 Beijing Olympics (7–1) 2016 Rio de Janeiro Olympics (9–2) 2024 Paris Olympics (3–2)	Olympic medals: 2 Gold medals: 2 Silver medals: 0 Bronze medals: 0 4th places: 1	Matches by type Singles (11–3) Doubles (8–3)	Matches by surface Hard (16–4) Clay (3–2)	Matches by medal finals Gold medal final (2–0) Bronze medal final (0–1)

==== Singles (11–3) ====
Round	Opponent	Result	Score
**2008 Beijing Summer Olympics**
1R	(Italy) Potito Starace	Win	6–2, 3–6, 6–2
2R	(Australia) Lleyton Hewitt	Win	6–1, 6–2
3R	(Russia) Igor Andreev	Win	6–4, 6–2
QF	(Austria) Jürgen Melzer	Win	6–0, 6–4
SF	(Serbia) Novak Djokovic	Win	6–4, 1–6, 6–4
F	(Chile) Fernando González	Win	6–3, 7–6^{(7–2)}, 6–3
**2016 Rio Summer Olympics**
1R	(Argentina) Federico Delbonis	Win	6–2, 6–1
2R	(Italy) Andreas Seppi	Win	6–3, 6–3
3R	(France) Gilles Simon	Win	7–6^{(7–5)}, 6–3
QF	(Brazil) Thomaz Bellucci	Win	2–6, 6–4, 6–2
SF	(Argentina) Juan Martín del Potro	Loss	7–5, 4–6, 6–7^{(5–7)}
BM	(Japan) Kei Nishikori	Loss	2–6, 7–6^{(7–1)}, 3–6
**2024 Paris Summer Olympics**
1R	(Hungary) Márton Fucsovics	Win	6–1, 4–6, 6–4
2R	(Serbia) Novak Djokovic	Loss	1–6, 4–6

==== Doubles (8–3) ====
Round	Partner	Opponents	Result	Score
**2004 Athens Summer Olympics**
1R	Carlos Moyá	(Brazil) André Sá / Flávio Saretta	Loss	6–7^{(6–8)}, 1–6
**2008 Beijing Summer Olympics**
1R	Tommy Robredo	(Sweden) Jonas Björkman / Robin Söderling	Win	6–3, 6–3
2R	Tommy Robredo	(Australia) Chris Guccione / Lleyton Hewitt	Loss	2–6, 6–7^{(5–7)}
**2016 Rio Summer Olympics**
1R	Marc López	(Netherlands) Robin Haase / Jean-Julien Rojer	Win	6–4, 6–4
2R	Marc López	(Argentina) Juan Martín del Potro / Máximo González	Win	6–3, 5–7, 6–2
QF	Marc López	(Austria) Oliver Marach / Alexander Peya	Win	6–3, 6–1
SF	Marc López	(Canada) Daniel Nestor / Vasek Pospisil	Win	7–6^{(7–1)}, 7–6^{(7–4)}
F	Marc López	(Romania) Florin Mergea / Horia Tecău	Win	6–2, 3–6, 6–4
**2024 Paris Summer Olympics**
1R	Carlos Alcaraz	(Argentina) Máximo González / Andrés Molteni	Win	7–6^{(7–4)}, 6–4
2R	Carlos Alcaraz	(Netherlands) Tallon Griekspoor / Wesley Koolhof	Win	6–4, 6–7^{(2–7)}, [10–2]
QF	Carlos Alcaraz	(United States) Austin Krajicek / Rajeev Ram	Loss	2–6, 4–6

==== Wins: 2 ====
Edition	(Spain) Spanish team	Rounds/Opponents
2008 Summer Olympics	Rafael Nadal	1R: ESP 2–1 ITA; 2R: ESP 2–0 AUS; 3R: ESP 2–0 RUS; QF: ESP 2–0 AUT; SF: ESP 2–1 SRB; **F-G: ESP 3–0 CHI**
2016 Summer Olympics	Rafael Nadal; Marc López	1R: ESP 2–0 NED; 2R: ESP 2–1 ARG; QF: ESP 2–0 AUT; SF: ESP 2–0 CAN; F-G: **ESP 2–1 ROM**

=== Laver Cup ===
==== Laver Cup matches (3–4) ====
Matches by type Singles (2–1) Doubles (1–3)	Matches by points scoring Day 1, 1 point (0–2) Day 2, 2 points (3–1) Day 3, 3 points (0–1)	Matches by venue Europe (3–4) Rest of the World (0–0)

- ▲ ▼ indicates the result of the Laver Cup match followed by the score, date, place of event and the court surface.

No.	Day (points)	Match type (partner if any)	Opponent team	Opponent player(s)	Result	Score
▲15–9; 22–24 September 2017; O2 Arena, Prague, Czech Republic, Hard(i) surface
1	Day 1 (1 point)	Doubles (with (Czech Republic) Tomáš Berdych)	Team World	(Australia) Nick Kyrgios / (United States) Jack Sock	Loss	3–6, 7–6^{(9–7)}, [7–10]
2	Day 2 (2 points)	Singles	Team World	(United States) Jack Sock	Win	6–3, 3–6, [11–9]
3	Day 2 (2 points)	Doubles (with (Switzerland) Roger Federer)	Team World	(United States) Sam Querrey / (United States) Jack Sock	Win	6–4, 1–6, [10–5]
4	Day 3 (3 points)	Singles	Team World	(United States) John Isner	Loss	5–7, 6–7^{(1–7)}
▲13–11; 20–22 September 2019; Palexpo, Geneva, Switzerland, Hard(i) surface
5	Day 2 (2 points)	Singles	Team World	(Canada) Milos Raonic	Win	6–3, 7–6^{(7–1)}
6	Day 2 (2 points)	Doubles (with (Greece) Stefanos Tsitsipas)	Team World	(Australia) Nick Kyrgios / (United States) Jack Sock	Loss	4–6, 6–3, [6–10]
23–25 September 2022; The O2 Arena, London, United Kingdom, Hard(i) surface
7	Day 1 (1 point)	Doubles (with (Switzerland) Roger Federer)	Team World	(United States) Jack Sock / (United States) Frances Tiafoe	Loss	6–4, 6–7^{(2–7)}, [9–11]

==== Wins: 2 ====
Edition	Team Europe	Rounds/Opponents
2017 Laver Cup	(Switzerland) Roger Federer (Spain) Rafael Nadal (Germany) Alexander Zverev (Croatia) Marin Čilić (Austria) Dominic Thiem (Czech Republic) Tomáš Berdych	F: EUR 15–9 WOR
2019 Laver Cup	(Switzerland) Roger Federer (Spain) Rafael Nadal (Germany) Alexander Zverev (Greece) Stefanos Tsitsipas (Austria) Dominic Thiem (Italy) Fabio Fognini	F: EUR 13–11 WOR

=== ATP Cup ===
==== Participations: 8 (6–2) ====
Matches by type
Singles (4–2)
Doubles (2–0)

No.	Surface	Rd	Match type (partner)	Opponent nation	Score	Opponent player(s)	Result	Match score
**2020**
3–9 January; Pat Rafter Arena, Brisbane, Australia
1.	Hard	RR	Singles	(Georgia (country)) Georgia	3–0	Nikoloz Basilashvili	Win	6–3, 7–5
2.	Hard	RR	Singles	Uruguay	3–0	Pablo Cuevas	Win	6–2, 6–1
3.	Hard	RR	Singles	Japan	3–0	Yoshihito Nishioka	Win	7–6^{(7–4)}, 6–4
4.	Hard	RR	Doubles (with Pablo Carreño Busta)	Japan	3–0	Ben McLachlan / Go Soeda	Win	7–6^{(7–5)}, 4–6, [10–6]
5.	Hard	QF	Singles	Belgium	2–1	David Goffin	Loss	4–6, 6–7^{(3–7)}
6.	Hard	QF	Doubles (with Pablo Carreño Busta)	Belgium	2–1	Sander Gillé / Joran Vliegen	Win	6–7^{(7–9)}, 7–5, [10–7]
7.	Hard	SF	Singles	Australia	3–0	Alex de Minaur	Win	4–6, 7–5, 6–1
8.	Hard	F	Singles	Serbia	1–2	Novak Djokovic	Loss	2–6, 6–7^{(4–7)}

=== United Cup ===
==== Participations: 2 (0–2) ====
Matches by type
Singles (0–2)
Doubles (0–0)

No.	Surface	Rd	Match type (partner)	Opponent nation	Score	Opponent player(s)	Result	Match score
**2023**
29 December–8 January; Ken Rosewall Arena, Sydney, Australia
1.	Hard	RR	Singles	(United Kingdom) Great Britain	1–4	Cameron Norrie	Loss	6–3, 3–6, 4–6
2.	Hard	RR	Singles	Australia	2–3	Alex de Minaur	Loss	6–3, 1–6, 5–7

== List of all losses on clay ==
#	Player	Rank	Event	Rd	Score	RNR
**2002**
1.	(Belgium) Olivier Rochus	70	Mallorca Open, Spain	2R	2–6, 2–6	762
**2003**
2.	(Argentina) Guillermo Coria	26	Monte-Carlo Masters, France	3R	6–7^{(3–7)}, 2–6	109
3.	(Spain) Àlex Corretja	17	Barcelona Open, Spain	2R	6–3, 2–6, 1–6	90
4.	(Argentina) Gastón Gaudio	29	Hamburg Masters, Germany	3R	2–6, 2–6	87
5.	(Ecuador) Nicolás Lapentti	76	Swedish Open, Sweden	QF	6–3, 3–6, 6–7^{(6–8)}	61
6.	(Chile) Fernando González	14	Stuttgart Open, Germany	2R	2–6, 6–3, 2–6	56
7.	(Spain) Carlos Moyá	4	Croatia Open, Croatia	SF	4–6, 4–6	58
**2004**
8.	(Argentina) Gastón Gaudio	11	Swedish Open, Sweden	QF	2–6, 3–6	60
9.	(Spain) David Ferrer	14	Stuttgart Open, Germany	QF	3–6, 7–6^{(7–3)}, 5–7	57
10.	(France) Olivier Mutis	113	Palermo Open, Italy	2R	3–6, 3–6	49
**2005**
11.	(Argentina) Gastón Gaudio	8	Argentina Open, Argentina	QF	6–0, 0–6, 1–6	48
12.	(Russia) Igor Andreev	47	Valencia Open, Spain	QF	5–7, 2–6	17
**2007**
13.	(Switzerland) Roger Federer	1	Hamburg Masters, Germany	F	6–2, 2–6, 0–6	2
**2008**
14.	(Spain) Juan Carlos Ferrero	23	Italian Open, Italy	2R	5–7, 1–6	2
**2009**
15.	(Switzerland) Roger Federer	2	Madrid Open, Spain	F	4–6, 4–6	1
16.	(Sweden) Robin Söderling	25	French Open, Paris, France	4R	2–6, 7–6^{(7–2)}, 4–6, 6–7^{(2–7)}	1
**2011**
17.	(Serbia) Novak Djokovic	2	Madrid Open, Spain	F	5–7, 4–6	1
18.	(Serbia) Novak Djokovic	2	Italian Open, Italy	F	4–6, 4–6	1
**2012**
19.	(Spain) Fernando Verdasco	19	Madrid Open, Spain	3R	3–6, 6–3, 5–7	2
**2013**
20.	(Argentina) Horacio Zeballos	73	Chile Open, Chile	F	7–6^{(7–2)}, 6–7^{(6–8)}, 4–6	5
21.	(Serbia) Novak Djokovic	1	Monte-Carlo Masters, France	F	2–6, 6–7^{(1–7)}	5
**2014**
22.	(Spain) David Ferrer	6	Monte-Carlo Masters, France	QF	6–7^{(1–7)}, 4–6	1
23.	(Spain) Nicolás Almagro	17	Barcelona Open, Spain	QF	6–2, 6–7^{(5–7)}, 4–6	1
24.	(Serbia) Novak Djokovic	2	Italian Open, Italy	F	6–4, 3–6, 3–6	1
**2015**
25.	(Italy) Fabio Fognini	28	Rio Open, Brazil	SF	6–1, 2–6, 5–7	3
26.	(Serbia) Novak Djokovic	1	Monte-Carlo Masters, France	SF	3–6, 3–6	5
27.	(Italy) Fabio Fognini	30	Barcelona Open, Spain	3R	4–6, 6–7^{(6–8)}	4
28.	(United Kingdom) Andy Murray	3	Madrid Open, Spain	F	3–6, 2–6	4
29.	(Switzerland) Stan Wawrinka	9	Italian Open, Italy	QF	6–7^{(7–9)}, 2–6	7
30.	(Serbia) Novak Djokovic	1	French Open, Paris, France	QF	5–7, 3–6, 1–6	7
**2016**
31.	(Austria) Dominic Thiem	19	Argentina Open, Argentina	SF	4–6, 6–4, 6–7^{(4–7)}	5
32.	(Uruguay) Pablo Cuevas	45	Rio Open, Brazil	SF	7–6^{(8–6)}, 6–7^{(3–7)}, 4–6	5
33.	(United Kingdom) Andy Murray	2	Madrid Open, Spain	SF	5–7, 4–6	5
34.	(Serbia) Novak Djokovic	1	Italian Open, Italy	QF	5–7, 6–7^{(4–7)}	5
**2017**
35.	(Austria) Dominic Thiem	7	Italian Open, Italy	QF	4–6, 3–6	4
**2018**
36.	(Austria) Dominic Thiem	7	Madrid Open, Spain	QF	5–7, 3–6	1
**2019**
37.	(Italy) Fabio Fognini	18	Monte-Carlo Masters, France	SF	4–6, 2–6	2
38.	(Austria) Dominic Thiem	5	Barcelona Open, Spain	SF	4–6, 4–6	2
39.	(Greece) Stefanos Tsitsipas	9	Madrid Open, Spain	SF	4–6, 6–2, 3–6	2
**2020**
40.	(Argentina) Diego Schwartzman	15	Italian Open, Italy	QF	2–6, 5–7	2
**2021**
41.	(Russia) Andrey Rublev	8	Monte-Carlo Masters, France	QF	2–6, 6–4, 2–6	3
42.	(Germany) Alexander Zverev	6	Madrid Open, Spain	QF	4–6, 4–6	2
43.	(Serbia) Novak Djokovic	1	French Open, Paris, France	SF	6–3, 3–6, 6–7^{(4–7)}, 2–6	3
**2022**
44.	(Spain) Carlos Alcaraz	9	Madrid Open, Spain	QF	2–6, 6–1, 3–6	4
45.	(Canada) Denis Shapovalov	16	Italian Open, Italy	3R	6–1, 5–7, 2–6	4
**2024**
46.	(Australia) Alex de Minaur	11	Barcelona Open, Spain	3R	5–7, 1–6	644
47.	(Czech Republic) Jiří Lehečka	31	Madrid Open, Spain	4R	5–7, 4–6	512
48.	(Poland) Hubert Hurkacz	9	Italian Open, Italy	2R	1–6, 3–6	305
49.	(Germany) Alexander Zverev	4	French Open, Paris, France	1R	3–6, 6–7^{(5–7)}, 3–6	275
50.	(Portugal) Nuno Borges	51	Swedish Open, Sweden	F	3–6, 2–6	261
51.	(Serbia) Novak Djokovic	2	Paris 2024 Olympics, France	2R	1–6, 4–6	159

Nadal has these win–loss records on clay.

- 484–51 overall
- 112–4 in French Open
- 200–27 in Masters Series/Masters 1000 (Monte Carlo, Hamburg, Rome, Madrid)
- 94–9 in International Series Gold/ATP 500 (Barcelona, Stuttgart, Acapulco, Rio, Hamburg)
- 19–0 in Davis Cup
- 1–1 in Olympics
- 138–4 in best-of-5-set matches
- 346–47 in best-of-3-set matches
- 63–9 in finals
- 102–25 against top 10
- 18–6 against No. 1
- 94–8 when he was No. 1

=== Head to head on clay ===
Active players are in boldface.

- (Serbia) **Novak Djokovic** 20–9
- (Austria) Dominic Thiem 8–4
- (Italy) Fabio Fognini 6–3
- (Argentina) Gastón Gaudio 3–3
- (Spain) David Ferrer 20–2
- (Switzerland) Roger Federer 14–2
- (United Kingdom) Andy Murray 7–2
- (Germany) **Alexander Zverev** 4–2
- (Spain) Nicolás Almagro 12–1
- (Spain) Fernando Verdasco 8–1
- (Switzerland) **Stan Wawrinka** 8–1
- (Spain) Juan Carlos Ferrero 5–1
- (Argentina) Diego Schwartzman 5–1
- (Chile) Fernando González 4–1
- (Spain) Carlos Moyá 4–1
- (Sweden) Robin Söderling 4–1
- (Argentina) Guillermo Coria 3–1
- (Greece) **Stefanos Tsitsipas** 3–1
- (Uruguay) Pablo Cuevas 2–1
- (Argentina) **Horacio Zeballos** 2–1
- (Canada) **Denis Shapovalov** 2–1
- (Russia) Igor Andreev 1–1
- (Ecuador) Nicolás Lapentti 1–1
- (Belgium) Olivier Rochus 1–1
- (Spain) **Carlos Alcaraz** 1–1
- (Australia) **Alex de Minaur** 1–1
- (Portugal) **Nuno Borges** 0–1
- (Spain) Àlex Corretja 0–1
- (France) Olivier Mutis 0–1
- (Russia) **Andrey Rublev** 0–1
- (Czech Republic) **Jiří Lehečka** 0–1
- (Poland) **Hubert Hurkacz** 0–1

Only players who have defeated Nadal on clay are listed.

*As of 2 August 2024

== Career milestone wins ==
=== Centennial match wins ===
#	Date	Age	Player	Event	Surface	Rd	Score
1.	29 April 2002	15 years, 10 months and 26 days	(Paraguay) Ramón Delgado	Majorca, Spain	Clay	1R	6–4, 6–4
100.	20 July 2005	19 years, 1 month and 17 days	(United States) Hugo Armando	**Stuttgart, Germany**	Clay	1R	6–1, 6–2
200.	28 March 2007	20 years, 9 months and 25 days	(Argentina) Juan Martín del Potro	Miami, United States	Hard	4R	6–4, 6–0
300.	13 June 2008	22 years and 10 days	(Croatia) Ivo Karlović	**London, England**	Grass	QF	6–7^{(5–7)}, 7–6^{(7–5)}, 7–6^{(7–4)}
400.	4 December 2009	23 years, 6 months and 1 day	(Czech Republic) Tomáš Berdych	**Davis Cup, Barcelona, Spain**	Clay (i)	F	7–5, 6–0, 6–2
500.	23 April 2011	24 years, 10 months and 20 days	(Croatia) Ivan Dodig	**Barcelona, Spain**	Clay	SF	6–3, 6–2
600.	18 March 2013	26 years, 9 months and 15 days	(Argentina) Juan Martín del Potro (2)	**Indian Wells, United States**	Hard	F	4–6, 6–3, 6–4
700.	24 June 2014	28 years and 21 days	(Slovakia) Martin Kližan	Wimbledon Championships, England	Grass	1R	4–6, 6–3, 6–3, 6–3
800.	12 August 2016	30 years, 2 months and 9 days	(Brazil) Thomaz Bellucci	Rio de Janeiro, Brazil	Hard	QF	2–6, 6–4, 6–2
900.	4 June 2018	32 years and 1 day	(Germany) Maximilian Marterer	**French Open, France**	Clay	4R	6–3, 6–2, 7–6^{(7–4)}
1000.	4 November 2020	34 years, 5 months and 1 day	(Spain) Feliciano López	Paris Masters, France	Hard (i)	2R	4–6, 7–6^{(7–5)}, 6–4

- Bold indicates that he went on to win the tournament.

=== Milestone Grand Slam wins ===
#	Date	Age	Player	Event	Surface	Rd	Score
1.	June 2003	17 years, 20 days	(Croatia) Mario Ančić	Wimbledon, London, England	Grass	1R	6–3, 6–4, 4–6, 6–4
100.	May 2010	23 years, 11 months	(France) Gianni Mina	**French Open, France**	Clay	1R	6–2, 6–2, 6–2
200.	May 2016	29 years, 11 months	(Argentina) Facundo Bagnis	French Open, France	Clay	2R	6–3, 6–0, 6–3
300.	May 2022	35 years, 11 months	(France) Corentin Moutet	**French Open, France**	Clay	2R	6–3, 6–1, 6–4

- Bold indicates that he went on to win the tournament.

=== Milestone hard court match wins ===
#	Date	Age	Player	Event	Surface	Rd	Score
1.	August 2003	17 years, 2 months	(Spain) Fernando Vicente	US Open, United States	Hard	1R	6–4, 6–3, 6–3
100.	January 2008	21 years, 7 months	(France) Mathieu Montcourt	Maharashtra Open, India	Hard	1R	6–2, 6–4
200.	March 2010	23 years, 9 months	(United States) Taylor Dent	Miami, United States	Hard	1R	6–4, 6–3
300.	September 2013	27 years, 3 months	(Colombia) Santiago Giraldo	Beijing, China	Hard	1R	6–2, 6–4
400.	April 2017	30 years, 10 months	(Italy) Fabio Fognini	Miami, United States	Hard	SF	6–1, 7–5
500.	January 2022	35 years, 7 months	(Italy) Matteo Berrettini	**Australian Open, Australia**	Hard	SF	6–3, 6–2, 3–6, 6–3

- Bold indicates that he went on to win the tournament.

=== Milestone grass court match wins ===
#	Date	Age	Player	Event	Surface	Rd	Score
1.	June 2003	17 years, 20 days	(Croatia) Mario Ančić	Wimbledon, London, England	Grass	1R	6–3, 6–4, 4–6, 6–4
50.	June 2012	26 years, 23 days	(Brazil) Thomaz Bellucci	Wimbledon, London, England	Grass	1R	7–6^{(7–0)}, 6–2, 6–3

=== Milestone clay court match wins ===
#	Date	Age	Player	Event	Surface	Rd	Score
1.	April 2002	15 years, 10 months	(Paraguay) Ramón Delgado	Majorca, Spain	Clay	1R	6–4, 6–4
100.	June 2006	20 years, 8 days	(Switzerland) Roger Federer	**French Open, Paris, France**	Clay	F	1–6, 6–1, 6–4, 7–6^{(7–4)}
200.	May 2010	23 years, 11 months	(Brazil) Thomaz Bellucci	**French Open, Paris, France**	Clay	4R	6–2, 7–5, 6–4
300.	April 2014	27 years, 10 months	(Italy) Andreas Seppi	Monte Carlo, Monaco	Clay	3R	6–1, 6–3
400.	April 2018	31 years, 10 months	(Belgium) David Goffin	**Barcelona, Spain**	Clay	SF	6–4, 6–0

- Bold indicates that he went on to win the tournament.

== Junior national representation ==
=== Junior Davis Cup (8–0) ===
Rubber result	No.	Rubber	Match type (partner if any)	Opponent nation	Opponent player(s)	Score
▲3–0; 9–14 September 2002; Tennis Country Club La Baule, La Baule-Escoublac, France; Junior Davis Cup – round robin; clay surface
Victory	1	II	Singles	Japan	Kenichiro Nakahara	7–6^{(7–3)}, 6–1
▲3–0; 9–14 September 2002; Tennis Country Club La Baule, La Baule-Escoublac, France; Junior Davis Cup – round robin; clay surface
Victory	2	II	Singles	South Africa	Fritz Wolmarans	6–1, 6–2
▲3–0; 9–14 September 2002; Tennis Country Club La Baule, La Baule-Escoublac, France; Junior Davis Cup – round robin; clay surface
Victory	3	II	Singles	Greece	Zacharias Katsigiannakis	6–0, 6–2
Victory	4	III	Doubles (with Tomeu Salvà)	Greece	Ioannis Kakkalos / Apostolos Triantis	6–2, 6–3
▲3–0; 9–14 September 2002; Tennis Country Club La Baule, La Baule-Escoublac, France; Junior Davis Cup – semifinal; clay surface
Victory	5	II	Singles	Uruguay	Pablo Cuevas	6–4, 6–1
Victory	6	III	Doubles (with Marcel Granollers)	Uruguay	Pablo Cuevas / Federico Sansonetti	6–1, 6–4
▲3–0; 9–14 September 2002; Tennis Country Club La Baule, La Baule-Escoublac, France; Junior Davis Cup – Final; clay surface
Victory	7	II	Singles	United States	Brendan Evans	6–2, 6–2
Victory	8	III	Doubles (with Marcel Granollers)	United States	Scott Oudsema / Phillip Simmonds	7–6^{(7–5)}, 6–3

== Exhibition matches ==
=== Singles ===
Result	Date	Tournament	Surface	Opponent	Score
Win	Sep 2001	Santa Ponça, Spain	Clay	(Australia) Pat Cash	7–5, 2–6, 12–10
Win	Dec 2003	Máster Castilla y León, Valladolid, Spain	Carpet (i)	(Spain) David Ferrer	6–3, 7–5
Win	Dec 2003	Máster Castilla y León, Valladolid, Spain	Carpet (i)	(Spain) Carlos Moyá	6–4, 4–6, 7–5
Loss	Dec 2003	Máster Castilla y León, Valladolid, Spain	Carpet (i)	(Spain) Albert Costa	3–6, 3–6
Win	Jul 2004	I Trofeu Illes Balears, Calvià, Spain	Clay	(France) Fabrice Santoro	4–7, 7–2, 7–3
Loss	Jul 2004	I Trofeu Illes Balears, Calvià, Spain	Clay	(Spain) Carlos Moyá	5–7, 5–7
Win	Dec 2004	Máster Ciudad de León, León, Spain	Hard (i)	(Spain) David Sánchez	6–3, 6–2
Win	Dec 2004	Máster Ciudad de León, León, Spain	Hard (i)	(Spain) Carlos Moyá	6–4, 6–4
Win	Dec 2004	Máster Ciudad de León, León, Spain	Hard (i)	(Spain) Fernando Verdasco	7–6^{(8–6)}, 7–5
Win	Jul 2005	II Trofeu Illes Balears, Calvià, Spain	Clay	(Germany) Rainer Schüttler	7–5, 7–5
Win	Jul 2005	II Trofeu Illes Balears, Calvià, Spain	Clay	(Spain) Tomeu Salvà	7–1, 7–2
Win	Jul 2005	II Trofeu Illes Balears, Calvià, Spain	Clay	(Spain) David Ferrer	6–3, 6–2
Loss	Dec 2005	Partit contra sa fam, Palma de Mallorca, Spain	Hard (i)	(Spain) Carlos Moyá	6–9
Win	Feb 2006	Les Petits As Match d'Exhibition, Tarbes, France	Hard (i)	(France) Fabrice Santoro	6–2, 1–6, 10–3
Win	May 2006	III Trofeu Illes Balears, Calvià, Spain	Clay	(Belgium) Xavier Malisse	6–3, 6–4
Loss	Jul 2006	Torneig Badia dels Tarongers, Cullera, Spain	Clay	(Spain) David Ferrer	6–10, 10–6, 13–15, 10–7, 12–14
Win	Oct 2006	Homenatge a Joan Bosch, Maó, Spain	Carpet (i)	(Spain) Carlos Moyá	7–5, 4–6, 7–5
Loss	Nov 2006	Hyundai Card Super Match, Seoul, South Korea	Hard (i)	(Switzerland) Roger Federer	3–6, 6–3, 3–6
Win	Apr 2007	IV Trofeu Illes Balears, Calvià, Spain	Clay	(Argentina) David Nalbandian	7–6^{(7–4)}, 6–2
Win	Apr 2007	IV Trofeu Illes Balears, Calvià, Spain	Clay	(Spain) Carlos Moyá	7–6^{(7–2)}, 3–6, 6–1
Win	May 2007	Battle of Surfaces, Palma de Mallorca, Spain	Clay/Grass	(Switzerland) Roger Federer	7–5, 4–6, 7–6^{(12–10)}
Win	Oct 2007	Betfair Turbo Tennis, Zaragoza, Spain	Hard (i)	(Spain) Carlos Moyá	8–4
Loss	Oct 2007	Betfair Turbo Tennis, Zaragoza, Spain	Hard (i)	(Spain) David Ferrer	5–7
Win	Nov 2007	Clash of the Titans, Kuala Lumpur, Malaysia	Hard (i)	(France) Richard Gasquet	3–6, 6–2, 6–3
Win	Jan 2009	World Tennis Championship, UAE	Hard	(Russia) Nikolay Davydenko	6–2, 6–3
Loss	Jan 2009	World Tennis Championship, UAE	Hard	(United Kingdom) Andy Murray	4–6, 7–5, 3–6
Loss	May 2009	Roland Garros Journée Benny Berthet, Paris, France	Clay	(Argentina) Brian Dabul	5–7
Loss	Jun 2009	2009 BNP Paribas Tennis Classic, Hurlingham, UK	Grass	(Australia) Lleyton Hewitt	4–6, 3–6
Loss	Jun 2009	2009 BNP Paribas Tennis Classic, Hurlingham, UK	Grass	(Switzerland) Stan Wawrinka	6–4, 6–7^{(6–8)}, 3–10
Win	Jan 2010	World Tennis Championship, UAE	Hard	(Spain) David Ferrer	7–6^{(7–3)}, 6–3
Win	Jan 2010	World Tennis Championship, UAE	Hard	(Sweden) Robin Söderling	7–6^{(7–3)}, 7–5
Loss	Dec 2010	Match for Africa, Zurich, Switzerland	Hard (i)	(Switzerland) Roger Federer	6–4, 3–6, 3–6
Win	Dec 2010	Joining Forces for the Benefit of Children, Madrid, Spain	Hard (i)	(Switzerland) Roger Federer	7–6^{(7–3)}, 4–6, 6–1
Win	Jan 2011	World Tennis Championship, UAE	Hard	(Czech Republic) Tomáš Berdych	6–4, 6–4
Win	Jan 2011	World Tennis Championship, UAE	Hard	(Switzerland) Roger Federer	7–6^{(7–4)}, 7–6^{(7–3)}
Win	Mar 2011	Nike Clash of the Champions, Eugene, Oregon, USA	Hard (i)	(Switzerland) Roger Federer	7–5
Win	Mar 2011	Encuentro Bancolombia, Bogotá, Colombia	Hard (i)	(Serbia) Novak Djokovic	7–6^{(7–5)}, 6–3
Win	Oct 2011	Tots amb l'Andreu, Barcelona, Spain	Hard (i)	(Spain) Tommy Robredo	10–8
Win	Oct 2011	Tots amb l'Andreu, Barcelona, Spain	Hard (i)	(Spain) Albert Montañés	10–8
Win	Oct 2011	Tots amb l'Andreu, Barcelona, Spain	Hard (i)	(Spain) David Ferrer	10–6
Loss	Dec 2011	World Tennis Championship, UAE	Hard	(Spain) David Ferrer	3–6, 2–6
Win	Dec 2011	World Tennis Championship, UAE	Hard	(Switzerland) Roger Federer	6–1, 7–5
Win	Jun 2013	2013 BNP Paribas Tennis Classic, Hurlingham, UK	Grass	(Japan) Kei Nishikori	7–6^{(7–3)}, 7–6^{(7–4)}
Loss	Nov 2013	Copa Movistar, Santiago de Chile, Chile	Hard (i)	(Serbia) Novak Djokovic	6–7^{(3–7)}, 4–6
Loss	Nov 2013	Orfeo Superdomo, Córdoba, Argentina	Hard (i)	(Argentina) David Nalbandian	4–6, 6–7^{(6–8)}
Win	Nov 2013	La Rural, Buenos Aires, Argentina	Hard	(Argentina) David Nalbandian	6–3, 6–4
Win	Nov 2013	Buenos Aires, Argentina	Hard	(Serbia) Novak Djokovic	6–4, 7–5
Loss	Dec 2013	World Tennis Championship, UAE	Hard	(Spain) David Ferrer	4–6, 4–6
Win	Dec 2013	World Tennis Championship, UAE	Hard	(France) Jo-Wilfried Tsonga	7–6^{(7–5)}, 6–3
Win	Jun 2014	2014 BNP Paribas Tennis Classic, Hurlingham, UK	Grass	(Spain) Tommy Robredo	7–5, 6–3
Win	Sep 2014	Astana, Kazakhstan	Hard (i)	(France) Jo-Wilfried Tsonga	6–7^{(2–7)}, 6–3, 6–4
Loss	Jan 2015	World Tennis Championship, UAE	Hard	(United Kingdom) Andy Murray	2–6, 0–6
Win	Jan 2015	World Tennis Championship, UAE	Hard	(Switzerland) Stanislas Wawrinka	7–6^{(7–1)}, 6–3
Win	Jan 2015	Fast4, Melbourne, Australia	Hard	(Australia) Omar Jasika	4–1
Win	Jan 2015	Fast4, Melbourne, Australia	Hard	(Australia) Mark Philippoussis	4–1
Win	Jan 2015	Fast4, Melbourne, Australia	Hard	(Spain) Fernando Verdasco	2–4, 4–3, 4–3, 3–4, 4–2
Win	Jun 2015	The Boodles Tennis Challenge, Buckinghamshire, UK	Grass	(Netherlands) Robin Haase	6–4, 6–2
Loss	Oct 2015	Back to Thailand, Bangkok, Thailand	Hard (i)	(Serbia) Novak Djokovic	4–6, 2–6
Win	Dec 2015	International Premier Tennis League, India	Hard (i)	(Switzerland) Roger Federer	6–5^{(7–4)}
Win	Jan 2016	World Tennis Championship, UAE	Hard	(Spain) David Ferrer	6–3, 6–7^{(4–7)}, 6–3
Win	Jan 2016	World Tennis Championship, UAE	Hard	(Canada) Milos Raonic	7–6^{(7–2)}, 6–3
Loss	Jan 2016	Fast4, Sydney, Australia	Hard	(Australia) Lleyton Hewitt	2–4, 2–4
Win	Mar 2016	San Juan, Puerto Rico	Hard (i)	(Dominican Republic) Víctor Estrella Burgos	6–4, 6–4
Loss	Sep 2016	Djokovic & Friends, Milan, Italy	Hard (i)	(Serbia) Novak Djokovic	4–6, 4–6
Win	Dec 2016	World Tennis Championship, UAE	Hard	(Czech Republic) Tomáš Berdych	6–0, 6–4
Win	Dec 2016	World Tennis Championship, UAE	Hard	(Canada) Milos Raonic	6–1, 3–6, 6–3
Win	Dec 2016	World Tennis Championship, UAE	Hard	(Belgium) David Goffin	6–4, 7–6^{(7–5)}
Loss	Jan 2017	Fast4, Sydney, Australia	Hard	(Australia) Nick Kyrgios	3–4, 4–2, 3–4, 3–4
Loss	Jun 2017	2017 Aspall Tennis Classic, Hurlingham, UK	Grass	(Czech Republic) Tomáš Berdych	3–6, 2–6
Win	Jun 2017	2017 Aspall Tennis Classic, Hurlingham, UK	Grass	(Germany) Tommy Haas	6–4, 2–6, 10–7
Loss	Jan 2018	2018 Priceline Pharmacy Kooyong Classic, Melbourne, Australia	Hard	(France) Richard Gasquet	4–6, 5–7
Win	Jan 2018	Tie Break Tens, Melbourne, Australia	Hard	(France) Lucas Pouille	10–1
Win	Jan 2018	Tie Break Tens, Melbourne, Australia	Hard	(Australia) Lleyton Hewitt	13–11
Loss	Jan 2018	Tie Break Tens, Melbourne, Australia	Hard	(Czech Republic) Tomáš Berdych	5–10
Win	Jan 2018	Australian Open Preparation, Melbourne, Australia	Hard	(Austria) Dominic Thiem	6–7^{(4–7)}, 6–2, 10–8
Win	Jun 2018	2018 Aspall Tennis Classic, Hurlingham, UK	Grass	(Australia) Matthew Ebden	7–6^{(7–3)}, 7–5
Loss	Jun 2018	2018 Aspall Tennis Classic, Hurlingham, UK	Grass	(France) Lucas Pouille	6–7^{(10–12)}, 5–7
Loss	Dec 2018	World Tennis Championship, UAE	Hard	(South Africa) Kevin Anderson	6–4, 3–6, 4–6
Loss	Jan 2019	Fast4, Sydney, Australia	Hard	(Australia) Nick Kyrgios	0–4, 4–3, 3–5
Win	Mar 2019	Eisenhower Cup, Indian Wells Tennis Garden, California, USA	Hard	(United States) Taylor Fritz	10–8
Loss	Mar 2019	Eisenhower Cup, Indian Wells Tennis Garden, California, USA	Hard	(Switzerland) Stan Wawrinka	11–13
Loss	Jun 2019	2019 Aspall Tennis Classic, Hurlingham, UK	Grass	(Croatia) Marin Čilić	3–6, 3–6
Loss	Jun 2019	2019 Aspall Tennis Classic, Hurlingham, UK	Grass	(France) Lucas Pouille	3–6, 6–4, 5–10
Win	Oct 2019	Nur-Sultan, Kazakhstan	Hard (i)	(Serbia) Novak Djokovic	6–3, 3–6, 11–9
Win	Dec 2019	World Tennis Championship, UAE	Hard	(Russia) Karen Khachanov	6–1, 6–3
Win	Dec 2019	World Tennis Championship, UAE	Hard	(Greece) Stefanos Tsitsipas	6–7^{(3–7)}, 7–5, 7–6^{(7–3)}
Win	Feb 2020	Rafa Nadal Academy Kuwait, Kuwait	Hard	(Spain) David Ferrer	6–4, 6–3
Loss	Feb 2020	The Match in Africa 6, Cape Town, South Africa	Hard	(Switzerland) Roger Federer	4–6, 6–3, 3–6
Win	Mar 2020	Atlanta Challenge Exhibition, Atlanta, USA	Hard (i)	(Bulgaria) Grigor Dimitrov	7–5, 6–3
Win	Jan 2021	A Day at The Drive, Adelaide, Australia	Hard	(Austria) Dominic Thiem	7–5, 6–4
Loss	Dec 2021	World Tennis Championship, UAE	Hard	(United Kingdom) Andy Murray	3–6, 5–7
Loss	Dec 2021	World Tennis Championship, UAE	Hard	(Canada) Denis Shapovalov	7–6^{(7–4)}, 3–6, 6–10
Win	Jun 2022	2022 Giorgio Armani Tennis Classic, Hurlingham, UK	Grass	(Switzerland) Stan Wawrinka	6–2, 6–3
Loss	Jun 2022	2022 Giorgio Armani Tennis Classic, Hurlingham, UK	Grass	(Canada) Félix Auger-Aliassime	6–7^{(6–8)}, 6–4, 3–10
Win	Nov 2022	La Revancha, Buenos Aires, Argentina	Hard (i)	(Norway) Casper Ruud	7–6^{(10–8)}, 6–2
Win	Nov 2022	Copa Museo de la Moda, Santiago, Chile	Hard	(Chile) Alejandro Tabilo	7–6^{(8–6)}, 6–3
Win	Nov 2022	Belo Horizonte, Brazil	Hard (i)	(Norway) Casper Ruud	7–6^{(7–4)}, 7–5
Loss	Nov 2022	Copa Kia Quito Bicentenario, Quito, Ecuador	Hard (i)	(Norway) Casper Ruud	4–6, 4–6
Win	Nov 2022	Copa Electrolit, Bogotá, Colombia	Hard (i)	(Norway) Casper Ruud	7–5, 6–4
Win	Dec 2022	2022 Tennis Fest, Mexico City, Mexico	Hard	(Norway) Casper Ruud	7–6^{(9–7)}, 6–4
Loss	Mar 2024	The Netflix Slam, Las Vegas, United States	Hard	(Spain) Carlos Alcaraz	6–3, 4–6, [12–14]
Loss	Oct 2024	6 Kings Slam, Riyadh, Saudi Arabia	Hard	(Spain) Carlos Alcaraz	3–6, 3–6
Loss	Oct 2024	6 Kings Slam, Riyadh, Saudi Arabia	Hard	(Serbia) Novak Djokovic	2–6, 6–7^{(5–7)}

=== Doubles ===
Result	Date	Tournament	Surface	Partner	Opponent	Score
Loss	May 2006	III Trofeu Illes Balears, Calvià, Spain	Clay	(Spain) Carlos Moyá	(Belgium) Xavier Malisse (Belarus) Max Mirnyi	1–6, 2–6
Loss	Mar 2010	Hit for Haiti 2, Indian Wells Tennis Garden, California, USA	Hard	(United States) Andre Agassi	(Switzerland) Roger Federer (United States) Pete Sampras	6–8
Loss	Mar 2011	Nike Clash of the Champions, United States	Hard (i)	(Belarus) Victoria Azarenka	(Switzerland) Roger Federer (Russia) Maria Sharapova	3–6
Win	Nov 2013	Buenos Aires, Argentina	Hard	(Serbia) Novak Djokovic	(Argentina) David Nalbandian (Argentina) Juan Mónaco	6–4
Win	Jan 2016	Fast4, Sydney, Australia	Hard	(France) Gaël Monfils	(Australia) Nick Kyrgios (Australia) Lleyton Hewitt	4–3, 4–3
Win	Sep 2016	Rafa Nadal Sports Centre, Manacor, Spain	Hard	(Spain) Simón Solbas	(United States) John McEnroe (Spain) Carlos Moyá	3–6, 6–3, [10–8]
Win	Jan 2019	Fast4, Sydney, Australia	Hard	(Canada) Milos Raonic	(Australia) Nick Kyrgios (Australia) John Millman	4–1, 1–4, 5–4
Loss	Feb 2020	The Match in Africa 6, Cape Town, South Africa	Hard	(South Africa) Trevor Noah	(Switzerland) Roger Federer (United States) Bill Gates	3–6
Win	Aug 2022	New York City, United States	Hard	(Poland) Iga Świątek	(United States) Coco Gauff (United States) John McEnroe	[10–8]
Win	Nov 2022	Buenos Aires, Argentina	Hard (i)	(Argentina) Gabriela Sabatini	(Argentina) Gisela Dulko (Norway) Casper Ruud	6–4

=== Team competitions ===
Result	No.	Tournament	Surface	Team	Partners	Opponent team	Opponent players	Score
Win	May 2009	Masters Guinot-Mary Cohr, Paris, France	Clay	Team Guinot	(Russia) Marat Safin (C) (Switzerland) Roger Federer (United Kingdom) Andy Murray (Spain) Tommy Robredo (France) Gaël Monfils	Team Mary Cohr	(United States) James Blake (C) (Switzerland) Stan Wawrinka (Cyprus) Marcos Baghdatis (France) Arnaud Clément (France) Fabrice Santoro (France) Paul-Henri Mathieu	4–2
Loss	Jan 2010	Hit for Haiti; Melbourne, Australia	Hard	Team Blue	(Serbia) Novak Djokovic (United States) Andy Roddick (Belgium) Kim Clijsters (Australia) Bernard Tomic (S)	Team Red	(Switzerland) Roger Federer (Australia) Lleyton Hewitt (United States) Serena Williams (Australia) Samantha Stosur (S)	6–7
Win	Jan 2011	Rally for Relief 2, Melbourne, Australia	Hard	Team Green	(Australia) Patrick Rafter (C) (Belgium) Kim Clijsters (United States) Andy Roddick (United Kingdom) Andy Murray (Belarus) Victoria Azarenka (Russia) Vera Zvonareva	Team Gold	(Australia) Lleyton Hewitt (C) (Switzerland) Roger Federer (Australia) Samantha Stosur (Swap player) (Serbia) Novak Djokovic (Belgium) Justine Henin (Serbia) Ana Ivanovic (Denmark) Caroline Wozniacki	44–43
Win	Jan 2020	AO Rally for Relief, Melbourne, Australia	Hard	Team Williams	(United States) Serena Williams (C) (Serbia) Novak Djokovic (Austria) Dominic Thiem (Czech Republic) Petra Kvitová	Team Wozniacki	(Denmark) Caroline Wozniacki (C) (Germany) Alexander Zverev (Greece) Stefanos Tsitsipas (Japan) Naomi Osaka (United States) Coco Gauff	4–3^{(5–2)}

== See also ==
- List of career achievements by Rafael Nadal
- Open Era tennis records – Men's singles
- All-time tennis records – Men's singles
- List of male singles tennis players
- List of male doubles tennis players
- List of Grand Slam men's singles champions
- List of tennis title leaders in the Open Era
- List of Open Era Grand Slam champions by country
- List of ATP number 1 ranked singles tennis players
- List of highest ranked tennis players per country
- List of flag bearers for Spain at the Olympics
- 2016 Summer Olympics national flag bearers
- Spain Davis Cup team
- List of Spain Davis Cup team representatives
- Tennis in Spain
- Sport in Spain
- ATP Finals appearances
- Big Four career statistics
- Big Three
