= Novak Djokovic career statistics =

Statistics of Serbian tennis player

Career finals
Discipline	Type	Won	Lost	Total
Singles
Singles	Grand Slam	24	14	38
Singles	ATP Finals	7	2	9
Singles	ATP 1000	40	20	60
Singles	ATP 500	16	3	19
Singles	ATP 250	14	5	19
Singles	Olympics	1	0	1
Singles	Total	102	44	146
Doubles
Doubles	Grand Slam	–	–	–
Doubles	ATP Finals	–	–	–
Doubles	ATP 1000	–	–	–
Doubles	ATP 500	–	–	–
Doubles	ATP 250	1	2	3
Doubles	Olympics	–	–	–
Doubles	Total	1	2	3

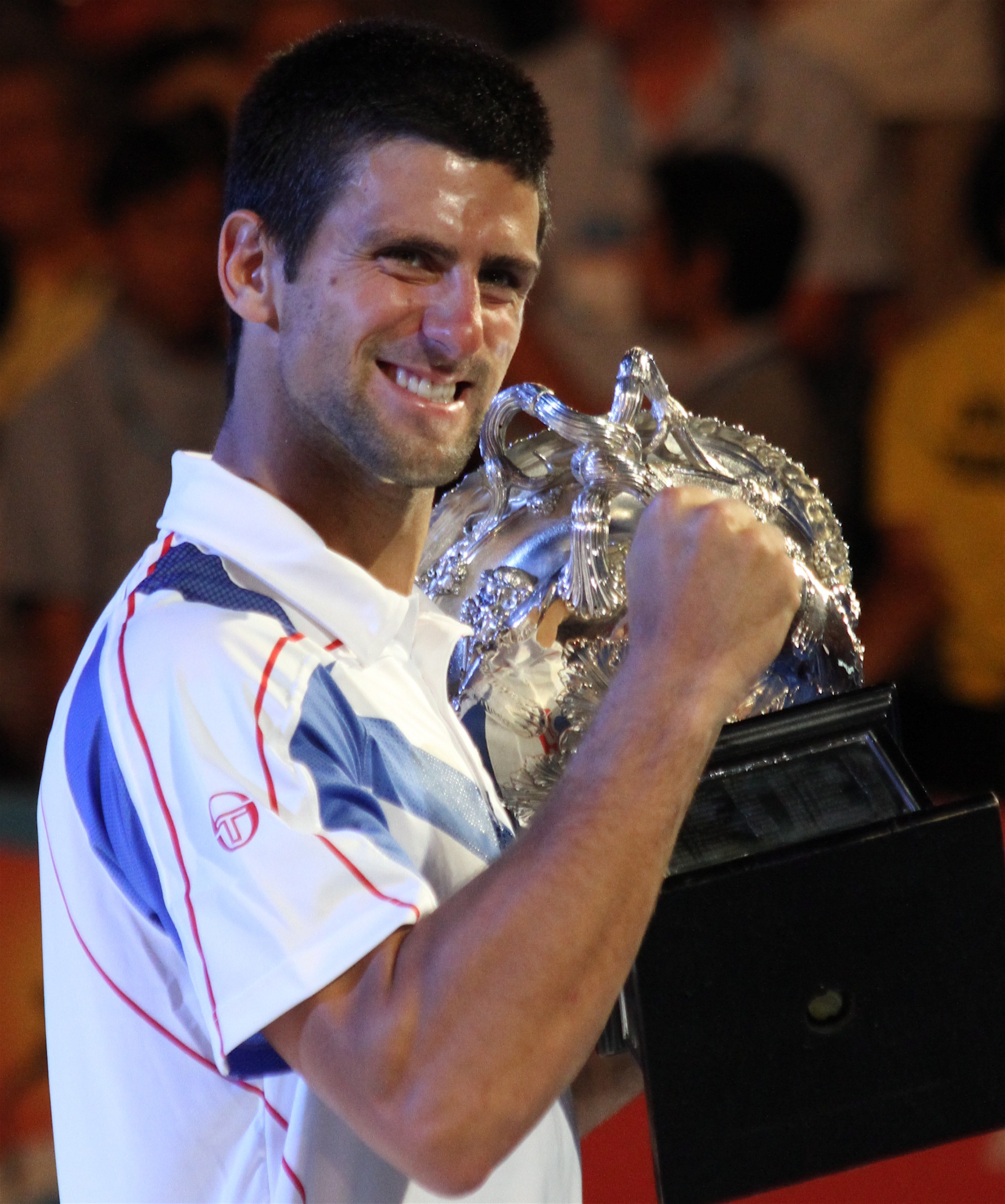
Novak Djokovic after winning the 2011 Australian Open title.

== Performance timelines ==
Key
W	F	SF	QF	#R	RR	Q#	P#	DNQ	A	Z#	PO	G	S	B	NMS	NTI	P	NH

(W) winner; (F) finalist; (SF) semifinalist; (QF) quarterfinalist; (#R) rounds 4, 3, 2, 1; (RR) round-robin stage; (Q#) qualification round; (P#) preliminary round; (DNQ) did not qualify; (A) absent; (Z#) Davis/Fed Cup Zonal Group (with number indication) or (PO) play-off; (G) gold, (S) silver or (B) bronze Olympic/Paralympic medal; (NMS) not a Masters tournament; (NTI) not a Tier I tournament; (P) postponed; (NH) not held; (SR) strike rate (events won / competed); (W–L) win–loss record.
To avoid confusion and double counting, these charts are updated at the conclusion of a tournament or when the player's participation has ended.

=== Singles ===
Current through the 2026 Paris Masters.

Tournament	2004	2005	2006	2007	2008	2009	2010	2011	2012	2013	2014	2015	2016	2017	2018	2019	2020	2021	2022	2023	2024	2025	2026	SR	W–L	Win %
Grand Slam tournaments
Australian Open	A	1R	1R	4R	W	QF (Note: Djokovic withdrew from 2024 French Open (QF) and retired from 2005 French Open (2R), 2006 French Open (QF), 2007 Wimbledon (SF), 2009 Australian Open (QF), 2017 Wimbledon (QF), 2019 US Open (4R), 2025 Australian Open (SF).)	QF	W	W	W	QF	W	W	2R	4R	W	W	W	A (Note: Prior 2022 Australian Open Djokovic lost his ability to compete when his visa to enter Australia was cancelled and he was deported from the country due to intervention of Australian government. Australian Minister for Immigration used his personal power to cancel Djokovic's visa because that would be in public interest and his presence in Australia is or may be, or would or might be, a risk to the health, safety or good order of the Australian community or a segment of the Australian community. There was no requirement upon the Minister in exercising those powers of his to afford Djokovic natural justice (that is procedural fairness). He had been seeded 1st.)	W	SF	SF	F (Note: Djokovic's opponents withdrew before their matches at the 2011 French Open (QF), 2016 US Open (2R), 2024 Wimbledon (QF), 2026 Australian Open (4R), which does not officially count as a win.)	10 / 21	104–11	90%
French Open	A	2R	QF	SF	SF	3R	QF	SF	F	SF	F	F	W	QF	QF	SF	F	W	QF	W	QF	SF	3R	3 / 22	103–18	85%
Wimbledon	A	3R	4R	SF	2R	QF	SF	W	SF	F	W	W	3R	QF	W	W	NH^{*}	W	W	F	F	SF	SF	7 / 21	107–14	88%
US Open	A	3R	3R	F	SF	SF	F	W	F	F	SF	W	F	A	W	4R	4R (Note: Djokovic was disqualified and fined, with his ranking points and prize money rescinded, after accidentally striking a linesperson in the neck with a tennis ball.)	F	A (Note: Djokovic withdrew from the 2022 US Open due to the federal government's COVID-19 vaccination policy for non-US citizens.)	W	3R	SF	1R	4 / 20	95–16	86%
Win–loss	0–0	5–4	9–4	19–4	18–3	15–4	19–4	25–1	24–3	24–3	22–3	27–1	21–2	9–3	21–2	22–2	16–2	27–1	11–1	27–1	16–3	20–4	12–4	24 / 84	409–59	87%
Year-end championships
ATP Finals	Did not qualify			RR	W	RR	SF	RR	W	W	W	W	F	DNQ	F	RR	SF	SF	W	W	A (Note: Qualified but did not compete due to injury)		DNQ	7 / 16	50–18	74%
National representation
Summer Olympics (Note: 2020 Summer Olympics is postponed to 2021 due to COVID-19 pandemic.)	A	Not held			B	Not held			4th	Not held			1R	Not held				4th	Not held		G	Not held		1 / 5	19–6	76%
Davis Cup	Z2	Z1	PO	PO	1R	1R	W	SF	A	F	A	QF	QF	SF	A	QF	NH	SF	A	SF	WG1	A	A	1 / 11	41–8	84%
ATP 1000 tournaments
Indian Wells Open	A	A	1R	F	W	QF	4R	W	SF	SF	W	W	W	4R	2R	3R	NH^{*}	A	A	A	3R	2R	4R	5 / 17	53–12	82%
Miami Open	A	A	2R	W	2R	F	2R	W	W	4R	W	W	W	A	2R	4R	NH^{*}	A	A	A	A	F	A	6 / 14	49–8	86%
Monte-Carlo Masters	A	A	1R	3R	SF	F	SF	A	F	W	SF	W	2R	QF	3R	QF	NH^{*}	3R	2R	3R	SF	2R	A	2 / 18	39–16	71%
Madrid Open (Note: Held as Hamburg Masters (outdoor clay) until 2008, Madrid Masters (outdoor clay) 2009 – present.)	A	A	2R	QF	SF	SF	A	W	QF	2R	A	A	W	SF	2R	W	NH^{*}	A	SF	A	A	2R	A	3 / 13	30–10	75%
Italian Open	A	A	Q2	QF	W	F	QF	W	F	QF	W	W	F	F	SF	F	W	F	W	QF	3R	A	2R	6 / 19	68–13	84%
Canadian Open	A	Q2	A	W	QF	QF	SF	W	W	SF	3R	F	W	A	3R	A	NH^{*}	A	A	A	A	A	A	4 / 11	37–7	84%
Cincinnati Open	A	1R	2R	2R	F	F	QF	F	F	QF	3R	F	A	A	W	SF	W	A	A	W	A	A	2R	3 / 16	45–13	78%
Shanghai Masters (Note: Held as Madrid Masters (indoor hard) from 2002 to 2008, and Shanghai Masters (outdoor hard) 2009 – present.)	A	Q1	QF	SF	3R	SF	SF	A	W	W	SF	W	SF	A	W	QF	Not held^{*}			A	F	SF	2R	4 / 15	49–11	82%
Paris Masters	A	3R	2R	2R	3R	W	3R	QF	2R	W	W	W	QF	A	F	W	A	W	F	W	A	A	2R	7 / 18	51–10	84%
Win–loss	0–0	2–2	5–7	24–7	25–7	33–8	16–8	33–1	34–6	28–6	28–4	39–2	31–4	10–4	24–7	23–6	10–0	9–2	11–3	14–2	10–4	9–5	3–5	40 / 141	421–100	81%
Career statistics
Statistic	2004	2005	2006	2007	2008	2009	2010	2011	2012	2013	2014	2015	2016	2017	2018	2019	2020	2021	2022	2023	2024	2025	2026	SR	W–L	Win %
Tournaments (Note: Including appearances in Grand Slam and ATP World Tour main draw matches, in Summer Olympics, and not included in Davis Cup, Laver Cup, ATP Cup and the United Cup.)	3	9	19	22	19	22	19	15	17	16	15	16	16	10	16	15	8	11	11	12	10	13	11	Career total: 325		
Titles	0	0	2	5	4	5	2	10	6	7	7	11	7	2	4	5	4	5	5	7	1	2	1	Career total: 102		
Finals	0	0	3	7	7	10	4	11	11	9	8	15	10	3	7	6	5	7	7	8	3	3	2	Career total: 146		
Hard W–L	0–1	2–3	17–9	43–12	43–12	53–11	43–12	46–5	50–5	53–5	40–6	59–5	47–6	12–3	31–7	35–8	30–4	30–4	21–3	38–3	16–5	25–7	14–7	73 /200	748–143	84%
Clay W–L	1–2	4–5	14–5	19–5	16–3	17–6	12–4	17–1	16–4	15–3	14–2	16–1	16–2	12–4	11–5	15–3	11–1	18–3	14–4	12–3	16–3	9–3	2–2	21 / 92	297–74	80%
Grass W–L	0–0	2–1	4–2	6–2	5–2	8–2	6–2	7–0	9–3	6–1	7–0	7–0	2–1	8–1	11–1	7–0	0–0	7–0	7–0	6–1	5–1	5–1	5–1	8 / 29	130–22	86%
Carpet W–L	1–0	3–2	5–2	0–0	0–0	Discontinued																		0 / 4	9–4	69%
Overall win–loss (Note: Including matches in Grand Slam, in ATP World Tour, in Summer Olympics, in Davis Cup, Laver Cup, ATP Cup and the United Cup.)	2–3	11–11	40–18	68–19	64–17	78–19	61–18	70–6	75–12	74–9	61–8	82–6	65–9	32–8	53–13	57–11	41–5	55–7	42–7	56–7	37–9	39–11	21–10	102 / 325	1184–243	83%
Win %	40%	50%	69%	78%	79%	80%	77%	92%	86%	89%	88%	93%	88%	80%	80%	84%	89%	89%	86%	89%	80%	78%	68%	Career total: 83%		
Year-end ranking	186	78	16	3	3	3	3	1	1	2	1	1	2	12	1	2	1	1	5	1	7	4	12	$197,006,276		

=== Doubles ===
Tournament	2004	2005	2006	2007	2008	2009	2010	2011	2012	2013	2014	2015	2016	2017	2018	2019	2020	2021	2022	2023	2024	2025	2026	SR	W–L	Win%
Grand Slam tournaments
Australian Open	A	A	1R	1R	A	A	A	A	A	A	A	A	A	A	A	A	A	A	A	A	A	A	A	0 / 2	0–2	0%
French Open	A	A	1R	A	A	A	A	A	A	A	A	A	A	A	A	A	A	A	A	A	A	A	A	0 / 1	0–1	0%
Wimbledon	A	A	2R	A	A	A	A	A	A	A	A	A	A	A	A	A	NH^{*}	A	A	A	A	A	A	0 / 1	1–1	50%
US Open	A	A	1R	A	A	A	A	A	A	A	A	A	A	A	A	A	A	A	A	A	A	A	A	0 / 1	0–1	0%
Win–loss	0–0	0–0	1–4	0–1	0–0	0–0	0–0	0–0	0–0	0–0	0–0	0–0	0–0	0–0	0–0	0–0	0–0	0–0	0–0	0–0	0–0	0–0	0–0	0 / 5	1–5	17%
National representation
Summer Olympics	A	not held			1R	not held			1R	not held			2R	not held				A	not held		A	NH		0 / 3	1–3	25%
Davis Cup	Z2	Z1	PO	PO	1R	1R	W	SF	A	F	A	QF	QF	SF	A	QF	NH	SF	A	SF	WG1	A	A	1 / 12	5–8	38%
ATP 1000 tournaments
Indian Wells Open	A	A	A	1R	A	A	A	QF	1R	A	1R	A	A	QF	A	SF	NH^{*}	A	A	A	A	A	2R	0 / 7	8–7	53%
Miami Open	A	A	A	A	A	A	A	1R	A	A	A	1R	A	A	1R	A	NH^{*}	A	A	A	A	A	A	0 / 3	0–3	0%
Monte-Carlo Masters	A	A	A	1R	2R	SF	2R	A	A	A	A	A	A	2R	A	1R	NH^{*}	A	A	A	A	A	A	0 / 6	6–6	50%
Madrid Open	A	A	A	A	A	QF	A	A	A	A	A	A	A	A	A	A	NH^{*}	A	A	A	A	A	A	0 / 1	2–1	67%
Italian Open	A	A	A	A	A	A	A	A	A	A	A	A	A	A	A	A	A	A	A	A	A	A	A	0 / 0	0–0	–
Canadian Open	A	A	A	2R	A	1R	1R	2R	A	A	2R	SF	1R	A	QF	A	NH^{*}	A	A	A	A	A	A	0 / 8	8–8	50%
Cincinnati Open	A	A	1R	QF	A	A	A	A	A	A	A	A	A	A	A	1R	A	A	A	1R	A	A	A	0 / 4	2–4	33%
Shanghai Masters	A	A	1R	A	A	A	2R	A	A	A	A	A	A	A	A	2R	not held^{*}			A	A	A	A	0 / 3	2–3	40%
Paris Masters	A	A	A	A	1R	A	A	A	A	A	A	A	1R	A	A	A	A	2R	A	2R	A	A	A	0 / 4	2–3	40%
Win–loss	0–0	0–0	0–2	3–4	1–2	5–3	2–3	3–3	0–1	0–0	1–2	3–2	0–2	3–2	2–2	4–4	0–0	1–1	0–0	1–1	0–0	0–0	1–1	0 / 36	30–35	46%
Career statistics
Statistic	2004	2005	2006	2007	2008	2009	2010	2011	2012	2013	2014	2015	2016	2017	2018	2019	2020	2021	2022	2023	2024	2025	2026	SR	W–L	Win%
Tournaments	2	1	12	9	5	5	5	4	2	2	4	5	3	2	3	6	1	2	0	3	0	2	1	Career total: 79		
Titles	0	0	0	0	0	0	1	0	0	0	0	0	0	0	0	0	0	0	0	0	0	0	0	Career total: 1		
Finals	0	0	0	1	0	0	1	0	0	0	0	0	0	0	0	0	0	1	0	0	0	0	0	Career total: 3		
Overall win–loss	1–2	1–1	3–11	8–9	2–5	6–5	7–5	3–5	0–2	2–1	1–3	7–5	1–4	3–2	2–4	6–7	2–1	6–4	1–0	1–4	1–0	2–2	1–1	1 / 79	67–83	45%
Win %	33%	50%	21%	47%	29%	55%	58%	38%	0%	67%	25%	58%	20%	60%	33%	46%	67%	60%	100%	20%	100%	50%	50%	Career total: 45%		
Year-end ranking	381	688	300	143	579	114	163	240	542	572	573	125	–	234	268	139	158	255	–	–	–	501	575			

^{*} not held due to COVID-19 pandemic.

== Grand Slam tournament Finals ==
Djokovic holds the men's all-time record of 24 major singles titles, and he is the only man to achieve a triple Career Grand Slam by winning each of the four majors at least three times. Djokovic is also the only man in tennis history to be the reigning champion of all four majors at once across three different surfaces, though not in the same year. He is the record holder for the most major finals played (38) and the only player to reach at least 7 finals at each of the 4 majors.

=== Grand Slam tournaments finals: 38 (24 titles, 14 runner-ups) ===
Result	Year	Tournament	Surface	Opponent	Score
Loss	2007	US Open	Hard	(Switzerland) Roger Federer	6–7^{(4–7)}, 6–7^{(2–7)}, 4–6
Win	2008	Australian Open	Hard	(France) Jo-Wilfried Tsonga	4–6, 6–4, 6–3, 7–6^{(7–2)}
Loss	2010	US Open	Hard	(Spain) Rafael Nadal	4–6, 7–5, 4–6, 2–6
Win	2011	Australian Open (2)	Hard	(United Kingdom) Andy Murray	6–4, 6–2, 6–3
Win	2011	Wimbledon	Grass	(Spain) Rafael Nadal	6–4, 6–1, 1–6, 6–3
Win	2011	US Open	Hard	(Spain) Rafael Nadal	6–2, 6–4, 6–7^{(3–7)}, 6–1
Win	2012	Australian Open (3)	Hard	(Spain) Rafael Nadal	5–7, 6–4, 6–2, 6–7^{(5–7)}, 7–5
Loss	2012	French Open	Clay	(Spain) Rafael Nadal	4–6, 3–6, 6–2, 5–7
Loss	2012	US Open	Hard	(United Kingdom) Andy Murray	6–7^{(10–12)}, 5–7, 6–2, 6–3, 2–6
Win	2013	Australian Open (4)	Hard	(United Kingdom) Andy Murray	6–7^{(2–7)}, 7–6^{(7–3)}, 6–3, 6–2
Loss	2013	Wimbledon	Grass	(United Kingdom) Andy Murray	4–6, 5–7, 4–6
Loss	2013	US Open	Hard	(Spain) Rafael Nadal	2–6, 6–3, 4–6, 1–6
Loss	2014	French Open	Clay	(Spain) Rafael Nadal	6–3, 5–7, 2–6, 4–6
Win	2014	Wimbledon (2)	Grass	(Switzerland) Roger Federer	6–7^{(7–9)}, 6–4, 7–6^{(7–4)}, 5–7, 6–4
Win	2015	Australian Open (5)	Hard	(United Kingdom) Andy Murray	7–6^{(7–5)}, 6–7^{(4–7)}, 6–3, 6–0
Loss	2015	French Open	Clay	(Switzerland) Stan Wawrinka	6–4, 4–6, 3–6, 4–6
Win	2015	Wimbledon (3)	Grass	(Switzerland) Roger Federer	7–6^{(7–1)}, 6–7^{(10–12)}, 6–4, 6–3
Win	2015	US Open (2)	Hard	(Switzerland) Roger Federer	6–4, 5–7, 6–4, 6–4
Win	2016	Australian Open (6)	Hard	(United Kingdom) Andy Murray	6–1, 7–5, 7–6^{(7–3)}
Win	2016	French Open	Clay	(United Kingdom) Andy Murray	3–6, 6–1, 6–2, 6–4
Loss	2016	US Open	Hard	(Switzerland) Stan Wawrinka	7–6^{(7–1)}, 4–6, 5–7, 3–6
Win	2018	Wimbledon (4)	Grass	(South Africa) Kevin Anderson	6–2, 6–2, 7–6^{(7–3)}
Win	2018	US Open (3)	Hard	(Argentina) Juan Martín del Potro	6–3, 7–6^{(7–4)}, 6–3
Win	2019	Australian Open (7)	Hard	(Spain) Rafael Nadal	6–3, 6–2, 6–3
Win	2019	Wimbledon (5)	Grass	(Switzerland) Roger Federer	7–6^{(7–5)}, 1–6, 7–6^{(7–4)}, 4–6, 13–12^{(7–3)}
Win	2020	Australian Open (8)	Hard	(Austria) Dominic Thiem	6–4, 4–6, 2–6, 6–3, 6–4
Loss	2020	French Open	Clay	(Spain) Rafael Nadal	0–6, 2–6, 5–7
Win	2021	Australian Open (9)	Hard	(Russia) Daniil Medvedev	7–5, 6–2, 6–2
Win	2021	French Open (2)	Clay	(Greece) Stefanos Tsitsipas	6–7^{(6–8)}, 2–6, 6–3, 6–2, 6–4
Win	2021	Wimbledon (6)	Grass	(Italy) Matteo Berrettini	6–7^{(4–7)}, 6–4, 6–4, 6–3
Loss	2021	US Open	Hard	(Russia) Daniil Medvedev	4–6, 4–6, 4–6
Win	2022	Wimbledon (7)	Grass	(Australia) Nick Kyrgios	4–6, 6–3, 6–4, 7–6^{(7–3)}
Win	2023	Australian Open (10)	Hard	(Greece) Stefanos Tsitsipas	6–3, 7–6^{(7–4)}, 7–6^{(7–5)}
Win	2023	French Open (3)	Clay	(Norway) Casper Ruud	7–6^{(7–1)}, 6–3, 7–5
Loss	2023	Wimbledon	Grass	(Spain) Carlos Alcaraz	6–1, 6–7^{(6–8)}, 1–6, 6–3, 4–6
Win	2023	US Open (4)	Hard	Daniil Medvedev	6–3, 7–6^{(7–5)}, 6–3
Loss	2024	Wimbledon	Grass	(Spain) Carlos Alcaraz	2–6, 2–6, 6–7^{(4–7)}
Loss	2026	Australian Open	Hard	(Spain) Carlos Alcaraz	6–2, 2–6, 3–6, 5–7

=== Career Grand Slam tournament seedings ===
The tournaments won by Djokovic are in boldface.

- Djokovic has been seeded 1st in record 33 Grand Slam tournaments, with 10 of those being consecutive.
- He had been seeded 1st or 2nd for 26 consecutive grand slams.
- (DNP) Prior 2022 Australian Open Djokovic lost his ability to compete when his visa to enter Australia was cancelled and he would be denied entry to the country due to not meeting exemption criteria to Australia's vaccination requirements.

Legend
seeded No. 1 (**15** / 33)
seeded No. 2 (**3** / 13)
seeded No. 3 (**3** / 13)
seeded No. 4–10 (**2** / 14)
seeded No. 11–32 (**1** / 5)
not seeded (0 / 7)

Longest / total
10	84 ‡
3	84 ‡
6	84 ‡
5	84 ‡
3	84 ‡
7	84 ‡

- ‡ All time Appearances record

Year	Australian Open	French Open	Wimbledon	US Open
2005	not seeded	not seeded	not seeded	not seeded
2006	not seeded	not seeded	not seeded	20th
2007	14th	6th	4th	3rd
2008	**3rd**	3rd	3rd	3rd
2009	3rd	4th	4th	4th
2010	3rd	3rd	3rd	3rd
2011	**3rd**	2nd	**2nd**	**1st**
2012	**1st**	1st	1st	2nd
2013	**1st**	1st	1st	1st
2014	2nd	2nd	**1st**	1st
2015	**1st**	1st	**1st**	**1st**
2016	**1st**	**1st**	1st	1st
2017	2nd	2nd	2nd	did not play
2018	14th	20th	**12th**	**6th**
2019	**1st**	1st	**1st**	1st
2020	**2nd**	1st	tournament cancelled*	1st
2021	**1st**	**1st**	**1st**	1st
2022	1st (DNP)	1st	**1st**	did not play**
2023	**4th**	**3rd**	2nd	**2nd**
2024	1st	1st	2nd	2nd
2025	7th	6th	6th	7th
2026	4th	3rd	7th	4th
2027				

* Due to the COVID-19 pandemic, the 2020 Wimbledon Championships of the tournament was cancelled.
** Failure to meet vaccination requirement for non-US citizens.

== Other significant finals ==
=== Year–end championships ===
Djokovic has won a record seven year-end championships. He also holds a record streak of four titles from 2012 to 2015.

=== Year–end championship finals: 9 (7 titles, 2 runner-ups) ===
Result	Year	Tournament	Surface	Opponent	Score
Win	2008	Tennis Masters Cup	Hard (i)	(Russia) Nikolay Davydenko	6–1, 7–5
Win	2012	ATP World Tour Finals (2)	Hard (i)	(Switzerland) Roger Federer	7–6^{(8–6)}, 7–5
Win	2013	ATP World Tour Finals (3)	Hard (i)	(Spain) Rafael Nadal	6–3, 6–4
Win	2014	ATP World Tour Finals (4)	Hard (i)	(Switzerland) Roger Federer	walkover
Win	2015	ATP World Tour Finals (5)	Hard (i)	(Switzerland) Roger Federer	6–3, 6–4
Loss	2016	ATP World Tour Finals	Hard (i)	(United Kingdom) Andy Murray	3–6, 4–6
Loss	2018	ATP Finals	Hard (i)	(Germany) Alexander Zverev	4–6, 3–6
Win	2022	ATP Finals (6)	Hard (i)	(Norway) Casper Ruud	7–5, 6–3
Win	2023	ATP Finals (7)	Hard (i)	(Italy) Jannik Sinner	6–3, 6–3

=== ATP 1000 tournaments ===
Djokovic has won a record 40 ATP 1000 titles and he is the first player to complete the Career Golden Masters by winning all ATP Masters 1000 tournaments of the tennis calendar, a feat he achieved twice. He also holds the record for most ATP Masters 1000 titles won in a season with six titles in 2015.

Finals by surface
Hard (29–12)
Clay (11–8)

==== Singles: 60 (40 titles, 20 runner-ups) ====
Result	Year	Tournament	Surface	Opponent	Score
Loss	2007	Indian Wells Open	Hard	(Spain) Rafael Nadal	2–6, 5–7
Win	2007	Miami Open	Hard	(Argentina) Guillermo Cañas	6–3, 6–2, 6–4
Win	2007	Canadian Open	Hard	(Switzerland) Roger Federer	7–6^{(7–2)}, 2–6, 7–6^{(7–2)}
Win	2008	Indian Wells Open	Hard	(United States) Mardy Fish	6–2, 5–7, 6–3
Win	2008	Italian Open	Clay	(Switzerland) Stan Wawrinka	4–6, 6–3, 6–3
Loss	2008	Cincinnati Open	Hard	(United Kingdom) Andy Murray	6–7^{(4–7)}, 6–7^{(5–7)}
Loss	2009	Miami Open	Hard	(United Kingdom) Andy Murray	2–6, 5–7
Loss	2009	Monte-Carlo Masters	Clay	(Spain) Rafael Nadal	3–6, 6–2, 1–6
Loss	2009	Italian Open	Clay	(Spain) Rafael Nadal	6–7^{(2–7)}, 2–6
Loss	2009	Cincinnati Open	Hard	(Switzerland) Roger Federer	1–6, 5–7
Win	2009	Paris Masters	Hard (i)	(France) Gaël Monfils	6–2, 5–7, 7–6^{(7–3)}
Win	2011	Indian Wells Open (2)	Hard	(Spain) Rafael Nadal	4–6, 6–3, 6–2
Win	2011	Miami Open (2)	Hard	(Spain) Rafael Nadal	4–6, 6–3, 7–6^{(7–4)}
Win	2011	Madrid Open	Clay	(Spain) Rafael Nadal	7–5, 6–4
Win	2011	Italian Open (2)	Clay	(Spain) Rafael Nadal	6–4, 6–4
Win	2011	Canadian Open (2)	Hard	(United States) Mardy Fish	6–2, 3–6, 6–4
Loss	2011	Cincinnati Open	Hard	(United Kingdom) Andy Murray	4–6, 0–3 Ret.
Win	2012	Miami Open (3)	Hard	(United Kingdom) Andy Murray	6–1, 7–6^{(7–4)}
Loss	2012	Monte-Carlo Masters	Clay	(Spain) Rafael Nadal	3–6, 1–6
Loss	2012	Italian Open	Clay	(Spain) Rafael Nadal	5–7, 3–6
Win	2012	Canadian Open (3)	Hard	(France) Richard Gasquet	6–3, 6–2
Loss	2012	Cincinnati Open	Hard	(Switzerland) Roger Federer	0–6, 6–7^{(7–9)}
Win	2012	Shanghai Masters	Hard	(United Kingdom) Andy Murray	5–7, 7–6^{(13–11)}, 6–3
Win	2013	Monte-Carlo Masters	Clay	(Spain) Rafael Nadal	6–2, 7–6^{(7–1)}
Win	2013	Shanghai Masters (2)	Hard	(Argentina) Juan Martín del Potro	6–1, 3–6, 7–6^{(7–3)}
Win	2013	Paris Masters (2)	Hard (i)	(Spain) David Ferrer	7–5, 7–5
Win	2014	Indian Wells Open (3)	Hard	(Switzerland) Roger Federer	3–6, 6–3, 7–6^{(7–3)}
Win	2014	Miami Open (4)	Hard	(Spain) Rafael Nadal	6–3, 6–3
Win	2014	Italian Open (3)	Clay	(Spain) Rafael Nadal	4–6, 6–3, 6–3
Win	2014	Paris Masters (3)	Hard (i)	(Canada) Milos Raonic	6–2, 6–3
Win	2015	Indian Wells Open (4)	Hard	(Switzerland) Roger Federer	6–3, 6–7^{(5–7)}, 6–2
Win	2015	Miami Open (5)	Hard	(United Kingdom) Andy Murray	7–6^{(7–3)}, 4–6, 6–0
Win	2015	Monte-Carlo Masters (2)	Clay	(Czech Republic) Tomáš Berdych	7–5, 4–6, 6–3
Win	2015	Italian Open (4)	Clay	(Switzerland) Roger Federer	6–4, 6–3
Loss	2015	Canadian Open	Hard	(United Kingdom) Andy Murray	4–6, 6–4, 3–6
Loss	2015	Cincinnati Open	Hard	(Switzerland) Roger Federer	6–7^{(1–7)}, 3–6
Win	2015	Shanghai Masters (3)	Hard	(France) Jo-Wilfried Tsonga	6–2, 6–4
Win	2015	Paris Masters (4)	Hard (i)	(United Kingdom) Andy Murray	6–2, 6–4
Win	2016	Indian Wells Open (5)	Hard	(Canada) Milos Raonic	6–2, 6–0
Win	2016	Miami Open (6)	Hard	(Japan) Kei Nishikori	6–3, 6–3
Win	2016	Madrid Open (2)	Clay	(United Kingdom) Andy Murray	6–2, 3–6, 6–3
Loss	2016	Italian Open	Clay	(United Kingdom) Andy Murray	3–6, 3–6
Win	2016	Canadian Open (4)	Hard	(Japan) Kei Nishikori	6–3, 7–5
Loss	2017	Italian Open	Clay	(Germany) Alexander Zverev	4–6, 3–6
Win	2018	Cincinnati Open	Hard	(Switzerland) Roger Federer	6–4, 6–4
Win	2018	Shanghai Masters (4)	Hard	(Croatia) Borna Ćorić	6–3, 6–4
Loss	2018	Paris Masters	Hard (i)	(Russia) Karen Khachanov	5–7, 4–6
Win	2019	Madrid Open (3)	Clay	(Greece) Stefanos Tsitsipas	6–3, 6–4
Loss	2019	Italian Open	Clay	(Spain) Rafael Nadal	0–6, 6–4, 1–6
Win	2019	Paris Masters (5)	Hard (i)	(Canada) Denis Shapovalov	6–3, 6–4
Win	2020	Cincinnati Open (2)	Hard	(Canada) Milos Raonic	1–6, 6–3, 6–4
Win	2020	Italian Open (5)	Clay	(Argentina) Diego Schwartzman	7–5, 6–3
Loss	2021	Italian Open	Clay	(Spain) Rafael Nadal	5–7, 6–1, 3–6
Win	2021	Paris Masters (6)	Hard (i)	(Russia) Daniil Medvedev	4–6, 6–3, 6–3
Win	2022	Italian Open (6)	Clay	(Greece) Stefanos Tsitsipas	6–0, 7–6^{(7–5)}
Loss	2022	Paris Masters	Hard (i)	(Denmark) Holger Rune	6–3, 3–6, 5–7
Win	2023	Cincinnati Open (3)	Hard	(Spain) Carlos Alcaraz	5–7, 7–6^{(9–7)}, 7–6^{(7–4)}
Win	2023	Paris Masters (7)	Hard (i)	(Bulgaria) Grigor Dimitrov	6–4, 6–3
Loss	2024	Shanghai Masters	Hard	(Italy) Jannik Sinner	6–7^{(4–7)}, 3–6
Loss	2025	Miami Open	Hard	(Czech Republic) Jakub Menšík	6–7^{(4–7)}, 6–7^{(4–7)}

=== Summer Olympics ===
==== Singles: 4 (1 gold medal, 1 bronze medal, 2 fourth places) ====
Result	Year	Tournament	Surface	Opponent	Score
Bronze	2008	Beijing Olympics	Hard	(United States) James Blake	6–3, 7–6^{(7–4)}
4th place	2012	London Olympics	Grass	(Argentina) Juan Martín del Potro	5–7, 4–6
4th place	2021	Tokyo Olympics	Hard	(Spain) Pablo Carreño Busta	4–6, 7–6^{(8–6)}, 3–6
Gold	2024	Paris Olympics	Clay	(Spain) Carlos Alcaraz	7–6^{(7–3)}, 7–6^{(7–2)}

==== Mixed doubles: 1 (1 fourth place) ====
Result	Year	Tournament	Surface	Partner	Opponents	Score
4th place	2021	Tokyo Olympics	Hard	(Serbia) Nina Stojanović	(Australia) Ashleigh Barty (Australia) John Peers	walkover

== ATP Tour career finals ==
=== Singles: 146 (102 titles, 44 runner-ups) ===
Legend Grand Slam (24–14) Olympics (1–0) ATP Finals (7–2) ATP 1000 (40–20) ATP 500 (16–3) ATP 250 (14–5)	Finals by surface Hard (73–24) Clay (21–14) Grass (8–6)	Finals by setting Outdoor (82–38) Indoor (20–6)

(*) signifies the nine tournaments where Djokovic won the title after saving at least one match point

Result	W–L	Date	Tournament	Tier	Surface	Opponent	Score
Win	1–0	Jul 2006	Dutch Open, Netherlands	ATP 250	Clay	(Chile) Nicolás Massú	7–6^{(7–5)}, 6–4
Loss	1–1	Jul 2006	Croatia Open, Croatia	ATP 250	Clay	(Switzerland) Stan Wawrinka	6–6^{(3–1)} ret.
Win	2–1	Oct 2006	Moselle Open, France	ATP 250	Hard (i)	(Austria) Jürgen Melzer	4–6, 6–3, 6–2
Win	3–1	Jan 2007	Australian Hard Court Championships, Australia	ATP 250	Hard	(Australia) Chris Guccione	6–3, 6–7^{(6–8)}, 6–4
Loss	3–2	Mar 2007	Indian Wells Open, US	ATP 1000	Hard	(Spain) Rafael Nadal	2–6, 5–7
Win	4–2	Apr 2007	Miami Open, US	ATP 1000	Hard	(Argentina) Guillermo Cañas	6–3, 6–2, 6–4
Win	5–2	Apr 2007	Portugal Open, Portugal	ATP 250	Clay	(France) Richard Gasquet	7–6^{(9–7)}, 0–6, 6–1
Win	6–2	Aug 2007	Canadian Open, Canada	ATP 1000	Hard	(Switzerland) Roger Federer	7–6^{(7–2)}, 2–6, 7–6^{(7–2)}
Loss	6–3	Sep 2007	US Open, US	Grand Slam	Hard	(Switzerland) Roger Federer	6–7^{(4–7)}, 6–7^{(2–7)}, 4–6
Win	7–3	Oct 2007	Vienna Open, Austria*	ATP 500	Hard (i)	(Switzerland) Stan Wawrinka	6–4, 6–0
Win	8–3	Jan 2008	Australian Open, Australia	Grand Slam	Hard	(France) Jo-Wilfried Tsonga	4–6, 6–4, 6–3, 7–6^{(7–2)}
Win	9–3	Mar 2008	Indian Wells Open, US	ATP 1000	Hard	(United States) Mardy Fish	6–2, 5–7, 6–3
Win	10–3	May 2008	Italian Open, Italy	ATP 1000	Clay	(Switzerland) Stan Wawrinka	4–6, 6–3, 6–3
Loss	10–4	Jun 2008	Queen's Club Championships, UK	ATP 250	Grass	(Spain) Rafael Nadal	6–7^{(6–8)}, 5–7
Loss	10–5	Aug 2008	Cincinnati Open, US	ATP 1000	Hard	(United Kingdom) Andy Murray	6–7^{(4–7)}, 6–7^{(5–7)}
Loss	10–6	Sep 2008	Thailand Open, Thailand	ATP 250	Hard (i)	(France) Jo-Wilfried Tsonga	6–7^{(4–7)}, 4–6
Win	11–6	Nov 2008	ATP Finals, China	ATP Finals	Hard (i)	(Russia) Nikolay Davydenko	6–1, 7–5
Win	12–6	Feb 2009	Dubai Championships, UAE	ATP 500	Hard	(Spain) David Ferrer	7–5, 6–3
Loss	12–7	Apr 2009	Miami Open, US	ATP 1000	Hard	(United Kingdom) Andy Murray	2–6, 5–7
Loss	12–8	Apr 2009	Monte-Carlo Masters, France	ATP 1000	Clay	(Spain) Rafael Nadal	3–6, 6–2, 1–6
Loss	12–9	May 2009	Italian Open, Italy	ATP 1000	Clay	(Spain) Rafael Nadal	6–7^{(2–7)}, 2–6
Win	13–9	May 2009	Serbia Open, Serbia	ATP 250	Clay	(Poland) Łukasz Kubot	6–3, 7–6^{(7–0)}
Loss	13–10	Jun 2009	Halle Open, Germany	ATP 250	Grass	(Germany) Tommy Haas	3–6, 7–6^{(7–4)}, 1–6
Loss	13–11	Aug 2009	Cincinnati Open, US	ATP 1000	Hard	(Switzerland) Roger Federer	1–6, 5–7
Win	14–11	Oct 2009	China Open, China	ATP 500	Hard	(Croatia) Marin Čilić	6–2, 7–6^{(7–4)}
Win	15–11	Nov 2009	Swiss Indoors, Switzerland*	ATP 500	Hard (i)	(Switzerland) Roger Federer	6–4, 4–6, 6–2
Win	16–11	Nov 2009	Paris Masters, France	ATP 1000	Hard (i)	(France) Gaël Monfils	6–2, 5–7, 7–6^{(7–3)}
Win	17–11	Feb 2010	Dubai Championships, UAE (2)	ATP 500	Hard	(Russia) Mikhail Youzhny	7–5, 5–7, 6–3
Loss	17–12	Sep 2010	US Open, US	Grand Slam	Hard	(Spain) Rafael Nadal	4–6, 7–5, 4–6, 2–6
Win	18–12	Oct 2010	China Open, China (2)	ATP 500	Hard	(Spain) David Ferrer	6–2, 6–4
Loss	18–13	Nov 2010	Swiss Indoors, Switzerland	ATP 500	Hard (i)	(Switzerland) Roger Federer	4–6, 6–3, 1–6
Win	19–13	Jan 2011	Australian Open, Australia (2)	Grand Slam	Hard	(United Kingdom) Andy Murray	6–4, 6–2, 6–3
Win	20–13	Feb 2011	Dubai Championships, UAE (3)	ATP 500	Hard	(Switzerland) Roger Federer	6–3, 6–3
Win	21–13	Mar 2011	Indian Wells Open, US (2)	ATP 1000	Hard	(Spain) Rafael Nadal	4–6, 6–3, 6–2
Win	22–13	Apr 2011	Miami Open, US (2)	ATP 1000	Hard	(Spain) Rafael Nadal	4–6, 6–3, 7–6^{(7–4)}
Win	23–13	May 2011	Serbia Open, Serbia (2)	ATP 250	Clay	(Spain) Feliciano López	7–6^{(7–4)}, 6–2
Win	24–13	May 2011	Madrid Open, Spain	ATP 1000	Clay	(Spain) Rafael Nadal	7–5, 6–4
Win	25–13	May 2011	Italian Open, Italy (2)	ATP 1000	Clay	(Spain) Rafael Nadal	6–4, 6–4
Win	26–13	Jul 2011	Wimbledon, UK	Grand Slam	Grass	(Spain) Rafael Nadal	6–4, 6–1, 1–6, 6–3
Win	27–13	Aug 2011	Canadian Open, Canada (2)	ATP 1000	Hard	(United States) Mardy Fish	6–2, 3–6, 6–4
Loss	27–14	Aug 2011	Cincinnati Open, US	ATP 1000	Hard	(United Kingdom) Andy Murray	4–6, 0–3 ret.
Win	28–14	Sep 2011	US Open, US*	Grand Slam	Hard	(Spain) Rafael Nadal	6–2, 6–4, 6–7^{(3–7)}, 6–1
Win	29–14	Jan 2012	Australian Open, Australia (3)	Grand Slam	Hard	(Spain) Rafael Nadal	5–7, 6–4, 6–2, 6–7^{(5–7)}, 7–5
Win	30–14	Apr 2012	Miami Open, US (3)	ATP 1000	Hard	(United Kingdom) Andy Murray	6–1, 7–6^{(7–4)}
Loss	30–15	Apr 2012	Monte-Carlo Masters, France	ATP 1000	Clay	(Spain) Rafael Nadal	3–6, 1–6
Loss	30–16	May 2012	Italian Open, Italy	ATP 1000	Clay	(Spain) Rafael Nadal	5–7, 3–6
Loss	30–17	Jun 2012	French Open, France	Grand Slam	Clay	(Spain) Rafael Nadal	4–6, 3–6, 6–2, 5–7
Win	31–17	Aug 2012	Canadian Open, Canada (3)	ATP 1000	Hard	(France) Richard Gasquet	6–3, 6–2
Loss	31–18	Aug 2012	Cincinnati Open, US	ATP 1000	Hard	(Switzerland) Roger Federer	0–6, 6–7^{(7–9)}
Loss	31–19	Sep 2012	US Open, US	Grand Slam	Hard	(United Kingdom) Andy Murray	6–7^{(10–12)}, 5–7, 6–2, 6–3, 2–6
Win	32–19	Oct 2012	China Open, China (3)	ATP 500	Hard	(France) Jo-Wilfried Tsonga	7–6^{(7–4)}, 6–2
Win	33–19	Oct 2012	Shanghai Masters, China*	ATP 1000	Hard	(United Kingdom) Andy Murray	5–7, 7–6^{(13–11)}, 6–3
Win	34–19	Nov 2012	ATP Finals, UK (2)	ATP Finals	Hard (i)	(Switzerland) Roger Federer	7–6^{(8–6)}, 7–5
Win	35–19	Jan 2013	Australian Open, Australia (4)	Grand Slam	Hard	(United Kingdom) Andy Murray	6–7^{(2–7)}, 7–6^{(7–3)}, 6–3, 6–2
Win	36–19	Mar 2013	Dubai Championships, UAE (4)	ATP 500	Hard	(Czech Republic) Tomáš Berdych	7–5, 6–3
Win	37–19	Apr 2013	Monte-Carlo Masters, France	ATP 1000	Clay	(Spain) Rafael Nadal	6–2, 7–6^{(7–1)}
Loss	37–20	Jul 2013	Wimbledon, UK	Grand Slam	Grass	(United Kingdom) Andy Murray	4–6, 5–7, 4–6
Loss	37–21	Sep 2013	US Open, US	Grand Slam	Hard	(Spain) Rafael Nadal	2–6, 6–3, 4–6, 1–6
Win	38–21	Oct 2013	China Open, China (4)	ATP 500	Hard	(Spain) Rafael Nadal	6–3, 6–4
Win	39–21	Oct 2013	Shanghai Masters, China (2)	ATP 1000	Hard	(Argentina) Juan Martín del Potro	6–1, 3–6, 7–6^{(7–3)}
Win	40–21	Nov 2013	Paris Masters, France (2)	ATP 1000	Hard (i)	(Spain) David Ferrer	7–5, 7–5
Win	41–21	Nov 2013	ATP Finals, UK (3)	ATP Finals	Hard (i)	(Spain) Rafael Nadal	6–3, 6–4
Win	42–21	Mar 2014	Indian Wells Open, US (3)	ATP 1000	Hard	(Switzerland) Roger Federer	3–6, 6–3, 7–6^{(7–3)}
Win	43–21	Mar 2014	Miami Open, US (4)	ATP 1000	Hard	(Spain) Rafael Nadal	6–3, 6–3
Win	44–21	May 2014	Italian Open, Italy (3)	ATP 1000	Clay	(Spain) Rafael Nadal	4–6, 6–3, 6–3
Loss	44–22	Jun 2014	French Open, France	Grand Slam	Clay	(Spain) Rafael Nadal	6–3, 5–7, 2–6, 4–6
Win	45–22	Jul 2014	Wimbledon, UK (2)	Grand Slam	Grass	(Switzerland) Roger Federer	6–7^{(7–9)}, 6–4, 7–6^{(7–4)}, 5–7, 6–4
Win	46–22	Oct 2014	China Open, China (5)	ATP 500	Hard	(Czech Republic) Tomáš Berdych	6–0, 6–2
Win	47–22	Nov 2014	Paris Masters, France (3)	ATP 1000	Hard (i)	(Canada) Milos Raonic	6–2, 6–3
Win	48–22	Nov 2014	ATP Finals, UK (4)	ATP Finals	Hard (i)	(Switzerland) Roger Federer	walkover
Win	49–22	Feb 2015	Australian Open, Australia (5)	Grand Slam	Hard	(United Kingdom) Andy Murray	7–6^{(7–5)}, 6–7^{(4–7)}, 6–3, 6–0
Loss	49–23	Feb 2015	Dubai Championships, UAE	ATP 500	Hard	(Switzerland) Roger Federer	3–6, 5–7
Win	50–23	Mar 2015	Indian Wells Open, US (4)	ATP 1000	Hard	(Switzerland) Roger Federer	6–3, 6–7^{(5–7)}, 6–2
Win	51–23	Apr 2015	Miami Open, US (5)	ATP 1000	Hard	(United Kingdom) Andy Murray	7–6^{(7–3)}, 4–6, 6–0
Win	52–23	Apr 2015	Monte-Carlo Masters, France (2)	ATP 1000	Clay	(Czech Republic) Tomáš Berdych	7–5, 4–6, 6–3
Win	53–23	May 2015	Italian Open, Italy (4)	ATP 1000	Clay	(Switzerland) Roger Federer	6–4, 6–3
Loss	53–24	Jun 2015	French Open, France	Grand Slam	Clay	(Switzerland) Stan Wawrinka	6–4, 4–6, 3–6, 4–6
Win	54–24	Jul 2015	Wimbledon, UK (3)	Grand Slam	Grass	(Switzerland) Roger Federer	7–6^{(7–1)}, 6–7^{(10–12)}, 6–4, 6–3
Loss	54–25	Aug 2015	Canadian Open, Canada	ATP 1000	Hard	(United Kingdom) Andy Murray	4–6, 6–4, 3–6
Loss	54–26	Aug 2015	Cincinnati Open, US	ATP 1000	Hard	(Switzerland) Roger Federer	6–7^{(1–7)}, 3–6
Win	55–26	Sep 2015	US Open, US (2)	Grand Slam	Hard	(Switzerland) Roger Federer	6–4, 5–7, 6–4, 6–4
Win	56–26	Oct 2015	China Open, China (6)	ATP 500	Hard	(Spain) Rafael Nadal	6–2, 6–2
Win	57–26	Oct 2015	Shanghai Masters, China (3)	ATP 1000	Hard	(France) Jo-Wilfried Tsonga	6–2, 6–4
Win	58–26	Nov 2015	Paris Masters, France (4)	ATP 1000	Hard (i)	(United Kingdom) Andy Murray	6–2, 6–4
Win	59–26	Nov 2015	ATP Finals, UK (5)	ATP Finals	Hard (i)	(Switzerland) Roger Federer	6–3, 6–4
Win	60–26	Jan 2016	Qatar Open, Qatar	ATP 250	Hard	(Spain) Rafael Nadal	6–1, 6–2
Win	61–26	Jan 2016	Australian Open, Australia (6)	Grand Slam	Hard	(United Kingdom) Andy Murray	6–1, 7–5, 7–6^{(7–3)}
Win	62–26	Mar 2016	Indian Wells Open, US (5)	ATP 1000	Hard	(Canada) Milos Raonic	6–2, 6–0
Win	63–26	Apr 2016	Miami Open, US (6)	ATP 1000	Hard	(Japan) Kei Nishikori	6–3, 6–3
Win	64–26	May 2016	Madrid Open, Spain (2)	ATP 1000	Clay	(United Kingdom) Andy Murray	6–2, 3–6, 6–3
Loss	64–27	May 2016	Italian Open, Italy	ATP 1000	Clay	(United Kingdom) Andy Murray	3–6, 3–6
Win	65–27	Jun 2016	French Open, France	Grand Slam	Clay	(United Kingdom) Andy Murray	3–6, 6–1, 6–2, 6–4
Win	66–27	Jul 2016	Canadian Open, Canada (4)	ATP 1000	Hard	(Japan) Kei Nishikori	6–3, 7–5
Loss	66–28	Aug 2016	US Open, US	Grand Slam	Hard	(Switzerland) Stan Wawrinka	7–6^{(7–1)}, 4–6, 5–7, 3–6
Loss	66–29	Nov 2016	ATP Finals, UK	ATP Finals	Hard (i)	(United Kingdom) Andy Murray	3–6, 4–6
Win	67–29	Jan 2017	Qatar Open, Qatar (2)*	ATP 250	Hard	(United Kingdom) Andy Murray	6–3, 5–7, 6–4
Loss	67–30	May 2017	Italian Open, Italy	ATP 1000	Clay	(Germany) Alexander Zverev	4–6, 3–6
Win	68–30	Jul 2017	Eastbourne International, UK	ATP 250	Grass	(France) Gaël Monfils	6–3, 6–4
Loss	68–31	Jun 2018	Queen's Club Championships, UK	ATP 500	Grass	(Croatia) Marin Čilić	7–5, 6–7^{(4–7)}, 3–6
Win	69–31	Jul 2018	Wimbledon, UK (4)	Grand Slam	Grass	(South Africa) Kevin Anderson	6–2, 6–2, 7–6^{(7–3)}
Win	70–31	Aug 2018	Cincinnati Open, US	ATP 1000	Hard	(Switzerland) Roger Federer	6–4, 6–4
Win	71–31	Sep 2018	US Open, US (3)	Grand Slam	Hard	(Argentina) Juan Martín del Potro	6–3, 7–6^{(7–4)}, 6–3
Win	72–31	Oct 2018	Shanghai Masters, China (4)	ATP 1000	Hard	(Croatia) Borna Ćorić	6–3, 6–4
Loss	72–32	Nov 2018	Paris Masters, France	ATP 1000	Hard (i)	(Russia) Karen Khachanov	5–7, 4–6
Loss	72–33	Nov 2018	ATP Finals, UK	ATP Finals	Hard (i)	(Germany) Alexander Zverev	4–6, 3–6
Win	73–33	Jan 2019	Australian Open, Australia (7)	Grand Slam	Hard	(Spain) Rafael Nadal	6–3, 6–2, 6–3
Win	74–33	May 2019	Madrid Open, Spain (3)	ATP 1000	Clay	(Greece) Stefanos Tsitsipas	6–3, 6–4
Loss	74–34	May 2019	Italian Open, Italy	ATP 1000	Clay	(Spain) Rafael Nadal	0–6, 6–4, 1–6
Win	75–34	Jul 2019	Wimbledon, UK* (5)	Grand Slam	Grass	(Switzerland) Roger Federer	7–6^{(7–5)}, 1–6, 7–6^{(7–4)}, 4–6, 13–12^{(7–3)}
Win	76–34	Oct 2019	Japan Open, Japan	ATP 500	Hard	(Australia) John Millman	6–3, 6–2
Win	77–34	Nov 2019	Paris Masters, France (5)	ATP 1000	Hard (i)	(Canada) Denis Shapovalov	6–3, 6–4
Win	78–34	Jan 2020	Australian Open, Australia (8)	Grand Slam	Hard	(Austria) Dominic Thiem	6–4, 4–6, 2–6, 6–3, 6–4
Win	79–34	Feb 2020	Dubai Championships, UAE* (5)	ATP 500	Hard	(Greece) Stefanos Tsitsipas	6–3, 6–4
Win	80–34	Aug 2020	Cincinnati Open, US (2)	ATP 1000	Hard	(Canada) Milos Raonic	1–6, 6–3, 6–4
Win	81–34	Sep 2020	Italian Open, Italy (5)	ATP 1000	Clay	(Argentina) Diego Schwartzman	7–5, 6–3
Loss	81–35	Oct 2020	French Open, France	Grand Slam	Clay	(Spain) Rafael Nadal	0–6, 2–6, 5–7
Win	82–35	Feb 2021	Australian Open, Australia (9)	Grand Slam	Hard	(Russia) Daniil Medvedev	7–5, 6–2, 6–2
Loss	82–36	May 2021	Italian Open, Italy	ATP 1000	Clay	(Spain) Rafael Nadal	5–7, 6–1, 3–6
Win	83–36	May 2021	Belgrade Open, Serbia	ATP 250	Clay	(Slovakia) Alex Molčan	6–4, 6–3
Win	84–36	Jun 2021	French Open, France (2)	Grand Slam	Clay	(Greece) Stefanos Tsitsipas	6–7^{(6–8)}, 2–6, 6–3, 6–2, 6–4
Win	85–36	Jul 2021	Wimbledon, UK (6)	Grand Slam	Grass	(Italy) Matteo Berrettini	6–7^{(4–7)}, 6–4, 6–4, 6–3
Loss	85–37	Sep 2021	US Open, US	Grand Slam	Hard	(Russia) Daniil Medvedev	4–6, 4–6, 4–6
Win	86–37	Nov 2021	Paris Masters, France (6)	ATP 1000	Hard (i)	(Russia) Daniil Medvedev	4–6, 6–3, 6–3
Loss	86–38	Apr 2022	Serbia Open, Serbia	ATP 250	Clay	Andrey Rublev	2–6, 7–6^{(7–4)}, 0–6
Win	87–38	May 2022	Italian Open, Italy (6)	ATP 1000	Clay	(Greece) Stefanos Tsitsipas	6–0, 7–6^{(7–5)}
Win	88–38	Jul 2022	Wimbledon, UK (7)	Grand Slam	Grass	(Australia) Nick Kyrgios	4–6, 6–3, 6–4, 7–6^{(7–3)}
Win	89–38	Oct 2022	Tel Aviv Open, Israel	ATP 250	Hard (i)	(Croatia) Marin Čilić	6–3, 6–4
Win	90–38	Oct 2022	Astana Open, Kazakhstan	ATP 500	Hard (i)	(Greece) Stefanos Tsitsipas	6–3, 6–4
Loss	90–39	Nov 2022	Paris Masters, France	ATP 1000	Hard (i)	(Denmark) Holger Rune	6–3, 3–6, 5–7
Win	91–39	Nov 2022	ATP Finals, Italy (6)	ATP Finals	Hard (i)	(Norway) Casper Ruud	7–5, 6–3
Win	92–39	Jan 2023	Adelaide International, Australia*	ATP 250	Hard	(United States) Sebastian Korda	6–7^{(8–10)}, 7–6^{(7–3)}, 6–4
Win	93–39	Jan 2023	Australian Open, Australia (10)	Grand Slam	Hard	(Greece) Stefanos Tsitsipas	6–3, 7–6^{(7–4)}, 7–6^{(7–5)}
Win	94–39	Jun 2023	French Open, France (3)	Grand Slam	Clay	(Norway) Casper Ruud	7–6^{(7–1)}, 6–3, 7–5
Loss	94–40	Jul 2023	Wimbledon, UK	Grand Slam	Grass	(Spain) Carlos Alcaraz	6–1, 6–7^{(6–8)}, 1–6, 6–3, 4–6
Win	95–40	Aug 2023	Cincinnati Open, US* (3)	ATP 1000	Hard	(Spain) Carlos Alcaraz	5–7, 7–6^{(9–7)}, 7–6^{(7–4)}
Win	96–40	Sep 2023	US Open, US (4)	Grand Slam	Hard	Daniil Medvedev	6–3, 7–6^{(7–5)}, 6–3
Win	97–40	Nov 2023	Paris Masters, France (7)	ATP 1000	Hard (i)	(Bulgaria) Grigor Dimitrov	6–4, 6–3
Win	98–40	Nov 2023	ATP Finals, Italy (7)	ATP Finals	Hard (i)	(Italy) Jannik Sinner	6–3, 6–3
Loss	98–41	Jul 2024	Wimbledon, UK	Grand Slam	Grass	(Spain) Carlos Alcaraz	2–6, 2–6, 6–7^{(4–7)}
Win	99–41	Aug 2024	Olympic Games, France	Olympics	Clay	(Spain) Carlos Alcaraz	7–6^{(7–3)}, 7–6^{(7–2)}
Loss	99–42	Oct 2024	Shanghai Masters, China	ATP 1000	Hard	(Italy) Jannik Sinner	6–7^{(4–7)}, 3–6
Loss	99–43	Mar 2025	Miami Open, US	ATP 1000	Hard	(Czech Republic) Jakub Menšík	6–7^{(4–7)}, 6–7^{(4–7)}
Win	100–43	May 2025	Geneva Open, Switzerland	ATP 250	Clay	(Poland) Hubert Hurkacz	5–7, 7–6^{(7–2)}, 7–6^{(7–2)}
Win	101–43	Nov 2025	Hellenic Championship, Greece	ATP 250	Hard (i)	(Italy) Lorenzo Musetti	4–6, 6–3, 7–5
Loss	101–44	Jan 2026	Australian Open, Australia	Grand Slam	Hard	(Spain) Carlos Alcaraz	6–2, 2–6, 3–6, 5–7
Win	102–44	Oct 2026	China Open, China (7)	ATP 500	Hard	(Australia) Alex de Minaur	7–6^{(7–3)}, 0–1 ret.

=== Doubles: 3 (1 title, 2 runner-ups) ===
Legend Grand Slam (–) ATP Finals (–) ATP 1000 (–) ATP 500 (–) ATP 250 (1–2)	Finals by surface Hard (0–1) Clay (–) Grass (1–1) Carpet (–)	Finals by setting Outdoor (1–2) Indoor (–)

Result	W–L	Date	Tournament	Tier	Surface	Partner	Opponents	Score
Loss	0–1	Jan 2007	Adelaide International, Australia	ATP 250	Hard	(Czech Republic) Radek Štěpánek	(South Africa) Wesley Moodie (Australia) Todd Perry	4–6, 6–3, [13–15]
Win	1–1	Jun 2010	Queen's Club Championships, UK	ATP 250	Grass	(Israel) Jonathan Erlich	(Slovakia) Karol Beck (Czech Republic) David Škoch	6–7^{(6–8)}, 6–2, [10–3]
Loss	1–2	Jun 2021	Mallorca Open, Spain	ATP 250	Grass	(Spain) Carlos Gómez-Herrera	(Italy) Simone Bolelli (Argentina) Máximo González	walkover

== ATP Challenger & ITF Futures finals ==
=== Singles: 6 (6 titles) ===
Legend ATP Challenger Tour (3–0) ITF Futures (3–0)	Finals by surface Hard (0–0) Clay (5–0) Carpet (1–0)

Result	W–L	Date	Tournament	Tier	Surface	Opponent	Score
Win	1–0	May 2004	Budapest Challenger, Hungary	Challenger	Clay	(Italy) Daniele Bracciali	6–1, 6–2
Win	2–0	Nov 2004	Lambertz Open, Germany	Challenger	Carpet (i)	(Germany) Lars Burgsmüller	6–4, 3–6, 6–4
Win	3–0	May 2005	Sanremo Tennis Cup, Italy	Challenger	Clay	(Italy) Francesco Aldi	6–3, 7–6^{(7–4)}
Win	1–0	Jun 2003	F3 Belgrade, Serbia and Montenegro	Futures	Clay	(Spain) César Ferrer-Victoria	6–4, 7–5
Win	2–0	May 2004	F1 Szolnok, Hungary	Futures	Clay	(Slovenia) Marko Tkalec	6–4, 6–2
Win	3–0	Aug 2004	F5 Čačak, Serbia and Montenegro	Futures	Clay	(Italy) Flavio Cipolla	6–4, 6–3

=== Doubles: 1 (title) ===
Legend ITF Futures (1–0)

Result	Date	Tournament	Tier	Surface	Partner	Opponents	Score
Win	Aug 2004	F5 Čačak, Serbia and Montenegro	Futures	Clay	(Serbia and Montenegro) Dejan Petrović	(Italy) Flavio Cipolla (Spain) Alberto Soriano-Maldonado	7–6^{(7–4)}, 6–2

== ATP rankings ==
Djokovic has spent the most weeks as ATP world No. 1, a record total of 428. He had been ranked No. 1 in a record 13 different years and finished as year-end No. 1 a record eight times. Djokovic also holds the record for most points accumulated at the top of the rankings (16,950).

=== Timeline ===
Year	2003	2004	2005	2006	2007	2008	2009	2010	2011	2012	2013	2014	2015	2016	2017	2018	2019	2020	2021	2022	2023	2024	2025	2026
High	660	184	75	16	3	3	3	2	1	1	1	1	1	1	2	1	1	1	1	1	1	1	4	3
Low	774	681	188	81	16	3	4	3	3	2	2	2	1	2	12	22	2	2	1	8	5	7	7	12
End	679	186	78	16	3	3	3	3	1	1	2	1	1	2	12	1	2	1	1	5	1	7	4	

==== Weeks statistics ====
Weeks at	Total weeks
No. 1	428 (record)
Top 2	599 (record)
Top 3	764 (record)
Top 4	829 (record)
Top 5	873 (record)
Top 6	906 (record)
Top 7	946 (record)
Top 8	954 (record)
Top 9	954
Top 10	961
Top 20	1021*
Top 30	1039*
Top 50	1045*
Top 100	1094*
Top 1000	1197*

*as of 16 November 2026.

=== ATP world No. 1 ===
==== Weeks at No. 1 by span ====
Stint	Start date	End date	Weeks	Total
1	4 July 2011	8 July 2012	53	53
2	5 November 2012	6 October 2013	48	101
3	7 July 2014	6 November 2016	122	223
4	5 November 2018	3 November 2019	52	275
5	3 February 2020	22 March 2020	7	282
Ranking frozen	23 March 2020	23 August 2020	22	22
5	24 August 2020	27 February 2022	79	361
6	21 March 2022	12 June 2022	12	373
7	30 January 2023	19 March 2023	7	380
8	3 April 2023	21 May 2023	7	387
9	12 June 2023	25 June 2023	2	389
10	11 September 2023	9 June 2024	39	428

==== World No. 1 ranking records ====
Category	No. 1	Years
Weeks at No. 1	428	First (2011) – Last (2024)
Different years ranked No. 1	13	2011–16, 2018–24
Highest rankings points	16,950	2016 (June)
Year-end No. 1	8	2011, 2012, 2014, 2015, 2018, 2020, 2021, 2023
ITF World Champion	8	2011, 2012, 2013, 2014, 2015, 2018, 2021, 2023

==== Span holding the No. 1 ranking ====
Time span	First held	Last held
12 years, 341 days	4 July 2011	9 June 2024

==== Age at first and last dates at No. 1 ====
Birthdate	Age at first week	Age at last week
22 May 1987 (age 39)	24 years, 43 days	37 years, 18 days

==== Weeks at No. 1 by decade ====
===== 2010s =====
275

===== 2020s =====
153

== Top-10 wins ==
Djokovic has the record of most wins over top-10 ranked players (at the time they played) in the Open Era, a total 269 victories. He also holds a season-record of 31 victories over top-10 players which he set in 2015.

In 2011, in a seven-tournament span, Djokovic had the most dominant record versus a world No. 1 (5–0), defeating then No. 1, Rafael Nadal in the finals of five prestigious events; Indian Wells Open, Miami Open, Madrid Open, Italian Open, and Wimbledon before overtaking him as No. 1.

Season	2005	2006	2007	2008	2009	2010	2011	2012	2013	2014	2015	2016	2017	2018	2019	2020	2021	2022	2023	2024	2025	2026	Total
Wins	1	2	6	11	15	4	21	24	24	19	31	21	2	15	9	10	14	11	17	2	4	6	269

#	Player	Rk	Event	Surface	Rd	Score	Rk
2005
1.	(Argentina) Mariano Puerta	9	Paris Masters, France	Carpet (i)	2R	6–3, 7–6^{(11–9)}	85
2006
2.	(Chile) Fernando González	9	French Open, France	Clay	2R	6–4, 6–1, 3–6, 4–6, 6–1	63
3.	(Spain) Tommy Robredo	8	Wimbledon, UK	Grass	2R	7–6^{(7–5)}, 6–2, 6–4	39
2007
4.	(Spain) Tommy Robredo	8	Rotterdam Open, Netherlands	Hard (i)	QF	4–6, 6–4, 7–5	14
5.	(Spain) Rafael Nadal	2	Miami Open, US	Hard	QF	6–3, 6–4	10
6.	(Spain) Tommy Robredo	7	Estoril Open, Portugal	Clay	SF	7–5, 6–1	5
7.	(United States) Andy Roddick	3	Canadian Open, Canada	Hard	QF	7–6^{(7–4)}, 6–4	4
8.	(Spain) Rafael Nadal	2	Canadian Open, Canada	Hard	SF	7–5, 6–3	4
9.	(Switzerland) Roger Federer	1	Canadian Open, Canada	Hard	F	7–6^{(7–2)}, 2–6, 7–6^{(7–2)}	4
2008
10.	(Spain) David Ferrer	5	Australian Open, Australia	Hard	QF	6–0, 6–3, 7–5	3
11.	(Switzerland) Roger Federer	1	Australian Open, Australia	Hard	SF	7–5, 6–3, 7–6^{(7–5)}	3
12.	(Spain) Rafael Nadal	2	Indian Wells Open, US	Hard	SF	6–3, 6–2	3
13.	(Argentina) David Nalbandian	8	Queen's Club Championships, UK	Grass	SF	6–1, 6–0	3
14.	(Spain) Rafael Nadal	2	Cincinnati Open, US	Hard	SF	6–1, 7–5	3
15.	(United States) James Blake	7	Beijing Olympics, China	Hard	BM	6–3, 7–6^{(7–4)}	3
16.	(United States) Andy Roddick	8	US Open, US	Hard	QF	6–2, 6–3, 3–6, 7–6^{(7–5)}	3
17.	(Argentina) Juan Martín del Potro	8	Tennis Masters Cup, China	Hard (i)	RR	7–5, 6–3	3
18.	(Russia) Nikolay Davydenko	5	Tennis Masters Cup, China	Hard (i)	RR	7–6^{(7–3)}, 0–6, 7–5	3
19.	(France) Gilles Simon	9	Tennis Masters Cup, China	Hard (i)	SF	4–6, 6–3, 7–5	3
20.	(Russia) Nikolay Davydenko	5	Tennis Masters Cup, China	Hard (i)	F	6–1, 7–5	3
2009
21.	(France) Gilles Simon	8	Dubai Championships, UAE	Hard	SF	3–6, 7–5, 7–5	3
22.	(Switzerland) Roger Federer	2	Miami Open, US	Hard	SF	3–6, 6–2, 6–3	3
23.	(Spain) Fernando Verdasco	7	Monte-Carlo Masters, France	Clay	QF	6–2, 4–6, 6–3	3
24.	(Argentina) Juan Martín del Potro	5	Italian Open, Italy	Clay	QF	6–3, 6–4	3
25.	(Switzerland) Roger Federer	2	Italian Open, Italy	Clay	SF	4–6, 6–3, 6–3	3
26.	(France) Gilles Simon	9	Cincinnati Open, US	Hard	QF	6–4, 7–5	4
27.	(Spain) Rafael Nadal	2	Cincinnati Open, US	Hard	SF	6–1, 6–4	4
28.	(Spain) Fernando Verdasco	10	US Open, US	Hard	QF	7–6^{(7–2)}, 1–6, 7–5, 6–2	4
29.	(Spain) Fernando Verdasco	9	China Open, China	Hard	QF	6–3, 1–6, 6–1	4
30.	(France) Gilles Simon	10	Shanghai Masters, China	Hard	QF	6–3, 2–6, 6–2	4
31.	(Switzerland) Roger Federer	1	Swiss Indoors, Switzerland	Hard (i)	F	6–4, 4–6, 6–2	3
32.	(Sweden) Robin Söderling	10	Paris Masters, France	Hard (i)	QF	6–4, 1–6, 6–3	3
33.	(Spain) Rafael Nadal	2	Paris Masters, France	Hard (i)	SF	6–2, 6–3	3
34.	(Russia) Nikolay Davydenko	7	ATP Finals, UK	Hard (i)	RR	3–6, 6–4, 7–5	3
35.	(Spain) Rafael Nadal	2	ATP Finals, UK	Hard (i)	RR	7–6^{(7–5)}, 6–3	3
2010
36.	(Switzerland) Roger Federer	2	US Open, US	Hard	SF	5–7, 6–1, 5–7, 6–2, 7–5	3
37.	(Czech Republic) Tomáš Berdych	7	Davis Cup, Serbia	Hard (i)	RR	4–6, 6–3, 6–2, 6–4	2
38.	(Czech Republic) Tomáš Berdych	6	ATP Finals, UK	Hard (i)	RR	6–3, 6–3	3
39.	(United States) Andy Roddick	8	ATP Finals, UK	Hard (i)	RR	6–2, 6–3	3
2011
40.	(Czech Republic) Tomáš Berdych	6	Australian Open, Australia	Hard	QF	6–1, 7–6^{(7–5)}, 6–1	3
41.	(Switzerland) Roger Federer	2	Australian Open, Australia	Hard	SF	7–6^{(7–3)}, 7–5, 6–4	3
42.	(United Kingdom) Andy Murray	5	Australian Open, Australia	Hard	F	6–4, 6–2, 6–3	3
43.	(Czech Republic) Tomáš Berdych	7	Dubai Championships, UAE	Hard	SF	6–7^{(5–7)}, 6–2, 4–2, ret.	3
44.	(Switzerland) Roger Federer	2	Dubai Championships, UAE	Hard	F	6–3, 6–3	3
45.	(Switzerland) Roger Federer	2	Indian Wells Open, US	Hard	SF	6–3, 3–6, 6–2	3
46.	(Spain) Rafael Nadal	1	Indian Wells Open, US	Hard	F	4–6, 6–3, 6–2	3
47.	(Spain) Rafael Nadal	1	Miami Open, US	Hard	F	4–6, 6–3, 7–6^{(7–4)}	2
48.	(Spain) David Ferrer	6	Madrid Open, Spain	Clay	QF	6–4, 4–6, 6–3	2
49.	(Spain) Rafael Nadal	1	Madrid Open, Spain	Clay	F	7–5, 6–4	2
50.	(Sweden) Robin Söderling	5	Italian Open, Italy	Clay	QF	6–3, 6–0	2
51.	(United Kingdom) Andy Murray	4	Italian Open, Italy	Clay	SF	6–1, 3–6, 7–6^{(7–2)}	2
52.	(Spain) Rafael Nadal	1	Italian Open, Italy	Clay	F	6–4, 6–4	2
53.	(Spain) Rafael Nadal	1	Wimbledon, UK	Grass	F	6–4, 6–1, 1–6, 6–3	2
54.	(France) Gaël Monfils	7	Canadian Open, Canada	Hard	QF	6–2, 6–1	1
55.	(United States) Mardy Fish	8	Canadian Open, Canada	Hard	F	6–2, 3–6, 6–4	1
56.	(France) Gaël Monfils	8	Cincinnati Open, US	Hard	QF	3–6, 6–4, 6–3	1
57.	(Czech Republic) Tomáš Berdych	9	Cincinnati Open, US	Hard	SF	7–5, ret.	1
58.	(Switzerland) Roger Federer	3	US Open, US	Hard	SF	6–7^{(7–9)}, 4–6, 6–3, 6–2, 7–5	1
59.	(Spain) Rafael Nadal	2	US Open, US	Hard	F	6–2, 6–4, 6–7^{(3–7)}, 6–1	1
60.	(Czech Republic) Tomáš Berdych	7	ATP Finals, UK	Hard (i)	RR	3–6, 6–3, 7–6^{(7–3)}	1
2012
61.	(Spain) David Ferrer	5	Australian Open, Australia	Hard	QF	6–4, 7–6^{(7–4)}, 6–1	1
62.	(United Kingdom) Andy Murray	4	Australian Open, Australia	Hard	SF	6–3, 3–6, 6–7^{(4–7)}, 6–1, 7–5	1
63.	(Spain) Rafael Nadal	2	Australian Open, Australia	Hard	F	5–7, 6–4, 6–2, 6–7^{(5–7)}, 7–5	1
64.	(Serbia) Janko Tipsarević	9	Dubai Championships, UAE	Hard	QF	6–1, 7–6^{(8–6)}	1
65.	(Spain) David Ferrer	5	Miami Open, US	Hard	QF	6–2, 7–6^{(7–1)}	1
66.	(United Kingdom) Andy Murray	4	Miami Open, US	Hard	F	6–1, 7–6^{(7–4)}	1
67.	(Czech Republic) Tomáš Berdych	7	Monte-Carlo Masters, France	Clay	SF	4–6, 6–3, 6–2	1
68.	(France) Jo-Wilfried Tsonga	5	Italian Open, Italy	Clay	QF	7–5, 6–1	1
69.	(Switzerland) Roger Federer	2	Italian Open, Italy	Clay	SF	6–2, 7–6^{(7–4)}	1
70.	(France) Jo-Wilfried Tsonga	5	French Open, France	Clay	QF	6–1, 5–7, 5–7, 7–6^{(8–6)} 6–1	1
71.	(Switzerland) Roger Federer	3	French Open, France	Clay	SF	6–4, 7–5, 6–3	1
72.	(France) Jo-Wilfried Tsonga	6	London Olympics, UK	Grass	QF	6–1, 7–5	2
73.	(Serbia) Janko Tipsarević	9	Canadian Open, Canada	Hard	SF	6–4, 6–1	2
74.	(Argentina) Juan Martín del Potro	9	Cincinnati Open, US	Hard	SF	6–3, 6–2	2
75.	(Argentina) Juan Martín del Potro	8	US Open, US	Hard	QF	6–2, 7–6^{(7–3)}, 6–4	2
76.	(Spain) David Ferrer	5	US Open, US	Hard	SF	2–6, 6–1, 6–4, 6–2	2
77.	(France) Jo-Wilfried Tsonga	7	China Open, China	Hard	F	7–6^{(10–8)}, 6–4	2
78.	(Czech Republic) Tomáš Berdych	7	Shanghai Masters, China	Hard	SF	6–3, 6–4	2
79.	(United Kingdom) Andy Murray	3	Shanghai Masters, China	Hard	F	5–7, 7–6^{(13–11)}, 6–3	2
80.	(France) Jo-Wilfried Tsonga	8	ATP Finals, UK	Hard (i)	RR	7–6^{(7–4)}, 6–3	1
81.	(United Kingdom) Andy Murray	3	ATP Finals, UK	Hard (i)	RR	4–6, 6–3, 7–5	1
82.	(Czech Republic) Tomáš Berdych	6	ATP Finals, UK	Hard (i)	RR	6–2, 7–6^{(8–6)}	1
83.	(Argentina) Juan Martín del Potro	7	ATP Finals, UK	Hard (i)	SF	4–6, 6–3, 6–2	1
84.	(Switzerland) Roger Federer	2	ATP Finals, UK	Hard (i)	F	7–6^{(8–6)}, 7–5	1
2013
85.	(Czech Republic) Tomáš Berdych	6	Australian Open, Australia	Hard	QF	6–1, 4–6, 6–1, 6–4	1
86.	(Spain) David Ferrer	5	Australian Open, Australia	Hard	SF	6–2, 6–2, 6–1	1
87.	(United Kingdom) Andy Murray	3	Australian Open, Australia	Hard	F	6–7^{(2–7)}, 7–6^{(7–3)}, 6–3, 6–2	1
88.	(Argentina) Juan Martín del Potro	7	Dubai Championships, UAE	Hard	SF	6–3, 7–6^{(7–4)}	1
89.	(Czech Republic) Tomáš Berdych	6	Dubai Championships, UAE	Hard	F	7–5, 6–3	1
90.	(France) Jo-Wilfried Tsonga	8	Indian Wells Open, US	Hard	QF	6–3, 6–1	1
91.	(Spain) Rafael Nadal	5	Monte-Carlo Masters, France	Clay	F	6–2, 7–6^{(7–1)}	1
92.	(Czech Republic) Tomáš Berdych	6	Wimbledon, UK	Grass	QF	7–6^{(7–5)}, 6–4, 6–3	1
93.	(Argentina) Juan Martín del Potro	8	Wimbledon, UK	Grass	SF	7–5, 4–6, 7–6^{(7–2)}, 6–7^{(6–8)}, 6–3	1
94.	(France) Richard Gasquet	10	Canadian Open, Canada	Hard	QF	6–1, 6–2	1
95.	(Switzerland) Stan Wawrinka	10	US Open, US	Hard	SF	2–6, 7–6^{(7–4)}, 3–6, 6–3, 6–4	1
96.	(France) Richard Gasquet	10	China Open, China	Hard	SF	6–4, 6–2	1
97.	(Spain) Rafael Nadal	2	China Open, China	Hard	F	6–3, 6–4	1
98.	(France) Jo-Wilfried Tsonga	9	Shanghai Masters, China	Hard	SF	6–2, 7–5	2
99.	(Argentina) Juan Martín del Potro	5	Shanghai Masters, China	Hard	F	6–1, 3–6, 7–6^{(7–3)}	2
100.	(Switzerland) Stan Wawrinka	8	Paris Masters, France	Hard (i)	QF	6–1, 6–4	2
101.	(Switzerland) Roger Federer	6	Paris Masters, France	Hard (i)	SF	4–6, 6–3, 6–2	2
102.	(Spain) David Ferrer	3	Paris Masters, France	Hard (i)	F	7–5, 7–5	2
103.	(Switzerland) Roger Federer	7	ATP Finals, UK	Hard (i)	RR	6–4, 6–7^{(2–7)}, 6–2	2
104.	(Argentina) Juan Martín del Potro	5	ATP Finals, UK	Hard (i)	RR	6–3, 3–6, 6–3	2
105.	(France) Richard Gasquet	9	ATP Finals, UK	Hard (i)	RR	7–6^{(7–5)}, 4–6, 6–3	2
106.	(Switzerland) Stan Wawrinka	8	ATP Finals, UK	Hard (i)	SF	6–3, 6–3	2
107.	(Spain) Rafael Nadal	1	ATP Finals, UK	Hard (i)	F	6–3, 6–4	2
108.	(Czech Republic) Tomáš Berdych	7	Davis Cup, Serbia	Hard (i)	RR	6–4, 7–6^{(7–5)}, 6–2	2
2014
109.	(Switzerland) Roger Federer	8	Indian Wells Open, US	Hard	F	3–6, 6–3, 7–6^{(7–3)}	2
110.	(United Kingdom) Andy Murray	6	Miami Open, US	Hard	QF	7–5, 6–3	2
111.	(Spain) Rafael Nadal	1	Miami Open, US	Hard	F	6–3, 6–3	2
112.	(Spain) David Ferrer	5	Italian Open, Italy	Clay	QF	7–5, 4–6, 6–3	2
113.	(Canada) Milos Raonic	10	Italian Open, Italy	Clay	SF	6–7^{(5–7)},7–6^{(7–4)}, 6–3	2
114.	(Spain) Rafael Nadal	1	Italian Open, Italy	Clay	F	4–6, 6–3, 6–3	2
115.	(Canada) Milos Raonic	9	French Open, France	Clay	QF	7–5, 7–6^{(7–5)}, 6–4	2
116.	(Switzerland) Roger Federer	4	Wimbledon, United Kingdom	Grass	F	6–7^{(7–9)}, 6–4, 7–6^{(7–4)}, 5–7, 6–4	2
117.	(United Kingdom) Andy Murray	9	US Open, US	Hard	QF	7–6^{(7–1)}, 6–7^{(1–7)}, 6–2, 6–4	1
118.	(Bulgaria) Grigor Dimitrov	10	China Open, China	Hard	QF	6–2, 6–4	1
119.	(Czech Republic) Tomáš Berdych	6	China Open, China	Hard	F	6–0, 6–2	1
120.	(Spain) David Ferrer	5	Shanghai Masters, China	Hard	QF	6–4, 6–2	1
121.	(United Kingdom) Andy Murray	8	Paris Masters, France	Hard (i)	QF	7–5, 6–2	1
122.	(Japan) Kei Nishikori	7	Paris Masters, France	Hard (i)	SF	6–2, 6–3	1
123.	(Canada) Milos Raonic	10	Paris Masters, France	Hard (i)	F	6–2, 6–3	1
124.	(Croatia) Marin Čilić	9	ATP Finals, UK	Hard (i)	RR	6–1, 6–1	1
125.	(Switzerland) Stan Wawrinka	4	ATP Finals, UK	Hard (i)	RR	6–3, 6–0	1
126.	(Czech Republic) Tomáš Berdych	7	ATP Finals, UK	Hard (i)	RR	6–2, 6–2	1
127.	(Japan) Kei Nishikori	5	ATP Finals, UK	Hard (i)	SF	6–1, 3–6, 6–0	1
2015
128.	(Canada) Milos Raonic	8	Australian Open, Australia	Hard	QF	7–6^{(7–5)}, 6–4, 6–2	1
129.	(Switzerland) Stan Wawrinka	4	Australian Open, Australia	Hard	SF	7–6^{(7–1)}, 3–6, 6–4, 4–6, 6–0	1
130.	(United Kingdom) Andy Murray	6	Australian Open, Australia	Hard	F	7–6^{(7–5)}, 6–7^{(4–7)}, 6–3, 6–0	1
131.	(Czech Republic) Tomáš Berdych	8	Dubai Championships, UAE	Hard	SF	6–0, 5–7, 6–4	1
132.	(United Kingdom) Andy Murray	4	Indian Wells Open, US	Hard	SF	6–2, 6–3	1
133.	(Switzerland) Roger Federer	2	Indian Wells Open, US	Hard	F	6–3, 6–7^{(5–7)}, 6–2	1
134.	(Spain) David Ferrer	7	Miami Open, US	Hard	QF	7–5, 7–5	1
135.	(United Kingdom) Andy Murray	4	Miami Open, US	Hard	F	7–6^{(7–3)}, 4–6, 6–0	1
136.	(Croatia) Marin Čilić	10	Monte-Carlo Masters, France	Clay	QF	6–0, 6–3	1
137.	(Spain) Rafael Nadal	5	Monte-Carlo Masters, France	Clay	SF	6–3, 6–3	1
138.	(Czech Republic) Tomáš Berdych	8	Monte-Carlo Masters, France	Clay	F	7–5, 4–6, 6–3	1
139.	(Japan) Kei Nishikori	6	Italian Open, Italy	Clay	QF	6–3, 3–6, 6–1	1
140.	(Spain) David Ferrer	8	Italian Open, Italy	Clay	SF	6–4, 6–4	1
141.	(Switzerland) Roger Federer	2	Italian Open, Italy	Clay	F	6–4, 6–3	1
142.	(Spain) Rafael Nadal	7	French Open, France	Clay	QF	7–5, 6–3, 6–1	1
143.	(United Kingdom) Andy Murray	3	French Open, France	Clay	SF	6–3, 6–3, 5–7, 5–7, 6–1	1
144.	(Croatia) Marin Čilić	9	Wimbledon, UK	Grass	QF	6–4, 6–4, 6–4	1
145.	(Switzerland) Roger Federer	2	Wimbledon, UK	Grass	F	7–6^{(7–1)}, 6–7^{(10–12)}, 6–4, 6–3	1
146.	(Switzerland) Stan Wawrinka	5	Cincinnati Open, US	Hard	QF	6–4, 6–1	1
147.	(Croatia) Marin Čilić	9	US Open, US	Hard	SF	6–0, 6–1, 6–2	1
148.	(Switzerland) Roger Federer	2	US Open, US	Hard	F	6–4, 5–7, 6–4, 6–4	1
149.	(Spain) David Ferrer	7	China Open, China	Hard	SF	6–2, 6–3	1
150.	(Spain) Rafael Nadal	8	China Open, China	Hard	F	6–2, 6–2	1
151.	(United Kingdom) Andy Murray	2	Shanghai Masters, China	Hard	SF	6–1, 6–3	1
152.	(Czech Republic) Tomáš Berdych	5	Paris Masters, France	Hard (i)	QF	7–6^{(7–3)}, 7–6^{(10–8)}	1
153.	(Switzerland) Stan Wawrinka	4	Paris Masters, France	Hard (i)	SF	6–3, 3–6, 6–0	1
154.	(United Kingdom) Andy Murray	3	Paris Masters, France	Hard (i)	F	6–2, 6–4	1
155.	(Japan) Kei Nishikori	8	ATP Finals, UK	Hard (i)	RR	6–1, 6–1	1
156.	(Czech Republic) Tomáš Berdych	6	ATP Finals, UK	Hard (i)	RR	6–3, 7–5	1
157.	(Spain) Rafael Nadal	5	ATP Finals, UK	Hard (i)	SF	6–3, 6–3	1
158.	(Switzerland) Roger Federer	3	ATP Finals, UK	Hard (i)	F	6–3, 6–4	1
2016
159.	(Czech Republic) Tomáš Berdych	6	Qatar Open, Qatar	Hard	SF	6–3, 7–6^{(7–3)}	1
160.	(Spain) Rafael Nadal	5	Qatar Open, Qatar	Hard	F	6–1, 6–2	1
161.	(Japan) Kei Nishikori	7	Australian Open, Australia	Hard	QF	6–3, 6–2, 6–4	1
162.	(Switzerland) Roger Federer	3	Australian Open, Australia	Hard	SF	6–1, 6–2, 3–6, 6–3	1
163.	(United Kingdom) Andy Murray	2	Australian Open, Australia	Hard	F	6–1, 7–5, 7–6^{(7–3)}	1
164.	(France) Jo-Wilfried Tsonga	9	Indian Wells Open, US	Hard	QF	7–6^{(7–2)}, 7–6^{(7–2)}	1
165.	(Spain) Rafael Nadal	5	Indian Wells Open, US	Hard	SF	7–6^{(7–5)}, 6–2	1
166.	(Czech Republic) Tomáš Berdych	7	Miami Open, US	Hard	QF	6–3, 6–3	1
167.	(Japan) Kei Nishikori	6	Miami Open, US	Hard	F	6–3, 6–3	1
168.	(Canada) Milos Raonic	10	Madrid Open, Spain	Clay	QF	6–3, 6–4	1
169.	(Japan) Kei Nishikori	6	Madrid Open, Spain	Clay	SF	6–3, 7–6^{(7–4)}	1
170.	(United Kingdom) Andy Murray	2	Madrid Open, Spain	Clay	F	6–2, 3–6, 6–3	1
171.	(Spain) Rafael Nadal	5	Italian Open, Italy	Clay	QF	7–5, 7–6^{(7–4)}	1
172.	(Japan) Kei Nishikori	6	Italian Open, Italy	Clay	SF	2–6, 6–4, 7–6^{(7–5)}	1
173.	(Czech Republic) Tomáš Berdych	8	French Open, France	Clay	QF	6–3, 7–5, 6–3	1
174.	(United Kingdom) Andy Murray	2	French Open, France	Clay	F	3–6, 6–1, 6–2, 6–4	1
175.	(Czech Republic) Tomáš Berdych	8	Canadian Open, Canada	Hard	QF	7–6^{(8–6)}, 6–4	1
176.	(Japan) Kei Nishikori	6	Canadian Open, Canada	Hard	F	6–3, 7–5	1
177.	(Austria) Dominic Thiem	9	ATP Finals, UK	Hard (i)	RR	6–7^{(10–12)}, 6–0, 6–2	2
178.	(Canada) Milos Raonic	4	ATP Finals, UK	Hard (i)	RR	7–6^{(8–6)}, 7–6^{(7–5)}	2
179.	(Japan) Kei Nishikori	5	ATP Finals, UK	Hard (i)	SF	6–1, 6–1	2
2017
180.	(United Kingdom) Andy Murray	1	Qatar Open, Qatar	Hard	F	6–3, 5–7, 6–4	2
181.	(Austria) Dominic Thiem	7	Italian Open, Italy	Clay	SF	6–1, 6–0	2
2018
182.	(Bulgaria) Grigor Dimitrov	5	Queen's Club Championships, UK	Grass	2R	6–4, 6–1	22
183.	(Spain) Rafael Nadal	1	Wimbledon, UK	Grass	SF	6–4, 3–6, 7–6^{(11–9)}, 3–6, 10–8	21
184.	(South Africa) Kevin Anderson	8	Wimbledon, UK	Grass	F	6–2, 6–2, 7–6^{(7–3)}	21
185.	(Bulgaria) Grigor Dimitrov	5	Cincinnati Open, US	Hard	3R	2–6, 6–3, 6–4	10
186.	(Croatia) Marin Čilić	7	Cincinnati Open, US	Hard	SF	6–4, 3–6, 6–3	10
187.	(Switzerland) Roger Federer	2	Cincinnati Open, US	Hard	F	6–4, 6–4	10
188.	(Argentina) Juan Martín del Potro	3	US Open, US	Hard	F	6–3, 7–6^{(7–4)}, 6–3	6
189.	(South Africa) Kevin Anderson	8	Shanghai Masters, China	Hard	QF	7–6^{(7–1)}, 6–3	3
190.	(Germany) Alexander Zverev	5	Shanghai Masters, China	Hard	SF	6–2, 6–1	3
191.	(Croatia) Marin Čilić	7	Paris Masters, France	Hard (i)	QF	4–6, 6–2, 6–3	2
192.	(Switzerland) Roger Federer	3	Paris Masters, France	Hard (i)	SF	7–6^{(8–6)}, 5–7, 7–6^{(7–3)}	2
193.	(United States) John Isner	10	ATP Finals, UK	Hard (i)	RR	6–4, 6–3	1
194.	(Germany) Alexander Zverev	5	ATP Finals, UK	Hard (i)	RR	6–4, 6–1	1
195.	(Croatia) Marin Čilić	7	ATP Finals, UK	Hard (i)	RR	7–6^{(9–7)}, 6–2	1
196.	(South Africa) Kevin Anderson	6	ATP Finals, UK	Hard (i)	SF	6–2, 6–2	1
2019
197.	(Japan) Kei Nishikori	9	Australian Open, Australia	Hard	QF	6–1, 4–1, ret.	1
198.	(Spain) Rafael Nadal	2	Australian Open, Australia	Hard	F	6–3, 6–2, 6–3	1
199.	(Austria) Dominic Thiem	5	Madrid Open, Spain	Clay	SF	7–6^{(7–2)}, 7–6^{(7–4)}	1
200.	(Greece) Stefanos Tsitsipas	9	Madrid Open, Spain	Clay	F	6–3, 6–4	1
201.	(Argentina) Juan Martín del Potro	9	Italian Open, Italy	Clay	QF	4–6, 7–6^{(8–6)}, 6–4	1
202.	(Germany) Alexander Zverev	5	French Open, France	Clay	QF	7–5, 6–2, 6–2	1
203.	(Switzerland) Roger Federer	3	Wimbledon, UK	Grass	F	7–6^{(7–5)}, 1–6, 7–6^{(7–4)}, 4–6, 13–12^{(7–3)}	1
204.	(Greece) Stefanos Tsitsipas	7	Paris Masters, France	Hard (i)	QF	6–1, 6–2	1
205.	(Italy) Matteo Berrettini	8	ATP Finals, UK	Hard (i)	RR	6–2, 6–1	2
2020
206.	(France) Gaël Monfils	10	ATP Cup, Australia	Hard	RR	6–3, 6–2	2
207.	(Russia) Daniil Medvedev	5	ATP Cup, Australia	Hard	SF	6–1, 5–7, 6–4	2
208.	(Spain) Rafael Nadal	1	ATP Cup, Australia	Hard	F	6–2, 7–6^{(7–4)}	2
209.	(Switzerland) Roger Federer	3	Australian Open, Australia	Hard	SF	7–6^{(7–1)}, 6–4, 6–3	2
210.	(Austria) Dominic Thiem	5	Australian Open, Australia	Hard	F	6–4, 4–6, 2–6, 6–3, 6–4	2
211.	(France) Gaël Monfils	9	Dubai Championships, UAE	Hard	SF	2–6, 7–6^{(10–8)}, 6–1	1
212.	(Greece) Stefanos Tsitsipas	6	Dubai Championships, UAE	Hard	F	6–3, 6–4	1
213.	(Greece) Stefanos Tsitsipas	6	French Open, France	Clay	SF	6–3, 6–2, 5–7, 4–6, 6–1	1
214.	(Argentina) Diego Schwartzman	9	ATP Finals, UK	Hard (i)	RR	6–3, 6–2	1
215.	(Germany) Alexander Zverev	7	ATP Finals, UK	Hard (i)	RR	6–3, 7–6^{(7–4)}	1
2021
216.	(Germany) Alexander Zverev	7	ATP Cup, Australia	Hard	RR	6–7^{(3–7)}, 6–2, 7–5	1
217.	(Germany) Alexander Zverev	7	Australian Open, Australia	Hard	QF	6–7^{(6–8)}, 6–2, 6–4, 7–6^{(8–6)}	1
218.	(Russia) Daniil Medvedev	4	Australian Open, Australia	Hard	F	7–5, 6–2, 6–2	1
219.	(Greece) Stefanos Tsitsipas	6	Italian Open, Italy	Clay	QF	4–6, 7–5, 7–5	1
220.	(Italy) Matteo Berrettini	9	French Open, France	Clay	QF	6–3, 6–2, 6–7^{(5–7)}, 7–5	1
221.	(Spain) Rafael Nadal	3	French Open, France	Clay	SF	3–6, 6–3, 7–6^{(7–4)}, 6–2	1
222.	(Greece) Stefanos Tsitsipas	5	French Open, France	Clay	F	6–7^{(6–8)}, 2–6, 6–3, 6–2, 6–4	1
223.	(Italy) Matteo Berrettini	9	Wimbledon, UK	Grass	F	6–7^{(4–7)}, 6–4, 6–4, 6–3	1
224.	(Italy) Matteo Berrettini	8	US Open, US	Hard	QF	5–7, 6–2, 6–2, 6–3	1
225.	(Germany) Alexander Zverev	4	US Open, US	Hard	SF	4–6, 6–2, 6–4, 4–6, 6–2	1
226.	(Poland) Hubert Hurkacz	10	Paris Masters, France	Hard (i)	SF	3–6, 6–0, 7–6^{(7–5)}	1
227.	(Russia) Daniil Medvedev	2	Paris Masters, France	Hard (i)	F	4–6, 6–3, 6–3	1
228.	(Norway) Casper Ruud	8	ATP Finals, Italy	Hard (i)	RR	7–6^{(7–4)}, 6–2	1
229.	(Russia) Andrey Rublev	5	ATP Finals, Italy	Hard (i)	RR	6–3, 6–2	1
2022
230.	(Canada) Félix Auger-Aliassime	9	Italian Open, Italy	Clay	QF	7–5, 7–6^{(7–1)}	1
231.	(Norway) Casper Ruud	10	Italian Open, Italy	Clay	SF	6–4, 6–3	1
232.	(Greece) Stefanos Tsitsipas	5	Italian Open, Italy	Clay	F	6–0, 7–6^{(7–5)}	1
233.	Daniil Medvedev	4	Astana Open, Kazakhstan	Hard (i)	SF	4–6, 7–6^{(8–6)}, ret.	7
234.	(Greece) Stefanos Tsitsipas	6	Astana Open, Kazakhstan	Hard (i)	F	6–3, 6–4	7
235.	(Greece) Stefanos Tsitsipas	5	Paris Masters, France	Hard (i)	SF	6–2, 3–6, 7–6^{(7–4)}	7
236.	(Greece) Stefanos Tsitsipas	3	ATP Finals, Italy	Hard (i)	RR	6–4, 7–6^{(7–4)}	8
237.	Andrey Rublev	7	ATP Finals, Italy	Hard (i)	RR	6–4, 6–1	8
238.	Daniil Medvedev	5	ATP Finals, Italy	Hard (i)	RR	6–3, 6–7^{(5–7)}, 7–6^{(7–2)}	8
239.	(United States) Taylor Fritz	9	ATP Finals, Italy	Hard (i)	SF	7–6^{(7–5)}, 7–6^{(8–6)}	8
240.	(Norway) Casper Ruud	4	ATP Finals, Italy	Hard (i)	F	7–5, 6–3	8
2023
241.	Daniil Medvedev	7	Adelaide International, Australia	Hard	SF	6–3, 6–4	5
242.	Andrey Rublev	6	Australian Open, Australia	Hard	QF	6–1, 6–2, 6–4	5
243.	(Greece) Stefanos Tsitsipas	4	Australian Open, Australia	Hard	F	6–3, 7–6^{(7–4)}, 7–6^{(7–5)}	5
244.	(Spain) Carlos Alcaraz	1	French Open, France	Clay	SF	6–3, 5–7, 6–1, 6–1	3
245.	(Norway) Casper Ruud	4	French Open, France	Clay	F	7–6^{(7–1)}, 6–3, 7–5	3
246.	Andrey Rublev	7	Wimbledon, UK	Grass	QF	4–6, 6–1, 6–4, 6–3	2
247.	(Italy) Jannik Sinner	8	Wimbledon, UK	Grass	SF	6–3, 6–4, 7–6^{(7–4)}	2
248.	(United States) Taylor Fritz	9	Cincinnati Open, US	Hard	QF	6–0, 6–4	2
249.	(Spain) Carlos Alcaraz	1	Cincinnati Open, US	Hard	F	5–7, 7–6^{(9–7)}, 7–6^{(7–4)}	2
250.	(United States) Taylor Fritz	9	US Open, US	Hard	QF	6–1, 6–4, 6–4	2
251.	Daniil Medvedev	3	US Open, US	Hard	F	6–3, 7–6^{(7–5)}, 6–3	2
252.	(Denmark) Holger Rune	7	Paris Masters, France	Hard (i)	QF	7–5, 6–7^{(3–7)}, 6–4	1
253.	Andrey Rublev	5	Paris Masters, France	Hard (i)	SF	5–7, 7–6^{(7–3)}, 7–5	1
254.	(Denmark) Holger Rune	8	ATP Finals, Italy	Hard (i)	RR	7–6^{(7–4)}, 6–7^{(1–7)}, 6–3	1
255.	(Poland) Hubert Hurkacz	9	ATP Finals, Italy	Hard (i)	RR	7–6^{(7–1)}, 4–6, 6–1	1
256.	(Spain) Carlos Alcaraz	2	ATP Finals, Italy	Hard (i)	SF	6–3, 6–2	1
257.	(Italy) Jannik Sinner	4	ATP Finals, Italy	Hard (i)	F	6–3, 6–3	1
2024
258.	(Spain) Carlos Alcaraz	3	Paris Olympics, France	Clay	F	7–6^{(7–3)}, 7–6^{(7–2)}	2
259.	(United States) Taylor Fritz	7	Shanghai Masters, China	Hard	SF	6–4, 7–6^{(8–6)}	4
2025
260.	(Spain) Carlos Alcaraz	3	Australian Open, Australia	Hard	QF	4–6, 6–4, 6–3, 6–4	7
261.	(Germany) Alexander Zverev	3	French Open, France	Clay	QF	4–6, 6–3, 6–2, 6–4	6
262.	(United States) Taylor Fritz	4	US Open, US	Hard	QF	6–3, 7–5, 3–6, 6–4	7
263.	(Italy) Lorenzo Musetti	9	Hellenic Championship, Greece	Hard (i)	F	4–6, 6–3, 7–5	5
2026
264.	(Italy) Lorenzo Musetti	5	Australian Open, Australia	Hard	QF	4–6, 3–6, 3–1, ret.	4
265.	(Italy) Jannik Sinner	2	Australian Open, Australia	Hard	SF	3–6, 6–3, 4–6, 6–4, 6–4	4
266.	(Canada) Félix Auger-Aliassime	4	Wimbledon, UK	Grass	QF	7–6^{(12–10)}, 3–6, 6–3, 6–7^{(4–7)}, 7–6^{(10–4)}	8
267.	(Germany) Alexander Zverev	2	China Open, China	Hard	QF	4–6, 6–4, 6–4	11
268.	Daniil Medvedev	5	China Open, China	Hard	SF	7–5, 5–3, def.	11
269.	(Australia) Alex de Minaur	9	China Open, China	Hard	F	7–6^{(7–3)}, 0–1, ret.	11

- Key: (Rk) first use, opponent rank; (Rd) round; (Rk) 2nd use, player rank; (Ref) reference; (F) final; (SF) semifinal; (QF) quarterfinal; (#R) rounds 4, 3, 2, 1; (RR) round-robin stage; (Q#) qualifying rounds or stages (3), 2, 1.

== Winning streaks ==
Djokovic has had ten 20+ match win streaks in his career: 43 (2010–11), 29 (2019–20), 28 (2013–14), 28 (2015), 23 (2015), 22 (2012–13), 22 (2021) and 20 (2022–23).

=== 43–win streak 2010–11 ===
Djokovic's 43-match winning streak in 2010–11 is the fifth longest in the Open Era. It also covers 41 straight match wins since the start of 2011, which is the second longest winning streak to start a season after John McEnroe's 42 wins in 1984.

No.	Match	Tournament	Tier	Surface	Date	Round	Opponent	Rank	Score
/	427	ATP Tour Finals	ATP Finals	Hard (i)	21.11.2010	SF	(Switzerland) Roger Federer	2	1–6, 4–6
1	428	Davis Cup Final	Davis Cup	Hard (i)	03.12.2010	F	(France) Gilles Simon	42	6–3, 6–1, 7–5
2	429	Davis Cup Final	Davis Cup	Hard (i)	03.12.2010	F	(France) Gaël Monfils	12	6–2, 6–2, 6–4
3	430	Australian Open	Grand Slam	Hard	17.01.2011	R128	(Spain) Marcel Granollers	42	6–1, 6–3, 6–1
4	431	Australian Open	Grand Slam	Hard	17.01.2011	R64	(Croatia) Ivan Dodig	81	7–5, 6–7^{(6–8)}, 6–0, 6–2
5	432	Australian Open	Grand Slam	Hard	17.01.2011	R32	(Serbia) Viktor Troicki	27	6–2, Ret.
6	433	Australian Open	Grand Slam	Hard	17.01.2011	R16	(Spain) Nicolás Almagro	14	6–3, 6–4, 6–0
7	434	Australian Open	Grand Slam	Hard	17.01.2011	QF	(Czech Republic) Tomáš Berdych	6	6–1, 7–6^{(7–5)}, 6–1
8	435	Australian Open	Grand Slam	Hard	17.01.2011	SF	(Switzerland) Roger Federer	2	7–6^{(7–3)}, 7–5, 6–4
9	436	Australian Open	Grand Slam	Hard	17.01.2011	F	(United Kingdom) Andy Murray	5	6–4, 6–2, 6–3
10	437	Dubai Championships	ATP 500	Hard	21.02.2011	R32	(France) Michaël Llodra	27	6–3, 6–3
11	438	Dubai Championships	ATP 500	Hard	21.02.2011	R16	(Spain) Feliciano López	41	6–3, 2–6, 6–4
12	439	Dubai Championships	ATP 500	Hard	21.02.2011	QF	(Germany) Florian Mayer	38	7–5, 6–1
13	440	Dubai Championships	ATP 500	Hard	21.02.2011	SF	(Czech Republic) Tomáš Berdych (2)	7	6–7^{(5–7)}, 6–2, 4–2 Ret.
14	441	Dubai Championships	ATP 500	Hard	21.02.2011	F	(Switzerland) Roger Federer (2)	2	6–3, 6–3
15	442	Indian Wells Open	ATP 1000	Hard	07.03.2011	R64	(Kazakhstan) Andrey Golubev	39	6–0, 6–4
16	443	Indian Wells Open	ATP 1000	Hard	07.03.2011	R32	(Latvia) Ernests Gulbis	34	6–0, 6–1
17	444	Indian Wells Open	ATP 1000	Hard	07.03.2011	R16	(Serbia) Viktor Troicki (2)	18	6–0, 6–1
18	445	Indian Wells Open	ATP 1000	Hard	07.03.2011	QF	(France) Richard Gasquet	21	6–2, 6–4
19	446	Indian Wells Open	ATP 1000	Hard	07.03.2011	SF	(Switzerland) Roger Federer (3)	2	6–3, 3–6, 6–2
20	447	Indian Wells Open	ATP 1000	Hard	07.03.2011	F	(Spain) Rafael Nadal	1	4–6, 6–3, 6–2
21	448	Miami Open	ATP 1000	Hard	22.03.2011	R64	(Uzbekistan) Denis Istomin	54	6–0, 6–1
22	449	Miami Open	ATP 1000	Hard	22.03.2011	R32	(United States) James Blake	173	6–2, 6–0
23	450	Miami Open	ATP 1000	Hard	22.03.2011	R16	(Serbia) Viktor Troicki (3)	17	6–3, 6–2
24	451	Miami Open	ATP 1000	Hard	22.03.2011	QF	(South Africa) Kevin Anderson	40	6–4, 6–2
25	452	Miami Open	ATP 1000	Hard	22.03.2011	SF	(United States) Mardy Fish	15	6–3, 6–1
26	453	Miami Open	ATP 1000	Hard	22.03.2011	F	(Spain) Rafael Nadal (2)	1	4–6, 6–3, 7–6^{(7–4)}
27	454	Serbia Open	ATP 250	Clay	23.4.2011	R16	(Romania) Adrian Ungur	175	6–2, 6–3
28	455	Serbia Open	ATP 250	Clay	23.4.2011	QF	(Slovenia) Blaž Kavčič	85	6–3, 6–2
—		Serbia Open	ATP 250	Clay	23.4.2011	SF	(Serbia) Janko Tipsarević	36	w/o
29	456	Serbia Open	ATP 250	Clay	23.4.2011	F	(Spain) Feliciano López (2)	37	7–6^{(7–4)}, 6–2
30	457	Madrid Open	ATP 1000	Clay	30.04.2011	R32	(South Africa) Kevin Anderson (2)	35	6–3, 6–4
31	458	Madrid Open	ATP 1000	Clay	30.04.2011	R16	(Spain) Guillermo García López	29	6–1, 6–2
32	459	Madrid Open	ATP 1000	Clay	30.04.2011	QF	(Spain) David Ferrer	6	6–4, 4–6, 6–3
33	460	Madrid Open	ATP 1000	Clay	30.04.2011	SF	(Brazil) Thomaz Bellucci	36	4–6, 6–4, 6–1
34	461	Madrid Open	ATP 1000	Clay	30.04.2011	F	(Spain) Rafael Nadal (3)	1	7–5, 6–4
35	462	Italian Open	ATP 1000	Clay	09.05.2011	R32	(Poland) Łukasz Kubot	141	6–0, 6–3
36	463	Italian Open	ATP 1000	Clay	09.05.2011	R16	(Switzerland) Stan Wawrinka	14	6–4, 6–1
37	464	Italian Open	ATP 1000	Clay	09.05.2011	QF	(Sweden) Robin Söderling	5	6–3, 6–0
38	465	Italian Open	ATP 1000	Clay	09.05.2011	SF	(United Kingdom) Andy Murray (2)	4	6–1, 3–6, 7–6^{(7–2)}
39	466	Italian Open	ATP 1000	Clay	09.05.2011	F	(Spain) Rafael Nadal (4)	1	6–4, 6–4
40	467	French Open	Grand Slam	Clay	22.05.2011	R128	(Netherlands) Thiemo de Bakker	71	6–2, 6–1, 6–3
41	468	French Open	Grand Slam	Clay	22.05.2011	R64	(Romania) Victor Hănescu	60	6–4, 6–1, 2–3 Ret.
42	469	French Open	Grand Slam	Clay	22.05.2011	R32	(Argentina) Juan Martín del Potro	26	6–3, 3–6, 6–3, 6–2
43	470	French Open	Grand Slam	Clay	22.05.2011	R16	(France) Richard Gasquet (2)	16	6–4, 6–4, 6–2
—		French Open	Grand Slam	Clay	22.05.2011	QF	(Italy) Fabio Fognini	49	w/o
/	471	French Open	Grand Slam	Clay	22.05.2011	SF	(Switzerland) Roger Federer	3	6–7^{(5–7)}, 3–6, 6–3, 6–7^{(5–7)}

=== 43–win streak in Australia 2019–24 ===
Djokovic's 43-match winning streak in Australia began at the Australian Open in 2019 and ended at the 2024 United Cup.

No.	Tournament	Tier	Surface	Date	Round	Opponent	Rank	Score
/	Australian Open	Grand Slam	Hard	15.01.2018	R16	(South Korea) Hyeon Chung	58	6–7^{(4–7)}, 5–7, 6–7^{(3–7)}
1	Australian Open	Grand Slam	Hard	14.01.2019	R128	(United States) Mitchell Krueger	230	6–3, 6–2, 6–2
2	Australian Open	Grand Slam	Hard	14.01.2019	R64	(France) Jo-Wilfried Tsonga	177	6–3, 7–5, 6–4
3	Australian Open	Grand Slam	Hard	14.01.2019	R32	(Canada) Denis Shapovalov	27	6–3, 6–4, 4–6, 6–0
4	Australian Open	Grand Slam	Hard	14.01.2019	R16	(Russia) Daniil Medvedev	19	6–4, 6–7^{(5–7)}, 6–2, 6–3
5	Australian Open	Grand Slam	Hard	14.01.2019	QF	(Japan) Kei Nishikori	9	6–1, 4–1 Ret.
6	Australian Open	Grand Slam	Hard	14.01.2019	SF	(France) Lucas Pouille	31	6–0, 6–2, 6–2
7	Australian Open	Grand Slam	Hard	14.01.2019	F	(Spain) Rafael Nadal	2	6–3, 6–2, 6–3
8	ATP Cup	ATP Cup	Hard	03.01.2020	RR	(South Africa) Kevin Anderson	147	7–6^{(7–5)}, 7–6^{(8–6)}
9	ATP Cup	ATP Cup	Hard	03.01.2020	RR	(France) Gaël Monfils	9	6–3, 6–2
10	ATP Cup	ATP Cup	Hard	03.01.2020	RR	(Chile) Cristian Garín	33	6–3, 6–3
11	ATP Cup	ATP Cup	Hard	03.01.2020	QF	(Canada) Denis Shapovalov (2)	14	4–6, 6–1, 7–6^{(7–4)}
12	ATP Cup	ATP Cup	Hard	03.01.2020	SF	(Russia) Daniil Medvedev (2)	5	6–1, 5–7, 6–4
13	ATP Cup	ATP Cup	Hard	03.01.2020	F	(Spain) Rafael Nadal (2)	1	6–2, 7–6^{(7–4)}
14	Australian Open	Grand Slam	Hard	20.01.2020	R128	(Germany) Jan-Lennard Struff	37	7–6^{(7–5)}, 6–2, 2–6, 6–1
15	Australian Open	Grand Slam	Hard	20.01.2020	R64	(Japan) Tatsuma Ito	146	6–1, 6–4, 6–2
16	Australian Open	Grand Slam	Hard	20.01.2020	R32	(Japan) Yoshihito Nishioka	71	6–3, 6–2, 6–2
17	Australian Open	Grand Slam	Hard	20.01.2020	R16	(Argentina) Diego Schwartzman	14	6–3, 6–4, 6–4
18	Australian Open	Grand Slam	Hard	20.01.2020	QF	(Canada) Milos Raonic	35	6–4, 6–3, 7–6^{(7–1)}
19	Australian Open	Grand Slam	Hard	20.01.2020	SF	(Switzerland) Roger Federer	3	7–6^{(7–1)}, 6–4, 6–3
20	Australian Open	Grand Slam	Hard	20.01.2020	F	(Austria) Dominic Thiem	5	6–4, 4–6, 2–6, 6–3, 6–4
21	ATP Cup	ATP Cup	Hard	02.02.2021	RR	(Canada) Denis Shapovalov (3)	12	7–5, 7–5
22	ATP Cup	ATP Cup	Hard	02.02.2021	RR	(Germany) Alexander Zverev	7	6–7^{(3–7)}, 6–2, 7–5
23	Australian Open	Grand Slam	Hard	08.02.2021	R128	(France) Jérémy Chardy	61	6–3, 6–1, 6–2
24	Australian Open	Grand Slam	Hard	08.02.2021	R64	(United States) Frances Tiafoe	64	6–3, 6–7^{(3–7)}, 7–6^{(7–2)}, 6–3
25	Australian Open	Grand Slam	Hard	08.02.2021	R32	(United States) Taylor Fritz	31	7–6^{(7–1)}, 6–4, 3–6, 4–6, 6–2
26	Australian Open	Grand Slam	Hard	08.02.2021	R16	(Canada) Milos Raonic (2)	14	7–6^{(7–4)}, 4–6, 6–1, 6–4
27	Australian Open	Grand Slam	Hard	08.02.2021	QF	(Germany) Alexander Zverev (2)	7	6–7^{(6–8)}, 6–2, 6–4, 7–6^{(8–6)}
28	Australian Open	Grand Slam	Hard	08.02.2021	SF	(Russia) Aslan Karatsev	114	6–3, 6–4, 6–2
29	Australian Open	Grand Slam	Hard	08.02.2021	F	(Russia) Daniil Medvedev (3)	4	7–5, 6–2, 6–2
30	Adelaide International 1	ATP 250	Hard	01.01.2023	R32	(France) Constant Lestienne	65	6–3, 6–2,
31	Adelaide International 1	ATP 250	Hard	01.01.2023	R16	(France) Quentin Halys	64	7–6^{(7–3)}, 7–6^{(7–5)}
32	Adelaide International 1	ATP 250	Hard	01.01.2023	QF	(Canada) Denis Shapovalov (4)	18	6–3, 6–4
33	Adelaide International 1	ATP 250	Hard	01.01.2023	SF	(Russia) Daniil Medvedev (4)	7	6–3, 6–4
34	Adelaide International 1	ATP 250	Hard	01.01.2023	F	(United States) Sebastian Korda	33	6–7^{(8–10)}, 7–6^{(7–3)}, 6–4
35	Australian Open	Grand Slam	Hard	16.01.2023	R128	(Spain) Roberto Carballés Baena	75	6–3, 6–4, 6–0
36	Australian Open	Grand Slam	Hard	16.01.2023	R64	(France) Enzo Couacaud	191	6–1, 6–7^{(5–7)}, 6–2, 6–0
37	Australian Open	Grand Slam	Hard	16.01.2023	R32	(Bulgaria) Grigor Dimitrov	28	7–6^{(9–7)}, 6–3, 6–4
38	Australian Open	Grand Slam	Hard	16.01.2023	R16	(Australia) Alex de Minaur	24	6–2, 6–1, 6–2
39	Australian Open	Grand Slam	Hard	16.01.2023	QF	(Russia) Andrey Rublev	6	6–1, 6–2, 6–4
40	Australian Open	Grand Slam	Hard	16.01.2023	SF	(United States) Tommy Paul	35	7–5, 6–1, 6–2
41	Australian Open	Grand Slam	Hard	16.01.2023	F	(Greece) Stefanos Tsitsipas	4	6–3, 7–6^{(7–4)}, 7–6^{(7–5)}
42	United Cup	United Cup	Hard	29.12.2023	RR	(China) Zhang Zhizhen	58	6–3, 6–2
43	United Cup	United Cup	Hard	29.12.2023	RR	(Czech Republic) Jiří Lehečka	31	6–1, 6–7^{(2–7)}, 6–1
/	United Cup	United Cup	Hard	29.12.2023	QF	(Australia) Alex de Minaur	12	4–6, 4–6

=== 38–win indoors streak 2012–2015 ===
No.	Tournament	Tier	Surface	Date	Round	Opponent	Rank	Score
/	Paris Masters	ATP 1000	Hard	29.10.2012	R32	(United States) Sam Querrey	23	6–0, 6–7^{(4–7)}, 4–6
1	ATP World Tour Finals	ATP Finals	Hard	05.11.2012	RR	(France) Jo-Wilfried Tsonga	8	7–6^{(7–4)}, 6–3
2	ATP World Tour Finals	ATP Finals	Hard	05.11.2012	RR	(United Kingdom) Andy Murray	3	4–6, 6–3, 7–5
3	ATP World Tour Finals	ATP Finals	Hard	05.11.2012	RR	(Czech Republic) Tomáš Berdych	6	6–2, 7–6^{(8–6)}
4	ATP World Tour Finals	ATP Finals	Hard	05.11.2012	SF	(Argentina) Juan Martín del Potro	7	4–6, 6–3, 6–2
5	ATP World Tour Finals	ATP Finals	Hard	05.11.2012	F	(Switzerland) Roger Federer	2	7–6^{(8–6)}, 7–5
6	Davis Cup World Group 1R	Davis Cup	Clay	01.02.2013	R2	(Belgium) Olivier Rochus	127	6–3, 6–2, 6–2
7	Davis Cup World Group QF	Davis Cup	Hard	05.04.2013	R1	(United States) John Isner	23	7–6^{(7–5)}, 6–2, 7–5
8	Davis Cup World Group QF	Davis Cup	Hard	05.04.2013	R4	(United States) Sam Querrey	20	7–5, 6–7^{(4–7)}, 6–1, 6–0
9	Davis Cup World Group SF	Davis Cup	Clay	13.09.2013	R1	(Canada) Vasek Pospisil	41	6–2, 6–0, 6–4
10	Davis Cup World Group SF	Davis Cup	Clay	13.09.2013	R4	(Canada) Milos Raonic	11	7–6^{(7–1)}, 6–2, 6–2
11	Paris Masters	ATP 1000	Hard	28.10.2013	R32	(France) Pierre-Hugues Herbert	189	7–6^{(7–3)}, 6–3
12	Paris Masters	ATP 1000	Hard	28.10.2013	R16	(United States) John Isner (2)	16	6–7^{(5–7)}, 6–1, 6–2
13	Paris Masters	ATP 1000	Hard	28.10.2013	QF	(Switzerland) Stanislas Wawrinka	8	6–1, 6–4
14	Paris Masters	ATP 1000	Hard	28.10.2013	SF	(Switzerland) Roger Federer (2)	6	4–6, 6–3, 6–2
15	Paris Masters	ATP 1000	Hard	28.10.2013	F	(Spain) David Ferrer	3	7–5, 7–5
16	ATP World Tour Finals	ATP Finals	Hard	04.11.2013	RR	(Switzerland) Roger Federer (3)	7	6–4, 6–7^{(2–7)}, 6–2
17	ATP World Tour Finals	ATP Finals	Hard	04.11.2013	RR	(Argentina) Juan Martín del Potro (2)	5	6–3, 3–6, 6–3
18	ATP World Tour Finals	ATP Finals	Hard	04.11.2013	RR	(France) Richard Gasquet	9	7–6^{(7–5)}, 4–6, 6–3
19	ATP World Tour Finals	ATP Finals	Hard	04.11.2013	SF	(Switzerland) Stanislas Wawrinka (2)	8	6–3, 6–3
20	ATP World Tour Finals	ATP Finals	Hard	04.11.2013	F	(Spain) Rafael Nadal	1	6–3, 6–4
21	Davis Cup World Group F	Davis Cup	Hard	15.11.2013	R1	(Czech Republic) Radek Štěpánek	44	7–5, 6–1, 6–4
22	Davis Cup World Group F	Davis Cup	Hard	15.11.2013	R4	(Czech Republic) Tomáš Berdych (2)	7	6–4, 7–6^{(7–5)}, 6–2
23	Paris Masters	ATP 1000	Hard	28.10.2014	R32	(Germany) Philipp Kohlschreiber	24	6–3, 6–4
24	Paris Masters	ATP 1000	Hard	28.10.2014	R16	(France) Gaël Monfils	21	6–3, 7–6^{(7–2)}
25	Paris Masters	ATP 1000	Hard	28.10.2014	QF	(United Kingdom) Andy Murray (2)	8	7–5, 6–2
26	Paris Masters	ATP 1000	Hard	28.10.2014	SF	(Japan) Kei Nishikori	7	6–2, 6–3
27	Paris Masters	ATP 1000	Hard	28.10.2014	F	(Canada) Milos Raonic (2)	10	6–2, 6–3
28	ATP World Tour Finals	ATP Finals	Hard	09.11.2014	RR	(Croatia) Marin Čilić	9	6–1, 6–1
29	ATP World Tour Finals	ATP Finals	Hard	09.11.2014	RR	(Switzerland) Stan Wawrinka (3)	4	6–3, 6–0
30	ATP World Tour Finals	ATP Finals	Hard	09.11.2014	RR	(Czech Republic) Tomáš Berdych (3)	7	6–2, 6–2
31	ATP World Tour Finals	ATP Finals	Hard	09.11.2014	SF	(Japan) Kei Nishikori (2)	5	6–1, 3–6, 6–0
—	ATP World Tour Finals	ATP Finals	Hard	09.11.2014	F	(Switzerland) Roger Federer (4)	2	w/o
32	Davis Cup World Group 1R	Davis Cup	Hard	06.03.2015	R1	(Croatia) Mate Delić	158	6–3, 6–2, 6–4
33	Paris Masters	ATP 1000	Hard	31.10.2015	R32	(Brazil) Thomaz Bellucci	40	7–5, 6–3
34	Paris Masters	ATP 1000	Hard	31.10.2015	R16	(France) Gilles Simon	15	6–3, 7–5
35	Paris Masters	ATP 1000	Hard	31.10.2015	QF	(Czech Republic) Tomáš Berdych (4)	5	7–6^{(7–3)}, 7–6^{(10–8)}
36	Paris Masters	ATP 1000	Hard	31.10.2015	SF	(Switzerland) Stan Wawrinka (4)	4	6–3, 3–6, 6–0
37	Paris Masters	ATP 1000	Hard	31.10.2015	F	(United Kingdom) Andy Murray (3)	3	6–2, 6–4
38	ATP World Tour Finals	ATP Finals	Hard	15.11.2015	RR	(Japan) Kei Nishikori (3)	8	6–1, 6–1
/	ATP World Tour Finals	ATP Finals	Hard	15.11.2015	RR	(Switzerland) Roger Federer	3	5–7, 2–6

=== 30–win Grand Slam tournament streak 2015–2016 ===
Djokovic won 30-consecutive singles matches at majors which is the longest winning streak in the Open Era at Grand Slam tournaments. By doing so, he became the third man in tennis history to hold all four major titles at once, joining Don Budge six majors in 1937–38 (37 match wins streak) and Rod Laver four majors in 1962 (31 match wins streak) and four majors in 1969 (29 match wins streak).

No.	Tournament	Surface	Date	Round	Opponent	Rank	Score
/	2015 French Open	Clay	24.05.2015	F	(Switzerland) Stan Wawrinka	9	6–4, 4–6, 3–6, 4–6
1	2015 Wimbledon	Grass	29.06.2015	R128	(Germany) Philipp Kohlschreiber	33	6–4, 6–4, 6–4
2	2015 Wimbledon	Grass	29.06.2015	R64	(Finland) Jarkko Nieminen	92	6–4, 6–2, 6–3
3	2015 Wimbledon	Grass	29.06.2015	R32	(Australia) Bernard Tomic	26	6–3, 6–3, 6–3
4	2015 Wimbledon	Grass	29.06.2015	R16	(South Africa) Kevin Anderson	14	6–7^{(6–8)}, 6–7^{(6–8)}, 6–1, 6–4, 7–5
5	2015 Wimbledon	Grass	29.06.2015	QF	(Croatia) Marin Čilić	9	6–4, 6–4, 6–4
6	2015 Wimbledon	Grass	29.06.2015	SF	(France) Richard Gasquet	20	7–6^{(7–2)}, 6–4, 6–4
7	2015 Wimbledon	Grass	29.06.2015	F	(Switzerland) Roger Federer	2	7–6^{(7–1)}, 6–7^{(10–12)}, 6–4, 6–3
8	2015 US Open	Hard	31.08.2015	R128	(Brazil) João Souza	91	6–1, 6–1, 6–1
9	2015 US Open	Hard	31.08.2015	R64	(Austria) Andreas Haider-Maurer	52	6–4, 6–1, 6–2
10	2015 US Open	Hard	31.08.2015	R32	(Italy) Andreas Seppi	25	6–3, 7–5, 7–5
11	2015 US Open	Hard	31.08.2015	R16	(Spain) Roberto Bautista Agut	23	6–3, 4–6, 6–4, 6–3
12	2015 US Open	Hard	31.08.2015	QF	(Spain) Feliciano López	19	6–1, 3–6, 6–3, 7–6^{(7–2)}
13	2015 US Open	Hard	31.08.2015	SF	(Croatia) Marin Čilić (2)	9	6–0, 6–1, 6–2
14	2015 US Open	Hard	31.08.2015	F	(Switzerland) Roger Federer (2)	2	6–4, 5–7, 6–4, 6–4
15	2016 Australian Open	Hard	18.01.2016	R128	(South Korea) Hyeon Chung	52	6–3, 6–2, 6–4
16	2016 Australian Open	Hard	18.01.2016	R64	(France) Quentin Halys	187	6–1, 6–2, 7–6^{(7–3)}
17	2016 Australian Open	Hard	18.01.2016	R32	(Italy) Andreas Seppi (2)	29	6–1, 7–5, 7–6^{(8–6)}
18	2016 Australian Open	Hard	18.01.2016	R16	(France) Gilles Simon	15	6–3, 6–7^{(1–7)}, 6–4, 4–6, 6–3
19	2016 Australian Open	Hard	18.01.2016	QF	(Japan) Kei Nishikori	7	6–3, 6–2, 6–4
20	2016 Australian Open	Hard	18.01.2016	SF	(Switzerland) Roger Federer (3)	3	6–1, 6–2, 3–6, 6–3
21	2016 Australian Open	Hard	18.01.2016	F	(United Kingdom) Andy Murray	2	6–1, 7–5, 7–6^{(7–3)}
22	2016 French Open	Clay	22.05.2016	R128	(Chinese Taipei) Yen-Hsun Lu	95	6–4, 6–1, 6–1
23	2016 French Open	Clay	22.05.2016	R64	(Belgium) Steve Darcis	161	7–5, 6–3, 6–4
24	2016 French Open	Clay	22.05.2016	R32	(United Kingdom) Aljaž Bedene	66	6–2, 6–3, 6–3
25	2016 French Open	Clay	22.05.2016	R16	(Spain) Roberto Bautista Agut (2)	16	3–6, 6–4, 6–1, 7–5
26	2016 French Open	Clay	22.05.2016	QF	(Czech Republic) Tomáš Berdych	8	6–3, 7–5, 6–3
27	2016 French Open	Clay	22.05.2016	SF	(Austria) Dominic Thiem	15	6–2, 6–1, 6–4
28	2016 French Open	Clay	22.05.2016	F	(United Kingdom) Andy Murray (2)	2	3–6, 6–1, 6–2, 6–4
29	2016 Wimbledon	Grass	27.06.2016	R128	(United Kingdom) James Ward	177	6–0, 7–6^{(7–3)}, 6–4
30	2016 Wimbledon	Grass	27.06.2016	R64	(France) Adrian Mannarino	55	6–4, 6–3, 7–6^{(7–5)}
/	2016 Wimbledon	Grass	27.06.2016	R32	(United States) Sam Querrey	41	6–7^{(6–8)}, 1–6, 6–3, 6–7^{(5–7)}

=== 28–win streak in China 2012–14 ===
No.	Tournament	Tier	Surface	Date	Round	Opponent	Rank	Score
/	Shanghai Masters	ATP 1000	Hard	09.10.2010	SF	(Switzerland) Roger Federer	3	5–7, 4–6
1	China Open	ATP 500	Hard	01.10.2012	R32	(Germany) Michael Berrer	123	6–1, 6–7^{(3–7)}, 6–2
2	China Open	ATP 500	Hard	01.10.2012	R16	(Argentina) Carlos Berlocq	50	6–1, 6–3
3	China Open	ATP 500	Hard	01.10.2012	QF	(Austria) Jürgen Melzer	37	6–1, 6–2
4	China Open	ATP 500	Hard	01.10.2012	SF	(Germany) Florian Mayer	29	6–1, 6–4
5	China Open	ATP 500	Hard	01.10.2012	F	(France) Jo-Wilfried Tsonga	7	7–6^{(7–4)}, 6–2
6	Shanghai Masters	ATP 1000	Hard	08.10.2012	R32	(Bulgaria) Grigor Dimitrov	56	6–3, 6–2
7	Shanghai Masters	ATP 1000	Hard	08.10.2012	R16	(Spain) Feliciano López	29	6–3, 6–3
8	Shanghai Masters	ATP 1000	Hard	08.10.2012	QF	(Germany) Tommy Haas	21	6–3, 6–3
9	Shanghai Masters	ATP 1000	Hard	08.10.2012	SF	(Czech Republic) Tomáš Berdych	7	6–3, 6–4
10	Shanghai Masters	ATP 1000	Hard	08.10.2012	F	(United Kingdom) Andy Murray	3	5–7, 7–6^{(13–11)}, 6–3
11	China Open	ATP 500	Hard	28.09.2013	R32	(Czech Republic) Lukáš Rosol	46	6–0, 6–3
12	China Open	ATP 500	Hard	28.09.2013	R16	(Spain) Fernando Verdasco	31	7–5, 2–6, 6–2
13	China Open	ATP 500	Hard	28.09.2013	QF	(United States) Sam Querrey	30	6–1, 6–2
14	China Open	ATP 500	Hard	28.09.2013	SF	(France) Richard Gasquet	10	6–4, 6–2
15	China Open	ATP 500	Hard	28.09.2013	F	(Spain) Rafael Nadal	2	6–3, 6–4
16	Shanghai Masters	ATP 1000	Hard	06.10.2013	R32	(Spain) Marcel Granollers	36	6–2, 6–0
17	Shanghai Masters	ATP 1000	Hard	06.10.2013	R16	(Italy) Fabio Fognini	17	6–3, 6–3
18	Shanghai Masters	ATP 1000	Hard	06.10.2013	QF	(France) Gaël Monfils	42	6–7^{(4–7)}, 6–2, 6–4
19	Shanghai Masters	ATP 1000	Hard	06.10.2013	SF	(France) Jo-Wilfried Tsonga (2)	9	6–2, 7–5
20	Shanghai Masters	ATP 1000	Hard	06.10.2013	F	(Argentina) Juan Martín del Potro	5	6–1, 3–6, 7–6^{(7–3)}
21	China Open	ATP 500	Hard	27.09.2014	R32	(Spain) Guillermo García López	38	6–2, 6–1
22	China Open	ATP 500	Hard	27.09.2014	R16	(Canada) Vasek Pospisil	41	6–3, 7–5
23	China Open	ATP 500	Hard	27.09.2014	QF	(Bulgaria) Grigor Dimitrov (2)	10	6–2, 6–4
24	China Open	ATP 500	Hard	27.09.2014	SF	(United Kingdom) Andy Murray (2)	11	6–3, 6–4
25	China Open	ATP 500	Hard	27.09.2014	F	(Czech Republic) Tomáš Berdych (2)	6	6–0, 6–2
26	Shanghai Masters	ATP 1000	Hard	05.10.2014	R32	(Austria) Dominic Thiem	39	6–3, 6–4
27	Shanghai Masters	ATP 1000	Hard	05.10.2014	R16	(Kazakhstan) Mikhail Kukushkin	85	6–3, 4–6, 6–4
28	Shanghai Masters	ATP 1000	Hard	05.10.2014	QF	(Spain) David Ferrer	5	6–4, 6–2
/	Shanghai Masters	ATP 1000	Hard	05.10.2014	SF	(Switzerland) Roger Federer	3	4–6, 4–6

== ATP Tour career earnings ==
Year	Majors	ATP wins	Total wins	Earnings ($)	Money list rank
2003	0	0	0	2,704	937
2004	0	0	0	40,790	292
2005	0	0	0	202,416	114
2006	0	2	2	644,940	28
2007	0	5	5	3,927,700	3
2008	1	3	4	5,689,078	3
2009	0	5	5	5,476,472	3
2010	0	2	2	4,278,856	3
2011	3	7	10	12,619,803	1
2012	1	5	6	12,803,739	1
2013	1	6	7	12,447,947	2
2014	1	6	7	14,269,463	1
2015	3	8	11	21,646,145	1
2016	2	5	7	14,138,824	2
2017	0	2	2	2,116,524	14
2018	2	2	4	15,967,184	1
2019	2	3	5	13,372,355	2
2020	1	3	4	6,511,233	1
2021	3	2	5	9,100,547	1
2022	1	4	5	9,934,582	2
2023	3	4	7	15,952,044	1
2024	0	1	1	4,421,915	8
2025	0	2	2	5,140,175	9
2026	0	1	1	4,070,490	9
Career*	24	78	102	$197,006,276	1

* Statistics correct as of 9 November 2026.

== Historic achievements ==
The following is a list of some of Djokovic's most significant achievements (stand-alone records in bold) in singles.

- Big Titles won (**72**)
- Grand Slam titles (**24**)
- Masters 1000 titles (**40**)
- ATP Finals titles (**7**)
- Total weeks ranked as ATP world No.1 (**428**)
- Total weeks ranked in ATP top-2 (**599**)
- Total weeks ranked in ATP top-3 (**764**)
- Total weeks ranked in ATP top-4 (**829**)
- Total weeks ranked in ATP top-5 (**873**)
- Total weeks ranked in ATP top-6 (**906**)
- Total weeks ranked in ATP top-7 (**946**)
- Total weeks ranked in ATP top-8 (**954**)
- Different years ranked as ATP No. 1 (**13**)
- Ranking points as ATP No.1 (**16,950**)
- ATP Year-end No.1 finishes (**8**)
- Victories over ATP top-10 players (**269**)
- Career prize earnings (**$197m**)
- Winning head-to-head record against Big Three rivals (Federer and Nadal)
- Won all 4 Grand Slam tournament titles at least thrice (**Triple Career Grand Slam**).
- Won all 9 Masters 1000 titles at least twice (**Double Career Golden Slam**).
- Won at **95+** matches at each of the 4 majors.
- Won at **100+** matches at 3 majors.
- Made **7+** finals at each of the 4 majors.
- Made **10+** finals at each of the 3 majors.

== Coaches ==
Current coaches in bold:

- (Federal Republic of Yugoslavia) Jelena Genčić (1993–1999)
- (Croatia) Nikola Pilić (1999–2003)
- (Serbia and Montenegro) Dejan Petrović (2004–2005)
- (Italy) Riccardo Piatti (2005–2006)
- (Slovakia) Marián Vajda (2006–2017, 2018–2022)
- (Israel) Ronen Bega (2006–2009), fitness coach
- (Australia) Mark Woodforde (2007)
- (United States) Todd Martin (2009–2010)
- (Austria) **Gebhard Gritsch** (2009–17, 2018–2019, 2024–present), fitness coach
- (Serbia) Dušan Vemić (2011–2013, 2025)
- (Germany) Boris Becker (2013–2016)
- (United States) Andre Agassi (2017–2018)
- (Croatia) Mario Ančić (2017)
- (Italy) Marco Panichi (2017–2018, 2019–2024), fitness coach
- (Czech Republic) Radek Štěpánek (2018)
- (Croatia) Goran Ivanišević (2019–2024)
- (United Kingdom) Andy Murray (2024–2025)
- (Serbia) **Boris Bošnjaković** (2025–present)
- (Serbia) **Viktor Troicki** (2026–present)

== Career milestone wins ==
- Note: **Bold** indicates that he went on to win the tournament.

=== Centennial match wins ===
#	Date	Age	Player	Event	Surface	Rd	Score
1.	Apr 2004	16 years, 11 months	(Latvia) Jānis Skroderis	Davis Cup, Serbia and Montenegro	Carpet (i)	1R	6–2, 6–2
100.	Jul 2007	20 years, 2 months	(Spain) Pablo Andújar	Croatia Open, Croatia	Clay	1R	6–1, 6–3
200.	Mar 2009	21 years, 10 months	(Argentina) Martín Vassallo Argüello	Indian Wells Open, United States	Hard	2R	7–5, 6–4
300.	Aug 2010	23 years, 2 months	(Serbia) Viktor Troicki	Cincinnati Open, United States	Hard	2R	6–3, 7–5
400.	Jan 2012	24 years, 8 months	(United Kingdom) Andy Murray	**Australian Open**, Australia	Hard	SF	6–3, 3–6, 6–7^{(4–7)}, 6–1, 7–5
500.	Jun 2013	26 years	(Bulgaria) Grigor Dimitrov	French Open, France	Clay	3R	6–2, 6–2, 6–3
600.	Nov 2014	27 years, 5 months	(Canada) Milos Raonic	**Paris Masters**, France	Hard (i)	F	6–2, 6–3
700.	Feb 2016	28 years, 9 months	(Tunisia) Malek Jaziri	Dubai Tennis Championships, UAE	Hard	2R	6–1, 6–2
800.	Jun 2018	31 years, 1 month	(France) Adrian Mannarino	Queen's Club Championships, United Kingdom	Grass	QF	7–5, 6–1
900.	Jan 2020	32 years, 8 months	(Germany) Jan-Lennard Struff	**Australian Open**, Australia	Hard	1R	7–6^{(7–5)}, 6–2, 2–6, 6–1
1000.	May 2022	34 years, 11 months	(Norway) Casper Ruud	**Italian Open**, Italy	Clay	SF	6–4, 6–3
1100.	May 2024	37 years	(Germany) Yannick Hanfmann	Geneva Open, Switzerland	Clay	2R	6–3, 6–3

=== Milestone Grand Slam match wins ===
#	Date	Age	Player	Event	Surface	Rd	Score
1.	May 2005	18 years	(United States) Robby Ginepri	French Open, France	Clay	1R	6–0, 6–0, 6–3
100.	June 2011	24 years, 1 month	(France) Michaël Llodra	**Wimbledon**, United Kingdom	Grass	4R	6–3, 6–3, 6–3
200.	July 2015	28 years, 1 month	(Switzerland) Roger Federer	**Wimbledon**, United Kingdom	Grass	F	7–6^{(7–1)}, 6–7^{(10–12)}, 6–4, 6–3
300.	February 2021	33 years, 9 months	(Canada) Milos Raonic	**Australian Open**, Australia	Hard	4R	7–6^{(7–4)}, 4–6, 6–1, 6–4
400.	January 2026	38 years, 8 months	(Netherlands) Botic van de Zandschulp	Australian Open, Australia	Hard	3R	6–3, 6–4, 7–6^{(7–4)}

=== Milestone hard court match wins ===
#	Date	Age	Player	Event	Surface	Rd	Score
1.	August 2005	18 years, 3 month	(France) Gaël Monfils	US Open, United States	Hard	1R	7–5, 4–6, 7–6^{(7–5)}, 0–6, 7–5
100.	October 2008	21 years, 5 month	(Romania) Victor Hănescu	Madrid Open, Spain	Hard (i)	2R	6–7^{(8–10)}, 7–6^{(8–6)}, 3–1 Ret.
200.	December 2010	23 years, 7 month	(France) Gilles Simon	**Davis Cup**, Serbia	Hard (i)	RR	6–3, 6–1, 7–5
300.	January 2013	25 years, 8 month	(Czech Republic) Radek Štěpánek	**Australian Open**, Australia	Hard	3R	6–4, 6–3, 7–5
400.	February 2015	27 years, 9 month	(Canada) Vasek Pospisil	Dubai Tennis Championships, UAE	Hard	1R	6–4, 6–4
500.	January 2017	29 years, 8 month	(Spain) Fernando Verdasco	**Qatar Open**, Qatar	Hard	SF	4–6, 7–6^{(9–7)}, 6–3
600.	August 2020	33 years, 3 month	(Germany) Jan-Lennard Struff	US Open, United States	Hard	3R	6–3, 6–3, 6–1
700.	January 2024	36 years, 8 month	(United States) Taylor Fritz	Australian Open, Australia	Hard	QF	7–6^{(7–3)}, 4–6, 6–2, 6–3

=== Milestone clay court match wins ===
#	Date	Age	Player	Event	Surface	Rd	Score
1.	September 2004	17 years, 4 months	(France) Arnaud Clément	Bucharest Open, Romania	Clay	1R	2–6, 6–4, 6–4
50.	May 2008	21 years	(Spain) Miguel Ángel López Jaén	French Open, France	Clay	2R	6–1, 6–1, 6–3
100.	April 2012	24 years, 11 months	(Italy) Andreas Seppi	Monte-Carlo Masters, France	Clay	2R	6–1, 6–4
150.	May 2015	28 years	(Spain) Nicolás Almagro	**Italian Open**, Italy	Clay	2R	6–1, 6–7^{(5–7)}, 6–3
200.	April 2019	31 years, 11 months	(Germany) Philipp Kohlschreiber	Monte-Carlo Masters, France	Clay	2R	6–3, 4–6, 6–4
250.	May 2022	34 years, 11 months	(Switzerland) Stan Wawrinka	**Italian Open**, Italy	Clay	3R	6–2, 6–2

=== Milestone grass court match wins ===
#	Date	Age	Player	Event	Surface	Rd	Score
1.	June 2005	18 years, 1 month	(Argentina) Juan Mónaco	Wimbledon, United Kingdom	Grass	1R	6–3, 7–6^{(7–5)}, 6–3
50.	June 2013	26 years, 1 month	(France) Jérémy Chardy	Wimbledon, United Kingdom	Grass	3R	6–3, 6–2, 6–2
100.	June 2021	34 years, 1 month	(Hungary) Márton Fucsovics	**Wimbledon**, United Kingdom	Grass	QF	6–3, 6–4, 6–4

== National representation ==
=== Davis Cup ===
==== Titles: 1 ====
Edition	(Serbia) Serbian Team	Rounds / Opponents
2010 Davis Cup	Novak Djokovic; Viktor Troicki; Janko Tipsarević; Nenad Zimonjić	1R: SRB 3–2 USA; QF: CRO 1–4 SRB; SF: SRB 3–2 CZE; F: SRB 3–2 FRA

==== Participations: 62 (46–16) ====
Group membership World Group (23–7) WG play-off (5–1) Group I (7–2) Group II (1–0) Finals (10–6)	Matches by Surface Hard (32–12) Clay (11–4) Grass (0–0) Carpet (3–0)	Matches by Type Singles (41–8) Doubles (5–8)	Matches by setting Indoors (44–12) Outdoors (2–4)

- ▲ ▼ indicates the outcome of the Davis Cup match followed by the score, date, place of event, the zonal classification and its phase, and the court surface.

Rubber outcome	No.	Rubber	Match type (partner if any)	Opponent nation	Opponent player(s)	Score
▲5–0; 9–11 April 2004; Tennis Club Gemax, Belgrade, Serbia and Montenegro; Europe/Africa first round; carpet surface
Victory	1.	V	Singles (dead rubber)	Latvia	Jānis Skroderis	6–2, 6–2
▲5–0; 4–6 March 2005; Novosadski Sajam Hala 1, Novi Sad, Serbia and Montenegro; Europe/Africa first round; clay surface
Victory	2.	I	Singles	Zimbabwe	Genius Chidzikwe	6–4, 6–0, 6–4
Victory	3.	V	Singles (dead rubber)	Zimbabwe	Pfungwa Mahefu	6–1, 6–2
▼2–3; 19 April – 1 May 2005; Tennis Club Gemax, Belgrade, Serbia and Montenegro; Europe/Africa Quarter-final; clay surface
Defeat	4.	II	Singles	Belgium	Olivier Rochus	6–1, 5–7, 7–6^{(7–3)}, 1–6, 3–6
Defeat	5.	V	Singles (decider)	Belgium	Kristof Vliegen	3–6, 3–6, 6–3, 2–6
▲4–1; 10–12 February 2006; Canada Stadium, Ramat HaSharon, Israel; Europe/Africa first round; hard surface
Victory	6.	II	Singles	Israel	Noam Okun	7–6^{(7–2)}, 7–6^{(8–6)}, 6–2
Victory	7.	IV	Singles	Israel	Dudi Sela	6–1, 6–2, 7–6^{(7–3)}
▲3–2; 7–9 April 2006; Braehead Arena, Glasgow, Great Britain; Europe/Africa Quarter-final; carpet surface
Victory	8.	II	Singles	(United Kingdom) Great Britain	Arvind Parmar	6–3, 6–2, 7–5
Victory	9.	IV	Singles	(United Kingdom) Great Britain	Greg Rusedski	6–3, 4–6, 6–3, 7–6^{(8–6)}
▼1–4; 22–24 September 2006; Geneva Palexpo, Geneva, Switzerland; World Group play-off; hard surface
Victory	10.	II	Singles	Switzerland	Stan Wawrinka	6–4, 3–6, 2–6, 7–6^{(7–3)}, 6–4
Defeat	11.	IV	Singles	Switzerland	Roger Federer	3–6, 2–6, 3–6
▲5–0; 6–8 April 2007; Sportski Centar Kovilovo, Belgrade, Serbia; Europe/Africa Quarter-final; clay surface
Victory	12.	I	Singles	(Georgia (country)) Georgia	Giorgi Chantouria	6–1, 5–0, ret.^{[a]}
▲4–1; 21–23 September 2007; Belgrade Arena, Belgrade, Serbia; World Group play-off; clay surface
Victory	13.	I	Singles	Australia	Peter Luczak	6–1, 6–4, 6–2
Victory	14.	III	Doubles (with Nenad Zimonjić)	Australia	Paul Hanley / Lleyton Hewitt	3–6, 6–4, 6–3, 6–2
Victory	15.	IV	Singles	Australia	Chris Guccione	6–3, 7–6^{(7–3)}, 7–6^{(7–5)}
▼2–3; 8–10 February 2008; Small Sports Arena Luzhniki, Moscow, Russia; World Group first round; hard surface
Victory	16.	III	Doubles (with Nenad Zimonjić)	Russia	Mikhail Youzhny / Dmitry Tursunov	6–3, 7–6^{(8–6)}, 7–6^{(7–5)}
Defeat	17.	IV	Singles	Russia	Nikolay Davydenko	6–4, 6–3, 4–6, 0–0, ret.^{[b]}
▲4–1; 19–21 September 2008; Sibamac Arena, Bratislava, Slovakia; World Group play-off; hard surface
Victory	18.	I	Singles	Slovakia	Dominik Hrbatý	6–2, 6–4, 6–3
▼1–4; 6–8 March 2009; Parque Tematico Terra Mitica, Benidorm, Spain; World Group first round; clay surface
Defeat	19.	I	Singles	Spain	David Ferrer	3–6, 3–6, 6–7^{(4–7)}
Defeat	20.	IV	Singles	Spain	Rafael Nadal	4–6, 4–6, 1–6
▲3–2; 5–7 March 2010; Belgrade Arena, Belgrade, Serbia; World Group first round; clay surface
Victory	21.	II	Singles	(United States) USA	Sam Querrey	6–2, 7–6^{(7–4)}, 2–6, 6–3
Victory	22.	IV	Singles	(United States) USA	John Isner	7–5, 3–6, 6–3, 6–7,^{(6–8)}, 6–4
▲4–1; 9–11 July 2010; Spaladium Arena, Split, Croatia; World Group quarter-final; hard surface
Victory	23.	I	Singles	Croatia	Ivan Ljubičić	7–6^{(7–3)}, 6–4, 6–1
Victory	24.	IV	Singles	Croatia	Marin Čilić	6–3, 6–3, 6–2
▲3–2; 17–19 September 2010; Belgrade Arena, Belgrade, Serbia; World Group semi-final; hard surface
Defeat	25.	III	Doubles (with Nenad Zimonjić)	Czech Republic	Tomáš Berdych / Radek Štěpánek	6–3, 1–6, 4–6, 1–6
Victory	26.	IV	Singles	Czech Republic	Tomáš Berdych	4–6, 6–3, 6–2, 6–4
▲3–2; 3–5 December 2010; Belgrade Arena, Belgrade, Serbia; World Group final; hard surface
Victory	27.	II	Singles	France	Gilles Simon	6–3, 6–1, 7–5
Victory	28.	IV	Singles	France	Gaël Monfils	6–2, 6–2, 6–4
▲4–1; 8–10 July 2011; Halmstad Arena, Halmstad, Sweden; World Group quarter-final; hard surface
Defeat	29.	III	Doubles (with Nenad Zimonjić)	Sweden	Simon Aspelin / Robert Lindstedt	4–6, 6–7^{(5–7)}, 5–7
▼2–3; 16–18 September 2011; Belgrade Arena, Belgrade, Serbia; World Group semi-final; hard surface
Defeat	30.	IV	Singles	Argentina	Juan Martín del Potro	6–7^{(5–7)}, 0–3, ret.
▲3–2; 1–3 February 2013; Spiroudome, Charleroi, Belgium; World Group first round; clay surface
Victory	31.	II	Singles	Belgium	Olivier Rochus	6–3, 6–2, 6–3
▲3–1; 5–7 April 2013; Boise, United States; World Group quarter-final; hard surface
Victory	32.	I	Singles	(United States) USA	John Isner	7–6^{(7–5)}, 6–2, 7–5
Victory	33.	IV	Singles	(United States) USA	Sam Querrey	7–5, 6–7^{(4–7)}, 6–1, 6–0
▲3–2; 13–15 September 2013; Kombank Arena, Belgrade, Serbia; World Group semi-final; clay surface
Victory	34.	I	Singles	Canada	Vasek Pospisil	6–2, 6–0, 6–4
Victory	35.	IV	Singles	Canada	Milos Raonic	7–6^{(7–1)}, 6–2, 6–2
▼2–3; 15–17 November 2013; Kombank Arena, Belgrade, Serbia; World Group final; hard surface
Victory	36.	I	Singles	Czech Republic	Radek Štěpánek	7–5, 6–1, 6–4
Victory	37.	IV	Singles	Czech Republic	Tomáš Berdych	6–4, 7–6^{(7–5)}, 6–2
▲5–0; 6–8 March 2015; Kraljevo Sports Hall, Kraljevo, Serbia; World Group first round; hard surface
Victory	38.	I	Singles	Croatia	Mate Delić	6–3, 6–2, 6–4
Victory	39.	III	Doubles (with Nenad Zimonjić)	Croatia	Marin Draganja / Franko Škugor	6–3, 6–4, 6–1
▲3–2; 4–6 March 2016; Hall Aleksandar Nikolić, Belgrade, Serbia; World Group first round; hard surface
Victory	40.	I	Singles	Kazakhstan	Aleksandr Nedovyesov	6–1, 6–2, 6–3
Defeat	41.	III	Doubles (with Nenad Zimonjić)	Kazakhstan	Andrey Golubev / Aleksandr Nedovyesov	3–6, 6–7^{(3–7)}, 5–7
Victory	42.	IV	Singles	Kazakhstan	Mikhail Kukushkin	6–7^{(6–8)}, 7–6^{(7–3)}, 4–6, 6–3, 6–2
▲4–1; 3–5 February 2017; Čair Sports Center, Niš, Serbia; World Group first round; hard surface
Victory	43.	II	Singles	Russia	Daniil Medvedev	3–6, 6–4, 6–1, 1–0, ret.
▲4–1; 6–8 April 2017; Hall Aleksandar Nikolić, Belgrade, Serbia; World Group quarter-final; hard surface
Victory	44.	I	Singles	Spain	Albert Ramos Viñolas	6–3, 6–4, 6–2
▼7–2; 18–24 November 2019; Estadio Manolo Santana, Madrid, Spain; 2019 Davis Cup Finals; hard surface
Victory	45.	F	Singles	Japan	Yoshihito Nishioka	6–1, 6–2
Victory	46.	F	Singles	France	Benoît Paire	6–3, 6–3
Victory	47.	F	Singles	Russia	Karen Khachanov	6–3, 6–3
Defeat	48.	F	Doubles (with Viktor Troicki)	Russia	Karen Khachanov / Andrey Rublev	4–6, 6–4, 6–7^{(8–10)}
▲4–2; 26–28 November 2021; Olympiahalle, Innsbruck, Austria; 2021 Davis Cup Finals group round; hard surface
Victory	49.	F	Singles	Austria	Dennis Novak	6–3, 6–2
Victory	50.	F	Singles	Germany	Jan-Lennard Struff	6–2, 6–4
Defeat	51.	F	Doubles (with Nikola Ćaćić)	Germany	Kevin Krawietz / Tim Pütz	6–7^{(5–7)}, 6–3, 6–7^{(5–7)}
▼3–3; 1–5 December 2021; Caja Mágica, Madrid, Spain; 2021 Davis Cup Finals; hard surface
Victory	52.	F	Singles	Kazakhstan	Alexander Bublik	6–3, 6–4
Victory	53.	F	Doubles (with Nikola Ćaćić)	Kazakhstan	Alexander Bublik / Aleksandr Nedovyesov	6–2, 2–6, 6–3
Victory	54.	F	Singles	Croatia	Marin Čilić	6–4, 6–2
Defeat	55.	F	Doubles (with Filip Krajinović)	Croatia	Nikola Mektić / Mate Pavić	5–7, 1–6
▲2–1; 12–16 September 2023; Pavelló Municipal Font de Sant Lluís, Valencia, Spain; 2023 Davis Cup Group stage; hard surface
Victory	56.	F	Singles	Spain	Alejandro Davidovich Fokina	6–3, 6–4
Defeat	57.	F	Doubles (with Nikola Ćaćić)	Czech Republic	Tomáš Macháč / Adam Pavlásek	5–7, 7–6^{(9–7)}, [3–10]
▼1–1; 21–26 November 2023; Martin Carpena Arena, Málaga, Spain; 2023 Davis Cup Knockout stage; hard surface
Victory	58.	F	Singles	(United Kingdom) Great Britain	Cameron Norrie	6–4, 6–4
Defeat	59.	F	Singles	Italy	Jannik Sinner	2–6, 6–2, 5–7
Defeat	60.	F	Doubles (with Miomir Kecmanović)	Italy	Jannik Sinner / Lorenzo Sonego	3–6, 4–6
▲3–1; 14–15 September 2024; Aleksandar Nikolić Hall, Belgrade, Serbia; World Group first round; hard surface
Victory	61.	I	Singles	Greece	Ioannis Xilas	6–0, 6–1
Victory	62.	I	Doubles (with Hamad Medjedovic)	Greece	Aristotelis Thanos / Petros Tsitsipas	6–3, 3–6, 6–3

- **^{a}** Chantouria gave up the opening rubber because of a calf injury.
- **^{b}** Djokovic withdrew from the rubber due to flu symptoms he was suffering the whole week. He wasn't scheduled to play but after Janko Tipsarević had fallen out of the team suffering from a stomach bug and an ankle injury team captain Bogdan Obradović chose to substitute Djokovic.

=== ATP Cup ===
==== Titles: 1 ====
Edition	(Serbia) Serbian Team	Rounds / Opponents
2020 ATP Cup	Novak Djokovic; Viktor Troicki; Dušan Lajović; Nikola Milojević; Nikola Ćaćić	RR: SRB 3–0 RSA; RR: SRB 2–1 FRA; RR: SRB 2–1 CHI; QF: SRB 3–0 CAN; SF: SRB 3–0 RUS; F: SRB 2–1 ESP

==== Participations: 12 (11–1) ====
Group membership ATP Cup (11–1)	Matches by Surface Hard (11–1)	Matches by Type Singles (8–0) Doubles (3–1)	Matches by setting Outdoors (11–1) Indoors (0–0)

Outcome	No.	Surface	Match type (partner)	Opponent nation	Opponent player(s)	Score
**2020**
3–9 January; Pat Rafter Arena, Brisbane, Australia
Victory	1.	Hard	Singles	South Africa	(South Africa) Kevin Anderson	7–6^{(7–5)}, 7–6^{(8–6)}
Victory	2.	Hard	Singles	France	(France) Gaël Monfils	6–3, 6–2
Victory	3.	Hard	Doubles (with Viktor Troicki)	France	(France) Nicolas Mahut / Édouard Roger-Vasselin	6–3, 6–7^{(5–7)}, [10–3]
Victory	4.	Hard	Singles	Chile	(Chile) Cristian Garín	6–3, 6–3
10–12 January; Ken Rosewall Arena, Sydney, Australia
Victory	5.	Hard	Singles	Canada	(Canada) Denis Shapovalov	4–6, 6–1, 7–6^{(7–4)}
Victory	6.	Hard	Singles	Russia	(Russia) Daniil Medvedev	6–1, 5–7, 6–4
Victory	7.	Hard	Singles	Spain	(Spain) Rafael Nadal	6–2, 7–6^{(7–4)}
Victory	8.	Hard	Doubles (with Viktor Troicki)	Spain	(Spain) Pablo Carreño Busta / Feliciano López	6–3, 6–4
**2021**
2–7 February; Melbourne Park, Melbourne, Australia
Victory	9.	Hard	Singles	Canada	(Canada) Denis Shapovalov	7–5, 7–5
Victory	10.	Hard	Doubles (with Filip Krajinović)	Canada	(Canada) Milos Raonic / Denis Shapovalov	7–5, 7–6^{(7–4)}
Victory	11.	Hard	Singles	Germany	(Germany) Alexander Zverev	6–7^{(3–7)}, 6–2, 7–5
Defeat	12.	Hard	Doubles (with Nikola Ćaćić)	Germany	(Germany) Jan-Lennard Struff / Alexander Zverev	6–7^{(4–7)}, 7–5, [7–10]

=== United Cup ===
==== Participations: 4 (3–1) ====
Group membership United Cup (3–1)	Matches by Surface Hard (3–1)	Matches by Type Singles (2–1) Mixed doubles (1–0)	Matches by setting Outdoors (3–1) Indoors (0–0)

Outcome	No.	Surface	Match type (partner)	Opponent nation	Opponent player(s)	Score
**2024**
29 December–7 January; RAC Arena, Perth, Australia
Victory	1.	Hard	Singles	China	(China) Zhang Zhizhen	6–3, 6–2
Victory	2.	Hard	Mixed doubles (with Olga Danilović)	China	(China) Zheng Qinwen / Zhang Zhizhen	6–4, 1–6, [10–6]
Victory	3.	Hard	Singles	Czech Republic	(Czech Republic) Jiří Lehečka	6–1, 6–7^{(2–7)}, 6–1
Defeat	4.	Hard	Singles	Australia	(Australia) Alex de Minaur	4–6, 4–6

== Team competitions finals ==
Result	Date	Tournament	Surface	Partners	Opponent	Score
Loss	Jan 2008	Hopman Cup, Australia	Hard	(Serbia) Jelena Janković	(United States) Serena Williams (United States) Mardy Fish	1–2
Win	Dec 2010	Davis Cup, Serbia	Hard (i)	(Serbia) Nenad Zimonjić (Serbia) Janko Tipsarević (Serbia) Viktor Troicki	(France) Gaël Monfils (France) Michaël Llodra (France) Arnaud Clément (France) Gilles Simon	3–2
Loss	Jan 2013	Hopman Cup, Australia	Hard	(Serbia) Ana Ivanovic	(Spain) Anabel Medina Garrigues (Spain) Fernando Verdasco	1–2
Loss	Nov 2013	Davis Cup, Serbia	Hard (i)	(Serbia) Nenad Zimonjić (Serbia) Dušan Lajović (Serbia) Ilija Bozoljac	(Czech Republic) Tomáš Berdych (Czech Republic) Radek Štěpánek (Czech Republic) Lukáš Rosol (Czech Republic) Jan Hájek	2–3
Win	Sep 2018	Laver Cup, United States	Hard (i)	Team Europe; Roger Federer; Alexander Zverev; Grigor Dimitrov; David Goffin; Kyle Edmund	Team World; Kevin Anderson; John Isner; Diego Schwartzman; Jack Sock; Nick Kyrgios; Frances Tiafoe	13–8
Win	Jan 2020	ATP Cup, Australia	Hard	(Serbia) Dušan Lajović (Serbia) Nikola Milojević (Serbia) Viktor Troicki (Serbia) Nikola Ćaćić	(Spain) Rafael Nadal (Spain) Roberto Bautista Agut (Spain) Pablo Carreño Busta (Spain) Albert Ramos Viñolas (Spain) Feliciano López	2–1
Loss	Sep 2022	Laver Cup, United Kingdom	Hard (i)	Team Europe; Casper Ruud; Rafael Nadal; Stefanos Tsitsipas; Roger Federer; Andy Murray; Matteo Berrettini; Cameron Norrie	Team World; Taylor Fritz; Félix Auger-Aliassime; Diego Schwartzman; Frances Tiafoe; Alex de Minaur; Jack Sock	8–13

== Exhibition matches ==
=== Singles ===
Result	Date	Tournament	Surface	Opponent	Score
Win	Jan 2010	AAMI Classic, Kooyong, Australia	Hard	(Germany) Tommy Haas	6–2, 6–3
Loss	Jan 2010	AAMI Classic, Kooyong, Australia	Hard	(Spain) Fernando Verdasco	1–6, 2–6
Loss	Jan 2010	AAMI Classic, Kooyong, Australia	Hard	(Australia) Bernard Tomic	4–6, 6–3, 5–7
NR	Jan 2010	AAMI Classic, Kooyong, Australia	Hard	(Argentina) Juan Martín del Potro	walkover
Win	Oct 2010	Hyundai Card Super Match, Seoul, South Korea	Hard (i)	(United States) Andy Roddick	6–2, 6–4
Loss	Mar 2011	Encuentro Bancolombia, Bogotá, Colombia	Hard (i)	(Spain) Rafael Nadal	6–7^{(5–7)}, 3–6
Win	Dec 2011	World Tennis Championship, UAE	Hard	(France) Gaël Monfils	6–2, 4–6, 6–2
Win	Dec 2011	World Tennis Championship, UAE	Hard	(Switzerland) Roger Federer	6–2, 6–1
Win	Dec 2011	World Tennis Championship, UAE	Hard	(Spain) David Ferrer	6–2, 6–1
Win	Jun 2012	Boodles Challenge, London, United Kingdom	Grass	(United Kingdom) Andy Murray	6–4, 6–4
Win	Sep 2012	New Taipei City, Chinese Taipei	Hard	(Spain) Nicolás Almagro	7–5, 6–3
Loss	Nov 2012	Djokovic no Rio, Rio de Janeiro, Brazil	Clay	(Brazil) Gustavo Kuerten	6–7^{(9–11)}, 5–7
Win	Dec 2012	World Tennis Championship, UAE	Hard	(Spain) David Ferrer	6–7^{(4–7)}, 6–0, 6–3
Win	Dec 2012	World Tennis Championship, UAE	Hard	(Spain) Nicolás Almagro	6–7^{(4–7)}, 6–3, 6–4
Loss	Oct 2013	China Open Exhibition, Beijing, China	Hard	(China) Li Na	2–3
Win	Nov 2013	Copa Movistar, Santiago de Chile, Chile	Hard (i)	(Spain) Rafael Nadal	7–6^{(7–3)}, 6–4
Loss	Nov 2013	Buenos Aires, Argentina	Hard	(Spain) Rafael Nadal	4–6, 5–7
Win	Dec 2013	World Tennis Championship, UAE	Hard	(France) Jo-Wilfried Tsonga	7–6^{(7–5)}, 6–3
Win	Dec 2013	World Tennis Championship, UAE	Hard	(Spain) David Ferrer	7–5, 6–2
Win	Mar 2014	BNP Paribas Showdown, United States	Hard	(United Kingdom) Andy Murray	6–3, 7–6^{(7–2)}
Win	Nov 2014	ATP World Tour Finals, London, United Kingdom	Hard	(United Kingdom) Andy Murray	8–5
Win	Jan 2015	World Tennis Championship, UAE	Hard	(Switzerland) Stan Wawrinka	6–1, 6–2
NR	Jan 2015	World Tennis Championship, UAE	Hard	(United Kingdom) Andy Murray	walkover
Win	Oct 2015	Back to Thailand, Bangkok, Thailand	Hard (i)	(Spain) Rafael Nadal	6–4, 6–2
Win	Sep 2016	Djokovic & Friends, Milan, Italy	Hard (i)	(Spain) Rafael Nadal	6–4, 6–4
Win	Jan 2018	Kooyong Classic, Kooyong, Australia	Hard	(Austria) Dominic Thiem	6–1, 6–4
Win	Dec 2018	World Tennis Championship, UAE	Hard	(Russia) Karen Khachanov	6–4, 6–2
Win	Dec 2018	World Tennis Championship, UAE	Hard	(South Africa) Kevin Anderson	4–6, 7–5, 7–5
Loss	Oct 2019	Nur-Sultan, Kazakhstan	Hard (i)	(Spain) Rafael Nadal	3–6, 6–3, [9–11]
Loss	Dec 2019	World Tennis Championship, UAE	Hard	(Greece) Stefanos Tsitsipas	6–3, 6–7^{(4–7)}, 4–6
Win	Dec 2019	World Tennis Championship, UAE	Hard	(Russia) Karen Khachanov	7–5, 6–3
Win	Jun 2020	Adria Tour, Belgrade, Serbia	Clay	(Serbia) Viktor Troicki	4–1, 4–1
Loss	Jun 2020	Adria Tour, Belgrade, Serbia	Clay	(Serbia) Filip Krajinović	4–2, 2–4, 1–4
Win	Jun 2020	Adria Tour, Belgrade, Serbia	Clay	(Germany) Alexander Zverev	4–0, 1–4, 4–2
Win	Jun 2020	Adria Tour, Zadar, Croatia	Clay	(Serbia) Peđa Krstin	4–3^{(7–1)}, 4–1
Win	Jun 2020	Adria Tour, Zadar, Croatia	Clay	(Croatia) Borna Ćorić	4–1, 4–3^{(7–1)}
Win	Jun 2020	Adria Tour, Zadar, Croatia	Clay	(Croatia) Nino Serdarušić	4–1, 4–3^{(7–3)}
NR	Jun 2020	Adria Tour, Zadar, Croatia	Clay	(Russia) Andrey Rublev	cancelled
Win	Jan 2021	A Day at The Drive, Adelaide, Australia	Hard	(Italy) Jannik Sinner	6–3
Win	Jun 2022	Giorgio Armani Tennis Classic, London, United Kingdom	Grass	(Canada) Félix Auger-Aliassime	6–2, 6–1
NR	Jun 2022	Giorgio Armani Tennis Classic, London, United Kingdom	Grass	(Australia) Alexei Popyrin	walkover
Loss	Dec 2022	World Tennis League, Dubai, UAE	Hard	(Germany) Alexander Zverev	3–6, 4–6
Win	Dec 2022	World Tennis League, Dubai, UAE	Hard	(Austria) Sebastian Ofner	6–7^{(5–7)}, 6–0, [10–7]
Loss	Jan 2023	The Arena Showdown, Melbourne, Australia	Hard	(Australia) Nick Kyrgios	3–4^{(3–5)}, 4–2, [9–10]
Win	Jun 2023	Giorgio Armani Tennis Classic, London, United Kingdom	Grass	(United States) Frances Tiafoe	6–3, 3–6, [10–7]
Loss	Dec 2023	Riyadh Season Tennis Cup, Riyadh, Saudi Arabia	Hard	(Spain) Carlos Alcaraz	6–4, 4–6, 4–6
Win	Jan 2024	Australian Open Opening Week, Melbourne, Australia	Hard	(Greece) Stefanos Tsitsipas	6–3
Win	Jun 2024	Giorgio Armani Tennis Classic, London, United Kingdom	Grass	(Russia) Daniil Medvedev	6–3, 6–4
Loss	Sep 2024	Grigor Dimitrov Foundation, Sofia, Bulgaria	Hard (i)	(Bulgaria) Grigor Dimitrov	4–6, 6–2, [6–10]
Loss	Oct 2024	2024 Six Kings Slam, Riyadh, Saudi Arabia	Hard (i)	(Italy) Jannik Sinner	2–6, 7–6^{(7–0)}, 4–6
Win	Oct 2024	2024 Six Kings Slam, Riyadh, Saudi Arabia	Hard (i)	(Spain) Rafael Nadal	6–2, 7–6^{(7–5)}
Loss	Dec 2024	El Último Desafío, Buenos Aires, Argentina	Hard	(Argentina) Juan Martín del Potro	4–6, 5–7
Win	Jan 2025	Australian Open Opening Week, Melbourne, Australia	Hard	(Germany) Alexander Zverev	7–6^{(8–6)}
Loss	Jun 2025	Giorgio Armani Tennis Classic, London, United Kingdom	Grass	(Russia) Karen Khachanov	6–7^{(4–7)}, 4–6
Loss	Oct 2025	2025 Six Kings Slam, Riyadh, Saudi Arabia	Hard (i)	(Italy) Jannik Sinner	4–6, 2–6
Loss	Oct 2025	2025 Six Kings Slam, Riyadh, Saudi Arabia	Hard (i)	(United States) Taylor Fritz	6–7^{(4–7)}, 0–0 Ret.
Win	Jan 2026	Australian Open Opening Week, Melbourne, Australia	Hard	(United States) Frances Tiafoe	6–3, 6–4
Win	Jun 2026	Giorgio Armani Tennis Classic, London, United Kingdom	Grass	(United States) Tommy Paul	6–3, 6–7^{(6–8)}, [7–5]
Pending	Dec 2026	2026 Six Kings Slam, Riyadh, Saudi Arabia	Hard (i)	TBD	

=== Doubles ===
Result	Date	Tournament	Surface	Partner	Opponents	Score
Win	Nov 2013	Buenos Aires, Argentina	Hard	(Spain) Rafael Nadal	(Argentina) David Nalbandian (Argentina) Juan Mónaco	6–4
Win	Aug 2024	New York City, United States	Hard	(United States) John McEnroe	(Spain) Carlos Alcaraz (United States) Andre Agassi	[10–8]

=== Mixed doubles ===
Result	Date	Tournament	Surface	Partner	Opponents	Score
Loss	Dec 2024	El Último Desafío, Buenos Aires, Argentina	Hard	(Argentina) Gisela Dulko	(Argentina) Gabriela Sabatini (Argentina) Juan Martín del Potro	1–2
Win	Jan 2025	Australian Open Opening Week, Melbourne, Australia	Hard	(China) Zheng Qinwen	Victoria Azarenka (United Kingdom) Andy Murray	4–3^{(5–4)}

=== Team competitions ===
Result	No.	Tournament	Surface	Team	Partners	Opponent team	Opponent players	Score
Loss	Jan 2010	Hit for Haiti; Melbourne, Australia	Hard	Team Blue	(Spain) Rafael Nadal (United States) Andy Roddick (Belgium) Kim Clijsters (Australia) Bernard Tomic (S)	Team Red	(Switzerland) Roger Federer (Australia) Lleyton Hewitt (United States) Serena Williams (Australia) Samantha Stosur (S)	6–7
Loss	Jan 2011	Rally for Relief 2, Melbourne, Australia	Hard	Team Gold	(Australia) Lleyton Hewitt (C) (Serbia) Ana Ivanovic (Belgium) Justine Henin (Switzerland) Roger Federer (Denmark) Caroline Wozniacki (Australia) Samantha Stosur (S)	Team Green	(Australia) Patrick Rafter (C) (Belgium) Kim Clijsters (United States) Andy Roddick (United Kingdom) Andy Murray (Belarus) Victoria Azarenka (Russia) Vera Zvonareva (Spain) Rafael Nadal (S)	43–44
Win	Jan 2020	AO Rally for Relief, Melbourne, Australia	Hard	Team Williams	(United States) Serena Williams (C) (Spain) Rafael Nadal (Austria) Dominic Thiem (Czech Republic) Petra Kvitová	Team Wozniacki	(Denmark) Caroline Wozniacki (C) (Germany) Alexander Zverev (Japan) Naomi Osaka (United States) Coco Gauff (Greece) Stefanos Tsitsipas	4–3^{(5–2)}
Loss	Dec 2022	World Tennis League; Dubai, UAE	Hard	Team Falcons	(Belarus) Aryna Sabalenka (Bulgaria) Grigor Dimitrov (Spain) Paula Badosa	Team Hawkes	(Kazakhstan) Elena Rybakina (Austria) Dominic Thiem (Germany) Alexander Zverev (Russia) Anastasia Pavlyuchenkova	27–35
Loss	Dec 2022	World Tennis League; Dubai, UAE	Hard	Team Falcons	(Belarus) Aryna Sabalenka (Bulgaria) Grigor Dimitrov (Spain) Paula Badosa	Team Kites	(Canada) Félix Auger-Aliassime (Poland) Iga Świątek (Denmark) Holger Rune (India) Sania Mirza (Austria) Sebastian Ofner (S) (Canada) Eugenie Bouchard	26–36

== See also ==
- List of career achievements by Novak Djokovic
- List of male singles tennis players
- Open Era tennis records – Men's singles
- All-time tennis records – Men's singles
- List of Grand Slam men's singles champions
- Chronological list of men's Grand Slam tennis champions
- List of Open Era Grand Slam champions by country
- List of ATP Big Titles singles champions
- List of tennis title leaders in the Open Era
- ATP Masters 1000 singles records and statistics
- List of ATP number 1 ranked singles tennis players
- Top ten ranked male tennis players
- ATP Finals appearances
- List of highest ranked tennis players per country
- Serbia at the Olympics
- Summer Olympics national flag bearers
- Awards of Olympic Committee of Serbia
- List of Olympic medalists in tennis
- Serbia Davis Cup team
- List of Serbia Davis Cup team representatives
- Serbia at the Hopman Cup
- Serbia ATP Cup team
- Sport in Serbia
- Big Three
- Big Four career statistics
