= 2008 French Open – Men's singles =

Tennis tournament

Men's singles
- 2008 French Open

Final
- Champion: (Spain) Rafael Nadal
- Runner-up: (Switzerland) Roger Federer
- Score: 6–1, 6–3, 6–0

Details
- Draw: 128
- Seeds: 32

Events
Singles	men	women		boys	girls
Doubles	men	women	mixed	boys	girls
WC Singles	men	women	quad
WC Doubles	men	women	quad
Legends	−45	45+	women
- French Open

Three-time defending champion Rafael Nadal defeated Roger Federer in a rematch of the two previous years' finals, 6–1, 6–3, 6–0 to win the men's singles tennis title at the 2008 French Open. It was his fourth French Open title and fourth major title overall. Nadal did not lose a set during the tournament (a feat he would repeat in 2010, 2017, and 2020). It marked the third consecutive year that Nadal defeated Federer in the French Open final, and the fourth consecutive year that Nadal defeated Federer at the French Open (extending back to the 2005 semifinals). On all four occasions that Nadal won the French Open, he defeated Federer while the latter was the world No. 1 player. This was Federer's worst loss at a major in his entire career; the last set marked the only bagel Federer sustained in a 21-year span. He was attempting to complete the career Grand Slam; he would achieve the feat the following year.

This tournament marked the final professional appearance of former world No. 1 and three-time champion Gustavo Kuerten; he lost to Paul-Henri Mathieu in the first round. It was also the last major for 2004 finalist and former world No. 3 Guillermo Coria; he lost in the first round to Tommy Robredo. It was also the final French Open appearance of former world No. 1 and 1998 champion Carlos Moyá, who lost to Eduardo Schwank in the first round.

== Seeds ==
1. (Switzerland) Roger Federer (final)
2. (Spain) Rafael Nadal (champion)
3. (Serbia) Novak Djokovic (semifinals)
4. (Russia) Nikolay Davydenko (third round)
5. (Spain) David Ferrer (quarterfinals)
6. (Argentina) David Nalbandian (second round)
7. (United States) James Blake (second round)
8. (France) ~~Richard Gasquet~~ (withdrew due to a knee injury)
9. (Switzerland) Stan Wawrinka (third round)
10. (United Kingdom) Andy Murray (third round)
11. (Czech Republic) Tomáš Berdych (second round)
12. (Spain) Tommy Robredo (third round)
13. (Argentina) Juan Mónaco (first round)
14. (France) ~~Jo-Wilfried Tsonga~~ (withdrew due to a knee injury)
15. (Russia) Mikhail Youzhny (third round)
16. (Spain) Carlos Moyá (first round)

17. (Cyprus) Marcos Baghdatis (first round)
18. (France) Paul-Henri Mathieu (fourth round)
19. (Spain) Nicolás Almagro (quarterfinals)
20. (Croatia) Ivo Karlović (first round)
21. (Czech Republic) Radek Štěpánek (fourth round)
22. (Spain) Fernando Verdasco (fourth round)
23. (Spain) Juan Carlos Ferrero (first round, retired)
24. (Chile) Fernando González (quarterfinals)
25. (Australia) Lleyton Hewitt (third round)
26. (Finland) Jarkko Nieminen (third round)
27. (Russia) Igor Andreev (second round)
28. (Croatia) Ivan Ljubičić (fourth round)
29. (Argentina) Guillermo Cañas (first round)
30. (Russia) Dmitry Tursunov (third round)
31. (Italy) Andreas Seppi (first round)
32. (Serbia) Janko Tipsarević (first round)

Click on the seed number of a player to go to their draw section.

== Draw ==
Key

- Q = Qualifier
- WC = Wild card
- LL = Lucky loser
- Alt = Alternate
- ITF = ITF entry
- PR = Protected ranking
- SR = Special ranking
- SE = Special exempt
- JE = Junior exempt
- JR = Junior Accelerator Programme entrant
- CO = College Accelerator Programme entrant
- NG = Next Gen Accelerator Program entrant
- w/o = Walkover
- r = Retired
- d = Defaulted

=== Finals ===
Quarterfinal
1	(Switzerland) Roger Federer	2	6	6	6
24	(Chile) Fernando González	6	2	3	4
(France) Gaël Monfils	6	3	6	6
5	(Spain) David Ferrer	3	6	3	1
(Latvia) Ernests Gulbis	5	6^{3}	5
3	(Serbia) Novak Djokovic	7	7^{7}	7
19	(Spain) Nicolás Almagro	1	1	1
2	(Spain) Rafael Nadal	6	6	6

Semifinals
1	(Switzerland) Roger Federer	6	5	6	7
(France) Gaël Monfils	2	7	3	5
3	(Serbia) Novak Djokovic	4	2	6^{3}
2	(Spain) Rafael Nadal	6	6	7^{7}

Final
1	(Switzerland) Roger Federer	1	3	0
2	(Spain) Rafael Nadal	6	6	6

=== Top half ===
==== Section 1 ====
First round
1	(Switzerland) R Federer	6	6	6
(United States) S Querrey	4	4	3
(Spain) A Montañés	7^{7}	7^{7}	7^{7}
(Belgium) K Vliegen	6^{5}	6^{2}	6^{3}
Q	(Romania) V Crivoi	3	3	7	4
Q	(Spain) D Marrero	6	6	5	6
(Croatia) M Ančić	6	7^{7}	6
31	(Italy) A Seppi	2	6^{1}	2
20	(Croatia) I Karlović	6	6^{4}	6^{6}	7	4
(Colombia) A Falla	3	7^{7}	7^{8}	5	6
(France) J Benneteau	6	6	3	3	6
(United States) V Spadea	4	4	6	6	3
(Germany) M Zverev	1	4	2
Q	(Chile) P Capdeville	6	6	6
(Sweden) R Söderling	6	6	6
13	(Argentina) J Mónaco	2	3	1

Second round
1	(Switzerland) R Federer	6^{5}	6	6	6
(Spain) A Montañés	7^{7}	1	0	4
Q	(Spain) D Marrero	6	0	3	2
(Croatia) M Ančić	4	6	6	6
(Colombia) A Falla	6	6^{6}	3	7^{7}	0
(France) J Benneteau	1	7^{8}	6	6^{4}	6
Q	(Chile) P Capdeville	3	2	4
(Sweden) R Söderling	6	6	6

Third round
1	(Switzerland) R Federer	6	6	6
(Croatia) M Ančić	3	4	2
(France) J Benneteau	1	7^{8}	6	6
(Sweden) R Söderling	6	6^{6}	0	1

Fourth round
1	(Switzerland) R Federer	6	7	7
(France) J Benneteau	4	5	5

==== Section 2 ====
First round
9	(Switzerland) S Wawrinka	6	6	6
(Germany) P Kohlschreiber	3	4	3
(Croatia) M Čilić	7^{8}	6	7^{7}
(Netherlands) R Haase	6^{6}	2	6^{4}
LL	(Spain) P Andújar	6^{6}	6	6	6
(Italy) F Volandri	7^{8}	2	3	3
(Uruguay) P Cuevas	3	3	1
24	(Chile) F González	6	6	6
27	(Russia) I Andreev	6	6^{3}	6	6
(Italy) P Starace	1	7^{7}	1	4
(United States) D Young	2	6	6^{4}	2
(United States) R Ginepri	6	3	7^{7}	6
(Israel) D Sela	6	2	6	4	3
(Romania) V Hănescu	4	6	4	6	6
(France) F Serra	6	6	6
LL	(Colombia) S Giraldo	4	3	2

Second round
9	(Switzerland) S Wawrinka	7^{7}	7^{7}	6
(Croatia) M Čilić	6^{3}	6^{4}	1
LL	(Spain) P Andújar	5	0	7^{7}	6^{3}
24	(Chile) F González	7	6	6^{4}	7^{7}
27	(Russia) I Andreev	6	2	6^{5}	2
(United States) R Ginepri	4	6	7^{7}	6
(Romania) V Hănescu	4	3	7^{7}	6^{5}
(France) F Serra	6	6	6^{5}	7^{7}

Third round
9	(Switzerland) S Wawrinka	7	6	4	4	4
24	(Chile) F González	5	3	6	6	6
(United States) R Ginepri	6	6	6
(France) F Serra	4	4	4

Fourth round
24	(Chile) F González	7^{7}	6	6
(United States) R Ginepri	6^{4}	3	1

==== Section 3 ====
First round
4	(Russia) N Davydenko	6	6	6
(Sweden) T Johansson	3	3	3
Q	(Monaco) J-R Lisnard	7^{7}	1	3	2
(Russia) M Safin	6^{5}	6	6	6
Q	(Argentina) D Junqueira	6	6	6
WC	(France) A Mannarino	1	2	2
WC	(France) É Prodon	5	6^{6}	6^{4}
28	(Croatia) I Ljubičić	7	7^{8}	7^{7}
23	(Spain) JC Ferrero	7^{7}	2^{r}
(Brazil) M Daniel	6^{5}	2
(Austria) J Melzer	6	6	6
(Australia) P Luczak	3	2	4
(France) G Monfils	7	6	6
(France) A Clément	5	3	1
Q	(United States) S Jenkins	4	7	3	0
LL	(Peru) L Horna	6	5	6	6

Second round
4	(Russia) N Davydenko	7^{7}	6	6
(Russia) M Safin	6^{4}	2	2
Q	(Argentina) D Junqueira	3	4	2
28	(Croatia) I Ljubičić	6	6	6
(Brazil) M Daniel	6	3	6	3	4
(Austria) J Melzer	4	6	2	6	6
(France) G Monfils	7^{7}	6	7
LL	(Peru) L Horna	6^{5}	4	5

Third round
4	(Russia) N Davydenko	6	6	3	2	4
28	(Croatia) I Ljubičić	4	2	6	6	6
(Austria) J Melzer	6	5	6	0	2
(France) G Monfils	4	7	4	6	6

Fourth round
28	(Croatia) I Ljubičić	6^{1}	6	3	2
(France) G Monfils	7^{7}	4	6	6

==== Section 4 ====
First round
12	(Spain) T Robredo	5	6	6	6
PR	(Argentina) G Coria	7	4	1	4
(Serbia) V Troicki	4	3	6	5
(France) M Gicquel	6	6	4	7
Q	(Netherlands) J Huta Galung	3	5	2
(Czech Republic) J Vaněk	6	7	6
(France) G Simon	2	4	1
21	(Czech Republic) R Štěpánek	6	6	6
25	(Australia) L Hewitt	6	6	6
(France) N Mahut	4	2	4
(Argentina) A Calleri	7^{8}	4	2	4
(United States) M Fish	6^{6}	6	6	6
(France) F Santoro	7^{7}	6	6
LL	(Russia) E Korolev	6^{3}	1	4
(Belgium) S Darcis	3	4	3
5	(Spain) D Ferrer	6	6	6

Second round
12	(Spain) T Robredo	6^{7}	6	6	6
(France) M Gicquel	7^{9}	4	4	4
(Czech Republic) J Vaněk	1	0	7^{9}	3
21	(Czech Republic) R Štěpánek	6	6	6^{7}	6
25	(Australia) L Hewitt	6	6	6
(United States) M Fish	4	3	2
(France) F Santoro	0	1	0
5	(Spain) D Ferrer	6	6	6

Third round
12	(Spain) T Robredo	3	2	1
21	(Czech Republic) R Štěpánek	6	6	6
25	(Australia) L Hewitt	2	6	6	3	4
5	(Spain) D Ferrer	6	3	3	6	6

Fourth round
21	(Czech Republic) R Štěpánek	6	2	6	3	3
5	(Spain) D Ferrer	4	6	1	6	6

=== Bottom half ===
==== Section 5 ====
First round
7	(United States) J Blake	6	6	7^{7}
(Germany) R Schüttler	4	1	6^{3}
Q	(Germany) S Greul	4	0	4
(Latvia) E Gulbis	6	6	6
(France) T Ascione	6^{2}	6	3	2
(United States) B Reynolds	7^{7}	4	6	6
(Ecuador) N Lapentti	6	4	6	7^{9}
32	(Serbia) J Tipsarević	4	6	1	6^{7}
17	(Cyprus) M Baghdatis	2	4	2
(Italy) S Bolelli	6	6	6
LL	(France) J Ouanna	3	2	3
(Argentina) JM del Potro	6	6	6
(France) M Llodra	2	7^{7}	6	7
WC	(France) O Patience	6	6^{1}	3	5
WC	(Australia) R Smeets	1	0	0
11	(Czech Republic) T Berdych	6	6	6

Second round
7	(United States) J Blake	6^{2}	6	5	3
(Latvia) E Gulbis	7^{7}	3	7	6
(United States) B Reynolds	5	4	7	5
(Ecuador) N Lapentti	7	6	5	7
(Italy) S Bolelli	3	7^{7}	7	6
(Argentina) JM del Potro	6	6^{0}	5	2
(France) M Llodra	6	4	5	6	6
11	(Czech Republic) T Berdych	3	6	7	3	4

Third round
(Latvia) E Gulbis	6	7	6
(Ecuador) N Lapentti	3	5	2
(Italy) S Bolelli	6^{2}	4	6^{5}
(France) M Llodra	7^{7}	6	7^{7}

Fourth round
(Latvia) E Gulbis	6	7^{7}	6
(France) M Llodra	4	6^{4}	3

==== Section 6 ====
First round
16	(Spain) C Moyá	6^{4}	2	7^{7}	6	3
Q	(Argentina) E Schwank	7^{7}	6	6^{1}	4	6
(Spain) M Granollers	6	3	6	6
(Germany) M Berrer	3	6	2	3
(Spain) Ó Hernández	4	7^{7}	6	7
(Czech Republic) I Minář	6	6^{5}	3	5
WC	(Brazil) G Kuerten	3	4	2
18	(France) P-H Mathieu	6	6	6
29	(Argentina) G Cañas	6^{6}	6^{3}	6^{8}
WC	(United States) W Odesnik	7^{8}	7^{7}	7^{10}
(Sweden) J Björkman	4	4	3
(South Korea) H-t Lee	6	6	6
(Canada) F Dancevic	6^{6}	6	5	6^{2}
Q	(Spain) MA López Jaén	7^{8}	3	7	7^{7}
(Germany) D Gremelmayr	6	3	5	2
3	(Serbia) N Djokovic	4	6	7	6

Second round
Q	(Argentina) E Schwank	6^{5}	6	6	6
(Spain) M Granollers	7^{7}	2	4	4
(Spain) Ó Hernández	6	6	4	3	2
18	(France) P-H Mathieu	2	1	6	6	6
WC	(United States) W Odesnik	6	4	6	6
(South Korea) H-t Lee	2	6	3	2
Q	(Spain) MA López Jaén	1	1	3
3	(Serbia) N Djokovic	6	6	6

Third round
Q	(Argentina) E Schwank	2	3	6	6^{9}
18	(France) P-H Mathieu	6	6	3	7^{11}
WC	(United States) W Odesnik	5	4	2
3	(Serbia) N Djokovic	7	6	6

Fourth round
18	(France) P-H Mathieu	4	3	4
3	(Serbia) N Djokovic	6	6	6

==== Section 7 ====
First round
6	(Argentina) D Nalbandian	6	6	6
(Argentina) C Berlocq	2	4	1
WC	(France) J Chardy	6	6	7^{7}
Q	(Portugal) F Gil	3	2	6^{1}
(Spain) G García López	6	6	7^{7}
(Argentina) S Roitman	2	4	6^{5}
Q	(Germany) D Brands	2	4	5
30	(Russia) D Tursunov	6	6	7
19	(Spain) N Almagro	6	7	6
(Serbia) B Pašanski	4	5	1
LL	(Argentina) S Decoud	3	6	6	6^{8}	6
(Belgium) O Rochus	6	4	3	7^{10}	1
PR	(Slovakia) D Hrbatý	4	2	4
(Argentina) J Acasuso	6	6	6
WC	(France) J Eysseric	2	6	6	0	2
10	(United Kingdom) A Murray	6	1	4	6	6

Second round
6	(Argentina) D Nalbandian	6	6	2	1	2
WC	(France) J Chardy	3	4	6	6	6
(Spain) G García López	6^{4}	0	0
30	(Russia) D Tursunov	7^{7}	6	6
19	(Spain) N Almagro	7^{7}	6	6
LL	(Argentina) S Decoud	6^{2}	2	1
(Argentina) J Acasuso	4	0	4
10	(United Kingdom) A Murray	6	6	6

Third round
WC	(France) J Chardy	7^{7}	6	6
30	(Russia) D Tursunov	6^{1}	3	4
19	(Spain) N Almagro	6	6^{3}	6	7
10	(United Kingdom) A Murray	3	7^{7}	3	5

Fourth round
WC	(France) J Chardy	6^{0}	6^{7}	5
19	(Spain) N Almagro	7^{7}	7^{9}	7

==== Section 8 ====
First round
15	(Russia) M Youzhny	6	6	7^{7}
(Germany) B Becker	1	3	6^{4}
Q	(Argentina) M González	6	7	4	3	6
Q	(Croatia) R Karanušić	3	5	6	6	2
(United States) J Isner	6	6	5	3	4
(Argentina) JI Chela	2	3	7	6	6
(Spain) S Ventura	6	3	4	7^{8}	1
22	(Spain) F Verdasco	4	6	6	6^{6}	6
26	(Finland) J Nieminen	2	6	6	6
LL	(Spain) M López	6	3	4	3
(Argentina) M Vassallo Argüello	7^{7}	6	3	4	6
(Spain) F López	6^{1}	4	6	6	3
(Australia) C Guccione	4	1	4
Q	(France) N Devilder	6	6	6
Q	(Brazil) T Bellucci	5	3	1
2	(Spain) R Nadal	7	6	6

Second round
15	(Russia) M Youzhny	6	6	6
Q	(Argentina) M González	3	2	2
(Argentina) JI Chela	5	6	3	5
22	(Spain) F Verdasco	7	4	6	7
26	(Finland) J Nieminen	7	6	3	7^{7}
(Argentina) M Vassallo Argüello	5	1	6	6^{2}
Q	(France) N Devilder	4	0	1
2	(Spain) R Nadal	6	6	6

Third round
15	(Russia) M Youzhny	6^{5}	7	5	1
22	(Spain) F Verdasco	7^{7}	5	7	6
26	(Finland) J Nieminen	1	3	1
2	(Spain) R Nadal	6	6	6

Fourth round
22	(Spain) F Verdasco	1	0	2
2	(Spain) R Nadal	6	6	6

Preceded by 2008 Australian Open – Men's singles	Grand Slam men's singles	Succeeded by 2008 Wimbledon Championships – Men's singles
