= Clay court =

Type of tennis court

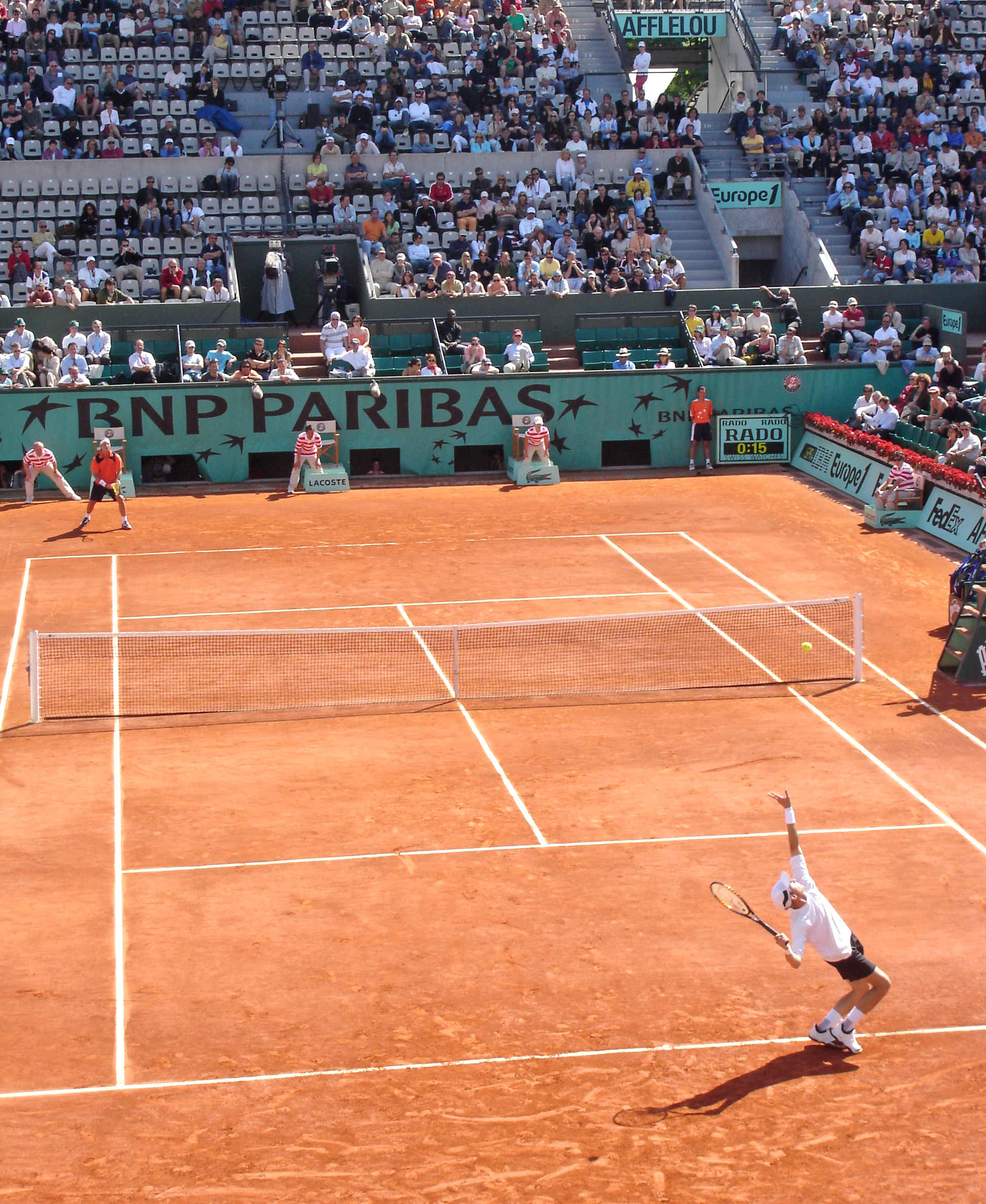
Court Philippe Chatrier at Stade Roland Garros in Paris during the 2006 French Open

A clay court is one of the types of tennis court on which the sport of tennis is played. Clay courts are built on a foundation of crushed stone, particularly limestone, shale, and other aggregate, with a thin layer of fine clay particles on top. Clay courts are more common in Continental Europe and Latin America than in North America, Asia-Pacific, or Britain. The only Grand Slam tournament that uses clay courts is the French Open.

Clay courts come in the more common red clay, a distinctive color obtained from the superior layer of thin crushed brick, and the slightly harder green clay, which is actually crushed metabasalt. Although slightly less expensive to construct than other types of tennis courts, clay requires much maintenance: the surface must be watered and rolled regularly to preserve texture and flatness, and brushed carefully before and during each match.

== Early history ==
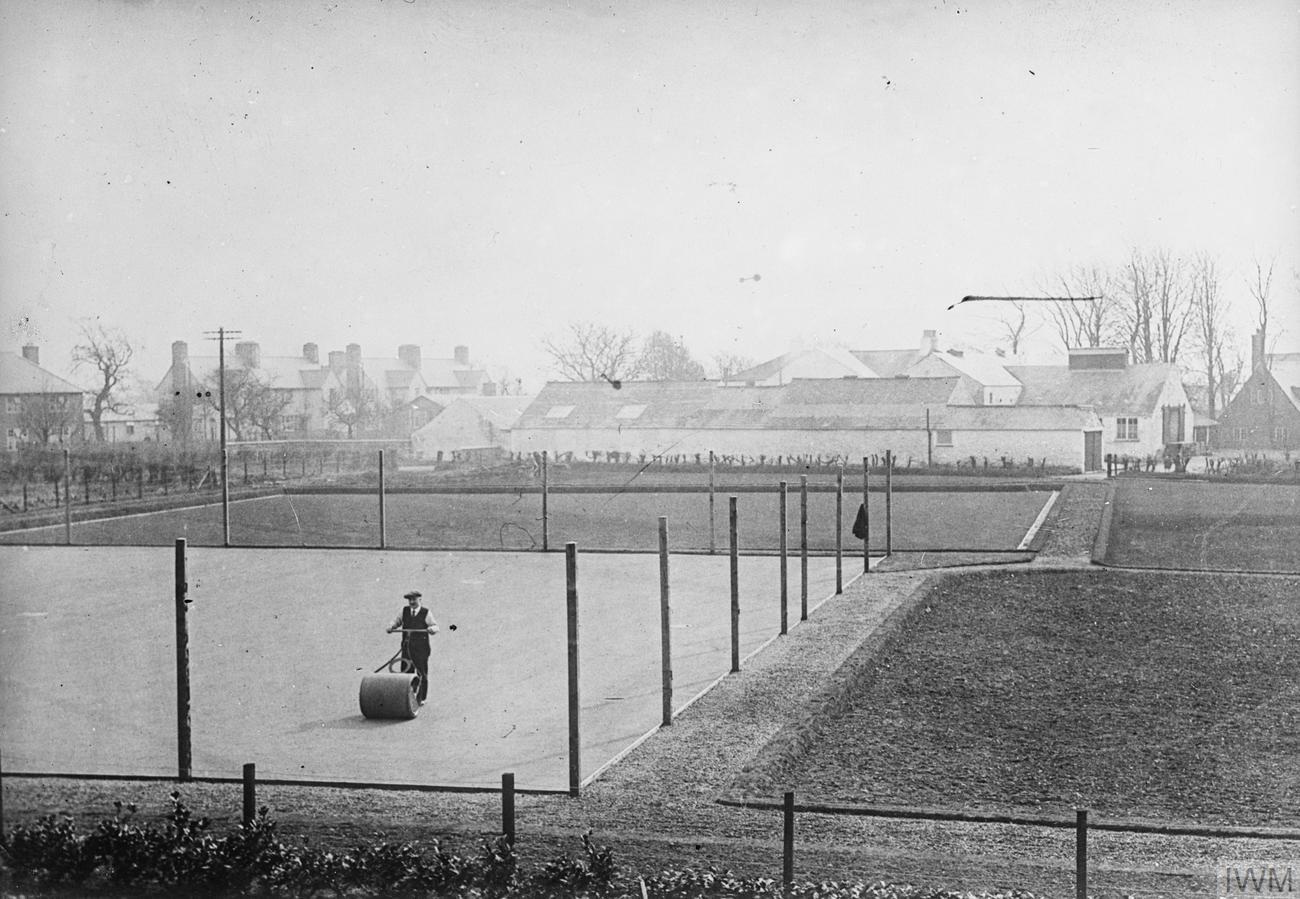
A clay court being rolled at Gretna Green, Scotland, in the 1910s

Clay courts, although now commonly associated with continental Europe, were said to be the creation of the English tennis player William Renshaw (a seven times Wimbledon champion) and his twin brother Ernest. The Renshaws had built a grass court at their summer home on the French Riviera, but found it unable to withstand prolonged exposure to heat and sunlight. To remedy this, in 1890 William Renshaw decided that the court should be covered with a fine powder that would protect it from the sun's rays. This powder was sourced from discarded terracotta discovered at a small ceramics factory in Vallauris, near Cannes, where the brothers regularly purchased decorative pots for their garden. Success with the new surface came quickly: after only a year or two, it was reported that 104 clay courts had been built in Cannes alone. Brick powder soon replaced the Vallauris terracotta pots, as the factory could not keep up with this eruption in demand.

Courts covered in a top layer of brick dust thereafter became the norm in many Mediterranean and South American countries, as they are not only durable in summer but do not need to be tended and mowed, unlike grass courts (although they do require regular maintenance involving rolling, "dragging", and occasional watering). Yet further improvements were still imperative, as the bounce on these courts was often irregular, the surface dried slowly after rain had fallen, and the courts could not be used in winter months for fear of damage. In 1909, the newly established Leicestershire firm En-Tout-Cas (translated roughly into English as "in all conditions") came up with a prototype court made from crushed brick and burnt shale that could drain much more quickly than standard clay courts. These proved very popular once offered as a product, and by the 1920s the company was responsible for laying clay courts for the Davis Cup and at the French, British and Canadian Championships. During the following decade the American engineer Henry Alexander Robinson went still further, creating a surface based on classic clay augmented with green piled metabasalt rock, which he hoped would help deliver a more consistent bounce. This became known as Har-Tru, derived from Robinson's initials and the 'true' nature of the bounce experienced on the court. First used in Hagerstown, Maryland, in 1932, green Har-Tru clay soon became the preferred surface for American clay court tournaments. In later years, the Har-Tru company would go on to develop all-weather clay surfaces at its factory in Charlottesville, Virginia, that could be played on throughout the entire year.

== Variants ==
=== Red clay ===
Almost all red clay courts are now made not of natural clay but of crushed brick that is packed to make the court, with the top most layers consisting of finely crushed loose particles. Such courts are most common in Europe and Latin America. The exact color of the surface varies with the composition of the bricks used, and can appear from a light yellow to a deep red.

Natural clay courts are rare because this type of surface does not absorb water easily and takes two to three days to dry. A good example of natural red clay can be seen at the Frick Park Clay Courts in Pittsburgh, a public facility of six red clay courts that has been in continual use since 1930.

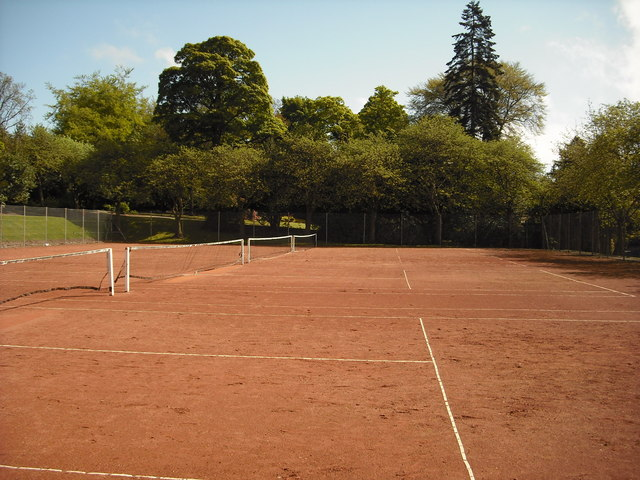
A shale or "blaes" court, as seen here in Scotland

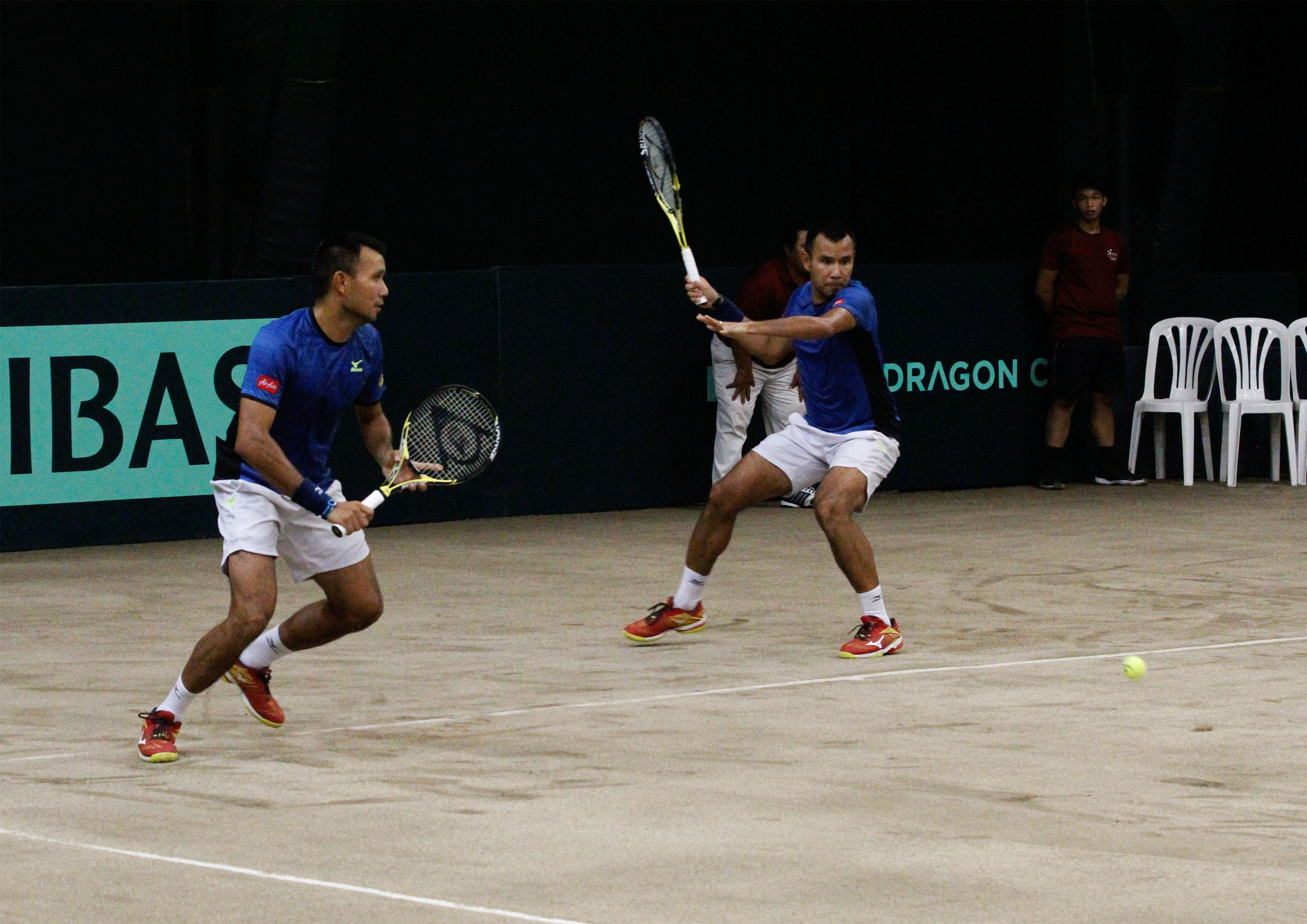
Thai players Sanchai and Sonchat Ratiwatana on a shell court in the Philippines

Sports surface providers such as En-Tout-Cas still offer red clay surfaces with a coarser top layer to improve drainage. These courts are particularly popular in southern Australian states such as Victoria, where the phrase 'En-Tout-Cas' is a common generic shorthand for a clay court.

In Britain, where En-Tout-Cas is based, most red clay courts have a surface dressing of burnt shale (with or without brick) for drainage purposes. However, shale courts are now comparatively rare, having been steadily replaced in many clubs by all-weather synthetic surfaces (including artificial clay). The few courts that remain tend to be found in industrial areas such as central Scotland and Lancashire, as shale – known as blaes in Scotland – is a constituent element of colliery waste and thus can be easily and cheaply sourced in such locations. Shale 'clay' courts tend to be a paler shade of red than their European counterparts, and the gritty texture of the surface means that the ball does not slow down as quickly as it does on powdery continental clay.

Aside from crushed brick and shale, other surfaces have also been used as a substitute for natural red clay. In Queensland and New South Wales, courts made from crushed ant hill mounds (known as "ant bed" or "dirt" courts) can occasionally be found; these are similar in appearance to standard red clay courts, as the ant hill "loam" or grit is pinky-brown in color. Top Australian competitors such as Mal Anderson, Roy Emerson and Rod Laver, who all grew up in Queensland, practiced on ant bed courts when they were young. Courts made out of crushed seashells, which create a gritty, sand-like surface, are common in the Philippines.

=== Green clay ===
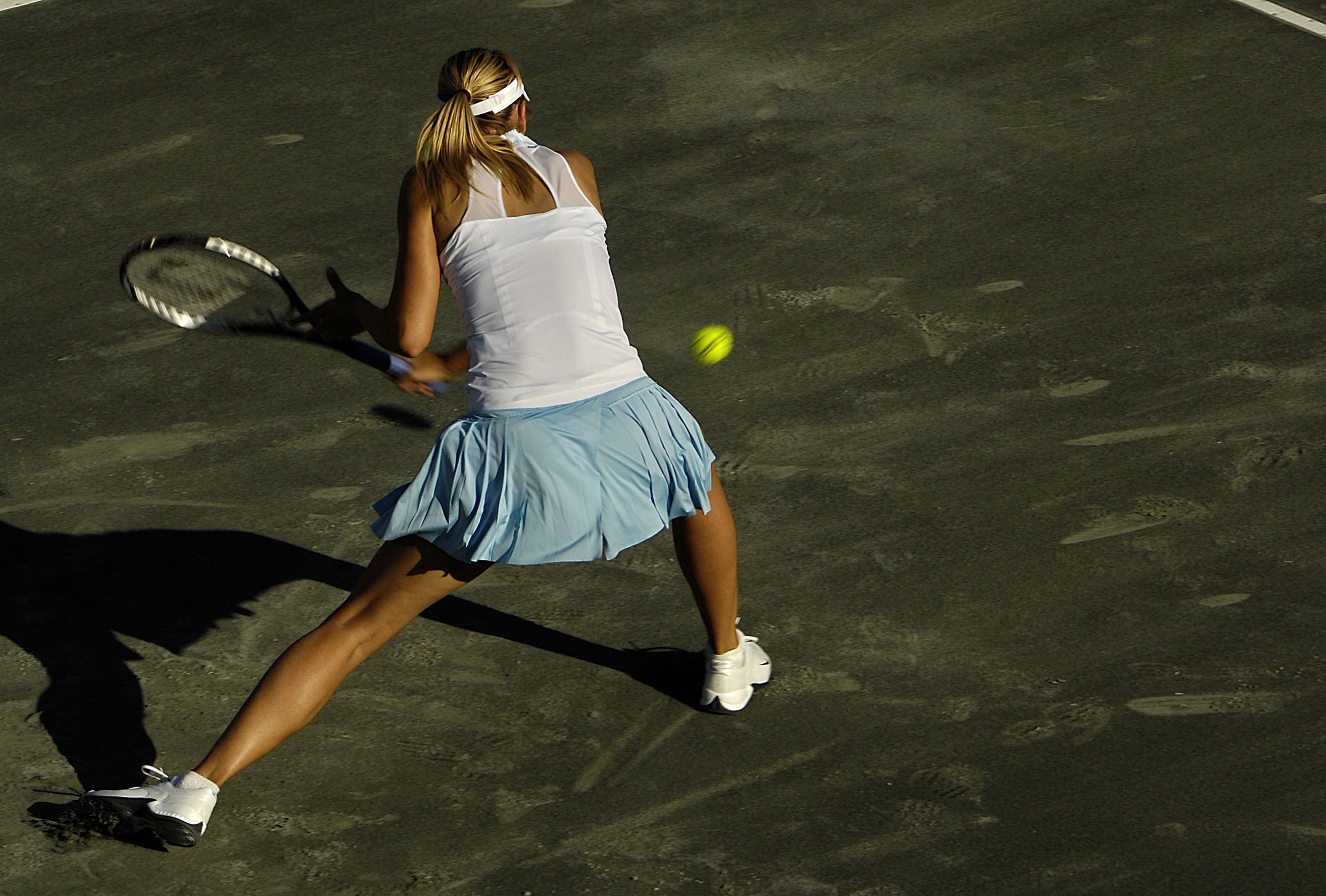
Maria Sharapova during the 2008 Family Circle Cup played on green clay

Green clay, also known by brand names such as Har-Tru and Rubico, is made of crushed metabasalt rather than brick, making the surface slightly harder and faster than red clay. These courts are located primarily in the mid-Atlantic and southern United States. They are also found in Central and Eastern Canada. There is one WTA tournament played on green Har-Tru clay courts, the Charleston Open in Charleston, South Carolina. From 1975 until 1977, the US Open was played on Har-Tru clay courts.

The US Men's Clay Court Championships are played on clay that has a maroon color. Not only is this a darker color than other clay courts used in the professional game, but it is also a type of Har-Tru court, meaning it is actually composed of the same substance (basalt) as green clay courts, and not a type of red clay. Har-Tru market this kind of court as "American red clay".

=== Blue clay ===
Blue clay was an experimental type of clay, the same as red clay but dyed blue. The rationale for it being created was that it would make the ball easier to see for television viewers. It made its first appearance in professional competition in the 2012 Madrid Open. Due to the blue clay being more slippery than regular clay and due to threats of boycotts from several high-ranking players if it continued to be used, the blue clay was never used again as the Madrid Open returned to red clay the next year.

== Play ==
Clay courts are considered "slow" because the balls bounce relatively high and lose much of their initial speed when contacting the surface, making it more difficult for a player to deliver an unreturnable shot. Points are usually longer as there are fewer winners. Clay courts favor baseliners who are consistent and have a strong defensive game, leading to players such as Rafael Nadal, Björn Borg, Chris Evert, and Justine Henin finding success at the French Open. Players who excel on clay courts but struggle to replicate the same form on fast courts are known as clay-court specialists (or, more pejoratively, as "dirtballers"). Clay-court players generally play in a semicircle about 1.5 to 3 metres (5 to 10 feet) behind the baseline. Clay courts favor the "full western grip" for more topspin. Clay court players use topspins to throw off their opponents.

Movement on the loose surface is very different from movement on any other surface, often involving sliding toward the incoming ball while preparing for the return stroke.{{|date=August 2023}}

Clay courts are unique in that the ball bounce leaves an impression in the ground, which can help determine whether a shot was in or out. Furthermore, clay courts are still playable in light rain because the courts are meant to be slightly wet when played on and the surface absorbs water better than hard courts and grass courts. This is opposed to hard courts and grass courts where play is usually suspended almost immediately during even light rain.

== Players ==
In the pre-open era Anthony Wilding is particularly notable for his achievements on clay courts. Starting in May 1910 at the Championship of South Africa and ending in June 1914 at the World Hard Court Championships he registered 120 consecutive clay court match victories.

Rafael Nadal, winner of a record 14 French Open men's singles titles, is noted for his success on clay; since his debut in 2005, he only lost four times at the tournament – in 2009, 2015, 2021 and 2024. Nadal holds the record for the longest winning streak by any male player on a single surface since the Open Era began in 1968: 81 clay court wins between April 2005 and May 2007. He also holds the record for most clay court titles in the Open Era, with 63. Guillermo Vilas won 49 of his 62 singles titles on clay. He only won a single French Open title, although he also won the US Open in 1977 while it was held on clay. Thomas Muster is also considered a successful clay court player; although he also only won the French Open once, 40 out of his 44 career singles titles were won on clay. Other notable players who had significant success on clay include Ivan Lendl and Björn Borg – the former winning the French Open in 1984, 1986, and 1987, while the latter won it 6 times.

While often overshadowed by Nadal's clay successes due to being contemporaries, Roger Federer and Novak Djokovic also were known for being extremely formidable on clay courts throughout their careers and had significant successes. Federer made the final of the French Open 5 times, including every year from 2006 to 2009, finally winning the last one in the sequence, while Djokovic has won the title 3 times (2016, 2021, 2023), beating Nadal en route to the title in 2021, while making it to the final an additional 4 times on top of that. Federer is also notable for ending Nadal's 81 match win streak on clay courts at the 2007 Hamburg Masters.

On the women's side, Monica Seles, Justine Henin and Iga Świątek hold the open era record for the number of consecutive French Open titles won at three (1990–1992 for Seles, 2005–2007 for Henin and 2022–2024 for Swiatek). In the pre-open era this feat was first achieved by Helen Wills Moody (1928–1930) and followed by Hilde Krahwinkel Sperling (1935–1937).

Chris Evert holds the record for longest winning streak on clay for either gender in the open era: from August 1973 to May 1979, she won 125 consecutive clay court matches. During this time, Evert skipped three editions of the French Open (1976–78), to participate in World Team Tennis. She also has the highest career win percentage on clay courts (94.55%) during the open era.

The most successful currently active female player on clay is Iga Świątek, who won the French Open in 2020, 2022, 2023, and 2024. In 2022 and 2024, Świątek won three titles and lost only one match on clay.

=== Clay-court specialist ===
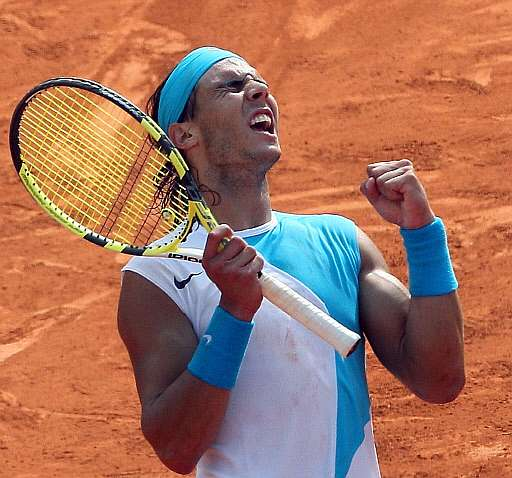
Rafael Nadal is known as "The King of Clay".

A clay-court specialist is a tennis player who excels on clay courts, more than on any other surface.

Due in part to advances in racquet technology, current clay-court specialists are known for employing long, winding groundstrokes that generate heavy topspin; such strokes are less effective on faster surfaces on which the balls do not bounce as high. Clay-court specialists tend to slide more effectively on clay than other players. Many of them are also very adept at hitting the drop shot, which can be effective because rallies on clay courts often leave players pushed far beyond the baseline. Additionally, the slow, long rallies require a great degree of mental focus and physical stamina.

The definition of "clay-court specialist" has varied. Anthony Wilding, Sergi Bruguera, Albert Costa and Gastón Gaudio were French Open champions who won all or nearly all of their career titles on clay. Andrés Gimeno, Adriano Panatta, Manuel Orantes, Yannick Noah, Michael Chang, Thomas Muster, Gustavo Kuerten, Carlos Moyá and Juan Carlos Ferrero won major titles only on clay, but won lower tournaments, including Masters Series events, on other surfaces. Among female players, there have been few whose best results were confined exclusively to clay. Virginia Ruzici, Anastasia Myskina, Iva Majoli, Sue Barker, Ana Ivanovic, Francesca Schiavone and Jeļena Ostapenko are the only female players to have won major titles at only the French Open since the beginning of the open era.

Increasingly, clay courters have attempted to play better on other surfaces, with some success. Ferrero reached the final of the US Open in 2003, the same year he won the French Open, and also won several hardcourt tournaments. Nadal was considered a clay court specialist until a string of successes on other surfaces—including completing a Double Career Grand Slam and a Career Golden Slam—led to a broadening of his reputation. 2016 French Open winner Garbiñe Muguruza reached the 2015 Wimbledon final and won the 2017 Wimbledon title.

== Professional tournaments played on clay ==
The professional clay court season comprises many more tournaments than the brief grass court season, but is still shorter than the hard court seasons. There are three distinct clay court seasons during the year.

The first is the men's South American clay season. Played primarily in February between the Australian Open and the Indian Wells Masters, the ATP has four tournaments in this swing, although other ATP tournaments played on hardcourt occur the same weeks. The WTA discontinued its participation in Rio de Janeiro after 2016, so there are no clay court women's tournaments during this period.

The second is the long spring clay season that starts in the Americas and Morocco before moving to mainland Europe and finishing with the French Open. It is usually played over two months between April and June, after the Miami Open. Unlike the other two clay seasons, this swing does not share the majority of its time with simultaneous hard court tournaments.

The third is the brief summer clay season that takes place after Wimbledon. It is entirely in Europe, and usually takes place in July. Near the end of the swing, it overlaps with the beginning of the US Open Series.

ATP	WTA
Grand Slam tournaments
ATP 1000	WTA 1000
ATP 500	WTA 500
ATP 250	WTA 250

=== South American clay season ===
Week	ATP
Week 1	Argentina Open (Buenos Aires, Argentina)
Week 2	Rio Open (Rio de Janeiro, Brazil)
Week 3	Chile Open (Santiago, Chile)

=== Spring clay season ===
Week	ATP	WTA
Week 1	Grand Prix Hassan II (Marrakesh, Morocco); U.S. Men's Clay Court Championships (Houston, United States)	Charleston Open (Charleston, South Carolina, United States)
Week 2	Monte-Carlo Masters (Roquebrune-Cap-Martin, France)	Copa Colsanitas (Bogotá, Colombia); Ladies Open Lugano (Lugano, Switzerland)
Week 3	Barcelona Open (Barcelona, Spain)	Stuttgart Open (Stuttgart, Germany)
Week 3		İstanbul Cup (Istanbul, Turkey)
Week 4	Bavarian Championships (Munich, Germany)	Morocco Open (Rabat, Morocco); Prague Open (Prague, Czech Republic)
Week 5	Madrid Open (Madrid, Spain)	
Week 6	Italian Open (Rome, Italy)	
Week 7	Geneva Open (Geneva, Switzerland); Lyon Open (Lyon, France)	Internationaux de Strasbourg (Strasbourg, France)
Week 8	French Open (Paris, France)	
Week 9	French Open (Paris, France)	

=== Summer clay season ===
Week	ATP	WTA
Week 1	Swedish Open (Båstad, Sweden); Croatia Open (Umag, Croatia)	Bucharest Open (Bucharest, Romania); Swiss Open (Lausanne, Switzerland)
Week 2	German Open (Hamburg, Germany)	Baltic Open (Jūrmala, Latvia); Palermo Open (Palermo, Italy)
Week 2	Swiss Open (Gstaad, Switzerland)	Baltic Open (Jūrmala, Latvia); Palermo Open (Palermo, Italy)
Week 3	Austrian Open (Kitzbühel, Austria)	Poland Open (Warsaw, Poland)

== See also ==
- Hard court
- Grass court
- Carpet court
- Wood court
