= Rafael Nadal at the French Open =

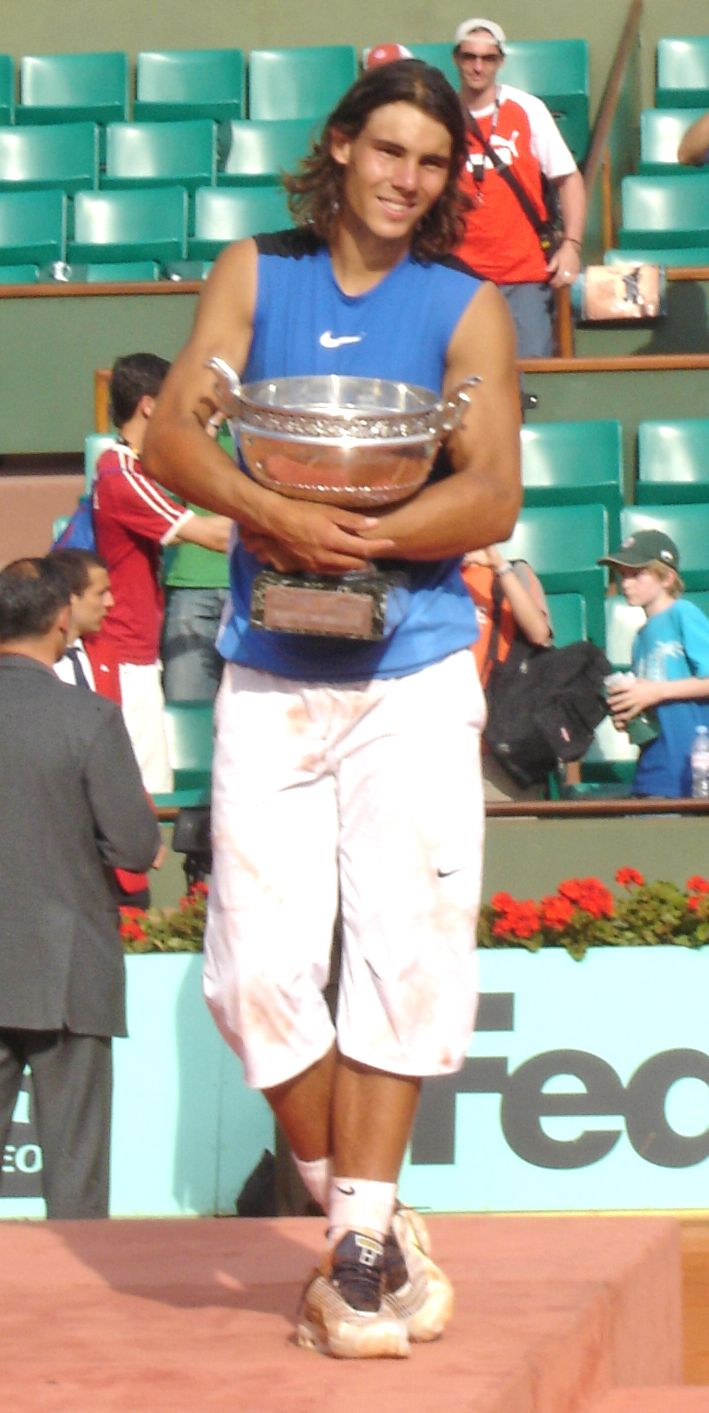
- Rafael Nadal holding the Coupe des Mousquetaires in 2006.
- Full name: Rafael "Rafa" Nadal Parera
- Country (sports): Spain

Singles
- Career record: 112–4 (Note: Nadal withdrew before the third round in 2016 due to a wrist injury, which does not officially count as a loss.)
- Career titles: 14

Grand Slam singles results
- French Open: W (2005, 2006, 2007, 2008, 2010, 2011, 2012, 2013, 2014, 2017, 2018, 2019, 2020, 2022)

Spanish tennis player Rafael Nadal's fourteen French Open titles hold numerous records in the all-time and Open Era categories for tennis, with his longtime rival, Roger Federer, calling it "one of the greatest achievements in sport". He holds a 112–4 record at the event.

Nadal won the French Open on his tournament debut in 2005, aged 19. From 2005 to 2014, he won 9 out of 10 French Open titles, including five in a row from 2010 to 2014. From 2017 to 2022, he won a further 5 out of 6 French Open titles, claiming his last title at the age of 36. In all 14 finals, he was never taken to five sets, and never defeated. Across all 116 of his matches, Nadal was taken to a fifth set on only three occasions; he never lost a fifth set at the tournament. He won the French Open without losing a set on a record four occasions: in 2008, 2010, 2017, and 2020. Nadal defeated the incumbent world No. 1 singles player during eight of his championship runs (four times each against Roger Federer and Novak Djokovic). His 14 singles titles at the event are an Open Era record for any professional tennis tournament, and an all-time record for any Grand Slam tournament.

Nadal's longest match at the French Open in terms of games played, at 55 games played, was his 2013 semifinal match against Djokovic, which Nadal won by the score of 6–4, 3–6, 6–1, 6–7^{(3–7)}, 9–7, in 4 hours and 37 minutes. His longest match at the French Open in terms of match time was his third-round match in 2006 against Paul-Henri Mathieu, which Nadal won 5–7, 6–4, 6–4, 6–4, in 4 hours and 53 minutes, despite only 42 games played.

Nadal only lost four matches at the French Open in total: to Robin Söderling in the fourth round in 2009, to Novak Djokovic in the quarterfinals in 2015 and in the semifinals in 2021, and to Alexander Zverev in the first round in 2024. He did not play at the event three times during his career, all due to injury; in 2003, 2004, and 2023. Nadal also withdrew from the tournament in 2016 before his scheduled third-round match, due to a wrist injury sustained during practice.

In 2021, while Nadal was still an active player, the French Tennis Federation erected a statue of him at the site of the tournament, Stade Roland Garros, honoring his achievements there. In May 2025, following Nadal's retirement, the French Tennis Federation also unveiled a plaque on Court Philippe Chatrier in further celebration of his achievements.

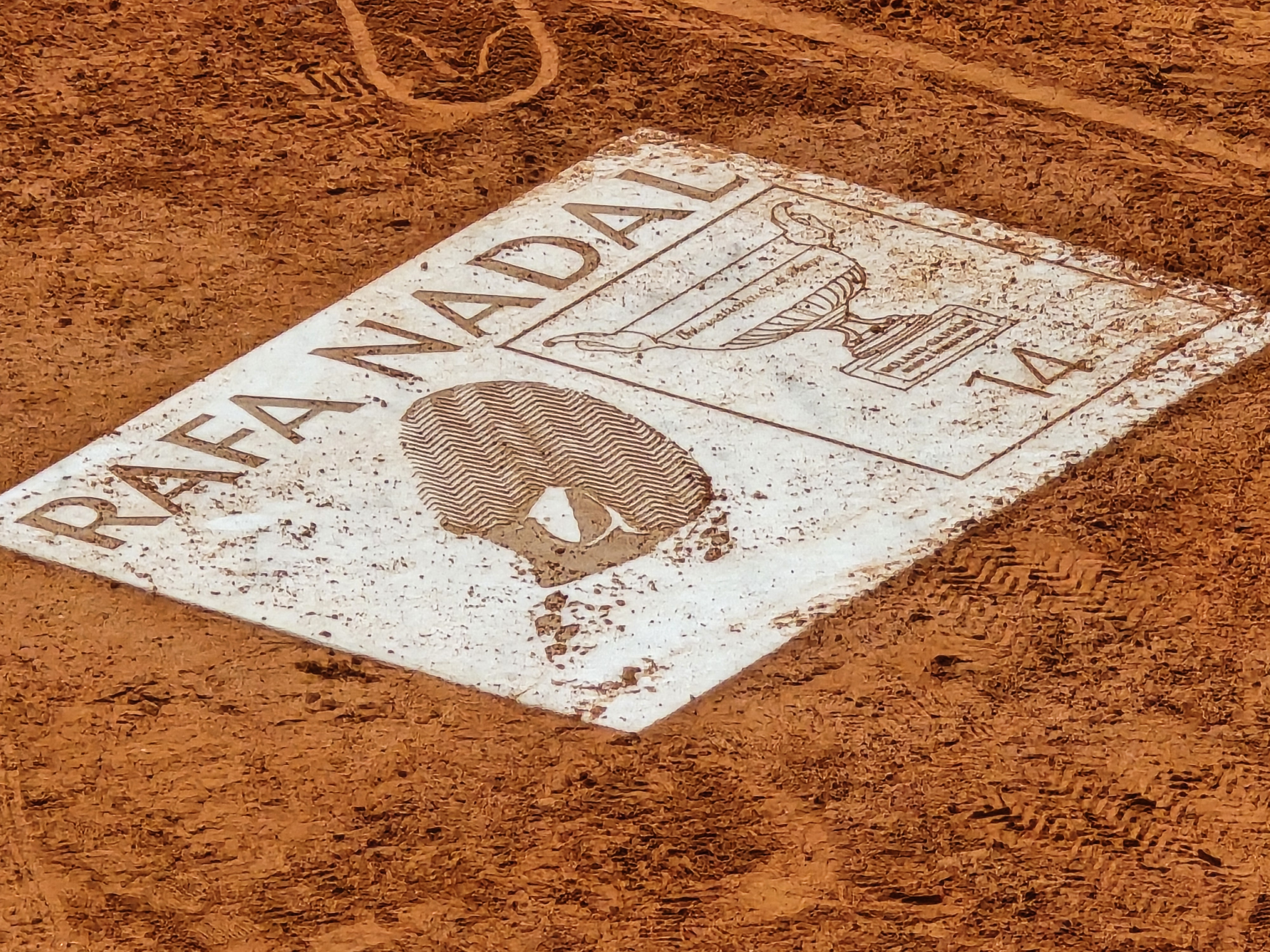
Commemorative plaque to Rafael Nadal unveiled at the Court Philippe Chatrier during a tribute at the 2025 French Open

== Overview ==
=== Finals: 14 (14 titles) ===
Result	Year	Title	Surface	Opponent	Score
Win	2005	1	Clay	(Argentina) Mariano Puerta	6–7^{(6–8)}, 6–3, 6–1, 7–5
Win	2006	2	Clay	(Switzerland) Roger Federer	1–6, 6–1, 6–4, 7–6^{(7–4)}
Win	2007	3	Clay	(Switzerland) Roger Federer	6–3, 4–6, 6–3, 6–4
Win	2008	4	Clay	(Switzerland) Roger Federer	6–1, 6–3, 6–0
Win	2010	5	Clay	(Sweden) Robin Söderling	6–4, 6–2, 6–4
Win	2011	6	Clay	(Switzerland) Roger Federer	7–5, 7–6^{(7–3)}, 5–7, 6–1
Win	2012	7	Clay	(Serbia) Novak Djokovic	6–4, 6–3, 2–6, 7–5
Win	2013	8	Clay	(Spain) David Ferrer	6–3, 6–2, 6–3
Win	2014	9	Clay	(Serbia) Novak Djokovic	3–6, 7–5, 6–2, 6–4
Win	2017	10	Clay	(Switzerland) Stan Wawrinka	6–2, 6–3, 6–1
Win	2018	11	Clay	(Austria) Dominic Thiem	6–4, 6–3, 6–2
Win	2019	12	Clay	(Austria) Dominic Thiem	6–3, 5–7, 6–1, 6–1
Win	2020	13	Clay	(Serbia) Novak Djokovic	6–0, 6–2, 7–5
Win	2022	14	Clay	(Norway) Casper Ruud	6–3, 6–3, 6–0

== All matches ==
=== Singles (112 wins, 4 losses) ===
Tournament	Match	Round	Opponent (seed or key)	Rank	Result	Score
French Open; Paris, France; Grand Slam tournament Clay, outdoor 26 May – 8 June 2003
French Open; Paris, France; Grand Slam tournament Clay, outdoor 26 May – 8 June 2003	Withdrew					
French Open; Paris, France; Grand Slam tournament Clay, outdoor 24 May – 6 June 2004
French Open; Paris, France; Grand Slam tournament Clay, outdoor 24 May – 6 June 2004	Withdrew					
French Open; Paris, France; Grand Slam tournament Clay, outdoor 23 May – 5 June 2005
French Open; Paris, France; Grand Slam tournament Clay, outdoor 23 May – 5 June 2005	1 / 116	1R	(Germany) Lars Burgsmüller	96	Win	6–1, 7–6^{(7–4)}, 6–1
French Open; Paris, France; Grand Slam tournament Clay, outdoor 23 May – 5 June 2005	2 / 116	2R	(Belgium) Xavier Malisse	46	Win	6–2, 6–2, 6–4
French Open; Paris, France; Grand Slam tournament Clay, outdoor 23 May – 5 June 2005	3 / 116	3R	(France) Richard Gasquet	31	Win	6–4, 6–3, 6–2
French Open; Paris, France; Grand Slam tournament Clay, outdoor 23 May – 5 June 2005	4 / 116	4R	(France) Sébastien Grosjean	24	Win	6–4, 3–6, 6–0, 6–3
French Open; Paris, France; Grand Slam tournament Clay, outdoor 23 May – 5 June 2005	5 / 116	QF	(Spain) David Ferrer	21	Win	7–5, 6–2, 6–0
French Open; Paris, France; Grand Slam tournament Clay, outdoor 23 May – 5 June 2005	6 / 116	SF	(Switzerland) Roger Federer (1)	1	Win	6–3, 4–6, 6–4, 6–3
French Open; Paris, France; Grand Slam tournament Clay, outdoor 23 May – 5 June 2005	7 / 116	W	(Argentina) Mariano Puerta	37	Win (1)	6–7^{(6–8)}, 6–3, 6–1, 7–5
French Open; Paris, France; Grand Slam tournament Clay, outdoor 29 May – 11 June 2006	8 / 116	1R	(Sweden) Robin Söderling	50	Win	6–2, 7–5, 6–1
French Open; Paris, France; Grand Slam tournament Clay, outdoor 29 May – 11 June 2006	9 / 116	2R	(United States) Kevin Kim	116	Win	6–2, 6–1, 6–4
French Open; Paris, France; Grand Slam tournament Clay, outdoor 29 May – 11 June 2006	10 / 116	3R	(France) Paul-Henri Mathieu	32	Win	5–7, 6–4, 6–4, 6–4
French Open; Paris, France; Grand Slam tournament Clay, outdoor 29 May – 11 June 2006	11 / 116	4R	(Australia) Lleyton Hewitt	14	Win	6–2, 5–7, 6–4, 6–2
French Open; Paris, France; Grand Slam tournament Clay, outdoor 29 May – 11 June 2006	12 / 116	QF	(Serbia and Montenegro) Novak Djokovic	63	Win	6–4, 6–4, RET
French Open; Paris, France; Grand Slam tournament Clay, outdoor 29 May – 11 June 2006	13 / 116	SF	(Croatia) Ivan Ljubičić (4)	4	Win	6–4, 6–2, 7–6^{(9–7)}
French Open; Paris, France; Grand Slam tournament Clay, outdoor 29 May – 11 June 2006	14 / 116	W	(Switzerland) Roger Federer (1)	1	Win (2)	1–6, 6–1, 6–4, 7–6^{(7–4)}
French Open; Paris, France; Grand Slam tournament Clay, outdoor 27 May – 10 June 2007	15 / 116	1R	(Argentina) Juan Martín del Potro	59	Win	7–5, 6–3, 6–2
French Open; Paris, France; Grand Slam tournament Clay, outdoor 27 May – 10 June 2007	16 / 116	2R	(Italy) Flavio Cipolla	227	Win	6–2, 6–1, 6–4
French Open; Paris, France; Grand Slam tournament Clay, outdoor 27 May – 10 June 2007	17 / 116	3R	(Spain) Albert Montañés	50	Win	6–1, 6–3, 6–2
French Open; Paris, France; Grand Slam tournament Clay, outdoor 27 May – 10 June 2007	18 / 116	4R	(Australia) Lleyton Hewitt	16	Win	6–3, 6–1, 7–6^{(7–5)}
French Open; Paris, France; Grand Slam tournament Clay, outdoor 27 May – 10 June 2007	19 / 116	QF	(Spain) Carlos Moyá	26	Win	6–4, 6–3, 6–0
French Open; Paris, France; Grand Slam tournament Clay, outdoor 27 May – 10 June 2007	20 / 116	SF	(Serbia) Novak Djokovic (6)	6	Win	7–5, 6–4, 6–2
French Open; Paris, France; Grand Slam tournament Clay, outdoor 27 May – 10 June 2007	21 / 116	W	(Switzerland) Roger Federer (1)	1	Win (3)	6–3, 4–6, 6–3, 6–4
French Open; Paris, France; Grand Slam tournament Clay, outdoor 25 May – 7 June 2008	22 / 116	1R	(Brazil) Thomaz Bellucci	76	Win	7–5, 6–3, 6–1
French Open; Paris, France; Grand Slam tournament Clay, outdoor 25 May – 7 June 2008	23 / 116	2R	(France) Nicolas Devilder	148	Win	6–4, 6–0, 6–1
French Open; Paris, France; Grand Slam tournament Clay, outdoor 25 May – 7 June 2008	24 / 116	3R	(Finland) Jarkko Nieminen	26	Win	6–1, 6–3, 6–1
French Open; Paris, France; Grand Slam tournament Clay, outdoor 25 May – 7 June 2008	25 / 116	4R	(Spain) Fernando Verdasco	23	Win	6–1, 6–0, 6–2
French Open; Paris, France; Grand Slam tournament Clay, outdoor 25 May – 7 June 2008	26 / 116	QF	(Spain) Nicolás Almagro	20	Win	6–1, 6–1, 6–1
French Open; Paris, France; Grand Slam tournament Clay, outdoor 25 May – 7 June 2008	27 / 116	SF	(Serbia) Novak Djokovic (3)	3	Win	6–4, 6–2, 7–6^{(7–3)}
French Open; Paris, France; Grand Slam tournament Clay, outdoor 25 May – 7 June 2008	28 / 116	W	(Switzerland) Roger Federer (1)	1	Win (4)	6–1, 6–3, 6–0
French Open; Paris, France; Grand Slam tournament Clay, outdoor 25 May – 7 June 2009
French Open; Paris, France; Grand Slam tournament Clay, outdoor 25 May – 7 June 2009	29 / 116	1R	(Brazil) Marcos Daniel (Q)	97	Win	7–5, 6–4, 6–3
French Open; Paris, France; Grand Slam tournament Clay, outdoor 25 May – 7 June 2009	30 / 116	2R	(Russia) Teymuraz Gabashvili	72	Win	6–1, 6–4, 6–2
French Open; Paris, France; Grand Slam tournament Clay, outdoor 25 May – 7 June 2009	31 / 116	3R	(Australia) Lleyton Hewitt	48	Win	6–1, 6–3, 6–1
French Open; Paris, France; Grand Slam tournament Clay, outdoor 25 May – 7 June 2009	32 / 116	4R	(Sweden) Robin Söderling (23)	25	Loss	2–6, 7–6^{(7–2)}, 4–6, 6–7^{(2–7)}
French Open; Paris, France; Grand Slam tournament Clay, outdoor 24 May – 6 June 2010
French Open; Paris, France; Grand Slam tournament Clay, outdoor 24 May – 6 June 2010	33 / 116	1R	(France) Gianni Mina (WC)	655	Win	6–2, 6–2, 6–2
French Open; Paris, France; Grand Slam tournament Clay, outdoor 24 May – 6 June 2010	34 / 116	2R	(Argentina) Horacio Zeballos	44	Win	6–2, 6–2, 6–3
French Open; Paris, France; Grand Slam tournament Clay, outdoor 24 May – 6 June 2010	35 / 116	3R	(Australia) Lleyton Hewitt (28)	33	Win	6–3, 6–4, 6–3
French Open; Paris, France; Grand Slam tournament Clay, outdoor 24 May – 6 June 2010	36 / 116	4R	(Brazil) Thomaz Bellucci (24)	29	Win	6–2, 7–5, 6–4
French Open; Paris, France; Grand Slam tournament Clay, outdoor 24 May – 6 June 2010	37 / 116	QF	(Spain) Nicolás Almagro (19)	21	Win	7–6^{(7–2)}, 7–6^{(7–3)}, 6–4
French Open; Paris, France; Grand Slam tournament Clay, outdoor 24 May – 6 June 2010	38 / 116	SF	(Austria) Jürgen Melzer (22)	27	Win	6–2, 6–3, 7–6^{(8–6)}
French Open; Paris, France; Grand Slam tournament Clay, outdoor 24 May – 6 June 2010	39 / 116	W	(Sweden) Robin Söderling (5)	7	Win (5)	6–4, 6–2, 6–4
French Open; Paris, France; Grand Slam tournament Clay, outdoor 23 May – 5 June 2011
French Open; Paris, France; Grand Slam tournament Clay, outdoor 23 May – 5 June 2011	40 / 116	1R	(United States) John Isner	39	Win	6–4, 6–7^{(2–7)}, 6–7^{(2–7)}, 6–2, 6–4
French Open; Paris, France; Grand Slam tournament Clay, outdoor 23 May – 5 June 2011	41 / 116	2R	(Spain) Pablo Andújar	48	Win	7–5, 6–3, 7–6^{(7–4)}
French Open; Paris, France; Grand Slam tournament Clay, outdoor 23 May – 5 June 2011	42 / 116	3R	(Croatia) Antonio Veić (Q)	227	Win	6–1, 6–3, 6–0
French Open; Paris, France; Grand Slam tournament Clay, outdoor 23 May – 5 June 2011	43 / 116	4R	(Croatia) Ivan Ljubičić	37	Win	7–5, 6–3, 6–3
French Open; Paris, France; Grand Slam tournament Clay, outdoor 23 May – 5 June 2011	44 / 116	QF	(Sweden) Robin Söderling (5)	5	Win	6–4, 6–1, 7–6^{(7–3)}
French Open; Paris, France; Grand Slam tournament Clay, outdoor 23 May – 5 June 2011	45 / 116	SF	(United Kingdom) Andy Murray (4)	4	Win	6–4, 7–5, 6–4
French Open; Paris, France; Grand Slam tournament Clay, outdoor 23 May – 5 June 2011	46 / 116	W	(Switzerland) Roger Federer (3)	3	Win (6)	7–5, 7–6^{(7–3)}, 5–7, 6–1
French Open; Paris, France; Grand Slam; Clay, outdoor 28 May – 10 June 2012	47 / 116	1R	(Italy) Simone Bolelli	111	Win	6–2, 6–2, 6–1
French Open; Paris, France; Grand Slam; Clay, outdoor 28 May – 10 June 2012	48 / 116	2R	(Uzbekistan) Denis Istomin	43	Win	6–2, 6–2, 6–0
French Open; Paris, France; Grand Slam; Clay, outdoor 28 May – 10 June 2012	49 / 116	3R	(Argentina) Eduardo Schwank	192	Win	6–1, 6–3, 6–4
French Open; Paris, France; Grand Slam; Clay, outdoor 28 May – 10 June 2012	50 / 116	4R	(Argentina) Juan Mónaco	15	Win	6–2, 6–0, 6–0
French Open; Paris, France; Grand Slam; Clay, outdoor 28 May – 10 June 2012	51 / 116	QF	(Spain) Nicolás Almagro	13	Win	7–6^{(7–4)}, 6–2, 6–3
French Open; Paris, France; Grand Slam; Clay, outdoor 28 May – 10 June 2012	52 / 116	SF	(Spain) David Ferrer	6	Win	6–2, 6–2, 6–1
French Open; Paris, France; Grand Slam; Clay, outdoor 28 May – 10 June 2012	53 / 116	W	(Serbia) Novak Djokovic (1)	1	Win (7)	6–4, 6–3, 2–6, 7–5
French Open; Paris, France; Grand Slam tournament Clay, outdoor May 26 – June 9, 2013	54 / 116	1R	(Germany) Daniel Brands	59	Win	4–6, 7–6^{(7–4)}, 6–4, 6–3
French Open; Paris, France; Grand Slam tournament Clay, outdoor May 26 – June 9, 2013	55 / 116	2R	(Slovakia) Martin Kližan	35	Win	4–6, 6–3, 6–3, 6–3
French Open; Paris, France; Grand Slam tournament Clay, outdoor May 26 – June 9, 2013	56 / 116	3R	(Italy) Fabio Fognini	29	Win	7–6^{(7–5)}, 6–4, 6–4
French Open; Paris, France; Grand Slam tournament Clay, outdoor May 26 – June 9, 2013	57 / 116	4R	(Japan) Kei Nishikori	15	Win	6–4, 6–1, 6–3
French Open; Paris, France; Grand Slam tournament Clay, outdoor May 26 – June 9, 2013	58 / 116	QF	(Switzerland) Stanislas Wawrinka	10	Win	6–2, 6–3, 6–1
French Open; Paris, France; Grand Slam tournament Clay, outdoor May 26 – June 9, 2013	59 / 116	SF	(Serbia) Novak Djokovic	1	Win	6–4, 3–6, 6–1, 6–7^{(3–7)}, 9–7
French Open; Paris, France; Grand Slam tournament Clay, outdoor May 26 – June 9, 2013	60 / 116	W	(Spain) David Ferrer (5)	5	Win (8)	6–3, 6–2, 6–3
French Open; Paris, France; Grand Slam tournament Clay, outdoor 25 May – 08 June 2014
French Open; Paris, France; Grand Slam tournament Clay, outdoor 25 May – 08 June 2014	61 / 116	1R	(United States) Robby Ginepri (WC)	279	Win	6–0, 6–3, 6–0
French Open; Paris, France; Grand Slam tournament Clay, outdoor 25 May – 08 June 2014	62 / 116	2R	(Austria) Dominic Thiem	57	Win	6–2, 6–2, 6–3
French Open; Paris, France; Grand Slam tournament Clay, outdoor 25 May – 08 June 2014	63 / 116	3R	(Argentina) Leonardo Mayer	65	Win	6–2, 7–5, 6–2
French Open; Paris, France; Grand Slam tournament Clay, outdoor 25 May – 08 June 2014	64 / 116	4R	(Serbia) Dušan Lajović	83	Win	6–1, 6–2, 6–1
French Open; Paris, France; Grand Slam tournament Clay, outdoor 25 May – 08 June 2014	65 / 116	QF	(Spain) David Ferrer (5)	5	Win	4–6, 6–4, 6–0, 6–1
French Open; Paris, France; Grand Slam tournament Clay, outdoor 25 May – 08 June 2014	66 / 116	SF	(United Kingdom) Andy Murray (7)	8	Win	6–3, 6–2, 6–1
French Open; Paris, France; Grand Slam tournament Clay, outdoor 25 May – 08 June 2014	67 / 116	W	(Serbia) Novak Djokovic (2)	2	Win (9)	3–6, 7–5, 6–2, 6–4
French Open; Paris, France; Grand Slam tournament Clay, outdoor 24 May – 7 June 2015
French Open; Paris, France; Grand Slam tournament Clay, outdoor 24 May – 7 June 2015	68 / 116	1R	(France) Quentin Halys (WC)	304	Win	6–3, 6–3, 6–4
French Open; Paris, France; Grand Slam tournament Clay, outdoor 24 May – 7 June 2015	69 / 116	2R	(Spain) Nicolás Almagro	154	Win	6–4, 6–3, 6–1
French Open; Paris, France; Grand Slam tournament Clay, outdoor 24 May – 7 June 2015	70 / 116	3R	(Russia) Andrey Kuznetsov	120	Win	6–1, 6–3, 6–2
French Open; Paris, France; Grand Slam tournament Clay, outdoor 24 May – 7 June 2015	71 / 116	4R	(United States) Jack Sock	37	Win	6–3, 6–1, 5–7, 6–2
French Open; Paris, France; Grand Slam tournament Clay, outdoor 24 May – 7 June 2015	72 / 116	QF	(Serbia) Novak Djokovic (1)	1	Loss	5–7, 3–6, 1–6
French Open; Paris, France; Grand Slam tournament Clay, outdoor 22 May – 5 June 2016
French Open; Paris, France; Grand Slam tournament Clay, outdoor 22 May – 5 June 2016	73 / 116	1R	(Australia) Sam Groth	95	Win	6–1, 6–1, 6–1
French Open; Paris, France; Grand Slam tournament Clay, outdoor 22 May – 5 June 2016	74 / 116	2R	(Argentina) Facundo Bagnis	99	Win	6–3, 6–0, 6–3
French Open; Paris, France; Grand Slam tournament Clay, outdoor 22 May – 5 June 2016	–	3R	(Spain) Marcel Granollers	56	Withdrew	N/A
French Open; Paris, France; Grand Slam tournament Clay, outdoor 28 May – 11 June 2017
French Open; Paris, France; Grand Slam tournament Clay, outdoor 28 May – 11 June 2017	75 / 116	1R	(France) Benoît Paire	45	Win	6–1, 6–4, 6–1
French Open; Paris, France; Grand Slam tournament Clay, outdoor 28 May – 11 June 2017	76 / 116	2R	(Netherlands) Robin Haase	46	Win	6–1, 6–4, 6–3
French Open; Paris, France; Grand Slam tournament Clay, outdoor 28 May – 11 June 2017	77 / 116	3R	(Georgia (country)) Nikoloz Basilashvili	63	Win	6–0, 6–1, 6–0
French Open; Paris, France; Grand Slam tournament Clay, outdoor 28 May – 11 June 2017	78 / 116	4R	(Spain) Roberto Bautista Agut (17)	18	Win	6–1, 6–2, 6–2
French Open; Paris, France; Grand Slam tournament Clay, outdoor 28 May – 11 June 2017	79 / 116	QF	(Spain) Pablo Carreño Busta (20)	21	Win	6–2, 2–0 RET
French Open; Paris, France; Grand Slam tournament Clay, outdoor 28 May – 11 June 2017	80 / 116	SF	(Austria) Dominic Thiem (6)	7	Win	6–3, 6–4, 6–0
French Open; Paris, France; Grand Slam tournament Clay, outdoor 28 May – 11 June 2017	81 / 116	W	(Switzerland) Stan Wawrinka (3)	3	Win (10)	6–2, 6–3, 6–1
French Open; Paris, France; Grand Slam tournament Clay, outdoor 28 May – 10 June 2018
French Open; Paris, France; Grand Slam tournament Clay, outdoor 28 May – 10 June 2018	82 / 116	1R	(Italy) Simone Bolelli (LL)	130	Win	6–4, 6–3, 7–6^{(11–9)}
French Open; Paris, France; Grand Slam tournament Clay, outdoor 28 May – 10 June 2018	83 / 116	2R	(Argentina) Guido Pella	78	Win	6–2, 6–1, 6–1
French Open; Paris, France; Grand Slam tournament Clay, outdoor 28 May – 10 June 2018	84 / 116	3R	(France) Richard Gasquet (27)	32	Win	6–3, 6–2, 6–2
French Open; Paris, France; Grand Slam tournament Clay, outdoor 28 May – 10 June 2018	85 / 116	4R	(Germany) Maximilian Marterer	70	Win	6–3, 6–2, 7–6^{(7–4)}
French Open; Paris, France; Grand Slam tournament Clay, outdoor 28 May – 10 June 2018	86 / 116	QF	(Argentina) Diego Schwartzman (11)	12	Win	4–6, 6–3, 6–2, 6–2
French Open; Paris, France; Grand Slam tournament Clay, outdoor 28 May – 10 June 2018	87 / 116	SF	(Argentina) Juan Martín del Potro (5)	6	Win	6–4, 6–1, 6–2
French Open; Paris, France; Grand Slam tournament Clay, outdoor 28 May – 10 June 2018	88 / 116	W	(Austria) Dominic Thiem (7)	8	Win (11)	6–4, 6–3, 6–2
French Open; Paris, France; Grand Slam tournament Clay, outdoor 27 May – 9 June 2019
French Open; Paris, France; Grand Slam tournament Clay, outdoor 27 May – 9 June 2019	89 / 116	1R	(Germany) Yannick Hanfmann (Q)	180	Win	6–2, 6–1, 6–3
French Open; Paris, France; Grand Slam tournament Clay, outdoor 27 May – 9 June 2019	90 / 116	2R	(Germany) Yannick Maden (Q)	114	Win	6–1, 6–2, 6–4
French Open; Paris, France; Grand Slam tournament Clay, outdoor 27 May – 9 June 2019	91 / 116	3R	(Belgium) David Goffin (27)	29	Win	6–1, 6–3, 4–6, 6–3
French Open; Paris, France; Grand Slam tournament Clay, outdoor 27 May – 9 June 2019	92 / 116	4R	(Argentina) Juan Ignacio Londero	78	Win	6–2, 6–3, 6–3
French Open; Paris, France; Grand Slam tournament Clay, outdoor 27 May – 9 June 2019	93 / 116	QF	(Japan) Kei Nishikori (7)	7	Win	6–1, 6–1, 6–3
French Open; Paris, France; Grand Slam tournament Clay, outdoor 27 May – 9 June 2019	94 / 116	SF	(Switzerland) Roger Federer (3)	3	Win	6–3, 6–4, 6–2
French Open; Paris, France; Grand Slam tournament Clay, outdoor 27 May – 9 June 2019	95 / 116	W	(Austria) Dominic Thiem (4)	4	Win (12)	6–3, 5–7, 6–1, 6–1
French Open; Paris, France; Grand Slam tournament Clay, outdoor 27 September – 11 October 2020
French Open; Paris, France; Grand Slam tournament Clay, outdoor 27 September – 11 October 2020	96 / 116	1R	(Belarus) Egor Gerasimov	83	Win	6–4, 6–4, 6–2
French Open; Paris, France; Grand Slam tournament Clay, outdoor 27 September – 11 October 2020	97 / 116	2R	(United States) Mackenzie McDonald (PR)	236	Win	6–1, 6–0, 6–3
French Open; Paris, France; Grand Slam tournament Clay, outdoor 27 September – 11 October 2020	98 / 116	3R	(Italy) Stefano Travaglia	74	Win	6–1, 6–4, 6–0
French Open; Paris, France; Grand Slam tournament Clay, outdoor 27 September – 11 October 2020	99 / 116	4R	(United States) Sebastian Korda (Q)	213	Win	6–1, 6–1, 6–2
French Open; Paris, France; Grand Slam tournament Clay, outdoor 27 September – 11 October 2020	100 / 116	QF	(Italy) Jannik Sinner	75	Win	7–6^{(7–4)}, 6–4, 6–1
French Open; Paris, France; Grand Slam tournament Clay, outdoor 27 September – 11 October 2020	101 / 116	SF	(Argentina) Diego Schwartzman (12)	14	Win	6–3, 6–3, 7–6^{(7–0)}
French Open; Paris, France; Grand Slam tournament Clay, outdoor 27 September – 11 October 2020	102 / 116	W	(Serbia) Novak Djokovic (1)	1	Win (13)	6–0, 6–2, 7–5
French Open; Paris, France; Grand Slam tournament Clay, outdoor 30 May – 13 June 2021
French Open; Paris, France; Grand Slam tournament Clay, outdoor 30 May – 13 June 2021	103 / 116	1R	(Australia) Alexei Popyrin	63	Win	6–3, 6–2, 7–6^{(7–3)}
French Open; Paris, France; Grand Slam tournament Clay, outdoor 30 May – 13 June 2021	104 / 116	2R	(France) Richard Gasquet	53	Win	6–0, 7–5, 6–2
French Open; Paris, France; Grand Slam tournament Clay, outdoor 30 May – 13 June 2021	105 / 116	3R	(United Kingdom) Cameron Norrie	45	Win	6–3, 6–3, 6–3
French Open; Paris, France; Grand Slam tournament Clay, outdoor 30 May – 13 June 2021	106 / 116	4R	(Italy) Jannik Sinner (18)	19	Win	7–5, 6–3, 6–0
French Open; Paris, France; Grand Slam tournament Clay, outdoor 30 May – 13 June 2021	107 / 116	QF	(Argentina) Diego Schwartzman (10)	10	Win	6–3, 4–6, 6–4, 6–0
French Open; Paris, France; Grand Slam tournament Clay, outdoor 30 May – 13 June 2021	108 / 116	SF	(Serbia) Novak Djokovic (1)	1	Loss	6–3, 3–6, 6–7^{(4–7)}, 2–6
French Open; Paris, France; Grand Slam tournament Clay, outdoor 22 May – 5 June 2022
French Open; Paris, France; Grand Slam tournament Clay, outdoor 22 May – 5 June 2022	109 / 116	1R	(Australia) Jordan Thompson	82	Win	6–2, 6–2, 6–2
French Open; Paris, France; Grand Slam tournament Clay, outdoor 22 May – 5 June 2022	110 / 116	2R	(France) Corentin Moutet (WC)	139	Win	6–3, 6–1, 6–4
French Open; Paris, France; Grand Slam tournament Clay, outdoor 22 May – 5 June 2022	111 / 116	3R	(Netherlands) Botic van de Zandschulp (26)	29	Win	6–3, 6–2, 6–4
French Open; Paris, France; Grand Slam tournament Clay, outdoor 22 May – 5 June 2022	112 / 116	4R	(Canada) Félix Auger-Aliassime (9)	9	Win	3–6, 6–3, 6–2, 3–6, 6–3
French Open; Paris, France; Grand Slam tournament Clay, outdoor 22 May – 5 June 2022	113 / 116	QF	(Serbia) Novak Djokovic (1)	1	Win	6–2, 4–6, 6–2, 7–6^{(7–4)}
French Open; Paris, France; Grand Slam tournament Clay, outdoor 22 May – 5 June 2022	114 / 116	SF	(Germany) Alexander Zverev (3)	3	Win	7–6^{(10–8)}, 6–6^{(0–0)} RET
French Open; Paris, France; Grand Slam tournament Clay, outdoor 22 May – 5 June 2022	115 / 116	W	(Norway) Casper Ruud (8)	8	Win (14)	6–3, 6–3, 6–0
French Open; Paris, France; Grand Slam tournament Clay, outdoor 28 May – 11 June 2023
French Open; Paris, France; Grand Slam tournament Clay, outdoor 28 May – 11 June 2023	Withdrew					
French Open; Paris, France; Grand Slam tournament Clay, outdoor 26 May – 9 June 2024
French Open; Paris, France; Grand Slam tournament Clay, outdoor 26 May – 9 June 2024	116 / 116	1R	(Germany) Alexander Zverev (4)	4	Loss	3–6, 6–7^{(5–7)}, 3–6

== Statistics ==
=== Rafael Nadal's head-to-head records at the French Open ===
Players in bold were ranked inside the top 16 at the time of at least one meeting.

- (Serbia and Montenegro) / (Serbia) **Novak Djokovic** 8–2
- (Sweden) **Robin Söderling** 3–1
- (Germany) **Alexander Zverev** 1–1
- (Switzerland) **Roger Federer** 6–0
- (Spain) **David Ferrer** 4–0
- (Austria) **Dominic Thiem** 4–0
- (Australia) **Lleyton Hewitt** 4–0
- (Spain) **Nicolás Almagro** 4–0
- (Argentina) **Diego Schwartzman** 3–0
- (France) Richard Gasquet 3–0
- (Argentina) **Juan Martín del Potro** 2–0
- (United Kingdom) **Andy Murray** 2–0
- (Switzerland) **Stan Wawrinka** 2–0
- (Japan) **Kei Nishikori** 2–0
- (Croatia) **Ivan Ljubičić** 2–0
- (Italy) Jannik Sinner 2–0
- (Brazil) Thomaz Bellucci 2–0
- (Italy) Simone Bolelli 2–0
- (Canada) **Félix Auger-Aliassime** 1–0
- (Argentina) Mariano Puerta 1–0
- (Norway) **Casper Ruud** 1–0
- (Spain) Carlos Moyá 1–0
- (France) Sébastien Grosjean 1–0
- (France) Paul-Henri Mathieu 1–0
- (Spain) Fernando Verdasco 1–0
- (Austria) Jürgen Melzer 1–0
- (Italy) Fabio Fognini 1–0
- (United States) John Isner 1–0
- (Argentina) **Juan Mónaco** 1–0
- (Germany) Lars Burgsmüller 1–0
- (Belgium) Xavier Malisse 1–0
- (United States) Kevin Kim 1–0
- (Italy) Flavio Cipolla 1–0
- (Spain) Albert Montañés 1–0
- (France) Nicolas Devilder 1–0
- (Finland) Jarkko Nieminen 1–0
- (Brazil) Marcos Daniel 1–0
- (Russia) Teymuraz Gabashvili 1–0
- (France) Gianni Mina 1–0
- (Argentina) Horacio Zeballos 1–0
- (Spain) Pablo Andújar 1–0
- (Croatia) Antonio Veić 1–0
- (Uzbekistan) Denis Istomin 1–0
- (Argentina) Eduardo Schwank 1–0
- (Germany) Daniel Brands 1–0
- (Slovakia) Martin Kližan 1–0
- (United States) Robby Ginepri 1–0
- (Argentina) Leonardo Mayer 1–0
- (Serbia) Dušan Lajović 1–0
- (France) Quentin Halys 1–0
- (Russia) Andrey Kuznetsov 1–0
- (United States) Jack Sock 1–0
- (Australia) Sam Groth 1–0
- (Argentina) Facundo Bagnis 1–0
- (France) Benoit Paire 1–0
- (Netherlands) Robin Haase 1–0
- (Georgia (country)) Nikoloz Basilashvili 1–0
- (Spain) Roberto Bautista Agut 1–0
- (Spain) Pablo Carreño Busta 1–0
- (Argentina) Guido Pella 1–0
- (Germany) Maximilian Marterer 1–0
- (Germany) Yannick Hanfmann 1–0
- (Germany) Yannick Maden 1–0
- (Belgium) David Goffin 1–0
- (Argentina) Juan Ignacio Londero 1–0
- (Belarus) Egor Gerasimov 1–0
- (United States) Mackenzie McDonald 1–0
- (Italy) Stefano Travaglia 1–0
- (United States) Sebastian Korda 1–0
- (Australia) Alexei Popyrin 1–0
- (United Kingdom) Cameron Norrie 1–0
- (Australia) Jordan Thompson 1–0
- (France) Corentin Moutet 1–0
- (Netherlands) Botic van de Zandschulp 1–0

=== By sets ===
Nadal played 372 sets during his 19 tournaments, losing just 37 sets giving him a 335-37 record, a 90.05% win rate.

=== Top 10 wins ===
Category Grand Slam (32)	Wins by surface Clay (32)	Wins by setting Outdoor (32)

#	Player	Rank	Event	Surface	Rd	Score	RNR
1/32.	(Switzerland) Roger Federer	**1**	2005 French Open	Clay	SF	6–3, 4–6, 6–4, 6–3	5
2/32.	(Croatia) Ivan Ljubičić	4	2006 French Open	Clay	SF	6–4, 6–2, 7–6^{(9–7)}	2
3/32.	(Switzerland) Roger Federer	**1**	2006 French Open	Clay	F	1–6, 6–1, 6–4, 7–6^{(7–4)}	2
4/32.	(Serbia) Novak Djokovic	6	2007 French Open	Clay	SF	7–5, 6–4, 6–2	2
5/32.	(Switzerland) Roger Federer	**1**	2007 French Open	Clay	F	6–3, 4–6, 6–3, 6–4	2
6/32.	(Serbia) Novak Djokovic	3	2008 French Open	Clay	SF	6–4, 6–2, 7–6^{7–3)}	2
7/32.	(Switzerland) Roger Federer	**1**	2008 French Open	Clay	F	6–1, 6–3, 6–0	2
8/32.	(Sweden) Robin Söderling	7	2010 French Open	Clay	F	6–4, 6–2, 6–4	2
9/32.	(Sweden) Robin Söderling	5	2011 French Open	Clay	QF	6–4, 6–1, 7–6^{(7–3)}	**1**
10/32.	(United Kingdom) Andy Murray	4	2011 French Open	Clay	SF	6–4, 7–5, 6–4	**1**
11/32.	(Switzerland) Roger Federer	3	2011 French Open	Clay	F	7–5, 7–6^{(7–3)}, 5–7, 6–1	**1**
12/32.	(Spain) David Ferrer	6	2012 French Open	Clay	SF	6–2, 6–2, 6–1	2
13/32.	(Serbia) Novak Djokovic	**1**	2012 French Open	Clay	F	6–4, 6–3, 2–6, 7–5	2
14/32.	(Switzerland) Stan Wawrinka	10	2013 French Open	Clay	QF	6–2, 6–3, 6–1	4
15/32.	(Serbia) Novak Djokovic	**1**	2013 French Open	Clay	SF	6–4, 3–6, 6–1, 6–7^{(3–7)}, 9–7	4
16/32.	(Spain) David Ferrer	5	2013 French Open	Clay	F	6–3, 6–2, 6–3	4
17/32.	(Spain) David Ferrer	5	2014 French Open	Clay	QF	4–6, 6–4, 6–0, 6–1	**1**
18/32.	(United Kingdom) Andy Murray	8	2014 French Open	Clay	SF	6–3, 6–2, 6–1	**1**
19/32.	(Serbia) Novak Djokovic	2	2014 French Open	Clay	F	3–6, 7–5, 6–2, 6–4	**1**
20/32.	(Austria) Dominic Thiem	7	2017 French Open	Clay	SF	6–3, 6–4, 6–0	4
21/32.	(Switzerland) Stan Wawrinka	3	2017 French Open	Clay	F	6–2, 6–3, 6–1	4
22/32.	(Argentina) Juan Martín del Potro	6	2018 French Open	Clay	SF	6–4, 6–1, 6–2	**1**
23/32.	(Austria) Dominic Thiem	8	2018 French Open	Clay	F	6–4, 6–3, 6–2	**1**
24/32.	(Japan) Kei Nishikori	7	2019 French Open	Clay	QF	6–1, 6–1, 6–3	2
25/32.	(Switzerland) Roger Federer	3	2019 French Open	Clay	SF	6–3, 6–4, 6–2	2
26/32.	(Austria) Dominic Thiem	4	2019 French Open	Clay	F	6–3, 5–7, 6–1, 6–1	2
27/32.	(Serbia) Novak Djokovic	**1**	2020 French Open	Clay	F	6–0, 6–2, 7–5	2
28/32.	(Argentina) Diego Schwartzman	10	2021 French Open	Clay	QF	6–3, 4–6, 6–4, 6–0	3
29/32.	(Canada) Félix Auger-Aliassime	9	2022 French Open	Clay	4R	3–6, 6–3, 6–2, 3–6, 6–3	5
30/32.	(Serbia) Novak Djokovic	**1**	2022 French Open	Clay	QF	6–2, 4–6, 6–2, 7–6^{(7–4)}	5
31/32.	(Germany) Alexander Zverev	3	2022 French Open	Clay	SF	7–6^{(10–8)}, 6–6, ret.	5
32/32.	(Norway) Casper Ruud	8	2022 French Open	Clay	F	6–3, 6–3, 6–0	5
