= 2005 French Open – Men's singles =

Men's singles
- 2005 French Open

Final
- Champion: (Spain) Rafael Nadal
- Runner-up: (Argentina) ~~Mariano Puerta~~
- Score: 6–7^{(6–8)}, 6–3, 6–1, 7–5

Details
- Draw: 128
- Seeds: 32

Events
Singles	men	women		boys	girls
Doubles	men	women	mixed	boys	girls
WC Singles	men	women	quad
WC Doubles	men	women	quad
Legends	−45	45+	women
- French Open

Rafael Nadal defeated Mariano Puerta in the final, 6–7^{(6–8)}, 6–3, 6–1, 7–5 to win the men's singles tennis title at the 2005 French Open. It was his first major title, the first of an all-time record 14 French Open titles, and the first of 22 major men's singles titles overall. Nadal won the French Open on his tournament debut, the first man to do so since Mats Wilander in 1982, and was the youngest champion since Michael Chang in 1989, aged 19 years and two days old when he won the final. It was the first time Nadal was seeded at a major.

Tournament runner-up Mariano Puerta tested positive for a prohibited substance immediately following the men's final, and was later banned from the sport for two years. As a consequence, his full results from this tournament were disqualified; though his status as a French Open finalist was not formally expunged from the record.

Gastón Gaudio was the defending champion, but lost in the fourth round to David Ferrer.

Roger Federer was attempting to complete the career Grand Slam, but was defeated in the semifinals by Nadal. It was the first of four consecutive years that Nadal defeated Federer at the tournament; Federer eventually completed the career Grand Slam in 2009.

This marked the first French Open appearance of future three-time champion Novak Djokovic, and it marked the first time he won a major match. Future champion Stan Wawrinka also made his first appearance at a major, losing in the third round to Puerta. 1999 champion Andre Agassi made his last French Open appearance, losing to Jarkko Nieminen in the first round.

== Seeds ==
1. (Switzerland) Roger Federer (semifinals)
2. (United States) Andy Roddick (second round)
3. (Russia) Marat Safin (fourth round)
4. (Spain) Rafael Nadal (champion)
5. (Argentina) Gastón Gaudio (fourth round)
6. (United States) Andre Agassi (first round)
7. (United Kingdom) Tim Henman (second round)
8. (Argentina) Guillermo Coria (fourth round)
9. (Argentina) Guillermo Cañas (quarterfinals)
10. (Argentina) David Nalbandian (fourth round)
11. (Sweden) Joachim Johansson (withdrew due to an elbow injury)
12. (Russia) Nikolay Davydenko (semifinals)
13. (Croatia) Ivan Ljubičić (first round)
14. (Spain) Carlos Moyá (fourth round)
15. (Spain) Tommy Robredo (quarterfinals)
16. (Czech Republic) Radek Štěpánek (third round)
17. (Slovakia) Dominik Hrbatý (first round)

18. (Croatia) Mario Ančić (third round)
19. (Sweden) Thomas Johansson (second round)
20. (Spain) David Ferrer (quarterfinals)
21. (Germany) Tommy Haas (third round)
22. (Chile) Nicolás Massú (first round)
23. (France) Sébastien Grosjean (fourth round)
24. (Spain) Feliciano López (first round)
25. (Chile) Fernando González (third round)
26. (Czech Republic) Jiří Novák (second round)
27. (Italy) Filippo Volandri (third round, retired due to a hand injury)
28. (Germany) Nicolas Kiefer (fourth round, withdrew due to a neck injury)
29. (Russia) Mikhail Youzhny (second round)
30. (France) Richard Gasquet (third round)
31. (Argentina) Juan Ignacio Chela (second round)
32. (Spain) Juan Carlos Ferrero (third round)
33. (Sweden) Robin Söderling (second round)

Click on the seed number of a player to go to their draw section.

== Draw ==
Key

- Q = Qualifier
- WC = Wild card
- LL = Lucky loser
- Alt = Alternate
- ITF = ITF entry
- PR = Protected ranking
- SR = Special ranking
- SE = Special exempt
- JE = Junior exempt
- JR = Junior Accelerator Programme entrant
- CO = College Accelerator Programme entrant
- NG = Next Gen Accelerator Program entrant
- w/o = Walkover
- r = Retired
- d = Defaulted

=== Finals ===
Quarterfinals
1	(Switzerland) Roger Federer	6	7^{7}	6
(Romania) Victor Hănescu	2	6^{3}	3
4	(Spain) Rafael Nadal	7	6	6
20	(Spain) David Ferrer	5	2	0
12	(Russia) Nikolay Davydenko	3	6	6	4	6
15	(Spain) Tommy Robredo	6	1	2	6	4
9	(Argentina) Guillermo Cañas	2	6	6	3	4
(Argentina) ~~Mariano Puerta~~	6	3	1	6	6

Semifinals
1	(Switzerland) Roger Federer	3	6	4	3
4	(Spain) Rafael Nadal	6	4	6	6
12	(Russia) Nikolay Davydenko	3	7	6	4	4
(Argentina) ~~Mariano Puerta~~	6	5	2	6	6

Final
4	(Spain) Rafael Nadal	6^{6}	6	6	7
(Argentina) ~~Mariano Puerta~~	7^{8}	3	1	5

=== Top half ===
==== Section 1 ====
First round
1	(Switzerland) R Federer	6	6	6
Q	(Israel) D Sela	1	4	0
(Spain) N Almagro	7^{7}	6	6
(Germany) P Kohlschreiber	6^{4}	4	3
(Belgium) C Rochus	6	2	5	2
Q	(Germany) T Behrend	4	6	7	6
(France) M Llodra	6^{3}	3	2
25	(Chile) F González	7^{7}	6	6
17	(Slovakia) D Hrbatý	7^{7}	3	6	3	6
(Serbia and Montenegro) J Tipsarević	6^{5}	6	3	6	8
LL	(United States) H Armando	6^{2}	4	6	6	3
Q	(Spain) F Vicente	7^{7}	6	2	4	6
Q	(Czech Republic) R Vik	6	7^{8}	7
(United States) K Kim	4	6^{6}	5
(Spain) A Martín	7	1	4	2
14	(Spain) C Moyá	5	6	6	6

Second round
1	(Switzerland) R Federer	6	7^{7}	6
(Spain) N Almagro	3	6^{0}	2
Q	(Germany) T Behrend	3	4	4
25	(Chile) F González	6	6	6
(Serbia and Montenegro) J Tipsarević	3	6	6^{2}	3
Q	(Spain) F Vicente	6	1	7^{7}	6
Q	(Czech Republic) R Vik	6^{6}	7^{7}	3	1
14	(Spain) C Moyá	7^{8}	6^{4}	6	6

Third round
1	(Switzerland) R Federer	7^{11}	7	6
25	(Chile) F González	6^{9}	5	2
Q	(Spain) F Vicente	4	6^{4}	7^{7}	6	4
14	(Spain) C Moyá	6	7^{7}	6^{3}	0	6

Fourth round
1	(Switzerland) R Federer	6	6	6
14	(Spain) C Moyá	1	4	3

==== Section 2 ====
First round
10	(Argentina) D Nalbandian	0	6	6	6
(Cyprus) M Baghdatis	6	4	4	4
(Czech Republic) T Berdych	6	6	6
(United States) J Morrison	3	2	4
(Spain) Ó Hernández	6^{4}	6	6	6
Q	(Spain) D Gimeno Traver	7^{7}	0	3	4
Q	(Brazil) M Daniel	2	1	6^{4}
18	(Croatia) M Ančić	6	6	7^{7}
31	(Argentina) JI Chela	3	6	6	6
(Germany) R Schüttler	6	1	4	3
(Romania) V Hănescu	6	4	6	6
(Czech Republic) M Tabara	2	6	2	1
(Peru) L Horna	7^{7}	7	6
(France) J Haehnel	6^{2}	5	3
LL	(Argentina) JP Brzezicki	2	1	4
7	(United Kingdom) T Henman	6	6	6

Second round
10	(Argentina) D Nalbandian	6	6	6
(Czech Republic) T Berdych	3	2	1
(Spain) Ó Hernández	6	1	2	3
18	(Croatia) M Ančić	4	6	6	6
31	(Argentina) JI Chela	5	1	6	5
(Romania) V Hănescu	7	6	3	7
(Peru) L Horna	7	6^{2}	6	6
7	(United Kingdom) T Henman	5	7^{7}	3	4

Third round
10	(Argentina) D Nalbandian	6	7^{7}	6
18	(Croatia) M Ančić	4	6^{4}	3
(Romania) V Hănescu	6	6	6
(Peru) L Horna	3	4	4

Fourth round
10	(Argentina) D Nalbandian	3	6	7	1	2
(Romania) V Hănescu	6	4	5	6	6

==== Section 3 ====
First round
4	(Spain) R Nadal	6	7^{7}	6
(Germany) L Burgsmüller	1	6^{4}	1
(United States) M Fish	2	1	1
(Belgium) X Malisse	6	6	6
(Netherlands) P Wessels	6	6	6
(Brazil) R Mello	4	1	3
LL	(Italy) D Bracciali	6	3	2	4
30	(France) R Gasquet	3	6	6	6
23	(France) S Grosjean	7	6	6
(Argentina) J Mónaco	5	3	1
WC	(France) T Ascione	6	7	0	3	4
(Italy) D Sanguinetti	3	5	6	6	6
(Romania) A Pavel	2	2	3
WC	(France) F Serra	6	6	6
(Thailand) P Srichaphan	6	3	1	1
16	(Czech Republic) R Štěpánek	3	6	6	6

Second round
4	(Spain) R Nadal	6	6	6
(Belgium) X Malisse	2	2	4
(Netherlands) P Wessels	3	6^{1}	1
30	(France) R Gasquet	6	7^{7}	6
23	(France) S Grosjean	6	6	6
(Italy) D Sanguinetti	0	3	2
WC	(France) F Serra	3	4	1
16	(Czech Republic) R Štěpánek	6	6	6

Third round
4	(Spain) R Nadal	6	6	6
30	(France) R Gasquet	4	3	2
23	(France) S Grosjean	6	4	3	6	6
16	(Czech Republic) R Štěpánek	1	6	6	3	4

Fourth round
4	(Spain) R Nadal	6	3	6	6
23	(France) S Grosjean	4	6	0	3

==== Section 4 ====
First round
33	(Sweden) R Söderling	1	3	6	6	6
(Spain) F Verdasco	6	6	3	3	3
(South Korea) H-t Lee	6	2	5	7^{7}	6
(Spain) Á Calatrava	4	6	7	6^{4}	4
WC	(France) G Simon	2	2	6	3
WC	(France) O Patience	6	6	4	6
(Czech Republic) J Vaněk	6	6^{8}	4	0
20	(Spain) D Ferrer	2	7^{10}	6	6
26	(Czech Republic) J Novák	4	6	6	6
(Germany) B Phau	6	2	3	1
(Spain) F Mantilla	6	6	6
(Czech Republic) T Zíb	2	1	3
PR	(Russia) D Tursunov	4	6	6	6
(Austria) S Koubek	6	1	4	1
(France) J Benneteau	5	0	1
5	(Argentina) G Gaudio	7	6	6

Second round
33	(Sweden) R Söderling	2	3	4
(South Korea) H-t Lee	6	6	6
WC	(France) O Patience	3	6^{5}	5
20	(Spain) D Ferrer	6	7^{7}	7
26	(Czech Republic) J Novák	2	6	6	5	3
(Spain) F Mantilla	6	0	3	7	6
PR	(Russia) D Tursunov
5	(Argentina) G Gaudio	w/o

Third round
(South Korea) H-t Lee	3	1	5
20	(Spain) D Ferrer	6	6	7
(Spain) F Mantilla	4	4	3
5	(Argentina) G Gaudio	6	6	6

Fourth round
20	(Spain) D Ferrer	2	6	7^{7}	5	6
5	(Argentina) G Gaudio	6	4	6^{5}	7	4

=== Bottom half ===
==== Section 5 ====
First round
8	(Argentina) G Coria	6	6	6
(Denmark) K Carlsen	4	2	4
Q	(Serbia and Montenegro) N Djokovic	6	6	6
(United States) R Ginepri	0	0	3
(Austria) J Melzer	6	6	7^{7}
(Australia) W Arthurs	4	2	6^{4}
(Luxembourg) G Müller	4	1	0
29	(Russia) M Youzhny	6	6	6
21	(Germany) T Haas	6	6	6
(Germany) F Mayer	1	2	4
(United States) V Spadea	6	7^{8}	6
(Spain) A Costa	4	6^{6}	2
(Spain) G García López	6^{4}	5	6	3
(Belgium) O Rochus	7^{7}	7	4	6
Q	(Croatia) S Tuksar	2	4	3
12	(Russia) N Davydenko	6	6	6

Second round
8	(Argentina) G Coria	4	6	3
Q	(Serbia and Montenegro) N Djokovic	6	2	2^{r}
(Austria) J Melzer	6	6	7^{7}
29	(Russia) M Youzhny	3	4	6^{5}
21	(Germany) T Haas	6	6	0
(United States) V Spadea	4	3	0^{r}
(Belgium) O Rochus	6	5	2	3
12	(Russia) N Davydenko	3	7	6	6

Third round
8	(Argentina) G Coria	6	6	7^{7}
(Austria) J Melzer	1	1	6^{2}
21	(Germany) T Haas	5	0	0
12	(Russia) N Davydenko	7	6	6

Fourth round
8	(Argentina) G Coria	6	3	6^{1}	2
12	(Russia) N Davydenko	2	6	7^{7}	6

==== Section 6 ====
First round
15	(Spain) T Robredo	4	6	6	6
WC	(Australia) P Luczak	6	3	3	3
LL	(Belgium) D Norman	6	6	6
(France) J-R Lisnard	1	1	4
(Brazil) G Kuerten	3	0	6	1
(Spain) D Sánchez	6	6	4	6
PR	(Australia) S Draper	7^{7}	1	6	0	1
19	(Sweden) T Johansson	6^{5}	6	3	6	6
32	(Spain) JC Ferrero	6	6	6
(Slovakia) K Beck	4	3	3
(France) F Santoro	6^{4}	6	1	6	4
(Czech Republic) J Hernych	7^{7}	3	6	4	6
(Sweden) T Enqvist	2	6^{3}	1
Q	(Czech Republic) L Dlouhý	6	7^{7}	6
(Netherlands) R Sluiter	1	6	4	2
3	(Russia) M Safin	6	4	6	6

Second round
15	(Spain) T Robredo	6	6	6
LL	(Belgium) D Norman	4	2	4
(Spain) D Sánchez	6	3	4	7^{7}	6
19	(Sweden) T Johansson	3	6	6	6^{4}	4
32	(Spain) JC Ferrero	6	6	6
(Czech Republic) J Hernych	4	4	2
Q	(Czech Republic) L Dlouhý	7^{8}	3	5	1
3	(Russia) M Safin	6^{6}	6	7	6

Third round
15	(Spain) T Robredo	6	6	6
(Spain) D Sánchez	4	3	1
32	(Spain) JC Ferrero	6^{5}	5	6	6^{2}
3	(Russia) M Safin	7^{7}	7	1	7^{7}

Fourth round
15	(Spain) T Robredo	7	1	6	4	8
3	(Russia) M Safin	5	6	1	6	6

==== Section 7 ====
First round
6	(United States) A Agassi	5	6	7^{8}	1	0
Q	(Finland) J Nieminen	7	4	6^{6}	6	6
(Sweden) J Björkman	6	2	2	5
(Russia) I Andreev	2	6	6	7
WC	(France) A Clément	6	6	6^{1}	6
PR	(Germany) A Popp	2	4	7^{7}	2
(Croatia) I Karlović	3	3	4
28	(Germany) N Kiefer	6	6	6
24	(Spain) F López	2	0	7^{7}	4
(France) P-H Mathieu	6	6	6^{5}	6
Q	(Australia) C Guccione	6	2	6	3	6
(Spain) S Ventura	3	6	1	6	2
(Spain) Á Montañés	6	6	6
(Armenia) S Sargsian	1	4	0
WC	(France) G Monfils	3	1	0
9	(Argentina) G Cañas	6	6	6

Second round
Q	(Finland) J Nieminen	2	4	7^{7}	2
(Russia) I Andreev	6	6	6^{3}	6
WC	(France) A Clément	6	2	2	6	4
28	(Germany) N Kiefer	4	6	6	4	6
(France) P-H Mathieu	6	6	6
Q	(Australia) C Guccione	3	4	4
(Spain) Á Montañés	1	3	4
9	(Argentina) G Cañas	6	6	6

Third round
(Russia) I Andreev	4	6^{7}	6	4
28	(Germany) N Kiefer	6	7^{9}	3	6
(France) P-H Mathieu	3	6^{4}	6	7^{7}	6
9	(Argentina) G Cañas	6	7^{7}	2	6^{5}	8

Fourth round
28	(Germany) N Kiefer
9	(Argentina) G Cañas	w/o

==== Section 8 ====
First round
13	(Croatia) I Ljubičić	5	5	2
(Argentina) ~~M Puerta~~	7	7	6
Q	(France) A Dupuis	4	1	2
Q	(Belgium) K Vliegen	6	6	6
Q	(Italy) T Tenconi	2	4	6^{8}
Q	(United States) J Blake	6	6	7^{10}
Q	(Switzerland) S Wawrinka	6^{4}	6	6	6
22	(Chile) N Massú	7^{7}	2	2	4
27	(Italy) F Volandri	6	6	6
(France) C Saulnier	0	2	1
(United Kingdom) G Rusedski	2	6^{7}	3
LL	(Brazil) F Saretta	6	7^{9}	6
(Argentina) J Acasuso	6	7^{11}	6
(Belarus) M Mirnyi	4	6^{9}	2
WC	(France) J-W Tsonga	3	2	4
2	(United States) A Roddick	6	6	6

Second round
(Argentina) ~~M Puerta~~	6	7	6
Q	(Belgium) K Vliegen	3	5	2
Q	(United States) J Blake	7^{11}	7	1	3	4
Q	(Switzerland) S Wawrinka	6^{9}	5	6	6	6
27	(Italy) F Volandri	6	6	6
LL	(Brazil) F Saretta	4	1	2
(Argentina) J Acasuso	3	4	6	6	8
2	(United States) A Roddick	6	6	4	3	6

Third round
(Argentina) ~~M Puerta~~	1	6	6	6
Q	(Switzerland) S Wawrinka	6	3	1	4
27	(Italy) F Volandri	0^{r}
(Argentina) J Acasuso	3

Fourth round
(Argentina) ~~M Puerta~~	6	6	6
(Argentina) J Acasuso	4	1	1

Preceded by 2005 Australian Open – Men's singles	Grand Slam men's singles	Succeeded by 2005 Wimbledon Championships – Men's singles
