= 2009 French Open – Men's singles =

Men's singles
- 2009 French Open

Final
- Champion: (Switzerland) Roger Federer
- Runner-up: (Sweden) Robin Söderling
- Score: 6–1, 7–6^{(7–1)}, 6–4

Details
- Draw: 128
- Seeds: 32

Events
Singles	men	women		boys	girls
Doubles	men	women	mixed	boys	girls
WC Singles	men	women	quad
WC Doubles	men	women	quad
Legends	−45	45+	women
- French Open

Roger Federer defeated Robin Söderling in the final, 6–1, 7–6^{(7–1)}, 6–4 to win the men's singles tennis title at the 2009 French Open. It was his first French Open title and 14th major title overall, completing the career Grand Slam at 27 years, 9 months and 30 days old, and equaling Pete Sampras's all-time record of men's singles major titles. It was Federer's fourth consecutive French Open final, having lost the previous three to Rafael Nadal. Söderling was the first Swedish major finalist since Thomas Johansson at the 2002 Australian Open.

Nadal was the four-time defending champion, but lost in the fourth round to Söderling. It was Nadal's first defeat at the French Open, having won the title in all four previous appearances since debuting in 2005 and winning his first 31 matches. His loss guaranteed a first-time French Open champion. In the ten-year span from 2005 to 2014, this was the only edition of the French Open not won by Nadal. Söderling's victory is widely regarded as one of the biggest upsets in tennis history.

Until the 2016 Wimbledon Championships, this was the last major where Novak Djokovic failed to reach the quarterfinals. He lost to Philipp Kohlschreiber in the third round.

This marked the final major appearance of 2004 champion and former world No. 5 Gastón Gaudio. He was defeated by Radek Štěpánek in the first round.

== Seeds ==
1. (Spain) Rafael Nadal (fourth round)
2. (Switzerland) Roger Federer (champion)
3. (United Kingdom) Andy Murray (quarterfinals)
4. (Serbia) Novak Djokovic (third round)
5. (Argentina) Juan Martín del Potro (semifinals)
6. (United States) Andy Roddick (fourth round)
7. (France) Gilles Simon (third round)
8. (Spain) Fernando Verdasco (fourth round)
9. (France) Jo-Wilfried Tsonga (fourth round)
10. (Russia) Nikolay Davydenko (quarterfinals)
11. (France) Gaël Monfils (quarterfinals)
12. (Chile) Fernando González (semifinals)
13. (Croatia) Marin Čilić (fourth round)
14. (Spain) David Ferrer (third round)
15. (United States) James Blake (first round)
16. (Spain) Tommy Robredo (quarterfinals)

17. (Switzerland) Stan Wawrinka (third round)
18. (Czech Republic) Radek Štěpánek (third round)
19. (Czech Republic) Tomáš Berdych (first round)
20. (Russia) Marat Safin (second round)
21. (Russia) Dmitry Tursunov (first round)
22. (United States) Mardy Fish (first round)
23. (Sweden) Robin Söderling (finals)
24. (Austria) Jürgen Melzer (third round)
25. (Russia) Igor Andreev (third round)
26. (Croatia) Ivo Karlović (first round)
27. (Germany) Rainer Schüttler (first round)
28. (Spain) Feliciano López (second round)
29. (Germany) Philipp Kohlschreiber (fourth round)
30. (Romania) Victor Hănescu (fourth round)
31. (Spain) Nicolás Almagro (third round)
32. (France) Paul-Henri Mathieu (third round)

Click on the seed number of a player to go to their draw section.

== Draw ==
Key

- Q = Qualifier
- WC = Wild card
- LL = Lucky loser
- Alt = Alternate
- ITF = ITF entry
- PR = Protected ranking
- SR = Special ranking
- SE = Special exempt
- JE = Junior exempt
- JR = Junior Accelerator Programme entrant
- CO = College Accelerator Programme entrant
- NG = Next Gen Accelerator Program entrant
- w/o = Walkover
- r = Retired
- d = Defaulted

=== Finals ===
Quarterfinals
23	(Sweden) Robin Söderling	6	6	6
10	(Russia) Nikolay Davydenko	1	3	1
3	(United Kingdom) Andy Murray	3	6	0	4
12	(Chile) Fernando González	6	3	6	6
5	(Argentina) Juan Martín del Potro	6	6	6
16	(Spain) Tommy Robredo	3	4	2
11	(France) Gaël Monfils	6^{6}	2	4
2	(Switzerland) Roger Federer	7^{8}	6	6

Semifinals
23	(Sweden) Robin Söderling	6	7	5	4	6
12	(Chile) Fernando González	3	5	7	6	4
5	(Argentina) Juan Martín del Potro	6	6^{2}	6	1	4
2	(Switzerland) Roger Federer	3	7^{7}	2	6	6

Final
23	(Sweden) Robin Söderling	1	6^{1}	4
2	(Switzerland) Roger Federer	6	7^{7}	6

=== Top half ===
==== Section 1 ====
First round
1	(Spain) R Nadal	7	6	6
Q	(Brazil) M Daniel	5	4	3
(Russia) I Kunitsyn	7^{8}	6^{5}	3	1
(Russia) T Gabashvili	6^{6}	7^{7}	6	6
(Germany) D Gremelmayr	3	3	2
(Kazakhstan) A Golubev	6	6	6
(Australia) L Hewitt	6^{1}	6^{4}	7^{7}	6	6
26	(Croatia) I Karlović	7^{7}	7^{7}	6^{4}	4	3
23	(Sweden) R Söderling	7^{7}	7^{7}	6
(United States) K Kim	6^{4}	6^{4}	2
(Uzbekistan) D Istomin	6	6^{2}	6	7^{7}
Q	(Colombia) S Giraldo	3	7^{7}	3	6^{4}
Q	(Serbia) I Bozoljac	6^{4}	6	5	4
(Germany) N Kiefer	7^{7}	3	7	6
(Portugal) F Gil	2	4	4
14	(Spain) D Ferrer	6	6	6

Second round
1	(Spain) R Nadal	6	6	6
(Russia) T Gabashvili	1	4	2
(Kazakhstan) A Golubev	4	3	1
(Australia) L Hewitt	6	6	6
23	(Sweden) R Söderling	6	7^{7}	6
(Uzbekistan) D Istomin	4	6^{4}	4
(Germany) N Kiefer	3	7	4	6	2
14	(Spain) D Ferrer	6	5	6	3	6

Third round
1	(Spain) R Nadal	6	6	6
(Australia) L Hewitt	1	3	1
23	(Sweden) R Söderling	6^{5}	7	6	7^{7}
14	(Spain) D Ferrer	7^{7}	5	2	6^{5}

Fourth round
1	(Spain) R Nadal	2	7^{7}	4	6^{2}
23	(Sweden) R Söderling	6	6^{2}	6	7^{7}

==== Section 2 ====
First round
10	(Russia) N Davydenko	6	6	6
PR	(Austria) S Koubek	2	1	4
(Argentina) D Junqueira	3	7	6	6
(Chile) P Capdeville	6	5	1	3
(Chile) N Massú	6	6	1	2	6
(Austria) D Köllerer	3	4	6	6	3
(France) N Devilder	3	7	6	4	4
17	(Switzerland) S Wawrinka	6	5	2	6	6
31	(Spain) N Almagro	6	6	6
(Argentina) A Calleri	4	1	3
(Latvia) E Gulbis	7^{7}	6	3	6
(United States) S Querrey	6^{1}	1	6	1
Q	(Canada) P Polansky	7	2	6^{4}	6	3
(Germany) P Petzschner	5	6	7^{7}	4	6
(France) F Serra	2	1	4
8	(Spain) F Verdasco	6	6	6

Second round
10	(Russia) N Davydenko	4	6	6	6
(Argentina) D Junqueira	6	3	0	2
(Chile) N Massú	1	1	2
17	(Switzerland) S Wawrinka	6	6	6
31	(Spain) N Almagro	6^{4}	7^{7}	6	6
(Latvia) E Gulbis	7^{7}	6^{5}	3	2
(Germany) P Petzschner	1	2	3
8	(Spain) F Verdasco	6	6	6

Third round
10	(Russia) N Davydenko	6	4	6	6
17	(Switzerland) S Wawrinka	3	6	3	2
31	(Spain) N Almagro	2	6^{4}	6^{8}
8	(Spain) F Verdasco	6	7^{6}	7^{10}

Fourth round
10	(Russia) N Davydenko	6	6	6
8	(Spain) F Verdasco	2	2	4

==== Section 3 ====
First round
3	(United Kingdom) A Murray	6	6	6
PR	(Argentina) JI Chela	2	2	1
(Germany) M Zverev	7^{7}	5	0^{r}
(Italy) P Starace	6^{5}	7	1
(Serbia) J Tipsarević	3	7^{7}	7^{7}	6
(Spain) A Montañés	6	6^{3}	6^{5}	4
Q	(Brazil) F Ferreiro	7^{7}	6	6^{4}	5	2
28	(Spain) F López	6^{3}	4	7^{7}	7	6
18	(Czech Republic) R Štěpánek	6	6	6
WC	(Argentina) G Gaudio	3	4	1
(Chinese Taipei) Y-h Lu	2	0^{r}
LL	(France) M Montcourt	6	0
(Israel) D Sela	6	6	4	6
Q	(Monaco) J-R Lisnard	4	3	6	3
(Czech Republic) J Hernych	0	4	3
13	(Croatia) M Čilić	6	6	6

Second round
3	(United Kingdom) A Murray	6	2	7	6
(Italy) P Starace	3	6	5	4
(Serbia) J Tipsarević	6^{9}	6	7^{7}	6
28	(Spain) F López	7^{11}	4	6^{4}	3
18	(Czech Republic) R Štěpánek	6	4	6	6
LL	(France) M Montcourt	4	6	4	4
(Israel) D Sela	0	3	1
13	(Croatia) M Čilić	6	6	6

Third round
3	(United Kingdom) A Murray	7^{7}	6	0
(Serbia) J Tipsarević	6^{3}	3	0^{r}
18	(Czech Republic) R Štěpánek	1	6^{4}	3
13	(Croatia) M Čilić	6	7^{7}	6

Fourth round
3	(United Kingdom) A Murray	7	7^{7}	6
13	(Croatia) M Čilić	5	6^{4}	1

==== Section 4 ====
First round
12	(Chile) F González	6	6	6
Q	(Czech Republic) J Vaněk	3	2	3
Q	(Portugal) R Machado	6	6	4	2	6
(Belgium) K Vliegen	2	4	6	6	3
(Spain) M Granollers	5	6	6	6^{2}	1
WC	(France) J Ouanna	7	2	3	7^{7}	6
WC	(France) A Sidorenko	4	4	4
20	(Russia) M Safin	6	6	6
30	(Romania) V Hănescu	7^{10}	7^{7}	7^{7}
(Belgium) S Darcis	6^{8}	6^{5}	6^{3}
(Russia) M Youzhny	7^{7}	6	6
(Luxembourg) G Müller	6^{2}	1	4
Q	(Germany) D Brands	7^{9}	5	6^{11}	6	3
(United States) R Kendrick	6^{7}	7	7^{13}	4	6
(United States) W Odesnik	6	5	2	6	3
7	(France) G Simon	3	7	6	4	6

Second round
12	(Chile) F González	6	6	6
Q	(Portugal) R Machado	3	2	3
WC	(France) J Ouanna	7^{7}	7^{7}	4	3	10
20	(Russia) M Safin	6^{2}	6^{4}	6	6	8
30	(Romania) V Hănescu	7	7	7
(Russia) M Youzhny	5	5	5
(United States) R Kendrick	5	0	1
7	(France) G Simon	7	6	6

Third round
12	(Chile) F González	7	6	7
WC	(France) J Ouanna	5	3	5
30	(Romania) V Hănescu	6	6	6
7	(France) G Simon	4	4	2

Fourth round
12	(Chile) F González	6	6	6
30	(Romania) V Hănescu	2	4	2

=== Bottom half ===
==== Section 5 ====
First round
5	(Argentina) JM del Potro	6	6	6
(France) M Llodra	3	3	1
(Serbia) V Troicki	3	6	6	6^{4}	6
Q	(Poland) Ł Kubot	6	3	4	7^{7}	3
(Brazil) T Bellucci	4	7^{7}	5^{r}
(Argentina) M Vassallo Argüello	6	6^{4}	5
Q	(Italy) F Fognini	6	3	1	6	5
25	(Russia) I Andreev	1	6	6	3	7
21	(Russia) D Tursunov	3	6	4	1
(France) A Clément	6	3	6	6
(France) F Santoro	3	1	6	4
(Belgium) C Rochus	6	6	3	6
(Cyprus) M Baghdatis	3	2	4
(Argentina) J Mónaco	6	6	6
(France) J Benneteau	4	6	3	4
9	(France) J-W Tsonga	6	3	6	6

Second round
5	(Argentina) JM del Potro	6	7	6
(Serbia) V Troicki	3	5	0
(Argentina) M Vassallo Argüello	6	5	7	3	4
25	(Russia) I Andreev	1	7	5	6	6
(France) A Clément	1	5	6	3
(Belgium) C Rochus	6	7	4	6
(Argentina) J Mónaco	5	6	1	6^{8}
9	(France) J-W Tsonga	7	2	6	7^{10}

Third round
5	(Argentina) JM del Potro	6	7	6
25	(Russia) I Andreev	4	5	4
(Belgium) C Rochus	2	2	2
9	(France) J-W Tsonga	6	6	6

Fourth round
5	(Argentina) JM del Potro	6	6^{5}	6	6
9	(France) J-W Tsonga	1	7^{7}	1	4

==== Section 6 ====
First round
16	(Spain) T Robredo	6	6	6
WC	(France) A Mannarino	2	1	2
(Russia) E Korolev	4	0^{r}
(Spain) D Gimeno Traver	6	0
(Spain) G García López	3	3	1
(Italy) A Seppi	6	6	6
(Argentina) M González	6	1	6	7^{7}
22	(United States) M Fish	3	6	4	6^{4}
29	(Germany) P Kohlschreiber	6	6	6
WC	(Australia) B Tomic	1	2	2
(Spain) JC Ferrero	2	6	6	3	6
(Croatia) I Ljubičić	6	4	4	6	3
(Argentina) B Dabul	6	5	6^{2}	3
Q	(Ukraine) S Stakhovsky	4	7	7^{7}	6
(Ecuador) N Lapentti	3	1^{r}
4	(Serbia) N Djokovic	6	3

Second round
16	(Spain) T Robredo	6	6	6
(Spain) D Gimeno Traver	4	4	3
(Italy) A Seppi	6^{8}	3	3
(Argentina) M González	7^{10}	6	6
29	(Germany) P Kohlschreiber	6	2	6	6^{3}	6
(Spain) JC Ferrero	4	6	4	7^{7}	3
Q	(Ukraine) S Stakhovsky	3	4	1
4	(Serbia) N Djokovic	6	6	6

Third round
16	(Spain) T Robredo	4	7	6	6
(Argentina) M González	6	5	1	0
29	(Germany) P Kohlschreiber	6	6	6
4	(Serbia) N Djokovic	4	4	4

Fourth round
16	(Spain) T Robredo	6	5	7^{7}	6
29	(Germany) P Kohlschreiber	4	7	6^{4}	2

==== Section 7 ====
First round
6	(United States) A Roddick	6	6	6
WC	(France) R Jouan	2	4	2
(Spain) Ó Hernández	3	6^{4}	3
(Czech Republic) I Minář	6	7^{7}	6
(Spain) I Navarro	6^{9}	4	1
(Germany) A Beck	7^{11}	6	6
(France) M Gicquel	6	6	6
27	(Germany) R Schüttler	0	0	4
24	(Austria) J Melzer	6	7^{7}	6
(Argentina) S Roitman	4	6^{4}	0
WC	(France) G Rufin	6	6	6
(Argentina) E Schwank	1	3	3
Q	(Romania) V Crivoi	6	7^{7}	6
Q	(Germany) S Greul	1	6^{1}	2
(United States) B Reynolds	2	3	1
11	(France) G Monfils	6	6	6

Second round
6	(United States) A Roddick	6	6	7^{7}
(Czech Republic) I Minář	2	2	6^{2}
(Germany) A Beck	4	7^{8}	6^{3}	5
(France) M Gicquel	6	6^{6}	7^{7}	7
24	(Austria) J Melzer	6	7	6
WC	(France) G Rufin	2	5	4
Q	(Romania) V Crivoi	4	3	3
11	(France) G Monfils	6	6	6

Third round
6	(United States) A Roddick	6	6	6
(France) M Gicquel	1	4	4
24	(Austria) J Melzer	2	6	3	1
11	(France) G Monfils	6	4	6	6

Fourth round
6	(United States) A Roddick	4	2	3
11	(France) G Monfils	6	6	6

==== Section 8 ====
First round
15	(United States) J Blake	6^{6}	5	2
Q	(Argentina) L Mayer	7^{8}	7	6
PR	(Romania) A Pavel	1	4	4
(Germany) T Haas	6	6	6
LL	(Brazil) T Alves	2	6^{10}	3
(France) J Chardy	6	7^{12}	6
(Italy) S Bolelli	6	6	5	4	6
19	(Czech Republic) T Berdych	4	4	7	6	3
32	(France) P-H Mathieu	6	6	6
WC	(France) L Recouderc	4	4	1
(United States) R Ginepri	4	6^{7}	6^{3}
(Spain) P Andújar	6	7^{9}	7^{7}
(Argentina) J Acasuso	3	7^{7}	6	6
Q	(Spain) S Ventura	6	6^{5}	0	3
(Spain) A Martín	4	3	2
2	(Switzerland) R Federer	6	6	6

Second round
Q	(Argentina) L Mayer	3	6^{2}	6	6	3
(Germany) T Haas	6	7^{7}	3	4	6
(France) J Chardy	6	6	4	4	6
(Italy) S Bolelli	2	3	6	6	1
32	(France) P-H Mathieu	6	6	6
(Spain) P Andújar	2	3	4
(Argentina) J Acasuso	6^{8}	7	6^{2}	2
2	(Switzerland) R Federer	7^{10}	5	7^{7}	6

Third round
(Germany) T Haas	7	6	4	6
(France) J Chardy	5	3	6	4
32	(France) P-H Mathieu	6	1	4	4
2	(Switzerland) R Federer	4	6	6	6

Fourth round
(Germany) T Haas	7^{7}	7	4	0	2
2	(Switzerland) R Federer	6^{4}	5	6	6	6

Preceded by 2009 Australian Open – Men's singles	Grand Slam men's singles	Succeeded by 2009 Wimbledon Championships – Men's singles
