= 2016 Mubadala World Tennis Championship (December) =

- Date: 29–31 December 2016
- Edition: 9th
- Surface: Hard
- Location: Abu Dhabi, United Arab Emirates
- Venue: Abu Dhabi International Tennis Complex

Champions

Singles
- (Spain) Rafael Nadal
← 2016 ·	Mubadala World Tennis Championship	· 2017 →

The 2016 Mubadala World Tennis Championship was a non-ATP affiliated exhibition tournament. It was the 9th edition of the Mubadala World Tennis Championship with the world's top players competing in the event, held in a knockout format. The prize money for the winner was $250,000. The event was held at the Abu Dhabi International Tennis Complex at the Zayed Sports City in Abu Dhabi, United Arab Emirates.

Andy Murray (world number 1) and Milos Raonic (number 3) received byes to the semi-final.

== Champion ==
- (Spain) Rafael Nadal def. (Belgium) David Goffin, 6–4, 7–6^{(7–5)}

== Players ==
Country	Player	Ranking	Seeding
GBR	Andy Murray	1	1
CAN	Milos Raonic	3	2
ESP	Rafael Nadal	9	3
CZE	Tomáš Berdych	10	4
BEL	David Goffin	11	5
FRA	Jo-Wilfried Tsonga	12	6
