= 2013 Mubadala World Tennis Championship =

- Date: 26–28 December 2013
- Edition: 6th
- Surface: Hard
- Location: Abu Dhabi, United Arab Emirates
- Venue: Abu Dhabi International Tennis Complex

Champions

Singles
- (Serbia) Novak Djokovic
← 2012 ·	Mubadala World Tennis Championship	· 2015 →

The 2013 Mubadala World Tennis Championship was a non-ATP affiliated exhibition tournament. It was the 6th edition of the Mubadala World Tennis Championship with the world's top players competing in the event, which was held in a knockout format. The winner received a purse of $250,000. The event was held at the Abu Dhabi International Tennis Complex at the Zayed Sports City in Abu Dhabi, United Arab Emirates. It was a warm-up event for the 2014 tennis season, with the ATP World Tour beginning on December 30, 2013.

== Players ==
Country	Player	Ranking	Seeding
ESP	Rafael Nadal	1	1
SRB	Novak Djokovic	2	2
ESP	David Ferrer	3	3
GBR	Andy Murray	4	4
SUI	Stanislas Wawrinka	8	5
FRA	Jo-Wilfried Tsonga	10	6

Players List confirmed on 8 October

== Champion ==
(Serbia) Novak Djokovic def. (Spain) David Ferrer, 7–5, 6–2

- Djokovic wins his third title in Abu Dhabi.
