= 2015 Mubadala World Tennis Championship =

Tennis tournament in Abu Dhabi, UAE

- Date: 1–3 January 2015
- Edition: 7th
- Surface: Hard
- Location: Abu Dhabi, United Arab Emirates
- Venue: Abu Dhabi International Tennis Complex

Champions

Singles
- (United Kingdom) Andy Murray
← 2013 ·	Mubadala World Tennis Championship	· 2016 →

The 2015 Mubadala World Tennis Championship was a non-ATP affiliated exhibition tournament. It was the 7th edition of the Mubadala World Tennis Championship with the world's top players competing in the event, which was held in a knockout format. The winner received a purse of $250,000. The event was held at the Abu Dhabi International Tennis Complex at the Zayed Sports City in Abu Dhabi, United Arab Emirates.

== Players ==
Country	Player	Ranking	Seeding
SRB	Novak Djokovic	1	1
ESP	Rafael Nadal	3	2
SWI	Stan Wawrinka	4	3
GBR	Andy Murray	6	4
ESP	Feliciano López	14	5
ESP	Nicolás Almagro	71	6

== Champion ==
(United Kingdom) Andy Murray def. (Serbia) Novak Djokovic by walkover

- Murray wins his second title in Abu Dhabi.
