= 2012 Mubadala World Tennis Championship – Singles =

Singles
- 2012 Mubadala World Tennis Championship

Final
- Champion: (Serbia) Novak Djokovic
- Runner-up: (Spain) Nicolás Almagro
- Score: 6–7^{(4–7)}, 6–3, 6-4
← 2011 ·	Mubadala World Tennis Championship	· 2013 →

Novak Djokovic was the defending champion, and won in the final 6–7^{(4–7)}, 6–3, 6–4 against Nicolás Almagro.

== Seeds ==
1. (Serbia) Novak Djokovic (champion)
2. (Spain) Rafael Nadal (withdrew)
3. (United Kingdom) Andy Murray (quarterfinals)
4. (Spain) David Ferrer (semifinals, Third)
5. (Czech Republic) Tomáš Berdych (quarterfinals)
6. (Serbia) Janko Tipsarević (semifinals, Fourth)

== Draw ==
=== Key ===
- Q = Qualifier
- WC = Wild card
- LL = Lucky loser
- Alt = Alternate
- ITF = ITF entry
- PR = Protected ranking
- SR = Special ranking
- SE = Special exempt
- JE = Junior exempt
- JR = Junior Accelerator Programme entrant
- CO = College Accelerator Programme entrant
- NG = Next Gen Accelerator Program entrant
- w/o = Walkover
- r = Retired
- d = Defaulted

=== Draw ===
Quarterfinals
1	(Serbia) Novak Djokovic
bye
4	(Spain) David Ferrer	6	6
5	(Czech Republic) Tomáš Berdych	2	4
6	(Serbia) Janko Tipsarević	6	6
3	(United Kingdom) Andy Murray	3	4
bye
Alt	(Spain) Nicolás Almagro

Semifinals
1	(Serbia) Novak Djokovic	6	6
4	(Spain) David Ferrer	0	3
Alt	(Spain) Nicolás Almagro	2	7^{7}	6
6	(Serbia) Janko Tipsarević	6	6^{3}	2

Final
1	(Serbia) Novak Djokovic	6^{4}	6	6
Alt	(Spain) Nicolás Almagro	7^{7}	3	4
Third Place Match
4	(Spain) David Ferrer	7^{7}	6
6	(Serbia) Janko Tipsarević	6^{4}	2
