= 2010 Capitala World Tennis Championship =

- Date: 31 Dec 2009 – 2 Jan 2010
- Edition: 2nd
- Surface: Hard
- Location: Abu Dhabi, United Arab Emirates
- Venue: Abu Dhabi International Tennis Complex

Champions

Singles
- (Spain) Rafael Nadal
← 2009 ·	Capitala World Tennis Championship	· 2011 →

The 2010 Capitala World Tennis Championship was a non-ATP affiliated exhibition tournament. Four of the world's top ten were competing in the knockout event, which had prize money of $250,000 to the winner. The event was held at the Abu Dhabi International Tennis Complex at the Zayed Sports City in Abu Dhabi, UAE. It served as a warm-up event for the season, with the ATP World Tour beginning on January 4, 2010.

== Players ==
1. (Switzerland) Roger Federer ATP No.1
2. (Spain) Rafael Nadal ATP No.2
3. (Russia) Nikolay Davydenko ATP No.6
4. (Sweden) Robin Söderling ATP No.8
5. (Spain) David Ferrer ATP No.17
6. (Switzerland) Stanislas Wawrinka ATP No.21

== Results ==
Quarterfinals
4	(Sweden) Robin Söderling	7^{7}	7^{7}
6	(Switzerland) Stanislas Wawrinka	6^{4}	6^{2}
5	(Spain) David Ferrer	2	6	6
3	(Russia) Nikolay Davydenko	6	2	4

Semifinals
1	(Switzerland) Roger Federer	7^{8}	6^{1}	2
4	(Sweden) Robin Söderling	6^{6}	7^{7}	6
5	(Spain) David Ferrer	6^{3}	3
2	(Spain) Rafael Nadal	7^{7}	6

Final
4	(Sweden) Robin Söderling	6^{3}	5
2	(Spain) Rafael Nadal	7^{7}	7
Third Place Match
1	(Switzerland) Roger Federer	6	7
5	(Spain) David Ferrer	1	5

- It was Nadal's first win at the event after finishing runner-up to Andy Murray in the previous edition. It drew him with Murray as the most successful players at the event with one title each.
