= 2016 Mubadala World Tennis Championship – Singles =

Singles
- 2016 Mubadala World Tennis Championship

Final
- Champion: (Spain) Rafael Nadal
- Runner-up: (Canada) Milos Raonic
- Score: 7^{7}–6^{2}, 6–3
← 2015 ·	Mubadala World Tennis Championship	· 2017 →

Andy Murray was the competition's defending champion, but he didn't participate.

Rafael Nadal won the title beating Milos Raonic in the final.

== Seeds ==
1. (Switzerland) Stan Wawrinka (fourth place)
2. (Spain) Rafael Nadal (champion)

== Draw ==
=== Key ===
- Q = Qualifier
- WC = Wild card
- LL = Lucky loser
- Alt = Alternate
- ITF = ITF entry
- PR = Protected ranking
- SR = Special ranking
- SE = Special exempt
- JE = Junior exempt
- JR = Junior Accelerator Programme entrant
- CO = College Accelerator Programme entrant
- NG = Next Gen Accelerator Program entrant
- w/o = Walkover
- r = Retired
- d = Defaulted

=== Draw ===
Quarterfinals
1	(Switzerland) Stan Wawrinka
bye
(Canada) Milos Raonic	6	6
(South Africa) Kevin Anderson	3	4
(France) Jo-Wilfried Tsonga	1	1
(Spain) David Ferrer	6	6
bye
2	(Spain) Rafael Nadal

Semifinals
1	(Switzerland) Stan Wawrinka	5	5
(Canada) Milos Raonic	7	7
(Spain) David Ferrer	3	7^{7}	3
2	(Spain) Rafael Nadal	6	6^{4}	6

Final
(Canada) Milos Raonic	6^{2}	3
2	(Spain) Rafael Nadal	7^{7}	6
Third Place Match
1	(Switzerland) Stan Wawrinka	7^{7}	4	[8]
(Spain) David Ferrer	6^{1}	6	[10]

=== Play-offs ===
Fifth Place Match
(South Africa) Kevin Anderson	6^{4}	6^{3}
(Spain) Feliciano López	7^{7}	7^{7}

- Feliciano López replaces injured Jo-Wilfried Tsonga at Mubadala World Tennis Championship
