= 2017 Mubadala World Tennis Championship =

- Date: 28–30 December 2017
- Edition: 10th
- Surface: Hard
- Location: Abu Dhabi, United Arab Emirates
- Venue: International Tennis Centre

Champions

Men's singles
- (South Africa) Kevin Anderson

Women's singles
- (Latvia) Jeļena Ostapenko
← 2016 ·	Mubadala World Tennis Championship	· 2018 →

The 2017 Mubadala World Tennis Championship was a non-ATP/WTA-affiliated exhibition tennis tournament. It was the 10th edition of the Mubadala World Tennis Championship with the world's top players competing in the event, held in a knockout format. The prize money for the winner was $250,000. The event was held at the International Tennis Centre at the Zayed Sports City in Abu Dhabi, United Arab Emirates.

== Champions ==
=== Men's singles ===
- (South Africa) Kevin Anderson def. (Spain) Roberto Bautista Agut, 6–4, 7–6^{(7–0)}

=== Women's singles ===
- (Latvia) Jeļena Ostapenko def. (United States) Serena Williams, 6–2, 3–6, [10–5]

== Players ==
=== Men's singles ===
Country	Player	Ranking	Seed
AUT	Dominic Thiem	5	1
ESP	Pablo Carreño Busta	10	2
~~SRB~~	~~Novak Djokovic~~	~~12~~	~~3~~
RSA	Kevin Anderson	14	4
ESP	Roberto Bautista Agut	20	5
RUS	Andrey Rublev	39	6

==== Withdrawals ====
Before the tournament

- (Spain) Rafael Nadal → replaced by (Spain) Roberto Bautista Agut
- (Switzerland) Stan Wawrinka → replaced by (South Africa) Kevin Anderson
- (Canada) Milos Raonic → replaced by (Russia) Andrey Rublev

During the tournament

- (Serbia) Novak Djokovic → replaced by (United Kingdom) Andy Murray (for a one-set exhibition match against (Spain) Roberto Bautista Agut)

=== Women's singles ===
Country	Player	Ranking	Seeding
LAT	Jeļena Ostapenko	7	1
USA	Serena Williams	22	2
