= 2021 Mubadala World Tennis Championship =

Tennis competition

- Date: 16–18 December 2021
- Edition: 13th
- Surface: Hard
- Location: Abu Dhabi, United Arab Emirates
- Venue: International Tennis Centre

Champions

Men's singles
- (Russia) Andrey Rublev

Women's singles
- (Tunisia) Ons Jabeur
- Mubadala World Tennis Championship

The 2021 Mubadala World Tennis Championship was a non-ATP/WTA-affiliated exhibition tennis tournament. It was the 13th edition of the Mubadala World Tennis Championship with some of the world's top-ranked players competing in the event, held in a knockout format. The winner received $250,000 in prize money. The event was held at the International Tennis Centre at the Zayed Sports City in Abu Dhabi, United Arab Emirates. It served as a warm-up event for the upcoming season, with the 2022 ATP Tour beginning on January 1, 2022.

Andrey Rublev (ranked No. 5) and Rafael Nadal (ranked No. 6) received byes into the semifinal. Rublev defeated Andy Murray, 6–4, 7–6^{(7–2)}, to win the men's tournament. Emma Raducanu withdrew from the event the week of her scheduled match after testing positive for COVID-19 and she was replaced by Ons Jabeur, who defeated Belinda Bencic, 4–6, 6–3, [10–8], to win the women's tournament.

== Champions ==
=== Men's singles ===
- (Russia) Andrey Rublev def. (United Kingdom) Andy Murray 6–4, 7–6^{(7–2)}.

=== Women's singles ===
- (Tunisia) Ons Jabeur def. (Switzerland) Belinda Bencic 4–6, 6–3, [10–8].

=== Day-by-day summaries ===
| Session | Group / round | Winner | Loser | Score |
Day 1 (16 December)
Afternoon
| Afternoon | Men's singles | (Canada) Denis Shapovalov [3] | (United States) Taylor Fritz [4] | 6–3, 6–0 |
| Evening | Men's singles | (United Kingdom) Andy Murray [6] | (United Kingdom) Dan Evans [5] | 6–3, 6–2 |
| Evening | Women's singles Final | (Tunisia) Ons Jabeur [1] | (Switzerland) Belinda Bencic [2] | 4–6, 6–3, [10–8] |
Day 2 (17 December)
Afternoon
| Afternoon | 5th place Play-off | (United States) Taylor Fritz [4] | (United Kingdom) Dan Evans [5] | 7–6^{(7–5)}, 4–6, [11–9] |
| Afternoon | Semifinals | (Russia) Andrey Rublev [1] | (Canada) Denis Shapovalov [3] | 7–6^{(7–5)}, 3–6, 6–4 |
Evening
| Evening | Semifinals | (United Kingdom) Andy Murray [6] | (Spain) Rafael Nadal [2] | 6–3, 7–5 |
Day 3 (18 December)
Afternoon
| Afternoon | 3rd place Play-off | (Canada) Denis Shapovalov [3] | (Spain) Rafael Nadal [2] | 6–7^{(4–7)}, 6–3, [10–6] |
| Evening | Men's singles Final | (Russia) Andrey Rublev [1] | (United Kingdom) Andy Murray [6] | 6–4, 7–6^{(7–2)} |

== Players ==
=== Men's singles ===
(Austria) Dominic Thiem (withdrew)
(Norway) Casper Ruud (withdrew)

| Country | Player | Ranking | Seeding |
|---|---|---|---|
| RUS | Andrey Rublev | 5 | 1 |
| ESP | Rafael Nadal | 6 | 2 |
| CAN | Denis Shapovalov | 14 | 3 |
| USA | Taylor Fritz | 23 | 4 |
| GBR | Dan Evans | 25 | 5 |
| GBR | Andy Murray | 134 | 6 |

=== Women's singles ===
(United Kingdom) Emma Raducanu (withdrew)

| Country | Player | Ranking | Seeding |
|---|---|---|---|
| TUN | Ons Jabeur | 10 | 1 |
| SUI | Belinda Bencic | 23 | 2 |
