= 2022 Mubadala World Tennis Championship =

Tennis competition

- Date: 16–18 December 2022
- Edition: 14th
- Surface: Hard
- Location: Abu Dhabi, United Arab Emirates
- Venue: International Tennis Centre

Champions

Men's singles
- (Greece) Stefanos Tsitsipas

Women's singles
- (Tunisia) Ons Jabeur
- Mubadala World Tennis Championship

The 2022 Mubadala World Tennis Championship was a non-ATP/WTA-affiliated exhibition tennis tournament. It was the 14th edition of the Mubadala World Tennis Championship with some of the world's top-ranked players competing in the event, held in a knockout format. The winner received $250,000 in prize money. The event was held at the International Tennis Centre at the Zayed Sports City in Abu Dhabi, United Arab Emirates. It served as a warm-up event for the season, with the 2023 ATP Tour beginning on December 29, 2022.

Carlos Alcaraz (world number 1) and Casper Ruud (number 3) received byes to the semifinal. Stefanos Tsitsipas defeated Andrey Rublev, 6–2, 4–6, 6–2, to win the men's tournament. Ons Jabeur defeated Emma Raducanu, 5–7, 6–3, [10–8], to win the women's tournament.

== Champions ==
=== Men's singles ===
- (Greece) Stefanos Tsitsipas def. Andrey Rublev, 6–2, 4–6, 6–2

=== Women's singles ===
- (Tunisia) Ons Jabeur def. (United Kingdom) Emma Raducanu, 5–7, 6–3, [10–8]

=== Day-by-day summaries ===
Session	Group / round	Winner	Loser	Score
Day 1 (16 December)
Afternoon	Men's singles	(Greece) Stefanos Tsitsipas [3]	(United Kingdom) Cameron Norrie [5]	6–1, 6–4
Evening	Men's singles	Andrey Rublev [4]	(Croatia) Borna Ćorić [6]	7–6^{(7–4)}, 6–4
Night	Women's singles final	(Tunisia) Ons Jabeur [1]	(United Kingdom) Emma Raducanu [2]	5–7, 6–3, [10–8]
Day 2 (17 December)
Afternoon	5th place play-off	(United Kingdom) Cameron Norrie [5]	(Croatia) Borna Ćorić [6]	6–3, 7–5
Evening	Semifinals	(Greece) Stefanos Tsitsipas [3]	(Norway) Casper Ruud [2]	6–2, 6–2
Night	Semifinals	Andrey Rublev [4]	(Spain) Carlos Alcaraz [1]	6–2, 6–1
Day 3 (18 December)
Noon	3rd place play-off	(Norway) Casper Ruud [2]	(Spain) Carlos Alcaraz [1]	6–1, 6–4
Afternoon	Men's singles final	(Greece) Stefanos Tsitsipas [3]	Andrey Rublev [4]	6–2, 4–6, 6–2

== Players ==
=== Men's singles ===
(United States) Frances Tiafoe (withdrew)

Country	Player	Ranking	Seed
ESP	Carlos Alcaraz	1	1
NOR	Casper Ruud	3	2
GRE	Stefanos Tsitsipas	4	3
RUS	Andrey Rublev	8	4
GBR	Cameron Norrie	14	5
CRO	Borna Ćorić	26	6

=== Women's singles ===
Country	Player	Ranking	Seed
TUN	Ons Jabeur	2	1
GBR	Emma Raducanu	75	2
