= 2021 Mubadala World Tennis Championship – Men's singles =

Men's singles
- 2021 Mubadala World Tennis Championship

Final
- Champion: (Russia) Andrey Rublev
- Runner-up: (United Kingdom) Andy Murray
- Score: 6–4, 7–6^{(7–2)}

Events
Singles	men	women
Doubles	men	women
← 2019 ·	Mubadala World Tennis Championship	· 2022 →

Rafael Nadal was the defending champion but lost in the semifinals to Andy Murray.

Andrey Rublev won the title, defeating Murray in the final.

== Seeds ==
1. (Russia) Andrey Rublev (champion)
2. (Spain) Rafael Nadal (semifinals) (fourth place)
3. (Canada) Denis Shapovalov (semifinals) (third place)
4. (United States) Taylor Fritz (quarterfinals) (fifth place)
5. (United Kingdom) Dan Evans (quarterfinals) (sixth place)
6. (United Kingdom) Andy Murray (final) (runner-up)

== Draw ==
Key

- Q = Qualifier
- WC = Wild card
- LL = Lucky loser
- Alt = Alternate
- ITF = ITF entry
- PR = Protected ranking
- SR = Special ranking
- SE = Special exempt
- JE = Junior exempt
- JR = Junior Accelerator Programme entrant
- CO = College Accelerator Programme entrant
- NG = Next Gen Accelerator Program entrant
- w/o = Walkover
- r = Retired
- d = Defaulted

=== Draw ===
Quarterfinals
3	(Canada) Denis Shapovalov	6	6
4	(United States) Taylor Fritz	3	0
5	(United Kingdom) Dan Evans	3	2
6	(United Kingdom) Andy Murray	6	6

Semifinals
1	(Russia) Andrey Rublev	7^{7}	3	6
3	(Canada) Denis Shapovalov	6^{5}	6	4
6	(United Kingdom) Andy Murray	6	7
2	(Spain) Rafael Nadal	3	5

Final
1	(Russia) Andrey Rublev	6	7^{7}
6	(United Kingdom) Andy Murray	4	6^{2}
Third Place Match
3	(Canada) Denis Shapovalov	6^{4}	6	[10]
2	(Spain) Rafael Nadal	7^{7}	3	[6]

=== Play-offs ===
Fifth Place Match
4	(United States) Taylor Fritz	7^{7}	4	[11]
5	(United Kingdom) Dan Evans	6^{5}	6	[9]
