= 2011 Mubadala World Tennis Championship (December) =

- Date: 29–31 December 2011
- Edition: 4th
- Surface: Hard
- Location: Abu Dhabi, United Arab Emirates
- Venue: Abu Dhabi International Tennis Complex

Champions

Singles
- (Serbia) Novak Djokovic
← 2011 ·	Mubadala World Tennis Championship	· 2012 →

The 2011 Mubadala World Tennis Championship in December is a non-ATP affiliated exhibition tournament. The world's top players competed in the event, which is held in a knockout format. The prize money for the winner was $250,000. The event was held at the Abu Dhabi International Tennis Complex at the Zayed Sports City in Abu Dhabi, United Arab Emirates. It was a warm-up event for the 2012 tennis season, with the ATP World Tour beginning on January 2, 2012.

== Players ==
Country	Player	Ranking*	Seeding
SRB	Novak Djokovic	1	1
ESP	Rafael Nadal	2	2
SUI	Roger Federer	3	3
ESP	David Ferrer	5	4
FRA	Jo-Wilfried Tsonga	6	5
FRA	Gaël Monfils	15	6

*Seedings based on the November 28, 2011 rankings.

== Results ==
Last year's finalists receive a bye into the semifinals.

Quarterfinals
1	(Serbia) Novak Djokovic	6	4	6
6	(France) Gaël Monfils	2	6	2
4	(Spain) David Ferrer	2	7^{7}	6
5	(France) Jo-Wilfried Tsonga	6	6^{5}	2

Semifinals
1	(Serbia) Novak Djokovic	6	6
3	(Switzerland) Roger Federer	2	1
4	(Spain) David Ferrer	6	6
2	(Spain) Rafael Nadal	3	2

Final
1	(Serbia) Novak Djokovic	6	6
4	(Spain) David Ferrer	2	1
Third Place Match
3	(Switzerland) Roger Federer	1	5
2	(Spain) Rafael Nadal	6	7

- Novak Djokovic wins his first title in Abu Dhabi.
