= 2019 Mubadala World Tennis Championship =

- Date: 19–21 December 2019
- Edition: 12th
- Surface: Hard
- Location: Abu Dhabi, United Arab Emirates
- Venue: International Tennis Centre

Champions

Men's singles
- (Spain) Rafael Nadal

Women's singles
- (Russia) Maria Sharapova
- Mubadala World Tennis Championship

The 2019 Mubadala World Tennis Championship was a non-ATP/WTA-affiliated exhibition tennis tournament. It was the 12th edition of the Mubadala World Tennis Championship with the world's top players competing in the event, held in a knockout format. The winner received $250,000 prize money. The event was held at the International Tennis Centre at the Zayed Sports City in Abu Dhabi, United Arab Emirates. It served as a warm-up event for the season, with the ATP World Tour beginning on January 3, 2020.

Rafael Nadal (world number 1) and Novak Djokovic (number 2) received byes to the semi-final.

== Champions ==
=== Men's singles ===
- (Spain) Rafael Nadal def. (Greece) Stefanos Tsitsipas 6–7^{(3–7)}, 7–5, 7–6^{(7–3)}

=== Women's singles ===
- (Russia) Maria Sharapova def. (Australia) Ajla Tomljanović 6–4, 7–5

== Players ==
=== Men's singles ===
Country	Player	Ranking	Seeding
ESP	Rafael Nadal	1	1
SRB	Novak Djokovic	2	2
GRE	Stefanos Tsitsipas	6	3
RUS	Karen Khachanov	17	4
RUS	Andrey Rublev	23	5
KOR	Hyeon Chung	128	6

==== Withdrawals ====
Before the tournament

- (Russia) Daniil Medvedev → replaced by (Russia) Karen Khachanov
- (France) Gaël Monfils → replaced by (Russia) Andrey Rublev

=== Women's singles ===
Country	Player	Ranking	Seeding
AUS	Ajla Tomljanović	51	1
RUS	Maria Sharapova	131	2
