= 2011 Mubadala World Tennis Championship (January) =

- Date: 30 Dec 2010 – 1 Jan 2011
- Edition: 3rd
- Surface: Hard
- Location: Abu Dhabi, United Arab Emirates
- Venue: Abu Dhabi International Tennis Complex

Champions

Singles
- (Spain) Rafael Nadal
← 2010 ·	Mubadala World Tennis Championship	· 2011 →

The 2011 Mubadala World Tennis Championship was a non-ATP affiliated exhibition tournament. The world's top players competed in the knock-out event, which has prize money of $250,000 to the winner. The event was held at the Abu Dhabi International Tennis Complex at the Zayed Sports City in Abu Dhabi, United Arab Emirates. It was a warm-up event for the season, with the ATP World Tour beginning on January 4, 2011.

== Players ==
1. (Spain) Rafael Nadal ATP No. 1
2. (Switzerland) Roger Federer ATP No. 2
3. (Sweden) Robin Söderling ATP No. 5
4. (Czech Republic) Tomáš Berdych ATP No. 6
5. (France) Jo-Wilfried Tsonga ATP No. 13
6. (Cyprus) Marcos Baghdatis ATP No. 20

== Results ==
Quarterfinals
4	(Czech Republic) Tomáš Berdych	6	3	7
6	(Cyprus) Marcos Baghdatis	3	6	5
5	(France) Jo-Wilfried Tsonga	4	7^{7}	1
3	(Sweden) Robin Söderling	6	6^{5}	6

Semifinals
1	(Spain) Rafael Nadal	6	6
4	(Czech Republic) Tomáš Berdych	4	4
3	(Sweden) Robin Söderling	7^{7}	3	3
2	(Switzerland) Roger Federer	6^{3}	6	6

Final
1	(Spain) Rafael Nadal	7^{7}	7^{7}
2	(Switzerland) Roger Federer	6^{4}	6^{3}
Third Place Match
4	(Czech Republic) Tomáš Berdych	4	6^{3}
3	(Sweden) Robin Söderling	6	7^{7}

- It was Nadal's 2nd win at the event, also winning in 2010. It made him the most successful player at the event, with two titles.
