= 2022 Mubadala World Tennis Championship – Men's singles =

Men's singles
- 2022 Mubadala World Tennis Championship

Final
- Champion: (Greece) Stefanos Tsitsipas
- Runner-up: Andrey Rublev
- Score: 6–2, 4–6, 6–2

Events
Singles	men	women
Doubles	men	women
← 2021 ·	Mubadala World Tennis Championship

Stefanos Tsitsipas won the title, defeating the defending champion Andrey Rublev in the final.

== Seeds ==
1. (Spain) Carlos Alcaraz (semifinals) (fourth place)
2. (Norway) Casper Ruud (semifinals) (third place)
3. (Greece) Stefanos Tsitsipas (champion)
4. Andrey Rublev (final) (runner-up)
5. (United Kingdom) Cameron Norrie (quarterfinals) (fifth place)
6. (Croatia) Borna Ćorić (quarterfinals) (sixth place)

== Draw ==
Key

- Q = Qualifier
- WC = Wild card
- LL = Lucky loser
- Alt = Alternate
- ITF = ITF entry
- PR = Protected ranking
- SR = Special ranking
- SE = Special exempt
- JE = Junior exempt
- JR = Junior Accelerator Programme entrant
- CO = College Accelerator Programme entrant
- NG = Next Gen Accelerator Program entrant
- w/o = Walkover
- r = Retired
- d = Defaulted

=== Draw ===
Quarterfinals
6	(Croatia) Borna Ćorić	6^{4}	4
4	Andrey Rublev	7^{7}	6
3	(Greece) Stefanos Tsitsipas	6	6
5	(United Kingdom) Cameron Norrie	1	4

Semifinals
1	(Spain) Carlos Alcaraz	2	1
4	Andrey Rublev	6	6
3	(Greece) Stefanos Tsitsipas	6	6
2	(Norway) Casper Ruud	2	2

Final
4	Andrey Rublev	2	6	2
3	(Greece) Stefanos Tsitsipas	6	4	6
Third Place Match
1	(Spain) Carlos Alcaraz	1	4
2	(Norway) Casper Ruud	6	6

=== Play-offs ===
Fifth Place Match
5	(United Kingdom) Cameron Norrie	6	7
6	(Croatia) Borna Ćorić	3	5
