= 2017 Mubadala World Tennis Championship – Men's singles =

Men's singles
- 2017 Mubadala World Tennis Championship

Final
- Champion: (South Africa) Kevin Anderson
- Runner-up: (Spain) Roberto Bautista Agut
- Score: 6–4, 7–6^{(7–0)}
← 2016 ·	Mubadala World Tennis Championship	· 2018 →

Rafael Nadal was the competition's defending champion but withdrew before the start of the competition and was replaced by Roberto Bautista Agut.

== Seeds ==
1. (Austria) Dominic Thiem (semifinals) (Third place)
2. (Spain) Pablo Carreño Busta (quarterfinals) (Sixth place)
3. (Serbia) Novak Djokovic (withdrew due to an elbow pain)
4. (South Africa) Kevin Anderson (champion)
5. (Spain) Roberto Bautista Agut (final) (Runner-up)
6. (Russia) Andrey Rublev (quarterfinals) (Fifth place)

== Draw ==
=== Key ===
- Q = Qualifier
- WC = Wild card
- LL = Lucky loser
- Alt = Alternate
- ITF = ITF entry
- PR = Protected ranking
- SR = Special ranking
- SE = Special exempt
- JE = Junior exempt
- JR = Junior Accelerator Programme entrant
- CO = College Accelerator Programme entrant
- NG = Next Gen Accelerator Program entrant
- w/o = Walkover
- r = Retired
- d = Defaulted

=== Draw ===
Quarterfinals
1	(Austria) Dominic Thiem
bye
2	(Spain) Pablo Carreño Busta	3	6^{2}
4	(South Africa) Kevin Anderson	6	7^{7}
5	(Spain) Roberto Bautista Agut	7	6
6	(Russia) Andrey Rublev	5	2
bye
3	(Serbia) Novak Djokovic

Semifinals
1	(Austria) Dominic Thiem	6^{6}	4
4	(South Africa) Kevin Anderson	7^{8}	6
5	(Spain) Roberto Bautista Agut	w/o
3	(Serbia) Novak Djokovic

Final
4	' (South Africa) Kevin Anderson	6	7^{7}
5	(Spain) Roberto Bautista Agut	4	6^{0}
Third Place Match
1	(Austria) Dominic Thiem	w/o
3	(Serbia) Novak Djokovic

=== Play-offs ===
Fifth Place Match
2	(Spain) Pablo Carreño Busta	4	2
6	(Russia) Andrey Rublev	6	6

== Additional exhibition matches ==
Exhibition Match #1 (1 set)
1	(Spain) Roberto Bautista Agut	6
2	(United Kingdom) Andy Murray	2

Exhibition Match #2
1	(Austria) Dominic Thiem	6	6
2	(Spain) Pablo Carreño Busta	3	4
