= 2018 Mubadala World Tennis Championship =

- Date: 27–29 December 2018
- Edition: 11th
- Surface: Hard
- Location: Abu Dhabi, United Arab Emirates
- Venue: International Tennis Centre

Champions

Men's singles
- (Serbia) Novak Djokovic

Women's singles
- (United States) Venus Williams
- Mubadala World Tennis Championship

The 2018 Mubadala World Tennis Championship was a non-ATP/WTA-affiliated exhibition tennis tournament. It was the 11th edition of the Mubadala World Tennis Championship with the world's top players competing in the event, held in a knockout format. The prize money for the winner was $250,000. The event was held at the International Tennis Centre at the Zayed Sports City in Abu Dhabi, United Arab Emirates.

Novak Djokovic (world number 1) and Rafael Nadal (number 2) received byes to the semi-final.

== Champions ==
=== Men's singles ===
- (Serbia) Novak Djokovic def. (South Africa) Kevin Anderson 4–6, 7–5, 7–5

=== Women's singles ===
- (United States) Venus Williams def. (United States) Serena Williams 4–6, 6–3, [10–8]

== Players ==
=== Men's singles ===
Country	Player	Ranking	Seeding
SRB	Novak Djokovic	1	1
ESP	Rafael Nadal	2	2
RSA	Kevin Anderson	6	3
AUT	Dominic Thiem	8	4
RUS	Karen Khachanov	11	5
KOR	Hyeon Chung	25	6

During the tournament

- (Spain) Rafael Nadal → replaced by (Austria) Dominic Thiem (for a third place match against (Russia) Karen Khachanov)

=== Women's singles ===
Country	Player	Ranking	Seeding
USA	Serena Williams	16	1
USA	Venus Williams	38	2
