= 2016 Mubadala World Tennis Championship (December) – Singles =

Singles
- 2016 Mubadala World Tennis Championship

Final
- Champion: (Spain) Rafael Nadal
- Runner-up: (Belgium) David Goffin
- Score: 6–4, 7–6^{(7–5)}
- Mubadala World Tennis Championship

Rafael Nadal was the competition's defending champion and successfully defended his title, defeating David Goffin in the final, 6–4, 7–6^{(7–5)}.

== Seeds ==
1. (United Kingdom) Andy Murray (third place)
2. (Canada) Milos Raonic (fourth place)

== Draw ==
Key

- Q = Qualifier
- WC = Wild card
- LL = Lucky loser
- Alt = Alternate
- ITF = ITF entry
- PR = Protected ranking
- SR = Special ranking
- SE = Special exempt
- JE = Junior exempt
- JR = Junior Accelerator Programme entrant
- CO = College Accelerator Programme entrant
- NG = Next Gen Accelerator Program entrant
- w/o = Walkover
- r = Retired
- d = Defaulted

=== Draw ===
Quarterfinals
1	(United Kingdom) Andy Murray
bye
(Belgium) David Goffin	7^{7}	6
(France) Jo-Wilfried Tsonga	6^{2}	4
(Spain) Rafael Nadal	6	6
(Czech Republic) Tomáš Berdych	0	4
bye
2	(Canada) Milos Raonic

Semifinals
1	(United Kingdom) Andy Murray	6^{4}	4
(Belgium) David Goffin	7^{7}	6
(Spain) Rafael Nadal	6	3	6
2	(Canada) Milos Raonic	1	6	3

Final
(Belgium) David Goffin	4	6^{5}
(Spain) Rafael Nadal	6	7^{7}
Third Place Match
1	(United Kingdom) Andy Murray	6	7^{8}
2	(Canada) Milos Raonic	3	6^{6}

=== Play-offs ===
Fifth Place Match
(France) Jo-Wilfried Tsonga	6^{5}	6	[10]
(Czech Republic) Tomáš Berdych	7^{7}	3	[3]
