= 2009 Capitala World Tennis Championship =

- Date: 1–3 January 2009
- Edition: 1st
- Surface: Hard
- Location: Abu Dhabi, United Arab Emirates
- Venue: Abu Dhabi International Tennis Complex

Champions

Singles
- (United Kingdom) Andy Murray
- Capitala World Tennis Championship

The 2009 Capitala World Tennis Championship was a non-ATP affiliated exhibition tournament. It was the first edition of the event held in Abu Dhabi, from January 1 through January 3, 2009 and. Six of the world's top ten were competing in the knockout event, which had prize money of $250,000 to the winner. The event was held at the Abu Dhabi International Tennis Complex at the Zayed Sports City in Abu Dhabi. It served as a warm-up event for the season, with the ATP World Tour beginning on January 5, 2009.

Rafael Nadal (world number 1) and Roger Federer (number 2) received byes to the semi-final.

== Review ==
=== Day one ===
Andy Roddick and Nikolay Davydenko started the tournament on January 1. Davydenko won the match in straight sets 6–4, 6–4. Roddick won his first service game with three straight aces but was broken in his next service game and Davydenko held his serves to take the set. At 4–4 in the second he was again broken and Davydenko then held his serve to win the match and set up a match with Nadal.

Later in the day Andy Murray beat James Blake 6–2, 6–2 in a match lasting less than one hour. Murray broke Blake twice in each set to win the match. He broke Blake for the first time in the third game and then established a 5–2 lead with another break. He then took a 4–0 lead in the second set. Murray went through to face former world no. 1 Roger Federer in the semi-finals.

=== Day two ===
Day Two began with the first semi-final between Federer and Murray. Federer broke Murray early on to open up a 3–0 lead but Murray broke back to level the match at 3-3. With a tiebreak looming Federer broke for the set. Murray took the second 6–2 to level the match. In the final set, Murray continued his winning run of games, taking a 4–1 lead but, after missing an opportunity for 5–1, Federer won the next three games. The set went to a tiebreak which Murray edged 8–6 to reach the final and to beat Federer for the fifth time.

In the second semi-final Davydenko faced Nadal. The Russian broke Nadal to love in the first game of the match but he won just one more game in the set as he lost it 6–2. The second set began just as the first, with a break for Davydenko but Nadal immediately broke back. In the sixth game, with Davydenko serving at 3-2 down, Nadal gained another break and which the Russian could not recover, with the Spaniard taking the set 6-3 for a 6–2, 6–3 victory. Nadal went through to the final to play Murray.

=== Day three ===
The final saw Nadal take on Murray. The first two games went with serve. But Murray broke Nadal in his next service game, after a third break point. Nadal, however, broke back in the eighth game. Murray then won the next two games to take the set 6–4. The second set started with four straight service holds before Murray got a break to lead 3–2. With victory in sight for Murray, Nadal broke straight back. He then got another break in the 12th game and closed out the set 7–5. In the seventh game of the final set Murray gained the decisive break in a game lasting 14 minutes. Murray held on to win the debut edition and to beat Federer and Nadal at the same tournament for the first time.

== Players ==
Country	Player	Ranking	Seeding
ESP	Rafael Nadal	1	1
SUI	Roger Federer	2	2
GBR	Andy Murray	4	3
RUS	Nikolay Davydenko	5	4
USA	Andy Roddick	8	5
USA	James Blake	10	6

== Results ==
Quarterfinals
5	(United States) Andy Roddick	4	4
4	(Russia) Nikolay Davydenko	6	6
3	(United Kingdom) Andy Murray	6	6
6	(United States) James Blake	2	2

Semifinals
1	(Spain) Rafael Nadal	6	6
4	(Russia) Nikolay Davydenko	2	3
3	(United Kingdom) Andy Murray	4	6	7^{8}
2	(Switzerland) Roger Federer	6	2	6^{6}

Final
1	(Spain) Rafael Nadal	4	7	3
3	(United Kingdom) Andy Murray	6	5	6

- It was Murray's 1st win at the event, making him the first winner of the tournament's history.
