= 2018 Mubadala World Tennis Championship – Men's singles =

Men's singles
- 2018 Mubadala World Tennis Championship

Final
- Champion: (Serbia) Novak Djokovic
- Runner-up: (South Africa) Kevin Anderson
- Score: 4–6, 7–5, 7–5
← 2017 ·	Mubadala World Tennis Championship	· 2019 →

Kevin Anderson was the competition's defending champion, but lost in the final from Novak Djokovic.

== Seeds ==
1. (Serbia) Novak Djokovic (champion)
2. (Spain) Rafael Nadal (semifinals) (withdrew from playing 3rd place play-off)
3. (South Africa) Kevin Anderson (final) (runner-up)
4. (Austria) Dominic Thiem (quarterfinals) (fourth place)
5. (Russia) Karen Khachanov (semifinals) (third place)
6. (South Korea) Hyeon Chung (quarterfinals) (fifth place)

== Draw ==
=== Key ===
- Q = Qualifier
- WC = Wild card
- LL = Lucky loser
- Alt = Alternate
- ITF = ITF entry
- PR = Protected ranking
- SR = Special ranking
- SE = Special exempt
- JE = Junior exempt
- JR = Junior Accelerator Programme entrant
- CO = College Accelerator Programme entrant
- NG = Next Gen Accelerator Program entrant
- w/o = Walkover
- r = Retired
- d = Defaulted

=== Draw ===
Quarterfinals
4	(Austria) Dominic Thiem	6^{3}	3
5	(Russia) Karen Khachanov	7^{7}	6
3	(South Africa) Kevin Anderson	6^{4}	6	6
6	(South Korea) Hyeon Chung	7^{7}	2	1

Semifinals
1	(Serbia) Novak Djokovic	6	6
5	(Russia) Karen Khachanov	4	2
3	(South Africa) Kevin Anderson	4	6	6
2	(Spain) Rafael Nadal	6	3	4

Final
1	(Serbia) Novak Djokovic	4	7	7
3	(South Africa) Kevin Anderson	6	5	5
Third Place Match
5	(Russia) Karen Khachanov	6	4	[10]
4	(Austria) Dominic Thiem	3	6	[3]

=== Play-offs ===
Fifth Place Match
6	(South Korea) Hyeon Chung	6	6
4	(Austria) Dominic Thiem	2	3
