= 2012 Mubadala World Tennis Championship =

- Date: 27–29 December 2012
- Edition: 5th
- Surface: Hard
- Location: Abu Dhabi, United Arab Emirates
- Venue: Abu Dhabi International Tennis Complex

Champions

Singles
- (Serbia) Novak Djokovic
- Mubadala World Tennis Championship

The 2012 Mubadala World Tennis Championship is a non-ATP affiliated exhibition tournament. The world's top players competed in the event, which was held in a knockout format. The prize money for the winner was $250,000. The event was held at the Abu Dhabi International Tennis Complex at the Zayed Sports City in Abu Dhabi, United Arab Emirates. It was a warm-up event for the 2013 tennis season, with the ATP World Tour beginning on December 31, 2012.

== Seeds ==
1. (Serbia) Novak Djokovic (champion)
2. (Spain) Rafael Nadal (withdrew)
3. (United Kingdom) Andy Murray (quarterfinals)
4. (Spain) David Ferrer (semifinals, Third)
5. (Czech Republic) Tomáš Berdych (quarterfinals)
6. (Serbia) Janko Tipsarević (semifinals, Fourth)

== Draw ==
Key

- Q = Qualifier
- WC = Wild card
- LL = Lucky loser
- Alt = Alternate
- ITF = ITF entry
- PR = Protected ranking
- SR = Special ranking
- SE = Special exempt
- JE = Junior exempt
- JR = Junior Accelerator Programme entrant
- CO = College Accelerator Programme entrant
- NG = Next Gen Accelerator Program entrant
- w/o = Walkover
- r = Retired
- d = Defaulted

=== Draw ===
Quarterfinals
1	(Serbia) Novak Djokovic
bye
4	(Spain) David Ferrer	6	6
5	(Czech Republic) Tomáš Berdych	2	4
6	(Serbia) Janko Tipsarević	6	6
3	(United Kingdom) Andy Murray	3	4
bye
Alt	(Spain) Nicolás Almagro

Semifinals
1	(Serbia) Novak Djokovic	6	6
4	(Spain) David Ferrer	0	3
Alt	(Spain) Nicolás Almagro	2	7^{7}	6
6	(Serbia) Janko Tipsarević	6	6^{3}	2

Final
1	(Serbia) Novak Djokovic	6^{4}	6	6
Alt	(Spain) Nicolás Almagro	7^{7}	3	4
Third Place Match
4	(Spain) David Ferrer	7^{7}	6
6	(Serbia) Janko Tipsarević	6^{4}	2
