= 2015 Mubadala World Tennis Championship – Singles =

Tennis tournament in Abu Dhabi, UAE

Singles
- 2015 Mubadala World Tennis Championship

Final
- Champion: (United Kingdom) Andy Murray
- Runner-up: (Serbia) Novak Djokovic
- Score: walkover
- Mubadala World Tennis Championship

Novak Djokovic was the three-time defending champion and lost the final to Andy Murray by way of walkover.

== Seeds ==
1. (Serbia) Novak Djokovic (final, withdrew due to illness)
2. (Spain) Rafael Nadal (semifinals) (third place)
3. (Switzerland) Stan Wawrinka (semifinals) (fourth place)
4. (United Kingdom) Andy Murray (champion)
5. (Spain) Feliciano López (quarterfinals) (sixth place)
6. (Spain) Nicolás Almagro (quarterfinals) (fifth place)

== Draw ==
Key

- Q = Qualifier
- WC = Wild card
- LL = Lucky loser
- Alt = Alternate
- ITF = ITF entry
- PR = Protected ranking
- SR = Special ranking
- SE = Special exempt
- JE = Junior exempt
- JR = Junior Accelerator Programme entrant
- CO = College Accelerator Programme entrant
- NG = Next Gen Accelerator Program entrant
- w/o = Walkover
- r = Retired
- d = Defaulted

=== Draw ===
Quarterfinals
1	(Serbia) Novak Djokovic
bye
3	(Switzerland) Stan Wawrinka	6	6
6	(Spain) Nicolás Almagro	3	2
4	(United Kingdom) Andy Murray	7^{7}	5	6
5	(Spain) Feliciano López	6^{1}	7	4
bye
2	(Spain) Rafael Nadal

Semifinals
1	(Serbia) Novak Djokovic	6	6
3	(Switzerland) Stan Wawrinka	1	2
4	(United Kingdom) Andy Murray	6	6
2	(Spain) Rafael Nadal	2	0

Final
1	(Serbia) Novak Djokovic
4	(United Kingdom) Andy Murray	w/o
Third-place match
3	(Switzerland) Stan Wawrinka	6^{1}	3
2	(Spain) Rafael Nadal	7^{7}	6

=== Play-offs ===
Fifth Place Match
5	(Spain) Feliciano López	4	6^{6}
6	(Spain) Nicolás Almagro	6	7^{8}
