= Robin Söderling =

Swedish tennis player

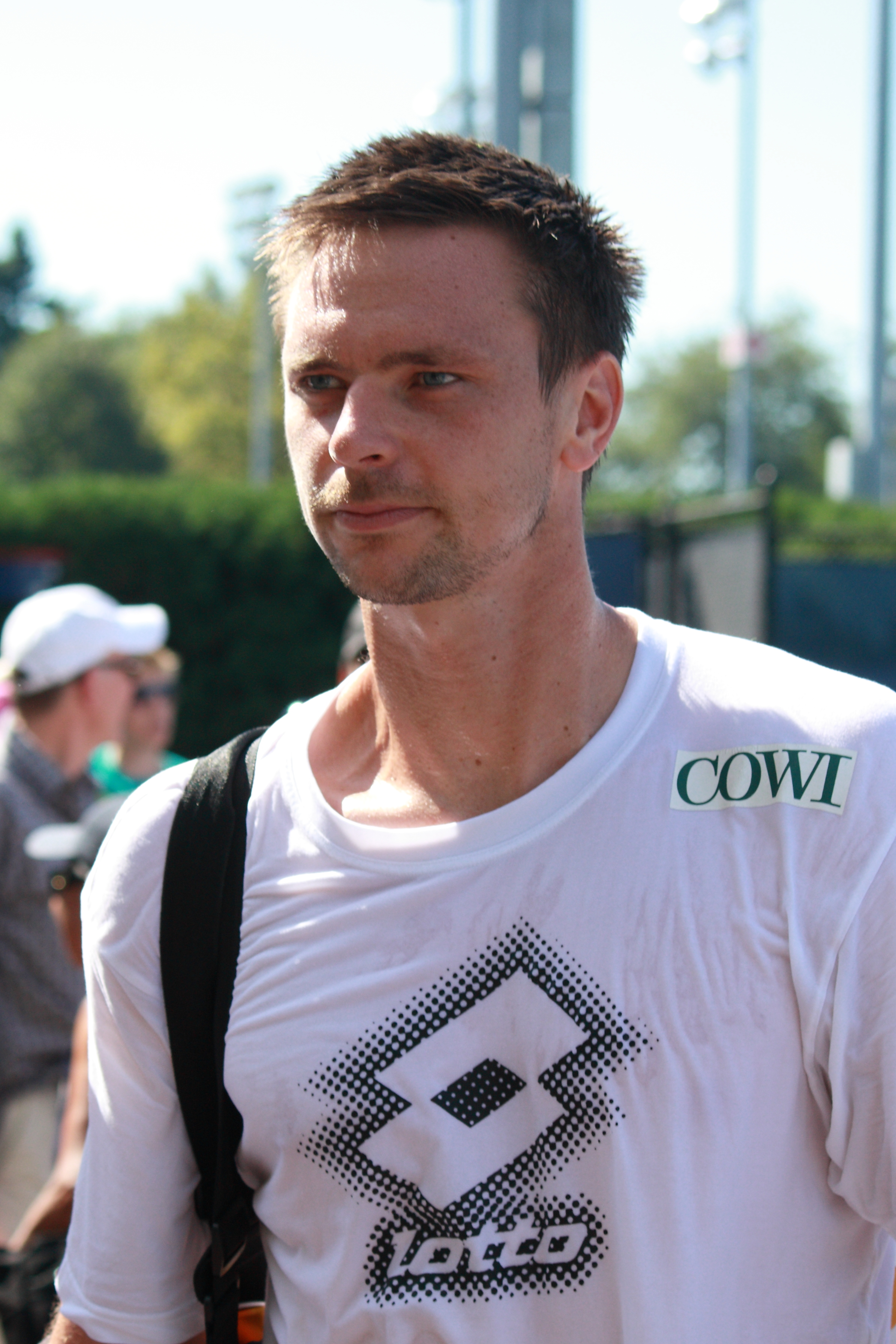
- Robin Söderling at the 2010 US Open
- Full name: Robin Bo Carl Söderling
- Country (sports): Sweden
- Residence: Monte Carlo, Monaco
- Born: 14 August 1984 (age 42) Tibro, Sweden
- Height: 1.93 m (6 ft 4 in)
- Turned pro: 2001
- Retired: 2015 (last match July 2011)
- Plays: Right-handed (two-handed backhand)
- Prize money: US$10,423,124

Singles
- Career record: 310–170 (64.6%)
- Career titles: 10
- Highest ranking: No. 4 (15 November 2010)

Grand Slam singles results
- Australian Open: 4R (2011)
- French Open: F (2009, 2010)
- Wimbledon: QF (2010)
- US Open: QF (2009, 2010)

Other tournaments
- Tour Finals: SF (2009)
- Olympic Games: 1R (2004, 2008)

Doubles
- Career record: 33–43 (43.4%)
- Career titles: 1
- Highest ranking: No. 109 (9 May 2009)

Grand Slam doubles results
- Wimbledon: 2R (2005)
- US Open: 2R (2004, 2005)

Team competitions
- Davis Cup: SF (2007)

Robin Bo Carl Söderling (Swedish pronunciation: [ˈrɔ̌bːɪn ˈsø̌ːdɛɭɪŋ]; born 14 August 1984) is a Swedish former professional tennis player. He was ranked world No. 4 in men's singles by the Association of Tennis Professionals (ATP) in November 2010. Söderling won ten singles titles on the ATP Tour, with career highlights including two consecutive finals at the French Open in 2009 and 2010, and a Masters title at the 2010 Paris Masters. He was the first player to defeat Rafael Nadal at the French Open. Söderling played his last professional match at only age 26 after contracting a lingering bout of Mononucleosis.

== Tennis career ==
Söderling began playing tennis at the age of five. He made his first steps in international tennis in November 1998 in Luxembourg when at the age of 14 he played his first official junior tournament, losing the opening match to Fred Hemmes Jr.

Söderling came to prominence at the 2009 French Open, where he became the first player to defeat Rafael Nadal at the tournament, and the only one to achieve it until Novak Djokovic in 2015. Nadal had previously never lost at the tournament since his debut in 2005 and was the four-time defending champion. Söderling subsequently advanced to the final, defeating two-time semi-finalist Nikolay Davydenko in the quarterfinals and Fernando González in five sets in the semifinals en route before being defeated by Roger Federer in the final.

Söderling reached a second successive French Open final in 2010. He defeated defending champion Federer in the quarterfinals, which ended Federer's record streak of 23 consecutive Grand Slam semifinals. Söderling won the semifinal in five sets against Tomáš Berdych before losing in straight sets to Rafael Nadal in the final.

Following injuries and illness, Söderling had not played a tour-level match since he won the 2011 Swedish Open in July 2011, (at which time he was ranked No. 5 in the world, was only 26 years old and was ranked inside the Top 5 for more than 50 consecutive weeks) until his retirement in 2015. He has become active in tennis administration as a tournament director at the Stockholm Open in 2014 and 2015 and produced his own brand of premium tennis gear since 2013.

On 23 December 2015, Söderling announced his retirement from professional tennis.

=== Juniors ===
In his first full year in the junior tour (2000), he achieved four tournament victories and in 2001 attained three more titles in the juniors including the prestigious Orange Bowl, which he won without dropping a set. In the same year, Söderling achieved No. 4 in the year-end ranking.

As a junior Söderling reached as high as No. 2 in the world in singles in 2002 (and No. 11 in doubles).

=== 2001–2008: Early years ===
Söderling turned pro in 2001, but only played 2 tour-level matches. He played in his first ATP tournament in Stockholm, winning his first match 6–3, 6–3 against Ramón Delgado.

Söderling tried to make his name known in the men's circuit in 2002, playing five more ATP tournaments and the second round of the US Open. In the Challenger circuit, he achieved a 20–7 record, and he played in the US Open Junior tournament where he reached the final.

In 2003 the transition to the main tour was completed as he reached the third round at Wimbledon (coming from the qualifying rounds) and reached an ATP final in Stockholm (losing a decisive tie-break there), earning the year-end ranking of 86.

Robin's first ATP title came in 2004 at the Lyon where he beat Belgian Xavier Malisse in the final. He also made the final at Marseille. By the end of the year, Söderling climbed into the world's top 50 in the rankings.

Söderling suffered his first serious injury in 2005, eventually resulting in a knee operation in March. But even though not fit to play many tournaments, he managed to win another title – in Milan (defeating Radek Štěpánek in the final). After a mediocre and injury troubled season from there on, Söderling reached the third round in the US Open before going through another surgery.

Returning in 2006, he bounced back from 100th place in the Indesit ATP rankings to top 50 within three months, even though knee and shoulder injuries still prevented him from playing at his best. He helped the Swedish team with two wins to keep its World Group Davis Cup spot in a play-off in Brazil. During this he earned sufficient ATP points to finish at a then career-high ranking of No. 25 in the world.

In 2007 Söderling made it to the round of 32 at Wimbledon, where he lost to Rafael Nadal in a five-set match. He caused much controversy on the court when he exchanged mocking behaviour with Nadal, tugging on his shorts in the manner Nadal is known for after growing tired of Nadal's slow play at the beginning of the 5th. Söderling did not make it to an ATP final for the first time in five years in 2007, however, he turned out consistent results throughout the year. He missed the last 3 months of the main tour due to a left wrist injury. Söderling missed the Australian Open due to injury. The first tournament he entered in 2007 was the Open 13 Marseille, where he reached the quarterfinals. He then reached the final of the ABN AMRO World Tennis Tournament (Rotterdam), finishing runner-up to Michaël Llodra in the final, 7–6, 2–6, 6–3. The next week he reached another final at the Regions Morgan Keegan Championships in Memphis, U.S. He beat top seed Andy Roddick in the tournament along the way to the final. However, he lost another final in two weeks as he finished runner-up to unseeded Steve Darcis, 3–6, 6–7.

At the 2008 World Team Cup in Düsseldorf on clay, he was undefeated in four singles and four doubles matches. He became only the third player in the history of that event to accomplish that feat since John McEnroe in 1984 and Fernando González in 2003. Winning all of his matches there, he led the Swedish team to victory. In late May he reached the 3rd round in the French Open where he lost against home player Julien Benneteau. At Wimbledon, he lost to Roger Federer in the round of 64 in three straight sets. After disappointing results in both the Beijing Olympics and the US Open, Söderling decided to break up with his trainer Peter Carlsson. He took on former Swedish world number 2 Magnus Norman as support until he appointed a new trainer. With the help of Norman, Robin reached his third final of the year in his native Sweden at Stockholm, but lost to David Nalbandian in a tough match, 2–6, 7–5, 3–6. Three weeks later Söderling finally clinched a final win for his first title in 3 years, and the second on the particular venue, at the Lyon tournament, defeating Julien Benneteau in three sets, 6–3, 6–7, 6–1. On his way to the final he recorded wins over top seed Andy Roddick in the quarterfinals, as well as the French number one Gilles Simon in the semi, both ranked in the top 10 ATP South African Airways ranking. With that, Söderling himself climbed as high as No. 18 in the rankings, a new career-best. He finished the year with a then career-high ranking of No. 17. On 4 November he announced that Magnus Norman would be his trainer starting right after his vacation.

=== 2009: French Open final and top 10 debut ===
With his new trainer, Söderling started the 2009 ATP World Tour at the Brisbane International. He lost in the quarterfinals to Radek Štěpánek, At Heineken Open he lost in the semifinals to Juan Martín del Potro. He was seeded 16th at the 2009 Australian Open and lost to unseeded former finalist Marcos Baghdatis in the second round.

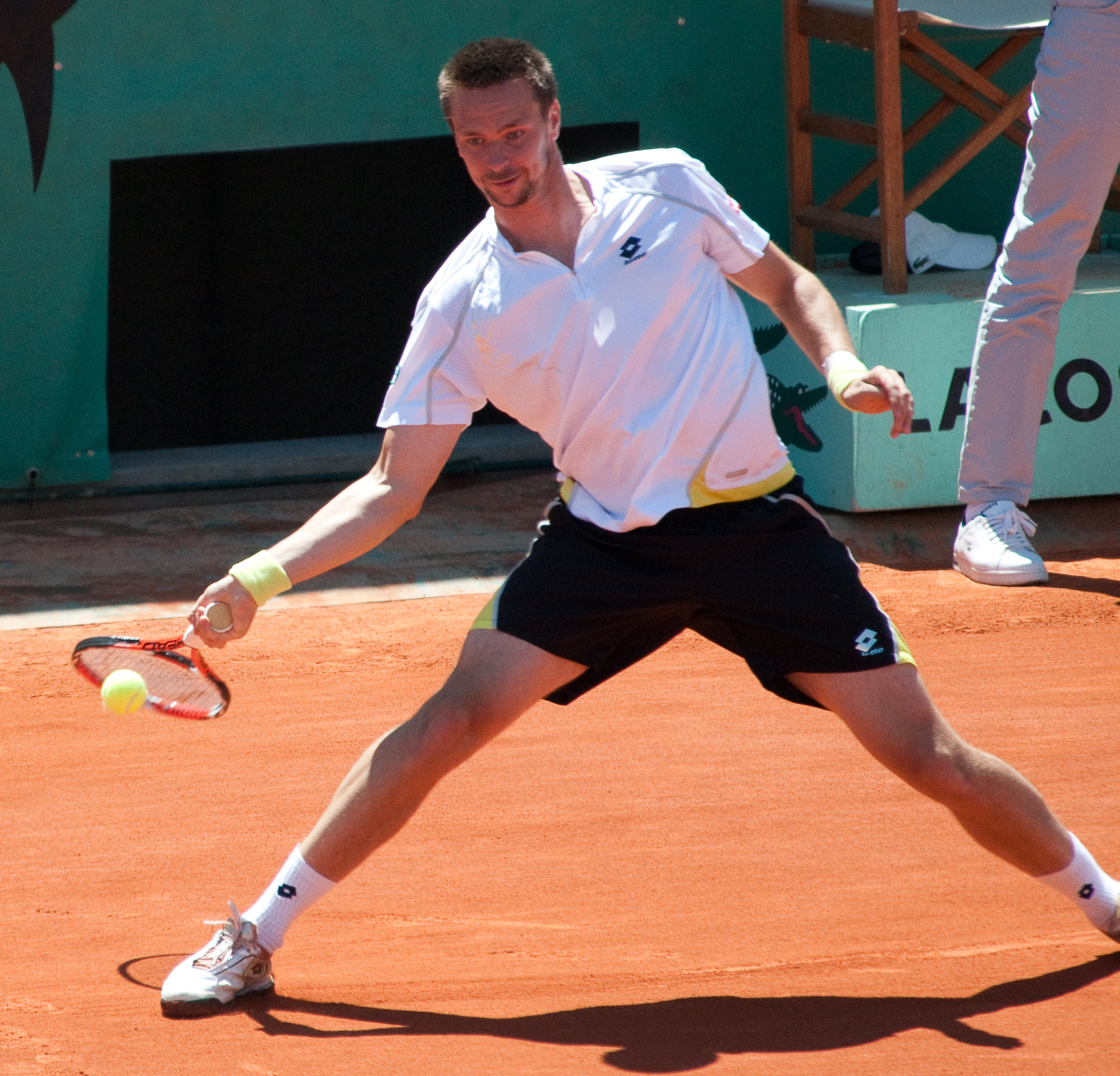
Söderling became the first Swede to reach the French Open final in 2009 since his coach Magnus Norman in 2000.

Despite winning the Challenger in Sunrise, Söderling suffered from injuries mixed with poor results for over two months. He finally won consecutive matches for the first time on the ATP tour since the Australian Open at the Rome Masters, before falling to world No. 1 Rafael Nadal in a controversial match in the third round, winning one game. Following another third round exit at the Madrid Masters against Roger Federer, Söderling next competed at the ARAG World Team Cup in Düsseldorf, as part of the Swedish contingent. Although Sweden lost, Söderling defeated Gilles Simon and Rainer Schüttler, the latter 6–0, 6–0.

At the French Open, Söderling, seeded 23rd, reached the fourth round of a Grand Slam for the first time after defeating Kevin Kim, Denis Istomin, and David Ferrer. This set up a match with four-time defending champion Rafael Nadal. He scored the biggest upset of the year beating Nadal and ending the latter's record 31-match winning streak at Roland Garros. Women's tennis legend Martina Navratilova described the match as one of the greatest upsets in tennis history. His 6–2, 6–7^{(2–7)}, 6–4, 7–6^{(7–2)} victory over the reigning world No. 1 made Söderling the first of only three people (the others being Novak Djokovic in 2015 and 2021, and Alexander Zverev in 2024) to beat Nadal at the French Open and in a best of five-set match on clay. Two days later, Söderling defeated Nikolay Davydenko to reach his maiden major semifinal. Söderling made his first Grand Slam final, beating Fernando González in five sets, after having been down 0–30 and 1–4 in the final set, then reeling off the final five games of the set and match. Söderling lost the final to Federer in straight sets; however, his ranking was elevated to 12th in the world, a then career high.

Söderling was seeded 13th at the Wimbledon Championships, his next event. He reached the fourth round for the first time in his career, defeating Gilles Müller, Marcel Granollers, and Nicolás Almagro. Federer defeated him again, though Söderling was only broken once in the match.

After Wimbledon, Söderling returned to his native country to play at the Collector Swedish Open. He defeated Kristof Vliegen, Nicolás Almagro and Andreas Vinciguerra to reach the final. There, he beat Juan Mónaco for the title, becoming the first Swede since his coach Magnus Norman (in 2000) to win the singles title at the Swedish Open. This was Söderling's first outdoor title, as well as his first title on a surface other than indoor hardcourt. As a result of his win, Söderling moved up to 11th in the world.

Söderling then participated in the International German Open but lost in the third round to Nicolás Almagro. This was Söderling's first loss to a player other than Federer since the Rome Masters in late April, where he lost to Rafael Nadal.

Moving to the U.S. hard court season, Söderling started at the Legg Mason Tennis Classic but had to pull out in the quarterfinals due to an elbow injury which forced Söderling to withdraw from the Canada Masters as well. Returning to the scene at Cincinnati Masters, he lost in the first round to former world No. 1 Lleyton Hewitt.

Söderling was seeded 12th at the US Open and advanced to the quarterfinals for the first time at Flushing Meadows after defeating Albert Montañés, Marcel Granollers, 22nd seed Sam Querrey and 8th seed Nikolay Davydenko. Söderling went on to face five-time defending champion and 1st seed Roger Federer for the fourth time this year (and third consecutive in a Grand Slam event). Söderling was defeated by Federer in four sets. This was the second time in the pair's 12 meetings that Söderling took a set against Federer. In Davis Cup Playoffs, he helped in achieving a 3–2 win over Romania and a chance for Sweden to compete in the 2010 Davis Cup by clinching a straight sets victory over world No. 28 Victor Hănescu.

He reached the semifinals in both Malaysian Open and China Open. At Shanghai Masters where he officially made it into the top 10 for the first time, he beat Jo-Wilfried Tsonga but lost in the quarterfinals to Feliciano López. At the Stockholm Open due to an elbow injury he had to retire in the semifinals. Though not a serious injury, Söderling retired from the Valencia Open 500 tournament as well. At the time No. 9 on the ATP Race to London, Söderling needed a big performance in BNP Paribas Masters to reach the ATP World Tour Finals. He beat Ivo Karlović and Davydenko, but lost his chance of qualifying to the ATP World Tour Finals, however, when 3rd seed Novak Djokovic was too strong in the quarterfinals and was defeated three sets.

However, Söderling qualified as the first reserve for the finals when American Andy Roddick withdrew due to an injury sustained in Shanghai. Söderling was drawn into a group comprising Rafael Nadal, Novak Djokovic and Nikolay Davydenko. He made an impressive start, beating Nadal in his first round-robin match in straight sets. He followed that up with a straight sets win over Djokovic. He was then assured a place in the semi-finals of this year-end championships. However, he lost to Nikolay Davydenko in his third and final round-robin match. Despite this, he was the winner of his group and set up a semifinal clash with US Open champion Juan Martín del Potro who defeated him in a match that ended on a third set tie break. Söderling finished the year ranked No. 8, a new career-best.

=== 2010: French Open final and career high ranking ===
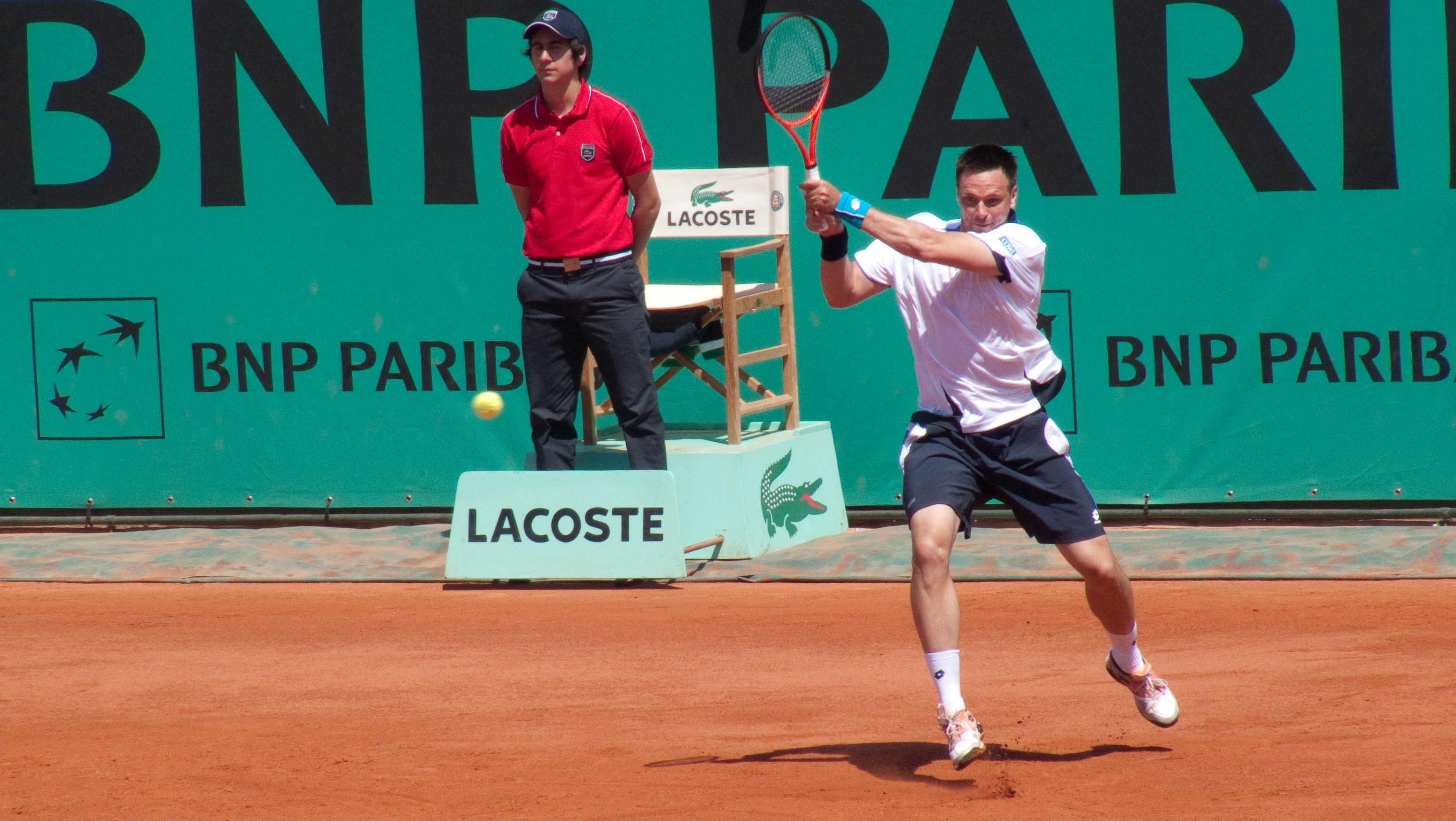
Söderling at the 2010 French Open

Söderling made his 2010 debut at the Capitala World Tennis Championship, an exhibition tournament in Abu Dhabi. He beat Stanislas Wawrinka in straight sets, then came back from a set and break down to defeat Roger Federer. Although generally reported in the media as being the first time Söderling had defeated Federer in 13 attempts, as an exhibition it remains an unofficial match that does not count on record. Söderling faced Rafael Nadal in the final, but lost in two sets.

Söderling then headed to Chennai, India to participate in the Aircel Chennai Open where he lost in the first round to Robby Ginepri.

Robin Söderling was seeded 8th but lost in the first round of the Australian Open to unseeded Spaniard Marcel Granollers despite being up 2 sets to love.

At ABN AMRO World Tennis Tournament he won his first ATP match of the year defeating Florent Serra in the first round and went on to win the tournament, when Mikhail Youzhny retired with a hamstring injury, becoming Söderling's then-biggest tournament win (in terms of point size).

At the Open 13 in Marseille Söderling lost in the quarterfinals to eventual champion Michaël Llodra. He won both his singles ties against Argentina in Davis Cup, though Sweden lost eventually 2–3. At the 2010 BNP Paribas Open, he lost in the semifinals to Andy Roddick after a three-set match. At the 2010 Sony Ericsson Open, Söderling was once again eliminated in the semifinals, this time by Tomáš Berdych.

Robin returned to Europe for the clay-court season but had to pull out of 2010 Monte-Carlo Rolex Masters due to an overstrained knee. His clay-court season got underway at the 2010 Barcelona Open Banco Sabadell where he reached the final after victories over Juan Ignacio Chela, Feliciano López, Eduardo Schwank and Thiemo de Bakker. He fell to Fernando Verdasco in three sets.

Söderling had a dip in form after poor results in both Rome Masters and Madrid Masters winning just one match against Paolo Lorenzi in Rome. His final tournament before Roland Garros was Open de Nice Côte d'Azur where he was the first seed. There, he fell in the second round to Olivier Rochus.

Söderling was seeded 5th at the French Open where he defeated Federer for the first time in his career in a tour-level match in the quarterfinals. Söderling's victory snapped Federer's streak of 23 consecutive semifinal appearances in Grand Slam tournaments and marked the second consecutive year that Söderling defeated the defending French Open champion. In the semifinals, he defeated the 15th seed Tomáš Berdych in five sets to reach his second consecutive French Open final. By this win, Söderling guaranteed himself a then career-high ranking of world No. 6. Söderling faced Rafael Nadal in the final and could not stop the Spaniard as he lost in straight sets.

Söderling entered the Wimbledon Championships as the sixth seed where he lost, in the quarterfinals, to eventual champion Rafael Nadal in four sets. Despite the loss, he cracked into the top 5 for the first time in his career.

Söderling lost in the final of Swedish Open to Nicolás Almagro.

Söderling started off his U.S. hard court season with the ATP World Tour Masters 1000 event Canadian Open, losing to David Nalbandian in the third round. At the Western & Southern Financial Group Masters, Söderling defeated Lleyton Hewitt but lost in the third round to Andy Roddick.

Entering the final Grand Slam event of the year, Söderling was seeded 5th at the US Open. He defeated qualifier Andreas Haider-Maurer in a tough five-set opening round. In the second round, Söderling beat Taylor Dent with ease. He then beat Thiemo de Bakker in the third round in straight sets and Albert Montañés in four sets to set up a quarterfinal showdown with Roger Federer, but could not stop the Swiss maestro as he lost in straight sets in tough conditions. He then went back to Sweden to compete in the Davis Cup, where Sweden retained their World Group status as they outmatched Italy.

Traveling to Asia for the Asian swing, Söderling had three quarterfinal showings. First at the Proton Malaysian Open in Kuala Lumpur, and then at the China Open in Beijing. He competed in Shanghai for the Shanghai Rolex Masters, where he maintained his consistency, beating Janko Tipsarević and David Ferrer . He lost to Federer in the quarterfinals.

At the If Stockholm Open, he reached the quarterfinals after bowing out to Florian Mayer. Though a disappointing week for the Swede, he ensured his place in the ATP World Tour Finals as he became the 5th player to qualify.

After a semifinal spot in Valencia, Söderling traveled to Paris to compete at the BNP Paribas Masters. Söderling defeated Gilles Simon, Stanislas Wawrinka and Andy Roddick. Söderling then saved three match points in beating Michaël Llodra to reach his first Masters 1000 final and won the championship by defeating Gaël Monfils (who had also saved 5 match points in his semi-final against Roger Federer) in the final in straight sets. He became the first Swedish player to win Paris Masters since Thomas Enqvist in 1996, and the first Swedish winner of a Masters 1000 since Enqvist won Cincinnati in 2000. With the win, he ensured a career-high ranking of No. 4 by overtaking Andy Murray.

Söderling's final tournament of the year was at the ATP World Tour Finals where he failed to progress through the group stage, winning one match against David Ferrer and losing to Andy Murray and Roger Federer. He finished the year as world No. 5, a career-best.

Söderling and coach Magnus Norman decided on 1 December 2010 that they would not continue their collaboration. Robin Söderling announced in early December 2010 that his new coach was to be Claudio Pistolesi.

=== 2011: mononucleosis and semi-retirement ===
He started 2011 with a new coach at his side, finishing third at a January exhibition in Abu Dhabi. Söderling's first ATP World Tour tournament of the year was Brisbane International where he defeated Ryan Harrison, Michael Berrer, Matthew Ebden and Radek Štěpánek en route to the final. Söderling went on to win the tournament without dropping a set and being broken only once, winning against Andy Roddick in the final. This elevated his ranking back to No. 4 in the world.

Söderling reached the fourth round at the Australian Open, a career-best. As the fourth seed, he made his way to that without dropping a set, before being defeated in five sets by the unseeded Alexandr Dolgopolov.

Returning to Europe, he defended his title at the ABN AMRO World Tennis Tournament in Rotterdam. This was Söderling's second title of the year and eighth of his career. This also marked the first time he defended a title.

At Open 13 in Marseille, he defeated Nicolas Mahut, Michaël Llodra and Dmitry Tursunov en route to a second final in two weeks. There he faced Marin Čilić and after losing the first set, he came back, eventually winning. This was Söderling's third title of the year and 9th of his career.

After helping Sweden win the Davis Cup tie against Russia, Söderling had a dip in form spanning from early March to the beginning of May, only getting past the third round once in four events. Due to the lack of form, Söderling opted to split with his coach Claudio Pistolesi, only five months into the partnership. Days later, Fredrik Rosengren was appointed as the new coach of Söderling.

At the Madrid Masters, Söderling saw off Santiago Giraldo and Jo-Wilfried Tsonga to set up a quarterfinal matchup with Roger Federer which he lost.

In the first round of the Rome Masters, Söderling survived a scare as he saved 3 match points en route to defeating Fernando Verdasco. After winning against Nicolás Almagro, he lost to Novak Djokovic in the quarterfinals.

At the French Open, Söderling was seeded 5th and beat Ryan Harrison, Albert Ramos, Leonardo Mayer and Gilles Simon to land himself a quarterfinal showdown with world No. 1 Rafael Nadal. Söderling's hopes of repeating his 2009 upset of the Spaniard proved futile, as he was swept off the court in straight sets.

At the Wimbledon Championships, Söderling (seeded fifth) defeated Philipp Petzschner of Germany in the first round, coming up against one-time Wimbledon champion Lleyton Hewitt in the second. Hewitt won the first two sets, but Söderling fought back to win in five sets. In the third round, however, Robin Söderling, troubled by a bad stomach, lost to Bernard Tomic in straight sets.

After Wimbledon, Söderling announced that he would not take part in Sweden's Davis Cup fixture against reigning champions Serbia, preparing instead for the Swedish Open. He did not drop a single set in the entire tournament. He rolled past world No. 8 Tomáš Berdych in the semifinal and world No. 6 David Ferrer in the final for his fourth title of the year, and the last tour-level match of his career.

Due to a wrist injury, Söderling was forced to withdraw from the back-to-back hardcourt Masters tournaments in Montreal and Cincinnati. He was also diagnosed with mononucleosis, an illness that forced him to withdraw from the US Open at the last minute. He had been slated to play Louk Sorensen of Ireland in the first round. With the illness continuing to hamper his progress, he decided to take yet more time out, withdrawing for the rest of the season, including the 2012 Australian Open.

Söderling only managed to play 14 tournaments in the first half of 2011 and finished the year with a 38–9 record and four titles.

=== 2012–2015: Years off tour, retirement ===
Due to his ongoing recovery from illness, Söderling announced that he would miss the start of the 2012 season, including the Australian Open, and the French Open. He remained absent for the Indian Wells Masters, the first Masters tournament of the year. He later confirmed that he would be absent until at least after the Olympic Games and in July 2012, he dropped out of the ATP rankings due to having not competed for 12 months.

Söderling announced no timetable of returning due to slow recovery from his illness.

Söderling was absent from the tour in 2013. In September he launched a new range of tennis balls under the brand 'RS-Tennis'.

Söderling continued to be absent from the tour in 2014. During the year he produced and released more types of tennis gear for RS-Tennis and became the tournament director of the Stockholm Open.

2015 was Söderling's last year of his professional tennis career to date, although he was still absent from the tour. Throughout the year he produced and released more types of tennis gear for RS-Tennis. On 23 December, Söderling announced his retirement from professional tennis, after over four years of not playing a single ATP-level match due to mononucleosis. He also suffered from persistent anxiety and panic attacks, which he stated began in July 2011; Söderling announced he was "completely healed" in July 2020.

=== 2016–2023: Coaching after retirement ===
In 2016, Söderling announced his intention to return to professional tennis, as he had said a few years earlier that he planned to have a very, very long career. He also stepped down as the tournament director of the Stockholm Open to Simon Aspelin.

He currently resides in the Stockholm suburb of Djursholm, with his wife and two children.

After a period spent coaching fellow Swede Elias Ymer, Söderling captained the Swedish 2021 Davis Cup Finals team.

On April 3, 2023, the Swedish Tennis Association said Soderling had stepped down from his role as Sweden's Davis Cup captain for health reasons.

== Playing style ==
Söderling is an offensive baseliner who was known for his competitive drive and powerful game. His serve was heavy, reaching speeds up to 230 km/h (143 mph), although it could sometimes lack precision, leading him to struggle against strong returners like Novak Djokovic and Andy Murray. He could overpower almost all of his opponents and possessed a good return game. He had accurate and powerful groundstrokes off both wings; his forehand was regarded as one of the most lethal in the game, and he also possessed a dangerously accurate two-handed backhand that can also produce winners with sharp angles although with less speed than his forehand. Most of his success came on faster surfaces (fast indoor courts; hard and carpet), although his best Grand Slam results came at the French Open; likely due to the heavy conditions and slowness of the clay which allowed him more time to set up his powerful shots.

Many people praised Söderling for his game, saying he was a Grand Slam contender and stable top-10 player, though his mental strength and lack of consistency were weaknesses. In latter years, his mental strength improved and this raised the consistency of his game; much of this was attributed to the influence of his coach, former world No. 2 and 2000 French Open finalist Magnus Norman.

== Equipment ==
Söderling wore Lotto clothing and used the Head Pro Tour 630 racquet under various paint jobs throughout his career.

== Career statistics ==
=== Grand Slam tournament performance timeline ===
Key
W	F	SF	QF	#R	RR	Q#	DNQ	A	NH

(W) winner; (F) finalist; (SF) semifinalist; (QF) quarterfinalist; (#R) rounds 4, 3, 2, 1; (RR) round-robin stage; (Q#) qualification round; (DNQ) did not qualify; (A) absent; (NH) not held; (SR) strike rate (events won / competed); (W–L) win–loss record.

Tournament	2002	2003	2004	2005	2006	2007	2008	2009	2010	2011	SR	W–L	Win %
Australian Open	A	Q2	2R	1R	A	1R	A	2R	1R	4R	0 / 6	5–6	45
French Open	A	Q1	1R	2R	1R	1R	3R	F	F	QF	0 / 8	19–8	70
Wimbledon	A	3R	1R	1R	1R	3R	2R	4R	QF	3R	0 / 9	14–9	61
US Open	2R	1R	2R	3R	2R	A	1R	QF	QF	A	0 / 8	13–8	62
Win–loss	1–1	2–2	2–4	3–4	1–3	2–3	3–3	14–4	14–4	9–3	0 / 31	51–31	62

=== Finals: 2 (2 runners-up) ===
Result	Year	Championship	Surface	Opponent	Score
Loss	2009	French Open	Clay	(Switzerland) Roger Federer	1–6, 6–7^{(1–7)}, 4–6
Loss	2010	French Open	Clay	(Spain) Rafael Nadal	4–6, 2–6, 4–6

=== Year-end championship performance timelines ===
Tournament	2002	2003	2004	2005	2006	2007	2008	2009	2010	2011	SR	W–L	Win %
Year-end championship
ATP World Tour Finals	Did not qualify							SF	RR	DNQ	0 / 2	3–4	42.86
