= 2016 Mubadala World Tennis Championship =

- Date: 31 Dec 2015 – 2 Jan 2016
- Edition: 8th
- Surface: Hard
- Location: Abu Dhabi, United Arab Emirates
- Venue: Abu Dhabi International Tennis Complex

Champions

Singles
- (Spain) Rafael Nadal
- Mubadala World Tennis Championship

The 2016 Mubadala World Tennis Championship was a non-ATP affiliated exhibition tournament. It was the 8th edition of the Mubadala World Tennis Championship with the world's top players competing in the event, which was held in a knockout format. The winner received a purse worth $250,000. The event was held at the Abu Dhabi International Tennis Complex at the Zayed Sports City in Abu Dhabi, United Arab Emirates.

== Champion ==
- (Spain) Rafael Nadal def. (Canada) Milos Raonic by 7–6^{(7–2)}, 6–3

== Players ==
Country	Player	Ranking	Seeding
SWI	Stan Wawrinka	4	1
ESP	Rafael Nadal	5	2
ESP	David Ferrer	7	3
FRA	Jo-Wilfried Tsonga	10	4
RSA	Kevin Anderson	12	5
CAN	Milos Raonic	14	6
