= 2013 Mubadala World Tennis Championship – Singles =

Singles
- 2013 Mubadala World Tennis Championship

Final
- Champion: (Serbia) Novak Djokovic
- Runner-up: (Spain) David Ferrer
- Score: 7–5, 6–2
- Mubadala World Tennis Championship

Novak Djokovic was the two-time defending champion, and successfully defended his title by defeating David Ferrer in the final 7–5, 6–2.

== Seeds ==
1. (Spain) Rafael Nadal (third place)
2. (Serbia) Novak Djokovic (champion)
3. (Spain) David Ferrer (finalist)
4. (United Kingdom) Andy Murray (fifth place)
5. (Switzerland) Stanislas Wawrinka (sixth place)
6. (France) Jo-Wilfried Tsonga (fourth place)

== Draw ==
Key

- Q = Qualifier
- WC = Wild card
- LL = Lucky loser
- Alt = Alternate
- ITF = ITF entry
- PR = Protected ranking
- SR = Special ranking
- SE = Special exempt
- JE = Junior exempt
- JR = Junior Accelerator Programme entrant
- CO = College Accelerator Programme entrant
- NG = Next Gen Accelerator Program entrant
- w/o = Walkover
- r = Retired
- d = Defaulted

=== Draw ===
Quarterfinals
1	(Spain) Rafael Nadal
bye
3	(Spain) David Ferrer	7	6
5	(Switzerland) Stanislas Wawrinka	5	1
4	(United Kingdom) Andy Murray	5	3
6	(France) Jo-Wilfried Tsonga	7	6
bye
2	(Serbia) Novak Djokovic

Semifinals
1	(Spain) Rafael Nadal	4	4
3	(Spain) David Ferrer	6	6
6	(France) Jo-Wilfried Tsonga	6^{5}	3
2	(Serbia) Novak Djokovic	7^{7}	6

Final
3	(Spain) David Ferrer	5	2
2	(Serbia) Novak Djokovic	7	6
Third Place Match
1	(Spain) Rafael Nadal	7^{7}	6
6	(France) Jo-Wilfried Tsonga	6^{5}	3

=== Play-offs ===
Fifth Place Match
5	(Switzerland) Stanislas Wawrinka	3	4
4	(United Kingdom) Andy Murray	6	6
