= 2019 Mubadala World Tennis Championship – Men's singles =

Men's singles
- 2019 Mubadala World Tennis Championship

Final
- Champion: (Spain) Rafael Nadal
- Runner-up: (Greece) Stefanos Tsitsipas
- Score: 6–7^{(3–7)}, 7–5, 7–6^{(7–3)}

Events
Singles	men	women
Doubles	men	women
← 2018 ·	Mubadala World Tennis Championship	· 2020 →

Novak Djokovic was the defending champion, but lost in the semifinals to Stefanos Tsitsipas.

Rafael Nadal won his record fifth title beating debutante Tsitsipas in the final.

== Seeds ==
1. (Spain) Rafael Nadal (champion)
2. (Serbia) Novak Djokovic (semifinals) (third place)
3. (Greece) Stefanos Tsitsipas (final) (runner-up)
4. (Russia) Karen Khachanov (semifinals) (fourth place)
5. (Russia) Andrey Rublev (quarterfinals) (fifth place)
6. (South Korea) Hyeon Chung (quarterfinals) (sixth place)

== Draw ==
=== Key ===
- Q = Qualifier
- WC = Wild card
- LL = Lucky loser
- Alt = Alternate
- ITF = ITF entry
- PR = Protected ranking
- SR = Special ranking
- SE = Special exempt
- JE = Junior exempt
- JR = Junior Accelerator Programme entrant
- CO = College Accelerator Programme entrant
- NG = Next Gen Accelerator Program entrant
- w/o = Walkover
- r = Retired
- d = Defaulted

=== Draw ===
Quarterfinals
4	(Russia) Karen Khachanov	7^{7}	6
6	(South Korea) Hyeon Chung	6^{4}	4
3	(Greece) Stefanos Tsitsipas	6	6
5	(Russia) Andrey Rublev	3	4

Semifinals
1	(Spain) Rafael Nadal	6	6
4	(Russia) Karen Khachanov	1	3
3	(Greece) Stefanos Tsitsipas	3	7^{7}	6
2	(Serbia) Novak Djokovic	6	6^{4}	4

Final
1	(Spain) Rafael Nadal	6^{3}	7	7^{7}
3	(Greece) Stefanos Tsitsipas	7^{7}	5	6^{3}
Third Place Match
4	(Russia) Karen Khachanov	5	3
2	(Serbia) Novak Djokovic	7	6

=== Play-offs ===
Fifth Place Match
6	(South Korea) Hyeon Chung	6^{5}	6^{1}
5	(Russia) Andrey Rublev	7^{7}	7^{7}
