= World Tennis Championship =

UAE tennis tournament

Mubadala World Tennis Championship

Defunct tennis tournament
- Founded: 2009; 17 years ago
- Abolished: 2022
- Location: Abu Dhabi; United Arab Emirates
- Venue: Abu Dhabi International Tennis Complex
- Category: Exhibition
- Surface: Hard
- Draw: 6S (Men); 2S (Women) (exhibition)
- Current champion: Stefanos Tsitsipas
- Website: mubadalawtc.com

The Mubadala World Tennis Championship was a men's and women's singles exhibition tournament. It was held annually from 2009 through 2022 at the Abu Dhabi International Tennis Complex, Abu Dhabi, United Arab Emirates.

== History ==
First logo of the World Championship Tennis

In November 2008, sponsor companies Flash and Capitala announced with IMG their partnership to create a new tennis exhibition for the beginning of the season, to take place in Abu Dhabi, United Arab Emirates (UAE). The event, first named Capitala World Tennis Championship, was conceived to promote the sport in the region, creating another world class tennis event in the Middle East alongside the Association of Tennis Professionals (ATP) and Women's Tennis Association (WTA) Dubai Tennis Championships, already taking place in the UAE, the ATP Qatar ExxonMobil Open and the WTA Qatar Total Open, taking place in Doha, Qatar, and the WTA Tour Championships, also set in Doha from 2008 to 2010. The six-player, three-day exhibition, with a winner-takes-all prize money of US$250,000, preceded by weeks of tennis-themed activities in the region, including an amateur Community Cup tournament in Abu Dhabi and Dubai, was created to take place early in the season, before the start of the actual tour events, as a warm-up exhibition for the top players, similar to the AAMI Classic in Melbourne.

The inaugural Capitala World Tennis Championship took place from January 1 to January 3, 2009, with Rafael Nadal, Roger Federer, Andy Murray, Nikolay Davydenko, Andy Roddick and James Blake taking part. Murray won the event, defeating Blake, Federer, and then-World No. 1 Nadal in the final.

As of October 2009, Federer, Nadal and Davydenko announced they would return for the 2010 edition, with Stanislas Wawrinka, David Ferrer and Robin Söderling completing the field. Nadal went one further this time, defeating compatriot Ferrer in the semi-finals and Söderling in the final without losing a set. Federer won third place with victory over Ferrer.

For the 2011 edition of the tournament, Nadal, Federer and Söderling returned with Tomáš Berdych, Jo-Wilfried Tsonga and Marcos Baghdatis completing the six-man line-up. Nadal defended the title with a hard-fought victory over Federer after they respectively beat Berdych and Söderling in the semi-finals.

The second 2011 edition (held on December 29–31, 2011) featured Nadal, Federer, Ferrer, Tsonga, Novak Djokovic and Gaël Monfils. Djokovic won the title by beating Monfils and Federer before defeating Ferrer in the final. In the battle for third place, Nadal triumphed over Federer.

On December 30, 2017, Jeļena Ostapenko defeated Serena Williams in the first-ever women's match at the tournament.

== Past finals ==
=== Men's singles ===
Year	Champions	Runners-up	Score
2009	(United Kingdom) Andy Murray	(Spain) Rafael Nadal	6–4, 5–7, 6–3
2010	(Spain) Rafael Nadal	(Sweden) Robin Söderling	7–6^{(7–3)}, 7–5
2011 (Jan.)	(Spain) Rafael Nadal (2)	(Switzerland) Roger Federer	7–6^{(7–4)}, 7–6^{(7–3)}
2011 (Dec.)	(Serbia) Novak Djokovic	(Spain) David Ferrer	6–2, 6–1
2012	(Serbia) Novak Djokovic (2)	(Spain) Nicolás Almagro	6–7^{(4–7)}, 6–3, 6–4
2013	(Serbia) Novak Djokovic (3)	(Spain) David Ferrer	7–5, 6–2
2015	(United Kingdom) Andy Murray (2)	(Serbia) Novak Djokovic	(walkover)
2016 (Jan.)	(Spain) Rafael Nadal (3)	(Canada) Milos Raonic	7–6^{(7–2)}, 6–3
2016 (Dec.)	(Spain) Rafael Nadal (4)	(Belgium) David Goffin	6–4, 7–6^{(7–5)}
2017	(South Africa) Kevin Anderson	(Spain) Roberto Bautista Agut	6–4, 7–6^{(7–0)}
2018	(Serbia) Novak Djokovic (4)	(South Africa) Kevin Anderson	4–6, 7–5, 7–5
2019	(Spain) Rafael Nadal (5)	(Greece) Stefanos Tsitsipas	6–7^{(3–7)}, 7–5, 7–6^{(7–3)}
2020	Not held due to the COVID-19 pandemic		
2021	(Russia) Andrey Rublev	(United Kingdom) Andy Murray	6–4, 7–6^{(7–2)}
2022	(Greece) Stefanos Tsitsipas	(Russia) Andrey Rublev	6–2, 4–6, 6–2

=== Women's singles ===
Year	Champions	Runners-up	Score
2017	(Latvia) Jeļena Ostapenko	(United States) Serena Williams	6–2, 3–6, [10–5]
2018	(United States) Venus Williams	(United States) Serena Williams	4–6, 6–3, [10–8]
2019	(Russia) Maria Sharapova	(Australia) Ajla Tomljanović	6–4, 7–5
2020	Not held due to the COVID-19 pandemic		
2021	(Tunisia) Ons Jabeur	(Switzerland) Belinda Bencic	4–6, 6–3, [10–8]
2022	(Tunisia) Ons Jabeur	(United Kingdom) Emma Raducanu	5–7, 6–3, [10–8]

== Records ==
=== Men's singles ===
Most titles	(Spain) Rafael Nadal	5
Most finals	(Spain) Rafael Nadal	6
Most consecutive titles	(Serbia) Novak Djokovic	3
Most matches played	(Spain) Rafael Nadal	22
Most matches won	(Spain) Rafael Nadal	15
Most editions played	(Spain) Rafael Nadal	11
Best winning %	(Serbia) Novak Djokovic	92%
Youngest champion	(United Kingdom) Andy Murray	21y, 7m, 23d
Oldest champion	(Spain) Rafael Nadal	33y, 6m, 21d

Longest final
2019 (38 games)
(Spain) Rafael Nadal	6^{3}	7	7^{7}
(Greece) Stefanos Tsitsipas	7^{7}	5	6^{3}

Shortest final
2011 (15 games)
(Serbia) Novak Djokovic	6	6
(Spain) David Ferrer	2	1
