= Abu Dhabi International Tennis Centre =

Sports arena

Coordinates: 24.4138204°N 54.4593036°E

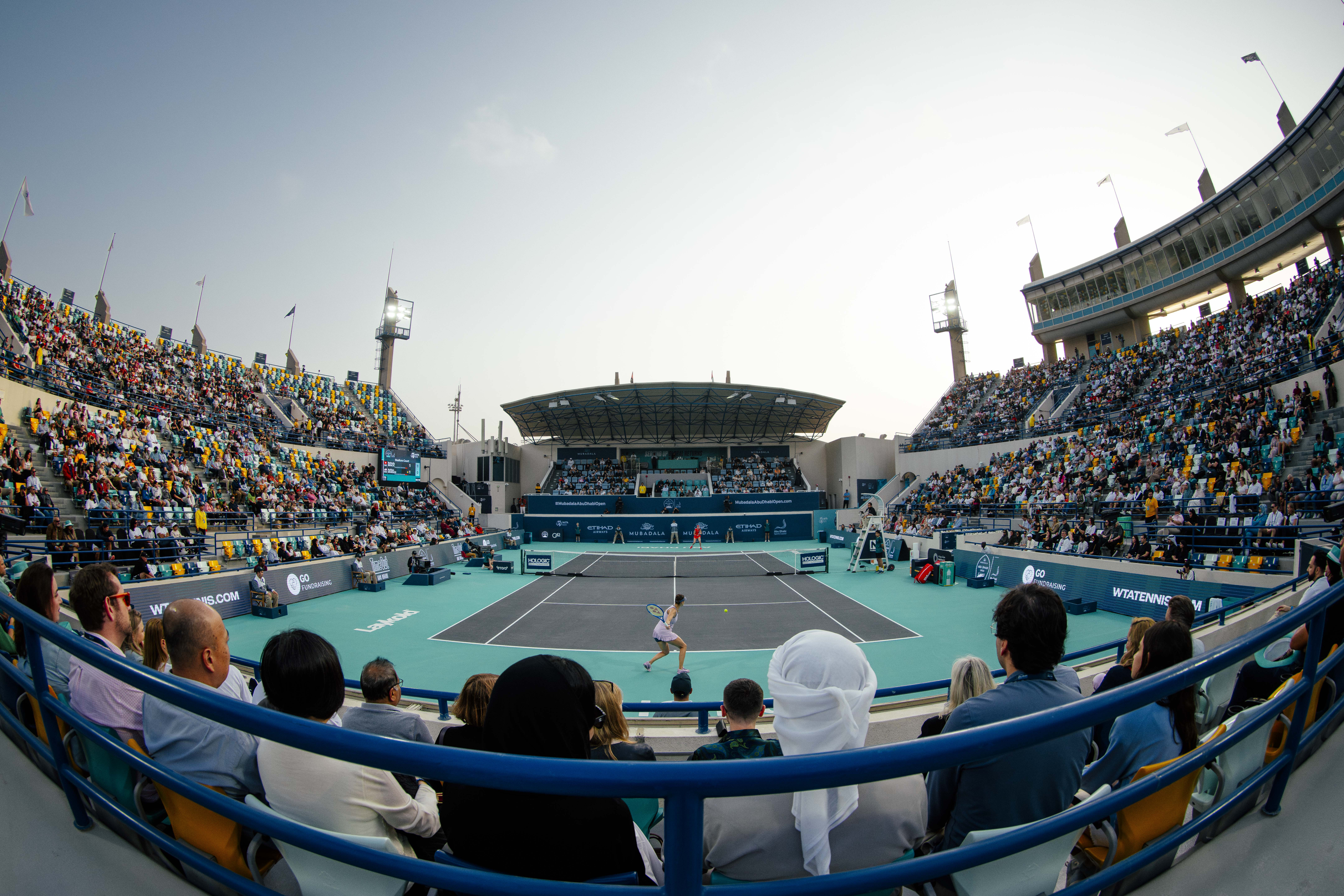
- International Tennis Centre in 2025
- Interactive map of Abu Dhabi International Tennis Centre
- Location: Zayed Sports City, Abu Dhabi, UAE
- Capacity: 5,000 (centre court); 600 (court 2)

Construction
- Built: ?
- Opened: 2004

Tenants
- Abu Dhabi Open (WTA 500); Capitala World Tennis Championship

The International Tennis Centre (Arabic: المركز الدولي للتنس), also known as Abu Dhabi International Tennis Complex, is a sports arena in Abu Dhabi, United Arab Emirates.

The complex opened in 2004 as part of the Zayed Sports City. It has a seating capacity of 5,000 on Centre Court and 600 on Court 2. The sports city features three other major sporting and leisure facilities.

== Construction ==
The idea for a sporting complex in Abu Dhabi was brought up by Sheikh Zayed Bin Sultan Al Nahyan, the late former UAE president and Sheikh Khalifa Bin Zayed Al Nahyan, the incumbent president. Abu Dhabi Municipalities and Town Planning Department were given the task of building a Tennis Complex.

== Tournaments ==
The first tournament held at the venue was the Abu Dhabi Professional Tennis Tournament 2006 which was part of the ATP futures series in 2006. In 2009 a professional exhibition event, the Capitala World Tennis Championship, was held for the first time, with six of the world's top ten players in attendance. The venue also currently hosts the Abu Dhabi Open, a WTA 500 tournament.
