= 2009 Rafael Nadal tennis season =

Statistics for Spanish tennis player

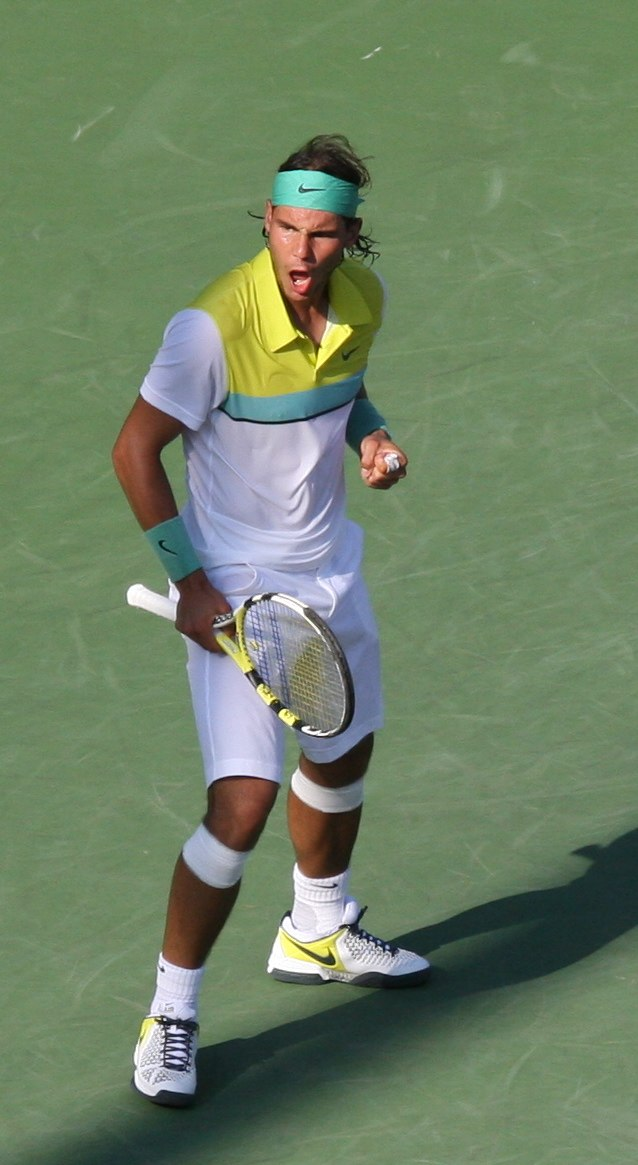
- Rafael Nadal at 2009 Sony Ericsson Open, Miami, Florida, United States
- Full name: Rafael "Rafa" Nadal Parera
- Country: Spain
- Calendar prize money: $5,466,515 (Singles $5,414,604, Doubles $51,911)

Singles
- Season record: 66–14
- Calendar titles: 5

Grand Slam & significant results
- Australian Open: W
- French Open: 4R
- Wimbledon: DNS
- US Open: SF

Doubles
- Season record: 7–5
- Calendar titles: 1

Davis Cup
- Davis Cup: W
- Injuries: knee injury

The 2009 Rafael Nadal tennis season officially began on January 5 with the start of the 2009 ATP World Tour.

== Year's summary ==
=== Qatar Open ===
Nadal's first official ATP tour event for the year was the 250 series Qatar Open in Doha. After his first-round match with Fabrice Santoro, Nadal was awarded the 2008 ATP World Tour Champion trophy. Nadal eventually lost in the quarterfinals to Gaël Monfils. Nadal also entered and won the tournament's doubles event with partner Marc López, defeating the world No. 1 doubles team of Daniel Nestor and Nenad Zimonjić in the final. As noted by statistician Greg Sharko, this was the first time since 1990 the world No. 1 singles player had played the world No. 1 doubles player in a final.

=== Australian Open ===
At the 2009 Australian Open, Nadal won his first five matches without dropping a single set, before defeating compatriot Fernando Verdasco in the semifinals in the second longest match in Australian Open history at 5 hours and 14 minutes. This win set up a championship match with Roger Federer, their first meeting ever in a hard-court Grand Slam tournament and their nineteenth meeting overall. Nadal defeated Federer in five sets to earn his first hard-court Grand Slam singles title, making him the first Spaniard to win the Australian Open and the fourth male tennis player—after Jimmy Connors, Mats Wilander, and Andre Agassi—to win Grand Slam singles titles on three different surfaces. This win also made Nadal the first male tennis player to hold three Grand Slam singles titles on three different surfaces at the same time.

=== ABN AMRO World Tennis Tournament ===
At the ABN AMRO World Tennis Tournament in Rotterdam, Nadal lost in the final to second-seeded Andy Murray in three sets. During the final, Nadal called a trainer to attend to a tendon problem with his right knee, which notably affected his play in the final set. Although this knee problem was not associated with Nadal's right knee tendonitis, it was serious enough to cause him to withdraw from the Barclays Dubai Tennis Championships a week later.

=== Davis Cup ===
In March, Nadal helped Spain defeat Serbia in a Davis Cup World Group first-round tie on clay in Benidorm, Spain. Nadal defeated Janko Tipsarević and Novak Djokovic. The win over world No. 3 Djokovic was Nadal's twelfth consecutive Davis Cup singles match win and boosted his career win–loss record against Djokovic to 11–4, including 6–0 on clay.

=== Indian Wells ===
At the 2009 Indian Wells Masters, Nadal won his thirteenth Masters 1000 series tournament. In the fourth round, Nadal saved five match points, before defeating David Nalbandian for the first time after losing their first two meeting on indoor hard court . Nadal defeated Juan Martín del Potro in the quarterfinals and Andy Roddick in the semifinals, before defeating Murray in the final.

=== Miami ===
The next ATP tour event was the 2009 Miami Masters. Nadal advanced to the quarterfinals, where he again faced Argentinian del Potro, this time losing the match. This was the first time del Potro had defeated Nadal in five career matches.

=== Monte Carlo ===
Nadal began his European clay court season at the 2009 Monte Carlo Masters, where he won a record fifth consecutive singles title there. He defeated Novak Djokovic in the final for his fifth consecutive win, a record in the open era. Nadal is the first male player to win the same ATP Master series event for five consecutive years.

=== Barcelona ===
Nadal then competed in the ATP 500 event in Barcelona. He advanced to his fifth consecutive Barcelona final, where he faced David Ferrer. Nadal went on to beat Ferrer to record five consecutive Barcelona victories.

=== Rome ===
At the Rome Masters, Nadal reached the final, where he defeated Novak Djokovic to improve his overall record to 13–4 and clay record to 8–0 against the Serb. He became the first player to win four Rome titles.

After winning two clay-court Masters, he participated in the Madrid Open. After an epic 4 hour and 3 minute battle against Novak Djokovic in the semi-final, saving three match points, he eventually lost to Roger Federer in the final. This was the first time that Nadal had lost to Federer since the semifinals of the 2007 Tennis Masters Cup.

On 19 May, the ATP World Tour announced that Nadal was the first player out of eight to qualify for the 2009 ATP World Tour Finals, to be played at the O2 Arena in London.

=== French Open ===
By beating Lleyton Hewitt in the third round of 2009 French Open, Nadal (2005–09 French Open) set a record of 31 consecutive wins at Roland Garros, beating the previous record of 28 by Björn Borg (1978–81 French Open). Nadal had won 32 consecutive sets at Roland Garros (since winning the last 2 sets at the 2007 French Open final against Federer), the second-longest winning streak in the tournament's history behind Björn Borg's record of 41 consecutive sets. This run came to an end on 31 May 2009, when Nadal lost to eventual runner-up, Robin Söderling in the 4th round in a massive upset. This was Nadal's first loss at the French Open.

=== Injury ===
After his surprise defeat at Roland Garros, Nadal withdrew from the AEGON Championships. It was confirmed that Nadal was suffering from tendinitis in both of his knees. On 19 June, Nadal withdrew from the 2009 Wimbledon Championship, citing his recurring knee injury. He was the first champion not to defend the title since Goran Ivanišević in 2001. Roger Federer went on to win the title, and Nadal consequently dropped back to world No. 2 on 6 July 2009. Nadal later announced his withdrawal from the Davis Cup.

=== Return ===
On 4 August, Nadal's uncle, Toni Nadal, confirmed that Nadal would return to play at the Rogers Cup in Montreal. There, in his first tournament since Roland Garros, Nadal lost in the quarterfinals to Juan Martín del Potro. With this loss, he relinquished the No. 2 spot to Andy Murray on 17 August 2009, ranking outside the top two for the first time since 25 July 2005.

=== US Open ===
In the quarterfinals of the US Open he defeated Fernando González in a rain-delayed encounter. However, like his previous US Open campaign, he fell in the semifinals, this time losing to eventual champion Juan Martín del Potro. Despite the loss, he regained the No. 2 ranking after Andy Murray's early exit.

=== World Tour Finals ===
At the World Tour Finals, Nadal lost all three of his matches against Robin Söderling, Nikolay Davydenko, and Novak Djokovic respectively without winning a set.

=== Davis Cup final ===
In December, Nadal participated in the second Davis Cup final of his career. He defeated Tomáš Berdych in his first singles rubber to give the Spanish Davis Cup Team their first point in the tie. After the Spanish Davis Cup team had secured its fourth Davis Cup victory, Nadal defeated Jan Hájek in the first Davis Cup dead rubber of his career. The win gave Nadal his 14th consecutive singles victory at Davis Cup (his 13th on clay).

== Year end ranking ==
Nadal finished the year as No. 2, second to Roger Federer for the fourth time in five years.

== All matches ==
=== Singles ===
Tournament	Match	Round	Opponent (seed or key)	Rank	Result	Score
Qatar ExxonMobil Open; Doha, Qatar; ATP 250; Hard, outdoor 5 – 11 January 2009
Qatar ExxonMobil Open; Doha, Qatar; ATP 250; Hard, outdoor 5 – 11 January 2009	1 / 413	1R	(France) Fabrice Santoro	51	Win	6–0, 6–1
Qatar ExxonMobil Open; Doha, Qatar; ATP 250; Hard, outdoor 5 – 11 January 2009	2 / 414	2R	(Slovakia) Karol Beck (Q)	144	Win	6–1, 6–2
Qatar ExxonMobil Open; Doha, Qatar; ATP 250; Hard, outdoor 5 – 11 January 2009	3 / 415	QF	(France) Gaël Monfils (5/WC)	13	Loss	4–6, 4–6
Australian Open; Melbourne, Australia; Grand Slam tournament Hard, outdoor 19 January – 1 February 2009
Australian Open; Melbourne, Australia; Grand Slam tournament Hard, outdoor 19 January – 1 February 2009	4 / 416	1R	(Belgium) Christophe Rochus	75	Win	6–0, 6–2, 6–2
Australian Open; Melbourne, Australia; Grand Slam tournament Hard, outdoor 19 January – 1 February 2009	5 / 417	2R	(Croatia) Roko Karanušić	92	Win	6–2, 6–3, 6–2
Australian Open; Melbourne, Australia; Grand Slam tournament Hard, outdoor 19 January – 1 February 2009	6 / 418	3R	(Germany) Tommy Haas	79	Win	6–4, 6–2, 6–2
Australian Open; Melbourne, Australia; Grand Slam tournament Hard, outdoor 19 January – 1 February 2009	7 / 419	4R	(Chile) Fernando González (13)	14	Win	6–3, 6–2, 6–4
Australian Open; Melbourne, Australia; Grand Slam tournament Hard, outdoor 19 January – 1 February 2009	8 / 420	QF	(France) Gilles Simon (6)	8	Win	6–2, 7–5, 7–5
Australian Open; Melbourne, Australia; Grand Slam tournament Hard, outdoor 19 January – 1 February 2009	9 / 421	SF	(Spain) Fernando Verdasco (14)	15	Win	6–7^{(4–7)}, 6–4, 7–6^{(7–2)}, 6–7^{(1–7)}, 6–4
Australian Open; Melbourne, Australia; Grand Slam tournament Hard, outdoor 19 January – 1 February 2009	10 / 422	W	(Switzerland) Roger Federer (2)	2	Win (1)	7–5, 3–6, 7–6^{(7–3)}, 3–6, 6–2
ABN AMRO World Tennis Tournament; Rotterdam, Netherlands; ATP 500; Hard, indoor 9 – 15 February 2009
ABN AMRO World Tennis Tournament; Rotterdam, Netherlands; ATP 500; Hard, indoor 9 – 15 February 2009	11 / 423	1R	(Italy) Simone Bolelli	37	Win	4–6, 6–2, 7–5
ABN AMRO World Tennis Tournament; Rotterdam, Netherlands; ATP 500; Hard, indoor 9 – 15 February 2009	12 / 424	2R	(Bulgaria) Grigor Dimitrov (WC)	478	Win	7–5, 3–6, 6–2
ABN AMRO World Tennis Tournament; Rotterdam, Netherlands; ATP 500; Hard, indoor 9 – 15 February 2009	13 / 425	QF	(France) Jo-Wilfried Tsonga (7)	13	Win	6–4, 6–7^{(5–7)}, 6–4
ABN AMRO World Tennis Tournament; Rotterdam, Netherlands; ATP 500; Hard, indoor 9 – 15 February 2009	14 / 426	SF	(France) Gaël Monfils (5)	12	Win	6–4, 6–4
ABN AMRO World Tennis Tournament; Rotterdam, Netherlands; ATP 500; Hard, indoor 9 – 15 February 2009	15 / 427	F	(United Kingdom) Andy Murray (2)	4	Loss (1)	3–6, 6–4, 0–6
Davis Cup, World Group 1st Round; Benidorm, Spain; Davis Cup; Clay, outdoor 6 – 8 March 2009
Davis Cup, World Group 1st Round; Benidorm, Spain; Davis Cup; Clay, outdoor 6 – 8 March 2009	16 / 428	1R; R2	(Serbia) Janko Tipsarević	47	Win	6–1, 6–0, 6–2
Davis Cup, World Group 1st Round; Benidorm, Spain; Davis Cup; Clay, outdoor 6 – 8 March 2009	17 / 429	1R; R4	(Serbia) Novak Djokovic	3	Win	6–4, 6–4, 6–1
BNP Paribas Open; Indian Wells, United States; ATP 1000; Hard, outdoor 9 – 22 March 2009
BNP Paribas Open; Indian Wells, United States; ATP 1000; Hard, outdoor 9 – 22 March 2009	–	1R	Bye			
BNP Paribas Open; Indian Wells, United States; ATP 1000; Hard, outdoor 9 – 22 March 2009	18 / 430	2R	(Germany) Michael Berrer (Q)	112	Win	6–2, 6–1
BNP Paribas Open; Indian Wells, United States; ATP 1000; Hard, outdoor 9 – 22 March 2009	19 / 431	3R	(Russia) Dmitry Tursunov (26)	27	Win	6–3, 6–3
BNP Paribas Open; Indian Wells, United States; ATP 1000; Hard, outdoor 9 – 22 March 2009	20 / 432	4R	(Argentina) David Nalbandian (14)	14	Win	3–6, 7–6^{(7–5)}, 6–0
BNP Paribas Open; Indian Wells, United States; ATP 1000; Hard, outdoor 9 – 22 March 2009	21 / 433	QF	(Argentina) Juan Martín del Potro (6)	6	Win	6–2, 6–4
BNP Paribas Open; Indian Wells, United States; ATP 1000; Hard, outdoor 9 – 22 March 2009	22 / 434	SF	(United States) Andy Roddick (7)	7	Win	6–4, 7–6^{(7–4)}
BNP Paribas Open; Indian Wells, United States; ATP 1000; Hard, outdoor 9 – 22 March 2009	23 / 435	W	(United Kingdom) Andy Murray (4)	4	Win (2)	6–1, 6–2
Sony Ericsson Open; Miami, United States; ATP 1000; Hard, outdoor 23 March – 5 April 2009
Sony Ericsson Open; Miami, United States; ATP 1000; Hard, outdoor 23 March – 5 April 2009	–	1R	Bye			
Sony Ericsson Open; Miami, United States; ATP 1000; Hard, outdoor 23 March – 5 April 2009	24 / 436	2R	(Russia) Teymuraz Gabashvili	72	Win	6–2, 6–2
Sony Ericsson Open; Miami, United States; ATP 1000; Hard, outdoor 23 March – 5 April 2009	25 / 437	3R	(Portugal) Frederico Gil (Q)	74	Win	7–5, 6–3
Sony Ericsson Open; Miami, United States; ATP 1000; Hard, outdoor 23 March – 5 April 2009	26 / 438	4R	(Switzerland) Stanislas Wawrinka (16)	17	Win	7–6^{(7–2)}, 7–6^{(7–4)}
Sony Ericsson Open; Miami, United States; ATP 1000; Hard, outdoor 23 March – 5 April 2009	27 / 439	QF	(Argentina) Juan Martín del Potro (6)	7	Loss	4–6, 6–3, 6–7^{(3–7)}
Monte Carlo Rolex Masters; Monte Carlo, Monaco; ATP 1000; Clay, outdoor 13 – 19 April 2009
Monte Carlo Rolex Masters; Monte Carlo, Monaco; ATP 1000; Clay, outdoor 13 – 19 April 2009	–	1R	Bye			
Monte Carlo Rolex Masters; Monte Carlo, Monaco; ATP 1000; Clay, outdoor 13 – 19 April 2009	28 / 440	2R	(Argentina) Juan Ignacio Chela (PR)	167	Win	6–2, 6–3
Monte Carlo Rolex Masters; Monte Carlo, Monaco; ATP 1000; Clay, outdoor 13 – 19 April 2009	29 / 441	3R	(Ecuador) Nicolás Lapentti (Q)	98	Win	6–3, 6–0
Monte Carlo Rolex Masters; Monte Carlo, Monaco; ATP 1000; Clay, outdoor 13 – 19 April 2009	30 / 442	QF	(Croatia) Ivan Ljubičić (WC)	66	Win	6–3, 6–3
Monte Carlo Rolex Masters; Monte Carlo, Monaco; ATP 1000; Clay, outdoor 13 – 19 April 2009	31 / 443	SF	(United Kingdom) Andy Murray (4)	4	Win	6–2, 7–6^{(7–4)}
Monte Carlo Rolex Masters; Monte Carlo, Monaco; ATP 1000; Clay, outdoor 13 – 19 April 2009	32 / 444	W	(Serbia) Novak Djokovic (3)	3	Win (3)	6–3, 2–6, 6–1
Barcelona Open Banco Sabadell; Barcelona, Spain; ATP 500; Clay, outdoor 20 – 26 April 2009
Barcelona Open Banco Sabadell; Barcelona, Spain; ATP 500; Clay, outdoor 20 – 26 April 2009	–	1R	Bye			
Barcelona Open Banco Sabadell; Barcelona, Spain; ATP 500; Clay, outdoor 20 – 26 April 2009	33 / 445	2R	(Portugal) Frederico Gil (Q)	75	Win	6–2, 6–2
Barcelona Open Banco Sabadell; Barcelona, Spain; ATP 500; Clay, outdoor 20 – 26 April 2009	34 / 446	3R	(Belgium) Christophe Rochus	61	Win	6–2, 6–0
Barcelona Open Banco Sabadell; Barcelona, Spain; ATP 500; Clay, outdoor 20 – 26 April 2009	–	QF	(Argentina) David Nalbandian (7)	15	Walkover	N/A
Barcelona Open Banco Sabadell; Barcelona, Spain; ATP 500; Clay, outdoor 20 – 26 April 2009	35 / 447	SF	(Russia) Nikolay Davydenko (3)	8	Win	6–3, 6–2
Barcelona Open Banco Sabadell; Barcelona, Spain; ATP 500; Clay, outdoor 20 – 26 April 2009	36 / 448	W	(Spain) David Ferrer (4)	13	Win (4)	6–2, 7–5
Internazionali BNL d'Italia; Rome, Italy; ATP 1000; Clay, outdoor 27 April – 3 May 2009
Internazionali BNL d'Italia; Rome, Italy; ATP 1000; Clay, outdoor 27 April – 3 May 2009	–	1R	Bye			
Internazionali BNL d'Italia; Rome, Italy; ATP 1000; Clay, outdoor 27 April – 3 May 2009	37 / 449	2R	(Italy) Andreas Seppi	37	Win	6–2, 6–3
Internazionali BNL d'Italia; Rome, Italy; ATP 1000; Clay, outdoor 27 April – 3 May 2009	38 / 450	3R	(Sweden) Robin Söderling	27	Win	6–1, 6–0
Internazionali BNL d'Italia; Rome, Italy; ATP 1000; Clay, outdoor 27 April – 3 May 2009	39 / 451	QF	(Spain) Fernando Verdasco (6)	8	Win	6–3, 6–3
Internazionali BNL d'Italia; Rome, Italy; ATP 1000; Clay, outdoor 27 April – 3 May 2009	40 / 452	SF	(Chile) Fernando González (12)	13	Win	6–3, 6–3
Internazionali BNL d'Italia; Rome, Italy; ATP 1000; Clay, outdoor 27 April – 3 May 2009	41 / 453	W	(Serbia) Novak Djokovic (3)	3	Win (5)	7–6^{(7–2)}, 6–2
Mutua Madrileña Madrid Open; Madrid, Spain; ATP 1000; Clay, outdoor 11 – 17 May 2009
Mutua Madrileña Madrid Open; Madrid, Spain; ATP 1000; Clay, outdoor 11 – 17 May 2009	–	1R	Bye			
Mutua Madrileña Madrid Open; Madrid, Spain; ATP 1000; Clay, outdoor 11 – 17 May 2009	42 / 454	2R	(Austria) Jürgen Melzer	27	Win	6–3, 6–1
Mutua Madrileña Madrid Open; Madrid, Spain; ATP 1000; Clay, outdoor 11 – 17 May 2009	–	3R	(Germany) Philipp Kohlschreiber	35	Walkover	N/A
Mutua Madrileña Madrid Open; Madrid, Spain; ATP 1000; Clay, outdoor 11 – 17 May 2009	43 / 455	QF	(Spain) Fernando Verdasco (7)	8	Win	6–4, 7–5
Mutua Madrileña Madrid Open; Madrid, Spain; ATP 1000; Clay, outdoor 11 – 17 May 2009	44 / 456	SF	(Serbia) Novak Djokovic (3)	4	Win	3–6, 7–6^{(7–5)}, 7–6^{(11–9)}
Mutua Madrileña Madrid Open; Madrid, Spain; ATP 1000; Clay, outdoor 11 – 17 May 2009	45 / 457	F	(Switzerland) Roger Federer (2)	2	Loss (2)	4–6, 4–6
French Open; Paris, France; Grand Slam tournament Clay, outdoor 25 May – 7 June 2009
French Open; Paris, France; Grand Slam tournament Clay, outdoor 25 May – 7 June 2009	46 / 458	1R	(Brazil) Marcos Daniel (Q)	97	Win	7–5, 6–4, 6–3
French Open; Paris, France; Grand Slam tournament Clay, outdoor 25 May – 7 June 2009	47 / 459	2R	(Russia) Teymuraz Gabashvili	72	Win	6–1, 6–4, 6–2
French Open; Paris, France; Grand Slam tournament Clay, outdoor 25 May – 7 June 2009	48 / 460	3R	(Australia) Lleyton Hewitt	48	Win	6–1, 6–3, 6–1
French Open; Paris, France; Grand Slam tournament Clay, outdoor 25 May – 7 June 2009	49 / 461	4R	(Sweden) Robin Söderling (23)	25	Loss	2–6, 7–6^{(7–2)}, 4–6, 6–7^{(2–7)}
Rogers Cup; Montreal, Canada; ATP 1000; Hard, outdoor 10 – 16 August 2009
Rogers Cup; Montreal, Canada; ATP 1000; Hard, outdoor 10 – 16 August 2009	–	1R	Bye			
Rogers Cup; Montreal, Canada; ATP 1000; Hard, outdoor 10 – 16 August 2009	50 / 462	2R	(Spain) David Ferrer	19	Win	4–3, retired
Rogers Cup; Montreal, Canada; ATP 1000; Hard, outdoor 10 – 16 August 2009	51 / 463	3R	(Germany) Philipp Petzschner	45	Win	6–3, 6–2
Rogers Cup; Montreal, Canada; ATP 1000; Hard, outdoor 10 – 16 August 2009	52 / 464	QF	(Argentina) Juan Martín del Potro (6)	6	Loss	6–7^{(5–7)}, 1–6
W&S Financial Group Masters; Cincinnati, United States; ATP 1000; Hard, outdoor 17 – 23 August 2009
W&S Financial Group Masters; Cincinnati, United States; ATP 1000; Hard, outdoor 17 – 23 August 2009	–	1R	Bye			
W&S Financial Group Masters; Cincinnati, United States; ATP 1000; Hard, outdoor 17 – 23 August 2009	53 / 465	2R	(Italy) Andreas Seppi	45	Win	7–6^{(7–4)}, 7–6^{(7–3)}
W&S Financial Group Masters; Cincinnati, United States; ATP 1000; Hard, outdoor 17 – 23 August 2009	54 / 466	3R	(France) Paul-Henri Mathieu	31	Win	7–5, 6–2
W&S Financial Group Masters; Cincinnati, United States; ATP 1000; Hard, outdoor 17 – 23 August 2009	55 / 467	QF	(Czech Republic) Tomáš Berdych	18	Win	6–4, 7–5
W&S Financial Group Masters; Cincinnati, United States; ATP 1000; Hard, outdoor 17 – 23 August 2009	56 / 468	SF	(Serbia) Novak Djokovic (4)	4	Loss	1–6, 4–6
US Open; New York City, United States; Grand Slam tournament Hard, outdoor 31 August – 13 September 2009
US Open; New York City, United States; Grand Slam tournament Hard, outdoor 31 August – 13 September 2009	57 / 469	1R	(France) Richard Gasquet	46	Win	6–2, 6–2, 6–3
US Open; New York City, United States; Grand Slam tournament Hard, outdoor 31 August – 13 September 2009	58 / 470	2R	(Germany) Nicolas Kiefer	129	Win	6–0, 3–6, 6–3, 6–4
US Open; New York City, United States; Grand Slam tournament Hard, outdoor 31 August – 13 September 2009	59 / 471	3R	(Spain) Nicolás Almagro (32)	33	Win	7–5, 6–4, 6–4
US Open; New York City, United States; Grand Slam tournament Hard, outdoor 31 August – 13 September 2009	60 / 472	4R	(France) Gaël Monfils (13)	13	Win	6–7^{(3–7)}, 6–3, 6–1, 6–3
US Open; New York City, United States; Grand Slam tournament Hard, outdoor 31 August – 13 September 2009	61 / 473	QF	(Chile) Fernando González (11)	11	Win	7–6^{(7–4)}, 7–6^{(7–2)}, 6–0
US Open; New York City, United States; Grand Slam tournament Hard, outdoor 31 August – 13 September 2009	62 / 474	SF	(Argentina) Juan Martín del Potro (6)	6	Loss	2–6, 2–6, 2–6
China Open; Beijing, China; ATP 500; Hard, outdoor 5 – 11 October 2009
China Open; Beijing, China; ATP 500; Hard, outdoor 5 – 11 October 2009	63 / 475	1R	(Cyprus) Marcos Baghdatis (WC)	90	Win	6–4, 3–6, 6–4
China Open; Beijing, China; ATP 500; Hard, outdoor 5 – 11 October 2009	64 / 476	2R	(United States) James Blake	24	Win	7–5, 6–7^{(4–7)}, 6–3
China Open; Beijing, China; ATP 500; Hard, outdoor 5 – 11 October 2009	65 / 477	QF	(Russia) Marat Safin (WC)	59	Win	6–3, 6–1
China Open; Beijing, China; ATP 500; Hard, outdoor 5 – 11 October 2009	66 / 478	SF	(Croatia) Marin Čilić (8/WC)	15	Loss	1–6, 3–6
Shanghai ATP Masters 1000; Shanghai, China; ATP 1000; Hard, outdoor 12 – 18 October 2009
Shanghai ATP Masters 1000; Shanghai, China; ATP 1000; Hard, outdoor 12 – 18 October 2009	–	1R	Bye			
Shanghai ATP Masters 1000; Shanghai, China; ATP 1000; Hard, outdoor 12 – 18 October 2009	67 / 479	2R	(United States) James Blake	26	Win	6–2, 6–7^{(4–7)}, 6–4
Shanghai ATP Masters 1000; Shanghai, China; ATP 1000; Hard, outdoor 12 – 18 October 2009	68 / 480	3R	(Spain) Tommy Robredo (14)	15	Win	6–1, 6–4
Shanghai ATP Masters 1000; Shanghai, China; ATP 1000; Hard, outdoor 12 – 18 October 2009	69 / 481	QF	(Croatia) Ivan Ljubičić	37	Win	3–6, 6–3, retired
Shanghai ATP Masters 1000; Shanghai, China; ATP 1000; Hard, outdoor 12 – 18 October 2009	70 / 482	SF	(Spain) Feliciano López	41	Win	6–1, 3–0, retired
Shanghai ATP Masters 1000; Shanghai, China; ATP 1000; Hard, outdoor 12 – 18 October 2009	71 / 483	F	(Russia) Nikolay Davydenko (6)	8	Loss (3)	6–7^{(3–7)}, 3–6
BNP Paribas Masters; Paris, France; ATP 1000; Hard, indoor 9 – 15 November 2009
BNP Paribas Masters; Paris, France; ATP 1000; Hard, indoor 9 – 15 November 2009	–	1R	Bye			
BNP Paribas Masters; Paris, France; ATP 1000; Hard, indoor 9 – 15 November 2009	72 / 484	2R	(Spain) Nicolás Almagro	27	Win	3–6, 7–6^{(7–2)}, 7–5
BNP Paribas Masters; Paris, France; ATP 1000; Hard, indoor 9 – 15 November 2009	73 / 485	3R	(Spain) Tommy Robredo (14)	15	Win	6–3, 3–6, 7–5
BNP Paribas Masters; Paris, France; ATP 1000; Hard, indoor 9 – 15 November 2009	74 / 486	QF	(France) Jo-Wilfried Tsonga (8)	9	Win	7–5, 7–5
BNP Paribas Masters; Paris, France; ATP 1000; Hard, indoor 9 – 15 November 2009	75 / 487	SF	(Serbia) Novak Djokovic (3)	3	Loss	2–6, 3–6
Barclays ATP World Tour Finals; London, United Kingdom; ATP Finals; Hard, indoor 22 – 29 November 2009
Barclays ATP World Tour Finals; London, United Kingdom; ATP Finals; Hard, indoor 22 – 29 November 2009	76 / 488	RR	(Sweden) Robin Söderling (8)	9	Loss	4–6, 4–6
Barclays ATP World Tour Finals; London, United Kingdom; ATP Finals; Hard, indoor 22 – 29 November 2009	77 / 489	RR	(Russia) Nikolay Davydenko (6)	7	Loss	1–6, 6–7^{(4–7)}
Barclays ATP World Tour Finals; London, United Kingdom; ATP Finals; Hard, indoor 22 – 29 November 2009	78 / 490	RR	(Serbia) Novak Djokovic (3)	3	Loss	6–7^{(5–7)}, 3–6
Davis Cup, World Group Final; Barcelona, Spain; Davis Cup; Clay, indoor 4 – 6 December 2009
Davis Cup, World Group Final; Barcelona, Spain; Davis Cup; Clay, indoor 4 – 6 December 2009	79 / 491	W R1	(Czech Republic) Tomáš Berdych	20	Win	7–5, 6–0, 6–2
Davis Cup, World Group Final; Barcelona, Spain; Davis Cup; Clay, indoor 4 – 6 December 2009	80 / 492	W R4	(Czech Republic) Jan Hájek	102	Win	6–3, 6–4

Source (ATP)

=== Exhibition matches ===
Tournament	Round	Opponent	Result	Score
Capitala World Tennis Championship; Abu Dhabi, United Arab Emirates; Exhibition tournament Hard, outdoor 1 – 3 January 2009	QF	Bye		
Capitala World Tennis Championship; Abu Dhabi, United Arab Emirates; Exhibition tournament Hard, outdoor 1 – 3 January 2009	SF	(Russia) Nikolay Davydenko	Win	6–2, 6–3
Capitala World Tennis Championship; Abu Dhabi, United Arab Emirates; Exhibition tournament Hard, outdoor 1 – 3 January 2009	F	(United Kingdom) Andy Murray	Loss	4–6, 7–5, 3–6
Masters Guinot-Mary Cohr; Paris, France; Exhibition tournament Clay, outdoor 20 – 22 May 2009	W R4	(France) Arnaud Clément	Win	6–3, 6–3

=== Doubles ===
Tournament	Match	Round	Opponents (seed or key)	Ranks	Result	Score
Qatar ExxonMobil Open; Doha, Qatar; ATP 250; Hard, outdoor 5 – 11 January 2009; Partner: (Spain) Marc López
Qatar ExxonMobil Open; Doha, Qatar; ATP 250; Hard, outdoor 5 – 11 January 2009; Partner: (Spain) Marc López	1 / 115	1R	(Spain) Óscar Hernández / (Spain) Albert Montañés	#136 / #99	Win	6–3, 6–3
Qatar ExxonMobil Open; Doha, Qatar; ATP 250; Hard, outdoor 5 – 11 January 2009; Partner: (Spain) Marc López	2 / 116	QF	(Germany) Christopher Kas / (Germany) Philipp Kohlschreiber (4)	#29 / #79	Win	6–7^{(7–9)}, 6–4, [10–3]
Qatar ExxonMobil Open; Doha, Qatar; ATP 250; Hard, outdoor 5 – 11 January 2009; Partner: (Spain) Marc López	3 / 117	SF	(France) Fabrice Santoro / (Russia) Mikhail Youzhny	#75 / #63	Win	1–6, 7–6^{(7–2)}, [11–9]
Qatar ExxonMobil Open; Doha, Qatar; ATP 250; Hard, outdoor 5 – 11 January 2009; Partner: (Spain) Marc López	4 / 118	W	(Canada) Daniel Nestor / (Serbia) Nenad Zimonjić (1)	#2 / #1	Win (1)	4–6, 6–4, [10–8]
ABN AMRO World Tennis Tournament; Rotterdam, Netherlands; ATP 500; Hard, indoor 9 – 15 February 2009; Partner: (Spain) Ignacio Coll-Riudavets
ABN AMRO World Tennis Tournament; Rotterdam, Netherlands; ATP 500; Hard, indoor 9 – 15 February 2009; Partner: (Spain) Ignacio Coll-Riudavets	5 / 119	1R	(France) Arnaud Clément / (France) Michaël Llodra	#83 / #39	Loss	3–6, 4–6
BNP Paribas Open; Indian Wells, United States; ATP 1000; Hard, outdoor 9 – 22 March 2009; Partner: (Spain) Marc López
BNP Paribas Open; Indian Wells, United States; ATP 1000; Hard, outdoor 9 – 22 March 2009; Partner: (Spain) Marc López	6 / 120	1R	(Czech Republic) František Čermák / (Slovakia) Michal Mertiňák	#26 / #31	Win	7–6^{(7–2)}, 4–6, [10–7]
BNP Paribas Open; Indian Wells, United States; ATP 1000; Hard, outdoor 9 – 22 March 2009; Partner: (Spain) Marc López	7 / 121	2R	(United States) Bob Bryan / (United States) Mike Bryan (1)	#1 / #1	Loss	4–6, 3–6
Sony Ericsson Open; Miami, United States; ATP 1000; Hard, outdoor 23 March – 5 April 2009; Partner: (Spain) Marc López
Sony Ericsson Open; Miami, United States; ATP 1000; Hard, outdoor 23 March – 5 April 2009; Partner: (Spain) Marc López	8 / 122	1R	(Sweden) Johan Brunström / (Netherlands Antilles) Jean-Julien Rojer (Alt)	#61 / #69	Win	6–2, 7–6^{(7–5)}
Sony Ericsson Open; Miami, United States; ATP 1000; Hard, outdoor 23 March – 5 April 2009; Partner: (Spain) Marc López	9 / 123	2R	(Brazil) Bruno Soares / (Zimbabwe) Kevin Ullyett (6)	#20 / #6	Loss	3–6, 4–6
Rogers Cup; Montreal, Canada; ATP 1000; Hard, outdoor 10 – 16 August 2009; Partner: (Spain) Francisco Roig
Rogers Cup; Montreal, Canada; ATP 1000; Hard, outdoor 10 – 16 August 2009; Partner: (Spain) Francisco Roig	10 / 124	1R	(Serbia) Novak Djokovic / (Serbia) Dušan Vemić	#140 / #49	Win	7–5, 6–4
Rogers Cup; Montreal, Canada; ATP 1000; Hard, outdoor 10 – 16 August 2009; Partner: (Spain) Francisco Roig	11 / 125	2R	(Belarus) Max Mirnyi / (Israel) Andy Ram (7)	#21 / #12	Loss	6–4, 3–6, [8–10]
BNP Paribas Masters; Paris, France; ATP 1000; Hard, indoor 9 – 15 November 2009; Partner: (Argentina) Juan Mónaco
BNP Paribas Masters; Paris, France; ATP 1000; Hard, indoor 9 – 15 November 2009; Partner: (Argentina) Juan Mónaco	12 / 126	1R	(Germany) Christopher Kas / (Germany) Philipp Kohlschreiber	#39 / #88	Loss	6–4, 5–7, [13–15]

Source (ATP)

== See also ==
- 2009 ATP World Tour
- 2009 Roger Federer tennis season
- 2009 Novak Djokovic tennis season
- 2009 Juan Martín del Potro tennis season
