= 2009 Juan Martín del Potro tennis season =

- Full name: Juan Martín del Potro
- Country: Argentina
- Calendar prize money: $4,712,744

Singles
- Season record: 54–16
- Calendar titles: 3
- Year-end ranking: No. 5
- Ranking change from previous year: ▼1

Grand Slam & significant results
- Australian Open: QF
- French Open: SF
- Wimbledon: 2R
- US Open: W

Doubles
- Season record: 0–0
- Calendar titles: 0
- Current ranking: 588
- Ranking change from previous year: ▼171

The 2009 Juan Martín del Potro tennis season officially began at the Auckland Open, where he had won his first title at Auckland.

== All matches ==
Key
W	F	SF	QF	#R	RR	Q#	P#	DNQ	A	Z#	PO	G	S	B	NMS	NTI	P	NH

(W) winner; (F) finalist; (SF) semifinalist; (QF) quarterfinalist; (#R) rounds 4, 3, 2, 1; (RR) round-robin stage; (Q#) qualification round; (P#) preliminary round; (DNQ) did not qualify; (A) absent; (Z#) Davis/Fed Cup Zonal Group (with number indication) or (PO) play-off; (G) gold, (S) silver or (B) bronze Olympic/Paralympic medal; (NMS) not a Masters tournament; (NTI) not a Tier I tournament; (P) postponed; (NH) not held; (SR) strike rate (events won / competed); (W–L) win–loss record.
To avoid confusion and double counting, these charts are updated at the conclusion of a tournament or when the player's participation has ended.

=== Singles matches ===
Tournament	Match	Round	Opponent (seed or key)	Rank	Result	Score
Auckland Open; Auckland, New Zealand; ATP 250; Hard, outdoor 12 – 17 January 2009
Auckland Open; Auckland, New Zealand; ATP 250; Hard, outdoor 12 – 17 January 2009	–	1R	Bye			
Auckland Open; Auckland, New Zealand; ATP 250; Hard, outdoor 12 – 17 January 2009	1 / 127	2R	(Latvia) Ernests Gulbis	51	Win	4–6, 6–4, 6–1
Auckland Open; Auckland, New Zealand; ATP 250; Hard, outdoor 12 – 17 January 2009	2 / 128	QF	(Serbia) Viktor Troicki	53	Win	6–3, 6–2
Auckland Open; Auckland, New Zealand; ATP 250; Hard, outdoor 12 – 17 January 2009	3 / 129	SF	(Sweden) Robin Söderling (3)	17	Win	6–4, 6–3
Auckland Open; Auckland, New Zealand; ATP 250; Hard, outdoor 12 – 17 January 2009	4 / 130	W	(United States) Sam Querrey (6)	36	Win (1)	6–4, 6–4
Australian Open; Melbourne, Australia; Grand Slam tournament Hard, outdoor 19 January – 1 February 2009
Australian Open; Melbourne, Australia; Grand Slam tournament Hard, outdoor 19 January – 1 February 2009	5 / 131	1R	(Germany) Mischa Zverev	81	Win	6–3, 6–4, 6–2
Australian Open; Melbourne, Australia; Grand Slam tournament Hard, outdoor 19 January – 1 February 2009	6 / 132	2R	(Germany) Florian Mayer (Q)	450	Win	6–1, 7–5, 6–2
Australian Open; Melbourne, Australia; Grand Slam tournament Hard, outdoor 19 January – 1 February 2009	7 / 133	3R	(Luxembourg) Gilles Müller	87	Win	6–7^{(5–7)}, 7–5, 6–3, 7–5
Australian Open; Melbourne, Australia; Grand Slam tournament Hard, outdoor 19 January – 1 February 2009	8 / 134	4R	(Croatia) Marin Čilić (19)	20	Win	5–7, 6–4, 6–4, 6–3
Australian Open; Melbourne, Australia; Grand Slam tournament Hard, outdoor 19 January – 1 February 2009	9 / 135	QF	(Switzerland) Roger Federer (2)	2	Loss	3–6, 0–6, 0–6
Pacific Coast Championships; San Jose, United States; ATP 250; Hard, outdoor 9 – 15 February 2009
Pacific Coast Championships; San Jose, United States; ATP 250; Hard, outdoor 9 – 15 February 2009	10 / 136	1R	(Italy) Andrea Stoppini (Q)	209	Win	7–6^{(7–5)}, 7–6^{(7–5)}
Pacific Coast Championships; San Jose, United States; ATP 250; Hard, outdoor 9 – 15 February 2009	11 / 137	2R	(Japan) Kei Nishikori	56	Win	6–2, 6–2
Pacific Coast Championships; San Jose, United States; ATP 250; Hard, outdoor 9 – 15 February 2009	12 / 138	QF	(United States) Mardy Fish (5)	24	Loss	3–6, 4–6
Memphis Open; Memphis, United States; ATP 500; Hard, outdoor 15 – 22 February 2009
Memphis Open; Memphis, United States; ATP 500; Hard, outdoor 15 – 22 February 2009	13 / 139	1R	(Argentina) Guillermo Cañas	69	Win	6–3, 7–6^{(7–5)}
Memphis Open; Memphis, United States; ATP 500; Hard, outdoor 15 – 22 February 2009	14 / 140	2R	(Latvia) Ernests Gulbis	42	Win	6–3, 6–4
Memphis Open; Memphis, United States; ATP 500; Hard, outdoor 15 – 22 February 2009	15 / 141	QF	(Czech Republic) Radek Štěpánek (5)	19	Loss	6–7^{(7–9)}, 4–6
Indian Wells Masters; Indian Wells, United States; ATP 1000; Hard, outdoor 9 – 22 March 2009
Indian Wells Masters; Indian Wells, United States; ATP 1000; Hard, outdoor 9 – 22 March 2009	–	1R	Bye			
Indian Wells Masters; Indian Wells, United States; ATP 1000; Hard, outdoor 9 – 22 March 2009	16 / 142	2R	(United States) Ryan Sweeting (WC)	170	Win	6–7^{(6–8)}, 6–3, 6–1
Indian Wells Masters; Indian Wells, United States; ATP 1000; Hard, outdoor 9 – 22 March 2009	17 / 143	3R	(Austria) Jürgen Melzer (30)	31	Win	6–2, 2–6, 7–6^{(7–2)}
Indian Wells Masters; Indian Wells, United States; ATP 1000; Hard, outdoor 9 – 22 March 2009	18 / 144	4R	(United States) John Isner (WC)	147	Win	7–6^{(7–4)}, 7–6^{(7–3)}
Indian Wells Masters; Indian Wells, United States; ATP 1000; Hard, outdoor 9 – 22 March 2009	19 / 145	QF	(Spain) Rafael Nadal (1)	1	Loss	2–6, 4–6
Miami Open; Miami, United States; ATP 1000; Hard, outdoor 23 March – 5 April 2009
Miami Open; Miami, United States; ATP 1000; Hard, outdoor 23 March – 5 April 2009	–	1R	Bye			
Miami Open; Miami, United States; ATP 1000; Hard, outdoor 23 March – 5 April 2009	20 / 146	2R	(Argentina) Martín Vassallo Argüello	52	Win	6–2, 6–2
Miami Open; Miami, United States; ATP 1000; Hard, outdoor 23 March – 5 April 2009	21 / 147	3R	(Serbia) Janko Tipsarević	46	Win	6–4, 6–1
Miami Open; Miami, United States; ATP 1000; Hard, outdoor 23 March – 5 April 2009	22 / 148	4R	(Spain) David Ferrer (11)	12	Win	6–3, 6–2
Miami Open; Miami, United States; ATP 1000; Hard, outdoor 23 March – 5 April 2009	23 / 149	QF	(Spain) Rafael Nadal (1)	1	Win	6–4, 3–6, 7–6^{(7–3)}
Miami Open; Miami, United States; ATP 1000; Hard, outdoor 23 March – 5 April 2009	24 / 150	SF	(United Kingdom) Andy Murray (4)	4	Loss	1–6, 7–5, 2–6
Monte-Carlo Masters; Monte Carlo, Monaco; ATP 1000; Clay, outdoor 13 – 19 April 2009
Monte-Carlo Masters; Monte Carlo, Monaco; ATP 1000; Clay, outdoor 13 – 19 April 2009	–	1R	Bye			
Monte-Carlo Masters; Monte Carlo, Monaco; ATP 1000; Clay, outdoor 13 – 19 April 2009	25 / 151	2R	(Croatia) Ivan Ljubičić (WC)	66	Loss	6–4, 1–6, 4–6
Italian Open; Rome, Italy; ATP 1000; Clay, outdoor 27 April – 3 May 2009
Italian Open; Rome, Italy; ATP 1000; Clay, outdoor 27 April – 3 May 2009	–	1R	Bye			
Italian Open; Rome, Italy; ATP 1000; Clay, outdoor 27 April – 3 May 2009	26 / 152	2R	(Serbia) Viktor Troicki	40	Win	6–3, 1–6, 6–3
Italian Open; Rome, Italy; ATP 1000; Clay, outdoor 27 April – 3 May 2009	27 / 153	3R	(Switzerland) Stan Wawrinka (10)	12	Win	6–2, 6–7^{(5–7)}, 6–3
Italian Open; Rome, Italy; ATP 1000; Clay, outdoor 27 April – 3 May 2009	28 / 154	QF	(Serbia) Novak Djokovic (3)	3	Loss	3–6, 4–6
Madrid Open; Madrid, Spain; ATP 1000; Clay, outdoor 11 – 17 May 2009
Madrid Open; Madrid, Spain; ATP 1000; Clay, outdoor 11 – 17 May 2009	–	1R	Bye			
Madrid Open; Madrid, Spain; ATP 1000; Clay, outdoor 11 – 17 May 2009	29 / 155	2R	(Czech Republic) Tomáš Berdych	22	Win	6–2, 4–1 Ret.
Madrid Open; Madrid, Spain; ATP 1000; Clay, outdoor 11 – 17 May 2009	30 / 156	3R	(Switzerland) Stan Wawrinka (11)	18	Win	4–6, 6–4, 6–4
Madrid Open; Madrid, Spain; ATP 1000; Clay, outdoor 11 – 17 May 2009	31 / 157	QF	(United Kingdom) Andy Murray (4)	3	Win	7–6^{(7–4)}, 6–3
Madrid Open; Madrid, Spain; ATP 1000; Clay, outdoor 11 – 17 May 2009	32 / 158	SF	(Switzerland) Roger Federer (2)	2	Loss	3–6, 4–6
World Team Cup; Düsseldorf, Germany; ATP 250; Clay, outdoor 17 – 23 May 2009
World Team Cup; Düsseldorf, Germany; ATP 250; Clay, outdoor 17 – 23 May 2009	33 / 159	RR	(Italy) Andreas Seppi	54	Win	6–3, 6–4
World Team Cup; Düsseldorf, Germany; ATP 250; Clay, outdoor 17 – 23 May 2009	34 / 160	RR	(Russia) Igor Andreev	27	Win	6–3, 7–6^{(7–3)}
French Open; Paris, France; Grand Slam tournament Clay, outdoor 25 May – 7 June 2009
French Open; Paris, France; Grand Slam tournament Clay, outdoor 25 May – 7 June 2009	35 / 161	1R	(France) Michaël Llodra	78	Win	6–3, 6–3, 6–1
French Open; Paris, France; Grand Slam tournament Clay, outdoor 25 May – 7 June 2009	36 / 162	2R	(Serbia) Viktor Troicki	32	Win	6–3, 7–5, 6–0
French Open; Paris, France; Grand Slam tournament Clay, outdoor 25 May – 7 June 2009	37 / 163	3R	(Russia) Igor Andreev (25)	27	Win	6–4, 7–5, 6–4
French Open; Paris, France; Grand Slam tournament Clay, outdoor 25 May – 7 June 2009	38 / 164	4R	(France) Jo-Wilfried Tsonga (9)	9	Win	6–1, 6–7^{(5–7)}, 6–1, 6–4
French Open; Paris, France; Grand Slam tournament Clay, outdoor 25 May – 7 June 2009	39 / 165	QF	(Spain) Tommy Robredo (16)	17	Win	6–3, 6–4, 6–2
French Open; Paris, France; Grand Slam tournament Clay, outdoor 25 May – 7 June 2009	40 / 166	SF	(Switzerland) Roger Federer (2)	2	Loss	6–3, 6–7^{(2–7)}, 6–2, 1–6, 4–6
Wimbledon; London, United Kingdom; Grand Slam tournament Grass, outdoor 22 June – 5 July 2009
Wimbledon; London, United Kingdom; Grand Slam tournament Grass, outdoor 22 June – 5 July 2009	41 / 167	1R	(France) Arnaud Clément	53	Win	6–3, 6–1, 6–2
Wimbledon; London, United Kingdom; Grand Slam tournament Grass, outdoor 22 June – 5 July 2009	42 / 168	2R	(Australia) Lleyton Hewitt	56	Loss	3–6, 5–7, 5–7
Davis Cup, World Group Quarter Finals; Ostrava, Czech Republic; Davis Cup; Clay, outdoor 6 – 8 March 2009
Davis Cup, World Group Quarter Finals; Ostrava, Czech Republic; Davis Cup; Clay, outdoor 6 – 8 March 2009	43 / 169	QF; R2	(Czech Republic) Ivo Minář	64	Win	6–1, 6–3, 6–3
Davis Cup, World Group Quarter Finals; Ostrava, Czech Republic; Davis Cup; Clay, outdoor 6 – 8 March 2009	44 / 170	QF; R4	(Czech Republic) Tomáš Berdych	20	Win	6–4, 6–4, 6–4
Washington Open; Washington, D.C., United States; ATP 500; Hard, outdoor 1 – 9 August 2009
Washington Open; Washington, D.C., United States; ATP 500; Hard, outdoor 1 – 9 August 2009	–	1R	Bye			
Washington Open; Washington, D.C., United States; ATP 500; Hard, outdoor 1 – 9 August 2009	45 / 171	2R	(Chinese Taipei) Sergiy Stakhovsky	62	Win	4–6, 6–3, 6–2
Washington Open; Washington, D.C., United States; ATP 500; Hard, outdoor 1 – 9 August 2009	46 / 172	3R	(Australia) Lleyton Hewitt (Q)	42	Win	4–6, 6–3, 7–6^{(7–2)}
Washington Open; Washington, D.C., United States; ATP 500; Hard, outdoor 1 – 9 August 2009	-	QF	(Sweden) Robin Söderling (5)	12	Win	W/O
Washington Open; Washington, D.C., United States; ATP 500; Hard, outdoor 1 – 9 August 2009	47 / 173	SF	(Chile) Fernando González (4)	11	Win	7–6^{(7–2)}, 6–3
Washington Open; Washington, D.C., United States; ATP 500; Hard, outdoor 1 – 9 August 2009	48 / 174	W	(United States) Andy Roddick (1)	5	Win (2)	3–6, 7–5, 7–6^{(8–6)}
Canadian Open; Montreal, Canada; ATP 1000; Hard, outdoor 10 – 16 August 2009
Canadian Open; Montreal, Canada; ATP 1000; Hard, outdoor 10 – 16 August 2009	–	1R	Bye			
Canadian Open; Montreal, Canada; ATP 1000; Hard, outdoor 10 – 16 August 2009	49 / 175	2R	(Czech Republic) Jan Hernych (Q)	86	Win	6–2, 7–5
Canadian Open; Montreal, Canada; ATP 1000; Hard, outdoor 10 – 16 August 2009	50 / 176	3R	(Romania) Victor Hănescu	32	Win	3–6, 6–3, 6–4
Canadian Open; Montreal, Canada; ATP 1000; Hard, outdoor 10 – 16 August 2009	51 / 177	QF	(Spain) Rafael Nadal (2)	2	Win	7–6^{(7–5)}, 6–1
Canadian Open; Montreal, Canada; ATP 1000; Hard, outdoor 10 – 16 August 2009	52 / 178	SF	(United States) Andy Roddick (5)	5	Win	4–6, 6–2, 7–5
Canadian Open; Montreal, Canada; ATP 1000; Hard, outdoor 10 – 16 August 2009	53 / 179	F	(United Kingdom) Andy Murray (3)	3	Loss (1)	7–6^{(7–4)}, 6–7^{(3–7)}, 1–6
US Open; New York City, United States; Grand Slam tournament Hard, outdoor 31 August – 13 September 2009
US Open; New York City, United States; Grand Slam tournament Hard, outdoor 31 August – 13 September 2009	54 / 180	1R	(Argentina) Juan Mónaco	41	Win	6–3, 6–3, 6–1
US Open; New York City, United States; Grand Slam tournament Hard, outdoor 31 August – 13 September 2009	55 / 181	2R	(Austria) Jürgen Melzer	38	Win	7–6^{(8–6)}, 6–3, 6–3
US Open; New York City, United States; Grand Slam tournament Hard, outdoor 31 August – 13 September 2009	56 / 182	3R	(Austria) Daniel Köllerer	62	Win	6–1, 3–6, 6–3, 6–3
US Open; New York City, United States; Grand Slam tournament Hard, outdoor 31 August – 13 September 2009	57 / 183	4R	(Spain) Juan Carlos Ferrero (24)	25	Win	6–3, 6–3, 6–3
US Open; New York City, United States; Grand Slam tournament Hard, outdoor 31 August – 13 September 2009	58 / 184	QF	(Croatia) Marin Čilić (16)	17	Win	4–6, 6–3, 6–2, 6–1
US Open; New York City, United States; Grand Slam tournament Hard, outdoor 31 August – 13 September 2009	59 / 185	SF	(Spain) Rafael Nadal (3)	3	Win	6–2, 6–2, 6–2
US Open; New York City, United States; Grand Slam tournament Hard, outdoor 31 August – 13 September 2009	60 / 186	W	(Switzerland) Roger Federer (1)	1	Win (3)	3–6, 7–6^{(7–5)}, 4–6, 7–6^{(7–4)}, 6–2
Japan Open; Tokyo, Japan; ATP 500; Hard, outdoor 5 – 11 October 2009
Japan Open; Tokyo, Japan; ATP 500; Hard, outdoor 5 – 11 October 2009	61 / 187	1R	(France) Édouard Roger-Vasselin (Q)	189	Loss	4–6, 4–6
Shanghai Masters; Shanghai, China; ATP 1000; Hard, outdoor 12 – 18 October 2009
Shanghai Masters; Shanghai, China; ATP 1000; Hard, outdoor 12 – 18 October 2009	–	1R	Bye			
Shanghai Masters; Shanghai, China; ATP 1000; Hard, outdoor 12 – 18 October 2009	62 / 187	2R	(Austria) Jürgen Melzer (6)	43	Loss	5–7, 1–2, Ret.
Paris Open; Paris, France; ATP 1000; Hard, indoor 9 – 15 November 2009
Paris Open; Paris, France; ATP 1000; Hard, indoor 9 – 15 November 2009	–	1R	Bye			
Paris Open; Paris, France; ATP 1000; Hard, indoor 9 – 15 November 2009	63 / 188	2R	(Russia) Marat Safin (WC)	65	Win	6–4, 5–7, 6–4
Paris Open; Paris, France; ATP 1000; Hard, indoor 9 – 15 November 2009	64 / 189	3R	(Chile) Fernando González (10)	11	Win	6–7^{(6–8)}, 7–6^{(8–6)}, Ret.
Paris Open; Paris, France; ATP 1000; Hard, indoor 9 – 15 November 2009	65 / 190	QF	(Czech Republic) Radek Štěpánek (13)	14	Loss	0–4, Ret.
ATP World Tour Finals; London, United Kingdom; ATP Finals; Hard, indoor 23 – 29 November 2009
ATP World Tour Finals; London, United Kingdom; ATP Finals; Hard, indoor 23 – 29 November 2009	66 / 193	RR	(United Kingdom) Andy Murray (4)	4	Loss	3–6, 6–3, 2–6
ATP World Tour Finals; London, United Kingdom; ATP Finals; Hard, indoor 23 – 29 November 2009	67 / 194	RR	(Spain) Fernando Verdasco (7)	8	Win	6–4, 3–6, 7–6^{(7–1)}
ATP World Tour Finals; London, United Kingdom; ATP Finals; Hard, indoor 23 – 29 November 2009	68 / 195	RR	(Switzerland) Roger Federer (1)	1	Win	6–2, 6–7^{(5–7)}, 6–3
ATP World Tour Finals; London, United Kingdom; ATP Finals; Hard, indoor 23 – 29 November 2009	69 / 196	SF	(Sweden) Robin Söderling (8)	9	Win	6–7^{(1–7)}, 6–3, 7–6^{(7–3)}
ATP World Tour Finals; London, United Kingdom; ATP Finals; Hard, indoor 23 – 29 November 2009	70 / 197	F	(Russia) Nikolay Davydenko (6)	7	Loss (2)	3–6, 4–6

== Yearly records ==
=== Head-to-head matchups ===
Juan Martín del Potro had a 54–16 match win–loss record in the 2009 season. His record against players who were part of the ATP rankings Top Ten at the time of their meetings was 11–9. Bold indicates player was ranked top 10 at time of meeting. The following list is ordered by number of wins:

- (Serbia) Viktor Troicki 3–0
- (Russia) Igor Andreev 2–0
- (Czech Republic) Tomáš Berdych 2–0
- (Croatia) Marin Čilić 2–0
- (Chile) Fernando González 2–0
- (Latvia) Ernests Gulbis 2–0
- (United States) **Andy Roddick** 2–0
- (Sweden) **Robin Söderling** 2–0
- (Switzerland) Stan Wawrinka 2–0
- (Austria) Jürgen Melzer 2–1
- (Argentina) Martín Vassallo Argüello 1–0
- (Argentina) Guillermo Cañas 1–0
- (France) Arnaud Clément 1–0
- (Spain) David Ferrer 1–0
- (Spain) Juan Carlos Ferrero 1–0
- (Romania) Victor Hănescu 1–0
- (Czech Republic) Jan Hernych 1–0
- (Chinese Taipei) Lu Yen-Hsun 1–0
- (United States) John Isner 1–0
- (Austria) Daniel Köllerer 1–0
- (France) Michaël Llodra 1–0
- (Germany) Florian Mayer 1–0
- (Czech Republic) Ivo Minář 1–0
- (Argentina) Juan Mónaco 1–0
- (Luxembourg) Gilles Müller 1–0
- (Japan) Kei Nishikori 1–0
- (United States) Sam Querrey 1–0
- (Spain) Tommy Robredo 1–0
- (Russia) Marat Safin 1–0
- (Italy) Andreas Seppi 1–0
- (Italy) Andrea Stoppini 1–0
- (United States) Ryan Sweeting 1–0
- (Serbia) Janko Tipsarević 1–0
- (France) **Jo-Wilfried Tsonga** 1–0
- (Spain) **Fernando Verdasco** 1–0
- (Germany) Mischa Zverev 1–0
- (Spain) **Rafael Nadal** 3–1
- (Switzerland) **Roger Federer** 2–3
- (United Kingdom) **Andy Murray** 1–3
- (Australia) Lleyton Hewitt 1–1
- (Croatia) Ivan Ljubičić 0–1
- (Russia) **Nikolay Davydenko** 0–1
- (Serbia) **Novak Djokovic** 0–1
- (France) Édouard Roger-Vasselin 0–1
- (United States) Mardy Fish 0–1
- (Czech Republic) Radek Štěpánek 0–2

== See also ==
- 2009 ATP World Tour
- 2009 Roger Federer tennis season
- 2009 Rafael Nadal tennis season
- 2009 Novak Djokovic tennis season
