= 2009 Mutua Madrileña Madrid Open – Women's singles =

Women's singles
- 2009 Mutua Madrileña Madrid Open

Final
- Champion: (Russia) Dinara Safina
- Runner-up: (Denmark) Caroline Wozniacki
- Score: 6–2, 6–4

Events
Singles	men	women
Doubles	men	women
← 2008 ·	Mutua Madrileña Madrid Open	· 2010 →

Dinara Safina defeated Caroline Wozniacki in the final, 6–2, 6–4 to win the inaugural women's singles tennis title at the 2009 Madrid Open.

== Seeds ==
1. (Russia) Dinara Safina (champion)
2. (United States) Serena Williams (first round, retired because of a knee injury)
3. (Russia) Elena Dementieva (third round)
4. (Serbia) Jelena Janković (quarterfinals)
5. (United States) Venus Williams (second round)
6. (Russia) Svetlana Kuznetsova (second round)
7. (Belarus) Victoria Azarenka (third round)
8. (Russia) Nadia Petrova (third round)
9. (Denmark) Caroline Wozniacki (final)
10. (Poland) Agnieszka Radwańska (first round)
11. (France) Marion Bartoli (first round)
12. (Italy) Flavia Pennetta (first round)
13. (France) Alizé Cornet (first round)
14. (Spain) Anabel Medina Garrigues (first round)
15. (China) Zheng Jie (second round)
16. (Estonia) Kaia Kanepi (first round, retired)

The four Rome semifinalists received a bye into the second round. They were as follows:

- (Russia) Dinara Safina (champion)
- (United States) Venus Williams (second round)
- (Russia) Svetlana Kuznetsova (second round)
- (Belarus) Victoria Azarenka (third round)

== Draw ==
=== Key ===
- Q = Qualifier
- WC = Wild card
- LL = Lucky loser
- Alt = Alternate
- ITF = ITF entry
- PR = Protected ranking
- SR = Special ranking
- SE = Special exempt
- JE = Junior exempt
- JR = Junior Accelerator Programme entrant
- CO = College Accelerator Programme entrant
- NG = Next Gen Accelerator Program entrant
- w/o = Walkover
- r = Retired
- d = Defaulted

=== Finals ===
Quarterfinals
1	(Russia) Dinara Safina	6	6
(Ukraine) Alona Bondarenko	4	3
4	(Serbia) Jelena Janković	6^{6}	3
(Switzerland) Patty Schnyder	7^{8}	6
(Hungary) Ágnes Szávay	7	1	1
(France) Amélie Mauresmo	5	6	6
9	(Denmark) Caroline Wozniacki	6	6
Q	(Russia) Vera Dushevina	0	4

Semifinals
1	(Russia) Dinara Safina	6	6
(Switzerland) Patty Schnyder	4	2
(France) Amélie Mauresmo	6^{1}	3
9	(Denmark) Caroline Wozniacki	7^{7}	6

Final
1	(Russia) Dinara Safina	6	6
9	(Denmark) Caroline Wozniacki	2	4

=== Top half ===
==== Section 1 ====
First round
(Spain) C Suárez Navarro	7	1	5
(China) N Li	5	6	7
(United Kingdom) A Keothavong	6	7^{7}
Q	(Colombia) M Duque Mariño	3	6^{4}
(Czech Republic) L Šafářová	6	2
16	(Estonia) K Kanepi	2	3^{r}
10	(Poland) A Radwańska	6^{4}	1
(Australia) S Stosur	7^{7}	6
(Russia) A Chakvetadze	6	6
WC	(Spain) V Ruano Pascual	4	3
(Romania) S Cîrstea	2	2
(Ukraine) A Bondarenko	6	6

Second round
1	(Russia) D Safina	6	7^{7}
(China) N Li	3	6^{2}
(United Kingdom) A Keothavong	1	5
(Czech Republic) L Šafářová	6	7
(Australia) S Stosur	6	2	6^{4}
(Russia) A Chakvetadze	1	6	7^{7}
(Ukraine) A Bondarenko	6	6
6	(Russia) S Kuznetsova	3	2

Third round
1	(Russia) D Safina	6	4	6
(Czech Republic) L Šafářová	0	6	3
(Russia) A Chakvetadze	0	6	3
(Ukraine) A Bondarenko	6	2	6

Quarterfinals
1	(Russia) D Safina	6	6
(Ukraine) A Bondarenko	4	3

==== Section 2 ====
First round
4	(Serbia) J Janković	6	6
WC	(Spain) N Llagostera Vives	2	1
(Slovakia) D Hantuchová	7^{9}	6
(Argentina) G Dulko	6^{7}	1
(France) V Razzano	6	4	6
(Thailand) T Tanasugarn	0	6	3
Q	(Russia) E Vesnina	7	6
13	(France) A Cornet	5	1
11	(France) M Bartoli	6^{2}	2
(Canada) A Wozniak	7^{7}	6
(Switzerland) P Schnyder	6	6
(Italy) S Errani	2	3
Q	(Germany) A-L Grönefeld	6	6
(Romania) M Niculescu	1	0
(Czech Republic) I Benešová	0	1^{r}
8	(Russia) N Petrova	6	2

Second round
4	(Serbia) J Janković	7	6
(Slovakia) D Hantuchová	5	2
(France) V Razzano	5	3
Q	(Russia) E Vesnina	7	6
(Canada) A Wozniak	2	4
(Switzerland) P Schnyder	6	6
Q	(Germany) A-L Grönefeld	6	6^{3}	6^{5}
8	(Russia) N Petrova	4	7^{7}	7^{7}

Third round
4	(Serbia) J Janković	6	6
Q	(Russia) E Vesnina	2	2
(Switzerland) P Schnyder	6	6^{2}	7^{7}
8	(Russia) N Petrova	4	7^{7}	6^{5}

Quarterfinals
4	(Serbia) J Janković	6^{6}	3
(Switzerland) P Schnyder	7^{8}	6

=== Bottom half ===
==== Section 3 ====
First round
(Russia) A Pavlychenkova	1	6^{2}
(China) S Peng	6	7^{7}
Q	(France) A Rezaï	6	6
(Bulgaria) T Pironkova	3	4
(Hungary) Á Szávay	6	6^{2}	6
12	(Italy) F Pennetta	3	7^{7}	2
15	(China) J Zheng	6	6
(Russia) M Kirilenko	4	4
(France) A Mauresmo	6	6
(Japan) A Sugiyama	2	4
WC	(Spain) L Domínguez Lino	7^{7}	6
Q	(Uzbekistan) A Amanmuradova	6^{5}	4
(United States) B Mattek-Sands	4	1
3	(Russia) E Dementieva	6	6

Second round
7	(Belarus) V Azarenka	6	6
(China) S Peng	4	1
Q	(France) A Rezaï	6	5	2
(Hungary) Á Szávay	2	7	6
15	(China) J Zheng	2	5
(France) A Mauresmo	6	7
WC	(Spain) L Domínguez Lino	3	2
3	(Russia) E Dementieva	6	6

Third round
7	(Belarus) V Azarenka	6	2	2
(Hungary) Á Szávay	4	6	6
(France) A Mauresmo	1	6	6
3	(Russia) E Dementieva	6	4	2

Quarterfinals
(Hungary) Á Szávay	7	1	1
(France) A Mauresmo	5	6	6

==== Section 4 ====
First round
WC	(Spain) S Soler Espinosa	3	4
(Russia) A Kleybanova	6	6
Q	(United States) V Lepchenko	7^{14}	5	6
(Slovakia) M Rybáriková	6^{12}	7	1
(Israel) S Pe'er	4^{r}
9	(Denmark) C Wozniacki	5
14	(Spain) A Medina Garrigues	3	4
Q	(Russia) V Dushevina	6	6
Q	(Italy) R Vinci	4	6	6
WC	(Spain) MJ Martínez Sánchez	6	2	4
(Austria) S Bammer	1^{r}
(Czech Republic) P Kvitová	4
(Italy) F Schiavone	6	0
2	(United States) S Williams	4	0^{r}

Second round
5	(United States) V Williams	3	6	5
(Russia) A Kleybanova	6	3	7
Q	(United States) V Lepchenko	3	1
9	(Denmark) C Wozniacki	6	6
Q	(Russia) V Dushevina	4	6	6
Q	(Italy) R Vinci	6	1	3
(Czech Republic) P Kvitová	4	2
(Italy) F Schiavone	6	6

Third round
(Russia) A Kleybanova	2	2
9	(Denmark) C Wozniacki	6	6
Q	(Russia) V Dushevina	6	4	6
(Italy) F Schiavone	3	6	2

Quarterfinals
9	(Denmark) C Wozniacki	6	6
Q	(Russia) V Dushevina	0	4
