= 2009 Roger Federer tennis season =

Statistics for Swiss tennis player

- Calendar prize money: $8,768,110

Singles
- Season record: 61–12
- Calendar titles: 4
- Year-end ranking: 1
- Ranking change from previous year: ▲1

Grand Slam & significant results
- Australian Open: F
- French Open: W
- Wimbledon: W
- US Open: F
- Other tournaments
- Tour Finals: SF

Davis Cup
- Davis Cup: WG PO (adv. to 2010 WG)

Roger Federer won two Majors in 2009, the French Open, defeating Robin Söderling in the final, and Wimbledon, defeating Andy Roddick in the final. In addition, Federer made the two other Grand Slam finals, Australian Open losing to Rafael Nadal, and the US Open, losing to Juan Martín del Potro. Federer went on to win two Master Series 1000 tournaments: in Madrid over Rafael Nadal, and in Cincinnati over Novak Djokovic. He lost in one 500 level event final in Basel to Djokovic. During the year, Federer completed the Career Grand Slam by winning his first French Open title, and won a record fifteenth Grand Slam singles title, surpassing Pete Sampras's mark of fourteen.

== Year summary ==
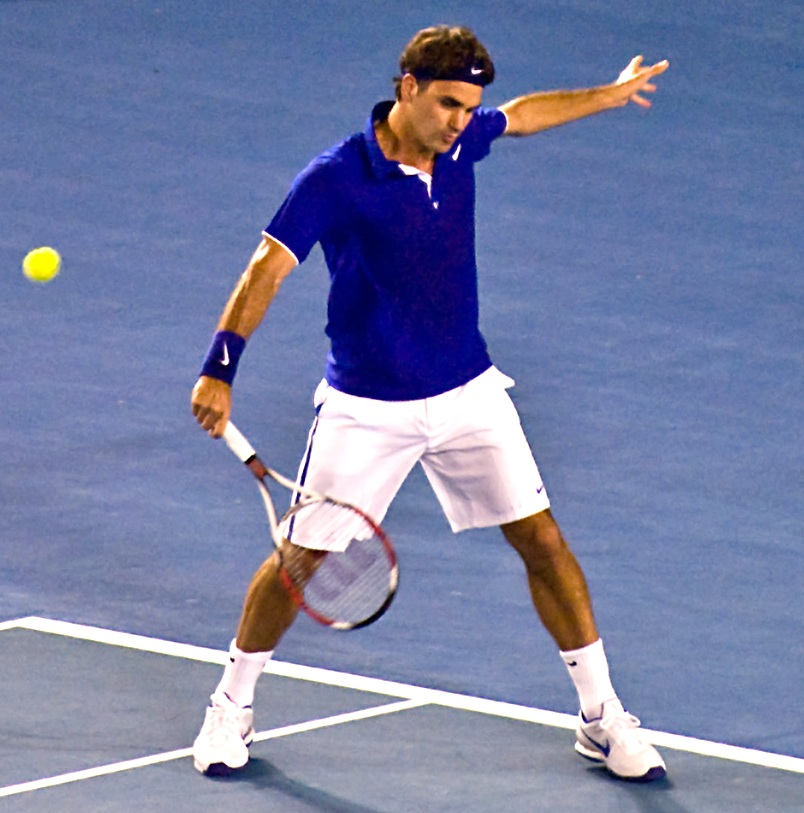
Federer at the 2009 Australian Open, where he lost to Nadal in the final in five sets.

=== Early hard-court season ===
In preparation for the Australian Open, Federer played two exhibition tournaments and one official tournament. He lost to Murray in the semifinals of the Capitala World Tennis exhibition tournament in Abu Dhabi. He then lost in the semifinals of the ATP World Tour 250 series tournament in Doha, Qatar to Murray. Federer won the AAMI Classic exhibition in Melbourne, when he defeated Stanislas Wawrinka in the final.

Federer defeated each of his first three opponents in straight sets at the Australian Open. In the fourth round, Federer rallied from two sets down to defeat Tomáš Berdych. Federer reached his record 19th consecutive Grand Slam semifinal by defeating eighth-seeded Juan Martín del Potro in the quarterfinals in only 80 minutes. In his 18th Grand Slam final, Federer was defeated by long-time rival Nadal in their first meeting on a hard court in a Grand Slam tournament. The match lasted over four hours, with Nadal victorious in five sets. Federer broke down in tears during the trophy presentation and struggled to make his runner-up speech. Federer blamed the defeat on a lack of rhythm in his first serve.

Federer withdrew from the Barclays Dubai Tennis Championships and from Switzerland's Davis Cup tie against the U.S. because of a back injury he sustained in late 2008. He stated it was "a precautionary measure" to make sure his back is "fully rehabilitated ... for the rest of the 2009 season". On 4 March, Federer's agent, Tony Godsick, announced that the Australian tennis coach Darren Cahill was working with Federer on a trial basis at Federer's training base in Dubai. One week later, Cahill opted out of the coaching position, citing the travel commitment needed.

Federer played both of the ATP World Tour Masters 1000 tournaments in the United States. At the BNP Paribas Open in Indian Wells, California, Federer lost to Murray in the semifinals. At the Sony Ericsson Open in Key Biscayne, Florida, Federer defeated his first three opponents in straight sets, after receiving a first round bye. In the semifinals against Novak Djokovic, Federer lost a match that included Federer's smashing his racket in frustration after missing a forehand approach shot by hitting it into the net, which is the same shot that cost him the 2008 Wimbledon final.

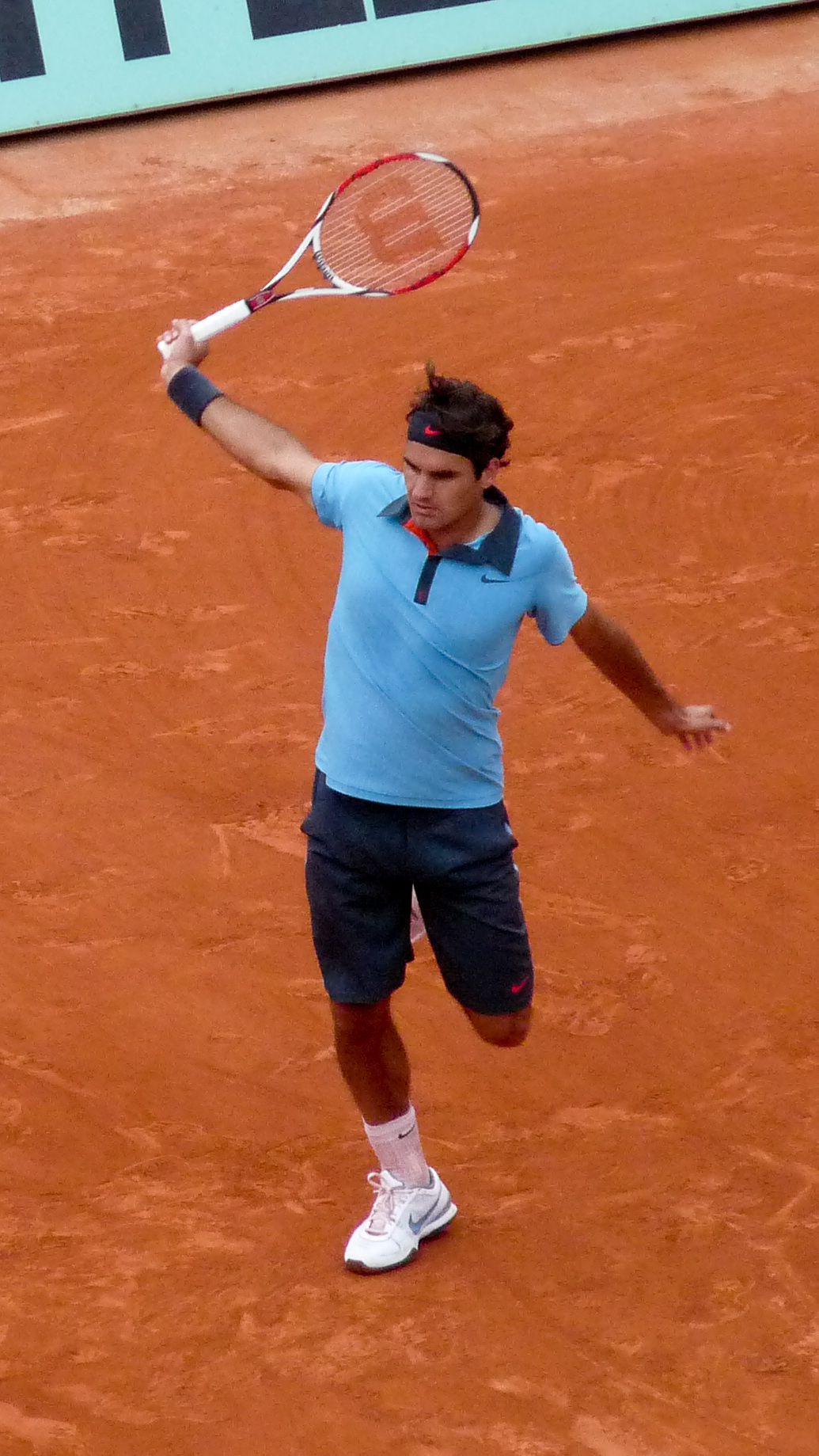
Federer completed a career Grand Slam at the 2009 French Open.

=== Clay season and French Open titles ===
After initially deciding not to participate, Federer accepted a last-minute wildcard entry at the Monte-Carlo Rolex Masters, his first clay-court event of the year. He lost to Stanislas Wawrinka for the first time in the third round.

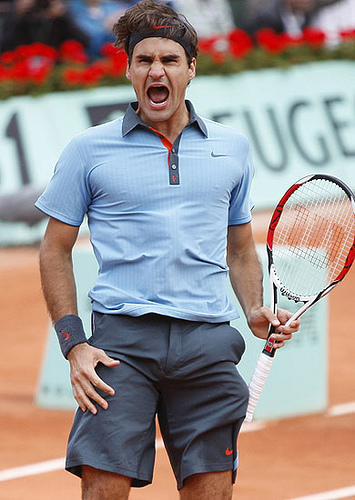
Federer reacts to winning match point in the semifinals against del Potro in an epic five-set comeback.

In the semifinals of the Internazionali BNL d'Italia in Rome, another ATP World Tour Masters 1000 series event on clay, Federer lost to Djokovic for the first time on clay.

Federer received a first-round bye in the Mutua Madrilena Madrid Open, the last ATP World Tour Masters 1000 series event on clay for the year. He defeated Nadal in the final. This ended Nadal's 33-match winning streak on clay, and for the second time Federer prevented Nadal from becoming the first man to win all three Masters Series on clay in the same year.

In the 2009 French Open, in a fourth-round encounter, Federer had to come back from two sets to love down to defeat Tommy Haas. He defeated Gaël Monfils in the quarterfinals to reach his 20th consecutive Grand Slam semifinal. He reached his fourth straight final in Paris by outlasting del Potro after coming back from 2–1 down. He won the French Open for the first time by beating Robin Söderling in the final. With this win, Federer equaled Pete Sampras's men's record of 14 Grand Slam titles and Ivan Lendl's record of 19 Grand Slam finals, and also became the sixth man in history to complete a Career Grand Slam. The call by Eurosport on match point was thus: "Federer wins the French Open for the first time in his career; and in addition must surely be regarded now as the greatest male player of all-time."

Owing to the overwhelming emotions and fatigue brought by the tournament, Federer withdrew from the Gerry Weber Open, his usual pre-Wimbledon tournament.

=== Grass season: Channel Slam, and smashing the all-time record ===
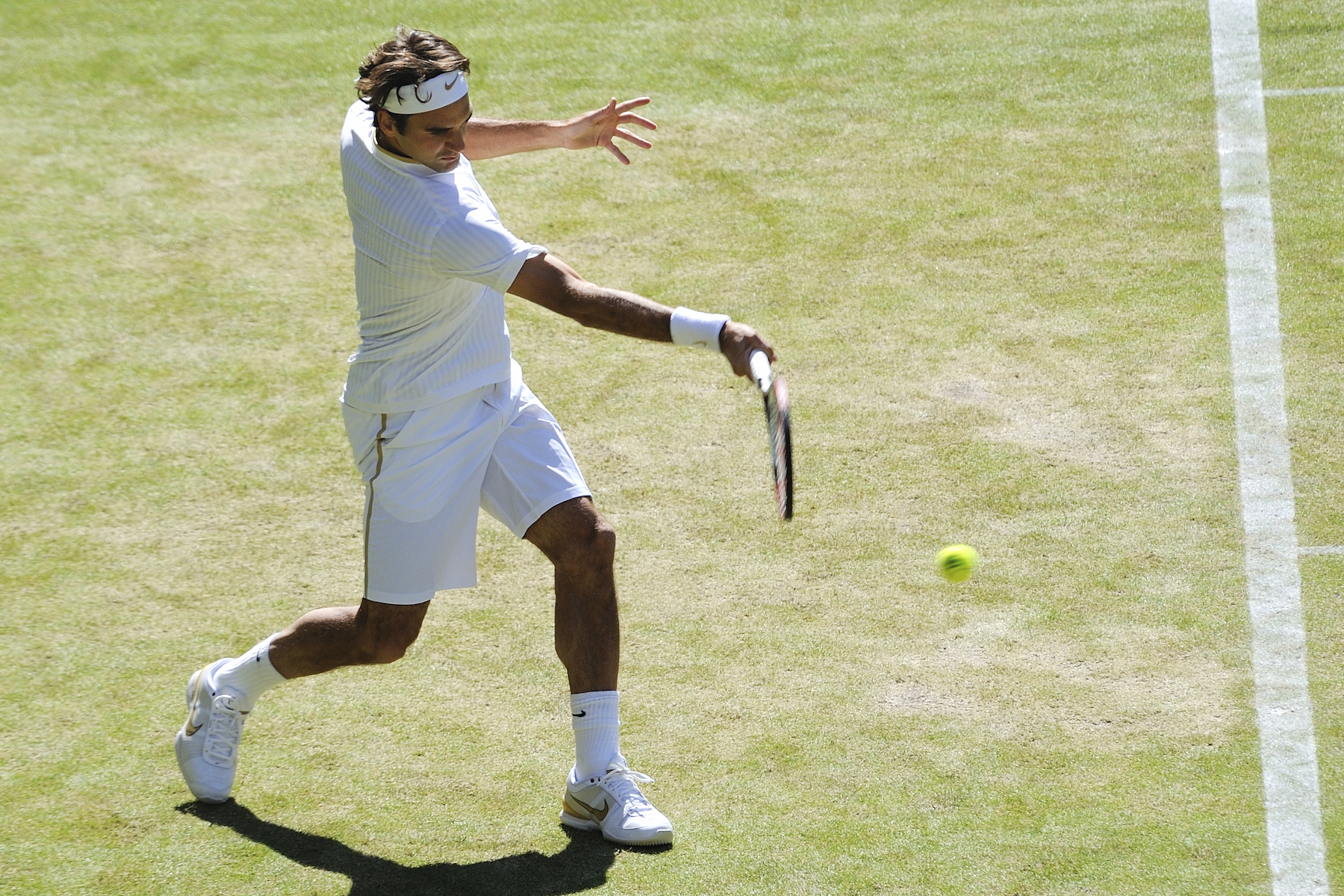
Federer set a new record for number of Grand Slam men's singles titles at the 2009 Wimbledon Championships with fifteen, and won his sixth Wimbledon title in seven years.

Federer became the highest seed for Wimbledon, after defending champion Nadal withdrew from the tournament due to tendinitis. Federer defeated Lu Yen-hsun in the first round. He moved safely into the third round with a win over Guillermo García-López. In the third round, Federer defeated Philipp Kohlschreiber. Federer then booked a place in the quarterfinals by defeating Söderling. In the quarterfinals, Federer cruised past Ivo Karlović, to extend his all-time record of consecutive Grand Slam semifinals to 21. In the semifinals, Federer defeated Tommy Haas to reach his seventh consecutive Wimbledon final, an all-time record. With this win, he also reached his 20th Grand Slam final, surpassing the previous record of 19 set by Lendl. In a match that took 4 hours and 17 minutes to complete, he beat Roddick in the final in the latest chapter of their long, though lopsided rivalry, regaining the world no. 1 spot from Rafael Nadal. The 30 total games in the fifth set was a new Grand Slam record. The match was also the longest men's singles final (in terms of games played) in Grand Slam history, with 77 games played, and the fifth set alone lasted 95 minutes. The match has been called an "instant classic" by ESPN, and received the highest TV ratings in the UK for any Wimbledon final since 2001. With the win, he also became the fourth man in the open era to win both the French Open and Wimbledon in the same year (the "Channel Slam"), following Nadal in 2008, Borg in 1978–1980, and Laver in 1969. He also joined Nadal as the only players to simultaneously hold Grand Slams on clay, grass, and hard court (2008 US Open, 2009 French Open, 2009 Wimbledon).

=== Summer hard-court season ===
Federer won his first match after a five-week break at the second round of the 2009 Rogers Cup against Frédéric Niemeyer following a first-round bye. He then defeated countryman Stanislas Wawrinka after coming back from three games down in the second set; in doing so, he made more history by contributing to the first occasion where the top 8 ranked men had all made the quarterfinals of a single tournament, joining the other seven players: Nadal, Murray, Djokovic, Roddick, del Potro, Jo-Wilfried Tsonga, and Davydenko. However, in the quarterfinals, he lost to Tsonga despite leading by four games in the final set.

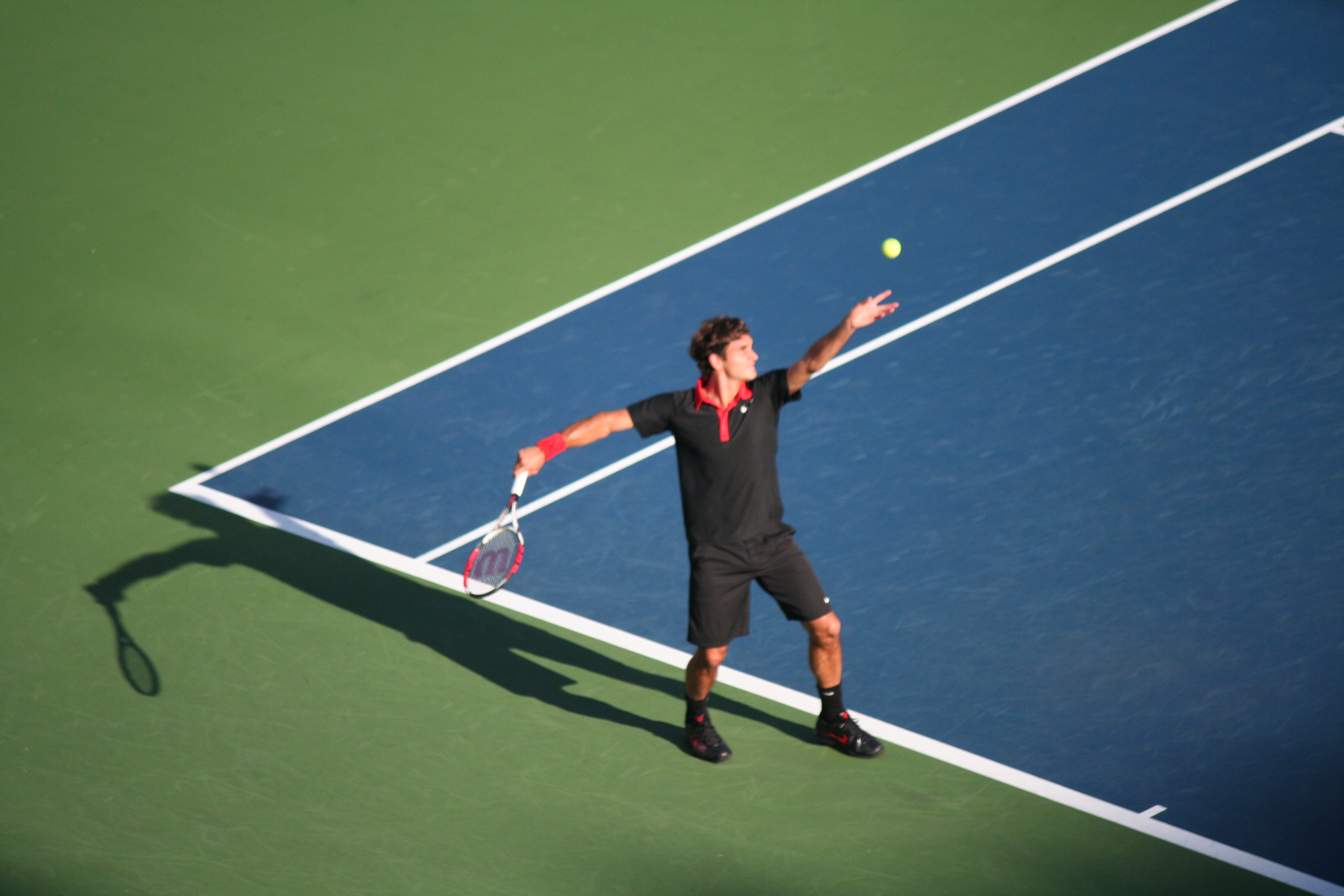
Federer was a tiebreaker away from his 6th consecutive US Open title.

Despite the relatively early exit in Montreal, Federer started off well at the 2009 Cincinnati Open, beating José Acasuso in the second round (after having another bye in the first round like the other top seeds) and David Ferrer in the third round. He then beat Lleyton Hewitt in the quarterfinals, followed by Murray in the semifinals to reach the final, where he defeated Novak Djokovic.

Federer began his US Open campaign well with a victory over unseeded Devin Britton. He advanced to the third round with a second-round win over Simon Greul. His third-round match was against Hewitt, against whom he lost his first set of the tournament, but eventually rallied to win the match. After this match, Federer held a 16–7 lead over Hewitt, continuing a fourteen match winning streak against him. Federer next defeated Tommy Robredo to book a quarterfinal berth against Robin Söderling for the third Grand Slam in a row, which he won in four sets after saving a set point in the fourth set. Federer reached his 21st Grand Slam final by defeating fourth seed Novak Djokovic for the third straight year. He triumphed and, in doing so, reached match point by performing a between-the-legs passing shot, which he later described as "...the greatest shot I ever hit in my life." He lost to del Potro in the final in five sets. The loss broke Federer's streak of forty consecutive wins at the US Open. It also marked the first time Federer had lost in a Grand Slam final to an opponent other than Rafael Nadal.

=== Fall indoor season ===
Federer went on to play in the Davis Cup tie with Italy, and in his first match on the red clay courts at Valletta Cambiaso Club, in Genoa, won in a match against Simone Bolelli. He sealed Switzerland's qualification for the World Group with a victory over Potito Starace. Following the match, Federer was quoted as saying "I was able to play very well. I have to go on holiday badly. I have a problem with my leg, I have a problem with my arm – everything is hurting. And I've got to do some baby-sitting." He later withdrew from the 2009 Japan Open and the Shanghai ATP Masters 1000.

At the Davidoff Swiss Indoors, Federer defeated Olivier Rochus, Andreas Seppi, Evgeny Korolev, and his childhood friend Marco Chiudinelli in straight sets, before losing in the finals to Novak Djokovic.

Federer's next tournament was the Paris Masters, where his six previous appearances had never extended past the quarterfinals. After a first-round bye, Federer continued his Paris Open struggles with an early exit to second-round opponent Julien Benneteau.

Federer's final tournament of the year was the 2009 ATP World Tour Finals. He beat Fernando Verdasco in the first of his round-robin matches, followed by a victory over Andy Murray, which secured him the year-end no. 1 ranking for the fifth year. However, he lost to del Potro once more, but he won enough games to qualify for the semifinals. In the semifinals, he met Nikolay Davydenko, who beat Federer for the first time in their 13 encounters. This loss ended Roger Federer's 2009 tennis season.

The year saw Federer accomplishing three major goals: winning his first French Open title, breaking Pete Sampras's record of 14 Grand Slam wins, and regaining the no. 1 ranking from Rafael Nadal.

== Matches ==
=== Grand Slam tournament performance ===
Tournament	Round	Result	Opponent	Score
Australian Open	1R	Win	(Italy) Andreas Seppi	6–1, 7–6^{(7–4)}, 7–5
Australian Open	2R	Win	(Russia) Evgeny Korolev	6–2, 6–3, 6–1
Australian Open	3R	Win	(Russia) Marat Safin	6–3, 6–2, 7–6^{(7–5)}
Australian Open	4R	Win	(Czech Republic) Tomáš Berdych	4–6, 6–7^{(6–8)}, 6–4, 6–4, 6–2
Australian Open	QF	Win	(Argentina) Juan Martín del Potro	6–3, 6–0, 6–0
Australian Open	SF	Win	(United States) Andy Roddick	6–2, 7–5, 7–5
Australian Open	F	Loss	(Spain) Rafael Nadal	5–7, 6–3, 6–7^{(3–7)}, 6–3, 2–6
French Open	1R	Win	(Spain) Alberto Martín	6–4, 6–3, 6–2
French Open	2R	Win	(Argentina) José Acasuso	7–6^{(10–8)}, 5–7, 7–6^{(7–2)}, 6–2
French Open	3R	Win	(France) Paul-Henri Mathieu	4–6, 6–1, 6–4, 6–4
French Open	4R	Win	(Germany) Tommy Haas	6–7^{(4–7)}, 5–7, 6–4, 6–0, 6–2
French Open	QF	Win	(France) Gaël Monfils	7–6^{(8–6)}, 6–2, 6–4
French Open	SF	Win	(Argentina) Juan Martín Del Potro	3–6, 7–6^{(7–2)}, 2–6, 6–1, 6–4
French Open	F	Win (14)	(Sweden) Robin Söderling	6–1, 7–6^{(7–1)}, 6–4
Wimbledon	1R	Win	(Chinese Taipei) Lu Yen-hsun	7–5, 6–3, 6–2
Wimbledon	2R	Win	(Spain) Guillermo García López	6–2, 6–2, 6–4
Wimbledon	3R	Win	(Germany) Philipp Kohlschreiber	6–3, 6–2, 6–7^{(5–7)}, 6–1
Wimbledon	4R	Win	(Sweden) Robin Söderling	6–4, 7–6^{(7–5)}, 7–6^{(7–5)}
Wimbledon	QF	Win	(Croatia) Ivo Karlović	6–3, 7–5, 7–6^{(7–3)}
Wimbledon	SF	Win	(Germany) Tommy Haas	7–6^{(7–3)}, 7–5, 6–3
Wimbledon	F	Win (15)	(United States) Andy Roddick	5–7, 7–6^{(8–6)}, 7–6^{(7–5)}, 3–6, 16–14
US Open	1R	Win	(United States) Devin Britton	6–1, 6–3, 7–5
US Open	2R	Win	(Germany) Simon Greul	6–3, 7–5, 7–5
US Open	3R	Win	(Australia) Lleyton Hewitt	4–6, 6–3, 7–5, 6–4
US Open	4R	Win	(Spain) Tommy Robredo	7–5, 6–2, 6–2
US Open	QF	Win	(Sweden) Robin Söderling	6–0, 6–3, 6–7^{(6–8)}, 7–6^{(8–6)}
US Open	SF	Win	(Serbia) Novak Djokovic	7–6 ^{(7–3)}, 7–5, 7–5
US Open	F	Loss	(Argentina) Juan Martín del Potro	6–3, 6–7^{(5–7)}, 6–4, 6–7^{(4–7)}, 2–6

=== All matches ===
==== Singles ====
Tournament	Match	Round	Opponent (seed or key)	Rank	Result	Score
Qatar ExxonMobil Open; Doha, Qatar; ATP 250; Hard, outdoor 5 – 11 January 2009
Qatar ExxonMobil Open; Doha, Qatar; ATP 250; Hard, outdoor 5 – 11 January 2009	1 / 767	1R	(Italy) Potito Starace	71	Win	6–2, 6–2
Qatar ExxonMobil Open; Doha, Qatar; ATP 250; Hard, outdoor 5 – 11 January 2009	2 / 768	2R	(Italy) Andreas Seppi	34	Win	6–3, 6–3
Qatar ExxonMobil Open; Doha, Qatar; ATP 250; Hard, outdoor 5 – 11 January 2009	3 / 769	QF	(Germany) Philipp Kohlschreiber (8)	28	Win	6–2, 7–6^{(8–6)}
Qatar ExxonMobil Open; Doha, Qatar; ATP 250; Hard, outdoor 5 – 11 January 2009	4 / 770	SF	(United Kingdom) Andy Murray (3)	4	Loss	7–6^{(8–6)}, 2–6, 2–6
Australian Open; Melbourne, Australia; Grand Slam tournament Hard, outdoor 19 January – 1 February 2009
Australian Open; Melbourne, Australia; Grand Slam tournament Hard, outdoor 19 January – 1 February 2009	5 / 771	1R	(Italy) Andreas Seppi	35	Win	6–1, 7–6^{(7–4)}, 7–5
Australian Open; Melbourne, Australia; Grand Slam tournament Hard, outdoor 19 January – 1 February 2009	6 / 772	2R	(Russia) Evgeny Korolev (Q)	118	Win	6–2, 6–3, 6–1
Australian Open; Melbourne, Australia; Grand Slam tournament Hard, outdoor 19 January – 1 February 2009	7 / 773	3R	(Russia) Marat Safin (26)	27	Win	6–3, 6–2, 7–6^{(7–5)}
Australian Open; Melbourne, Australia; Grand Slam tournament Hard, outdoor 19 January – 1 February 2009	8 / 774	4R	(Czech Republic) Tomáš Berdych (20)	21	Win	4–6, 6–7^{(4–7)}, 6–4, 6–4, 6–2
Australian Open; Melbourne, Australia; Grand Slam tournament Hard, outdoor 19 January – 1 February 2009	9 / 775	QF	(Argentina) Juan Martín del Potro (8)	6	Win	6–3, 6–0, 6–0
Australian Open; Melbourne, Australia; Grand Slam tournament Hard, outdoor 19 January – 1 February 2009	10 / 776	SF	(United States) Andy Roddick (7)	9	Win	6–2, 7–5, 7–5
Australian Open; Melbourne, Australia; Grand Slam tournament Hard, outdoor 19 January – 1 February 2009	11 / 777	F	(Spain) Rafael Nadal (1)	1	Loss (1)	5–7, 6–3, 6–7^{(3–7)}, 6–3, 2–6
BNP Paribas Open; Indian Wells, United States; ATP 1000; Hard, outdoor 9 – 22 March 2009
BNP Paribas Open; Indian Wells, United States; ATP 1000; Hard, outdoor 9 – 22 March 2009	– / –	1R	Bye			
BNP Paribas Open; Indian Wells, United States; ATP 1000; Hard, outdoor 9 – 22 March 2009	12 / 778	2R	(France) Marc Gicquel	52	Win	7–6^{(7–4)}, 6–4
BNP Paribas Open; Indian Wells, United States; ATP 1000; Hard, outdoor 9 – 22 March 2009	13 / 779	3R	(Croatia) Ivo Karlović (27)	28	Win	7–6^{(7–4)}, 6–3
BNP Paribas Open; Indian Wells, United States; ATP 1000; Hard, outdoor 9 – 22 March 2009	14 / 780	4R	(Chile) Fernando González (17)	17	Win	6–3, 5–7, 6–2
BNP Paribas Open; Indian Wells, United States; ATP 1000; Hard, outdoor 9 – 22 March 2009	15 / 781	QF	(Spain) Fernando Verdasco (10)	10	Win	6–3, 7–6^{(7–5)}
BNP Paribas Open; Indian Wells, United States; ATP 1000; Hard, outdoor 9 – 22 March 2009	16 / 782	SF	(United Kingdom) Andy Murray (4)	4	Loss	3–6, 6–4, 1–6
Sony Ericsson Open; Miami, United States; ATP 1000; Hard, outdoor 23 March – 5 April 2009
Sony Ericsson Open; Miami, United States; ATP 1000; Hard, outdoor 23 March – 5 April 2009	– / –	1R	Bye			
Sony Ericsson Open; Miami, United States; ATP 1000; Hard, outdoor 23 March – 5 April 2009	17 / 783	2R	(United States) Kevin Kim (Q)	107	Win	6–3, 6–2
Sony Ericsson Open; Miami, United States; ATP 1000; Hard, outdoor 23 March – 5 April 2009	18 / 784	3R	(Germany) Nicolas Kiefer (28)	29	Win	6–4, 6–1
Sony Ericsson Open; Miami, United States; ATP 1000; Hard, outdoor 23 March – 5 April 2009	19 / 785	4R	(United States) Taylor Dent (Q)	467	Win	6–3, 6–2
Sony Ericsson Open; Miami, United States; ATP 1000; Hard, outdoor 23 March – 5 April 2009	20 / 786	QF	(United States) Andy Roddick (5)	6	Win	6–3, 4–6, 6–4
Sony Ericsson Open; Miami, United States; ATP 1000; Hard, outdoor 23 March – 5 April 2009	21 / 787	SF	(Serbia) Novak Djokovic (3)	3	Loss	6–3, 2–6, 3–6
Monte Carlo Rolex Masters; Monte Carlo, Monaco; ATP 1000; Clay, outdoor 13 – 19 April 2009
Monte Carlo Rolex Masters; Monte Carlo, Monaco; ATP 1000; Clay, outdoor 13 – 19 April 2009	– / –	1R	Bye			
Monte Carlo Rolex Masters; Monte Carlo, Monaco; ATP 1000; Clay, outdoor 13 – 19 April 2009	22 / 788	2R	(Italy) Andreas Seppi	40	Win	6–4, 6–4
Monte Carlo Rolex Masters; Monte Carlo, Monaco; ATP 1000; Clay, outdoor 13 – 19 April 2009	23 / 789	3R	(Switzerland) Stanislas Wawrinka (13)	16	Loss	4–6, 5–7
Internazionali BNL d'Italia; Rome, Italy; ATP 1000; Clay, outdoor 27 April – 3 May 2009
Internazionali BNL d'Italia; Rome, Italy; ATP 1000; Clay, outdoor 27 April – 3 May 2009	– / –	1R	Bye			
Internazionali BNL d'Italia; Rome, Italy; ATP 1000; Clay, outdoor 27 April – 3 May 2009	24 / 790	2R	(Croatia) Ivo Karlović	24	Win	6–4, 6–4
Internazionali BNL d'Italia; Rome, Italy; ATP 1000; Clay, outdoor 27 April – 3 May 2009	25 / 791	3R	(Czech Republic) Radek Štěpánek (16)	19	Win	6–1, 6–1
Internazionali BNL d'Italia; Rome, Italy; ATP 1000; Clay, outdoor 27 April – 3 May 2009	26 / 792	QF	(Germany) Mischa Zverev (Q)	76	Win	7–6^{(7–3)}, 6–2
Internazionali BNL d'Italia; Rome, Italy; ATP 1000; Clay, outdoor 27 April – 3 May 2009	27 / 793	SF	(Serbia) Novak Djokovic (3)	3	Loss	6–4, 3–6, 3–6
Mutua Madrileña Madrid Open; Madrid, Spain; ATP 1000; Clay, outdoor 11 – 17 May 2009
Mutua Madrileña Madrid Open; Madrid, Spain; ATP 1000; Clay, outdoor 11 – 17 May 2009	– / –	1R	Bye			
Mutua Madrileña Madrid Open; Madrid, Spain; ATP 1000; Clay, outdoor 11 – 17 May 2009	28 / 794	2R	(Sweden) Robin Söderling	23	Win	6–1, 7–5
Mutua Madrileña Madrid Open; Madrid, Spain; ATP 1000; Clay, outdoor 11 – 17 May 2009	29 / 795	3R	(United States) James Blake (14)	16	Win	6–2, 6–4
Mutua Madrileña Madrid Open; Madrid, Spain; ATP 1000; Clay, outdoor 11 – 17 May 2009	30 / 796	QF	(United States) Andy Roddick (6)	6	Win	7–5, 6–7^{(5–7)}, 6–1
Mutua Madrileña Madrid Open; Madrid, Spain; ATP 1000; Clay, outdoor 11 – 17 May 2009	31 / 797	SF	(Argentina) Juan Martín del Potro (5)	5	Win	6–3, 6–4
Mutua Madrileña Madrid Open; Madrid, Spain; ATP 1000; Clay, outdoor 11 – 17 May 2009	32 / 798	W	(Spain) Rafael Nadal (1)	1	Win (1)	6–4, 6–4
French Open; Paris, France; Grand Slam tournament Clay, outdoor 25 May – 7 June 2009
French Open; Paris, France; Grand Slam tournament Clay, outdoor 25 May – 7 June 2009	33 / 799	1R	(Spain) Alberto Martín	98	Win	6–4, 6–3, 6–2
French Open; Paris, France; Grand Slam tournament Clay, outdoor 25 May – 7 June 2009	34 / 800	2R	(Argentina) José Acasuso	45	Win	7–6^{(10–8)}, 5–7, 7–6^{(7–2)}, 6–2
French Open; Paris, France; Grand Slam tournament Clay, outdoor 25 May – 7 June 2009	35 / 801	3R	(France) Paul-Henri Mathieu (32)	35	Win	4–6, 6–1, 6–4, 6–4
French Open; Paris, France; Grand Slam tournament Clay, outdoor 25 May – 7 June 2009	36 / 802	4R	(Germany) Tommy Haas	63	Win	6–7^{(4–7)}, 5–7, 6–4, 6–0, 6–2
French Open; Paris, France; Grand Slam tournament Clay, outdoor 25 May – 7 June 2009	37 / 803	QF	(France) Gaël Monfils (11)	10	Win	7–6^{(8–6)}, 6–2, 6–4
French Open; Paris, France; Grand Slam tournament Clay, outdoor 25 May – 7 June 2009	38 / 804	SF	(Argentina) Juan Martín del Potro (5)	5	Win	3–6, 7–6^{(7–2)}, 2–6, 6–1, 6–4
French Open; Paris, France; Grand Slam tournament Clay, outdoor 25 May – 7 June 2009	39 / 805	W	(Sweden) Robin Söderling (23)	25	Win (2)	6–1, 7–6^{(7–1)}, 6–4
The Championships, Wimbledon; London, United Kingdom; Grand Slam tournament Grass, outdoor 22 June – 5 July 2009
The Championships, Wimbledon; London, United Kingdom; Grand Slam tournament Grass, outdoor 22 June – 5 July 2009	40 / 806	1R	(Chinese Taipei) Lu Yen-hsun	65	Win	7–5, 6–3, 6–2
The Championships, Wimbledon; London, United Kingdom; Grand Slam tournament Grass, outdoor 22 June – 5 July 2009	41 / 807	2R	(Spain) Guillermo García-López	42	Win	6–2, 6–2, 6–4
The Championships, Wimbledon; London, United Kingdom; Grand Slam tournament Grass, outdoor 22 June – 5 July 2009	42 / 808	3R	(Germany) Philipp Kohlschreiber (27)	32	Win	6–3, 6–2, 6–7^{(5–7)}, 6–1
The Championships, Wimbledon; London, United Kingdom; Grand Slam tournament Grass, outdoor 22 June – 5 July 2009	43 / 809	4R	(Sweden) Robin Söderling (13)	12	Win	6–4, 7–6^{(7–5)}, 7–6^{(7–5)}
The Championships, Wimbledon; London, United Kingdom; Grand Slam tournament Grass, outdoor 22 June – 5 July 2009	44 / 810	QF	(Croatia) Ivo Karlović (22)	36	Win	6–3, 7–5, 7–6^{(7–3)}
The Championships, Wimbledon; London, United Kingdom; Grand Slam tournament Grass, outdoor 22 June – 5 July 2009	45 / 811	SF	(Germany) Tommy Haas (24)	34	Win	7–6^{(7–3)}, 7–5, 6–3
The Championships, Wimbledon; London, United Kingdom; Grand Slam tournament Grass, outdoor 22 June – 5 July 2009	46 / 812	W	(United States) Andy Roddick (6)	6	Win (3)	5–7, 7–6^{(8–6)}, 7–6^{(7–5)}, 3–6, 16–14
Rogers Cup; Montreal, Canada; ATP 1000; Hard, outdoor 10 – 16 August 2009
Rogers Cup; Montreal, Canada; ATP 1000; Hard, outdoor 10 – 16 August 2009	– / –	1R	Bye			
Rogers Cup; Montreal, Canada; ATP 1000; Hard, outdoor 10 – 16 August 2009	47 / 813	2R	(Canada) Frédéric Niemeyer (WC)	487	Win	7–6^{(7–3)}, 6–4
Rogers Cup; Montreal, Canada; ATP 1000; Hard, outdoor 10 – 16 August 2009	48 / 814	3R	(Switzerland) Stanislas Wawrinka	22	Win	6–3, 7–6^{(7–5)}
Rogers Cup; Montreal, Canada; ATP 1000; Hard, outdoor 10 – 16 August 2009	49 / 815	QF	(France) Jo-Wilfried Tsonga (7)	7	Loss	6–7^{(5–7)}, 6–1, 6–7^{(3–7)}
W&S Financial Group Masters; Cincinnati, United States; ATP 1000; Hard, outdoor 17 – 23 August 2009
W&S Financial Group Masters; Cincinnati, United States; ATP 1000; Hard, outdoor 17 – 23 August 2009	– / –	1R	Bye			
W&S Financial Group Masters; Cincinnati, United States; ATP 1000; Hard, outdoor 17 – 23 August 2009	50 / 816	2R	(Argentina) José Acasuso	51	Win	6–3, 7–5
W&S Financial Group Masters; Cincinnati, United States; ATP 1000; Hard, outdoor 17 – 23 August 2009	51 / 817	3R	(Spain) David Ferrer	19	Win	3–6, 6–3, 6–4
W&S Financial Group Masters; Cincinnati, United States; ATP 1000; Hard, outdoor 17 – 23 August 2009	52 / 818	QF	(Australia) Lleyton Hewitt	42	Win	6–3, 6–4
W&S Financial Group Masters; Cincinnati, United States; ATP 1000; Hard, outdoor 17 – 23 August 2009	53 / 819	SF	(United Kingdom) Andy Murray (3)	2	Win	6–2, 7–6^{(10–8)}
W&S Financial Group Masters; Cincinnati, United States; ATP 1000; Hard, outdoor 17 – 23 August 2009	54 / 820	W	(Serbia) Novak Djokovic (4)	4	Win (4)	6–1, 7–5
US Open; New York City, United States; Grand Slam tournament Hard, outdoor 31 August – 13 September 2009
US Open; New York City, United States; Grand Slam tournament Hard, outdoor 31 August – 13 September 2009	55 / 821	1R	(United States) Devin Britton (WC)	1370	Win	6–1, 6–3, 7–5
US Open; New York City, United States; Grand Slam tournament Hard, outdoor 31 August – 13 September 2009	56 / 822	2R	(Germany) Simon Greul	65	Win	6–3, 7–5, 7–5
US Open; New York City, United States; Grand Slam tournament Hard, outdoor 31 August – 13 September 2009	57 / 823	3R	(Australia) Lleyton Hewitt (31)	32	Win	4–6, 6–3, 7–5, 6–4
US Open; New York City, United States; Grand Slam tournament Hard, outdoor 31 August – 13 September 2009	58 / 824	4R	(Spain) Tommy Robredo (14)	15	Win	7–5, 6–2, 6–2
US Open; New York City, United States; Grand Slam tournament Hard, outdoor 31 August – 13 September 2009	59 / 825	QF	(Sweden) Robin Söderling (12)	12	Win	6–0, 6–3, 6–7^{(6–8)}, 7–6^{(8–6)}
US Open; New York City, United States; Grand Slam tournament Hard, outdoor 31 August – 13 September 2009	60 / 826	SF	(Serbia) Novak Djokovic (4)	4	Win	7–6^{(7–3)}, 7–5, 7–5
US Open; New York City, United States; Grand Slam tournament Hard, outdoor 31 August – 13 September 2009	61 / 827	F	(Argentina) Juan Martín del Potro (6)	6	Loss (2)	6–3, 6–7^{(5–7)}, 6–4, 6–7^{(4–7)}, 2–6
Davis Cup, World Group play-offs Genoa, Italy; Davis Cup; Clay, outdoor 18 – 20 September 2009
Davis Cup, World Group play-offs Genoa, Italy; Davis Cup; Clay, outdoor 18 – 20 September 2009	62 / 828	PO; R2	(Italy) Simone Bolelli	64	Win	6–3, 6–4, 6–1
Davis Cup, World Group play-offs Genoa, Italy; Davis Cup; Clay, outdoor 18 – 20 September 2009	63 / 829	PO; R4	(Italy) Potito Starace	90	Win	6–3, 6–0, 6–4
Davidoff Swiss Indoors; Basel, Switzerland; ATP 500; Hard, indoor 2 – 8 November 2009
Davidoff Swiss Indoors; Basel, Switzerland; ATP 500; Hard, indoor 2 – 8 November 2009	64 / 830	1R	(Belgium) Olivier Rochus (Q)	61	Win	6–3, 6–4
Davidoff Swiss Indoors; Basel, Switzerland; ATP 500; Hard, indoor 2 – 8 November 2009	65 / 831	2R	(Italy) Andreas Seppi	51	Win	6–3, 6–3
Davidoff Swiss Indoors; Basel, Switzerland; ATP 500; Hard, indoor 2 – 8 November 2009	66 / 832	QF	(Russia) Evgeny Korolev (Q)	58	Win	6–3, 6–2
Davidoff Swiss Indoors; Basel, Switzerland; ATP 500; Hard, indoor 2 – 8 November 2009	67 / 833	SF	(Switzerland) Marco Chiudinelli (WC)	73	Win	7–6^{(9–7)}, 6–3
Davidoff Swiss Indoors; Basel, Switzerland; ATP 500; Hard, indoor 2 – 8 November 2009	68 / 834	F	(Serbia) Novak Djokovic (2)	3	Loss (3)	4–6, 6–4, 2–6
BNP Paribas Masters; Paris, France; ATP 1000; Hard, indoor 9 – 15 November 2009
BNP Paribas Masters; Paris, France; ATP 1000; Hard, indoor 9 – 15 November 2009	– / –	1R	Bye			
BNP Paribas Masters; Paris, France; ATP 1000; Hard, indoor 9 – 15 November 2009	69 / 835	2R	(France) Julien Benneteau	49	Loss	6–3, 6–7^{(4–7)}, 4–6
ATP World Tour Finals; London, United Kingdom; ATP Finals; Hard, indoor 23 – 29 November 2009
ATP World Tour Finals; London, United Kingdom; ATP Finals; Hard, indoor 23 – 29 November 2009	70 / 836	RR	(Spain) Fernando Verdasco (7)	8	Win	4–6, 7–5, 6–1
ATP World Tour Finals; London, United Kingdom; ATP Finals; Hard, indoor 23 – 29 November 2009	71 / 837	RR	(United Kingdom) Andy Murray (4)	4	Win	3–6, 6–3, 6–1
ATP World Tour Finals; London, United Kingdom; ATP Finals; Hard, indoor 23 – 29 November 2009	72 / 838	RR	(Argentina) Juan Martín del Potro (5)	5	Loss	2–6, 7–6^{(7–5)}, 3–6
ATP World Tour Finals; London, United Kingdom; ATP Finals; Hard, indoor 23 – 29 November 2009	73 / 839	SF	(Russia) Nikolay Davydenko (6)	7	Loss	2–6, 6–4, 5–7

==== Exhibition matches ====
Tournament	Round	Opponent	Result	Score
Capitala World Tennis Championship; Abu Dhabi, United Arab Emirates; Exhibition; Hard, outdoor 1 – 3 January 2009	QF	Bye		
Capitala World Tennis Championship; Abu Dhabi, United Arab Emirates; Exhibition; Hard, outdoor 1 – 3 January 2009	SF	(United Kingdom) Andy Murray	Loss	6–4, 2–6, 6–7^{(6–8)}
AAMI Classic; Kooyong, Australia; Exhibition; Hard, outdoor 14 – 17 January 2009	QF	(Spain) Carlos Moyá	Win	6–2, 6–3
AAMI Classic; Kooyong, Australia; Exhibition; Hard, outdoor 14 – 17 January 2009	SF	(Spain) Fernando Verdasco	Win	6–3, 3–6, 7–6^{(7–5)}
AAMI Classic; Kooyong, Australia; Exhibition; Hard, outdoor 14 – 17 January 2009	W	(Switzerland) Stanislas Wawrinka	Win	6–1, 6–3
Masters Guinot-Mary Cohr; Paris, France; Exhibition; Clay, outdoor 20 – 22 May 2009	W R3	(Switzerland) Stanislas Wawrinka	Win	6–2, 6–4

==== Doubles ====
Tournament	Match	Round	Opponents (seed or key)	Ranks	Result	Score
BNP Paribas Open; Indian Wells, United States; ATP 1000; Hard, outdoor 9 – 22 March 2009; Partner: (Switzerland) Yves Allegro
BNP Paribas Open; Indian Wells, United States; ATP 1000; Hard, outdoor 9 – 22 March 2009; Partner: (Switzerland) Yves Allegro	1	1R	(United States) Bob Bryan / (United States) Mike Bryan (1)	#1 / #1	Loss	2–6, 0–6
Davidoff Swiss Indoors; Basel, Switzerland; ATP 500; Hard, indoor 2 – 8 November 2009; Partner: (Switzerland) Marco Chiudinelli
Davidoff Swiss Indoors; Basel, Switzerland; ATP 500; Hard, indoor 2 – 8 November 2009; Partner: (Switzerland) Marco Chiudinelli	2	1R	(United States) James Cerretani / (Pakistan) Aisam-ul-Haq Qureshi	#67 / #71	Loss	4–6, 3–6

== Yearly records ==
=== Finals ===
==== Singles: 7 (4–3) ====
Legend Grand Slam (2–2) ATP World Tour Finals (0–0) ATP World Tour Masters 1000 (2–0) ATP World Tour 500 Series (0–1) ATP World Tour 250 Series (0–0)	Titles by surface Hard (1–3) Clay (2–0) Grass (1–0)	Titles by surface Outdoors (4–2) Indoors (0–1)

Result	No.	Date	Tournament	Surface	Opponents	Score
Loss	22.	1 February 2009	Australian Open, Australia	Hard	(Spain) Rafael Nadal	5–7, 6–3, 6–7^{(3–7)}, 6–3, 2–6
Win	58.	17 May 2009	Madrid Open, Spain (2)	Clay	(Spain) Rafael Nadal	6–4, 6–4
Win	59.	7 June 2009	French Open, Paris, France	Clay	(Sweden) Robin Söderling	6–1, 7–6^{(7–1)}, 6–4
Win	60.	5 July 2009	Wimbledon, London, England, UK (6)	Grass	(United States) Andy Roddick	5–7, 7–6^{(8–6)}, 7–6^{(7–5)}, 3–6, 16–14
Win	61.	23 August 2009	Cincinnati Masters, United States (3)	Hard	(Serbia) Novak Djokovic	6–1, 7–5
Loss	23.	14 September 2009	US Open, New York City, United States	Hard	(Argentina) Juan Martín del Potro	6–3, 6–7^{(5–7)}, 6–4, 6–7^{(4–7)}, 2–6
Loss	24.	8 November 2009	Swiss Indoors, Switzerland	Hard (i)	(Serbia) Novak Djokovic	4–6, 6–4, 2–6

== See also ==
- Roger Federer
- Roger Federer career statistics
