= 2009 Italian Open – Men's singles =

Men's singles
- 2009 Italian Open

Final
- Champion: (Spain) Rafael Nadal
- Runner-up: (Serbia) Novak Djokovic
- Score: 7–6^{(7–2)}, 6–2

Events
Singles	men	women
Doubles	men	women
- Italian Open

Rafael Nadal defeated defending champion Novak Djokovic in the final, 7–6^{(7–2)}, 6–2 to win the men's singles tennis title at the 2009 Italian Open. He did not drop a set en route to his record fourth Italian Open title.

== Seeds ==
The top eight seeds receive a bye into the second round.

1. (Spain) Rafael Nadal (champion)
2. (Switzerland) Roger Federer (semifinals)
3. (Serbia) Novak Djokovic (final)
4. (United Kingdom) Andy Murray (second round)
5. (Argentina) Juan Martín del Potro (quarterfinals)
6. (Spain) Fernando Verdasco (quarterfinals)
7. (Russia) Nikolay Davydenko (second round)
8. (France) Gilles Simon (third round)
9. (France) Jo-Wilfried Tsonga (first round)
10. (Switzerland) Stanislas Wawrinka (third round)
11. (Spain) David Ferrer (first round)
12. (Chile) Fernando González (semifinals)
13. (Spain) Tommy Robredo (third round)
14. (United States) James Blake (first round)
15. (Croatia) Marin Čilić (third round)
16. (Czech Republic) Radek Štěpánek (third round)

== Draw ==
Key

- Q = Qualifier
- WC = Wild card
- LL = Lucky loser
- Alt = Alternate
- ITF = ITF entry
- PR = Protected ranking
- SR = Special ranking
- SE = Special exempt
- JE = Junior exempt
- JR = Junior Accelerator Programme entrant
- CO = College Accelerator Programme entrant
- NG = Next Gen Accelerator Program entrant
- w/o = Walkover
- r = Retired
- d = Defaulted

=== Finals ===
Quarterfinals
1	(Spain) Rafael Nadal	6	6
6	(Spain) Fernando Verdasco	3	3
Q	(Argentina) Juan Mónaco	6	3	4
12	(Chile) Fernando González	2	6	6
5	(Argentina) Juan Martín del Potro	3	4
3	(Serbia) Novak Djokovic	6	6
Q	(Germany) Mischa Zverev	6^{3}	2
2	(Switzerland) Roger Federer	7^{7}	6

Semifinals
1	(Spain) Rafael Nadal	6	6
12	(Chile) Fernando González	3	3
3	(Serbia) Novak Djokovic	4	6	6
2	(Switzerland) Roger Federer	6	3	3

Final
1	(Spain) Rafael Nadal	7^{7}	6
3	(Serbia) Novak Djokovic	6^{2}	2

=== Top half ===
==== Section 1 ====
First round
(Italy) A Seppi	3	6	6
(United States) S Querrey	6	4	3
(Sweden) R Söderling	6	6
(Spain) M Granollers	3	0
Q	(Romania) V Crivoi	7	6
14	(United States) J Blake	5	3
9	(France) J-W Tsonga	6^{2}	4
(France) R Gasquet	7^{7}	6
(Spain) N Almagro	6	6^{5}	2
(Latvia) E Gulbis	3	7^{7}	6
(United States) M Fish	6	4	7^{7}
(Russia) I Andreev	3	6	6^{2}

Second round
1	(Spain) R Nadal	6	6
(Italy) A Seppi	2	3
(Sweden) R Söderling	6	6^{2}	6
Q	(Romania) V Crivoi	1	7^{7}	1
(France) R Gasquet	6	1	6
(Latvia) E Gulbis	2	6	4
(United States) M Fish	4	7	3
6	(Spain) F Verdasco	6	5	6

Third round
1	(Spain) R Nadal	6	6
(Sweden) R Söderling	1	0
(France) R Gasquet	5	4
6	(Spain) F Verdasco	7	6

Quarterfinals
1	(Spain) R Nadal	6	6
6	(Spain) F Verdasco	3	3

==== Section 2 ====
First round
(Germany) N Kiefer	2	3
Q	(Argentina) J Mónaco	6	6
(Argentina) JI Chela	1	2
(Belgium) C Rochus	6	6
WC	(Italy) F Cipolla	2	2
15	(Croatia) M Čilić	6	6
12	(Chile) F González	6	6
(France) J Chardy	4	1
(Serbia) J Tipsarević	6	6
(Argentina) J Acasuso	3	4
(France) J Benneteau	6	2	3
(Austria) J Melzer	3	6	6

Second round
4	(United Kingdom) A Murray	6	3	5
Q	(Argentina) J Mónaco	1	6	7
(Belgium) C Rochus	0	7	2
15	(Croatia) M Čilić	6	5	6
12	(Chile) F González	6	6
(Serbia) J Tipsarević	4	4
(Austria) J Melzer	7	7^{7}
7	(Russia) N Davydenko	5	6^{5}

Third round
Q	(Argentina) J Mónaco	6	6
15	(Croatia) M Čilić	4	4
12	(Chile) F González	3	6	7
(Austria) J Melzer	6	3	5

Quarterfinals
Q	(Argentina) J Mónaco	6	3	4
12	(Chile) F González	2	6	6

=== Bottom half ===
==== Section 3 ====
First round
(Romania) V Hănescu	3	3
(Serbia) V Troicki	6	6
Q	(Spain) D Gimeno Traver	5	4
Q	(Russia) M Youzhny	7	6
(Russia) I Kunitsyn	3	4
10	(Switzerland) S Wawrinka	6	6
13	(Spain) T Robredo	2	7^{7}	6
(Russia) M Safin	6	6^{5}	2
(Germany) P Kohlschreiber	4	6	6
(Italy) S Bolelli	6	1	0
WC	(Italy) P Starace	6^{8}	4
(Spain) A Montañés	7^{10}	6

Second round
5	(Argentina) JM del Potro	6	1	6
(Serbia) V Troicki	3	6	3
Q	(Russia) M Youzhny	3	6^{5}
10	(Switzerland) S Wawrinka	6	7^{7}
13	(Spain) T Robredo	6	7^{7}
(Germany) P Kohlschreiber	2	6^{5}
(Spain) A Montañés	6^{5}	0
3	(Serbia) N Djokovic	7^{7}	6

Third round
5	(Argentina) JM del Potro	6	6^{5}	6
10	(Switzerland) S Wawrinka	2	7^{7}	3
13	(Spain) T Robredo	1	1
3	(Serbia) N Djokovic	6	6

Quarterfinals
5	(Argentina) JM del Potro	3	4
3	(Serbia) N Djokovic	6	6

==== Section 4 ====
First round
WC	(Italy) F Fognini	6^{3}	6	7^{7}
WC	(Italy) F Volandri	7^{7}	1	6^{4}
Q	(Germany) M Zverev	4	6	7
(Czech Republic) T Berdych	6	2	5
(France) P-H Mathieu	6	2	6
11	(Spain) D Ferrer	3	6	2
16	(Czech Republic) R Štěpánek	7^{7}	4	7
(France) F Serra	6^{1}	6	5
Q	(Brazil) T Bellucci	4	2
(Spain) F López	6	6
Q	(Czech Republic) J Hernych	6	4	2
(Croatia) I Karlović	4	6	6

Second round
8	(France) G Simon	6^{8}	6	6
WC	(Italy) F Fognini	7^{10}	2	3
Q	(Germany) M Zverev	3	7^{7}	6
(France) P-H Mathieu	6	6^{5}	0
16	(Czech Republic) R Štěpánek	6	6
(Spain) F López	2	1
(Croatia) I Karlović	4	4
2	(Switzerland) R Federer	6	6

Third round
8	(France) G Simon	4	1
Q	(Germany) M Zverev	6	6
16	(Czech Republic) R Štěpánek	4	1
2	(Switzerland) R Federer	6	6

Quarterfinals
Q	(Germany) M Zverev	6^{3}	2
2	(Switzerland) R Federer	7^{7}	6

== Qualifying ==
=== Seeds ===
1. (France) Arnaud Clément (qualifying competition)
2. (Argentina) Juan Mónaco (qualified)
3. (Germany) Andreas Beck (qualifying competition)
4. (Czech Republic) Jan Hernych (qualified)
5. (Russia) Teymuraz Gabashvili (qualifying competition)
6. (Spain) Óscar Hernández (qualifying competition)
7. (Spain) Juan Carlos Ferrero (qualifying competition)
8. (Spain) Guillermo García López (first round)
9. (Russia) Mikhail Youzhny (qualified)
10. (Brazil) Thomaz Bellucci (qualified)
11. (Ecuador) Nicolás Lapentti (first round)
12. (Germany) Mischa Zverev (qualified)
13. (Spain) Daniel Gimeno Traver (qualified)
14. (Chile) Nicolás Massú (qualifying competition)

=== Qualifiers ===
1. (Russia) Mikhail Youzhny
2. (Argentina) Juan Mónaco
3. (Spain) Daniel Gimeno Traver
4. (Czech Republic) Jan Hernych
5. (Romania) Victor Crivoi
6. (Brazil) Thomaz Bellucci
7. (Germany) Mischa Zverev

=== Qualifying draw ===
==== First qualifier ====
First round
1	(France) Arnaud Clément	6	3	6
(France) Adrian Mannarino	3	6	1
WC	(Italy) Gianluca Naso	4	3
9	(Russia) Mikhail Youzhny	6	6

Qualifying competition
1	(France) Arnaud Clément	3	3
9	(Russia) Mikhail Youzhny	6	6

==== Second qualifier ====
First round
2	(Argentina) Juan Mónaco	3	6	7
(Germany) Simon Greul	6	3	5
(Kazakhstan) Evgeny Korolev	6	6
8	(Spain) Guillermo García López	3	3

Qualifying competition
2	(Argentina) Juan Mónaco	6	6
(Kazakhstan) Evgeny Korolev	3	4

==== Third qualifier ====
First round
3	(Germany) Andreas Beck	6	6^{2}	6
(Spain) Alberto Martín	1	7^{7}	3
(Uzbekistan) Denis Istomin	5	6^{4}
13	(Spain) Daniel Gimeno Traver	7	7^{7}

Qualifying competition
3	(Germany) Andreas Beck	6	3	6^{5}
13	(Spain) Daniel Gimeno Traver	1	6	7^{7}

==== Fourth qualifier ====
First round
4	(Czech Republic) Jan Hernych	6	6
WC	(Italy) Antonio Comporto	3	0
WC	(Italy) Thomas Fabbiano	7^{7}	6^{6}	3
14	(Chile) Nicolás Massú	6^{5}	7^{8}	6

Qualifying competition
4	(Czech Republic) Jan Hernych	6	6
14	(Chile) Nicolás Massú	3	0

==== Fifth qualifier ====
First round
5	(Russia) Teymuraz Gabashvili	6	6
(France) Olivier Patience	3	2
(Romania) Victor Crivoi	6	6
11	(Ecuador) Nicolás Lapentti	3	4

Qualifying competition
5	(Russia) Teymuraz Gabashvili	5	4
(Romania) Victor Crivoi	7	6

==== Sixth qualifier ====
First round
6	(Spain) Óscar Hernández	6	6
(Spain) Pere Riba	3	2
(Kazakhstan) Andrey Golubev	4	4
10	(Brazil) Thomaz Bellucci	6	6

Qualifying competition
6	(Spain) Óscar Hernández	6	5	3
10	(Brazil) Thomaz Bellucci	2	7	6

==== Seventh qualifier ====
First round
7/WC	(Spain) Juan Carlos Ferrero	6	7^{7}
(Chile) Paul Capdeville	1	6^{5}
(Spain) Rubén Ramírez Hidalgo	2	3
12	(Germany) Mischa Zverev	6	6

Qualifying competition
7/WC	(Spain) Juan Carlos Ferrero	7^{9}	4	5
12	(Germany) Mischa Zverev	6^{7}	6	7
