= Greg Sharko =

Greg Sharko was the director of Media Relations and Information for the Association of Tennis Professionals (ATP) but he is perhaps best known for his statistical work, sometimes called the "staff guru" of the ATP. He has been nicknamed "Shark" and is considered a statistical and historical expert on men's professional tennis.

He lives in Ponte Vedra, Florida.

== Biography ==
Sharko has worked for the ATP since 1986. He writes a regular column, "Shark Bites", for the ATP's website in which he analyzes and writes about various statistics related to men's tennis; "Shark Bites" is also featured in the ATP's official magazine DEUCE, where it has appeared since the Spring 2005 issue.

Sharko has said that when he first joined the ATP, a lot of statistical categories and charts weren't yet developed; he helped develop statistical data in part to help create content for the annual ATP Media Guide. Sharko has written every ATP Media Guide since its creation in 1990. In July 2000 he was promoted to the ATP's Director of Communications in the Americas.

Journalists often refer to Sharko for help with statistics and issues of clarification, and journalist Peter Bodo has jokingly referred to Sharko as "the hands-down MVP of the ATP Tour (Roger, Rafa and Novak nonwithstanding)" Sports Illustrated writer L. Jon Wertheim has called Sharko "the Roger Federer of tennis research."

The International Tennis Writers Association honoured him with the Bud Collins Award for services to the media by people in tennis.
