= 2009 Mutua Madrileña Masters Madrid =

2009 Mutua Madrileña Madrid Open
- Date: 9–17 May
- Edition: 8th (men); 1st (women)
- Surface: Clay / outdoor
- Location: Madrid, Spain
- Venue: Park Manzanares

Champions

Men's singles
- (Switzerland) Roger Federer

Women's singles
- (Russia) Dinara Safina

Men's doubles
- (Canada) Daniel Nestor / (Serbia) Nenad Zimonjić

Women's doubles
- (Zimbabwe) Cara Black / (United States) Liezel Huber
- Madrid Open

The 2009 Madrid Open (also known as the Mutua Madrileña Madrid Open for sponsorship reasons) was a tennis tournament played on outdoor clay courts. It was the eighth edition of the Madrid Masters on the ATP and first on the WTA. It was classified as an ATP World Tour Masters 1000 event on the 2009 ATP World Tour and a Premier Mandatory event on the 2009 WTA Tour. Both the men's and the women's events took place at the Park Manzanares in Madrid, Spain from 9 May until 17 May 2009.

2009 was the first year that the Madrid Masters was played on clay rather than a hard-court surface, which replaced Hamburg Masters (for men) that was now downgraded into an ATP 500 tournament and Berlin (for women) which was now defunct.

Roger Federer and Dinara Safina won the singles titles.

== Finals ==
=== Men's singles ===
(Switzerland) Roger Federer defeated (Spain) Rafael Nadal 6–4, 6–4

- It was Federer's first title of the year and the 58th title of his career.

=== Women's singles ===
(Russia) Dinara Safina defeated (Denmark) Caroline Wozniacki 6–2, 6–4

- It was Safina's second title of the year and 11th of her career.

=== Men's doubles ===
(Canada) Daniel Nestor / (Serbia) Nenad Zimonjić defeated (Sweden) Simon Aspelin / (South Africa) Wesley Moodie 6–4, 6–4

=== Women's doubles ===
(Zimbabwe) Cara Black / (United States) Liezel Huber defeated (Czech Republic) Květa Peschke / (United States) Lisa Raymond 4–6, 6–3, 10–6

== ATP entrants ==
=== Seeds ===
Player	Country	Ranking*	Seeding
Rafael Nadal	Spain	1	1
Roger Federer	Switzerland	2	2
Novak Djokovic	Serbia	3	3
Andy Murray	United Kingdom	4	4
Juan Martín del Potro	Argentina	5	5
Andy Roddick	United States	6	6
Fernando Verdasco	Spain	7	7
Gilles Simon	France	8	8
Jo-Wilfried Tsonga	France	9	9
Nikolay Davydenko	Russia	11	10
Stanislas Wawrinka	Switzerland	13	11
David Ferrer	Spain	14	12
Marin Čilić	Croatia	15	13
James Blake	United States	16	14
Radek Štěpánek	Czech Republic	17	15
Tommy Robredo	Spain	18	16

- Seedings based on the May 4, 2009 rankings.

=== Other entrants ===
The following players received wildcards into the main draw:

- (Argentina) Juan Mónaco
- (Spain) Juan Carlos Ferrero
- (Spain) Óscar Hernández
- (Croatia) Ivan Ljubičić

The following players received entry from the qualifying draw:

- (Russia) Teymuraz Gabashvili
- (Argentina) Juan Ignacio Chela
- (Germany) Tommy Haas
- (Italy) Marco Crugnola
- (Argentina) Guillermo Cañas
- (Argentina) Eduardo Schwank
- (Italy) Fabio Fognini

The following players received entry into lucky losers:

- (Spain) Guillermo García López
- (Spain) Iván Navarro

== WTA entrants ==
=== Seeds ===
Player	Country	Ranking*	Seeding
Dinara Safina	Russia	1	1
Serena Williams	United States	2	2
Elena Dementieva	Russia	3	3
Jelena Janković	Serbia	4	4
Venus Williams	United States	5	5
Svetlana Kuznetsova	Russia	8	6
Victoria Azarenka	Belarus	9	7
Nadia Petrova	Russia	10	8
Caroline Wozniacki	Denmark	11	9
Agnieszka Radwańska	Poland	12	10
Marion Bartoli	France	13	11
Flavia Pennetta	Italy	14	12
Alizé Cornet	France	15	13
Anabel Medina Garrigues	Spain	16	14
Zheng Jie	China	17	15
Kaia Kanepi	Estonia	19	16

- Seedings based on the May 4, 2009 rankings.

=== Other entrants ===
The following players received wildcards into the main draw:

- (Spain) Virginia Ruano Pascual
- (Spain) Nuria Llagostera Vives
- (Spain) Lourdes Domínguez Lino
- (Spain) Sílvia Soler Espinosa

The following players received entry from the qualifying draw:

- (Italy) Roberta Vinci
- (Russia) Elena Vesnina
- (Colombia) Mariana Duque Marino
- (France) Aravane Rezaï
- (United States) Varvara Lepchenko
- (Uzbekistan) Akgul Amanmuradova
- (Russia) Vera Dushevina
- (Germany) Anna-Lena Grönefeld
