= 2009 Italian Open (tennis) =

- Date: 25 April – 4 May (men); 3–9 May (women)
- Edition: 66th
- Surface: Clay / outdoor
- Location: Rome, Italy
- Venue: Foro Italico

Champions

Men's singles
- (Spain) Rafael Nadal

Women's singles
- (Russia) Dinara Safina

Men's doubles
- (Canada) Daniel Nestor / (Serbia) Nenad Zimonjić

Women's doubles
- (Chinese Taipei) Hsieh Su-wei / (China) Peng Shuai
- Italian Open

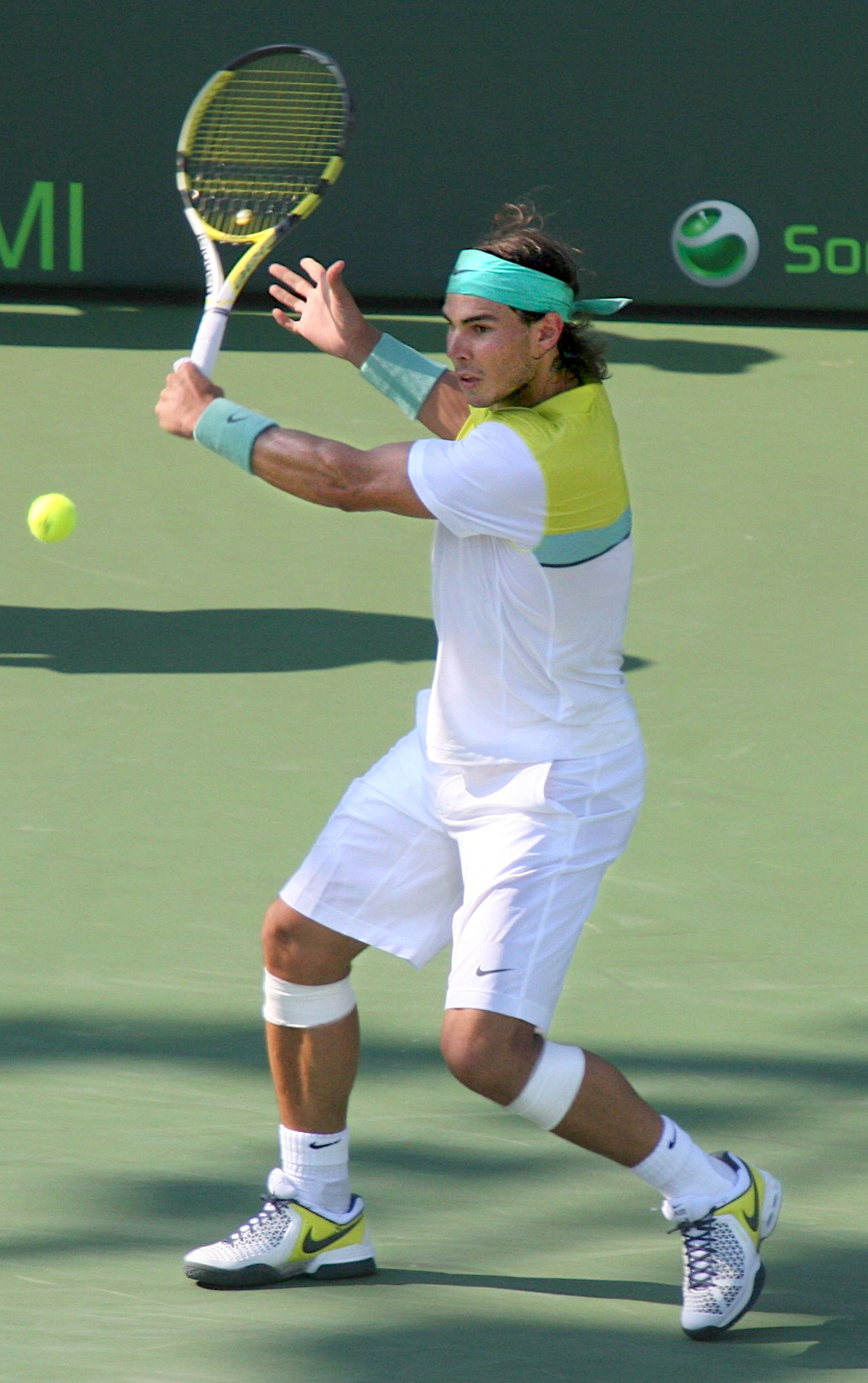
World No. 2 Rafael Nadal won his fourth singles title in Rome in five years

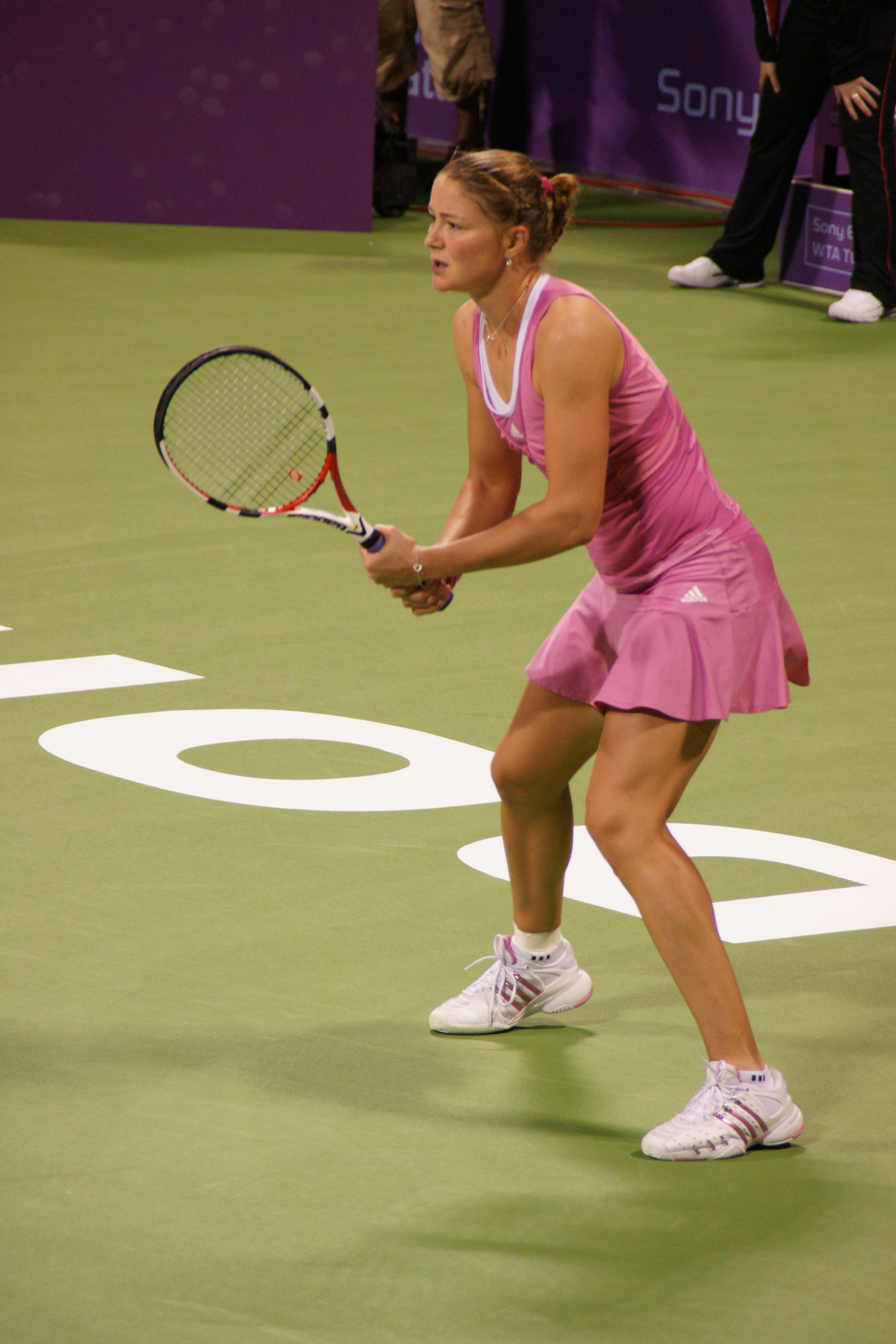
Women's singles champion and WTA No.1 Dinara Safina

The 2009 Italian Open (also known for 2009 Rome Masters and its sponsored title 2009 Internazionali BNL d'Italia) was a tennis tournament played on outdoor clay courts. It was the 66th edition, and was part of the ATP World Tour Masters 1000 of the 2009 ATP World Tour, and of the Premier-level tournaments of the 2009 WTA Tour. Both the men's and the women's events took place at the Foro Italico in Rome, Italy, with the men playing from April 25 through May 4, 2009, and the women from May 3 through May 9, 2009.

== Finals ==
=== Men's singles ===
(Spain) Rafael Nadal defeated (Serbia) Novak Djokovic 7–6^{(7–2)}, 6–2

- It was Nadal's 5th singles title of the year, and his 36th singles title overall. It was his 4th win at the event, also winning in 2005, 2006, and 2007.

=== Women's singles ===
(Russia) Dinara Safina defeated (Russia) Svetlana Kuznetsova, 6–3, 6–2

- It was Safina's first title of the year and 10th of her career.

=== Men's doubles ===
(Canada) Daniel Nestor / (Serbia) Nenad Zimonjić defeated (United States) Bob Bryan / (United States) Mike Bryan, 7–6^{(7–5)}, 6–3

=== Women's doubles ===
(Chinese Taipei) Hsieh Su-wei / (China) Peng Shuai defeated (Slovakia) Daniela Hantuchová / (Japan) Ai Sugiyama, 7–5, 7–6^{(7–5)}

== ATP entrants ==
=== Seeds ===
Player	Country	Ranking*	Seeding
Rafael Nadal	Spain	1	1
Roger Federer	Switzerland	2	2
Novak Djokovic	Serbia	3	3
Andy Murray	United Kingdom	4	4
Juan Martín del Potro	Argentina	5	5
Fernando Verdasco	Spain	7	6
Nikolay Davydenko	Russia	8	7
Gilles Simon	France	9	8
Jo-Wilfried Tsonga	France	11	9
Stanislas Wawrinka	Switzerland	12	10
David Ferrer	Spain	13	11
Fernando González	Chile	14	12
Tommy Robredo	Spain	16	13
James Blake	United States	17	14
Marin Čilić	Croatia	18	15
Radek Štěpánek	Czech Republic	19	16

- Seedings based on the April 20, 2009 rankings.

=== Other entrants ===
The following players received wildcards into the main draw:

- (Italy) Flavio Cipolla
- (Italy) Potito Starace
- (Italy) Fabio Fognini
- (Italy) Filippo Volandri

The following players received entry from the qualifying draw:

- (Russia) Mikhail Youzhny
- (Argentina) Juan Mónaco
- (Spain) Daniel Gimeno Traver
- (Czech Republic) Jan Hernych
- (Romania) Victor Crivoi
- (Brazil) Thomaz Bellucci
- (Germany) Mischa Zverev

== WTA entrants ==
=== Seeds ===
Player	Country	Ranking*	Seeding
Dinara Safina	Russia	1	1
Serena Williams	United States	2	2
Jelena Janković	Serbia	4	3
Venus Williams	United States	5	4
Ana Ivanovic	Serbia	7	5
Victoria Azarenka	Belarus	8	6
Svetlana Kuznetsova	Russia	9	7
Nadia Petrova	Russia	10	8
Caroline Wozniacki	Denmark	11	9
Agnieszka Radwańska	Poland	12	10
Marion Bartoli	France	13	11
Flavia Pennetta	Italy	14	12
Alizé Cornet	France	15	13
Zheng Jie	China	16	14
Anabel Medina Garrigues	Spain	18	15
Kaia Kanepi	Estonia	19	16

- Seedings based on the April 27, 2009 rankings.

=== Other entrants ===
The following players received wildcards into the main draw:

- (Italy) Roberta Vinci
- (Italy) Karin Knapp
- (Italy) Tathiana Garbin

The following players received entry from the qualifying draw:

- (Japan) Ayumi Morita
- (United States) Vania King
- (United States) Jill Craybas
- (Colombia) Mariana Duque Marino
- (France) Aravane Rezaï
- (Kazakhstan) Yaroslava Shvedova
- (Italy) Alberta Brianti
- (Ukraine) Mariya Koryttseva
