= 2009 Wimbledon Championships =

- Date: 22 June – 5 July
- Edition: 123rd
- Category: Grand Slam (ITF)
- Draw: 128S / 64D / 48XD
- Prize money: £12,550,000
- Surface: Grass
- Location: Church Road; SW19, Wimbledon, London, United Kingdom
- Venue: All England Lawn Tennis and Croquet Club
- Attendance: 511,043

Champions

Men's singles
- (Switzerland) Roger Federer

Women's singles
- (United States) Serena Williams

Men's doubles
- (Canada) Daniel Nestor / (Serbia) Nenad Zimonjić

Women's doubles
- (United States) Serena Williams / (United States) Venus Williams

Mixed doubles
- (The Bahamas) Mark Knowles / (Germany) Anna-Lena Grönefeld

Wheelchair men's doubles
- (France) Stéphane Houdet / (France) Michaël Jérémiasz

Wheelchair women's doubles
- (Netherlands) Korie Homan / (Netherlands) Esther Vergeer

Boys' singles
- (Russia) Andrey Kuznetsov

Girls' singles
- (Thailand) Noppawan Lertcheewakarn

Boys' doubles
- (France) Pierre-Hugues Herbert / (Germany) Kevin Krawietz

Girls' doubles
- (Thailand) Noppawan Lertcheewakarn / (Australia) Sally Peers

Gentlemen's invitation doubles
- (Netherlands) Jacco Eltingh / (Netherlands) Paul Haarhuis

Ladies' invitation doubles
- (United States) Martina Navratilova / (Czech Republic) Helena Suková

Senior gentlemen's invitation doubles
- (United Kingdom) Jeremy Bates / (Sweden) Anders Järryd
- Wimbledon Championships

The 2009 Wimbledon Championships was a tennis tournament played on grass courts at the All England Lawn Tennis and Croquet Club in Wimbledon, London in the United Kingdom. It was the 123rd edition of the Wimbledon Championships and was held from 22 June to 5 July 2009. It was the third Grand Slam tennis event of the year.

Rafael Nadal did not defend his title as he withdrew from the tournament due to knee tendonitis. Roger Federer won his 6th Wimbledon title, defeating rival Andy Roddick in the final in five sets. Federer's victory marked his fifteenth Grand Slam title, establishing a new men's all-time record at the time. Venus Williams was unsuccessful in her title defence, losing in the final match to her sister Serena, who won her first Wimbledon title since 2003.

Work to install a retractable roof on Centre Court had been completed, with the roof closed due to rain for the first time at the Championships in a fourth-round match between Dinara Safina and Amélie Mauresmo.

== Point and prize money distribution ==
=== Point distribution ===
Below are the tables with the point distribution for each discipline of the tournament.

==== Senior points ====
Event	W	F	SF	QF	Round of 16	Round of 32	Round of 64	Round of 128	Q	Q3	Q2	Q1
Men's singles	2000	1200	720	360	180	90	45	10	25	16	8	0
Men's doubles	2000	1200	720	360	180	90	0	—N/a	25	—N/a	0	0
Women's singles	2000	1400	900	500	280	160	100	5	60	50	40	2
Women's doubles	2000	1400	900	500	280	160	5	—N/a	48	—N/a	0	0

=== Prize distribution ===
The total prize money for 2009 championships was £12,550,000. The winner of the men's and women's singles title earned £850,000.

Event	W	F	SF	QF	Round of 16	Round of 32	Round of 64	Round of 128	Q3	Q2	Q1
Singles	£850,000	£425,000	£212,500	£106,250	£53,250	£29,250	£17,750	£10,750	£6,700	£3,350	£1,675
Doubles*	£230,000	£115,000	£57,500	£30,000	£16,000	£9,000	£5,250	—N/a	—N/a	—N/a	—N/a
Mixed doubles *	£92,000	£46,000	£23,000	£10,500	£5,200	£2,600	£1,300	—N/a	—N/a	—N/a	—N/a
Wheelchair doubles*	£6,750	£3,750	£2,250	£1,250	—N/a	—N/a	—N/a	—N/a	—N/a	—N/a	—N/a
Invitation doubles	£17,000	£14,000	£10,500	£9,500	£9,000	—N/a	—N/a	—N/a	—N/a	—N/a	—N/a

_{* per team}

== Champions ==
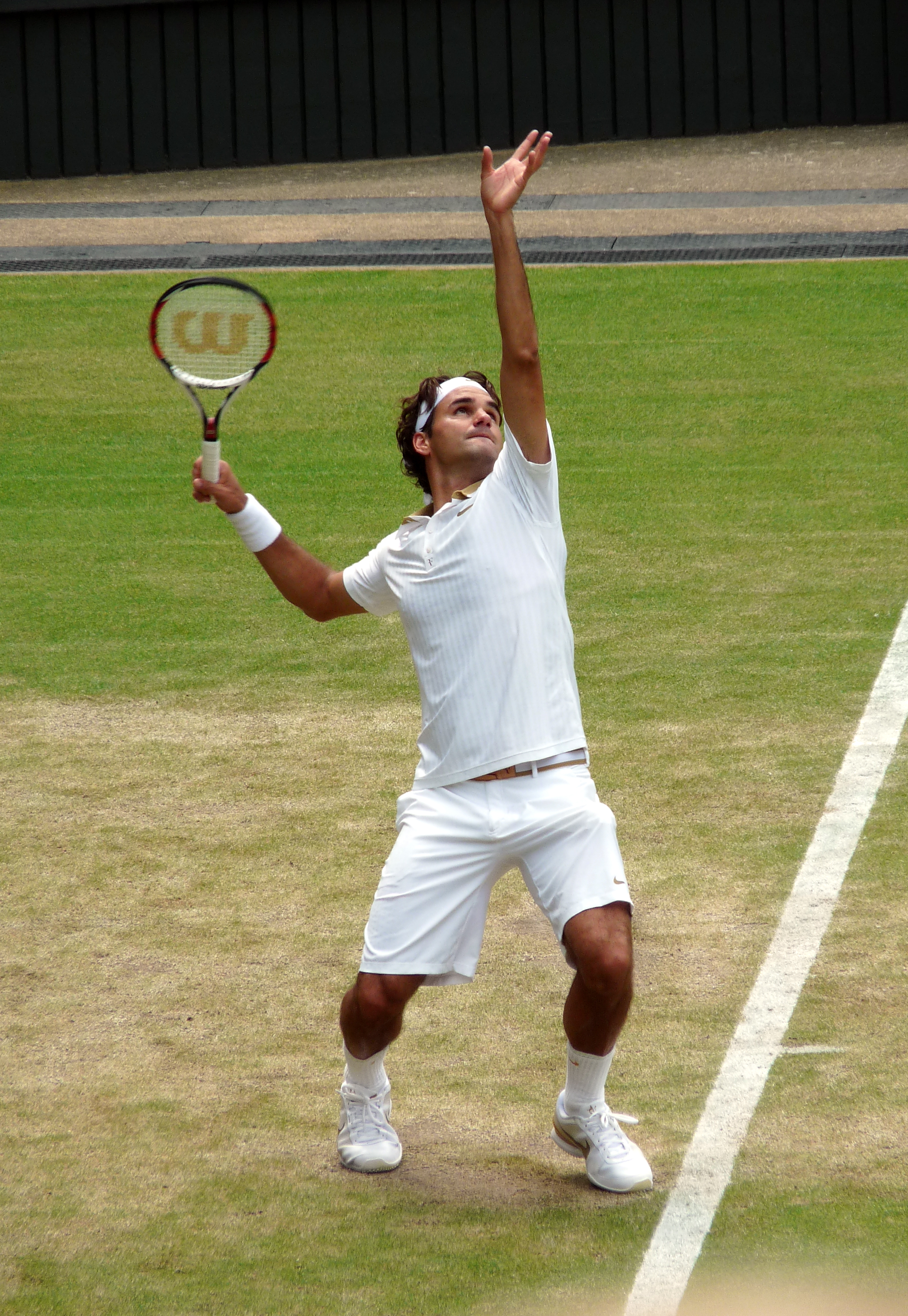
Roger Federer won his sixth Wimbledon crown to be just one shy of Pete Sampras's record of 7 Wimbledon titles, but did exceed his record of 14 grand slams with his 15th slam title.

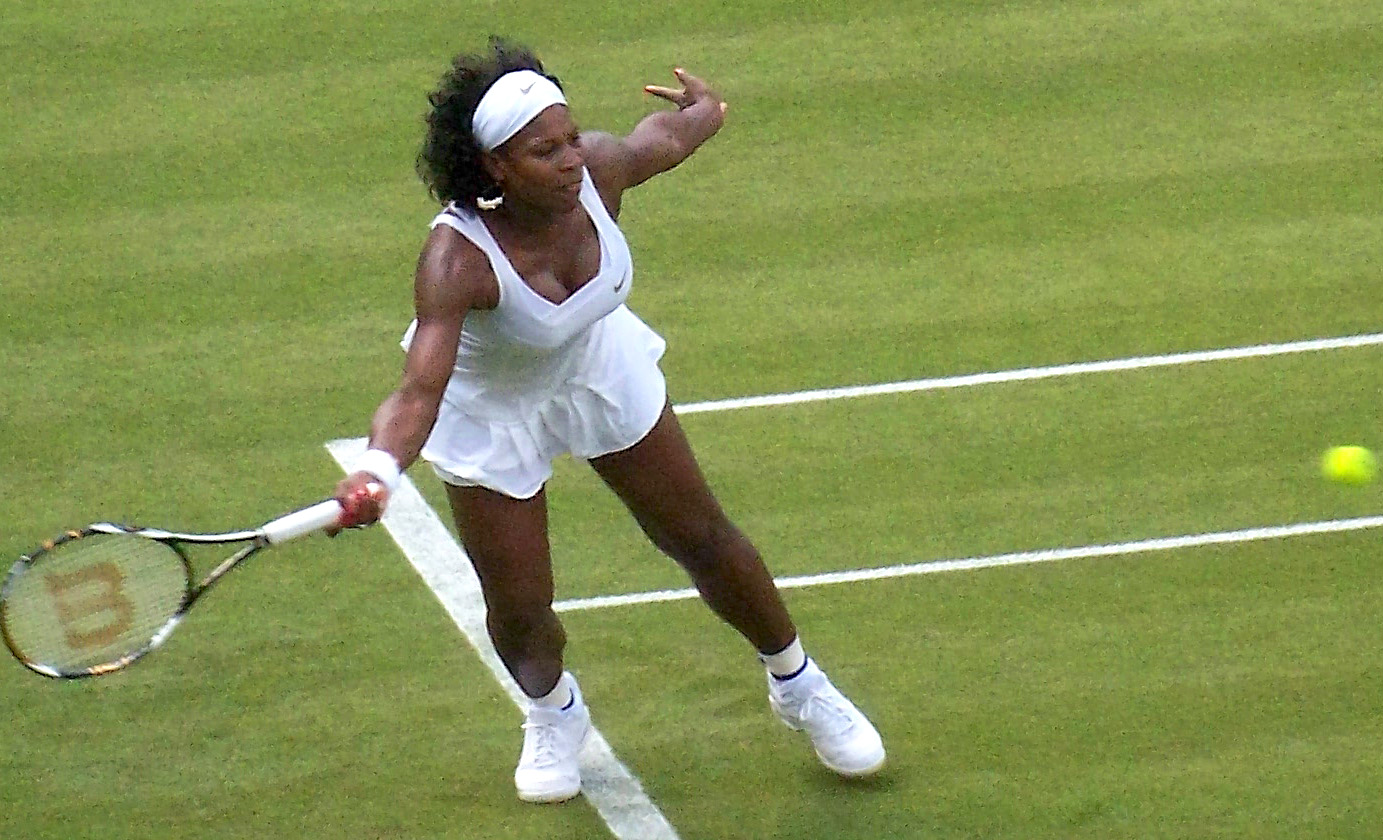
Serena Williams won her eleventh slam and her third Wimbledon title.

=== Seniors ===
==== Men's singles ====
(Switzerland) Roger Federer def. (United States) Andy Roddick, 5–7, 7–6^{(8–6)}, 7–6^{(7–5)}, 3–6, 16–14

- It was Federer's 3rd title of the year, and his 60th overall. Federer's victory gave him his 15th career Grand Slam title, to make him the most successful male player in Grand Slam history. Watching the Swiss break the record was Pete Sampras, who won 14 Grand Slam titles and was making his first return to Wimbledon since 2002; Björn Borg, who won five consecutive Wimbledon titles (the only other man doing this being Roger Federer himself); and Rod Laver, who won Wimbledon four times.
- The match set a record for most games in a men's final (77); the most games won by the losing player (39); and, most games won by the winning player (38).

==== Women's singles ====
(United States) Serena Williams def. (United States) Venus Williams, 7–6^{(7–3)}, 6–2

- It was Serena's 2nd title of the year, and her 34th overall. It was her 11th career Grand Slam title, and her 3rd Wimbledon title.

==== Men's doubles ====
(Canada) Daniel Nestor / (Serbia) Nenad Zimonjić def. (United States) Bob Bryan / (United States) Mike Bryan, 7–6^{(9–7)}, 6–7^{(3–7)}, 7–6^{(7–3)}, 6–3

==== Women's doubles ====
(United States) Serena Williams / (United States) Venus Williams def. (Australia) Samantha Stosur / (Australia) Rennae Stubbs, 7–6^{(7–4)}, 6–4

==== Mixed doubles ====
(The Bahamas) Mark Knowles / (Germany) Anna-Lena Grönefeld def. (India) Leander Paes / (Zimbabwe) Cara Black, 7–5, 6–3

=== Juniors ===
==== Boys' singles ====
(Russia) Andrey Kuznetsov def. (United States) Jordan Cox, 4–6, 6–2, 6–2

==== Girls' singles ====
(Thailand) Noppawan Lertcheewakarn def. (France) Kristina Mladenovic, 3–6, 6–3, 6–1

==== Boys' doubles ====
(France) Pierre-Hugues Herbert / (Germany) Kevin Krawietz def. (France) Julien Obry / (France) Adrien Puget, 6–7^{(3–7)}, 6–2, 12–10

==== Girls' doubles ====
(Thailand) Noppawan Lertcheewakarn / (Australia) Sally Peers def. (France) Kristina Mladenovic / (Croatia) Silvia Njirić, 6–1, 6–1

=== Invitation ===
==== Gentlemen's invitation doubles ====
(Netherlands) Jacco Eltingh / (Netherlands) Paul Haarhuis def. (United States) Donald Johnson / (United States) Jared Palmer, 7–6^{(7–2)}, 6–4

==== Ladies' invitation doubles ====
(United States) Martina Navratilova / (Czech Republic) Helena Suková def. (South Africa) Ilana Kloss / (United States) Rosalyn Nideffer, 6–3, 6–2

==== Senior gentlemen's invitation doubles ====
(United Kingdom) Jeremy Bates / (Sweden) Anders Järryd def. (Iran) Mansour Bahrami / (France) Henri Leconte, 6–4, 7–6^{(7–4)}

=== Wheelchair events ===
==== Wheelchair men's doubles ====
(France) Stéphane Houdet / (France) Michaël Jérémiasz def. (Netherlands) Robin Ammerlaan / (Japan) Shingo Kunieda, 1–6, 6–4, 7–6^{(7–3)}

==== Wheelchair women's doubles ====
(Netherlands) Korie Homan / (Netherlands) Esther Vergeer def. (Australia) Daniela Di Toro / (United Kingdom) Lucy Shuker, 6–1, 6–3

== Highlights ==
=== Records ===
Swiss Roger Federer established a number of records at the 2009 Wimbledon Championships. By defeating Ivo Karlović in the quarter-finals, Federer reached his 21st consecutive Grand Slam semi-final, having started the streak at Wimbledon in 2004. He then defeated Tommy Haas in the semi-final to reach his seventh consecutive Wimbledon final and his twentieth Grand Slam final, both of these all-time records. Finally, by defeating Andy Roddick in the final, Federer won his fifteenth Grand Slam title, breaking the record of fourteen titles previously set by Pete Sampras. Federer also became the fourth man to complete the rare French Open / Wimbledon double in the Open Era, joining Rod Laver, Björn Borg, and Rafael Nadal (who had completed the feat the previous year and would do so again in 2010).

Among other records set, the men's final between Federer and Roddick had the highest number of viewers in the UK of any Wimbledon final since 2001, peaking at 11.1 million viewers during the last stretch of the match. The 30-game fifth set in the men's final was the longest set in Wimbledon finals history.

=== Centre Court roof ===
The 2009 Championships took place during an extended period of hot, dry weather in southeast England, meaning that it was not until day seven of the tournament (29 June) that the newly constructed Centre Court roof was closed for the first time due to rain, delaying a fourth round match between Amélie Mauresmo and Dinara Safina. The roof had been partially closed in the first week, as a sunshade for the Royal Box. The following match between Andy Murray and Stan Wawrinka was the first full match to be played under the new roof; owing to the new floodlights, the match continued until 22:38, the latest ever finish in Wimbledon history (this record was broken in 2012 in a third round match between Andy Murray and Marcos Baghdatis, which ended at 23:02). These were the only two matches in which the Centre Court roof was used during the entire 2009 tournament.

=== Tennis Integrity Unit ===
The Tennis Integrity Unit (TIU) planned to observe matches played by up to 12 players (some of whom were inside the ATP top 50) throughout the tournament. The TIU has existed since January 2008.

The ATP claimed to have identified Russian and Italian Mafia-related groups behind suspicious betting at other tournaments, although the organisers of the Wimbledon Championships declared that there are no current proceedings against any players.

== Singles players ==
Men's singles

Champion		Runner-up	
(Switzerland) Roger Federer [2]		(United States) Andy Roddick [6]	
Semifinals out
(Germany) Tommy Haas [24]		(United Kingdom) Andy Murray [3]	
Quarterfinals out
(Australia) Lleyton Hewitt	(Spain) Juan Carlos Ferrero (WC)	(Serbia) Novak Djokovic [4]	(Croatia) Ivo Karlović [22]
4th round out
(Czech Republic) Radek Štěpánek [23]	(Czech Republic) Tomáš Berdych [20]	(Switzerland) Stan Wawrinka [19]	(France) Gilles Simon [8]
(Russia) Igor Andreev [29]	(Israel) Dudi Sela	(Spain) Fernando Verdasco [7]	(Sweden) Robin Söderling [13]
3rd round out
(Germany) Philipp Petzschner	(Spain) David Ferrer [16]	(Russia) Nikolay Davydenko [12]	(Austria) Jürgen Melzer [26]
(Serbia) Viktor Troicki [30]	(United States) Jesse Levine (Q)	(Chile) Fernando González [10]	(Romania) Victor Hănescu [31]
(Italy) Andreas Seppi	(Croatia) Marin Čilić [11]	(Spain) Tommy Robredo [15]	(United States) Mardy Fish [28]
(Spain) Albert Montañés [32]	(France) Jo-Wilfried Tsonga [9]	(Spain) Nicolás Almagro	(Germany) Philipp Kohlschreiber [27]
2nd round out
(Argentina) Juan Martín del Potro [5]	(Germany) Mischa Zverev	(Italy) Potito Starace	(Italy) Fabio Fognini
(Romania) Victor Crivoi	(France) Paul-Henri Mathieu	(Germany) Benjamin Becker	(Russia) Igor Kunitsyn
(Latvia) Ernests Gulbis	(Spain) Daniel Gimeno Traver	(Argentina) Martín Vassallo Argüello	(Uruguay) Pablo Cuevas (LL)
(Argentina) Leonardo Mayer	(France) Fabrice Santoro	(France) Nicolas Devilder	(Brazil) Thiago Alves (LL)
(France) Marc Gicquel	(United States) Vince Spadea	(France) Michaël Llodra	(United States) Sam Querrey
(Austria) Stefan Koubek (PR)	(Germany) Rainer Schüttler [18]	(Serbia) Janko Tipsarević	(Germany) Simon Greul (Q)
(Belgium) Kristof Vliegen	(Argentina) Guillermo Cañas	(Belgium) Steve Darcis	(Italy) Simone Bolelli
(Spain) Marcel Granollers	(Slovakia) Karol Beck	(Czech Republic) Ivo Minář	(Spain) Guillermo García López
1st round out
(France) Arnaud Clément	(United States) Robby Ginepri	(United States) Rajeev Ram (Q)	(Russia) Dmitry Tursunov [25]
(Colombia) Alejandro Falla (Q)	(Argentina) José Acasuso	(Uzbekistan) Denis Istomin	(United States) Kevin Kim
(United Kingdom) Dan Evans (WC)	(Germany) Björn Phau	(Portugal) Frederico Gil	(United Kingdom) Alex Bogdanovic (WC)
(United States) Wayne Odesnik	(Croatia) Roko Karanušić (Q)	(Bulgaria) Grigor Dimitrov (WC)	(France) Jérémy Chardy
(United States) Robert Kendrick	(Italy) Riccardo Ghedin (Q)	(United States) Taylor Dent (Q)	(Argentina) Brian Dabul
(Argentina) Eduardo Schwank	(Spain) Pablo Andújar	(Belgium) Christophe Rochus	(Russia) Marat Safin [14]
(Russia) Teymuraz Gabashvili	(Spain) Óscar Hernández	(Russia) Mikhail Youzhny	(Germany) Nicolas Kiefer [33]
(Spain) Iván Navarro	(Ecuador) Nicolás Lapentti	(Romania) Andrei Pavel (PR)	(United States) Bobby Reynolds
(United States) James Blake [17]	(France) Adrian Mannarino (Q)	(Chile) Paul Capdeville	(Russia) Evgeny Korolev
(Austria) Alexander Peya (Q)	(United Kingdom) Josh Goodall (WC)	(Thailand) Danai Udomchoke (LL)	(Spain) Alberto Martín
(Slovenia) Luka Gregorc (Q)	(France) Édouard Roger-Vasselin (Q)	(Mexico) Santiago González (Q)	(Belgium) Xavier Malisse (Q)
(Argentina) Sergio Roitman	(Czech Republic) Jan Hernych	(United States) Michael Yani (Q)	(France) Julien Benneteau
(United Kingdom) James Ward (WC)	(France) Nicolas Mahut (WC)	(Argentina) Diego Junqueira	(Slovenia) Grega Žemlja (Q)
(Slovakia) Lukáš Lacko (Q)	(Canada) Frank Dancevic	(Austria) Daniel Köllerer	(Kazakhstan) Andrey Golubev
(Luxembourg) Gilles Müller	(Germany) Andreas Beck (LL)	(Argentina) Juan Mónaco	(Spain) Feliciano López [21]
(France) Florent Serra	(Argentina) Máximo González	(Argentina) Agustín Calleri	(Chinese Taipei) Lu Yen-hsun

Women's singles

Champion		Runner-up	
(United States) Serena Williams [2]		(United States) Venus Williams [3]	
Semifinals out
(Russia) Elena Dementieva [4]		(Russia) Dinara Safina [1]	
Quarterfinals out
(Germany) Sabine Lisicki	(Poland) Agnieszka Radwańska [11]	(Italy) Francesca Schiavone	(Belarus) Victoria Azarenka [8]
4th round out
(France) Amélie Mauresmo [17]	(Denmark) Caroline Wozniacki [9]	(Serbia) Ana Ivanovic [13]	(United States) Melanie Oudin (Q)
(France) Virginie Razzano [26]	(Russia) Elena Vesnina	(Russia) Nadia Petrova [10]	(Slovakia) Daniela Hantuchová
3rd round out
(Belgium) Kirsten Flipkens	(Italy) Flavia Pennetta [15]	(Spain) Anabel Medina Garrigues [20]	(Russia) Svetlana Kuznetsova [5]
(Spain) Carla Suárez Navarro	(Australia) Samantha Stosur [18]	(China) Li Na [19]	(Serbia) Jelena Janković [6]
(Russia) Vera Zvonareva [7]	(France) Marion Bartoli [12]	(Slovakia) Dominika Cibulková [14]	(Russia) Regina Kulikova (Q)
(Romania) Sorana Cîrstea [28]	(Argentina) Gisela Dulko	(Japan) Ai Sugiyama	(Italy) Roberta Vinci
2nd round out
(Paraguay) Rossana de los Ríos	(United Kingdom) Elena Baltacha (WC)	(Slovakia) Kristína Kučová (LL)	(United States) Vania King
(Russia) Maria Kirilenko	(Italy) Tathiana Garbin	(Austria) Patricia Mayr	(France) Pauline Parmentier
(Ukraine) Kateryna Bondarenko	(Russia) Ekaterina Makarova	(Germany) Tatjana Malek (Q)	(Italy) Sara Errani
(China) Peng Shuai	(Belarus) Olga Govortsova	(Kazakhstan) Yaroslava Shvedova	(Czech Republic) Iveta Benešová
(France) Mathilde Johansson	(United States) Jill Craybas	(Portugal) Michelle Larcher de Brito (WC)	(Switzerland) Timea Bacsinszky
(Poland) Urszula Radwańska	(Russia) Vera Dushevina	(Russia) Alisa Kleybanova [27]	(France) Aravane Rezaï
(Romania) Raluca Olaru	(India) Sania Mirza	(Russia) Maria Sharapova [24]	(Israel) Shahar Pe'er
(China) Zheng Jie [16]	(Spain) Arantxa Parra Santonja (Q)	(Russia) Anastasia Pavlyuchenkova [31]	(Australia) Jarmila Groth
1st round out
(Spain) Lourdes Domínguez Lino	(Czech Republic) Nicole Vaidišová	(Ukraine) Alona Bondarenko	(Hungary) Ágnes Szávay [30]
(Hungary) Melinda Czink	(Japan) Aiko Nakamura (Q)	(Ukraine) Mariya Koryttseva	(Spain) Nuria Llagostera Vives
(Japan) Kimiko Date-Krumm (WC)	(Czech Republic) Petra Kvitová	(Italy) Alberta Brianti (Q)	(Poland) Marta Domachowska
(Russia) Anna Chakvetadze [32]	(United Kingdom) Anne Keothavong	(Uzbekistan) Akgul Amanmuradova	(Japan) Akiko Morigami (PR)
(Switzerland) Stefanie Vögele	(Latvia) Anastasija Sevastova (Q)	(Czech Republic) Barbora Záhlavová-Strýcová	(Estonia) Kaia Kanepi [25]
(United States) Bethanie Mattek-Sands	(Australia) Jelena Dokic	(Canada) Stéphanie Dubois	(Czech Republic) Lucie Hradecká
(Spain) María José Martínez Sánchez	(United States) Alexa Glatch (WC)	(Ukraine) Tatiana Perebiynis (PR)	(Kazakhstan) Galina Voskoboeva
(Austria) Sybille Bammer [29]	(Romania) Monica Niculescu	(United Kingdom) Katie O'Brien (WC)	(Germany) Julia Görges
(United Kingdom) Georgie Stoop (WC)	(United Kingdom) Melanie South (WC)	(Bulgaria) Tsvetana Pironkova	(Austria) Tamira Paszek
(Canada) Aleksandra Wozniak [23]	(Czech Republic) Klára Zakopalová (Q)	(Russia) Vesna Manasieva (Q)	(Chinese Taipei) Chan Yung-jan
(France) Julie Coin	(Slovenia) Maša Zec Peškirič	(Belgium) Yanina Wickmayer	(France) Alizé Cornet
(Kazakhstan) Sesil Karatantcheva (Q)	(Croatia) Karolina Šprem	(Japan) Ayumi Morita	(Russia) Alla Kudryavtseva
(France) Séverine Brémond Beltrame	(France) Nathalie Dechy	(Germany) Anna-Lena Grönefeld	(Romania) Edina Gallovits
(Ukraine) Viktoriya Kutuzova (Q)	(France) Stéphanie Foretz	(Italy) Maria Elena Camerin	(Belarus) Anastasiya Yakimova
(Germany) Kristina Barrois	(United Kingdom) Laura Robson (WC)	(Thailand) Tamarine Tanasugarn	(Switzerland) Patty Schnyder [21]
(Czech Republic) Petra Cetkovská	(Slovakia) Magdaléna Rybáriková	(Czech Republic) Lucie Šafářová	(Portugal) Neuza Silva (Q)

== Singles seeds ==
The following are the seeded players and notable players who withdrew from the event. Seedings based on ATP and WTA rankings as of 15 June 2009. Rankings and points before are as of 22 June 2009.

=== Men's singles ===
The Men's singles seeds is arranged on a surface-based system to reflect more accurately the individual player's grass court achievement as per the following formula:

- ESP points as at a week of 22 June 2009
- Add 100% points earned for all grass court tournaments in the past 12 months (23 June 2008 – 21 June 2009)
- add 75% points earned for best grass court tournament in the 12 months before that (25 June 2007 – 22 June 2008).

Seed	Rank	Player	Points before	Points defending	Points won	Points after	Status
~~1~~	~~1~~	~~(Spain) Rafael Nadal~~	12,735	2,000	0	10,735	Withdrew due to a knee injury
2	2	(Switzerland) Roger Federer	10,620	1,400	2,000	11,220	Champion, defeated (United States) Andy Roddick [5]
3	3	(United Kingdom) Andy Murray	9,230	500	720	9,450	Semifinals lost to (United States) Andy Roddick [5]
4	4	(Serbia) Novak Djokovic	7,860	70	360	8,150	Quarterfinals lost to (Germany) Tommy Haas [24]
5	5	(Argentina) Juan Martín del Potro	5,730	70	45	5,705	Second round lost to (Australia) Lleyton Hewitt
6	6	(United States) Andy Roddick	4,310	70	1,200	5,440	Runner-up, lost to (Switzerland) Roger Federer [2]
7	8	(Spain) Fernando Verdasco	3,620	300	180	3,500	Fourth round lost to (Croatia) Ivo Karlović [22]
8	7	(France) Gilles Simon	3,970	150	180	4,000	Fourth round lost to (Spain) Juan Carlos Ferrero [WC]
9	9	(France) Jo-Wilfried Tsonga	3,510	0	90	3,600	Third round lost to (Croatia) Ivo Karlović [22]
10	10	(Chile) Fernando González	3,165	70	90	3,185	Third round lost to (Spain) Juan Carlos Ferrero [WC]
11	13	(Croatia) Marin Čilić	2,710	300	90	2,500	Third round lost to (Germany) Tommy Haas [24]
12	11	(Russia) Nikolay Davydenko	2,855	10	90	2,935	Third round lost to (Czech Republic) Tomáš Berdych [20]
13	12	(Sweden) Robin Söderling	2,825	70	180	2,935	Fourth round lost to (Switzerland) Roger Federer [2]
14	24	(Russia) Marat Safin	1,820	900	10	930	First round lost to (United States) Jesse Levine
15	15	(Spain) Tommy Robredo	2,580	70	90	2,600	Third round lost to (Israel) Dudi Sela
16	21	(Spain) David Ferrer	1,900	150	90	1,840	Third round lost to (Czech Republic) Radek Štěpánek [23]
17	17	(United States) James Blake	2,340	70	10	2,280	First round lost to (Italy) Andreas Seppi
18	29	(Germany) Rainer Schüttler	1,645	900	45	790	Second round lost to (Israel) Dudi Sela
19	18	(Switzerland) Stan Wawrinka	2,195	300	180	2,075	Fourth round lost to (United Kingdom) Andy Murray [3]
20	20	(Czech Republic) Tomáš Berdych	1,910	150	180	1,940	Fourth round lost to (United States) Andy Roddick [6]
21	27	(Spain) Feliciano López	1,665	500	10	1,165	First round lost to (Slovakia) Karol Beck [LL]
22	36	(Croatia) Ivo Karlović	1,295	10	360	1,645	Quarterfinals lost to (Switzerland) Roger Federer [2]
23	23	(Czech Republic) Radek Štěpánek	1,890	150	180	3,500	Fourth round lost to (Australia) Lleyton Hewitt
24	34	(Germany) Tommy Haas	1,405	150	720	2,020	Semifinals lost to (Switzerland) Roger Federer [2]
25	22	(Russia) Dmitry Tursunov	1,900	150	10	1,760	First round lost to (Germany) Mischa Zverev
26	30	(Austria) Jürgen Melzer	1,640	150	90	1,580	Third round lost to (United States) Andy Roddick [6]
27	32	(Germany) Philipp Kohlschreiber	1,540	10	90	1,620	Third round lost to (Switzerland) Roger Federer [2]
28	25	(United States) Mardy Fish	1,735	10	90	1,815	Third round lost to (Serbia) Novak Djokovic [4]
29	26	(Russia) Igor Andreev	1,700	70	180	1,810	Fourth round lost to (Germany) Tommy Haas [24]
30	31	(Serbia) Viktor Troicki	1,547	70	90	1,567	Third round lost to (United Kingdom) Andy Murray [3]
31	28	(Romania) Victor Hănescu	1,651	70	90	1,671	Third round lost to (France) Gilles Simon [8]
32	33	(Spain) Albert Montañés	1,424	70	90	1,444	Third round lost to (Spain) Fernando Verdasco [7]
33	35	(Germany) Nicolas Kiefer	1,315	150	10	1,175	First round lost to (France) Fabrice Santoro

The following players would have been seeded, but they withdrew from the event.

Rank	Player	Points before	Points defending	Points after	Withdrawal reason
14	(France) Gaël Monfils	2,610	0	2,610	Wrist injury
16	(Argentina) David Nalbandian	2,385	10	2,375	Hip injury
19	(France) Richard Gasquet	1,925	300	1,625	Provisional suspension

=== Women's singles ===
The seeds for ladies' singles are based on the WTA rankings as of 15 June 2009, with an exception for Maria Sharapova (details are given below). Rank and points before are as of 22 June 2009.

Seed	Rank	Player	Points before	Points defending	Points won	Points after	Status
1	1	(Russia) Dinara Safina	9,801	180	900	10,521	Semifinals lost to (United States) Venus Williams [3]
2	2	(United States) Serena Williams	8,158	1,400	2,000	8,758	Champion, defeated (United States) Venus Williams [3]
3	3	(United States) Venus Williams	7,217	2,000	1,400	6,617	Runner-up, lost to (United States) Serena Williams [2]
4	4	(Russia) Elena Dementieva	6,591	900	900	6,591	Semifinals lost to (United States) Serena Williams [2]
5	5	(Russia) Svetlana Kuznetsova	6,191	280	160	6,071	Third round lost to (Germany) Sabine Lisicki
6	6	(Serbia) Jelena Janković	6,100	280	160	5,980	Third round lost to (United States) Melanie Oudin [Q]
7	7	(Russia) Vera Zvonareva	5,360	120	160	5,400	Third round withdrew due to ankle injury
8	8	(Belarus) Victoria Azarenka	4,946	180	500	5,066	Quarterfinals lost to (United States) Serena Williams [2]
9	9	(Denmark) Caroline Wozniacki	4,680	180	280	4,780	Fourth round lost to (Germany) Sabine Lisicki
10	10	(Russia) Nadia Petrova	3,520	500	280	3,300	Fourth round lost to (Belarus) Victoria Azarenka [8]
11	14	(Poland) Agnieszka Radwańska	2,981	500	500	2,981	Quarterfinals lost to (United States) Venus Williams [3]
12	11	(France) Marion Bartoli	3,235	180	160	3,215	Third round lost to (Italy) Francesca Schiavone
13	12	(Serbia) Ana Ivanovic	3,172	180	280	3,272	Fourth round retired against (United States) Venus Williams [3]
14	13	(Slovakia) Dominika Cibulková	3,065	4	160	3,221	Third round lost to (Russia) Elena Vesnina
15	15	(Italy) Flavia Pennetta	2,860	120	160	2,900	Third round lost to (France) Amélie Mauresmo [17]
16	16	(China) Zheng Jie	2,661	900	100	1,861	Second round lost to (Slovakia) Daniela Hantuchová
17	17	(France) Amélie Mauresmo	2,539	180	280	2,639	Fourth round lost to (Russia) Dinara Safina [1]
18	19	(Australia) Samantha Stosur	2,212	120	160	2,252	Third round lost to (Serbia) Ana Ivanovic [13]
19	18	(China) Li Na	2,302	120	160	6,591	Third round lost to (Poland) Agnieszka Radwańska [11]
20	20	(Spain) Anabel Medina Garrigues	2,200	180	160	2,180	Third round lost to (Denmark) Caroline Wozniacki [9]
21	22	(Switzerland) Patty Schnyder	2,112	4	10	2,118	First round lost to (Japan) Ai Sugiyama
22	24	(France) Alizé Cornet	1,960	4	10	1,966	First round lost to (Russia) Vera Dushevina
23	21	(Canada) Aleksandra Wozniak	2,114	120	10	2,004	First round lost to (Italy) Francesca Schiavone
24^{†}	60	(Russia) Maria Sharapova	990	120	100	970	Second round lost to (Argentina) Gisela Dulko
25	25	(Estonia) Kaia Kanepi	1,860	4	10	1,866	First round lost to (Spain) Carla Suárez Navarro
26	23	(France) Virginie Razzano	2,089	4	280	2,365	Fourth round lost to (Italy) Francesca Schiavone
27	31	(Russia) Alisa Kleybanova	1,665	280	100	1,485	Second round lost to (Russia) Regina Kulikova [Q]
28	27	(Romania) Sorana Cîrstea	1,756	120	160	1,796	Third round lost to (Belarus) Victoria Azarenka [8]
29	26	(Austria) Sybille Bammer	1,775	120	10	1,665	First round lost to (United States) Melanie Oudin [Q]
30	28	(Hungary) Ágnes Szávay	1,749	280	10	1,479	First round lost to (Belgium) Kirsten Flipkens
31	29	(Russia) Anastasia Pavlyuchenkova	1,708	242	120	1,566	Second round lost to (Italy) Roberta Vinci
32	30	(Russia) Anna Chakvetadze	1,681	280	10	1,411	First round lost to (Germany) Sabine Lisicki

† Maria Sharapova was ranked 59th on the day seeds were announced, because she had missed the most of 12-month period due to injury. Nevertheless, she was deemed a special case and was seeded 24th by organizers.

== Wild card entries ==
=== Main draw wild card entries ===
The following players received wild cards into the main draw senior events.

Men's singles

1. (United Kingdom) Alex Bogdanovic
2. (Bulgaria) Grigor Dimitrov
3. (United Kingdom) Dan Evans
4. (Spain) Juan Carlos Ferrero
5. (United Kingdom) Josh Goodall
6. (France) Nicolas Mahut
7. (United Kingdom) James Ward

Women's singles

1. (United Kingdom) Elena Baltacha
2. (Japan) Kimiko Date-Krumm
3. (United States) Alexa Glatch
4. (Portugal) Michelle Larcher de Brito
5. (United Kingdom) Katie O'Brien
6. (United Kingdom) Laura Robson
7. (United Kingdom) Melanie South
8. (United Kingdom) Georgie Stoop

Men's doubles

1. (United Kingdom) James Auckland / (United Kingdom) Josh Goodall
2. (United Kingdom) Alex Bogdanovic / (United Kingdom) James Ward
3. (United Kingdom) Jamie Delgado / (United Kingdom) Jonathan Marray
4. (United Kingdom) Colin Fleming / (United Kingdom) Ken Skupski
5. ~~(France) Michaël Llodra~~ / ~~(France) Nicolas Mahut~~ (Withdrew)

Women's doubles

1. (United Kingdom) Elena Baltacha / (United Kingdom) Amanda Elliott
2. (United Kingdom) Jade Curtis / (United Kingdom) Anna Smith
3. (United Kingdom) Laura Robson / (United Kingdom) Georgie Stoop
4. (United Kingdom) Jocelyn Rae / (United Kingdom) Melanie South
5. (United Kingdom) Naomi Cavaday / (United Kingdom) Katie O'Brien

Mixed doubles

1. (United Kingdom) James Auckland / (United Kingdom) Elena Baltacha
2. (United Kingdom) Alex Bogdanovic / (United Kingdom) Melanie South
3. (United Kingdom) Colin Fleming / (United Kingdom) Sarah Borwell
4. (United Kingdom) Josh Goodall / (United Kingdom) Naomi Cavaday
5. (United Kingdom) Ken Skupski / (United Kingdom) Katie O'Brien

== Main draw qualifier entries ==
Below are the lists of the qualifiers entering in the main draws.

=== Men's singles ===
Men's singles qualifiers

1. (United States) Rajeev Ram
2. (Germany) Simon Greul
3. (Belgium) Xavier Malisse
4. (Croatia) Roko Karanušić
5. (Slovakia) Lukáš Lacko
6. (Austria) Alexander Peya
7. (Colombia) Alejandro Falla
8. (France) Édouard Roger-Vasselin
9. (Slovenia) Grega Žemlja
10. (Mexico) Santiago González
11. (United States) Taylor Dent
12. (Italy) Riccardo Ghedin
13. (France) Adrian Mannarino
14. (Slovenia) Luka Gregorc
15. (United States) Michael Yani
16. (United States) Jesse Levine

Lucky Losers

1. (Slovakia) Karol Beck
2. (Brazil) Thiago Alves
3. (Thailand) Danai Udomchoke
4. (Uruguay) Pablo Cuevas

=== Women's singles ===
Women's singles qualifiers

1. (Ukraine) Viktoriya Kutuzova
2. (Czech Republic) Klára Zakopalová
3. (Germany) Tatjana Malek
4. (Japan) Aiko Nakamura
5. (Spain) Arantxa Parra Santonja
6. (Kazakhstan) Sesil Karatantcheva
7. (Russia) Regina Kulikova
8. (United States) Melanie Oudin
9. (Italy) Alberta Brianti
10. (Portugal) Neuza Silva
11. (Russia) Vesna Manasieva
12. (Latvia) Anastasija Sevastova

Lucky Losers

1. (Slovakia) Kristína Kučová

=== Men's doubles ===
Men's doubles qualifiers

1. (United Kingdom) Chris Eaton / (United Kingdom) Alexander Slabinsky
2. (Mexico) Santiago González / (United States) Travis Rettenmaier
3. (South Africa) Kevin Anderson / (India) Somdev Devvarman
4. (India) Prakash Amritraj / (Pakistan) Aisam-ul-Haq Qureshi

Lucky Losers

1. (Australia) Rameez Junaid / (Germany) Philipp Marx
2. (United States) David Martin / (Switzerland) Jean-Claude Scherrer
3. (Italy) Alessandro Motti / (Australia) Joseph Sirianni
4. (Thailand) Sanchai Ratiwatana / (Thailand) Sonchat Ratiwatana
5. (Slovakia) Karol Beck / (Czech Republic) Jaroslav Levinský
6. (Australia) Chris Guccione / (Germany) Frank Moser

=== Women's doubles ===
Women's doubles qualifiers

1. (Germany) Tatjana Malek / (Germany) Andrea Petkovic
2. (Japan) Rika Fujiwara / (Japan) Aiko Nakamura
3. (Romania) Edina Gallovits / (Hungary) Katalin Marosi
4. (Ukraine) Yuliana Fedak / (Bosnia and Herzegovina) Mervana Jugić-Salkić

== Protected ranking ==
The following players were accepted directly into the main draw using a protected ranking:

Men's singles

- (Austria) Stefan Koubek
- (Romania) Andrei Pavel

Women's singles

- (Japan) Akiko Morigami
- (Ukraine) Tatiana Perebiynis

== Withdrawals ==
Men's singles

- (Croatia) Mario Ančić → replaced by (Canada) Frank Dancevic
- (Cyprus) Marcos Baghdatis → replaced by (Slovakia) Karol Beck
- (France) Richard Gasquet → replaced by (Germany) Benjamin Becker
- (Croatia) Ivan Ljubičić → replaced by (Thailand) Danai Udomchoke
- (France) Gaël Monfils → replaced by (Uruguay) Pablo Cuevas
- (Spain) Carlos Moyá → replaced by (United States) Vince Spadea
- (Spain) Rafael Nadal → replaced by (Brazil) Thiago Alves
- (Argentina) David Nalbandian → replaced by (Argentina) Brian Dabul
- (Finland) Jarkko Nieminen → replaced by (Ecuador) Nicolás Lapentti

Women's singles

- (New Zealand) Marina Erakovic → replaced by (Canada) Stéphanie Dubois
- (United States) Laura Granville → replaced by (Slovenia) Maša Zec Peškirič
- (United States) Meghann Shaughnessy → replaced by (Romania) Raluca Olaru
- (Slovenia) Katarina Srebotnik → replaced by (Slovakia) Kristína Kučová

Preceded by 2009 French Open	Grand Slams	Succeeded by 2009 US Open
