= 2001 Davidoff Swiss Indoors =

- Date: 22–28 October
- Edition: 32nd
- Category: International Series
- Draw: 32S / 16D
- Prize money: $975,000
- Surface: Carpet / indoor
- Location: Basel, Switzerland
- Venue: St. Jakobshalle

Champions

Singles
- (United Kingdom) Tim Henman

Doubles
- (South Africa) Ellis Ferreira / (United States) Rick Leach
← 2000 ·	Swiss Indoors	· 2002 →

The 2001 Davidoff Swiss Indoors was a men's tennis tournament played on indoor carpet courts at the St. Jakobshalle in Basel in Switzerland and was part of the International Series of the 2001 ATP Tour. The tournament ran from 22 October through 28 October 2001. Second-seeded Tim Henman won the singles title.

== Finals ==
=== Singles ===
(United Kingdom) Tim Henman defeated (Switzerland) Roger Federer 6–3, 6–4, 6–2

- It was Henman's 2nd title of the year and the 11th of his career.

=== Doubles ===
(South Africa) Ellis Ferreira / (United States) Rick Leach defeated (India) Mahesh Bhupathi / (India) Leander Paes 7–6^{(7–3)}, 6–4

- It was Ferreira's 1st title of the year and the 16th of his career. It was Leach's 2nd title of the year and the 42nd of his career.
