= 1999 Davidoff Swiss Indoors =

- Date: 3 – 10 October
- Edition: 30th
- Category: World Series
- Draw: 32S / 16D
- Prize money: $975,000
- Surface: Carpet / indoor
- Location: Basel, Switzerland
- Venue: St. Jakobshalle

Champions

Singles
- (Slovakia) Karol Kučera

Doubles
- (South Africa) Brent Haygarth / (North Macedonia) Aleksandar Kitinov
← 1998 ·	Swiss Indoors	· 2000 →

The 1999 Davidoff Swiss Indoors was a men's tennis tournament played on indoor carpet courts. It was the 30th edition of the event known that year as the Davidoff Swiss Indoors, and was part of the World of the 1999 ATP Tour. It took place at the St. Jakobshalle in Basel, Switzerland, from 3 October through 10 October 1999. Unseeded Karol Kučera won the singles title.

== Finals ==
=== Singles ===
(Slovakia) Karol Kučera defeated (United Kingdom) Tim Henman 6–4, 7–6^{(12–10)}, 4–6, 4–6, 7–6^{(7–2)}

- It was Kučera's 1st title of the year and the 5th of his career.

=== Doubles ===
(South Africa) Brent Haygarth / (North Macedonia) Aleksandar Kitinov defeated (Czech Republic) Jiří Novák / (Czech Republic) David Rikl, 0–6, 6–4, 7–5

- It was Haygarth's 1st title of the year and the 6th of his career. It was Kitinov's 1st title of the year and the 2nd of his career.
