= Federer–Roddick rivalry =

Tennis rivalry

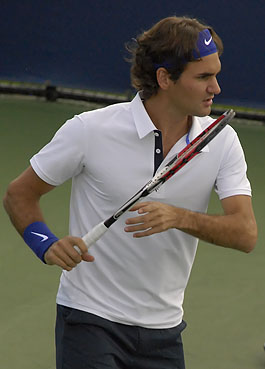
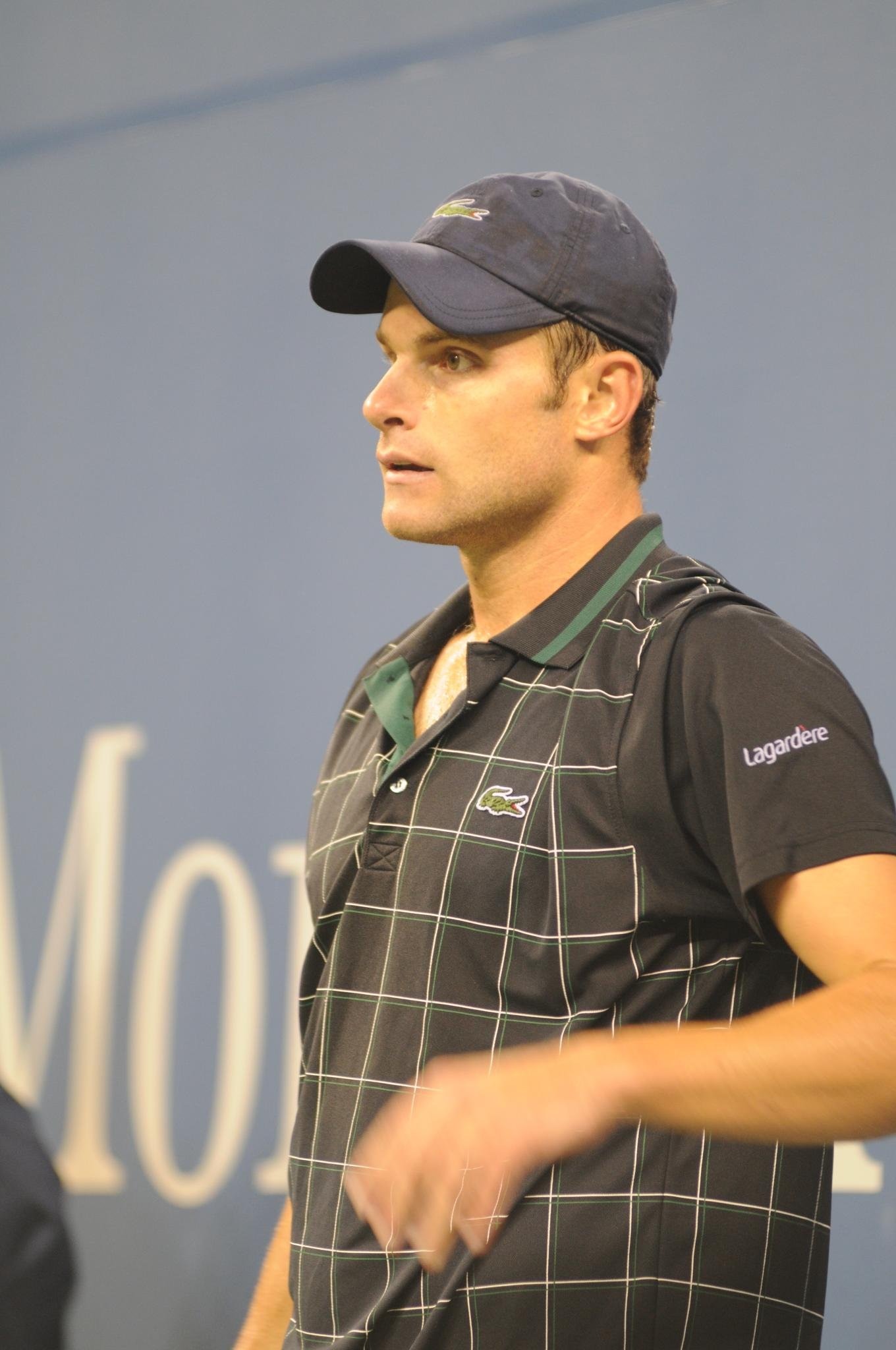
Roger Federer and Andy Roddick

The Federer–Roddick rivalry was a tennis rivalry between Roger Federer and Andy Roddick. The two met 24 times in official Association of Tennis Professionals (ATP) matches, and Federer led 21–3. Although heavily lopsided in favor of Federer, the rivalry gained much attention, especially when both players were in contention for the world No. 1 position and for major titles. In terms of number of matches played, it is the 14th most prolific men's rivalry in the Open Era.

Both men are major champions (Federer with 20 titles to Roddick's one) and former world No. 1 players. Roddick lost four Grand Slam finals (Wimbledon in 2004, 2005, and 2009, and the US Open in 2006), all to Federer. Their match in the 2009 Wimbledon final, which reached a thirty-game fifth set, has been called one of the greatest matches in tennis history. On February 2, 2004, Federer overtook Roddick as world No. 1 to begin his record run of 237 consecutive weeks at the top position. They were the two highest-ranked players in the world from November 2003 to January 2005.

Roddick retired in 2012, ending the rivalry.

== Notable matches ==
=== 2002 Basel Quarterfinal ===
The third match played between Federer and Roddick was in Federer's hometown of Basel, Switzerland, at the 2002 Davidoff Swiss Indoors. Federer had won the first set in a tiebreak and was up by a break in the second set when Federer made what Patrick McEnroe said was the "best shot of his career". This shot occurred in the fifth game of the third set, Roddick serving down 1–3. From the ad-court, Roddick used a cramping body-serve to Federer's backhand side, and forcing a short return, moved up to the net. Having employed a serve and volley tactic, Roddick chipped a forehand across court while running to the net, and scrambled to return Federer's second shot. Scurrying back to the other side of the court, Federer managed to flick a low backhand lob. But it was too short, and Roddick smashed a huge overhead that appeared to be a winner. But, somehow Federer sprinted to the back corner of the court, almost in the stands, and hit a slicing overhead, which curved slowly sideways into the court behind Roddick's back. Roddick watched as the ball fell in, and jokingly threw his racquet over the net in disbelief. Federer went on to win the second set 6–1, completing the match in straight sets.

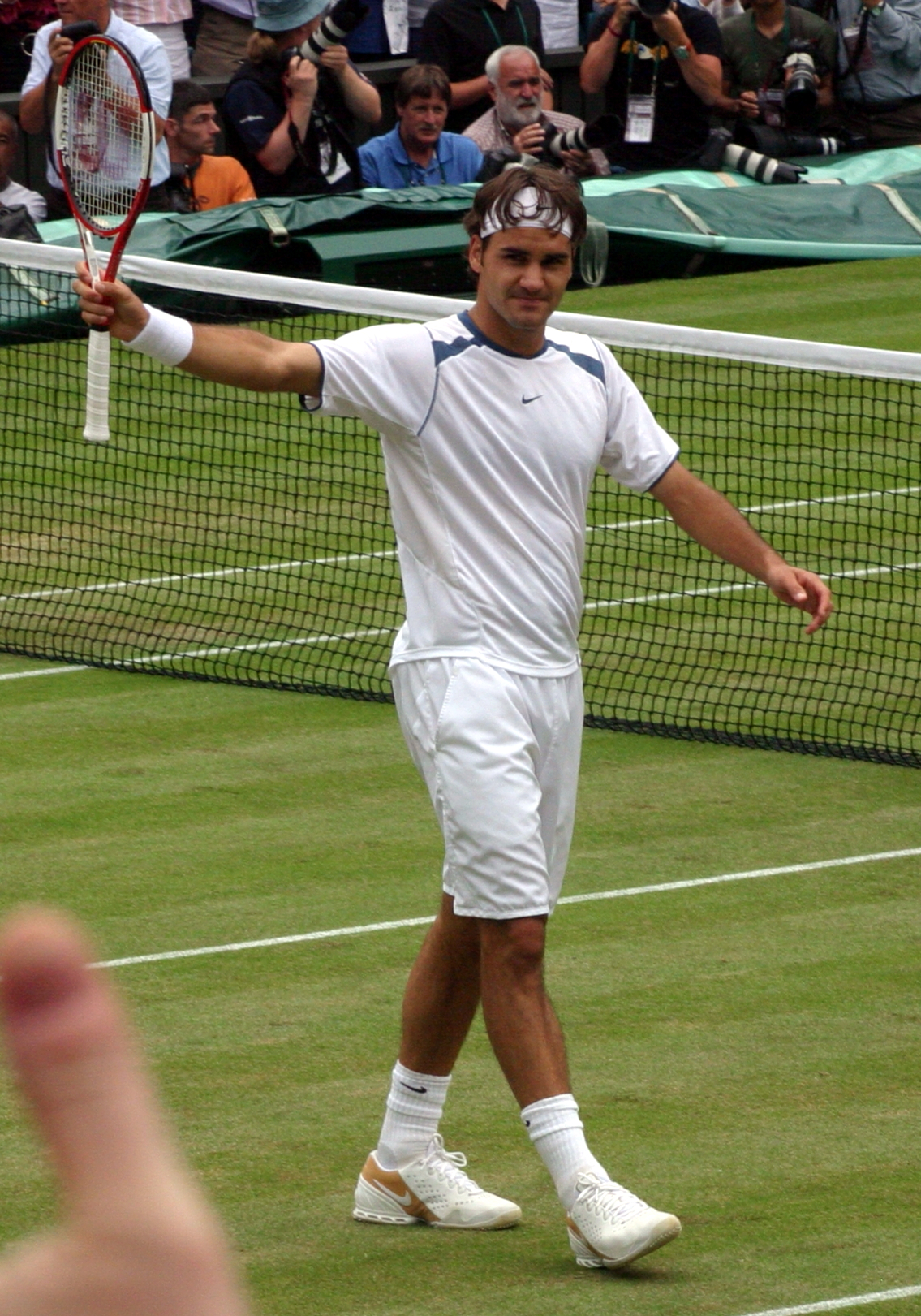
Federer won the fifth Grand Slam of his career at the 2005 Wimbledon Championships.

=== 2003 Wimbledon semifinal ===
Both players had advanced to their first Wimbledon semifinals with relative ease, each one of them having lost only one set en route to the semifinal, and the winner of the match would be a heavy favorite against Mark Philippoussis in the final. The first set was close, and went to a tie break. In the tiebreak Roddick held set point at 6–5, however he would commit a forehand error into the net and Federer would go on to win the set, and the match 7–6, 6–3, 6–3 before defeating Phillipoussis in the final to win his first of eight Wimbledon titles.

=== 2003 Montreal semifinal ===
Going into the match a win would have given Federer the number one ranking for the first time in his career. Roddick, the sixth seed at the 2003 Canada Masters tournament, had suffered four straight losses to Federer when he entered the match. He won the first set against Federer, who was the third seed, but Federer answered by winning the second set. In the third set, they went to their fifth tiebreaker in five matches, and Roddick prevailed to score his first victory over Federer. Roddick would go on to win back-to-back Masters tournaments in Montreal and Cincinnati, and the 2003 US Open, allowing him to secure the World No. 1 ranking.

=== 2004 Wimbledon final ===
The 2004 Wimbledon Final marked the first time they had met in the final of any tournament and the first time they played as the top two players in the world. Roddick was able to break Federer's serve and win the first set by using his powerful forehand, but Federer bounced back and took the second and third sets, winning the third set in a tiebreak. Roddick continued to keep the match close in the fourth set, but Federer held him off to win his second Wimbledon title and third Grand Slam title.

=== 2005 Wimbledon final ===
In 2005, Federer and Roddick played each other at Wimbledon for the third consecutive year and for the second straight year in the final. However, unlike their meeting last year, Federer won the first set with ease, breaking Roddick twice during the set. Roddick forced a tiebreak in the second set, but Federer prevailed in the tiebreak. Federer then proceeded to finish off the match after breaking Roddick once more, winning it in straight sets. It was Federer's third consecutive Wimbledon title and his fifth Grand Slam title.

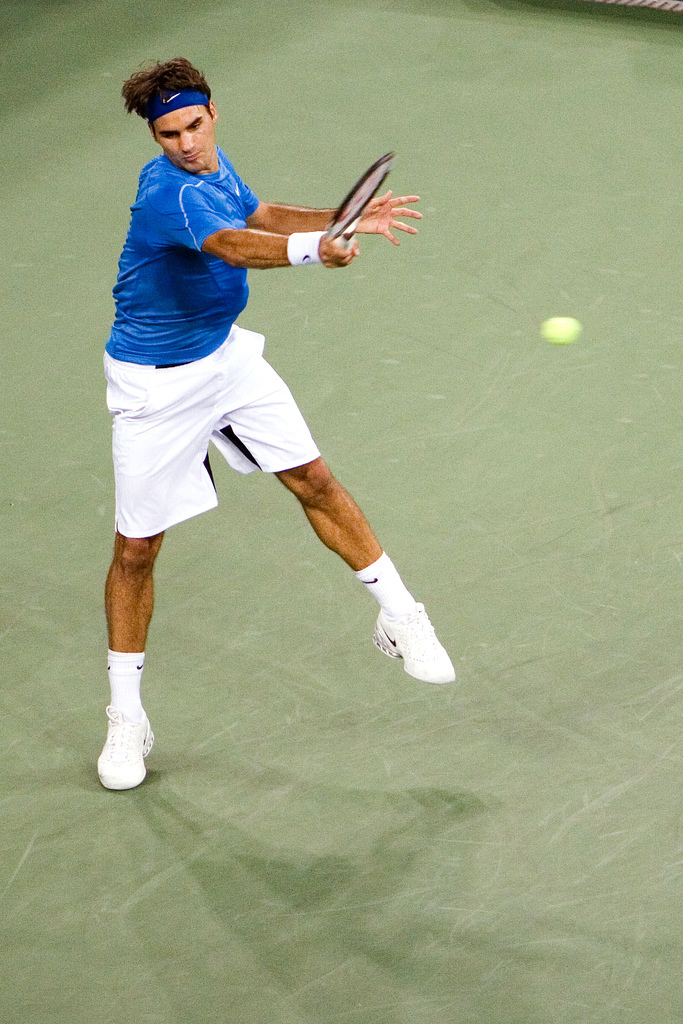
Federer won the ninth Grand Slam of his career at the 2006 US Open.

=== 2006 US Open final ===
The 2006 US Open final marked the sixth consecutive meeting in a final between Roddick and Federer, and their third consecutive in the final of a Grand Slam. Federer broke Roddick twice in the first set to win it, but Roddick broke Federer early in the second set, and held the early lead to win the set. Federer grabbed a late break against Roddick to prevent a tiebreak and win the third set, and he cruised past Roddick in the fourth set to win his third consecutive US Open.

=== 2007 Australian Open semifinal ===
Before the 2007 Australian Open, Roddick had challenged Federer in both the US Open final and the year-end championships in Shanghai and had pulled off an impressive victory over him at an exhibition tournament in Kooyong. Roddick had received much attention for claiming that he felt the gap between him and Federer was closing. Many pundits, and commentators, had expressed their belief that Roddick would finally win his second major at this event. The match began as a close affair until Federer broke Roddick late in the set and served out the set. Federer then proceeded to fly past Roddick, breaking him three times in the second set and two times in the third set to wrap up the match, 6–4, 6–0, 6–2. Following the match, Roddick gave his most famous press conference. When asked how he felt at the end of the match, Roddick stated, "It was frustrating, you know, it was miserable, it sucked, it was terrible. But besides that it was fine". The nature of Roddick's defeat to Federer, especially considering how well he had played up until the final, made many seriously question whether Roddick would ever be able to win another major so long as Federer was playing.

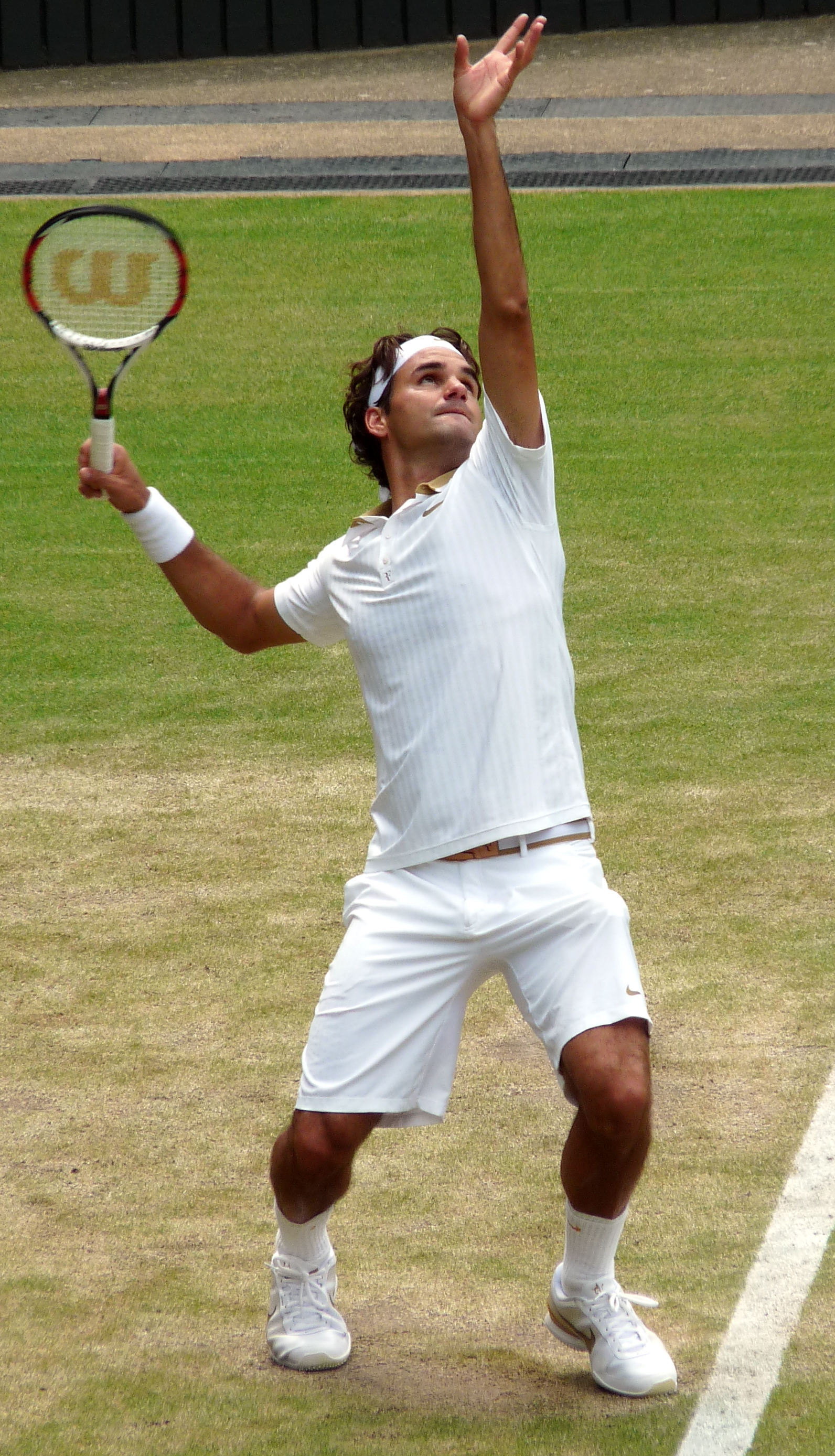
Federer's 2009 Wimbledon victory shattered the record of most Grand Slam titles, the most coveted record in all of tennis.

=== 2008 Miami quarterfinal ===
Before the matchup, both Federer and Roddick were having poor starts to their seasons; Roddick had suffered early losses in the Australian Open and in the Indian Wells Masters, while Federer was suffering from mononucleosis. At the 2008 Sony Ericsson Open (Miami Masters), Roddick won the first set tiebreak, but a break of serve in the second set allowed Federer to level the match. Roddick continued to play well, however, and won the third set, pulling out his second win over Federer and his first in almost five years.

=== 2009 Australian Open semifinal ===
Roger Federer and Andy Roddick met for a seventh time in a Grand Slam in the semi-finals of the 2009 Australian Open. It marked their first Grand Slam contest in over a year. Roddick had beaten the defending champion Novak Djokovic in the quarter-finals, and was having relative success under his new head coach Larry Stefanki. Despite Roddick's good form going into the match Federer was a straight sets winner taking the match 6–2 7–5 7–5.

=== 2009 Wimbledon final ===
Without question, the 2009 Wimbledon final was Federer and Roddick's most historic match, and their first meeting in a final since the 2006 US Open. Prior to the match, Federer had only dropped one set during the entire tournament, but Roddick had struggled to win his first three matches. Federer and Roddick were both serving well to start the match, but Roddick secured a break late in the set and took the first set. The second set went to a tiebreaker, and Roddick quickly secured four set points and led 6–2. But, on the fourth set point, Roddick mishit a backhand volley to level the tiebreaker at 6–6, and Federer took advantage of Roddick's miss to win six consecutive points from 6–2 down to win the tiebreaker 8–6 and take the second set. The third set also resulted in a tight tiebreak, which Federer won. However, in the fourth set, Roddick took momentum away from Federer with a well-placed backhand passing shot down the line to break Federer. Roddick managed to continue to hold for the rest of the set to take it 6–3. Through four sets, Federer was unable to break Roddick's powerful serve. In the deciding fifth set, both players held serve until the score was 15–14 and a mishit forehand by Roddick gave Federer a break point and match point. Federer converted the point to win the match, which gave Federer his sixth Wimbledon title. Federer also won his fifteenth Grand Slam, which broke Pete Sampras's record for most Grand Slams won. The match continues to hold the record for being the longest Wimbledon final in terms of games played.

=== 2012 Miami 3rd round ===
Federer and Roddick met for the 24th and final time in the 3rd round at Miami, with Federer leading the head-to-head 21–2. This was the first and only time they had met before the quarter-finals of any tournament. In the first set, both players held serve 6 times which led to a tiebreak in the first set, which Roddick won 7–6 (7–5). Federer cruised through the second set, winning it 6–1. Early in the third set, Roddick saved three break points for a crucial hold. The next game he broke Federer with four crushing forehand winners. Roddick went on to hold for the rest of the set, securing the win with a service winner. It proved to be their final meeting, as Roddick ended his career at the 2012 US Open, thus securing the head-to-head record at 21–3.

== List of all matches ==
Legend (2001–2008)	Legend (2009–present)	Federer	Roddick
Grand Slam	Grand Slam	8	0
Tennis Masters Cup	ATP World Tour Finals	3	0
ATP Masters Series	ATP World Tour Masters 1000	4	3
ATP International Series Gold	ATP World Tour 500 Series	2	0
ATP International Series	ATP World Tour 250 Series	4	0
Total		21	3

=== Singles (24) ===
Federer 21 – Roddick 3

No.	Year	Tournament	Tier	Surface	Round	Winner	Score	Length	Sets	Federer	Roddick
1.	2001	Swiss Indoors	250	Carpet (i)	Quarterfinals	Federer	3–6, 6–3, 7–6^{(7–5)}	1:41	3/3	1	0
2.	2002	Sydney International	250	Hard	Semifinals	Federer	7–6^{(7–3)}, 6–4	1:21	2/3	2	0
3.	2002	Swiss Indoors	250	Carpet (i)	Quarterfinals	Federer	7–6^{(7–5)}, 6–1	1:10	2/3	3	0
4.	2003	Wimbledon	Grand Slam	Grass	Semifinals	Federer	7–6^{(8–6)}, 6–3, 6–3	1:43	3/5	4	0
5.	2003	Canadian Open	Masters	Hard	Semifinals	Roddick	6–4, 3–6, 7–6^{(7–3)}	1:56	3/3	4	1
6.	2003	Tennis Masters Cup	Tour Finals	Hard	Semifinals	Federer	7–6^{(7–2)}, 6–2	1:02	2/3	5	1
7.	2004	Wimbledon	Grand Slam	Grass	Final	Federer	4–6, 7–5, 7–6^{(7–3)}, 6–4	2:31	4/5	6	1
8.	2004	Canadian Open	Masters	Hard	Final	Federer	7–5, 6–3	1:25	2/3	7	1
9.	2004	Thailand Open	250	Hard (i)	Final	Federer	6–4, 6–0	0:57	2/3	8	1
10.	2005	Wimbledon	Grand Slam	Grass	Final	Federer	6–2, 7–6^{(7–2)}, 6–4	1:41	3/5	9	1
11.	2005	Cincinnati Masters	Masters	Hard	Final	Federer	6–3, 7–5	1:15	2/3	10	1
12.	2006	US Open	Grand Slam	Hard	Final	Federer	6–2, 4–6, 7–5, 6–1	2:25	4/5	11	1
13.	2006	Tennis Masters Cup	Tour Finals	Hard (i)	Round Robin	Federer	4–6, 7–6^{(10–8)}, 6–4	2:29	3/3	12	1
14.	2007	Australian Open	Grand Slam	Hard	Semifinals	Federer	6–4, 6–0, 6–2	1:23	3/5	13	1
15.	2007	US Open	Grand Slam	Hard	Quarterfinals	Federer	7–6^{(7–5)}, 7–6^{(7–4)}, 6–2	2:01	3/5	14	1
16.	2007	Tennis Masters Cup	Tour Finals	Hard (i)	Round Robin	Federer	6–4, 6–2	1:01	2/3	15	1
17.	2008	Miami Open	Masters	Hard	Quarterfinals	Roddick	7–6^{(7–4)}, 4–6, 6–3	1:55	3/3	15	2
18.	2009	Australian Open	Grand Slam	Hard	Semifinals	Federer	6–2, 7–5, 7–5	2:05	3/5	16	2
19.	2009	Miami Open	Masters	Hard	Quarterfinals	Federer	6–3, 4–6, 6–4	2:03	3/3	17	2
20.	2009	Madrid Open	Masters	Clay	Quarterfinals	Federer	7–5, 6–7^{(5–7)}, 6–1	2:11	3/3	18	2
21.	2009	Wimbledon	Grand Slam	Grass	Final	Federer	5–7, 7–6^{(8–6)}, 7–6^{(7–5)}, 3–6, 16–14	4:17	5/5	19	2
22.	2010	Swiss Indoors	500	Hard (i)	Semifinals	Federer	6–2, 6–4	1:10	2/3	20	2
23.	2011	Swiss Indoors	500	Hard (i)	Quarterfinals	Federer	6–3, 6–2	1:04	2/3	21	2
24.	2012	Miami Open	Masters	Hard	Last 32	Roddick	7–6^{(7–5)}, 1–6, 6–4	2:01	3/3	21	3

== Exhibition matches ==
=== Federer–Roddick (1–2) ===
No.	Year	Tournament	Surface	Round	Winner	Score	Federer	Roddick
1.	2005	AAMI Classic	Hard	Final	Federer	6–4, 7–5	1	0
2.	2007	AAMI Classic	Hard	Final	Roddick	2–6, 6–3, 3–6	1	1
3.	2012	BNP Paribas Showdown	Hard	Final	Roddick	7–5, 7–6^{(9–7)}	1	2

== Analysis ==
=== Head-to-head tallies ===
- All matches: (24) Federer 21–3
- All finals: Federer 7–0
  - Hard courts: Federer 14–3
    - Outdoor: Federer 9–3
    - Indoor: Federer 5–0
  - Grass courts: Federer 4–0
  - Carpet courts: Federer 2–0
  - Clay courts: Federer 1–0
  - Grand Slam matches: Federer 8–0
  - Grand Slam finals: Federer 4–0
  - Tennis Masters Cup matches: Federer 3–0
  - ATP Masters Series/ATP World Tour Masters 1000 matches: Federer 4–3
  - ATP Masters Series/ATP World Tour Masters 1000 finals: Federer 2–0

== Performance timeline comparison (Grand Slam tournaments) ==
Key
**W**	F	SF	QF	#R	RR	Q#	DNQ	A	NH

(W) winner; (F) finalist; (SF) semifinalist; (QF) quarterfinalist; (#R) rounds 4, 3, 2, 1; (RR) round-robin stage; (Q#) qualification round; (DNQ) did not qualify; (A) absent; (NH) not held; (SR) strike rate (events won / competed); (W–L) win–loss record.
- **Bold** = players met during this tournament

=== 2001–2006 ===
Player	2001				2002				2003				2004				2005				2006			
Player	AUS	FRA	WIM	USA	AUS	FRA	WIM	USA	AUS	FRA	WIM	USA	AUS	FRA	WIM	USA	AUS	FRA	WIM	USA	AUS	FRA	WIM	USA
(Switzerland) **Roger Federer**	3R	QF	QF	4R	4R	1R	1R	4R	4R	1R	**W**	4R	W	3R	**W**	W	SF	SF	**W**	W	W	F	W	**W**
(United States) **Andy Roddick**	A	3R	3R	QF	2R	1R	3R	QF	SF	1R	**SF**	W	QF	2R	**F**	QF	SF	2R	**F**	1R	4R	1R	3R	**F**

=== 2007–2012 ===
Player	2007				2008				2009				2010				2011				2012			
Player	AUS	FRA	WIM	USA	AUS	FRA	WIM	USA	AUS	FRA	WIM	USA	AUS	FRA	WIM	USA	AUS	FRA	WIM	USA	AUS	FRA	WIM	USA
(Switzerland) **Roger Federer**	**W**	F	W	**W**	SF	F	F	W	**F**	W	**W**	F	W	QF	QF	SF	SF	F	QF	SF	SF	SF	W	QF
(United States) **Andy Roddick**	**SF**	1R	QF	**QF**	3R	A	2R	QF	**SF**	4R	**F**	3R	QF	3R	4R	2R	4R	A	3R	QF	2R	1R	3R	4R

=== Career evolution ===
Federer and Roddick were born about one year apart. Federer's birthday is August 8, 1981, while Roddick's is August 30, 1982. A different viewpoint of their career evolution is offered by taking the season they entered with an age of 17 as starting point. For instance in 2004, Federer started the season at 22 years old; at the end of that season, he accumulated a career record of four Grand Slam titles, a total of 22 singles titles. and his final ranking was No. 1 at 23 years old.

- Italic indicates that the player had retired.

Age (end of season)		18	19	20	21	22	23	24	25	26	27	28	29	30	31	32	33	34	35	36	37	38	39	40
(Switzerland) Roger Federer's season		1999	2000	2001	2002	2003	2004	2005	2006	2007	2008	2009	2010	2011	2012	2013	2014	2015	2016	2017	2018	2019	2020	2021
(United States) Andy Roddick's season		2000	2001	2002	2003	2004	2005	2006	2007	2008	2009	2010	2011	2012	2013	2014	2015	2016	2017	2018	2019	2020	2021	2022
Grand Slam titles	Federer	0	0	0	0	1	4	6	9	12	13	15	16	16	17	17	17	17	17	19	20	20	20	20
Grand Slam titles	Roddick	0	0	0	1	1	1	1	1	1	1	1	1	1	1	1	1	1	1	1	1	1	1	1
Grand Slam match wins	Federer	0	7	20	26	39	61	85	112	138	162	188	208	228	247	260	279	297	307	325	339	357	362	369
Grand Slam match wins	Roddick	0	8	15	32	47	59	70	83	90	106	116	125	131	131	131	131	131	131	131	131	131	131	131
Total Singles titles	Federer	0	0	1	4	11	22	33	45	53	57	61	66	70	76	77	82	88	88	95	99	103	103	103
Total Singles titles	Roddick	0	3	5	11	15	20	21	23	26	27	29	30	32	32	32	32	32	32	32	32	32	32	32
Total match wins	Federer	15	51	100	158	236	310	391	483	551	617	678	743	807	878	923	996	1059	1080	1134	1184	1237	1242	1251
Total match wins	Roddick	4	46	102	174	248	307	356	410	459	507	555	589	612	612	612	612	612	612	612	612	612	612	612
Year-end ranking	Federer	64	29	13	6	2	1	1	1	1	2	1	2	3	2	6	2	3	16	2	3	3	5	16
Year-end ranking	Roddick	156	14	10	1	2	3	6	6	8	7	8	14	39	–	–	–	–	–	–	–	–	–	–
Weeks at number 1	Federer	0	0	0	0	0	48	100	152	204	237	262	285	285	302	302	302	302	302	302	310	310	310	310
Weeks at number 1	Roddick	0	0	0	9	13	13	13	13	13	13	13	13	13	13	13	13	13	13	13	13	13	13	13
