= 2000 Davidoff Swiss Indoors – Singles =

Tennis tournament

Singles
- 2000 Davidoff Swiss Indoors

Final
- Champion: (Sweden) Thomas Enqvist
- Runner-up: (Switzerland) Roger Federer
- Score: 6–2, 4–6, 7–6^{(7–4)}, 1–6, 6–1

Details
- Draw: 32 (4Q/3WC/1LL/1SE)
- Seeds: 8

Events
| Singles | Doubles |
| ← 1999 · | Swiss Indoors | · 2001 → |

Karol Kučera was the defending champion but did not compete that year.

Thomas Enqvist won in the final 6–2, 4–6, 7–6^{(7–4)}, 1–6, 6–1 against Roger Federer.

== Seeds ==
A champion seed is indicated in bold text while text in italics indicates the round in which that seed was eliminated.

1. (Sweden) ~~Magnus Norman~~ (withdrew)
2. (Sweden) **Thomas Enqvist (champion)**
3. (Australia) Lleyton Hewitt (semifinals)
4. (United Kingdom) Tim Henman (semifinals)
5. (Spain) Juan Carlos Ferrero (first round)
6. (France) Cédric Pioline (first round)
7. (Ecuador) Nicolás Lapentti (second round)
8. (South Africa) Wayne Ferreira (first round)

== Draw ==
=== Key ===
- Q = Qualifier
- WC = Wild card
- LL = Lucky loser
- Alt = Alternate
- ITF = ITF entry
- PR = Protected ranking
- SR = Special ranking
- SE = Special exempt
- JE = Junior exempt
- JR = Junior Accelerator Programme entrant
- CO = College Accelerator Programme entrant
- NG = Next Gen Accelerator Program entrant
- w/o = Walkover
- r = Retired
- d = Defaulted

=== Finals ===
Semifinals
**(Switzerland) Roger Federer** | **6** | 5 | **7^{8}**
3 | (Australia) Lleyton Hewitt | 4 | **7** | 6^{6}
4 | (United Kingdom) Tim Henman | 1 | 3
2 | **(Sweden) Thomas Enqvist** | **6** | **6**

Final
(Switzerland) Roger Federer | 2 | **6** | 6^{4} | **6** | 1
2 | **(Sweden) Thomas Enqvist** | **6** | 4 | **7^{7}** | 1 | **6**

=== Top half ===
First round
LL | (France) S Huet | 5 | 4
**(Romania) A Pavel** | **7** | **6**
**(Switzerland) R Federer** | **6** | **6**
WC | (Germany) T Haas | 3 | 3
Q | **(France) N Thomann** | **6** | **6**
(France) N Escudé | 4 | 3
(Chile) M Ríos | **6** | 4 | 4
7 | **(Ecuador) N Lapentti** | 3 | **6** | **6**
3 | **(Australia) L Hewitt** | **6** | **6**
Q | (France) C Saulnier | 2 | 2
(Morocco) Y El Aynaoui | 0 | 1
**(Sweden) A Vinciguerra** | **6** | **6**
(Morocco) K Alami | 5 | 1
**(United Kingdom) G Rusedski** | **7** | **6**
**(Netherlands) R Krajicek** | **6** | **6**
5 | (Spain) JC Ferrero | 4 | 3

Second round
(Romania) A Pavel | 6^{4} | 4
**(Switzerland) R Federer** | **7^{7}** | **6**
Q | **(France) N Thomann** | **7^{8}** | **7^{7}**
7 | (Ecuador) N Lapentti | 6^{6} | 6^{5}
3 | **(Australia) L Hewitt** | **6** | **7**
(Sweden) A Vinciguerra | 3 | 5
**(United Kingdom) G Rusedski** | 2 | **7^{7}** | **7**
(Netherlands) R Krajicek | **6** | 6^{5} | 5

Quarterfinals
**(Switzerland) R Federer** | **6** | **6**
Q | (France) N Thomann | 4 | 4
3 | **(Australia) L Hewitt** | **7^{7}** | **6**
(United Kingdom) G Rusedski | 6^{5} | 2

Semifinals
**(Switzerland) R Federer** | **6** | 5 | **7^{8}**
3 | (Australia) L Hewitt | 4 | **7** | 6^{6}

=== Bottom half ===
First round
6 | (France) C Pioline | 3 | **6** | 2
Q | **(Italy) D Sanguinetti** | **6** | 3 | **6**
WC | (Switzerland) M Kratochvil | **6** | 3 | 2
**(Morocco) H Arazi** | 3 | **6** | **6**
SE | (Spain) Á Calatrava | **6** | 6^{2} | 2
**(France) A Clément** | 4 | **7^{7}** | **6**
Q | (Spain) T Robredo | 3 | 4
4 | **(United Kingdom) T Henman** | **6** | **6**
8 | (South Africa) W Ferreira | 2 | 3
WC | **(Switzerland) G Bastl** | **6** | **6**
**(Slovakia) D Hrbatý** | 3 | **6** | **6**
(France) S Grosjean | **6** | 4 | 4
**(France) J Golmard** | **6** | **6**
(Argentina) G Gaudio | 4 | 1
(United States) J-M Gambill | 6^{14} | 6^{5}
2 | **(Sweden) T Enqvist** | **7^{16}** | **7^{7}**

Second round
Q | (Italy) D Sanguinetti | 5 | 5
**(Morocco) H Arazi** | **7** | **7**
(France) A Clément | 3 | 4
4 | **(United Kingdom) T Henman** | **6** | **6**
WC | (Switzerland) G Bastl | 2 | 6^{6}
**(Slovakia) D Hrbatý** | **6** | **7^{8}**
(France) J Golmard | 4 | 2
2 | **(Sweden) T Enqvist** | **6** | **6**

Quarterfinals
(Morocco) H Arazi | 3 | 3
4 | **(United Kingdom) T Henman** | **6** | **6**
(Slovakia) D Hrbatý | **6** | 2 | 3
2 | **(Sweden) T Enqvist** | 4 | **6** | **6**

Semifinals
4 | (United Kingdom) T Henman | 1 | 3
2 | **(Sweden) T Enqvist** | **6** | **6**

== Qualifying ==
=== Qualifying seeds ===
1. (Italy) **Davide Sanguinetti (qualified)**
2. (Croatia) Ivan Ljubičić (first round)
3. (France) Stéphane Huet (qualifying competition, **lucky loser**)
4. (Germany) Christian Vinck (first round)
5. (France) **Cyril Saulnier (qualified)**
6. (Czech Republic) Tomáš Zíb (first round)
7. (Russia) Nikolay Davydenko (qualifying competition)
8. (Spain) **Tommy Robredo (qualified)**

=== Qualifiers ===
1. (Italy) **Davide Sanguinetti**
2. (Spain) **Tommy Robredo**
3. (France) **Cyril Saulnier**
4. (France) **Nicolas Thomann**

=== Lucky loser ===
1. (France) **Stéphane Huet**

=== Special exempt ===
1. (Spain) **Álex Calatrava** (reached the semifinals at Shanghai)

=== Qualifying draw ===
==== First qualifier ====
First round
1 | **(Italy) Davide Sanguinetti** | 3 | **6** | **6**
WC | (Germany) Bernhard Parun | **6** | 3 | 3
**(United Kingdom) Barry Cowan** | **6** | **7**
WC | (Italy) Daniele Bracciali | 3 | 5
**(United States) Alex O'Brien** | 4 | **7^{7}** | **6**
(Germany) Andy Fahlke | **6** | 6^{4} | 2
(France) Paul-Henri Mathieu | 4 | 5
7 | **(Russia) Nikolay Davydenko** | **6** | **7**

Second round
1 | **(Italy) Davide Sanguinetti** | **6** | **6**
(United Kingdom) Barry Cowan | 3 | 3
(United States) Alex O'Brien | 1 | 4
7 | **(Russia) Nikolay Davydenko** | **6** | **6**

Qualifying competition
1 | **(Italy) Davide Sanguinetti** | 4 | **6** | **6**
7 | (Russia) Nikolay Davydenko | **6** | 0 | 3

==== Second qualifier ====
First round
2 | (Croatia) Ivan Ljubičić | 2 | 4
**(France) Jean-François Bachelot** | **6** | **6**
**(France) Lionel Roux** | **7^{7}** | **6**
(Italy) Elia Grossi | 6^{4} | 2
(Netherlands) Rogier Wassen | 4 | 4
**(Czech Republic) Petr Luxa** | **6** | **6**
WC | (Switzerland) Jean-Claude Scherrer | 2 | 6^{0}
8 | **(Spain) Tommy Robredo** | **6** | **7^{7}**

Second round
**(France) Jean-François Bachelot** | **6** | 3 | **6**
(France) Lionel Roux | 2 | **6** | 3
(Czech Republic) Petr Luxa | **6** | 5 | 6^{6}
8 | **(Spain) Tommy Robredo** | 3 | **7** | **7^{8}**

Qualifying competition
(France) Jean-François Bachelot | 5 | **7^{7}** | 6^{5}
8 | **(Spain) Tommy Robredo** | **7** | 6^{3} | **7^{7}**

==== Third qualifier ====
First round
3 | **(France) Stéphane Huet** | **6** | **6**
(Czech Republic) Robin Vik | 2 | 2
**(France) Jean-René Lisnard** | **6** | **6**
WC | (France) Nicolas Mahut | 2 | 3
(Switzerland) Yves Allegro | **6** | 6^{5} | 2
**(France) Michaël Llodra** | 4 | **7^{7}** | **6**
(Italy) Stefano Tarallo | 2 | 4
5 | **(France) Cyril Saulnier** | **6** | **6**

Second round
3 | **(France) Stéphane Huet** | 3 | **7** | **6**
(France) Jean-René Lisnard | **6** | 5 | 3
(France) Michaël Llodra | **6** | 6^{2} | 2
5 | **(France) Cyril Saulnier** | 4 | **7^{7}** | **6**

Qualifying competition
3 | (France) Stéphane Huet | 5 | 5
5 | **(France) Cyril Saulnier** | **7** | **7**

==== Fourth qualifier ====
First round
4 | (Germany) Christian Vinck | 2 | 4
**(Germany) Marc-Kevin Goellner** | **6** | **6**
**(Italy) Renzo Furlan** | 4 | **6** | **6**
(Switzerland) Ivo Heuberger | **6** | 2 | 3
**(France) Nicolas Thomann** | **6** | **6**
(United Kingdom) Jamie Delgado | 4 | 4
**(Switzerland) Lorenzo Manta** | **6** | **6**
6 | (Czech Republic) Tomáš Zíb | 3 | 3

Second round
(Germany) Marc-Kevin Goellner | 5 | **7^{7}** | 3
**(Italy) Renzo Furlan** | **7** | 6^{5} | **6**
**(France) Nicolas Thomann** | **6** | **6**
(Switzerland) Lorenzo Manta | 3 | 4

Qualifying competition
(Italy) Renzo Furlan | 3 | 3
**(France) Nicolas Thomann** | **6** | **6**
