= 2000 Davidoff Swiss Indoors – Doubles =

Doubles
- 2000 Davidoff Swiss Indoors

Final
- Champions: (United States) Donald Johnson (South Africa) Piet Norval
- Runners-up: (Switzerland) Roger Federer (Slovakia) Dominik Hrbatý
- Score: 7–6^{(11–9)}, 4–6, 7–6^{(7–4)}

Details
- Draw: 16 (3WC/1Q)
- Seeds: 4

Events
Singles	Doubles
← 1999 ·	Swiss Indoors	· 2001 →

Brent Haygarth and Aleksandar Kitinov were the defending champions, but did not participate together this year. Haygarth partnered Wayne Ferreira, losing in the first round. Kitinov did not participate, as he chose to compete at Moscow during the same week, losing at the qualifying rounds.

Donald Johnson and Piet Norval won in the final 7–6^{(11–9)}, 4–6, 7–6^{(7–4)}, against Roger Federer and Dominik Hrbatý.

== Seeds ==
1. (Netherlands) Paul Haarhuis / (Australia) Sandon Stolle (quarterfinals)
2. (South Africa) Ellis Ferreira / (United States) Rick Leach (first round)
3. (United States) Alex O'Brien / (United States) Jared Palmer (quarterfinals)
4. (United States) Donald Johnson / (South Africa) Piet Norval (champions)

== Draw ==
=== Key ===
- Q = Qualifier
- WC = Wild card
- LL = Lucky loser
- Alt = Alternate
- ITF = ITF entry
- PR = Protected ranking
- SR = Special ranking
- SE = Special exempt
- JE = Junior exempt
- JR = Junior Accelerator Programme entrant
- CO = College Accelerator Programme entrant
- NG = Next Gen Accelerator Program entrant
- w/o = Walkover
- r = Retired
- d = Defaulted

=== Draw ===
First round
1	(Netherlands) P Haarhuis (Australia) S Stolle	6^{4}	7^{7}	6
(South Africa) W Ferreira (South Africa) B Haygarth	7^{7}	6^{5}	2
WC	(Germany) T Haas (Australia) L Hewitt	3	3
(South Africa) D Adams (Australia) D Macpherson	6	6
3	(United States) A O'Brien (United States) J Palmer	7^{7}	6
(India) M Bhupathi (India) L Paes	6^{5}	4
(Switzerland) R Federer (Slovakia) D Hrbatý	7	7^{7}
WC	(Germany) M-K Goellner (Switzerland) L Manta	5	6^{3}
(South Africa) C Haggard (Belgium) T Vanhoudt	7^{10}	6^{5}	6
Q	(South Africa) P Rosner (South Africa) J Weir-Smith	6^{8}	7^{7}	4
(Australia) M Hill (United States) J Tarango	3	6	3
4	(United States) D Johnson (South Africa) P Norval	6	3	6
(Spain) T Carbonell (Argentina) M García	4	7	2
(United States) J-M Gambill (United States) S Humphries	6	5	6
WC	(Switzerland) G Bastl (Ecuador) N Lapentti	6^{2}	6	6
2	(South Africa) E Ferreira (United States) R Leach	7^{7}	4	2

Quarterfinals
1	(Netherlands) P Haarhuis (Australia) S Stolle	4	6	6^{4}
(South Africa) D Adams (Australia) D Macpherson	6	3	7^{7}
3	(United States) A O'Brien (United States) J Palmer	2	3
(Switzerland) R Federer (Slovakia) D Hrbatý	6	6
(South Africa) C Haggard (Belgium) T Vanhoudt	6^{2}	3
4	(United States) D Johnson (South Africa) P Norval	7^{7}	6
(United States) J-M Gambill (United States) S Humphries	6	6^{4}	6
WC	(Switzerland) G Bastl (Ecuador) N Lapentti	4	7^{7}	4

Semifinals
(South Africa) D Adams (Australia) D Macpherson	5	2
(Switzerland) R Federer (Slovakia) D Hrbatý	7	6
4	(United States) D Johnson (South Africa) P Norval	6	3	6
(United States) J-M Gambill (United States) S Humphries	4	6	4

Final
(Switzerland) R Federer (Slovakia) D Hrbatý	6^{9}	6	6^{4}
4	(United States) D Johnson (South Africa) P Norval	7^{11}	4	7^{7}

== Qualifying ==
=== Qualifying seeds ===
1. (South Africa) Paul Rosner / (South Africa) Jason Weir-Smith (qualified)
2. (Italy) Cristian Brandi / (Czech Republic) Petr Luxa (first round)

=== Qualifiers ===
1. (South Africa) Paul Rosner / (South Africa) Jason Weir-Smith

=== Qualifying draw ===
First round
1	(South Africa) Paul Rosner (South Africa) Jason Weir-Smith	7^{7}	7^{7}
WC	(Switzerland) Yves Allegro (Romania) Andrei Pavel	6^{5}	6^{2}
(Czech Republic) David Škoch (United States) Jack Waite	7	6
2	(Italy) Cristian Brandi (Czech Republic) Petr Luxa	5	2

Qualifying competition
1	(South Africa) Paul Rosner (South Africa) Jason Weir-Smith	4	6	6
(Czech Republic) David Škoch (United States) Jack Waite	6	2	3
