= 2009 Wimbledon Championships – Men's singles final =

Tennis match

Wimbledon 2009 Men's Final
- (Switzerland) Roger Federer (2) vs. (United States) Andy Roddick (6)
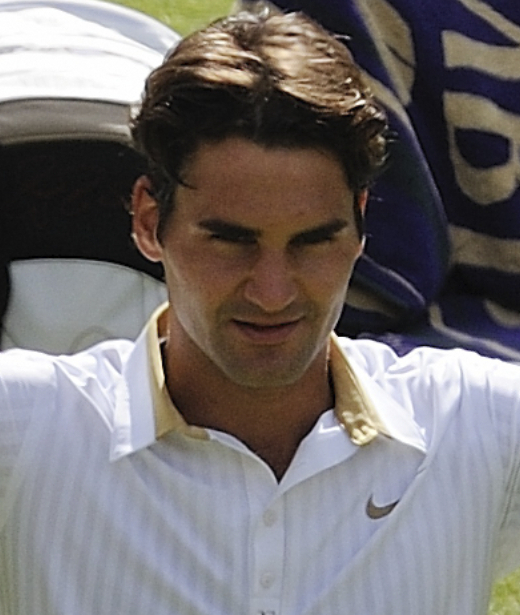
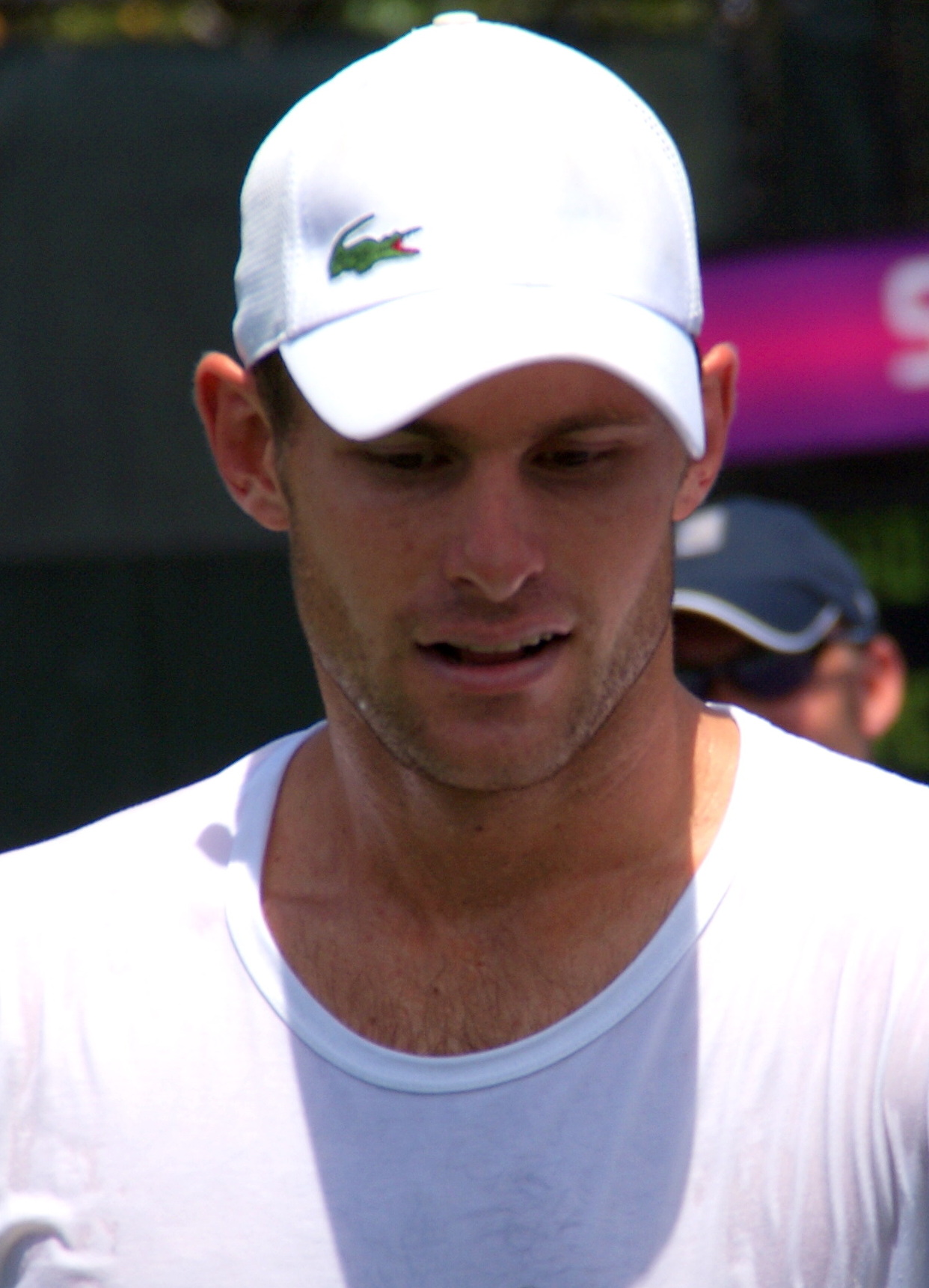
- Roger Federer (left) and Andy Roddick (right)
Set	1	2	3	4	5
(Switzerland) Roger Federer	5	7^{8}	7^{7}	3	16
(United States) Andy Roddick	7	6^{6}	6^{5}	6	14
- Date: Sunday, 5 July 2009
- Tournament: The Championships, Wimbledon
- Location: Centre Court, All England Lawn Tennis and Croquet Club, Wimbledon, London
- Chair umpire: Lars Graff
- Duration: 4 hours 17 minutes
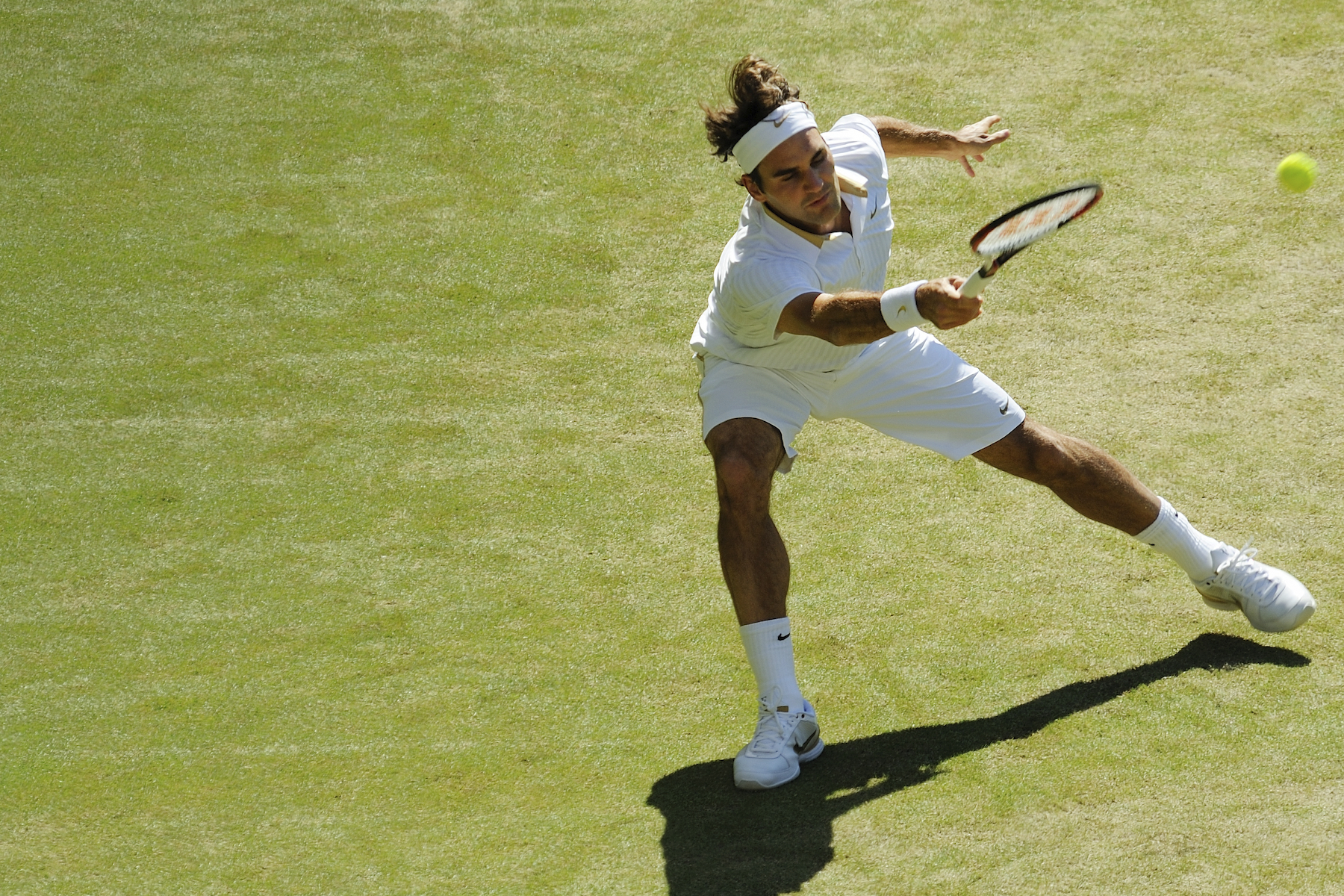
- Roger Federer broke the all-time record with his 15th Grand Slam championship

The 2009 Wimbledon Championships Men's Singles final was the championship tennis match of the Men's Singles tournament at the 2009 Wimbledon Championships. A significant part of the Federer–Roddick rivalry, it pitted five-time champion Roger Federer against American Andy Roddick for the third time in a Wimbledon final and the fourth time in a Grand Slam final. After 4 hours and 17 minutes, Federer won 5–7, 7–6^{(8–6)}, 7–6^{(7–5)}, 3–6, 16–14. This match was historic as it saw Federer capture his fifteenth major title, breaking the all-time Grand Slam record held by Pete Sampras. The victory also caused Federer to reclaim the world number 1 ranking from his rival Rafael Nadal.

The championship set a record for most games played in a Grand Slam final, due, particularly, to the unprecedented thirty games contested in the final set. Under the rules for Grand Slams introduced by the Grand Slam Board in March 2022, this record cannot be broken, as a 10-point tie-break now occurs once the score reaches 6–6 in any Grand Slam final set.

== Background ==
Roger Federer had tied Sampras with fourteen major singles titles a month earlier at the 2009 French Open and was seeking to set a new standard of excellence in the men's game by capturing an unprecedented fifteenth championship. Former world number 1 Andy Roddick was looking to capture his first Wimbledon title and second Grand Slam, having won the 2003 US Open.

The 2009 Wimbledon Men's Singles final was the fourth Grand Slam final that Federer and Roddick had contested and by far the most competitive. Federer had won all of the previous finals at the 2004 Wimbledon Championships, the 2005 Wimbledon Championships and the 2006 US Open.

Federer had cruised through the bottom half of the draw only dropping a single set en route to his seventh consecutive Wimbledon final. Roddick, however, had survived a grueling five set quarterfinal against former Wimbledon champion Lleyton Hewitt where he won 6–3, 6–7^{(10–12)}, 7–6^{(7–1)}, 4–6, 6–4. Roddick then defeated British hope Andy Murray, the world number 3, in the semifinals 6–4, 4–6, 7–6^{(9–7)}, 7–6^{(7–5)} to book a spot in his third Wimbledon final.

== Match details ==
The chair umpire was Lars Graff of Sweden. Both players began the match strongly, with the first eleven games of the first set going with serve. However, with Federer serving at 5–6, Roddick broke to take the first set. Perhaps the most critical moment of the match was in the second-set tiebreaker, when Roddick led 6–2 with four set points to take a commanding lead. Federer subsequently reeled off six consecutive points to even the match at one set apiece. The most memorable moment of the tiebreaker was when Roddick served at 6–5 set point and botched a back-hand volley wide to even up the tiebreaker.

The third set was a tight affair without any breaks of serve for the second consecutive set. The tiebreaker went to Federer who was now only one set away from breaking Pete Sampras' all-time Grand Slam record. Roddick, however, surprised many by breaking Federer in the fourth set to even the match and take the Wimbledon final to a decisive fifth set for the third consecutive year.

The fifth set would turn out to be a historic battle. Both players were dominant on serve throughout the first sixteen games without a single break point opportunity to be had. A moment of crisis arrived for Federer with him serving at 8–8 down 15–40, but he rallied to deny Roddick the opportunity to serve for the match. There was not another break opportunity until Roddick served at 14–15 and Federer broke him, for the first time in the entire match, to win a record-breaking fifteenth Grand Slam championship. This set remains the longest fifth set in a Grand Slam final. It is the only time in Grand Slam final history where a player has lost despite only having their serve broken once.

== Statistics ==
Category	(Switzerland) Federer	(United States) Roddick
1st Serve %	64%	70%
Aces	50	27
Double Faults	4	4
Winners	107	74
Unforced Errors (UFEs)	38	33
Winners-UFEs	+69	+41
Winning % on 1st Serve	89%	83%
Winning % on 2nd Serve	60%	44%
Receiving Points Won	28%	21%
Break Point Conversions	1/7 (14%)	2/5 (40%)
Net Approaches Won	38/59 (64%)	42/69 (61%)
Total Points Won	223	213
Fastest Serve	135 mph	143 mph
Average 1st Serve Speed	118 mph	127 mph
Average 2nd Serve Speed	98 mph	105 mph

_{Source}

== Significance ==
This match was the culmination of Federer's historic summer of 2009. After winning the French Open a month earlier to complete the career grand slam, Federer's win gave him his standalone record 15th major title and led many to proclaim him as the greatest player of all time. Due to the historic nature of Federer's accomplishment, Pete Sampras flew to London from California to witness Federer set the all-time Grand Slam record. It was the first time that he had returned to the All England Club for The Championships since 2002. Other tennis legends Björn Borg and Rod Laver also attended.

The match set the record of most games played in a Grand Slam final (77) and most games played in the fifth set of any Grand Slam final (30). The previous record for most games played in a Grand Slam final was the 1927 Australian Championships final (71) and the previous record for most games in a fifth set was the 1927 French Championships final (20). Roddick's 39 winning games in the final was the most won by any player, not to have also won the championship.

In the United States the match was the most watched Wimbledon final in a decade, since the all American contest of Sampras-Agassi in 1999. It pulled in 5.71 million viewers, which constituted a 9% increase over the Federer–Nadal final of 2008. In the United Kingdom the final averaged 7.1 million viewers, with a peak of 11.1 million when Federer clinched victory.

== See also ==
- Federer–Roddick rivalry
- 2007 Wimbledon Championships – Men's singles final
- 2009 French Open – Men's singles final
- 2012 Wimbledon Championships – Men's singles final
