= 2001 Davidoff Swiss Indoors – Doubles =

Doubles
- 2001 Davidoff Swiss Indoors

Final
- Champions: (South Africa) Ellis Ferreira (United States) Rick Leach
- Runners-up: (India) Mahesh Bhupathi (India) Leander Paes
- Score: 7–6^{(7–3)}, 6–4

Details
- Draw: 16
- Seeds: 4

Events
Singles	Doubles
← 2000 ·	Swiss Indoors	· 2002 →

Donald Johnson and Piet Norval were the defending champions but did not compete that year.

Ellis Ferreira and Rick Leach won in the final 7–6^{(7–3)}, 6–4 against Mahesh Bhupathi and Leander Paes.

== Seeds ==
Champion seeds are indicated in bold text while text in italics indicates the round in which those seeds were eliminated.

1. (Canada) Daniel Nestor / (Federal Republic of Yugoslavia) Nenad Zimonjić (semifinals)
2. (Czech Republic) Petr Pála / (Czech Republic) Pavel Vízner (first round)
3. (India) Mahesh Bhupathi / (India) Leander Paes (final)
4. (Argentina) Lucas Arnold / (Australia) Michael Hill (first round)

== Draw ==
=== Key ===
- Q = Qualifier
- WC = Wild card
- LL = Lucky loser
- Alt = Alternate
- SE = Special exempt
- PR = Protected ranking
- ITF = ITF entry
- JE = Junior exempt
- w/o = Walkover
- r = Retired
- d = Defaulted
- SR = Special ranking

First round
1	(Canada) **D Nestor** (Federal Republic of Yugoslavia) **N Zimonjić**	**6**	3	**7^{7}**
(Argentina) M García (Czech Republic) C Suk	4	**6**	6^{5}
WC	(United States) A Roddick (United States) J Tarango	6^{6}	4
(South Africa) **M Barnard** (United States) **J Thomas**	**7^{8}**	**6**
4	(Argentina) L Arnold (Australia) M Hill	1	5
WC	(Switzerland) **R Federer** (Switzerland) **M Kratochvil**	**6**	**7**
ALT	(Spain) A Costa (Spain) T Robredo	3	6^{4}
(South Africa) **E Ferreira** (United States) **R Leach**	**6**	**7^{7}**
(Spain) J Balcells (Spain) A Portas	6^{5}	4
(France) **J Boutter** (France) **A Clément**	**7^{7}**	**6**
(Czech Republic) T Cibulec (Czech Republic) L Friedl	4	2
3	(India) **M Bhupathi** (India) **L Paes**	**6**	**6**
WC	(Spain) **À Corretja** (Spain) **C Moyá**	**6**	4	**6**
**(Argentina) P Albano** **(Australia) D Macpherson**	4	**6**	2
WC	(Switzerland) **G Bastl** (Switzerland) **I Heuberger**	**7^{7}**	**6**
2	(Czech Republic) P Pála (Czech Republic) P Vízner	6^{2}	2

Quarterfinals
1	(Canada) **D Nestor** (Federal Republic of Yugoslavia) **N Zimonjić**	4	**7**	**6**
(South Africa) M Barnard (United States) J Thomas	**6**	5	3
WC	(Switzerland) R Federer (Switzerland) M Kratochvil
(South Africa) **E Ferreira** (United States) **R Leach**	w/o
(France) J Boutter (France) A Clément	**6**	3	4
3	(India) **M Bhupathi** (India) **L Paes**	4	**6**	**6**
WC	(Spain) À Corretja (Spain) C Moyá	5	**6**	1
WC	(Switzerland) **G Bastl** (Switzerland) **I Heuberger**	**7**	3	**6**

Semifinals
1	(Canada) D Nestor (Federal Republic of Yugoslavia) N Zimonjić	6^{6}	2
(South Africa) **E Ferreira** (United States) **R Leach**	**7^{8}**	**6**
3	(India) **M Bhupathi** (India) **L Paes**	**6**	**6**
WC	(Switzerland) G Bastl (Switzerland) I Heuberger	3	3

Final
(South Africa) **Ellis Ferreira** (United States) **Rick Leach**	**7^{7}**	**6**
3	(India) Mahesh Bhupathi (India) Leander Paes	6^{3}	4
