= 2002 Davidoff Swiss Indoors =

- Date: 21–27 October
- Edition: 33rd
- Category: International Series
- Draw: 32S / 16D
- Prize money: $975,000
- Surface: Carpet / indoor
- Location: Basel, Switzerland
- Venue: St. Jakobshalle

Champions

Singles
- (Argentina) David Nalbandian

Doubles
- (United States) Bob Bryan / (United States) Mike Bryan
← 2001 ·	Swiss Indoors	· 2003 →

The 2002 Davidoff Swiss Indoors was a men's tennis tournament played on indoor carpet courts at the St. Jakobshalle in Basel in Switzerland and was part of the International Series of the 2002 ATP Tour. The tournament ran from 21 October through 27 October 2002. Sixth-seeded David Nalbandian won the singles title.

== Finals ==
=== Singles ===
(Argentina) David Nalbandian defeated (Chile) Fernando González 6–4, 6–3, 6–2

- It was Nalbandian's 2nd title of the year and the 2nd of his career.

=== Doubles ===
(United States) Bob Bryan / (United States) Mike Bryan defeated (The Bahamas) Mark Knowles / (Canada) Daniel Nestor 7–6^{(7–1)}, 7–5

- It was Bob Bryan's 5th title of the year and the 9th of his career. It was Mike Bryan's 7th title of the year and the 11th of his career.
