= 1999 Davidoff Swiss Indoors – Singles =

Singles
- 1999 Davidoff Swiss Indoors

Final
- Champion: (Slovakia) Karol Kučera
- Runner-up: (United Kingdom) Tim Henman
- Score: 6–4, 7–6^{(12–10)}, 4–6, 4–6, 7–6^{(7–2)}

Details
- Draw: 32 (4Q/3WC/2LL/2SE)
- Seeds: 8

Events
Singles	Doubles
← 1998 ·	Swiss Indoors	· 2000 →

Tim Henman was the defending champion, but lost in the final to Karol Kučera 6–4, 7–6^{(12–10)}, 4–6, 4–6, 7–6^{(7–2)}.

== Seeds ==
A champion seed is indicated in bold text while text in italics indicates the round in which that seed was eliminated.

1. (United States) Andre Agassi (quarterfinals)
2. (Russia) Yevgeny Kafelnikov (quarterfinals)
3. (United Kingdom) Greg Rusedski (quarterfinals)
4. (United Kingdom) Tim Henman (final)
5. N/A
6. (Germany) Nicolas Kiefer (semifinals)
7. (Ecuador) Nicolás Lapentti (first round)
8. (Sweden) Thomas Enqvist (first round)

== Draw ==
=== Key ===
- Q = Qualifier
- WC = Wild card
- LL = Lucky loser
- Alt = Alternate
- SE = Special exempt
- PR = Protected ranking
- ITF = ITF entry
- JE = Junior exempt
- w/o = Walkover
- r = Retired
- d = Defaulted
- SR = Special ranking

=== Finals ===
Semifinals
**(Slovakia) Karol Kučera**	**6**	**6**
6	(Germany) Nicolas Kiefer	4	3
4	**(United Kingdom) Tim Henman**	**6**	**6**
(Croatia) Goran Ivanišević	3	4

Final
**(Slovakia) Karol Kučera**	**6**	**7^{12}**	4	4	**7^{7}**
4	(United Kingdom) Tim Henman	4	6^{10}	**6**	**6**	6^{2}

=== Top half ===
First round
1	**(United States) A Agassi**	**6**	**6**
(Netherlands) J Siemerink	3	4
Q	(Germany) R Schüttler	2	3
SE	**(France) N Escudé**	**6**	**6**
(Sweden) T Johansson	5	3
**(Slovakia) K Kučera**	**7**	**6**
**(Morocco) H Arazi**	**6**	3	**6**
7	(Ecuador) N Lapentti	3	**6**	3
3	**(United Kingdom) G Rusedski**	**7^{7}**	**6**
(France) F Santoro	6^{3}	2
**(Slovakia) D Hrbatý**	**6**	**6**
(Romania) A Pavel	2	0
SE	(Czech Republic) D Vacek	4	4
**(Czech Republic) J Novák**	**6**	**6**
(Sweden) M Larsson	1	4
6	**(Germany) N Kiefer**	**6**	**6**

Second round
1	**(United States) A Agassi**	**6**	5	**7**
SE	(France) N Escudé	4	**7**	5
**(Slovakia) K Kučera**	**6**	**7^{7}**
(Morocco) H Arazi	1	6^{5}
3	**(United Kingdom) G Rusedski**	**6**	**6**
(Slovakia) D Hrbatý	2	2
(Czech Republic) J Novák	3	**7^{7}**	1
6	**(Germany) N Kiefer**	**6**	6^{2}	**6**

Quarterfinals
1	(United States) A Agassi	4	5
**(Slovakia) K Kučera**	**6**	**7**
3	(United Kingdom) G Rusedski	**6**	6^{4}	3
6	**(Germany) N Kiefer**	2	**7^{7}**	**6**

Semifinals
**(Slovakia) K Kučera**	**6**	**6**
6	(Germany) N Kiefer	4	3

=== Bottom half ===
First round
LL	(Russia) I Kornienko	5	4
Q	**(Germany) A Popp**	**7**	**6**
WC	**(Switzerland) R Federer**	**6**	3	**6**
LL	(Czech Republic) M Damm	2	**6**	4
**(Ukraine) A Medvedev**	2	**6**	**7^{7}**
(Russia) M Safin	**6**	4	6^{2}
WC	(Switzerland) G Bastl	**7**	2	2
4	**(United Kingdom) T Henman**	5	**6**	**6**
8	(Sweden) T Enqvist	4	**6**	5
**(Croatia) G Ivanišević**	**6**	4	**7**
Q	**(United States) C Woodruff**	3	**6**	**6**
(Austria) S Koubek	**6**	2	2
WC	(Switzerland) L Manta	5	**6**	6^{2}
Q	**(France) L Roux**	**7**	3	**7^{7}**
(United States) V Spadea	3	5
2	**(Russia) Y Kafelnikov**	**6**	**7**

Second round
Q	(Germany) A Popp	2	5
WC	**(Switzerland) R Federer**	**6**	**7**
(Ukraine) A Medvedev	**7**	4	1
4	**(United Kingdom) T Henman**	5	**6**	**6**
**(Croatia) G Ivanišević**	**7**	4	**7^{7}**
Q	(United States) C Woodruff	5	**6**	6^{5}
Q	(France) L Roux	1	6^{1}
2	**(Russia) Y Kafelnikov**	**6**	**7^{7}**

Quarterfinals
WC	(Switzerland) R Federer	3	5
4	**(United Kingdom) T Henman**	**6**	**7**
**(Croatia) G Ivanišević**	4	**6**	**6**
2	(Russia) Y Kafelnikov	**6**	3	4

Semifinals
4	**(United Kingdom) T Henman**	**6**	**6**
(Croatia) G Ivanišević	3	4

== Qualifying ==
=== Qualifying seeds ===
1. (Germany) **Rainer Schüttler (qualified)**
2. (Germany) David Prinosil (first round)
3. (Slovakia) Ján Krošlák (first round)
4. (United States) **Chris Woodruff (qualified)**
5. (Haiti) Ronald Agénor (second round)
6. (Czech Republic) Martin Damm (qualifying competition, **lucky loser**)
7. (Bulgaria) Orlin Stanoytchev (second round)
8. (Germany) Axel Pretzsch (qualifying competition, retired)

=== Qualifiers ===
1. (Germany) **Rainer Schüttler**
2. (France) **Lionel Roux**
3. (Germany) **Alexander Popp**
4. (United States) **Chris Woodruff**

=== Lucky losers ===
1. (Russia) **Igor Kornienko**
2. (Czech Republic) **Martin Damm**

=== Special exempts ===
1. (France) **Nicolas Escudé** (champion at Toulouse last week)
2. (Czech Republic) **Daniel Vacek** (runner-up at Toulouse last week)

=== Qualifying draw ===
==== First qualifier ====
First round
1	**(Germany) Rainer Schüttler**	**6**	3	**6**
(France) Nicolas Thomann	2	**6**	0
WC	(Switzerland) Marco Chiudinelli	4	2
**(Argentina) Gastón Etlis**	**6**	**6**
**(Zimbabwe) Kevin Ullyett**	6	**6**	**7**
(France) Olivier Mutis	**7**	2	5
(Czech Republic) Petr Luxa	**6**	6	4
8	**(Germany) Axel Pretzsch**	1	**7**	**6**

Second round
1	**(Germany) Rainer Schüttler**	**7**	**6**
(Argentina) Gastón Etlis	5	2
(Zimbabwe) Kevin Ullyett	4	0^{r}
8	**(Germany) Axel Pretzsch**	**6**	1

Qualifying competition
1	**(Germany) Rainer Schüttler**	4
8	(Germany) Axel Pretzsch	1^{r}

==== Second qualifier ====
First round
2	(Germany) David Prinosil	6	3
**(France) Lionel Roux**	**7**	**6**
WC	(Japan) Jun Kato	3	**6**	2
WC	**(Switzerland) Michael Lammer**	**6**	2	**6**
(Switzerland) Yves Allegro	3	2
**(Russia) Igor Kornienko**	**6**	**6**
(Germany) Christian Vinck	4	4
7	**(Bulgaria) Orlin Stanoytchev**	**6**	**6**

Second round
**(France) Lionel Roux**	**6**	**6**
WC	(Switzerland) Michael Lammer	2	3
**(Russia) Igor Kornienko**	**6**	4	**6**
7	(Bulgaria) Orlin Stanoytchev	4	**6**	3

Qualifying competition
**(France) Lionel Roux**	4	**6**	**7**
(Russia) Igor Kornienko	**6**	4	5

==== Third qualifier ====
First round
3	(Slovakia) Ján Krošlák	6	4
**(France) Julien Boutter**	**7**	**6**
(France) Julien Cuaz	6	6
**(France) Gérard Solvès**	**7**	**7**
WC	(Switzerland) Sandro Della Piana	4	**6**	6
**(Germany) Alexander Popp**	**6**	0	**7**
(Switzerland) Ivo Heuberger	0	1
5	**(Haiti) Ronald Agénor**	**6**	**6**

Second round
(France) Julien Boutter	2	2
**(France) Gérard Solvès**	**6**	**6**
**(Germany) Alexander Popp**	**7**	**7**
5	(Haiti) Ronald Agénor	6	5

Qualifying competition
(France) Gérard Solvès	**6**	1	1
**(Germany) Alexander Popp**	3	**6**	**6**

==== Fourth qualifier ====
First round
4	**(United States) Chris Woodruff**	**6**	**6**
(France) Olivier Malcor	0	1
**(France) Rodolphe Gilbert**	**6**	5	**6**
(Belgium) Christophe Van Garsse	4	**7**	2
**(Czech Republic) David Škoch**	**6**	6	**6**
(Belgium) Filip Dewulf	3	**7**	4
(France) Charles-Édouard Maria	1	3
6	**(Czech Republic) Martin Damm**	**6**	**6**

Second round
4	**(United States) Chris Woodruff**	**6**	**6**
(France) Rodolphe Gilbert	3	4
(Czech Republic) David Škoch	**7**	3	6
6	**(Czech Republic) Martin Damm**	6	**6**	**7**

Qualifying competition
4	**(United States) Chris Woodruff**	**7**	**7**
6	(Czech Republic) Martin Damm	6	5
