= 1999 Davidoff Swiss Indoors – Doubles =

Doubles
- 1999 Davidoff Swiss Indoors

Final
- Champions: (South Africa) Brent Haygarth (North Macedonia) Aleksandar Kitinov
- Runners-up: (Czech Republic) Jiří Novák (Czech Republic) David Rikl
- Score: 0–6, 6–4, 7–5

Details
- Draw: 16 (1Q/1LL/2WC)
- Seeds: 4

Events
Singles	Doubles
← 1998 ·	Swiss Indoors	· 2000 →

Olivier Delaître and Fabrice Santoro were the defending champions, but lost in the first round to lucky losers Martin Damm and Robbie Koenig.

Brent Haygarth and Aleksandar Kitinov won the title by defeating Jiří Novák and David Rikl 0–6, 6–4, 7–5 in the final.

== Seeds ==
1. (France) Olivier Delaître / (France) Fabrice Santoro (first round)
2. (South Africa) Ellis Ferreira / (United States) Rick Leach (first round)
3. (South Africa) David Adams / (South Africa) John-Laffnie de Jager (quarterfinals)
4. (Russia) Yevgeny Kafelnikov / (Czech Republic) Daniel Vacek (quarterfinals)

== Draw ==
=== Key ===
- Q = Qualifier
- WC = Wild card
- LL = Lucky loser
- Alt = Alternate
- SE = Special exempt
- PR = Protected ranking
- ITF = ITF entry
- JE = Junior exempt
- w/o = Walkover
- r = Retired
- d = Defaulted
- SR = Special ranking

=== Draw ===
First round
1	(France) O Delaitre (France) F Santoro	3	2
LL	(Czech Republic) M Damm (South Africa) R Koenig	6	6
(Russia) A Olhovskiy (Germany) D Prinosil	7^{7}	6
(United States) D Johnson (Czech Republic) C Suk	6^{4}	2
3	(South Africa) D Adams (South Africa) JL de Jager	6	6
(Australia) A Florent (Australia) D Macpherson	0	3
WC	(Germany) N Kiefer (Switzerland) L Manta	4	4
(Czech Republic) J Novák (Czech Republic) D Rikl	6	6
(Croatia) G Ivanišević (United States) J Tarango	6	6^{5}	6^{5}
(South Africa) P Norval (Zimbabwe) K Ullyett	1	7^{7}	7^{7}
Q	(Morocco) H Arazi (Slovakia) D Hrbatý	4	3
4	(Russia) Y Kafelnikov (Czech Republic) D Vacek	6	6
WC	(Switzerland) I Heuberger (United States) M Keil	6	6^{1}	2
(South Africa) B Haygarth (North Macedonia) A Kitinov	3	7^{7}	6
(South Africa) C Haggard (Sweden) P Nyborg	7^{11}	6
2	(South Africa) E Ferreira (United States) R Leach	6^{9}	4

Quarterfinals
LL	(Czech Republic) M Damm (South Africa) R Koenig	2	3
(Russia) A Olhovskiy (Germany) D Prinosil	6	6
3	(South Africa) D Adams (South Africa) JL de Jager	2	4
(Czech Republic) J Novák (Czech Republic) D Rikl	6	6
(South Africa) P Norval (Zimbabwe) K Ullyett	6	6
4	(Russia) Y Kafelnikov (Czech Republic) D Vacek	4	4
(South Africa) B Haygarth (North Macedonia) A Kitinov	7	6
(South Africa) C Haggard (Sweden) P Nyborg	5	3

Semifinals
(Russia) A Olhovskiy (Germany) D Prinosil	2	6^{4}
(Czech Republic) J Novák (Czech Republic) D Rikl	6	7^{7}
(South Africa) P Norval (Zimbabwe) K Ullyett	3	6^{4}
(South Africa) B Haygarth (North Macedonia) A Kitinov	6	7^{7}

Final
(Czech Republic) J Novák (Czech Republic) D Rikl	6	4	5
(South Africa) B Haygarth (North Macedonia) A Kitinov	0	6	7

== Qualifying ==
=== Qualifying seeds ===
1. (n/a)
2. (Morocco) Hicham Arazi / (Slovakia) Dominik Hrbatý (qualified)

=== Qualifiers ===
1. (Morocco) Hicham Arazi / (Slovakia) Dominik Hrbatý

=== Lucky losers ===
1. (Czech Republic) Martin Damm / (South Africa) Robbie Koenig

=== Qualifying draw ===
First round
(Czech Republic) Martin Damm (South Africa) Robbie Koenig	6	4	6
(Czech Republic) Petr Luxa (Czech Republic) David Škoch	2	6	3
WC	(Switzerland) Yves Allegro (Switzerland) George Bastl	2	6	6
2	(Morocco) Hicham Arazi (Slovakia) Dominik Hrbatý	6	4	7

Qualifying competition
(Czech Republic) Martin Damm (South Africa) Robbie Koenig	5	3
2	(Morocco) Hicham Arazi (Slovakia) Dominik Hrbatý	7	6
