= 2002 Davidoff Swiss Indoors – Doubles =

Doubles
- 2002 Davidoff Swiss Indoors

Final
- Champions: (United States) Bob Bryan (United States) Mike Bryan
- Runners-up: (The Bahamas) Mark Knowles (Canada) Daniel Nestor
- Score: 7–6^{(7–1)}, 7–5

Details
- Draw: 16
- Seeds: 4

Events
Singles	Doubles
← 2001 ·	Swiss Indoors	· 2003 →

Ellis Ferreira and Rick Leach were the defending champions but they competed with different partners that year, Ferreira with Pavel Vízner and Leach with Brian MacPhie.

Ferreira and Vízner lost in the first round to Yves Allegro and Marco Chiudinelli.

Leach and MacPhie lost in the semifinals to Bob Bryan and Mike Bryan.

The Bryans won in the final 7–6^{(7–1)}, 7–5 against Mark Knowles and Daniel Nestor.

== Seeds ==
Champion seeds are indicated in bold text while text in italics indicates the round in which those seeds were eliminated.

1. (The Bahamas) Mark Knowles / (Canada) Daniel Nestor (final)
2. (United States) **Bob Bryan** / (United States) **Mike Bryan (champions)**
3. (Czech Republic) Martin Damm / (Czech Republic) Cyril Suk (first round)
4. (Argentina) Lucas Arnold / (Argentina) Gastón Etlis (quarterfinals)

== Draw ==
=== Key ===
- Q = Qualifier
- WC = Wild card
- LL = Lucky loser
- Alt = Alternate
- SE = Special exempt
- PR = Protected ranking
- ITF = ITF entry
- JE = Junior exempt
- w/o = Walkover
- r = Retired
- d = Defaulted
- SR = Special ranking

First round
1	(The Bahamas) **M Knowles** (Canada) **D Nestor**	5	**7^{7}**	**6**
(Ecuador) N Lapentti (Argentina) D Nalbandian	**7**	6^{5}	4
WC	(Iran) **M Bahrami** (France) **C Pioline**	**6**	3	**6**
(Switzerland) G Bastl (Germany) D Prinosil	4	**6**	4
4	(Argentina) **L Arnold** (Argentina) **G Etlis**	**6**	**6**
(United States) S Humphries (Australia) D Macpherson	3	3
(United States) **J Blake** (United States) **A Roddick**	**7^{7}**	**7**
WC	(France) N Escudé (Switzerland) M Rosset	6^{5}	5
(Argentina) **M García** (Argentina) **M Rodríguez**	**6**	**6**
(Australia) T Perry (Argentina) A Schneiter	3	3
(United States) **R Leach** (United States) **B MacPhie**	5	**6**	**7^{9}**
3	(Czech Republic) M Damm (Czech Republic) C Suk	**7**	4	6^{7}
(South Africa) E Ferreira (Czech Republic) P Vízner	4	6^{6}
ALT	(Switzerland) **Y Allegro** (Switzerland) **M Chiudinelli**	**6**	**7^{8}**
(Australia) N Healey (Australia) J Kerr	1	3
2	(United States) **B Bryan** (United States) **M Bryan**	**6**	**6**

Quarterfinals
1	(The Bahamas) **M Knowles** (Canada) **D Nestor**	**7**	**6**
WC	(Iran) M Bahrami (France) C Pioline	5	2
4	(Argentina) L Arnold (Argentina) G Etlis	2	6^{3}
(United States) **J Blake** (United States) **A Roddick**	**6**	**7^{7}**
(Argentina) M García (Argentina) M Rodríguez	4	3
(United States) **R Leach** (United States) **B MacPhie**	**6**	**6**
ALT	(Switzerland) Y Allegro (Switzerland) M Chiudinelli	6^{2}	**6**	3
2	(United States) **B Bryan** (United States) **M Bryan**	**7^{7}**	4	**6**

Semifinals
1	(The Bahamas) **M Knowles** (Canada) **D Nestor**	w/o
(United States) J Blake (United States) A Roddick
(United States) R Leach (United States) B MacPhie	4	4
2	(United States) **B Bryan** (United States) **M Bryan**	**6**	**6**

Final
1	(The Bahamas) Mark Knowles (Canada) Daniel Nestor	6^{1}	5
2	(United States) **Bob Bryan** (United States) **Mike Bryan**	**7^{7}**	**7**
