= 2002 Davidoff Swiss Indoors – Singles =

Singles
- 2002 Davidoff Swiss Indoors

Final
- Champion: (Argentina) David Nalbandian
- Runner-up: (Chile) Fernando González
- Score: 6–4, 6–3, 6–2

Details
- Draw: 32 (4Q/3WC/1LL)
- Seeds: 8

Events
Singles	Doubles
← 2001 ·	Swiss Indoors	· 2003 →

Tim Henman was the defending champion but lost in the quarterfinals to David Nalbandian.

Nalbandian won in the final 6–4, 6–3, 6–2 against Fernando González.

== Seeds ==
A champion seed is indicated in bold text while text in italics indicates the round in which that seed was eliminated.

1. (United Kingdom) Tim Henman (quarterfinals)
2. (Spain) Juan Carlos Ferrero (semifinals)
3. (Switzerland) Roger Federer (semifinals)
4. (Spain) Albert Costa (first round)
5. (United States) Andy Roddick (quarterfinals)
6. (Argentina) **David Nalbandian (champion)**
7. (Chile) Fernando González (final)
8. (Spain) Àlex Corretja (first round)

== Draw ==
=== Key ===
- Q = Qualifier
- WC = Wild card
- LL = Lucky loser
- Alt = Alternate
- SE = Special exempt
- PR = Protected ranking
- ITF = ITF entry
- JE = Junior exempt
- w/o = Walkover
- r = Retired
- d = Defaulted
- SR = Special ranking
- NB: The Final was the best of 5 sets while all other rounds were the best of 3 sets.

=== Final ===
Final
6	(Argentina) **David Nalbandian**	**6**	**6**	**6**
7	(Chile) Fernando González	4	3	2

=== Section 1 ===
First round
1	(United Kingdom) **T Henman**	**6**	**6**
Q	(France) C Pioline	1	4
(France) **N Escudé**	**7^{7}**
(Russia) N Davydenko	6^{5}	r
(Argentina) J Acasuso	1	4
(Argentina) **A Calleri**	**6**	**6**
Q	(France) O Mutis	6^{3}	0^{r}
6	(Argentina) **D Nalbandian**	**7^{7}**	1
3	(Switzerland) **R Federer**	**6**	**6**
LL	(Netherlands) M Verkerk	3	3
Q	(Germany) **A Waske**	6^{5}	**6**	**6**
WC	(Switzerland) G Bastl	**7^{7}**	3	4
(United States) **J Blake**	**6**	**7**
(Spain) D Ferrer	3	5
(Belgium) X Malisse	4	3
5	(United States) **A Roddick**	**6**	**6**

Second round
1	(United Kingdom) **T Henman**	1	**6**	**6**
(France) N Escudé	**6**	3	2
(Argentina) A Calleri	2	0^{r}
6	(Argentina) **D Nalbandian**	**6**	3
3	(Switzerland) **R Federer**	**6**	**7^{7}**
Q	(Germany) A Waske	3	6^{1}
(United States) J Blake	6^{6}	3
5	(United States) **A Roddick**	**7^{8}**	**6**

Quarterfinals
1	(United Kingdom) T Henman	**6**	6^{5}	2
6	(Argentina) **D Nalbandian**	3	**7^{7}**	**6**
3	(Switzerland) **R Federer**	**7^{7}**	**6**
5	(United States) A Roddick	6^{5}	1

Semifinals
6	(Argentina) **D Nalbandian**	6^{2}	**7**	**6**
3	(Switzerland) R Federer	**7^{7}**	5	3

=== Section 2 ===
First round
7	(Chile) **F González**	3	**7**	**6**
(Italy) D Sanguinetti	**6**	5	2
(Ecuador) **N Lapentti**	**6**	**6**
(Spain) F Vicente	3	2
(France) J Boutter	3	4
(France) **A Clément**	**6**	**6**
(Romania) **A Voinea**	**6**	**6**
4	(Spain) A Costa	3	3
8	(Spain) À Corretja	4	**7**	1
WC	(Switzerland) **I Heuberger**	**6**	5	**6**
(Germany) L Burgsmüller	**7^{7}**	2	4
(Spain) **F Mantilla**	6^{2}	**6**	**6**
(Hungary) A Sávolt	4	1
Q	(France) **N Thomann**	**6**	**6**
WC	(Switzerland) M Rosset	6^{11}	6^{4}
2	(Spain) **J C Ferrero**	**7^{13}**	**7^{7}**

Second round
7	(Chile) **F González**	**6**	**7^{7}**
(Ecuador) N Lapentti	4	6^{3}
(France) **A Clément**	**6**	**6**
(Romania) A Voinea	3	4
WC	(Switzerland) I Heuberger	1	6^{2}
(Spain) **F Mantilla**	**6**	**7^{7}**
Q	(France) N Thomann	4	2
2	(Spain) **J C Ferrero**	**6**	**6**

Quarterfinals
7	(Chile) **F González**	**7^{7}**	4	**7**
(France) A Clément	6^{4}	**6**	5
(Spain) F Mantilla	**6**	3	6^{5}
2	(Spain) **J C Ferrero**	2	**6**	**7^{7}**

Semifinals
7	(Chile) **F González**	**6**	4	**6**
2	(Spain) J C Ferrero	4	**6**	1

== Qualifying ==
=== Qualifying seeds ===
1. (Austria) Jürgen Melzer (second round)
2. (Netherlands) Martin Verkerk (qualifying competition, **lucky loser**)
3. (France) **Olivier Mutis (qualified)**
4. (France) Jérôme Golmard (first round)
5. (Belgium) Christophe Rochus (second round)
6. (France) **Cédric Pioline (qualified)**
7. (France) Grégory Carraz (second round)
8. (Italy) Giorgio Galimberti (qualifying competition)

=== Qualifiers ===
1. (France) **Nicolas Thomann**
2. (France) **Cédric Pioline**
3. (France) **Olivier Mutis**
4. (Germany) **Alexander Waske**

=== Lucky loser ===
1. (Netherlands) **Martin Verkerk** (replaced (Switzerland) Michel Kratochvil)

=== Qualifying draw ===
==== First qualifier ====
First round
1	**(Austria) Jürgen Melzer**	**6**	**7^{8}**
WC	(Germany) Daniel Elsner	3	6^{6}
**(France) Nicolas Thomann**	**6**	**6**
(Austria) Alexander Peya	2	1
**(Belgium) Gilles Elseneer**	**6**	**6**
(Germany) Markus Hantschk	1	3
(Germany) Jakub Herm-Záhlava	**6**	4	2
8	**(Italy) Giorgio Galimberti**	2	**6**	**6**

Second round
1	(Austria) Jürgen Melzer	2	6^{9}
**(France) Nicolas Thomann**	**6**	**7^{11}**
(Belgium) Gilles Elseneer	4	**6**	4
8	**(Italy) Giorgio Galimberti**	**6**	2	**6**

Qualifying competition
**(France) Nicolas Thomann**	**6**	**7^{8}**
8	(Italy) Giorgio Galimberti	4	6^{6}

==== Second qualifier ====
First round
2	**(Netherlands) Martin Verkerk**	**6**	**6**
WC	(Switzerland) Stéphane Bohli	3	4
**(Germany) Michael Berrer**	**7**	**6**
(Czech Republic) Tomáš Zíb	5	1
**(Argentina) Gastón Etlis**	**7**	**6**
(Italy) Renzo Furlan	5	3
(Czech Republic) Jiří Vaněk	**6**	3	4
6	**(France) Cédric Pioline**	4	**6**	**6**

Second round
2	**(Netherlands) Martin Verkerk**	**6**	4	**6**
(Germany) Michael Berrer	4	**6**	4
(Argentina) Gastón Etlis	**6**	0	5
6	**(France) Cédric Pioline**	2	**6**	**7**

Qualifying competition
2	(Netherlands) Martin Verkerk	1	**6**	1
6	**(France) Cédric Pioline**	**6**	3	**6**

==== Third qualifier ====
First round
3	**(France) Olivier Mutis**	6^{5}	**7^{7}**	**6**
WC	(Switzerland) Jean-Claude Scherrer	**7^{7}**	6^{2}	2
(France) Lionel Roux	**7^{7}**	6^{2}	5
**(Germany) Björn Phau**	6^{5}	**7^{7}**	**7**
**(France) Richard Gasquet**	**6**	**6**
(Switzerland) Roman Valent	1	4
WC	(Switzerland) Michael Lammer	4	6^{4}
7	**(France) Grégory Carraz**	**6**	**7^{7}**

Second round
3	**(France) Olivier Mutis**	**6**	**6**
' (Germany) Björn Phau	3	2
**(France) Richard Gasquet**	4	**7^{8}**	**7**
7	(France) Grégory Carraz	**6**	6^{6}	5

Qualifying competition
3	**(France) Olivier Mutis**	3	**6**	**7**
(France) Richard Gasquet	**6**	3	5

==== Fourth qualifier ====
First round
4	(France) Jérôme Golmard	3	6^{3}
**(Switzerland) Yves Allegro**	**6**	**7^{7}**
(France) Florent Serra	6^{6}	3
**(Germany) Alexander Waske**	**7^{8}**	**6**
**(France) Jean-François Bachelot**	**6**	**6**
(Switzerland) Marco Chiudinelli	3	3
(Italy) Stefano Pescosolido	5	**6**	4
5	**(Belgium) Christophe Rochus**	**7**	4	**6**

Second round
(Switzerland) Yves Allegro	4	2
**(Germany) Alexander Waske**	**6**	**6**
**(France) Jean-François Bachelot**	**7^{7}**	4	**6**
5	(Belgium) Christophe Rochus	6^{4}	**6**	3

Qualifying competition
**(Germany) Alexander Waske**	**6**	6^{5}	**6**
(France) Jean-François Bachelot	4	**7^{7}**	3
