= 2001 Davidoff Swiss Indoors – Singles =

Singles
- 2001 Davidoff Swiss Indoors

Final
- Champion: (United Kingdom) Tim Henman
- Runner-up: (Switzerland) Roger Federer
- Score: 6–3, 6–4, 6–2

Details
- Draw: 32 (4 Q / 2 WC )
- Seeds: 8

Events
Singles	Doubles
← 2000 ·	Swiss Indoors	· 2002 →

Thomas Enqvist was the defending champion but did not compete that year. Tim Henman won in the final 6–3, 6–4, 6–2 against Roger Federer.

== Seeds ==
A champion seed is indicated in bold text while text in italics indicates the round in which that seed was eliminated.

1. (Brazil) Gustavo Kuerten (first round)
2. (United Kingdom) **Tim Henman (champion)**
3. (Spain) Àlex Corretja (first round)
4. (Switzerland) Roger Federer (final)
5. (France) Arnaud Clément (second round)
6. (United States) Andy Roddick (quarterfinals)
7. (Spain) Carlos Moyá (semifinals)
8. (United States) Jan-Michael Gambill (first round)

== Draw ==
=== Key ===
- Q = Qualifier
- WC = Wild card
- LL = Lucky loser
- Alt = Alternate
- ITF = ITF entry
- PR = Protected ranking
- SR = Special ranking
- SE = Special exempt
- JE = Junior exempt
- JR = Junior Accelerator Programme entrant
- CO = College Accelerator Programme entrant
- NG = Next Gen Accelerator Program entrant
- w/o = Walkover
- r = Retired
- d = Defaulted
- NB: The final was the best of 5 sets while all other rounds were the best of 3 sets.

=== Final ===
Final
4	(Switzerland) Roger Federer	3	4	2
2	(United Kingdom) **Tim Henman**	**6**	**6**	**6**

=== Section 1 ===
First round
1	(Brazil) G Kuerten	6^{3}	2
(France) **J Boutter**	**7^{7}**	**6**
(Romania) **A Pavel**	**6**	6^{5}	**6**
(Croatia) I Ljubičić	4	**7^{7}**	3
(Czech Republic) **B Ulihrach**	**6**	3	**6**
(Ecuador) N Lapentti	4	**6**	3
WC	(Switzerland) **G Bastl**	**6**
8	(United States) J-M Gambill	4	r
4	(Switzerland) **R Federer**	**6**	**6**
(Spain) A Costa	3	3
(Belgium) **X Malisse**	**6**	6^{10}	**6**
Q	(Czech Republic) L Friedl	3	**7^{12}**	2
Q	(Federal Republic of Yugoslavia) **N Zimonjić**	4	**6**	**6**
(Spain) F Vicente	**6**	3	2
Q	(France) S Huet	2	**6**	6^{5}
6	(United States) **A Roddick**	**6**	3	**7^{7}**

Second round
(France) **J Boutter**	4	**6**	**6**
(Romania) A Pavel	**6**	4	0
(Czech Republic) B Ulihrach	6^{3}	6^{1}
WC	(Switzerland) **G Bastl**	**7^{7}**	**7^{7}**
4	(Switzerland) **R Federer**	**6**	**6**
(Belgium) X Malisse	3	4
Q	(Federal Republic of Yugoslavia) N Zimonjić	4	6^{4}
6	(United States) **A Roddick**	**6**	**7^{7}**

Quarterfinals
(France) **J Boutter**	2	**7^{7}**	**7^{9}**
WC	(Switzerland) G Bastl	**6**	6^{2}	6^{7}
4	(Switzerland) **R Federer**	3	**6**	**7^{7}**
6	(United States) A Roddick	**6**	3	6^{5}

Semifinals
(France) J Boutter	6^{3}	4
4	(Switzerland) **R Federer**	**7^{7}**	**6**

=== Section 2 ===
First round
7	(Spain) **C Moyá**	**7^{7}**	**6**
(Italy) D Sanguinetti	6^{2}	4
(Spain) J Balcells	4	**6**	2
Q	(France) **N Thomann**	**6**	2	**6**
LL	(Russia) **N Davydenko**	**6**	**6**
(Spain) G Blanco	1	4
WC	(Switzerland) **M Rosset**	**6**	3	**6**
3	(Spain) À Corretja	4	**6**	1
5	(France) **A Clément**	**6**	**6**
(Argentina) G Gaudio	4	1
(Spain) A Portas	**7**	6^{1}	1
(Switzerland) **M Kratochvil**	5	**7^{7}**	**6**
(Italy) **A Gaudenzi**	**7^{7}**	**6**
(Spain) T Robredo	6^{3}	4
(France) A Dupuis	4	1
2	(United Kingdom) **T Henman**	**6**	**6**

Second round
7	(Spain) **C Moyá**	**7^{7}**	**6**
Q	(France) N Thomann	6^{4}	4
LL	(Russia) **N Davydenko**	**7**	**6**
WC	(Switzerland) M Rosset	5	1
5	(France) A Clément	3	**6**	6^{6}
(Switzerland) **M Kratochvil**	**6**	1	**7^{8}**
(Italy) A Gaudenzi	2	1
2	(United Kingdom) **T Henman**	**6**	**6**

Quarterfinals
7	(Spain) **C Moyá**	**7^{7}**	**7^{7}**
LL	(Russia) N Davydenko	6^{4}	6^{3}
(Switzerland) M Kratochvil	0	1
2	(United Kingdom) **T Henman**	**6**	**6**

Semifinals
7	(Spain) C Moyá	1	4
2	(United Kingdom) **T Henman**	**6**	**6**
