= 2000 Davidoff Swiss Indoors =

- Date: 24–29 October
- Edition: 31st
- Category: International Series
- Draw: 32S / 16D
- Prize money: $975,000
- Surface: Carpet / indoor
- Location: Basel, Switzerland
- Venue: St. Jakobshalle

Champions

Singles
- (Sweden) Thomas Enqvist

Doubles
- (United States) Donald Johnson / (South Africa) Piet Norval
- Swiss Indoors

The 2000 Davidoff Swiss Indoors was a men's tennis tournament played on indoor carpet courts at the St. Jakobshalle in Basel in Switzerland and was part of the International Series of the 2000 ATP Tour. The tournament ran from 24 October through 29 October 2000. Second-seeded Thomas Enqvist won the singles title.

== Finals ==
=== Singles ===
(Sweden) Thomas Enqvist defeated (Switzerland) Roger Federer 6–2, 4–6, 7–6^{(7–4)}, 1–6, 6–1

- It was Enqvist's 2nd title of the year and the 18th of his career.

=== Doubles ===
(United States) Donald Johnson / (South Africa) Piet Norval defeated (Switzerland) Roger Federer / (Slovakia) Dominik Hrbatý 7–6^{(11–9)}, 4–6, 7–6^{(7–4)}

- It was Johnson's 4th title of the year and the 13th of his career. It was Norval's 3rd title of the year and the 13th of his career.
