= 2006 Davidoff Swiss Indoors – Doubles =

Doubles
- 2006 Davidoff Swiss Indoors

Final
- Champions: (The Bahamas) Mark Knowles (Canada) Daniel Nestor
- Runners-up: (Poland) Mariusz Fyrstenberg (Poland) Marcin Matkowski
- Score: 4–6, 6–4, [10–8]

Details
- Draw: 16
- Seeds: 4

Events
Singles	Doubles
← 2005 ·	Swiss Indoors	· 2007 →

Agustín Calleri and Fernando González were the defending champions, but Gonzalez chose not to participate, and only Calleri competed that year.

Calleri partnered with Juan Martín del Potro, but they were forced to withdraw due to a gluteal strain for Calleri, before their first round match against Mark Knowles and Daniel Nestor.

Mark Knowles and Daniel Nestor won in the final 4–6, 6–4, [10–8], against Mariusz Fyrstenberg and Marcin Matkowski.

== Seeds ==
1. (The Bahamas) Mark Knowles / (Canada) Daniel Nestor (champions)
2. (Poland) Mariusz Fyrstenberg / (Poland) Marcin Matkowski (final)
3. (South Africa) Chris Haggard / (Czech Republic) Petr Pála (first round)
4. (Switzerland) Yves Allegro / (Sweden) Robert Lindstedt (first round)

== Draw ==
=== Key ===
- Q = Qualifier
- WC = Wild card
- LL = Lucky loser
- Alt = Alternate
- SE = Special exempt
- PR = Protected ranking
- ITF = ITF entry
- JE = Junior exempt
- w/o = Walkover
- r = Retired
- d = Defaulted
- SR = Special ranking

=== Draw ===
First round
1	(The Bahamas) M Knowles (Canada) D Nestor	w/o
(Argentina) A Calleri (Argentina) JM del Potro
(United States) C Drake (Czech Republic) T Zíb	2	4
(United States) E Butorac (United States) T Parrott	6	6
3	(South Africa) C Haggard (Czech Republic) P Pála	6^{3}	7^{7}	[7]
(Argentina) J Acasuso (Argentina) JI Chela	7^{7}	6^{5}	[10]
(Italy) S Bolelli (Belgium) C Rochus	3	6^{6}
WC	(Switzerland) S Wawrinka (Switzerland) S Bohli	6	7^{8}
(Germany) B Becker (Germany) M Kohlmann	6	6
WC	(Switzerland) M Chiudinelli (Switzerland) J-C Scherrer	3	4
(Spain) D Ferrer (Spain) Montañés	6	6
4	(Switzerland) Y Allegro (Sweden) R Lindstedt	2	4
ALT	(Germany) F Moser (Germany) P Gruendler	6^{5}	7^{8}	[8]
(Argentina) D Nalbandian (Argentina) S Prieto	7^{7}	6^{6}	[10]
(Spain) R Ramírez Hidalgo (Italy) F Volandro	2	3
2	(Poland) M Fyrstenberg (Poland) M Matkowski	6	6

Quarterfinals
1	(The Bahamas) M Knowles (Canada) D Nestor	7^{7}	6
(United States) E Butorac (United States) T Parrott	6^{4}	2
(Argentina) J Acasuso (Argentina) JI Chela	6	6
WC	(Switzerland) S Wawrinka (Switzerland) S Bohli	2	1
(Germany) B Becker (Germany) M Kohlmann	1	4
(Spain) D Ferrer (Spain) Montañés	6	6
(Argentina) D Nalbandian (Argentina) S Prieto	6	3	[5]
2	(Poland) M Fyrstenberg (Poland) M Matkowski	3	6	[10]

Semifinals
1	(The Bahamas) M Knowles (Canada) D Nestor	6	6
(Argentina) J Acasuso (Argentina) JI Chela	4	3
(Spain) D Ferrer (Spain) Montañés	2	1
2	(Poland) M Fyrstenberg (Poland) M Matkowski	6	6

Final
1	(The Bahamas) M Knowles (Canada) D Nestor	4	6	[10]
2	(Poland) M Fyrstenberg (Poland) M Matkowski	6	4	[8]
