= 2007 Davidoff Swiss Indoors – Doubles =

Doubles
- 2007 Davidoff Swiss Indoors

Final
- Champions: (United States) Bob Bryan (United States) Mike Bryan
- Runners-up: (United States) James Blake (The Bahamas) Mark Knowles
- Score: 6–1, 6–1

Details
- Draw: 16
- Seeds: 4

Events
Singles	Doubles
← 2006 ·	Swiss Indoors	· 2008 →

Mark Knowles and Daniel Nestor were the defending champions, but Nestor chose not to participate, and only Knowles competed that year.
Knowles partnered with James Blake, but Bob Bryan and Mike Bryan defeated them 6–1, 6–1, in the final.

== Seeds ==
1. (United States) Bob Bryan / (United States) Mike Bryan (champions)
2. (Australia) Paul Hanley / (Zimbabwe) Kevin Ullyett (semifinals)
3. (Sweden) Simon Aspelin / (Austria) Julian Knowle (first round)
4. (Poland) Mariusz Fyrstenberg / (Poland) Marcin Matkowski (first round)

== Draw ==
=== Key ===
- Q = Qualifier
- WC = Wild card
- LL = Lucky loser
- Alt = Alternate
- SE = Special exempt
- PR = Protected ranking
- ITF = ITF entry
- JE = Junior exempt
- w/o = Walkover
- r = Retired
- d = Defaulted
- SR = Special ranking

=== Draw ===
First round
1	(United States) B Bryan (United States) M Bryan	6	6
ALT	(United States) A Delic (United States) M Russell	3	4
(Czech Republic) T Berdych (Czech Republic) P Pála	5	7	[8]
(Argentina) A Calleri (Spain) Ó Hernández	7	5	[10]
4	(Poland) M Fyrstenberg (Poland) M Matkowski	6	3	[8]
(Cyprus) M Baghdatis (Switzerland) S Wawrinka	2	6	[10]
WC	(Switzerland) R Federer (Switzerland) Y Allegro	6	3	[10]
(Argentina) JI Chela (Argentina) JM del Potro	4	6	[8]
(Czech Republic) T Cibulec (Czech Republic) D Škoch	6^{4}	4
(Sweden) R Lindstedt (Finland) J Nieminen	7^{7}	6
(United States) J Blake (The Bahamas) M Knowles	5	7^{9}	[10]
3	(Sweden) S Aspelin (Austria) J Knowle	7	6^{7}	[4]
(Germany) T Berhend (Germany) C Kas	5	2
(Argentina) G Cañas (Chile) F González	7	6
(Switzerland) G Bastl (Switzerland) J-C Scherrer	5	4
2	(Australia) P Hanley (Zimbabwe) K Ullyett	7	6

Quarterfinals
1	(United States) B Bryan (United States) M Bryan	6	6
(Argentina) A Calleri (Spain) Ó Hernández	2	1
(Cyprus) M Baghdatis (Switzerland) S Wawrinka	6^{2}	6	[10]
WC	(Switzerland) R Federer (Switzerland) Y Allegro	7^{7}	2	[3]
(Sweden) R Lindstedt (Finland) J Nieminen	4	5
(United States) J Blake (The Bahamas) M Knowles	6	7
(Argentina) G Cañas (Chile) F González	5	3
2	(Australia) P Hanley (Zimbabwe) K Ullyett	7	6

Semifinals
1	(United States) B Bryan (United States) M Bryan	6	6^{5}	[10]
(Cyprus) M Baghdatis (Switzerland) S Wawrinka	4	7^{7}	[4]
(United States) J Blake (The Bahamas) M Knowles	7	6^{5}	[12]
2	(Australia) P Hanley (Zimbabwe) K Ullyett	5	7^{7}	[10]

Final
1	(United States) B Bryan (United States) M Bryan	6	6
(United States) J Blake (The Bahamas) M Knowles	1	1
