= 2007 Davidoff Swiss Indoors – Singles =

Singles
- 2007 Davidoff Swiss Indoors

Final
- Champion: (Switzerland) Roger Federer
- Runner-up: (Finland) Jarkko Nieminen
- Score: 6–3, 6–4

Details
- Draw: 32 (4 Q / 3 WC )
- Seeds: 8

Events
Singles	Doubles
← 2006 ·	Swiss Indoors	· 2008 →

Roger Federer was the defending champion, and won in the final 6–3, 6–4, against Jarkko Nieminen.

== Seeds ==
1. (Switzerland) Roger Federer (champion)
2. (Chile) Fernando González (quarterfinals)
3. (Spain) David Ferrer (first round)
4. (United States) James Blake (second round)
5. (Czech Republic) Tomáš Berdych (quarterfinals)
6. (Argentina) Guillermo Cañas (second round)
7. (Argentina) Juan Ignacio Chela (first round)
8. (France) Paul-Henri Mathieu (quarterfinals)

== Draw ==
=== Key ===
- Q = Qualifier
- WC = Wild card
- LL = Lucky loser
- Alt = Alternate
- ITF = ITF entry
- PR = Protected ranking
- SR = Special ranking
- SE = Special exempt
- JE = Junior exempt
- JR = Junior Accelerator Programme entrant
- CO = College Accelerator Programme entrant
- NG = Next Gen Accelerator Program entrant
- w/o = Walkover
- r = Retired
- d = Defaulted

=== Finals ===
Semifinals
1	(Switzerland) Roger Federer	7^{8}	7^{7}
(Croatia) Ivo Karlović	6^{6}	6^{5}
(Cyprus) Marcos Baghdatis	6^{4}	2
(Finland) Jarkko Nieminen	7^{7}	6

Final
1	(Switzerland) Roger Federer	6	6
(Finland) Jarkko Nieminen	3	4

=== Top half ===
First round
1	(Switzerland) R Federer	6	3	6
(Germany) M Berrer	1	6	3
(Argentina) JM del Potro	5
(United States) M Russell	2^{r}
SE	(Germany) N Kiefer	6	6
(Argentina) C Berlocq	1	1
(Austria) S Koubek	6	6
7	(Argentina) JI Chela	3	4
4/WC	(United States) J Blake	6	6
(Spain) Ó Hernández	3	4
(Croatia) I Karlović	6	6
WC	(Switzerland) M Chiudinelli	3	2
(Argentina) D Nalbandian	6^{5}	2
(Switzerland) S Wawrinka	7^{7}	6
(Spain) F López	6^{4}	6	3
5	(Czech Republic) T Berdych	7^{7}	3	6

Second round
1	(Switzerland) R Federer	6	6
(Argentina) JM del Potro	1	4
SE	(Germany) N Kiefer	6	6
(Austria) S Koubek	3	2
4/WC	(United States) J Blake	6	6^{4}	4
(Croatia) I Karlović	4	7^{7}	6
(Switzerland) S Wawrinka	5	4
5	(Czech Republic) T Berdych	7	6

Quarterfinals
1	(Switzerland) R Federer	6	6
SE	(Germany) N Kiefer	3	2
(Croatia) I Karlović	6^{5}	7^{7}	7^{15}
5	(Czech Republic) T Berdych	7^{7}	6^{2}	6^{13}

Semifinals
1	(Switzerland) R Federer	7^{8}	7^{7}
(Croatia) I Karlović	6^{6}	6^{5}

=== Bottom half ===
First round
8/WC	(France) P-H Mathieu	6	6
(Canada) F Dancevic	3	1
(United States) A Delić	4	3
Q	(Russia) A Golubev	6	6
(Spain) Montañés	2	2
(Cyprus) M Baghdatis	6	6
(Argentina) A Calleri	6	7^{7}
3	(Spain) D Ferrer	4	6^{3}
6	(Argentina) G Cañas	6	6
(Argentina) J Acasuso	4	3
(United States) R Ginepri	6	4	5
(Finland) J Nieminen	3	6	7
Q	(Germany) J Reister	0	3
Q	(Croatia) R Karanušić	6	6
Q	(France) J Haehnel	6^{5}	4
2	(Chile) F González	7^{7}	6

Second round
8/WC	(France) P-H Mathieu	6^{7}	6	6
Q	(Russia) A Golubev	7^{9}	4	1
(Cyprus) M Baghdatis	6^{1}	6	6
(Argentina) A Calleri	7^{7}	3	3
6	(Argentina) G Cañas	4	6	5
(Finland) J Nieminen	6	3	7
Q	(Croatia) R Karanušić	4	6^{5}
2	(Chile) F González	6	7^{7}

Quarterfinals
8/WC	(France) P-H Mathieu	2	6^{5}
(Cyprus) M Baghdatis	6	7^{7}
(Finland) J Nieminen	6	7
2	(Chile) F González	3	5

Semifinals
(Cyprus) M Baghdatis	6^{4}	2
(Finland) J Nieminen	7^{7}	6
