= 2008 Davidoff Swiss Indoors =

- Date: 20–26 October
- Edition: 39th
- Category: International Series
- Draw: 32S / 16D
- Prize money: €870,000
- Surface: Hard / indoors
- Location: Basel, Switzerland
- Venue: St. Jakobshalle

Champions

Singles
- (Switzerland) Roger Federer

Doubles
- (India) Mahesh Bhupathi / (The Bahamas) Mark Knowles
| ← 2007 · | Swiss Indoors | · 2009 → |

The 2008 Davidoff Swiss Indoors was a men's tennis tournament played on indoor hard courts. It was the 39th edition of the event known that year as the Davidoff Swiss Indoors, and was part of the International Series of the 2008 ATP Tour. It took place at the St. Jakobshalle in Basel, Switzerland, from 20 October through 26 October 2008.

The singles field was led by ATP No. 2, Olympic doubles gold medalist, US Open, Estoril and Halle titlist, two-time Basel defending champion Roger Federer, Buenos Aires and Stockholm winner David Nalbandian, and Stuttgart, Kitzbühel, Los Angeles and Washington titlist Juan Martín del Potro. Also lined up were Delray Beach and Houston runner-up James Blake, Doha and Rome Masters finalist Stanislas Wawrinka, Igor Andreev, Tomáš Berdych and Mardy Fish.

First-seeded and defending champion Roger Federer won the singles title.

== Finals ==
=== Singles ===
(Switzerland) Roger Federer defeated (Argentina) David Nalbandian, 6–3, 6–4

- It was Roger Federer's 4th title of the year, and his 57th overall. It was his 3rd consecutive title at the event.

=== Doubles ===
(India) Mahesh Bhupathi / (The Bahamas) Mark Knowles defeated (Germany) Christopher Kas / (Germany) Philipp Kohlschreiber, 6–3, 6–3
