= 2007 Davidoff Swiss Indoors =

- Date: 22–28 October
- Edition: 38th
- Category: International Series
- Draw: 32S / 16D
- Prize money: $975,000
- Surface: Hard / indoors
- Location: Basel, Switzerland
- Venue: St. Jakobshalle

Champions

Singles
- (Switzerland) Roger Federer

Doubles
- (United States) Bob Bryan / (United States) Mike Bryan
| ← 2006 · | Swiss Indoors | · 2008 → |

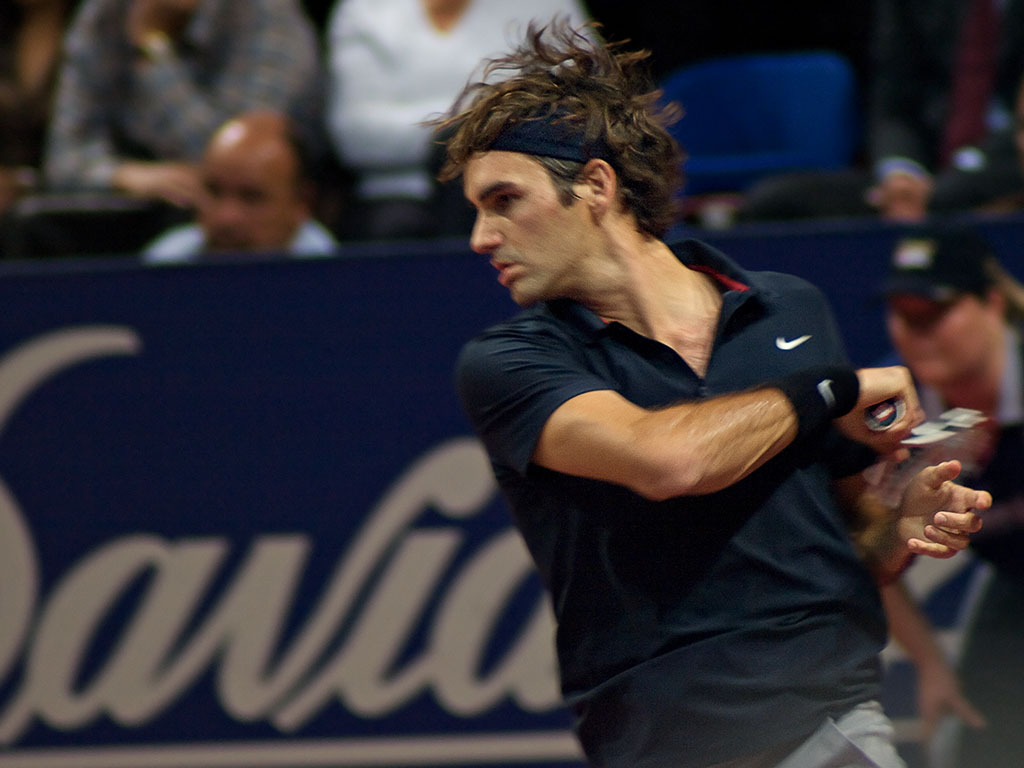
Singles champion Roger Federer

The 2007 Davidoff Swiss Indoors was a tennis tournament played on indoor hard courts. It was the 38th edition of the event known that year as the Davidoff Swiss Indoors, and was part of the International Series of the 2007 ATP Tour. It took place at the St. Jakobshalle in Basel, Switzerland, from 22 October through 28 October 2007.

The singles field was led by World No. 1, Australian Open, Wimbledon and US Open winner, Basel defending champion Roger Federer, Australian Open runner-up, Beijing titlist, and 2005 Basel winner Fernando González, and US Open semifinalist, Auckland, Tokyo and Båstad champion David Ferrer. Also competing were Sydney and New Haven titlist James Blake, Halle winner Tomáš Berdych, Guillermo Cañas, Juan Ignacio Chela and Paul-Henri Mathieu.

== Finals ==
=== Singles ===
(Switzerland) Roger Federer defeated (Finland) Jarkko Nieminen, 6–3, 6–4

- It was Roger Federer's 7th title of the year, and his 52nd overall. It was his 2nd consecutive win at the event.

=== Doubles ===
(United States) Bob Bryan / (United States) Mike Bryan defeated (United States) James Blake / (The Bahamas) Mark Knowles, 6–1, 6–1
