= 2008 Davidoff Swiss Indoors – Singles =

Singles
- 2008 Davidoff Swiss Indoors

Final
- Champion: (Switzerland) Roger Federer
- Runner-up: (Argentina) David Nalbandian
- Score: 6–3, 6–4

Details
- Draw: 32 (4Q / 3WC)
- Seeds: 8

Events
Singles	Doubles
← 2007 ·	Swiss Indoors	· 2009 →

First-seeded Roger Federer was the defending champion, and won in the final 6–3, 6–4, against David Nalbandian.

== Seeds ==
1. (Switzerland) Roger Federer (champion)
2. (Argentina) David Nalbandian (final)
3. (Argentina) Juan Martín del Potro (semifinals)
4. (United States) James Blake (quarterfinals)
5. (Switzerland) Stanislas Wawrinka (first round)
6. (Russia) Igor Andreev (quarterfinals)
7. (Czech Republic) Tomáš Berdych (first round)
8. (United States) Mardy Fish (second round)

== Draw ==
=== Key ===
- Q = Qualifier
- WC = Wild card
- LL = Lucky loser
- Alt = Alternate
- SE = Special exempt
- PR = Protected ranking
- ITF = ITF entry
- JE = Junior exempt
- w/o = Walkover
- r = Retired
- d = Defaulted
- SR = Special ranking

=== Finals ===
Semifinals
1	(Switzerland) Roger Federer	6	6
(Spain) Feliciano López	3	2
3	(Argentina) Juan Martín del Potro	4	4
2	(Argentina) David Nalbandian	6	6

Final
1	(Switzerland) Roger Federer	6	6
2	(Argentina) David Nalbandian	3	4

=== Top half ===
First round
1	(Switzerland) R Federer	6	6^{6}	6
(United States) B Reynolds	3	7^{8}	3
(Argentina) E Schwank	2	4
(Finland) J Nieminen	6	6
(Spain) M Granollers	6	4	6
(Cyprus) M Baghdatis	2	6	2
(Italy) S Bolelli	6	7
7	(Czech Republic) T Berdych	4	5
4	(United States) J Blake	3	6	6
(Germany) N Kiefer	6	3	4
(Spain) Ó Hernández	7^{8}	6^{5}	6
Q	(Czech Republic) L Dlouhý	6^{6}	7^{7}	1
(Spain) F López	7^{7}	7^{9}
WC	(Switzerland) M Chiudinelli	6^{5}	6^{7}
(Argentina) A Calleri	6^{5}	2
8	(United States) M Fish	7^{7}	6

Second round
1	(Switzerland) R Federer	7^{8}	7^{7}
(Finland) J Nieminen	6^{6}	6^{1}
(Spain) M Granollers	4	2
(Italy) S Bolelli	6	6
4	(United States) J Blake	6^{4}	6	6
(Spain) Ó Hernández	7^{7}	2	4
(Spain) F López	7^{11}	6
8	(United States) M Fish	6^{9}	4

Quarterfinals
1	(Switzerland) R Federer	6	6
(Italy) S Bolelli	2	3
4	(United States) J Blake	4	6^{7}
(Spain) F López	6	7^{9}

Semifinals
1	(Switzerland) R Federer	6	6
(Spain) F López	3	2

=== Bottom half ===
First round
6	(Russia) I Andreev	7^{7}	7
(Austria) J Melzer	6^{5}	5
(Germany) D Gremelmayr	4	6^{5}
(Germany) P Kohlschreiber	6	7^{7}
(Argentina) J Acasuso	3	2
WC	(Switzerland) S Bohli	6	6
Q	(Switzerland) G Bastl	2	4
3	(Argentina) JM del Potro	6	6
5	(Switzerland) S Wawrinka	6	6^{5}	6^{5}
Q	(Germany) B Becker	3	7^{7}	7^{7}
LL	(Germany) A Beck	6	6
(France) N Devilder	4	4
Q	(Belgium) K Vliegen	6	6
WC	(Germany) P Petzschner	2	3
(Spain) A Montañés	4	2
2	(Argentina) D Nalbandian	6	6

Second round
6	(Russia) I Andreev	7^{8}	6^{0}	7
(Germany) P Kohlschreiber	6^{6}	7^{7}	5
WC	(Switzerland) S Bohli	3	3
3	(Argentina) JM del Potro	6	6
Q	(Germany) B Becker	3	6	6
LL	(Germany) A Beck	6	3	4
Q	(Belgium) K Vliegen	4	7	6^{4}
2	(Argentina) D Nalbandian	6	5	7^{7}

Quarterfinals
6	(Russia) I Andreev	4	5
3	(Argentina) JM del Potro	6	7
Q	(Germany) B Becker	6^{4}	4
2	(Argentina) D Nalbandian	7^{7}	6

Semifinals
3	(Argentina) JM del Potro	4	4
2	(Argentina) D Nalbandian	6	6
