= 2006 Davidoff Swiss Indoors – Singles =

Singles
- 2006 Davidoff Swiss Indoors

Final
- Champion: (Switzerland) Roger Federer
- Runner-up: (Chile) Fernando González
- Score: 6–3, 6–2, 7–6^{(7–3)}

Details
- Draw: 32 (4 Q / 3 WC )
- Seeds: 8

Events
Singles	Doubles
← 2005 ·	Swiss Indoors	· 2007 →

Roger Federer defeated Fernando González 6–3, 6–2, 7–6^{(7–3)} in the final to win the 2006 singles title at the Davidoff Swiss Indoors tennis tournament.

== Seeds ==
1. (Switzerland) Roger Federer (champion)
2. (Argentina) David Nalbandian (quarterfinals)
3. (Chile) Fernando González (final)
4. (Czech Republic) Tomáš Berdych (withdrew due to an abdominal strain)
5. (Spain) David Ferrer (quarterfinals)
6. (United Kingdom) Andy Murray (withdrew due to a throat infection)
7. (Argentina) José Acasuso (quarterfinals)
8. (Argentina) Agustín Calleri (first round)

== Draw ==
=== Key ===
- Q = Qualifier
- WC = Wild card
- LL = Lucky loser
- Alt = Alternate
- SE = Special exempt
- PR = Protected ranking
- ITF = ITF entry
- JE = Junior exempt
- w/o = Walkover
- r = Retired
- d = Defaulted
- SR = Special ranking

=== Final ===
Final
1	(Switzerland) Roger Federer	6	6	7^{7}
3	(Chile) Fernando González	3	2	6^{3}

=== Top half ===
First round
1	(Switzerland) R Federer	6	6
Q	(Czech Republic) T Zíb	1	2
Q	(Germany) J Reister	6^{4}	2
(Spain) G García López	7^{7}	6
(Czech Republic) J Novák	6^{5}	3
(Czech Republic) J hájek	7^{7}	0^{r}
WC	(Switzerland) M Chiudinelli	7^{7}	3	4
5	(Spain) D Ferrer	6^{1}	6	6
(Argentina) JI Chela	6	7
(Italy) F Volandri	4	5
(Germany) B Becker	6^{4}	6^{4}
(Thailand) P Srichaphan	7^{7}	7^{7}
Q	(France) N Thomann	1	5
(Germany) P Kohlschreiber	6	7
(Spain) A Montañés	4	3
7	(Argentina) J Acasuso	6	6

Second round
1	(Switzerland) R Federer	6	6
(Spain) G García López	2	0
(Czech Republic) J Novák	6	3	3
5	(Spain) D Ferrer	2	6	6
(Argentina) JI Chela	4	3
(Thailand) P Srichaphan	6	6
(Germany) P Kohlschreiber	6^{2}	1
7	(Argentina) J Acasuso	7^{7}	6

Quarterfinals
1	(Switzerland) R Federer	6	7^{16}
5	(Spain) D Ferrer	3	6^{14}
(Thailand) P Srichaphan	7^{7}	6
7	(Argentina) J Acasuso	6^{2}	3

Semifinals
1	(Switzerland) R Federer	6	3	7^{7}
(Thailand) P Srichaphan	4	6	6^{5}

=== Bottom half ===
First round
LL	(Germany) T Clemens	6	3	2
WC	(Argentina) JM del Potro	3	6	6
Q	(Germany) L Burgsmüller	1	4
WC	(Switzerland) G Bastl	6	6
(United States) M Fish	6	6
(Czech Republic) J Vaněk	4	3
LL	(Italy) S Bolelli	6^{3}	7^{7}	6^{3}
3	(Chile) F González	7^{7}	6^{2}	7^{7}
8	(Argentina) A Calleri	6^{6}	2
(Switzerland) S Wawrinka	7^{8}	6
(United Kingdom) T Henman	6	6
(Belgium) C Rochus	2	3
(Spain) R Ramírez Hidalgo	6	6^{5}	1
(Spain) F López	3	7^{7}	6
LL	(Croatia) R Karanušić	2	4
2	(Argentina) D Nalbandian	6	6

Second round
WC	(Argentina) JM del Potro	6	6
WC	(Switzerland) G Bastl	3	2
(United States) M Fish	7^{7}	4	6^{8}
3	(Chile) F González	6^{5}	6	7^{10}
(Switzerland) S Wawrinka	2	7^{7}	6
(United Kingdom) T Henman	6	6^{4}	4
(Spain) F López	7^{7}	3	6^{7}
2	(Argentina) D Nalbandian	6^{4}	6	7^{9}

Quarterfinals
WC	(Argentina) JM del Potro	7	4	4
3	(Chile) F González	5	6	6
(Switzerland) S Wawrinka	7^{9}	6
2	(Argentina) D Nalbandian	6^{7}	2

Semifinals
3	(Chile) F González	6	6
(Switzerland) S Wawrinka	4	4
