= 2006 Davidoff Swiss Indoors =

- Date: 23–29 October
- Edition: 37th
- Category: International Series
- Draw: 32S / 16D
- Prize money: $975,000
- Location: Basel, Switzerland
- Venue: St. Jakobshalle

Champions

Singles
- (Switzerland) Roger Federer

Doubles
- (The Bahamas) Mark Knowles / (Canada) Daniel Nestor
← 2005 ·	Swiss Indoors	· 2007 →

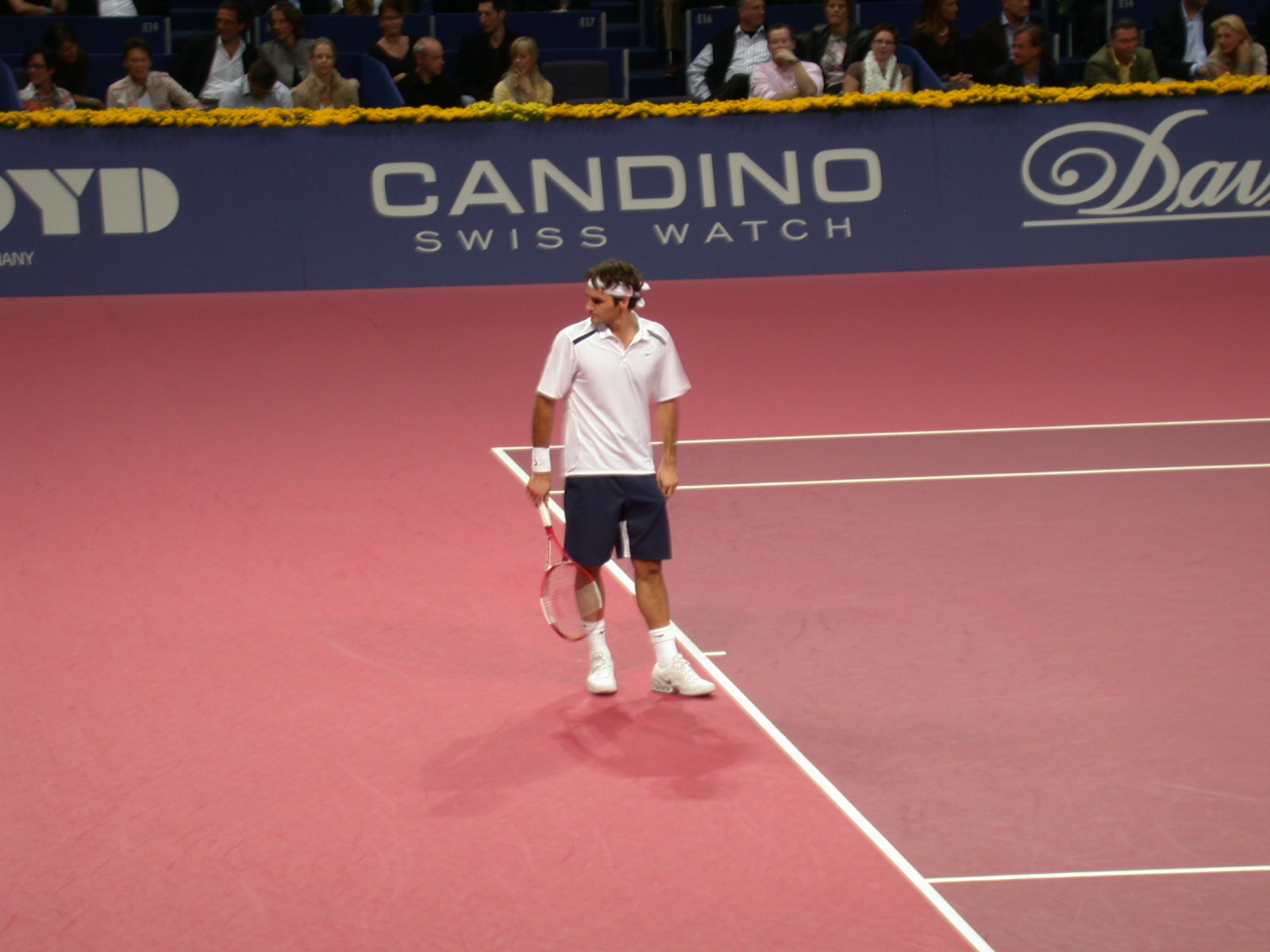
Singles champion Roger Federer

The 2006 Davidoff Swiss Indoors was a men's tennis tournament played on indoor carpet courts. It was the 37th edition of the event known that year as the Davidoff Swiss Indoors, and was part of the International Series of the 2006 ATP Tour. It took place at the St. Jakobshalle in Basel, Switzerland, from 23 October through 29 October 2006.

The announced singles field featured World No. 1, Australian Open, Wimbledon and US Open champion, recent Tokyo titlist, Basel boy Roger Federer, Australian Open and French Open semifinalist, Estoril winner David Nalbandian, and Madrid Masters and Vienna runner-up Fernando González. Also lined up were Halle and Mumbai finalist Tomáš Berdych, Stuttgart winner David Ferrer, Andy Murray, José Acasuso and Agustín Calleri.

== Finals ==
=== Singles ===
(Switzerland) Roger Federer defeated (Chile) Fernando González, 6–3, 6–2, 7–6^{(7–3)}

- It was Roger Federer's 11th title of the year, and his 44th overall.

=== Doubles ===
(The Bahamas) Mark Knowles / (Canada) Daniel Nestor defeated (Poland) Mariusz Fyrstenberg / (Poland) Marcin Matkowski, 4–6, 6–4, [10–8]
