= 2008 Davidoff Swiss Indoors – Doubles =

Doubles
- 2008 Davidoff Swiss Indoors

Final
- Champions: (India) Mahesh Bhupathi (The Bahamas) Mark Knowles
- Runners-up: (Germany) Christopher Kas (Germany) Philipp Kohlschreiber
- Score: 6–3, 6–3

Details
- Draw: 16
- Seeds: 4

Events
Singles	Doubles
← 2007 ·	Swiss Indoors	· 2009 →

Bob Bryan and Mike Bryan were the defending champions, but chose not to participate that year.

Mahesh Bhupathi and Mark Knowles won in the final 6–3, 6–3, against Christopher Kas and Philipp Kohlschreiber.

== Seeds ==
1. (Canada) Daniel Nestor / (Serbia) Nenad Zimonjić (first round)
2. (India) Mahesh Bhupathi / (The Bahamas) Mark Knowles (champions)
3. (Czech Republic) Lukáš Dlouhý / (India) Leander Paes (quarterfinals)
4. (Poland) Mariusz Fyrstenberg / (Poland) Marcin Matkowski (first round)

== Draw ==
=== Key ===
- Q = Qualifier
- WC = Wild card
- LL = Lucky loser
- Alt = Alternate
- SE = Special exempt
- PR = Protected ranking
- ITF = ITF entry
- JE = Junior exempt
- w/o = Walkover
- r = Retired
- d = Defaulted
- SR = Special ranking

=== Draw ===
First round
1	(Canada) D Nestor (Serbia) N Zimonjić	4	6^{3}
(Czech Republic) T Berdych (Germany) N Kiefer	6	7^{7}
(Germany) P Petzschner (Austria) A Peya	3	5
(Argentina) D Nalbandian (Argentina) E Schwank	6	7
3	(Czech Republic) L Dlouhý (India) L Paes	2	6	[10]
(Austria) J Melzer (Australia) T Perry	6	3	[6]
WC	(Switzerland) Y Allegro (Switzerland) J-C Scherrer	2	3
(Germany) C Kas (Germany) P Kohlschreiber	6	6
(United States) J Blake (United States) B Reynolds	6	7
WC	(Switzerland) M Lammer (Switzerland) A Sadecky	4	5
(Argentina) J Acasuso (Argentina) A Calleri	6	7^{7}
4	(Poland) M Fyrstenberg (Poland) M Matkowski	4	6^{5}
(Spain) Ó Hernández (Spain) A Montañés	4	3
(Australia) J Kerr (Finland) J Nieminen	6	6
(Spain) M Granollers (Spain) F López	4	1
2	(India) M Bhupathi (The Bahamas) M Knowles	6	6

Quarterfinals
(Czech Republic) T Berdych (Germany) N Kiefer	3	4
(Argentina) D Nalbandian (Argentina) E Schwank	6	6
3	(Czech Republic) L Dlouhý (India) L Paes	3	0
(Germany) C Kas (Germany) P Kohlschreiber	6	6
(United States) J Blake (United States) B Reynolds	4	7^{8}	[9]
(Argentina) J Acasuso (Argentina) A Calleri	6	6^{6}	[11]
(Australia) J Kerr (Finland) J Nieminen	7	3	[5]
2	(India) M Bhupathi (The Bahamas) M Knowles	5	6	[10]

Semifinals
(Argentina) D Nalbandian (Argentina) E Schwank	6	6^{9}	[2]
(Germany) C Kas (Germany) P Kohlschreiber	3	7^{11}	[10]
(Argentina) J Acasuso (Argentina) A Calleri	5	2
2	(India) M Bhupathi (The Bahamas) M Knowles	7	6

Final
(Germany) C Kas (Germany) P Kohlschreiber	3	3
2	(India) M Bhupathi (The Bahamas) M Knowles	6	6
