= Juan Martín del Potro =

Argentine tennis player (born 1988)

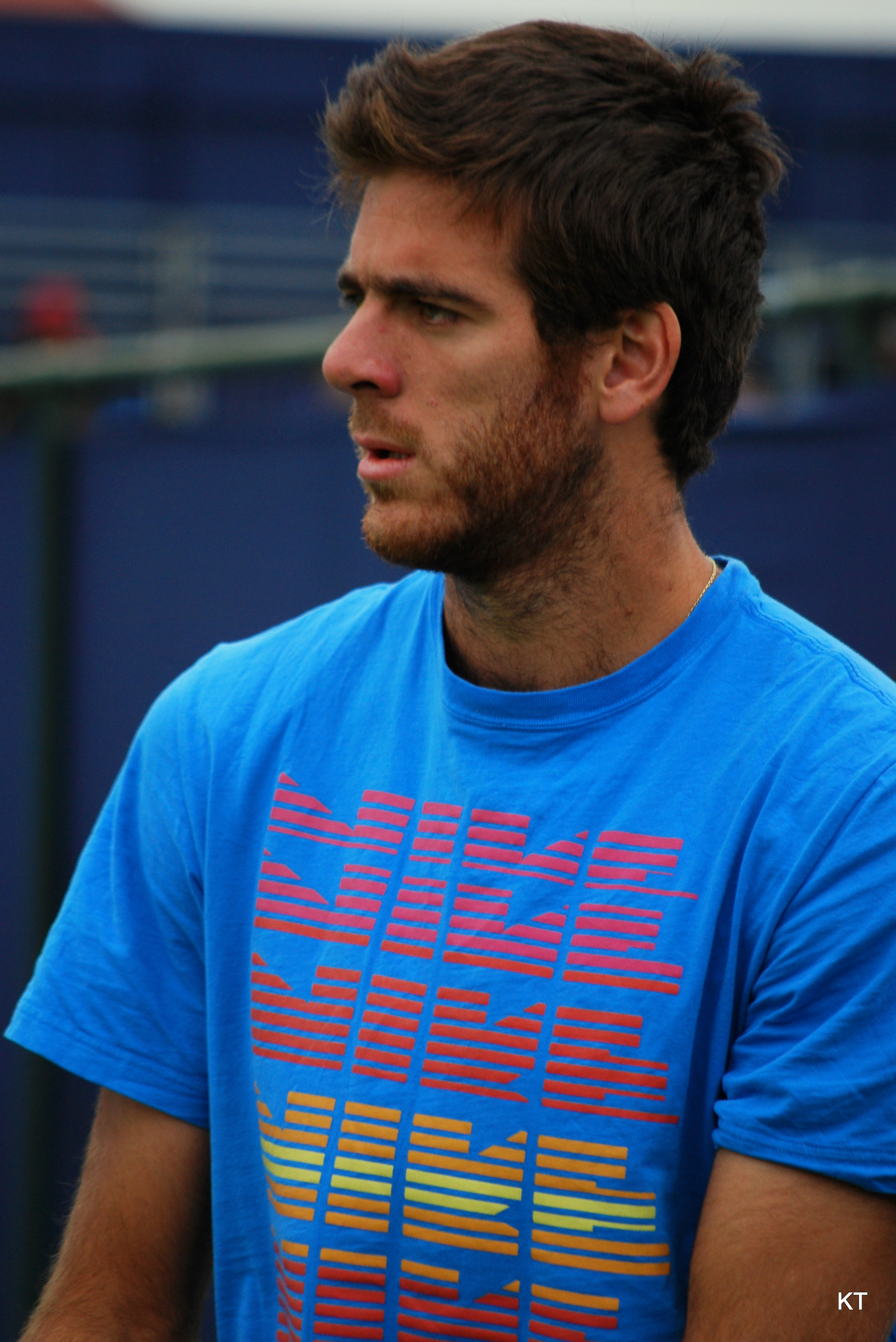
- Del Potro at the 2011 Aegon Championships
- Country (sports): Argentina
- Residence: Tandil, Argentina
- Born: 23 September 1988 (age 38) Tandil, Argentina
- Height: 1.98 m (6 ft 6 in)
- Turned pro: 2005
- Retired: 2024
- Plays: Right-handed (two-handed backhand)
- Prize money: US$25,896,046: 22nd all-time leader in earnings

Singles
- Career record: 439–174 (71.6%)
- Career titles: 22
- Highest ranking: No. 3 (13 August 2018)

Grand Slam singles results
- Australian Open: QF (2009, 2012)
- French Open: SF (2009, 2018)
- Wimbledon: SF (2013)
- US Open: W (2009)

Other tournaments
- Tour Finals: F (2009)
- Olympic Games: F (2016)

Doubles
- Career record: 41–44 (48.2%)
- Career titles: 1
- Highest ranking: No. 105 (25 May 2009)

Grand Slam doubles results
- French Open: 1R (2006, 2007)
- Wimbledon: 1R (2007, 2008)

Other doubles tournaments
- Olympic Games: 2R (2016)

Other mixed doubles tournaments
- Olympic Games: QF (2012)

Team competitions
- Davis Cup: W (2016)
Medal record
Representing Argentina
Olympic Games
Silver medal – second place	2016 Rio de Janeiro	Singles
Bronze medal – third place	2012 London	Singles

Juan Martín del Potro (Spanish pronunciation: [xwam maɾˈtin del ˈpotɾo]; born 23 September 1988) is an Argentine former professional tennis player. He was ranked world No. 3 in men's singles by the Association of Tennis Professionals (ATP), in August 2018. Del Potro won 22 ATP Tour-level singles titles, including a major at the 2009 US Open, where he defeated Rafael Nadal and the five-time defending champion Roger Federer en route. Del Potro's other career highlights include storming to the 2018 US Open final, winning an Olympic silver medal at the 2016 Rio Olympics and a bronze medal at the 2012 London Olympics, winning Indian Wells in 2018, and leading Argentina to the 2016 Davis Cup title.

Del Potro first quietly entered the top 10 of the ATP rankings on 6 October 2008. With his US Open win, he became the only man outside the Big Three (Nadal, Federer, and Novak Djokovic) to win a major between the 2005 French Open and the 2012 Wimbledon Championships, a span of 30 tournaments. In 2016, del Potro led Argentina to its first Davis Cup title by defeating Croatia's Marin Čilić in the final from two sets down. He then reached his first major semifinal in four years by defeating Federer in 4 sets in the quarterfinals of the 2017 US Open. In 2018, he won his first ATP Masters 1000 title at Indian Wells, defeating the defending champion and world No. 1 Federer in the final. After reaching the semifinals of the 2018 French Open, he matched his career-high ranking of No. 4, and in August 2018 he reached the world No. 3 ranking for the first time. At the 2018 US Open, he reached his second major final, where he lost to Djokovic.

Notably, his career was hampered by a succession of wrist and knee injuries. Del Potro did not play between June 2019 and February 2022 because of pain from a knee injury, formally retiring in 2024 after a farewell exhibition match against Djokovic.

== Early life ==
Juan Martín del Potro was born in Tandil, Argentina. His father, Daniel del Potro (1957–2021), played rugby union in Argentina and was a veterinarian. His mother, Patricia Lucas, is a teacher, and he has a younger sister named Julieta. He also had an elder sister, who died in a car accident when she was eight years old. Del Potro speaks Spanish, English and some Italian.

Aside from tennis, he enjoys playing association football and supports the Boca Juniors team in Argentina and Juventus in Italy. He would often dedicate time to both sports during his youth, and Argentine-Italian international footballer Mauro Camoranesi, who grew up in the same town, remains a close friend of del Potro.

Del Potro began playing tennis at the age of seven with coach Marcelo Gómez (who also coached Tandil-born players Juan Mónaco, Mariano Zabaleta and Máximo González). Del Potro's talent was discovered by Italian ex-tennis professional Ugo Colombini, who accompanied him through the initial phases of his young career, and is still today his agent and close friend. When questioned in 2007 about his ambitions in tennis he replied, "I dream of winning a Grand Slam and the Davis Cup." Despite refusing to participate in the Davis Cup several times, he has since achieved both goals.

== Tennis career ==
=== Junior years ===
Del Potro played his first junior match in April 2003 at the age of 14 at a Grade-2 tournament in Italy. As a junior in 2002, del Potro won the Orange Bowl 14s title, beating Marin Čilić en route to a victory over Pavel Tchekov in the final. In 2003, at the age of 14, del Potro received wildcards to three ITF Circuit events in Argentina, where he lost in straight sets in the first round of each.

As a junior, del Potro reached as high as No. 3 in the combined ITF junior world rankings, in January 2005.

=== 2004–2005: Early career ===
In May 2004, del Potro won his first senior match, at the age of 15, at the ITF Circuit event in Buenos Aires by defeating Matias Niemiz. He then went on to lose in three sets to Sebastián Decoud in the second round. Del Potro saw his world ranking rise from No. 1441 in August to No. 1077 in November. He also reached the finals in the Argentina Cup and Campionati Internazionali D'Italia Junior tournaments.

Del Potro reached his first final of the ITF Junior Circuit on 11 January 2005, the "Copa del Cafe (Coffee Bowl)" Junior ITF Tournament in Costa Rica, where he lost to Robin Haase in three sets. Because of the rain delays, the final set had to be played indoors; the first time the indoor courts had been used in the 44-year history of the youth tournament.

At the age of 16, del Potro reached his first senior singles final at the Futures tournament in Berimbau Naucalpan, Mexico, where he lost to Darko Mađarovski. He then went on to win consecutive titles at two Future ITF Circuit events in Santiago, Chile, including the 26th International Junior tournament. In the first tournament, he beat Jorge Aguilar, and in the second, he did not drop a set in the whole tournament and defeated Thiago Alves in the final, a player ranked more than 400 places higher at the time. He won his third title in his home country by defeating Damián Patriarca, who forfeited the match, at the ITF Circuit event in Buenos Aires.

Del Potro turned professional in June 2005 and in his first professional tournament, the Lines Trophy Challenger tournament in Reggio Emilia, he reached the semifinals, where he lost to countryman Martín Vassallo Argüello in three sets. Two tournaments later, he reached the final of the Credicard Citi MasterCard Tennis Cup in Campos do Jordão, Brazil where he lost to André Sá in straight sets. After turning 17, he won the Montevideo Challenger by defeating Boris Pašanski in the final in three sets. That same year, he failed in his first attempt to qualify for his first major, at the US Open, losing in the first round to Paraguayan Ramón Delgado. Throughout 2005, del Potro jumped over 900 positions to finish with a world ranking of No. 157, largely due to winning three Futures tournaments. He was the youngest player to finish in the year-end top 200.

=== 2006: Top 100 ===
In February, del Potro played his first ATP Tour event in Viña del Mar, where he defeated Albert Portas, before losing to Fernando González in the second round. Later, seeded seventh, he won the Copa Club Campestre de Aguascalientes by defeating the likes of Dick Norman and Thiago Alves, before beating Sergio Roitman in the final.

Del Potro qualified for the main draw of his first major in the 2006 French Open at the age of 17. He lost in the opening round to former French Open champion and 24th seed Juan Carlos Ferrero. Having received a wildcard, he reached the quarterfinals of the ATP event in Umag, Croatia, where he lost in three sets to the eventual champion, Stanislas Wawrinka. In Spain, he participated in the Open Castilla y León Challenger tournament held in Segovia, defeating top seed Fernando Verdasco in the quarterfinals and Benjamin Becker in the final.

Del Potro qualified for his first US Open in 2006, where he lost in the first round to fellow qualifier Alejandro Falla of Colombia in four sets. He qualified for his first ATP Masters Series tournament in Spain, the Madrid Open, where he lost in the first round to Joachim Johansson. After receiving a wild card thanks to Roger Federer, he reached the quarterfinals of the 2006 Swiss Indoors in Basel, defeating lucky loser Tobias Clemens in the first round and George Bastl in the second round, before losing to the eventual runner-up Fernando González in three sets. Del Potro finished 2006 as the youngest player in the top 100, aged 18 years, 2 months.

=== 2007: Top 50, first doubles title ===
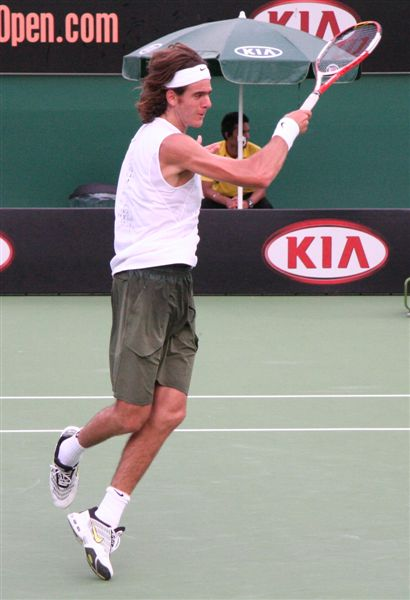
Del Potro at 2007 Australian Open

Del Potro began the year by reaching his first semifinal in ATP Adelaide, Australia, where he lost to Chris Guccione, having beaten Igor Kunitsyn earlier in the day. He then reached the second round of the Australian Open, where he had to retire because of injury in his match against eventual finalist Fernando González in the fifth set. In February, del Potro played for Argentina in the first round of the Davis Cup against Austria, winning the fourth and deciding match against Jürgen Melzer in five sets, allowing Argentina to qualify for the quarterfinals.

Del Potro defeated Feliciano López before losing to eventual semifinalist Mardy Fish in the second round of the indoor Regions Morgan Keegan Championships. In his next ATP Masters event, he reached the second round of the Pacific Life Open, beating Gustavo Kuerten in the first round, but then losing to Richard Gasquet. Del Potro went further in the Miami Open, reaching the fourth round, after he defeated three top-50 players: Jonas Björkman, Marcos Baghdatis, and Mikhail Youzhny, before falling to Rafael Nadal in two sets. In May, he lost in the first round of the French Open to eventual champion Nadal.

In his first grass-court event, del Potro beat Thomas Johansson and lost to Nadal in the second round at the Queen's Club. He also reached the quarterfinals in Nottingham the following week; there he beat British qualifier Jamie Baker and Kunitsyn, but lost to Ivo Karlović in the quarterfinals. At his inaugural Wimbledon Championships, he defeated Davide Sanguinetti, before losing to eventual champion Roger Federer in the second round.

Del Potro lost to Frank Dancevic in three sets in the second round of the singles at the ATP event in Indianapolis. At the same event, partnered with Travis Parrott in doubles, he won his first doubles tournament, defeating Teymuraz Gabashvili and Karlović in the final. He regards this as a special victory, "It was fantastic to play doubles with Parrott. I'm so happy because I've never won a doubles tournament. For the rest of my life, I will remember this tournament." Del Potro qualified for the ATP Masters Series event in Cincinnati, where he reached the third round. He defeated countryman Guillermo Cañas in the first round and Philipp Kohlschreiber in the second, before losing to former world No. 1, Carlos Moyá. At that year's US Open, he defeated Nicolas Mahut and Melzer, before losing to eventual finalist and third seed Novak Djokovic in the third round. He also reached the third round of the Madrid Masters by beating Potito Starace and Tommy Robredo, before losing to eventual champion David Nalbandian, in straight sets. In the last tournament of the year, the Paris Masters, he reached the second round, where he lost to Nikolay Davydenko. That year, del Potro was the youngest player to finish in the year-end top 50 at 19 years, 2 months.

=== 2008: First titles, Davis Cup final, top 10 ===
Del Potro's first half of the season was hampered by injuries and a change of coach, starting with a first-round loss in Adelaide, where he was the seventh seed. At the Australian Open in January, he retired against David Ferrer in round two due to an injury. Del Potro returned to the circuit in March, winning his first match against Jesse Levine at the Miami Open, before losing in the second round to López. Struggling with injuries, his ranking fell as low as no. 81 in April. "At the start of the year, I was playing good, but I had many injuries, many problems with my body, with my physique", said del Potro. "I changed my coach, changed my physical trainer, I changed everything."

In May, del Potro had to retire again, this time in a first-round match against Andy Murray at the Rome Masters. During the second set, the Argentine allegedly made derogatory comments about Murray's mother which resulted in a complaint to the umpire. Del Potro's serve was subsequently broken three times in a row, and he suffered a back injury, which caused his retirement. In his second major of the year, the French Open, he was eliminated in the second round by Simone Bolelli in four sets. In June, he reached the semifinals of the Rosmalen Open, losing to eventual winner and top seed David Ferrer in straight sets. For the second year in a row, he was knocked out of Wimbledon in the second round; he beat Pavel Šnobel, but lost to Stanislas Wawrinka.

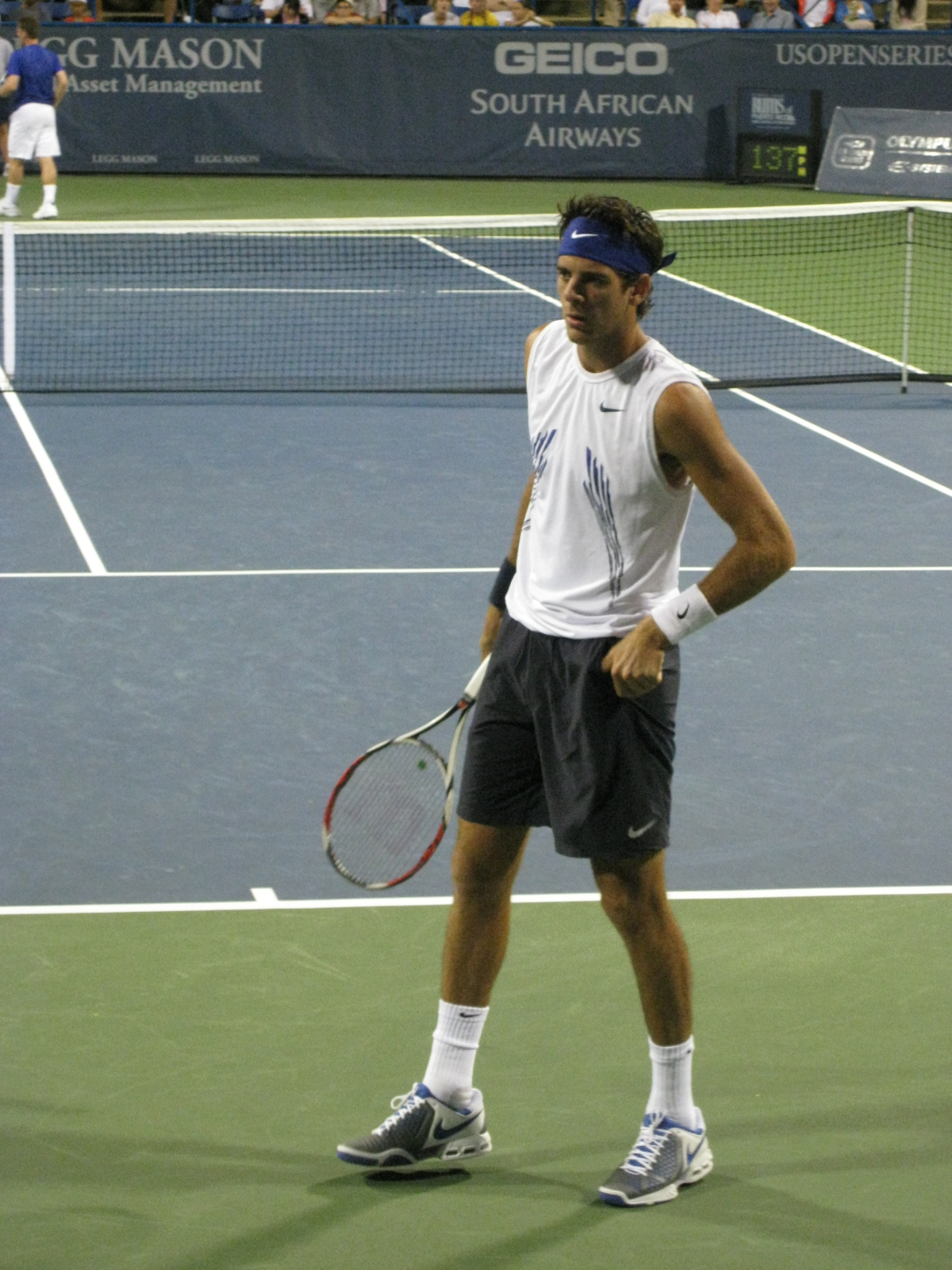
Del Potro won four consecutive titles in 2008, with the final one coming in Washington.

A successful summer followed for the Argentine. In July, del Potro and his team decided to remain in Europe to test his fitness. "We decided to play on clay courts for my back because if I start to play again on hard courts, maybe I will injure it again", he recalled. Del Potro won his first career ATP Tour title at the Mercedes Cup in Stuttgart, defeating Gasquet in straight sets in the final. A week later, del Potro reached his second career ATP Tour final at the Austrian Open in Kitzbühel, where he beat local hope and sixth seed Melzer in less than an hour, to claim his second title in two weeks. Having competed in just two clay tournaments all of the 2007 season, he never thought he would win his first two titles on clay courts.

In August, del Potro won his third consecutive title at the Los Angeles Open, beating Andy Roddick in straight sets in the final. After the match, Roddick praised his opponent. "[Del Potro] hits this way and this way kind of equally and he can hit it from inside out and running to it, which is a good thing for him, bad for the rest of us". A fourth consecutive title followed a week later in the Legg Mason Tennis Classic in Washington, D.C., where he beat Viktor Troicki, becoming the first player in ATP history to win his first four career titles in consecutive tournaments. "I don't really understand what I did. It is difficult to believe that I have won four consecutive titles", del Potro said, crediting coach Franco Davín for his impressive run. "He changed my game. He changed my mind. He changed everything. When I play and I see him in the stands, it gives me confidence. I can play relaxed." At the 2008 US Open, del Potro won his first match to five sets in the circuit against Gilles Simon to reach the round of 16. He went on to defeat Japanese teenager Kei Nishikori in straight sets. In the quarterfinals, he was stopped by eventual finalist Murray, losing after almost four hours. The defeat came after 23 consecutive victories: the second-longest winning streak in 2008 and the longest winning streak by a player outside the top 10 in the last 20 years.

Del Potro was selected to play his first home-based Davis Cup tie, between Argentina and Russia. He beat Davydenko in three sets and also won the fifth and deciding match against Igor Andreev in straight sets, booking Argentina a place in the final.

At the Japan Open, he made the final by defeating 11th seed Jarkko Nieminen, top seed and defending champion Ferrer, and fourth seed Richard Gasquet. He was defeated by Tomáš Berdych in the final. At the Madrid Masters, he lost in the quarterfinals in straight sets to Roger Federer. He reached the semifinals of his next tournament, the Swiss Indoors, before losing to countryman Nalbandian. He was beaten by Nalbandian again in his next tournament, in the second round of the Paris Masters. Del Potro blamed fatigue for his defeat, "It's difficult to play the last tournament of the year. I was tired, my mind was in Argentina [the venue for the Davis Cup final]". This left del Potro's qualification for the 2008 Tennis Masters Cup out of his hands, but Jo-Wilfried Tsonga beat James Blake in the semifinals, which was enough to ensure his place at the year-end event.

Del Potro won one match at the Masters Cup, against Tsonga, but lost his other two matches against the higher-ranked Djokovic and Davydenko, meaning that he exited the tournament in the round-robin stage. He went on to lose one match in the Davis Cup final, against López, as his team succumbed to a 3–1 loss against Spain. He withdrew from his second match due to a thigh injury and was replaced by José Acasuso. Nonetheless, del Potro enjoyed a successful season; winning four titles and finishing 2008 as the youngest player in the top 10, top-ranked Argentine, and highest-ranked South American.

=== 2009: US Open champion, ATP Tour Finals final, top 5 ===
Del Potro began his 2009 season at the Auckland Open in New Zealand as the top seed. He defeated American Sam Querrey in the final to win the title, the fifth of his career. Seeded eighth at the Australian Open, he beat Marin Čilić in the fourth round before losing in straight sets to Federer. At Indian Wells, del Potro lost in the quarters to world No. 1 Nadal. Del Potro avenged that loss the following week at the Miami Open, where he came back from a double break down in the third set at 0–3 to defeat Nadal in the quarterfinals. This was the first time del Potro had defeated Nadal in five meetings. Despite a loss in the semifinals to Murray, del Potro reached a career-high world ranking of No. 5.

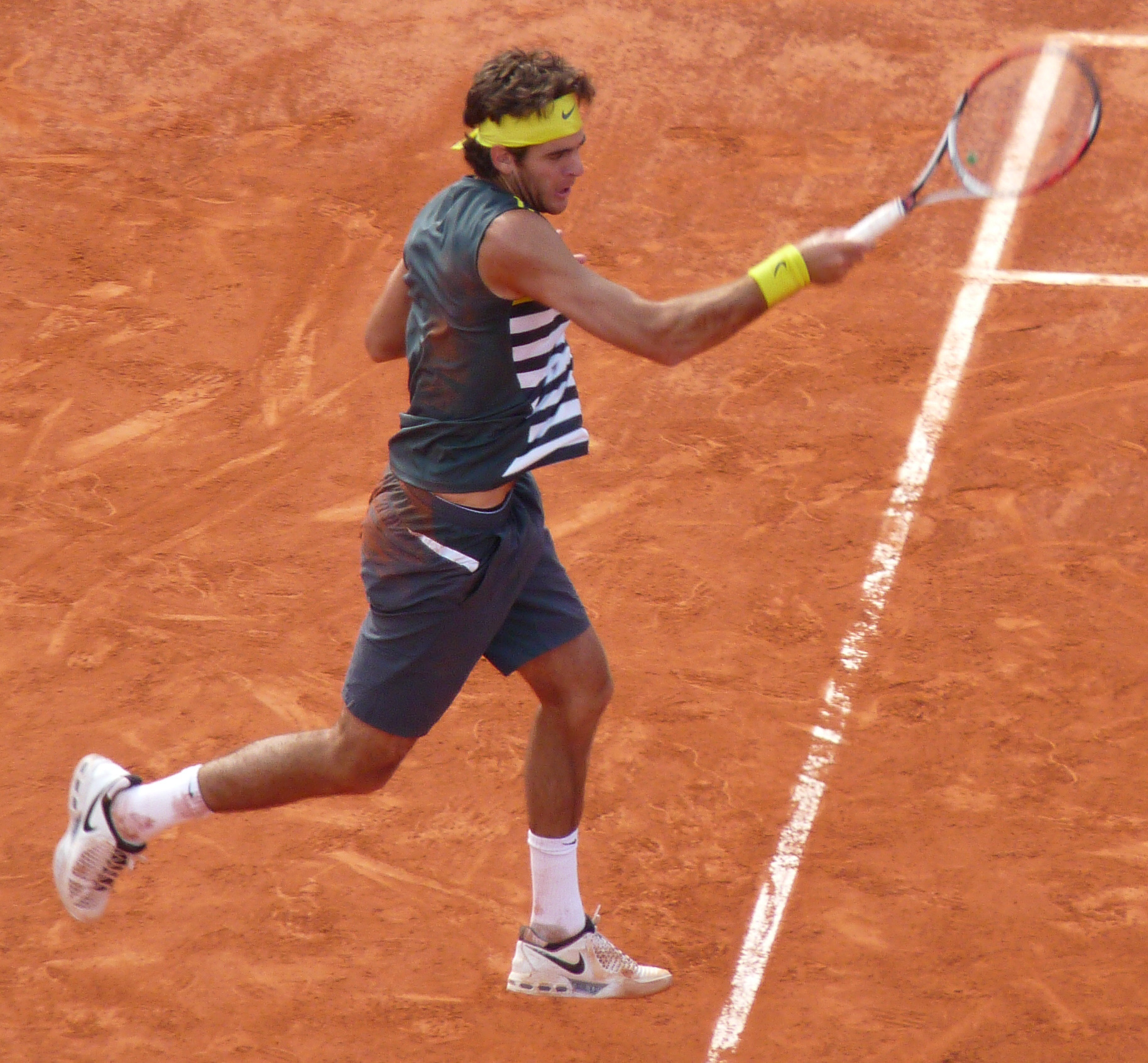
At the 2009 French Open, del Potro made the semifinals, losing to eventual champion Federer

In the clay-court season, del Potro was eliminated in the second round of the Monte Carlo Masters by Ivan Ljubičić. In Rome, del Potro beat Victor Troicki and Wawrinka to advance to the quarterfinals, where he was defeated by defending champion Djokovic in straight sets. This meant del Potro's head-to-head record with the Serb was now 0–3. At the Madrid Masters, Del Potro beat Murray for the first time in the quarterfinals, but lost to Federer in the semifinals. At the French Open, where he was fifth seed, del Potro defeated Michaël Llodra, Troicki, Andreev, and ninth seed Tsonga en route to the quarterfinals. He then defeated three-time former quarterfinalist Tommy Robredo to get to his first semifinal of a Grand Slam. He was defeated in a close semifinal, where he was leading by a set twice, by eventual champion Federer who, after their match, said: "[Del Potro] is young and strong, I have a lot of respect for him." Prior to this encounter, del Potro had never taken a set from Federer in their five previous career meetings.

At the 2009 Wimbledon Championships, he lost to unseeded Lleyton Hewitt in the second round. In the Davis Cup quarterfinal against the Czech Republic, del Potro won his matches against Ivo Minář and Berdych in straight sets, but Argentina still lost the tie 2–3. A few weeks later, he defeated Hewitt and Fernando González en route to the Washington final. He successfully defended his title against top-seeded Wimbledon finalist Andy Roddick to win his second tournament of the year and become the first player since Andre Agassi to win back-to-back Washington titles. At the Masters 1000 in Montreal, he beat world No. 2 Nadal in the quarterfinals, his second consecutive win over Nadal. He then defeated Roddick in the semifinals, saving a match point, to advance to his first Masters 1000 final, and to improve his head-to-head record against Roddick to 3–0. In the final, he lost against Murray in three sets. He later withdrew from the next Masters 1000 event in Cincinnati due to fatigue.

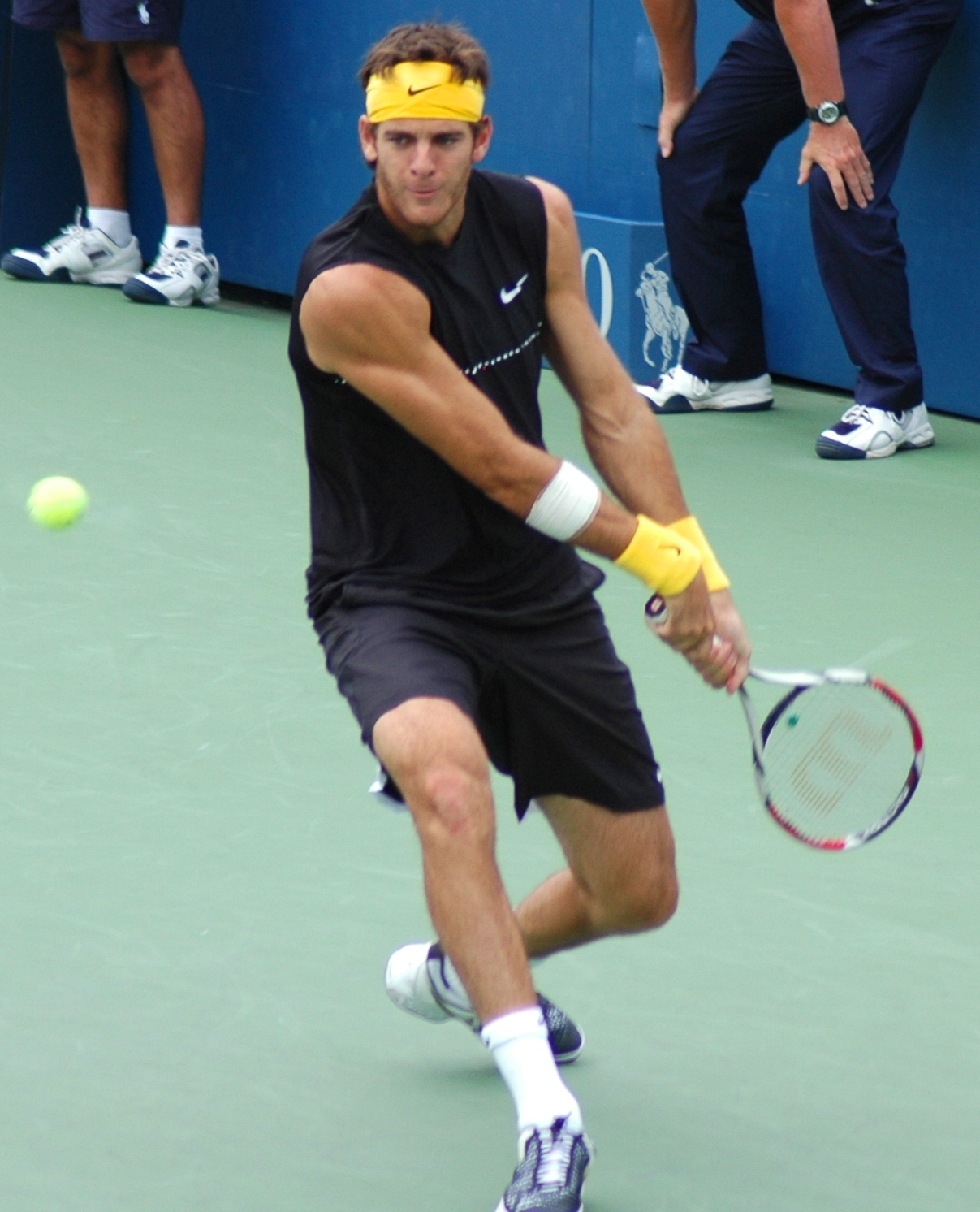
Del Potro at the 2009 US Open

Seeded sixth at the US Open, del Potro began by defeating Juan Mónaco and Jürgen Melzer in straight sets, before dropping a set but defeating Köllerer to reach the fourth round. He defeated a resurgent Juan Carlos Ferrero to advance to the quarterfinals for the second consecutive year. Del Potro then advanced to the semifinals by defeating Marin Čilić. Del Potro was down a set and a break, before winning 17 of the final 20 games to win the match. His advance to the semifinals ensured his return to the top 5 in the rankings. He then crushed world No. 3 and reigning Australian Open champion Rafael Nadal in the semifinals, to reach his first Grand Slam final. This was his third consecutive victory over Nadal and made him the first Argentine to reach a Grand Slam singles final since Mariano Puerta at the 2005 French Open. In the final, del Potro rallied from a set and a break down to defeat world No. 1 and five-time defending champion Roger Federer in five sets; his first victory over Federer after six previous defeats, and Federer's first loss in the US Open since 2003. Del Potro stated, "Since [I was] young, I dream with this and take trophy with me", said del Potro, who became the first Argentine male to win the title since Guillermo Vilas in 1977. "I did my dream, and it's unbelievable moment. It's amazing match, amazing people. Everything is perfect." After the match, Federer praised del Potro; "I thought he hung in there and gave himself chances and, in the end, was the better man."

He became the first player since countryman David Nalbandian to defeat Federer at the US Open, and at 198 cm (6 ft 6 in), he is the tallest ever Grand Slam champion, a record he now shares with Marin Čilić, the 2014 US Open winner, and 2021 champion Daniil Medvedev. Besides Nadal and Djokovic, del Potro is the only player to defeat Federer in a Grand Slam final, and the first player to defeat both Nadal and Federer in the same Grand Slam tournament.

Dick Enberg hosted the post-match ceremony, during which a victorious del Potro requested to address his fans in Spanish. Enberg declined the request, saying that he was running out of time, but went on to list the corporate sponsored prizes del Potro won. A couple of minutes later, del Potro made the same request again, and only then did Enberg relent saying, "Very quickly, in Spanish, he wants to say hello to his friends here and in Argentina." An emotional del Potro finally spoke a few sentences in Spanish to a cheering crowd. Many viewers expressed disappointment with Enberg and broadcaster CBS over the interview. A CBS executive later defended Enberg, noting that the contract with the United States Tennis Association required that certain sponsors receive time during the ceremony. On return to his hometown Tandil, del Potro was greeted by an estimated 40,000 people.

In his first match since the US Open, del Potro was upset by world No. 189, Édouard Roger-Vasselin, in straight sets at the Japan Open in Tokyo. He then lost his second straight match to Melzer in the second round at the Masters 1000 event in Shanghai, retiring while trailing in the second set. This retirement caused concerns over the length of the tennis season. He had to retire again in the Paris Masters quarterfinals when down 0–4 to Radek Štěpánek due to an abdominal injury. At the ATP World Tour Finals in November, he lost his first round-robin match against Andy Murray, but he beat Fernando Verdasco in his second match to keep his hopes alive. After defeating Roger Federer in the following match, he qualified for the semifinals, ousting Murray by one game, the slimmest possible margin. He defeated Robin Söderling in the semifinals, before losing to Nikolay Davydenko in the final. Del Potro finished 2009 as the youngest player in the top 10, top-ranked Argentine, and highest-ranked South American for the second consecutive year.

=== 2010: First wrist injury, out of top 250 ===
Del Potro started his 2010 season at the AAMI Kooyong Classic in Melbourne, Australia, with a win over Croatian world No. 24 Ivan Ljubičić. On 11 January, he moved up to a career high world No. 4. He was scheduled to face Jo-Wilfried Tsonga on day 2 of the Kooyong Classic exhibition tournament, but withdrew due to a wrist injury. He came into the 2010 Australian Open with the injury not healed, and took a month off after the event, where he lost in the fourth round to Marin Čilić.

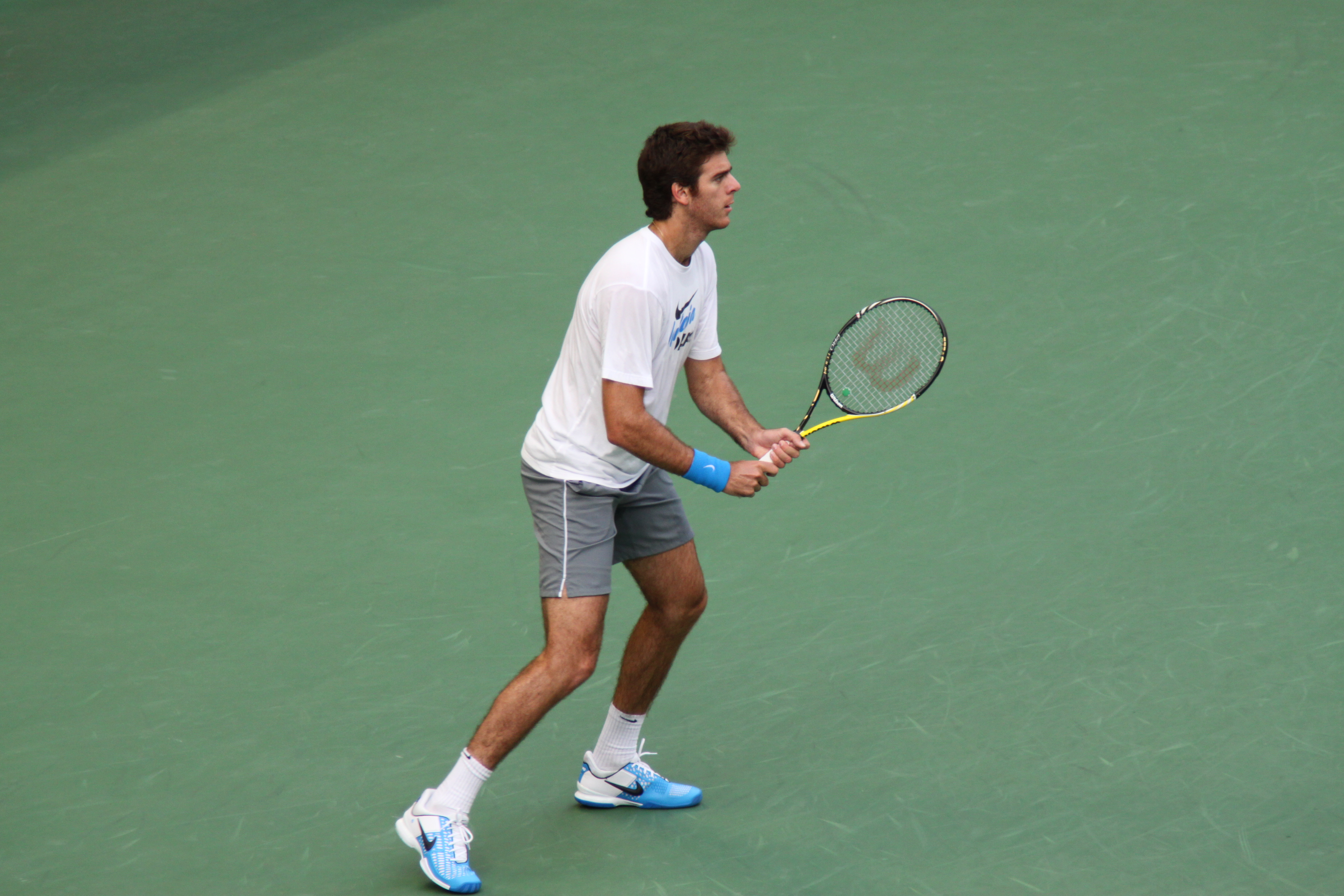
Del Potro at the 2010 Japan Open

Following the Australian Open loss, del Potro missed several tournaments, including the Masters tournaments at Indian Wells and Miami, which were touted as potential return dates, due to the persistent wrist injury. Even though he withdrew from the Monte-Carlo Masters, he regained the world No. 4 ranking, due to Murray's early exit in the second round. He then withdrew from Barcelona and the Rome Masters. On 4 May, del Potro took the option of having an operation to fix the injury. On 19 May, del Potro said he would not defend his US Open title, but if all went well, he would appear after the event, targeting the Paris Masters as a possible comeback. However, on 22 July, the USTA stated that del Potro was expected to defend his US Open crown. The player himself confirmed that his comeback to the tour would be the Thailand Open and said nothing about the New York event. On 2 August, del Potro returned to the practice courts. A week before the start of the US Open, after practicing for two weeks, del Potro withdrew from the event, for he felt he was not ready to compete at the highest level.

After the nine-month break, del Potro confirmed that he would make his return at the Thailand Open. In his return match, he lost in the first round in two sets to Olivier Rochus, despite serving 16 aces. He then also played at the Japan Open, but again lost in the opening round, this time to Feliciano López.

=== 2011: Return to tour, second Davis Cup final ===
Del Potro began his 2011 season at the Sydney International as a wildcard entry. In the second round, del Potro was defeated by Florian Mayer of Germany in straight sets, despite winning against sixth seed Feliciano López in three sets in the first round. His next tournament would be the first Grand Slam of the year at the 2011 Australian Open, where del Potro was defeated by 21st seed Marcos Baghdatis in the second round. As a result, del Potro slipped further down the rankings to No. 485.

After the Australian Open, he participated in the San Jose Open where he was accepted into the main draw via a protected ranking (PR). He reached the semifinals without dropping a set, however he lost to top seed Fernando Verdasco, in straight sets. Del Potro's next scheduled tournament was the U.S. National Indoor Championships, where he was accepted into the main draw via a wildcard, losing to top seed and eventual champion Andy Roddick. Del Potro entered the Delray Beach International Tennis Championships on a wildcard. He defeated Ričardas Berankis, Teymuraz Gabashvili, Kevin Anderson and second-seeded Mardy Fish, to advance to his first ATP final since the 2009 World Tour Finals. In the final, he defeated an erratic Janko Tipsarević in two sets.

Del Potro's next tournament was the ATP Masters at the Indian Wells Masters. He reached the semifinals, where he lost to top-seeded Rafael Nadal in straight sets. At the Miami Masters he defeated world No. 4, Robin Söderling, in straight sets in round three, before losing to eventual semifinalist Mardy Fish in straight sets in round four.

In Estoril Open del Potro defeated top-seeded Robin Söderling, two time French Open finalist, and dropped just one set in his five matches and took the title against Fernando Verdasco in the final. After suffering an 8-millimeter tear in his left rectus abdominis, del Potro withdrew from Madrid Open and did not participate in the Internazionali BNL d'Italia, but confirmed that he would play the French Open. There he lost in the third round in four sets to second-seeded Novak Djokovic.

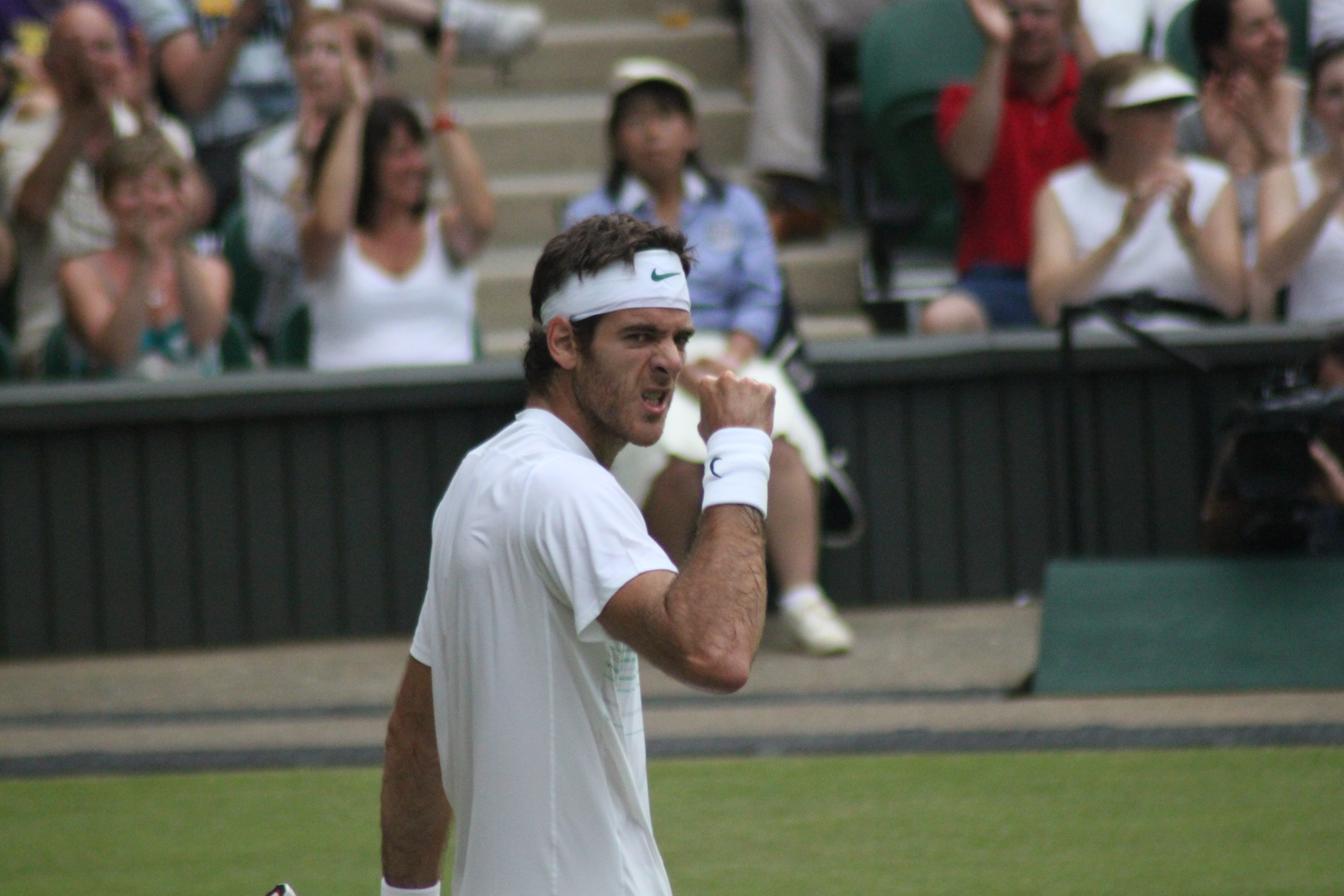
Del Potro at Wimbledon in 2011

Del Potro reached the fourth round at Wimbledon for the first time by defeating Flavio Cipolla, Olivier Rochus, and Gilles Simon but lost in four sets to world No. 1, Rafael Nadal, a match described by The Guardian as the "battle of walking wounded". Del Potro returned to the top 20 at world No. 19 for the first time in nearly a year. His next tournament was the Los Angeles Open in late July, where he received a first-round bye as the second seed. He defeated James Blake but lost to Ernests Gulbis in the quarterfinals.

At the Canada Masters, del Potro defeated Jarkko Nieminen before losing to Marin Čilić in the second round. At the Cincinnati Masters tournament, del Potro lost to Roger Federer, snapping the two-match winning streak he had against his rival. Del Potro entered the 2011 US Open seeded 18th. He beat Filippo Volandri and Diego Junqueira before losing to Gilles Simon in the third round.

After the US Open, del Potro played in the Davis Cup semifinal against Serbia, winning both of his rubbers against Janko Tipsarević and world No. 1, Novak Djokovic. This helped Argentina to a 3–2 victory over Serbia, booking their place in the final. In October he lost in the second round of Stockholm Open to James Blake. He then reached the final in Vienna, losing for the first time to Tsonga. Del Potro then reached the semifinals of the Valencia Open 500, losing to eventual champion Marcel Granollers. He then withdrew from the Paris Masters due to a shoulder injury, wiping out his chances of qualifying for the year-end championships.

Del Potro played in the Davis Cup final in Seville, losing the second rubber to David Ferrer, despite being two sets to one up, in a match lasting over five hours. With his country down 2–1, del Potro needed to beat Rafael Nadal in the reverse singles to keep the tie going. Del Potro dominated the first set, but could not keep his level up and lost in four sets. For the third time in six years, Argentina lost in the finals of the Davis Cup World Group, this time 3–1.

Del Potro finished the year ranked world No. 11, despite being ranked no. 485 at one stage. He was named 2011 ATP Comeback Player of the Year.

=== 2012: Olympic bronze, back to top 10 ===
Del Potro's first tournament of the year was the Sydney International, where he was the top seed. He made it to the quarterfinals after receiving a bye into the second round. He defeated Łukasz Kubot in the second round. In the quarterfinals, he was beaten by Marcos Baghdatis.

In the first round of the Australian Open, del Potro defeated Adrian Mannarino in four sets. He reached the quarterfinals of the Grand Slam for the second time, losing to third-seeded Roger Federer in straight sets.

At ABN AMRO World Tennis Tournament in Rotterdam, he defeated Tomáš Berdych, reaching his first final of an ATP 500 level tournament or higher after returning from his wrist injury in 2010. He lost to Federer in straight sets in the final. At the Open 13 in Marseille, del Potro defeated Davydenko, Gasquet, Tsonga, and Michaël Llodra in the final to win his tenth ATP title. At Dubai, he lost in the semis to Federer again in two tiebreaks. Del Potro lost in the quarterfinals of the Indian Wells Open to Federer for the fourth time that year. He made it to the fourth round of the Miami Open, but lost to David Ferrer in two sets.

Del Potro started his clay-court campaign of 2012 in the Davis Cup quarterfinals against Croatia. He won his first rubber against Ivo Karlović and then defeated Marin Čilić in the reverse singles. At the Estoril Open, he was the defending champion and the top seed. He did not drop a set en route to the final, where he beat Frenchman Richard Gasquet in straight sets to collect his 11th ATP title. At Madrid Masters he defeated Florian Mayer, Mikhail Youzhny, Marin Čilić and Alexandr Dolgopolov, but lost in two tiebreaks to Tomáš Berdych in the semifinals.

At the French Open, where he was seeded ninth, Del Potro defeated Albert Montañés, Édouard Roger-Vasselin, Marin Čilić and seventh seed Tomáš Berdych before losing to Roger Federer in the quarterfinals in five sets, after being up two sets to love.

At Wimbledon, del Potro beat Robin Haase, Go Soeda, and Kei Nishikori, before losing to David Ferrer in the fourth round.

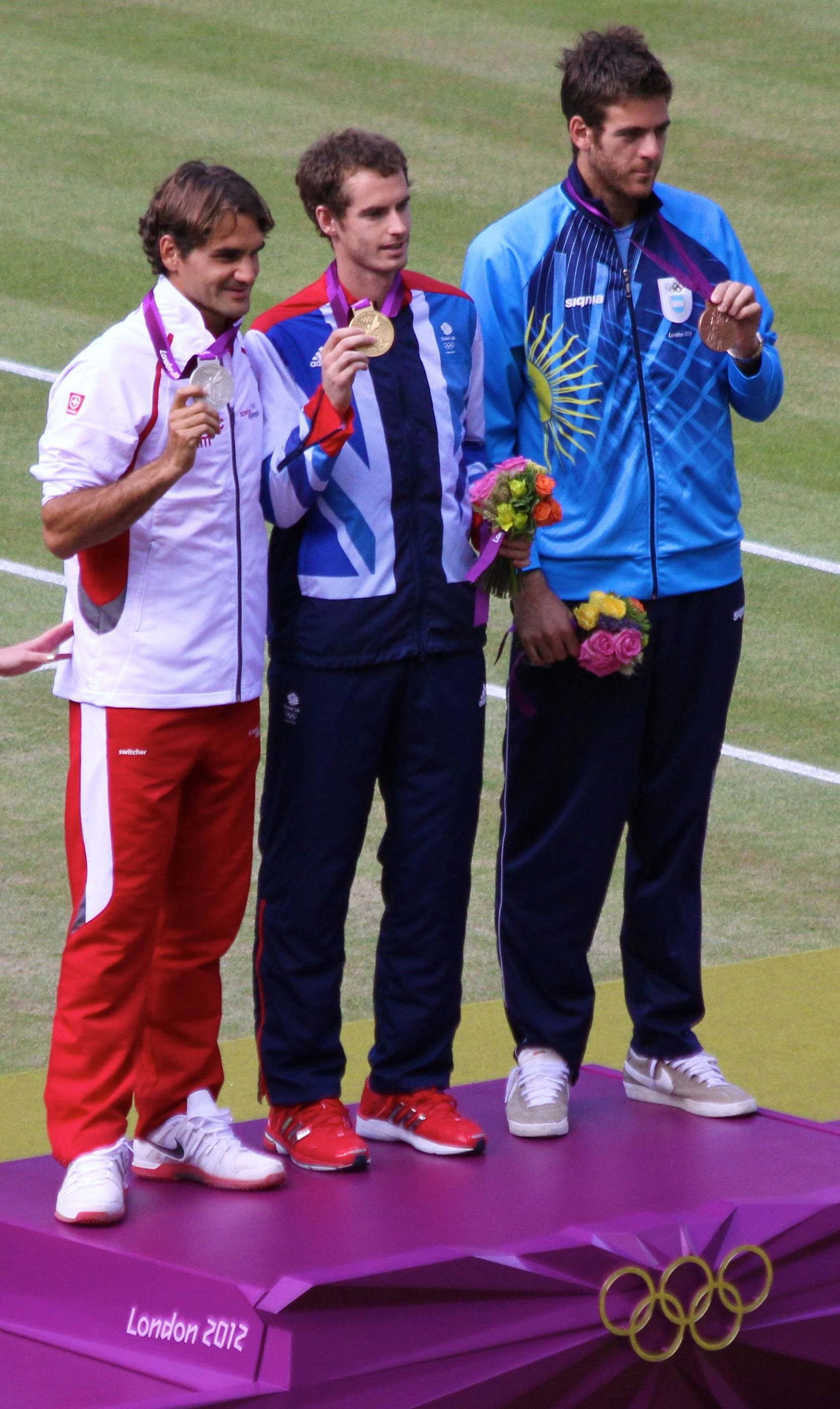
At the Olympic Games medals award ceremony (from right to left: Del Potro, Andy Murray and Roger Federer)

At the Olympic Games, also held at the All England Club in Wimbledon, del Potro faced Federer in the semifinals, which resulted in the longest "best of three sets" tennis match by duration in history, lasting four hours and 26 minutes; the final set took two hours and 43 minutes. Del Potro lost the match, by 17–19 in the third set. Less than two hours after this marathon, del Potro took to the tennis court again with Gisela Dulko for their quarterfinal mixed doubles match against Lisa Raymond and Mike Bryan, which they lost. Two days later, del Potro defeated Djokovic in the bronze-medal match. It was del Potro's first victory over Djokovic, excluding a win that occurred in the Davis Cup where Djokovic retired after dropping the first set.

Del Potro returned to hard courts to play at the Rogers Cup, where he was upset by 33-year-old world No. 40 Radek Štěpánek. Del Potro ended the illustrious career of American tennis star Andy Roddick, retiring him by winning their fourth round match before going on to lose in the quarterfinals of the US Open against Djokovic.

In October, del Potro beat qualifier Grega Žemlja to win the Erste Bank Open in Vienna. He then beat Roger Federer in a third set tie-break to win the Swiss Indoors title, in Basel. The following week, he suffered a third-round loss to Michaël Llodra at the BNP Paribas Masters. During the round-robin stage of the ATP World Tour Finals, he won two of his three matches and qualified for the semifinals, where he was defeated by Djokovic in three sets, after leading by a set and a break.

He ended the year ranked world No. 7, with a 65–17 win–loss record and four titles captured throughout the season.

=== 2013: Wimbledon semifinal, return to top 5 ===
Del Potro began his season at the Australian Open, where he was upset in the third round by Jérémy Chardy in five sets. The next month, he won the Rotterdam Open, beating Gaël Monfils, Ernest Gulbis, Jarkko Nieminen, Grigor Dimitrov in the semifinals, and Julien Benneteau in the final. At Dubai, del Potro beat Marcos Baghdatis, saving three match points, Somdev Devvarman, and Daniel Brands, but lost in the semifinals to eventual winner Novak Djokovic. At Indian Wells in March, del Potro defeated Nikolay Davydenko, Björn Phau, and Tommy Haas. In the quarterfinals, he beat Andy Murray for the second time in six matches. In the semifinals, he upset top seed and world No. 1 Djokovic, to end the Serb's streak of 22 victories. He then lost in the final to Rafael Nadal in three sets. Del Potro withdrew from most of the clay-court season and from the French Open due to a viral infection.

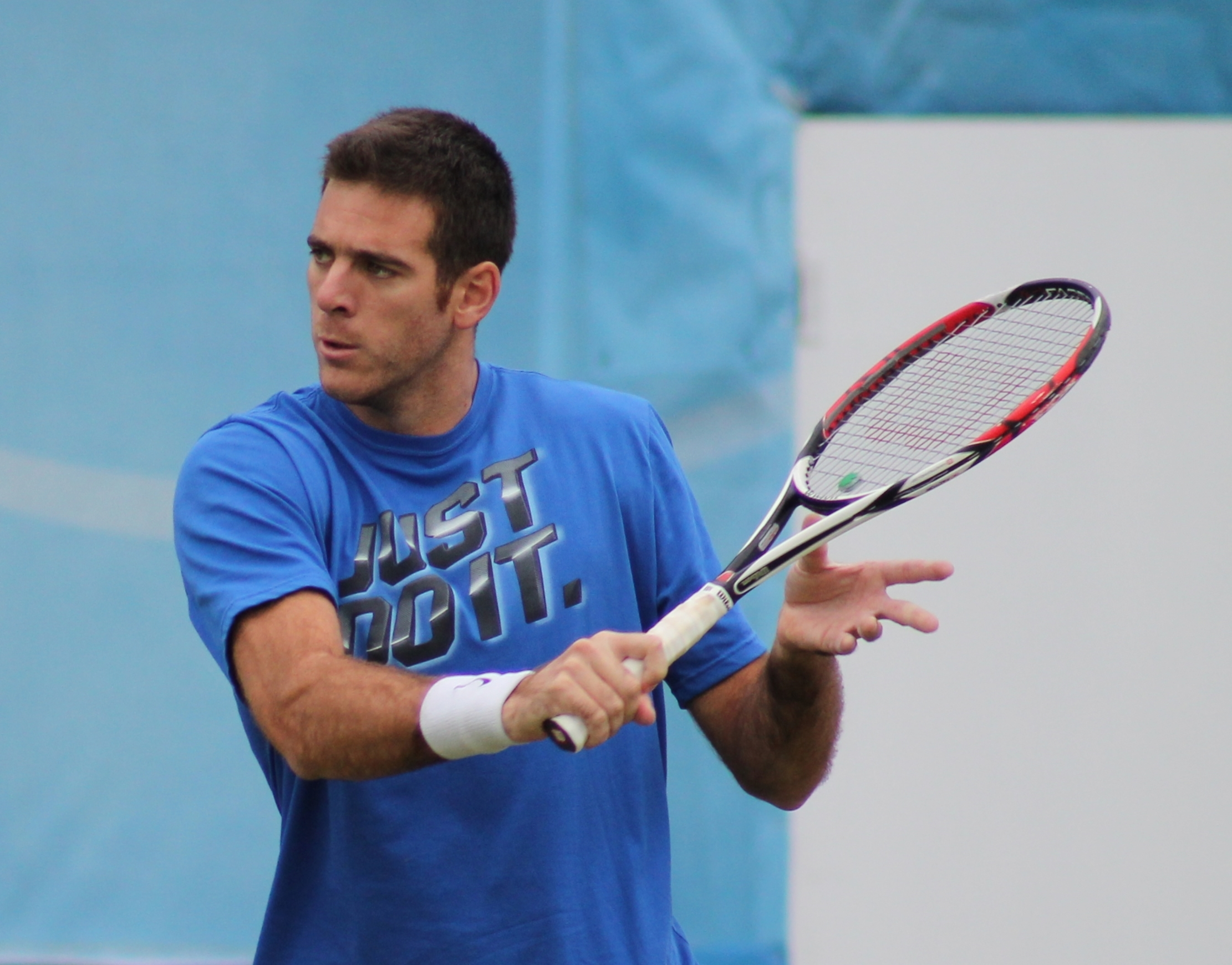
Del Potro at the Queen's Club, 2013

On grass, del Potro began at the Queen's Club Championships, where he won his first comeback match in three sets against Xavier Malisse. He defeated Daniel Evans, only to be upset in the quarterfinals by Lleyton Hewitt.

At Wimbledon, Del Potro won against Albert Ramos, Jesse Levine, and Grega Žemlja before advancing past the fourth round for the first time in his career, thanks to a win over Andreas Seppi. He then played David Ferrer and, despite slipping badly during the fifth point of the match and aggravating a pre-existing leg injury, requiring over five minutes of treatment and by his own admission being close to forfeiting the match, he recovered to defeat Ferrer in straight sets to advance to his first Grand Slam semifinal since the 2009 US Open without dropping a set. On 5 July, Djokovic defeated him in five sets in 4 hours and 44 minutes, making it at that point the longest semifinal in the history of Wimbledon men's singles.

Del Potro won the Washington Open, beating Ryan Harrison, Bernard Tomic, Kevin Anderson, Tommy Haas in the semifinals and John Isner in the final in three sets. Before the final he didn't drop a set. This was his third title at the event and his second of the year. Del Potro reached the semifinals of Cincinnati Masters where he again faced Isner and lost the match in three sets. Del Potro got to the second round of the US Open, after a four-set victory against Guillermo García-López, only to be upset by Lleyton Hewitt in five sets.

At the Japan Open, Del Potro, who entered the tournament on a wildcard, beat Marcos Baghdatis, Carlos Berlocq, Alexandr Dolgopolov, Nicolas Almagro and Milos Raonic in two sets to win his third title of the year. In October, Del Potro reached the final of the Shanghai Rolex Masters, defeating Philipp Kohlschreiber, Tommy Haas, Nicolás Almagro, and Rafael Nadal (for the first time since the semifinals of the 2009 US Open) en route, but eventually losing to defending champion Djokovic in a third-set tiebreak. In late October he beat sixth-seeded Roger Federer in three sets in the final of the Swiss Indoors, his fourth title of the year. However, he lost to Federer in the quarterfinals of the Paris Masters and in a winner-take-all, round-robin clash in the ATP World Tour Finals at the O_{2} arena in London. He finished the year with a 51–16 record, winning four titles overall and prize money of $4,294,039. Del Potro was named Argentina's Sportsman of the Year.

=== 2014–2015: Second wrist injury, two years away from tour ===
Del Potro began his 2014 ATP World Tour season at the Sydney International as the top seed, winning the final of the tournament against defending champion Bernard Tomic in only 53 minutes. It was his fifth title as top seed.

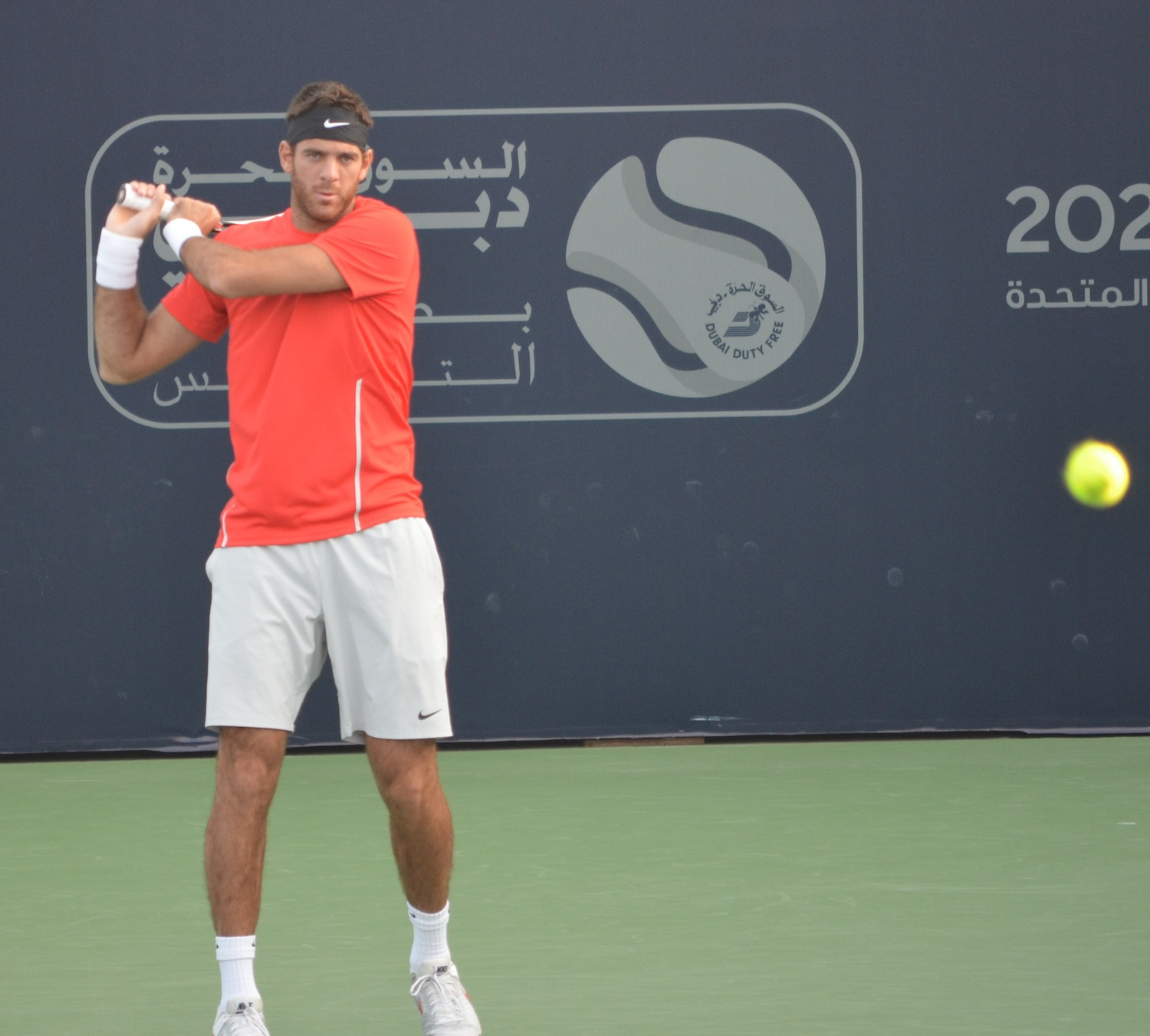
Del Potro at the 2014 Dubai Tennis Championships

When asked to play for Argentina in the Davis Cup, del Potro declined, arguing problems with the press and the team, and his decision to prioritize his personal career.

At the Australian Open, he won his opening match against Rhyne Williams, but lost to Roberto Bautista-Agut in the second round, having led two sets to one. Despite his second-round loss, del Potro returned to being world No. 4. After the Australian Open, del Potro required treatment for his left wrist, which had been giving him trouble since 2012.

In February, at the 2014 Rotterdam Open, he eased past Gaël Monfils and Paul-Henri Mathieu in straight sets, but fell to Latvian Ernests Gulbis in the quarterfinals. In the 2014 Dubai Tennis Championships, he retired against Somdev Devvarman after losing the first set due to his wrist injury and said "It was really tough to play today. I tried everything. I cannot be the player I would like to be." The same injury led to his subsequent withdrawal from Masters 1000 series events in Indian Wells and Miami, meaning that del Potro dropped to world No. 8.

Del Potro underwent surgery in March 2014 to repair the problem in his left wrist, missing the rest of the 2014 season.

Del Potro began his 2015 season with wrist pain and was not sure whether he would play Sydney and the 2015 Australian Open. However, at the last minute he decided to play both tournaments. He had not played a tournament since February 2014, but he started the Sydney International with a straight-sets win against Sergiy Stakhovsky. In the second round he defeated world No. 19 and top seed Fabio Fognini to reach the quarterfinals, which he lost to Mikhail Kukushkin in two tiebreakers. Del Potro withdrew from the 2015 Australian Open, due to his wrist injury, the day before his first match and had another surgery on his left wrist. In late March Del Potro played in the Miami Open with a protected ranking and lost his first-round match to Vasek Pospisil. It would be his last match of the year, undergoing wrist surgery again in June 2015.

=== 2016: Comeback, Olympic silver, Davis Cup champion ===
He played his first tournament since undergoing surgery at the Delray Beach Open in mid February. In his first competitive match in almost a year, del Potro defeated Denis Kudla in two sets. He followed this up with a straight sets win over Australian John-Patrick Smith. He defeated Jérémy Chardy in two sets in the quarterfinal, reaching his first semifinal since 2014; which he lost to eventual champion Sam Querrey. At Indian Wells, he beat Tim Smyczek in two sets. He lost in the next round to Tomas Berdych in straight sets. At Miami Open he beat Guido Pella in two sets and was set to play Roger Federer for the first time in more than two years, but just hours before the match Federer withdrew due to a stomach virus. Instead he played lucky loser and countryman Horacio Zeballos and lost in straight sets.

Del Potro then competed in his first clay-court tournament since 2013 at the BMW Open in Munich in late April. He beat Dustin Brown, in two sets and Jan-Lennard Struff in his first three-set match of the year but lost to Philipp Kohlschreiber in the quarterfinals in straight sets. At Madrid Open he had his best victory after coming back on the tour, defeating 14th seed Dominic Thiem in straight sets but lost his next match to Jack Sock in two sets. At Stuttgart Open, his first grass tournament since the 2013 Wimbledon Championships, he beat Grigor Dimitrov in straight sets, John Millman in two sets and Gilles Simon in three sets, before losing to Kohlschreiber in straight sets in the semis.

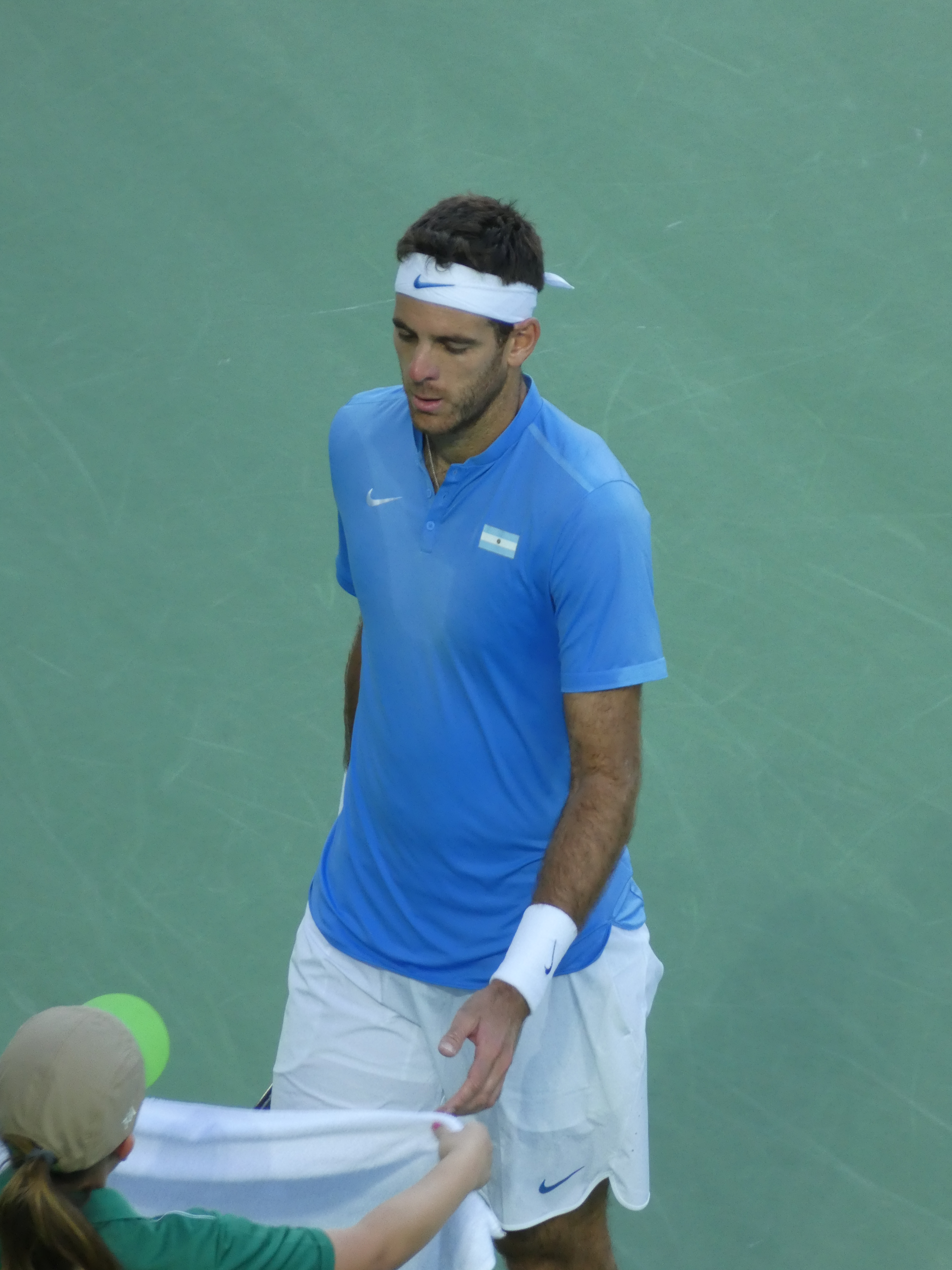
Del Potro at the 2016 Summer Olympics

At Wimbledon he beat Stephane Robert and Stanislas Wawrinka (in four sets). Del Potro then lost in an ill-tempered four-set match against 32nd seed Lucas Pouille in the third round.

In the 2016 Olympic Games, held at the Olympic Tennis Centre in Rio de Janeiro, del Potro defeated top seed and world No. 1, Novak Djokovic, in the first round, winning two tiebreaks. It was a significant win for him because he was ranked no. 145 in the world and was coming back from an injury. He also defeated João Sousa, Taro Daniel in three sets and top-20 player Bautista Agut to guarantee a medal match. He played 2008 gold medalist and the 2016 doubles gold medalist, Rafael Nadal. He defeated him in three tight sets to guarantee a medal. Del Potro played in his first gold medal match against the reigning Wimbledon champion from the previous month, Andy Murray and lost in four grueling sets in over four hours. However, del Potro said after beating Nadal "I already won silver, that's good enough for me."

At the US Open Del Potro's ranking of No. 141 was not sufficient to gain direct entry into the main draw but he was granted a wild card. He beat countryman Diego Schwartzman in straight sets, 19th seed and top-ranked American Steve Johnson in straight sets, 11th seed and Grand Slam finalist David Ferrer in straight sets and eighth seed Dominic Thiem (when Thiem retired during the second set). Del Potro then lost to eventual champion Stan Wawrinka in the quarterfinals in four sets.

Del Potro then played against Murray, in a rematch of the Olympic final, in the Davis Cup semifinal, held in Glasgow. Del Potro won the thrilling five-set match in 5 hours and 7 minutes. Del Potro was granted a wildcard for the Shanghai Masters in October, where he lost in the first round in three sets to 11th seed David Goffin, despite being a set and a break up. Del Potro was given a wild card into the Stockholm Open and beat John Isner, Nicolas Almagro, Ivo Karlovic, Grigor Dimitrov and Jack Sock to win his first title since his return from injury. Del Potro then played at the Swiss Indoors, where he comfortably beat qualifier Robin Haase in the first round. He then got revenge on Goffin in a straight sets win, before falling in two tight sets to Kei Nishikori in the quarterfinals.

Vying for Argentina's first title, del Potro played in the 2016 Davis Cup against Croatia. His first match was a four set victory against Ivo Karlović. Partnering Leonardo Mayer, del Potro lost in doubles against Ivan Dodig and Marin Čilić. 2–1 down in matches, del Potro played in singles against Čilić, coming back from two sets down for the first time in his career to win in five sets. Described as one of the best Davis Cup comebacks ever, del Potro levelled the score at 2–2, paving the way for Federico Delbonis to complete the comeback by beating Ivo Karlović, in straight sets, thus claiming Argentina's first ever Davis Cup title.

For the second time in his career, after 2011, del Potro was named ATP Comeback Player of the Year.

=== 2017: 20th title, US Open semifinal ===
Del Potro decided to skip the 2017 Australian Open and made his season debut at the Delray Beach Open, where he was seeded in a tournament for the first time in three years, at No. 7, and won his first three matches against Kevin Anderson, Damir Dzumhur and Sam Querrey. However, in the semifinals, del Potro lost to top seed and world No. 4 Milos Raonic in straight sets. Next, del Potro played in the Mexican Open, where he was drawn to play qualifier Frances Tiafoe, who idolised del Potro when he was a child. Del Potro won in a tight three-set match. In the next round, del Potro lost in three sets to Djokovic after winning the first set.

At the Indian Wells Masters he beat his Argentine Davis Cup teammate Federico Delbonis in two tight sets before losing to Djokovic in three sets. At the Miami Open, he had a comfortable victory over Robin Haase before losing to Roger Federer in straight sets. Del Potro began his clay-court season at the Estoril Open, where he beat Yuichi Sugita for the loss of just four games in the first round, but withdrew the next day after he heard that his grandfather had died. Del Potro withdrew from the Madrid Open, reappearing at the Italian Open where he reached the quarterfinals of a Masters 1000 tournament for the first time since the 2013 Paris Masters, following victories over 10th seed Grigor Dimitrov, Kyle Edmund and seventh seed Kei Nishikori, which was his first victory in 2017 over a top 10 ranked player. However, he succumbed yet again to world No. 2, Novak Djokovic, in a rain-interrupted straight sets match.

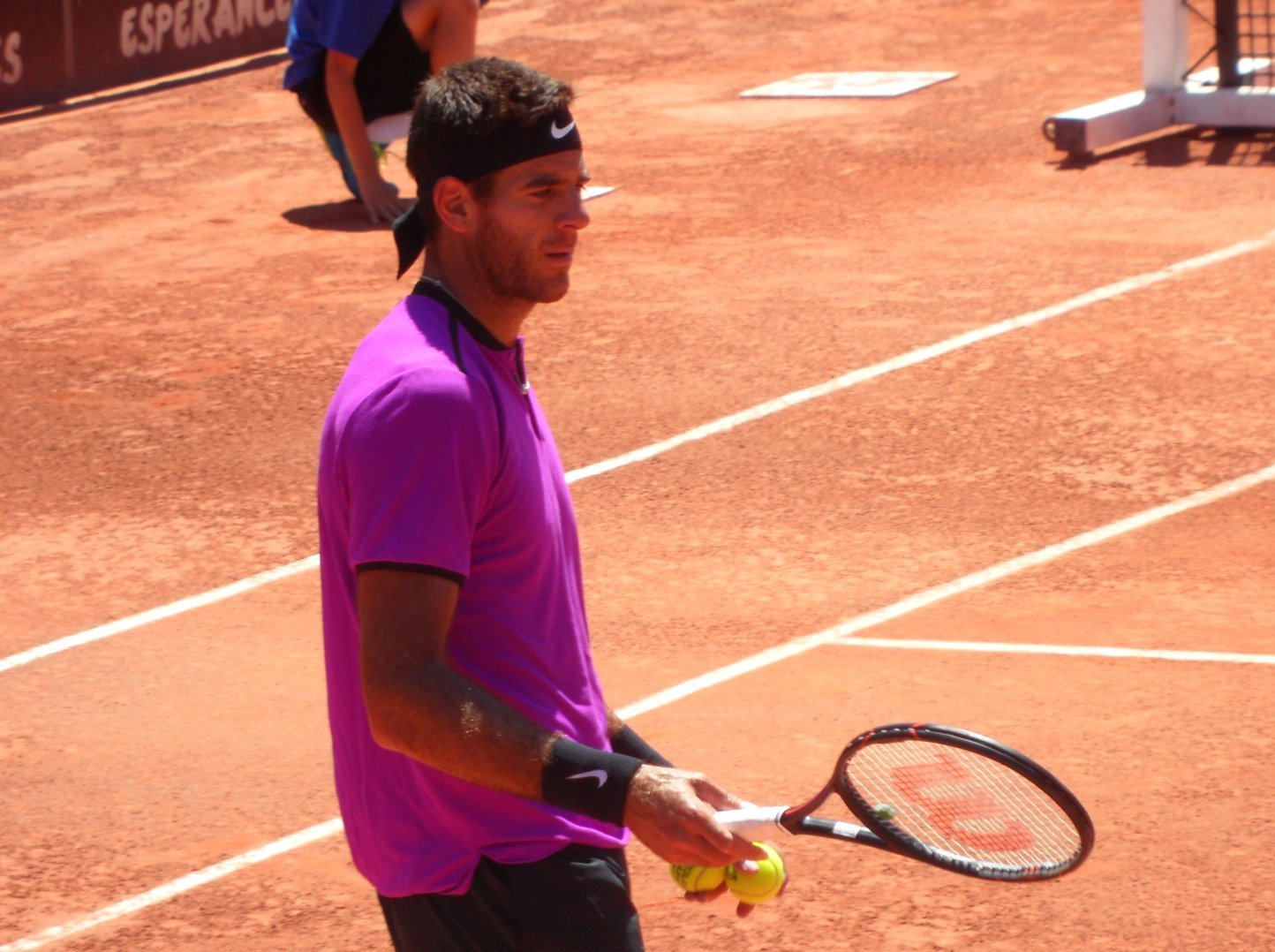
Del Potro at the 2017 Lyon Open

In May at Lyon Open, del Potro defeated lucky loser Quentin Halys, but lost in the next round against Portuguese qualifier Gastão Elias in straight sets. Doubt was cast over his participation at the French Open because of a back injury that had hampered him at Lyon, but he eventually decided to partake in the event. Del Potro entered the event after a five-year absence as the 29th seed, the first time since the 2014 Australian Open that he was seeded at a Grand Slam tournament. In the first round he defeated Guido Pella in straight sets, and in the second round against Nicolás Almagro, it was one set apiece before Almagro retired. Del Potro eventually fell in straight sets to top seed Andy Murray in the third round.

After suffering a second round exit at Wimbledon in straight sets against Ernests Gulbis, Del Potro began his summer North American hardcourt season in Washington, where he lost to Kei Nishikori in the third round, ending his 15-match winning streak at the event. He then lost in two sets to Denis Shapovalov in the second round at the Canadian Open in Montreal, and at the Cincinnati Masters he won against Tomáš Berdych in the first round and qualifier Mitchell Krueger in the second before losing to eventual champion Grigor Dimitrov in the third round.

At the US Open, Del Potro defeated Henri Laaksonen, Adrián Menéndez-Maceiras and Roberto Bautista Agut in straight sets. He began his fourth round match against Dominic Thiem struggling, falling two sets behind. However, he then raised his level and, with the help of the crowd, eventually prevailed in five sets, saving two match points in the fourth set with two aces. In the post match interview he admitted he considered retiring from the match during the second set.

The US Open account on Instagram switched his racquet for Thor's hammer using software editing tools, which created a new nickname for the Argentine: Juan Martin "del Thortro", by fellow tennis player Roger Federer, adding to a collection of nicknames such as "Delpo", "Tower of Tandil", "Palito" (stick) and "Enano" (midget). In the quarterfinals he defeated Roger Federer in four tight sets; his second victory over the Swiss at the US Open, having beaten him in the final in 2009. By doing so he reached his first major semifinal since Wimbledon 2013. His run came to an end in four sets, losing to world No. 1, Rafael Nadal.

Del Potro began his Asian hard court swing in Beijing, where he lost in straight sets to Grigor Dimitrov in the second round, his second loss against the Bulgarian. This was followed by the Shanghai Masters, where he reached the semifinals of a Masters 1000 event for the first time since 2013 (also in Shanghai), most notably upsetting Alexander Zverev in the third round, his second triumph over a Top 5 ranked opponent after his victory over Roger Federer at the US Open. Del Potro won the first set but eventually lost in the semifinals against Federer, who would go on to win the tournament.

Del Potro defended his 2016 Stockholm Open title by defeating Grigor Dimitrov in the finals of the 2017 Stockholm Open in straight sets. This victory gave Del Potro his 20th ATP career title. He then reached the final of Basel, where he faced Federer and again lost in three sets after winning the first. Del Potro then made it to the quarterfinals of the Paris Masters, where he was one win away from entering the top 10 and qualifying for the ATP Finals, which would have been his first time since 2013 participating in the year-end tournament. However, he was defeated in three sets by John Isner and subsequently declined to be chosen as an alternate for the tournament, instead choosing to rest with his family and friends in his native Tandil. Nevertheless, Del Potro won 730 points in a span of three weeks and reached the 11th spot of the ATP rankings.

=== 2018: First Masters, second US Open final, world No. 3, injuries ===
Del Potro started the season at the ASB Classic in New Zealand, where he beat Denis Shapovalov to return to the top 10 of the ATP rankings for the first time since August 2014. Del Potro then defeated Karen Khachanov and David Ferrer en route to the final, where he lost to Roberto Bautista Agut in three sets. At the Australian Open he lost in the third round against Tomáš Berdych. At the Delray Beach Open he was seeded second but lost in the second round to eventual champion Frances Tiafoe. He then won the Acapulco Open, defeating Kevin Anderson in straight sets to obtain his 21st title, and his biggest title since 2013 Swiss Indoors.

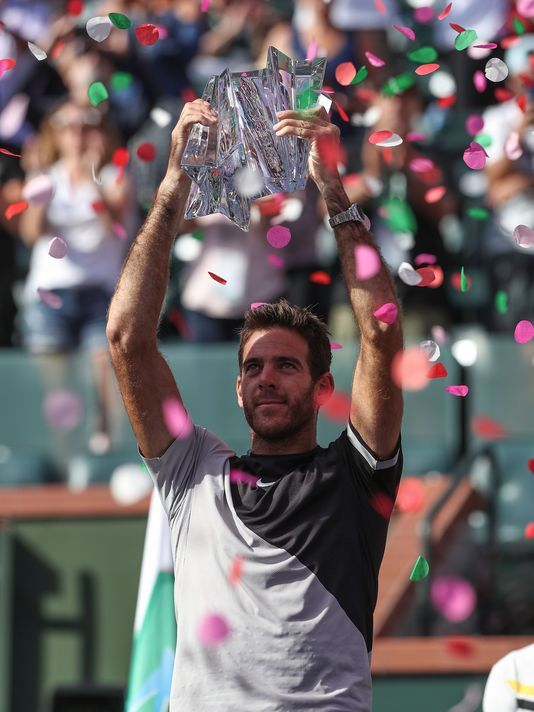
Del Potro at the 2018 BNP Paribas Open, where he won his first Masters 1000 title of his career

His winning streak would not stop there, however, as he went on to win the Indian Wells Open, the first Masters 1000 tournament of his career, beating teenager Alex De Minaur, veteran David Ferrer, compatriot Leonardo Mayer, Philipp Kohlschreiber, Milos Raonic and reigning champion and world No. 1, Roger Federer in the final. Del Potro prevailed in three sets despite Federer serving for the match in the decider and holding three championship points. This was del Potro's biggest achievement in the ATP Tour after the 2009 US Open.

Del Potro continued his successful run at the Miami Open, beating Robin Haase, Kei Nishikori and Filip Krajinović, before prevailing in a grueling match against Milos Raonic, reaching the semifinals. His 15-match win streak ended as he was defeated by eventual champion John Isner.

Del Potro returned to the courts in early May for the clay court season, although his first results were lackluster. After starting the Madrid Open with a solid victory against Bosnian Damir Džumhur in the second round, he was upset by qualifier Dušan Lajović in three sets. In his next tournament in Rome, del Potro defeated rising star Stefanos Tsitsipas before retiring against David Goffin in the next round due to a groin injury. His participation at the French Open was in doubt but he recovered in time and entered the tournament as the fifth seed. Following victories against French players Nicolas Mahut and Julien Benneteau, he defeated 31st seed Albert Ramos Viñolas and world No. 10, John Isner, en route to a quarterfinal clash against world No. 4 and frequent rival, Marin Čilić. After an intense match, in which he had an argument with a fan who supposedly heckled him, Del Potro defeated Čilić in four sets and reached the semifinals, the first time since 2009. He then lost to ten-times French Open champion Rafael Nadal in straight sets. His run to the semifinals ensured that, for the first time since February 2014, Del Potro would return to his career-best ranking of world No. 4.

At Wimbledon, Del Potro defeated Peter Gojowczyk, Feliciano Lopez and Benoît Paire, before a long four set win over 2 days against Gilles Simon. World No. 1 Rafael Nadal defeated him in five sets in the quarters after del Potro had led two sets to one. Del Potro then competed at the Los Cabos Open, where he reached the final but lost to second-seeded Fabio Fognini in straight sets. Del Potro moved up to a new career-high ranking of world No. 3 as of the week of 13 August. Del Potro was seeded fourth at Cincinnati, defeating Chung Hyeon and Nick Kyrgios before falling to David Goffin in the quarterfinals.

Entering the US Open seeded third, del Potro reached the quarterfinals without dropping a set, defeating Donald Young, Denis Kudla, 31st seed Fernando Verdasco, and 20th seed Borna Ćorić. He then faced 11th seed John Isner, defeating him in four sets to reach his second consecutive US Open semifinal, where he faced top seed and defending champion Rafael Nadal in a rematch of the previous year's semifinal. Nadal retired from the match due to a knee injury after del Potro took the first two sets. With this victory, del Potro advanced to his second Grand Slam final, nine years after his 2009 US Open triumph. He was defeated by two-time champion Novak Djokovic in three straight sets.

Del Potro entered the China Open in October as the top seed. He defeated Albert Ramos Viñolas, Karen Khachanov, Filip Krajinović, and reached the final without dropping a set after Fabio Fognini withdrew before the semifinal. He faced unseeded Nikoloz Basilashvili in the final, losing in two sets. He then competed in the Shanghai Masters seeded third. He defeated Richard Gasquet and faced 13th seed Borna Ćorić in the third round, narrowly dropping the first set before he retired due to a knee injury. This injury forced his withdrawal from the rest of the season, including the ATP Finals, for which he had qualified for the first time since 2013.

=== 2019–2021: Continued injuries ===
Del Potro's injury lingered into the 2019 season, forcing him to withdraw from the Australian Open. He made his comeback at the Delray Beach Open in February where he reached the quarterfinals, losing to Mackenzie McDonald in three sets. Still not having recovered from injury, Del Potro chose not to defend his titles in Acapulco and Indian Wells, withdrawing from both tournaments. Playing in his first tournament back at the Madrid Open, del Potro lost his first match to Laslo Djere. He then played in Rome and secured wins against David Goffin, who had a 3–1 lead over him before the match, and Casper Ruud. He failed to convert two match points in a second set tiebreaker to ultimately lose his quarterfinal against world No. 1 Novak Djokovic over a three-hour match.

At the 2019 French Open, del Potro was seeded eighth. After wins in the first three rounds against Nicolás Jarry, Yoshihito Nishioka and Jordan Thompson respectively he lost in the fourth round to tenth-seeded Karen Khachanov in four sets. In his first grass-court tournament of the season at Queen's Club, del Potro suffered another career-threatening injury when he fractured his kneecap in his first round match against Denis Shapovalov.

Del Potro did not play any professional tennis from June 2019 at Queen's Club until 2022 at the Argentina Open. He underwent four right knee surgeries (June 2019, January 2020, August 2020 and March 2021) and withdrew from the Tokyo Olympics in July 2021. At the 2021 US Open, del Potro reported that his knee was getting better, he had picked up training on the court again and hoped to be ready to play on the tour within a couple of months.

=== 2022: Return to professional tennis, potential retirement ===
On 31 January, it was announced that Del Potro will make his return to professional tennis at the Argentina Open, where he accepted a wildcard. He also accepted a wildcard to play the Rio Open.

On 5 February, Del Potro stated in a press conference that he would likely retire after the Argentina Open. He cited ongoing knee pain due to an injury as a reason behind the potential retirement, and said that his return is "maybe more of a farewell than a comeback". Del Potro lost in the first round of the Argentina Open to Federico Delbonis, and again hinted at retirement in the post-match interview. He withdrew from the 2022 Rio Open on 11 February. Del Potro has not played any matches since; he dropped out of the singles rankings on 20 June, as well as the doubles rankings on 9 May.

=== 2023–2024: Failed comeback at the US Open, farewell exhibition match ===
In March, he stated that he would begin training for a potential return at the 2023 US Open. In August, he announced that he would not be able to compete in the tournament, due to his physical state.

Del Potro took part in a farewell exhibition match titled 'The Last Challenge' against Novak Djokovic in Buenos Aires on 1 December 2024. In front of 15,000 spectators, he won in straight sets.

== Playing style ==
Del Potro was an offensive baseliner with a very powerful serve and heavy groundstrokes, using his notably powerful forehand to push his opponents deep into or off the court. His forehand was one of his main strengths and was one the most powerful in the game, capable of frequently generating speeds more than 160 km/h.

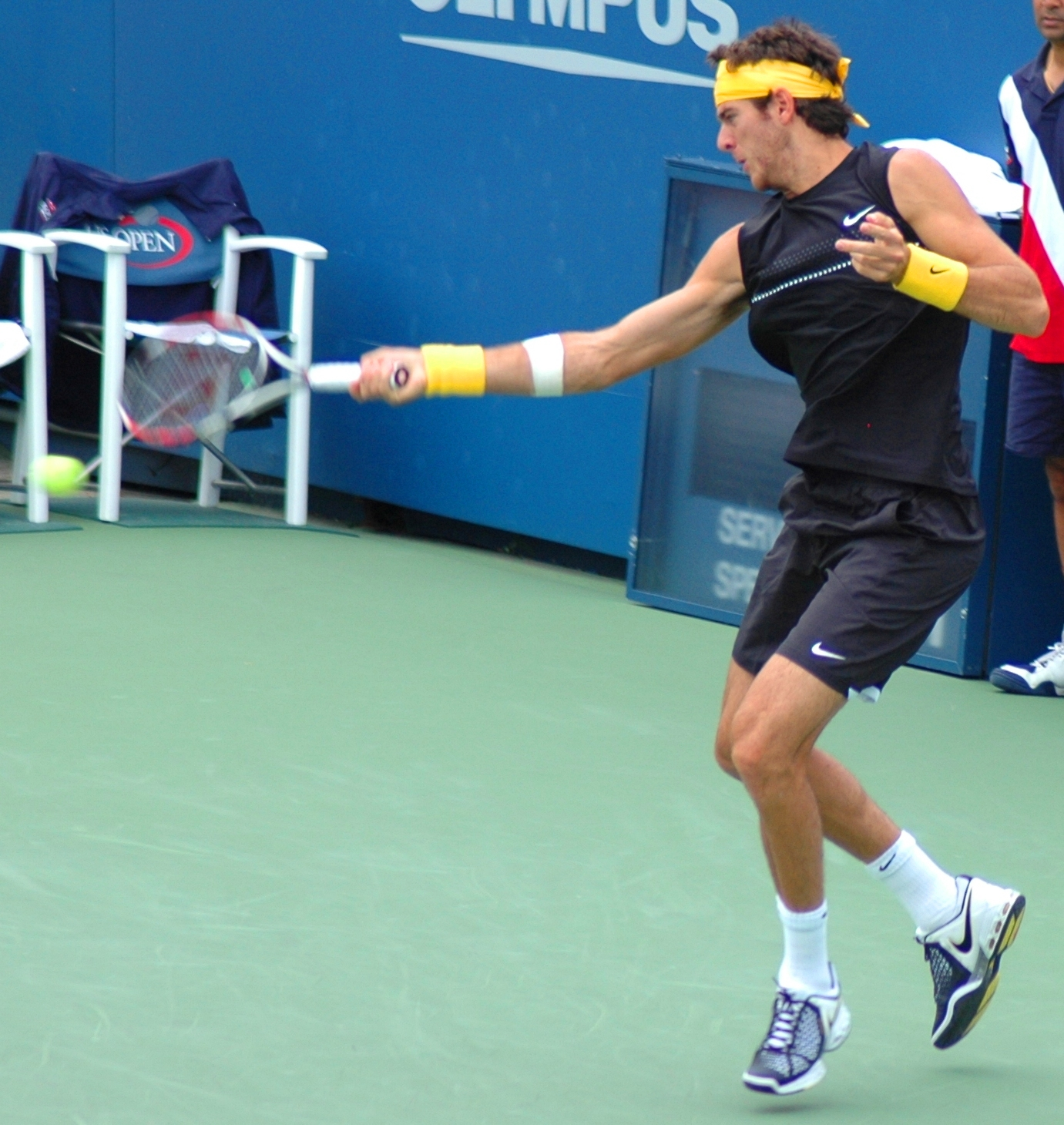
Del Potro hits a forehand.

It was widely considered among the top three best forehands on tour by fellow players and analysts, alongside Roger Federer and Rafael Nadal.

Although he possessed a very consistent and powerful double-handed backhand, injury and surgeries on his wrist rendered his backhand the main weakness in his game. Since his return in 2016, del Potro made tactical changes in his game in order to protect his wrist, like significantly reducing the pace of his two-hander and adopting a one-handed slice. Despite del Potro admitting that relying on slices is "not my game," the shot was effective in moving his opponents out of position and slowing down rallies enough to allow him to set up powerful offensive shots with his forehand. Furthermore, to compensate for the newfound vulnerability in his backhand wing, del Potro improved the power and accuracy of his other shots, most notably his serve.

== Equipment and apparel ==
Del Potro used the Wilson Hyper ProStaff 6.1 Midplus Stretch early on in his career, and has continued to use this racquet under new paint jobs years later. Del Potro is very superstitious, and after suffering a wrist injury shortly after switching to the Wilson BLX Pro Tour paint job in 2010, he returned to playing with the then outdated Wilson K-Factor 6.1 95 paint job. He particularly favored the exact racquets he had used to win his only Grand Slam title at the 2009 US Open. He again refused to update his racquet to the Wilson BLX Juice Pro in 2012, and in 2014 had only a few K-Factor racquets left. He makes use of the same racket painted to resemble the Wilson ProStaff 97. For strings, he uses Luxilon ALU Power strung at 58 lbs.

His clothing sponsor was Nike. He used to wear sleeveless shirts, but later on has worn crew shirts, and often also sports double-wide wristbands and a bandana. For shoes, he wears Nike Air Max Cages.

== Record against the Big Four ==
Del Potro has a combined 20–51 record against all members of the Big Four, which is one of the best in this category. He is also one of the few to have won at least three matches against each of the four.

=== Roger Federer ===
Del Potro has a 7–18 record against Roger Federer, and a 4–2 record in finals. Besides the 2009 US Open title, del Potro also captured the 2012 and 2013 Swiss Indoors finals and the 2018 Indian Wells final, while Federer won the 2012 Rotterdam Open and the 2017 Basel Open. Federer won their five-set meeting at the 2009 French Open semifinals, and the longest best-of-three-set match in history at the 2012 Olympic semifinal, 19–17 in the deciding set. Del Potro prevailed in the 2017 US Open quarterfinals against Federer in four sets.

=== Novak Djokovic ===
Del Potro has a 4–16 record against Novak Djokovic. Djokovic won their first four meetings, before back to back victories for del Potro at the 2011 Davis Cup and their bronze medal match at the 2012 Summer Olympics in straight sets. In 2013 Djokovic won an epic five-setter at the 2013 Wimbledon Championships semifinals and a three-setter at the 2013 Shanghai Masters final, while del Potro defeated Djokovic en route to his second Masters 1000 final, at the 2013 Indian Wells Masters. Del Potro upset Djokovic in the first round at the 2016 Rio Olympics en route to the silver medal. Djokovic defeated Del Potro in three close sets in the final of the 2018 US Open, which was the first grand slam final for Del Potro since his victory at the 2009 US Open. Three of his four victories have come via national representation tournaments.

=== Rafael Nadal ===
Del Potro has a 6–11 record against Rafael Nadal. He bested Nadal in the semifinals en route to his 2009 US Open title, which was the first time a player managed to beat both Roger Federer and Nadal in the same Grand Slam tournament (Novak Djokovic subsequently did the same at the 2011 US Open). However, the Spaniard managed to win both times in the Indian Wells Masters encounters, in the 2011 semifinal and the 2013 final. Nadal also won the fourth and last rubber of the 2011 Davis Cup final against the Argentine. Del Potro gained the upper hand at the 2013 Shanghai Masters, defeating Nadal to reach the final where he lost to Djokovic. Del Potro defeated Nadal in a third set tiebreak in the semifinal of the 2016 Olympics in Rio de Janeiro, while Nadal stopped Del Potro's 2017 US Open run, defeating him in a four-set semifinal. In the quarterfinals of 2018 Wimbledon, Nadal came from two sets to one down to defeat Del Potro in an epic five-set match. In their last meeting, Del Potro advanced to the final of the 2018 US Open when Nadal had to retire, while trailing by two sets to love.

=== Andy Murray ===
Del Potro has a 3–7 record against Andy Murray. They only played two finals. The first was in the 2009 Rogers Cup, which was won by Murray. However, when del Potro beat Murray in the quarterfinals of the 2013 BNP Paribas Open, del Potro won against all members of the Big Four in 2013. In their second final, del Potro lost to Murray in the 2016 Summer Olympics. However, during Argentina's Davis Cup semi-final tie against Great Britain, del Potro got revenge by beating Andy Murray in a five-set thriller that was, for each man, the longest match of his career.

== Personal life ==
Del Potro dated singer Jimena Barón from April 2017 until February 2018. Del Potro dated model Sofia Jimenez from December 2018 until their breakup in May 2020.

In 2022, it was revealed that Daniel del Potro (Juan Martín's late father) had misappropriated US$30 million of his son's career earnings while managing his financial affairs. A documentary on Juan Martín was directed by Rodolfo Lamboglia and released in 2023.

In May 2013 del Potro met Pope Francis, a fellow Argentine, after Mass at the Vatican in Rome and described it as an incredible experience which he would never forget. He is Catholic.

== Career statistics ==
=== Grand Slam tournament performance timeline ===
Key
W	F	SF	QF	#R	RR	Q#	DNQ	A	NH

(W) winner; (F) finalist; (SF) semifinalist; (QF) quarterfinalist; (#R) rounds 4, 3, 2, 1; (RR) round-robin stage; (Q#) qualification round; (DNQ) did not qualify; (A) absent; (NH) not held; (SR) strike rate (events won / competed); (W–L) win–loss record.
To avoid confusion and double counting, these charts are updated at the conclusion of a tournament or when the player's participation has ended.

Tournament	2005	2006	2007	2008	2009	2010	2011	2012	2013	2014	2015	2016	2017	2018	2019	SR	W–L	Win %
Australian Open	A	A	2R	2R	QF	4R	2R	QF	3R	2R	A	A	A	3R	A	0 / 9	19–9	68%
French Open	A	1R	1R	2R	SF	A	3R	QF	A	A	A	A	3R	SF	4R	0 / 9	22–9	71%
Wimbledon	A	A	2R	2R	2R	A	4R	4R	SF	A	A	3R	2R	QF	A	0 / 9	21–9	70%
US Open	Q1	1R	3R	QF	W	A	3R	QF	2R	A	A	QF	SF	F	A	1 / 10	35–9	80%
Win–loss	0–0	0–2	4–4	7–4	17–3	3–1	8–4	15–4	8–3	1–1	0–0	6–2	8–3	17–4	3–1	1 / 37	97–36	73%

=== Grand Slam tournament finals ===
==== Singles: 2 (1 title, 1 runner-up) ====
Result	Year	Championship	Surface	Opponent	Score
Win	2009	US Open	Hard	(Switzerland) Roger Federer	3–6, 7–6^{(7–5)}, 4–6, 7–6^{(7–4)}, 6–2
Loss	2018	US Open	Hard	(Serbia) Novak Djokovic	3–6, 6–7^{(4–7)}, 3–6

=== Olympic gold medal matches ===
==== Singles: 1 (1 silver medal) ====
Result	Year	Championship	Surface	Opponent	Score
Loss	2016	Summer Olympics, Rio de Janeiro	Hard	(United Kingdom) Andy Murray	5–7, 6–4, 2–6, 5–7

=== Year-end championships finals ===
==== Singles: 1 (1 runner-up) ====
Result	Year	Championship	Surface	Opponent	Score
Loss	2009	ATP World Tour Finals, UK	Hard (i)	(Russia) Nikolay Davydenko	3–6, 4–6

=== Masters 1000 finals ===
==== Singles: 4 (1 title, 3 runner-ups) ====
Result	Year	Tournament	Surface	Opponent	Score
Loss	2009	Canadian Open	Hard	(United Kingdom) Andy Murray	7–6^{(7–4)}, 6–7^{(3–7)}, 1–6
Loss	2013	Indian Wells Masters	Hard	(Spain) Rafael Nadal	6–4, 3–6, 4–6
Loss	2013	Shanghai Masters	Hard	(Serbia) Novak Djokovic	1–6, 6–3, 6–7^{(3–7)}
Win	2018	Indian Wells Masters	Hard	(Switzerland) Roger Federer	6–4, 6–7^{(8–10)}, 7–6^{(7–2)}

== Notes ==
Awards
Preceded by Juan Curuchet & Walter Pérez; Paula Pareto	Olimpia de Oro; 2009; 2016	Succeeded by Luciana Aymar; Delfina Pignatiello
Preceded by (Netherlands) Robin Haase (France) Benoît Paire	ATP Comeback Player of the Year; 2011; 2016	Succeeded by (Germany) Tommy Haas (Switzerland) Roger Federer
