= 2009 Novak Djokovic tennis season =

- Full name: Novak Djokovic
- Country: Serbia
- Calendar prize money: $5,476,472 (singles & doubles)

Singles
- Season record: 78–19
- Calendar titles: 5
- Year-end ranking: No. 3
- Ranking change from previous year: Steady

Grand Slam & significant results
- Australian Open: QF
- French Open: 3R
- Wimbledon: QF
- US Open: SF
- Other tournaments
- Tour Finals: RR

Doubles
- Season record: 6–5
- Calendar titles: 0
- Current ranking: No. 114
- Ranking change from previous year: ▲465

Davis Cup
- Davis Cup: 1R

The 2009 Novak Djokovic tennis season commenced on January 5 with the start of the 2009 ATP World Tour.

== Yearly summary ==
=== Early hard court season ===
Djokovic started the year at the Brisbane International, where he was upset by fellow Pilić academy trainee Ernests Gulbis in the first round.

==== Australian Open ====
As defending champion at the Australian Open, Djokovic retired from his quarterfinal match with former world No. 1 Andy Roddick when trailing 6-7, 6-4, 6-2, 2-1., primarily due to heat illness that generated muscle aches and cramps.

==== Dubai Tennis Championships ====
After losing in the semifinals of the Open 13 tournament in Marseille to Tsonga, Djokovic won the singles title at the Dubai Championships, defeating Ferrer to claim his twelfth career title.

==== Indian Wells Open ====
The following week, Djokovic was the defending champion at the Indian Wells Masters but lost to Roddick in the quarterfinals.

==== Indian Wells Open ====
At the Miami Open in Key Biscayne, Djokovic beat Federer in the semifinals, before losing to Murray in the final.

=== Clay court season ===
==== Monte-Carlo Masters ====
Djokovic reached the final of the next Masters event, the Monte-Carlo Masters on clay, losing to Nadal in the final.

==== Italian Open ====
At the Italian Open in Rome, Djokovic failed to defend the title he had won the previous year, losing to Nadal in the final again.

==== Madrid Open ====
Djokovic was the top seed at his hometown tournament, the Serbia Open in Belgrade, beating Łukasz Kubot in the final to win his second title of the year. Djokovic then reached the semifinals of the Madrid Open without dropping a set, where he lost to Nadal despite holding three match points. The match, at 4 hours and 3 minutes, was at the time the longest three-set singles match on the ATP Tour in the Open Era.

==== Roland Garros ====
At the French Open, he lost in the third round to German Philipp Kohlschreiber.

=== Grass court season ===
Djokovic began his grass court season at the Gerry Weber Open where after the withdrawal of Federer, he competed as the top seed. He advanced to the final, where he lost to Tommy Haas.

==== Wimbledon ====
Djokovic then lost to Haas again, this time in the quarterfinals of Wimbledon.

=== Fall hard court season ===
During the US Open Series, Djokovic made the quarterfinals of the Canadian Open in Montreal before losing to Roddick. At the Cincinnati Masters, Djokovic defeated Nadal in the semifinals before losing in the final to Federer. At the US Open, Djokovic reached the semifinals, where he was defeated by Federer.

Djokovic then won his third title of the year at the China Open in Beijing, beating Marin Čilić in the final. Djokovic then lost in the semifinals of the inaugural Shanghai Masters to Davydenko.

=== Swiss Indoors ===
At the Swiss Indoors in Basel, Djokovic recorded his first 6–0, 6–0 win at an elite event when he defeated Jan Hernych in the second round. He then defeat home player Wawrinka in the quarterfinals before saving three match to win his semifinal against Radek Štěpánek. In the final, he defeated home favorite and three-time defending champion Federer to win his fourth title of the year.

==== Paris Masters ====
Djokovic won his first Masters title of the year at the Paris Masters after defeating Nadal in the semifinals, and outlasting Gaël Monfils in a decisive set tiebreak in the final.

==== ATP Finals ====
Even though he came into the year-ending ATP Finals in London on a 10-match winning streak and as the defending champion, Djokovic failed to make it out from the round-robin stage despite beating both Davydenko and Nadal due to having fewer sets.

Djokovic ended the year as the No. 3 for the third consecutive year, having played 97 matches, the most of any player on the ATP Tour, which earned him the Ironman nickname, with a 78–19 win–loss record. In addition to leading the ATP Tour in match wins, he reached a career-best ten finals, winning five titles.

== All matches ==
This table chronicles all the matches of Djokovic in 2009, including walkovers (W/O) which the ATP does not count as wins. They are marked ND for non-decision or no decision.

Key
W	F	SF	QF	#R	RR	Q#	P#	DNQ	A	Z#	PO	G	S	B	NMS	NTI	P	NH

(W) winner; (F) finalist; (SF) semifinalist; (QF) quarterfinalist; (#R) rounds 4, 3, 2, 1; (RR) round-robin stage; (Q#) qualification round; (P#) preliminary round; (DNQ) did not qualify; (A) absent; (Z#) Davis/Fed Cup Zonal Group (with number indication) or (PO) play-off; (G) gold, (S) silver or (B) bronze Olympic/Paralympic medal; (NMS) not a Masters tournament; (NTI) not a Tier I tournament; (P) postponed; (NH) not held; (SR) strike rate (events won / competed); (W–L) win–loss record.
To avoid confusion and double counting, these charts are updated at the conclusion of a tournament or when the player's participation has ended.

=== Singles matches ===
Tournament	#	Round	Opponent	Rank	Result	Score
Brisbane International; Brisbane, Australia; ATP 250; Hard, outdoor January 5, 2009
Brisbane International; Brisbane, Australia; ATP 250; Hard, outdoor January 5, 2009	1 / 254	1R	(Latvia) Ernests Gulbis	53	Loss	4–6, 4–6
Medibank International Sydney; Sydney, Australia; ATP 250; Hard, outdoor January 12, 2009		1R	Bye			
Medibank International Sydney; Sydney, Australia; ATP 250; Hard, outdoor January 12, 2009	2 / 255	2R	(France) Paul-Henri Mathieu	29	Win	6–1, 6–2
Medibank International Sydney; Sydney, Australia; ATP 250; Hard, outdoor January 12, 2009	3 / 256	QF	(Croatia) Mario Ančić	35	Win	6–3, 6–4
Medibank International Sydney; Sydney, Australia; ATP 250; Hard, outdoor January 12, 2009	4 / 257	SF	(Finland) Jarkko Nieminen	40	Loss	4–6, 6–7^{(7–3)}
Australian Open; Melbourne, Australia; Grand Slam tournament Hard, outdoor January 19, 2009
Australian Open; Melbourne, Australia; Grand Slam tournament Hard, outdoor January 19, 2009	5 / 258	1R	(Italy) Andrea Stoppini	220	Win	6–2, 6–3, 7–5
Australian Open; Melbourne, Australia; Grand Slam tournament Hard, outdoor January 19, 2009	6 / 259	2R	(France) Jérémy Chardy	68	Win	7–5, 6–1, 6–3
Australian Open; Melbourne, Australia; Grand Slam tournament Hard, outdoor January 19, 2009	7 / 260	3R	(United States) Amer Delić	127	Win	6–2, 4–6, 6–3, 7–6^{(7–4)}
Australian Open; Melbourne, Australia; Grand Slam tournament Hard, outdoor January 19, 2009	8 / 261	4R	(Cyprus) Marcos Baghdatis	97	Win	6–1, 7–6^{(7–1)}, 6–7^{(5–7)}, 6–2
Australian Open; Melbourne, Australia; Grand Slam tournament Hard, outdoor January 19, 2009	9 / 262	QF	(United States) Andy Roddick	9	Loss	7–6^{(7–3)}, 4–6, 2–6, 1–2 Ret.
Open 13; Marseille, France; ATP 250; Hard, indoor February 16, 2009
Open 13; Marseille, France; ATP 250; Hard, indoor February 16, 2009	10 / 263	1R	(France) Jérémy Chardy	55	Win	7–6^{(7–4)}, 6–4
Open 13; Marseille, France; ATP 250; Hard, indoor February 16, 2009	11 / 264	2R	(Czech Republic) Jan Hernych	68	Win	7–5, 6–4
Open 13; Marseille, France; ATP 250; Hard, indoor February 16, 2009	12 / 265	QF	(Germany) Mischa Zverev	76	Win	6–3, 6–3
Open 13; Marseille, France; ATP 250; Hard, indoor February 16, 2009	13 / 266	SF	(France) Jo-Wilfried Tsonga	12	Loss	4–6, 6–7^{(1–7)}
Dubai Tennis Championships; Dubai, UAE; ATP 500; Hard, outdoor February 23, 2009
Dubai Tennis Championships; Dubai, UAE; ATP 500; Hard, outdoor February 23, 2009	14 / 267	1R	(Italy) Flavio Cipolla	125	Win	6–3, 6–2
Dubai Tennis Championships; Dubai, UAE; ATP 500; Hard, outdoor February 23, 2009	15 / 268	2R	(Czech Republic) Jan Hernych	66	Win	6–3, 3–6, 6–4
Dubai Tennis Championships; Dubai, UAE; ATP 500; Hard, outdoor February 23, 2009	16 / 269	QF	(Croatia) Marin Čilić	19	Win	6–3, 6–4
Dubai Tennis Championships; Dubai, UAE; ATP 500; Hard, outdoor February 23, 2009	17 / 270	SF	(France) Gilles Simon	8	Win	3–6, 7–5, 7–5
Dubai Tennis Championships; Dubai, UAE; ATP 500; Hard, outdoor February 23, 2009	18 / 271	W	(Spain) David Ferrer	14	Win (1)	7–5, 6–3
Davis Cup World Group; 1st Round: Spain vs Serbia; Benidorm, Spain; Davis Cup; Clay, outdoor March 6, 2009	19 / 272	1R; R1	(Spain) David Ferrer	12	Loss	3–6, 3–6, 6–7^{(4–7)}
Davis Cup World Group; 1st Round: Spain vs Serbia; Benidorm, Spain; Davis Cup; Clay, outdoor March 6, 2009	20 / 273	1R; R4	(Spain) Rafael Nadal	1	Loss	4–6, 4–6, 1–6
BNP Paribas Open; Indian Wells, United States; ATP World Tour Masters 1000; Hard, outdoor March 9, 2009		1R	Bye			
BNP Paribas Open; Indian Wells, United States; ATP World Tour Masters 1000; Hard, outdoor March 9, 2009	21 / 274	2R	(Argentina) Martín Vassallo Argüello	54	Win	7–5, 6–4
BNP Paribas Open; Indian Wells, United States; ATP World Tour Masters 1000; Hard, outdoor March 9, 2009	22 / 275	3R	(Germany) Tommy Haas	64	Win	6–2, 7–6^{(7–1)}
BNP Paribas Open; Indian Wells, United States; ATP World Tour Masters 1000; Hard, outdoor March 9, 2009	23 / 276	4R	(Switzerland) Stan Wawrinka	16	Win	7–6^{(9–7)}, 7–6^{(8–6)}
BNP Paribas Open; Indian Wells, United States; ATP World Tour Masters 1000; Hard, outdoor March 9, 2009	24 / 277	QF	(United States) Andy Roddick	7	Loss	3–6, 2–6
Sony Ericsson Open; Miami, United States; ATP World Tour Masters 1000; Hard, outdoor March 23, 2009		1R	Bye			
Sony Ericsson Open; Miami, United States; ATP World Tour Masters 1000; Hard, outdoor March 23, 2009	25 / 278	2R	(Canada) Frank Dancevic	117	Win	6–3, 6–2
Sony Ericsson Open; Miami, United States; ATP World Tour Masters 1000; Hard, outdoor March 23, 2009	26 / 279	3R	(France) Paul-Henri Mathieu	33	Win	6–4, 6–1
Sony Ericsson Open; Miami, United States; ATP World Tour Masters 1000; Hard, outdoor March 23, 2009	27 / 280	4R	(Czech Republic) Tomáš Berdych	22	Win	6–3, 6–2
Sony Ericsson Open; Miami, United States; ATP World Tour Masters 1000; Hard, outdoor March 23, 2009	28 / 281	QF	(France) Jo-Wilfried Tsonga	11	Win	6–3, 6–4
Sony Ericsson Open; Miami, United States; ATP World Tour Masters 1000; Hard, outdoor March 23, 2009	29 / 282	SF	(Switzerland) Roger Federer	2	Win	3–6, 6–2, 6–3
Sony Ericsson Open; Miami, United States; ATP World Tour Masters 1000; Hard, outdoor March 23, 2009	30 / 283	F	(United Kingdom) Andy Murray	4	Loss (1)	2–6, 5–7
Monte-Carlo Rolex Masters; Monte Carlo, Monaco; ATP World Tour Masters 1000; Clay, outdoor April 13, 2009		1R	Bye			
Monte-Carlo Rolex Masters; Monte Carlo, Monaco; ATP World Tour Masters 1000; Clay, outdoor April 13, 2009	31 / 284	2R	(Spain) Óscar Hernández	65	Win	6–1, 6–2
Monte-Carlo Rolex Masters; Monte Carlo, Monaco; ATP World Tour Masters 1000; Clay, outdoor April 13, 2009	32 / 285	3R	(Spain) Albert Montañés	36	Win	6–1, 6–7^{(4–7)}, 6–0
Monte-Carlo Rolex Masters; Monte Carlo, Monaco; ATP World Tour Masters 1000; Clay, outdoor April 13, 2009	33 / 286	QF	(Spain) Fernando Verdasco	8	Win	6–2, 4–6, 6–3
Monte-Carlo Rolex Masters; Monte Carlo, Monaco; ATP World Tour Masters 1000; Clay, outdoor April 13, 2009	34 / 287	SF	(Switzerland) Stan Wawrinka	16	Win	4–6, 6–1, 6–3
Monte-Carlo Rolex Masters; Monte Carlo, Monaco; ATP World Tour Masters 1000; Clay, outdoor April 13, 2009	35 / 288	F	(Spain) Rafael Nadal	1	Loss (2)	3–6, 6–2, 1–6
Internazionali BNL d'Italia; Rome, Italy; ATP World Tour Masters 1000; Clay, outdoor April 27, 2009		1R	Bye			
Internazionali BNL d'Italia; Rome, Italy; ATP World Tour Masters 1000; Clay, outdoor April 27, 2009	36 / 289	2R	(Spain) Albert Montañés	33	Win	7–6^{(7–5)}, 6–0
Internazionali BNL d'Italia; Rome, Italy; ATP World Tour Masters 1000; Clay, outdoor April 27, 2009	37 / 290	3R	(Spain) Tommy Robredo	17	Win	6–1, 6–1
Internazionali BNL d'Italia; Rome, Italy; ATP World Tour Masters 1000; Clay, outdoor April 27, 2009	38 / 291	QF	(Argentina) Juan Martín del Potro	5	Win	6–3, 6–4
Internazionali BNL d'Italia; Rome, Italy; ATP World Tour Masters 1000; Clay, outdoor April 27, 2009	39 / 292	SF	(Switzerland) Roger Federer	2	Win	4–6, 6–3, 6–3
Internazionali BNL d'Italia; Rome, Italy; ATP World Tour Masters 1000; Clay, outdoor April 27, 2009	40 / 293	F	(Spain) Rafael Nadal	1	Loss (3)	6–7^{(2–7)}, 2–6
Serbia Open; Belgrade, Serbia; ATP World Tour 250; Clay, outdoor May 3, 2009		1R	Bye			
Serbia Open; Belgrade, Serbia; ATP World Tour 250; Clay, outdoor May 3, 2009	41 / 294	2R	(Serbia) Janko Tipsarević	63	Win	6–2, 4–6, 6–0
Serbia Open; Belgrade, Serbia; ATP World Tour 250; Clay, outdoor May 3, 2009	42 / 295	QF	(Serbia) Viktor Troicki	38	Win	6–3, 6–2
Serbia Open; Belgrade, Serbia; ATP World Tour 250; Clay, outdoor May 3, 2009	43 / 296	SF	(Italy) Andreas Seppi	36	Win	4–6, 6–1, 6–2
Serbia Open; Belgrade, Serbia; ATP World Tour 250; Clay, outdoor May 3, 2009	44 / 297	W	(Poland) Łukasz Kubot	179	Win (2)	6–3, 7–6^{(7–0)}
Mutua Madrileña Madrid Open; Madrid, Spain; ATP World Tour Masters 1000; Clay, outdoor May 5, 2009		1R	Bye			
Mutua Madrileña Madrid Open; Madrid, Spain; ATP World Tour Masters 1000; Clay, outdoor May 5, 2009	45 / 298	2R	(Spain) Óscar Hernández	65	Win	6–3, 6–3
Mutua Madrileña Madrid Open; Madrid, Spain; ATP World Tour Masters 1000; Clay, outdoor May 5, 2009	46 / 299	3R	(Italy) Andreas Seppi	36	Win	6–4, 6–4
Mutua Madrileña Madrid Open; Madrid, Spain; ATP World Tour Masters 1000; Clay, outdoor May 5, 2009	47 / 300	QF	(Croatia) Ivan Ljubičić	54	Win	6–3, 6–4
Mutua Madrileña Madrid Open; Madrid, Spain; ATP World Tour Masters 1000; Clay, outdoor May 5, 2009	48 / 301	SF	(Spain) Rafael Nadal	1	Loss	6–3, 6–7^{(5–7)}, 6–7^{(9–11)}
French Open; Paris, France; Grand Slam tournament Clay, outdoor May 25, 2009
French Open; Paris, France; Grand Slam tournament Clay, outdoor May 25, 2009	49 / 302	1R	(Ecuador) Nicolás Lapentti	102	Win	6–3, 3–1 Ret.
French Open; Paris, France; Grand Slam tournament Clay, outdoor May 25, 2009	50 / 303	2R	(Ukraine) Sergiy Stakhovsky	110	Win	6–3, 6–4, 6–1
French Open; Paris, France; Grand Slam tournament Clay, outdoor May 25, 2009	51 / 304	3R	(Germany) Philipp Kohlschreiber	31	Loss	4–6, 4–6, 4–6
Gerry Weber Open; Halle, Germany; ATP World Tour 250; Grass, outdoor June 8, 2009
Gerry Weber Open; Halle, Germany; ATP World Tour 250; Grass, outdoor June 8, 2009	52 / 305	1R	(Italy) Simone Bolelli	66	Win	7–5, 6–2
Gerry Weber Open; Halle, Germany; ATP World Tour 250; Grass, outdoor June 8, 2009	53 / 306	2R	(France) Florent Serra	56	Win	5–7, 7–5, 6–1
Gerry Weber Open; Halle, Germany; ATP World Tour 250; Grass, outdoor June 8, 2009	54 / 307	QF	(Austria) Jürgen Melzer	28	Win	6–1, 6–4
Gerry Weber Open; Halle, Germany; ATP World Tour 250; Grass, outdoor June 8, 2009	55 / 308	SF	(Belgium) Olivier Rochus	136	Win	7–6^{(9–7)}, 6–4
Gerry Weber Open; Halle, Germany; ATP World Tour 250; Grass, outdoor June 8, 2009	56 / 309	F	(Germany) Tommy Haas	41	Loss (4)	3–6, 7–6^{(7–4)}, 1–6
Wimbledon Championships; London, England; Grand Slam tournament Grass, outdoor June 22, 2009
Wimbledon Championships; London, England; Grand Slam tournament Grass, outdoor June 22, 2009	57 / 310	1R	(France) Julien Benneteau	81	Win	6–7^{(8–10)}, 7–6^{(7–1)}, 6–2, 6–4
Wimbledon Championships; London, England; Grand Slam tournament Grass, outdoor June 22, 2009	58 / 311	2R	(Germany) Simon Greul	106	Win	7–5, 6–1, 6–4
Wimbledon Championships; London, England; Grand Slam tournament Grass, outdoor June 22, 2009	59 / 312	3R	(United States) Mardy Fish	25	Win	6–4, 6–4, 6–4
Wimbledon Championships; London, England; Grand Slam tournament Grass, outdoor June 22, 2009	60 / 313	4R	(Israel) Dudi Sela	46	Win	6–2, 6–4, 6–1
Wimbledon Championships; London, England; Grand Slam tournament Grass, outdoor June 22, 2009	61 / 314	QF	(Germany) Tommy Haas	34	Loss	5–7, 6–7^{(6–8)}, 6–4, 3–6
Rogers Cup; Montreal, Canada; ATP World Tour Masters 1000; Hard, outdoor August 10, 2009		1R	Bye			
Rogers Cup; Montreal, Canada; ATP World Tour Masters 1000; Hard, outdoor August 10, 2009	62 / 315	2R	(Canada) Peter Polansky	225	Win	6–4, 7–6^{(8–6)}
Rogers Cup; Montreal, Canada; ATP World Tour Masters 1000; Hard, outdoor August 10, 2009	63 / 316	3R	(Russia) Mikhail Youzhny	65	Win	6–3, 6–4
Rogers Cup; Montreal, Canada; ATP World Tour Masters 1000; Hard, outdoor August 10, 2009	64 / 317	QF	(United States) Andy Roddick	5	Loss	4–6, 6–7^{(4–7)}
Western & Southern Financial Group Masters; Cincinnati, USA; ATP World Tour Masters 1000; Hard, outdoor August 17, 2009		1R	Bye			
Western & Southern Financial Group Masters; Cincinnati, USA; ATP World Tour Masters 1000; Hard, outdoor August 17, 2009	65 / 318	2R	(Croatia) Ivan Ljubičić	54	Win	7–6^{(7–5)}, 6–4
Western & Southern Financial Group Masters; Cincinnati, USA; ATP World Tour Masters 1000; Hard, outdoor August 17, 2009	66 / 319	3R	(France) Jérémy Chardy	35	Win	7–5, 6–3
Western & Southern Financial Group Masters; Cincinnati, USA; ATP World Tour Masters 1000; Hard, outdoor August 17, 2009	67 / 320	QF	(France) Gilles Simon	9	Win	6–4, 7–5
Western & Southern Financial Group Masters; Cincinnati, USA; ATP World Tour Masters 1000; Hard, outdoor August 17, 2009	68 / 321	SF	(Spain) Rafael Nadal	3	Win	6–1, 6–4
Western & Southern Financial Group Masters; Cincinnati, USA; ATP World Tour Masters 1000; Hard, outdoor August 17, 2009	69 / 322	F	(Switzerland) Roger Federer	1	Loss (5)	1–6, 5–7
US Open; New-York, USA; Grand Slam tournament Hard, outdoor August 31, 2009
US Open; New-York, USA; Grand Slam tournament Hard, outdoor August 31, 2009	70 / 323	1R	(Croatia) Ivan Ljubičić	51	Win	6–3, 6–1, 6–3
US Open; New-York, USA; Grand Slam tournament Hard, outdoor August 31, 2009	71 / 324	2R	(Australia) Carsten Ball	155	Win	6–3, 6–4, 6–4
US Open; New-York, USA; Grand Slam tournament Hard, outdoor August 31, 2009	72 / 325	3R	(United States) Jesse Witten	276	Win	6–7^{(2–7)}, 6–3, 7–6^{(7–2)}, 6–4
US Open; New-York, USA; Grand Slam tournament Hard, outdoor August 31, 2009	73 / 326	4R	(Czech Republic) Radek Štěpánek	16	Win	6–1, 6–3, 6–3
US Open; New-York, USA; Grand Slam tournament Hard, outdoor August 31, 2009	74 / 327	QF	(Spain) Fernando Verdasco	10	Win	7–6^{(7–2)}, 1–6, 7–5, 6–2
US Open; New-York, USA; Grand Slam tournament Hard, outdoor August 31, 2009	75 / 328	SF	(Switzerland) Roger Federer	1	Loss	6–7^{(3–7)}, 5–7, 5–7
China Open; Beijing, China; ATP 500; Hard, outdoor October 5, 2009
China Open; Beijing, China; ATP 500; Hard, outdoor October 5, 2009	76 / 329	1R	(Romania) Victor Hănescu	27	Win	6–3, 7–5
China Open; Beijing, China; ATP 500; Hard, outdoor October 5, 2009	77 / 330	2R	(Serbia) Viktor Troicki	28	Win	6–3, 6–0
China Open; Beijing, China; ATP 500; Hard, outdoor October 5, 2009	78 / 331	QF	(Spain) Fernando Verdasco	9	Win	6–3, 1–6, 6–1
China Open; Beijing, China; ATP 500; Hard, outdoor October 5, 2009	79 / 332	SF	(Sweden) Robin Söderling	11	Win	6–3, 6–3
China Open; Beijing, China; ATP 500; Hard, outdoor October 5, 2009	80 / 333	W	(Croatia) Marin Čilić	15	Win (3)	6–2, 7–6^{(7–4)}
Shanghai Masters; Shanghai, China; ATP World Tour Masters 1000; Hard, outdoor October 12, 2009		1R	Bye			
Shanghai Masters; Shanghai, China; ATP World Tour Masters 1000; Hard, outdoor October 12, 2009	81 / 334	2R	(Italy) Fabio Fognini	66	Win	6–3, 6–1
Shanghai Masters; Shanghai, China; ATP World Tour Masters 1000; Hard, outdoor October 12, 2009	82 / 335	3R	(Germany) Rainer Schüttler	99	Win	6–1, 6–1
Shanghai Masters; Shanghai, China; ATP World Tour Masters 1000; Hard, outdoor October 12, 2009	83 / 336	QF	(France) Gilles Simon	10	Win	6–3, 2–6, 6–2
Shanghai Masters; Shanghai, China; ATP World Tour Masters 1000; Hard, outdoor October 12, 2009	84 / 337	SF	(Russia) Nikolay Davydenko	8	Loss	6–4, 4–6, 6–7^{(1–7)}
Swiss Indoors; Basel, Switzerland; ATP 500; Hard, indoor November 2, 2009
Swiss Indoors; Basel, Switzerland; ATP 500; Hard, indoor November 2, 2009	85 / 338	1R	(Germany) Andreas Beck	33	Win	6–3, 7–5
Swiss Indoors; Basel, Switzerland; ATP 500; Hard, indoor November 2, 2009	86 / 339	2R	(Czech Republic) Jan Hernych	59	Win	6–0, 6–0
Swiss Indoors; Basel, Switzerland; ATP 500; Hard, indoor November 2, 2009	87 / 340	QF	(Switzerland) Stan Wawrinka	21	Win	3–6, 7–6^{(7–5)}, 6–2
Swiss Indoors; Basel, Switzerland; ATP 500; Hard, indoor November 2, 2009	88 / 341	SF	(Czech Republic) Radek Štěpánek	14	Win	6–7^{(4–7)}, 7–5, 6–2
Swiss Indoors; Basel, Switzerland; ATP 500; Hard, indoor November 2, 2009	89 / 342	W	(Switzerland) Roger Federer	1	Win (4)	6–4, 4–6, 6–2
BNP Paribas Masters; Paris, France; ATP World Tour Masters 1000; Hard, indoor November 9, 2009		1R	Bye			
BNP Paribas Masters; Paris, France; ATP World Tour Masters 1000; Hard, indoor November 9, 2009	90 / 343	2R	(Argentina) Juan Mónaco	30	Win	6–3, 7–5
BNP Paribas Masters; Paris, France; ATP World Tour Masters 1000; Hard, indoor November 9, 2009	91 / 344	3R	(France) Arnaud Clément	93	Win	6–2, 6–2
BNP Paribas Masters; Paris, France; ATP World Tour Masters 1000; Hard, indoor November 9, 2009	92 / 345	QF	(Sweden) Robin Söderling	10	Win	6–4, 1–6, 6–3
BNP Paribas Masters; Paris, France; ATP World Tour Masters 1000; Hard, indoor November 9, 2009	93 / 346	SF	(Spain) Rafael Nadal	2	Win	6–2, 6–3
BNP Paribas Masters; Paris, France; ATP World Tour Masters 1000; Hard, indoor November 9, 2009	94 / 347	W	(France) Gaël Monfils	16	Win (5)	6–2, 5–7, 7–6^{(7–3)}
ATP World Tour Finals; London, England; Year-end Championships; Hard, indoor November 23, 2009
ATP World Tour Finals; London, England; Year-end Championships; Hard, indoor November 23, 2009	95 / 348	RR	(Russia) Nikolay Davydenko	7	Win	3–6, 6–4, 7–5
ATP World Tour Finals; London, England; Year-end Championships; Hard, indoor November 23, 2009	96 / 349	RR	(Sweden) Robin Söderling	9	Loss	6–7^{(5–7)}, 1–6
ATP World Tour Finals; London, England; Year-end Championships; Hard, indoor November 23, 2009	97 / 350	RR	(Spain) Rafael Nadal	2	Win	7–6^{(7–5)}, 6–3

- Source

=== Doubles matches ===
Tournament	Match	Round	Opponents (seed or key)	Ranks	Result	Score
Monte Carlo Rolex Masters; Monte Carlo, Monaco; ATP 1000; Clay, outdoor 13 – 19 April 2009; Partner: (Serbia) Viktor Troicki
Monte Carlo Rolex Masters; Monte Carlo, Monaco; ATP 1000; Clay, outdoor 13 – 19 April 2009; Partner: (Serbia) Viktor Troicki	1 / 44	1R	(Brazil) Marcelo Melo / (Brazil) André Sá	22 / 23	Win	6–1, 6–4
Monte Carlo Rolex Masters; Monte Carlo, Monaco; ATP 1000; Clay, outdoor 13 – 19 April 2009; Partner: (Serbia) Viktor Troicki	2 / 45	2R	(South Africa) Jeff Coetzee / (Australia) Jordan Kerr	14 / 29	Win	6–4, 6–4
Monte Carlo Rolex Masters; Monte Carlo, Monaco; ATP 1000; Clay, outdoor 13 – 19 April 2009; Partner: (Serbia) Viktor Troicki	3 / 46	QF	(India) Mahesh Bhupathi / (Australia) Mark Knowles	10 / 9	Win	6–4, 4–6, [12–10]
Monte Carlo Rolex Masters; Monte Carlo, Monaco; ATP 1000; Clay, outdoor 13 – 19 April 2009; Partner: (Serbia) Viktor Troicki	4 / 47	SF	(Canada) Daniel Nestor / (Serbia) Nenad Zimonjić	3 / 4	Loss	6–3, 1–6, [5–10]
Mutua Madrileña Madrid Open; Madrid, Spain; ATP 1000; Clay, outdoor 11 – 17 May 2009; Partner: (Serbia) Dušan Vemić
Mutua Madrileña Madrid Open; Madrid, Spain; ATP 1000; Clay, outdoor 11 – 17 May 2009; Partner: (Serbia) Dušan Vemić	5 / 48	1R	(South Africa) Jeff Coetzee / (Australia) Jordan Kerr	22 / 26	Win	7–6^{(7–4)}, 6–3
Mutua Madrileña Madrid Open; Madrid, Spain; ATP 1000; Clay, outdoor 11 – 17 May 2009; Partner: (Serbia) Dušan Vemić	6 / 49	2R	(Brazil) Marcelo Melo / (Brazil) André Sá	20 / 21	Win	6–2, 7–6^{(11–9)}
Mutua Madrileña Madrid Open; Madrid, Spain; ATP 1000; Clay, outdoor 11 – 17 May 2009; Partner: (Serbia) Dušan Vemić	7 / 50	QF	(Sweden) Simon Aspelin / (South Africa) Wesley Moodie	37 / 30	Loss	6–4, 3–6, [9–11]
Gerry Weber Open; Halle, Germany; ATP 250; Grass, outdoor 7 – 13 June 2009; Partner: (Serbia) Viktor Troicki
Gerry Weber Open; Halle, Germany; ATP 250; Grass, outdoor 7 – 13 June 2009; Partner: (Serbia) Viktor Troicki	8 / 51	1R	(Austria) Julian Knowle / (Austria) Jürgen Melzer	37 / 45	Win	7–5, 3–6, [10–6]
Gerry Weber Open; Halle, Germany; ATP 250; Grass, outdoor 7 – 13 June 2009; Partner: (Serbia) Viktor Troicki	9 / 52	2R	(Germany) Nicolas Kiefer / (Germany) Mischa Zverev	140 / 44	Loss	1–6, 1–6
ATP Studena Croatia Open Umag; Umag, Croatia; ATP 250; Clay, outdoor 27 July – 2 August 2009; Partner: (Serbia) Marko Djokovic
ATP Studena Croatia Open Umag; Umag, Croatia; ATP 250; Clay, outdoor 27 July – 2 August 2009; Partner: (Serbia) Marko Djokovic	10 / 53	1R	(Italy) Fabio Fognini / (Italy) Potito Starace	195 / 79	Loss	0–6, 5–7
Rogers Cup; Montreal, Canada; ATP 1000; Hard, outdoor 10 – 16 August 2010; Partner: (Serbia) Dušan Vemić
Rogers Cup; Montreal, Canada; ATP 1000; Hard, outdoor 10 – 16 August 2010; Partner: (Serbia) Dušan Vemić	11 / 54	1R	(Spain) Rafael Nadal / (Spain) Francisco Roig	122 / –	Loss	5–7, 4–6

- Source

== Yearly records ==
=== Head-to-head matchups ===
Novak Djokovic had a 15–12 record against the top 10, a 44–18 record against the top 50 and a 34–1 record against players outside the top 50.

=== Finals ===
==== Singles: 10 (5–5) ====
Category Grand Slam (0–0) ATP World Tour Finals (0–0) ATP World Tour Masters 1000 (1–4) ATP World Tour 500 (3–0) ATP World Tour 250 (1–1)	Titles by surface Hard (4–1) Clay (2–1) Grass (0–1)	Titles by conditions Outdoors (3–5) Indoors (2–0)

Outcome	No.	Date	Tournament	Tier	Surface	Opponent in the final	Score in the final
Win	12–6	Feb 2009	Dubai Championships, UAE	500 series	Hard	(Spain) David Ferrer	7–5, 6–3
Loss	12–7	Apr 2009	Miami Open, United States	Masters	Hard	(United Kingdom) Andy Murray	2–6, 5–7
Loss	12–8	Apr 2009	Monte-Carlo Masters, France	Masters	Clay	(Spain) Rafael Nadal	3–6, 6–2, 1–6
Loss	12–9	May 2009	Italian Open, Italy	Masters	Clay	(Spain) Rafael Nadal	6–7^{(2–7)}, 2–6
Win	13–9	May 2009	Serbia Open, Serbia	250 Series	Clay	(Poland) Łukasz Kubot	6–3, 7–6^{(7–0)}
Loss	13–10	Jun 2009	Halle Open, Germany	250 Series	Grass	(Germany) Tommy Haas	3–6, 7–6^{(7–4)}, 1–6
Loss	13–11	Aug 2009	Cincinnati Masters, United States	Masters	Hard	(Switzerland) Roger Federer	1–6, 5–7
Win	14–11	Oct 2009	China Open, China	500 series	Hard	(Croatia) Marin Čilić	6–2, 7–6^{(7–4)}
Win	15–11	Nov 2009	Swiss Indoors, Switzerland	500 series	Hard (i)	(Switzerland) Roger Federer	6–4, 4–6, 6–2
Win	16–11	Nov 2009	Paris Masters, France	Masters	Hard (i)	(France) Gaël Monfils	6–2, 5–7, 7–6^{(7–3)}

== See also ==
- 2009 ATP World Tour
- 2009 Roger Federer tennis season
- 2009 Rafael Nadal tennis season
