= 2025 Swiss Indoors – Singles =

Singles
- 2025 Swiss Indoors

Final
- Champion: (Brazil) João Fonseca
- Runner-up: (Spain) Alejandro Davidovich Fokina
- Score: 6–3, 6–4

Details
- Draw: 32 (4 Q / 3 WC )
- Seeds: 8

Events
Singles	Doubles
← 2024 ·	Swiss Indoors	· 2026 →

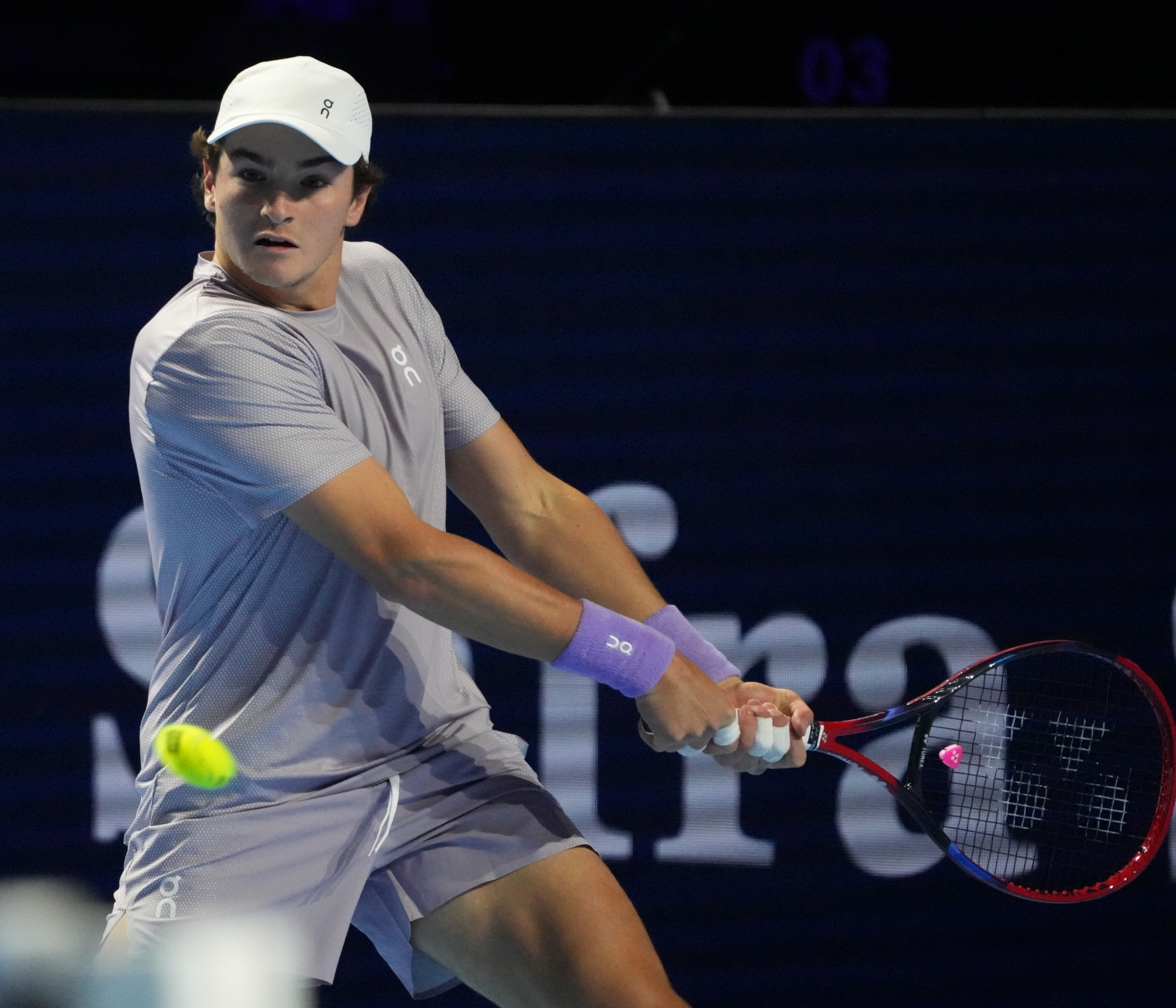
Fonseca at 2025 Basel, youngest champion since 1989

João Fonseca defeated Alejandro Davidovich Fokina in the final, 6–3, 6–4 to win the singles tennis title at the 2025 Swiss Indoors. It was his second ATP Tour title and first ATP 500 title. Fonseca was the second-youngest champion in tournament history, after Jim Courier in 1989, and the third-youngest ATP 500 champion since the current format was introduced in 2009. Fonseca was also the first Brazilian to win an ATP 500 tournament since Gustavo Kuerten in 2001.

Giovanni Mpetshi Perricard was the defending champion, but lost in the first round to Fonseca.

== Seeds ==
1. (United States) Taylor Fritz (second round)
2. (United States) Ben Shelton (second round)
3. (Denmark) Holger Rune (withdrew)
4. (Norway) Casper Ruud (quarterfinals, retired)
5. (Canada) Félix Auger-Aliassime (quarterfinals, retired)
6. (Czech Republic) Jiří Lehečka (first round)
7. (Czech Republic) Jakub Menšík (second round, withdrew)
8. (Spain) Alejandro Davidovich Fokina (final)
9. (Canada) Denis Shapovalov (quarterfinals, retired)

== Draw ==
Key

- Q = Qualifier
- WC = Wild card
- LL = Lucky loser
- Alt = Alternate
- ITF = ITF entry
- PR = Protected ranking
- SR = Special ranking
- SE = Special exempt
- JE = Junior exempt
- JR = Junior Accelerator Programme entrant
- CO = College Accelerator Programme entrant
- NG = Next Gen Accelerator Program entrant
- w/o = Walkover
- r = Retired
- d = Defaulted

=== Finals ===
Semifinals
(France) Ugo Humbert	6^{4}	1^{r}
8	(Spain) Alejandro Davidovich Fokina	7^{7}	3
(Brazil) João Fonseca	7^{7}	7
(Spain) Jaume Munar	6^{4}	5

Final
8	(Spain) Alejandro Davidovich Fokina	3	4
(Brazil) João Fonseca	6	6

=== Top half ===
First round
1	(United States) T Fritz	4	7^{7}	7
WC	(Monaco) V Vacherot	6	6^{4}	5
(United States) S Korda	3	4
(France) U Humbert	6	6
(Argentina) S Báez	3	4
Q	(United States) R Opelka	6	6
LL	(Netherlands) B van de Zandschulp	6	6
6	(Czech Republic) J Lehečka	2	2
4	(Norway) C Ruud	6	7^{7}
LL	(France) Q Halys	1	6^{3}
(Serbia) M Kecmanović	1	6^{3}
WC	(Switzerland) S Wawrinka	6	7^{7}
PR	(United States) J Brooksby	6	6
(France) A Müller	4	3
(Italy) L Sonego	6^{2}	4
8	(Spain) A Davidovich Fokina	7^{7}	6

Second round
1	(United States) T Fritz	3	4
(France) U Humbert	6	6
Q	(United States) R Opelka	7^{7}	6^{7}	6
LL	(Netherlands) B van de Zandschulp	6^{5}	7^{9}	3
4	(Norway) C Ruud	6	7^{7}
WC	(Switzerland) S Wawrinka	4	6^{5}
PR	(United States) J Brooksby	7^{8}	4	5
8	(Spain) A Davidovich Fokina	6^{6}	6	7

Quarterfinals
(France) U Humbert	7^{7}	6
Q	(United States) R Opelka	6^{0}	4
4	(Norway) C Ruud	6^{1}	0^{r}
8	(Spain) A Davidovich Fokina	7^{7}	0

Semifinals
(France) U Humbert	6^{4}	1^{r}
8	(Spain) A Davidovich Fokina	7^{7}	3

=== Bottom half ===
First round
7	(Czech Republic) J Menšík	7^{7}	6^{7}	6
WC	(Switzerland) H Bernet	6^{1}	7^{9}	3
(France) G Mpetshi Perricard	6^{6}	3
(Brazil) J Fonseca	7^{8}	6
SE	(Belgium) R Collignon	4	6^{5}
LL	(France) V Royer	6	7^{7}
(United States) M Giron	7^{7}	0	6^{4}
9	(Canada) D Shapovalov	6^{3}	6	7^{7}
5	(Canada) F Auger-Aliassime	6	7
(Canada) G Diallo	2	5
LL	(Belgium) D Goffin	6^{9}	5
Q	(Croatia) M Čilić	7^{11}	7
Q	(Switzerland) R Bertola	2	4
(Spain) J Munar	6	6
Q	(Poland) K Majchrzak	7^{7}	3	6^{7}
2	(United States) B Shelton	6^{2}	6	7^{9}

Second round
7	(Czech Republic) J Menšík
(Brazil) J Fonseca	w/o
LL	(France) V Royer	6^{3}	2
9	(Canada) D Shapovalov	7^{7}	6
5	(Canada) F Auger-Aliassime	7^{7}	7^{7}
Q	(Croatia) M Čilić	6^{2}	6^{2}
(Spain) J Munar	6	6
2	(United States) B Shelton	3	4

Quarterfinals
(Brazil) J Fonseca	3	6	4
9	(Canada) D Shapovalov	6	3	1^{r}
5	(Canada) F Auger-Aliassime	3	0^{r}
(Spain) J Munar	6	0

Semifinals
(Brazil) J Fonseca	7^{7}	7
(Spain) J Munar	6^{4}	5

== Qualifying ==
=== Seeds ===
1. (France) Adrian Mannarino (first round)
2. (United States) Reilly Opelka (qualified)
3. (Argentina) Francisco Comesaña (first round)
4. (France) Valentin Royer (qualifying competition, lucky loser)
5. (Italy) Mattia Bellucci (first round)
6. (Poland) Kamil Majchrzak (qualified)
7. (Australia) Adam Walton (first round)
8. (France) Quentin Halys (qualifying competition, lucky loser)

=== Qualifiers ===
1. (Switzerland) Rémy Bertola
2. (United States) Reilly Opelka
3. (Croatia) Marin Čilić
4. (Poland) Kamil Majchrzak

=== Lucky losers ===
1. (France) Quentin Halys
2. (Netherlands) Botic van de Zandschulp
3. (Belgium) David Goffin
4. (France) Valentin Royer

=== Qualifying draw ===
==== First qualifier ====
First round
1	(France) Adrian Mannarino	1	2
WC	(Switzerland) Rémy Bertola	6	6
(Kazakhstan) Alexander Shevchenko	3	7^{7}	6^{2}
8	(France) Quentin Halys	6	6^{4}	7^{7}

Qualifying competition
WC	(Switzerland) Rémy Bertola	6	6
8	(France) Quentin Halys	4	4

==== Second qualifier ====
First round
2	(United States) Reilly Opelka	6^{6}	7^{11}	7
WC	(Switzerland) Mika Brunold	7^{8}	6^{9}	5
(Netherlands) Botic van de Zandschulp	7^{8}	6
5	(Italy) Mattia Bellucci	6^{6}	4

Qualifying competition
2	(United States) Reilly Opelka	6	6
(Netherlands) Botic van de Zandschulp	4	4

==== Third qualifier ====
First round
3	(Argentina) Francisco Comesaña	2	6^{4}
(Belgium) David Goffin	6	7^{7}
(Croatia) Marin Čilić	6	6
7	(Australia) Adam Walton	4	1

Qualifying competition
(Belgium) David Goffin	1	6^{4}
(Croatia) Marin Čilić	6	7^{7}

==== Fourth qualifier ====
First round
4	(France) Valentin Royer	7^{7}	6
WC	(Switzerland) Marc-Andrea Hüsler	6^{5}	1
(Spain) Pedro Martínez	4	4
6	(Poland) Kamil Majchrzak	6	6

Qualifying competition
4	(France) Valentin Royer	4	5
6	(Poland) Kamil Majchrzak	6	7
