= 2024 Swiss Indoors =

- Date: 21–27 October
- Edition: 53rd
- Category: ATP Tour 500
- Draw: 32S / 16D
- Prize money: €2,385,100
- Surface: Hard / indoor
- Location: Basel, Switzerland
- Venue: St. Jakobshalle

Champions

Singles
- (France) Giovanni Mpetshi Perricard

Doubles
- (United Kingdom) Jamie Murray / (Australia) John Peers
← 2023 ·	Swiss Indoors	· 2025 →

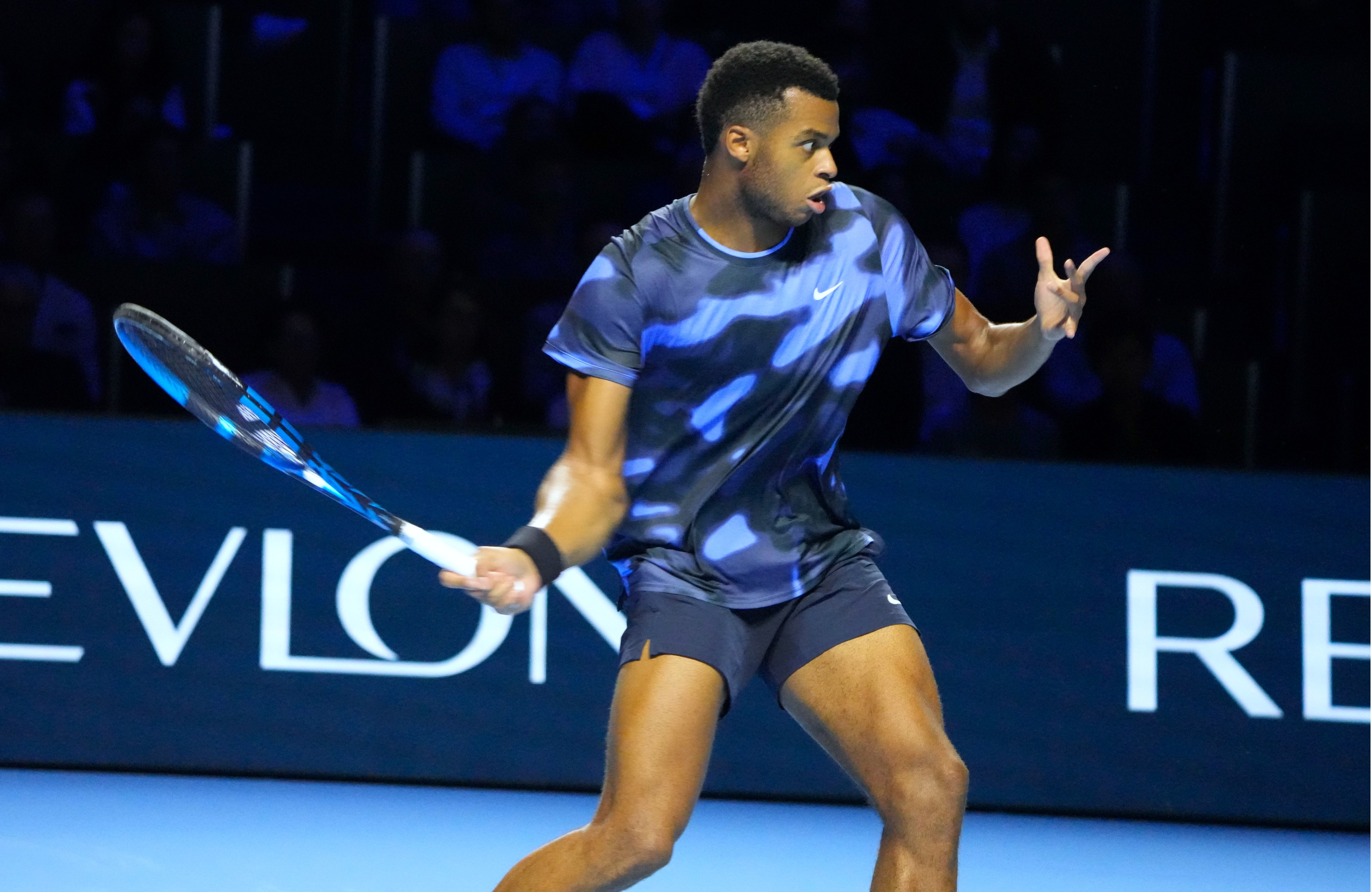
Giovanni Mpetshi Perricard, Champion Swiss Indoors Basel 2024 (photo: Peter Arnold)

The 2024 Swiss Indoors Basel was a men's tennis tournament played on indoor hard courts. It was the 53rd edition of the event, and part of the 500 series of the 2024 ATP Tour. It was held at the St. Jakobshalle in Basel, Switzerland, from 21 October until 27 October 2024.

== Finals ==
=== Singles ===
- (France) Giovanni Mpetshi Perricard def. (United States) Ben Shelton, 6–4, 7–6^{(7–4)}

=== Doubles ===
- (United Kingdom) Jamie Murray / (Australia) John Peers def. (Netherlands) Wesley Koolhof / (Croatia) Nikola Mektić, 6–3, 7–5

== Singles main draw entrants ==
=== Seeds ===
Country	Player	Rank^{1}	Seed
	Andrey Rublev	7	1
NOR	Casper Ruud	8	2
GRE	Stefanos Tsitsipas	11	3
DEN	Holger Rune	14	4
FRA	Ugo Humbert	16	5
USA	Ben Shelton	17	6
FRA	Arthur Fils	20	7
CAN	Félix Auger-Aliassime	21	8

- Rankings are as of 14 October 2024

=== Other entrants ===
The following players received wildcards into the singles main draw:

- (Canada) Denis Shapovalov
- (Switzerland) Dominic Stricker
- (Switzerland) Stan Wawrinka

The following player received entry using a protected ranking:

- (Croatia) Marin Čilić

The following player received entry as a special exempt:

- (Spain) Roberto Bautista Agut

The following players received entry from the qualifying draw:

- (Germany) Daniel Altmaier
- (Australia) James Duckworth
- (Switzerland) Jérôme Kym
- (Netherlands) Botic van de Zandschulp

The following player received entry as a lucky loser:

- (Belgium) David Goffin

=== Withdrawals ===
- (Spain) Roberto Carballés Baena → replaced by (Belgium) David Goffin
- (Poland) Hubert Hurkacz → replaced by (France) Giovanni Mpetshi Perricard
- (United States) Reilly Opelka → replaced by (China) Shang Juncheng

== Doubles main draw entrants ==
=== Seeds ===
Country	Player	Country	Player	Rank^{1}	Seed
NED	Wesley Koolhof	CRO	Nikola Mektić	27	1
MEX	Santiago González	FRA	Édouard Roger-Vasselin	42	2
USA	Austin Krajicek	USA	Rajeev Ram	44	3
MON	Hugo Nys	POL	Jan Zieliński	52	4

- ^{1} Rankings as of 14 October 2024

=== Other entrants ===
The following pairs received wildcards into the doubles main draw:

- (Switzerland) Henry Bernet / (Switzerland) Jérôme Kym
- (Switzerland) Marc-Andrea Hüsler / (Switzerland) Dominic Stricker

The following pair received entry from the qualifying draw:

- (United Kingdom) Jamie Murray / (Australia) John Peers

=== Withdrawals ===
- (Italy) Simone Bolelli / (Italy) Andrea Vavassori → replaced by (India) Yuki Bhambri / (France) Albano Olivetti
- (Germany) Kevin Krawietz / (Germany) Tim Pütz → replaced by (Germany) Kevin Krawietz / (Kazakhstan) Aleksandr Nedovyesov
- (Spain) Pedro Martínez / Andrey Rublev → replaced by (Netherlands) Tallon Griekspoor / (Spain) Pedro Martínez
