= 2010 Swiss Indoors – Singles =

Singles
- 2010 Swiss Indoors

Final
- Champion: (Switzerland) Roger Federer
- Runner-up: (Serbia) Novak Djokovic
- Score: 6–4, 3–6, 6–1

Details
- Draw: 32 (4 Q / 3 WC )
- Seeds: 8

Events
Singles	Doubles
← 2009 ·	Swiss Indoors	· 2011 →

Novak Djokovic was the defending champion, but lost to Roger Federer 6–4, 3–6, 6–1 in the final.

== Seeds ==
1. (Switzerland) Roger Federer (champion)
2. (Serbia) Novak Djokovic (final)
3. (Czech Republic) Tomáš Berdych (first round)
4. (United States) Andy Roddick (semifinals)
5. (Austria) Jürgen Melzer (withdrew due to fatigue)
6. (Croatia) Marin Čilić (second round)
7. (Croatia) Ivan Ljubičić (withdrew due to fatigue)
8. (United States) John Isner (second round)

== Draw ==
=== Key ===
- Q = Qualifier
- WC = Wild card
- LL = Lucky loser
- Alt = Alternate
- SE = Special exempt
- PR = Protected ranking
- ITF = ITF entry
- JE = Junior exempt
- w/o = Walkover
- r = Retired
- d = Defaulted
- SR = Special ranking

=== Finals ===
Semifinals
1	(Switzerland) Roger Federer	6	6
4	(United States) Andy Roddick	2	4
(Serbia) Viktor Troicki	6^{4}	4
2	(Serbia) Novak Djokovic	7^{7}	6

Final
1	(Switzerland) Roger Federer	6	3	6
2	(Serbia) Novak Djokovic	4	6	1

=== Top half ===
First round
1	(Switzerland) R Federer	6	5
(Ukraine) A Dolgopolov	4	2^{r}
(Serbia) J Tipsarević	6	6
(Uzbekistan) D Istomin	2	4
WC	(Czech Republic) R Štěpánek	6	7^{7}
(Netherlands) T de Bakker	3	6^{5}
(Colombia) S Giraldo	6	6
LL	(Slovakia) K Beck	2	1
4	(United States) A Roddick	7	7^{8}
(United States) S Querrey	5	6^{6}
(Belgium) X Malisse	5	2
(Kazakhstan) A Golubev	7	6
Q	(Czech Republic) J Hájek	3	4
(Argentina) D Nalbandian	6	6
WC	(Switzerland) M Chiudinelli	3	3
6	(Croatia) M Čilić	6	6

Second round
1	(Switzerland) R Federer	6	6
(Serbia) J Tipsarević	3	4
WC	(Czech Republic) R Štěpánek	3	6	6
(Colombia) S Giraldo	6	2	0
4	(United States) A Roddick	6	6
(Kazakhstan) A Golubev	3	4
(Argentina) D Nalbandian	4	6	6
6	(Croatia) M Čilić	6	4	4

Quarterfinals
1	(Switzerland) R Federer	6	6
WC	(Czech Republic) R Štěpánek	3	2
4	(United States) A Roddick	6	6
(Argentina) D Nalbandian	4	4

Semifinals
1	(Switzerland) R Federer	6	6
4	(United States) A Roddick	2	4

=== Bottom half ===
First round
LL	(France) P-H Mathieu	6	6
(Germany) F Mayer	3	3
(Serbia) V Troicki	6	6
(Germany) M Berrer	3	0
(Chinese Taipei) Y-h Lu	3	1
(France) R Gasquet	6	6
LL	(Germany) T Kamke	6	6
3	(Czech Republic) T Berdych	4	1
8	(United States) J Isner	4	7	6
(France) M Llodra	6	5	3
WC	(Switzerland) S Bohli	4	3
Q	(Netherlands) R Haase	6	6
Q	(Germany) D Brands	3	2
Q	(Finland) J Nieminen	6	6
(Latvia) E Gulbis	4	2
2	(Serbia) N Djokovic	6	6

Second round
LL	(France) P-H Mathieu
(Serbia) V Troicki	w/o
(France) R Gasquet	6	7
LL	(Germany) T Kamke	4	5
8	(United States) J Isner	2	7^{7}	5
Q	(Netherlands) R Haase	6	6^{5}	7
Q	(Finland) J Nieminen	4	6^{6}
2	(Serbia) N Djokovic	6	7^{8}

Quarterfinals
(Serbia) V Troicki	6	6
(France) R Gasquet	4	2
Q	(Netherlands) R Haase	2	3
2	(Serbia) N Djokovic	6	6

Semifinals
(Serbia) V Troicki	6^{4}	4
2	(Serbia) N Djokovic	7^{7}	6

== Qualifying ==
=== Seeds ===
1. (Finland) Jarkko Nieminen (qualified)
2. (Netherlands) Robin Haase (qualified)
3. (Germany) Tobias Kamke (qualifying competition, lucky loser)
4. (Germany) Daniel Brands (qualified)
5. (Slovakia) Lukáš Lacko (first round)
6. (Slovakia) Karol Beck (qualifying competition, lucky loser)
7. (Czech Republic) Jan Hájek (qualified)
8. (France) Paul-Henri Mathieu (qualifying competition, lucky loser)

=== Qualifiers ===
1. (Finland) Jarkko Nieminen
2. (Netherlands) Robin Haase
3. (Czech Republic) Jan Hájek
4. (Germany) Daniel Brands

=== Lucky losers ===
1. (Germany) Tobias Kamke
2. (Slovakia) Karol Beck
3. (France) Paul-Henri Mathieu

=== Draw ===
==== First qualifier ====
First round
1	(Finland) Jarkko Nieminen	6	6
WC	(Switzerland) Alexander Sadecky	4	2
(France) David Guez	6	6
5	(Slovakia) Lukáš Lacko	4	1

Qualifying competition
1	(Finland) Jarkko Nieminen	6	7
(France) David Guez	1	5

==== Second qualifier ====
First round
2	(Netherlands) Robin Haase	6	6
(Switzerland) Michael Lammer	2	3
WC	(Switzerland) Roman Valent	1	4
8	(France) Paul-Henri Mathieu	6	6

Qualifying competition
2	(Netherlands) Robin Haase	3	7^{7}	7^{9}
8	(France) Paul-Henri Mathieu	6	6^{3}	6^{7}

==== Third qualifier ====
First round
3	(Germany) Tobias Kamke	6	6
(Andorra) Laurent Recouderc	2	2
WC	(Switzerland) Adrien Bossel	2	5
7	(Czech Republic) Jan Hájek	6	7

Qualifying competition
3	(Germany) Tobias Kamke	6^{5}	5
7	(Czech Republic) Jan Hájek	7^{7}	7

==== Fourth qualifier ====
First round
4	(Germany) Daniel Brands	7	6
(Germany) Julian Reister	5	4
(France) Vincent Millot	1	2
6	(Slovakia) Karol Beck	6	6

Qualifying competition
4	(Germany) Daniel Brands	6	6
6	(Slovakia) Karol Beck	2	1
