= 2025 Swiss Indoors – Doubles =

Doubles
- 2025 Swiss Indoors

Final
- Champions: (Spain) Marcel Granollers (Argentina) Horacio Zeballos
- Runners-up: (Czech Republic) Adam Pavlásek (Poland) Jan Zieliński
- Score: 6–2, 7–5

Details
- Draw: 16
- Seeds: 4

Events
Singles	Doubles
← 2024 ·	Swiss Indoors	· 2026 →

Marcel Granollers and Horacio Zeballos defeated Adam Pavlásek and Jan Zieliński in the final, 6–2, 7–5, to win the doubles tennis title at the 2025 Swiss Indoors.

Jamie Murray and John Peers were the reigning champions, but chose not to compete this year.

== Seeds ==
1. (Spain) Marcel Granollers / (Argentina) Horacio Zeballos (champions)
2. (Italy) Simone Bolelli / (Italy) Andrea Vavassori (first round)
3. (United States) Christian Harrison / (United States) Evan King (first round)
4. (Monaco) Hugo Nys / (France) Édouard Roger-Vasselin (first round)

== Draw ==
=== Key ===
- Q = Qualifier
- WC = Wild card
- LL = Lucky loser
- Alt = Alternate
- ITF = ITF entry
- PR = Protected ranking
- SR = Special ranking
- SE = Special exempt
- JE = Junior exempt
- JR = Junior Accelerator Programme entrant
- CO = College Accelerator Programme entrant
- NG = Next Gen Accelerator Program entrant
- w/o = Walkover
- r = Retired
- d = Defaulted

=== Draw ===
First round
1	(Spain) M Granollers (Argentina) H Zeballos	6	7^{13}
(Monaco) R Arneodo (France) A Müller	3	6^{11}
(United States) A Krajicek (Croatia) N Mektić	6^{4}	6^{4}
WC	(Switzerland) M-A Hüsler (Switzerland) J Paul	7^{7}	7^{7}
3	(United States) C Harrison (United States) E King	6^{6}	7^{7}	[9]
Q	(Czech Republic) P Nouza (Czech Republic) P Rikl	7^{8}	6^{3}	[11]
(Mexico) S González (Netherlands) D Pel	3	6	[10]
PR	(United States) J Brooksby (Canada) G Diallo	6	3	[8]
WC	(France) P-H Herbert (France) N Mahut	6^{2}	7^{8}	[11]
(Brazil) J Fonseca (Brazil) R Matos	7^{7}	6^{6}	[9]
(India) R Bopanna (United States) B Shelton	7^{7}	6^{8}	[10]
4	(Monaco) H Nys (France) É Roger-Vasselin	6^{4}	7^{10}	[1]
(United States) R Cash (United States) JJ Tracy	4	4
(Netherlands) S Arends (United Kingdom) L Johnson	6	6
(Czech Republic) A Pavlásek (Poland) J Zieliński	6	6
2	(Italy) S Bolelli (Italy) A Vavassori	3	4

Quarterfinals
1	(Spain) M Granollers (Argentina) H Zeballos	6	7^{12}
WC	(Switzerland) M-A Hüsler (Switzerland) J Paul	4	6^{10}
Q	(Czech Republic) P Nouza (Czech Republic) P Rikl	7^{10}	7^{7}
(Mexico) S González (Netherlands) D Pel	6^{8}	6^{5}
WC	(France) P-H Herbert (France) N Mahut	3	6	[3]
(India) R Bopanna (United States) B Shelton	6	3	[10]
(Netherlands) S Arends (United Kingdom) L Johnson	4	1
(Czech Republic) A Pavlásek (Poland) J Zieliński	6	6

Semifinals
1	(Spain) M Granollers (Argentina) H Zeballos	6	6
Q	(Czech Republic) P Nouza (Czech Republic) P Rikl	1	4
(India) R Bopanna (United States) B Shelton	6^{2}	5
(Czech Republic) A Pavlásek (Poland) J Zieliński	7^{7}	7

Final
1	(Spain) M Granollers (Argentina) H Zeballos	6	7
(Czech Republic) A Pavlásek (Poland) J Zieliński	2	5

== Qualifying ==
=== Seeds ===
1. (Czech Republic) Petr Nouza / (Czech Republic) Patrik Rikl (qualified)
2. (France) Grégoire Jacq / (United Kingdom) Marcus Willis (first round)

=== Qualifiers ===
1. (Czech Republic) Petr Nouza / (Czech Republic) Patrik Rikl

=== Qualifying draw ===
First round				Qualifying competition
				1	(Czech Republic) Petr Nouza (Czech Republic) Patrik Rikl	5	6	[11]
				WC	(Switzerland) Rémy Bertola (Switzerland) Mika Brunold	7	4	[9]
WC	(Switzerland) Rémy Bertola (Switzerland) Mika Brunold	7	7^{7}	WC	(Switzerland) Rémy Bertola (Switzerland) Mika Brunold	7	4	[9]
2/Alt	(France) Grégoire Jacq (United Kingdom) Marcus Willis	5	6^{5}
