= 2024 Swiss Indoors – Singles =

Singles
- 2024 Swiss Indoors

Final
- Champion: (France) Giovanni Mpetshi Perricard
- Runner-up: (United States) Ben Shelton
- Score: 6–4, 7–6^{(7–4)}

Details
- Draw: 32 (4 Q / 3 WC )
- Seeds: 8

Events
Singles	Doubles
← 2023 ·	Swiss Indoors	· 2025 →

Giovanni Mpetshi Perricard defeated Ben Shelton in the final, 6–4, 7–6^{(7–4)} to win the singles title at the 2024 Swiss Indoors. It was his second ATP Tour title and first at the ATP 500 level. Mpetshi Perricard became the lowest-ranked champion since the tournament became a tour-level event in 1975 and the first unseeded player to win the tournament since Jiří Novák in 2004.

Félix Auger-Aliassime was the two-time defending champion, but lost to eventual champion Mpetshi Perricard in the second round.

== Seeds ==
1. Andrey Rublev (quarterfinals)
2. (Norway) Casper Ruud (first round)
3. (Greece) Stefanos Tsitsipas (quarterfinals)
4. (Denmark) Holger Rune (semifinals)
5. (France) Ugo Humbert (second round)
6. (United States) Ben Shelton (final)
7. (France) Arthur Fils (semifinals)
8. (Canada) Félix Auger-Aliassime (second round)

== Draw ==
=== Key ===
- Q = Qualifier
- WC = Wild card
- LL = Lucky loser
- Alt = Alternate
- ITF = ITF entry
- PR = Protected ranking
- SR = Special ranking
- SE = Special exempt
- JE = Junior exempt
- JR = Junior Accelerator Programme entrant
- CO = College Accelerator Programme entrant
- NG = Next Gen Accelerator Program entrant
- w/o = Walkover
- r = Retired
- d = Defaulted

=== Finals ===
Semifinals
6	(United States) Ben Shelton	6	7^{11}
7	(France) Arthur Fils	3	6^{9}
4	(Denmark) Holger Rune	6^{6}	4
(France) Giovanni Mpetshi Perricard	7^{8}	6

Final
6	(United States) Ben Shelton	4	6^{4}
(France) Giovanni Mpetshi Perricard	6	7^{7}

=== Top half ===
First round
1	A Rublev	6	6
(Portugal) N Borges	3	2
PR	(Croatia) M Čilić	6^{4}	6^{2}
(Chile) A Tabilo	7^{7}	7^{7}
(France) A Mannarino	3	6	5
WC	(Switzerland) S Wawrinka	6	3	7
(Argentina) TM Etcheverry	3	4
6	(United States) B Shelton	6	6
3	(Greece) S Tsitsipas	6	6^{3}	7^{7}
(Argentina) F Cerúndolo	3	7^{7}	6^{4}
Q	(Netherlands) B van de Zandschulp	3	6	4
(Kazakhstan) A Bublik	6	4	0^{r}
(Spain) P Martínez	6	6
(Czech Republic) J Lehečka	2	2
Q	(Germany) D Altmaier	6^{5}	3
7	(France) A Fils	7^{7}	6

Second round
1	A Rublev	7^{7}	6
(Chile) A Tabilo	6^{3}	1
WC	(Switzerland) S Wawrinka	6^{2}	5
6	(United States) B Shelton	7^{7}	7
3	(Greece) S Tsitsipas	7^{7}	7
Q	(Netherlands) B van de Zandschulp	6^{3}	5
(Spain) P Martínez	5	3
7	(France) A Fils	7	6

Quarterfinals
1	A Rublev	5	7^{7}	4
6	(United States) B Shelton	7	6^{3}	6
3	(Greece) S Tsitsipas	6^{5}	3
7	(France) A Fils	7^{7}	6

Semifinals
6	(United States) B Shelton	6	7^{11}
7	(France) A Fils	3	6^{9}

=== Bottom half ===
First round
5	(France) U Humbert	6	6^{5}	7
Q	(Switzerland) J Kym	4	7^{7}	5
LL	(Belgium) D Goffin	6^{5}	6	6
(Italy) M Arnaldi	7^{7}	3	2
WC	(Switzerland) D Stricker	6	6
(Netherlands) T Griekspoor	4	4
(Chile) N Jarry	4	6^{3}
4	(Denmark) H Rune	6	7^{7}
8	(Canada) F Auger-Aliassime	7	6
(Argentina) S Báez	5	1
Q	(Australia) J Duckworth	6^{4}	3
(France) G Mpetshi Perricard	7^{7}	6
WC	(Canada) D Shapovalov	6	6
(China) J Shang	1	4
SE	(Spain) R Bautista Agut	6	3	6
2	(Norway) C Ruud	3	6	3

Second round
5	(France) U Humbert	6	1	6^{7}
LL	(Belgium) D Goffin	3	6	7^{9}
WC	(Switzerland) D Stricker	3	6^{2}
4	(Denmark) H Rune	6	7^{7}
8	(Canada) F Auger-Aliassime	1	6^{6}
(France) G Mpetshi Perricard	6	7^{8}
WC	(Canada) D Shapovalov	6	7^{7}
SE	(Spain) R Bautista Agut	3	6^{4}

Quarterfinals
LL	(Belgium) D Goffin	2	4
4	(Denmark) H Rune	6	6
(France) G Mpetshi Perricard	6^{7}	6	7^{7}
WC	(Canada) D Shapovalov	7^{9}	3	6^{3}

Semifinals
4	(Denmark) H Rune	6^{6}	4
(France) G Mpetshi Perricard	7^{8}	6

== Qualifying ==
=== Seeds ===
1. (Belgium) David Goffin (qualifying competition, lucky loser)
2. (Serbia) Miomir Kecmanović (entered main draw in Vienna)
3. (France) Arthur Rinderknech (first round)
4. (Australia) James Duckworth (qualified)
5. (Argentina) Facundo Díaz Acosta (first round)
6. (Netherlands) Botic van de Zandschulp (qualified)
7. (Australia) Christopher O'Connell (first round)
8. (Italy) Fabio Fognini (first round)

=== Qualifiers ===
1. (Netherlands) Botic van de Zandschulp
2. (Germany) Daniel Altmaier
3. (Switzerland) Jérôme Kym
4. (Australia) James Duckworth

=== Lucky loser ===
1. (Belgium) David Goffin

=== Qualifying draw ===
==== First qualifier ====
First round
1	(Belgium) David Goffin	6^{2}	6	6
(Germany) Yannick Hanfmann	7^{7}	1	4
(Brazil) Thiago Monteiro	7^{7}	4	4
6	(Netherlands) Botic van de Zandschulp	6^{5}	6	6

Qualifying competition
1	(Belgium) David Goffin	2	4
6	(Netherlands) Botic van de Zandschulp	6	6

==== Second qualifier ====
First round
Alt	(Netherlands) Jesper de Jong	4	6^{3}
(Germany) Daniel Altmaier	6	7^{7}
(United Kingdom) Jacob Fearnley	6	1	6
7	(Australia) Christopher O'Connell	4	6	4

Qualifying competition
(Germany) Daniel Altmaier	6	3	7^{7}
(United Kingdom) Jacob Fearnley	3	6	6^{5}

==== Third qualifier ====
First round
3	(France) Arthur Rinderknech	1	6^{3}
WC	(Switzerland) Jérôme Kym	6	7^{7}
WC	(Switzerland) Henry Bernet	6	7^{7}
8	(Italy) Fabio Fognini	3	6^{4}

Qualifying competition
WC	(Switzerland) Jérôme Kym	6	6
WC	(Switzerland) Henry Bernet	2	4

==== Fourth qualifier ====
First round
4	(Australia) James Duckworth	6	7^{7}
WC	(Switzerland) Mika Brunold	3	6^{4}
(India) Sumit Nagal	5	7^{7}	7^{7}
5	(Argentina) Facundo Díaz Acosta	7	6^{3}	6^{5}

Qualifying competition
4	(Australia) James Duckworth	6	7^{7}
(India) Sumit Nagal	4	6^{2}
