= 2009 Davidoff Swiss Indoors – Doubles =

Doubles
- 2009 Davidoff Swiss Indoors

Final
- Champions: (Canada) Daniel Nestor (Serbia) Nenad Zimonjić
- Runners-up: (United States) Bob Bryan (United States) Mike Bryan
- Score: 6–2, 6–3

Details
- Draw: 16
- Seeds: 4

Events
Singles	Doubles
← 2008 ·	Swiss Indoors	· 2010 →

Mahesh Bhupathi and Mark Knowles were the defending champions, but chose not to participate that year.
Daniel Nestor and Nenad Zimonjić won in the final 6–2, 6–3, against Bob and Mike Bryan.

== Seeds ==
1. (Canada) Daniel Nestor / (Serbia) Nenad Zimonjić (champions)
2. (United States) Bob Bryan / (United States) Mike Bryan (final)
3. (Brazil) Bruno Soares / (Zimbabwe) Kevin Ullyett (first round)
4. (Sweden) Simon Aspelin / (Australia) Paul Hanley (first round)

== Draw ==
=== Key ===
- Q = Qualifier
- WC = Wild card
- LL = Lucky loser
- Alt = Alternate
- SE = Special exempt
- PR = Protected ranking
- ITF = ITF entry
- JE = Junior exempt
- w/o = Walkover
- r = Retired
- d = Defaulted
- SR = Special ranking

=== Draw ===
First round
1	(Canada) D Nestor (Serbia) N Zimonjić	4	6	[10]
(Argentina) L Arnold Ker (Chile) F González	6	3	[5]
WC	(Switzerland) M Chiudinelli (Switzerland) R Federer	4	3
(United States) J Cerretani (Pakistan) A-u-H Qureshi	6	6
3	(Brazil) B Soares (Zimbabwe) K Ullyett	6^{4}	6	[6]
(Germany) C Kas (Serbia) V Troicki	7^{7}	4	[10]
(United States) S Lipsky (Slovakia) F Polášek	6	6
(Czech Republic) J Levinský (United States) T Parrott	3	4
(Israel) J Erlich (Israel) A Ram	2	6	[9]
(Czech Republic) L Dlouhý (Germany) P Kohlschreiber	6	3	[11]
(Brazil) A Sá (Serbia) N Djokovic	7	6
4	(Sweden) S Aspelin (Australia) P Hanley	5	3
(Germany) A Beck (Germany) B Becker	6	6^{4}	[6]
(Sweden) J Brunström (Netherlands Antilles) J-J Rojer	4	7^{7}	[10]
WC	(Switzerland) Y Allegro (Croatia) I Ljubičić	1	4
2	(United States) B Bryan (United States) M Bryan	6	6

Quarterfinals
1	(Canada) D Nestor (Serbia) N Zimonjić	6	6
(United States) J Cerretani (Pakistan) A-u-H Qureshi	4	4
(Germany) C Kas (Serbia) V Troicki	6	6
(United States) S Lipsky (Slovakia) F Polášek	4	2
(Czech Republic) L Dlouhý (Germany) P Kohlschreiber	3	4
(Brazil) A Sá (Serbia) N Djokovic	6	6
(Sweden) J Brunström (Netherlands Antilles) J-J Rojer	6^{3}	6^{5}
2	(United States) B Bryan (United States) M Bryan	7^{7}	7^{7}

Semifinals
1	(Canada) D Nestor (Serbia) N Zimonjić	6	7^{7}
(Germany) C Kas (Serbia) V Troicki	1	6^{1}
(Brazil) A Sá (Serbia) N Djokovic	6	0	[7]
2	(United States) B Bryan (United States) M Bryan	4	6	[10]

Final
1	(Canada) D Nestor (Serbia) N Zimonjić	6	6
2	(United States) B Bryan (United States) M Bryan	2	3
