= 2010 Swiss Indoors – Doubles =

Doubles
- 2010 Swiss Indoors

Final
- Champions: (United States) Bob Bryan (United States) Mike Bryan
- Runners-up: (Canada) Daniel Nestor (Serbia) Nenad Zimonjić
- Score: 6–3, 3–6, [10–3]

Details
- Draw: 16
- Seeds: 4

Events
Singles	Doubles
← 2009 ·	Swiss Indoors	· 2011 →

Daniel Nestor and Nenad Zimonjić were the defending champions, but lost to Bob Bryan and Mike Bryan in the final match.

== Seeds ==
1. (United States) Bob Bryan / (United States) Mike Bryan (champions)
2. (Canada) Daniel Nestor / (Serbia) Nenad Zimonjić (final)
3. (Sweden) Robert Lindstedt / (Romania) Horia Tecău (first round)
4. (Sweden) Simon Aspelin / (Australia) Paul Hanley (first round)

== Draw ==
=== Key ===
- Q = Qualifier
- WC = Wild card
- LL = Lucky loser
- Alt = Alternate
- SE = Special exempt
- PR = Protected ranking
- ITF = ITF entry
- JE = Junior exempt
- w/o = Walkover
- r = Retired
- d = Defaulted
- SR = Special ranking

=== Draw ===
First round
1	(United States) B Bryan (United States) M Bryan	6	6
ALT	(Slovakia) K Beck (Czech Republic) J Hájek	2	2
(Germany) M Kohlmann (Finland) J Nieminen	6	4	[5]
(United States) J Isner (United States) S Querrey	2	6	[10]
4	(Sweden) S Aspelin (Australia) P Hanley	4	6	[6]
(Czech Republic) L Dlouhý (Czech Republic) R Štěpánek	6	2	[10]
(Austria) J Knowle (Israel) A Ram	3	3
(Chinese Taipei) Y-h Lu (Serbia) J Tipsarević	6	6
(Germany) M Berrer (Latvia) E Gulbis	6	6^{2}	[10]
WC	(Switzerland) S Bohli (Switzerland) M Lammer	4	7^{7}	[7]
(United States) E Butorac (Curaçao) J-J Rojer	7^{8}	6
3	(Sweden) R Lindstedt (Romania) H Tecău	6^{6}	4
(Kazakhstan) A Golubev (Uzbekistan) D Istomin	4	6	[10]
(Switzerland) Y Allegro (Switzerland) M Chiudinelli	6	4	[4]
(Croatia) M Čilić (Germany) C Kas	1	4
2	(Canada) D Nestor (Serbia) N Zimonjić	6	6

Quarterfinals
1	(United States) B Bryan (United States) M Bryan	6	6^{7}	[10]
(United States) J Isner (United States) S Querrey	0	7^{9}	[7]
(Czech Republic) L Dlouhý (Czech Republic) R Štěpánek	7	4	[7]
(Chinese Taipei) Y-h Lu (Serbia) J Tipsarević	5	6	[10]
(Germany) M Berrer (Latvia) E Gulbis	2	6^{3}
(United States) E Butorac (Curaçao) J-J Rojer	6	7^{7}
(Kazakhstan) A Golubev (Uzbekistan) D Istomin	3	2
2	(Canada) D Nestor (Serbia) N Zimonjić	6	6

Semifinals
1	(United States) B Bryan (United States) M Bryan	6	6
(Chinese Taipei) Y-h Lu (Serbia) J Tipsarević	1	2
(United States) E Butorac (Curaçao) J-J Rojer	6	5	[7]
2	(Canada) D Nestor (Serbia) N Zimonjić	3	7	[10]

Final
1	(United States) B Bryan (United States) M Bryan	6	3	[10]
2	(Canada) D Nestor (Serbia) N Zimonjić	3	6	[3]
