= 2024 Swiss Indoors – Doubles =

Doubles
- 2024 Swiss Indoors

Final
- Champions: (United Kingdom) Jamie Murray (Australia) John Peers
- Runners-up: (Netherlands) Wesley Koolhof (Croatia) Nikola Mektić
- Score: 6–3, 7–5

Details
- Draw: 16
- Seeds: 4

Events
Singles	Doubles
← 2023 ·	Swiss Indoors	· 2025 →

Jamie Murray and John Peers defeated Wesley Koolhof and Nikola Mektić in the final, 6–3, 7–5 to win the doubles tennis title at the 2024 Swiss Indoors.

Santiago González and Édouard Roger-Vasselin were the defending champions, but lost in the semifinals to Murray and Peers.

== Seeds ==
1. (Netherlands) Wesley Koolhof / (Croatia) Nikola Mektić (final)
2. (Mexico) Santiago González / (France) Édouard Roger-Vasselin (semifinals)
3. (United States) Austin Krajicek / (United States) Rajeev Ram (first round)
4. (Monaco) Hugo Nys / (Poland) Jan Zieliński (first round)

== Draw ==
=== Key ===
- Q = Qualifier
- WC = Wild card
- LL = Lucky loser
- Alt = Alternate
- ITF = ITF entry
- PR = Protected ranking
- SR = Special ranking
- SE = Special exempt
- JE = Junior exempt
- JR = Junior Accelerator Programme entrant
- CO = College Accelerator Programme entrant
- NG = Next Gen Accelerator Program entrant
- w/o = Walkover
- r = Retired
- d = Defaulted

=== Draw ===
First round
1	(Netherlands) W Koolhof (Croatia) N Mektić	6	6^{9}	[10]
(Argentina) F Cerúndolo (Argentina) TM Etcheverry	4	7^{11}	[7]
(Croatia) I Dodig (Czech Republic) A Pavlásek	6	6^{8}	[11]
(Germany) K Krawietz (Kazakhstan) A Nedovyesov	1	7^{10}	[13]
4	(Monaco) H Nys (Poland) J Zieliński	6^{4}	1
WC	(Switzerland) M-A Hüsler (Switzerland) D Stricker	7^{7}	6
(France) A Fils (United States) B Shelton	6	6
(Netherlands) T Griekspoor (Spain) P Martínez	3	2
(India) Y Bhambri (France) A Olivetti	3	7	[10]
(Netherlands) J-J Rojer (United Kingdom) J Salisbury	6	5	[8]
Q	(United Kingdom) J Murray (Australia) J Peers	6	6^{6}	[10]
3	(United States) A Krajicek (United States) R Ram	3	7^{8}	[7]
WC	(Switzerland) H Bernet (Switzerland) J Kym	2	7^{7}	[10]
(Chile) A Tabilo (Chile) N Jarry	6	6^{4}	[3]
(Argentina) S Báez (Kazakhstan) A Bublik	3	4
2	(Mexico) S González (France) É Roger-Vasselin	6	6

Quarterfinals
1	(Netherlands) W Koolhof (Croatia) N Mektić	6	7^{7}
(Germany) K Krawietz (Kazakhstan) A Nedovyesov	4	6^{5}
WC	(Switzerland) M-A Hüsler (Switzerland) D Stricker	6	6
(France) A Fils (United States) B Shelton	3	3
(India) Y Bhambri (France) A Olivetti	6	5	[6]
Q	(United Kingdom) J Murray (Australia) J Peers	4	7	[10]
WC	(Switzerland) H Bernet (Switzerland) J Kym	4	3
2	(Mexico) S González (France) É Roger-Vasselin	6	6

Semifinals
1	(Netherlands) W Koolhof (Croatia) N Mektić	6	6^{1}	[10]
WC	(Switzerland) M-A Hüsler (Switzerland) D Stricker	4	7^{7}	[6]
Q	(United Kingdom) J Murray (Australia) J Peers	4	7^{7}	[10]
2	(Mexico) S González (France) É Roger-Vasselin	6	6^{5}	[5]

Final
1	(Netherlands) W Koolhof (Croatia) N Mektić	3	5
Q	(United Kingdom) J Murray (Australia) J Peers	6	7

== Qualifying ==
=== Seeds ===
1. (United Kingdom) Jamie Murray / (Australia) John Peers (qualified)
2. (Germany) Constantin Frantzen / (Germany) Hendrik Jebens (qualifying competition)

=== Qualifiers ===
1. (United Kingdom) Jamie Murray / (Australia) John Peers

=== Qualifying draw ===
First round
1	(United Kingdom) Jamie Murray (Australia) John Peers	6	6^{5}	[16]
(Monaco) Romain Arneodo (France) Théo Arribagé	2	7^{7}	[14]
WC	(Switzerland) Mika Brunold (Switzerland) Jonas Schär	2	0
2	(Germany) Constantin Frantzen (Germany) Hendrik Jebens	6	6

Qualifying competition
1	(United Kingdom) Jamie Murray (Australia) John Peers	4	6	[10]
2	(Germany) Constantin Frantzen (Germany) Hendrik Jebens	6	2	[8]
