= 2009 Davidoff Swiss Indoors =

- Date: 2–8 November
- Edition: 40th
- Category: ATP World Tour 500
- Draw: 32S/16D
- Surface: Hard / indoors
- Location: Basel, Switzerland
- Venue: St. Jakobshalle

Champions

Singles
- (Serbia) Novak Djokovic

Doubles
- (Canada) Daniel Nestor / (Serbia) Nenad Zimonjić
← 2008 ·	Swiss Indoors	· 2010 →

The 2009 Davidoff Swiss Indoors was a men's tennis tournament played on indoor hard courts. It was the 40th edition of the event known that year as the Davidoff Swiss Indoors, and was part of the 500 Series of the 2009 ATP World Tour. It was held at the St. Jakobshalle in Basel, Switzerland, from 2 November through 8 November 2009. Second-seeded Novak Djokovic won the singles title.

== Finals ==
=== Singles ===
(Serbia) Novak Djokovic defeated (Switzerland) Roger Federer, 6–4, 4–6, 6–2

- It was Djokovic's 4th title of the year and 15th of his career.

=== Doubles ===
(Canada) Daniel Nestor / (Serbia) Nenad Zimonjić defeated (United States) Bob Bryan / (United States) Mike Bryan, 6–2, 6–3

== ATP entrants ==
=== Seeds ===
Country	Player	Rank^{1}	Seed
SUI	Roger Federer	1	1
SRB	Novak Djokovic	3	2
CHI	Fernando González	11	3
CRO	Marin Čilić	13	4
CZE	Radek Štěpánek	14	5
SUI	Stanislas Wawrinka	21	6
USA	James Blake	23	7
GER	Philipp Kohlschreiber	24	8

- Seeds are based on the rankings of October 26, 2009.

=== Other entrants ===
The following players received wildcards into the singles main draw:

- (Switzerland) Stéphane Bohli
- (Switzerland) Marco Chiudinelli
- (Croatia) Marin Čilić

The following players received entry from the qualifying draw:

- (Russia) Evgeny Korolev
- (Switzerland) Michael Lammer
- (Australia) Peter Luczak
- (Belgium) Olivier Rochus

The following player received the lucky loser spot:

- (France) Florent Serra
