= Henry Bernet =

Swiss tennis player (born 2007)

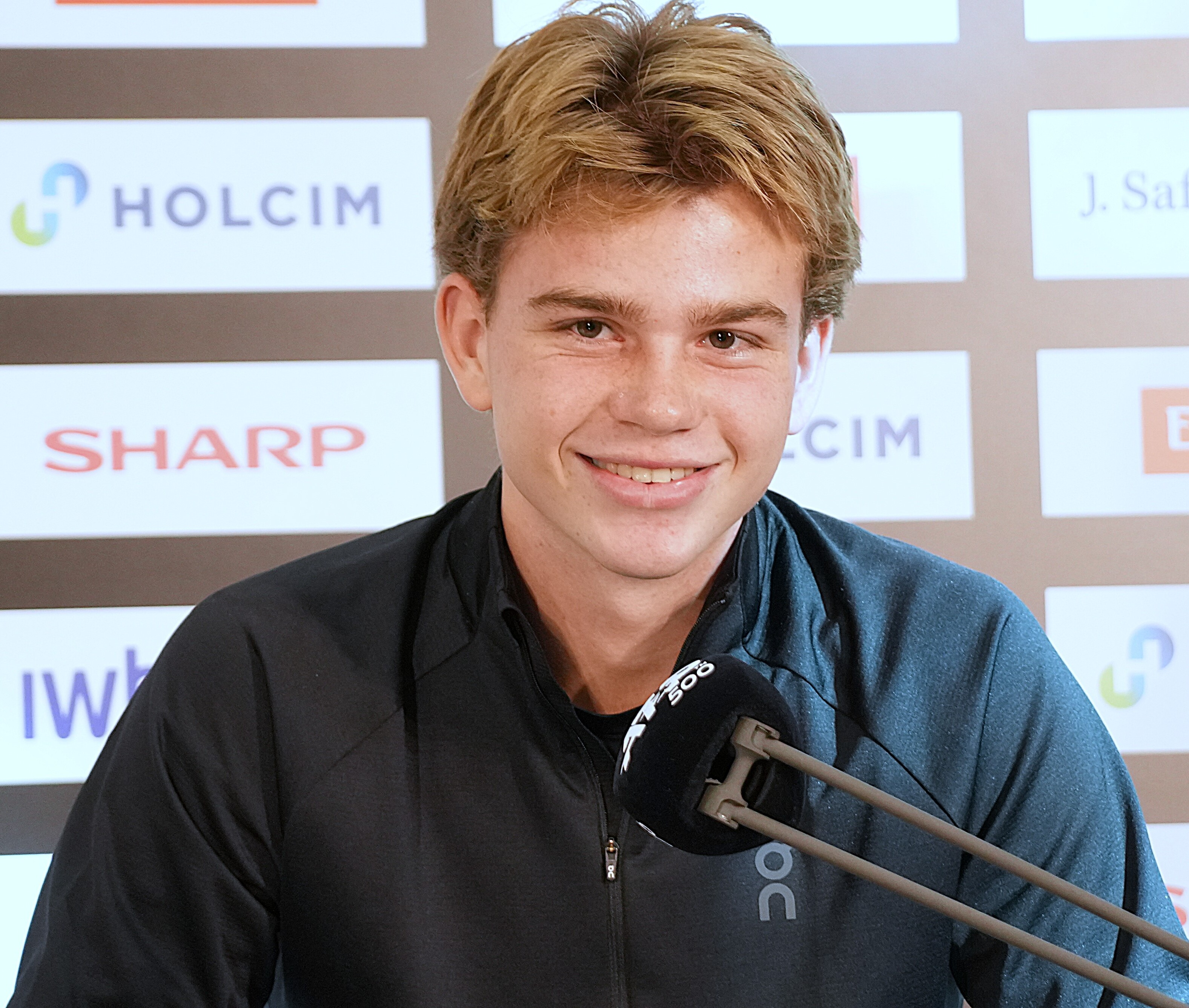
- Bernet at the 2025 Swiss Indoors
- Country (sports): Switzerland
- Born: 25 January 2007 (age 19) Basel, Switzerland
- Height: 1.91 m (6 ft 3 in)
- Plays: Right-handed (one-handed backhand)
- Coach: Sven Swinnen
- Prize money: US $203,389

Singles
- Career record: 0–2 (at ATP Tour level, Grand Slam level, and in Davis Cup)
- Career titles: 0
- Highest ranking: No. 361 (26 October 2026)
- Current ranking: No. 366 (2 November 2026)

Grand Slam singles results
- Australian Open: Q1 (2026)

Doubles
- Career record: 4–3 (at ATP Tour level, Grand Slam level, and in Davis Cup)
- Career titles: 0
- Highest ranking: No. 227 (2 November 2026)
- Current ranking: No. 227 (2 November 2026)

Team competitions
- Davis Cup: 0–1
- Last updated on: 2 November 2026.

Henry Bernet (born 25 January 2007) is a Swiss professional tennis player. He has a career-high ATP singles ranking of No. 361 achieved on 26 October 2026 and a doubles ranking of No. 227 reached on 2 November 2026.

Bernet won the boys' singles title at the 2025 Australian Open. He represents Switzerland at the Davis Cup, where he has a W/L record of 0–1.

== Early life ==
Bernet was born in Basel to father Robert and mother Michèle. He has a brother, Louis, and a sister, Amy. He began playing tennis at the age of four, introduced to the sport by his brother. He also played youth football with BSC Old Boys and FC Basel. In tennis, he represented TC Old Boys, of which his aunt, Marianne Bernet, is the club president. In 2022, he moved to Biel to train at the Swiss Tennis National Tennis Center under coach Kai Stentenbach.

== Junior career ==
Bernet had successful results on the ITF junior circuit, maintaining a 106–38 singles win-loss record. In May 2022, he won the J5 event in Jönköping, Sweden after defeating top seed Saba George Nanobashvili in the final. In July, he was selected to represent Switzerland at the 2022 European Youth Summer Olympic Festival. Later that year, he won the J4 event in Rhodes, Greece and both the singles and doubles titles at the J5 event in Leimen, Germany.

In January 2023, Bernet won the J100 Salk Open in Bromma, defeating top seed Albert Saar in the final. In May, he and partner Tymur Bieldiugin won the doubles title at the J200 Panaceo ITF Junior Cup in Villach, Austria. In August, he reached the final of the J200 Baublies Jugend Cup in Renningen-Rutesheim, but lost to wildcard Tom Sickenberger. The following month, he reached the semifinals of the U16 Tennis European Junior Championships in singles and won the doubles title with compatriot Flynn Thomas.

In January 2024, he reached the final of the J200 Slovak Junior Indoor event in Bratislava, but lost to top seed Denis Peták. In April, he reached the final of the J300 Tournoi de Tennis ITF Junior in Beaulieu-sur-Mer, France but lost to Nicolai Budkov Kjær. The following month, he made his major jr. debut after qualifying for the French Open. In singles, he upset third seed Budkov Kjær in the first round and reached the quarterfinals, where he lost to eventual champion Kaylan Bigun.

In January 2025, Bernet won the J300 Traralgon International without dropping a set. He had his best result at junior-level later that month, when he lifted the boys' singles trophy at the Australian Open, having only dropped one set in his title run. He was the first Swiss player to win a junior singles title at the Australian Open and the sixth Swiss player to win a junior singles title at any major.

He reached an ITF junior combined ranking of world No. 1 on 26 May 2025.

== Professional career ==
In August 2023, Bernet qualified for his first professional tournament at the M25 Muttenz Open, where he reached the second round.

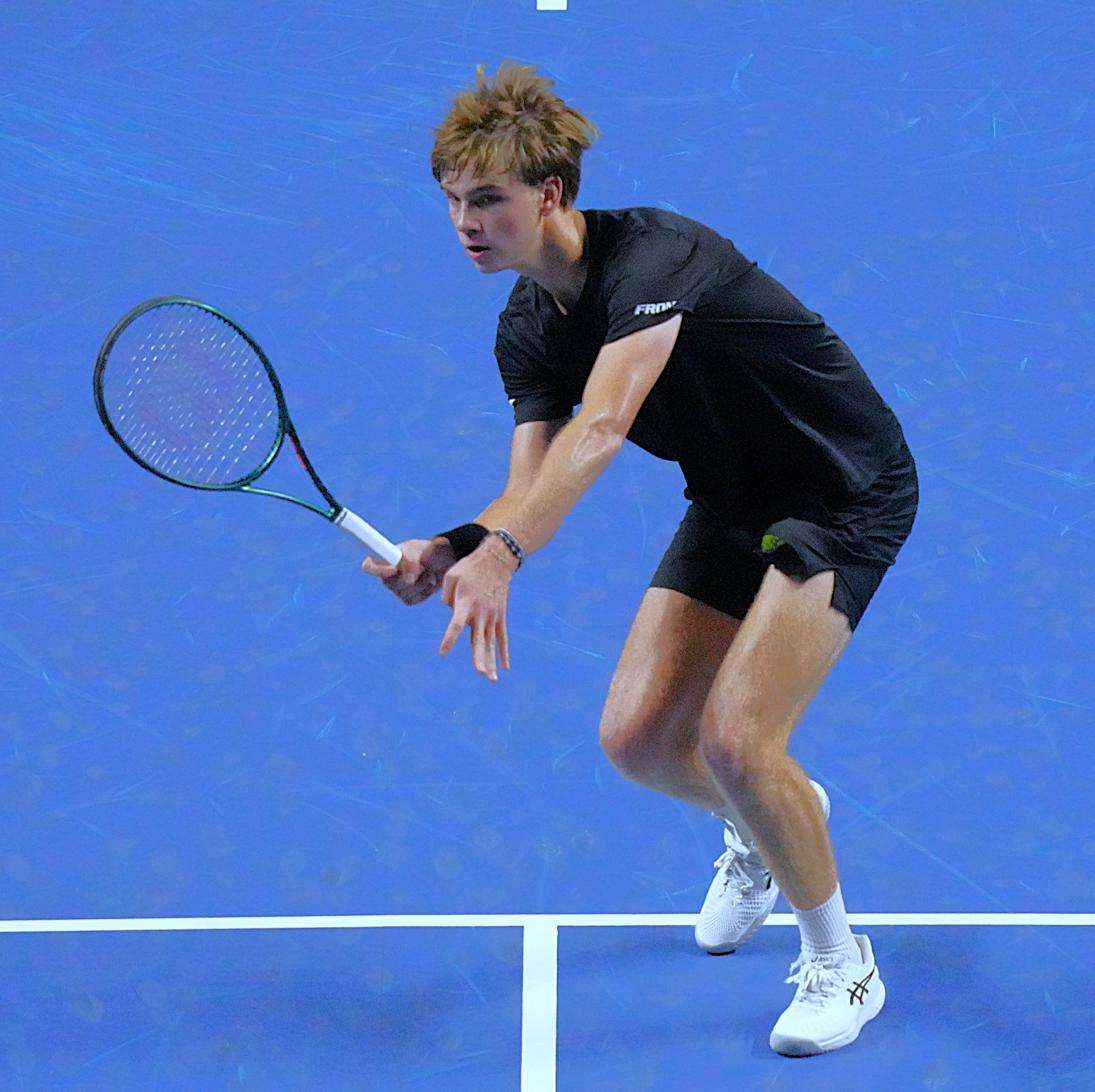
Bernet at the 2024 Swiss Indoors

In July 2024, he made his ATP Challenger Tour debut with a wildcard into the main draw of the Zug Open. He upset Juan Pablo Varillas the second round, making him the first player born in 2007 or later to reach the quarterfinals of a Challenger tournament. Later that year, he made his ATP Tour doubles debut as a wildcard into the doubles main draw of the Swiss Indoors with compatriot Jérôme Kym. They defeated Alejandro Tabilo and Nicolás Jarry in the first round. In singles, he reached the second round of the qualifying competition as a wildcard with a win over Fabio Fognini, but lost to Kym in the second round.

In early 2025, Bernet ended his coaching relationship with Kai Stentenbach and hired Sven Swinnen as his coach. Severin Lüthi also works with him in an advisory capacity. Later that year, ranked No. 481, he made his ATP Tour singles debut with a wildcard into the main draw of the Swiss Indoors in Basel, but lost in the first round to Jakub Menšík.

=== 2026: First major qualifying ===
In January 2026, Bernet received a wildcard into the qualifying competition of the Australian Open, but lost in the first round to Pablo Llamas Ruiz.

== Endorsements ==
In January 2025, Bernet signed a five-year deal with On, becoming the first active Swiss tennis player to sign with the brand. He is sponsored by Wilson for racquets.

== Personal life ==
Being a Swiss player from Basel who employs a one-handed backhand and represented TC Old Boys, Bernet has often drawn comparisons to Roger Federer.

== Performance timeline ==
Key
W	F	SF	QF	#R	RR	Q#	DNQ	A	NH

(W) winner; (F) finalist; (SF) semifinalist; (QF) quarterfinalist; (#R) rounds 4, 3, 2, 1; (RR) round-robin stage; (Q#) qualification round; (DNQ) did not qualify; (A) absent; (NH) not held; (SR) strike rate (events won / competed); (W–L) win–loss record.
To avoid confusion and double counting, these charts are updated at the conclusion of a tournament or when the player's participation has ended.

=== Singles ===
Current through the 2026 Swiss Indoors.

Tournament	2026	SR	W–L	Win %
Grand Slam tournaments
Australian Open	Q1	0 / 0	0–0	–
French Open	A	0 / 0	0–0	–
Wimbledon	A	0 / 0	0–0	–
US Open	A	0 / 0	0–0	–
Win–loss	0–0	0 / 0	0–0	–
ATP Masters 1000
Indian Wells Masters	A	0 / 0	0–0	–
Miami Open	A	0 / 0	0–0	–
Monte Carlo Masters	A	0 / 0	0–0	–
Madrid Open	A	0 / 0	0-0	–
Italian Open	A	0 / 0	0–0	–
Canadian Open	A	0 / 0	0–0	–
Cincinnati Masters	A	0 / 0	0–0	–
Shanghai Masters	A	0 / 0	0–0	–
Paris Masters	A	0 / 0	0–0	–
Win–loss	0–0	0 / 0	0–0	–

== ATP Tour Finals ==
=== Doubles: 1 (runner-up) ===
Legend ATP 500 (0–1)	Finals by surface Hard (0–1)	Finals by setting Indoor (0–1)

Result	W–L	Date	Tournament	Tier	Surface	Partner	Opponents	Score
Loss	0–1	Oct 2026	Swiss Indoors, Switzerland	ATP 500	Hard (i)	(Switzerland) Dominic Stricker	(France) Théo Arribagé (France) Albano Olivetti	6–7^{(6–8)}, 6–7^{(6–8)}

== ITF World Tennis Tour finals ==
=== Singles: 4 (4 titles) ===
Legend ITF World Tennis (4–0)	Finals by surface Hard (1–0) Clay (3–0)

Result	W–L	Date	Tournament	Surface	Opponent	Score
Win	1–0	Aug 2025	M25 Muttenz, Switzerland	Clay	(Switzerland) Jeffrey von der Schulenburg	7–5, 6–4
Win	2–0	Sep 2025	M25 Lausanne, Switzerland	Clay	(Germany) Lucas Gerch	6–4, 6–4
Win	3–0	Aug 2026	M25 Lausanne, Switzerland (2)	Clay	Andrey Chepelev	6–4, 6–2
Win	4–0	Sep 2026	M25 Falun, Sweden	Hard	(United States) Samir Banerjee	7–6^{(7–3)}, 6-4

== Junior Grand Slam finals ==
=== Singles: 1 (title) ===
Result	Year	Tournament	Surface	Opponent	Score
Win	2025	Australian Open	Hard	(United States) Benjamin Willwerth	6–3, 6–4
