= 2009 Davidoff Swiss Indoors – Singles =

Singles
- 2009 Davidoff Swiss Indoors

Final
- Champion: (Serbia) Novak Djokovic
- Runner-up: (Switzerland) Roger Federer
- Score: 6–4, 4–6, 6–2

Details
- Draw: 32 (4 Q / 3 WC )
- Seeds: 8

Events
Singles	Doubles
- Swiss Indoors

Novak Djokovic defeated the three-time defending champion Roger Federer in the final, 6–4, 4–6, 6–2. He saved three match points en route to the title, in the semifinals against Radek Štěpánek.

== Seeds ==
1. (Switzerland) Roger Federer (final)
2. (Serbia) Novak Djokovic (champion)
3. (Chile) Fernando González (first round)
4. (Croatia) Marin Čilić (quarterfinals)
5. (Czech Republic) Radek Štěpánek (semifinals)
6. (Switzerland) Stanislas Wawrinka (quarterfinals)
7. (United States) James Blake (first round)
8. (Germany) Philipp Kohlschreiber (first round)

== Draw ==
Key

- Q = Qualifier
- WC = Wild card
- LL = Lucky loser
- Alt = Alternate
- ITF = ITF entry
- PR = Protected ranking
- SR = Special ranking
- SE = Special exempt
- JE = Junior exempt
- JR = Junior Accelerator Programme entrant
- CO = College Accelerator Programme entrant
- NG = Next Gen Accelerator Program entrant
- w/o = Walkover
- r = Retired
- d = Defaulted

=== Finals ===
Semifinals
1	(Switzerland) Roger Federer	7^{9}	6
WC	(Switzerland) Marco Chiudinelli	6^{7}	3
5	(Czech Republic) Radek Štěpánek	7^{7}	5	2
2	(Serbia) Novak Djokovic	6^{4}	7	6

Final
1	(Switzerland) Roger Federer	4	6	2
2	(Serbia) Novak Djokovic	6	4	6

=== Top half ===
First round
1	(Switzerland) R Federer	6	6
Q	(Belgium) O Rochus	3	4
(Italy) A Seppi	4	6	7
WC	(Switzerland) S Bohli	6	1	5
(Italy) S Bolelli	6	6^{4}	2
Q	(Russia) E Korolev	3	7^{7}	6
(France) J Chardy	7^{7}	6^{6}	6
7	(United States) J Blake	6^{4}	7^{8}	4
3	(Chile) F González	6^{3}	6	4
(United States) J Isner	7^{7}	4	6
(Argentina) H Zeballos	6^{3}	4
(France) R Gasquet	7^{7}	6
(Austria) D Köllerer	6	2	5
Q	(Switzerland) M Lammer	3	6	7
WC	(Switzerland) M Chiudinelli	7^{7}	3	7
8	(Germany) P Kohlschreiber	6^{5}	6	5

Second round
1	(Switzerland) R Federer	6	6
(Italy) A Seppi	3	3
Q	(Russia) E Korolev	6	7^{7}
(France) J Chardy	4	6^{1}
(United States) J Isner	6	6^{9}	2
(France) R Gasquet	4	7^{11}	6
Q	(Switzerland) M Lammer	6	3	3
WC	(Switzerland) M Chiudinelli	2	6	6

Quarterfinals
1	(Switzerland) R Federer	6	6
Q	(Russia) E Korolev	3	2
(France) R Gasquet	1	3
WC	(Switzerland) M Chiudinelli	6	6

Semifinals
1	(Switzerland) R Federer	7^{9}	6
WC	(Switzerland) M Chiudinelli	6^{7}	3

=== Bottom half ===
First round
5	(Czech Republic) R Štěpánek	6	6
(Germany) R Schüttler	2	0
(Croatia) I Karlović	6^{5}	4
LL	(France) F Serra	7^{7}	6
(Serbia) V Troicki	6	7^{7}
(Germany) B Becker	2	6^{5}
(Germany) P Petzschner	4	4
4/WC	(Croatia) M Čilić	6	6
6	(Switzerland) S Wawrinka	6^{5}	6	6
(Croatia) I Ljubičić	7^{7}	3	4
(Finland) J Nieminen	7	6
(France) J Benneteau	5	2
Q	(Australia) P Luczak	3	4
(Czech Republic) J Hernych	6	6
(Germany) A Beck	3	5
2	(Serbia) N Djokovic	6	7

Second round
5	(Czech Republic) R Štěpánek	3	7^{7}	7^{7}
LL	(France) F Serra	6	6^{1}	6^{1}
(Serbia) V Troicki	6^{7}	7^{10}	6^{6}
4/WC	(Croatia) M Čilić	7^{9}	6^{8}	7^{8}
6	(Switzerland) S Wawrinka	7	2	6
(Finland) J Nieminen	5	6	1
(Czech Republic) J Hernych	0	0
2	(Serbia) N Djokovic	6	6

Quarterfinals
5	(Czech Republic) R Štěpánek	4	6	6
4/WC	(Croatia) M Čilić	6	3	3
6	(Switzerland) S Wawrinka	6	6^{5}	2
2	(Serbia) N Djokovic	3	7^{7}	6

Semifinals
5	(Czech Republic) R Štěpánek	7^{7}	5	2
2	(Serbia) N Djokovic	6^{4}	7	6

== Qualifying ==
=== Seeds ===
1. (Kazakhstan) Evgeny Korolev (qualified)
2. (Belgium) Olivier Rochus (qualified)
3. (France) Florent Serra (qualifying competition, lucky loser)
4. (Portugal) Fred Gil (first round)
5. (Australia) Peter Luczak (qualified)
6. (Germany) Nicolas Kiefer (first round)
7. (Czech Republic) Jan Hájek (qualifying competition)
8. (Germany) Michael Berrer (qualifying competition)

=== Qualifiers ===
1. (Kazakhstan) Evgeny Korolev
2. (Belgium) Olivier Rochus
3. (Australia) Peter Luczak
4. (Switzerland) Michael Lammer

=== Lucky losers ===
1. (France) Florent Serra

=== Draw ===
==== First qualifier ====
First round
1	(Kazakhstan) Evgeny Korolev	6	6
WC	(Switzerland) Sandro Ehrat	1	0
(Switzerland) George Bastl	4	6^{3}
7	(Czech Republic) Jan Hájek	6	7^{7}

Qualifying competition
1	(Kazakhstan) Evgeny Korolev	6	6
7	(Czech Republic) Jan Hájek	3	1

==== Second qualifier ====
First round
2	(Belgium) Olivier Rochus	4	6	7^{7}
(France) Josselin Ouanna	6	3	6^{4}
WC	(Switzerland) Alexander Sadecky	3	4
8	(Germany) Michael Berrer	6	6

Qualifying competition
2	(Belgium) Olivier Rochus	6^{5}	6	6
8	(Germany) Michael Berrer	7^{7}	3	2

==== Third qualifier ====
First round
3	(France) Florent Serra	5	6	6
(France) Édouard Roger-Vasselin	7	3	3
(Romania) Adrian Ungur	1	3
5	(Australia) Peter Luczak	6	6

Qualifying competition
3	(France) Florent Serra	7^{8}	3	4
5	(Australia) Peter Luczak	6^{6}	6	6

==== Fourth qualifier ====
First round
4	(Portugal) Fred Gil	3	5
WC	(Switzerland) Roman Valent	6	7
(Switzerland) Michael Lammer	1	6
6	(Germany) Nicolas Kiefer	6	5^{r}

Qualifying competition
WC	(Switzerland) Roman Valent	4	7^{7}	3
(Switzerland) Michael Lammer	6	6^{5}	6
