= 2025 Swiss Indoors =

- Date: 20–26 October
- Edition: 54th
- Category: ATP 500
- Draw: 32S / 16D
- Surface: Hard / indoor
- Location: Basel, Switzerland
- Venue: St. Jakobshalle

Champions

Singles
- (Brazil) João Fonseca

Doubles
- (Spain) Marcel Granollers / (Argentina) Horacio Zeballos
- Swiss Indoors

The 2025 Swiss Indoors Basel was a men's tennis tournament played on indoor hardcourts. It was the 54th edition of the event, and part of the ATP 500 tournaments of the 2025 ATP Tour. It was held at the St. Jakobshalle in Basel, Switzerland, from 20 to 26 October 2025.

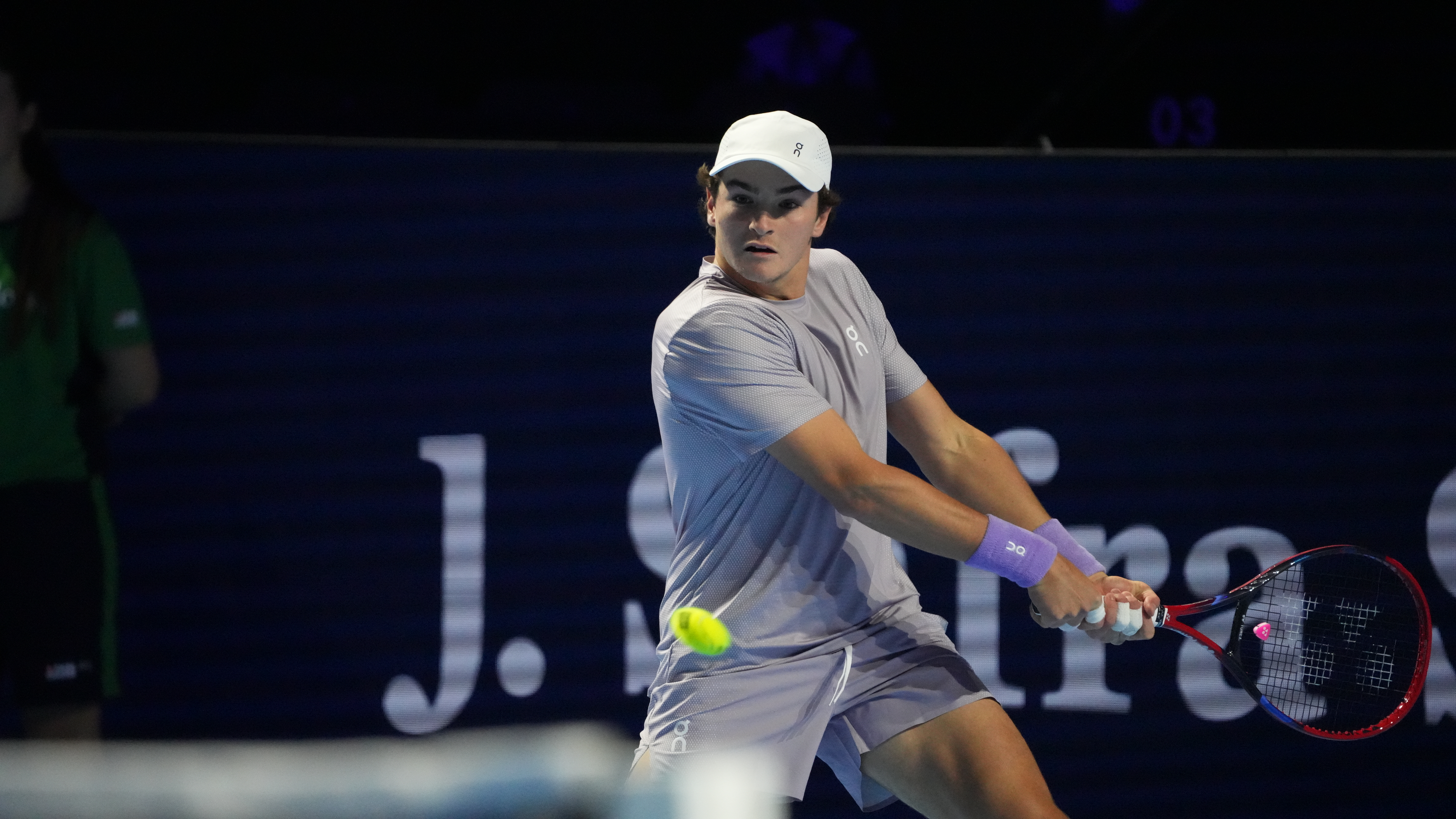
João Fonseca (Brazil, ATP 46) won the Swiss Indoors Basel 2025.

João Fonseca (Brazil, ATP 46) won the final against Alejandro Davidovich Fokina (Spain, ATP 18) 6–3, 6–4. Fonseca thus became the second teenager after Jim Courier to win the Swiss Indoors event. In doubles, the pairing of Marcel Granollers (Spain) and Horacio Zeballos (Argentina) triumphed, defeating Adam Pavlasek (Czech Republic) and Jan Zielinski (Poland) 6–2, 7–5 in the final.

== Finals ==
=== Singles ===
- (Brazil) João Fonseca def. (Spain) Alejandro Davidovich Fokina, 6–3, 6–4

=== Doubles ===
- (Spain) Marcel Granollers / (Argentina) Horacio Zeballos def. (Czech Republic) Adam Pavlásek / (Poland) Jan Zieliński, 6–2, 7–5

== Singles main draw entrants ==
=== Seeds ===
Country	Player	Rank^{1}	Seed
USA	Taylor Fritz	4	1
USA	Ben Shelton	6	2
~~DEN~~	~~Holger Rune~~	~~11~~	~~3~~
NOR	Casper Ruud	12	4
CAN	Félix Auger-Aliassime	13	5
CZE	Jiří Lehečka	17	6
CZE	Jakub Menšík	19	7
ESP	Alejandro Davidovich Fokina	20	8
CAN	Denis Shapovalov	23	9

- Rankings are as of 13 October 2025

=== Other entrants ===
The following players received wildcards into the singles main draw:

- (Switzerland) Henry Bernet
- (Monaco) Valentin Vacherot
- (Switzerland) Stan Wawrinka

The following player received entry using a protected ranking:

- (United States) Jenson Brooksby

The following player using a special exempt:

- (Belgium) Raphaël Collignon

The following players received entry from the qualifying draw:

- (Switzerland) Rémy Bertola
- (Croatia) Marin Čilić
- (Poland) Kamil Majchrzak
- (United States) Reilly Opelka

The following players received entry as lucky losers:

- (Belgium) David Goffin
- (France) Quentin Halys
- (France) Valentin Royer
- (Netherlands) Botic van de Zandschulp

=== Withdrawals ===
- (Belgium) Zizou Bergs → replaced by (Belgium) David Goffin
- (France) Benjamin Bonzi → replaced by (France) Quentin Halys
- (France) Arthur Fils → replaced by (United States) Jenson Brooksby
- (France) Arthur Rinderknech → replaced by (France) Valentin Royer
- (Denmark) Holger Rune → replaced by (Netherlands) Botic van de Zandschulp

== Doubles main draw entrants ==
=== Seeds ===
Country	Player	Country	Player	Rank^{1}	Seed
ESP	Marcel Granollers	ARG	Horacio Zeballos	15	1
ITA	Simone Bolelli	ITA	Andrea Vavassori	29	2
USA	Christian Harrison	USA	Evan King	33	3
MON	Hugo Nys	FRA	Édouard Roger-Vasselin	37	4

- ^{1} Rankings as of 13 October 2025

=== Other entrants ===
The following pairs received wildcards into the doubles main draw:

- (France) Pierre-Hugues Herbert / (France) Nicolas Mahut
- (Switzerland) Marc-Andrea Hüsler / (Switzerland) Jakub Paul

The following pair received entry from the qualifying draw:

- (Czech Republic) Petr Nouza / (Czech Republic) Patrik Rikl
