= Swiss Indoors =

Coordinates: 47.53834°N 7.618879°E

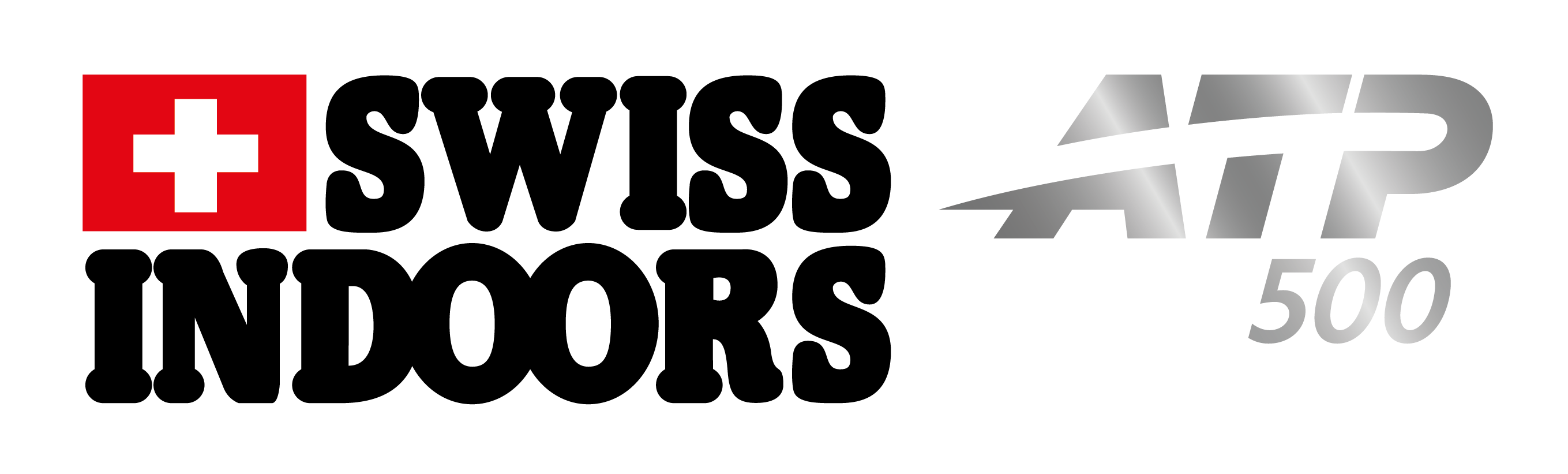

ATP Tour
- Founded: 1970; 56 years ago
- Editions: 54 (2025)
- Location: Basel; Switzerland
- Venue: St. Jakobshalle
- Category: ATP Tour 500 (2009–present); ATP World Series/ATP International Series (1990–2008); Grand Prix tennis circuit (1977–1989)
- Surface: Carpet – indoors (1970–77, 97, 1999–2006); Hard (indoor) (1978–96, 98, 2007–present)
- Draw: 32S / 16Q / 16D
- Prize money: €2,584,155 (2026)
- Website: swissindoorsbasel.ch

Current champions (2026)
- Singles: (Monaco) Valentin Vacherot
- Doubles: (France) Théo Arribagé (France) Albano Olivetti

The Swiss Indoors is a professional men's tennis tournament played on indoor hardcourts at the St. Jakobshalle in Basel, Switzerland.

== History ==
The historical precursor event to this tournament was called the Swiss International Covered Courts that ran from 1920 to 1959, that was a fully open event for international players. To fill that gap this tournament was created in 1970 by Roger Brennwald and originally featured mainly Swiss top players. It became an event on the Grand Prix tennis circuit in 1977, when Björn Borg won the title and stayed until 1989. Since 2009 it has been part of the World Tour 500 Series of the ATP Tour. Before 2009, it was part of the ATP World Series from 1990 until 1999 which became the ATP International Series in 2000. It has been held annually at the St. Jakobshalle in Basel, Switzerland, in October, since 1995. The budget is 17 million francs. No other sporting event in Switzerland records such high investments and reach.

Basel native Roger Federer holds the record for most singles titles, having won the tournament ten times, in 2006–2008, 2010–2011, 2014–2015 and 2017–2019. Federer has reached the final record fifteen times (2000–2001, 2006–2015, 2017–2019), which is also an Open Era record for most finals reached at a single ATP event.

Besides Federer, two other Swiss players have won the singles title: Michel Burgener, in 1972, and Jakob Hlasek, in 1991. The tournament was played on its unique red-colored indoor courts until 2010; starting in 2011 the court color was changed to the uniform blue courts of most other tournaments in the European fall indoor season.

The tournament has been sponsored in the past by Ebel and Davidoff.

== Past finals ==
=== Singles ===
| Year | Champions | Runners-up | Score |
|---|---|---|---|
| 1970 (Note: Tournament recognized as minor title by ATP.) | (West Germany) Klaus Berger | (Switzerland) Ernst Schori | 6–3, 6–1 |
| 1971 | (Czechoslovakia) Jiří Zahradníček | (Germany) Helmut Kuner | 1–6, 6–2, 6–3 |
| 1972 | (Switzerland) Michel Burgener | (Czechoslovakia) Petr Kanderal | 7–5, 4–6, 6–0 |
| 1973 | (France) Jean-Claude Barclay | (Switzerland) Leonardo Manta | 6–3, 7–5 |
| 1974 | (United Kingdom) Roger Taylor | (Switzerland) Petr Kanderal | 6–4, 6–2 |
| 1975 | (Czechoslovakia) Jiří Hřebec | (Romania) Ilie Năstase | 6–1, 7–6, 2–6, 6–3 |
| 1976 | (Czechoslovakia) Jan Kodeš | (Czechoslovakia) Jiří Hřebec | 6–4, 6–2, 6–3 |
↓ Grand Prix circuit ↓
| 1977 | (Sweden) Björn Borg | (United Kingdom) John Lloyd | 6–4, 6–2, 6–3 |
| 1978 | (Argentina) Guillermo Vilas | (United States) John McEnroe | 6–3, 5–7, 7–5, 6–4 |
| 1979 | (United States) Brian Gottfried | (South Africa) Johan Kriek | 7–5, 6–1, 4–6, 6–3 |
| 1980 | (Czechoslovakia) Ivan Lendl | (Sweden) Björn Borg | 6–3, 6–2, 5–7, 0–6, 6–4 |
| 1981 | (Czechoslovakia) Ivan Lendl (2) | (Argentina) José Luis Clerc | 6–2, 6–3, 6–0 |
| 1982 | (France) Yannick Noah | (Sweden) Mats Wilander | 6–4, 6–2, 6–3 |
| 1983 | (United States) Vitas Gerulaitis | (Poland) Wojtek Fibak | 4–6, 6–1, 7–5, 5–5 retired |
| 1984 | (Sweden) Joakim Nyström | (United States) Tim Wilkison | 6–3, 3–6, 6–4, 6–2 |
| 1985 | (Sweden) Stefan Edberg (1) | (France) Yannick Noah | 6–7^{(7–9)}, 6–4, 7–6^{(7–5)}, 6–1 |
| 1986 | (Sweden) Stefan Edberg (2) | (France) Yannick Noah | 7–6^{(7–5)}, 6–2, 6–7^{(7–9)}, 7–6^{(7–5)} |
| 1987 | (France) Yannick Noah (2) | (Haiti) Ronald Agénor | 7–6^{(8–6)}, 6–4, 6–4 |
| 1988 | (Sweden) Stefan Edberg (3) | (Switzerland) Jakob Hlasek | 7–5, 6–3, 3–6, 6–2 |
| 1989 | (United States) Jim Courier | (Sweden) Stefan Edberg | 7–6^{(8–6)}, 3–6, 2–6, 6–0, 7–5 |
↓ ATP Tour 250 (Note: Known as World Series from 1990 till 1999 and International Series from 2000 till 2008.) ↓
| 1990 | (United States) John McEnroe | (Socialist Federal Republic of Yugoslavia) Goran Ivanišević | 6–7^{(4–7)}, 4–6, 7–6^{(7–3)}, 6–3, 6–4 |
| 1991 | (Switzerland) Jakob Hlasek | (United States) John McEnroe | 7–6^{(7–4)}, 6–0, 6–3 |
| 1992 | (Germany) Boris Becker | (Czechoslovakia) Petr Korda | 3–6, 6–3, 6–2, 6–4 |
| 1993 | (Germany) Michael Stich | (Sweden) Stefan Edberg | 6–4, 6–7^{(5–7)}, 6–3, 6–2 |
| 1994 | (South Africa) Wayne Ferreira | (United States) Patrick McEnroe | 4–6, 6–2, 7–6^{(9–7)}, 6–3 |
| 1995 | (United States) Jim Courier (2) | (Netherlands) Jan Siemerink | 6–7^{(2–7)}, 7–6^{(7–5)}, 5–7, 6–2, 7–5 |
| 1996 | (United States) Pete Sampras | (Germany) Hendrik Dreekmann | 7–5, 6–2, 6–0 |
| 1997 | (United Kingdom) Greg Rusedski | (Australia) Mark Philippoussis | 6–3, 7–6^{(8–6)}, 7–6^{(7–3)} |
| 1998 | (United Kingdom) Tim Henman | (United States) Andre Agassi | 6–4, 6–3, 3–6, 6–4 |
| 1999 | (Slovakia) Karol Kučera | (United Kingdom) Tim Henman | 6–4, 7–6^{(12–10)}, 4–6, 4–6, 7–6^{(7–2)} |
| 2000 | (Sweden) Thomas Enqvist | (Switzerland) Roger Federer | 6–2, 4–6, 7–6^{(7–4)}, 1–6, 6–1 |
| 2001 | (United Kingdom) Tim Henman (2) | (Switzerland) Roger Federer | 6–3, 6–4, 6–2 |
| 2002 | (Argentina) David Nalbandian | (Chile) Fernando González | 6–4, 6–3, 6–2 |
| 2003 | (Argentina) Guillermo Coria | (Argentina) David Nalbandian | walkover |
| 2004 | (Czech Republic) Jiří Novák | (Argentina) David Nalbandian | 5–7, 6–3, 6–4, 1–6, 6–2 |
| 2005 | (Chile) Fernando González | (Cyprus) Marcos Baghdatis | 6–7^{(8–10)}, 6–3, 7–5, 6–4 |
| 2006 | (Switzerland) Roger Federer | (Chile) Fernando González | 6–3, 6–2, 7–6^{(7–3)} |
| 2007 | (Switzerland) Roger Federer (2) | (Finland) Jarkko Nieminen | 6–3, 6–4 |
| 2008 | (Switzerland) Roger Federer (3) | (Argentina) David Nalbandian | 6–3, 6–4 |
↓ ATP Tour 500 ↓
| 2009 | (Serbia) Novak Djokovic | (Switzerland) Roger Federer | 6–4, 4–6, 6–2 |
| 2010 | (Switzerland) Roger Federer (4) | (Serbia) Novak Djokovic | 6–4, 3–6, 6–1 |
| 2011 | (Switzerland) Roger Federer (5) | (Japan) Kei Nishikori | 6–1, 6–3 |
| 2012 | (Argentina) Juan Martín del Potro | (Switzerland) Roger Federer | 6–4, 6–7^{(5–7)}, 7–6^{(7–3)} |
| 2013 | (Argentina) Juan Martín del Potro (2) | (Switzerland) Roger Federer | 7–6^{(7–3)}, 2–6, 6–4 |
| 2014 | (Switzerland) Roger Federer (6) | (Belgium) David Goffin | 6–2, 6–2 |
| 2015 | (Switzerland) Roger Federer (7) | (Spain) Rafael Nadal | 6–3, 5–7, 6–3 |
| 2016 | (Croatia) Marin Čilić | (Japan) Kei Nishikori | 6–1, 7–6^{(7–5)} |
| 2017 | (Switzerland) Roger Federer (8) | (Argentina) Juan Martín del Potro | 6–7^{(5–7)}, 6–4, 6–3 |
| 2018 | (Switzerland) Roger Federer (9) | (Romania) Marius Copil | 7–6^{(7–5)}, 6–4 |
| 2019 | (Switzerland) Roger Federer (10) | (Australia) Alex de Minaur | 6–2, 6–2 |
| 2020 | No competition (due to COVID-19 pandemic) | | |
| 2021 | No competition (due to COVID-19 pandemic) | | |
| 2022 | (Canada) Félix Auger-Aliassime | (Denmark) Holger Rune | 6–3, 7–5 |
| 2023 | (Canada) Félix Auger-Aliassime (2) | (Poland) Hubert Hurkacz | 7–6^{(7–3)}, 7–6^{(7–5)} |
| 2024 | (France) Giovanni Mpetshi Perricard | (United States) Ben Shelton | 6–4, 7–6^{(7–4)} |
| 2025 | (Brazil) João Fonseca | (Spain) Alejandro Davidovich Fokina | 6–3, 6–4 |
| 2026 | (Monaco) Valentin Vacherot | (Czech Republic) Jiří Lehečka | 2–6, 6–3, 6–3 |

=== Doubles ===
| Year | Champions | Runners-up | Score |
|---|---|---|---|
| 1976 | (South Africa) Frew McMillan (Netherlands) Tom Okker | (Czechoslovakia) Jiří Hřebec (Czechoslovakia) Jan Kodeš | 6–4, 7–6, 6–4 |
↓ Grand Prix circuit ↓
| 1977 | (United Kingdom) Mark Cox (United Kingdom) Buster Mottram | (United Kingdom) John Feaver (Australia) John James | 7–5, 6–4, 6–3 |
| 1978 | (Poland) Wojtek Fibak (United States) John McEnroe | (United States) Bruce Manson (Rhodesia) Andrew Pattison | 7–6, 7–5 |
| 1979 | (South Africa) Bob Hewitt (South Africa) Frew McMillan (2) | (United States) Brian Gottfried (Mexico) Raúl Ramírez | 6–3, 6–4 |
| 1980 | (South Africa) Kevin Curren (United States) Steve Denton | (South Africa) Bob Hewitt (South Africa) Frew McMillan | 6–7, 6–4, 6–4 |
| 1981 | (Argentina) José Luis Clerc (Romania) Ilie Năstase | (Switzerland) Markus Günthardt (Czechoslovakia) Pavel Složil | 7–6, 6–7, 7–6 |
| 1982 | (France) Henri Leconte (France) Yannick Noah | (United States) Fritz Buehning (Czechoslovakia) Pavel Složil | 6–2, 6–2 |
| 1983 | (Czechoslovakia) Pavel Složil (Czechoslovakia) Tomáš Šmíd | (Sweden) Stefan Edberg (Romania) Florin Segărceanu | 6–1, 3–6, 7–6 |
| 1984 | (Czechoslovakia) Pavel Složil (2) (Czechoslovakia) Tomáš Šmíd (2) | (Sweden) Stefan Edberg (United States) Tim Wilkison | 7–6, 6–2 |
| 1985 | (United States) Tim Gullikson (United States) Tom Gullikson | (United States) Mark Dickson (United States) Tim Wilkison | 4–6, 6–4, 6–4 |
| 1986 | (France) Guy Forget (France) Yannick Noah (2) | (Sweden) Jan Gunnarsson (Czechoslovakia) Tomáš Šmíd | 7–6, 6–4 |
| 1987 | (Sweden) Anders Järryd (Czechoslovakia) Tomáš Šmíd (3) | (Czechoslovakia) Stanislav Birner (Czechoslovakia) Jaroslav Navrátil | 6–4, 6–3 |
| 1988 | (Switzerland) Jakob Hlasek (Czechoslovakia) Tomáš Šmíd (4) | (United Kingdom) Jeremy Bates (Sweden) Peter Lundgren | 6–3, 6–1 |
| 1989 | (West Germany) Udo Riglewski (West Germany) Michael Stich | (Italy) Omar Camporese (Switzerland) Claudio Mezzadri | 6–3, 4–6, 6–0 |
↓ ATP Tour 250 ↓
| 1990 | (South Africa) Stefan Kruger (South Africa) Christo van Rensburg | (United Kingdom) Neil Broad (South Africa) Gary Muller | 4–6, 7–6, 6–3 |
| 1991 | (Switzerland) Jakob Hlasek (2) (United States) Patrick McEnroe | (Czechoslovakia) Petr Korda (United States) John McEnroe | 3–6, 7–6, 7–6 |
| 1992 | (Netherlands) Tom Nijssen (Czechoslovakia) Cyril Suk | (Czechoslovakia) Karel Nováček (Czechoslovakia) David Rikl | 6–3, 6–4 |
| 1993 | (Zimbabwe) Byron Black (United States) Jonathan Stark | (United States) Brad Pearce (United States) Dave Randall | 3–6, 7–5, 6–3 |
| 1994 | (United States) Patrick McEnroe (2) (United States) Jared Palmer | (South Africa) Lan Bale (South Africa) John-Laffnie de Jager | 6–3, 7–6 |
| 1995 | (Czech Republic) Cyril Suk (2) (Czech Republic) Daniel Vacek | (United States) Mark Keil (Sweden) Peter Nyborg | 3–6, 6–3, 6–3 |
| 1996 | (Russia) Yevgeny Kafelnikov (Czech Republic) Daniel Vacek (2) | (South Africa) David Adams (Netherlands) Menno Oosting | 6–3, 6–4 |
| 1997 | (United Kingdom) Tim Henman (Switzerland) Marc Rosset | (Germany) Karsten Braasch (United States) Jim Grabb | 7–6, 6–7, 7–6 |
| 1998 | (France) Olivier Delaître (France) Fabrice Santoro | (South Africa) Piet Norval (Zimbabwe) Kevin Ullyett | 6–3, 7–6 |
| 1999 | (South Africa) Brent Haygarth (North Macedonia) Aleksandar Kitinov | (Czech Republic) Jiří Novák (Czech Republic) David Rikl | 0–6, 6–4, 7–5 |
| 2000 | (United States) Donald Johnson (South Africa) Piet Norval | (Switzerland) Roger Federer (Slovakia) Dominik Hrbatý | 7–6^{(11–9)}, 4–6, 7–6^{(7–4)} |
| 2001 | (South Africa) Ellis Ferreira (United States) Rick Leach | (India) Mahesh Bhupathi (India) Leander Paes | 7–6^{(7–3)}, 6–4 |
| 2002 | (United States) Bob Bryan (United States) Mike Bryan | (The Bahamas) Mark Knowles (Canada) Daniel Nestor | 7–6^{(7–1)}, 7–5 |
| 2003 | (The Bahamas) Mark Knowles (Canada) Daniel Nestor | (Argentina) Lucas Arnold Ker (Argentina) Mariano Hood | 6–4, 6–2 |
| 2004 | (United States) Bob Bryan (2) (United States) Mike Bryan (2) | (Argentina) Lucas Arnold Ker (Argentina) Mariano Hood | 7–6^{(11–9)}, 6–2 |
| 2005 | (Argentina) Agustín Calleri (Chile) Fernando González | (Australia) Stephen Huss (South Africa) Wesley Moodie | 7–5, 7–5 |
| 2006 | (The Bahamas) Mark Knowles (2) (Canada) Daniel Nestor (2) | (Poland) Mariusz Fyrstenberg (Poland) Marcin Matkowski | 4–6, 6–4, [10–8] |
| 2007 | (United States) Bob Bryan (3) (United States) Mike Bryan (3) | (United States) James Blake (The Bahamas) Mark Knowles | 6–1, 6–1 |
| 2008 | (India) Mahesh Bhupathi (The Bahamas) Mark Knowles (3) | (Germany) Christopher Kas (Germany) Philipp Kohlschreiber | 6–3, 6–3 |
↓ ATP Tour 500 ↓
| 2009 | (Canada) Daniel Nestor (3) (Serbia) Nenad Zimonjić | (United States) Bob Bryan (United States) Mike Bryan | 6–2, 6–3 |
| 2010 | (United States) Bob Bryan (4) (United States) Mike Bryan (4) | (Canada) Daniel Nestor (Serbia) Nenad Zimonjić | 6–3, 3–6, [10–3] |
| 2011 | (France) Michaël Llodra (Serbia) Nenad Zimonjić (2) | (Belarus) Max Mirnyi (Canada) Daniel Nestor | 6–4, 7–5 |
| 2012 | (Canada) Daniel Nestor (4) (Serbia) Nenad Zimonjić (3) | (Philippines) Treat Conrad Huey (United Kingdom) Dominic Inglot | 7–5, 6–7^{(4–7)}, [10–5] |
| 2013 | (Philippines) Treat Conrad Huey (United Kingdom) Dominic Inglot | (Austria) Julian Knowle (Austria) Oliver Marach | 6–3, 3–6, [10–4] |
| 2014 | (Canada) Vasek Pospisil (Serbia) Nenad Zimonjić (4) | (Croatia) Marin Draganja (Finland) Henri Kontinen | 7–6^{(15–13)}, 1–6, [10–5] |
| 2015 | (Austria) Alexander Peya (Brazil) Bruno Soares | (United Kingdom) Jamie Murray (Australia) John Peers | 7–5, 7–5 |
| 2016 | (Spain) Marcel Granollers (United States) Jack Sock | (Sweden) Robert Lindstedt (New Zealand) Michael Venus | 6–3, 6–4 |
| 2017 | (Croatia) Ivan Dodig (Spain) Marcel Granollers (2) | (France) Fabrice Martin (France) Édouard Roger-Vasselin | 7–5, 7–6^{(8–6)} |
| 2018 | (United Kingdom) Dominic Inglot (2) (Croatia) Franko Škugor | (Germany) Alexander Zverev (Germany) Mischa Zverev | 6–2, 7–5 |
| 2019 | (Netherlands) Jean-Julien Rojer (Romania) Horia Tecău | (United States) Taylor Fritz (United States) Reilly Opelka | 7–5, 6–3 |
| 2020 | No competition (due to COVID-19 pandemic) | | |
| 2021 | No competition (due to COVID-19 pandemic) | | |
| 2022 | (Croatia) Ivan Dodig (2) (United States) Austin Krajicek | (France) Nicolas Mahut (France) Édouard Roger-Vasselin | 6–4, 7–6^{(7–5)} |
| 2023 | (Mexico) Santiago González (France) Édouard Roger-Vasselin | (Monaco) Hugo Nys (Poland) Jan Zieliński | 6–7^{(8–10)}, 7–6^{(7–3)}, [10–1] |
| 2024 | (United Kingdom) Jamie Murray (Australia) John Peers | (Netherlands) Wesley Koolhof (Croatia) Nikola Mektić | 6–3, 7–5 |
| 2025 | (Spain) Marcel Granollers (3) (Argentina) Horacio Zeballos | (Czech Republic) Adam Pavlásek (Poland) Jan Zieliński | 6–2, 7–5 |
| 2026 | (France) Théo Arribagé (France) Albano Olivetti | (Switzerland) Henry Bernet (Switzerland) Dominic Stricker | 7–6^{(8–6)}, 7–6^{(8–6)} |

== Statistics ==
=== Records ===
- Most singles titles: 10
  - (Switzerland) Roger Federer (2006–2008, 2010–2011, 2014–2015, 2017–2019)
- Most singles finals: 15 (10 titles, 5 runner-ups)
  - (Switzerland) Roger Federer (2000–2001, 2006–2015, 2017–2019)
- Most consecutive singles finals: 10
  - (Switzerland) Roger Federer (2006–2015)
- Most tournament appearances: 19
  - (Switzerland) Roger Federer (1998–2003, 2006–2015, 2017–2019)
- Most matches played: 84
  - (Switzerland) Roger Federer (1998–2003, 2006–2015, 2017–2019)
- Most matches won: 75
  - (Switzerland) Roger Federer (1998–2003, 2006–2015, 2017–2019)

=== Multiple winners ===
| # | Multiple titles |
|---|---|
| 10 | (Switzerland) Roger Federer |
| 3 | (Sweden) Stefan Edberg |
| 2 | (Czechoslovakia) Ivan Lendl |
| 2 | (France) Yannick Noah |
| 2 | (United States) Jim Courier |
| 2 | (United Kingdom) Tim Henman |
| 2 | (Argentina) Juan Martin del Potro |
| 2 | (Canada) Félix Auger-Aliassime |

== See also ==
- Swiss Open
