= Leander Paes career statistics =

Career finals
Discipline	Type	Won	Lost	Total
Doubles
Doubles	Grand Slam	8	8	16
Doubles	ATP Finals	–	4	4
Doubles	ATP 1000	13	5	18
Doubles	ATP 500	6	10	16
Doubles	ATP 250	28	16	44
Doubles	Olympics	–	–	0
Doubles	Total	55	43	98
Mixed Doubles
Mixed Doubles	Grand Slam	10	8	18
Mixed Doubles	Total	10	8	18

This is a list of the main career statistics of Indian professional tennis player Leander Paes.

== Performance timelines ==
Key
W	F	SF	QF	#R	RR	Q#	P#	DNQ	A	Z#	PO	G	S	B	NMS	NTI	P	NH

(W) winner; (F) finalist; (SF) semifinalist; (QF) quarterfinalist; (#R) rounds 4, 3, 2, 1; (RR) round-robin stage; (Q#) qualification round; (P#) preliminary round; (DNQ) did not qualify; (A) absent; (Z#) Davis/Fed Cup Zonal Group (with number indication) or (PO) play-off; (G) gold, (S) silver or (B) bronze Olympic/Paralympic medal; (NMS) not a Masters tournament; (NTI) not a Tier I tournament; (P) postponed; (NH) not held; (SR) strike rate (events won / competed); (W–L) win–loss record.

=== Singles ===
Tournament	1991	1992	1993	1994	1995	1996	1997	1998	1999	2000	2001	SR	W–L
Grand Slam tournaments
Australian Open	A	A	Q1	Q2	1R	A	2R	1R	1R	2R	Q3	0 / 5	2–5
French Open	A	A	Q2	A	A	A	2R	Q3	Q2	Q1	A	0 / 1	1–1
Wimbledon	Q2	Q1	Q1	Q3	A	1R	1R	1R	1R	A	2R	0 / 5	1–5
US Open	A	Q3	Q2	1R	Q3	2R	3R	1R	Q1	A	A	0 / 4	3–4
Win–loss	0–0	0–0	0–0	0–1	0–1	1–2	4–4	0–3	0–2	1–1	1–1	0 / 15	7–15
National representation
Summer Olympics	NH	1R	Not Held			SF-B	Not Held			1R	NH	0 / 3	5–3
Career statistics
Titles / Finals	0 / 0	0 / 0	0 / 0	0 / 0	0 / 0	0 / 0	0 / 0	1 / 1	0 / 0	0 / 0	0 / 0	1 / 1	
Year-end ranking	278	194	260	139	130	129	122	91	142	188	299		

=== Doubles ===
Tournament	1990	1991	1992	1993	1994	1995	1996	1997	1998	1999	2000	2001	2002	2003	2004	2005	2006	2007	2008	2009	2010	2011	2012	2013	2014	2015	2016	2017	2018	2019	2020	SR	W–L
Grand Slam tournaments
Australian Open	A	A	A	A	2R	QF	A	1R	SF	F	1R	1R	2R	QF	1R	A	F	3R	2R	SF	QF	F	W	1R	QF	2R	1R	1R	3R	1R	A	1 / 24	49–23
French Open	A	A	A	A	A	A	A	2R	SF	W	1R	W	SF	SF	2R	QF	1R	2R	3R	W	F	2R	2R	2R	A	3R	QF	2R	A	2R	A	3 / 21	53–18
Wimbledon	A	A	Q1	1R	3R	A	2R	1R	2R	W	A	1R	1R	SF	2R	QF	SF	QF	SF	1R	2R	2R	3R	SF	SF	3R	2R	1R	A	1R	NH	1 / 24	44–23
US Open	A	A	A	SF	2R	1R	Q1	SF	SF	F	1R	1R	2R	A	F	1R	W	1R	F	W	1R	QF	F	W	3R	2R	1R	2R	1R	1R	A	3 / 25	59–22
Win–loss	0–0	0–0	0–0	4–2	4–3	3–2	1–1	5–4	13–4	22–2	0–3	6–3	6–4	11–3	7–4	6–3	15–3	6–4	12–4	16–2	9–4	10–4	14–3	11–3	9–3	6–4	4–4	2–4	2–2	1–4	0–0	8 / 94	205–86
Year-end championships
ATP Finals	Did not qualify							F	RR	F	F	RR	NH	A	DNQ	F	SF	SF	RR	RR	RR	SF	SF	RR	Did not qualify							0 / 14	20–29
National representation
Olympics	NH		QF	Not Held			2R	Not Held			2R	Not Held			4th	Not Held			QF	Not Held			2R	Not Held			1R	Not Held				0 / 7	10–8
Davis Cup	Z1	PO	PO	SF	1R	PO	QF	1R	1R	Z1	PO	PO	PO	PO	Z1	PO	Z1	Z1	PO	PO	1R	A	Z1	Z1	PO	PO	PO	PO	PO	Z1	QR	0 / 6	45–13
Win–loss	1–1	4–0	4–1	1–2	0–2	3–0	1–3	2–0	1–0	2–0	2–2	3–0	2–1	2–0	5–2	3–0	2–0	2–0	4–1	1–0	2–0	0–0	1–2	2–0	1–0	0–1	1–2	0–1	1–0	1–0	1–0	0 / 13	55–21
ATP Tour Masters 1000
Indian Wells Open	A	A	A	A	A	Q2	1R	1R	A	SF	2R	1R	1R	SF	1R	QF	2R	W	QF	2R	1R	2R	QF	A	QF	2R	A	1R	A	A	NH	1 / 19	22–18
Miami Open	A	A	A	A	2R	1R	2R	2R	2R	2R	2R	A	2R	F	QF	1R	A	F	QF	2R	W	W	W	2R	1R	1R	A	A	A	A	NH	3 / 20	33–17
Monte-Carlo Masters	A	A	A	A	A	A	A	A	SF	2R	A	SF	1R	2R	A	W	2R	A	2R	SF	2R	A	QF	QF	A	2R	A	A	A	A	NH	1 / 13	14–12
Italian Open	A	A	A	A	A	A	A	W	A	A	A	1R	1R	2R	2R	QF	2R	SF	2R	QF	QF	2R	2R	2R	A	2R	A	A	A	A	A	1 / 15	10–14
Madrid Open	Not Held												2R	A	1R	F	1R	2R	2R	A	SF	A	QF	2R	A	2R	A	A	A	A	NH	0 / 10	6–10
Canadian Open	A	A	A	A	A	A	A	W	SF	QF	A	1R	QF	QF	W	2R	SF	QF	SF	A	2R	2R	SF	2R	2R	2R	A	A	A	A	NH	2 / 17	21–15
Cincinnati Open	A	A	A	1R	A	A	A	QF	A	2R	A	W	1R	2R	QF	QF	SF	SF	QF	2R	2R	W	2R	QF	2R	QF	A	1R	A	A	A	2 / 19	20–17
Shanghai Masters	Not Held																			A	W	SF	W	2R	2R	2R	A	A	A	A	NH	2 / 6	12–4
Paris Masters	A	A	A	A	A	A	A	2R	W	A	A	F	2R	1R	1R	A	1R	2R	A	2R	QF	2R	2R	2R	QF	1R	A	A	A	A	A	1 / 15	11–14
German Open	A	A	A	A	A	A	A	A	A	2R	A	1R	2R	SF	SF	SF	A	A	SF	Not Masters Series												0 / 7	11–6
Eurocard Open	Not Masters Series						A	QF	F	A	A	QF	Discontinued																			0 / 3	5–3
Win–loss	0–0	0–0	0–0	0–1	1–1	0–1	1–2	9–5	16–4	3–5	1–2	12–7	5–9	9–7	11–7	12–8	6–6	12–6	11–9	5–6	12–7	11–5	14–7	4–8	5–6	5–9	0–0	0–2	0–0	0–0	0–0	13 / 144	165–130
Career statistics
Titles	0	0	0	0	0	0	0	6	6	5	2	4	2	3	4	3	2	2	1	2	2	3	4	2	1	1	0	0	0	0	0	55	
Finals	0	0	0	0	0	1	0	7	8	9	3	6	2	5	6	6	3	5	5	4	6	5	6	2	2	3	2	0	2	0	0	98	
Overall W–L	1–1	4–0	4–2	8–8	5–8	13–10	5–13	44–17	55–16	48–14	18–14	40–16	24–23	36–15	42–18	36–19	33–20	40–19	41–26	28–17	32–20	32–14	43–19	29–18	26–16	27–26	14–16	16–22	11–14	12–14	3–2	770–457	
Year-end ranking	–	481	179	93	142	76	89	14	4	1	84	9	33	13	13	12	12	12	10	8	5	8	3	10	29	41	59	63	63	105	129	62.75%	

=== Mixed doubles ===
Tournament	1994	1995	1996	1997	1998	1999	2000	2001	2002	2003	2004	2005	2006	2007	2008	2009	2010	2011	2012	2013	2014	2015	2016	2017	2018	2019	2020	SR
Grand Slam tournaments
Australian Open	A	A	A	A	A	1R	1R	2R	2R	W	F	A	SF	QF	2R	2R	W	2R	F	2R	QF	W	QF	QF	A	2R	2R	3 / 20
French Open	A	A	A	3R	2R	QF	3R	QF	2R	2R	2R	F	QF	QF	1R	2R	QF	QF	SF	2R	A	2R	W	1R	A	A	NH	1 / 20
Wimbledon	3R	A	1R	QF	QF	W	A	3R	QF	W	3R	A	QF	QF	2R	F	W	QF	F	2R	2R	W	3R	1R	A	1R	NH	4 / 22
US Open	A	1R	A	1R	1R	2R	1R	F	2R	A	SF	QF	1R	F	W	F	QF	SF	QF	A	QF	W	2R	A	A	A	NH	2 / 19
SR	0 / 1	0 / 1	0 / 1	0 / 3	0 / 3	1 / 4	0 / 3	0 / 4	0 / 4	2 / 3	0 / 4	0 / 2	0 / 4	0 / 4	1 / 4	0 / 4	2 / 4	0 / 4	0 / 4	0 / 3	0 / 3	3 / 4	1 / 4	0 / 3	0 / 0	0 / 1	0 / 1	10 / 81
National representation
Summer Olympics	Not held																		QF	Not held			A	Not held				0 / 1

== Grand Slam finals ==
=== Doubles: 16 (8 titles, 8 runner-ups) ===
By winning the 2012 Australian Open title, Paes achieved the career Grand Slam.

Outcome	Year	Championship	Surface	Partner	Opponents	Score
Runner-up	1999	Australian Open	Hard	(India) Mahesh Bhupathi	(Sweden) Jonas Björkman (Australia) Patrick Rafter	3–6, 6–4, 4–6, 7–6^{(12–10)}, 4–6
Winner	1999	French Open	Clay	(India) Mahesh Bhupathi	(Croatia) Goran Ivanišević (United States) Jeff Tarango	6–2, 7–5
Winner	1999	Wimbledon	Grass	(India) Mahesh Bhupathi	(Netherlands) Paul Haarhuis (United States) Jared Palmer	6–7^{(10–12)}, 6–3, 6–4, 7–6^{(7–4)}
Runner-up	1999	US Open	Hard	(India) Mahesh Bhupathi	(Canada) Sébastien Lareau (United States) Alex O'Brien	6–7, 4–6
Winner	2001	French Open (2)	Clay	(India) Mahesh Bhupathi	(Czech Republic) Petr Pála (Czech Republic) Pavel Vízner	7–6, 6–3
Runner-up	2004	US Open	Hard	(Czech Republic) David Rikl	(The Bahamas) Mark Knowles (Canada) Daniel Nestor	3–6, 3–6
Runner-up	2006	Australian Open	Hard	(Czech Republic) Martin Damm	(United States) Bob Bryan (United States) Mike Bryan	6–4, 3–6, 4–6
Winner	2006	US Open	Hard	(Czech Republic) Martin Damm	(Sweden) Jonas Björkman (Belarus) Max Mirnyi	6–7^{(5–7)}, 6–4, 6–3
Runner-up	2008	US Open	Hard	(Czech Republic) Lukáš Dlouhý	(United States) Bob Bryan (United States) Mike Bryan	6–7^{(5–7)}, 6–7^{(10–12)}
Winner	2009	French Open (3)	Clay	(Czech Republic) Lukáš Dlouhý	(South Africa) Wesley Moodie (Belgium) Dick Norman	3–6, 6–3, 6–2
Winner	2009	US Open (2)	Hard	(Czech Republic) Lukáš Dlouhý	(India) Mahesh Bhupathi (The Bahamas) Mark Knowles	3–6, 6–3, 6–2
Runner-up	2010	French Open	Clay	(Czech Republic) Lukáš Dlouhý	(Serbia) Nenad Zimonjić (Canada) Daniel Nestor	5–7, 2–6
Runner-up	2011	Australian Open	Hard	(India) Mahesh Bhupathi	(United States) Bob Bryan (United States) Mike Bryan	3–6, 4–6
Winner	2012	Australian Open	Hard	(Czech Republic) Radek Štěpánek	(United States) Bob Bryan (United States) Mike Bryan	7–6^{(7–1)}, 6–2
Runner-up	2012	US Open	Hard	(Czech Republic) Radek Štěpánek	(United States) Bob Bryan (United States) Mike Bryan	3–6, 4–6
Winner	2013	US Open (3)	Hard	(Czech Republic) Radek Štěpánek	(Austria) Alexander Peya (Brazil) Bruno Soares	6–1, 6–3

==== Mixed doubles: 18 (10 titles, 8 runner-ups) ====
Outcome	Year	Championship	Surface	Partner	Opponents	Score
Winner	1999	Wimbledon	Grass	(United States) Lisa Raymond	(Russia) Anna Kournikova (Sweden) Jonas Björkman	6–4, 3–6, 6–3
Runner-up	2001	US Open	Hard	(United States) Lisa Raymond	(Australia) Rennae Stubbs (Australia) Todd Woodbridge	6–4, 5–7, [11–9]
Winner	2003	Australian Open	Hard	(United States) Martina Navratilova	(Greece) Eleni Daniilidou (Australia) Todd Woodbridge	6–4, 7–5
Winner	2003	Wimbledon (2)	Grass	(United States) Martina Navratilova	(Russia) Anastassia Rodionova (Israel) Andy Ram	6–3, 6–3
Runner-up	2004	Australian Open	Hard	(United States) Martina Navratilova	(Russia) Elena Bovina (Serbia and Montenegro) Nenad Zimonjić	6–1, 7–6
Runner-up	2005	French Open	Clay	(United States) Martina Navratilova	(Slovakia) Daniela Hantuchová (France) Fabrice Santoro	3–6, 6–3, 6–2
Runner-up	2007	US Open	Hard	(United States) Meghann Shaughnessy	(Belarus) Victoria Azarenka (Belarus) Max Mirnyi	6–4, 7–6^{(8–6)}
Winner	2008	US Open	Hard	(Zimbabwe) Cara Black	(United States) Liezel Huber (United Kingdom) Jamie Murray	7–6, 6–4
Runner-up	2009	Wimbledon	Grass	(Zimbabwe) Cara Black	(Germany) Anna-Lena Grönefeld (The Bahamas) Mark Knowles	7–5, 6–3
Runner-up	2009	US Open	Hard	(Zimbabwe) Cara Black	(United States) Carly Gullickson (United States) Travis Parrot	6–2, 6–4
Winner	2010	Australian Open (2)	Hard	(Zimbabwe) Cara Black	(Russia) Ekaterina Makarova (Czech Republic) Jaroslav Levinský	7–5, 6–3
Winner	2010	Wimbledon (3)	Grass	(Zimbabwe) Cara Black	(United States) Lisa Raymond (South Africa) Wesley Moodie	6–4, 7–6
Runner-up	2012	Australian Open	Hard	(Russia) Elena Vesnina	(United States) Bethanie Mattek-Sands (Romania) Horia Tecău	3–6, 7–5, [3–10]
Runner-up	2012	Wimbledon	Grass	(Russia) Elena Vesnina	(United States) Lisa Raymond (United States) Mike Bryan	3–6, 7–5, 4–6
Winner	2015	Australian Open (3)	Hard	(Switzerland) Martina Hingis	(France) Kristina Mladenovic (Canada) Daniel Nestor	6–4, 6–3
Winner	2015	Wimbledon (4)	Grass	(Switzerland) Martina Hingis	(Hungary) Tímea Babos (Austria) Alexander Peya	6–1, 6–1
Winner	2015	US Open (2)	Hard	(Switzerland) Martina Hingis	(United States) Bethanie Mattek-Sands (United States) Sam Querrey	6–4, 3–6, [10–7]
Winner	2016	French Open	Clay	(Switzerland) Martina Hingis	(India) Sania Mirza (Croatia) Ivan Dodig	4–6, 6–4, [10–8]

== Olympic medal matches ==
=== Singles: 1 (1 bronze medal) ===
Bronze medal final

Outcome	Year	Championship	Surface	Opponent	Score
Bronze	1996	(United States) Atlanta	Hard	(Brazil) Fernando Meligeni	3–6, 6–2, 6–4

=== Doubles: 1 ===
Outcome	Year	Championship	Surface	Partner	Opponents	Score
4th place	2004	Athens	Hard	(India) Mahesh Bhupathi	(Croatia) Mario Ančić (Croatia) Ivan Ljubičić	6–7^{(5–7)}, 6–4, 14–16

== ATP career finals ==
=== Singles: 1 (1 title) ===
Legend
Grand Slam (0–0)
Tennis Masters Cup (0–0)
ATP Masters Series (0–0)
ATP Tour (1–0)

Result	W–L	Date	Tournament	Surface	Opponent	Score
Win	1–0	Jul 1998	Newport, US	Grass	(South Africa) Neville Godwin	6–3, 6–2

=== Doubles: 98 (55 titles, 43 runners-up) ===
Legend
Grand Slam (8–8)
ATP World Tour Finals (0–4)
ATP World Tour Masters 1000 (13–5)
ATP World Tour 500 Series (6–10)
ATP World Tour 250 Series (28–16)

Result	W–L	Date	Tournament	Surface	Partner	Opponent	Score
Loss	0–1	Aug 1995	New Haven, US	Hard	(Venezuela) Nicolás Pereira	(United States) Rick Leach (United States) Scott Melville	3–6, 7–5, 4–6
Win	1–1	Apr 1997	Chennai, India	Hard	(India) Mahesh Bhupathi	(Uzbekistan) Oleg Ogorodov (Israel) Eyal Ran	7–6, 7–5
Win	2–1	Apr 1997	Prague, Czech Republic	Clay	(India) Mahesh Bhupathi	(Czech Republic) Petr Luxa (Czech Republic) David Škoch	6–1, 6–1
Win	3–1	Jul 1997	Montreal, Canada	Hard	(India) Mahesh Bhupathi	(Canada) Sébastien Lareau (United States) Alex O'Brien	7–6, 6–3
Win	4–1	Aug 1997	New Haven, US	Hard	(India) Mahesh Bhupathi	(Canada) Sébastien Lareau (United States) Alex O'Brien	6–4, 6–7, 6–2
Win	5–1	Sep 1997	Beijing, China	Hard (i)	(India) Mahesh Bhupathi	(United States) Alex O'Brien (United States) Jim Courier	7–5, 7–6
Win	6–1	Oct 1997	Singapore, Singapore	Carpet (i)	(India) Mahesh Bhupathi	(United States) Rick Leach (United States) Jonathan Stark	6–4, 6–4
Loss	6–2	Nov 1997	Hartford, US	Carpet	(India) Mahesh Bhupathi	(United States) Rick Leach (United States) Jonathan Stark	3–6, 4–6, 6–7
Win	7–2	Jan 1998	Doha, Qatar	Hard	(India) Mahesh Bhupathi	(France) Olivier Delaître (France) Fabrice Santoro	6–4, 3–6, 6–4
Win	8–2	Feb 1998	Dubai, UAE	Hard	(India) Mahesh Bhupathi	(United States) Donald Johnson (United States) Francisco Montana	6–2, 7–5
Win	9–2	Apr 1998	Chennai, India (2)	Hard	(India) Mahesh Bhupathi	(France) Olivier Delaître (Belarus) Max Mirnyi	6–7, 6–3, 6–2
Win	10–2	May 1998	Rome, Italy	Clay	(India) Mahesh Bhupathi	(South Africa) Ellis Ferreira (United States) Rick Leach	6–4, 4–6, 7–6
Win	11–2	Oct 1998	Shanghai, China	Carpet (i)	(India) Mahesh Bhupathi	(Australia) Todd Woodbridge (Australia) Mark Woodforde	6–4, 6–7, 7–6
Loss	11–3	Oct 1998	Singapore, Singapore	Carpet	(India) Mahesh Bhupathi	(Australia) Todd Woodbridge (Australia) Mark Woodforde	2–6, 3–6
Loss	11–4	Nov 1998	Stuttgart, Germany	Hard (i)	(India) Mahesh Bhupathi	(Canada) Sébastien Lareau (United States) Alex O'Brien	3–6, 6–3, 5–7
Win	12–4	Nov 1998	Paris, France	Carpet (i)	(India) Mahesh Bhupathi	(Netherlands) Jacco Eltingh (Netherlands) Paul Haarhuis	6–4, 6–2
Loss	12–5	Feb 1999	Melbourne, Australia	Hard	(India) Mahesh Bhupathi	(Sweden) Jonas Björkman (Australia) Patrick Rafter	3–6, 6–4, 4–6, 7–6, 4–6
Win	13–5	Apr 1999	Chennai, India (3)	Hard	(India) Mahesh Bhupathi	(Zimbabwe) Wayne Black (South Africa) Neville Godwin	4–6, 7–5, 6–4
Win	14–5	May 1999	Paris, France	Clay	(India) Mahesh Bhupathi	(Croatia) Goran Ivanišević (United States) Jeff Tarango	6–2, 7–5
Win	15–5	Jun 1999	's-Hertogenbosch, Netherlands	Grass	(Netherlands) Jan Siemerink	(South Africa) Ellis Ferreira (Czech Republic) David Rikl	W/O
Win	16–5	Jun 1999	London, UK	Grass	(India) Mahesh Bhupathi	(Netherlands) Paul Haarhuis (United States) Jared Palmer	6–7, 6–3, 6–4, 7–6
Win	17–5	Jul 1999	Newport, US	Grass	(Australia) Wayne Arthurs	(Armenia) Sargis Sargsian (United States) Chris Woodruff	6–7, 7–6, 6–3
Loss	17–6	Aug 1999	Indianapolis, US	Hard	(France) Olivier Delaître	(Netherlands) Paul Haarhuis (United States) Jared Palmer	3–6, 4–6
Loss	17–7	Sep 1999	New York, US	Hard	(India) Mahesh Bhupathi	(Canada) Sébastien Lareau (United States) Alex O'Brien	6–7, 4–6
Loss	17–8	Nov 1999	Hartford, US	Carpet	(India) Mahesh Bhupathi	(Canada) Sébastien Lareau (United States) Alex O'Brien	3–6, 2–6, 2–6
Win	18–8	May 2000	Orlando, US	Clay	(Netherlands) Jan Siemerink	(United States) Justin Gimelstob (Canada) Sébastien Lareau	6–3, 6–4
Win	19–8	Oct 2000	Tokyo, Japan	Hard	(India) Mahesh Bhupathi	(Australia) Michael Hill (United States) Jeff Tarango	6–4, 6–7, 6–3
Loss	19–9	Dec 2000	Bangalore, India	Hard	(India) Mahesh Bhupathi	(United States) Donald Johnson (South Africa) Piet Norval	6–7, 3–6, 4–6
Win	20–9	Apr 2001	Atlanta, US	Clay	(India) Mahesh Bhupathi	(United States) Rick Leach (Australia) David Macpherson	6–3, 7–6
Win	21–9	Apr 2001	Houston, US (2)	Clay	(India) Mahesh Bhupathi	(United States) Kevin Kim (United States) Jim Thomas	7–6, 6–2
Win	22–9	May 2001	Paris, France (2)	Clay	(India) Mahesh Bhupathi	(Czech Republic) Petr Pála (Czech Republic) Pavel Vízner	7–6, 6–3
Win	23–9	Aug 2001	Cincinnati, US	Hard	(India) Mahesh Bhupathi	(Czech Republic) Martin Damm (Germany) David Prinosil	7–6, 6–3
Loss	23–10	Oct 2001	Basel, Switzerland	Carpet	(India) Mahesh Bhupathi	(South Africa) Ellis Ferreira (United States) Rick Leach	6–7, 4–6
Loss	23–11	Nov 2001	Paris, France	Carpet	(India) Mahesh Bhupathi	(South Africa) Ellis Ferreira (United States) Rick Leach	6–3, 4–6, 3–6
Win	24–11	Dec 2001	Chennai, India (4)	Hard	(India) Mahesh Bhupathi	(Czech Republic) Tomáš Cibulec (Czech Republic) Ota Fukárek	5–7, 6–2, 7–5
Win	25–11	Apr 2002	Majorca, Spain	Clay	(India) Mahesh Bhupathi	(Austria) Julian Knowle (Germany) Michael Kohlmann	6–2, 6–4
Win	26–11	Feb 2003	Dubai, UAE (2)	Hard	(Czech Republic) David Rikl	(Zimbabwe) Wayne Black (Zimbabwe) Kevin Ullyett	6–3, 6–0
Win	27–11	Mar 2003	Delray Beach, US	Hard	(Serbia and Montenegro) Nenad Zimonjić	(Netherlands) Raemon Sluiter (Netherlands) Martin Verkerk	7–5, 3–6, 7–5
Loss	27–12	Apr 2003	Miami, US	Hard	(Czech Republic) David Rikl	(Switzerland) Roger Federer (Belarus) Max Mirnyi	5–7, 3–6
Loss	27–13	Jun 2003	s'Hertogenbosch, Netherlands	Grass	(United States) Donald Johnson	(Czech Republic) Martin Damm (Czech Republic) Cyril Suk	5–7, 6–7
Win	28–13	Jul 2003	Gstaad, Switzerland	Clay	(Czech Republic) David Rikl	(Czech Republic) František Čermák (Czech Republic) Leoš Friedl	6–3, 6–3
Loss	28–14	Feb 2004	Dubai, UAE (3)	Hard	(Sweden) Jonas Björkman	(India) Mahesh Bhupathi (France) Fabrice Santoro	2–6, 6–4, 4–6
Win	29–14	Jun 2004	Halle, Germany	Grass	(Czech Republic) David Rikl	(Czech Republic) Tomáš Cibulec (Czech Republic) Petr Pála	6–2, 7–5
Win	30–14	Jul 2004	Gstaad, Switzerland (2)	Clay	(Czech Republic) David Rikl	(Switzerland) Marc Rosset (Switzerland) Stanislas Wawrinka	6–4, 6–2
Win	31–14	Jul 2004	Toronto, Canada (2)	Hard	(India) Mahesh Bhupathi	(Sweden) Jonas Björkman (Belarus) Max Mirnyi	6–4, 6–2
Loss	31–15	Sep 2004	New York, US	Hard	(Czech Republic) David Rikl	(The Bahamas) Mark Knowles (Canada) Daniel Nestor	3–6, 3–6
Win	32–15	Sep 2004	Delray Beach, US (2)	Hard	(Czech Republic) Radek Štěpánek	(Argentina) Gastón Etlis (Argentina) Martín Rodríguez	6–0, 6–3
Win	33–15	Apr 2005	Monte Carlo, Monaco	Clay	(Serbia and Montenegro) Nenad Zimonjić	(United States) Bob Bryan (United States) Mike Bryan	W/O
Win	34–15	Apr 2005	Barcelona, Spain	Clay	(Serbia and Montenegro) Nenad Zimonjić	(Spain) Feliciano López (Spain) Rafael Nadal	6–3, 6–3
Win	35–15	Sep 2005	Bangkok, Thailand	Hard (i)	(Australia) Paul Hanley	(Israel) Jonathan Erlich (Israel) Andy Ram	6–7, 6–1, 6–2
Loss	35–16	Oct 2005	Stockholm, Sweden	Hard (i)	(Serbia and Montenegro) Nenad Zimonjić	(Australia) Wayne Arthurs (Australia) Paul Hanley	3–6, 3–6
Loss	35–17	Oct 2005	Madrid, Spain	Hard (i)	(Serbia and Montenegro) Nenad Zimonjić	(The Bahamas) Mark Knowles (Canada) Daniel Nestor	6–3, 3–6, 2–6
Loss	35–18	Nov 2005	Shanghai, China	Carpet (i)	(Serbia and Montenegro) Nenad Zimonjić	(France) Michaël Llodra (France) Fabrice Santoro	7–6^{(8–6)}, 3–6, 6–7^{(4–7)}
Loss	35–19	Jan 2006	Melbourne, Australia	Hard	(Czech Republic) Martin Damm	(United States) Bob Bryan (United States) Mike Bryan	6–4, 3–6, 4–6
Win	36–19	Jun 2006	's-Hertogenbosch, Netherlands (2)	Grass	(Czech Republic) Martin Damm	(France) Arnaud Clément (South Africa) Chris Haggard	6–1, 7–6
Win	37–19	Aug 2006	New York, US	Hard	(Czech Republic) Martin Damm	(Sweden) Jonas Björkman (Belarus) Max Mirnyi	6–7, 6–4, 6–3
Loss	37–20	Jan 2007	Doha, Qatar	Hard	(Czech Republic) Martin Damm	(Russia) Mikhail Youzhny (Serbia) Nenad Zimonjić	1–6, 6–7
Win	38–20	Feb 2007	Rotterdam, Netherlands	Hard (i)	(Czech Republic) Martin Damm	(Romania) Andrei Pavel (Germany) Alexander Waske	6–3, 6–7, [10–7]
Win	39–20	Mar 2007	Indian Wells, US	Hard	(Czech Republic) Martin Damm	(Israel) Jonathan Erlich (Israel) Andy Ram	6–4, 6–4
Loss	39–21	Apr 2007	Miami, US	Hard	(Czech Republic) Martin Damm	(United States) Bob Bryan (United States) Mike Bryan	6–7, 6–3, [7–10]
Loss	39–22	Jun 2007	's-Hertogenbosch, Netherlands	Grass	(Czech Republic) Martin Damm	(South Africa) Jeff Coetzee (Netherlands) Rogier Wassen	6–3, 6–7, [10–12]
Loss	39–23	Jun 2008	Halle, Germany	Grass	(Czech Republic) Lukáš Dlouhý	(Russia) Mikhail Youzhny (Germany) Mischa Zverev	6–3, 4–6, [3–10]
Loss	39–24	Jun 2008	s'Hertogenbosch, Netherlands	Grass	(India) Mahesh Bhupathi	(Croatia) Mario Ančić (Austria) Jürgen Melzer	6–7, 3–6
Loss	39–25	Aug 2008	New York, US	Hard	(Czech Republic) Lukáš Dlouhý	(United States) Bob Bryan (United States) Mike Bryan	6–7^{(5–7)}, 6–7^{(10–12)}
Win	40–25	Sep 2008	Bangkok, Thailand (2)	Hard (i)	(Czech Republic) Lukáš Dlouhý	(United States) Scott Lipsky (United States) David Martin	6–4, 7–6^{(7–4)}
Loss	40–26	Sep 2008	Tokyo, Japan	Hard	(Czech Republic) Lukáš Dlouhý	(Russia) Mikhail Youzhny (Germany) Mischa Zverev	3–6, 4–6
Loss	40–27	Jan 2009	Auckland, New Zealand	Hard	(United States) Scott Lipsky	(Czech Republic) Martin Damm (Sweden) Robert Lindstedt	5–7, 4–6
Loss	40–28	Feb 2009	Rotterdam, Netherlands	Hard	(Czech Republic) Lukáš Dlouhý	(Canada) Daniel Nestor (Serbia) Nenad Zimonjić	2–6, 5–7
Win	41–28	Jun 2009	Paris, France (3)	Clay	(Czech Republic) Lukáš Dlouhý	(South Africa) Wesley Moodie (Belgium) Dick Norman	3–6, 6–3, 6–2
Win	42–28	Sep 2009	New York, US (2)	Hard	(Czech Republic) Lukáš Dlouhý	(India) Mahesh Bhupathi (The Bahamas) Mark Knowles	3–6, 6–3, 6–2
Loss	42–29	Jan 2010	Brisbane, Australia	Hard	(Czech Republic) Lukáš Dlouhý	(France) Jérémy Chardy (France) Marc Gicquel	3–6, 6–7^{(5–7)}
Loss	42–30	Feb 2010	Dubai, UAE	Hard	(Czech Republic) Lukáš Dlouhý	(Sweden) Simon Aspelin (Australia) Paul Hanley	2–6, 3–6
Win	43–30	Apr 2010	Miami, US	Hard	(Czech Republic) Lukáš Dlouhý	(India) Mahesh Bhupathi (Belarus) Max Mirnyi	6–2, 7–5
Loss	43–31	Jun 2010	Paris, France	Clay	(Czech Republic) Lukáš Dlouhý	(Canada) Daniel Nestor (Serbia) Nenad Zimonjić	5–7, 2–6
Loss	43–32	Jun 2010	s'Hertogenbosch, Netherlands	Grass	(Czech Republic) Lukáš Dlouhý	(Sweden) Robert Lindstedt (Romania) Horia Tecău	6–1, 5–7, [7–10]
Win	44–32	Oct 2010	Shanghai, China	Hard	(Austria) Jürgen Melzer	(Poland) Mariusz Fyrstenberg (Poland) Marcin Matkowski	7–5, 4–6, [10–5]
Win	45–32	Jan 2011	Chennai, India (5)	Hard	(India) Mahesh Bhupathi	(Netherlands) Robin Haase (United States) David Martin	6–2, 6–7^{(3–7)}, [10–7]
Loss	45–33	Jan 2011	Melbourne, Australia	Hard	(India) Mahesh Bhupathi	(United States) Bob Bryan (United States) Mike Bryan	3–6, 4–6
Win	46–33	Apr 2011	Miami, US (2)	Hard	(India) Mahesh Bhupathi	(Belarus) Max Mirnyi (Canada) Daniel Nestor	6–7^{(5–7)}, 6–2, [10–5]
Loss	46–34	Jun 2011	London, UK	Grass	(India) Mahesh Bhupathi	(United States) Bob Bryan (United States) Mike Bryan	7–6^{(7–2)}, 6–7^{(4–7)}, [6–10]
Win	47–34	Aug 2011	Cincinnati, US	Hard	(India) Mahesh Bhupathi	(France) Michaël Llodra (Serbia) Nenad Zimonjić	7–6^{(7–4)}, 7–6^{(7–2)}
Win	48–34	Jan 2012	Chennai, India (6)	Hard	(Serbia) Janko Tipsarević	(Israel) Andy Ram (Israel) Jonathan Erlich	6–4, 6–4
Win	49–34	Jan 2012	Melbourne, Australia	Hard	(Czech Republic) Radek Štěpánek	(United States) Bob Bryan (United States) Mike Bryan	7–6^{(7–1)}, 6–2
Win	50–34	Mar 2012	Miami, US (3)	Hard	(Czech Republic) Radek Štěpánek	(Belarus) Max Mirnyi (Canada) Daniel Nestor	3–6, 6–1, [10–8]
Loss	50–35	Sep 2012	New York, US	Hard	(Czech Republic) Radek Štěpánek	(United States) Bob Bryan (United States) Mike Bryan	3–6, 4–6
Loss	50–36	Oct 2012	Tokyo, Japan	Hard	(Czech Republic) Radek Štěpánek	(Austria) Alexander Peya (Brazil) Bruno Soares	3–6, 6–7^{(5–7)}
Win	51–36	Oct 2012	Shanghai, China (2)	Hard	(Czech Republic) Radek Štěpánek	(India) Mahesh Bhupathi (India) Rohan Bopanna	6–7^{(7–9)}, 6–3, [10–5]
Win	52–36	Aug 2013	Winston-Salem, US	Hard	(Canada) Daniel Nestor	(Philippines) Treat Huey (United Kingdom) Dominic Inglot	7–6^{(12–10)}, 7–5
Win	53–36	Sep 2013	New York, US	Hard	(Czech Republic) Radek Štěpánek	(Austria) Alexander Peya (Brazil) Bruno Soares	6–1, 6–3
Loss	53–37	Aug 2014	Washington, D.C., United States	Hard	(Australia) Samuel Groth	(Netherlands) Jean-Julien Rojer (Romania) Horia Tecău	5–7, 4–6
Win	54–37	Sep 2014	Kuala Lumpur, Malaysia	Hard (i)	(Poland) Marcin Matkowski	(United Kingdom) Jamie Murray (Australia) John Peers	3–6, 7–6^{(7–5)}, [10–5]
Loss	54–38	Jan 2015	Chennai, India	Hard	(South Africa) Raven Klaasen	(Chinese Taipei) Lu Yen-hsun (United Kingdom) Jonathan Marray	3–6, 6–7^{(4–7)}
Win	55–38	Jan 2015	Auckland, New Zealand	Hard	(South Africa) Raven Klaasen	(United Kingdom) Dominic Inglot (Romania) Florin Mergea	7–6^{(7–1)}, 6–4
Loss	55–39	Feb 2015	Delray Beach, US	Hard	(South Africa) Raven Klaasen	(United States) Bob Bryan (United States) Mike Bryan	3–6, 6–3, [6–10]
Loss	55–40	Aug 2016	Winston-Salem, US	Hard	(Germany) Andre Begemann	(Spain) Guillermo García López (Finland) Henri Kontinen	6–4, 6–7^{(6–8)}, [8–10]
Loss	55–41	Sep 2016	St. Petersburg, Russia	Hard (i)	(Germany) Andre Begemann	(United Kingdom) Dominic Inglot (Finland) Henri Kontinen	6–4, 3–6, [10–12]
Loss	55–42	Mar 2018	Dubai, UAE	Hard	(United States) James Cerretani	(Netherlands) Jean-Julien Rojer (Romania) Horia Tecău	2–6, 6–7^{(2–7)}
Loss	55–43	Aug 2018	Winston-Salem, US	Hard	(United States) James Cerretani	(Netherlands) Jean-Julien Rojer (Romania) Horia Tecău	4–6, 2–6

== ATP Challenger and ITF Futures finals ==
=== Singles: 14 (11 titles, 3 runner-ups) ===
Legend ATP Challenger (11–3) ITF Futures (0–0)	Finals by surface Hard (7–3) Clay (0–0) Grass (4–0) Carpet (0–0)

Result	W–L	Date	Tournament	Tier	Surface	Opponent	Score
Win	1–0	Dec 1992	Guangzhou, China	Challenger	Hard	(United States) Richard Matuszewski	6–3, 6–3
Loss	1–1	Apr 1994	Nagoya, Japan	Challenger	Hard	(Belgium) Christophe Van Garsse	4–6, 3–6
Win	2–1	May 1994	Bombay, India	Challenger	Hard	(Netherlands) Joost Winnink	6–7, 6–3, 6–1
Win	3–1	Aug 1994	Binghamton, USA	Challenger	Hard	(United States) David Witt	6–4, 6–2
Loss	3–2	May 1995	Bombay, India	Challenger	Hard	(Zimbabwe) Byron Black	3–6, 4–6
Win	4–2	Aug 1995	Brasília, Brazil	Challenger	Hard	(Brazil) Roberto Jabali	6–1, 5–7, 6–2
Loss	4–3	Sep 1996	Madras, India	Challenger	Hard	(Uzbekistan) Oleg Ogorodov	6–7, 3–6
Win	5–3	Nov 1996	Vacoas-Phoenix, Mauritius	Challenger	Grass	(France) Fabrice Santoro	7–5, 6–4
Win	6–3	Mar 1998	Bangkok, Thailand	Challenger	Hard	(Japan) Gouichi Motomura	6–4, 7–5
Win	7–3	Feb 1999	Calcutta, India	Challenger	Grass	(India) Mahesh Bhupathi	4–6, 6–4, 6–3
Win	8–3	Apr 1999	New Delhi, India	Challenger	Hard	(India) Mahesh Bhupathi	7–5, 6–4
Win	9–3	Dec 1999	Lucknow, India	Challenger	Grass	(United Kingdom) Jamie Delgado	7–6^{(7–5)}, 7–6^{(7–5)}
Win	10–3	Dec 1999	Jaipur, India	Challenger	Grass	(United Kingdom) Barry Cowan	7–6^{(10–8)}, 6–4
Win	11–3	Mar 2000	Bombay, India	Challenger	Hard	(Netherlands) Dennis van Scheppingen	7–6^{(7–2)}, 3–2 ret.

=== Doubles: 44 (26 titles, 18 runner-ups) ===
Legend ATP Challenger (26–18) ITF Futures (0–0)	Finals by surface Hard (17–14) Clay (7–1) Grass (1–2) Carpet (1–1)

Result	W–L	Date	Tournament	Tier	Surface	Partner	Opponents	Score
Loss	0–1	Apr 1992	Nagoya, Japan	Challenger	Hard	(Haiti) Bertrand Madsen	(United Kingdom) Jeremy Bates (United Kingdom) Mark Petchey	5–7, 6–3, 6–7
Win	1–1	Aug 1992	New Haven, USA	Challenger	Hard	(United States) Todd Nelson	(United Kingdom) Jeremy Bates (Zimbabwe) Byron Black	7–5, 2–6, 7–6
Win	2–1	Dec 1992	Hong Kong, Hong Kong	Challenger	Hard	(United States) Donald Johnson	(United States) Richard Matuszewski (United States) John Sullivan	6–2, 7–6
Win	3–1	Jan 1993	Bangalore, India	Challenger	Clay	(United States) Donald Johnson	(United Kingdom) Sean Cole (Russia) Andrei Merinov	6–4, 6–3
Win	4–1	Feb 1993	Wolfsburg, Germany	Challenger	Carpet (i)	(United States) Donald Johnson	(Sweden) Jan Apell (Denmark) Michael Mortensen	7–6, 6–1
Loss	4–2	Aug 1993	Cincinnati, USA	Challenger	Hard	(Australia) Wayne Arthurs	(South Africa) Johan de Beer (South Africa) Kevin Ullyett	6–7, 4–6
Loss	4–3	Feb 1994	Rennes, France	Challenger	Carpet (i)	(The Bahamas) Mark Knowles	(Sweden) Anders Järryd (Norway) Bent-Ove Pedersen	4–6, 3–6
Win	5–3	May 1994	Manila, Philippines	Challenger	Hard	(Canada) Albert Chang	(United States) Richard Matuszewski (South Africa) David Nainkin	6–4, 6–4
Loss	5–4	Oct 1994	Jakarta, Indonesia	Challenger	Hard	(India) Mahesh Bhupathi	(United Kingdom) Andrew Foster (United Kingdom) Danny Sapsford	w/o
Win	6–4	Apr 1995	Nagoya, Japan	Challenger	Hard	(South Africa) Kevin Ullyett	(Australia) Joshua Eagle (Australia) Andrew Kratzmann	7–6, 7–5
Loss	6–5	Jun 1995	Medellín, Colombia	Challenger	Clay	(Venezuela) Maurice Ruah	(Zimbabwe) Wayne Black (Hungary) László Markovits	5–7, 4–6
Win	7–5	Jun 1995	Bogotá, Colombia	Challenger	Clay	(Mexico) Óscar Ortiz	(Chile) Sergio Cortés (Portugal) João Cunha Silva	7–6, 7–6
Win	8–5	Sep 1995	Aruba, Aruba	Challenger	Hard	(India) Mahesh Bhupathi	(Spain) José Antonio Conde (South Africa) Christo van Rensburg	6–4, 4–6, 7–6
Win	9–5	Apr 1996	Fergana, Uzbekistan	Challenger	Hard	(India) Mahesh Bhupathi	(United States) Geoff Grant (Venezuela) Maurice Ruah	6–3, 7–6
Loss	9–6	May 1996	Andijan, Uzbekistan	Challenger	Hard	(India) Mahesh Bhupathi	(United States) Geoff Grant (Venezuela) Maurice Ruah	4–6, 3–6
Win	10–6	May 1996	Jerusalem, Israel	Challenger	Hard	(South Africa) Neville Godwin	(Israel) Noam Behr (Israel) Eyal Ran	7–6, 7–5
Loss	10–7	Jun 1996	Annenheim, Austria	Challenger	Grass	(India) Mahesh Bhupathi	(Australia) Sandon Stolle (Australia) Michael Tebbutt	2–6, 4–6
Win	11–7	Sep 1996	Aruba, Aruba	Challenger	Hard	(India) Mahesh Bhupathi	(Canada) Sébastien Leblanc (South Africa) Grant Stafford	6–2, 6–2
Win	12–7	Sep 1996	Madras, India	Challenger	Hard	(India) Mahesh Bhupathi	(Netherlands) Sander Groen (Uzbekistan) Oleg Ogorodov	7–5, 6–1
Win	13–7	Nov 1996	Ahmedabad, India	Challenger	Clay	(India) Mahesh Bhupathi	(Austria) Georg Blumauer (Austria) Udo Plamberger	6–3, 3–6, 6–3
Loss	13–8	Nov 1996	Reunion Island, Reunion	Challenger	Hard	(United States) Donald Johnson	(Netherlands) Hendrik Jan Davids (France) Fabrice Santoro	3–6, 6–7
Win	14–8	Jan 1997	Singapore, Singapore	Challenger	Hard (i)	(India) Mahesh Bhupathi	(United States) Michael Joyce (United States) Scott Melville	6–4, 4–6, 7–6
Win	15–8	Apr 1997	Prague, Czech Republic	Challenger	Clay	(India) Mahesh Bhupathi	(United States) Devin Bowen (Finland) Tuomas Ketola	6–4, 6–0
Win	16–8	May 1997	Jerusalem, Israel	Challenger	Hard	(India) Mahesh Bhupathi	(Zimbabwe) Wayne Black (South Africa) Kevin Ullyett	6–7, 6–2, 7–6
Win	17–8	Apr 2000	Bermuda, Bermuda	Challenger	Clay	(Netherlands) Jan Siemerink	(South Africa) Jeff Coetzee (South Africa) Brent Haygarth	6–3, 6–2
Loss	17–9	Mar 2010	Sunrise, USA	Challenger	Hard	(Czech Republic) Lukáš Dlouhý	(Czech Republic) Martin Damm (Slovakia) Filip Polášek	6–4, 1–6, [11–13]
Loss	17–10	Apr 2016	León, Mexico	Challenger	Hard	(Australia) Sam Groth	(Mexico) Santiago González (Croatia) Mate Pavić	4–6, 6–3, [11–13]
Win	18–10	May 2016	Busan, South Korea	Challenger	Hard	(Australia) Sam Groth	(Thailand) Sanchai Ratiwatana (Thailand) Sonchat Ratiwatana	4–6, 6–1, [10–7]
Win	19–10	Jul 2016	Biella, Italy	Challenger	Clay	(Germany) Andre Begemann	(Slovakia) Andrej Martin (Chile) Hans Podlipnik Castillo	6–4, 6–4
Loss	19–11	Oct 2016	Tashkent, Uzbekistan	Challenger	Hard	(Germany) Andre Begemann	(Russia) Mikhail Elgin (Uzbekistan) Denis Istomin	4–6, 2–6
Win	20–11	Apr 2017	León, Mexico	Challenger	Hard	(Canada) Adil Shamasdin	(Switzerland) Luca Margaroli (Brazil) Caio Zampieri	6–1, 6–4
Win	21–11	Apr 2017	Tallahassee, USA	Challenger	Clay	(United States) Scott Lipsky	(Argentina) Máximo González (Argentina) Leonardo Mayer	4–6, 7–6^{(7–5)}, [10–7]
Win	22–11	Jun 2017	Ilkley, Great Britain	Challenger	Grass	(Canada) Adil Shamasdin	(United Kingdom) Brydan Klein (United Kingdom) Joe Salisbury	6–2, 2–6, [10–8]
Win	23–11	Nov 2017	Knoxville, USA	Challenger	Hard (i)	(India) Purav Raja	(United States) James Cerretani (Australia) John-Patrick Smith	7–6^{(7–4)}, 7–6^{(7–4)}
Win	24–11	Nov 2017	Champaign, USA	Challenger	Hard (i)	(India) Purav Raja	(South Africa) Ruan Roelofse (United Kingdom) Joe Salisbury	6–3, 6–7^{(5–7)}, [10–5]
Win	25–11	Jan 2018	Newport Beach, USA	Challenger	Hard	(United States) James Cerretani	(Philippines) Treat Huey (United States) Denis Kudla	6–4, 7–5
Loss	25–12	Feb 2018	Dallas, USA	Challenger	Hard (i)	(United Kingdom) Joe Salisbury	(India) Jeevan Nedunchezhiyan (Indonesia) Christopher Rungkat	4–6, 6–3, [7–10]
Loss	25–13	Sep 2018	Chicago, USA	Challenger	Hard	(Mexico) Miguel Ángel Reyes-Varela	(United Kingdom) Luke Bambridge (United Kingdom) Neal Skupski	3–6, 4–6
Loss	25–14	Oct 2018	Monterrey, Mexico	Challenger	Hard	(Mexico) Miguel Ángel Reyes-Varela	(El Salvador) Marcelo Arévalo (India) Jeevan Nedunchezhiyan	1–6, 4–6
Win	26–14	Oct 2018	Santo Domingo, Dominican Republic	Challenger	Hard	(Mexico) Miguel Ángel Reyes-Varela	(Uruguay) Ariel Behar (Ecuador) Roberto Quiroz	4–6, 6–3, [10–5]
Loss	26–15	Oct 2018	Brest, France	Challenger	Hard (i)	(Mexico) Miguel Ángel Reyes-Varela	(Belgium) Sander Gillé (Belgium) Joran Vliegen	6–3, 4–6, [2–10]
Loss	26–16	Jan 2019	Da Nang, Vietnam	Challenger	Hard	(Mexico) Miguel Ángel Reyes-Varela	(Chinese Taipei) Hsieh Cheng-peng (Indonesia) Christopher Rungkat	3–6, 6–2, [9–11]
Loss	26–17	Jun 2019	Ilkley, UK	Challenger	Grass	(New Zealand) Marcus Daniell	(Mexico) Santiago González (Pakistan) Aisam-ul-Haq Qureshi	3–6, 4–6
Loss	26–18	Feb 2020	Bangalore, India	Challenger	Hard	(Australia) Matthew Ebden	(India) Purav Raja (India) Ramkumar Ramanathan	0–6, 3–6

== ATP ranking ==
=== Doubles ===
Year	1990	1991	1992	1993	1994	1995	1996	1997	1998	1999	2000	2001	2002	2003	2004	2005	2006	2007	2008	2009	2010	2011	2012	2013	2014	2015	2016	2017	2018	2019	2020
High	722T	662	515	309	203	210	277	107	66	43	61	13	9	8	3	13	9	8	14	18	32	36	37	17	3	1	15				
Low	1066T	865	864	546	376	676	734	277	173	81	100	88	19	15	13	35	30	28	28	39	50	42	49	44	20	15	53				
Year End	722T	740	517	317	212	664	307	114	73	67	83	16	11	12	13	30	9	28	18	37	38	39	43	19	3	15					

=== Weeks statistics ===
Weeks at	Total weeks	Consecutive
No. 1	39	39
No. 2	4	2
No. 3	28	15
Top 5	132	74
Top 10	509	143
Top 20	781	322
Top 30	870	601
Top 40	905	752
Top 50	994	764
Top 100	1,299	995

* Source:

== Grand Slam seedings ==
The tournaments won by Paes are in boldface, and advances into finals by Paes are in italics.

=== Men's doubles ===
Legend (slams won / times seeded) seeded No. 1 (**2** / 5) seeded No. 2 (0 / 2) seeded No. 3 (**1** / 13) seeded No. 4–10 (**3** / 37) Seeded outside the top 10 (0 / 6) not seeded (**2** / 30)	Longest / total: 5 / 94; 1 / 94; 7 / 94; 8 / 94; 2 / 94; 5 / 94

Year	Australian Open	French Open	Wimbledon	US Open
1992	did not play	did not play	did not qualify	did not play
1993	did not play	did not play	qualifier	not seeded
1994	not seeded	did not play	not seeded	not seeded
1995	not seeded	did not play	did not play	not seeded
1996	did not play	did not play	not seeded	did not qualify
1997	not seeded	not seeded	not seeded	10th
1998	2nd	3rd	3rd	4th
1999	1st (1)	**1st (1)**	**1st (2)**	1st (2)
2000	1st	not seeded	did not play	not seeded
2001	not seeded	**not seeded (3)**	6th	5th
2002	3rd	14th	not seeded	13th
2003	9th	5th	5th	did not play
2004	10th	10th	11th	14th (3)
2005	did not play	6th	5th	5th
2006	7th (4)	7th	7th	**6th (4)**
2007	5th	3rd	5th	4th
2008	5th	9th	9th	7th (5)
2009	4th	**3rd (5)**	3rd	**4th (6)**
2010	3rd	3rd (6)	3rd	3rd
2011	3rd (7)	3rd	3rd	4th
2012	**not seeded (7)**	7th	4th	5th (8)
2013	2nd	9th	4th	**4th (8)**
2014	5th	did not play	5th	6th
2015	10th	10th	11th	not seeded
2016	not seeded	16th	not seeded	protected ranking
2017	not seeded	not seeded	not seeded	not seeded
2018	not seeded	did not play	did not play	not seeded
2019	not seeded	not seeded	not seeded	not seeded

=== Mixed doubles ===
Legend (slams won / times seeded) seeded No. 1 (**2** / 8) seeded No. 2 (**1** / 9) seeded No. 3 (0 / 3) seeded No. 4–10 (**5** / 27) Seeded outside the top 10 (0 / 3) not seeded (**2** / 30)	Longest / total: 3 / 81; 3 / 81; 1 / 81; 4 / 81; 1 / 81; 3 / 81

Year	Australian Open	French Open	Wimbledon	US Open
1994	did not play	did not play	not seeded	did not play
1995	did not play	did not play	did not play	not seeded
1996	did not play	did not play	not seeded	did not play
1997	did not play	not seeded	not seeded	not seeded
1998	did not play	1st	1st	not seeded
1999	6th	1st	**1st (1)**	1st
2000	2nd	2nd	did not play	not seeded
2001	not seeded	not seeded	6th	2nd (1)
2002	not seeded	4th	5th	not seeded
2003	**wild card (2)**	7th	**5th (3)**	did not play
2004	4th (2)	6th	9th	8th
2005	did not play	6th (3)	did not play	7th
2006	not seeded	not seeded	4th	3rd
2007	3rd	not seeded	8th	not seeded (4)
2008	not seeded	not seeded	10th	**5th (4)**
2009	1st	2nd	1st (5)	2nd (6)
2010	**1st (5)**	2nd	**2nd (6)**	2nd
2011	4th	7th	14th	7th
2012	5th (7)	5th	4th (8)	3rd
2013	2nd	not seeded	15th	did not play
2014	not seeded	did not play	4th	did not play
2015	**7th (7)**	8th	**7th (8)**	**4th (9)**
2016	not seeded	**not seeded (10)**	16th	wild card
2017	wild card	not seeded	not seeded	did not play
2018	did not play			
2019	wild card	did not play	not seeded	did not play
2020	wild card	tournament cancelled		

== Partnerships ==
Leander Paes is known for changing partnerships, and he has had over 100 different partners over his career. Paes teamed with 25 players in Grand Slam mixed doubles.

=== Partners in men's doubles ===
No.	Partner	Year
1	(India) Zeeshan Ali	1990
2	(India) Ramesh Krishnan	1991–1993
3	(Puerto Rico) Juan Rios	1991
4	(Australia) Charlton Eagle	1991
5	(Canada) Andrew Sznajder	1992
6	(Haiti) Bertrand Madsen	1992
7	(Italy) Nicola Bruno	1992
8	(Zimbabwe) Kevin Ullyett	1992, 1995, 1997
9	(Sweden) Nicklas Utgren	1992
10	(United States) Todd Nelson	1992, 1993
11	(Israel) Gilad Bloom	1992, 1994
12	(United States) Donald Johnson	1992–1994, 1996, 2003
13	(United States) Tommy Ho	1993
14	(Georgia (country)) Vladimir Gabrichidze	1993
15	(Germany) Arne Thoms	1993
16	(Zimbabwe) Byron Black	1993, 2000
17	(Italy) Laurence Tieleman	1993, 1995
18	(Netherlands) Fernon Wibier	1993
19	(Mexico) Oliver Fernández	1993
20	(France) Jean-Philippe Fleurian	1993
21	(Australia) Wayne Arthurs	1993, 1999–2000
22	(Canada) Sébastien Lareau	1993–1994, 2000
23	(South Africa) Stefan Kruger	1993
24	(South Africa) Ellis Ferreira	1993
25	(South Africa) Johan de Beer	1993
26	(Japan) Shuzo Matsuoka	1993
27	(Sweden) Mårten Renström	1994
28	(The Bahamas) Mark Knowles	1994
29	(India) Gaurav Natekar	1994–1995
30	(South Africa) Marius Barnard	1994
31	(Canada) Albert Chang	1994
32	(Netherlands) Stephen Noteboom	1994
33	(Canada) Daniel Nestor	1994, 2013, 2015
34	(United States) Richard Matuszewski	1994
35	(South Africa) Mark Kaplan	1994
36	(India) Mahesh Bhupathi	1994–2006, 2008–2011
37	(Malaysia) Adam Malik	1994
38	(Zimbabwe) Wayne Black	1995–1996
39	(Sweden) Lars-Anders Wahlgren	1995
40	(United States) Kent Kinnear	1995
41	(United States) Matt Lucena	1995
42	(South Africa) Clinton Ferreira	1995
43	(Israel) Eyal Ran	1995
44	(Venezuela) Maurice Ruah	1995
45	(Mexico) Óscar Ortiz	1995
46	(Venezuela) Nicolás Pereira	1995–1996
47	(South Africa) David Adams	1995
48	(United States) Devin Bowen	1996
49	(United States) Jeff Belloli	1996
50	(South Africa) Neville Godwin	1996
51	(United States) David DiLucia	1996
52	(South Africa) Chris Haggard	1996, 2000
53	(South Africa) Marcos Ondruska	1997
54	(The Bahamas) Roger Smith	1997
55	(United States) Mark Keil	1997
56	(India) Nitin Kirtane	1997
57	(South Africa) Piet Norval	1998
58	(Australia) Peter Tramacchi	1998
59	(Netherlands) Jan Siemerink	1999, 2000
60	(Sweden) Jonas Björkman	1999, 2004
61	(United States) Jared Palmer	1999
62	(France) Olivier Delaître	1999
63	(India) Fazaluddin Syed	2000
64	(Ecuador) Nicolás Lapentti	2000
65	(India) Vishal Uppal	2000, 2002
66	(India) Mustafa Ghouse	2001
67	(South Africa) John-Laffnie de Jager	2002
68	(United States) Justin Gimelstob	2002
69	(Czech Republic) Tomáš Cibulec	2002, 2004
70	(France) Michaël Llodra	2002, 2013
71	(Australia) Stephen Huss	2002
72	(Australia) Michael Hill	2002
73	(Czech Republic) David Rikl	2002–2004
74	(Serbia and Montenegro) Nenad Zimonjić	2003, 2005
75	(Israel) Jonathan Erlich	2004
76	(Czech Republic) Radek Štěpánek	2004, 2006, 2012–2015
77	(Australia) Paul Hanley	2005, 2007–2008
78	(Czech Republic) Martin Damm	2006–2007
79	(Pakistan) Aisam-ul-Haq Qureshi	2006, 2014
80	(India) Sunil-Kumar Sipaeya	2007
81	(India) Rohan Bopanna	2007, 2012, 2014–2016, 2018, 2020
82	(Spain) Tommy Robredo	2008
83	(Czech Republic) Lukáš Dlouhý	2008–2010
84	(United States) Scott Lipsky	2009, 2012
85	(Austria) Jürgen Melzer	2010, 2012–2013
86	(Serbia) Janko Tipsarević	2012
87	(Austria) Alexander Peya	2012
88	(South Africa) Kevin Anderson	2012
89	(India) Vishnu Vardhan	2012, 2017
90	(Romania) Horia Tecău	2012
91	(France) Édouard Roger-Vasselin	2013
92	(India) Purav Raja	2013, 2017–2018
93	(India) Sanam Singh	2013
94	(Italy) Daniele Bracciali	2013
95	(Australia) Sam Groth	2014
96	(Spain) David Marrero	2014
97	(Poland) Marcin Matkowski	2014
98	(Switzerland) Stan Wawrinka	2014
99	(South Africa) Raven Klaasen	2015
100	(Spain) Marcel Granollers	2015
101	(United Kingdom) Andy Murray	2015
102	(Spain) Fernando Verdasco	2015
103	(Bulgaria) Grigor Dimitrov	2015
104	(Australia) John Peers	2015
105	(Poland) Łukasz Kubot	2015
106	(Spain) Rafael Nadal	2015
107	(France) Jérémy Chardy	2016
108	(Germany) Andre Begemann	2016
109	(India) Saketh Myneni	2016
110	(India) Ramkumar Ramanathan	2016
111	(Brazil) André Sá	2017
112	(Spain) Guillermo García López	2017
113	(Chinese Taipei) Yen-Hsun Lu	2017
114	(Argentina) Juan Martín del Potro	2017
115	(Germany) Dustin Brown	2017
116	(Canada) Adil Shamasdin	2017
117	(Croatia) Antonio Šančić	2017
118	(Germany) Alexander Zverev	2017
119	(United States) James Cerretani	2018
120	(United Kingdom) Joe Salisbury	2018
121	(Mexico) Miguel Ángel Reyes-Varela	2018
122	(France) Benoît Paire	2019
123	(Austria) Philipp Oswald	2019
124	(Belgium) Sander Gillé	2019
125	(Australia) Rameez Junaid	2019
126	(New Zealand) Marcus Daniell	2019
127	(Romania) Marius Copil	2019
128	(United States) Jack Sock	2019
129	(Argentina) Guillermo Durán	2019
130	(India) Jeevan Nedunchezhiyan	2019
131	(Australia) Matthew Ebden	2020

=== Partners in Mixed doubles ===
No.	Partner	Year
1	(Indonesia) Yayuk Basuki	1994–1995
2	(Japan) Kyōko Nagatsuka	1996
3	(Romania) Ruxandra Dragomir-Ilie	1997
4	(Latvia) Larisa Savchenko	1998
5	(Japan) Rika Hiraki	1998
6	(United States) Katrina Adams	1999
7	(United States) Lisa Raymond	1999–2002
8	(Netherlands) Miriam Oremans	2002
9	(United States) Martina Navratilova	2002–2005
10	(France) Nathalie Dechy	2006
11	(Russia) Maria Kirilenko	2006
12	(Australia) Samantha Stosur	2006–2007, 2019
13	(United States) Meghann Shaughnessy	2007
14	(Hungary) Ágnes Szávay	2008
15	(Russia) Nadia Petrova	2008
16	(Australia) Rennae Stubbs	2008
17	(Zimbabwe) Cara Black	2008–2011
18	(Czech Republic) Iveta Benešová	2011
19	(Russia) Elena Vesnina	2011–2013
20	(India) Sania Mirza	2012 (Olympics)
21	(Serbia) Jelena Janković	2013
22	(China) Zheng Saisai	2013
23	(Slovakia) Daniela Hantuchová	2014
24	(Switzerland) Martina Hingis	2015–2017
25	(China) Xu Yifan	2017
26	(Latvia) Jeļena Ostapenko	2020

- These lists consist of players who played with Paes in ATP and ITF-recognized tournaments which include the Olympics, Grand Slams, World Tour Finals, World Tour Masters, World Tour Series, Davis Cup ties, and ATP Challengers. They do not include the players who played with him in the other unrecognized multi-sport events and leagues such as World TeamTennis. The order of the players in the list is based on their first partnering with Paes. Sania Mirza had also earlier played with Paes in 2006 and 2010 in the Asian Games and Commonwealth Games.

=== Other partners ===
==== Indian Team ====
- (India) Mahesh Bhupathi
- (India) Rohan Bopanna
- (India) Sania Mirza

==== World Team Tennis ====
- (United States) Bobby Reynolds
- (Australia) Anastasia Rodionova
- (United States) Venus Williams
- (United States) Serena Williams
- (Australia) Rennae Stubbs
- (United States) Scott Oudsema
- (Switzerland) Martina Hingis
- (United States) Denis Kudla
- (United States) Sam Querrey

==== Champions Tennis League ====
- (Spain) Garbiñe Muguruza
- (India) Somdev Devvarman

== Partnership with Mahesh Bhupathi ==
The duo of Leander Paes and Mahesh Bhupathi was nicknamed the ″Indian Express″. Paes' off-and-on partnership with Bhupathi drew constant media attention in their home country. In the 2006 Asian Games, a loss to the Chinese Taipei team in the team event led Leander to question Bhupathi's commitment to Team India. He once stated in an interview that although he and Bhupathi are friends, he did not consider pairing with his former teammate. However, for the 2008 Beijing Olympics, they reunited for their country, losing in the quarterfinals to eventual champions Federer/Wawrinka.

In 2011, the pair won doubles at the Chennai Open. They reunited to play in a Grand Slam Tournament after nine years and claimed runners-up in the 2011 Australian Open and reached the semifinals in the year-end championships.

The Indian duo has a 303–103 career record together. They have a high success rate against various top teams. They have a Davis Cup record for the longest doubles winning streak, with 24 straight wins.

Paes paired with Vishnu Vardhan at the London Olympics 2012, following Bhupathi and Bopanna 's refusal. Paes threatened to withdraw from the Olympics rather than play with Vardhan, whose world ranking was 296, but withdrew the threat a week later. Paes and Vardhan reached the second round of the tournament, losing to French silver medalists Llodra/Tsonga.

In 2021, Zee5 produced a documentary called Break Point, showing the ups and downs in the relationship between Paes and Bhupathi.

=== Davis Cup record ===
The duo has the longest doubles streak in Davis Cup history.
(24 consecutive wins, total 25–2)

SL	Year	Opponent	Result
1	1995	(Croatia) Saša Hiršzon / Goran Ivanišević	Won
2	1996	(Netherlands) Jacco Eltingh / Paul Haarhuis	Lost
3	1996	(Sweden) Jonas Björkman / Nicklas Kulti	Lost
4	1997	(Czech Republic) Martin Damm / Petr Korda	Won
5	1997	(Chile) Nicolás Massú / Marcelo Ríos	Won
6	1998	(United Kingdom) Neil Broad / Tim Henman	Won
7	1999	(South Korea) Kim Dong-hyun / Hyung-Taik Lee	Won
8	1999	(China) Shan Jiang / Zhu Benqiang	Won
9	2001	(China) Ran Xu / Jing-Zhu Yang	Won
10	2001	(Japan) Thomas Shimada / Takao Suzuki	Won
11	2001	(United States) Donald Johnson / Jared Palmer	Won
12	2002	(Lebanon) Patrick Chucri / Ali Hamadeh	Won
13	2002	(New Zealand) James Shortall / Daniel Willman	Won
14	2003	(Japan) Jun Kato / Thomas Shimada	Won
15	2003	(New Zealand) Alistair Hunt / Mark Nielsen	Won
16	2004	(New Zealand) Mark Nielsen / Matt Prentice	Won
17	2004	(Japan) Thomas Shimada / Takahiro Terachi	Won
18	2005	(China) Wang Yu / Zhu Benqiang	Won
19	2005	(Uzbekistan) Murad Inoyatov / Denis Istomin	Won
20	2005	(Sweden) Simon Aspelin / Jonas Björkman	Won
21	2006	(South Korea) Woong-Sun Jun / Oh-Hee Kwon	Won
22	2006	(Pakistan) Jalil Khan / Asim Shafik	Won
23	2008	(Japan) Satoshi Iwabuchi / Takao Suzuki	Won
24	2008	(Romania) Adrian Cruciat / Horia Tecău	Won
25	2009	(Chinese Taipei) Tsung-Hua Yang / Chu-Huan Yi	Won
26	2010	(Russia) Teymuraz Gabashvili / Igor Kunitsyn	Won
27	2010	(Brazil) Marcelo Melo / Bruno Soares	Won
