= 2001 Touchtel ATP World Doubles Challenge Cup =

- Date: 28 January – 3 February 2002
- Edition: 28th

Champions

Doubles
- (South Africa) Ellis Ferreira / (United States) Rick Leach
- Touchtel ATP World Doubles Challenge Cup

The 2001 Touchtel ATP World Doubles Challenge Cup was a tennis tournament played on outdoor hard courts. It was the 28th edition of the year-end doubles championships and was part of the 2001 ATP Tour. The tournament was held at the KSLTA Tennis Centre in Bangalore in India from 28 January through 3 February 2002.

The tournament had been scheduled to be played between 7 November – 11 November 2001 but was cancelled for security reasons. The Association of Tennis Professionals (ATP) made up for the cancellation by rescheduling the tournament as the ATP World Doubles Challenge Cup and holding it early in the 2002 season.

== Champions ==
=== Men's doubles ===
(South Africa) Ellis Ferreira / (United States) Rick Leach defeated (Czech Republic) Petr Pála / (Czech Republic) Pavel Vízner 6–7^{(6–8)}, 7–6^{(7–2)}, 6–4, 6–4

- It was Ferreira's 3rd title of the year and the 18th of his career. It was Leach's 3rd title of the year and the 26th of his career.
