= 2012 Shanghai Rolex Masters – Doubles =

Doubles
- 2012 Shanghai Rolex Masters

Final
- Champions: (India) Leander Paes (Czech Republic) Radek Štěpánek
- Runners-up: (India) Mahesh Bhupathi (India) Rohan Bopanna
- Score: 6–7^{(7–9)}, 6–3, [10–5]

Events
Singles	Doubles
← 2011 ·	Shanghai Masters	· 2013 →

Max Mirnyi and Daniel Nestor were the defending champions but were beaten in the Quarterfinals by Mahesh Bhupathi and Rohan Bopanna.
Leander Paes and Radek Štěpánek won the title, beating Bhupathi and Bopanna in the final by the score of 6–7^{(7–9)}, 6–3, [10–5].

== Seeds ==
All seeds receive a bye into the second round.

1. (United States) Bob Bryan / (United States) Mike Bryan (second round)
2. (Belarus) Max Mirnyi / (Canada) Daniel Nestor (quarterfinals)
3. (Sweden) Robert Lindstedt / (Romania) Horia Tecău (second round)
4. (India) Leander Paes / (Czech Republic) Radek Štěpánek (champions)
5. (Poland) Mariusz Fyrstenberg / (Poland) Marcin Matkowski (second round)
6. (Pakistan) Aisam-ul-Haq Qureshi / (Netherlands) Jean-Julien Rojer (quarterfinals)
7. (India) Mahesh Bhupathi / (India) Rohan Bopanna (final)
8. (Austria) Alexander Peya / (Brazil) Bruno Soares (second round)

== Draw ==
=== Key ===
- Q = Qualifier
- WC = Wild card
- LL = Lucky loser
- Alt = Alternate
- SE = Special exempt
- PR = Protected ranking
- ITF = ITF entry
- JE = Junior exempt
- w/o = Walkover
- r = Retired
- d = Defaulted
- SR = Special ranking

=== Finals ===
Semifinals
(Croatia) Marin Čilić (Brazil) Marcelo Melo	0	2
4	(India) Leander Paes (Czech Republic) Radek Štěpánek	6	6
(United Kingdom) Colin Fleming (United Kingdom) Ross Hutchins	7^{7}	3	[8]
7	(India) Mahesh Bhupathi (India) Rohan Bopanna	6^{4}	6	[10]

Final
4	(India) Leander Paes (Czech Republic) Radek Štěpánek	6^{7}	6	[10]
7	(India) Mahesh Bhupathi (India) Rohan Bopanna	7^{9}	3	[5]

=== Top half ===
First round
(United States) E Butorac (Germany) P Petzschner	6	6
(Brazil) T Bellucci (Australia) B Tomic	1	0
(Croatia) M Čilić (Brazil) M Melo	6	3	[10]
(Argentina) C Berlocq (Italy) A Seppi	3	6	[4]
(South Africa) K Anderson (United States) S Querrey	6	5	[18]
(Ukraine) A Dolgopolov (France) J-W Tsonga	4	7	[16]
(Austria) J Melzer (Canada) M Raonic	6	6
WC	(China) Y Chang (China) Z Li	1	4

Second round
1	(United States) B Bryan (United States) M Bryan	4	6	[6]
(United States) E Butorac (Germany) P Petzschner	6	3	[10]
(Croatia) M Čilić (Brazil) M Melo	7	7^{7}
5	(Poland) M Fyrstenberg (Poland) M Matkowski	5	6^{4}
4	(India) L Paes (Czech Republic) R Štěpánek	6	6
(South Africa) K Anderson (United States) S Querrey	4	4
(Austria) J Melzer (Canada) M Raonic	6	6
8	(Austria) A Peya (Brazil) B Soares	3	4

Quarterfinals
(United States) E Butorac (Germany) P Petzschner	3	6^{5}
(Croatia) M Čilić (Brazil) M Melo	6	7^{7}
4	(India) L Paes (Czech Republic) R Štěpánek	7	6^{4}	[10]
(Austria) J Melzer (Canada) M Raonic	5	7^{7}	[5]

Semifinals
(Croatia) M Čilić (Brazil) M Melo	0	2
4	(India) L Paes (Czech Republic) R Štěpánek	6	6

=== Bottom half ===
First round
(Spain) D Marrero (Spain) F Verdasco	3	4
(Spain) P Andújar (Spain) F López	6	6
Alt	(Italy) F Fognini (Slovakia) M Kližan	7	4	[5]
(United Kingdom) C Fleming (United Kingdom) R Hutchins	5	6	[10]
(Philippines) TC Huey (United Kingdom) J Marray	7	4	[10]
WC	(China) M Gong (China) Z Zhang	5	6	[6]
(Mexico) S González (United States) S Lipsky	4	6	[6]
(Czech Republic) T Berdych (Serbia) N Zimonjić	6	3	[10]

Second round
6	(Pakistan) A-u-H Qureshi (Netherlands) J-J Rojer	6	1	[10]
(Spain) P Andújar (Spain) F López	2	6	[8]
(United Kingdom) C Fleming (United Kingdom) R Hutchins	6	7
3	(Sweden) R Lindstedt (Romania) H Tecău	4	5
7	(India) M Bhupathi (India) R Bopanna	7^{11}	6
(Philippines) TC Huey (United Kingdom) J Marray	6^{9}	4
(Czech Republic) T Berdych (Serbia) N Zimonjić	2	6^{5}
2	(Belarus) M Mirnyi (Canada) D Nestor	6	7^{7}

Quarterfinals
6	(Pakistan) A-u-H Qureshi (Netherlands) J-J Rojer	6^{2}	6	[10]
(United Kingdom) C Fleming (United Kingdom) R Hutchins	7^{7}	4	[12]
7	(India) M Bhupathi (India) R Bopanna	7^{9}	6
2	(Belarus) M Mirnyi (Canada) D Nestor	6^{7}	4

Semifinals
(United Kingdom) C Fleming (United Kingdom) R Hutchins	7^{7}	3	[8]
7	(India) M Bhupathi (India) R Bopanna	6^{4}	6	[10]
