= 2001 Touchtel ATP World Doubles Challenge Cup – Doubles =

Doubles
- 2001 Touchtel ATP World Doubles Challenge Cup

Final
- Champions: (South Africa) Ellis Ferreira (United States) Rick Leach
- Runners-up: (Czech Republic) Petr Pála (Czech Republic) Pavel Vízner
- Score: 6–7^{(6–8)}, 7–6^{(7–2)}, 6–4, 6–4

Events
Singles	Doubles
← 2000 ·	Touchtel ATP World Doubles Challenge Cup	· 2003 →

Ellis Ferreira and Rick Leach defeated Petr Pála and Pavel Vízner in the final, 6–7^{(6–8)}, 7–6^{(7–2)}, 6–4, 6–4 to win the doubles tennis title at the 2001 Touchtel ATP World Doubles Challenge Cup.

Donald Johnson and Piet Norval were the reigning champions, but only Johnson competed that year partnering Jared Palmer; they were defeated in the semifinals by Pála and Vízner.

== Seeds ==
Champion seeds are indicated in bold text while text in italics indicates the round in which those seeds were eliminated.

1. (United States) Donald Johnson / (United States) Jared Palmer (semifinals)
2. (India) Mahesh Bhupathi / (India) Leander Paes (round robin)
3. (Czech Republic) Petr Pála / (Czech Republic) Pavel Vízner (final)
4. (United States) Bob Bryan / (United States) Mike Bryan (round robin)
5. (The Bahamas) Mark Knowles / (United States) Brian MacPhie (semifinals)
6. **(South Africa) Ellis Ferreira / (United States) Rick Leach (champions)**
7. (South Africa) Chris Haggard / (Belgium) Tom Vanhoudt (round robin)
8. (South Africa) John-Laffnie de Jager / (South Africa) Robbie Koenig (round robin)

== Draw ==
Key

- Q = Qualifier
- WC = Wild card
- LL = Lucky loser
- Alt = Alternate
- ITF = ITF entry
- PR = Protected ranking
- SR = Special ranking
- SE = Special exempt
- JE = Junior exempt
- JR = Junior Accelerator Programme entrant
- CO = College Accelerator Programme entrant
- NG = Next Gen Accelerator Program entrant
- w/o = Walkover
- r = Retired
- d = Defaulted

=== Finals ===
Semifinals
6	(South Africa) **Ellis Ferreira** (United States) **Rick Leach**	**6**	**6**
5	(The Bahamas) Mark Knowles (United States) Brian MacPhie	2	4
1	(United States) Donald Johnson (United States) Jared Palmer	4	1
3	(Czech Republic) **Petr Pála** (Czech Republic) **Pavel Vízner**	**6**	**6**

Final
6	(South Africa) **Ellis Ferreira** (United States) **Rick Leach**	6^{6}	**7^{7}**	**6**	**6**
3	(Czech Republic) Petr Pála (Czech Republic) Pavel Vízner	**7^{8}**	6^{2}	4	4

=== Touchtel group ===
		(United States) **Johnson** (United States) **Palmer**	(United States) B Bryan (United States) M Bryan	(South Africa) **Ferreira** (United States) **Leach**	(South Africa) Haggard (Belgium) Vanhoudt	RR; W–L	Set; W–L	Game; W–L	Standings
1	(United States) **Donald Johnson** (United States) **Jared Palmer**		**7–6^{(7–4)}, 6–3**	4–6, 6–7^{(3–7)}	**6–7^{(6–8)}, 7–6^{(7–3)}, 6–3**	**2–1**	**4–3**	**42–38**	**2**
4	(United States) Bob Bryan (United States) Mike Bryan	6–7^{(4–7)}, 3–6		**6–4, 5–7, 6–4**	**6–3, 6–2**	2–1	4–3	38–33	3
6	(South Africa) **Ellis Ferreira** (United States) **Rick Leach**	**6–4, 7–6^{(7–3)}**	4–6, 7–5, 4–6		**6–7^{(3–7)}, 6–1, 6–3**	**2–1**	**5–3**	**46–38**	**1**
7	(South Africa) Chris Haggard (Belgium) Tom Vanhoudt	7–6^{(8–6)}, 6–7^{(3–7)}, 3–6	3–6, 2–6	7–6^{(7–3)}, 1–6, 3–6		0–3	2–6	32–49	4

Standings are determined by: 1. number of wins; 2. number of matches; 3. in two-players-ties, head-to-head records; 4. in three-players-ties, percentage of sets won, or of games won; 5. steering-committee decision.

=== Bharti group ===
		(India) Bhupathi (India) Paes	(Czech Republic) **Pála** (Czech Republic) **Vízner**	(The Bahamas) **Knowles** (United States) **MacPhie**	(South Africa) de Jager (South Africa) Koenig	RR; W–L	Set; W–L	Game; W–L	Standings
2	(India) Mahesh Bhupathi (India) Leander Paes		6–7^{(6–8)}, 5–7	**7–6^{(7–4)}, 5–7, 6–3**	**6–2, 6–3**	2–1	4–3	41–35	3
3	(Czech Republic) **Petr Pála** (Czech Republic) **Pavel Vízner**	**7–6^{(8–6)}, 7–5**		1–6, 6–3, 5–7	**6–3, 6–2**	**2–1**	**5–2**	**38–32**	**1**
5	(The Bahamas) **Mark Knowles** (United States) **Brian MacPhie**	6–7^{(4–7)}, 7–5, 3–6	**6–1, 3–6, 7–5**		**6–3, 7–6^{(7–3)}**	**2–1**	**5–3**	**45–39**	**2**
8	(South Africa) J-L de Jager (South Africa) Robbie Koenig	2–6, 3–6	3–6, 2–6	3–6, 6–7^{(3–7)}		0–3	0–6	19–37	4

Standings are determined by: 1. number of wins; 2. number of matches; 3. in two-players-ties, head-to-head records; 4. in three-players-ties, percentage of sets won, or of games won; 5. steering-committee decision.
