= 1999 ATP Tour World Championships – Doubles =

Doubles
- 1999 ATP Tour World Championships

Final
- Champions: (Canada) Sébastien Lareau (United States) Alex O'Brien
- Runners-up: (India) Mahesh Bhupathi (India) Leander Paes
- Score: 6–3, 6–2, 6–2

Details
- Draw: 8

Events
Singles	Doubles
← 1998 ·	ATP Tour World Championships	· 2000 →

Sébastien Lareau and Alex O'Brien defeated Mahesh Bhupathi and Leander Paes in the final, 6–3, 6–2, 6–2 to win the doubles tennis title at the 1999 ATP Tour World Championships.

Jacco Eltingh and Paul Haarhuis were the reigning champions, but did not compete together in 1999. Eltingh retired from the sport on November 22, 1998; Haarhuis qualified with Jared Palmer, but was eliminated in the round-robin stage.

== Seeds ==
1. (India) Mahesh Bhupathi / (India) Leander Paes (final)
2. (Australia) Todd Woodbridge / (Australia) Mark Woodforde (semifinals)
3. (South Africa) Ellis Ferreira / (United States) Rick Leach (round robin)
4. (Canada) Sébastien Lareau / (United States) Alex O'Brien (champions)
5. (South Africa) David Adams / (South Africa) John-Laffnie de Jager (round robin, withdrew due to a flu of de Jager)
6. (Zimbabwe) Wayne Black / (Australia) Sandon Stolle (semifinals)
7. (Netherlands) Paul Haarhuis / (United States) Jared Palmer (round robin)
8. (South Africa) Piet Norval / (Zimbabwe) Kevin Ullyett (round robin)
9. (Czech Republic) Jiří Novák / (Czech Republic) David Rikl (round robin)

== Draw ==
Key

- Q = Qualifier
- WC = Wild card
- LL = Lucky loser
- Alt = Alternate
- ITF = ITF entry
- PR = Protected ranking
- SR = Special ranking
- SE = Special exempt
- JE = Junior exempt
- JR = Junior Accelerator Programme entrant
- CO = College Accelerator Programme entrant
- NG = Next Gen Accelerator Program entrant
- w/o = Walkover
- r = Retired
- d = Defaulted

=== Finals ===
Semifinals
1	(India) Mahesh Bhupathi (India) Leander Paes	5	6	7
2	(Australia) Todd Woodbridge (Australia) Mark Woodforde	7	2	5
4	(Canada) Sébastien Lareau (United States) Alex O'Brien	6	7
6	(Zimbabwe) Wayne Black (Australia) Sandon Stolle	3	5

Final
1	(India) Mahesh Bhupathi (India) Leander Paes	3	2	2
4	(Canada) Sébastien Lareau (United States) Alex O'Brien	6	6	6

=== Gold group ===
		(India) Bhupathi (India) Paes	(South Africa) Ferreira (United States) Leach	(Zimbabwe) Black (Australia) Stolle	(South Africa) Norval (Zimbabwe) Ullyett	RR; W–L	Set; W–L	Game; W–L	Standings
1	(India) Mahesh Bhupathi (India) Leander Paes		6–4, 6–4	7–6^{(7–5)}, 5–7, 2–6	7–6^{(7–1)}, 6–3	2–1	5–2	39–36	2
3	(South Africa) Ellis Ferreira (United States) Rick Leach	4–6, 4–6		6–3, 6–2	3–6, 3–6	1–2	2–4	26–29	4
6	(Zimbabwe) Wayne Black (Australia) Sandon Stolle	6–7^{(5–7)}, 7–5, 6–2	3–6, 2–6		7–6^{(7–5)}, 6–1	2–1	4–3	37–33	1
8	(South Africa) Piet Norval (Zimbabwe) Kevin Ullyett	6–7^{(1–7)}, 3–6	6–3, 6–3	6–7^{(5–7)}, 1–6		1–2	2–4	28–32	3

Standings are determined by: 1. number of wins; 2. number of matches; 3. in two-players-ties, head-to-head records; 4. in three-players-ties, percentage of sets won, or of games won; 5. steering-committee decision.

=== Green group ===
		(Australia) Woodbridge (Australia) Woodforde	(Canada) Lareau (United States) O'Brien	(South Africa) Adams (South Africa) de Jager (Czech Republic) Novák (Czech Republic) Rikl	(Netherlands) Haarhuis (United States) Plamer	RR; W–L	Set; W–L	Game; W–L	Standings
2	(Australia) Todd Woodbridge (Australia) Mark Woodforde		7–6^{(7–3)}, 6–4	6–2, 6–4 (w/ Novák / Rikl)	6–4, 6–2	3–0	6–0	37–22	1
4	(Canada) Sébastien Lareau (United States) Alex O'Brien	6–7^{(3–7)}, 4–6		6–2, 7–6^{(7–5)} (w/ Adams / de Jager)	7–6^{(7–1)}, 6–2	2–1	4–2	36–29	2
5; 9	(South Africa) David Adams (South Africa) John-Laffnie de Jager (Czech Republic) Jiří Novák (Czech Republic) David Rikl	2–6, 4–6 (w/ Novák / Rikl)	2–6, 6–7^{(5–7)} (w/ Adams / de Jager)		4–6, 5–7 (w/ Adams / de Jager)	0–2; 0–1	0–4; 0–2	17–26; 6–12	4; 5
7	(Netherlands) Paul Haarhuis (United States) Jared Palmer	4–6, 2–6	6–7^{(1–7)}, 2–6	6–4, 7–5 (w/ Adams / de Jager)		1–2	2–4	27–34	3

Standings are determined by: 1. number of wins; 2. number of matches; 3. in two-players-ties, head-to-head records; 4. in three-players-ties, percentage of sets won, or of games won; 5. steering-committee decision.
