= 2000 ATP Tour World Championships – Doubles =

Doubles
- 2000 ATP Tour World Championships

Final
- Champions: (United States) Donald Johnson (South Africa) Piet Norval
- Runners-up: (India) Mahesh Bhupathi (India) Leander Paes
- Score: 7–6^{(10–8)}, 6–3, 6–4

Details
- Draw: 8

Events
Singles	Doubles
← 1999 ·	ATP Tour World Championships	· 2001 →

Donald Johnson and Piet Norval defeated Mahesh Bhupathi and Leander Paes in the final, 7–6^{(10–8)}, 6–3, 6–4 to win the doubles tennis title at the 2000 ATP Tour World Championships.

Sébastien Lareau and Alex O'Brien were the reigning champions, but did not compete together in 2000. Lareau failed to qualify with another partner, while O'Brien qualified with Jared Palmer, but was eliminated in the round-robin stage.

== Seeds ==
1. (South Africa) Ellis Ferreira / (United States) Rick Leach (semifinals)
2. (Netherlands) Paul Haarhuis / (Australia) Sandon Stolle (round robin)
3. (United States) Alex O'Brien / (United States) Jared Palmer (round robin)
4. (Australia) Joshua Eagle / (Australia) Andrew Florent (round robin)
5. (United States) Donald Johnson / (South Africa) Piet Norval (champions)
6. (Brazil) Jaime Oncins / (Argentina) Daniel Orsanic (round robin)
7. (Sweden) Simon Aspelin / (Sweden) Johan Landsberg (semifinals)
8. (India) Mahesh Bhupathi / (India) Leander Paes (final)

== Draw ==
Key

- Q = Qualifier
- WC = Wild card
- LL = Lucky loser
- Alt = Alternate
- ITF = ITF entry
- PR = Protected ranking
- SR = Special ranking
- SE = Special exempt
- JE = Junior exempt
- JR = Junior Accelerator Programme entrant
- CO = College Accelerator Programme entrant
- NG = Next Gen Accelerator Program entrant
- w/o = Walkover
- r = Retired
- d = Defaulted

=== Finals ===
Semifinals
7	(Sweden) Simon Aspelin (Sweden) Johan Landsberg	4	7	3
5	(United States) Donald Johnson (South Africa) Piet Norval	6	5	6
8	(India) Mahesh Bhupathi (India) Leander Paes	6	7
1	(South Africa) Ellis Ferreira (United States) Rick Leach	3	5

Final
5	(United States) Donald Johnson (South Africa) Piet Norval	7^{10}	6	6
8	(India) Mahesh Bhupathi (India) Leander Paes	6^{8}	3	4

=== Red group ===
		(South Africa) Ferreira (United States) Leach	(Australia) Eagle (Australia) Florent	(Brazil) Ocins (Argentina) Orsanic	(Sweden) Aspelin (Sweden) Landsberg	RR; W–L	Set; W–L	Game; W–L	Standings
1	(South Africa) Ellis Ferreira (United States) Rick Leach		4–6, 6–3, 7–6^{(7–2)}	6–1, 5–7, 5–7	1–6, 6–3, 1–6	1–2	4–5	41–45	2
4	(Australia) Joshua Eagle (Australia) Andrew Florent	6–4, 3–6, 6–7^{(2–7)}		6–1, 3–6, 6–4	5–7, 6–7^{(4–7)}	1–2	3–5	41–42	3
6	(Brazil) Jaime Oncins (Argentina) Daniel Orsanic	1–6, 7–5, 7–5	1–6, 6–3, 4–6		2–6, 4–6	1–2	3–5	32–43	4
7	(Sweden) Simon Aspelin (Sweden) Johan Landsberg	6–1, 3–6, 6–1	7–5, 7–6^{(7–4)}	6–2, 6–4		3–0	6–1	41–25	1

Standings are determined by: 1. number of wins; 2. number of matches; 3. in two-players-ties, head-to-head records; 4. in three-players-ties, percentage of sets won, or of games won; 5. steering-committee decision.

=== Gold group ===
		(Netherlands) Haarhuis (Australia) Stolle	(United States) O'Brien (United States) Palmer	(United States) Johnson (South Africa) Norval	(India) Bhupathi (India) Paes	RR; W–L	Set; W–L	Game; W–L	Standings
2	(Netherlands) Paul Haarhuis (Australia) Sandon Stolle		5–7, 6–2, 6–4	2–6, 6–7^{(6–8)}	5–7, 4–6	1–2	2–5	34–39	3
3	(United States) Alex O'Brien (United States) Jared Palmer	7–5, 2–6, 4–6		5–7, 6–7^{(7–9)}	2–6, 6–4, 7–6^{(7–5)}	1–2	3–5	39–47	4
5	(United States) Donald Johnson (South Africa) Piet Norval	6–2, 7–6^{(8–6)}	7–5, 7–6^{(9–7)}		4–6, 4–6	2–1	4–2	35–31	2
8	(India) Mahesh Bhupathi (India) Leander Paes	7–5, 6–4	6–2, 4–6, 6–7^{(5–7)}	6–4, 6–4		2–1	5–2	41–32	1

Standings are determined by: 1. number of wins; 2. number of matches; 3. in two-players-ties, head-to-head records; 4. in three-players-ties, percentage of sets won, or of games won; 5. steering-committee decision.
