= Mahesh Bhupathi =

Indian tennis player (born 1974)

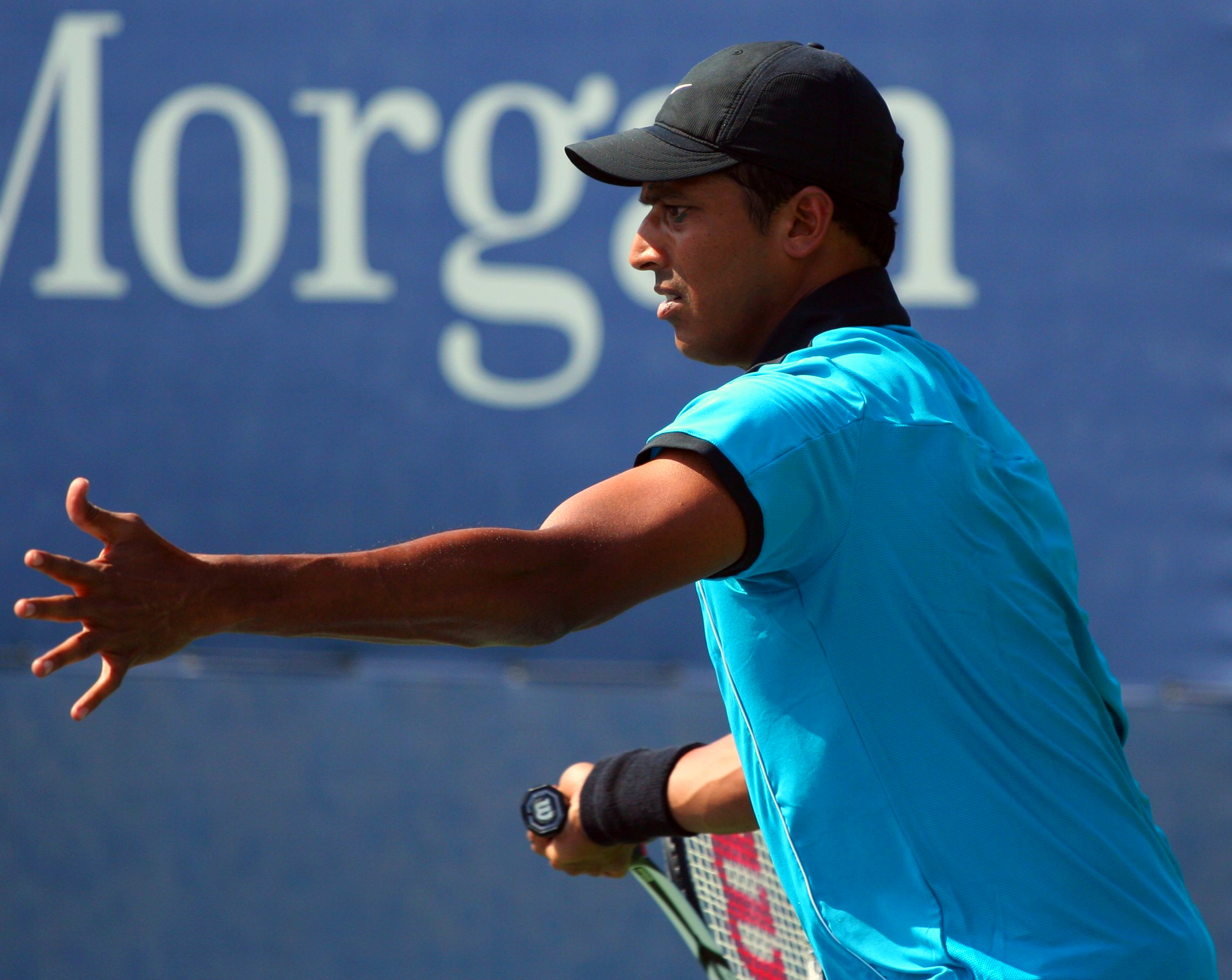
- Bhupathi at the US Open
- Full name: Mahesh Shrinivas Bhupathi
- Country (sports): India
- Born: 7 June 1974 (age 52) Chennai, Tamil Nadu, India
- Height: 1.85 m (6 ft 1 in)
- Turned pro: 1995
- Retired: 2016
- College: Ole Miss
- Prize money: US$6,665,907

Singles
- Career record: 10–28
- Career titles: 0
- Highest ranking: No. 217 (2 February 1998)

Grand Slam singles results
- Australian Open: Q2 (1998)
- French Open: Q3 (1996, 1999)
- Wimbledon: 1R (1997, 1998, 2000)
- US Open: 1R (1995)

Doubles
- Career record: 687–364
- Career titles: 52
- Highest ranking: No. 1 (26 April 1999)

Grand Slam doubles results
- Australian Open: F (1999, 2009, 2011)
- French Open: W (1999, 2001)
- Wimbledon: W (1999)
- US Open: W (2002)

Other doubles tournaments
- Tour Finals: F (1997, 1999, 2000, 2010, 2012)
- Olympic Games: SF – 4th (2004)

Mixed doubles
- Career record: 115–53
- Career titles: 8

Grand Slam mixed doubles results
- Australian Open: W (2006, 2009)
- French Open: W (1997, 2012)
- Wimbledon: W (2002, 2005)
- US Open: W (1999, 2005)

Team competitions
- Davis Cup: QF (1996)
Medal record
Representing India
Men's tennis
Asian Games
Gold medal – first place	2002 Busan	Doubles
Gold medal – first place	2006 Doha	Doubles
Silver medal – second place	2002 Busan	Mixed doubles
Bronze medal – third place	1998 Bangkok	Singles
Bronze medal – third place	1998 Bangkok	Team Event
Bronze medal – third place	1998 Bangkok	Mixed doubles
Commonwealth Games
Bronze medal – third place	2010 Delhi	Doubles
Afro-Asian Games
Gold medal – first place	2003 Hyderabad	Doubles
Gold medal – first place	2003 Hyderabad	Mixed doubles
- Last updated on: 14 November 2016.

Mahesh Shrinivas Bhupathi (born 7 June 1974) is an Indian former doubles world No. 1 tennis player. In 1997, he became the first Indian to win a major tournament (with Rika Hiraki). (Note: Hiraki was the first Japanese woman to win a Grand Slam tournament, while Bhupathi was the first Indian to win a Grand Slam in mixed doubles.) With his win at the 2006 Australian Open mixed doubles, he joined the elite group of eight tennis players who have achieved a career Grand Slam in mixed doubles. He is also the founder of International Premier Tennis League. In December 2016, Bhupathi was appointed as India's next non-playing Davis Cup captain and took over the reins from Anand Amritraj in February 2017.

== Career ==
=== 1995–2006 ===
Mahesh Bhupathi is considered one of the top doubles players of the 1990s and 2000s. In 1999, Bhupathi won three doubles titles with Leander Paes, including the French Open and Wimbledon. He and Paes became the first doubles team to reach the finals of all four Grand Slams, the first time such a feat has been achieved in the open era and the first time since 1952. On 26 April of that year, they became the world no. 1 doubles team. Bhupathi also won the US Open mixed doubles with Ai Sugiyama of Japan.

In 2006, Bhupathi teamed with Martina Hingis in the Australian Open mixed doubles competition. Entering the tournament unseeded and as wildcards, the first-time pair defeated four seeded opponents along the way, while only dropping a single set throughout. Bhupathi and Hingis defeated the sixth-seeded team of Daniel Nestor and Elena Likhovtseva in straight sets, 6–3, 6–3, to capture the championship. It was the sixth mixed doubles Grand Slam for Bhupathi, and the first one for Hingis. By winning the Australian Open, Bhupathi completed a career Grand Slam in mixed doubles.

=== 2007–2008 ===
In 2007, Bhupathi and Radek Štěpánek reached the 2007 Australian Open men's doubles event's quarterfinals. Bhupathi teamed with Štěpánek at the 2007 French Open to make the doubles semifinals, defeating two-year defending champions Jonas Björkman and Max Mirnyi in the quarterfinals. The team lost to the eventual champions Mark Knowles and Daniel Nestor. After Wimbledon, Bhupathi teamed with Pavel Vízner to win the 2007 Canada Masters, defeating the top-ranked doubles team Bob and Mike Bryan en route. After this victory, he won a tournament in New Haven with Nenad Zimonjić. At the 2007 US Open, he and Zimonjić paired in doubles. After the US Open, the team that beat Bhupathi and Štěpánek in the French Open semifinals, Knowles and Nestor, split up. Bhupathi became Knowles' partner, while Zimonjić became Nestor's, but back surgery meant he was out until the end of the year.

=== 2009–2012 ===
In 2009, Bhupathi and compatriot Sania Mirza won the mixed doubles title at the Australian Open, beating Nathalie Dechy and Andy Ram, 6–3, 6–1, in the final. The Indian pair thus made up for the disappointment of the previous year's final when they were beaten by Sun Tiantian and Nenad Zimonjić. With this win, Bhupathi's count in mixed doubles Grand Slam titles increased to seven.

Bhupathi broke up his partnership with Knowles and began playing once again with Max Mirnyi, with whom he played to win the 2002 US Open. In 2011, Bhupathi reunited with former playing partner Leander Paes for the 2011 Australian Open. The team reached the final, but lost 3–6, 4–6 to the Bryan brothers. On 7 June 2012, Bhupathi and Sania Mirza won the French Open mixed doubles. On 4 November 2012, Bhupathi and partner Rohan Bopanna won the Paris Masters cup. In spite of suffering a setback with their loss against Jonathan Marray and Frederik Nielsen in the ATP Tour Finals opener, the Indian duo reached the final round of the ATP Tour Finals, but suffered a defeat at the hands of Marcel Granollers and Marc López.

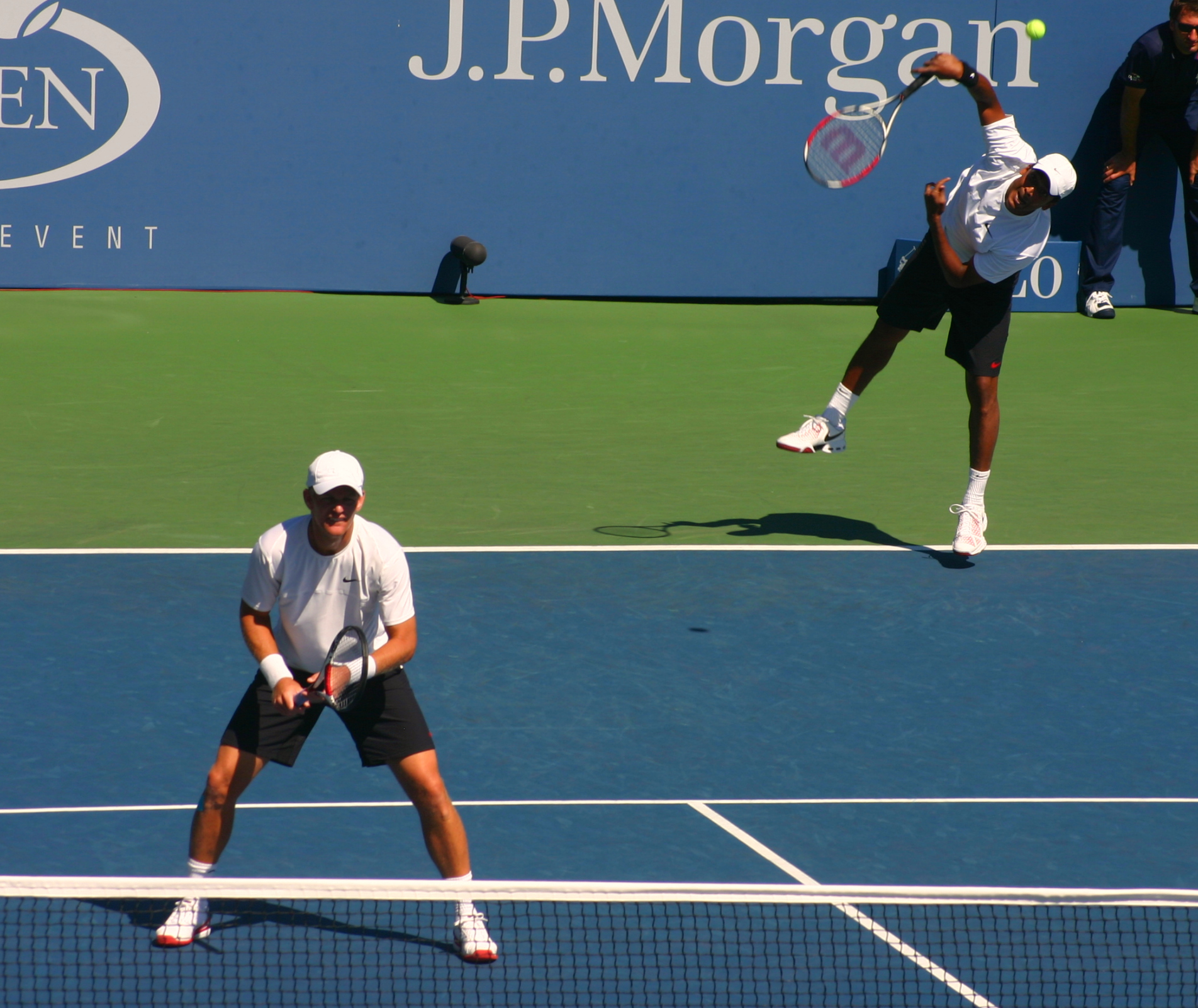
Bhupathi serves in his third-round match partnering Mark Knowles during the 2008 US Open.

=== 2013 ===
Bhupathi and Bopanna played with different partners for the first three months of 2013, Bhupathi winning the tournament in Dubai in March with Michaël Llodra, but rejoined starting with the Monte-Carlo Masters.

== Playing style ==
Mahesh Bhupathi is known for his strong serve. According to Rafael Nadal, his strong backhand makes him the best for an Ad Court player. Roger Federer acclaims him as one of the best doubles players of all time. He often discusses strategies between the serves with his partner during the match and also communicates using finger-at-the-back signals.

== Year-end finals ==
Bhupathi appeared with Paes in six season finales. In 2011, they appeared, for the first time since 2002, after securing qualification in mid-October. Bhupathi played at the year-end championships with Paes from 1997 to 2000 and in 2002, reaching three finals. In 1997, they lost the final to Rick Leach and Jonathan Stark. They lost the 1999 final to Sébastien Lareau and Alex O’Brien. In 2000, they lost the final to Donald Johnson and Pieter Norval. Bhupathi also qualified with Max Mirnyi in 2003, 2004, and 2010, when they finished runners-up to Daniel Nestor and Nenad Zimonjić. He appeared at the finals with Mark Knowles in 2008 and 2009. In 2012, he and Rohan Bopanna made it to the final, where they lost to Marcel Granollers and Marc López.

== Significant finals ==
=== Doubles: 10 (4 titles, 6 runner-ups) ===
Result	Year	Championship	Surface	Partner	Opponents	Score
Loss	1999	Australian Open	Hard	(India) Leander Paes	(Sweden) Jonas Björkman (Australia) Pat Rafter	3–6, 6–4, 4–6, 7–6^{(12–10)}, 4–6
Win	1999	French Open	Clay	(India) Leander Paes	(Croatia) Goran Ivanišević (United States) Jeff Tarango	6–2, 7–5
Win	1999	Wimbledon	Grass	(India) Leander Paes	(Netherlands) Paul Haarhuis (United States) Jared Palmer	6–7^{(10–12)}, 6–3, 6–4, 7–6^{(7–4)}
Loss	1999	US Open	Hard	(India) Leander Paes	(United States) Alex O'Brien (Canada) Sébastien Lareau	6–7^{(7–9)}, 4–6
Win	2001	French Open (2)	Clay	(India) Leander Paes	(Czech Republic) Petr Pála (Czech Republic) Pavel Vízner	7–6^{(7–5)}, 6–3
Win	2002	US Open	Hard	(Belarus) Max Mirnyi	(Czech Republic) Jiří Novák (Czech Republic) Radek Štěpánek	6–3, 3–6, 6–4
Loss	2003	Wimbledon	Grass	(Belarus) Max Mirnyi	(Sweden) Jonas Björkman (Australia) Todd Woodbridge	6–3, 3–6, 6–7^{(4–7)}, 3–6
Loss	2009	Australian Open	Hard	(The Bahamas) Mark Knowles	(United States) Bob Bryan (United States) Mike Bryan	6–2, 5–7, 0–6
Loss	2009	US Open	Hard	(The Bahamas) Mark Knowles	(Czech Republic) Lukáš Dlouhý (India) Leander Paes	6–3, 3–6, 2–6
Loss	2011	Australian Open	Hard	(India) Leander Paes	(United States) Bob Bryan (United States) Mike Bryan	3–6, 4–6

=== Mixed doubles: 12 (8 titles, 4 runner-ups) ===
By winning the 2006 Australian Open title, Bhupathi completed the mixed doubles Career Grand Slam. He became the eighth male player in history to achieve this.

Result	Year	Championship	Surface	Partner	Opponents	Score
Win	1997	French Open	Clay	(Japan) Rika Hiraki	(United States) Lisa Raymond (United States) Patrick Galbraith	6–4, 6–1
Loss	1998	Wimbledon	Grass	(Croatia) Mirjana Lučić	(United States) Serena Williams (Belarus) Max Mirnyi	4–6, 4–6
Win	1999	US Open	Hard	(Japan) Ai Sugiyama	(United States) Kimberly Po (United States) Donald Johnson	6–4, 6–4
Win	2002	Wimbledon	Grass	(Russia) Elena Likhovtseva	(Slovakia) Daniela Hantuchová (Zimbabwe) Kevin Ullyett	6–2, 1–6, 6–1
Loss	2003	French Open	Clay	(Russia) Elena Likhovtseva	(United States) Lisa Raymond (United States) Mike Bryan	3–6, 4–6
Win	2005	Wimbledon (2)	Grass	(France) Mary Pierce	(Ukraine) Tatiana Perebiynis (Australia) Paul Hanley	6–4, 6–2
Win	2005	US Open (2)	Hard	(Slovakia) Daniela Hantuchová	(Slovenia) Katarina Srebotnik (Serbia and Montenegro) Nenad Zimonjić	6–4, 6–2
Win	2006	Australian Open	Hard	(Switzerland) Martina Hingis	(Russia) Elena Likhovtseva (Canada) Daniel Nestor	6–3, 6–3
Loss	2008	Australian Open	Hard	(India) Sania Mirza	(China) Sun Tiantian (Serbia) Nenad Zimonjić	6–7^{(4–7)}, 4–6
Win	2009	Australian Open (2)	Hard	(India) Sania Mirza	(France) Nathalie Dechy (Israel) Andy Ram	6–3, 6–1
Loss	2011	Wimbledon	Grass	(Russia) Elena Vesnina	(Czech Republic) Iveta Benešová (Austria) Jürgen Melzer	3–6, 2–6
Win	2012	French Open (2)	Clay	(India) Sania Mirza	(Poland) Klaudia Jans-Ignacik (Mexico) Santiago González	7–6^{(7–3)}, 6–1

=== Olympic medal matches ===
==== Doubles: 1 (1 fourth place) ====
Result	Year	Championship	Surface	Partner	Opponents	Score
4th place	2004	Summer Olympics, Athens	Hard	(India) Leander Paes	(Croatia) Mario Ančić (Croatia) Ivan Ljubičić	6–7^{(5–7)}, 6–4, 14–16

== ATP career finals ==
=== Doubles: 96 (52–44) ===
Legend Grand Slam (4–6) ATP World Tour Finals (0–5) ATP World Tour Masters 1000 (16–14) ATP World Tour 500 Series (8–7) ATP World Tour 250 Series (24–12)	Titles by surface Hard (32–26) Clay (13–4) Grass (2–6) Carpet (5–7)

Result	W–L	Date	Tournament	Surface	Partnering	Opponent	Score
Win	1–0	Apr 1997	Chennai, India	Hard	(India) Leander Paes	(Uzbekistan) Oleg Ogorodov (Israel) Eyal Ran	7–6, 7–5
Win	2–0	May 1997	Prague, Czech Republic	Clay	(India) Leander Paes	(Czech Republic) Petr Luxa (Czech Republic) David Škoch	6–1, 6–1
Loss	2–1	Jul 1997	Los Angeles, United States	Hard	(United States) Rick Leach	(Canada) Sébastien Lareau (United States) Alex O'Brien	6–7, 4–6
Win	3–1	Aug 1997	Montréal, Canada	Hard	(India) Leander Paes	(Canada) Sébastien Lareau (United States) Alex O'Brien	7–6, 6–3
Win	4–1	Aug 1997	New Haven, United States	Hard	(India) Leander Paes	(Canada) Sébastien Lareau (United States) Alex O'Brien	6–4, 6–7, 6–2
Win	5–1	Oct 1997	Beijing, China	Hard (i)	(India) Leander Paes	(United States) Jim Courier (United States) Alex O'Brien	7–5, 7–6
Win	6–1	Oct 1997	Singapore, Singapore	Carpet	(India) Leander Paes	(United States) Rick Leach (United States) Jonathan Stark	6–4, 6–4
Loss	6–2	Nov 1997	Hartford, United States	Carpet	(India) Leander Paes	(United States) Rick Leach (United States) Jonathan Stark	3–6, 4–6, 6–7
Win	7–2	Jan 1998	Doha, Qatar	Hard	(India) Leander Paes	(France) Olivier Delaître (France) Fabrice Santoro	6–4, 3–6, 6–4
Win	8–2	Feb 1998	Dubai, United Arab Emirates	Hard	(India) Leander Paes	(United States) Donald Johnson (United States) Francisco Montana	6–2, 7–5
Win	9–2	Apr 1998	Chennai, India	Hard	(India) Leander Paes	(France) Olivier Delaître (Belarus) Max Mirnyi	6–7, 6–3, 6–2
Win	10–2	May 1998	Rome, Italy	Clay	(India) Leander Paes	(South Africa) Ellis Ferreira (United States) Rick Leach	6–4, 4–6, 7–6
Win	11–2	Oct 1998	Shanghai, China	Carpet	(India) Leander Paes	(Australia) Todd Woodbridge (Australia) Mark Woodforde	6–4, 6–7, 7–6
Loss	11–3	Oct 1998	Singapore, Singapore	Carpet	(India) Leander Paes	(Australia) Todd Woodbridge (Australia) Mark Woodforde	2–6, 3–6
Loss	11–4	Nov 1998	Stuttgart, Germany	Hard (i)	(India) Leander Paes	(Canada) Sébastien Lareau (United States) Alex O'Brien	3–6, 6–3, 5–7
Win	12–4	Nov 1998	Paris, France	Carpet	(India) Leander Paes	(Netherlands) Jacco Eltingh (Netherlands) Paul Haarhuis	6–4, 6–2
Loss	12–5	Feb 1999	Melbourne, Australia	Hard	(India) Leander Paes	(Sweden) Jonas Björkman (Australia) Patrick Rafter	3–6, 6–4, 4–6, 7–6, 4–6
Win	13–5	Apr 1999	Chennai, India	Hard	(India) Leander Paes	(Zimbabwe) Wayne Black (South Africa) Neville Godwin	4–6, 7–5, 6–4
Win	14–5	Jun 1999	Paris, France	Clay	(India) Leander Paes	(Croatia) Goran Ivanišević (United States) Jeff Tarango	6–2, 7–5
Win	15–5	Jul 1999	London, United Kingdom	Grass	(India) Leander Paes	(Netherlands) Paul Haarhuis (United States) Jared Palmer	6–7, 6–3, 6–4, 7–6
Loss	15–6	Sep 1999	New York, United States	Hard	(India) Leander Paes	(Canada) Sébastien Lareau (United States) Alex O'Brien	6–7, 4–6
Loss	15–7	Nov 1999	Hartford, United States	Carpet	(India) Leander Paes	(Canada) Sébastien Lareau (United States) Alex O'Brien	3–6, 2–6, 2–6
Win	16–7	May 2000	St. Pölten, Austria	Clay	(Australia) Andrew Kratzmann	(Italy) Andrea Gaudenzi (Italy) Diego Nargiso	7–6, 6–7, 6–4
Loss	16–8	Jun 2000	Halle, Germany	Grass	(Germany) David Prinosil	(Sweden) Nicklas Kulti (Sweden) Mikael Tillström	6–7, 6–7
Win	17–8	Oct 2000	Tokyo, Japan	Hard	(India) Leander Paes	(Australia) Michael Hill (United States) Jeff Tarango	6–4, 6–7, 6–3
Loss	17–9	Dec 2000	Bangalore, India	Hard	(India) Leander Paes	(United States) Donald Johnson (South Africa) Piet Norval	6–7, 3–6, 4–6
Win	18–9	Apr 2001	Atlanta, United States	Clay	(India) Leander Paes	(United States) Rick Leach (Australia) David Macpherson	6–3, 7–6
Win	19–9	May 2001	Houston, United States	Clay	(India) Leander Paes	(United States) Kevin Kim (United States) Jim Thomas	7–6, 6–2
Win	20–9	Jun 2001	Paris, France	Clay	(India) Leander Paes	(Czech Republic) Petr Pála (Czech Republic) Pavel Vízner	7–6, 6–3
Win	21–9	Aug 2001	Cincinnati, United States	Hard	(India) Leander Paes	(Czech Republic) Martin Damm (Germany) David Prinosil	7–6, 6–3
Loss	21–10	Aug 2001	Indianapolis, United States	Hard	(Canada) Sébastien Lareau	(The Bahamas) Mark Knowles (United States) Brian MacPhie	6–7, 7–5, 4–6
Loss	21–11	Oct 2001	Moscow, Russia	Carpet	(United States) Jeff Tarango	(Belarus) Max Mirnyi (Australia) Sandon Stolle	3–6, 0–6
Loss	21–12	Oct 2001	Basel, Switzerland	Carpet	(India) Leander Paes	(South Africa) Ellis Ferreira (United States) Rick Leach	6–7, 4–6
Loss	21–13	Nov 2001	Paris, France	Carpet	(India) Leander Paes	(South Africa) Ellis Ferreira (United States) Rick Leach	6–3, 4–6, 3–6
Win	22–13	Jan 2002	Chennai, India	Hard	(India) Leander Paes	(Czech Republic) Tomáš Cibulec (Czech Republic) Ota Fukárek	5–7, 6–2, 7–5
Win	23–13	May 2002	Majorca, Spain	Clay	(India) Leander Paes	(Austria) Julian Knowle (Germany) Michael Kohlmann	6–2, 6–4
Win	24–13	May 2002	Hamburg, Germany	Clay	(United States) Jan-Michael Gambill	(Sweden) Jonas Björkman (Australia) Todd Woodbridge	6–2, 6–4
Loss	24–14	Jun 2002	London, United Kingdom	Grass	(Belarus) Max Mirnyi	(Zimbabwe) Wayne Black (Zimbabwe) Kevin Ullyett	5–7, 3–6
Loss	24–15	Aug 2002	Cincinnati, United States	Hard	(Belarus) Max Mirnyi	(United States) James Blake (United States) Todd Martin	5–7, 3–6
Loss	24–16	Aug 2002	Indianapolis, United States	Hard	(Belarus) Max Mirnyi	(The Bahamas) Mark Knowles (Canada) Daniel Nestor	6–7, 7–6, 4–6
Win	25–16	Aug 2002	Long Island, United States	Hard	(United States) Mike Bryan	(Czech Republic) Petr Pála (Czech Republic) Pavel Vízner	6–3, 6–4
Win	26–16	Sep 2002	New York, United States	Hard	(Belarus) Max Mirnyi	(Czech Republic) Jiří Novák (Czech Republic) Radek Štěpánek	6–3, 3–6, 6–4
Loss	26–17	Oct 2002	Madrid, Spain	Hard (i)	(Belarus) Max Mirnyi	(The Bahamas) Mark Knowles (Canada) Daniel Nestor	3–6, 5–7, 0–6
Loss	26–18	Jan 2003	Sydney, Australia	Hard	(Australia) Joshua Eagle	(Australia) Paul Hanley (Australia) Nathan Healey	6–7, 4–6
Win	27–18	Apr 2003	Estoril, Portugal	Clay	(Belarus) Max Mirnyi	(Argentina) Lucas Arnold Ker (Argentina) Mariano Hood	6–1, 6–2
Win	28–18	Apr 2003	Monte Carlo, Monaco	Clay	(Belarus) Max Mirnyi	(France) Michaël Llodra (France) Fabrice Santoro	6–4, 3–6, 7–6
Loss	28–19	May 2003	Hamburg, Germany	Clay	(Belarus) Max Mirnyi	(The Bahamas) Mark Knowles (Canada) Daniel Nestor	4–6, 6–7
Loss	28–20	Jun 2003	London, United Kingdom	Grass	(Belarus) Max Mirnyi	(The Bahamas) Mark Knowles (Canada) Daniel Nestor	7–5, 4–6, 6–7
Loss	28–21	Jul 2003	London, United Kingdom	Grass	(Belarus) Max Mirnyi	(Sweden) Jonas Björkman (Australia) Todd Woodbridge	6–3, 3–6, 6–7, 3–6
Win	29–21	Aug 2003	Montréal, Canada	Hard	(Belarus) Max Mirnyi	(Sweden) Jonas Björkman (Australia) Todd Woodbridge	6–3, 7–6
Win	30–21	Oct 2003	Moscow, Russia	Carpet	(Belarus) Max Mirnyi	(Zimbabwe) Wayne Black (Zimbabwe) Kevin Ullyett	6–3, 7–5
Loss	30–22	Oct 2003	Vienna, Austria	Hard (i)	(Belarus) Max Mirnyi	(Switzerland) Yves Allegro (Switzerland) Roger Federer	6–7, 5–7
Win	31–22	Oct 2003	Madrid, Spain	Hard (i)	(Belarus) Max Mirnyi	(Zimbabwe) Wayne Black (Zimbabwe) Kevin Ullyett	6–2, 2–6, 6–3
Win	32–22	Jan 2004	Auckland, New Zealand	Hard	(France) Fabrice Santoro	(Zimbabwe) Wayne Black (Zimbabwe) Kevin Ullyett	4–6, 7–5, 6–3
Win	33–22	Mar 2004	Dubai, United Arab Emirates	Hard	(France) Fabrice Santoro	(Sweden) Jonas Björkman (India) Leander Paes	6–2, 4–6, 6–4
Win	34–22	May 2004	Rome, Italy	Clay	(Belarus) Max Mirnyi	(Australia) Wayne Arthurs (Australia) Paul Hanley	2–6, 6–3, 6–4
Win	35–22	Jul 2004	Båstad, Sweden	Clay	(Sweden) Jonas Björkman	(Sweden) Simon Aspelin (Australia) Todd Perry	4–6, 7–6, 7–6
Win	36–22	Aug 2004	Toronto, Canada	Hard	(India) Leander Paes	(Sweden) Jonas Björkman (Belarus) Max Mirnyi	6–4, 6–2
Loss	36–23	Oct 2004	Moscow, Russia	Carpet	(Sweden) Jonas Björkman	(Russia) Igor Andreev (Russia) Nikolay Davydenko	6–3, 3–6, 4–6
Loss	36–24	Jan 2005	Chennai, India	Hard	(Sweden) Jonas Björkman	(Chinese Taipei) Yen-Hsun Lu (Germany) Rainer Schüttler	5–7, 6–4, 6–7
Win	37–24	Jan 2005	Sydney, Australia	Hard	(Australia) Todd Woodbridge	(France) Arnaud Clément (France) Michaël Llodra	6–3, 6–3
Win	38–24	Sep 2006	Beijing, China	Hard	(Croatia) Mario Ančić	(Germany) Michael Berrer (Denmark) Kenneth Carlsen	6–4, 6–3
Win	39–24	Oct 2006	Mumbai, India	Hard	(Croatia) Mario Ančić	(India) Rohan Bopanna (India) Mustafa Ghouse	6–4, 6–7, [10–8]
Loss	39–25	Mar 2007	Dubai, United Arab Emirates	Hard	(Czech Republic) Radek Štěpánek	(France) Fabrice Santoro (Serbia) Nenad Zimonjić	5–7, 7–6, [7–10]
Win	40–25	Aug 2007	Montréal, Canada	Hard	(Czech Republic) Pavel Vízner	(Australia) Paul Hanley (Zimbabwe) Kevin Ullyett	6–4, 6–4
Win	41–25	Aug 2007	New Haven, United States	Hard	(Serbia) Nenad Zimonjić	(Poland) Mariusz Fyrstenberg (Poland) Marcin Matkowski	6–3, 6–3
Win	42–25	Mar 2008	Memphis, United States	Hard (i)	(The Bahamas) Mark Knowles	(Thailand) Sanchai Ratiwatana (Thailand) Sonchat Ratiwatana	7–6, 6–2
Win	43–25	Mar 2008	Dubai, United Arab Emirates	Hard	(The Bahamas) Mark Knowles	(Czech Republic) Martin Damm (Czech Republic) Pavel Vízner	7–5, 7–6
Loss	43–26	Mar 2008	Miami, United States	Hard	(The Bahamas) Mark Knowles	(United States) Bob Bryan (United States) Mike Bryan	2–6, 2–6
Loss	43–27	Apr 2008	Monte Carlo, Monaco	Clay	(The Bahamas) Mark Knowles	(Spain) Rafael Nadal (Spain) Tommy Robredo	3–6, 3–6
Loss	43–28	Jun 2008	s'Hertogenbosch, Netherlands	Grass	(India) Leander Paes	(Croatia) Mario Ančić (Austria) Jürgen Melzer	6–7, 3–6
Loss	43–29	Aug 2008	New Haven, United States	Hard	(The Bahamas) Mark Knowles	(Brazil) Marcelo Melo (Brazil) André Sá	5–7, 2–6
Loss	43–30	Oct 2008	Madrid, Spain	Hard (i)	(The Bahamas) Mark Knowles	(Poland) Mariusz Fyrstenberg (Poland) Marcin Matkowski	4–6, 2–6
Win	44–30	Oct 2008	Basel, Switzerland	Carpet	(The Bahamas) Mark Knowles	(Germany) Christopher Kas (Germany) Philipp Kohlschreiber	6–3, 6–3
Loss	44–31	Jan 2009	Melbourne, Australia	Hard	(The Bahamas) Mark Knowles	(United States) Bob Bryan (United States) Mike Bryan	6–2, 5–7, 0–6
Loss	44–32	Apr 2009	Barcelona, Spain	Clay	(The Bahamas) Mark Knowles	(Canada) Daniel Nestor (Serbia) Nenad Zimonjić	3–6, 6–7
Win	45–32	Aug 2009	Montréal, Canada	Hard	(The Bahamas) Mark Knowles	(Belarus) Max Mirnyi (Israel) Andy Ram	6–4, 6–3
Loss	45–33	Sep 2009	New York, United States	Hard	(The Bahamas) Mark Knowles	(Czech Republic) Lukáš Dlouhý (India) Leander Paes	6–3, 3–6, 2–6
Loss	45–34	Apr 2010	Miami, United States	Hard	(Belarus) Max Mirnyi	(Czech Republic) Lukáš Dlouhý (India) Leander Paes	2–6, 5–7
Loss	45–35	Apr 2010	Monte Carlo, Monaco	Clay	(Belarus) Max Mirnyi	(Canada) Daniel Nestor (Serbia) Nenad Zimonjić	3–6, 0–2, RET.
Loss	45–36	Aug 2010	Cincinnati, United States	Hard	(Belarus) Max Mirnyi	(United States) Bob Bryan (United States) Mike Bryan	3–6, 4–6
Loss	45–37	Nov 2010	Valencia, Spain	Hard (i)	(Belarus) Max Mirnyi	(United Kingdom) Andy Murray (United Kingdom) Jamie Murray	6–7^{(8–10)}, 7–5, [7–10]
Win	46–37	Nov 2010	Paris, France	Hard (i)	(Belarus) Max Mirnyi	(The Bahamas) Mark Knowles (Israel) Andy Ram	7–5, 7–5
Loss	46–38	Nov 2010	London, United Kingdom	Hard (i)	(Belarus) Max Mirnyi	(Canada) Daniel Nestor (Serbia) Nenad Zimonjić	6–7^{(6–8)}, 4–6
Win	47–38	Jan 2011	Chennai, India	Hard	(India) Leander Paes	(Netherlands) Robin Haase (United States) David Martin	6–2, 6–7^{(3–7)}, [10–7]
Loss	47–39	Jan 2011	Melbourne, Australia	Hard	(India) Leander Paes	(United States) Bob Bryan (United States) Mike Bryan	3–6, 4–6
Win	48–39	Apr 2011	Miami, United States	Hard	(India) Leander Paes	(Belarus) Max Mirnyi (Canada) Daniel Nestor	6–7^{(5–7)}, 6–2, [10–5]
Loss	48–40	Jun 2011	London, United Kingdom	Grass	(India) Leander Paes	(United States) Bob Bryan (United States) Mike Bryan	7–6^{(7–2)}, 6–7^{(4–7)}, [6–10]
Win	49–40	Aug 2011	Cincinnati, United States	Hard	(India) Leander Paes	(France) Michaël Llodra (Serbia) Nenad Zimonjić	7–6^{(7–4)}, 7–6^{(7–2)}
Win	50–40	Mar 2012	Dubai, United Arab Emirates	Hard	(India) Rohan Bopanna	(Poland) Mariusz Fyrstenberg (Poland) Marcin Matkowski	6–4, 3–6, [10–5]
Loss	50–41	Aug 2012	Cincinnati, United States	Hard	(India) Rohan Bopanna	(Sweden) Robert Lindstedt (Romania) Horia Tecău	4–6, 4–6
Loss	50–42	Oct 2012	Shanghai, China	Hard	(India) Rohan Bopanna	(India) Leander Paes (Czech Republic) Radek Štěpánek	7–6^{(9–7)}, 3–6, [5–10]
Win	51–42	Nov 2012	Paris, France	Hard (i)	(India) Rohan Bopanna	(Pakistan) Aisam-ul-Haq Qureshi (Netherlands) Jean-Julien Rojer	7–6^{(8–6)}, 6–3
Loss	51–43	Nov 2012	London, United Kingdom	Hard (i)	(India) Rohan Bopanna	(Spain) Marcel Granollers (Spain) Marc López	5–7, 6–3, [3–10]
Win	52–43	Mar 2013	Dubai, United Arab Emirates	Hard	(France) Michaël Llodra	(Sweden) Robert Lindstedt (Serbia) Nenad Zimonjić	7–6^{(8–6)}, 7–6^{(8–6)}
Loss	52–44	May 2013	Rome, Italy	Clay	(India) Rohan Bopanna	(United States) Bob Bryan (United States) Mike Bryan	2–6, 3–6

== Performance timelines ==
Key
W	F	SF	QF	#R	RR	Q#	DNQ	A	NH

(W) winner; (F) finalist; (SF) semifinalist; (QF) quarterfinalist; (#R) rounds 4, 3, 2, 1; (RR) round-robin stage; (Q#) qualification round; (DNQ) did not qualify; (A) absent; (NH) not held; (SR) strike rate (events won / competed); (W–L) win–loss record.

=== Doubles ===
Tournament	1995	1996	1997	1998	1999	2000	2001	2002	2003	2004	2005	2006	2007	2008	2009	2010	2011	2012	2013	2014	2015	2016	W–L
Grand Slam tournaments
Australian Open	A	A	1R	SF	F	A	1R	2R	1R	QF	QF	3R	QF	SF	F	1R	F	3R	3R	2R	1R	2R	41–19
French Open	A	A	2R	SF	W	2R	W	SF	QF	SF	1R	QF	SF	1R	3R	2R	2R	1R	1R	A	1R	A	40–16
Wimbledon	Q1	Q2	1R	2R	W	3R	1R	QF	F	3R	2R	1R	A	1R	QF	3R	2R	2R	QF	A	1R	A	29–16
US Open	2R	Q1	SF	SF	F	1R	1R	W	QF	3R	3R	1R	2R	3R	F	2R	QF	1R	1R	A	A	A	38–17
Win–loss	1–1	0–0	5–4	13–4	22–2	3–3	6–3	14–3	10–4	10–4	6–4	5–4	8–3	6–4	15–4	4–4	10–4	3–4	5–4	1–1	0–3	1–1	148–68
Year-end championship
Masters Cup	DNQ		F	RR	F	F	NH	RR	RR	RR	Did not qualify			RR	SF	F	SF	F	Did not qualify				24–23
Olympic Games
Summer Olympics	NH	2R	Not Held			2R	Not Held			4th	Not Held			QF	Not Held			2R	Not Held			A	8–6
ATP Masters Series
Indian Wells	A	A	A	A	SF	A	1R	2R	2R	SF	1R	1R	1R	QF	2R	1R	2R	1R	1R	A	A	A	11–14
Miami	A	Q1	2R	1R	2R	A	A	QF	1R	2R	QF	A	1R	F	1R	F	W	SF	2R	1R	A	A	23–14
Monte Carlo	A	A	A	SF	2R	A	SF	1R	W	QF	QF	SF	2R	F	QF	F	A	2R	A	A	A	A	22–13
Madrid	Not Held							F	W	SF	QF	1R	A	F	2R	A	A	SF	QF	A	1R	2R	16–10
Rome	A	A	A	W	1R	1R	1R	QF	SF	W	SF	2R	1R	2R	SF	2R	2R	SF	F	A	A	A	21–14
Canada	A	A	W	SF	A	QF	1R	2R	W	W	QF	A	W	QF	W	SF	2R	2R	A	A	A	A	28–9
Cincinnati	A	A	QF	1R	2R	1R	W	F	SF	QF	QF	2R	2R	SF	SF	F	W	F	A	A	A	A	27–14
Shanghai	Not Held														SF	QF	SF	F	A	A	A	A	8–4
Paris	A	A	1R	W	2R	1R	F	2R	A	SF	A	A	A	2R	2R	W	2R	W	A	A	A	A	16–9
Hamburg	A	A	A	QF	2R	2R	1R	W	F	2R	QF	1R	2R	2R	Not Masters Series								12–9
Stuttgart	A	A	QF	F	A	2R	QF	Not Held															6–4
Win–loss	0–0	0–0	9–4	17–6	2–6	4–6	12–7	18–8	19–5	17–7	9–8	4–6	7–6	12–9	12–8	16–7	11–5	16–8	5–5	0–1	0–1	1–1	190–114
Career statistics
	1995	1996	1997	1998	1999	2000	2001	2002	2003	2004	2005	2006	2007	2008	2009	2010	2011	2012	2013	2014	2015	2016	Career
Titles / Finals	0 / 0	0 / 0	6 / 8	6 / 8	3 / 6	2 / 4	4 / 8	5 / 9	5 / 10	5 / 6	1 / 2	2 / 2	2 / 3	3 / 8	1 / 4	1 / 6	3 / 5	2 / 5	1 / 2	0 / 0	0 / 0	0 / 0	52 / 96
Year-end ranking	162	106	11	3	2	39	6	4	4	7	19	30	21	6	7	6	7	11	35	344	699	186	

=== Mixed doubles ===
Tournament	1997	1998	1999	2000	2001	2002	2003	2004	2005	2006	2007	2008	2009	2010	2011	2012	2013	2014	2015	SR
Grand Slam tournaments
Australian Open	A	SF	2R	A	2R	SF	QF	1R	A	W	1R	F	W	A	QF	SF	QF	2R	1R	2 / 15
French Open	W	2R	QF	A	SF	QF	F	1R	QF	2R	1R	SF	1R	1R	2R	W	1R	A	A	2 / 16
Wimbledon	3R	F	2R	1R	SF	W	3R	QF	W	2R	2R	2R	3R	2R	F	2R	1R	A	1R	2 / 18
US Open	1R	QF	W	1R	1R	2R	2R	2R	W	A	QF	2R	SF	1R	1R	2R	1R	A	A	2 / 16
SR	1 / 3	0 / 4	1 / 4	0 / 2	0 / 4	1 / 4	0 / 4	0 / 4	2 / 3	1 / 3	0 / 4	0 / 4	1 / 4	0 / 3	0 / 4	1 / 4	0 / 4	0 / 1	0 / 2	8 / 65

== Grand Slam seedings ==
The tournaments won by Bhupathi are in boldface, and advanced into finals by Bhupathi are in italics.

=== Men's doubles ===
Not seeded at all, or not seeded inside the top 10 Seeded 10–4 Seeded no. 3 Seeded no. 2 Seeded no. 1

Legend seeded No. 1 (**2** / 6) seeded No. 2 (0 / 3) seeded No. 3 (**1** / 14) seeded No. 4–10 (0 / 29) seeded No. 11–16 (0 / 2) unseeded (**1** / 16)	Longest streak 4 1 4 8 1 3

Year	Australian Open	French Open	Wimbledon	US Open
1995	did not play	did not play	did not qualify	unseeded
1996	did not play	did not play	did not qualify	did not qualify
1997	unseeded	unseeded	unseeded	10th
1998	2nd	3rd	3rd	4th
1999	1st (1)	**1st (1)**	**1st (2)**	1st (2)
2000	did not play	9th	10th	unseeded
2001	unseeded	**unseeded (3)**	6th	5th
2002	3rd	3rd	3rd	**3rd (4)**
2003	6th	2nd	1st (3)	1st
2004	2nd	3rd	3rd	4th
2005	3rd	4th	6th	7th
2006	11th	unseeded	13th	unseeded
2007	unseeded	unseeded	did not play	6th
2008	6th	4th	4th	4th
2009	3rd (4)	4th	4th	3rd (5)
2010	4th	5th	4th	4th
2011	3rd (6)	3rd	3rd	4th
2012	4th	6th	7th	8th
2013	5th	4th	8th	unseeded
2014	unseeded	did not play	did not play	did not play
2015	protected ranking	protected ranking	protected ranking	did not play
2016	protected ranking	did not play	did not play	did not play

=== Mixed doubles ===
Not seeded at all, or not seeded inside the top 10 Seeded 10–4 Seeded no. 3 Seeded no. 2 Seeded no. 1

Legend seeded No. 1 (0 / 6) seeded No. 2 (**1** / 3) seeded No. 3 (**1** / 8) seeded No. 4–10 (**1** / 20) seeded No. 11–16 (**1** / 5) unseeded (**4** / 23)	Longest streak 2 1 3 9 2 6

Year	Australian Open	French Open	Wimbledon	US Open
1997	did not play	**16th (1)**	15th	8th
1998	4th	3rd	5th (1)	5th
1999	4th	3rd	unseeded	**2nd (2)**
2000	did not play	did not play	Wild card	5th
2001	7th	unseeded	4th	6th
2002	2nd	3rd	**3rd (3)**	3rd
2003	unseeded	3rd (2)	1st	1st
2004	2nd	1st	1st	3rd
2005	did not play	7th	**unseeded (4)**	**unseeded (5)**
2006	**Wild card (6)**	unseeded	11th	did not play
2007	unseeded	unseeded	unseeded	unseeded
2008	unseeded (3)	unseeded	11th	unseeded
2009	**Wild card (7)**	unseeded	13th	1st
2010	did not play	1st	3rd	unseeded
2011	unseeded	5th	4th (4)	6th
2012	6th	**7th (8)**	5th	6th
2013	5th	7th	unseeded	Wild card
2014	8th	did not play	did not play	did not play
2015	Wild card	did not play	unseeded	did not play

== Davis Cup and Asian Games ==
Bhupathi has donned Indian colours numerous times for the Davis Cup as well as other international tournaments, including the Asian Games.

Bhupathi has played 55 matches for India in the Davis Cup (from 1995 to 2011), winning 35 and losing 20. Out of the 35 matches that he won, 27 of his victories came in doubles matches.

In 2006, Bhupathi won the doubles championship with Leander Paes at the Asian Games in Doha.

== Personal life ==
In 2001, he was awarded the Padma Shri, one of India's highest civilian awards. Bhupathi is an alumnus of the University of Mississippi in the United States. He is the founder of Globosport India private Limited which he started in 2002 as a sports and entertainment agency.

He married model Shvetha Jaishankar in 2002 but the couple got divorced in 2010 after eight years of marriage.

Bhupathi started dating Miss Universe 2000 Lara Dutta in 2009, while still being married to Shvetha. They got engaged in September 2010. He married her in a civil ceremony on 16 February 2011 in Mumbai. It was followed by a Christian ceremony on 20 February 2011 at Sunset Point in Goa. On 1 August 2011, Dutta confirmed that she was pregnant with their first child. Their daughter Saira was born on 20 January 2012.

In 2010, the couple started a film production company, Big Daddy Productions. In 2014, Mahesh Bhupathi launched an authentic Indian sports brand, ZEVEN. The company currently endorses Ravindra Jadeja, Rohan Bopanna, Shikhar Dhawan and Mary Kom, amongst others.

== Partnerships ==
=== Partners in doubles ===
No.	Partner	Year
1	(India) Leander Paes	1994–2006 2008–2011
2	(Belgium) Dick Norman	1994
3	(Indonesia) Sulistyo Wibowo	1995
4	(United States) Jeff Belloli	1995
5	(Australia) Peter Tramacchi	1995–1996, 1998–1999
6	(South Africa) Chris Haggard	1995–1996, 2006
7	(United Kingdom) Ross Matheson	1995
8	(United States) Robert Devens	1995
9	(Lebanon) Ali Hamadeh	1995–1996
10	(Portugal) João Cunha-Silva	1995
11	(Sweden) Tomas Nydahl	1996
12	(Australia) Jamie Holmes	1996
13	(Serbia and Montenegro) Nebojsa Djordjevic	1996
14	(Zimbabwe) Wayne Black	1996–1997
15	(United States) Kent Kinnear	1996
16	(France) Jean-Philippe Fleurian	1997
17	(United States) Tommy Ho	1997
18	(United States) Rick Leach	1997
19	(India) Sandeep Kirtane	1997
20	(India) Fazaluddin Syed	1998, 2000–2001
21	(The Bahamas) Mark Knowles	1998, 2000, 2008–2009, 2011
22	(Russia) Yevgeny Kafelnikov	1998
23	(Turkey) Baris Ergun	1998
24	(Netherlands) Paul Haarhuis	1998
25	(India) Srinath Prahlad	1998
26	(India) Gaurav Natekar	1998
27	(Italy) Mosé Navarra	1999, 2001
28	(United Kingdom) Tim Henman	1999, 2003, 2007
29	(Romania) Andrei Pavel	1999
30	(South Africa) Wayne Ferreira	1999
31	(Australia) Andrew Florent	1999
32	(Australia) Wayne Arthurs	2000
33	(Australia) Andrew Kratzmann	2000
34	(Germany) David Prinosil	2000
35	(Zimbabwe) Kevin Ullyett	2000
36	(Serbia) Nenad Zimonjić	2000, 2002, 2007, 2012
37	(United States) Scott Humphries	2000
38	(Zimbabwe) Byron Black	2000
39	(Slovakia) Dominik Hrbatý	2001
40	(Canada) Sébastien Lareau	2001
41	(United States) Jeff Tarango	2001–2002
42	(Thailand) Vittaya Samrej	2001
43	(United States) Jan-Michael Gambill	2002, 2004
44	(United States) Brian MacPhie	2002
45	(Belarus) Max Mirnyi	2002–2004, 2010
46	(Australia) Todd Woodbridge	2002–2003, 2005
47	(United States) Mike Bryan	2002
48	(Sweden) Jonas Björkman	2002, 2004–2005
49	(Australia) Joshua Eagle	2003
50	(India) Rohan Bopanna	2003, 2007–2013
51	(Russia) Dmitry Tursunov	2004
52	(France) Fabrice Santoro	2004, 2006–2007
53	(Australia) Paul Hanley	2004, 2007
54	(Chile) Fernando González	2005
55	(Czech Republic) Martin Damm	2005
56	(United States) Justin Gimelstob	2005–2007
57	(South Africa) Wesley Moodie	2006
58	(Czech Republic) Radek Štěpánek	2006–2007
59	(Czech Republic) Leoš Friedl	2006
60	(United States) Robby Ginepri	2006
61	(Austria) Julian Knowle	2006, 2013
62	(Belgium) Xavier Malisse	2006
63	(Germany) Alexander Waske	2006
64	(Croatia) Mario Ančić	2006
65	(United States) James Blake	2006
66	(Czech Republic) Pavel Vízner	2007
67	(United Kingdom) Jamie Murray	2007
68	(Spain) Marcel Granollers	2011
69	(Slovakia) Michal Mertiňák	2011
70	(Canada) Daniel Nestor	2013
71	(France) Michaël Llodra	2013
72	(Germany) Philipp Petzschner	2013
73	(Sweden) Robert Lindstedt	2013
74	(United States) Rajeev Ram	2014
75	(Uzbekistan) Denis Istomin	2014
75	(South Africa) Kevin Anderson	2014
76	(India) Saketh Myneni	2015
77	(Austria) Jürgen Melzer	2015
78	(Russia) Mikhail Youzhny	2015
79	(Australia) Nick Kyrgios	2015
80	(Colombia) Juan Sebastián Cabal	2015
81	(Serbia) Janko Tipsarević	2015
82.	(Luxembourg) Gilles Müller	2016
83.	(India) Purav Raja	2016
84.	(United Kingdom) Jonathan Marray	2016
85.	(India) Yuki Bhambri	2016

=== Partners in mixed doubles ===
No.	Partner	Year	Australian Open	French Open	Wimbledon	US Open
1	(Japan) Rika Hiraki	1997	check	check	check	check
2	(Netherlands) Caroline Vis	1998	check			
3	(Australia) Rennae Stubbs	1998		check		
4	(Croatia) Mirjana Lučić	1998 1999	check		check	check
5	(Japan) Ai Sugiyama	1999 2000 2001	check	check		check
6	(Australia) Annabel Ellwood	1999			check	
7	(United States) Martina Navratilova				check	
8	(Russia) Elena Likhovtseva	2001 2002 2003 2004	check	check	check	check
9	(Socialist Federal Republic of Yugoslavia) Jelena Dokić	2001				check
10	(Uzbekistan) Iroda Tulyaganova	2003	check			
11	(Argentina) Paola Suárez	2003, 2007		check	check	check
12	(United States) Lisa Raymond	2004 2005			check	check
13	(France) Mary Pierce	2005			check	
14	(Slovakia) Daniela Hantuchová	2005 2007 2010 2013	check		check	check
15	(Switzerland) Martina Hingis	2006 2013	check	check		
16	(China) Yan Zi	2006			check	
17	(India) Sania Mirza	2007 2008 2009 2011 2012	check	check	check	check
18	(China) Zheng Jie	2008 2011		check		
19	(Australia) Samantha Stosur	2008				check
20	(United States) Liezel Huber	2009 2010			check	check
21	(Australia) Anastasia Rodionova	2011	check			
22	(Russia) Elena Vesnina	2011 2014	check		check	
23	(Czech Republic) Andrea Hlaváčková	2012				check
24	(Russia) Nadia Petrova	2013	check			
25	(Australia) Casey Dellacqua	2013		check		
26	(Australia) Jarmila Gajdošová	2015	check			
27.	(Russia) Alla Kudryavtseva	2015			check	

- These lists only consists of players who played with Mahesh Bhupathi in ATP(& ITF)-recognized tournaments which include the Olympics, Grand Slams, World Tour Finals, World Tour Masters, World Tour Series, Davis Cup Ties, and ATP Challengers. The lists might be incomplete when all the other tournaments are considered. The order of the players in the list is based on their first partnering with Mahesh Bhupathi.

=== Other partners ===
==== India – Asian Games/Commonwealth Games/Other Events ====
- (India) Leander Paes

== Partnership with Leander Paes ==
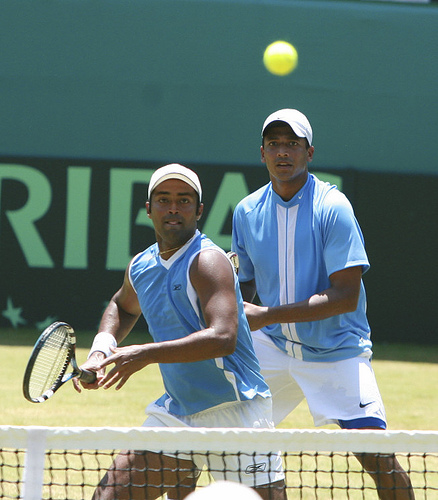
Bhupathi (right) and Leander Paes

Bhupathi and Leander Paes partnered in the men's doubles event at the 2008 Summer Olympics in Beijing, but lost the quarterfinals, to Roger Federer and Stanislas Wawrinka of Switzerland, who went on to win the gold medal.

Paes and Bhupathi decided to team up again at the Australian Open 2011, ending a nine-year separation on the ATP circuit. They reached the finals of the event, but lost to American twins Bob and Mike Bryan. Paes stated at the time that the best thing has been to have their friendship back.

The Indian duo has a 303–103 career record together. They have a Davis Cup record of longest winning streak in doubles, with 23 straight wins.

Leander Paes wanted to play with Mahesh Bhupathi in the men's doubles event of the London Olympics, to be held July–August 2012. On 19 June 2012, the All India Tennis association relented to the demands of Bhupathi and Bopanna of not playing along Paes. Two teams were sent for the London Olympics- 2012, with Mahesh Bhupathi and Rohan Bopanna as one team and the other team consisting of Leander Paes and Vishnu Vardhan. Bhupathi also accused AITA of using Sania Mirza as bait for Leander's participation in the Olympics. When AITA relented to the wishes of Bhupathi and Bopanna and permitted them to play together, they lost in the second round to the unseeded French pairing of Richard Gasquet and Julien Benneteau.

=== Davis Cup record ===
The duo of Bhupathi and Paes has the longest doubles streak in Davis Cup history.

SL	Year	Opponent	Result
1	1995	(Croatia) Saša Hiršzon / Goran Ivanišević	W
2	1996	(Netherlands) Jacco Eltingh / Paul Haarhuis	L
3	1996	(Sweden) Jonas Björkman / Nicklas Kulti	L
4	1997	(Czech Republic) Martin Damm / Petr Korda	W
5	1997	(Chile) Nicolás Massú / Marcelo Ríos	W
6	1998	(United Kingdom) Neil Broad / Tim Henman	W
7	1999	(South Korea) Kim Dong-hyun / Hyung-Taik Lee	W
8	1999	(China) Shan Jiang / Zhu Benqiang	W
9	2001	(China) Ran Xu / Jing-Zhu Yang	W
10	2001	(Japan) Thomas Shimada / Takao Suzuki	W
11	2001	(United States) Donald Johnson / Jared Palmer	W
12	2002	(Lebanon) Patrick Chucri / Ali Hamadeh	W
13	2002	(New Zealand) James Shortall / Daniel Willman	W
14	2003	(Japan) Jun Kato / Thomas Shimada	W
15	2003	(New Zealand) Alistair Hunt / Mark Nielsen	W
16	2004	(New Zealand) Mark Nielsen / Matt Prentice	W
17	2004	(Japan) Thomas Shimada / Takahiro Terachi	W
18	2005	(China) Wang Yu / Zhu Benqiang	W
19	2005	(Uzbekistan) Murad Inoyatov / Denis Istomin	W
20	2005	(Sweden) Simon Aspelin / Jonas Björkman	W
21	2006	(South Korea) Woong-Sun Jun / Oh-Hee Kwon	W
22	2006	(Pakistan) Jalil Khan / Asim Shafik	W
23	2008	(Japan) Satoshi Iwabuchi / Takao Suzuki	W
24	2008	(Romania) Adrian Cruciat / Horia Tecău	W
25	2009	(Chinese Taipei) Tsung-Hua Yang / Chu-Huan Yi	W
26	2010	(Russia) Teymuraz Gabashvili / Igor Kunitsyn	W
27	2010	(Brazil) Marcelo Melo / Bruno Soares	W

== Sports management and e-commerce ==
Bhupathi has also been involved in developing tennis facilities in India and, along with his company Globosport, has played a key role in developing and managing the careers of many Indian athletes, including Sania Mirza.

== International Premier Tennis League ==
Mahesh Bhupathi announced the founding of the International Premier Tennis League on 25 May 2013, in Paris. The initial plan was to start the league with six charter franchises in Asia with the inaugural season commencing in November 2014. Bhupathi said the league would be modeled after the Indian Premier League, a cricket league in India. Justin Gimelstob said that the league would be star-driven as World Team Tennis was in the 1970s.

== In popular culture ==
Break Point – A documentary series on ZEE5, released in 2021 unfolding the ups and downs in the relationship between Leander Paes and Mahesh Bhupathi.

== Awards ==
- Padma Shri, 2001
- Sports people for Change Karmaveer Puraskaar, 2007, iCONGO-Confederation of NGOs
- Davis Cup Commitment Award
- Kempegowda Award by Govt of Karnataka - 2025

== See also ==
Forca Kochi FC
