= 2007 Sony Ericsson Open – Girls' singles =

Girls' singles
- 2007 Miami Masters

Final
- Champion: (Romania) S Cîrstea
- Runner-up: (Russia) A Pivovarova
- Score: 6–2, 6–1

Events
Singles	men	women	boys	girls
Doubles	men	women
← 2006 ·	Miami Masters	· 2008 →

The girls' singles section of the 2007 Sony Ericsson Open (also known as the "2007 Miami Masters"), a tennis tournament, was won by the first seed Sorana Cîrstea of Romania.

== Seeds ==
All seeds receive a bye into the second round.

1. (Romania) Sorana Cîrstea (champion)
2. (United Kingdom) Naomi Cavaday (quarterfinals, retired)
3. (Russia) Anastasia Pivovarova (final)
4. (Belgium) Tamaryn Hendler (quarterfinals)

== Draw ==
=== Key ===
- Q = Qualifier
- WC = Wild card
- LL = Lucky loser
- Alt = Alternate
- SE = Special exempt
- PR = Protected ranking
- ITF = ITF entry
- JE = Junior exempt
- w/o = Walkover
- r = Retired
- d = Defaulted
- SR = Special ranking

=== Finals ===
First round
(Italy) Burnett	3	0
(United States) Boserup	6	6
(Croatia) Martić	6	6
Unknown Name	2	4
(United States) Will	5	6	6
(Russia) Mokh	7	4	4
(Netherlands) Bolender	3	2
(United States) Hampton	6	6

Quarterfinals
1	(Romania) Cîrstea	7^{7}	6
(United States) Boserup	6^{1}	1
4	(Belgium) Hendler	3	1
(Croatia) Martić	6	6
(United States) Will	4	4
3	(Russia) Pivovarova	6	6
(United States) Hampton	3	6	2r
2	(United Kingdom) Cavaday	6	4	1

Semifinals
1	(Romania) Cîrstea	7^{7}	6
(Croatia) Martić	6^{2}	3
3	(Russia) Pivovarova	6	7
(United States) Hampton	2	5

Finals
1	(Romania) Cîrstea	6	6
3	(Russia) Pivovarova	2	1
