= 2007 Sony Ericsson Open – Boys' singles =

Competition at an American tennis tournament

Boys' singles
- 2007 Sony Ericsson Open

Final
- Champion: (Japan) K Nishikori
- Runner-up: (United States) M McClune
- Score: 6–4, 6–1

Events
| Singles | men | women |
| Doubles | men | women |
| ← 2006 · | Sony Ericsson Open | · 2008 → |

The boys' singles event at the 2007 Sony Ericsson Open was won by Kei Nishikori of Japan.

== Seeds ==
All seeds receive a bye into the second round.

1. (Brazil) Fernando Romboli (quarterfinals)
2. (Lithuania) Ričardas Berankis (semifinals)
3. (Chile) Guillermo Rivera (quarterfinals)
4. (Japan) Kei Nishikori (champion)

== Draw ==
=== Key ===
- Q = Qualifier
- WC = Wild card
- LL = Lucky loser
- Alt = Alternate
- SE = Special exempt
- PR = Protected ranking
- ITF = ITF entry
- JE = Junior exempt
- w/o = Walkover
- r = Retired
- d = Defaulted
- SR = Special ranking

=== Finals ===
First round
(United States) McClune | 6 | 7
(Australia) Reid | 0 | 5
(Italy) Miccini | 3 | 6 | 1
(Portugal) Elias | 6 | 3 | 6
(Argentina) Pella | 6^{5} | 3
(United States) Hochwalt | 7^{7} | 6
(United States) Britton | 6^{2} | 6 | 7^{8}
(United States) Krajicek | 7^{7} | 2 | 6^{6}

Quarterfinals
1 | (Brazil) Romboli | 4 | 0
(United States) McClune | 6 | 6
3 | (Chile) Rivera | 3 | 3
(Portugal) Elias | 6 | 6
(United States) Hochwalt | 5 | 3
4 | (Japan) Nishikori | 7 | 6
(United States) Britten | 3 | 4
2 | (Lithuania) Berankis | 6 | 6'

Semifinals
(United States) McClune | 1 | r
(Portugal) Elias | 2
4 | (Japan) Nishikori | 6 | 6
2 | (Lithuania) Berankis | 2 | 3

Finals
(United States) McClune | 7^{7} | 4 | 1
4 | (Japan) Nishikori | 6^{2} | 6 | 6
