= 2000 U.S. Men's Clay Court Championships – Singles =

Singles
- 2000 U.S. Men's Clay Court Championships

Final
- Champion: (Chile) Fernando González
- Runner-up: (Chile) Nicolás Massú
- Score: 6–2, 6–3

Details
- Draw: 32 (4Q/3WC)
- Seeds: 8

Events
| Singles | Doubles |
- U.S. Men's Clay Court Championships

Magnus Norman was the defending champion, but did not compete this year.

Qualifier Fernando González won the first title of his career by defeating his compatriot Nicolás Massú 6–2, 6–3 in the final.

== Seeds ==
A champion seed is indicated in bold text while text in italics indicates the round in which that seed was eliminated.

1. (Australia) Andrew Ilie (first round)
2. (United States) Jan-Michael Gambill (first round)
3. (Italy) Gianluca Pozzi (quarterfinals)
4. (Australia) Jason Stoltenberg (second round)
5. (United States) Paul Goldstein (second round)
6. (Chile) Nicolás Massú (final)
7. (Brazil) André Sá (first round)
8. (United States) Justin Gimelstob (first round)

== Draw ==
Key

- Q = Qualifier
- WC = Wild card
- LL = Lucky loser
- Alt = Alternate
- ITF = ITF entry
- PR = Protected ranking
- SR = Special ranking
- SE = Special exempt
- JE = Junior exempt
- JR = Junior Accelerator Programme entrant
- CO = College Accelerator Programme entrant
- NG = Next Gen Accelerator Program entrant
- w/o = Walkover
- r = Retired
- d = Defaulted

First round
1 | (Australia) A Ilie | **6** | 6^{6} | 6^{4}
(France) **A Dupuis** | 3 | **7^{8}** | **7^{7}**
WC | (Philippines) C Mamiit | 2 | 5
Q | (Chile) **F González** | **6** | **7**
(Thailand) **P Srichaphan** | **6** | **6**
(Canada) S Lareau | 1 | 3
(Netherlands) **J Siemerink** | 4 | **6** | **7**
8 | (United States) J Gimelstob | **6** | 2 | 5
4 | (Australia) **J Stoltenberg** | **6** | **6**
(Spain) Á López Morón | 1 | 4
(Czech Republic) **J Vaněk** | 6^{2} | **6** | **6**
(Australia) W Arthurs | **7^{7}** | 4 | 3
(Switzerland) L Manta | **7^{9}** | 6^{2} | 6^{3}
(Argentina) **M Rodríguez** | 6^{7} | **7^{7}** | **7^{7}**
(Haiti) R Agénor | 2 | 1
5 | (United States) **P Goldstein** | **6** | **6**
6 | (Chile) **N Massú** | **6** | **6**
(Italy) L Tieleman | 2 | 3
(Slovakia) **J Krošlák** | **6** | 3 | **7^{7}**
(Sweden) F Jonsson | 1 | **6** | 6^{4}
WC | (United States) **M Russell** | **6** | **6**
WC | (United States) H Armando | 4 | 2
(Germany) A Popp | 3 | 2
3 | (Italy) **G Pozzi** | **6** | **6**
7 | (Brazil) A Sá | 3 | 5
Q | (Romania) **R Sabău** | **6** | **7**
(Czech Republic) T Zíb | **6** | 4 | 4
(Germany) **M Hantschk** | 4 | **6** | **6**
(India) L Paes | 3 | 2
Q | (Belgium) **X Malisse** | **6** | **6**
Q | (Paraguay) **R Delgado** | 5 | **7** | **6**
2 | (United States) J-M Gambill | **7** | 5 | 4

Second round
(France) A Dupuis | 5 | 6^{4}
Q | (Chile) **F González** | **7** | **7^{7}**
(Thailand) **P Srichaphan** | **7** | **6**
(Netherlands) J Siemerink | 5 | 3
4 | (Australia) J Stoltenberg | 6^{6} | **6** | 4
(Czech Republic) **J Vaněk** | **7^{8}** | 4 | **6**
(Argentina) **M Rodríguez** | **6** | **6**
5 | (United States) P Goldstein | 4 | 2
6 | (Chile) **N Massú** | **6** | **6**
(Slovakia) J Krošlák | 4 | 2
WC | (United States) M Russell | **7^{7}** | 2 | 0
3 | (Italy) **G Pozzi** | 6^{4} | **6** | **6**
Q | (Romania) R Sabău | **6** | 5 | 3
(Germany) **M Hantschk** | 3 | **7** | **6**
Q | (Belgium) X Malisse | 5 | 4
Q | (Paraguay) **R Delgado** | **7** | **6**

Quarterfinals
Q | (Chile) **F González** | **6** | **6**
(Thailand) P Srichaphan | 3 | 3
(Czech Republic) J Vaněk | 3 | 5
(Argentina) **M Rodríguez** | **6** | **7**
6 | (Chile) **N Massú** | 2 | **6** | **6**
3 | (Italy) G Pozzi | **6** | 2 | 2
(Germany) M Hantschk | 5 | 4
Q | (Paraguay) **R Delgado** | **7** | **6**

Semifinals
Q | (Chile) **F González** | **6** | 3 | **7**
(Argentina) M Rodríguez | 0 | **6** | 5
6 | (Chile) **N Massú** | **6** | **6**
Q | (Paraguay) R Delgado | 4 | 4

Final
Q | (Chile) **Fernando González** | **6** | **6**
6 | (Chile) Nicolás Massú | 2 | 3

== Qualifying ==
=== Qualifying seeds ===
1. (Australia) James Sekulov (first round)
2. (Finland) Tuomas Ketola (first round)
3. (Belgium) **Xavier Malisse (qualified)**
4. (Argentina) Mariano Hood (qualifying competition)
5. (United Kingdom) Arvind Parmar (first round)
6. (Australia) Todd Woodbridge (first round)
7. (Peru) Luis Horna (second round, retired)
8. (United Kingdom) Barry Cowan (first round)

=== Qualifiers ===
1. **(Paraguay) Ramón Delgado**
2. **(Chile) Fernando González**
3. **(Belgium) Xavier Malisse**
4. **(Romania) Răzvan Sabău**

=== Qualifying draw ===
==== First qualifier ====
First round
1 | (Australia) James Sekulov | **6** | 6^{8} | 3
**(Austria) Herbert Wiltschnig** | 1 | **7^{10}** | **6**
**(Paraguay) Ramón Delgado** | **6** | **6**
(Germany) Christian Vinck | 3 | 2
(United States) James Blake | 2 | **7^{8}** | 4
**(United States) Bob Bryan** | **6** | 6^{6} | **6**
(United States) Eric Taino | 3 | 1
7 | **(Peru) Luis Horna** | **6** | **6**

Second round
(Austria) Herbert Wiltschnig | 2 | 3
**(Paraguay) Ramón Delgado** | **6** | **6**
**(United States) Bob Bryan** | **7^{8}** | 3
7 | (Peru) Luis Horna | 6^{6} | 4^{r}

Qualifying competition
**(Paraguay) Ramón Delgado** | 3 | **6** | **7**
(United States) Bob Bryan | **6** | 4 | 5

==== Second qualifier ====
First round
2 | (Finland) Tuomas Ketola | 4 | 4
**(Chile) Fernando González** | **6** | **6**
**(Italy) Giorgio Galimberti** | **6** | **6**
(Canada) Frédéric Niemeyer | 3 | 3
(Ecuador) Luis Morejón | 4 | **6** | 2
**(Argentina) Sebastián Prieto** | **6** | 4 | **6**
WC | **(United States) Thomas Blake** | **7** | **6**
8 | (United Kingdom) Barry Cowan | 5 | 4

Second round
**(Chile) Fernando González** | **6** | 6^{2} | **7^{8}**
(Italy) Giorgio Galimberti | 2 | **7^{7}** | 6^{6}
**(Argentina) Sebastián Prieto** | **6** | **6**
WC | (United States) Thomas Blake | 2 | 3

Qualifying competition
**(Chile) Fernando González** | **6** | **6**
(Argentina) Sebastián Prieto | 2 | 3

==== Third qualifier ====
First round
3 | **(Belgium) Xavier Malisse** | **6** | **6**
(Italy) Mosé Navarra | 2 | 1
WC | (United States) Phillip King | 3 | 4
**(Germany) Karsten Braasch** | **6** | **6**
(France) Guillaume Raoux | 4 | **6** | 3
**(United States) Mike Bryan** | **6** | 3 | **6**
**(United States) Taylor Dent** | **6** | **6**
5 | (United Kingdom) Arvind Parmar | 2 | 1

Second round
3 | **(Belgium) Xavier Malisse** | **6** | **6**
(Germany) Karsten Braasch | 1 | 2
**(United States) Mike Bryan** | **6** | **6**
(United States) Taylor Dent | 4 | 4

Qualifying competition
3 | **(Belgium) Xavier Malisse** | 1 | **6** | **6**
(United States) Mike Bryan | **6** | 4 | 0

==== Fourth qualifier ====
First round
4 | **(Argentina) Mariano Hood** | **6** | **6**
(United States) Kevin Kim | 4 | 3
WC | (United States) Jonathan Stark | **6** | 4 | 3
**(Brazil) Ricardo Schlachter** | 4 | **6** | **6**
WC | (United States) Jeff Salzenstein | 4 | 6^{3}
**(United States) Glenn Weiner** | **6** | **7^{7}**
**(Romania) Răzvan Sabău** | **7^{8}** | **7^{8}**
6 | (Australia) Todd Woodbridge | 6^{6} | 6^{6}

Second round
4 | **(Argentina) Mariano Hood** | **6** | **6**
(Brazil) Ricardo Schlachter | 1 | 4
(United States) Glenn Weiner | 5 | 4
**(Romania) Răzvan Sabău** | **7** | **6**

Qualifying competition
4 | (Argentina) Mariano Hood | **6** | 6^{3} | 4
**(Romania) Răzvan Sabău** | 2 | **7^{7}** | **6**
