= 2000 U.S. Men's Clay Court Championships – Doubles =

Doubles
- 2000 U.S. Men's Clay Court Championships

Final
- Champions: (India) Leander Paes (Netherlands) Jan Siemerink
- Runners-up: (United States) Justin Gimelstob (Canada) Sébastien Lareau
- Score: 6–3, 6–4

Details
- Draw: 16
- Seeds: 4

Events
Singles	Doubles
- U.S. Men's Clay Court Championships

Jim Courier and Todd Woodbridge were the defending champions, but Courier did not participate this year. Woodbridge partnered Mark Woodforde, losing in the quarterfinals.

Leander Paes and Jan Siemerink won the title, defeating Justin Gimelstob and Sébastien Lareau 6–3, 6–4 in the final.

== Seeds ==
1. (Australia) Todd Woodbridge / (Australia) Mark Woodforde (quarterfinals)
2. (United States) Justin Gimelstob / (Canada) Sébastien Lareau (final)
3. (Australia) Wayne Arthurs / (India) Mahesh Bhupathi (quarterfinals)
4. (United States) Jan-Michael Gambill / (United States) Scott Humphries (quarterfinals)

== Draw ==
Key

- Q = Qualifier
- WC = Wild card
- LL = Lucky loser
- Alt = Alternate
- ITF = ITF entry
- PR = Protected ranking
- SR = Special ranking
- SE = Special exempt
- JE = Junior exempt
- JR = Junior Accelerator Programme entrant
- CO = College Accelerator Programme entrant
- NG = Next Gen Accelerator Program entrant
- w/o = Walkover
- r = Retired
- d = Defaulted

=== Draw ===
First round
1	(Australia) T Woodbridge (Australia) M Woodforde	6	6
WC	(United States) J Blake (United States) T Blake	3	4
(India) L Paes (Netherlands) J Siemerink	4	7^{7}	6
Q	(The Bahamas) M Merklein (United States) M Sell	6	6^{5}	4
4	(United States) J-M Gambill (United States) S Humphries	7^{7}	6
(Argentina) M Hood (Argentina) S Prieto	6^{3}	1
(South Africa) J Coetzee (South Africa) B Haygarth	6	7
(Australia) D Macpherson (South Africa) G Stafford	4	5
WC	(United States) L Jensen (United States) C Mamiit	2	0
(United States) B Bryan (United States) M Bryan	6	6
(South Africa) L Bale (Australia) M Hill	4	1
3	(Australia) W Arthurs (India) M Bhupathi	6	6
WC	(United States) P Goldstein (United States) J Thomas	7^{7}	6
(United States) J Stark (United States) E Taino	6^{3}	2
(Australia) P Tramacchi (United States) J Waite	2	2
2	(United States) J Gimelstob (Canada) S Lareau	6	6

Quarterfinals
1	(Australia) T Woodbridge (Australia) M Woodforde	6^{10}	2
(India) L Paes (Netherlands) J Siemerink	7^{12}	6
4	(United States) J-M Gambill (United States) S Humphries	6	6^{3}	6^{4}
(South Africa) J Coetzee (South Africa) B Haygarth	4	7^{7}	7^{7}
(United States) B Bryan (United States) M Bryan	7	7^{7}
3	(Australia) W Arthurs (India) M Bhupathi	5	6^{4}
WC	(United States) P Goldstein (United States) J Thomas	6	3	2
2	(United States) J Gimelstob (Canada) S Lareau	3	6	6

Semifinals
(India) L Paes (Netherlands) J Siemerink	5	6	6
(South Africa) J Coetzee (South Africa) B Haygarth	7	3	2
(United States) B Bryan (United States) M Bryan	6	1	3
2	(United States) J Gimelstob (Canada) S Lareau	4	6	6

Final
(India) L Paes (Netherlands) J Siemerink	6	6
2	(United States) J Gimelstob (Canada) S Lareau	3	4
