= 2000 U.S. Men's Clay Court Championships =

- Date: May 1– 8
- Edition: 32nd
- Category: International Series
- Draw: 32S / 16D
- Prize money: $325,000
- Surface: Clay / outdoor
- Location: Orlando, Florida, U.S.

Champions

Singles
- (Chile) Fernando González

Doubles
- (India) Leander Paes / (Netherlands) Jan Siemerink
← 1999 ·	U.S. Men's Clay Court Championships	· 2001 →

The 2000 U.S. Men's Clay Court Championships was an Association of Tennis Professionals men's tennis tournament held on outdoor clay courts in Orlando, Florida in the United States. It was the 32nd edition of the tournament and was held from May 1 to May 8, 2000. Fernando González, who entered the main draw as a qualifier, won the singles title.

== Finals ==
=== Singles ===
(Chile) Fernando González defeated (Chile) Nicolás Massú 6–2, 6–3

- It was González's only title of the year and the 1st of his career.

=== Doubles ===
(India) Leander Paes / (Netherlands) Jan Siemerink defeated (United States) Justin Gimelstob / (Canada) Sébastien Lareau 6–3, 6–4

- It was Paes's 2nd title of the year and the 20th of his career. It was Siemerink's only title of the year and the 15th of his career.
