= 2008 Sony Ericsson Open – Men's doubles =

Men's doubles
- 2008 Sony Ericsson Open

Final
- Champions: (United States) Bob Bryan (United States) Mike Bryan
- Runners-up: (India) Mahesh Bhupathi (The Bahamas) Mark Knowles
- Score: 6–2, 6–2

Events
Singles	men	women
Doubles	men	women
← 2007 ·	Sony Ericsson Open	· 2009 →

Bob Bryan and Mike Bryan were the defending champions, and won in the final 6–2, 6–2, against Mahesh Bhupathi and Mark Knowles.

== Seeds ==
1. (United States) Bob Bryan / (United States) Mike Bryan (champions)
2. (Canada) Daniel Nestor / (Serbia) Nenad Zimonjić (first round)
3. (Israel) Jonathan Erlich / (Israel) Andy Ram (first round)
4. (India) Mahesh Bhupathi / (The Bahamas) Mark Knowles (final)
5. (Sweden) Simon Aspelin / (Austria) Julian Knowle (quarterfinals)
6. (Czech Republic) Martin Damm / (Czech Republic) Pavel Vízner (semifinals)
7. (France) Arnaud Clément / (France) Michaël Llodra (quarterfinals)
8. (Australia) Paul Hanley / (India) Leander Paes (quarterfinals)

== Draw ==
=== Key ===
- Q = Qualifier
- WC = Wild card
- LL = Lucky loser
- Alt = Alternate
- SE = Special exempt
- PR = Protected ranking
- ITF = ITF entry
- JE = Junior exempt
- w/o = Walkover
- r = Retired
- d = Defaulted
- SR = Special ranking

=== Finals ===
Semifinals
1	(United States) Bob Bryan (United States) Mike Bryan	6	6
(South Africa) Jeff Coetzee (South Africa) Wesley Moodie	1	4
4	(India) Mahesh Bhupathi (The Bahamas) Mark Knowles	7^{7}	4	[11]
6	(Czech Republic) Martin Damm (Czech Republic) Pavel Vízner	6^{5}	6	[9]

Final
1	(United States) Bob Bryan (United States) Mike Bryan	6	6
4	(India) Mahesh Bhupathi (The Bahamas) Mark Knowles	2	2

=== Top half ===
First round
1	(United States) B Bryan (United States) M Bryan	7^{7}	3	[10]
(Spain) R Nadal (Spain) T Robredo	6^{5}	6	[5]
(Sweden) J Björkman (Zimbabwe) K Ullyett	6	6
(Czech Republic) F Čermák (Russia) D Tursunov	4	4
WC	(Brazil) G Kuerten (Ecuador) N Lapentti	7^{7}	6
(Spain) F López (Spain) F Verdasco	6^{4}	2
WC	(United States) S Querrey (United States) R Sweeting	1	1
5	(Sweden) S Aspelin (Austria) J Knowle	6	6
3	(Israel) J Erlich (Israel) A Ram	6^{5}	4
(Brazil) M Melo (Brazil) A Sá	7^{7}	6
(Argentina) G Cañas (Argentina) S Prieto	3	3
(South Africa) J Coetzee (South Africa) W Moodie	6	6
(Belarus) M Mirnyi (United Kingdom) J Murray	4	4
(France) M Gicquel (France) F Santoro	6	6
(France) J Benneteau (France) N Mahut	3	4
7	(France) A Clément (France) M Llodra	6	6

Second round
1	(United States) B Bryan (United States) M Bryan	6	6^{6}	[10]
(Sweden) J Björkman (Zimbabwe) K Ullyett	1	7^{8}	[7]
WC	(Brazil) G Kuerten (Ecuador) N Lapentti	0	3
5	(Sweden) S Aspelin (Austria) J Knowle	6	6
(Brazil) M Melo (Brazil) A Sá	6	4	[6]
(South Africa) J Coetzee (South Africa) W Moodie	4	6	[10]
(France) M Gicquel (France) F Santoro	3	6^{4}
7	(France) A Clément (France) M Llodra	6	7^{7}

Quarterfinals
1	(United States) B Bryan (United States) M Bryan	6	6
5	(Sweden) S Aspelin (Austria) J Knowle	4	3
(South Africa) J Coetzee (South Africa) W Moodie	4	6	[10]
7	(France) A Clément (France) M Llodra	6	3	[5]

Semifinals
1	(United States) B Bryan (United States) M Bryan	6	6
(South Africa) J Coetzee (South Africa) W Moodie	1	4

=== Bottom half ===
First round
8	(Australia) P Hanley (India) L Paes	2	6	[10]
(Switzerland) Y Allegro (France) P-H Mathieu	6	0	[3]
(Czech Republic) L Friedl (Czech Republic) D Škoch	6	4	[4]
(Germany) C Kas (Netherlands) R Wassen	2	6	[10]
(Russia) I Andreev (Belgium) X Malisse	6	6
(Sweden) R Lindstedt (Finland) J Nieminen	0	3
(Czech Republic) T Berdych (Czech Republic) L Dlouhý	6	3	[5]
4	(India) M Bhupathi (The Bahamas) M Knowles	3	6	[10]
6	(Czech Republic) M Damm (Czech Republic) P Vízner	6	6
(United States) E Butorac (Australia) J Kerr	2	4
(Poland) M Fyrstenberg (Poland) M Matkowski	6	7^{7}
(Argentina) J Acasuso (Argentina) J Mónaco	3	6^{2}
(France) R Gasquet (France) J-W Tsonga	3	6	[10]
(Austria) J Melzer (United States) A Roddick	6	3	[8]
(Argentina) A Calleri (Chile) F González	7^{8}	7^{7}
2	(Canada) D Nestor (Serbia) N Zimonjić	6^{6}	6^{3}

Second round
8	(Australia) P Hanley (India) L Paes	6	4	[10]
(Germany) C Kas (Netherlands) R Wassen	4	6	[7]
(Russia) I Andreev (Belgium) X Malisse	6	2	[5]
4	(India) M Bhupathi (The Bahamas) M Knowles	2	6	[10]
6	(Czech Republic) M Damm (Czech Republic) P Vízner	6	6
(Poland) M Fyrstenberg (Poland) M Matkowski	4	2
(France) R Gasquet (France) J-W Tsonga	6	2	[10]
(Argentina) A Calleri (Chile) F González	4	6	[4]

Quarterfinals
8	(Australia) P Hanley (India) L Paes	2	7^{10}	[6]
4	(India) M Bhupathi (The Bahamas) M Knowles	6	6^{8}	[10]
6	(Czech Republic) M Damm (Czech Republic) P Vízner	4	6	[14]
(France) R Gasquet (France) J-W Tsonga	6	4	[12]

Semifinals
4	(India) M Bhupathi (The Bahamas) M Knowles	7^{7}	4	[11]
6	(Czech Republic) M Damm (Czech Republic) P Vízner	6^{5}	6	[9]
