= 2002 U.S. Men's Clay Court Championships =

- Date: April 22–28
- Edition: 34th
- Category: International Series
- Draw: 32S / 16D
- Prize money: $375,000
- Surface: Clay / outdoor
- Location: Houston, TX, US
- Venue: Westside Tennis Club

Champions

Singles
- (United States) Andy Roddick

Doubles
- (United States) Mardy Fish / (United States) Andy Roddick
← 2001 ·	U.S. Men's Clay Court Championships	· 2003 →

The 2002 U.S. Men's Clay Court Championships was a men's tennis tournament played on outdoor clay courts at the Westside Tennis Club in Houston, Texas in the United States and was part of the International Series of the 2002 ATP Tour. It was the 24th edition of the tournament and ran from April 22 through April 28, 2002. Third-seeded Andy Roddick won his second consecutive singles title at the event.

== Finals ==
=== Singles ===
(United States) Andy Roddick defeated (United States) Pete Sampras 7–6^{(11–9)}, 6–3

- It was Roddick's 3rd title of the year and the 7th of his career.

=== Doubles ===
(United States) Mardy Fish / (United States) Andy Roddick defeated (United States) Jan-Michael Gambill / (United States) Graydon Oliver 6–4, 6–4

- It was Fish's only title of the year and the 1st of his career. It was Roddick's 2nd title of the year and the 6th of his career.
