= 2001 U.S. Men's Clay Court Championships – Doubles =

Doubles
- 2001 U.S. Men's Clay Court Championships

Final
- Champions: (India) Mahesh Bhupathi (India) Leander Paes
- Runners-up: (United States) Kevin Kim (United States) Jim Thomas
- Score: 7–6^{(7–4)}, 6–2

Details
- Draw: 16
- Seeds: 4

Events
Singles	Doubles
- U.S. Men's Clay Court Championships

Leander Paes and Jan Siemerink were the defending champions but they competed with different partners that year, Paes with Mahesh Bhupathi and Siemerink with Jack Waite.

Siemerink and Waite lost in the quarterfinals to George Bastl and Irakli Labadze.

Bhupathi and Paes won in the final 7–6^{(7–4)}, 6–2 against Kevin Kim and Jim Thomas.

== Seeds ==
Champion seeds are indicated in bold text while text in italics indicates the round in which those seeds were eliminated.

1. (United States) Bob Bryan / (United States) Mike Bryan (quarterfinals)
2. (India) **Mahesh Bhupathi** / (India) **Leander Paes (champions)**
3. (Australia) David Macpherson / (South Africa) Grant Stafford (semifinals)
4. (United States) Rick Leach / (United States) Mitch Sprengelmeyer (first round)

== Draw ==
Key

- Q = Qualifier
- WC = Wild card
- LL = Lucky loser
- Alt = Alternate
- ITF = ITF entry
- PR = Protected ranking
- SR = Special ranking
- SE = Special exempt
- JE = Junior exempt
- JR = Junior Accelerator Programme entrant
- CO = College Accelerator Programme entrant
- NG = Next Gen Accelerator Program entrant
- w/o = Walkover
- r = Retired
- d = Defaulted

First round
1	(United States) **B Bryan** (United States) **M Bryan**	6^{7}	**7^{7}**	**6**
(Japan) T Shimada (United States) E Taino	**7^{9}**	6^{5}	3
(United States) **K Kim** (United States) **J Thomas**	**6**	**6**
(Australia) P Kilderry (Australia) P Tramacchi	3	3
4	(United States) R Leach (United States) M Sprengelmeyer	1	1
(Netherlands) **J Siemerink** (United States) **J Waite**	**6**	**6**
Q	(Switzerland) **G Bastl** (Georgia (country)) **I Labadze**	**7**	**6**
WC	(United States) R Ginepri (United States) C Mamiit	5	4
(Brazil) A Prieto (South Africa) P Rosner	5	3
WC	(United States) **J Blake** (United States) **T Blake**	**7**	**6**
(Australia) T Crichton (Australia) A Fisher	3	5
3	(Australia) **D Macpherson** (South Africa) **G Stafford**	**6**	**7**
(United States) J-M Gambill (United States) A Roddick	3	6^{10}
(South Africa) **J Coetzee** (South Africa) **B Haygarth**	**6**	**7^{12}**
WC	(United States) M Fish (United States) A O'Brien	**7**	5	4
2	(India) **M Bhupathi** (India) **L Paes**	5	**7**	**6**

Quarterfinals
1	(United States) B Bryan (United States) M Bryan	5	**6**	3
(United States) **K Kim** (United States) **J Thomas**	**7**	3	**6**
(Netherlands) J Siemerink (United States) J Waite	4	4
Q	(Switzerland) **G Bastl** (Georgia (country)) **I Labadze**	**6**	**6**
WC	(United States) J Blake (United States) T Blake	5	3
3	(Australia) **D Macpherson** (South Africa) **G Stafford**	**7**	**6**
(South Africa) J Coetzee (South Africa) B Haygarth	5	1
2	(India) **M Bhupathi** (India) **L Paes**	**7**	**6**

Semifinals
(United States) **K Kim** (United States) **J Thomas**	**6**	6^{4}	**6**
Q	(Switzerland) G Bastl (Georgia (country)) I Labadze	3	**7^{7}**	3
3	(Australia) D Macpherson (South Africa) G Stafford	6^{3}	**7**	1
2	(India) **M Bhupathi** (India) **L Paes**	**7^{7}**	5	**6**

Final
(United States) K Kim (United States) J Thomas	6^{4}	2
2	(India) **M Bhupathi** (India) **L Paes**	**7^{7}**	**6**
