= 2008 Sony Ericsson Open – Men's singles =

Men's singles
- 2008 Sony Ericsson Open

Final
- Champion: (Russia) Nikolay Davydenko
- Runner-up: (Spain) Rafael Nadal
- Score: 6–4, 6–2

Details
- Draw: 96 (12Q / 1LL / 5WC)
- Seeds: 32

Events
Singles	men	women
Doubles	men	women
← 2007 ·	Miami Open	· 2009 →

Nikolay Davydenko defeated Rafael Nadal in the final, 6–4, 6–2 to win the men's singles tennis title at the 2008 Miami Open. It was his second Masters title.

Novak Djokovic was the defending champion, but lost in the second round to qualifier Kevin Anderson.

== Seeds ==
All seeds received a bye into the second round.

1. (Switzerland) Roger Federer (quarterfinals)
2. (Spain) Rafael Nadal (final)
3. (Serbia) Novak Djokovic (second round)
4. (Russia) Nikolay Davydenko (champion)
5. (Spain) David Ferrer (second round)
6. (United States) Andy Roddick (semifinals)
7. (Argentina) David Nalbandian (second round)
8. (France) Richard Gasquet (second round)
9. (United States) James Blake (quarterfinals)
10. (Czech Republic) Tomáš Berdych (semifinals)
11. (Russia) Mikhail Youzhny (fourth round)
12. (France) Jo-Wilfried Tsonga (third round)
13. (United Kingdom) Andy Murray (second round)
14. (Spain) Tommy Robredo (second round)
15. (Argentina) Guillermo Cañas (fourth round)
16. (France) Paul-Henri Mathieu (fourth round)
17. (Chile) Fernando González (third round)
18. (Argentina) Juan Mónaco (third round)
19. (Croatia) Ivo Karlović (second round)
20. (Spain) Carlos Moyá (third round)
21. (Australia) Lleyton Hewitt (second round)
22. (Spain) Juan Carlos Ferrero (third round)
23. (Croatia) Ivan Ljubičić (second round)
24. (Spain) Nicolás Almagro (third round)
25. (Finland) Jarkko Nieminen (second round)
26. (Germany) Philipp Kohlschreiber (second round)
27. (Czech Republic) Radek Štěpánek (fourth round)
28. (Switzerland) Stanislas Wawrinka (second round)
29. (Spain) Fernando Verdasco (second round)
30. (Argentina) Juan Ignacio Chela (second round)
31. (Russia) Igor Andreev (quarterfinals)
32. (Spain) Feliciano López (third round)

== Draw ==
=== Key ===
- Q = Qualifier
- WC = Wild card
- LL = Lucky loser
- Alt = Alternate
- ITF = ITF entry
- PR = Protected ranking
- SR = Special ranking
- SE = Special exempt
- JE = Junior exempt
- JR = Junior Accelerator Programme entrant
- CO = College Accelerator Programme entrant
- NG = Next Gen Accelerator Program entrant
- w/o = Walkover
- r = Retired
- d = Defaulted

=== Finals ===
Quarterfinals
1	(Switzerland) Roger Federer	6^{4}	6	3
6	(United States) Andy Roddick	7^{7}	4	6
4	(Russia) Nikolay Davydenko	6	6
(Serbia) Janko Tipsarević	2	1
10	(Czech Republic) Tomáš Berdych	6	6
31	(Russia) Igor Andreev	4	4
9	(United States) James Blake	6	3	1
2	(Spain) Rafael Nadal	3	6	6

Semifinals
6	(United States) Andy Roddick	6^{5}	2
4	(Russia) Nikolay Davydenko	7^{7}	6
10	(Czech Republic) Tomáš Berdych	6^{6}	2
2	(Spain) Rafael Nadal	7^{8}	6

Final
4	(Russia) Nikolay Davydenko	6	6
2	(Spain) Rafael Nadal	4	2

=== Top half ===
==== Section 1 ====
First round
(France) G Monfils	6^{8}	6	6
WC	(United States) J Isner	7^{10}	3	3
(Sweden) R Söderling	6	6
(Austria) S Koubek	0	1
(Argentina) J Acasuso	6	6
(Spain) S Ventura	2	4
(South Korea) H-t Lee	4	3
(Israel) D Sela	6	6

Second round
1	(Switzerland) R Federer	6	6
(France) G Monfils	3	4
(Sweden) R Söderling	3	6	6
28	(Switzerland) S Wawrinka	6	4	3
21	(Australia) L Hewitt	3	6^{4}
(Argentina) J Acasuso	6	7^{7}
(Israel) D Sela	7^{7}	6
14	(Spain) T Robredo	6^{5}	1

Third round
1	(Switzerland) R Federer	6	3
(Sweden) R Söderling	4	0^{r}
(Argentina) J Acasuso	6	6
(Israel) D Sela	4	4

Fourth round
1	(Switzerland) R Federer	7^{7}	6
(Argentina) J Acasuso	6^{5}	2

==== Section 2 ====
First round
(Austria) J Melzer	7^{8}	7^{7}
(France) M Llodra	6^{6}	6^{5}
(Germany) R Schüttler	6	1	2
(France) J Benneteau	1	6	6
(Belgium) O Rochus	3	2
Q	(Czech Republic) I Minář	6	6
(Romania) V Hănescu	4	1
Q	(Serbia) V Troicki	6	6

Second round
12	(France) J-W Tsonga	6^{4}	7	6
(Austria) J Melzer	7^{7}	5	1
(France) J Benneteau	3	6	7^{7}
19	(Croatia) I Karlović	6	4	6^{2}
30	(Argentina) JI Chela	3	7	3
Q	(Czech Republic) I Minář	6	5	6
Q	(Serbia) V Troicki	7	2	4
6	(United States) A Roddick	5	6	6

Third round
12	(France) J-W Tsonga	3	3
(France) J Benneteau	6	6
Q	(Czech Republic) I Minář	6^{4}	4
6	(United States) A Roddick	7^{7}	6

Fourth round
(France) J Benneteau	6	3	2
6	(United States) A Roddick	4	6	6

==== Section 3 ====
First round
(Latvia) E Gulbis	6	4	6
(Slovakia) D Hrbatý	3	6	1
Q	(Colombia) S Giraldo	3	5
(Italy) S Bolelli	6	7
Q	(United States) R Sweeting	6	6
(Italy) F Volandri	3	2
WC	(Croatia) M Ančić	6	6^{2}	6
(France) G Simon	2	7^{7}	3

Second round
4	(Russia) N Davydenko	3	7^{8}	7^{7}
(Latvia) E Gulbis	6	6^{6}	6^{3}
(Italy) S Bolelli	6	6
26	(Germany) P Kohlschreiber	4	3
18	(Argentina) J Mónaco	6	7
Q	(United States) R Sweeting	3	5
WC	(Croatia) M Ančić	6	2	7^{9}
13	(United Kingdom) A Murray	2	6	6^{7}

Third round
4	(Russia) N Davydenko	6^{5}	7	6
(Italy) S Bolelli	7^{7}	5	1
18	(Argentina) J Mónaco	6^{5}	6	1
WC	(Croatia) M Ančić	7^{7}	4	6

Fourth round
4	(Russia) N Davydenko	4	6	7
WC	(Croatia) M Ančić	6	3	5

==== Section 4 ====
First round
Q	(United States) B Reynolds	7^{7}	4	7^{7}
(Russia) M Safin	6^{3}	6	6^{5}
(United States) M Fish	3	3
(France) A Clément	6	6
(Serbia) J Tipsarević	6	4	6
Q	(Chinese Taipei) Y-h Lu	1	6	4
Q	(Russia) I Kunitsyn	6	1	2
(Sweden) T Johansson	4	6	6

Second round
11	(Russia) M Youzhny	6	6
Q	(United States) B Reynolds	2	2
(France) A Clément	2	2
24	(Spain) N Almagro	6	6
29	(Spain) F Verdasco	4	6^{4}
(Serbia) J Tipsarević	6	7^{7}
(Sweden) T Johansson	6	7
5	(Spain) D Ferrer	4	5

Third round
11	(Russia) M Youzhny	7^{7}	3	7^{8}
24	(Spain) N Almagro	6^{4}	6	6^{6}
(Serbia) J Tipsarević	6	6
(Sweden) T Johansson	4	4

Fourth round
11	(Russia) M Youzhny	6	0	3
(Serbia) J Tipsarević	3	6	6

=== Bottom half ===
==== Section 5 ====
First round
(Russia) D Tursunov	4	6	6
(Russia) E Korolev	6	3	2
(Argentina) JM del Potro	7	6
WC	(United States) J Levine	5	1
WC	(Japan) K Nishikori	5	2
(Spain) A Montañés	7	6
(Argentina) C Berlocq	6^{4}	3
(United States) S Querrey	7^{7}	6

Second round
8	(France) R Gasquet	3	7^{7}	6^{5}
(Russia) D Tursunov	6	6^{2}	7^{7}
(Argentina) JM del Potro	4	2
32	(Spain) F López	6	6
22	(Spain) JC Ferrero	6	6
(Spain) A Montañés	3	2
(United States) S Querrey	1	2
10	(Czech Republic) T Berdych	6	6

Third round
(Russia) D Tursunov	4	6	6
32	(Spain) F López	6	3	4
22	(Spain) JC Ferrero	1	3
10	(Czech Republic) T Berdych	6	6

Fourth round
(Russia) D Tursunov	2	2
10	(Czech Republic) T Berdych	6	6

==== Section 6 ====
First round
Q	(United States) S Warburg	7^{7}	6
(Italy) P Starace	6^{2}	2
Q	(Uruguay) P Cuevas	6	6
(United States) V Spadea	4	2
(Germany) M Berrer	6	6
Q	(Netherlands) R Haase	4	4
(Argentina) A Calleri	6^{5}	6	6^{4}
Q	(South Africa) K Anderson	7^{7}	3	7^{7}

Second round
15	(Argentina) G Cañas	6	4	7
Q	(United States) S Warburg	3	6	5
Q	(Uruguay) P Cuevas	3	3
17	(Chile) F González	6	6
31	(Russia) I Andreev	6	6
(Germany) M Berrer	2	1
Q	(South Africa) K Anderson	7^{7}	3	6
3	(Serbia) N Djokovic	6^{1}	6	4

Third round
15	(Argentina) G Cañas	7^{8}	7
17	(Chile) F González	6^{6}	5
31	(Russia) I Andreev	6	6^{4}	6
Q	(South Africa) K Anderson	4	7^{7}	4

Fourth round
15	(Argentina) G Cañas	4	6^{6}
31	(Russia) I Andreev	6	7^{8}

==== Section 7 ====
First round
(Spain) Ó Hernández	1	1
(Belgium) X Malisse	6	6
WC	(Brazil) G Kuerten	1	5
(France) S Grosjean	6	7
(France) F Santoro	6	6
(Sweden) J Björkman	1	0
(France) M Gicquel	6	4	2
(Italy) A Seppi	2	6	6

Second round
7	(Argentina) D Nalbandian	1	4
(Belgium) X Malisse	6	6
(France) S Grosjean	3	3
27	(Czech Republic) R Štěpánek	6	6
23	(Croatia) I Ljubičić	6^{4}	6	3
(France) F Santoro	7^{7}	2	6
(Italy) A Seppi	5	3
9	(United States) J Blake	7	6

Third round
(Belgium) X Malisse	3	6^{4}
27	(Czech Republic) R Štěpánek	6	7^{7}
(France) F Santoro	3	7^{7}	4
9	(United States) J Blake	6	6^{4}	6

Fourth round
27	(Czech Republic) R Štěpánek	3	4
9	(United States) J Blake	6	6

==== Section 8 ====
First round
(Croatia) M Čilić	6	6
(Belgium) K Vliegen	3	2
(France) N Mahut	7^{8}	6
(Germany) F Mayer	6^{6}	3
(Germany) N Kiefer	4	7^{11}	6
LL	(Spain) G García López	6	6^{9}	4
(Argentina) S Roitman	3	4
Q	(Germany) B Becker	6	6

Second round
16	(France) P-H Mathieu	4	6	6
(Croatia) M Čilić	6	1	4
(France) N Mahut	6^{10}	4
20	(Spain) C Moyá	7^{12}	6
25	(Finland) J Nieminen	3	2
(Germany) N Kiefer	6	6
Q	(Germany) B Becker	5	2
2	(Spain) R Nadal	7	6

Third round
16	(France) P-H Mathieu	7^{7}	7
20	(Spain) C Moyá	6^{1}	5
(Germany) N Kiefer	2	4
2	(Spain) R Nadal	6	6

Fourth round
16	(France) P-H Mathieu	4	4
2	(Spain) R Nadal	6	6

== Qualifying ==
=== Qualifying seeds ===
1. (Belgium) Steve Darcis (first round)
2. (Spain) Guillermo García López (qualifying competition, lucky loser)
3. (Australia) Chris Guccione (qualifying competition)
4. (Germany) Mischa Zverev (first round)
5. (Netherlands) Robin Haase (qualified)
6. (United States) Donald Young (qualifying competition)
7. (Czech Republic) Ivo Minář (qualified)
8. (Uruguay) Pablo Cuevas (qualified)
9. (Ecuador) Nicolás Lapentti (first round)
10. (Peru) ~~Luis Horna~~ (withdrew due to an illness)
11. (Chile) Nicolás Massú (first round)
12. (Germany) Denis Gremelmayr (qualifying competition)
13. (Argentina) Juan Pablo Brzezicki (first round)
14. (United States) Bobby Reynolds (qualified)
15. (Germany) Benjamin Becker (qualified)
16. (United States) Amer Delić (first round)
17. (Russia) Teymuraz Gabashvili (first round)
18. (Serbia) Viktor Troicki (qualified)
19. (Chinese Taipei) Lu Yen-hsun (qualified)
20. (Chile) Paul Capdeville (qualifying competition)
21. (United States) Robert Kendrick (first round)
22. (Russia) Igor Kunitsyn (qualified)
23. (South Africa) Kevin Anderson (champion)
24. (United States) Wayne Odesnik (qualifying competition)

=== Qualifiers ===
1. (South Africa) Kevin Anderson
2. (Germany) Benjamin Becker
3. (United States) Sam Warburg
4. (Colombia) Santiago Giraldo
5. (Netherlands) Robin Haase
6. (United States) Bobby Reynolds
7. (Czech Republic) Ivo Minář
8. (Uruguay) Pablo Cuevas
9. (Chinese Taipei) Lu Yen-hsun
10. (Serbia) Viktor Troicki
11. (United States) Ryan Sweeting
12. (Russia) Igor Kunitsyn

=== Lucky loser ===
1. (Spain) Guillermo García López

=== Qualifying draws ===
==== First qualifier ====
First round
1	(Belgium) Steve Darcis	1	2
(Israel) Harel Levy	6	6
(United States) Kevin Kim	2	3
23	(South Africa) Kevin Anderson	6	6

Qualifying competition
(Israel) Harel Levy	3	5
23	(South Africa) Kevin Anderson	6	7

==== Second qualifier ====
First round
2	(Spain) Guillermo García López	6	6
(Greece) Konstantinos Economidis	1	1
(Netherlands) Peter Wessels	6	3	5
15	(Germany) Benjamin Becker	4	6	7

Qualifying competition
2	(Spain) Guillermo García López	4	2
15	(Germany) Benjamin Becker	6	6

==== Third qualifier ====
First round
3	(Australia) Chris Guccione	7^{7}	6
WC	(Portugal) Gastão Elias	6^{3}	1
(United States) Sam Warburg	7^{7}	6
13	(Argentina) Juan Pablo Brzezicki	6^{1}	3

Qualifying competition
3	(Australia) Chris Guccione	6^{4}	2
(United States) Sam Warburg	7^{7}	6

==== Fourth qualifier ====
First round
4	(Germany) Mischa Zverev	5	3
(Colombia) Santiago Giraldo	7	6
(Slovakia) Lukáš Lacko	3	1
24	(United States) Wayne Odesnik	6	6

Qualifying competition
(Colombia) Santiago Giraldo	6	7
24	(United States) Wayne Odesnik	4	5

==== Fifth qualifier ====
First round
5	(Netherlands) Robin Haase	6	6
(South Africa) Rik de Voest	4	0
(Serbia) Dušan Vemić	6^{6}	6	6
16	(United States) Amer Delić	7^{8}	3	4

Qualifying competition
5	(Netherlands) Robin Haase	6	6
(Serbia) Dušan Vemić	4	3

==== Sixth qualifier ====
First round
6	(United States) Donald Young	6	0
(South Africa) Wesley Moodie	1	0^{r}
WC	(Canada) Philip Bester	3	1
14	(United States) Bobby Reynolds	6	6

Qualifying competition
6	(United States) Donald Young	3	5
14	(United States) Bobby Reynolds	6	7

==== Seventh qualifier ====
First round
7	(Czech Republic) Ivo Minář	6	6
WC	(Lithuania) Ričardas Berankis	2	4
WC	(United States) Ryan Harrison	4	5
20	(Chile) Paul Capdeville	6	7

Qualifying competition
7	(Czech Republic) Ivo Minář	6	6
20	(Chile) Paul Capdeville	3	4

==== Eighth qualifier ====
First round
8	(Uruguay) Pablo Cuevas	6	7^{7}
Alt	(Netherlands) Jesse Huta Galung	4	6^{4}
(Australia) Alun Jones	7	3	6
17	(Russia) Teymuraz Gabashvili	5	6	2

Qualifying competition
8	(Uruguay) Pablo Cuevas	6	6
(Australia) Alun Jones	4	4

==== Ninth qualifier ====
First round
9	(Ecuador) Nicolás Lapentti	5	7	4
(Czech Republic) Lukáš Dlouhý	7	5	6
(Luxembourg) Gilles Müller	3	4
19	(Chinese Taipei) Lu Yen-hsun	6	6

Qualifying competition
(Czech Republic) Lukáš Dlouhý	7^{7}	6^{3}	3
19	(Chinese Taipei) Lu Yen-hsun	6^{2}	7^{7}	6

==== Tenth qualifier ====
First round
Alt	(Belarus) Max Mirnyi	4	2
(Switzerland) Stéphane Bohli	6	6
(United Kingdom) Alex Bogdanovic	4	6	1
18	(Serbia) Viktor Troicki	6	3	6

Qualifying competition
(Switzerland) Stéphane Bohli	6	6^{3}	4
18	(Serbia) Viktor Troicki	3	7^{7}	6

==== Eleventh qualifier ====
First round
11	(Chile) Nicolás Massú	6	1	4
(Argentina) Diego Hartfield	3	6	6
WC	(United States) Ryan Sweeting	6	3	6
21	(United States) Robert Kendrick	4	6	4

Qualifying competition
(Argentina) Diego Hartfield	6	3	0
WC	(United States) Ryan Sweeting	3	6	6

==== Twelfth qualifier ====
First round
12	(Germany) Denis Gremelmayr	6	6
(Chinese Taipei) Wang Yeu-tzuoo	1	3
(Germany) Philipp Petzschner	4	1
22	(Russia) Igor Kunitsyn	6	6

Qualifying competition
12	(Germany) Denis Gremelmayr	1	2
22	(Russia) Igor Kunitsyn	6	6
