= 2001 U.S. Men's Clay Court Championships =

- Date: April 30 – May 6
- Edition: 33rd
- Category: International Series
- Draw: 32S / 16D
- Prize money: $325,000
- Surface: Clay / outdoor
- Location: Houston, TX, US
- Venue: Westside Tennis Club

Champions

Singles
- (United States) Andy Roddick

Doubles
- (India) Mahesh Bhupathi / (India) Leander Paes
| ← 2000 · | U.S. Men's Clay Court Championships | · 2002 → |

The 2001 U.S. Men's Clay Court Championships was a men's tennis tournament played on outdoor clay courts at the Westside Tennis Club in Houston, Texas in the United States and was part of the International Series of the 2001 ATP Tour. It was the 33rd edition of the tournament and ran from April 30 through May 6, 2001. Unseeded Andy Roddick, who entered the main draw on a wildcard, won the singles title.

== Finals ==
=== Singles ===
(United States) Andy Roddick defeated (South Korea) Hyung-Taik Lee 7–5, 6–3

- It was Roddick's 2nd singles title of the year and of his career.

=== Doubles ===
(India) Mahesh Bhupathi / (India) Leander Paes defeated (United States) Kevin Kim / (United States) Jim Thomas 7–6^{(7–4)}, 6–2

- It was Bhupathi's 2nd title of the year and the 19th of his career. It was Paes's 2nd title of the year and the 22nd of his career.
