= 2002 U.S. Men's Clay Court Championships – Singles =

Singles
- 2002 U.S. Men's Clay Court Championships

Final
- Champion: (United States) Andy Roddick
- Runner-up: (United States) Pete Sampras
- Score: 7–6^{(11–9)}, 6–3

Details
- Draw: 32
- Seeds: 8

Events
Singles	Doubles
- U.S. Men's Clay Court Championships

The 2002 U.S. Men's Clay Court Championships – Singles was an event of the 2002 U.S. Men's Clay Court Championships professional tennis tournament played on outdoor clay courts at the Westside Tennis Club in Houston, Texas in the United States and was part of the International Series of the 2002 ATP Tour. The tournament was held from April 22 through April 28, 2006. The singles draw comprised 32 players and eight of them were seeded. Third-seeded Andy Roddick was the defending champion and won in the final 7–6^{(11–9)}, 6–3 against fourth-seeded Pete Sampras.

== Seeds ==
A champion seed is indicated in bold text while text in italics indicates the round in which that seed was eliminated.

1. (Germany) Tommy Haas (second round)
2. (United States) Andre Agassi (semifinals)
3. (United States) **Andy Roddick (champion)**
4. (United States) Pete Sampras (final)
5. (United States) James Blake (quarterfinals)
6. (South Africa) Wayne Ferreira (first round)
7. (United States) Todd Martin (quarterfinals)
8. (United States) Jan-Michael Gambill (first round)

== Draw ==
Key

- Q = Qualifier
- WC = Wild card
- LL = Lucky loser
- Alt = Alternate
- ITF = ITF entry
- PR = Protected ranking
- SR = Special ranking
- SE = Special exempt
- JE = Junior exempt
- JR = Junior Accelerator Programme entrant
- CO = College Accelerator Programme entrant
- NG = Next Gen Accelerator Program entrant
- w/o = Walkover
- r = Retired
- d = Defaulted

First round
1	(Germany) **T Haas**	**6**	**6**
WC	(United States) A Kim	2	4
(United States) T Dent	4	2
(Australia) **W Arthurs**	**6**	**6**
Q	(Ecuador) L Morejón	0	3
(Argentina) **G Coria**	**6**	**6**
(Brazil) **F Saretta**	**6**	**7**
6	(South Africa) W Ferreira	4	5
3	(United States) **A Roddick**	**6**	**6**
(United States) M Russell	1	2
Q	(United States) K Capalik	2	**6**	3
(Spain) **Á Calatrava**	**6**	3	**6**
(United States) **M Chang**	**6**	**6**
(Austria) J Knowle	1	2
(Paraguay) R Delgado	2	1
5	(United States) **J Blake**	**6**	**6**
7	(United States) **T Martin**	**6**	**6**
Q	(Argentina) I Hirigoyen	0	4
(Germany) L Burgsmüller	1	2
(Russia) **N Davydenko**	**6**	**6**
(United Kingdom) M Lee	1	2
Q	(Argentina) **M Puerta**	**6**	**6**
(Czech Republic) J Vacek	**6**	1	5
WC/4	(United States) **P Sampras**	4	**6**	**7**
8	(United States) J-M Gambill	**6**	2	5
(Denmark) **K Pless**	2	**6**	**7**
(Australia) A Ilie	1	4
(Israel) **N Okun**	**6**	**6**
WC	(United States) B Bryan	2	3
(South Korea) **H-T Lee**	**6**	**6**
(Russia) M Youzhny	4	**6**	4
2	(United States) **A Agassi**	**6**	3	**6**

Second round
1	(Germany) T Haas	**6**	3	6^{4}
(Australia) **W Arthurs**	3	**6**	**7^{7}**
(Argentina) **G Coria**	3	**7^{7}**	**6**
(Brazil) F Saretta	**6**	6^{3}	0
3	(United States) **A Roddick**	**6**	**6**
(Spain) Á Calatrava	2	1
(United States) M Chang	1	4
5	(United States) **J Blake**	**6**	**6**
7	(United States) **T Martin**	**7^{7}**	**6**
(Russia) N Davydenko	6^{4}	3
Q	(Argentina) M Puerta	4	2
WC/4	(United States) **P Sampras**	**6**	**6**
(Denmark) **K Pless**	**7^{7}**	4	**7**
(Israel) N Okun	6^{5}	**6**	5
(South Korea) H-T Lee	4	5
2	(United States) **A Agassi**	**6**	**7**

Quarterfinals
(Australia) W Arthurs	6^{6}	5
(Argentina) **G Coria**	**7^{8}**	**7**
3	(United States) **A Roddick**	**6**	**6**
5	(United States) J Blake	2	4
7	(United States) T Martin	2	6^{3}
WC/4	(United States) **P Sampras**	**6**	**7^{7}**
(Denmark) K Pless	3	3
2	(United States) **A Agassi**	**6**	**6**

Semifinals
(Argentina) G Coria	3	**6**	2
3	(United States) **A Roddick**	**6**	2	**6**
WC/4	(United States) **P Sampras**	**6**	**7**
2	(United States) A Agassi	1	5

Final
3	(United States) **Andy Roddick**	**7^{11}**	**6**
WC/4	(United States) Pete Sampras	6^{9}	3
