= 2002 U.S. Men's Clay Court Championships – Doubles =

Doubles
- 2002 U.S. Men's Clay Court Championships

Final
- Champions: (United States) Mardy Fish (United States) Andy Roddick
- Runners-up: (United States) Jan-Michael Gambill (United States) Graydon Oliver
- Score: 6–4, 6–4

Details
- Draw: 16
- Seeds: 4

Events
Singles	Doubles
- U.S. Men's Clay Court Championships

Mahesh Bhupathi and Leander Paes were the defending champions but only Paes competed that year with John-Laffnie de Jager.

de Jager and Paes lost in the first round to Robert Kendrick and Brian Vahaly.

Mardy Fish and Andy Roddick won in the final 6–4, 6–4 against Jan-Michael Gambill and Graydon Oliver.

== Seeds ==
Champion seeds are indicated in bold text while text in italics indicates the round in which those seeds were eliminated.

1. (United States) Bob Bryan / (United States) Mike Bryan (quarterfinals)
2. (South Africa) John-Laffnie de Jager / (India) Leander Paes (first round)
3. (United States) Rick Leach / (Australia) David Macpherson (first round)
4. (Australia) Wayne Arthurs / (Australia) Paul Hanley (first round)

== Draw ==
Key

- Q = Qualifier
- WC = Wild card
- LL = Lucky loser
- Alt = Alternate
- ITF = ITF entry
- PR = Protected ranking
- SR = Special ranking
- SE = Special exempt
- JE = Junior exempt
- JR = Junior Accelerator Programme entrant
- CO = College Accelerator Programme entrant
- NG = Next Gen Accelerator Program entrant
- w/o = Walkover
- r = Retired
- d = Defaulted

First round
1	(United States) **B Bryan** (United States) **M Bryan**	**6**	3	**[10]**
(Austria) J Knowle (Germany) M Kohlmann	3	**6**	[4]
(Argentina) **M García** (Argentina) **L Lobo**	**7^{7}**	**6**
(Paraguay) R Delgado (Brazil) F Saretta	6^{1}	3
3	(United States) R Leach (Australia) D Macpherson	6^{3}	**6**	[10]
(South Africa) **W Ferreira** (South Africa) **N Godwin**	**7^{7}**	3	**[12]**
(Australia) B Ellwood (Australia) S Huss	3	3
WC	(United States) **J-M Gambill** (United States) **G Oliver**	**6**	**6**
(United States) **M Fish** (United States) **A Roddick**	4	**6**	**[12]**
(United States) S Humphries (United States) G Weiner	**6**	3	[10]
WC	(United States) **J Blake** (United States) **T Blake**	**7^{7}**	5	**[10]**
4	(Australia) W Arthurs (Australia) P Hanley	6^{5}	**7**	[5]
(South Africa) J Coetzee (South Africa) M Wakefield	3	**6**	[9]
(United States) **D Bowen** (Australia) **A Fisher**	**6**	3	**[11]**
WC	(United States) **R Kendrick** (United States) **B Vahaly**	**6**	**6**
2	(South Africa) J-L de Jager (India) L Paes	3	2

Quarterfinals
1	(United States) B Bryan (United States) M Bryan	**7^{8}**	3	[12]
(Argentina) **M García** (Argentina) **L Lobo**	6^{6}	**6**	**[14]**
(South Africa) W Ferreira (South Africa) N Godwin	4	**7^{7}**	[6]
WC	(United States) **J-M Gambill** (United States) **G Oliver**	**6**	6^{4}	**[10]**
(United States) **M Fish** (United States) **A Roddick**	**6**	**6**
WC	(United States) J Blake (United States) T Blake	4	4
(United States) **D Bowen** (Australia) **A Fisher**	**6**	5	**[13]**
WC	(United States) R Kendrick (United States) B Vahaly	4	**7**	[11]

Semifinals
(Argentina) M García (Argentina) L Lobo	3	4
WC	(United States) **J-M Gambill** (United States) **G Oliver**	**6**	**6**
(United States) **M Fish** (United States) **A Roddick**	6^{3}	**6**	**[10]**
(United States) D Bowen (Australia) A Fisher	**7^{7}**	3	[6]

Final
WC	(United States) J-M Gambill (United States) G Oliver	4	4
(United States) **M Fish** (United States) **A Roddick**	**6**	**6**
