= 2001 U.S. Men's Clay Court Championships – Singles =

Singles
- 2001 U.S. Men's Clay Court Championships

Final
- Champion: (United States) Andy Roddick
- Runner-up: (South Korea) Hyung-Taik Lee
- Score: 7–5, 6–3

Details
- Draw: 32
- Seeds: 8

Events
Singles	Doubles
- U.S. Men's Clay Court Championships

Fernando González was the defending champion but lost in the first round to Michal Tabara.

Andy Roddick won in the final 7–5, 6–3 against Hyung-Taik Lee.

== Seeds ==
A champion seed is indicated in bold text while text in italics indicates the round in which that seed was eliminated.

1. (United States) Jan-Michael Gambill (first round)
2. (Australia) Andrew Ilie (quarterfinals)
3. (France) Jérôme Golmard (semifinals)
4. (Czech Republic) Michal Tabara (semifinals)
5. (Sweden) Magnus Gustafsson (second round)
6. (Belgium) Olivier Rochus (quarterfinals)
7. (Belgium) Xavier Malisse (second round)
8. (South Korea) Hyung-Taik Lee (final)

== Draw ==
Key

- Q = Qualifier
- WC = Wild card
- LL = Lucky loser
- Alt = Alternate
- ITF = ITF entry
- PR = Protected ranking
- SR = Special ranking
- SE = Special exempt
- JE = Junior exempt
- JR = Junior Accelerator Programme entrant
- CO = College Accelerator Programme entrant
- NG = Next Gen Accelerator Program entrant
- w/o = Walkover
- r = Retired
- d = Defaulted

First round
1	(United States) J-M Gambill	5	**6**	2
Q	(Norway) **C Ruud**	**7**	3	**6**
(Austria) **S Koubek**	6^{4}	**6**	**6**
(Netherlands) E Kempes	**7^{7}**	3	3
(Netherlands) R Sluiter	3	4
WC	(United States) **A Roddick**	**6**	**6**
(Brazil) F Meligeni	0	2
5	(Sweden) **M Gustafsson**	**6**	**6**
3	(France) **J Golmard**	4	**6**	**7**
(Morocco) K Alami	**6**	4	5
(Switzerland) G Bastl	4	4
(Spain) **D Sánchez**	**6**	**6**
WC	(United States) M Russell	5	0
(Czech Republic) **J Vaněk**	**7**	**6**
Q	(Georgia (country)) I Labadze	**6**	3	4
7	(Belgium) **X Malisse**	2	**6**	**6**
6	(Belgium) **O Rochus**	**6**	**6**
Q	(United States) R Ginepri	4	4
WC	(United States) M Fish	4	4
(Italy) **A Gaudenzi**	**6**	**6**
(Belgium) C Rochus	2	4
Q	(United States) **J Blake**	**6**	**6**
(Chile) F González	5	4
4	(Czech Republic) **M Tabara**	**7**	**6**
8	(South Korea) **H-T Lee**	**6**	**6**
(Russia) A Stoliarov	4	1
(Sweden) **M Larsson**	5	**6**	**7^{13}**
(Netherlands) J Siemerink	**7**	1	6^{11}
(United States) C Woodruff	5	3
(Germany) **A Popp**	**7**	**6**
(Germany) L Burgsmüller	3	5
2	(Australia) **A Ilie**	**6**	**7**

Second round
Q	(Norway) C Ruud	**6**	2	5
(Austria) **S Koubek**	4	**6**	**7**
WC	(United States) **A Roddick**	**6**	**6**
5	(Sweden) M Gustafsson	2	4
3	(France) **J Golmard**	**7^{7}**	**6**
(Spain) D Sánchez	6^{3}	4
(Czech Republic) **J Vaněk**	**7^{7}**	**7^{7}**
7	(Belgium) X Malisse	6^{4}	6^{5}
6	(Belgium) **O Rochus**	**6**	**7^{9}**
(Italy) A Gaudenzi	2	6^{7}
Q	(United States) J Blake	**6**	3	4
4	(Czech Republic) **M Tabara**	3	**6**	**6**
8	(South Korea) **H-T Lee**	**6**	4	**7**
(Sweden) M Larsson	0	**6**	5
(Germany) A Popp	**6**	2	6^{5}
2	(Australia) **A Ilie**	4	**6**	**7^{7}**

Quarterfinals
(Austria) S Koubek	3	1
WC	(United States) **A Roddick**	**6**	**6**
3	(France) **J Golmard**	**6**	**6**
(Czech Republic) J Vaněk	3	2
6	(Belgium) O Rochus	4	2
4	(Czech Republic) **M Tabara**	**6**	**6**
8	(South Korea) **H-T Lee**	**6**	2	**6**
2	(Australia) A Ilie	4	**6**	2

Semifinals
WC	(United States) **A Roddick**	**7^{7}**	**7^{7}**
3	(France) J Golmard	6^{3}	6^{2}
4	(Czech Republic) M Tabara	**6**	2	1
8	(South Korea) **H-T Lee**	4	**6**	**6**

Final
WC	(United States) **Andy Roddick**	**7**	**6**
8	(South Korea) Hyung-Taik Lee	5	3
