= 2007 Sony Ericsson Open =

- Date: March 21 – April 1
- Edition: 23rd
- Category: ATP Masters Series (men); Tier I Series (women)
- Surface: Hard / outdoor
- Location: Key Biscayne, Florida, U.S.
- Venue: Tennis Center at Crandon Park

Champions

Men's singles
- (Serbia) Novak Djokovic

Women's singles
- (United States) Serena Williams

Men's doubles
- (United States) Bob Bryan / (United States) Mike Bryan

Women's doubles
- (United States) Lisa Raymond / (Australia) Samantha Stosur

Boys' singles
- (Japan) Kei Nishikori

Girls' singles
- (Romania) Sorana Cîrstea
← 2006 ·	Miami Open	· 2008 →

The 2007 Sony Ericsson Open was the 23rd edition of this tennis tournament and was played on outdoor hardcourts. The tournament was part of the ATP Masters Series of the 2007 ATP Tour and was classified as a Tier I event on the 2007 WTA Tour. The tournament took place at the Tennis Center at Crandon Park in Key Biscayne, Florida, from March 21 through April 1, 2007.

== Summary of tournament ==
Novak Djokovic and Serena Williams were the singles champions. Djokovic won his first Masters Series event of his career; whilst the resurgent Williams beat Henin for the only time in 2007.

Guillermo Cañas' ascent also continued, defeating Roger Federer for the second time in 6 days, and in two consecutive tournaments, making him the only man apart from Rafael Nadal to achieve this feat since 2003. Fellow Argentine David Nalbandian also completed a double over Federer later in the year, beating him at the Madrid and Paris Masters.

The event also featured boys and girls junior singles tournaments, which were won by Kei Nishikori and Sorana Cîrstea respectively.

From 2007 and onwards, for both men's and women's doubles, instead of a normal third set, it is replaced with a third set match tie breaker, where the first team to ten wins the match. Should it be 9–9, the first team to lead by two wins the match.

== Finals ==
=== Men's singles ===
(Serbia) Novak Djokovic defeated (Argentina) Guillermo Cañas 6–3, 6–2, 6–4

=== Women's singles ===
(United States) Serena Williams defeated (Belgium) Justine Henin 0–6, 7–5, 6–3

=== Men's doubles ===
(United States) Bob Bryan / (United States) Mike Bryan defeated (Czech Republic) Martin Damm / (India) Leander Paes 6–7^{(7–9)}, 6–3, [10–7]

=== Women's doubles ===
(United States) Lisa Raymond / (Australia) Samantha Stosur defeated (Zimbabwe) Cara Black / (United States) Liezel Huber 6–4, 3–6, [10–2]

=== Boys' singles ===
(Japan) Kei Nishikori defeated (United States) Michael McClune 6–7^{(2–7)}, 6–4, 6–1

=== Girls' singles ===
(Romania) Sorana Cîrstea defeated (Russia) Anastasia Pivovarova 6–2, 6–1
