= 2008 Sony Ericsson Open – Women's singles =

Women's singles
- 2008 Sony Ericsson Open

Final
- Champion: (United States) Serena Williams
- Runner-up: (Serbia) Jelena Janković
- Score: 6–1, 5–7, 6–3

Details
- Draw: 96 (8WC/12Q/2LL)
- Seeds: 32

Events
Singles	men	women
Doubles	men	women
← 2007 ·	Miami Open	· 2009 →

Defending champion Serena Williams defeated Jelena Janković in the final, 6–1, 5–7, 6–3 to win the women's singles tennis title at the 2008 Miami Open. It was her fifth Miami Open title, tying Steffi Graf's record.

== Seeds ==
All seeds received a bye into the second round.

1. (Belgium) Justine Henin (quarterfinals)
2. (Serbia) Ana Ivanovic (third round)
3. (Russia) Svetlana Kuznetsova (semifinals)
4. (Serbia) Jelena Janković (final)
5. (Russia) Anna Chakvetadze (third round)
6. (United States) Venus Williams (quarterfinals)
7. (Slovakia) Daniela Hantuchová (third round)
8. (United States) Serena Williams (champion)
9. (France) Marion Bartoli (second round)
10. (Russia) Elena Dementieva (quarterfinals, retired due to a mid-back injury)
11. (Switzerland) Patty Schnyder (third round)
12. (Czech Republic) Nicole Vaidišová (second round)
13. (Russia) Dinara Safina (quarterfinals)
14. (Russia) Nadia Petrova (second round, retired due to a right quad strain)
15. (Hungary) Ágnes Szávay (second round)
16. (Israel) Shahar Pe'er (fourth round)
17. (Poland) Agnieszka Radwańska (second round)
18. (Austria) Sybille Bammer (third round)
19. (Russia) Vera Zvonareva (semifinals)
20. (Italy) Francesca Schiavone (second round)
21. (Ukraine) Alona Bondarenko (second round)
22. (Slovenia) Katarina Srebotnik (third round)
23. (France) Virginie Razzano (second round)
24. (France) Amélie Mauresmo (third round)
25. (Belarus) Victoria Azarenka (third round)
26. (Russia) Maria Kirilenko (second round)
27. (Italy) Flavia Pennetta (third round)
28. (Spain) Anabel Medina Garrigues (second round)
29. (India) Sania Mirza (withdrew due to a right wrist injury)
30. (Netherlands) Michaëlla Krajicek (second round)
31. (Italy) Karin Knapp (second round)
32. (United States) Lindsay Davenport (fourth round)

== Draw ==
=== Key ===
- Q = Qualifier
- WC = Wild card
- LL = Lucky loser
- Alt = Alternate
- ITF = ITF entry
- PR = Protected ranking
- SR = Special ranking
- SE = Special exempt
- JE = Junior exempt
- JR = Junior Accelerator Programme entrant
- CO = College Accelerator Programme entrant
- NG = Next Gen Accelerator Program entrant
- w/o = Walkover
- r = Retired
- d = Defaulted

=== Finals ===
Quarterfinals
1	(Belgium) Justine Henin	2	0
8	(United States) Serena Williams	6	6
3	(Russia) Svetlana Kuznetsova	6	6
6	(United States) Venus Williams	4	4
10	(Russia) Elena Dementieva	1	1^{r}
4	(Serbia) Jelena Janković	6	3
19	(Russia) Vera Zvonareva	7	6
13	(Russia) Dinara Safina	5	4

Semifinals
8	(United States) Serena Williams	3	7	6
3	(Russia) Svetlana Kuznetsova	6	5	3
4	(Serbia) Jelena Janković	6	6
19	(Russia) Vera Zvonareva	1	4

Final
8	(United States) Serena Williams	6	5	6
4	(Serbia) Jelena Janković	1	7	3

=== Top half ===
==== Section 1 ====
First round
(Germany) A Kerber	7	6
(Uzbekistan) A Amanmuradova	5	1
(Japan) A Morigami	2	6	4
(Italy) S Errani	6	3	6
Q	(Switzerland) E Gagliardi	4	3
(United States) A Harkleroad	6	6
(Russia) E Vesnina	6	6
(Russia) E Likhovtseva	4	4

Second round
1	(Belgium) J Henin	6	6
(Germany) A Kerber	4	2
(Italy) S Errani	6	4	7
26	(Russia) M Kirilenko	4	6	6^{2}
23	(France) V Razzano	4	4
(United States) A Harkleroad	6	6
(Russia) E Vesnina	6	4	6
15	(Hungary) Á Szávay	2	6	1

Third round
1	(Belgium) J Henin	6	6
(Italy) S Errani	2	1
(United States) A Harkleroad	4	7	4
(Russia) E Vesnina	6	5	6

Fourth round
1	(Belgium) J Henin	6	6
(Russia) E Vesnina	2	2

==== Section 2 ====
First round
(United States) M Shaughnessy	6	4	1
Q	(United States) V King	3	6	6
Q	(Czech Republic) P Kvitová	6	5	5
(Estonia) K Kanepi	3	7	7
(Australia) C Dellacqua	2	6^{1}
Q	(Russia) A Rodionova	6	7
(Czech Republic) K Zakopalová	4	1
(Romania) E Gallovits	6	6

Second round
11	(Switzerland) P Schnyder	7	4	6
Q	(United States) V King	6^{8}	6	2
(Estonia) K Kanepi	7	1	6
21	(Ukraine) A Bondarenko	6^{7}	6	3
27	(Italy) F Pennetta	6	6
Q	(Russia) A Rodionova	4	2
(Romania) E Gallovits	1	2
8	(United States) S Williams	6	6

Third round
11	(Switzerland) P Schnyder	0	1
(Estonia) K Kanepi	6	6
27	(Italy) F Pennetta	7	3	2
8	(United States) S Williams	6^{6}	6	6

Fourth round
(Estonia) K Kanepi	3	3
8	(United States) S Williams	6	6

==== Section 3 ====
First round
(Chinese Taipei) Y-j Chan	6	2	6
(Romania) IR Olaru	1	6	1
(Ukraine) T Perebiynis	6	7
(Argentina) G Dulko	4	6^{1}
(Russia) E Makarova	6	6^{3}	3
WC	(Portugal) M Larcher de Brito	3	7	6
Q	(Japan) A Nakamura	0	0
(France) N Dechy	6	6

Second round
3	(Russia) S Kuznetsova	6	3	6
(Chinese Taipei) Y-j Chan	1	6	0
(Ukraine) T Perebiynis	2	4
25	(Belarus) V Azarenka	6	6
17	(Poland) A Radwańska	6	3	5
WC	(Portugal) M Larcher de Brito	2	6	7
(France) N Dechy	6^{6}	3
16	(Israel) S Pe'er	7	6

Third round
3	(Russia) S Kuznetsova	1	7	6
25	(Belarus) V Azarenka	6	5	0
WC	(Portugal) M Larcher de Brito	0	2
16	(Israel) S Pe'er	6	6

Fourth round
3	(Russia) S Kuznetsova	7	6
16	(Israel) S Pe'er	6^{4}	3

==== Section 4 ====
First round
(Bulgaria) T Pironkova	4	5
(Denmark) C Wozniacki	6	7
Q	(Paraguay) R de los Ríos	6	4	6
(Austria) Y Meusburger	2	6	4
(Germany) M Müller	4	7	2
WC	(New Zealand) M Erakovic	6	6^{4}	6
(United States) J Craybas	4	6	6^{6}
(Poland) M Domachowska	6	0	7

Second round
9	(France) M Bartoli	3	1
(Denmark) C Wozniacki	6	6
Q	(Paraguay) R de los Ríos	2	2
22	(Slovenia) K Srebotnik	6	6
30	(Netherlands) M Krajicek	2	6	2
WC	(New Zealand) M Erakovic	6	3	6
(Poland) M Domachowska	4	3
6	(United States) V Williams	6	6

Third round
(Denmark) C Wozniacki	2	6	6
22	(Slovenia) K Srebotnik	6	3	1
WC	(New Zealand) M Erakovic	2	1
6	(United States) V Williams	6	6

Fourth round
(Denmark) C Wozniacki	3	3
6	(United States) V Williams	6	6

=== Bottom half ===
==== Section 5 ====
First round
(France) A Cornet	1	6	3
(Austria) T Paszek	6	2	6
WC	(United States) C Vandeweghe	4	5
WC	(Germany) S Lisicki	6	7
LL	(Thailand) T Tanasugarn	1	2
(Slovakia) D Cibulková	6	6
(Ukraine) K Bondarenko	6	6
(France) P Parmentier	1	3

Second round
5	(Russia) A Chakvetadze	6	6
(Austria) T Paszek	3	2
WC	(Germany) S Lisicki	6	7
LL	(Ukraine) M Koryttseva	1	5
20	(Italy) F Schiavone	6	4	4
(Slovakia) D Cibulková	3	6	6
(Ukraine) K Bondarenko	0	4
10	(Russia) E Dementieva	6	6

Third round
5	(Russia) A Chakvetadze	5	1
WC	(Germany) S Lisicki	7	6
(Slovakia) D Cibulková	0	7	4
10	(Russia) E Dementieva	6	6^{1}	6

Fourth round
WC	(Germany) S Lisicki	3	2
10	(Russia) E Dementieva	6	6

==== Section 6 ====
First round
PR	(China) J Zheng	6	7
Q	(Russia) G Voskoboeva	2	6^{3}
(China) S Peng	1
(Greece) E Daniilidou	1	r
(Czech Republic) L Šafářová	6	7
WC	(Romania) S Cîrstea	1	5
(Sweden) S Arvidsson	6	6
Q	(Belarus) T Poutchek	4	3

Second round
14	(Russia) N Petrova	1	r
PR	(China) J Zheng	2
(China) S Peng	6	2	6^{2}
24	(France) A Mauresmo	4	6	7
31	(Italy) K Knapp	6	5	0
(Czech Republic) L Šafářová	3	7	6
(Sweden) S Arvidsson	7	2	6^{9}
4	(Serbia) J Janković	6^{7}	6	7

Third round
PR	(China) J Zheng	5	6	6
24	(France) A Mauresmo	7	4	4
(Czech Republic) L Šafářová	2	1
4	(Serbia) J Janković	6	6

Fourth round
PR	(China) J Zheng	4	5
4	(Serbia) J Janković	6	7

==== Section 7 ====
First round
(Venezuela) M Sequera	6	6
(Russia) Y Shvedova	3	4
WC	(Russia) A Pivovarova	3	6^{2}
(Japan) A Sugiyama	6	7
WC	(Canada) S Dubois	3	3
Q	(Russia) E Bychkova	6	6
(Belarus) O Govortsova	3	7	2
Q	(Russia) A Kleybanova	6	6^{6}	6

Second round
7	(Slovakia) D Hantuchová	6	6
(Venezuela) M Sequera	2	1
(Japan) A Sugiyama	6	6
28	(Spain) A Medina Garrigues	2	3
19	(Russia) V Zvonareva	3	6	6
Q	(Russia) E Bychkova	6	3	2
Q	(Russia) A Kleybanova	6	6
12	(Czech Republic) N Vaidišová	4	0

Third round
7	(Slovakia) D Hantuchová	4	7	5
(Japan) A Sugiyama	6	6^{8}	7
19	(Russia) V Zvonareva	6	6
Q	(Russia) A Kleybanova	1	4

Fourth round
(Japan) A Sugiyama	2	7	0
19	(Russia) V Zvonareva	6	6^{5}	6

==== Section 8 ====
First round
Q	(Canada) A Wozniak	2	6	6
(France) A Rezaï	6	4	3
WC	(United States) M Oudin	5	6	1
(Italy) T Garbin	7	2	6
Q	(Ukraine) O Savchuk	1	5
(France) C Pin	6	7
(France) É Loit	7	6
(Spain) V Ruano Pascual	6^{1}	4

Second round
13	(Russia) D Safina	6	6
Q	(Canada) A Wozniak	2	2
(Italy) T Garbin	2	2
18	(Austria) S Bammer	6	6
32	(United States) L Davenport	6	6
(France) C Pin	2	1
(France) É Loit	1	2
2	(Serbia) A Ivanovic	6	6

Third round
13	(Russia) D Safina	4	6	6
18	(Austria) S Bammer	6	1	0
32	(United States) L Davenport	6	6
2	(Serbia) A Ivanovic	4	2

Fourth round
13	(Russia) D Safina	6	6
32	(United States) L Davenport	3	4

== Qualifying ==
=== Qualifying seeds ===
1. (Switzerland) Timea Bacsinszky (first round)
2. (Ukraine) Mariya Koryttseva (qualifying competition, Lucky loser)
3. (Argentina) María Emilia Salerni (first round)
4. (Russia) Anastasia Rodionova (qualified)
5. (Thailand) Tamarine Tanasugarn (qualifying competition, Lucky loser)
6. (Russia) Alisa Kleybanova (qualified)
7. (China) Yuan Meng (qualifying competition)
8. (Japan) Aiko Nakamura (qualified)
9. (United States) Julie Ditty (first round)
10. (Czech Republic) Petra Cetkovská (qualifying competition)
11. (United States) Lilia Osterloh (qualifying competition)
12. (Ukraine) Olga Savchuk (qualified)
13. (Chinese Taipei) Hsieh Su-wei (first round)
14. (Russia) Alla Kudryavtseva (qualifying competition)
15. (Colombia) Catalina Castaño (first round)
16. (Russia) Ekaterina Bychkova (qualified)
17. (Luxembourg) Anne Kremer (qualifying competition)
18. (Russia) Olga Puchkova (first round)
19. (Ukraine) Yuliana Fedak (first round)
20. (Russia) Galina Voskoboeva (qualified)
21. (Italy) Maria Elena Camerin (first round)
22. (Germany) Sandra Klösel (first round)
23. (Japan) Ayumi Morita (first round)
24. (Paraguay) Rossana de los Ríos (qualified)

=== Qualifiers ===
1. (Russia) Galina Voskoboeva
2. (Russia) Ekaterina Bychkova
3. (Czech Republic) Petra Kvitová
4. (Russia) Anastasia Rodionova
5. (Paraguay) Rossana de los Ríos
6. (Russia) Alisa Kleybanova
7. (Belarus) Tatiana Poutchek
8. (Japan) Aiko Nakamura
9. (United States) Vania King
10. (Canada) Aleksandra Wozniak
11. (Switzerland) Emmanuelle Gagliardi
12. (Ukraine) Olga Savchuk

=== Lucky losers ===
1. (Ukraine) Mariya Koryttseva
2. (Thailand) Tamarine Tanasugarn

=== Qualifying draw ===
==== First qualifier ====
First round					Qualifying competition
1	(Switzerland) Timea Bacsinszky	7^{7}	5	3
	(Hungary) Melinda Czink	6^{5}	7	6		(Hungary) Melinda Czink	3	6	6^{5}
	(Croatia) Karolina Šprem	2	6	1	20	(Russia) Galina Voskoboeva	6	4	7^{7}
20	(Russia) Galina Voskoboeva	6	4	6

==== Second qualifier ====
First round				Qualifying competition
2	(Ukraine) Mariya Koryttseva	6	6
	(Russia) Evgeniya Rodina	3	4	2	(Ukraine) Mariya Koryttseva	1	5
WC	(United States) Sloane Stephens	1	5	16	(Russia) Ekaterina Bychkova	6	7
16	(Russia) Ekaterina Bychkova	6	7

==== Third qualifier ====
First round					Qualifying competition
3	(Argentina) María Emilia Salerni	6	3	3
	(Czech Republic) Petra Kvitová	2	6	6		(Czech Republic) Petra Kvitová	6	6
WC	(Belgium) Tamaryn Hendler	4	7	6	WC	(Belgium) Tamaryn Hendler	1	1
23	(Japan) Ayumi Morita	6	5	0

==== Fourth qualifier ====
First round					Qualifying competition
4	(Russia) Anastasia Rodionova	7^{7}	6
	(United States) Ahsha Rolle	6^{4}	0		4	(Russia) Anastasia Rodionova	6	3	6
	(United Kingdom) Anne Keothavong	2	6	6		(United Kingdom) Anne Keothavong	1	6	3
15	(Colombia) Catalina Castaño	6	1	2

==== Fifth qualifier ====
First round				Qualifying competition
5	(Thailand) Tamarine Tanasugarn	6	6
WC	(United Kingdom) Anna Fitzpatrick	2	3	5	(Thailand) Tamarine Tanasugarn	4	6^{5}
	(Russia) Alina Jidkova	6^{3}	5	24	(Paraguay) Rossana de los Ríos	6	7^{7}
24	(Paraguay) Rossana de los Ríos	7^{7}	7

==== Sixth qualifier ====
First round				Qualifying competition
6	(Russia) Alisa Kleybanova	6	6
	(Hungary) Gréta Arn	4	2	6	(Russia) Alisa Kleybanova	6	6
	(United States) Mashona Washington	6	6		(United States) Mashona Washington	1	2
22	(Germany) Sandra Klösel	3	3

==== Seventh qualifier ====
First round				Qualifying competition
7	(China) Yuan Meng	7	7^{7}
WC	(United States) Gail Brodsky	5	6^{4}	7	(China) Yuan Meng	0	2
	(Belarus) Tatiana Poutchek	7	6		(Belarus) Tatiana Poutchek	6	6
13	(Chinese Taipei) Hsieh Su-wei	5	4

==== Eighth qualifier ====
First round					Qualifying competition
8	(Japan) Aiko Nakamura	3	6	6
	(Czech Republic) Renata Voráčová	6	4	2	8	(Japan) Aiko Nakamura	6	6
	(Czech Republic) Barbora Strýcová	4	0		17	(Luxembourg) Anne Kremer	1	3
17	(Luxembourg) Anne Kremer	6	6

==== Ninth qualifier ====
First round				Qualifying competition
9	(United States) Julie Ditty	3	1
	(United States) Vania King	6	6		(United States) Vania King	6	6
	(Netherlands) Brenda Schultz-McCarthy	4	6^{6}	14	(Russia) Alla Kudryavtseva	1	2
14	(Russia) Alla Kudryavtseva	6	7^{8}

==== Tenth qualifier ====
First round					Qualifying competition
10	(Czech Republic) Petra Cetkovská	6^{5}	6	6
WC	(Georgia (country)) Anna Tatishvili	7^{7}	4	0	10	(Czech Republic) Petra Cetkovská	4	1
	(Canada) Aleksandra Wozniak	6	6			(Canada) Aleksandra Wozniak	6	6
19	(Ukraine) Yuliana Fedak	4	2

==== Eleventh qualifier ====
First round				Qualifying competition
11	(United States) Lilia Osterloh	7	6
	(Germany) Julia Schruff	5	1	11	(United States) Lilia Osterloh	1	3
	(Switzerland) Emmanuelle Gagliardi	6	6		(Switzerland) Emmanuelle Gagliardi	6	6
21	(Italy) Maria Elena Camerin	3	4

==== Twelfth qualifier ====
First round				Qualifying competition
12	(Ukraine) Olga Savchuk	6	6
	(United States) Bethanie Mattek	1	4	12	(Ukraine) Olga Savchuk	5	6	6
WC	(United States) Audra Cohen	7^{7}	6	WC	(United States) Audra Cohen	7	2	4
18	(Russia) Olga Puchkova	6^{3}	3
