= 2008 Sony Ericsson Open – Women's doubles =

Women's doubles
- 2008 Sony Ericsson Open

Final
- Champions: (Slovenia) Katarina Srebotnik (Japan) Ai Sugiyama
- Runners-up: (Zimbabwe) Cara Black (United States) Liezel Huber
- Score: 7–5, 4–6, [10–3]

Events
Singles	men	women
Doubles	men	women
- Sony Ericsson Open

Lisa Raymond and Samantha Stosur were the defending champions, but Stosur chose not to participate, and only Raymond competed that year.
Raymond partnered with Elena Likhovtseva, but lost in the quarterfinals to Květa Peschke and Rennae Stubbs.

Katarina Srebotnik and Ai Sugiyama won in the final 7–5, 4–6, [10–3] against Cara Black and Liezel Huber.

== Seeds ==
1. (Zimbabwe) Cara Black / (United States) Liezel Huber (final)
2. (Slovenia) Katarina Srebotnik / (Japan) Ai Sugiyama (champions)
3. (Czech Republic) Květa Peschke / (Australia) Rennae Stubbs (semifinals)
4. (Chinese Taipei) Yung-jan Chan / (Chinese Taipei) Chia-jung Chuang (second round)
5. (China) Yan Zi / (China) Zheng Jie (first round)
6. (Ukraine) Alona Bondarenko / (Ukraine) Kateryna Bondarenko (second round)
7. (Belarus) Victoria Azarenka / (Israel) Shahar Pe'er (semifinals)
8. (Russia) Elena Likhovtseva / (United States) Lisa Raymond (quarterfinals)

== Draw ==
Key

- Q = Qualifier
- WC = Wild card
- LL = Lucky loser
- Alt = Alternate
- ITF = ITF entry
- PR = Protected ranking
- SR = Special ranking
- SE = Special exempt
- JE = Junior exempt
- JR = Junior Accelerator Programme entrant
- CO = College Accelerator Programme entrant
- NG = Next Gen Accelerator Program entrant
- w/o = Walkover
- r = Retired
- d = Defaulted

=== Finals ===
Semifinals
1	(Zimbabwe) Cara Black (United States) Liezel Huber	6	6
3	(Czech Republic) Květa Peschke (Australia) Rennae Stubbs	3	3
7	(Belarus) Victoria Azarenka (Israel) Shahar Pe'er	0	3
2	(Slovenia) Katarina Srebotnik (Japan) Ai Sugiyama	6	6

Final
1	(Zimbabwe) Cara Black (United States) Liezel Huber	5	6	[3]
2	(Slovenia) Katarina Srebotnik (Japan) Ai Sugiyama	7	4	[10]

=== Top half ===
First round
1	(Zimbabwe) C Black (United States) L Huber	2	7	[10]
(Ukraine) M Koryttseva (Czech Republic) V Uhlířová	6	5	[7]
(Switzerland) P Schnyder (United States) M Shaughnessy	3	1
(United States) B Mattek (United States) M Washington	6	6
(China) S Peng (China) T Sun	7	6
(Argentina) G Dulko (Argentina) ME Salerni	5	1
(Germany) M Müller (Czech Republic) G Navrátilová	2	1
6	(Ukraine) A Bondarenko (Ukraine) K Bondarenko	6	6
3	(Czech Republic) K Peschke (Australia) R Stubbs	2	6	[10]
(Russia) A Kudryavtseva (Russia) G Voskoboeva	6	3	[5]
(Italy) ME Camerin (United States) J Craybas	6^{3}	6^{5}
(Russia) D Safina (Hungary) Á Szávay	7	7
(France) É Loit (Czech Republic) B Záhlavová-Strýcová	1	6	[10]
(Chinese Taipei) S-w Hsieh (United States) V King	6	4	[7]
WC	(Belgium) T Hendler (Czech Republic) N Vaidišová	3	2
8	(Russia) E Likhovtseva (United States) L Raymond	6	6

Second round
1	(Zimbabwe) C Black (United States) L Huber	6	6
(United States) B Mattek (United States) M Washington	4	1
(China) S Peng (China) T Sun	7	6
6	(Ukraine) A Bondarenko (Ukraine) K Bondarenko	6^{1}	1
3	(Czech Republic) K Peschke (Australia) R Stubbs	6	6
(Russia) D Safina (Hungary) Á Szávay	2	3
(France) É Loit (Czech Republic) B Záhlavová-Strýcová	5	4
8	(Russia) E Likhovtseva (United States) L Raymond	7	6

Quarterfinals
1	(Zimbabwe) C Black (United States) L Huber	6	4	[10]
(China) S Peng (China) T Sun	3	6	[6]
3	(Czech Republic) K Peschke (Australia) R Stubbs	3	6	[10]
8	(Russia) E Likhovtseva (United States) L Raymond	6	3	[6]

Semifinals
1	(Zimbabwe) C Black (United States) L Huber	6	6
3	(Czech Republic) K Peschke (Australia) R Stubbs	3	3

=== Bottom half ===
First round
7	(Belarus) V Azarenka (Israel) S Pe'er	7	6^{4}	[10]
(Italy) F Pennetta (Italy) F Schiavone	6^{4}	7	[6]
ALT	(Uzbekistan) A Amanmuradova (Denmark) C Wozniacki	6	3	[10]
(Spain) A Medina Garrigues (Spain) V Ruano Pascual	4	6	[5]
(Ukraine) T Perebiynis (Poland) A Radwańska	6^{7}	6	[6]
WC	(Russia) S Kuznetsova (France) A Mauresmo	7	4	[10]
(Belarus) T Poutchek (Russia) A Rodionova	1	2
4	(Chinese Taipei) Y-j Chan (Chinese Taipei) C-j Chuang	6	6
5	(China) Z Yan (China) J Zheng	3	6	[8]
WC	(United States) L Davenport (Slovakia) D Hantuchová	6	2	[10]
(Russia) Y Shvedova (Thailand) T Tanasugarn	4	6	[10]
(France) N Dechy (Russia) V Zvonareva	6	1	[1]
(Italy) T Garbin (Netherlands) M Krajicek	6^{4}	6	[6]
(Czech Republic) L Hradecká (Czech Republic) R Voráčová	7	2	[10]
ALT	(Russia) A Jidkova (Japan) A Morigami	4	3
2	(Slovenia) K Srebotnik (Japan) A Sugiyama	6	6

Second round
7	(Belarus) V Azarenka (Israel) S Pe'er	6	6
ALT	(Uzbekistan) A Amanmuradova (Denmark) C Wozniacki	3	3
WC	(Russia) S Kuznetsova (France) A Mauresmo	6	6
4	(Chinese Taipei) Y-j Chan (Chinese Taipei) C-j Chuang	2	2
WC	(United States) L Davenport (Slovakia) D Hantuchová	6	6
(Russia) Y Shvedova (Thailand) T Tanasugarn	1	1
(Czech Republic) L Hradecká (Czech Republic) R Voráčová	4	3
2	(Slovenia) K Srebotnik (Japan) A Sugiyama	6	6

Quarterfinals
7	(Belarus) V Azarenka (Israel) S Pe'er	7	4	[10]
WC	(Russia) S Kuznetsova (France) A Mauresmo	5	6	[6]
WC	(United States) L Davenport (Slovakia) D Hantuchová	4	6	[4]
2	(Slovenia) K Srebotnik (Japan) A Sugiyama	6	3	[10]

Semifinals
7	(Belarus) V Azarenka (Israel) S Pe'er	0	3
2	(Slovenia) K Srebotnik (Japan) A Sugiyama	6	6
