= 2007 Sony Ericsson Open – Women's doubles =

Women's doubles
- 2007 Sony Ericsson Open

Final
- Champion: (United States) Lisa Raymond (Australia) Samantha Stosur
- Runner-up: (Zimbabwe) Cara Black (South Africa) Liezel Huber
- Score: 6-4, 3-6, [10-2]

Events
Singles	men	women
Doubles	men	women
← 2006 ·	Sony Ericsson Open	· 2008 →

Lisa Raymond and Samantha Stosur were the defending champions at the 2007 Sony Ericsson Open. They successfully defended their title by beating Cara Black and Liezel Huber 6–4, 3–6, [10-2] in the final.

== Seeds ==
1. (United States) Lisa Raymond / (Australia) Samantha Stosur (champions)
2. (Zimbabwe) Cara Black / (South Africa) Liezel Huber (final)
3. (China) Yan Zi / (China) Zheng Jie (quarterfinals)
4. (Czech Republic) Květa Peschke / (Australia) Rennae Stubbs (second round)
5. (Slovenia) Katarina Srebotnik / (Japan) Ai Sugiyama (first round)
6. (Spain) Virginia Ruano Pascual / (Argentina) Paola Suárez (first round)
7. (France) Nathalie Dechy / (Russia) Vera Zvonareva (first round)
8. (Chinese Taipei) Chan Yung-jan / (Chinese Taipei) Chuang Chia-jung (semifinals)

== Draw ==
=== Key ===
- Q = Qualifier
- WC = Wild card
- LL = Lucky loser
- Alt = Alternate
- SE = Special exempt
- PR = Protected ranking
- ITF = ITF entry
- JE = Junior exempt
- w/o = Walkover
- r = Retired
- d = Defaulted
- SR = Special ranking

=== Final ===
Semifinals
1	(United States) L Raymond (Australia) S Stosur	6	6
8	(Chinese Taipei) Chan Yung-jan (Chinese Taipei) Chuang Chia-jung	4	4
WC	(Slovakia) D Hantuchová (Switzerland) M Hingis	4	3
2	(Zimbabwe) C Black (South Africa) L Huber	6	6

Final
1	(United States) Lisa Raymond (Australia) Samantha Stosur	6	3	[10]
2	(Zimbabwe) C Black (South Africa) L Huber	4	6	[2]

=== Earlier rounds ===
==== Top half ====
First round
1	(United States) L Raymond (Australia) S Stosur	7	6
(France) M Bartoli (United States) M Tu	5	2
(Italy) T Garbin (Australia) A Molik	3	7^{7}	[10]
(Ukraine) Y Fedak (Ukraine) T Perebiynis	6	6^{2}	[7]
(Serbia) A Ivanovic (Russia) M Kirilenko	6^{1}	6	[10]
(France) É Loit (Australia) N Pratt	7^{7}	4	[12]
(Russia) S Kuznetsova (Russia) N Petrova	7	6
7	(France) N Dechy (Russia) V Zvonareva	5	3
3	(China) Z Yan (China) J Zheng	6	7^{7}
(Russia) A Rodionova (China) T Sun	3	6^{4}
(United States) A Harkleroad (United States) B Mattek	6	0	[6]
(United States) V King (Israel) S Pe'er	1	6	[10]
(Netherlands) M Krajicek (Russia) G Voskoboeva	1	6	[10]
(Italy) F Pennetta (Italy) R Vinci	6	4	[2]
(Greece) E Daniilidou (Germany) J Wöhr	3	0
8	(Chinese Taipei) Y-j Chan (Chinese Taipei) C-j Chuang	6	6

Second round
1	(United States) L Raymond (Australia) S Stosur	6	7
(Italy) T Garbin (Australia) A Molik	3	5
(France) É Loit (Australia) N Pratt	6	6
(Russia) S Kuznetsova (Russia) N Petrova	1	3
3	(China) Z Yan (China) J Zheng	6	6
(United States) V King (Israel) S Pe'er	0	4
(Netherlands) M Krajicek (Russia) G Voskoboeva	3	6	[5]
8	(Chinese Taipei) Y-j Chan (Chinese Taipei) C-j Chuang	6	4	[10]

Quarterfinals
1	(United States) L Raymond (Australia) S Stosur	6	6
(France) É Loit (Australia) N Pratt	3	0
3	(China) Z Yan (China) J Zheng	4	4
8	(Chinese Taipei) Y-j Chan (Chinese Taipei) C-j Chuang	6	6

Semifinals
1	(United States) L Raymond (Australia) S Stosur	6	6
8	(Chinese Taipei) Y-j Chan (Chinese Taipei) C-j Chuang	4	4

==== Bottom half ====
First round
5	(Slovenia) K Srebotnik (Japan) A Sugiyama	4	2
WC	(Slovakia) D Hantuchová (Switzerland) M Hingis	6	6
(Russia) E Likhovtseva (Russia) E Vesnina	7	2	[10]
(Slovakia) J Gajdošová (Croatia) J Kostanić Tošić	5	6	[3]
(Italy) M Santangelo (Australia) B Stewart	6	7
(Italy) ME Camerin (Argentina) G Dulko	1	5
(Russia) V Dushevina (Romania) A Ehritt-Vanc	1	3
4	(Czech Republic) K Peschke (Australia) R Stubbs	6	6
6	(Spain) V Ruano Pascual (Argentina) P Suárez	4	6	[10]
(United States) C Morariu (Italy) F Schiavone	6	4	[12]
WC	(Russia) D Safina (France) T Golovin	7	7^{7}
WC	(Belgium) K Clijsters (Belgium) C Maes	5	6^{4}
(Spain) L Domínguez Lino (Spain) A Medina Garrigues	4	4
(Slovakia) J Husárová (United States) M Shaughnessy	6	6
(Ukraine) A Bondarenko (Spain) N Llagostera Vives	4	6	[6]
2	(Zimbabwe) C Black (South Africa) L Huber	6	2	[10]

Second round
WC	(Slovakia) D Hantuchová (Switzerland) M Hingis	6	6
(Russia) E Likhovtseva (Russia) E Vesnina	3	3
(Italy) M Santangelo (Australia) B Stewart	7^{7}	6
4	(Czech Republic) K Peschke (Australia) R Stubbs	6^{3}	2
(United States) C Morariu (Italy) F Schiavone	3	4
WC	(Russia) D Safina (France) T Golovin	6	6
(Slovakia) J Husárová (United States) M Shaughnessy	0	6	[7]
2	(Zimbabwe) C Black (South Africa) L Huber	6	2	[10]

Quarterfinals
WC	(Slovakia) D Hantuchová (Switzerland) M Hingis	6	6
(Italy) M Santangelo (Australia) B Stewart	1	2
WC	(Russia) D Safina (France) T Golovin	4	3
2	(Zimbabwe) C Black (South Africa) L Huber	6	6

Semifinals
WC	(Slovakia) D Hantuchová (Switzerland) M Hingis	4	3
2	(Zimbabwe) C Black (South Africa) L Huber	6	6
