= Kevin Kim =

American tennis player

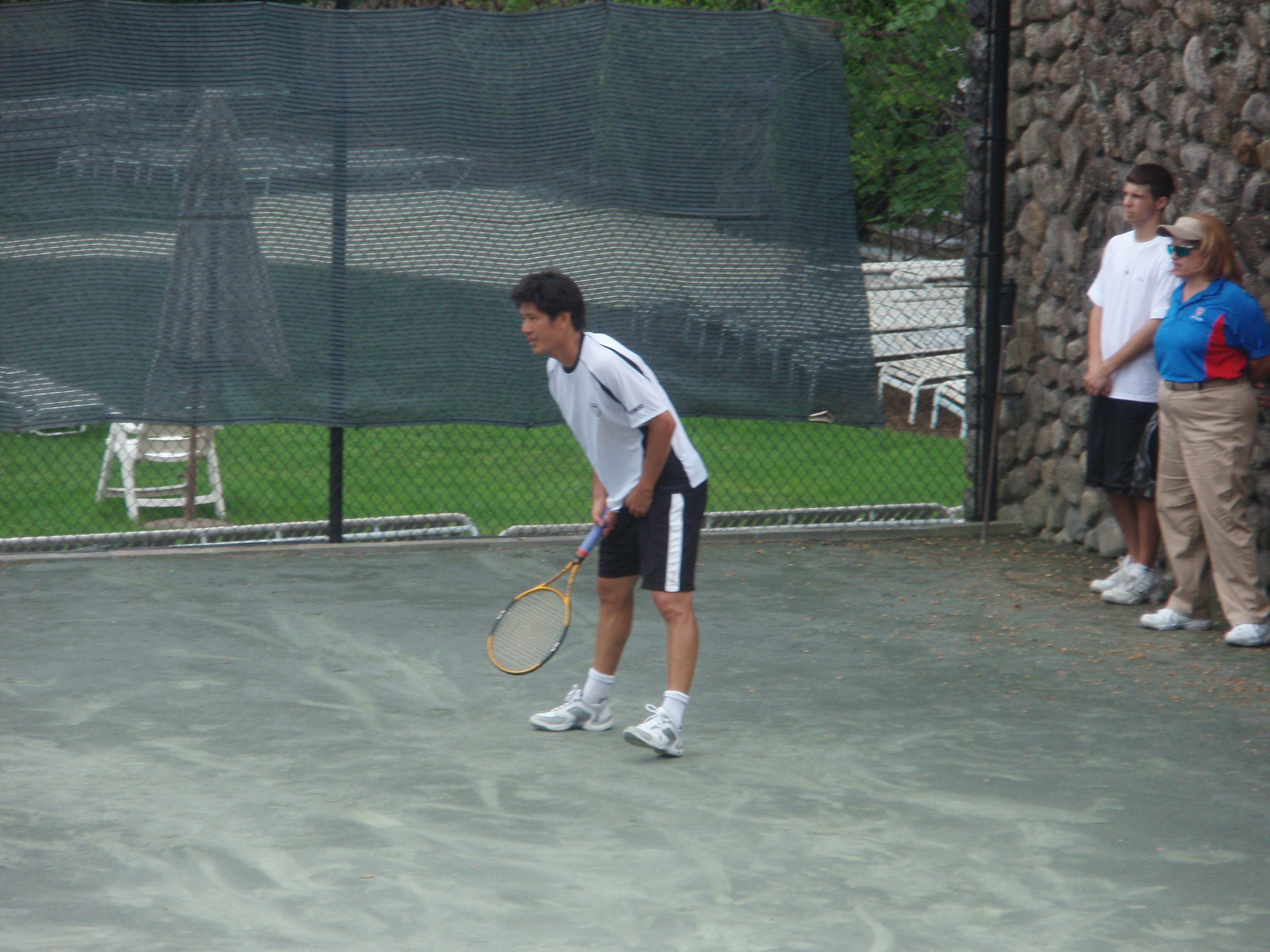
- Country (sports): United States
- Born: July 26, 1978 (age 47) Torrance, California, U.S.
- Height: 5 ft 10 in (178 cm)
- Turned pro: 1997
- Retired: 2015
- Plays: Right-handed (one-handed backhand)
- Prize money: $1,545,790

Singles
- Career record: 44–97
- Career titles: 0
- Highest ranking: No. 63 (March 21, 2005)

Grand Slam singles results
- Australian Open: 3R (2005)
- French Open: 2R (2006)
- Wimbledon: 2R (2005)
- US Open: 2R (2009)

Doubles
- Career record: 19–37
- Career titles: 0
- Highest ranking: No. 118 (August 27, 2001)

Grand Slam doubles results
- Australian Open: 1R (2005, 2007)
- French Open: 3R (2005)
- Wimbledon: 2R (2001, 2007)
- US Open: 2R (2000)
- Last updated on: April 26, 2021.

Kevin Kim (born July 26, 1978) is an American former tennis player.

== Career ==
He entered the top 100 in 2004, reaching a career-high singles ranking of World No. 63 in March 2005.

In 1993, Kim won the USTA National Boys' 16 Indoor Doubles Championship with Michael Russell. Kim lost to Russell in the finals of the 1994 USTA National Boys' 16 Singles Championships. He beat Russell in the finals of the 1994 USTA National Boys' 16 Clay Court Championships, and lost to Russell in the finals of the 1994 Easter Bowl Boys' 16s Championships.

In 1995, he lost to Russell in the finals of the USTA National Boys’ 18 Clay Court Championships. Kim reached the second round in singles and the quarterfinals in doubles with Russell at the 1995 Australian Open Junior Championships.

In 1996, he won the doubles title with Russell at the 1996 Asuncion Bowl in Asuncion, Paraguay. At the 1996 USTA National Boys’ 18 Championships, he lost in the doubles final with Russell to Bob and Mike Bryan. He was a doubles quarterfinalist with Russell at the 1996 Wimbledon junior championships.

Kim reached the third round of the 2005 Australian Open, and won 9 Challenger titles in his career.

== Performance timelines ==
Key
W	F	SF	QF	#R	RR	Q#	DNQ	A	NH

(W) winner; (F) finalist; (SF) semifinalist; (QF) quarterfinalist; (#R) rounds 4, 3, 2, 1; (RR) round-robin stage; (Q#) qualification round; (DNQ) did not qualify; (A) absent; (NH) not held; (SR) strike rate (events won / competed); (W–L) win–loss record.

=== Singles ===
Tournament	1996	1997	1998	1999	2000	2001	2002	2003	2004	2005	2006	2007	2008	2009	2010	2011	SR	W–L	Win %
Grand Slam tournaments
Australian Open	A	A	A	Q1	Q1	Q2	Q1	Q2	Q3	3R	2R	1R	Q3	Q1	Q2	Q2	0 / 3	3–3	50%
French Open	A	A	A	A	Q1	Q1	Q3	Q3	1R	1R	2R	Q1	Q1	1R	Q2	A	0 / 4	1–4	20%
Wimbledon	A	A	A	A	Q1	Q1	Q1	Q2	Q2	2R	1R	1R	1R	1R	Q2	A	0 / 5	1–5	17%
US Open	1R	A	Q1	1R	1R	Q1	A	Q2	A	1R	1R	Q1	Q3	2R	Q3	A	0 / 6	1–6	14%
Win–loss	0–1	0–0	0–0	0–1	0–1	0–0	0–0	0–0	0–1	3–4	2–4	0–2	0–1	1–3	0–0	0–0	0 / 18	6–18	25%
ATP World Tour Masters 1000
Indian Wells	A	A	A	A	A	Q2	A	A	Q1	2R	2R	Q1	Q1	1R	Q2	A	0 / 3	2–3	40%
Miami	A	A	A	A	A	Q2	A	A	A	2R	2R	2R	Q1	2R	Q2	A	0 / 4	4–4	50%
Rome	A	A	A	A	A	A	A	A	A	Q1	A	A	A	A	A	A	0 / 0	0–0	–
Hamburg / Madrid (Clay)	A	A	A	A	A	A	A	A	A	Q1	A	A	A	A	A	A	0 / 0	0–0	–
Toronto / Montreal	A	A	A	A	A	A	A	A	A	1R	2R	A	A	Q1	A	A	0 / 2	1–2	33%
Cincinnati	A	A	A	A	A	A	A	A	Q1	Q1	Q2	A	A	Q2	A	A	0 / 0	0–0	–
Win–loss	0–0	0–0	0–0	0–0	0–0	0–0	0–0	0–0	0–0	2–3	3–3	1–1	0–0	1–2	0–0	0–0	0 / 9	7–9	44%

=== Doubles ===
Tournament	1999	2000	2001	2002	2003	2004	2005	2006	2007	SR	W–L	Win %
Grand Slam tournaments
Australian Open	A	A	A	A	A	A	1R	A	1R	0 / 2	0–2	0%
French Open	A	A	A	A	A	A	3R	A	A	0 / 1	2–1	67%
Wimbledon	A	1R	2R	Q1	A	A	1R	1R	2R	0 / 5	2–5	29%
US Open	1R	2R	1R	1R	A	A	1R	A	A	0 / 5	1–5	17%
Win–loss	0–1	1–2	1–2	0–1	0–0	0–0	2–4	0–1	1–2	0 / 13	5–13	–

== ATP Tour career finals ==
=== Doubles: 1 (1 runner-up) ===
Legend Grand Slam tournaments (0–0) ATP World Tour Finals (0–0) ATP World Tour Masters 1000 (0–0) ATP World Tour 500 Series (0–0) ATP World Tour 250 Series (0–1)	Finals by surface Hard (0–0) Clay (0–1) Grass (0–0) Carpet (0–0)

Result	W–L	Date	Tournament	Tier	Surface	Partner	Opponents	Score
Loss	0–1	Jan 2001	Houston, United States	250 Series	Clay	(United States) Jim Thomas	(India) Leander Paes (India) Mahesh Bhupathi	6–7^{(3-7)}, 2–6

== ATP Challenger and ITF Futures finals ==
=== Singles: 21 (9–12) ===
Legend ATP Challenger (9–11) ITF Futures (0–1)	Finals by surface Hard (9–12) Clay (0–0) Grass (0–0) Carpet (0–0)

Result	W–L	Date	Tournament	Tier	Surface	Opponent	Score
Loss	0–1	Jun 1999	USA F7, Berkeley	Futures	Hard	(France) Thomas Dupre	5–7, 6–7
Loss	0–2	Aug 1999	Lexington, United States	Challenger	Hard	(Israel) Harel Levy	4–6, 6–7
Loss	0–3	Jun 2000	Tallahassee, United States	Challenger	Hard	(United States) Jeff Salzenstein	3–6, 2–6
Loss	0–4	Jul 2000	Aptos, United States	Challenger	Hard	(United States) Bob Bryan	4–6, 7–6^{(9–7)}, 4–6
Loss	0–5	Nov 2000	Burbank, United States	Challenger	Hard	(United States) Andy Roddick	1–6, 2–6
Win	1–5	Nov 2001	Burbank, United States	Challenger	Hard	(United States) Vince Spadea	6–2, 6–4
Loss	1–6	Feb 2002	Joplin Challenger, United States	Challenger	Hard	(United States) Jack Brasington	3–6, 6–1, 3–6
Loss	1–7	Feb 2003	Joplin Challenger, United States	Challenger	Hard	(United States) Bob Bryan	6–4, 5–7, 2–6
Win	2–7	Jun 2004	Andorra Challenger, Andorra	Challenger	Hard	(Luxembourg) Gilles Muller	6–4, 6–0
Win	3–7	Jul 2004	Aptos, United States	Challenger	Hard	(Canada) Frank Dancevic	7–6^{(7-2)}, 6–3
Loss	3–8	Oct 2004	Tiburon, United States	Challenger	Hard	(United States) K.J. Hippensteel	3–6, 3–6
Win	4–8	Oct 2004	Burbank, United States	Challenger	Hard	(United States) Robert Kendrick	7–5, 1-6, 6–3
Win	5–8	Feb 2006	Dallas, United States	Challenger	Hard	(United States) Robert Kendrick	1–6, 6-4, 6–1
Loss	5–9	Jul 2006	Cordoba, Spain	Challenger	Hard	(Germany) Simon Greul	7–6^{(7-4)}, 1-6, 6–7^{(2-7)}
Win	6–9	Jun 2007	Yuba City, United States	Challenger	Hard	(United States) Bobby Reynolds	6–4, 0-6, 6–3
Loss	6–10	Nov 2007	Knoxville, United States	Challenger	Hard	(United States) Robert Kendrick	6–3, 2-6, 4–6
Win	7–10	Jul 2008	Aptos, United States	Challenger	Hard	(Italy) Andrea Stoppini	7–5, 6–1
Loss	7–11	Aug 2008	Vancouver, Canada	Challenger	Hard	(Israel) Dudi Sela	3–6, 0-6
Win	8–11	Sep 2008	Tulsa, United States	Challenger	Hard	(United States) Vince Spadea	6–3, 3–5, 6–4
Loss	8–12	Nov 2008	Champaign-Urbana, United States	Challenger	Hard	(South Africa) Kevin Anderson	3–6, 4-6
Win	9–12	Nov 2009	Charlottesville, United States	Challenger	Hard	(India) Somdev Devvarman	6–4, 6–7^{(8-10)}, 6–4

== ATP Challenger and ITF Futures finals ==
=== Doubles: 12 (5–7) ===
Legend ATP Challenger (2–7) ITF Futures (3–0)	Finals by surface Hard (3–7) Clay (2–0) Grass (0–0) Carpet (0–0)

Result	W–L	Date	Tournament	Tier	Surface	Partner	Opponents	Score
Win	1–0	Mar 1999	Japan F1, Isawa	Futures	Clay	(South Korea) Lee Hyung-Taik	(United States) Mitty Arnold (United States) Todd Meringoff	6–4, 6–4
Win	2–0	May 1999	USA F5, Boca Raton	Futures	Clay	(Venezuela) Yohny Romero	(Australia) Lee Pearson (United States) Michael Jessup	6–4, 6–7, 6–2
Win	3–0	Jul 1999	Granby, Canada	Challenger	Hard	(Venezuela) Jimy Szymanski	(Israel) Harel Levy (Israel) Lior Mor	4–6, 6–1, 6–4
Loss	3–1	Aug 1999	Lexington, United States	Challenger	Hard	(United States) Scott Humphries	(United States) Michael Sell (Romania) Gabriel Trifu	6–7, 7–6, 4–6
Loss	3–2	Aug 1999	Binghamton, United States	Challenger	Hard	(South Korea) Lee Hyung-Taik	(United States) Mitch Sprengelmeyer (South Africa) Jason Weir-Smith	7–5, 4–6, 2–6
Loss	3–3	Jul 2000	Aptos, United States	Challenger	Hard	(Australia) Luke Smith	(United States) Bob Bryan (United States) Mike Bryan	4–6, 6–3, 4–6
Loss	3–4	Sep 2000	Houston, United States	Challenger	Hard	(United States) James Blake	(South Africa) Brent Haygarth (South Africa) Marcos Ondruska	4–6, 2–6
Loss	3–5	Apr 2002	Tarzana, United States	Challenger	Hard	(United States) Brandon Coupe	(Switzerland) George Bastl (South Africa) Neville Godwin	3–6, 6–4, 3–6
Win	4–5	Mar 2003	USA F6, Mobile	Futures	Hard	(United States) Michael Joyce	(United States) Travis Parrott (Brazil) Josh Goffi	6–7^{(0–7)}, 6–3, 7–5
Loss	4–6	Apr 2003	Calabasas, United States	Challenger	Hard	(United States) Jim Thomas	(United States) Scott Humphries (United States) Justin Gimelstob	3–6, 3–6
Win	5–6	Jul 2006	Cordoba, Spain	Challenger	Hard	(United States) Justin Gimelstob	(Germany) Ivo Klec (Czech Republic) Jan Mertl	6–3, 7–5
Loss	5–7	Apr 2008	Humacao, Puerto Rico	Challenger	Hard	(United States) Lester Cook	(United States) Bobby Reynolds (United States) Rajeev Ram	3–6, 4–6
