= 2008 Sony Ericsson Open =

- Date: March 26 – April 6
- Edition: 24th
- Category: ATP Masters Series (men); Tier I Series (women)
- Surface: Hard / outdoor
- Location: Key Biscayne, Florida, U.S.
- Venue: Tennis Center at Crandon Park

Champions

Men's singles
- (Russia) Nikolay Davydenko

Women's singles
- (United States) Serena Williams

Men's doubles
- (United States) Bob Bryan / (United States) Mike Bryan

Women's doubles
- (Slovenia) Katarina Srebotnik / (Japan) Ai Sugiyama
← 2007 ·	Miami Open	· 2009 →

The 2008 Miami Masters (also known as the Sony Ericsson Open for sponsorship reasons) was a tennis tournament played on outdoor hard courts. It was the 24th edition of the Miami Masters, and was part of the ATP Masters Series of the 2008 ATP Tour, and of the Tier I Series of the 2008 WTA Tour. Both the men's and the women's events took place at the Tennis Center at Crandon Park in Key Biscayne, Florida, United States, from March 26 through April 6, 2008.

The men's field was headlined by World No. 1 and Masters Cup champion Roger Federer, Chennai finalist Andy Roddick, and Australian Open champion, Indian Wells Masters winner and defending champion Novak Djokovic. Other top players in the field were 2007 Moscow titlist Nikolay Davydenko, Masters Cup runner-up David Ferrer, Andy Roddick, David Nalbandian and Richard Gasquet.

The women's field was led by World No. 1 and Tour Championships winner Justine Henin, Australian Open runner-up and Indian Wells champion Ana Ivanovic, and Indian Wells finalist Svetlana Kuznetsova. Among other players competing were Australian Open semifinalist and Indian Wells semifinalist Jelena Janković, Paris titlist Anna Chakvetadze, Venus Williams, Daniela Hantuchová and Serena Williams.

== Finals ==
=== Men's singles ===
(Russia) Nikolay Davydenko defeated (Spain) Rafael Nadal 6–4, 6–2

- It was Davydenko's 1st title of the year, and his 12th overall. It was his 1st Masters title of the year, and his 2nd overall.

=== Women's singles ===
(United States) Serena Williams defeated (Serbia) Jelena Janković 6–1, 5–7, 6–3

- It was Williams's 2nd title of the year, and her 30th overall. It was her 1st Tier I title of the year, her 9th overall, her 5th win at the event, and her 2nd consecutive one.

=== Men's doubles ===
(United States) Bob Bryan / (United States) Mike Bryan defeated (India) Mahesh Bhupathi / (The Bahamas) Mark Knowles 6–2, 6–2

=== Women's doubles ===
(Slovenia) Katarina Srebotnik / (Japan) Ai Sugiyama defeated (Zimbabwe) Cara Black / (United States) Liezel Huber 7–5, 4–6, [10–3]
