= 2007 Sony Ericsson Open – Women's singles =

Women's singles
- 2007 Sony Ericsson Open

Final
- Champion: (United States) Serena Williams
- Runner-up: (Belgium) Justine Henin
- Score: 0–6, 7–5, 6–3

Details
- Draw: 96
- Seeds: 32

Events
Singles	men	women
Doubles	men	women
← 2006 ·	Sony Ericsson Open	· 2008 →

Serena Williams defeated Justine Henin in the final, 0–6, 7–5, 6–3 to win the women's singles tennis title at the 2007 Miami Open. She saved two championship points en route to the title, being down in the final 0-6, 4-5 15-40.

== Seeds ==
All seeds received a bye into the second round.

1. (Russia) Maria Sharapova (fourth round)
2. (Belgium) Justine Henin (finals)
3. (Russia) Svetlana Kuznetsova (fourth round)
4. (Belgium) Kim Clijsters (fourth round)
5. (Switzerland) Martina Hingis (third round)
6. (Russia) Nadia Petrova (quarterfinals)
7. (Serbia) Jelena Janković (third round)
8. (Czech Republic) Nicole Vaidišová (quarterfinals)
9. (Russia) Anna Chakvetadze (semifinals)
10. (Russia) Dinara Safina (fourth round)
11. (Switzerland) Patty Schnyder (second round)
12. (Serbia) Ana Ivanovic (second round)
13. (United States) Serena Williams (champion)
14. (Israel) Shahar Pe'er (semifinals)
15. (China) Li Na (quarterfinals)
16. (Slovakia) Daniela Hantuchová (third round)
17. (France) Tatiana Golovin (third round)
18. (Russia) Vera Zvonareva (fourth round)
19. (Italy) Francesca Schiavone (second round)
20. (Slovenia) Katarina Srebotnik (third round)
21. (France) Marion Bartoli (second round)
22. (Japan) Ai Sugiyama (third round)
23. (Czech Republic) Lucie Šafářová (third round)
24. (Italy) Tathiana Garbin (quarterfinals)
25. (Australia) Samantha Stosur (third round)
26. (Spain) Anabel Medina Garrigues (second round)
27. (China) Zheng Jie (second round)
28. (Ukraine) Alona Bondarenko (second round)
29. (Russia) Maria Kirilenko (second round)
30. (France) Séverine Brémond (second round)
31. (Germany) Martina Müller (second round)
32. (Italy) Mara Santangelo (fourth round)

== Draw ==
=== Key ===
- Q = Qualifier
- WC = Wild card
- LL = Lucky loser
- Alt = Alternate
- SE = Special exempt
- PR = Protected ranking
- ITF = ITF entry
- JE = Junior exempt
- w/o = Walkover
- r = Retired
- d = Defaulted
- SR = Special ranking

=== Finals ===
Quarter-finals
13	(United States) Serena Williams	6	6
8	(Czech Republic) Nicole Vaidišová	1	4
14	(Israel) Shahar Pe'er	6	6
24	(Italy) Tathiana Garbin	0	3
9	(Russia) Anna Chakvetadze	4	7	6
15	(China) Li Na	6	5	2
6	(Russia) Nadia Petrova	6^{4}	6^{4}
2	(Belgium) Justine Henin	7	7

Semi-finals
13	(United States) Serena Williams	7	6
14	(Israel) Shahar Pe'er	6^{4}	1
9	(Russia) Anna Chakvetadze	2	3
2	(Belgium) Justine Henin	6	6

Final
13	(United States) Serena Williams	0	7	6
2	(Belgium) Justine Henin	6	5	3

=== Top half ===
==== Section 1 ====
First round
(Chinese Taipei) Y-J Chan	6	6
(Spain) N Llagostera Vives	3	2
(Ukraine) Y Fedak	5	2
(United States) V Williams	7	6
(France) É Loit	2	6	6
(Austria) S Bammer	6	3	1
(Russia) E Likhovtseva	5	4
Q	(Russia) A Rodionova	7	6

Second round
1	(Russia) M Sharapova	6	6
(Chinese Taipei) Y-J Chan	2	3
(United States) V Williams	6	6
29	(Russia) M Kirilenko	3	3
23	(Czech Republic) L Šafářová	6	7
(France) É Loit	0	5
Q	(Russia) A Rodionova	3	3
13	(United States) S Williams	6	6

Third round
1	(Russia) M Sharapova	2	6	7
(United States) V Williams	6	2	5
23	(Czech Republic) L Šafářová	3	4
13	(United States) S Williams	6	6

Fourth round
1	(Russia) M Sharapova	1	1
13	(United States) S Williams	6	6

==== Section 2 ====
First round
(Bulgaria) T Pironkova	4	3
(Estonia) K Kanepi	6	6
Q	(Russia) V Dushevina	6	3	6
(Australia) N Pratt	3	6	3
(Belarus) V Azarenka	6	6
LL	(Thailand) T Tanasugarn	0	4
(Netherlands) M Krajicek	6	7
WC	(Georgia (country)) A Tatishvili	3	6^{2}

Second round
11	(Switzerland) P Schnyder	1	4
(Estonia) K Kanepi	6	6
Q	(Russia) V Dushevina	7	2	6
21	(France) M Bartoli	6^{5}	6	4
26	(Spain) A Medina Garrigues	4	5
(Belarus) V Azarenka	6	7
(Netherlands) M Krajicek	6	5	2
8	(Czech Republic) N Vaidišová	4	7	6

Third round
(Estonia) K Kanepi	1	1
Q	(Russia) V Dushevina	6	6
(Belarus) V Azarenka	3	3
8	(Czech Republic) N Vaidišová	6	6

Fourth round
Q	(Russia) V Dushevina	2	4
8	(Czech Republic) N Vaidišová	6	6

==== Section 3 ====
First round
Q	(Ukraine) K Bondarenko	6	0	6
(Japan) A Nakamura	2	6	1
Q	(Uzbekistan) V Lepchenko	3	3
(Croatia) J Kostanić Tošić	6	6
Q	(Ukraine) J Vakulenko	6	6
(Greece) E Daniilidou	4	3
Q	(Slovakia) J Gajdošová	3	5
(Colombia) C Castaño	6	7

Second round
3	(Russia) S Kuznetsova	7	6^{5}	6
Q	(Ukraine) K Bondarenko	6^{4}	7	3
(Croatia) J Kostanić Tošić	6	7
28	(Ukraine) A Bondarenko	3	5
19	(Italy) F Schiavone	6	6^{0}	4
Q	(Ukraine) J Vakulenko	3	7	6
(Colombia) C Castaño	2	1
14	(Israel) S Pe'er	6	6

Third round
3	(Russia) S Kuznetsova	6	6
(Croatia) J Kostanić Tošić	4	2
Q	(Ukraine) J Vakulenko	6^{5}	5
14	(Israel) S Pe'er	7	7

Fourth round
3	(Russia) S Kuznetsova	4	6	3
14	(Israel) S Pe'er	6	4	6

==== Section 4 ====
First round
Q	(Russia) Y Shvedova	6	6
WC	(Slovakia) D Cibulková	3	1
(United States) A Harkleroad	6	6
WC	(United States) L Albanese	4	2
(Poland) A Radwańska	6	6
(United States) S Perry	2	1
(Argentina) G Dulko	3	3
Q	(Czech Republic) I Benešová	6	6

Second round
12	(Serbia) A Ivanovic	5	4
Q	(Russia) Y Shvedova	7	6
(United States) A Harkleroad	3	2
24	(Italy) T Garbin	6	6
27	(China) J Zheng	3	4
(Poland) A Radwańska	6	6
Q	(Czech Republic) I Benešová	3	2
5	(Switzerland) M Hingis	6	6

Third round
Q	(Russia) Y Shvedova	6	3	2
24	(Italy) T Garbin	4	6	6
(Poland) A Radwańska	4	6	6
5	(Switzerland) M Hingis	6	3	2

Fourth round
24	(Italy) T Garbin	6	6
(Poland) A Radwańska	4	2

=== Bottom half ===
==== Section 5 ====
First round
(China) S Peng	6	6
(Russia) E Vesnina	0	0
(United States) J Craybas	6	2	6
(Italy) R Vinci	3	6	0
WC	(Uzbekistan) I Tulyaganova	6	2	r
Q	(Belarus) T Poutchek	0	6
(Russia) V Bardina	6	6
WC	(Croatia) S Ančić	3	2

Second round
7	(Serbia) J Janković	6	6
(China) S Peng	2	4
(United States) J Craybas	3	1
32	(Italy) M Santangelo	6	6
17	(France) T Golovin	6	7
Q	(Belarus) T Poutchek	1	6^{8}
(Russia) V Bardina	1	0
9	(Russia) A Chakvetadze	6	6

Third round
7	(Serbia) J Janković	6	6^{3}	4
32	(Italy) M Santangelo	2	7	6
17	(France) T Golovin	1	3
9	(Russia) A Chakvetadze	6	6

Fourth round
32	(Italy) M Santangelo	1	5
9	(Russia) A Chakvetadze	6	7

==== Section 6 ====
First round
Q	(Austria) T Paszek	6	6
(Australia) A Molik	3	4
WC	(Croatia) P Martić	6	4	6^{5}
(Russia) A Jidkova	4	6	7
Q	(Sweden) S Arvidsson	6	3	2
(Russia) O Poutchkova	2	6	6
(Japan) A Morigami	6	7
WC	(Canada) A Wozniak	1	5

Second round
15	(China) N Li	6	6
Q	(Austria) T Paszek	2	0
(Russia) A Jidkova	4	3
20	(Slovenia) K Srebotnik	6	6
25	(Australia) S Stosur	6	6
(Russia) O Poutchkova	2	2
(Japan) A Morigami	6	0	0
4	(Belgium) K Clijsters	4	6	6

Third round
15	(China) N Li	6	6
20	(Slovenia) K Srebotnik	1	0
25	(Australia) S Stosur	4	2
4	(Belgium) K Clijsters	6	6

Fourth round
15	(China) N Li	4	6	6
4	(Belgium) K Clijsters	6	4	2

==== Section 7 ====
First round
(France) N Dechy	6	6
(France) C Pin	1	3
Q	(Russia) E Bychkova	6	6
(France) A Rezaï	1	4
(Italy) M E Camerin	5	7	2
(Belarus) A Yakimova	7	5	6
(Spain) L Domínguez Lino	4	6^{0}
(United States) L Granville	6	7

Second round
6	(Russia) N Petrova	6	3	7
(France) N Dechy	4	6	6^{2}
Q	(Russia) E Bychkova	6	7
30	(France) S Brémond	4	5
22	(Japan) Ai Sugiyama	6	6
(Belarus) A Yakimova	4	0
(United States) L Granville	1	1
10	(Russia) D Safina	6	6

Third round
6	(Russia) N Petrova	6	6
Q	(Russia) E Bychkova	1	1
22	(Japan) Ai Sugiyama	4	6	1
10	(Russia) D Safina	6	3	6

Fourth round
6	(Russia) N Petrova	3	6	6
10	(Russia) D Safina	6	2	4

==== Section 8 ====
First round
(United States) M Shaughnessy	6	2	6^{3}
WC	(Portugal) M Larcher De Brito	3	6	7
(United States) M Tu	6	6
(Italy) R Oprandi	3	3
(Italy) F Pennetta	4	2
(France) V Razzano	6	6
(United States) V King	7	7
(China) T Sun	6^{4}	5

Second round
16	(Slovakia) D Hantuchová	7	6
WC	(Portugal) M Larcher De Brito	5	0
(United States) M Tu	4	2
18	(Russia) V Zvonareva	6	6
31	(Germany) M Müller	4	6^{2}
(France) V Razzano	6	7^{7}
(United States) V King	4	1
2	(Belgium) J Henin	6	6

Third round
16	(Slovakia) D Hantuchová	4	2
18	(Russia) V Zvonareva	6	6
(France) V Razzano	2	6	6^{5}
2	(Belgium) J Henin	6	2	7

Fourth round
18	(Russia) V Zvonareva	3	2
2	(Belgium) J Henin	6	6
