= 2007 Sony Ericsson Open – Men's singles =

Men's singles
- 2007 Sony Ericsson Open

Final
- Champion: (Serbia) Novak Djokovic
- Runner-up: (Argentina) Guillermo Cañas
- Score: 6–3, 6–2, 6–4

Details
- Draw: 96 (12Q / 5WC)
- Seeds: 32

Events
Singles	men	women
Doubles	men	women
← 2006 ·	Sony Ericsson Open	· 2008 →

Novak Djokovic defeated Guillermo Cañas in the final, 6–3, 6–2, 6–4 to win the men's singles tennis title at the 2007 Miami Open. It was his first Masters title, and the first of an eventual record 40 Masters titles. Djokovic did not lose a set during the tournament. Djokovic was the youngest men's singles champion in Miami Open history, until surpassed by Carlos Alcaraz in 2022.

Roger Federer was the two-time defending champion, but lost in the fourth round to Cañas.

This was the last Masters tournament to feature a best-of-five-sets final.

== Seeds ==
All thirty-two seeds received a bye to the second round.

1. (Switzerland) Roger Federer (fourth round)
2. (Spain) Rafael Nadal (quarterfinals)
3. (United States) Andy Roddick (quarterfinals, retired due to a hamstring injury)
4. (Russia) Nikolay Davydenko (third round)
5. (Chile) Fernando González (third round)
6. (Spain) Tommy Robredo (quarterfinals)
7. (Croatia) Ivan Ljubičić (semifinals)
8. (United States) James Blake (second round)
9. (Germany) Tommy Haas (second round)
10. (Serbia) Novak Djokovic (champion)
11. (Argentina) David Nalbandian (third round)
12. (United Kingdom) Andy Murray (semifinals)
13. (Spain) David Ferrer (fourth round)
14. (Czech Republic) Tomáš Berdych (third round)
15. (France) Richard Gasquet (third round)
16. (Russia) Mikhail Youzhny (third round)
17. (Cyprus) Marcos Baghdatis (second round)
18. (Germany) Florian Mayer (third round)
19. (Spain) Juan Carlos Ferrero (second round)
20. (Finland) Jarkko Nieminen (fourth round)
21. (Russia) Dmitry Tursunov (second round)
22. (Slovakia) Dominik Hrbatý (second round)
23. (Argentina) Juan Ignacio Chela (quarterfinals)
24. (Czech Republic) Radek Štěpánek (fourth round)
25. (Russia) Marat Safin (second round)
26. (Austria) Jürgen Melzer (second round)
27. (Spain) Carlos Moyá (second round)
28. (Spain) Fernando Verdasco (second round)
29. (Spain) Nicolás Almagro (third round)
30. (Belgium) Olivier Rochus (third Round, withdrew due to a foot injury)
31. (Argentina) José Acasuso (second round)
32. (France) Gilles Simon (third round)

== Draw ==
=== Key ===
- Q = Qualifier
- WC = Wild card
- LL = Lucky loser
- Alt = Alternate
- ITF = ITF entry
- PR = Protected ranking
- SR = Special ranking
- SE = Special exempt
- JE = Junior exempt
- JR = Junior Accelerator Programme entrant
- CO = College Accelerator Programme entrant
- NG = Next Gen Accelerator Program entrant
- w/o = Walkover
- r = Retired
- d = Defaulted

=== Finals ===
Quarterfinals
Q	(Argentina) Guillermo Cañas	7^{7}	6
6	(Spain) Tommy Robredo	6^{5}	1
23	(Argentina) Juan Ignacio Chela	5	3
7	(Croatia) Ivan Ljubičić	7	6
12	(United Kingdom) Andy Murray	5
3	(United States) Andy Roddick	3^{r}
10	(Serbia) Novak Djokovic	6	6
2	(Spain) Rafael Nadal	3	4

Semifinals
Q	(Argentina) Guillermo Cañas	7	6
7	(Croatia) Ivan Ljubičić	5	2
12	(United Kingdom) Andy Murray	1	0
10	(Serbia) Novak Djokovic	6	6

Finals
Q	(Argentina) Guillermo Cañas	3	2	4
10	(Serbia) Novak Djokovic	6	6	6

=== Top half ===
==== Section 1 ====
First round
PR	(Russia) I Andreev	7	2	4
WC	(United States) S Querrey	5	6	6
WC	(United States) A Kuznetsov	4	6^{4}
(Italy) P Starace	6	7^{7}
(United Kingdom) T Henman	6	2	1
Q	(Argentina) G Cañas	3	6	6
PR	(Netherlands) M Verkerk	3	4
(France) S Grosjean	6	6

Second round
1	(Switzerland) R Federer	6	6
WC	(United States) S Querrey	4	3
(Italy) P Starace	6^{2}	3
29	(Spain) N Almagro	7^{7}	6
19	(Spain) J C Ferrero	7^{7}	3	5
Q	(Argentina) G Cañas	6^{5}	6	7
(France) S Grosjean	4	6	2
15	(France) R Gasquet	6	0	6

Third round
1	(Switzerland) R Federer	7	6
29	(Spain) N Almagro	5	3
Q	(Argentina) G Cañas	7^{7}	6
15	(France) R Gasquet	6^{3}	3

Fourth round
1	(Switzerland) R Federer	6^{2}	6	6^{5}
Q	(Argentina) G Cañas	7^{7}	2	7^{7}

==== Section 2 ====
First round
(Argentina) S Roitman	6	3	1
LL	(Colombia) A Falla	4	6	6
(Spain) R Ramírez Hidalgo	5	6	3
(Argentina) G Gaudio	7	1	6
(Russia) I Kunitsyn	1	0
17	(Germany) F Mayer	6	6
Q	(United States) K Kim	6	3	6
(Germany) B Becker	4	6	2

Second round
9	(Germany) T Haas	4	4
LL	(Colombia) A Falla	6	6
(Argentina) G Gaudio	3	2
24	(Czech Republic) R Štěpánek	6	6
28	(Spain) F Verdasco	6^{5}	1
17	(Germany) F Mayer	7^{7}	6
Q	(United States) K Kim	2	4
6	(Spain) T Robredo	6	6

Third round
LL	(Colombia) A Falla	3	2
24	(Czech Republic) R Štěpánek	6	6
17	(Germany) F Mayer	4	4
6	(Spain) T Robredo	6	6

Fourth round
24	(Czech Republic) R Štěpánek	6^{4}	7	6^{3}
6	(Spain) T Robredo	7^{7}	5	7^{7}

==== Section 3 ====
First round
(Thailand) D Udomchoke	7^{7}	2	3
(Germany) S Greul	6^{2}	6	6
Q	(United States) A Delić	6	6
(France) J Benneteau	4	4
(Serbia) J Tipsarević	7	7
Q	(Italy) A Seppi	5	5
(Spain) A Montañés	4	1
(France) A Clément	6	6

Second round
4	(Russia) N Davydenko	6	6
(Germany) S Greul	4	0
Q	(United States) A Delić	6	6
31	(Argentina) J Acasuso	0	3
23	(Argentina) J I Chela	6	6
(Serbia) J Tipsarević	2	2
(France) A Clément	4	1
14	(Czech Republic) T Berdych	6	6

Third round
4	(Russia) N Davydenko	6^{5}	3
Q	(United States) A Delić	7^{7}	6
23	(Argentina) J I Chela	6	7^{8}
14	(Czech Republic) T Berdych	4	6^{6}

Fourth round
Q	(United States) A Delić	3	2
23	(Argentina) J I Chela	6	6

==== Section 4 ====
First round
(United States) R Ginepri	1	3
(United States) V Spadea	6	6
LL	(Russia) E Korolev	6	6
(France) M Gicquel	4	2
(Belgium) C Rochus	7	5	2
(France) F Santoro	5	7	6
(France) N Mahut	3	r
(Italy) F Volandri	6

Second round
11	(Argentina) D Nalbandian	6	6
(United States) V Spadea	3	4
LL	(Russia) E Korolev	0	0
20	(Finland) J Nieminen	6	6
27	(Spain) C Moyà	6^{5}	2
(France) F Santoro	7^{7}	6
(Italy) F Volandri	3	2
7	(Croatia) I Ljubičić	6	6

Third round
11	(Argentina) D Nalbandian	4	6^{3}
20	(Finland) J Nieminen	6	7^{7}
(France) F Santoro	6	3	4
7	(Croatia) I Ljubičić	3	6	6

Fourth round
20	(Finland) J Nieminen	6^{4}	4
7	(Croatia) I Ljubičić	7^{7}	6

=== Bottom half ===
==== Section 5 ====
First round
WC	(Sweden) T Johansson	6	6
(Spain) A Martín	4	3
(Belgium) K Vliegen	1	1
(France) P-H Mathieu	6	6
WC	(Brazil) G Kuerten	2	2
Q	(Netherlands) R Sluiter	6	6
(United States) P Goldstein	6	2	6
WC	(United States) R Sweeting	2	6	3

Second round
5	(Chile) F González	7	6
WC	(Sweden) T Johansson	5	3
(France) P-H Mathieu	6	7
26	(Austria) J Melzer	0	5
LL	(United States) R Kendrick	6	6
Q	(Netherlands) R Sluiter	4	4
(United States) P Goldstein	2	6^{4}
12	(United Kingdom) A Murray	6	7^{7}

Third round
5	(Chile) F González	3	6^{6}
(France) P-H Mathieu	6	7^{8}
LL	(United States) R Kendrick	3	1
12	(United Kingdom) A Murray	6	6

Fourth round
(France) P-H Mathieu	6	5	3
12	(United Kingdom) A Murray	2	7	6

==== Section 6 ====
First round
(Argentina) J Mónaco	6	6
Q	(Netherlands) R Haase	4	4
Q	(Italy) S Bolelli	6	6
(France) G Monfils	4	2
(Thailand) P Srichaphan	2^{r}
(Peru) L Horna	5
(Argentina) M Vassallo Argüello	6	6
(South Korea) H-T Lee	4	2

Second round
13	(Spain) D Ferrer	6	6
(Argentina) J Mónaco	2	2
Q	(Italy) S Bolelli	6^{0}	6	6
21	(Russia) D Tursunov	7^{7}	3	4
32	(France) G Simon	6	7^{7}
(Peru) L Horna	3	6^{4}
(Argentina) M Vassallo Argüello	3	2
3	(United States) A Roddick	6	6

Third round
13	(Spain) D Ferrer	7^{7}	6
Q	(Italy) S Bolelli	6^{0}	2
32	(France) G Simon	4	4
3	(United States) A Roddick	6	6

Fourth round
13	(Spain) D Ferrer	5	3
3	(United States) A Roddick	7	6

==== Section 7 ====
First round
Q	(Australia) C Guccione	7^{8}	6^{8}	4
(France) F Serra	6^{6}	7^{10}	6
(Chile) N Massú	3	3
Q	(Spain) F López	6	6
(Austria) S Koubek	4	0
(France) M Llodra	6	6
(Belarus) M Mirnyi	6^{2}	4
(Italy) D Bracciali	7^{7}	6

Second round
8	(United States) J Blake	6^{8}	6	3
(France) F Serra	7^{10}	2	6
Q	(Spain) F López	7	7^{7}
25	(Russia) M Safin	5	6^{2}
22	(Slovakia) D Hrbatý	3	2
(France) M Llodra	6	6
(Italy) D Bracciali	6^{4}	4
10	(Serbia) N Djokovic	7^{7}	6

Third round
(France) F Serra	6^{4}	3
Q	(Spain) F López	7^{7}	6
(France) M Llodra	4	1
10	(Serbia) N Djokovic	6	6

Fourth round
Q	(Spain) F López	0	3
10	(Serbia) N Djokovic	6	6

==== Section 8 ====
First round
(Czech Republic) J Hájek	5	6	5
Q	(Russia) T Gabashvili	7	4	7
(Argentina) J M del Potro	7	6
(Sweden) J Björkman	5	1
Q	(Croatia) I Karlović	4	7^{7}	6^{5}
(Spain) G García López	6	6^{4}	7^{7}
(Czech Republic) J Hernych	1	6^{3}
Q	(Brazil) R Mello	6	7^{7}

Second round
16	(Russia) M Youzhny	3	6	6
Q	(Russia) T Gabashvili	6	3	3
(Argentina) J M del Potro	6	5	6
17	(Cyprus) M Baghdatis	2	7	0
30	(Belgium) O Rochus	6	6
(Spain) G García López	3	4
Q	(Brazil) R Mello	6^{7}	2
2	(Spain) R Nadal	7^{9}	6

Third round
16	(Russia) M Youzhny	6^{2}	4
(Argentina) J M del Potro	7^{7}	6
30	(Belgium) O Rochus
2	(Spain) R Nadal	w/o

Fourth round
(Argentina) J M del Potro	0	4
2	(Spain) R Nadal	6	6
