= 2007 Sony Ericsson Open – Men's doubles =

Men's doubles
- 2007 Sony Ericsson Open

Final
- Champion: (United States) Bob Bryan (United States) Mike Bryan
- Runner-up: (Czech Republic) Martin Damm (India) Leander Paes
- Score: 6–7^{(7–9)}, 6–3, [10–7]

Events
Singles	men	women
Doubles	men	women
← 2006 ·	Sony Ericsson Open	· 2008 →

Jonas Björkman and Max Mirnyi were the defending champions, but lost in the quarterfinals this year.

Bob Bryan and Mike Bryan won the title, defeating Martin Damm and Leander Paes 6–7^{(7–9)}, 6–3, [10–7] in the final.

== Seeds ==
1. (Sweden) Jonas Björkman / (Belarus) Max Mirnyi (quarterfinals)
2. (United States) Bob Bryan / (United States) Mike Bryan (champions)
3. (The Bahamas) Mark Knowles / (Canada) Daniel Nestor (quarterfinals)
4. (Australia) Paul Hanley / (Zimbabwe) Kevin Ullyett (quarterfinals)
5. (France) Fabrice Santoro / (Serbia) Nenad Zimonjić (semifinal)
6. (Czech Republic) Martin Damm / (India) Leander Paes (final)
7. (Israel) Jonathan Erlich / (Israel) Andy Ram (first round)
8. (Czech Republic) Lukáš Dlouhý / (Czech Republic) Pavel Vízner (first round)

== Draw ==
Key

- Q = Qualifier
- WC = Wild card
- LL = Lucky loser
- Alt = Alternate
- ITF = ITF entry
- PR = Protected ranking
- SR = Special ranking
- SE = Special exempt
- JE = Junior exempt
- JR = Junior Accelerator Programme entrant
- CO = College Accelerator Programme entrant
- NG = Next Gen Accelerator Program entrant
- w/o = Walkover
- r = Retired
- d = Defaulted

=== Final ===
Semifinals
6	(Czech Republic) Martin Damm (India) Leander Paes	6	3	[12]
(France) Arnaud Clément (France) Michaël Llodra	4	6	[10]
5	(France) Fabrice Santoro (Serbia) Nenad Zimonjić	5	2
2	(United States) Bob Bryan (United States) Mike Bryan	7	6

Final
6	(Czech Republic) Martin Damm (India) Leander Paes	7^{9}	3	[7]
2	(United States) Bob Bryan (United States) Mike Bryan	6^{7}	6	[10]

=== Section 1 ===
First round
1	(Sweden) J Björkman (Belarus) M Mirnyi	7	6
(United States) E Butorac (United Kingdom) J Murray	5	0
(India) M Bhupathi (Czech Republic) R Štěpánek	3	6	[8]
(Czech Republic) F Čermák (Czech Republic) J Levinský	6	2	[10]
(Germany) B Becker (Netherlands) R Wassen	6^{2}	0
(Austria) J Knowle (Austria) J Melzer	7^{7}	6
(Spain) D Ferrer (Spain) T Robredo	6^{5}	4
6	(Czech Republic) M Damm (India) L Paes	7^{7}	6
3	(The Bahamas) M Knowles (Canada) D Nestor	6	6
(Australia) A Fisher (South Africa) C Haggard	3	4
(South Africa) J Coetzee (Slovakia) D Hrbatý	6	7^{7}
WC	(Brazil) G Kuerten (Japan) K Nishikori	2	6^{5}
(France) A Clément (France) M Llodra	6	4	[10]
(Spain) N Almagro (Spain) F Verdasco	1	6	[3]
WC	(United States) B Evans (United States) R Sweeting	6	6
8	(Czech Republic) L Dlouhý (Czech Republic) P Vízner	1	3

Second round
1	(Sweden) J Björkman (Belarus) M Mirnyi	6	7^{7}
(Czech Republic) F Čermák (Czech Republic) J Levinský	3	6^{4}
(Austria) J Knowle (Austria) J Melzer	4	7^{7}	[8]
6	(Czech Republic) M Damm (India) L Paes	6	6^{1}	[10]
3	(The Bahamas) M Knowles (Canada) D Nestor	0	6	[11]
(South Africa) J Coetzee (Slovakia) D Hrbatý	6	4	[9]
(France) A Clément (France) M Llodra	6	7^{12}
WC	(United States) B Evans (United States) R Sweeting	3	6^{10}

Quarterfinals
2	(Sweden) J Björkman (Belarus) M Mirnyi	6^{5}	3
6	(Czech Republic) M Damm (India) L Paes	7^{7}	6
3	(The Bahamas) M Knowles (Canada) D Nestor	6	1	[5]
(France) A Clément (France) M Llodra	3	6	[10]

Semifinals
6	(Czech Republic) M Damm (India) L Paes	6	3	[12]
(France) A Clément (France) M Llodra	4	6	[10]

=== Section 2 ===
First round
5	(France) F Santoro (Serbia) N Zimonjić	6	6
(Poland) M Fyrstenberg (Poland) M Matkowski	2	4
(Czech Republic) D Škoch (United States) J Thomas	6	6
(Sweden) R Lindstedt (Finland) J Nieminen	1	4
(Argentina) M García (Argentina) S Prieto	5	3
(United States) P Goldstein (United States) S Querrey	7	6
(Switzerland) Y Allegro (United Kingdom) T Henman	4	4
4	(Australia) P Hanley (Zimbabwe) K Ullyett	6	6
7	(Israel) J Erlich (Israel) A Ram	4	4
(Sweden) S Aspelin (Germany) M Kohlmann	6	6
(Romania) A Pavel (Germany) A Waske	6	6
(Czech Republic) L Friedl (Czech Republic) P Pála	3	3
Alt	(Germany) B Dorsch (Romania) H Tecău	7	4	[5]
(Czech Republic) T Berdych (Croatia) I Ljubičić	6	6	[10]
Alt	(Russia) E Korolev (Ecuador) LF Manrique	1	2
2	(United States) B Bryan (United States) M Bryan	6	6

Second round
5	(France) F Santoro (Serbia) N Zimonjić	7^{9}	7^{8}
(Czech Republic) D Škoch (United States) J Thomas	6^{7}	6^{6}
(United States) P Goldstein (United States) S Querrey	1	6	[11]
4	(Australia) P Hanley (Zimbabwe) K Ullyett	6	4	[13]
(Sweden) S Aspelin (Germany) M Kohlmann	4	6^{2}
(Romania) A Pavel (Germany) A Waske	6	7^{7}
(Czech Republic) T Berdych (Croatia) I Ljubičić	2	2
2	(United States) B Bryan (United States) M Bryan	6	6

Quarterfinals
5	(France) F Santoro (Serbia) N Zimonjić	4	6	[12]
4	(Australia) P Hanley (Zimbabwe) K Ullyett	6	3	[10]
(Romania) A Pavel (Germany) A Waske	6^{4}	7^{8}	[8]
2	(United States) B Bryan (United States) M Bryan	7^{7}	6^{6}	[10]

Semifinals
5	(France) F Santoro (Serbia) N Zimonjić	5	2
2	(United States) B Bryan (United States) M Bryan	7	6
