= 2006 Western & Southern Financial Group Women's Open – Doubles =

Doubles
- 2006 Western & Southern Financial Group Women's Open

Final
- Champions: (Italy) Maria Elena Camerin (Argentina) Gisela Dulko
- Runners-up: (Poland) Marta Domachowska (India) Sania Mirza
- Score: 6–4, 3–6, 6–2

Details
- Draw: 15
- Seeds: 4

Events
Singles	Doubles
← 2005 ·	Western & Southern Financial Group Women's Open	· 2007 →

Laura Granville and Abigail Spears were the defending champions, but had different outcomes. While Granville did not compete this year, Spears partnered with Carly Gullickson and lost in first round to Chan Chin-wei and Tetiana Luzhanska.

Maria Elena Camerin and Gisela Dulko won the title, defeating Marta Domachowska and Sania Mirza 6–4, 3–6, 6–2 in the final. It was the 3rd and final title for Camerin and the 6th title for Dulko, in their respective careers.

== Seeds ==
1. (Italy) Maria Elena Camerin / (Argentina) Gisela Dulko (champions)
2. (United States) ~~Bethanie Mattek~~ / (United States) ~~Mashona Washington~~ (withdrew due to a left knee injury on Washington)
3. (Poland) Marta Domachowska / (India) Sania Mirza (final)
4. (United States) Carly Gullickson / (United States) Abigail Spears (first round)
5. (Finland) Emma Laine / (Czech Republic) Hana Šromová (semifinals)

== Draw ==
=== Key ===
- Q = Qualifier
- WC = Wild card
- LL = Lucky loser
- Alt = Alternate
- ITF = ITF entry
- PR = Protected ranking
- SR = Special ranking
- SE = Special exempt
- JE = Junior exempt
- JR = Junior Accelerator Programme entrant
- CO = College Accelerator Programme entrant
- NG = Next Gen Accelerator Program entrant
- w/o = Walkover
- r = Retired
- d = Defaulted

First round
1	(Italy) MC Camerin (Argentina) G Dulko	0	6	6
(Canada) M Drake (India) S Uberoi	6	1	3
(Paraguay) R de los Ríos (Serbia and Montenegro) J Janković	6	6
WC	(United States) Angela Farley-Wilson (United States) Keri Preng	2	0
5	(Finland) E Laine (Czech Republic) H Šromová	6	6
(United States) S Fonseca (United States) T Snyder	3	1
(United States) J Kirkland (United States) L Osterloh	2	3
(Uzbekistan) A Amanmuradova (Ukraine) O Savchuk	6	6
(Chinese Taipei) C-w Chan (Ukraine) T Luzhanska	6	6
4	(United States) C Gullickson (United States) A Spears	4	3
(Russia) V Bardina (Georgia (country)) S Devidze	3	6	1
(Uzbekistan) V Lepchenko (China) M Yuan	6	3	6
(South Africa) N Grandin (Venezuela) M Sequera	4	3
3	(Poland) M Domachowska (India) S Mirza	6	6

Quarterfinals
1	(Italy) MC Camerin (Argentina) G Dulko	6	6
(Paraguay) R de los Ríos (Serbia and Montenegro) J Janković	4	4
5	(Finland) E Laine (Czech Republic) H Šromová	3	6	6
(Uzbekistan) A Amanmuradova (Ukraine) O Savchuk	6	3	3
(United Kingdom) A Keothavong (Russia) A Kudryavtseva	2	3
(Chinese Taipei) C-w Chan (Ukraine) T Luzhanska	6	6
(Uzbekistan) V Lepchenko (China) M Yuan	4	7	6^{3}
3	(Poland) M Domachowska (India) S Mirza	6	5	7^{7}

Semifinals
1	(Italy) MC Camerin (Argentina) G Dulko	6	6
5	(Finland) E Laine (Czech Republic) H Šromová	2	2
(Chinese Taipei) C-w Chan (Ukraine) T Luzhanska	0	1
3	(Poland) M Domachowska (India) S Mirza	6	6

Final
1	(Italy) MC Camerin (Argentina) G Dulko	6	3	6
3	(Poland) M Domachowska (India) S Mirza	4	6	2
