= 2007 Western & Southern Financial Group Masters and Women's Open =

2007 Western & Southern Financial Group Masters and Western & Southern Financial Group Women's Open
- Date: August 11–19 (men); July 14–22 (women)
- Edition: 106th
- Surface: Hard / Outdoor
- Location: Mason, United States
- Venue: Lindner Family Tennis Center

Champions

Men's singles
- (Switzerland) Roger Federer

Women's singles
- (Russia) Anna Chakvetadze

Men's doubles
- (Israel) Jonathan Erlich / (Israel) Andy Ram

Women's doubles
- (United States) Bethanie Mattek / (India) Sania Mirza
- Western & Southern Financial Group Masters Western & Southern Financial Group Women's Open

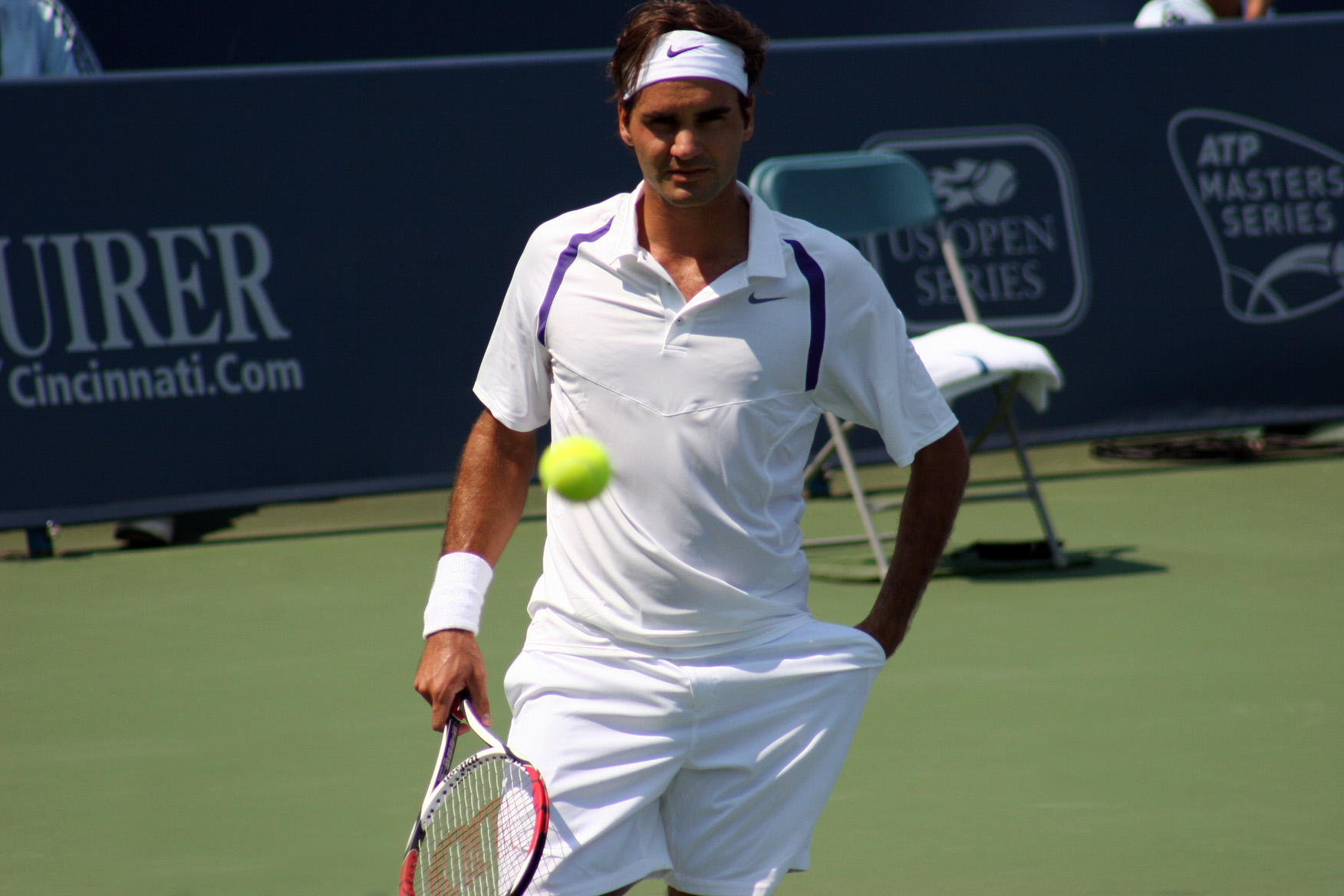
Men's singles champion Roger Federer

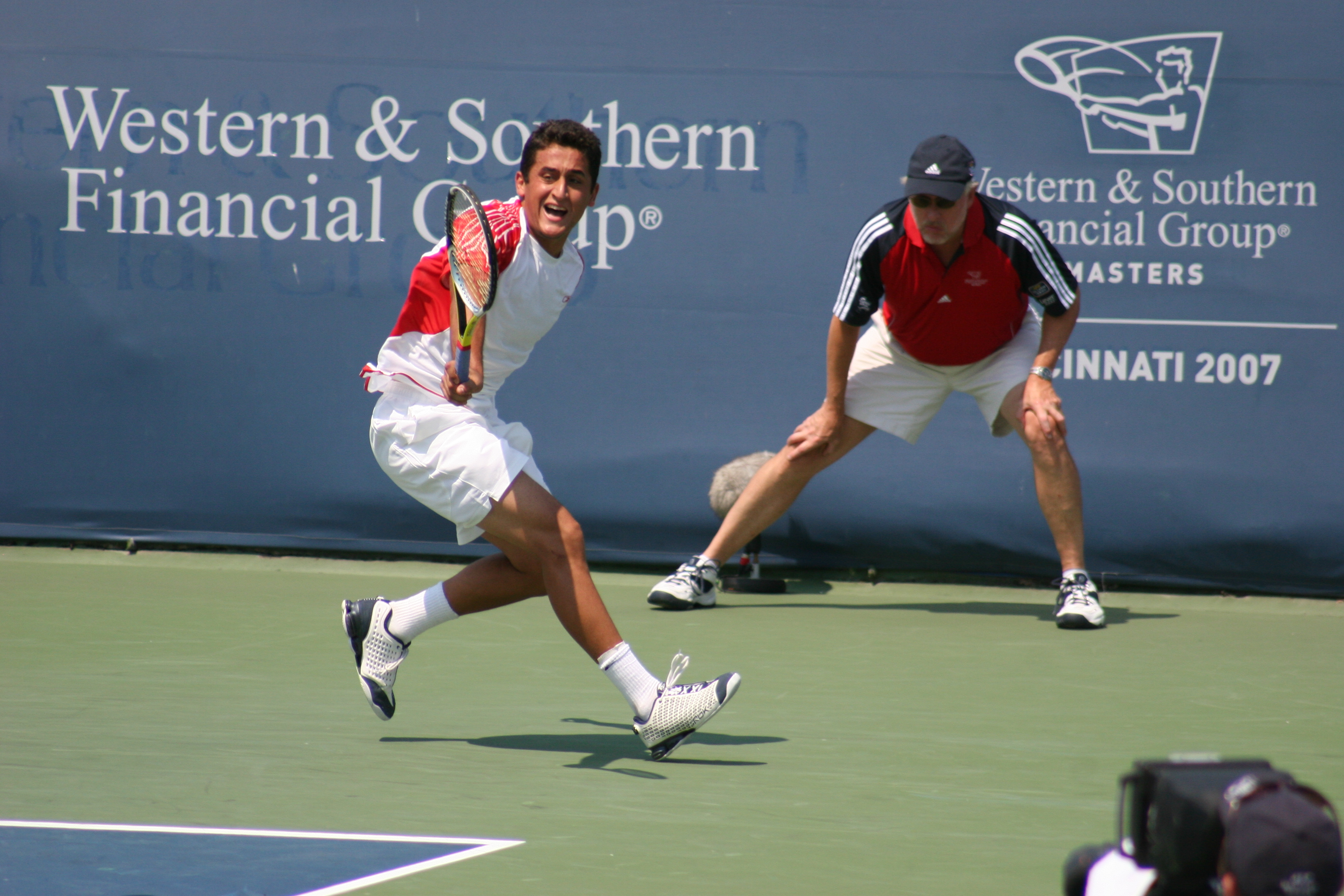
Men's singles quarterfinalist Nicolás Almagro

The 2007 Cincinnati Masters (also known as the Western & Southern Financial Group Masters and Western & Southern Financial Group Women's Open for sponsorship reasons) was a tennis tournament played on outdoor hard courts. It was the 106th edition of the Cincinnati Masters, and was part of the ATP Masters Series of the 2007 ATP Tour, and of the Tier III Series of the 2007 WTA Tour. Both the men's and the women's events took place at the Lindner Family Tennis Center in Mason, near Cincinnati, Ohio, United States, with the men playing from August 11 through August 19, 2007, and the women from July 14 through July 22, 2007.

The men's singles were led by World No. 1, Australian Open and Wimbledon champion, and Canada Masters runner-up Roger Federer, French Open winner and Stuttgart titlist Rafael Nadal, and new ATP No. 3, Miami and Canada Masters champion Novak Djokovic. Other players competing were Washington champion Andy Roddick, Roland-Garros semifinalist Nikolay Davydenko, Fernando González, Tommy Robredo and Richard Gasquet.

The announced women's draw was headlined by WTA No. 8, French Open quarterfinalist and 's-Hertogenbosch champion Anna Chakvetadze, Gold Coast runner-up Patty Schnyder, and Fes doubles titlist Sania Mirza. Other top seeds competing in the field Birmingham doubles finalist Meilen Tu, Tokyo finalist Aiko Nakamura, Elena Vesnina, Akiko Morigami and Séverine Brémond.

== Finals ==
=== Men's singles ===
(Switzerland) Roger Federer defeated (United States) James Blake 6–1, 6–4

- It was Roger Federer's 5th title of the year, and his 50th overall. It was his 2nd Masters title of the year, his 14th overall, and his 2nd win at the event.

=== Women's singles ===
(Russia) Anna Chakvetadze defeated (Japan) Akiko Morigami 6–1, 6–3

- It was Anna Chakvetadze's 3rd title of the year, and her 5th overall.

=== Men's doubles ===
(Israel) Jonathan Erlich / (Israel) Andy Ram defeated (United States) Bob Bryan / (United States) Mike Bryan 4–6, 6–3, [13–11]

=== Women's doubles ===
(United States) Bethanie Mattek / (India) Sania Mirza defeated (Russia) Alina Jidkova / (Belarus) Tatiana Poutchek 7–6^{(7–4)}, 7–5
