= 2005 Western & Southern Financial Group Masters =

2005 Western & Southern Financial Group Masters and Western & Southern Financial Group Women's Open
- Date: August 15 – August 22 (men); July 18 – July 24 (women)
- Edition: 104th
- Surface: Hard / Outdoor
- Location: Mason, United States
- Venue: Lindner Family Tennis Center

Champions

Men's singles
- (Switzerland) Roger Federer

Women's singles
- (Switzerland) Patty Schnyder

Men's doubles
- (Sweden) Jonas Björkman / (Belarus) Max Mirnyi

Women's doubles
- (United States) Laura Granville / (United States) Abigail Spears
- Western & Southern Financial Group Masters Western & Southern Financial Group Women's Open

The 2005 Cincinnati Masters (also known as the Western & Southern Financial Group Masters and Western & Southern Financial Group Women's Open for sponsorship reasons) was a tennis tournament played on outdoor hard courts. It was the 104th edition of the Cincinnati Masters, and was part of the ATP Masters Series of the 2005 ATP Tour, and of the Tier III Series of the 2005 WTA Tour. Both the men's and the women's events took place at the Lindner Family Tennis Center in Mason, near Cincinnati, Ohio, United States, with the men playing from August 15 through August 22, 2005, and the women from August 23 through August 30, 2005.

The men's field was led by World No. 1 Roger Federer. Other top seeded players were Rafael Nadal, Lleyton Hewitt, Marat Safin, and home favorite Andy Roddick.

The women's draw featured Patty Schnyder and Vera Zvonareva. Also competing were Jelena Janković, Daniela Hantuchová, and Marion Bartoli.

== Finals ==
=== Men's singles ===
(Switzerland) Roger Federer defeated (United States) Andy Roddick, 6–3, 7–5

- It was Roger Federer's 9th title of the year, and his 31st overall. It was his 4th Masters title of the year and his 8th overall.

=== Women's singles ===
(Switzerland) Patty Schnyder defeated (Japan) Akiko Morigami 6–4, 6–0

- It was Patty Schnyder's 2nd title of the year and her 10th overall.

=== Men's doubles ===
(Sweden) Jonas Björkman / (Belarus) Max Mirnyi defeated (Zimbabwe) Wayne Black / (Zimbabwe) Kevin Ullyett, 6–4, 5–7, 6–2

=== Women's doubles ===
(United States) Laura Granville / (United States) Abigail Spears defeated (Czech Republic) Květa Peschke / (Argentina) María Emilia Salerni 3–6, 6–2, 6–4
