= 2004 Western & Southern Financial Group Masters – Singles =

Singles
- 2004 Western & Southern Financial Group Masters

Final
- Champion: (United States) Andre Agassi
- Runner-up: (Australia) Lleyton Hewitt
- Score: 6–3, 3–6, 6–2

Details
- Draw: 64
- Seeds: 16

Events
Singles	Doubles
← 2003 ·	Western & Southern Financial Group Masters	· 2005 →

Andre Agassi defeated Lleyton Hewitt in the final, 6–3, 3–6, 6–2 to win the men's singles tennis title at the 2004 Cincinnati Masters.

Andy Roddick was the defending champion, but lost in the semifinals to Agassi.

== Seeds ==
1. (Switzerland) Roger Federer (first round)
2. (United States) Andy Roddick (semifinals)
3. (Argentina) ~~Guillermo Coria~~ (withdrew due to a right shoulder injury)
4. (Spain) Carlos Moyà (quarterfinals)
5. (United Kingdom) Tim Henman (third round)
6. (Argentina) ~~David Nalbandian~~ (withdrew due to an elbow injury)
7. (Spain) Juan Carlos Ferrero (second round)
8. (Germany) Rainer Schüttler (first round)
9. (Argentina) Gastón Gaudio (second round)
10. (Australia) Lleyton Hewitt (final)
11. (United States) Andre Agassi (champion)
12. (France) Sébastien Grosjean (first round)
13. (Chile) Nicolás Massú (first round)
14. (Russia) Marat Safin (quarterfinals)
15. (Thailand) Paradorn Srichaphan (third round)
16. (Romania) Andrei Pavel (first round)
17. (Argentina) Juan Ignacio Chela (third round)

== Draw ==
=== Key ===
- Q = Qualifier
- WC = Wild card
- LL = Lucky loser
- Alt = Alternate
- ITF = ITF entry
- PR = Protected ranking
- SR = Special ranking
- SE = Special exempt
- JE = Junior exempt
- JR = Junior Accelerator Programme entrant
- CO = College Accelerator Programme entrant
- NG = Next Gen Accelerator Program entrant
- w/o = Walkover
- r = Retired
- d = Defaulted

=== Finals ===
Quarterfinals
(France) Fabrice Santoro	2	3
(Spain) Tommy Robredo	6	6
14	(Russia) Marat Safin	4	4
10	(Australia) Lleyton Hewitt	6	6
11	(United States) Andre Agassi	7^{14}	6
4	(Spain) Carlos Moyá	6^{12}	3
WC	(Germany) Tommy Haas	3	3
2	(United States) Andy Roddick	6	6

Semifinals
(Spain) Tommy Robredo	3	2
10	(Australia) Lleyton Hewitt	6	6
11	(United States) Andre Agassi	7	6^{2}	7^{7}
2	(United States) Andy Roddick	5	7^{7}	6^{2}

Final
10	(Australia) Lleyton Hewitt	3	6	2
11	(United States) Andre Agassi	6	3	6

=== Top half ===
==== Section 1 ====
First round
1	(Switzerland) R Federer	6	6^{7}	4
(Slovakia) D Hrbatý	1	7^{9}	6
(Sweden) J Björkman	2	6	6
(Georgia (country)) I Labadze	6	2	1
(United States) R Ginepri	3	6^{6}
(France) F Santoro	6	7^{8}
(Russia) M Youzhny	6	3	6
13	(Chile) N Massú	3	6	3
9	(Argentina) G Gaudio	6	6
WC	(United States) J-M Gambill	4	2
(Sweden) T Enqvist	6	3	2
Q	(United Kingdom) G Rusedski	3	6	6
(United States) T Dent	6^{4}	3
(Spain) T Robredo	7^{7}	6
(France) A Clément	4	4
7	(Spain) J C Ferrero	6	6

Second round
(Slovakia) D Hrbatý	7^{8}	3	3
(Sweden) J Björkman	6^{6}	6	6
(France) F Santoro	7	6
(Russia) M Youzhny	5	3
9	(Argentina) G Gaudio	6	6^{3}	4
Q	(United Kingdom) G Rusedski	4	7^{7}	6
(Spain) T Robredo	7^{7}	4	6
7	(Spain) J C Ferrero	6^{5}	6	4

Third round
(Sweden) J Björkman	0	3
(France) F Santoro	6	6
Q	(United Kingdom) G Rusedski	6^{4}	6^{2}
(Spain) T Robredo	7^{7}	7^{7}

Quarterfinals
(France) F Santoro	2	3
(Spain) T Robredo	6	6

==== Section 2 ====
First round
LL	(Australia) T Reid	4	4
(Spain) F López	6	6
Q	(South Africa) W Moodie	7^{7}	6^{7}	6^{9}
Q	(Croatia) I Karlović	6^{2}	7^{9}	7^{11}
(Austria) J Melzer	6^{3}	2
WC	(United States) J Morrison	7^{7}	6
(Czech Republic) J Novák	3	0
14	(Russia) M Safin	6	6
10	(Australia) L Hewitt	6	6
WC	(United States) A Bogomolov Jr.	2	4
(Chinese Taipei) Y-H Lu	4	6	3
(Brazil) G Kuerten	6	3	6
(Morocco) H Arazi	6^{3}	7	5
(United States) V Spadea	7^{7}	5	3^{r}
(Morocco) Y El Aynaoui	1	0
5	(United Kingdom) T Henman	6	6

Second round
(Spain) F López	6^{9}	4
Q	(Croatia) I Karlović	7^{11}	6
WC	(United States) J Morrison	4	4
14	(Russia) M Safin	6	6
10	(Australia) L Hewitt	6	6
(Brazil) G Kuerten	3	4
(Morocco) H Arazi	6	3	5
5	(United Kingdom) T Henman	4	6	7

Third round
Q	(Croatia) I Karlović	6^{4}	7^{7}	4
14	(Russia) M Safin	7^{7}	6^{3}	6
10	(Australia) L Hewitt	6	6
5	(United Kingdom) T Henman	1	4

Quarterfinals
14	(Russia) M Safin	4	4
10	(Australia) L Hewitt	6	6

=== Bottom half ===
==== Section 3 ====
First round
17	(Argentina) J I Chela	6	4	7^{7}
(Spain) R Nadal	4	6	6^{3}
(Chile) F González	6	6
Q	(Russia) D Tursunov	4	4
SE	(Sweden) T Johansson	7^{7}	7^{7}
LL	(France) G Carraz	6^{3}	6^{3}
(United States) M Fish	6	6^{3}	1
11	(United States) A Agassi	4	7^{7}	6
16	(Romania) A Pavel	6^{5}	3
LL	(Australia) W Arthurs	7^{7}	6
(France) M Llodra	4	6^{1}
(Argentina) M Zabaleta	6	7^{7}
(Belgium) X Malisse	6	6^{5}	6^{5}
(Croatia) I Ljubičić	4	7^{7}	7^{7}
Q	(United Kingdom) A Parmar	6	5	2
4	(Spain) C Moyà	3	7	6

Second round
17	(Argentina) J I Chela	2	6	6
(Chile) F González	6	3	2
SE	(Sweden) T Johansson	1	6	1
11	(United States) A Agassi	6	3	6
LL	(Australia) W Arthurs	6	7^{8}
(Argentina) M Zabaleta	2	6^{6}
(Croatia) I Ljubičić	4	6	4
4	(Spain) C Moyà	6	4	6

Third round
17	(Argentina) J I Chela	3	3
11	(United States) A Agassi	6	6
LL	(Australia) W Arthurs	6^{5}	6	6^{5}
4	(Spain) C Moyà	7^{7}	4	7^{7}

Quarterfinals
11	(United States) A Agassi	7^{14}	6
4	(Spain) C Moyà	6^{12}	3

==== Section 4 ====
First round
8	(Germany) R Schüttler	3	6	4
WC	(Germany) T Haas	6	1	6
(Armenia) S Sargsian	2	6	7
Q	(Switzerland) M Kratochvil	6	2	5
(Peru) L Horna	7^{7}	7^{7}
(Spain) F Verdasco	6^{4}	6^{3}
(Sweden) R Söderling	3	6	6
12	(France) S Grosjean	6	3	4
15	(Thailand) P Srichaphan	6	5	6
(Spain) D Ferrer	3	7	3
Q	(Belgium) D Norman	4	3
(Netherlands) S Schalken	6	6
(Sweden) J Johansson	3	6^{2}
(Germany) N Kiefer	6	7^{7}
(Belarus) M Mirnyi	7^{7}	6^{5}	3
2	(United States) A Roddick	6^{5}	7^{7}	6

Second round
WC	(Germany) T Haas	6	6
(Armenia) S Sargsian	3	3
(Peru) L Horna	2	3
(Sweden) R Söderling	6	6
15	(Thailand) P Srichaphan	6	6
(Netherlands) S Schalken	3	4
(Germany) N Kiefer	4	4
2	(United States) A Roddick	6	6

Third round
WC	(Germany) T Haas	6	5	6
(Sweden) R Söderling	3	7	4
15	(Thailand) P Srichaphan	2	3
2	(United States) A Roddick	6	6

Quarterfinals
WC	(Germany) T Haas	3	3
2	(United States) A Roddick	6	6
