= 2005 Western & Southern Financial Group Women's Open – Doubles =

Doubles
- 2005 Western & Southern Financial Group Women's Open

Final
- Champions: (United States) Laura Granville (United States) Abigail Spears
- Runners-up: (Czech Republic) Květa Peschke (Argentina) María Emilia Salerni
- Score: 3–6, 6–2, 6–4

Details
- Draw: 16
- Seeds: 4

Events
Singles	Doubles
← 2004 ·	Western & Southern Financial Group Women's Open	· 2006 →

Jill Craybas and Marlene Weingärtner were the defending champions, but did not compete this year. Weingärtner would eventually retire from professional tennis at the 2005 US Open.

Laura Granville and Abigail Spears won the title, defeating Květa Peschke and María Emilia Salerni 3–6, 6–2, 6–4 in the final. It was the 1st title for Granville and the 3rd title for Spears, in their respective careers.

== Seeds ==
1. (Czech Republic) Květa Peschke / (Argentina) María Emilia Salerni (final)
2. (Czech Republic) Iveta Benešová / (United States) Meilen Tu (semifinals)
3. (United States) Laura Granville / (United States) Abigail Spears (champions)
4. (Russia) Alina Jidkova / (Israel) Shahar Pe'er (first round)

== Draw ==
=== Key ===
- Q = Qualifier
- WC = Wild card
- LL = Lucky loser
- Alt = Alternate
- SE = Special exempt
- PR = Protected ranking
- ITF = ITF entry
- JE = Junior exempt
- w/o = Walkover
- r = Retired
- d = Defaulted
- SR = Special ranking

=== Draw ===
First round
1	(Czech Republic) K Peschke (Argentina) ME Salerni	6	6
WC	(United States) L Osterloh (United States) Kelly Story	1	1
(Canada) M Drake (Netherlands) S Noorlander	6	5	7^{7}
(Japan) R Fuda (Japan) S Okamoto	1	7	6^{4}
4	(Russia) A Jidkova (Israel) S Pe'er	7	1	1
(United States) A Haynes (United States) B Mattek	5	6	6
(Ukraine) Y Fedak (India) S Mirza	5	6	6
Q	(Austria) S Bammer (United States) J Peterson	7	2	0
(South Korea) Y-j Cho (Japan) A Nakamura	7^{7}	6
(Republic of Ireland) K Liggan (Russia) T Panova	6^{4}	1
(Latvia) L Dekmeijere (United States) J Ditty	3	6	2
3	(United States) L Granville (United States) A Spears	6	1	6
(France) S Beltrame (France) C Pin	6^{3}	2
(United States) CA Avants (United States) S Fonseca	7^{7}	6
(South Africa) K Grant (Serbia and Montenegro) J Janković	5	5
2	(Czech Republic) I Benešová (United States) M Tu	7	7

Quarterfinals
1	(Czech Republic) K Peschke (Argentina) ME Salerni	6	2	7
(Canada) M Drake (Netherlands) S Noorlander	1	6	5
(United States) A Haynes (United States) B Mattek	3	2
(Ukraine) Y Fedak (India) S Mirza	6	6
(South Korea) Y-j Cho (Japan) A Nakamura	5	1
3	(United States) L Granville (United States) A Spears	7	6
(United States) CA Avants (United States) S Fonseca	6	1	1
2	(Czech Republic) I Benešová (United States) M Tu	3	6	6

Semifinals
1	(Czech Republic) K Peschke (Argentina) ME Salerni	7	6
(Ukraine) Y Fedak (India) S Mirza	5	3
3	(United States) L Granville (United States) A Spears	6	7
2	(Czech Republic) I Benešová (United States) M Tu	3	5

Final
1	(Czech Republic) K Peschke (Argentina) ME Salerni	6	2	4
3	(United States) L Granville (United States) A Spears	3	6	6
