= 2007 Western & Southern Financial Group Women's Open – Doubles =

Doubles
- 2007 Western & Southern Financial Group Women's Open

Final
- Champions: (United States) Bethanie Mattek (India) Sania Mirza
- Runners-up: (Russia) Alina Jidkova (Belarus) Tatiana Poutchek
- Score: 7–6^{(7–4)}, 7–5

Details
- Draw: 16
- Seeds: 4

Events
Singles	Doubles
← 2006 ·	Western & Southern Financial Group Women's Open	· 2008 →

Maria Elena Camerin and Gisela Dulko were the defending champions, but chose not to participate that year.

Bethanie Mattek and Sania Mirza won in the final 7–6^{(7–4)}, 7–5, against Alina Jidkova and Tatiana Poutchek.

== Seeds ==
1. (United States) Bethanie Mattek / (India) Sania Mirza (champions)
2. (South Africa) Natalie Grandin / (France) Camille Pin (quarterfinals)
3. (Japan) Akiko Morigami / (Japan) Aiko Nakamura (semifinals)
4. (New Zealand) Leanne Baker / (Australia) Nicole Kriz (first round)

== Draw ==
=== Key ===
- Q = Qualifier
- WC = Wild card
- LL = Lucky loser
- Alt = Alternate
- SE = Special exempt
- PR = Protected ranking
- ITF = ITF entry
- JE = Junior exempt
- w/o = Walkover
- r = Retired
- d = Defaulted
- SR = Special ranking

First round
1	(United States) B Mattek (India) S Mirza	6	6
(Colombia) C Castaño (China) M Yuan	4	0
WC	(United States) K Flower (China) C-y Hsu	2	1
(United States) L Osterloh (Russia) A Rodionova	6	6
4	(New Zealand) L Baker (Australia) N Kriz	6^{3}	7	[8]
(Uzbekistan) A Amanmuradova (Uzbekistan) V Lepchenko	7	6^{4}	[10]
(Latvia) L Dekmeijere (Turkey) İ Şenoğlu	6	7
(United States) C Nagle (United States) R Stephenson	3	6^{4}
(Australia) M Adamczak (Romania) A Perianu	6	6
(Georgia (country)) S Devidze (Belarus) I Kuryanovich	1	4
(South Africa) C Scheepers (United States) A Spears	3	6	[9]
3	(Japan) A Morigami (Japan) A Nakamura	6	0	[11]
(Russia) A Jidkova (Belarus) T Poutchek	6	7
(United States) A Glatch (Belarus) O Govortsova	1	6^{4}
(Germany) A Bachmann (Hungary) M Czink	7	5	[12]
2	(South Africa) N Grandin (France) C Pin	6^{3}	7	[14]

Quarterfinals
1	(United States) B Mattek (India) S Mirza	6	6
(United States) L Osterloh (Russia) A Rodionova	2	3
(Uzbekistan) A Amanmuradova (Uzbekistan) V Lepchenko	5	4
(Latvia) L Dekmeijere (Turkey) İ Şenoğlu	7	6
(Australia) M Adamczak (Romania) A Perianu	7	3	[4]
3	(Japan) A Morigami (Japan) A Nakamura	6^{4}	6	[10]
(Russia) A Jidkova (Belarus) T Poutchek	7	6
2	(South Africa) N Grandin (France) C Pin	6^{2}	1

Semifinals
1	(United States) B Mattek (India) S Mirza	2	6	[10]
(Latvia) L Dekmeijere (Turkey) İ Şenoğlu	6	3	[3]
3	(Japan) A Morigami (Japan) A Nakamura	2	1
(Russia) A Jidkova (Belarus) T Poutchek	6	6

Final
1	(United States) B Mattek (India) S Mirza	7	7
(Russia) A Jidkova (Belarus) T Poutchek	6^{4}	5
