= 2007 Western & Southern Financial Group Masters – Doubles =

Doubles
- 2007 Western & Southern Financial Group Masters

Final
- Champions: (Israel) Jonathan Erlich (Israel) Andy Ram
- Runners-up: (United States) Bob Bryan (United States) Mike Bryan
- Score: 4–6, 6–3, [13–11]

Events
Singles	Doubles
← 2006 ·	Western & Southern Financial Group Masters	· 2008 →

Jonas Björkman and Max Mirnyi were the defending champions, but lost in the second round to Novak Djokovic and Nenad Zimonjić.

Jonathan Erlich and Andy Ram won in the final 4–6, 6–3, [13–11], against Bob Bryan and Mike Bryan.

== Seeds ==
All seeds received a bye into the second round.

1. (United States) Bob Bryan / (United States) Mike Bryan (final)
2. (Sweden) Jonas Björkman / (Belarus) Max Mirnyi (second round)
3. (The Bahamas) Mark Knowles / (Canada) Daniel Nestor (quarterfinals)
4. (Czech Republic) Martin Damm / (India) Leander Paes (semifinals)
5. (Australia) Paul Hanley / (Zimbabwe) Kevin Ullyett (quarterfinals, retired due to a back injury for Ullyett)
6. (Israel) Jonathan Erlich / (Israel) Andy Ram (champions)
7. (Czech Republic) Lukáš Dlouhý / (Czech Republic) Pavel Vízner (semifinals)
8. (Sweden) Simon Aspelin / (Australia) Julian Knowle (quarterfinals)

== Draw ==
=== Key ===
- Q = Qualifier
- WC = Wild card
- LL = Lucky loser
- Alt = Alternate
- ITF = ITF entry
- PR = Protected ranking
- SR = Special ranking
- SE = Special exempt
- JE = Junior exempt
- JR = Junior Accelerator Programme entrant
- CO = College Accelerator Programme entrant
- NG = Next Gen Accelerator Program entrant
- w/o = Walkover
- r = Retired
- d = Defaulted

=== Finals ===
Semifinals
1	(United States) Bob Bryan (United States) Mike Bryan	3	6	[10]
4	(Czech Republic) Martin Damm (India) Leander Paes	6	0	[7]
7	(Czech Republic) Lukáš Dlouhý (Czech Republic) Pavel Vízner	6^{4}	5
6	(Israel) Jonathan Erlich (Israel) Andy Ram	7^{7}	7

Final
1	(United States) Bob Bryan (United States) Mike Bryan	6	3	[11]
6	(Israel) Jonathan Erlich (Israel) Andy Ram	4	6	[13]

=== Top half ===
First round
(India) M Bhupathi (United Kingdom) J Murray	7^{7}	6^{5}	[10]
(Argentina) J Mónaco (Australia) T Perry	6^{1}	7^{7}	[3]
(Czech Republic) T Berdych (Germany) N Kiefer	6	7^{7}
(Chile) F González (Croatia) I Ljubičić	4	6^{2}
(Argentina) G Cañas (Argentina) M García	4	6	[7]
(France) J Benneteau (France) A Clément	6	4	[10]
(Romania) A Pavel (Germany) A Waske	6^{5}	5
WC	(United States) A Delić (United States) J Isner	7^{7}	7

Second round
1	(United States) B Bryan (United States) M Bryan	6	6
(India) M Bhupathi (United Kingdom) J Murray	3	2
(Czech Republic) T Berdych (Germany) N Kiefer	5	4
8	(Sweden) S Aspelin (Austria) J Knowle	7	6
4	(Czech Republic) M Damm (India) L Paes	6	7
(France) J Benneteau (France) A Clément	4	5
WC	(United States) A Delić (United States) J Isner	6^{5}	6	[9]
5	(Australia) Hanley (Zimbabwe) K Ullyett	7^{7}	3	[11]

Quarterfinals
1	(United States) B Bryan (United States) M Bryan	7^{7}	6
8	(Sweden) S Aspelin (Austria) J Knowle	6^{2}	4
4	(Czech Republic) M Damm (India) L Paes	5
5	(Australia) P Hanley (Zimbabwe) K Ullyett	3^{r}

Semifinals
1	(United States) B Bryan (United States) M Bryan	3	6	[10]
4	(Czech Republic) M Damm (India) L Paes	6	0	[7]

=== Bottom half ===
First round
ALT	(Slovakia) D Hrbatý (France) P-H Mathieu	6	2	[5]
(Russia) D Tursunov (Netherlands) R Wassen	4	6	[10]
(Czech Republic) F Čermák (Finland) J Nieminen	3	6	[5]
(Poland) M Fyrstenberg (Poland) M Matkowski	6	3	[10]
(Spain) N Almagro (Spain) D Ferrer	6	6
(Austria) J Melzer (Spain) T Robredo	3	3
WC	(United States) E Butorac (United States) S Querrey	3	4
(Serbia) N Djokovic (Serbia) N Zimonjić	6	6

Second round
7	(Czech Republic) L Dlouhý (Czech Republic) P Vízner	6	6
(Russia) D Tursunov (Netherlands) R Wassen	2	3
(Poland) M Fyrstenberg (Poland) M Matkowski	6^{10}	4
3	(The Bahamas) M Knowles (Canada) D Nestor	7^{12}	6
6	(Israel) J Erlich (Israel) A Ram	6	6
(Spain) N Almagro (Spain) D Ferrer	1	4
(Serbia) N Djokovic (Serbia) N Zimonjić	6^{5}	6	[10]
2	(Sweden) J Björkman (Belarus) M Mirnyi	7^{7}	4	[7]

Quarterfinals
7	(Czech Republic) L Dlouhý (Czech Republic) P Vízner	6	7
3	(The Bahamas) M Knowles (Canada) D Nestor	4	5
6	(Israel) J Erlich (Israel) A Ram	6	6
(Serbia) N Djokovic (Serbia) N Zimonjić	2	2

Semifinals
7	(Czech Republic) L Dlouhý (Czech Republic) P Vízner	6^{4}	5
6	(Israel) J Erlich (Israel) A Ram	7^{7}	7
