= 2007 Western & Southern Financial Group Masters – Singles =

Singles
- 2007 Western & Southern Financial Group Masters

Final
- Champion: (Switzerland) Roger Federer
- Runner-up: (United States) James Blake
- Score: 6–1, 6–4

Details
- Draw: 56 (4WC/7Q)
- Seeds: 16

Events
Singles	Doubles
- Cincinnati Masters

Roger Federer defeated James Blake in the final, 6–1, 6–4 to win the men's singles tennis title at the 2007 Cincinnati Masters.

Andy Roddick was the defending champion, but lost in the third round to David Ferrer.

== Seeds ==
The top eight seeds received a bye into the second round.

1. (Switzerland) Roger Federer (champion)
2. (Spain) Rafael Nadal (second round, retired due to an arm injury)
3. (United States) Andy Roddick (third round)
4. (Serbia) Novak Djokovic (second round)
5. (Russia) Nikolay Davydenko (semifinals)
6. (Chile) Fernando González (second round)
7. (Spain) Tommy Robredo (second round)
8. (France) Richard Gasquet (second round, retired due to a blister)
9. (United States) James Blake (final)
10. (Czech Republic) Tomáš Berdych (third round)
11. (Croatia) Ivan Ljubičić (second round)
12. (Germany) Tommy Haas (first round)
13. (Russia) Mikhail Youzhny (second round)
14. (United Kingdom) Andy Murray (first round)
15. (Argentina) Guillermo Cañas (first round)
16. (Spain) David Ferrer (quarterfinals)

== Draw ==
Key

- Q = Qualifier
- WC = Wild card
- LL = Lucky loser
- Alt = Alternate
- ITF = ITF entry
- PR = Protected ranking
- SR = Special ranking
- SE = Special exempt
- JE = Junior exempt
- JR = Junior Accelerator Programme entrant
- CO = College Accelerator Programme entrant
- NG = Next Gen Accelerator Program entrant
- w/o = Walkover
- r = Retired
- d = Defaulted

=== Finals ===
Quarterfinals
1	(Switzerland) Roger Federer	6	3	6
(Spain) Nicolás Almagro	3	6	2
(Spain) Carlos Moyá	2	4
(Australia) Lleyton Hewitt	6	6
5	(Russia) Nikolay Davydenko	6	6
16	(Spain) David Ferrer	2	4
9	(United States) James Blake	5	6	6
WC	(United States) Sam Querrey	7	4	4

Semifinals
1	(Switzerland) Roger Federer	6	6^{7}	7^{7}
(Australia) Lleyton Hewitt	3	7^{9}	6^{1}
5	(Russia) Nikolay Davydenko	4	2
9	(United States) James Blake	6	6

Final
1	(Switzerland) Roger Federer	6	6
9	(United States) James Blake	1	4

=== Top half ===
==== Section 1 ====
First round
(Russia) D Tursunov	4	6	3
Q	(France) J Benneteau	6	3	6
WC	(United Kingdom) T Henman	4	6	3
(Argentina) JI Chela	6	3	6
(Cyprus) M Baghdatis	6	6
14	(United Kingdom) A Murray	1	2
11	(Croatia) I Ljubičić	1	7^{7}	6
Q	(United States) A Delić	6	6^{3}	3
(Spain) N Almagro	7^{7}	6
(Germany) F Mayer	6^{5}	4
(Finland) J Nieminen	6	6
Q	(United States) V Spadea	2	0

Second round
1	(Switzerland) R Federer	6	6
Q	(France) J Benneteau	3	3
(Argentina) JI Chela	7^{8}	4	2
(Cyprus) M Baghdatis	6^{6}	6	6
11	(Croatia) I Ljubičić	4	4
(Spain) N Almagro	6	6
(Finland) J Nieminen	6	6
7	(Spain) T Robredo	4	1

Third round
1	(Switzerland) R Federer	7^{7}	7
(Cyprus) M Baghdatis	6^{5}	5
(Spain) N Almagro	6	6
(Finland) J Nieminen	2	2

Quarterfinals
1	(Switzerland) R Federer	6	3	6
(Spain) N Almagro	3	6	2

==== Section 2 ====
First round
(Spain) C Moyá	7^{7}	7^{7}
(Argentina) D Nalbandian	6^{4}	6^{2}
(Argentina) A Calleri	6^{2}	6	6^{7}
(Germany) P Kohlschreiber	7^{7}	2	7^{9}
Q	(Argentina) JM del Potro	6	6
15	(Argentina) G Cañas	2	2
12	(Germany) T Haas	6	6^{3}	3
(Croatia) M Ančić	3	7^{7}	6
(Austria) J Melzer	7^{7}	7^{7}
(Croatia) I Karlović	6^{4}	6^{2}
(Switzerland) S Wawrinka	5	6	6^{5}
(Australia) L Hewitt	7	3	7^{7}

Second round
4	(Serbia) N Djokovic	4	1
(Spain) C Moyá	6	6
(Germany) P Kohlschreiber	1	6	4
Q	(Argentina) JM del Potro	6	2	6
(Croatia) M Ančić	3	6	6^{9}
(Austria) J Melzer	6	2	7^{11}
(Australia) L Hewitt	6	3
8	(France) R Gasquet	1	2^{r}

Third round
(Spain) C Moyá	7	3	7
Q	(Argentina) JM del Potro	5	6	5
(Austria) J Melzer	3	3
(Australia) L Hewitt	6	6

Quarterfinals
(Spain) C Moyá	2	4
(Australia) L Hewitt	6	6

=== Bottom half ===
==== Section 3 ====
First round
(Sweden) J Björkman	3	3
WC	(United States) R Ginepri	6	6
(France) A Clément	6	6
(France) P-H Mathieu	4	2
(Germany) B Becker	3	4
10	(Czech Republic) T Berdych	6	6
16	(Spain) D Ferrer	7^{7}	6
WC	(United States) J Isner	6^{3}	3
(United States) M Fish	5	6^{3}
(Czech Republic) R Štěpánek	7	7^{7}
(Italy) F Volandri	2	2
(Spain) F Verdasco	6	6

Second round
5	(Russia) N Davydenko	6	6^{7}	6
WC	(United States) R Ginepri	2	7^{9}	3
(France) A Clément	6^{1}	6^{4}
10	(Czech Republic) T Berdych	7^{7}	7^{7}
16	(Spain) D Ferrer	6	7
(Czech Republic) R Štěpánek	2	5
(Spain) F Verdasco	6^{3}	2
3	(United States) A Roddick	7^{7}	6

Third round
5	(Russia) N Davydenko	6	6
10	(Czech Republic) T Berdych	3	2
16	(Spain) D Ferrer	7^{7}	6
3	(United States) A Roddick	6^{4}	4

Quarterfinals
5	(Russia) N Davydenko	6	6
16	(Spain) D Ferrer	2	4

==== Section 4 ====
First round
(Spain) JC Ferrero	6	3	7
Q	(Belgium) C Rochus	1	6	5
(Russia) M Safin	3	6^{1}
(Germany) N Kiefer	6	7^{7}
Q	(Colombia) A Falla	6^{5}	1
9	(United States) J Blake	7^{7}	6
13	(Russia) M Youzhny	6	6
(Slovakia) D Hrbatý	3	1
(France) M Gicquel	5	7	4
WC	(United States) S Querrey	7	5	6
Q	(Spain) F López	4	7^{7}	3
(Argentina) J Mónaco	6	6^{5}	6

Second round
6	(Chile) F González	2	6^{7}
(Spain) JC Ferrero	6	7^{9}
(Germany) N Kiefer	4	4
9	(United States) J Blake	6	6
13	(Russia) M Youzhny	7	3	4
WC	(United States) S Querrey	5	6	6
(Argentina) J Mónaco	7^{7}	4
2	(Spain) R Nadal	6^{5}	1^{r}

Third round
(Spain) JC Ferrero	1	4
9	(United States) J Blake	6	6
WC	(United States) S Querrey	6	7
(Argentina) J Mónaco	3	5

Quarterfinals
9	(United States) J Blake	5	6	6
WC	(United States) S Querrey	7	4	4

== Qualifying ==
=== Qualifying seeds ===
1. (Croatia) ~~Ivo Karlović~~ (withdrew)
2. (France) Gilles Simon (first round)
3. (Russia) Igor Andreev (qualifying competition)
4. (United States) Vince Spadea (qualified)
5. (France) Julien Benneteau (qualified)
6. (Belgium) Olivier Rochus (qualified)
7. (France) Michaël Llodra (first round)
8. (Spain) Feliciano López (qualified)
9. (France) Nicolas Mahut (first round)
10. (Italy) Andreas Seppi (qualifying competition)
11. (France) Sébastien Grosjean (qualifying competition, retired due to a leg injury)
12. (Argentina) Juan Martín del Potro (qualified)
13. (France) Florent Serra (first round)
14. (United States) Amer Delić (qualified)

=== Qualifiers ===
1. (Colombia) Alejandro Falla
2. (Argentina) Juan Martín del Potro
3. (United States) Amer Delić
4. (United States) Vince Spadea
5. (France) Julien Benneteau
6. (Belgium) Olivier Rochus
7. (Spain) Feliciano López

=== Qualifying draw ===
==== First qualifier ====
First round
Alt	(Colombia) Alejandro Falla	6	6
(Czech Republic) Lukáš Dlouhý	0	3
(Croatia) Marin Čilić	7^{7}	3	2
10	(Italy) Andreas Seppi	6^{5}	6	6

Qualifying competition
Alt	(Colombia) Alejandro Falla	6	6
10	(Italy) Andreas Seppi	1	3

==== Second qualifier ====
First round
2	(France) Gilles Simon	4	5
WC	(Latvia) Ernests Gulbis	6	7
(Russia) Evgeny Korolev	2	0
12	(Argentina) Juan Martín del Potro	6	6

Qualifying competition
WC	(Latvia) Ernests Gulbis	5	3
12	(Argentina) Juan Martín del Potro	7	6

==== Third qualifier ====
First round
3	(Russia) Igor Andreev	7^{7}	6
(United States) Robert Kendrick	6^{3}	3
WC	(United States) Justin Kronauge	4	2
14	(United States) Amer Delić	6	6

Qualifying competition
3	(Russia) Igor Andreev	4	6^{4}
14	(United States) Amer Delić	6	7^{7}

==== Fourth qualifier ====
First round
4	(United States) Vince Spadea	6	6
WC	(United States) Rajeev Ram	4	3
Alt	(Romania) Andrei Pavel	6^{4}	6	7^{9}
13	(France) Florent Serra	7^{7}	3	6^{7}

Qualifying competition
4	(United States) Vince Spadea	7^{8}	7^{9}
Alt	(Romania) Andrei Pavel	6^{6}	6^{7}

==== Fifth qualifier ====
First round
5	(France) Julien Benneteau	7^{7}	6
(Ecuador) Nicolás Lapentti	6^{1}	2
(South Africa) Wesley Moodie	1	6	4
11	(France) Sébastien Grosjean	6	3	6

Qualifying competition
5	(France) Julien Benneteau	5	2
11	(France) Sébastien Grosjean	7	1^{r}

==== Sixth qualifier ====
First round
6	(Belgium) Olivier Rochus	7	6
(Spain) Guillermo García López	5	3
WC	(United States) Zack Fleishman	6	7^{7}
9	(France) Nicolas Mahut	3	6^{4}

Qualifying competition
6	(Belgium) Olivier Rochus	6	6
WC	(United States) Zack Fleishman	4	1

==== Seventh qualifier ====
First round
7	(France) Michaël Llodra	4	7^{8}	3
(Russia) Teymuraz Gabashvili	6	6^{6}	6
(Belarus) Max Mirnyi	6^{5}	3
8	(Spain) Feliciano López	7^{7}	6

Qualifying competition
(Russia) Teymuraz Gabashvili	3	4
8	(Spain) Feliciano López	6	6
