= 2004 Western & Southern Financial Group Women's Open – Doubles =

Doubles
- 2004 Western & Southern Financial Group Women's Open

Final
- Champions: (United States) Jill Craybas (Germany) Marlene Weingärtner
- Runners-up: (Switzerland) Emmanuelle Gagliardi (Germany) Anna-Lena Grönefeld
- Score: 7–5, 7–6^{(7–2)}

Details
- Draw: 16
- Seeds: 4

Events
Singles	Doubles
← 1988 ·	Cincinnati Masters	· 2005 →

This event was not held from 1989 onwards, so not defending champions were declared. Beth Herr and Candy Reynolds were the last champions in the 1988 edition.

Jill Craybas and Marlene Weingärtner won the title, defeating Emmanuelle Gagliardi and Anna-Lena Grönefeld 7–5, 7–6^{(7–2)} in the final. It was the 2nd title for Craybas and the 1st and only title for Weingärtner, in their respective careers.

== Seeds ==
1. (United States) ~~Lisa McShea~~ / (Venezuela) ~~Milagros Sequera~~ (withdrew due to a left foot sprain on Sequera)
2. (Ukraine) Elena Tatarkova / (United States) Meilen Tu (semifinals)
3. (United States) Jill Craybas / (Germany) Marlene Weingärtner (champions)
4. (Italy) Rita Grande / (Italy) Flavia Pennetta (second round, retired due to a left wrist strain on Pennetta)
5. (United States) Teryn Ashley / (United States) Laura Granville (semifinals)

== Draw ==
=== Key ===
- Q = Qualifier
- WC = Wild card
- LL = Lucky loser
- Alt = Alternate
- SE = Special exempt
- PR = Protected ranking
- ITF = ITF entry
- JE = Junior exempt
- w/o = Walkover
- r = Retired
- d = Defaulted
- SR = Special ranking

=== Draw ===
First round
5	(United States) T Ashley (United States) L Granville	7^{7}	5	6
(Chinese Taipei) J Lee (China) S Peng	6^{5}	7	2
(United States) J Russell (Italy) M Santangelo	6	6
WC	(United States) Lindsey Molony (United States) Kara Molony-Hussey	0	0
4	(Italy) R Grande (Italy) F Pennetta	6	6
(Italy) An Serra Zanetti (Romania) A Vanc	4	2
(Japan) N Miyagi (United States) L Osterloh	2	1
(Switzerland) E Gagliardi (Germany) A-L Grönefeld	6	6
(France) M Bartoli (France) S Beltrame	7	6
(Russia) A Jidkova (Australia) B Stewart	5	2
LL	(Tunisia) S Sfar (Canada) A Soukup	0	3
3	(United States) J Craybas (Germany) M Weingärtner	6	6
(United States) A Augustus (United States) J Ditty	6^{4}	0
(United States) J Hopkins (United States) M Washington	7^{7}	6
Q	(New Zealand) L Baker (Italy) F Lubiani	4	4
2	(Ukraine) E Tatarkova (United States) M Tu	6	6

Second round
5	(United States) T Ashley (United States) L Granville	1	6	6
(United States) J Russell (Italy) M Santangelo	6	3	3
4	(Italy) R Grande (Italy) F Pennetta	2	0^{r}
(Switzerland) E Gagliardi (Germany) A-L Grönefeld	6	0
(France) M Bartoli (France) S Beltrame	0^{r}
3	(United States) J Craybas (Germany) M Weingärtner	2
(United States) J Hopkins (United States) M Washington	4	4
2	(Ukraine) E Tatarkova (United States) M Tu	6	6

Semifinals
5	(United States) T Ashley (United States) L Granville	2	2
(Switzerland) E Gagliardi (Germany) A-L Grönefeld	6	6
3	(United States) J Craybas (Germany) M Weingärtner	6	6
2	(Ukraine) E Tatarkova (United States) M Tu	1	3

Final
(Switzerland) E Gagliardi (Germany) A-L Grönefeld	5	6^{2}
3	(United States) J Craybas (Germany) M Weingärtner	7	7^{7}
