= 2004 Western & Southern Financial Group Women's Open – Singles =

Singles
- 2004 Western & Southern Financial Group Women's Open

Final
- Champion: (United States) Lindsay Davenport
- Runner-up: (Russia) Vera Zvonareva
- Score: 6–3, 6–2

Details
- Draw: 30
- Seeds: 8

Events
Singles	Doubles
← 1988 ·	Cincinnati Masters	· 2005 →

Lindsay Davenport defeated Vera Zvonareva 6–3, 6–2 in the final to win the women's singles tennis title at the 2004 Cincinnati Open. It was her 6th title of the year and the 44th of her career.

This event was not held from 1989 onwards, so no defending champion was declared. Barbara Potter was the last champion in the 1988 edition.

== Seeds ==
The first two seeds received a bye into the second round.

1. (United States) Lindsay Davenport (champion)
2. (Russia) Vera Zvonareva (final)
3. (United States) Amy Frazier (semifinal)
4. (France) Marion Bartoli (semifinal, withdrew due to a right hand blister)
5. (Czech Republic) Denisa Chládková (second round)
6. (United States) Jill Craybas (first round)
7. (Italy) Flavia Pennetta (quarterfinals)
8. (Germany) Marlene Weingärtner (second round)

== Draw ==
=== Key ===
- Q = Qualifier
- WC = Wild card
- LL = Lucky loser
- Alt = Alternate
- SE = Special exempt
- PR = Protected ranking
- ITF = ITF entry
- JE = Junior exempt
- w/o = Walkover
- r = Retired
- d = Defaulted
- SR = Special ranking

=== Finals ===
Semifinals
WC/1	(United States) Lindsay Davenport	w/o
4	(France) Marion Bartoli
3	(United States) Amy Frazier	6	6^{4}	1
2	(Russia) Vera Zvonareva	3	7^{7}	6

Final
WC/1	(United States) Lindsay Davenport	6	6
2	(Russia) Vera Zvonareva	3	2

=== Top half ===
First round
WC	(United States) L Osterloh	6	6
Q	(Italy) Ad Serra Zanetti	2	3
(France) V Razzano	1	2
(Italy) R Grande	6	6
(United States) T Ashley	7^{8}	6^{3}	5
7	(Italy) F Pennetta	6^{6}	7^{7}	7
4	(France) M Bartoli	6	6
(Russia) M Kirilenko	3	3
(Italy) M Santangelo	4	6	7
Q	(France) S Beltrame	6	3	5
(United States) L Granville	2	6	6
(Czech Republic) S Kleinová	6	3	4
Q	(Ukraine) Y Fedak	4	4
5	(Czech Republic) D Chládková	6	6

Second round
WC/1	(United States) L Davenport	4	6	6
WC	(United States) L Osterloh	6	4	1
(Italy) R Grande	7^{7}	2	4
7	(Italy) F Pennetta	6^{1}	6	6
4	(France) M Bartoli	6	6
(Italy) M Santangelo	4	0
(United States) L Granville	6	6
5	(Czech Republic) D Chládková	1	1

Quarterfinals
WC/1	(United States) L Davenport	6	6
7	(Italy) F Pennetta	2	2
4	(France) M Bartoli	6	6
(United States) L Granville	3	1

Semifinals
WC/1	(United States) L Davenport	w/o
4	(France) M Bartoli

=== Bottom half ===
First round
8	(Germany) M Weingärtner	6	3	6
(Switzerland) E Gagliardi	3	6	2
(Tunisia) S Sfar	6	0
(France) C Pin	4	0^{r}
(United States) M Irvin	2	4
(United States) M Washington	6	6
LL	(France) S Foretz	2	5
3	(United States) A Frazier	6	7
6	(United States) J Craybas	3	3
Q	(China) S Peng	6	6
(Russia) A Jidkova	6^{4}	6	7^{7}
(United States) L Waters	7^{7}	4	6^{1}
(Germany) A-L Grönefeld	6^{2}	2
LL	(Italy) An Serra Zanetti	7^{7}	6

Second round
8	(Germany) M Weingärtner	7	4	3
(Tunisia) S Sfar	5	6	6
(United States) M Washington	4	3
3	(United States) A Frazier	6	6
Q	(China) S Peng	7	4	6
(Russia) A Jidkova	5	6	1
LL	(Italy) An Serra Zanetti	4	6^{3}
2	(Russia) V Zvonareva	6	7^{7}

Quarterfinals
(Tunisia) S Sfar	3	1
3	(United States) A Frazier	6	6
Q	(China) S Peng	2	2
2	(Russia) V Zvonareva	6	6

Semifinals
3	(United States) A Frazier	6	6^{4}	1
2	(Russia) V Zvonareva	3	7^{7}	6
