= 2007 Western & Southern Financial Group Women's Open – Singles =

Singles
- 2007 Western & Southern Financial Group Women's Open

Final
- Champion: (Russia) Anna Chakvetadze
- Runner-up: (Japan) Akiko Morigami
- Score: 6–1, 6–3

Details
- Draw: 32
- Seeds: 8

Events
Singles	Doubles
← 2006 ·	Western & Southern Financial Group Women's Open	· 2008 →

Vera Zvonareva was the defending champion, but had to withdraw before the tournament began due to a right wrist injury.

Anna Chakvetadze won the title, defeating Akiko Morigami 6–1, 6–3 in the final.

== Seeds ==
1. (Russia) Anna Chakvetadze (champion)
2. (Switzerland) Patty Schnyder (quarterfinals)
3. (India) Sania Mirza (semifinals)
4. (United States) Meilen Tu (withdrew due to left wrist injury)
5. (Japan) Aiko Nakamura (first round)
6. (Russia) Elena Vesnina (quarterfinals, retired due to a right shoulder injury)
7. (Japan) Akiko Morigami (final)
8. (France) Séverine Brémond (withdrew due to illness)
9. (United States) Jill Craybas (second round)

== Draw ==
=== Key ===
- Q = Qualifier
- WC = Wild card
- LL = Lucky loser
- Alt = Alternate
- SE = Special exempt
- PR = Protected ranking
- ITF = ITF entry
- JE = Junior exempt
- w/o = Walkover
- r = Retired
- d = Defaulted
- SR = Special ranking

=== Finals ===
Semifinals
1	(Russia) Anna Chakvetadze	6	5	6
3	(India) Sania Mirza	2	7	3
Q	(Uzbekistan) Akgul Amanmuradova	7	4	3
7	(Japan) Akiko Morigami	6^{8}	6	6

Final
1	(Russia) Anna Chakvetadze	6	6
7	(Japan) Akiko Morigami	1	3

=== Top half ===
First round
1	(Russia) A Chakvetadze	6	6
(Belarus) T Poutchek	4	0
(Hungary) M Czink	3	2
Q	(Romania) A Perianu	6	6
(China) M Yuan	6	4	6
(Australia) C Dellacqua	4	6	2
(Germany) A Bachmann	3	4
6	(Russia) E Vesnina	6	6
3	(India) S Mirza	6	6
(United States) A Spears	4	3
(Uzbekistan) V Lepchenko	6	6
WC	(United States) K Flower	2	2
(Russia) A Jidkova	6	4	4
(Belarus) O Govortsova	4	6	6
WC	(United States) A Glatch	2	4
9	(United States) J Craybas	6	6

Second round
1	(Russia) A Chakvetadze	6	6
Q	(Romania) A Perianu	4	3
(China) M Yuan	1	4
6	(Russia) E Vesnina	6	6
3	(India) S Mirza	6	6
(Uzbekistan) V Lepchenko	2	2
(Belarus) O Govortsova	6^{5}	6	6
9	(United States) J Craybas	7	3	1

Quarterfinals
1	(Russia) A Chakvetadze	6^{3}	6	4
6	(Russia) E Vesnina	7	0	1^{r}
3	(India) S Mirza	6	6
(Belarus) O Govortsova	1	1

Semifinals
1	(Russia) A Chakvetadze	6	5	6
3	(India) S Mirza	2	7	3

=== Bottom half ===
First round
5	(Japan) A Nakamura	6	4	6^{4}
Q	(Georgia (country)) A Tatishvili	1	6	7
(United States) L Osterloh	6	6
(Ukraine) V Kutuzova	2	3
WC	(United States) C Hsu	1	3
Q	(Uzbekistan) A Amanmuradova	6	6
(United States) B Mattek	6	6
LL	(Belarus) I Kuryanovich	1	3
7	(Japan) A Morigami	4	7	7
(France) C Pin	6	6^{6}	6^{2}
(Russia) A Rodionova	6	4	0^{d}
(Germany) A Kerber	4	6	1
Q	(Netherlands) B Schultz-McCarthy	6	6
(Colombia) C Castaño	2	4
LL	(Australia) M Adamczak	2	5
2	(Switzerland) P Schnyder	6	7

Second round
Q	(Georgia (country)) A Tatishvili	5	1
(United States) L Osterloh	7	6
Q	(Uzbekistan) A Amanmuradova	2	7	7
(United States) B Mattek	6	5	6^{4}
7	(Japan) A Morigami	6	6
(Germany) A Kerber	2	2
Q	(Netherlands) B Schultz-McCarthy	2	3
2	(Switzerland) P Schnyder	6	6

Quarterfinals
(United States) L Osterloh	1	4
Q	(Uzbekistan) A Amanmuradova	6	6
7	(Japan) A Morigami	6	6
2	(Switzerland) P Schnyder	3	1

Semifinals
Q	(Uzbekistan) A Amanmuradova	7	4	3
7	(Japan) A Morigami	6^{8}	6	6
