= 2006 Western & Southern Financial Group Masters – Doubles =

Doubles
- 2006 Western & Southern Financial Group Masters

Final
- Champions: (Sweden) Jonas Björkman (Belarus) Max Mirnyi
- Runners-up: (United States) Bob Bryan (United States) Mike Bryan
- Score: 3–6, 6–3, [10–7]

Events
| Singles | Doubles |
| ← 2005 · | Western & Southern Financial Group Masters | · 2007 → |

Jonas Björkman and Max Mirnyi were the defending champions and successfully defended their title, defeating Bob and Mike Bryan 3–6, 6–3, [10–7] in the final.

== Seeds ==
All seeds received a bye into the second round.

1. (United States) Bob Bryan / (United States) Mike Bryan (final)
2. (Sweden) Jonas Björkman / (Belarus) Max Mirnyi (champions)
3. (The Bahamas) Mark Knowles / (Canada) Daniel Nestor (quarterfinals)
4. (Australia) Paul Hanley / (Zimbabwe) Kevin Ullyett (second round)
5. (France) Fabrice Santoro / (Serbia) Nenad Zimonjić (quarterfinals)
6. (Israel) Jonathan Erlich / (Israel) Andy Ram (semifinals)
7. (Czech Republic) Martin Damm / (India) Leander Paes (semifinals)
8. (Sweden) Simon Aspelin / (Australia) Todd Perry (quarterfinals)

== Draw ==
=== Key ===
- Q = Qualifier
- WC = Wild card
- LL = Lucky loser
- Alt = Alternate
- ITF = ITF entry
- PR = Protected ranking
- SR = Special ranking
- SE = Special exempt
- JE = Junior exempt
- JR = Junior Accelerator Programme entrant
- CO = College Accelerator Programme entrant
- NG = Next Gen Accelerator Program entrant
- w/o = Walkover
- r = Retired
- d = Defaulted

=== Finals ===
Semifinals
1 | (United States) Bob Bryan (United States) Mike Bryan | 7^{7} | 6
6 | (Israel) Jonathan Erlich (Israel) Andy Ram | 6^{4} | 3
7 | (Czech Republic) Martin Damm (India) Leander Paes | 6^{3} | 2
2 | (Sweden) Jonas Björkman (Belarus) Max Mirnyi | 7^{7} | 6

Final
1 | (United States) Bob Bryan (United States) Mike Bryan | 6 | 3 | [7]
2 | (Sweden) Jonas Björkman (Belarus) Max Mirnyi | 3 | 6 | [10]

=== Top half ===
First round
(Spain) D Ferrer (Spain) T Robredo | 1 | 2
(Australia) W Arthurs (Slovakia) D Hrbatý | 6 | 6
(Serbia) N Djokovic (Spain) F Verdasco | 6 | 5 | [5]
WC | (United States) P Goldstein (United States) J Thomas | 3 | 7 | [10]
(Russia) M Safin (Russia) M Youzhny | 7^{7} | 3 | [10]
(Czech Republic) F Čermák (Austria) J Knowle | 6^{5} | 6 | [3]
(Czech Republic) T Berdych (Czech Republic) J Levinský | 5 | 6 | [9]
(India) M Bhupathi (United States) J Gimelstob | 7 | 4 | [11]

Second round
1 | (United States) B Bryan (United States) M Bryan | 6 | 6
(Australia) W Arthurs (Slovakia) D Hrbatý | 4 | 4
WC | (United States) P Goldstein (United States) J Thomas | 7 | 5 | [6]
8 | (Sweden) S Aspelin (Australia) T Perry | 5 | 7 | [10]
4 | (Australia) P Hanley (Zimbabwe) K Ullyett | 6 | 6^{4} | [7]
(Russia) M Safin (Russia) M Youzhny | 1 | 7^{7} | [10]
(India) M Bhupathi (United States) J Gimelstob | 6^{1} | 7 | [4]
6 | (Israel) J Erlich (Israel) A Ram | 7^{7} | 5 | [10]

Quarterfinals
1 | (United States) B Bryan (United States) M Bryan | 6 | 6
8 | (Sweden) S Aspelin (Australia) T Perry | 0 | 3
(Russia) M Safin (Russia) M Youzhny | 4 | 2
6 | (Israel) J Erlich (Israel) A Ram | 6 | 6

Semifinals
1 | (United States) B Bryan (United States) M Bryan | 7^{7} | 6
6 | (Israel) J Erlich (Israel) A Ram | 6^{4} | 3

=== Bottom half ===
First round
(Czech Republic) L Dlouhý (Czech Republic) P Vízner | 1 | 7^{7} | [10]
(South Africa) C Haggard (France) G Monfils | 6 | 6^{1} | [3]
(Poland) M Fyrstenberg (Poland) M Matkowski | 3 | 4
(Argentina) J Acasuso (Argentina) S Prieto | 6 | 6
Alt | (Italy) D Bracciali (Italy) A Seppi | 4 | 1
(Sweden) R Lindstedt (Finland) J Nieminen | 6 | 6
(Czech Republic) L Friedl (Czech Republic) C Suk | 4 | 7 | [4]
WC | (Spain) F López (Spain) R Nadal | 6 | 5 | [10]

Second round
7 | (Czech Republic) M Damm (India) L Paes | 6 | 6
(Czech Republic) L Dlouhý (Czech Republic) P Vízner | 3 | 2
(Argentina) J Acasuso (Argentina) S Prieto | 4 | 3
3 | (The Bahamas) M Knowles (Canada) D Nestor | 6 | 6
5 | (France) F Santoro (Serbia) N Zimonjić | 7^{7} | 6
(Sweden) R Lindstedt (Finland) J Nieminen | 6^{5} | 4
WC | (Spain) F López (Spain) R Nadal | 1 | 2
2 | (Sweden) J Björkman (Belarus) M Mirnyi | 6 | 6

Quarterfinals
7 | (Czech Republic) M Damm (India) L Paes | 3 | 7 | [10]
3 | (The Bahamas) M Knowles (Canada) D Nestor | 6 | 5 | [4]
5 | (France) F Santoro (Serbia) N Zimonjić | 3 | 4
2 | (Sweden) J Björkman (Belarus) M Mirnyi | 6 | 6

Semifinals
7 | (Czech Republic) M Damm (India) L Paes | 6^{3} | 2
2 | (Sweden) J Björkman (Belarus) M Mirnyi | 7^{7} | 6
