= 2005 Western & Southern Financial Group Women's Open – Singles =

Singles
- 2005 Western & Southern Financial Group Women's Open

Final
- Champion: (Switzerland) Patty Schnyder
- Runner-up: (Japan) Akiko Morigami
- Score: 6–4, 6–0

Details
- Draw: 32
- Seeds: 8

Events
Singles	Doubles
← 2004 ·	Western & Southern Financial Group Women's Open	· 2006 →

Lindsay Davenport was the defending champion, but decided not to participate that year.

Patty Schnyder won the title, defeating Akiko Morigami 6–4, 6–0 in the final.

== Seeds ==
1. (Switzerland) Patty Schnyder (champion)
2. (Russia) Vera Zvonareva (second round)
3. (Serbia and Montenegro) Jelena Janković (quarterfinals)
4. (Slovakia) Daniela Hantuchová (semifinals)
5. (France) Marion Bartoli (first round)
6. (Japan) Ai Sugiyama (second round)
7. (Germany) Anna-Lena Grönefeld (first round)
8. (Czech Republic) Květa Peschke (first round)

== Draw ==
=== Key ===
- Q = Qualifier
- WC = Wild card
- LL = Lucky loser
- Alt = Alternate
- SE = Special exempt
- PR = Protected ranking
- ITF = ITF entry
- JE = Junior exempt
- w/o = Walkover
- r = Retired
- d = Defaulted
- SR = Special ranking

=== Finals ===
Semifinals
1	(Switzerland) Patty Schnyder	6	6
Q	(United States) Bethanie Mattek	4	1
4	(Slovakia) Daniela Hantuchová	4	4
(Japan) Akiko Morigami	6	6

Final
1	(Switzerland) Patty Schnyder	6	6
(Japan) Akiko Morigami	4	0

=== Top half ===
First round
1	(Switzerland) P Schnyder	6	6
WC	(Denmark) C Wozniacki	3	0
(Japan) A Nakamura	6^{4}	6	6
(United States) A Spears	7^{7}	0	3
(Ukraine) Y Fedak	2	3
(Israel) S Pe'er	6	6
(United States) L Lee-Waters	5	2
6	(Japan) A Sugiyama	7	6
3	(Serbia and Montenegro) J Janković	4	6	6
Q	(Argentina) ME Salerni	6	3	0
Q	(Austria) S Bammer	7	6
(Czech Republic) I Benešová	5	3
(Luxembourg) A Kremer	5	2
(France) C Pin	7	6
Q	(United States) B Mattek	1	6	7^{7}
5	(France) M Bartoli	6	4	6^{0}

Second round
1	(Switzerland) P Schnyder	4	6	6
(Japan) A Nakamura	6	1	3
(Israel) S Pe'er	5	7^{8}	6
6	(Japan) A Sugiyama	7	6^{6}	4
3	(Serbia and Montenegro) J Janković	6	7
Q	(Austria) S Bammer	3	5
(France) C Pin	3	0^{r}
Q	(United States) B Mattek	6	2

Quarterfinals
1	(Switzerland) P Schnyder	7^{7}	6
(Israel) S Pe'er	6^{1}	2
3	(Serbia and Montenegro) J Janković	1	6	2
Q	(United States) B Mattek	6	0	6

Semifinal
1	(Switzerland) P Schnyder	6	6
Q	(United States) B Mattek	4	1

=== Bottom half ===
First round
8	(Czech Republic) K Peschke	4	6^{6}
(Russia) T Panova	6	7^{8}
(Russia) A Jidkova	6^{5}	3
(South Korea) Y-j Cho	7^{7}	6
(United States) C Rubin	6	6
(United States) L Granville	3	4
(United States) L Osterloh	1	2
4	(Slovakia) D Hantuchová	6	6
7	(Germany) A-L Grönefeld	4	3
(India) S Mirza	6	6
(Puerto Rico) K Brandi	6	6
WC	(United States) J Kirkland	3	1
(Japan) A Morigami	6	6
Q	(United States) CA Avants	3	4
(United States) M Shaughnessy	3	3
2	(Russia) V Zvonareva	6	6

Second round
(Russia) T Panova	7^{8}	2	2
(South Korea) Y-j Cho	6^{6}	6	6
(United States) C Rubin	2	5
4	(Slovakia) D Hantuchová	6	7
(India) S Mirza	7^{7}	7
(Puerto Rico) K Brandi	6^{5}	5
(Japan) A Morigami	6	6
2	(Russia) V Zvonareva	3	2

Quarterfinals
(South Korea) Y-j Cho	7^{7}	4	1
4	(Slovakia) D Hantuchová	6^{1}	6	6
(India) S Mirza	4	3
(Japan) A Morigami	6	6

Semifinal
4	(Slovakia) D Hantuchová	4	4
(Japan) A Morigami	6	6
