= 2006 Western & Southern Financial Group Women's Open – Singles =

Singles
- 2006 Western & Southern Financial Group Women's Open

Final
- Champion: (Russia) Vera Zvonareva
- Runner-up: (Slovenia) Katarina Srebotnik
- Score: 6–2, 6–4

Details
- Draw: 32
- Seeds: 8

Events
Singles	Doubles
← 2005 ·	Western & Southern Financial Group Women's Open	· 2007 →

Patty Schnyder was the defending champion, but lost in semifinals to Katarina Srebotnik

Vera Zvonareva won the title, defeating Srebotnik 6–2, 6–4 in the final. It was the 2nd title of the year and the 5th on her career.

== Seeds ==
1. (Switzerland) Patty Schnyder (semifinals)
2. (Russia) Anastasia Myskina (first round)
3. (Slovakia) ~~Daniela Hantuchová~~ (withdrew due to a right foot injury)
4. (Slovenia) Katarina Srebotnik (final)
5. (Serbia and Montenegro) Jelena Janković (quarterfinals)
6. (France) Marion Bartoli (quarterfinals)
7. (France) Tatiana Golovin (first round)
8. (Argentina) Gisela Dulko (second round)
9. (India) Sania Mirza (quarterfinals)

== Draw ==
=== Key ===
- Q = Qualifier
- WC = Wild card
- LL = Lucky loser
- Alt = Alternate
- ITF = ITF entry
- PR = Protected ranking
- SR = Special ranking
- SE = Special exempt
- JE = Junior exempt
- JR = Junior Accelerator Programme entrant
- CO = College Accelerator Programme entrant
- NG = Next Gen Accelerator Program entrant
- w/o = Walkover
- r = Retired
- d = Defaulted

=== Finals ===
Semifinals
1	(Switzerland) Patty Schnyder	6	3	6^{6}
4	(Slovenia) Katarina Srebotnik	4	6	7^{8}
(Russia) Vera Zvonareva	6	6
(United States) Serena Williams	2	3

Final
4	(Slovenia) Katarina Srebotnik	2	4
(Russia) Vera Zvonareva	6	6

=== Top half ===
First round
1	(Switzerland) P Schnyder	5	6	7^{7}
(United States) L Osterloh	7	2	6^{1}
Q	(United States) A Spears	6	5	6
WC	(United States) A Glatch	3	7	4
(Austria) S Bammer	3	1
(Finland) E Laine	6	6
LL	(United States) A Stevenson	1	0^{r}
9	(India) S Mirza	6	2
4	(Slovenia) K Srebotnik	6	7^{7}
Q	(Paraguay) R de los Ríos	3	6^{3}
(China) M Yuan	6	7
(Argentina) M Díaz Oliva	3	5
Q	(Russia) V Bardina	6^{3}	6	6
(Czech Republic) H Šromová	7^{7}	4	2
Q	(Chinese Taipei) C-w Chan	2	3
6	(France) M Bartoli	6	6

Second round
1	(Switzerland) P Schnyder	6	6
Q	(United States) A Spears	1	0
(Finland) E Laine	1	6	1
9	(India) S Mirza	6	0	6
4	(Slovenia) K Srebotnik	7^{7}	6
(China) M Yuan	6^{3}	1
Q	(Russia) V Bardina	2	6	3
6	(France) M Bartoli	6	2	6

Quarterfinals
1	(Switzerland) P Schnyder	7^{9}	7
9	(India) S Mirza	6^{7}	5
4	(Slovenia) K Srebotnik	6	6
6	(France) M Bartoli	2	1

Semifinals
1	(Switzerland) P Schnyder	6	3	6^{6}
4	(Slovenia) K Srebotnik	4	6	7^{8}

=== Bottom half ===
First round
7	(France) T Golovin	3	0
(Russia) V Zvonareva	6	6
(Uzbekistan) V Lepchenko	4	6	6
LL	(South Africa) N Grandin	6	1	3
LL	(United States) C Gullickson	1	1
(Italy) ME Camerin	6	6
(Ukraine) O Savchuk	3	2
5	(Serbia and Montenegro) J Janković	6	6
8	(Argentina) G Dulko	7	6
(Poland) M Domachowska	5	3
WC	(United States) J Kirkland	3	4
(United States) A Frazier	6	6
(United States) B Mattek	3	6	6
(United States) S Perry	6	1	2
(United States) S Williams	6	6
2	(Russia) A Myskina	2	2

Second round
(Russia) V Zvonareva	6	6
(Uzbekistan) V Lepchenko	0	2
(Italy) ME Camerin	4	4
5	(Serbia and Montenegro) J Janković	6	6
8	(Argentina) G Dulko	3	1
(United States) A Frazier	6	6
(United States) B Mattek	3	1
(United States) S Williams	6	6

Quarterfinals
(Russia) V Zvonareva	6	6
5	(Serbia and Montenegro) J Janković	1	1
(United States) A Frazier	2	2
(United States) S Williams	6	6

Semifinals
(Russia) V Zvonareva	6	6
(United States) S Williams	2	3
