= 2005 Western & Southern Financial Group Masters – Doubles =

Doubles
- 2005 Western & Southern Financial Group Masters

Final
- Champions: (Sweden) Jonas Björkman (Belarus) Max Mirnyi
- Runners-up: (Zimbabwe) Wayne Black (Zimbabwe) Kevin Ullyett
- Score: 7–6^{(7–3)}, 6–2

Events
Singles	Doubles
← 2004 ·	Western & Southern Financial Group Masters	· 2006 →

Mark Knowles and Daniel Nestor were the defending champions, but lost in semifinals to Jonas Björkman and Max Mirnyi.

Björkman and Mirnyi won the title, defeating Wayne Black and Kevin Ullyett 7–6^{(7–3)}, 6–2 in the final.

== Seeds ==
All seeds received a bye into the second round.

1. (United States) Bob Bryan / (United States) Mike Bryan (second round)
2. (Sweden) Jonas Björkman / (Belarus) Max Mirnyi (champions)
3. (The Bahamas) Mark Knowles / (Canada) Daniel Nestor (semifinals)
4. (Zimbabwe) Wayne Black / (Zimbabwe) Kevin Ullyett (final)
5. (India) Leander Paes / (Serbia and Montenegro) Nenad Zimonjić (quarterfinals)
6. (France) Michaël Llodra / (France) Fabrice Santoro (semifinals)
7. (India) Mahesh Bhupathi / (Czech Republic) Martin Damm (quarterfinals)
8. (Australia) Wayne Arthurs / (Australia) Paul Hanley (second round)

== Draw ==
=== Key ===
- Q = Qualifier
- WC = Wild card
- LL = Lucky loser
- Alt = Alternate
- ITF = ITF entry
- PR = Protected ranking
- SR = Special ranking
- SE = Special exempt
- JE = Junior exempt
- JR = Junior Accelerator Programme entrant
- CO = College Accelerator Programme entrant
- NG = Next Gen Accelerator Program entrant
- w/o = Walkover
- r = Retired
- d = Defaulted

=== Finals ===
Semifinals
6	(France) Michaël Llodra (France) Fabrice Santoro	6	2	2
4	(Zimbabwe) Wayne Black (Zimbabwe) Kevin Ullyett	4	6	6
3	(The Bahamas) Mark Knowles (Canada) Daniel Nestor	3	4
2	(Sweden) Jonas Björkman (Belarus) Max Mirnyi	6	6

Final
4	(Zimbabwe) Wayne Black (Zimbabwe) Kevin Ullyett	6^{3}	2
2	(Sweden) Jonas Björkman (Belarus) Max Mirnyi	7^{7}	6

=== Top half ===
First round
(Australia) S Huss (South Africa) W Moodie	6	7^{7}
(Russia) N Davydenko (Czech Republic) J Novák	3	6^{2}
WC	(United States) J Gimelstob (United States) R Leach	6^{12}	6	6
(Slovakia) D Hrbatý (United States) G Oliver	7^{14}	3	4
(Czech Republic) L Friedl (Romania) A Pavel	6^{5}	6	7^{7}
(Switzerland) Y Allegro (Switzerland) R Federer	7^{7}	1	6^{2}
(Chile) N Massú (United States) T Parrott	3	7^{8}	6^{5}
(Spain) F López (Russia) M Youzhny	6	6^{6}	7^{7}

Second round
1	(United States) B Bryan (United States) M Bryan	3	6	5
(Australia) S Huss (South Africa) W Moodie	6	3	7
WC	(United States) J Gimelstob (United States) R Leach	3	2
6	(France) M Llodra (France) F Santoro	6	6
4	(Zimbabwe) W Black (Zimbabwe) K Ullyett	6	6
(Czech Republic) L Friedl (Romania) A Pavel	4	4
(Spain) F López (Russia) M Youzhny	4	6^{3}
5	(India) L Paes (Serbia and Montenegro) N Zimonjić	6	7^{7}

Quarterfinals
(Australia) S Huss (South Africa) W Moodie	6^{0}	4
6	(France) M Llodra (France) F Santoro	7^{7}	6
4	(Zimbabwe) W Black (Zimbabwe) K Ullyett	7	6^{6}	7^{7}
5	(India) L Paes (Serbia and Montenegro) N Zimonjić	5	7^{8}	6^{5}

Semifinals
6	(France) M Llodra (France) F Santoro	6	2	2
4	(Zimbabwe) W Black (Zimbabwe) K Ullyett	4	6	6

=== Bottom half ===
First round
(Israel) J Erlich (Israel) A Ram	3	4
WC	(United States) J Morrison (United States) J Thomas	6	6
(Czech Republic) C Suk (Czech Republic) P Vízner	6^{6}	6	6
(Croatia) M Ančić (Croatia) L Ljubičić	7^{8}	2	2
(Spain) D Ferrer (Spain) T Robredo	6	6^{5}	6
(Argentina) G Etlis (Argentina) M Rodríguez	4	7^{7}	1
(Sweden) S Aspelin (Australia) T Perry	6	7
Alt	(Slovakia) K Beck (Czech Republic) T Berdych	3	5

Second round
7	(India) M Bhupathi (Czech Republic) M Damm	3	6	6
WC	(United States) J Morrison (United States) J Thomas	6	3	2
(Czech Republic) C Suk (Czech Republic) P Vízner	1	6^{3}
3	(The Bahamas) M Knowles (Canada) D Nestor	6	7^{7}
8	(Australia) W Arthurs (Australia) P Hanley	4	7	2
(Spain) D Ferrer (Spain) T Robredo	6	5	6
(Sweden) S Aspelin (Australia) T Perry	7	3	4
2	(Sweden) J Björkman (Belarus) M Mirnyi	5	6	6

Quarterfinals
7	(India) M Bhupathi (Czech Republic) M Damm	6	1	6^{3}
3	(The Bahamas) M Knowles (Canada) D Nestor	3	6	7^{7}
(Spain) D Ferrer (Spain) T Robredo	1	1
2	(Sweden) J Björkman (Belarus) M Mirnyi	6	6

Semifinals
3	(The Bahamas) M Knowles (Canada) D Nestor	3	4
2	(Sweden) J Björkman (Belarus) M Mirnyi	6	6
