= 2004 Western & Southern Financial Group Masters =

2004 Western & Southern Financial Group Masters and Western & Southern Financial Group Women's Open
- Date: 2–8 August (men); 16–22 August (women)
- Edition: 103rd
- Surface: Hard / Outdoor
- Location: Mason, United States
- Venue: Lindner Family Tennis Center

Champions

Men's singles
- (United States) Andre Agassi

Women's singles
- (United States) Lindsay Davenport

Men's doubles
- (The Bahamas) Mark Knowles / (Canada) Daniel Nestor

Women's doubles
- (United States) Jill Craybas / (United States) Marlene Weingärtner
- Western & Southern Financial Group Masters Western & Southern Financial Group Women's Open

The 2004 Cincinnati Masters (also known as the Western & Southern Financial Group Masters and Western & Southern Financial Group Women's Open for sponsorship reasons) was a tennis tournament played on outdoor hard courts. It was the 103rd edition of the Cincinnati Masters, and was part of the ATP Masters Series of the 2004 ATP Tour, and of the Tier III Series of the 2004 WTA Tour. Both the men's and the women's events took place at the Lindner Family Tennis Center in Mason, near Cincinnati, Ohio, United States. It was the first Cincinnati event to feature both men and women's draws since 1989.

== Finals ==
=== Men's singles ===
(United States) Andre Agassi defeated (Australia) Lleyton Hewitt, 6–3, 3–6, 6–2

- It was Andre Agassi's 9th title of the year, and his 31st overall. It was his 4th Masters title of the year and his 8th overall.

=== Women's singles ===
(United States) Lindsay Davenport defeated (Russia) Vera Zvonareva 6–3, 6–2

- It was Lindsay Davenport's 2nd title of the year and her 10th overall.

=== Men's doubles ===
(The Bahamas) Mark Knowles / (Canada) Daniel Nestor defeated (Sweden) Jonas Björkman / (Australia) Todd Woodbridge, 6–2, 3–6, 6–3

=== Women's doubles ===
(United States) Jill Craybas / (Germany) Marlene Weingärtner defeated (Switzerland) Emmanuelle Gagliardi / (Germany) Anna-Lena Grönefeld 7-5, 7-6^{(7–2)}
