= Paul Hanley (tennis) =

Australian tennis player (born 1977)

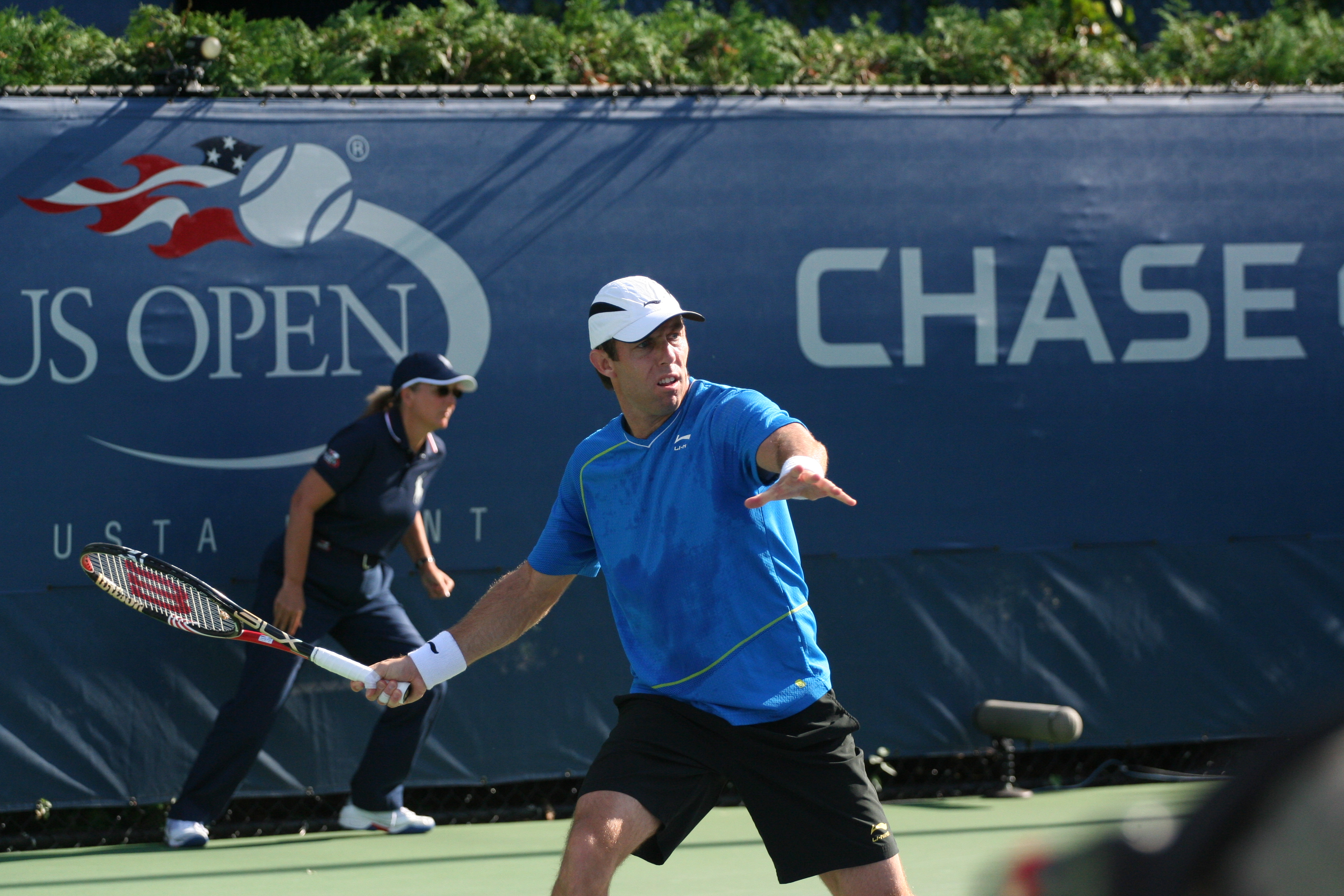
- Country (sports): Australia
- Residence: Loganlea, Australia
- Born: 12 November 1977 (age 48) Melbourne, Australia
- Height: 1.82 m (6 ft 0 in)
- Turned pro: 1997
- Retired: 21 August 2014
- Plays: Right-handed (one-handed backhand)
- Prize money: $2,834,776

Singles
- Career record: 0–3
- Career titles: 0
- Highest ranking: No. 395 (7 February 2000)

Doubles
- Career record: 447–314
- Career titles: 26
- Highest ranking: No. 5 (6 November 2006)

Grand Slam doubles results
- Australian Open: SF (2006, 2007)
- French Open: SF (2003)
- Wimbledon: SF (2004)
- US Open: SF (2006, 2007)

Grand Slam mixed doubles results
- Australian Open: F (2011)
- French Open: SF (2005)
- Wimbledon: F (2005)
- US Open: SF (2006)
Medal record
Men's tennis
Representing Australia
Commonwealth Games
Gold medal – first place	2010 Delhi	Men's Doubles
Silver medal – second place	2010 Delhi	Mixed Doubles
- Last updated on: 12 November 2013.

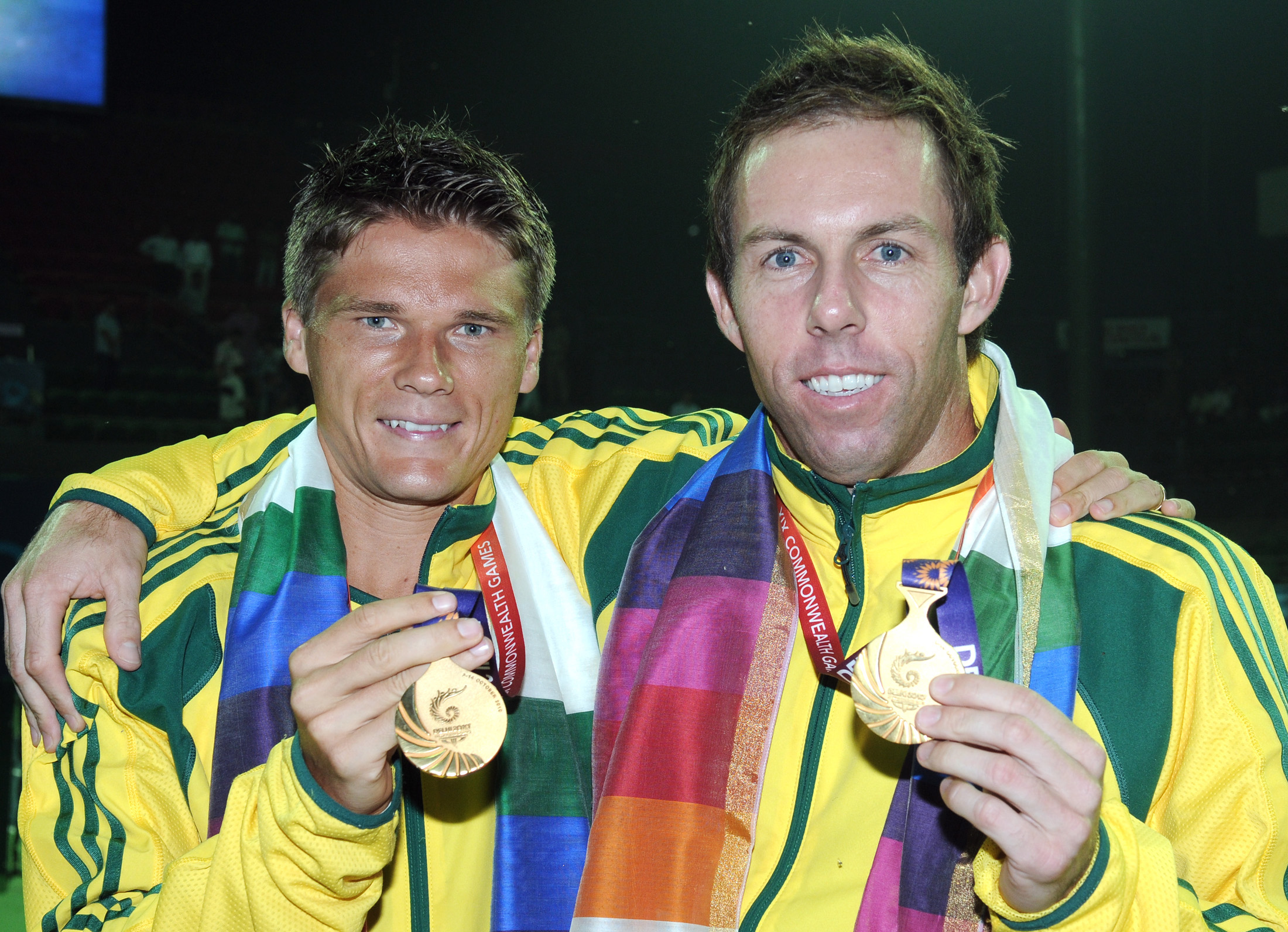
XIX Commonwealth Games-2010 Delhi Tennis (Men's Double) Paul Hanley (right) and Peter Luczak of Australia won the gold medal, at R K Khanna Tennis Stadium, in New Delhi on 9 October 2010

Paul Jason Hanley (born 12 November 1977) is a retired professional male tennis player from Australia, specialising in doubles and owning 26 ATP titles in this discipline.

He made the 2005 Wimbledon and 2011 Australian Open finals in mixed doubles, playing with Tatiana Perebiynis and Chan Yung-jan respectively, falling short on both occasions. His best results came alongside Wayne Arthurs and Kevin Ullyett, with whom Hanley formed long-term doubles partnerships. Hanley has an 8–4 win–loss record on the Australian Davis Cup Team. The Australian's highest doubles ranking was World Number 5. His parents, Jay and Judy, co-own a tennis centre, which is one of the main reasons why Hanley pursued a career in the sport.

== Grand Slam finals ==
=== Mixed doubles: 2 (0–2) ===
Result	Year	Championship	Surface	Partner	Opponents	Score
Loss	2005	Wimbledon	Grass	(Ukraine) Tatiana Perebiynis	(France) Mary Pierce (India) Mahesh Bhupathi	4–6, 2–6
Loss	2011	Australian Open	Hard	(Chinese Taipei) Chan Yung-jan	(Slovenia) Katarina Srebotnik (Canada) Daniel Nestor	3–6, 6–3, [7–10]

== ATP career finals ==
=== Doubles: 51 (26–25) ===
Legend Grand Slam Tournaments (0–0) ATP World Tour Finals (0–0) ATP World Tour Masters 1000 (3–6) ATP World Tour 500 Series (6–2) ATP World Tour 250 Series (17–17)	Titles by surface Hard (16–19) Clay (7–5) Grass (2–1) Carpet (1–0)

Result	No.	Date	Tournament	Surface	Partner	Opponents	Score
Loss	1.	Jun 2001	Nottingham Open, Nottingham, England	Grass	(Australia) Mark Kratzmann	(United States) Donald Johnson (United States) Jared Palmer	4–6, 2–6
Win	1.	Jul 2001	Orange Prokom Open, Sopot, Poland	Clay	(Australia) Nathan Healey	(Georgia (country)) Irakli Labadze (Hungary) Attila Sávolt	7–6^{(12–10)}, 6–2
Loss	2.	Oct 2001	Japan Open Tennis Championships, Tokyo, Japan	Hard	(Australia) Nathan Healey	(United States) Rick Leach (Australia) David Macpherson	5–7, 6–7^{(2–7)}
Loss	3.	Jul 2002	Swedish Open, Båstad, Sweden	Clay	(Australia) Michael Hill	(Sweden) Jonas Björkman (Australia) Todd Woodbridge	6–7^{(6–8)}, 4–6
Loss	4.	Oct 2002	Stockholm Open, Stockholm, Sweden	Hard (i)	(Australia) Wayne Arthurs	(Zimbabwe) Wayne Black (Zimbabwe) Kevin Ullyett	4–6, 6–2, 6–7^{(4–7)}
Win	2.	Jan 2003	Sydney International, Sydney, Australia (1)	Hard	(Australia) Nathan Healey	(India) Mahesh Bhupathi (Australia) Joshua Eagle	7–6^{(7–3)}, 6–4
Win	3.	Feb 2003	ABN AMRO World Tennis Tournament, Rotterdam, Netherlands (1)	Hard (i)	(Australia) Wayne Arthurs	(Switzerland) Roger Federer (Belarus) Max Mirnyi	7–6^{(7–4)}, 6–2
Win	4.	May 2003	Rome Masters, Rome, Italy	Clay	(Australia) Wayne Arthurs	(France) Michaël Llodra (France) Fabrice Santoro	7–5, 7–6^{(7–5)}
Loss	5.	Aug 2003	Legg Mason Tennis Classic, Washington, D.C., United States	Hard	(South Africa) Chris Haggard	(Russia) Yevgeny Kafelnikov (Armenia) Sargis Sargsian	5–7, 6–4, 2–6
Loss	6.	Aug 2003	Cincinnati Masters, Cincinnati, United States	Hard	(Australia) Wayne Arthurs	(United States) Bob Bryan (United States) Mike Bryan	6–7^{(3–7)}, 4–6
Win	5.	Sep 2003	Kingfisher Airlines Tennis Open, Shanghai, China	Hard	(Australia) Wayne Arthurs	(China) Zeng Shaoxuan (China) Zhu Benqiang	6–2, 6–4
Loss	7.	Oct 2003	Stockholm Open, Stockholm, Sweden	Hard (i)	(Australia) Wayne Arthurs	(Sweden) Jonas Björkman (Australia) Todd Woodbridge	3–6, 4–6
Win	6.	Nov 2003	Paris Masters, Paris, France	Carpet	(Australia) Wayne Arthurs	(France) Michaël Llodra (France) Fabrice Santoro	6–3, 1–6, 6–3
Win	7.	Feb 2004	ABN AMRO World Tennis Tournament, Rotterdam, Netherlands (2)	Hard (i)	(Czech Republic) Radek Štěpánek	(Israel) Jonathan Erlich (Israel) Andy Ram	5–7, 7–6^{(7–5)}, 7–5
Loss	8.	May 2004	Rome Masters, Rome, Italy	Clay	(Australia) Wayne Arthurs	(India) Mahesh Bhupathi (Belarus) Max Mirnyi	6–1, 4–6, 6–7^{(1–7)}
Win	8.	Jun 2004	Nottingham Open, Nottingham, England	Grass	(Australia) Todd Woodbridge	(United States) Rick Leach (United States) Brian MacPhie	6–4, 6–3
Loss	9.	Jul 2004	Countrywide Classic, Los Angeles, United States	Hard	(Australia) Wayne Arthurs	(United States) Bob Bryan (United States) Mike Bryan	3–6, 6–7^{(6–8)}
Loss	10.	Nov 2004	Stockholm Open, Stockholm, Sweden	Hard (i)	(Australia) Wayne Arthurs	(Spain) Feliciano López (Spain) Fernando Verdasco	4–6, 4–6
Win	9.	Feb 2005	SAP Open, San Jose, United States	Hard (i)	(Australia) Wayne Arthurs	(Switzerland) Yves Allegro (Germany) Michael Kohlmann	7–6^{(7–4)}, 6–4
Loss	11.	Feb 2005	Tennis Channel Open, Scottsdale, United States	Hard	(Australia) Wayne Arthurs	(United States) Bob Bryan (United States) Mike Bryan	5–7, 4–6
Loss	12.	Mar 2005	Indian Wells Masters, Indian Wells, United States	Hard	(Australia) Wayne Arthurs	(The Bahamas) Mark Knowles (Canada) Daniel Nestor	6–7^{(6–8)}, 6–7^{(2–7)}
Win	10.	May 2005	Hypo Group Tennis International, St. Poelten, Austria (1)	Clay	(Argentina) Lucas Arnold Ker	(Czech Republic) Martin Damm (Argentina) Mariano Hood	6–3, 6–4
Win	11.	Jul 2005	RCA Championships, Indianapolis, United States	Hard	(United States) Graydon Oliver	(Sweden) Simon Aspelin (Australia) Todd Perry	6–2, 3–1, ret.
Win	12.	Oct 2005	Thailand Open, Bangkok, Thailand	Hard (i)	(India) Leander Paes	(Israel) Jonathan Erlich (Israel) Andy Ram	6–7^{(5–7)}, 6–1, 6–2
Win	13.	Oct 2005	Stockholm Open, Stockholm, Sweden (1)	Hard (i)	(Australia) Wayne Arthurs	(India) Leander Paes (Serbia) Nenad Zimonjić	5–3, 5–3
Loss	13.	Jan 2006	ATP Adelaide, Adelaide, Australia	Hard	(Zimbabwe) Kevin Ullyett	(Israel) Jonathan Erlich (Israel) Andy Ram	6–7^{(4–7)}, 6–7^{(10–12)}
Win	14.	Feb 2006	ABN AMRO World Tennis Tournament, Rotterdam, Netherlands (3)	Hard (i)	(Zimbabwe) Kevin Ullyett	(Israel) Jonathan Erlich (Israel) Andy Ram	7–6^{(7–4)}, 7–6^{(7–2)}
Win	15.	Mar 2006	Dubai Tennis Championships, Dubai, UAE (1)	Hard	(Zimbabwe) Kevin Ullyett	(The Bahamas) Mark Knowles (Canada) Daniel Nestor	1–6, 6–2, [10–1]
Win	16.	May 2006	Hamburg Masters, Hamburg, Germany (1)	Clay	(Zimbabwe) Kevin Ullyett	(The Bahamas) Mark Knowles (Canada) Daniel Nestor	4–6, 7–6^{(7–5)}, [10–4]
Win	17.	May 2006	Hypo Group Tennis International, Poertschach, Austria (2)	Clay	(United States) Jim Thomas	(Austria) Oliver Marach (Czech Republic) Cyril Suk	6–3, 4–6, [10–5]
Win	18.	Jun 2006	Queen's Club Championships, London, England	Grass	(Zimbabwe) Kevin Ullyett	(Sweden) Jonas Björkman (Belarus) Max Mirnyi	6–4, 7–6^{(7–5)}
Loss	14.	Aug 2006	Legg Mason Tennis Classic, Washington, D.C., United States	Hard	(Zimbabwe) Kevin Ullyett	(United States) Bob Bryan (United States) Mike Bryan	3–6, 7–5, [3–10]
Loss	15.	Aug 2006	Canada Masters, Toronto, Canada	Hard	(Zimbabwe) Kevin Ullyett	(United States) Bob Bryan (United States) Mike Bryan	5–7, 1–6
Win	19.	Oct 2006	Stockholm Open, Stockholm, Sweden (2)	Hard (i)	(Zimbabwe) Kevin Ullyett	(Belgium) Olivier Rochus (Belgium) Kristof Vliegen	7–6^{(7–2)}, 6–4
Win	20.	Jan 2007	Sydney International, Sydney, Australia (2)	Hard	(Zimbabwe) Kevin Ullyett	(The Bahamas) Mark Knowles (Canada) Daniel Nestor	6–4, 6–7^{(3–7)}, [10–6]
Loss	16.	May 2007	Hamburg Masters, Hamburg, Germany	Clay	(Zimbabwe) Kevin Ullyett	(United States) Bob Bryan (United States) Mike Bryan	3–6, 6–3, [7–10]
Loss	17.	Aug 2007	Canada Masters, Montréal, Canada	Hard	(Zimbabwe) Kevin Ullyett	(India) Mahesh Bhupathi (Czech Republic) Pavel Vízner	4–6, 4–6
Win	21.	Mar 2008	PBZ Zagreb Indoors, Zagreb, Croatia	Hard (i)	(Australia) Jordan Kerr	(Germany) Christopher Kas (Netherlands) Rogier Wassen	6–3, 3–6, [10–8]
Loss	18.	Apr 2009	Grand Prix Hassan II, Casablanca, Morocco	Clay	(Sweden) Simon Aspelin	(Poland) Łukasz Kubot (Austria) Oliver Marach	6–7^{(4–7)}, 6–3, [6–10]
Win	22.	Jul 2009	Hamburg Masters, Hamburg, Germany (2)	Clay	(Sweden) Simon Aspelin	(Brazil) Marcelo Melo (Slovakia) Filip Polášek	6–3, 6–3
Loss	19.	Oct 2009	Stockholm Open, Stockholm, Sweden	Hard (i)	(Sweden) Simon Aspelin	(Brazil) Bruno Soares (Zimbabwe) Kevin Ullyett	4–6, 6–7^{(4–7)}
Loss	20.	Feb 2010	ABN AMRO World Tennis Tournament, Rotterdam, Netherlands	Hard (i)	(Sweden) Simon Aspelin	(Canada) Daniel Nestor (Serbia) Nenad Zimonjić	4–6, 6–4, [7–10]
Win	23.	Feb 2010	Dubai Tennis Championships, Dubai, UAE (2)	Hard	(Sweden) Simon Aspelin	(Czech Republic) Lukáš Dlouhý (India) Leander Paes	6–2, 6–3
Win	24.	Jan 2011	Brisbane International, Brisbane, Australia	Hard	(Czech Republic) Lukáš Dlouhý	(Sweden) Robert Lindstedt (Romania) Horia Tecău	6–4, ret.
Win	25.	Jan 2011	Sydney International, Sydney, Australia (3)	Hard	(Czech Republic) Lukáš Dlouhý	(United States) Bob Bryan (United States) Mike Bryan	6–7^{(6–8)}, 6–3, [10–5]
Loss	21.	Feb 2012	Open Sud de France, Montpellier, France	Hard (i)	(United Kingdom) Jamie Murray	(France) Nicolas Mahut (France) Édouard Roger-Vasselin	4–6, 6–7^{(4–7)}
Win	26.	Apr 2012	Grand Prix Hassan II, Casablanca, Morocco	Clay	(Germany) Dustin Brown	(Italy) Daniele Bracciali (Italy) Fabio Fognini	7–5, 6–3
Loss	22.	Jul 2012	Austrian Open Kitzbühel, Kitzbühel, Austria	Clay	(Germany) Dustin Brown	(Czech Republic) František Čermák (Austria) Julian Knowle	6–7^{(4–7)}, 6–3, [10–12]
Loss	23.	Sep 2012	PTT Thailand Open, Bangkok, Thailand	Hard (i)	(United States) Eric Butorac	(Chinese Taipei) Lu Yen-hsun (Thailand) Danai Udomchoke	3–6, 4–6
Loss	24.	Jan 2013	Brisbane International, Brisbane, Australia	Hard	(United States) Eric Butorac	(Brazil) Marcelo Melo (Spain) Tommy Robredo	6–4, 1–6, [5–10]
Loss	25.	Feb 2014	Open 13, Marseille, France	Hard (i)	(United Kingdom) Jonathan Marray	(France) Julien Benneteau (France) Édouard Roger-Vasselin	6–4, 6–7^{(6–8)}, [11–13]

== Doubles performance timeline ==
Key
W	F	SF	QF	#R	RR	Q#	DNQ	A	NH

(W) winner; (F) finalist; (SF) semifinalist; (QF) quarterfinalist; (#R) rounds 4, 3, 2, 1; (RR) round-robin stage; (Q#) qualification round; (DNQ) did not qualify; (A) absent; (NH) not held; (SR) strike rate (events won / competed); (W–L) win–loss record.

Tournament	1999	2000	2001	2002	2003	2004	2005	2006	2007	2008	2009	2010	2011	2012	2013	2014	SR	W–L
Grand Slam tournaments
Australian Open	1R	2R	2R	1R	1R	2R	2R	SF	SF	2R	3R	3R	1R	1R	3R	1R	0 / 16	19–16
French Open	A	A	2R	QF	SF	1R	QF	2R	2R	2R	3R	1R	3R	2R	A	A	0 / 12	18–12
Wimbledon	A	Q2	2R	1R	QF	SF	1R	QF	2R	1R	QF	2R	QF	1R	2R	1R	0 / 14	14–14
US Open	A	2R	1R	2R	QF	1R	3R	SF	SF	1R	1R	QF	3R	2R	1R	A	0 / 14	21–14
Win–loss	0–1	2–2	3–4	4–4	10–4	5–4	5–4	12–4	10–4	2–4	7–4	6–4	6–4	2–4	3–3	0–2	0 / 56	77–56
ATP Masters 1000 tournaments
Indian Wells	A	A	A	A	A	QF	F	1R	QF	QF	A	SF	QF	QF	QF	A	0 / 9	17–9
Miami	A	A	A	1R	1R	QF	1R	SF	QF	QF	A	2R	2R	1R	1R	A	0 / 11	11–11
Monte Carlo	A	A	A	A	QF	1R	SF	A	SF	2R	A	SF	1R	A	A	A	0 / 7	9–7
Rome	A	A	A	1R	W	F	2R	QF	QF	2R	A	2R	A	A	A	A	1 / 8	10–7
Madrid	A	A	A	A	1R	QF	QF	SF	2R	A	A	2R	A	A	A	A	0 / 6	3–6
Canada	A	A	A	1R	QF	2R	QF	F	F	SF	1R	2R	2R	QF	A	A	0 / 11	15–10
Cincinnati	A	A	A	1R	F	2R	2R	2R	QF	2R	A	1R	A	1R	A	A	0 / 9	5–9
Shanghai	Not Held										2R	2R	A	A	A	A	0 / 2	2–2
Paris	A	A	A	A	W	1R	QF	1R	QF	A	QF	1R	A	SF	A	A	1 / 8	11–7
Hamburg	A	A	A	1R	QF	QF	QF	W	F	2R	Not Masters 1000						1 / 7	10–6
Win–loss	0–0	0–0	0–0	0–5	16–6	9–9	10–8	12–7	14–9	9–7	3–3	8–9	4–4	7–5	2–2	0–0	3 / 78	94–74
Year-end ranking	210	112	62	53	10	14	13	7	10	54	28	27	41	36	66	227		
