= 2004 Western & Southern Financial Group Masters – Doubles =

Doubles
- 2004 Western & Southern Financial Group Masters

Final
- Champions: (The Bahamas) Mark Knowles (Canada) Daniel Nestor
- Runners-up: (Sweden) Jonas Björkman (Australia) Todd Woodbridge
- Score: 6–2, 3–6, 6–3

Events
Singles	Doubles
← 2003 ·	Western & Southern Financial Group Masters	· 2005 →

Bob and Mike Bryan were the defending champions, but lost in second round to Jonathan Erlich and Andy Ram.

Mark Knowles and Daniel Nestor won the title, defeating Jonas Björkman and Todd Woodbridge 6–2, 3–6, 6–3 in the final.

== Seeds ==
All seeds received a bye into the second round.

1. (Sweden) Jonas Björkman / (Australia) Todd Woodbridge (final)
2. (United States) Bob Bryan / (United States) Mike Bryan (second round)
3. (The Bahamas) Mark Knowles / (Canada) Daniel Nestor (champions)
4. (France) Michaël Llodra / (France) Fabrice Santoro (quarterfinals)
5. (Zimbabwe) Wayne Black / (Zimbabwe) Kevin Ullyett (second round)
6. (Australia) Wayne Arthurs / (Australia) Paul Hanley (second round)
7. (Czech Republic) Martin Damm / (Czech Republic) Cyril Suk (second round)
8. (India) Mahesh Bhupathi / (India) Leander Paes (quarterfinals)

== Draw ==
=== Key ===
- Q = Qualifier
- WC = Wild card
- LL = Lucky loser
- Alt = Alternate
- ITF = ITF entry
- PR = Protected ranking
- SR = Special ranking
- SE = Special exempt
- JE = Junior exempt
- JR = Junior Accelerator Programme entrant
- CO = College Accelerator Programme entrant
- NG = Next Gen Accelerator Program entrant
- w/o = Walkover
- r = Retired
- d = Defaulted

=== Finals ===
Semifinals
1	(Sweden) Jonas Björkman (Australia) Todd Woodbridge	6	6
(United States) Jared Palmer (Czech Republic) Pavel Vízner	3	4
3	(The Bahamas) Mark Knowles (Canada) Daniel Nestor	6	4	7^{9}
(Belarus) Max Mirnyi (Armenia) Sargis Sargsian	4	6	6^{7}

Final
1	(Sweden) Jonas Björkman (Australia) Todd Woodbridge	2	6	3
3	(The Bahamas) Mark Knowles (Canada) Daniel Nestor	6	3	6

=== Top half ===
First round
(Spain) F López (Spain) T Robredo	6	6
(Czech Republic) J Novák (Czech Republic) P Pála	3	2
(Austria) J Knowle (Serbia and Montenegro) N Zimonjić	6^{6}	5
(Chile) F González (Chile) N Massú	7^{8}	7
(France) A Clément (France) S Grosjean	7^{7}	4	2
(Germany) R Schüttler (Russia) M Youzhny	6^{4}	6	6
WC	(Australia) J Kerr (United States) J Thomas	6^{6}	7	3
(United States) J Palmer (Czech Republic) P Vízner	7^{8}	5	6

Second round
1	(Sweden) J Björkman (Australia) T Woodbridge	7	6
(Spain) F López (Spain) T Robredo	5	3
(Chile) F González (Chile) N Massú	6	3	6
7	(Czech Republic) M Damm (Czech Republic) C Suk	4	6	3
4	(France) M Llodra (France) F Santoro	6	7
(Germany) R Schüttler (Russia) M Youzhny	2	5
(United States) J Palmer (Czech Republic) P Vízner	6^{4}	7^{7}	7^{7}
6	(Australia) W Arthurs (Australia) P Hanley	7^{7}	6^{4}	6^{3}

Quarterfinals
1	(Sweden) J Björkman (Australia) T Woodbridge	6	6^{4}	7
(Chile) F González (Chile) N Massú	3	7^{7}	5
4	(France) M Llodra (France) F Santoro	1	3
(United States) J Palmer (Czech Republic) P Vízner	6	6

Semifinals
1	(Sweden) J Björkman (Australia) T Woodbridge	6	6
(United States) J Palmer (Czech Republic) P Vízner	3	4

=== Bottom half ===
First round
(Czech Republic) F Čermák (Czech Republic) L Friedl	6	3	7
(South Africa) C Haggard (Belgium) X Malisse	2	6	5
(Slovakia) D Hrbatý (Romania) A Pavel	6	3	7^{9}
(Argentina) G Etlis (Argentina) M Rodríguez	3	6	6^{7}
Alt	(United States) A Bogomolov Jr. (Russia) D Tursunov	4	3
(Belarus) M Mirnyi (Armenia) S Sargsian	6	6
WC	(United States) R Ginepri (United States) J Morrison	3	4
(Israel) J Erlich (Israel) A Ram	6	6

Second round
8	(India) M Bhupathi (India) L Paes	6^{6}	7^{7}	7
(Czech Republic) F Čermák (Czech Republic) L Friedl	7^{8}	6^{4}	5
(Slovakia) D Hrbatý (Romania) A Pavel	6	2	3
3	(The Bahamas) M Knowles (Canada) D Nestor	4	6	6
5	(Zimbabwe) W Black (Zimbabwe) K Ullyett	6^{5}	3
(Belarus) M Mirnyi (Armenia) S Sargsian	7^{7}	6
(Israel) J Erlich (Israel) A Ram	6	5	7
2	(United States) B Bryan (United States) M Bryan	4	7	5

Quarterfinals
8	(India) M Bhupathi (India) L Paes	3	4
3	(The Bahamas) M Knowles (Canada) D Nestor	6	6
(Belarus) M Mirnyi (Armenia) S Sargsian	7^{7}	6
(Israel) J Erlich (Israel) A Ram	6^{1}	3

Semifinals
3	(The Bahamas) M Knowles (Canada) D Nestor	6	4	7^{9}
(Belarus) M Mirnyi (Armenia) S Sargsian	4	6	6^{7}
