= 2005 Western & Southern Financial Group Masters – Singles =

Singles
- 2005 Western & Southern Financial Group Masters

Final
- Champion: (Switzerland) Roger Federer
- Runner-up: (United States) Andy Roddick
- Score: 6–3, 7–5

Details
- Draw: 64 (4WC/8Q/1LL/1SE/1PR)
- Seeds: 16

Events
Singles	Doubles
- Cincinnati Open

Roger Federer defeated Andy Roddick in the final, 6–3, 7–5 to win the men's singles tennis title at the 2005 Cincinnati Masters.

Andre Agassi was the reigning champion, but did not compete this year.

This was the first Masters tournament to feature future world No. 1's Novak Djokovic and Andy Murray; they lost in the first and second rounds, respectively. It was the first main draw Masters 1000 event for Djokovic.

== Seeds ==
1. (Switzerland) Roger Federer (champion)
2. (Spain) Rafael Nadal (first round)
3. (Australia) Lleyton Hewitt (semifinals)
4. (Russia) Marat Safin (quarterfinals)
5. (United States) Andy Roddick (final)
6. (Russia) Nikolay Davydenko (quarterfinals)
7. (United States) ~~Andre Agassi~~ (withdrew due to a back injury)
8. (Argentina) Gastón Gaudio (first round)
9. (Argentina) Guillermo Coria (second round)
10. (Argentina) Mariano Puerta (first round)
11. (Argentina) David Nalbandian (second round)
12. (United Kingdom) Tim Henman (second round)
13. (Sweden) Thomas Johansson (first round)
14. (Croatia) Ivan Ljubičić (first round)
15. (Czech Republic) Radek Štěpánek (first round)
16. (France) Richard Gasquet (second round)

== Draw ==
Key

- Q = Qualifier
- WC = Wild card
- LL = Lucky loser
- Alt = Alternate
- ITF = ITF entry
- PR = Protected ranking
- SR = Special ranking
- SE = Special exempt
- JE = Junior exempt
- JR = Junior Accelerator Programme entrant
- CO = College Accelerator Programme entrant
- NG = Next Gen Accelerator Program entrant
- w/o = Walkover
- r = Retired
- d = Defaulted

=== Finals ===
Quarterfinals
1	(Switzerland) Roger Federer	6	6
(Argentina) José Acasuso	4	3
4	(Russia) Marat Safin	2	3
WC	(United States) Robby Ginepri	6	6
6	(Russia) Nikolay Davydenko	2	3
3	(Australia) Lleyton Hewitt	6	6
5	(United States) Andy Roddick	2	6	6
(Russia) Mikhail Youzhny	6	3	4

Semifinals
1	(Switzerland) Roger Federer	4	7	6
WC	(United States) Robby Ginepri	6	5	4
3	(Australia) Lleyton Hewitt	4	6^{4}
5	(United States) Andy Roddick	6	7^{7}

Final
1	(Switzerland) Roger Federer	6	7
5	(United States) Andy Roddick	3	5

=== Top half ===
==== Section 1 ====
First round
1	(Switzerland) R Federer	7^{7}	7
WC	(United States) J Blake	6^{3}	5
(Germany) N Kiefer	6	6
Q	(Ecuador) N Lapentti	1	4
(Italy) F Volandri	6	3	1
(Belgium) O Rochus	4	6	6
(France) F Santoro	6^{4}	7^{9}	7
14	(Croatia) I Ljubičić	7^{7}	6^{7}	5
9	(Argentina) G Coria	6	6
(Thailand) P Srichaphan	4	2
Q	(Peru) L Horna	6	6
(Belgium) C Rochus	3	0
PR	(Morocco) Y El Aynaoui	3	2
(Argentina) J Acasuso	6	6
(Spain) T Robredo	2	6	6
8	(Argentina) G Gaudio	6	3	3

Second round
1	(Switzerland) R Federer	4	6	6
(Germany) N Kiefer	6	4	4
(Belgium) O Rochus	7	6
(France) F Santoro	5	3
9	(Argentina) G Coria	4	4
Q	(Peru) L Horna	6	6
(Argentina) J Acasuso	7^{8}	6
(Spain) T Robredo	6^{6}	2

Third round
1	(Switzerland) R Federer	6	6
(Belgium) O Rochus	3	4
Q	(Peru) L Horna	6^{5}	5
(Argentina) J Acasuso	7^{7}	7

Quarterfinals
1	(Switzerland) R Federer	6	6
(Argentina) J Acasuso	4	3

==== Section 2 ====
First round
4	(Russia) M Safin	7^{7}	6
Q	(Czech Republic) J Hernych	6^{3}	4
WC	(United Kingdom) A Murray	7^{7}	7^{7}
(United States) T Dent	6^{4}	6^{1}
(Belarus) M Mirnyi	2	4
(Sweden) R Söderling	6	6
(Slovakia) D Hrbatý	6	7
13	(Sweden) T Johansson	1	5
10	(Argentina) ~~M Puerta~~	6^{2}	1
WC	(United States) R Ginepri	7^{7}	6
Q	(South Africa) W Moodie	2	1
(Spain) D Ferrer	6	6
Q	(France) G Simon	2	6	6
(United States) V Spadea	6	2	3
(Spain) C Moyà	6	6
LL	(Belgium) X Malisse	4	4

Second round
4	(Russia) M Safin	6	1	6
WC	(United Kingdom) A Murray	4	6	1
(Sweden) R Söderling	4	6^{4}
(Slovakia) D Hrbatý	6	7^{7}
WC	(United States) R Ginepri	6	6
(Spain) D Ferrer	4	3
Q	(France) G Simon	6^{5}	5
(Spain) C Moyà	7^{7}	7

Third round
4	(Russia) M Safin	6	6
(Slovakia) D Hrbatý	0	3
WC	(United States) R Ginepri	6	6
(Spain) C Moyà	3	4

Quarterfinals
4	(Russia) M Safin	2	3
WC	(United States) R Ginepri	6	6

=== Bottom half ===
==== Section 3 ====
First round
6	(Russia) N Davydenko	7^{7}	7
(France) S Grosjean	6^{4}	5
SE	(France) P-H Mathieu	6	2	6
(Germany) T Haas	3	6	1
(Chile) F González	3	7^{9}	6
Q	(Serbia and Montenegro) N Djokovic	6	6^{7}	4
(Romania) A Pavel	2	6^{3}
11	(Argentina) D Nalbandian	6	7^{7}
16	(France) R Gasquet	7	4	6
(Spain) F López	5	6	1
(Croatia) M Ančić	6	6
(Brazil) R Mello	2	3
Q	(Russia) D Tursunov	6	5	4
(United Kingdom) G Rusedski	4	7	6
(Russia) I Andreev	3	4
3	(Australia) L Hewitt	6	6

Second round
6	(Russia) N Davydenko	6	6
SE	(France) P-H Mathieu	2	2
(Chile) F González	3	6	6
11	(Argentina) D Nalbandian	6	1	2
16	(France) R Gasquet	4	6^{4}
(Croatia) M Ančić	6	7^{7}
(United Kingdom) G Rusedski	6	5	4
3	(Australia) L Hewitt	1	7	6

Third round
6	(Russia) N Davydenko	6	6
(Chile) F González	3	4
(Croatia) M Ančić	1	4
3	(Australia) L Hewitt	6	6

Quarterfinals
6	(Russia) N Davydenko	2	3
3	(Australia) L Hewitt	6	6

==== Section 4 ====
First round
5	(United States) A Roddick	6	6
(Austria) J Melzer	3	4
Q	(Austria) S Koubek	6	3	2
(Spain) J C Ferrero	0	6	6
(Spain) A Martín	6^{4r}
(Argentina) J I Chela	6^{4}
(Chile) N Massú	2	1
12	(United Kingdom) T Henman	6	6
15	(Czech Republic) R Štěpánek	3	2
WC	(France) G Monfils	6	6
(Czech Republic) J Novák	4	3
(Slovakia) K Beck	6	6
(Russia) M Youzhny	6	3	7^{7}
(France) C Saulnier	2	6	6^{4}
(Czech Republic) T Berdych	6^{4}	6	7^{7}
2	(Spain) R Nadal	7^{7}	2	6^{3}

Second round
5	(United States) A Roddick	6^{3}	7^{7}	6
(Spain) J C Ferrero	7^{7}	6^{5}	2
(Argentina) J I Chela	6	6
12	(United Kingdom) T Henman	4	4
WC	(France) G Monfils	6	7^{8}
(Slovakia) K Beck	1	6^{6}
(Russia) M Youzhny	4	7^{7}	7^{7}
(Czech Republic) T Berdych	6	6^{4}	6^{3}

Third round
5	(United States) A Roddick	7^{7}	6
(Argentina) J I Chela	6^{4}	2
WC	(France) G Monfils	6	1	1
(Russia) M Youzhny	4	6	6

Quarterfinals
5	(United States) A Roddick	2	6	6
(Russia) M Youzhny	6	3	4

== Qualifying ==
=== Qualifying seeds ===
1. (Romania) Victor Hănescu (first round)
2. (Denmark) Kenneth Carlsen (first round)
3. (Italy) Davide Sanguinetti (first round)
4. (Switzerland) Stanislas Wawrinka (first round)
5. (Belgium) Xavier Malisse (qualifying competition, lucky loser)
6. (Luxembourg) Gilles Müller (first round)
7. (Czech Republic) Tomáš Zíb (qualifying competition)
8. (Peru) Luis Horna (qualified)
9. (Italy) Andreas Seppi (first round)
10. (France) Michaël Llodra (first round)
11. (United States) Kevin Kim (first round)
12. (Czech Republic) Ivo Minář (first round)
13. (Croatia) Ivo Karlović (first round)
14. (Czech Republic) Jan Hernych (qualified)
15. (Ecuador) Nicolás Lapentti (qualified)
16. (Austria) Stefan Koubek (qualified)

=== Qualifiers ===
1. (France) Gilles Simon
2. (Russia) Dmitry Tursunov
3. (South Africa) Wesley Moodie
4. (Austria) Stefan Koubek
5. (Ecuador) Nicolás Lapentti
6. (Czech Republic) Jan Hernych
7. (Serbia and Montenegro) Novak Djokovic
8. (Peru) Luis Horna

=== Lucky loser ===
1. (Belgium) Xavier Malisse (replaced Andre Agassi)

=== Special exempt ===
1. (France) Paul-Henri Mathieu (reached the semifinals at Montreal)

=== Qualifying draw ===
==== First qualifier ====
First round
1	(Romania) Victor Hănescu	5	2
(France) Florent Serra	7	6
Alt	(France) Gilles Simon	3	7^{7}	6
13	(Croatia) Ivo Karlović	6	6^{5}	4

Qualifying competition
(France) Florent Serra	3	7^{7}	3
Alt	(France) Gilles Simon	6	6^{4}	6

==== Second qualifier ====
First round
2	(Denmark) Kenneth Carlsen	6^{2}	6	2
(United States) Justin Gimelstob	7^{7}	1	6
(Russia) Dmitry Tursunov	6	6
12	(Czech Republic) Ivo Minář	1	3

Qualifying competition
(United States) Justin Gimelstob	3	4
(Russia) Dmitry Tursunov	6	6

==== Third qualifier ====
First round
3	(Italy) Davide Sanguinetti	4	1
(Spain) Guillermo García López	6	6
(South Africa) Wesley Moodie	7^{7}	6
9	(Italy) Andreas Seppi	6^{4}	3

Qualifying competition
(Spain) Guillermo García López	1	4
(South Africa) Wesley Moodie	6	6

==== Fourth qualifier ====
First round
4	(Switzerland) Stanislas Wawrinka	2	6	2
Alt	(Ecuador) Giovanni Lapentti	6	4	6
WC	(United States) Jeff Morrison	6^{5}	7	4
16	(Austria) Stefan Koubek	7^{7}	5	6

Qualifying competition
Alt	(Ecuador) Giovanni Lapentti	3	4
16	(Austria) Stefan Koubek	6	6

==== Fifth qualifier ====
First round
5	(Belgium) Xavier Malisse	6	6
(Germany) Lars Burgsmüller	2	4
WC	(United States) Phillip Simmonds	2	3
15	(Ecuador) Nicolás Lapentti	6	6

Qualifying competition
5	(Belgium) Xavier Malisse	4	3
15	(Ecuador) Nicolás Lapentti	6	6

==== Sixth qualifier ====
First round
6	(Luxembourg) Gilles Müller	7^{7}	3	2
WC	(United States) Rajeev Ram	6^{3}	6	6
(Serbia and Montenegro) Janko Tipsarević	0	1
14	(Czech Republic) Jan Hernych	6	6

Qualifying competition
WC	(United States) Rajeev Ram	6^{4}	3
14	(Czech Republic) Jan Hernych	7^{7}	6

==== Seventh qualifier ====
First round
7	(Czech Republic) Tomáš Zíb	6	6
WC	(United States) Jan-Michael Gambill	4	2
(Serbia and Montenegro) Novak Djokovic	6	6
11	(United States) Kevin Kim	3	3

Qualifying competition
7	(Czech Republic) Tomáš Zíb	6	5	4
(Serbia and Montenegro) Novak Djokovic	4	7	6

==== Eighth qualifier ====
First round
8	(Peru) Luis Horna	6	6
(Australia) Wayne Arthurs	4	3
(France) Arnaud Clément	6	6
10	(France) Michaël Llodra	4	0

Qualifying competition
8	(Peru) Luis Horna	7^{7}	6
(France) Arnaud Clément	6^{4}	4
