= Stacia Fonseca =

American tennis player

- Country (sports): United States
- Born: September 21, 1985 (age 40) Springfield, Massachusetts, U.S.
- Height: 178 cm (5 ft 10 in)
- Plays: Right-handed
- Prize money: $33,342

Singles
- Career record: 72–111
- Highest ranking: No. 501 (Jun 12, 2006)

Doubles
- Career record: 41–53
- Career titles: 1 ITF
- Highest ranking: No. 292 (Sep 19, 2005)

Stacia Fonseca (born September 21, 1985) is an American former professional tennis player.

The daughter of a minister, Fonseca was born in Springfield, Massachusetts, but grew up in Connecticut and Florida.

Fonseca made all of her WTA Tour main draw appearances in doubles and reached the quarter-finals at Cincinnati in 2005. Her only ITF title came in the doubles at the 2007 Hilton Head event.

== ITF finals ==
=== Singles: 1 (0–1) ===
Outcome	Date	Tournament	Surface	Opponent	Score
Runner-up	August 5, 2007	St. Joseph, United States	Hard	(Croatia) Jelena Pandžić	3–6, 1–6

=== Doubles: 1 (1–0) ===
Outcome	Date	Tournament	Surface	Partner	Opponents	Score
Winner	June 10, 2007	Hilton Head, United States	Hard	(United States) Alexandra Mueller	(Japan) Ryōko Fuda (United States) Mami Inoue	6–3, 6–2
