= Akiko Morigami =

Japanese tennis player (born 1980)

Akiko Morigami 森上亜希子
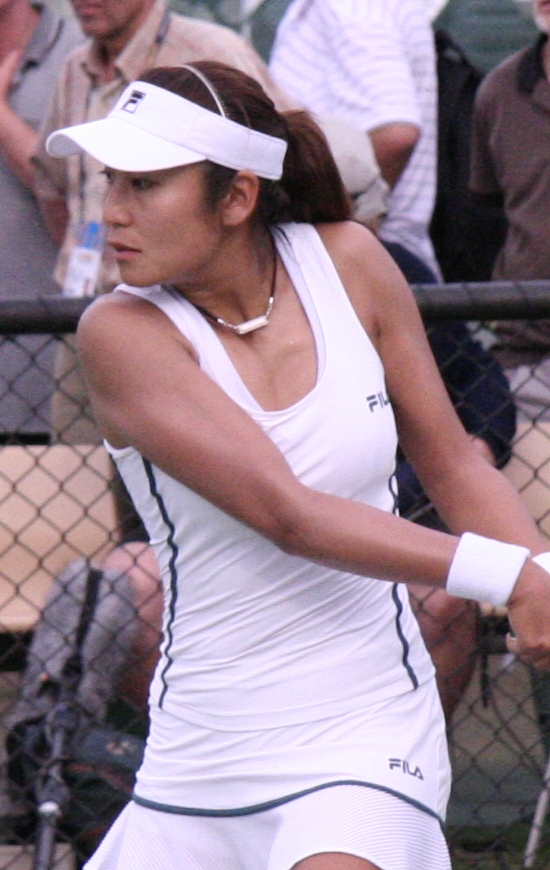
- At the 2007 Australian Open
- Country (sports): Japan
- Born: 12 January 1980 (age 46) Osaka, Japan
- Height: 1.65 m (5 ft 5 in)
- Turned pro: January 1998
- Retired: 2009
- Plays: Right-handed (two-handed backhand)
- Prize money: $1,177,175

Singles
- Career record: 286–243
- Career titles: 1 WTA, 7 ITF
- Highest ranking: No. 41 (15 August 2005)

Grand Slam singles results
- Australian Open: 2R (2003, 2004, 2007, 2008)
- French Open: 3R (2005)
- Wimbledon: 3R (2003, 2007)
- US Open: 2R (2004)

Doubles
- Career record: 60–95
- Career titles: 1 WTA, 3 ITF
- Highest ranking: No. 59 (30 July 2007)

Grand Slam doubles results
- Australian Open: 1R (2004, 2007, 2008)
- French Open: 3R (2007)
- Wimbledon: 2R (2005, 2007)
- US Open: 3R (2006, 2007)

Team competitions
- Fed Cup: 18–5

Akiko Morigami (森上 亜希子, Morigami Akiko; born 12 January 1980) is a Japanese former tennis player..She turned professional in 1998. On 15 August 2005, she reached her career-high singles ranking of world No. 41.

Morigami won one singles title in her career at the Prague Open, defeating top seed Marion Bartoli in the final. She reached two other singles finals, both at the Cincinnati Open (falling to Patty Schnyder in 2005, and losing to Anna Chakvetadze in 2007.) At the 2006 French Open, she upset then world No. 3, Nadia Petrova, in the first round.

Morigami retired from professional tennis after losing in the quarterfinals at the All Japan Championships in November 2009.

== WTA Tour finals ==
Legend
Grand Slam tournaments
Tier I
Tier II
Tier III
Tier IV & V

=== Singles: 3 (1 title, 2 runner-ups) ===
Result	Date	Tournament	Surface	Opponent	Score
Loss	Jul 2005	Cincinnati Open, United States	Hard	(Switzerland) Patty Schnyder	4–6, 0–6
Win	May 2007	Prague Open, Czech Republic	Clay	(France) Marion Bartoli	6–1, 6–3
Loss	Jul 2007	Cincinnati Open, United States	Hard	(Russia) Anna Chakvetadze	1–6, 3–6

=== Doubles: 2 (1 title, 1 runner-up) ===
Result	Date	Tournament	Surface	Partner	Opponents	Score
Win	Feb 2003	Memphis Indoors, US	Hard (i)	(Japan) Saori Obata	(Russia) Alina Jidkova (Australia) Bryanne Stewart	6–1, 6–1
Loss	Feb 2007	Memphis Indoors, US	Hard (i)	(Australia) Jarmila Gajdošová	(Australia) Nicole Pratt (Australia) Bryanne Stewart	5–7, 6–4, [5–10]

== ITF Circuit finals ==
Legend
$75,000 tournaments
$50,000 tournaments
$25,000 tournaments
$10,000 tournaments

=== Singles (7–4) ===
Result	No.	Date	Tournament	Surface	Opponent	Score
Loss	1.	13 October 1996	ITF Kugayama, Japan	Hard	(Japan) Shinobu Asagoe	1–6, 6–3, 1–6
Loss	2.	30 August 1999	ITF Kuroshio, Japan	Hard	(Australia) Kerry-Anne Guse	4–6, 3–6
Win	1.	12 March 2000	ITF Warrnambool, Australia	Grass	(Australia) Mireille Dittmann	6–4, 5–7, 6–1
Win	2.	26 March 2000	ITF Wodonga, Australia	Grass	(South Africa) Mareze Joubert	6–1, 6–1
Win	3.	14 October 2001	ITF Saga, Japan	Grass	(Japan) Nana Miyagi	6–4, 7–5
Win	4.	28 October 2001	ITF Home Hill, Australia	Hard	(Australia) Mireille Dittmann	0–6, 6–4, 6–1
Win	5.	27 April 2003	Dothan Pro Classic, United States	Clay	(Venezuela) Milagros Sequera	6–3, 6–4
Win	6.	6 June 2004	Surbiton Trophy, United Kingdom	Grass	(Russia) Anna Chakvetadze	6–4, 1–6, 6–1
Loss	3.	22 February 2005	ITF Saint Paul, United States	Hard (i)	(United States) Laura Granville	2–6, 7–6, 2–6
Loss	4	7 February 2007	Las Vegas Open, United States	Hard	(Denmark) Caroline Wozniacki	3–6, 2–6
Win	7.	4 November 2007	ITF Taoyuan, Taiwan	Hard	(Belgium) Yanina Wickmayer	6–4, 7–6^{(5)}

=== Doubles (3–0) ===
Result	No.	Date	Tournament	Surface	Partner	Opponents	Score
Win	1.	11 June 2001	ITF Tallinn, Estonia	Clay	(Japan) Miho Saeki	(Russia) Natalia Egorova (Russia) Ekaterina Sysoeva	6–2, 7–6^{(7)}
Win	2.	26 May 2002	ITF Tallinn, Estonia	Clay	(Japan) Saori Obata	(United States) Teryn Ashley (United States) Kristen Schlukebir	7–5, 7–6^{(2)}
Win	3.	9 June 2006	ITF Prostějov, Czech Republic	Clay	(Australia) Jarmila Wolfe	(Latvia) Līga Dekmeijere (Poland) Alicja Rosolska	6–3, 7–6^{(3)}
