= 2011 Sony Ericsson Open – Men's doubles =

Men's doubles
- 2011 Sony Ericsson Open

Final
- Champions: (India) Mahesh Bhupathi (India) Leander Paes
- Runners-up: (Belarus) Max Mirnyi (Canada) Daniel Nestor
- Score: 6–7(5), 6–2, [10–5]

Events
Singles	men	women
Doubles	men	women
← 2010 ·	Sony Ericsson Open	· 2012 →

Lukáš Dlouhý and Leander Paes were the defending champions, but chose not to participate together.
Dlouhý competed together with Paul Hanley, however they lost to Jürgen Melzer and Philipp Petzschner in the second round.
Paes partnered up with Mahesh Bhupathi and they won this tournament, defeating Max Mirnyi and Daniel Nestor 6–7(5), 6–2, [10–5] in the final.

== Seeds ==
1. (United States) Bob Bryan / (United States) Mike Bryan (second round)
2. (Belarus) Max Mirnyi / (Canada) Daniel Nestor (final)
3. (India) Mahesh Bhupathi / (India) Leander Paes (champions)
4. (Austria) Jürgen Melzer / (Germany) Philipp Petzschner (semifinals)
5. (Poland) Mariusz Fyrstenberg / (Poland) Marcin Matkowski (first round)
6. (France) Michaël Llodra / (Serbia) Nenad Zimonjić (quarterfinals)
7. (India) Rohan Bopanna / (Pakistan) Aisam-ul-Haq Qureshi (quarterfinals)
8. (Sweden) Robert Lindstedt / (Romania) Horia Tecău (quarterfinals)

== Draw ==
=== Key ===
- Q = Qualifier
- WC = Wild card
- LL = Lucky loser
- Alt = Alternate
- SE = Special exempt
- PR = Protected ranking
- ITF = ITF entry
- JE = Junior exempt
- w/o = Walkover
- r = Retired
- d = Defaulted
- SR = Special ranking

=== Finals ===
Semifinals
(Austria) Oliver Marach (Serbia) Janko Tipsarević	3	7	[9]
3	(India) Mahesh Bhupathi (India) Leander Paes	6	5	[11]
4	(Austria) Jürgen Melzer (Germany) Philipp Petzschner	4	1
2	(Belarus) Max Mirnyi (Canada) Daniel Nestor	6	6

Final
3	(India) Mahesh Bhupathi (India) Leander Paes	6^{5}	6	[10]
2	(Belarus) Max Mirnyi (Canada) Daniel Nestor	7	2	[5]

=== Top half ===
First round
1	(United States) B Bryan (United States) M Bryan	6	6
WC	(United States) R Harrison (United States) J Sock	1	0
(Austria) O Marach (Serbia) J Tipsarević	6^{7}	6	[10]
Alt	(Spain) P Andújar (Argentina) C Berlocq	7	4	[8]
(Spain) G García-López (Spain) A Montañes	6	6^{5}	[8]
(Slovakia) M Mertiňák (Belgium) D Norman	4	7	[10]
(Germany) P Kohlschreiber (United States) R Ram	3	6^{5}
7	(India) R Bopanna (Pakistan) A-u-H Qureshi	6	7
3	(India) M Bhupathi (India) L Paes	6	6
(United States) E Butorac (Curaçao) J-J Rojer	2	3
(Spain) M López (Spain) D Marrero	6	6
(Kazakhstan) A Golubev (Uzbekistan) D Istomin	2	4
(Belgium) X Malisse (United Kingdom) J Murray	7	6
(Chinese Taipei) Y-h Lu (Germany) F Mayer	6^{1}	4
(Argentina) JI Chela (Argentina) J Mónaco	6	1	[4]
6	(France) M Llodra (Serbia) N Zimonjić	3	6	[10]

Second round
1	(United States) B Bryan (United States) M Bryan	5	4
(Austria) O Marach (Serbia) J Tipsarević	7	6
(Slovakia) M Mertiňák (Belgium) D Norman	6^{4}	6	[8]
7	(India) R Bopanna (Pakistan) A-u-H Qureshi	7	3	[10]
3	(India) M Bhupathi (India) L Paes	7	6
(Spain) M López (Spain) D Marrero	6^{5}	4
(Belgium) X Malisse (United Kingdom) J Murray	7	3	[5]
6	(France) M Llodra (Serbia) N Zimonjić	6^{4}	6	[10]

Quarterfinals
(Austria) O Marach (Serbia) J Tipsarević	6	7
7	(India) R Bopanna (Pakistan) A-u-H Qureshi	4	6^{8}
3	(India) M Bhupathi (India) L Paes	6	6^{4}	[10]
6	(France) M Llodra (Serbia) N Zimonjić	3	7	[7]

Semifinals
(Austria) O Marach (Serbia) J Tipsarević	3	7	[9]
3	(India) M Bhupathi (India) L Paes	6	5	[11]

=== Bottom half ===
First round
5	(Poland) M Fyrstenberg (Poland) M Matkowski	5	4
(Israel) J Erlich (Israel) A Ram	7	6
(South Africa) K Anderson (Croatia) I Karlović	3	3
(Croatia) M Čilić (Croatia) I Ljubičić	6	6
(Czech Republic) L Dlouhý (Australia) P Hanley	6	3	[10]
(Brazil) M Melo (Brazil) B Soares	4	6	[8]
WC	(Japan) K Nishikori (United States) D Young	2	3
4	(Austria) J Melzer (Germany) P Petzschner	6	6
8	(Sweden) R Lindstedt (Romania) H Tecău	6	6
(Sweden) S Aspelin (Austria) J Knowle	2	2
(United States) J Isner (United States) S Querrey	4	6	[10]
(Uruguay) P Cuevas (Spain) M Granollers	6	4	[7]
(Ukraine) S Stakhovsky (Russia) M Youzhny	5	6	[10]
(Serbia) N Djokovic (United Kingdom) A Murray	7	3	[8]
(Spain) F López (Spain) F Verdasco	7	4	[7]
2	(Belarus) M Mirnyi (Canada) D Nestor	6^{4}	6	[10]

Second round
(Israel) J Erlich (Israel) A Ram	6	7
(Croatia) M Čilić (Croatia) I Ljubičić	3	6^{5}
(Czech Republic) L Dlouhý (Australia) P Hanley	2	6	[6]
4	(Austria) J Melzer (Germany) P Petzschner	6	4	[10]
8	(Sweden) R Lindstedt (Romania) H Tecău	6	6
(United States) J Isner (United States) S Querrey	4	4
(Ukraine) S Stakhovsky (Russia) M Youzhny	4	1
2	(Belarus) M Mirnyi (Canada) D Nestor	6	6

Quarterfinals
(Israel) J Erlich (Israel) A Ram	6	4	[8]
4	(Austria) J Melzer (Germany) P Petzschner	4	6	[10]
8	(Sweden) R Lindstedt (Romania) H Tecău	5	0
2	(Belarus) M Mirnyi (Canada) D Nestor	7	6

Semifinals
4	(Austria) J Melzer (Germany) P Petzschner	4	1
2	(Belarus) M Mirnyi (Canada) D Nestor	6	6
