= 2009 Western & Southern Financial Group Masters – Singles =

Singles
- 2009 Western & Southern Financial Group Masters

Final
- Champion: (Switzerland) Roger Federer
- Runner-up: (Serbia) Novak Djokovic
- Score: 6–1, 7–5

Details
- Draw: 56
- Seeds: 16

Events
Singles	Doubles
← 2008 ·	Western & Southern Financial Group Masters	· 2010 →

Roger Federer defeated Novak Djokovic in the final, 6–1, 7–5 to win the men's singles tennis title at the 2009 Cincinnati Masters.

Andy Murray was the defending champion, but lost in the semifinals to Federer.

== Seeds ==
The top eight seeds receive a bye into the second round.

1. (Switzerland) Roger Federer (champion)
2. (Spain) Rafael Nadal (semifinals)
3. (United Kingdom) Andy Murray (semifinals)
4. (Serbia) Novak Djokovic (final)
5. (United States) Andy Roddick (second round)
6. (Argentina) ~~Juan Martín del Potro~~ (withdrew due to fatigue)
7. (France) Jo-Wilfried Tsonga (second round)
8. (Russia) Nikolay Davydenko (third round)
9. (France) Gilles Simon (quarterfinals)
10. (Chile) Fernando González (first round, retired)
11. (Spain) Fernando Verdasco (first round)
12. (Sweden) Robin Söderling (first round)
13. (France) Gaël Monfils (first round)
14. (Croatia) Marin Čilić (second round)
15. (Spain) Tommy Robredo (first round)
16. (Czech Republic) Radek Štěpánek (third round)

== Main draw ==
=== Key ===
- Q = Qualifier
- WC = Wild card
- LL = Lucky loser
- Alt = Alternate
- ITF = ITF entry
- PR = Protected ranking
- SR = Special ranking
- SE = Special exempt
- JE = Junior exempt
- JR = Junior Accelerator Programme entrant
- CO = College Accelerator Programme entrant
- NG = Next Gen Accelerator Program entrant
- w/o = Walkover
- r = Retired
- d = Defaulted

=== Finals ===
Quarterfinals
1	(Switzerland) Roger Federer	6	6
(Australia) Lleyton Hewitt	3	4
3	(United Kingdom) Andy Murray	4	6	6
LL	(France) Julien Benneteau	6	3	1
9	(France) Gilles Simon	4	5
4	(Serbia) Novak Djokovic	6	7
(Czech Republic) Tomáš Berdych	4	5
2	(Spain) Rafael Nadal	6	7

Semifinals
1	(Switzerland) Roger Federer	6	7^{10}
3	(United Kingdom) Andy Murray	2	6^{8}
4	(Serbia) Novak Djokovic	6	6
2	(Spain) Rafael Nadal	1	4

Final
1	(Switzerland) Roger Federer	6	7
4	(Serbia) Novak Djokovic	1	5

=== Top half ===
==== Section 1 ====
First round
(Argentina) J Acasuso	6	6
Q	(Poland) Ł Kubot	4	3
(Spain) D Ferrer	7	6
(Switzerland) S Wawrinka	5	2
(Spain) JC Ferrero	3	4
14	(Croatia) M Čilić	6	6
12	(Sweden) R Söderling	6	6^{8}	4
(Australia) L Hewitt	3	7^{10}	6
(Argentina) M Vassallo Argüello	3	3
(Germany) B Becker	6	6
Q	(Chinese Taipei) Y-h Lu	3	4
(United States) S Querrey	6	6

Second round
1	(Switzerland) R Federer	6	7
(Argentina) J Acasuso	3	5
(Spain) D Ferrer	7^{7}	6
14	(Croatia) M Čilić	6^{4}	2
(Australia) L Hewitt	6	6
(Germany) B Becker	3	3
(United States) S Querrey	7^{13}	7^{7}
5	(United States) A Roddick	6^{11}	6^{3}

Third round
1	(Switzerland) R Federer	3	6	6
(Spain) D Ferrer	6	3	4
(Australia) L Hewitt	6	2	6
(United States) S Querrey	1	6	3

Quarterfinals
1	(Switzerland) R Federer	6	6
(Australia) L Hewitt	3	4

==== Section 2 ====
First round
(Spain) N Almagro	6	1
(Israel) D Sela	4	0^{r}
WC	(Russia) M Safin	7	7^{7}
WC	(United States) R Ginepri	5	6^{2}
(Serbia) V Troicki	6^{2}	0^{r}
16	(Czech Republic) R Štěpánek	7^{7}	1
11	(Spain) F Verdasco	6^{4}	6^{4}
(Spain) G García López	7^{7}	7^{7}
(Romania) V Hănescu	5	2
Q	(Russia) M Youzhny	7	6
(Spain) F López	7	6^{4}	6^{7}
(Austria) J Melzer	5	7^{7}	7^{9}

Second round
3	(United Kingdom) A Murray	7^{7}	6
(Spain) N Almagro	6^{3}	2
WC	(Russia) M Safin	6	3	1
16	(Czech Republic) R Štěpánek	4	6	6
(Spain) G García López	7	6
Q	(Russia) M Youzhny	5	3
(Austria) J Melzer	2	6	2
LL	(France) J Benneteau	6	3	6

Third round
3	(United Kingdom) A Murray	6	6
16	(Czech Republic) R Štěpánek	4	1
(Spain) G García López	6	4	6^{4}
LL	(France) J Benneteau	4	6	7^{7}

Quarterfinals
3	(United Kingdom) A Murray	4	6	6
LL	(France) J Benneteau	6	3	1

=== Bottom half ===
==== Section 3 ====
First round
(United States) J Blake	6^{5}	7^{7}	4
(Russia) I Kunitsyn	7^{7}	6^{5}	6
(Russia) I Andreev	6	7
(Germany) N Kiefer	1	5
WC	(United States) W Odesnik	3	2
9	(France) G Simon	6	6
15	(Spain) T Robredo	3	5
(France) J Chardy	6	7
WC	(United States) J Isner	7^{7}	5	7^{7}
(Germany) T Haas	6^{5}	7	6^{3}
Q	(Croatia) I Ljubičić	4	6	6
(France) F Serra	6	3	4

Second round
8	(Russia) N Davydenko	6	1	6
(Russia) I Kunitsyn	2	6	3
(Russia) I Andreev	6^{5}	7^{8}	1
9	(France) G Simon	7^{7}	6^{6}	6
(France) J Chardy	6^{1}	6	4
WC	(United States) J Isner	7^{7}	3	1^{r}
Q	(Croatia) I Ljubičić	6^{5}	4
4	(Serbia) N Djokovic	7^{7}	6

Third round
8	(Russia) N Davydenko	7^{8}	4	4
9	(France) G Simon	6^{6}	6	6
(France) J Chardy	5	3
4	(Serbia) N Djokovic	7	6

Quarterfinals
9	(France) G Simon	4	5
4	(Serbia) N Djokovic	6	7

==== Section 4 ====
First round
(Germany) P Kohlschreiber	5	6	3
Q	(Australia) C Guccione	7	2	6
Q	(Italy) S Bolelli	6^{6}	3
(Germany) P Petzschner	7^{8}	6
(Czech Republic) T Berdych	6
10	(Chile) F González	4	r
13	(France) G Monfils	4	7^{7}	6^{2}
(Croatia) I Karlović	6	6^{5}	7^{7}
(Germany) M Zverev	7^{7}	5	3
(France) P-H Mathieu	6^{4}	7	6
Q	(Czech Republic) J Hernych	6	4	1
(Italy) A Seppi	3	6	6

Second round
7	(France) J-W Tsonga	6^{12}	2
Q	(Australia) C Guccione	7^{14}	6
(Germany) P Petzschner	6^{8}	7^{9}	4
(Czech Republic) T Berdych	7^{10}	6^{7}	6
(Croatia) I Karlović	6^{9}	4
(France) P-H Mathieu	7^{11}	6
(Italy) A Seppi	6^{4}	6^{3}
2	(Spain) R Nadal	7^{7}	7^{7}

Third round
Q	(Australia) C Guccione	4	3
(Czech Republic) T Berdych	6	6
(France) P-H Mathieu	5	2
2	(Spain) R Nadal	7	6

Quarterfinals
(Czech Republic) T Berdych	4	5
2	(Spain) R Nadal	6	7

== Qualifying ==
=== Seeds ===
1. (Croatia) Ivan Ljubičić (qualified)
2. (France) Julien Benneteau (qualifying competition, lucky loser)
3. (Chinese Taipei) Lu Yen-hsun (qualified)
4. (Russia) Mikhail Youzhny (qualified)
5. (Kazakhstan) Andrey Golubev (first round)
6. (Italy) Simone Bolelli (qualified)
7. (Uzbekistan) Denis Istomin (qualifying competition)
8. (United States) Robert Kendrick (first round)
9. (Russia) Teymuraz Gabashvili (first round)
10. (Czech Republic) Jan Hernych (qualified)
11. (Germany) Rainer Schüttler (qualifying competition)
12. (France) Adrian Mannarino (qualifying competition)
13. (Latvia) Ernests Gulbis (first round)
14. (United States) Kevin Kim (qualifying competition)

=== Qualifiers ===
1. (Croatia) Ivan Ljubičić
2. (Poland) Łukasz Kubot
3. (Chinese Taipei) Lu Yen-hsun
4. (Russia) Mikhail Youzhny
5. (Australia) Chris Guccione
6. (Italy) Simone Bolelli
7. (Czech Republic) Jan Hernych

=== Lucky loser ===
1. (France) Julien Benneteau

=== Qualifying draw ===
==== First qualifier ====
First round
1	(Croatia) Ivan Ljubičić	6	7^{7}
Alt	(Canada) Jesse Levine	1	6^{4}
(United States) Rajeev Ram	3	6	6
13	(Latvia) Ernests Gulbis	6	3	4

Qualifying competition
1	(Croatia) Ivan Ljubičić	6	4	6
(United States) Rajeev Ram	4	6	3

==== Second qualifier ====
First round
2	(France) Julien Benneteau	7^{7}	7
(United States) Michael Russell	6^{1}	5
Alt	(Poland) Łukasz Kubot	6	6
9	(Russia) Teymuraz Gabashvili	1	2

Qualifying competition
2	(France) Julien Benneteau	2	5
Alt	(Poland) Łukasz Kubot	6	7

==== Third qualifier ====
First round
3	(Chinese Taipei) Lu Yen-hsun	7	3	6
(Ukraine) Sergiy Stakhovsky	5	6	3
(Ecuador) Nicolás Lapentti	3	5
11	(Germany) Rainer Schüttler	6	7

Qualifying competition
3	(Chinese Taipei) Lu Yen-hsun	4	6	6
11	(Germany) Rainer Schüttler	6	4	1

==== Fourth qualifier ====
First round
4	(Russia) Mikhail Youzhny	4	6	7^{7}
(Colombia) Santiago Giraldo	6	4	6^{3}
WC	(United States) Donald Young	4	6^{6}
12	(France) Adrian Mannarino	6	7^{8}

Qualifying competition
4	(Russia) Mikhail Youzhny	6	6
12	(France) Adrian Mannarino	2	1

==== Fifth qualifier ====
First round
5	(Kazakhstan) Andrey Golubev	6^{5}	4
(Australia) Chris Guccione	7^{7}	6
WC	(Cyprus) Marcos Baghdatis	6	3	4
8	(United States) Robert Kendrick	4	6	6

Qualifying competition
(Australia) Chris Guccione	7^{12}	7
8	(United States) Robert Kendrick	6^{10}	5

==== Sixth qualifier ====
First round
6	(Italy) Simone Bolelli	6	6
WC	(United States) Devin Britton	4	3
(United States) Brendan Evans	6^{2}	2
14	(United States) Kevin Kim	7^{7}	6

Qualifying competition
6	(Italy) Simone Bolelli	6	7^{7}
14	(United States) Kevin Kim	3	6^{3}

==== Seventh qualifier ====
First round
7	(Uzbekistan) Denis Istomin	6	7^{7}
(France) Michaël Llodra	3	6^{5}
WC	(United States) Ryan Harrison	3	3
10	(Czech Republic) Jan Hernych	6	6

Qualifying competition
7	(Uzbekistan) Denis Istomin	2	6	2
10	(Czech Republic) Jan Hernych	6	4	6
