= 2012 Sony Ericsson Open – Men's doubles =

Men's doubles
- 2012 Sony Ericsson Open

Final
- Champion: (India) Leander Paes (Czech Republic) Radek Štěpánek
- Runner-up: (Belarus) Max Mirnyi (Canada) Daniel Nestor
- Score: 3–6, 6–1, [10–8]

Events
Singles	men	women
Doubles	men	women
← 2011 ·	Sony Ericsson Open	· 2013 →

Mahesh Bhupathi and Leander Paes were the defending champions, but this year Bhupathi played with Rohan Bopanna and Paes, who also won the tournament in 2010, played with Radek Štěpánek.
Bhupathi and Bopanna were defeated in the semifinals by Max Mirnyi and Daniel Nestor, who were then defeated in the final by Paes and Štěpánek 3–6, 6–1, [10–8].

== Seeds ==
1. (United States) Bob Bryan / (United States) Mike Bryan (semifinals)
2. (Belarus) Max Mirnyi / (Canada) Daniel Nestor (final)
3. (France) Michaël Llodra / (Serbia) Nenad Zimonjić (quarterfinals)
4. (Sweden) Robert Lindstedt / (Romania) Horia Tecău (first round)
5. (Poland) Mariusz Fyrstenberg / (Poland) Marcin Matkowski (first round)
6. (India) Mahesh Bhupathi / (India) Rohan Bopanna (semifinals)
7. (India) Leander Paes / (Czech Republic) Radek Štěpánek (champions)
8. (Czech Republic) František Čermák / (Slovakia) Filip Polášek (first round)

== Draw ==
=== Key ===
- Q = Qualifier
- WC = Wild card
- LL = Lucky loser
- Alt = Alternate
- SE = Special exempt
- PR = Protected ranking
- ITF = ITF entry
- JE = Junior exempt
- w/o = Walkover
- r = Retired
- d = Defaulted
- SR = Special ranking

=== Finals ===
Semifinals
1	(United States) Bob Bryan (United States) Mike Bryan	4	4
7	(India) Leander Paes (Czech Republic) Radek Štěpánek	6	6
6	(India) Mahesh Bhupathi (India) Rohan Bopanna	2	4
2	(Belarus) Max Mirnyi (Canada) Daniel Nestor	6	6

Final
7	(India) Leander Paes (Czech Republic) Radek Štěpánek	3	6	[10]
2	(Belarus) Max Mirnyi (Canada) Daniel Nestor	6	1	[8]

=== Top half ===
First round
1	(United States) B Bryan (United States) M Bryan	6	6
WC	(Australia) P Hanley (Australia) B Tomic	3	2
(Brazil) M Melo (Argentina) J Mónaco	6	3	[14]
WC	(United States) J Blake (United States) R Harrison	3	6	[12]
(Pakistan) A-u-H Qureshi (Netherlands) J-J Rojer	6	6
(Spain) P Andújar (Argentina) C Berlocq	1	4
(Italy) D Bracciali (Colombia) JS Cabal	7^{7}	6
8	(Czech Republic) F Čermák (Slovakia) F Polášek	6^{5}	4
4	(Sweden) R Lindstedt (Romania) H Tecău	6^{5}	2
(Spain) D Marrero (Spain) F Verdasco	7^{7}	6
(Spain) F López (Spain) M López	6	6
(Germany) F Mayer (Serbia) V Troicki	2	2
(United Kingdom) C Fleming (United Kingdom) R Hutchins	6	7^{7}
(United States) M Fish (The Bahamas) M Knowles	1	6^{5}
(Cyprus) M Baghdatis (United States) S Querrey	2	6^{3}
7	(India) L Paes (Czech Republic) R Štěpánek	6	7^{7}

Second round
1	(United States) B Bryan (United States) M Bryan	6	6
(Brazil) M Melo (Argentina) J Mónaco	3	4
(Pakistan) A-u-H Qureshi (Netherlands) J-J Rojer	2	6^{7}
(Italy) D Bracciali (Colombia) JS Cabal	6	7^{9}
(Spain) D Marrero (Spain) F Verdasco	7	6
(Spain) F López (Spain) M López	5	4
(United Kingdom) C Fleming (United Kingdom) R Hutchins	4	3
7	(India) L Paes (Czech Republic) R Štěpánek	6	6

Quarterfinals
1	(United States) B Bryan (United States) M Bryan	6	6
(Italy) D Bracciali (Colombia) JS Cabal	3	1
(Spain) D Marrero (Spain) F Verdasco	6^{6}	4
7	(India) L Paes (Czech Republic) R Štěpánek	7^{8}	6

Semifinals
1	(United States) B Bryan (United States) M Bryan	4	4
7	(India) L Paes (Czech Republic) R Štěpánek	6	6

=== Bottom half ===
First round
6	(India) M Bhupathi (India) R Bopanna	7	6
(Austria) J Melzer (United Kingdom) J Murray	5	3
(Croatia) M Čilić (Croatia) I Karlović	1	3
(Spain) M Granollers (Spain) R Nadal	6	6
(France) N Mahut (France) G Simon	6	2	[7]
(South Africa) K Anderson (Canada) M Raonic	4	6	[10]
(Ukraine) A Dolgopolov (Belgium) X Malisse	3	6^{4}
3	(France) M Llodra (Serbia) N Zimonjić	6	7^{7}
5	(Poland) M Fyrstenberg (Poland) M Matkowski	3	2
(Poland) Ł Kubot (Serbia) J Tipsarević	6	6
(Czech Republic) T Berdych (Czech Republic) L Dlouhý	5	1
(Mexico) S González (United States) S Lipsky	7	6
(Austria) O Marach (Austria) A Peya	7^{7}	7^{7}
(Spain) N Almagro (Brazil) T Bellucci	6^{5}	6^{5}
(United States) E Butorac (Brazil) B Soares	3	6^{4}
2	(Belarus) M Mirnyi (Canada) D Nestor	6	7^{7}

Second round
6	(India) M Bhupathi (India) R Bopanna	6	6
(Spain) M Granollers (Spain) R Nadal	4	3
(South Africa) K Anderson (Canada) M Raonic	1^{r}
3	(France) M Llodra (Serbia) N Zimonjić	2
(Poland) Ł Kubot (Serbia) J Tipsarević	6	6
(Mexico) S González (United States) S Lipsky	0	3
(Austria) O Marach (Austria) A Peya	5	1
2	(Belarus) M Mirnyi (Canada) D Nestor	7	6

Quarterfinals
6	(India) M Bhupathi (India) R Bopanna	2	6	[10]
3	(France) M Llodra (Serbia) N Zimonjić	6	3	[8]
(Poland) Ł Kubot (Serbia) J Tipsarević	1	4
2	(Belarus) M Mirnyi (Canada) D Nestor	6	6

Semifinals
6	(India) M Bhupathi (India) R Bopanna	2	4
2	(Belarus) M Mirnyi (Canada) D Nestor	6	6
