= 2009 Rogers Masters – Men's doubles =

Men's doubles
- 2009 Rogers Masters

Final
- Champions: (India) Mahesh Bhupathi (The Bahamas) Mark Knowles
- Runners-up: (Belarus) Max Mirnyi (Israel) Andy Ram
- Score: 6–4, 6–3

Details
- Draw: 28
- Seeds: 8

Events
Singles	Doubles
- Rogers Masters

Daniel Nestor and Nenad Zimonjić were the defending champions, but lost in the semifinals to Mahesh Bhupathi and Mark Knowles.

Mahesh Bhupathi and Mark Knowles won in the final 6–4, 6–3 against Max Mirnyi and Andy Ram.

== Seeds ==
All seeds receive a bye into the second round.

1. (United States) Bob Bryan / (United States) Mike Bryan (semifinals)
2. (Canada) Daniel Nestor / (Serbia) Nenad Zimonjić (semifinals)
3. (India) Mahesh Bhupathi / (The Bahamas) Mark Knowles (champions)
4. (Brazil) Bruno Soares / (Zimbabwe) Kevin Ullyett (second round)
5. (South Africa) Wesley Moodie / (Belgium) Dick Norman (quarterfinals)
6. (Poland) Mariusz Fyrstenberg / (Poland) Marcin Matkowski (quarterfinals)
7. (Belarus) Max Mirnyi / (Israel) Andy Ram (final)
8. (Poland) Łukasz Kubot / (Austria) Oliver Marach (quarterfinals)

== Draw ==
Key

- Q = Qualifier
- WC = Wild card
- LL = Lucky loser
- Alt = Alternate
- ITF = ITF entry
- PR = Protected ranking
- SR = Special ranking
- SE = Special exempt
- JE = Junior exempt
- JR = Junior Accelerator Programme entrant
- CO = College Accelerator Programme entrant
- NG = Next Gen Accelerator Program entrant
- w/o = Walkover
- r = Retired
- d = Defaulted

=== Finals ===
Semifinals
1	(United States) Bob Bryan (United States) Mike Bryan	6^{5}	2
7	(Belarus) Max Mirnyi (Israel) Andy Ram	7^{7}	6
3	(India) Mahesh Bhupathi (The Bahamas) Mark Knowles	5	6	[10]
2	(Canada) Daniel Nestor (Serbia) Nenad Zimonjić	7	2	[4]

Final
7	(Belarus) Max Mirnyi (Israel) Andy Ram	4	3
3	(India) Mahesh Bhupathi (The Bahamas) Mark Knowles	6	6

=== Top half ===
First round
(United States) T Parrott (Slovakia) F Polášek	3	6^{4}
(Sweden) R Lindstedt (Brazil) M Melo	6	7^{7}
WC	(Canada) F Dancevic (Canada) P-L Duclos	7	5	[14]
(Russia) N Davydenko (Russia) I Kunitsyn	5	7	[12]
(Czech Republic) L Dlouhý (Germany) P Petzschner	6	6
(Germany) P Kohlschreiber (Switzerland) S Wawrinka	2	2
WC	(Spain) R Nadal (Spain) F Roig	7	6
(Serbia) N Djokovic (Serbia) D Vemić	5	4

Second round
1	(United States) B Bryan (United States) M Bryan	6	7
(Sweden) R Lindstedt (Brazil) M Melo	4	5
WC	(Canada) F Dancevic (Canada) P-L Duclos	2	3
8	(Poland) Ł Kubot (Austria) O Marach	6	6
4	(Brazil) B Soares (Zimbabwe) K Ullyett	4	3
(Czech Republic) L Dlouhý (Germany) P Petzschner	6	6
WC	(Spain) R Nadal (Spain) F Roig	6	3	[8]
7	(Belarus) M Mirnyi (Israel) A Ram	4	6	[10]

Quarterfinals
1	(United States) B Bryan (United States) M Bryan	6	6
8	(Poland) Ł Kubot (Austria) O Marach	0	3
(Czech Republic) L Dlouhý (Germany) P Petzschner	2	3
7	(Belarus) M Mirnyi (Israel) A Ram	6	6

Semifinals
1	(United States) B Bryan (United States) M Bryan	6^{5}	2
7	(Belarus) M Mirnyi (Israel) A Ram	7^{7}	6

=== Bottom half ===
First round
(France) J Chardy (France) G Simon	4	0
(Germany) T Haas (Czech Republic) R Štěpánek	6	6
ALT	(South Africa) J Coetzee (Austria) J Melzer	3	6	[10]
(United Kingdom) R Hutchins (United Kingdom) A Murray	6	3	[7]
(Sweden) S Aspelin (Australia) P Hanley	3	7^{7}	[6]
(Spain) F López (Spain) F Verdasco	6	6^{1}	[10]
(Spain) D Ferrer (Spain) T Robredo	7^{8}	1	[10]
(France) M Llodra (France) J-W Tsonga	6^{6}	6	[8]

Second round
6	(Poland) M Fyrstenberg (Poland) M Matkowski	w/o
(Germany) T Haas (Czech Republic) R Štěpánek
ALT	(South Africa) J Coetzee (Austria) J Melzer	6^{2}	4
3	(India) M Bhupathi (The Bahamas) M Knowles	7^{7}	6
5	(South Africa) W Moodie (Belgium) D Norman	7^{9}	7^{7}
(Spain) F López (Spain) F Verdasco	6^{7}	6^{5}
(Spain) D Ferrer (Spain) T Robredo
2	(Canada) D Nestor (Serbia) N Zimonjić	w/o

Quarterfinals
6	(Poland) M Fyrstenberg (Poland) M Matkowski	3	4
3	(India) M Bhupathi (The Bahamas) M Knowles	6	6
5	(South Africa) W Moodie (Belgium) D Norman	2	4
2	(Canada) D Nestor (Serbia) N Zimonjić	6	6

Semifinals
3	(India) M Bhupathi (The Bahamas) M Knowles	5	6	[10]
2	(Canada) D Nestor (Serbia) N Zimonjić	7	2	[4]
