= 2009 Western & Southern Financial Group Masters – Doubles =

Doubles
- 2009 Western & Southern Financial Group Masters

Final
- Champions: (Canada) Daniel Nestor (Serbia) Nenad Zimonjić
- Runners-up: (United States) Bob Bryan (United States) Mike Bryan
- Score: 3–6, 7–6^{(7–2)}, [15–13]

Events
Singles	Doubles
← 2008 ·	Western & Southern Financial Group Masters	· 2010 →

Bob Bryan and Mike Bryan were the defending champions, but lost in the final to Daniel Nestor and Nenad Zimonjić, 3–6, 7–6^{(7–2)}, [15–13].

== Seeds ==
The top four seeds receive a bye into the second round.

1. (United States) Bob Bryan / (United States) Mike Bryan (final)
2. (Canada) Daniel Nestor / (Serbia) Nenad Zimonjić (champions)
3. (Czech Republic) Lukáš Dlouhý / (India) Leander Paes (second round)
4. (India) Mahesh Bhupathi / (The Bahamas) Mark Knowles (semifinals)
5. (Brazil) Bruno Soares / (Zimbabwe) Kevin Ullyett (second round)
6. (Poland) Mariusz Fyrstenberg / (Poland) Marcin Matkowski (quarterfinals)
7. (South Africa) Wesley Moodie / (Belgium) Dick Norman (quarterfinals)
8. (Poland) Łukasz Kubot / (Austria) Oliver Marach (semifinals)

== Draw ==
=== Key ===
- Q = Qualifier
- WC = Wild card
- LL = Lucky loser
- Alt = Alternate
- ITF = ITF entry
- PR = Protected ranking
- SR = Special ranking
- SE = Special exempt
- JE = Junior exempt
- JR = Junior Accelerator Programme entrant
- CO = College Accelerator Programme entrant
- NG = Next Gen Accelerator Program entrant
- w/o = Walkover
- r = Retired
- d = Defaulted

=== Finals ===
Semifinals
1	(United States) Bob Bryan (United States) Mike Bryan	0	6	[10]
8	(Poland) Łukasz Kubot (Austria) Oliver Marach	6	4	[4]
4	(India) Mahesh Bhupathi (The Bahamas) Mark Knowles	4	3
2	(Canada) Daniel Nestor (Serbia) Nenad Zimonjić	6	6

Final
1	(United States) Bob Bryan (United States) Mike Bryan	6	6^{2}	[13]
2	(Canada) Daniel Nestor (Serbia) Nenad Zimonjić	3	7^{7}	[15]

=== Top half ===
First round
WC	(United States) J Levine (United States) R Ram	2	2
(Belarus) M Mirnyi (Israel) A Ram	6	6
(Czech Republic) T Berdych (Germany) P Kohlschreiber	5	7^{7}	[10]
(Russia) N Davydenko (Russia) I Kunitsyn	7	6^{4}	[7]
(Czech Republic) F Čermák (Slovakia) M Mertiňák	4	7^{7}	[7]
(Spain) D Ferrer (Spain) T Robredo	6	6^{2}	[10]
(Australia) J Kerr (Brazil) A Sá	6	4	[9]
WC	(United States) J Isner (United States) S Querrey	1	6	[11]

Second round
1	(United States) B Bryan (United States) M Bryan	6	6
(Belarus) M Mirnyi (Israel) A Ram	4	2
(Czech Republic) T Berdych (Germany) P Kohlschreiber
7	(South Africa) W Moodie (Belgium) D Norman	w/o
3	(Czech Republic) L Dlouhý (India) L Paes	2	4
(Spain) D Ferrer (Spain) T Robredo	6	6
WC	(United States) J Isner (United States) S Querrey	6	2	[8]
8	(Poland) Ł Kubot (Austria) O Marach	4	6	[10]

Quarterfinals
1	(United States) B Bryan (United States) M Bryan	6	7^{13}
7	(South Africa) W Moodie (Belgium) D Norman	4	6^{11}
(Spain) D Ferrer (Spain) T Robredo	6^{2}	1
8	(Poland) Ł Kubot (Austria) O Marach	7^{7}	6

Semifinals
1	(United States) B Bryan (United States) M Bryan	0	6	[10]
8	(Poland) Ł Kubot (Austria) O Marach	6	4	[4]

=== Bottom half ===
First round
(Austria) J Melzer (Czech Republic) R Štěpánek	6^{2}	4
(France) M Llodra (France) J-W Tsonga	7^{7}	6
(Australia) S Huss (United Kingdom) R Hutchins	6	6^{2}	[3]
(Spain) F López (Spain) F Verdasco	4	7^{7}	[10]
(United States) T Parrott (Slovakia) F Polášek	6	6^{3}	[10]
(France) J Chardy (France) G Simon	4	7^{7}	[12]
(Sweden) R Lindstedt (Brazil) M Melo	7^{7}	3	[14]
(South Africa) J Coetzee (Israel) J Erlich	6^{3}	6	[12]

Second round
5	(Brazil) B Soares (Zimbabwe) K Ullyett	0	3
(France) M Llodra (France) J-W Tsonga	6	6
(Spain) F López (Spain) F Verdasco	7	4	[10]
4	(India) M Bhupathi (The Bahamas) M Knowles	5	6	[12]
6	(Poland) M Fyrstenberg (Poland) M Matkowski	6	6
(France) J Chardy (France) G Simon	2	4
(Sweden) R Lindstedt (Brazil) M Melo	4	4
2	(Canada) D Nestor (Serbia) N Zimonjić	6	6

Quarterfinals
(France) M Llodra (France) J-W Tsonga	6^{6}	3
4	(India) M Bhupathi (The Bahamas) M Knowles	7^{8}	6
6	(Poland) M Fyrstenberg (Poland) M Matkowski	6^{6}	7^{8}	[4]
2	(Canada) D Nestor (Serbia) N Zimonjić	7^{8}	6^{6}	[10]

Semifinals
4	(India) M Bhupathi (The Bahamas) M Knowles	4	3
2	(Canada) D Nestor (Serbia) N Zimonjić	6	6
