= Max Mirnyi =

Belarusian tennis player

Maksim Mirnyi
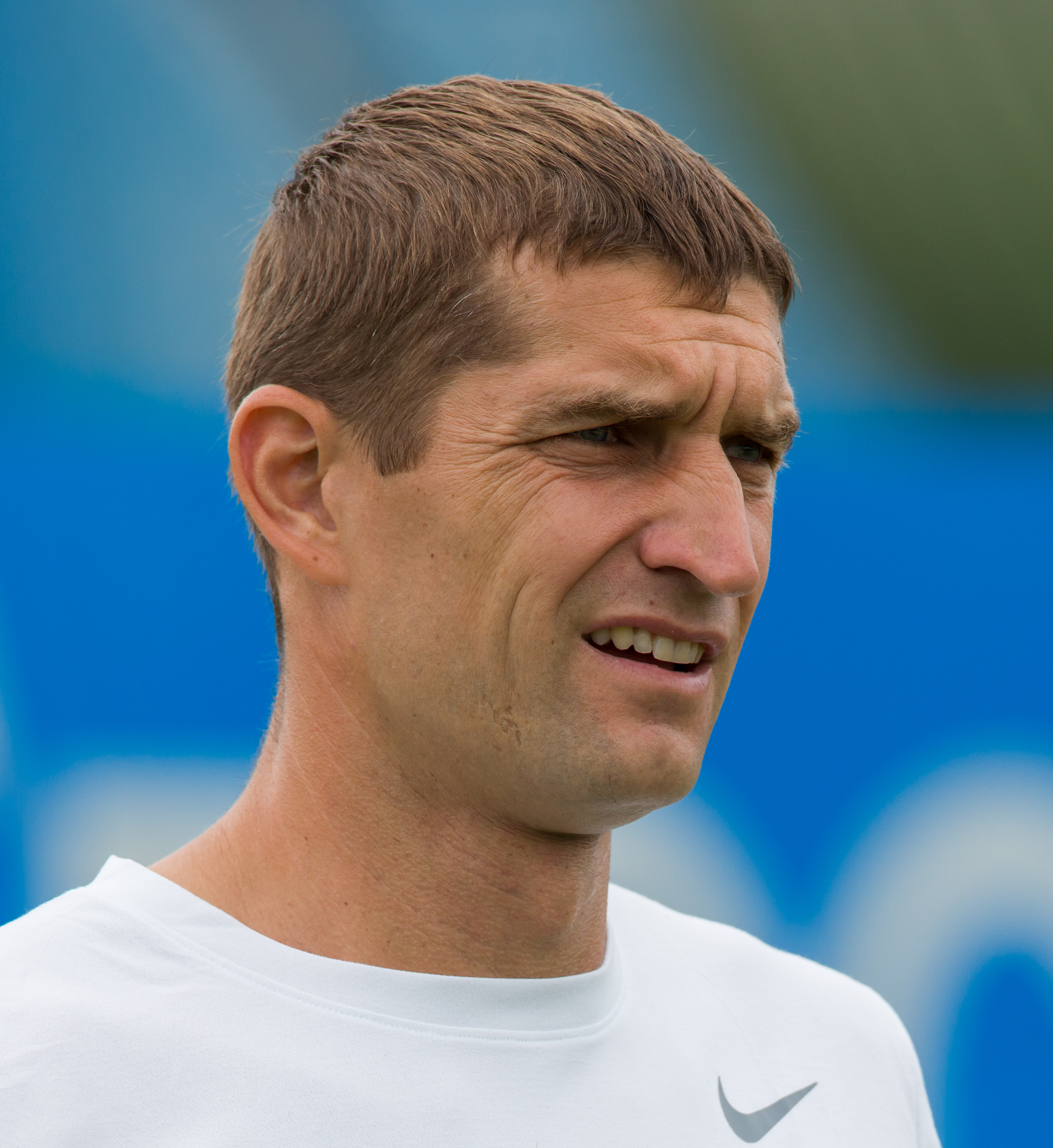
- Mirnyi in 2015
- Native name: Максім Мірны
- Country (sports): Belarus
- Residence: Sarasota, Florida, US
- Born: 6 July 1977 (age 49) Minsk, Belarusian SSR, Soviet Union
- Height: 1.96 m (6 ft 5 in)
- Turned pro: 1996
- Retired: 29 November 2018
- Plays: Right-handed (one-handed backhand)
- Coach: Nikolai Mirnyi
- Prize money: US$11,763,620
- Official website: maxmirnyi.com

Singles
- Career record: 244–242
- Career titles: 1
- Highest ranking: No. 18 (18 August 2003)

Grand Slam singles results
- Australian Open: 3R (2000, 2006)
- French Open: 2R (1999, 2006)
- Wimbledon: 4R (2003, 2005, 2006)
- US Open: QF (2002)

Other tournaments
- Olympic Games: QF (2000)

Doubles
- Career record: 780–445
- Career titles: 52
- Highest ranking: No. 1 (9 June 2003)

Grand Slam doubles results
- Australian Open: F (2007)
- French Open: W (2005, 2006, 2011, 2012)
- Wimbledon: F (2003)
- US Open: W (2000, 2002)

Other doubles tournaments
- Tour Finals: W (2006, 2011)
- Olympic Games: QF (2000)

Mixed doubles
- Career titles: 5

Grand Slam mixed doubles results
- Australian Open: F (1999, 2007)
- French Open: QF (2010, 2012, 2016)
- Wimbledon: W (1998)
- US Open: W (1998, 2007, 2013)

Other mixed doubles tournaments
- Olympic Games: W (2012)
Medal record
Tennis
Representing Belarus
Olympic Games
Gold medal – first place	2012 London	Mixed doubles

Maksim Mikalaevich "Max" Mirnyi (Note: Belarusian: Максім Мікалаевіч Мірны, pronounced [makˈsʲim ˈmʲirnɨ]; Russian: Максим Николаевич Мирный, romanized: Maksim Nikolayevich Mirny, pronounced [mɐkˈsʲim ˈmʲirnɨj]) (born 6 July 1977) is a Belarusian former professional tennis player.

Mirnyi became a doubles specialist following his singles career, in which he reached a career-high of World No. 18 (August 2003) and finished in the top 50 in the world for seven straight years despite only winning one ATP singles title (2003 Rotterdam Open). He represented Belarus in Davis Cup competition from April 1994, where he holds a record of 47 wins and 27 losses in 35 ties played. He reached the World No. 1 doubles ranking in June 2003 and won ten Grand Slam titles: Men's doubles in the 2000 and 2002 US Open and the 2005, 2006, 2011 and 2012 French Open; and mixed doubles in the 1998, 2007, and 2013 U.S. Opens and 1998 Wimbledon.

At the 2012 Summer Olympics in London, Mirnyi carried the flag of Belarus at the Opening Ceremony on 27 July 2012, and won the gold medal in the mixed doubles with Victoria Azarenka on 5 August 2012.

His nickname is "The Beast of Belarus".

== Career ==
Mirnyi won the 1998 US Open and 1998 Wimbledon mixed doubles titles while partnering with Serena Williams, and lost the final of the 1999 Australian Open while partnering with her. His best performance at a Grand Slam in singles came when he got to the quarterfinals of the 2002 US Open, defeating Attila Sávolt, Antony Dupuis, Dominik Hrbatý and Roger Federer before losing to Andre Agassi. In the 2004 Davis Cup, he and Vladimir Voltchkov defeated Russia 3–2 and Argentina 5–0, reaching the semifinals, where they lost to the United States. In 2006, he scored an upset against James Blake at Wimbledon. That same year, he and Jonas Björkman defeated the Bryan brothers in men's doubles at the 2006 French Open. In 2011, he and Daniel Nestor defeated Juan Sebastián Cabal and Eduardo Schwank at the 2011 French Open. In 2012, he and Daniel Nestor defeated the Bryan brothers, both at the Queen's Club, UK, and again at the 2012 French Open.

== Significant finals ==
=== Grand Slam finals ===
==== Doubles: 10 (6 titles, 4 runner-ups) ====
Result	Year	Championship	Surface	Partner	Opponents	Score
Win	2000	US Open	Hard	(Australia) Lleyton Hewitt	(South Africa) Ellis Ferreira (United States) Rick Leach	6–4, 5–7, 7–6^{(7–5)}
Win	2002	US Open (2)	Hard	(India) Mahesh Bhupathi	(Czech Republic) Jiří Novák (Czech Republic) Radek Štěpánek	6–3, 3–6, 6–4
Loss	2003	Wimbledon	Grass	(India) Mahesh Bhupathi	(Sweden) Jonas Björkman (Australia) Todd Woodbridge	6–3, 3–6, 6–7^{(4–7)}, 3–6
Win	2005	French Open	Clay	(Sweden) Jonas Björkman	(United States) Bob Bryan (United States) Mike Bryan	2–6, 6–1, 6–4
Loss	2005	US Open	Hard	(Sweden) Jonas Björkman	(United States) Bob Bryan (United States) Mike Bryan	1–6, 4–6
Win	2006	French Open (2)	Clay	(Sweden) Jonas Björkman	(United States) Bob Bryan (United States) Mike Bryan	6–7^{(7–5)}, 6–4, 7–5
Loss	2006	US Open	Hard	(Sweden) Jonas Björkman	(Czech Republic) Martin Damm (India) Leander Paes	7–6^{(7–5)}, 4–6, 3–6
Loss	2007	Australian Open	Hard	(Sweden) Jonas Björkman	(United States) Bob Bryan (United States) Mike Bryan	5–7, 5–7
Win	2011	French Open (3)	Clay	(Canada) Daniel Nestor	(Colombia) Juan Sebastián Cabal (Argentina) Eduardo Schwank	7–6^{(7–3)}, 3–6, 6–4
Win	2012	French Open (4)	Clay	(Canada) Daniel Nestor	(United States) Bob Bryan (United States) Mike Bryan	6–4, 6–4

==== Mixed doubles: 8 (4 titles, 4 runner-ups) ====
Result	Year	Championship	Surface	Partner	Opponents	Score
Win	1998	Wimbledon	Grass	(United States) Serena Williams	(Croatia) Mirjana Lučić (India) Mahesh Bhupathi	6–4, 6–4
Win	1998	US Open	Hard	(United States) Serena Williams	(United States) Lisa Raymond (United States) Patrick Galbraith	6–2, 6–2
Loss	1999	Australian Open	Hard	(United States) Serena Williams	(South Africa) Mariaan de Swardt (South Africa) David Adams	4–6, 6–4, 6–7^{(5–7)}
Loss	2000	US Open	Hard	(Russia) Anna Kournikova	(Spain) Arantxa Sánchez Vicario (United States) Jared Palmer	4–6, 3–6
Loss	2007	Australian Open	Hard	(Belarus) Victoria Azarenka	(Russia) Elena Likhovtseva (Canada) Daniel Nestor	4–6, 4–6
Win	2007	US Open (2)	Hard	(Belarus) Victoria Azarenka	(United States) Meghann Shaughnessy (India) Leander Paes	6–4, 7–6^{(8–6)}
Win	2013	US Open (3)	Hard	(Czech Republic) Andrea Hlaváčková	(United States) Abigail Spears (Mexico) Santiago González	7–6^{(7–5)}, 6–3
Loss	2014	Wimbledon	Grass	(Chinese Taipei) Chan Hao-ching	(Australia) Samantha Stosur (Serbia) Nenad Zimonjić	4–6, 2–6

=== Year-end championships ===
==== Doubles: 4 (2 titles, 2 runner-ups) ====
Result	Year	Championship	Surface	Partner	Opponents	Score
Win	2006	Tennis Masters Cup, Shanghai	Hard (i)	(Sweden) Jonas Björkman	(The Bahamas) Mark Knowles (Canada) Daniel Nestor	6–2, 6–4
Loss	2009	ATP World Tour Finals, London	Hard (i)	(Israel) Andy Ram	(United States) Bob Bryan (United States) Mike Bryan	6–7^{(5–7)}, 3–6
Loss	2010	ATP World Tour Finals, London	Hard (i)	(India) Mahesh Bhupathi	(Canada) Daniel Nestor (Serbia) Nenad Zimonjić	6–7^{(6–8)}, 4–6
Win	2011	ATP World Tour Finals, London (2)	Hard (i)	(Canada) Daniel Nestor	(Poland) Mariusz Fyrstenberg (Poland) Marcin Matkowski	7–5, 6–3

=== Olympic medal matches ===
==== Mixed doubles: 1 (1 gold medal) ====
Result	Year	Championship	Surface	Partner	Opponents	Score
Gold	2012	Summer Olympics, London	Grass	(Belarus) Victoria Azarenka	(United Kingdom) Laura Robson (United Kingdom) Andy Murray	2–6, 6–3, [10–8]

=== Masters 1000 finals ===
==== Singles: 1 (1 runner-up) ====
Result	Year	Tournament	Surface	Opponent	Score
Loss	2001	Stuttgart Masters	Hard (i)	(Germany) Tommy Haas	2–6, 2–6, 2–6

==== Doubles: 29 (16 titles, 13 runner-ups) ====
Result	Year	Tournament	Surface	Partner	Opponents	Score
Win	2000	Paris Masters	Carpet (i)	(Sweden) Nicklas Kulti	(Netherlands) Paul Haarhuis (Canada) Daniel Nestor	6–4, 7–5
Win	2001	Stuttgart Masters	Hard (i)	(Australia) Sandon Stolle	(South Africa) Ellis Ferreira (United States) Jeff Tarango	7–6^{(7–0)}, 7–6^{(7–4)}
Loss	2002	Indian Wells Masters	Hard	(Switzerland) Roger Federer	(The Bahamas) Mark Knowles (Canada) Daniel Nestor	4–6, 4–6
Loss	2002	Cincinnati Masters	Hard	(India) Mahesh Bhupathi	(United States) James Blake (United States) Todd Martin	5–7, 3–6
Loss	2002	Madrid Open	Hard (i)	(India) Mahesh Bhupathi	(The Bahamas) Mark Knowles (Canada) Daniel Nestor	3–6, 5–7, 0–6
Win	2003	Miami Open	Hard	(Switzerland) Roger Federer	(India) Leander Paes (Czech Republic) David Rikl	7–5, 6–3
Win	2003	Monte-Carlo Masters	Clay	(India) Mahesh Bhupathi	(France) Michaël Llodra (France) Fabrice Santoro	6–4, 3–6, 7–6^{(8–6)}
Loss	2003	Hamburg Masters	Clay	(India) Mahesh Bhupathi	(The Bahamas) Mark Knowles (Canada) Daniel Nestor	4–6, 6–7^{(10–12)}
Win	2003	Canadian Open	Hard	(India) Mahesh Bhupathi	(Sweden) Jonas Björkman (Australia) Todd Woodbridge	6–3, 7–6^{(7–4)}
Win	2003	Madrid Open	Hard (i)	(India) Mahesh Bhupathi	(Zimbabwe) Wayne Black (Zimbabwe) Kevin Ullyett	6–2, 2–6, 6–3
Win	2004	Italian Open	Clay	(India) Mahesh Bhupathi	(Australia) Wayne Arthurs (Australia) Paul Hanley	2–6, 6–3, 6–4
Loss	2004	Canadian Open	Hard	(Sweden) Jonas Björkman	(India) Mahesh Bhupathi (India) Leander Paes	4–6, 2–6
Win	2005	Miami Open (2)	Hard	(Sweden) Jonas Björkman	(Zimbabwe) Wayne Black (Zimbabwe) Kevin Ullyett	6–1, 6–2
Win	2005	Hamburg Masters	Clay	(Sweden) Jonas Björkman	(France) Michaël Llodra (France) Fabrice Santoro	4–6, 7–6^{(7–2)}, 7–6^{(7–3)}
Win	2005	Cincinnati Masters	Hard	(Sweden) Jonas Björkman	(Zimbabwe) Wayne Black (Zimbabwe) Kevin Ullyett	7–6^{(7–3)}, 6–2
Win	2006	Miami Open (3)	Hard	(Sweden) Jonas Björkman	(United States) Bob Bryan (United States) Mike Bryan	6–4, 6–4
Win	2006	Monte-Carlo Masters (2)	Clay	(Sweden) Jonas Björkman	(France) Fabrice Santoro (Serbia and Montenegro) Nenad Zimonjić	6–2, 7–6^{(7–2)}
Win	2006	Cincinnati Masters (2)	Hard	(Sweden) Jonas Björkman	(United States) Bob Bryan (United States) Mike Bryan	3–6, 6–3, [10–7]
Loss	2009	Indian Wells Masters	Hard	(Israel) Andy Ram	(United States) Mardy Fish (United States) Andy Roddick	6–3, 1–6, [12–14]
Win	2009	Miami Open (4)	Hard	(Israel) Andy Ram	(Australia) Ashley Fisher (Australia) Stephen Huss	6–7^{(4–7)}, 6–2, [10–7]
Loss	2009	Canadian Open	Hard	(Israel) Andy Ram	(India) Mahesh Bhupathi (The Bahamas) Mark Knowles	4–6, 3–6
Loss	2010	Miami Open	Hard	(India) Mahesh Bhupathi	(Czech Republic) Lukáš Dlouhý (India) Leander Paes	2–6, 5–7
Loss	2010	Monte-Carlo Masters	Clay	(India) Mahesh Bhupathi	(Canada) Daniel Nestor (Serbia) Nenad Zimonjić	3–6, 0–2 ret.
Loss	2010	Cincinnati Masters	Hard	(India) Mahesh Bhupathi	(United States) Bob Bryan (United States) Mike Bryan	3–6, 4–6
Win	2010	Paris Masters (2)	Hard (i)	(India) Mahesh Bhupathi	(The Bahamas) Mark Knowles (Israel) Andy Ram	7–5, 7–5
Loss	2011	Miami Open	Hard	(Canada) Daniel Nestor	(India) Mahesh Bhupathi (India) Leander Paes	7–6^{(7–5)}, 2–6, [5–10]
Win	2011	Shanghai Masters	Hard	(Canada) Daniel Nestor	(France) Michaël Llodra (Serbia) Nenad Zimonjić	3–6, 6–1, [12–10]
Loss	2012	Miami Open	Hard	(Canada) Daniel Nestor	(India) Leander Paes (Czech Republic) Radek Štěpánek	6–3, 1–6, [8–10]
Loss	2012	Monte-Carlo Masters	Clay	(Canada) Daniel Nestor	(United States) Bob Bryan (United States) Mike Bryan	2–6, 3–6

== ATP career finals ==
=== Singles: 4 (1 title, 3 runner-ups) ===
Legend Grand Slam tournaments (0–0) Tennis Masters Cup / ATP World Tour Finals (0–0) ATP Masters Series / ATP World Tour Masters 1000 (0–1) ATP International Series Gold / ATP World Tour 500 Series (1–1) ATP International Series / ATP World Tour 250 Series (0–1)	Finals by surface Hard (1–2) Clay (0–0) Grass (0–1) Carpet (0–0)	Finals by setting Outdoor (0–1) Indoor (1–2)

Result	W–L	Date	Tournament	Tier	Surface	Opponent	Score
Loss	0–1	Oct 2001	Stuttgart Masters, Germany	Masters	Hard (i)	(Germany) Tommy Haas	2–6, 2–6, 2–6
Win	1–1	Feb 2003	Rotterdam Open, Netherlands	Intl. Gold	Hard (i)	(Netherlands) Raemon Sluiter	7–6^{(7–3)}, 6–4
Loss	1–2	Feb 2005	U.S. National Indoor Tennis Championships, US	Intl. Gold	Hard (i)	(Denmark) Kenneth Carlsen	5–7, 5–7
Loss	1–3	Jun 2005	Nottingham Open, UK	International	Grass	(France) Richard Gasquet	2–6, 3–6

=== Doubles: 98 (52 titles, 46 runner-ups) ===
Legend Grand Slam tournaments (6–4) Tennis Masters Cup / ATP World Tour Finals (2–2) ATP Masters Series / ATP World Tour Masters 1000 (16–13) ATP International Series Gold / ATP World Tour 500 Series (7–7) ATP International Series / ATP World Tour 250 Series (21–20)	Finals by surface Hard (30–35) Clay (13–4) Grass (2–5) Carpet (7–2)	Finals by setting Outdoor (31–35) Indoor (21–11)

Result	W–L	Date	Tournament	Tier	Surface	Partner	Opponents	Score
Win	1–0	Feb 1997	Shanghai Open, China	World Series	Carpet (i)	(Zimbabwe) Kevin Ullyett	(Sweden) Tomas Nydahl (Italy) Stefano Pescosolido	7–6, 6–7, 7–5
Loss	1–1	Oct 1997	Grand Prix de Tennis de Toulouse, France	World Series	Hard (i)	(France) Jean-Philippe Fleurian	(Netherlands) Jacco Eltingh (Netherlands) Paul Haarhuis	3–6, 6–7
Loss	1–2	Apr 1998	Chennai Open, India	World Series	Hard	(France) Olivier Delaître	(India) Mahesh Bhupathi (India) Leander Paes	7–6, 3–6, 2–6
Win	2–2	Feb 1999	Open 13, France	World Series	Hard (i)	(Russia) Andrei Olhovskiy	(South Africa) David Adams (Czech Republic) Pavel Vízner	7–5, 7–6
Win	3–2	Mar 1999	Copenhagen Open, Denmark	World Series	Carpet (i)	(Russia) Andrei Olhovskiy	(Germany) Marc-Kevin Goellner (Germany) David Prinosil	6–7^{(5–7)}, 7–6^{(7–4)}, 6–1
Win	4–2	May 1999	Delray Beach Open, US	World Series	Clay	(Serbia and Montenegro) Nenad Zimonjić	(United States) Doug Flach (United States) Brian MacPhie	7–6^{(7–3)}, 3–6, 6–3
Win	5–2	Oct 1999	Singapore Open, Singapore	Champ. Series	Hard (i)	(Philippines) Eric Taino	(Australia) Todd Woodbridge (Australia) Mark Woodforde	6–3, 6–4
Win	6–2	Jan 2000	Qatar Open, Qatar	International	Hard	(The Bahamas) Mark Knowles	(United States) Alex O'Brien (United States) Jared Palmer	6–3, 6–4
Loss	6–3	May 2000	Bavarian Championships, Germany	International	Clay	(Serbia and Montenegro) Nenad Zimonjić	(South Africa) David Adams (South Africa) John-Laffnie de Jager	4–6, 4–6
Loss	6–4	May 2000	Indianapolis Championships, US	Intl. Gold	Hard	(Sweden) Jonas Björkman	(Australia) Lleyton Hewitt (Australia) Sandon Stolle	2–6, 6–3, 3–6
Win	7–4	Sep 2000	US Open, US	Grand Slam	Hard	(Australia) Lleyton Hewitt	(South Africa) Ellis Ferreira (United States) Rick Leach	6–4, 5–7, 7–6^{(7–5)}
Win	8–4	Nov 2000	Paris Masters, France	Masters	Carpet (i)	(Sweden) Nicklas Kulti	(Netherlands) Paul Haarhuis (Canada) Daniel Nestor	6–4, 7–5
Loss	8–5	Jun 2001	Halle Open, Germany	International	Grass	(Australia) Pat Rafter	(Canada) Daniel Nestor (Australia) Sandon Stolle	4–6, 7–6^{(7–5)}, 1–6
Win	9–5	Oct 2001	Kremlin Cup, Russia	International	Carpet (i)	(Australia) Sandon Stolle	(India) Mahesh Bhupathi (United States) Jeff Tarango	6–3, 6–0
Win	10–5	Oct 2001	Stuttgart Masters, Germany	Masters	Hard (i)	(Australia) Sandon Stolle	(South Africa) Ellis Ferreira (United States) Jeff Tarango	7–6^{(7–0)}, 7–6^{(7–4)}
Loss	10–6	Feb 2002	Milan Indoor, Italy	International	Carpet (i)	(France) Julien Boutter	(Germany) Karsten Braasch (Russia) Andrei Olhovskiy	6–3, 6–7^{(5–7)}, [10–12]
Loss	10–7	Feb 2002	Open 13, France	International	Hard (i)	(France) Julien Boutter	(France) Arnaud Clément (France) Nicolas Escudé	4–6, 3–6
Win	11–7	Feb 2002	Rotterdam Open, Netherlands	Intl. Gold	Hard (i)	(Switzerland) Roger Federer	(The Bahamas) Mark Knowles (Canada) Daniel Nestor	4–6, 6–3, [10–4]
Loss	11–8	Mar 2002	Indian Wells Masters, US	Masters	Hard	(Switzerland) Roger Federer	(The Bahamas) Mark Knowles (Canada) Daniel Nestor	4–6, 4–6
Loss	11–9	Jun 2002	Queen's Club Championships, UK	International	Grass	(India) Mahesh Bhupathi	(Zimbabwe) Wayne Black (Zimbabwe) Kevin Ullyett	5–7, 3–6
Loss	11–10	Aug 2002	Cincinnati Masters, US	Masters	Hard	(India) Mahesh Bhupathi	(United States) James Blake (United States) Todd Martin	5–7, 3–6
Loss	11–11	Aug 2002	Indianapolis Championships, US	Intl. Gold	Hard	(India) Mahesh Bhupathi	(The Bahamas) Mark Knowles (Canada) Daniel Nestor	6–4, 6–7^{(3–7)}, 4–6
Win	12–11	Sep 2002	US Open, US (2)	Grand Slam	Hard	(India) Mahesh Bhupathi	(Czech Republic) Jiří Novák (Czech Republic) Radek Štěpánek	6–3, 3–6, 6–4
Win	13–11	Oct 2002	Kremlin Cup, Russia (2)	International	Carpet (i)	(Switzerland) Roger Federer	(Australia) Joshua Eagle (Australia) Sandon Stolle	6–4, 7–6^{(7–0)}
Loss	13–12	Oct 2002	Madrid Open, Spain	Masters	Hard (i)	(India) Mahesh Bhupathi	(The Bahamas) Mark Knowles (Canada) Daniel Nestor	3–6, 5–7, 0–6
Loss	13–13	Jan 2003	Adelaide International, Australia	International	Hard	(United States) Jeff Morrison	(South Africa) Jeff Coetzee (South Africa) Chris Haggard	6–2, 4–6, 6–7^{(7–9)}
Loss	13–14	Feb 2003	Rotterdam Open, Netherlands	Intl. Gold	Hard (i)	(Switzerland) Roger Federer	(Australia) Wayne Arthurs (Australia) Paul Hanley	6–7^{(4–7)}, 2–6
Win	14–14	Mar 2003	Miami Open, US	Masters	Hard	(Switzerland) Roger Federer	(India) Leander Paes (Czech Republic) David Rikl	7–5, 6–3
Win	15–14	Apr 2003	Estoril Open, Portugal	International	Clay	(India) Mahesh Bhupathi	(Argentina) Lucas Arnold Ker (Argentina) Mariano Hood	6–1, 6–2
Win	16–14	Apr 2003	Monte-Carlo Masters, Monaco	Masters	Clay	(India) Mahesh Bhupathi	(France) Michaël Llodra (France) Fabrice Santoro	6–4, 3–6, 7–6^{(8–6)}
Loss	16–15	May 2003	Hamburg Masters, Germany	Masters	Clay	(India) Mahesh Bhupathi	(The Bahamas) Mark Knowles (Canada) Daniel Nestor	4–6, 6–7^{(10–12)}
Loss	16–16	Jun 2003	Queen's Club Championships, UK	International	Grass	(India) Mahesh Bhupathi	(The Bahamas) Mark Knowles (Canada) Daniel Nestor	3–6, 4–6
Loss	16–17	Jul 2003	Wimbledon, UK	Grand Slam	Hard	(India) Mahesh Bhupathi	(Sweden) Jonas Björkman (Australia) Todd Woodbridge	6–3, 3–6, 6–7^{(4–7)}, 3–6
Win	17–17	Aug 2003	Canadian Open, Canada	Masters	Hard	(India) Mahesh Bhupathi	(Sweden) Jonas Björkman (Australia) Todd Woodbridge	6–3, 7–6^{(7–4)}
Win	18–17	Oct 2003	Kremlin Cup, Russia (3)	International	Carpet (i)	(India) Mahesh Bhupathi	(Zimbabwe) Wayne Black (Zimbabwe) Kevin Ullyett	6–3, 7–5
Loss	18–18	Oct 2003	Vienna Open, Austria	Intl. Gold	Hard (i)	(India) Mahesh Bhupathi	(Switzerland) Yves Allegro (Switzerland) Roger Federer	6–7^{(7–9)}, 5–7
Win	19–18	Oct 2003	Madrid Open, Spain	Masters	Hard (i)	(India) Mahesh Bhupathi	(Zimbabwe) Wayne Black (Zimbabwe) Kevin Ullyett	6–2, 2–6, 6–3
Win	20–18	May 2004	Italian Open, Italy	Masters	Clay	(India) Mahesh Bhupathi	(Australia) Wayne Arthurs (Australia) Paul Hanley	2–6, 6–3, 6–4
Loss	20–19	Aug 2004	Canadian Open, Canada	Masters	Hard	(Sweden) Jonas Björkman	(India) Mahesh Bhupathi (India) Leander Paes	4–6, 2–6
Win	21–19	Apr 2005	Miami Open, US (2)	Masters	Hard	(Sweden) Jonas Björkman	(Zimbabwe) Wayne Black (Zimbabwe) Kevin Ullyett	6–1, 6–2
Win	22–19	May 2005	Hamburg Masters, Germany	Masters	Clay	(Sweden) Jonas Björkman	(France) Michaël Llodra (France) Fabrice Santoro	4–6, 7–6^{(7–2)}, 7–6^{(7–3)}
Win	23–19	Jun 2005	French Open, France	Grand Slam	Clay	(Sweden) Jonas Björkman	(United States) Bob Bryan (United States) Mike Bryan	2–6, 6–1, 6–4
Loss	23–20	Jun 2005	Queen's Club Championships, UK	International	Grass	(Sweden) Jonas Björkman	(United States) Bob Bryan (United States) Mike Bryan	6–7^{(9–11)}, 6–7^{(4–7)}
Win	24–20	Aug 2005	Cincinnati Masters, US	Masters	Hard	(Sweden) Jonas Björkman	(Zimbabwe) Wayne Black (Zimbabwe) Kevin Ullyett	7–6^{(7–3)}, 6–2
Loss	24–21	Sep 2005	US Open, US	Grand Slam	Hard	(Sweden) Jonas Björkman	(United States) Bob Bryan (United States) Mike Bryan	1–6, 4–6
Win	25–21	Oct 2005	Kremlin Cup, Russia (4)	International	Carpet (i)	(Russia) Mikhail Youzhny	(Russia) Igor Andreev (Russia) Nikolay Davydenko	5–1, 5–1
Loss	25–22	Oct 2005	St. Petersburg Open, Russia	International	Carpet (i)	(Sweden) Jonas Björkman	(Austria) Julian Knowle (Austria) Jürgen Melzer	6–4, 5–7, 5–7
Win	26–22	Jan 2006	Qatar Open, Qatar (2)	International	Hard	(Sweden) Jonas Björkman	(Belgium) Christophe Rochus (Belgium) Olivier Rochus	2–6, 6–3, [10–8]
Win	27–22	Apr 2006	Miami Open, US (3)	Masters	Hard	(Sweden) Jonas Björkman	(United States) Bob Bryan (United States) Mike Bryan	6–4, 6–4
Win	28–22	Apr 2006	Monte-Carlo Masters, Monaco (2)	Masters	Clay	(Sweden) Jonas Björkman	(France) Fabrice Santoro (Serbia and Montenegro) Nenad Zimonjić	6–2, 7–6^{(7–2)}
Win	29–22	Jun 2006	French Open, France (2)	Grand Slam	Clay	(Sweden) Jonas Björkman	(United States) Bob Bryan (United States) Mike Bryan	6–7^{(7–5)}, 6–4, 7–5
Loss	29–23	Jun 2006	Queen's Club Championships, UK	International	Grass	(Sweden) Jonas Björkman	(Australia) Paul Hanley (Zimbabwe) Kevin Ullyett	4–6, 6–3, [8–10]
Win	30–23	Jul 2006	Stuttgart Open, Germany	Intl. Gold	Clay	(Argentina) Gastón Gaudio	(Switzerland) Yves Allegro (Sweden) Robert Lindstedt	7–5, 6–7^{(4–7)}, [12–10]
Win	31–23	Aug 2006	Cincinnati Masters, US	Masters	Hard	(Sweden) Jonas Björkman	(United States) Bob Bryan (United States) Mike Bryan	3–6, 6–3, [10–7]
Loss	31–24	Sep 2006	US Open, US	Grand Slam	Hard	(Sweden) Jonas Björkman	(Czech Republic) Martin Damm (India) Leander Paes	7–6^{(7–5)}, 4–6, 3–6
Win	32–24	Nov 2006	Tennis Masters Cup, China	Tour Finals	Hard (i)	(Sweden) Jonas Björkman	(The Bahamas) Mark Knowles (Canada) Daniel Nestor	6–2, 6–4
Loss	32–25	Jan 2007	Australian Open, Australia	Grand Slam	Hard	(Sweden) Jonas Björkman	(United States) Bob Bryan (United States) Mike Bryan	7–5, 7–5
Win	33–25	Oct 2007	Stockholm Open, Sweden	International	Hard (i)	(Sweden) Jonas Björkman	(France) Arnaud Clément (France) Michaël Llodra	6–4, 6–4
Win	34–25	Feb 2008	Delray Beach Open, US (2)	International	Hard	(United Kingdom) Jamie Murray	(United States) Bob Bryan (United States) Mike Bryan	6–4, 3–6, [10–6]
Win	35–25	Oct 2008	Vienna Open, Austria	Intl. Gold	Hard (i)	(Israel) Andy Ram	(Germany) Philipp Petzschner (Austria) Alexander Peya	6–1, 7–5
Loss	35–26	Oct 2008	St. Petersburg Open, Russia	International	Hard (i)	(India) Rohan Bopanna	(United States) Travis Parrott (Slovakia) Filip Polášek	6–3, 6–7^{(4–7)}, [8–10]
Loss	35–27	Mar 2009	Indian Wells Masters, US	Masters 1000	Hard	(Israel) Andy Ram	(United States) Mardy Fish (United States) Andy Roddick	6–3, 1–6, [12–14]
Win	36–27	Apr 2009	Miami Open, US (4)	Masters 1000	Hard	(Israel) Andy Ram	(Australia) Ashley Fisher (Australia) Stephen Huss	6–7^{(4–7)}, 6–2, [10–7]
Loss	36–28	Aug 2009	Canadian Open, Canada	Masters 1000	Hard	(Israel) Andy Ram	(India) Mahesh Bhupathi (The Bahamas) Mark Knowles	4–6, 3–6
Loss	36–29	Nov 2009	ATP World Tour Finals, UK	Tour Finals	Hard (i)	(Israel) Andy Ram	(United States) Bob Bryan (United States) Mike Bryan	6–7^{(5–7)}, 3–6
Loss	36–30	Apr 2010	Miami Open, US	Masters 1000	Hard	(India) Mahesh Bhupathi	(Czech Republic) Lukáš Dlouhý (India) Leander Paes	2–6, 5–7
Loss	36–31	Apr 2010	Monte-Carlo Masters, Monaco	Masters 1000	Clay	(India) Mahesh Bhupathi	(Canada) Daniel Nestor (Serbia) Nenad Zimonjić	3–6, 0–2 ret.
Loss	36–32	Aug 2010	Cincinnati Masters, US	Masters 1000	Hard	(India) Mahesh Bhupathi	(United States) Bob Bryan (United States) Mike Bryan	3–6, 4–6
Loss	36–33	Nov 2010	Valencia Open, Spain	500 Series	Hard (i)	(India) Mahesh Bhupathi	(United Kingdom) Andy Murray (United Kingdom) Jamie Murray	6–7^{(8–10)}, 7–5, [7–10]
Win	37–33	Nov 2010	Paris Masters, France (2)	Masters 1000	Hard (i)	(India) Mahesh Bhupathi	(The Bahamas) Mark Knowles (Israel) Andy Ram	7–5, 7–5
Loss	37–34	Nov 2010	ATP World Tour Finals, UK	Tour Finals	Hard (i)	(India) Mahesh Bhupathi	(Canada) Daniel Nestor (Serbia) Nenad Zimonjić	6–7^{(6–8)}, 4–6
Win	38–34	Feb 2011	U.S. National Indoor, US	500 Series	Hard (i)	(Canada) Daniel Nestor	(United States) Eric Butorac (Curaçao) Jean-Julien Rojer	6–2, 6–7^{(6–8)}, [10–3]
Loss	38–35	Mar 2011	Miami Open, US	Masters 1000	Hard	(Canada) Daniel Nestor	(India) Mahesh Bhupathi (India) Leander Paes	7–6^{(7–5)}, 2–6, [5–10]
Win	39–35	Jun 2011	French Open, France (3)	Grand Slam	Clay	(Canada) Daniel Nestor	(Colombia) Juan Sebastián Cabal (Argentina) Eduardo Schwank	7–6^{(7–3)}, 3–6, 6–4
Win	40–35	Oct 2011	Shanghai Masters, China (2)	Masters 1000	Hard	(Canada) Daniel Nestor	(France) Michaël Llodra (Serbia) Nenad Zimonjić	3–6, 6–1, [12–10]
Loss	40–36	Oct 2011	Vienna Open, Austria	250 Series	Hard (i)	(Canada) Daniel Nestor	(United States) Bob Bryan (United States) Mike Bryan	6–7^{(10–12)}, 3–6
Loss	40–37	Nov 2011	Swiss Indoors, Switzerland	500 Series	Hard (i)	(Canada) Daniel Nestor	(France) Michaël Llodra (Serbia) Nenad Zimonjić	4–6, 5–7
Win	41–37	Nov 2011	ATP Finals, United Kingdom (2)	Tour Finals	Hard (i)	(Canada) Daniel Nestor	(Poland) Mariusz Fyrstenberg (Poland) Marcin Matkowski	7–5, 6–3
Win	42–37	Jan 2012	Brisbane International, Australia	250 Series	Hard	(Canada) Daniel Nestor	(Austria) Jürgen Melzer (Germany) Philipp Petzschner	6–1, 6–2
Win	43–37	Feb 2012	U.S. National Indoor, US (2)	500 Series	Hard (i)	(Canada) Daniel Nestor	(Croatia) Ivan Dodig (Brazil) Marcelo Melo	4–6, 7–5, [10–7]
Loss	43–38	Mar 2012	Miami Open, US	Masters 1000	Hard	(Canada) Daniel Nestor	(India) Leander Paes (Czech Republic) Radek Štěpánek	6–3, 1–6, [8–10]
Loss	43–39	Apr 2012	Monte-Carlo Masters, Monaco	Masters 1000	Clay	(Canada) Daniel Nestor	(United States) Bob Bryan (United States) Mike Bryan	2–6, 3–6
Win	44–39	Jun 2012	French Open, France (4)	Grand Slam	Clay	(Canada) Daniel Nestor	(United States) Bob Bryan (United States) Mike Bryan	6–4, 6–4
Win	45–39	Jun 2012	Queen's Club Championships, UK	250 Series	Grass	(Canada) Daniel Nestor	(United States) Bob Bryan (United States) Mike Bryan	6–3, 6–4
Loss	45–40	Jan 2013	Sydney International, Australia	250 Series	Hard	(Romania) Horia Tecău	(United States) Bob Bryan (United States) Mike Bryan	4–6, 4–6
Loss	45–41	Mar 2013	Delray Beach Open, US	250 Series	Hard	(Romania) Horia Tecău	(United States) James Blake (United States) Jack Sock	4–6, 4–6
Win	46–41	Apr 2013	Romanian Open, Romania	250 Series	Clay	(Romania) Horia Tecău	(Czech Republic) Lukáš Dlouhý (Austria) Oliver Marach	4–6, 6–4, [10–6]
Win	47–41	Jun 2013	Rosmalen Championships, Netherlands	250 Series	Grass	(Romania) Horia Tecău	(Germany) Andre Begemann (Germany) Martin Emmrich	6–3, 7–6^{(7–4)}
Win	48–41	Oct 2013	China Open, China	500 Series	Hard	(Romania) Horia Tecău	(Italy) Fabio Fognini (Italy) Andreas Seppi	6–4, 6–2
Loss	48–42	Mar 2014	Mexican Open, Mexico	500 Series	Hard	(Spain) Feliciano López	(South Africa) Kevin Anderson (Australia) Matthew Ebden	3–6, 3–6
Loss	48–43	Nov 2015	Valencia Open, Spain	250 Series	Hard (i)	(Spain) Feliciano López	(United States) Eric Butorac (United States) Scott Lipsky	6–7^{(4–7)}, 3–6
Win	49–43	Feb 2016	Mexican Open, Mexico	500 Series	Hard	(Philippines) Treat Huey	(Germany) Philipp Petzschner (Austria) Alexander Peya	7–6^{(7–5)}, 6–3
Loss	49–44	Feb 2017	Delray Beach Open, US	250 Series	Hard	(Philippines) Treat Huey	(South Africa) Raven Klaasen (United States) Rajeev Ram	7–5, 7–5
Win	50–44	Oct 2017	Kremlin Cup, Russia (5)	250 Series	Hard (i)	(Austria) Philipp Oswald	(Bosnia and Herzegovina) Damir Džumhur (Croatia) Antonio Šančić	6–3, 7–5
Loss	50–45	Jan 2018	Auckland Open, New Zealand	250 Series	Hard	(Austria) Philipp Oswald	(Austria) Oliver Marach (Croatia) Mate Pavić	4–6, 7–5, [7–10]
Win	51–45	Feb 2018	New York Open, US	250 Series	Hard (i)	(Austria) Philipp Oswald	(Netherlands) Wesley Koolhof (New Zealand) Artem Sitak	6–4, 4–6, [10–6]
Win	52–45	Apr 2018	U.S. Court Championships, US	250 Series	Clay	(Austria) Philipp Oswald	(Germany) Andre Begemann (Croatia) Antonio Šančić	6–7^{(2–7)}, 6–4, [11–9]
Loss	52–46	Oct 2018	Kremlin Cup, Russia	250 Series	Hard (i)	(Austria) Philipp Oswald	(United States) Austin Krajicek (United States) Rajeev Ram	6–7^{(4–7)}, 4–6

== Performance timelines ==
Key
W	F	SF	QF	#R	RR	Q#	DNQ	A	NH

(W) winner; (F) finalist; (SF) semifinalist; (QF) quarterfinalist; (#R) rounds 4, 3, 2, 1; (RR) round-robin stage; (Q#) qualification round; (DNQ) did not qualify; (A) absent; (NH) not held; (SR) strike rate (events won / competed); (W–L) win–loss record.

=== Singles ===
Tournament	1995	1996	1997	1998	1999	2000	2001	2002	2003	2004	2005	2006	2007	2008	SR	W–L
Grand Slam tournaments
Australian Open	A	A	Q2	Q1	Q2	3R	2R	1R	1R	1R	1R	3R	2R	A	0 / 8	6–8
French Open	A	Q1	A	A	2R	1R	1R	1R	1R	1R	1R	2R	1R	A	0 / 9	2–9
Wimbledon	A	Q3	Q2	Q2	Q3	2R	2R	1R	4R	1R	4R	4R	2R	Q2	0 / 8	12–8
US Open	A	Q1	A	Q1	2R	3R	3R	QF	1R	1R	3R	1R	2R	A	0 / 9	12–9
Win–loss	0–0	0–0	0–0	0–0	2–2	5–4	4–4	4–4	3–4	0–4	5–4	6–4	3–4	0–0	0 / 34	32–34
ATP Masters Series
Indian Wells	A	A	A	A	A	3R	1R	1R	3R	3R	2R	1R	1R	2R	0 / 9	7–9
Miami	A	Q2	A	A	A	2R	2R	2R	2R	3R	1R	2R	1R	Q1	0 / 8	5–8
Monte Carlo	A	A	A	A	A	Q2	1R	1R	1R	2R	1R	1R	3R	A	0 / 7	3–7
Rome	A	A	A	A	A	A	1R	1R	2R	2R	1R	1R	Q1	Q1	0 / 6	2–6
Madrid (Stuttgart)	A	A	A	A	A	Q1	F	1R	2R	2R	2R	A	A	A	0 / 5	8–5
Canada	A	A	Q2	Q2	2R	2R	2R	1R	QF	3R	2R	1R	1R	A	0 / 9	9–9
Cincinnati	A	Q1	A	A	Q2	3R	3R	1R	SF	1R	1R	2R	Q1	A	0 / 7	9–7
Paris	A	A	A	A	A	2R	1R	1R	1R	SF	2R	1R	Q1	A	0 / 7	6–7
Hamburg	A	A	A	A	A	2R	2R	SF	1R	1R	1R	QF	Q1	Q1	0 / 7	9–7
Win–loss	0–0	0–0	0–0	0–0	1–1	8–6	10–9	5–9	11–9	11–9	4–9	5–8	2–4	1–1	0 / 65	58–65
Olympic Games
Olympics	NH	A	Not Held			QF	Not Held			3R	Not Held			1R	0 / 3	5–3
Career Statistics
	1995	1996	1997	1998	1999	2000	2001	2002	2003	2004	2005	2006	2007	2008	Career	
Titles	0	0	0	0	0	0	0	0	1	0	0	0	0	0	1	
Finals	0	0	0	0	0	0	1	0	1	0	2	0	0	0	4	
Year-end ranking	399	314	340	274	74	40	35	43	23	47	35	59	152	523		

=== Doubles ===
Tournament	1995	1996	1997	1998	1999	2000	2001	2002	2003	2004	2005	2006	2007	2008	2009	2010	2011	2012	2013	2014	2015	2016	2017	2018	SR	W–L
Grand Slam tournaments
Australian Open	A	A	1R	1R	3R	3R	2R	A	2R	QF	SF	QF	F	1R	2R	1R	SF	SF	2R	QF	QF	QF	2R	2R	0 / 21	42–21
French Open	A	A	1R	A	QF	1R	3R	SF	QF	SF	W	W	QF	1R	1R	2R	W	W	2R	1R	2R	3R	1R	1R	4 / 21	47–17
Wimbledon	A	Q1	1R	1R	2R	1R	SF	QF	F	3R	SF	QF	1R	3R	3R	3R	2R	2R	3R	1R	3R	SF	QF	1R	0 / 22	40–21
US Open	A	A	1R	1R	1R	W	SF	W	QF	3R	F	F	3R	1R	SF	2R	2R	1R	1R	1R	1R	1R	1R	1R	2 / 22	38–20
Win–loss	0–0	0–0	0–4	0–3	6–3	8–3	11–4	13–2	11–4	10–4	19–3	16–3	10–4	2–4	7–4	4–4	12–3	11–3	4–4	3–4	6–4	9–4	4–4	1–4	6 / 86	167–79
Year-end championship
ATP Finals	Did not qualify							NH	RR	RR	RR	W	RR	DNQ	F	F	W	RR	DNQ			RR	DNQ		2 / 10	20–18
ATP Masters series
Indian Wells	A	A	A	A	A	1R	1R	F	QF	SF	SF	SF	SF	SF	F	1R	1R	SF	A	1R	A	1R	2R	1R	0 / 17	28–17
Miami	A	A	A	1R	2R	2R	3R	SF	W	2R	W	W	QF	1R	W	F	F	F	2R	QF	1R	SF	1R	1R	4 / 21	46–17
Monte Carlo	A	A	1R	A	A	2R	1R	1R	W	QF	2R	W	QF	1R	A	F	QF	F	QF	SF	2R	QF	1R	A	2 / 18	25–16
Madrid	Not Held							F	W	SF	1R	SF	SF	2R	2R	A	QF	SF	QF	1R	SF	2R	2R	1R	1 / 16	23–15
Rome	A	A	A	A	A	1R	A	QF	SF	W	SF	SF	2R	2R	QF	2R	2R	QF	SF	2R	A	2R	1R	A	1 / 16	19–15
Canada	A	A	1R	1R	2R	SF	2R	2R	W	F	SF	QF	QF	A	F	SF	SF	QF	2R	A	2R	2R	A	A	1 / 18	26–16
Cincinnati	A	A	A	A	1R	QF	2R	F	SF	SF	W	W	2R	A	2R	F	2R	2R	2R	1R	SF	QF	A	A	2 / 17	29–15
Shanghai	Not Held														2R	QF	W	QF	1R	1R	QF	2R	A	A	1 / 8	8–7
Paris	A	A	A	A	A	W	QF	2R	1R	SF	1R	SF	QF	1R	A	W	SF	QF	SF	1R	1R	1R	A	A	2 / 16	18–14
Hamburg	A	A	A	A	A	2R	QF	A	F	2R	W	QF	QF	1R	Not a Masters 1000 event										1 / 8	12–7
Stuttgart	A	A	A	A	A	2R	W	Not Held																	1 / 2	4–1
Win–loss	0–0	0–0	0–2	0–2	2–3	10–8	10–6	17–8	24–5	18–8	20–6	24–6	11–9	5–7	14–6	16–7	14–8	16–9	11–8	6–8	10–7	10–9	2–5	0–3	16 / 157	238–140
Olympic Games
Olympics	NH	A	Not Held			QF	Not Held			2R	Not Held			A	Not Held			1R	Not Held			1R	Not Held		0 / 4	2–4
Career statistics
	1995	1996	1997	1998	1999	2000	2001	2002	2003	2004	2005	2006	2007	2008	2009	2010	2011	2012	2013	2014	2015	2016	2017	2018	Career	
Titles	0	0	1	0	4	3	2	3	6	1	5	7	1	2	1	1	4	4	3	0	0	1	1	2	52	
Finals	0	0	2	1	4	5	3	10	12	2	8	9	2	3	4	6	7	6	5	1	1	1	2	4	98	
Year-end rank	316	146	94	104	33	9	11	3	1	10	4	3	16	32	11	7	3	7	22	47	28	21	41	55	$11,763,620	

=== Mixed doubles ===
Tournament	1997	1998	1999	2000	2001	2002	2003	2004	2005	2006	2007	2008	2009	2010	2011	2012	2013	2014	2015	2016	2017	2018	SR	W–L
Grand Slam tournaments
Australian Open	A	SF	F	A	1R	A	1R	A	SF	A	F	1R	1R	2R	1R	1R	2R	2R	1R	1R	1R	1R	0 / 17	16–17
French Open	A	A	A	A	2R	A	A	A	1R	2R	1R	1R	SF	QF	2R	QF	1R	1R	1R	QF	1R	1R	0 / 15	12–15
Wimbledon	2R	W	2R	A	2R	A	A	A	A	SF	1R	3R	3R	3R	2R	3R	2R	F	1R	2R	3R	A	1 / 16	23–15
US Open	A	W	A	F	1R	A	A	QF	A	2R	W	1R	1R	A	1R	SF	W	2R	QF	2R	A	A	3 / 14	27–11
Win–loss	1–1	13–1	5–2	4–1	2–4	0–0	0–1	2–1	2–2	9–4	5–3	2–4	4–4	4–3	1–4	6–4	6–3	6–4	2–4	3–4	1–3	0–2	4 / 62	78–58
Olympic Games
Olympics	Not Held															G	Not Held			A	Not Held		1 / 1	4–0

== Top 10 wins ==
Season	1995	1996	1997	1998	1999	2000	2001	2002	2003	2004	2005	2006	2007	2008	Total
Wins	0	0	0	0	0	1	7	0	5	1	1	1	0	0	16

#	Player	Rank	Event	Surface	Rd	Score	MR
2000
1.	(Australia) Lleyton Hewitt	7	Summer Olympics, Sydney, Australia	Hard	1R	6–3, 6–3	53
2001
2.	(Sweden) Magnus Norman	5	Marseille, France	Hard (i)	2R	6–2, 3–6, 6–3	52
3.	(Russia) Marat Safin	1	Rotterdam, Netherlands	Hard (i)	1R	6–7^{(7–9)}, 6–4, 6–3	41
4.	(Brazil) Gustavo Kuerten	1	Hamburg, Germany	Clay	1R	6–3, 3–6, 7–6^{(7–5)}	54
5.	(Russia) Yevgeny Kafelnikov	7	Indianapolis, United States	Hard	2R	6–3, 6–3	47
6.	(Brazil) Gustavo Kuerten	1	Stuttgart, Germany	Hard (i)	2R	4–6, 7–6^{(8–6)}, 6–4	53
7.	(United States) Pete Sampras	10	Stuttgart, Germany	Hard (i)	QF	6–4, 6–2	53
8.	(Russia) Yevgeny Kafelnikov	6	Stuttgart, Germany	Hard (i)	SF	7–6^{(7–3)}, 6–3	53
2003
9.	(Switzerland) Roger Federer	5	Rotterdam, Netherlands	Hard (i)	SF	5–7, 6–3, 6–4	46
10.	(Australia) Lleyton Hewitt	5	Montreal, Canada	Hard	2R	7–5, 6–7^{(4–7)}, 7–5	32
11.	(Thailand) Paradorn Srichaphan	9	Montreal, Canada	Hard	3R	6–3, 6–2	32
12.	(Argentina) Guillermo Coria	5	Cincinnati, United States	Hard	QF	6–2, 7–5	26
13.	(Germany) Rainer Schüttler	8	Davis Cup, Sundern, Germany	Clay	RR	6–3, 7–5, 6–3	27
2004
14.	(United States) Andy Roddick	2	Paris, France	Carpet (i)	3R	7–6^{(7–2)}, 6–2	71
2005
15.	(Spain) Carlos Moyá	7	Barcelona, Spain	Clay	3R	6–4, 6–4	44
2006
16.	(United States) James Blake	7	Wimbledon, London, United Kingdom	Grass	3R	6–4, 3–6, 4–6, 6–1, 6–0	53

== Doubles partners ==
Years	Partner
1995	(Belarus) Evgeni Mikheev
1995; 1998–2008	(Belarus) (Belarus) Vladimir Voltchkov
1996–97	(Austria) Georg Blumauer
1996	(Finland) Tuomas Ketola
1996	(Israel) Lior Mor
1996	(Australia) Ben Ellwood
1996	(United States) Scott Humphries
1996	(Mexico) Alejandro Hernández
1996	(South Africa) Robbie Koenig
1996	(Germany) Lars Rehmann
1996	(Slovakia) Martin Hromec
1996	(Brazil) Jaime Oncins
1996–97	(The Bahamas) Mark Merklein
1996–98	(Zimbabwe) Kevin Ullyett
1997	(South Africa) Brent Haygarth
1997	(Hungary) Gábor Köves
1997	(United States) Kent Kinnear
1997	(Sweden) Peter Nyborg
1997	(South Africa) John-Laffnie de Jager
1997	(France) Jean-Philippe Fleurian
1997–98	(Russia) Andrei Cherkasov
1997–98	(United States) Justin Gimelstob
1997	(South Africa) Myles Wakefield
1998	(United States) Jeff Tarango
1998; 2004	(Armenia) Sargis Sargsian
1998	(France) Olivier Delaître
1998	(Australia) Peter Tramacchi
1998	(Russia) Denis Golovanov
1998	(Federal Republic of Yugoslavia) Dušan Vemić
1998	(United States) Michael Sell
1998–99	(Russia) Andrei Olhovskiy
1998–99	(Czech Republic) Daniel Vacek
1998	(South Africa) David Adams
1998–99	(United States) Alexander Reichel
1998	(Brazil) Gustavo Kuerten
1998	(Czech Republic) Pavel Vízner
1998–2001; 2004; 2006	(Federal Republic of Yugoslavia) (Serbia and Montenegro) Nenad Zimonjić
1999; 2001	(Russia) Yevgeny Kafelnikov
1999; 2001	(Australia) Sandon Stolle
1999–00	(Czech Republic) Martin Damm
1999	(Philippines) Eric Taino
2000	(The Bahamas) Mark Knowles
2000; 2011–12	(Canada) Daniel Nestor
2000	(Germany) Nicolas Kiefer
2000; 2004–07	(Sweden) Jonas Björkman
2000	(Australia) Lleyton Hewitt
2000; 2004	(Russia) Marat Safin
2000–01	(Sweden) Nicklas Kulti
2001	(United States) Jonathan Stark
2001; 2004	(Belarus) Alexander Shvets
2001	(Germany) David Prinosil
2001–02	(Germany) Tommy Haas
2001	(Australia) Patrick Rafter
2001; 2004	(France) Fabrice Santoro
2002	(France) Michaël Llodra
2002	(France) Julien Boutter
2002–03	(Switzerland) Roger Federer
2002–04; 2010	(India) Mahesh Bhupathi
2003	(United States) Jeff Morrison
2003	(United States) Jared Palmer
2003	(United States) Mardy Fish
2004	(United States) Amer Delić
2004–05; 2014; 2017	(Russia) Mikhail Youzhny
2005	(Austria) Jürgen Melzer
2005	(Sweden) Thomas Johansson
2006	(Spain) Fernando Verdasco
2006	(Argentina) Gastón Gaudio
2007	(Germany) Mischa Zverev
2007–08	(Spain) Tommy Robredo
2008	(United Kingdom) Jamie Murray
2008–09	(Belarus) Sergey Betov
2008–09	(Israel) Andy Ram
2008	(India) Rohan Bopanna
2008	(Croatia) Marin Čilić
2009	(United States) Robert Kendrick
2009	(Australia) Ashley Fisher
2009–10; 2012	(Belarus) Aliaksandr Bury
2010–11	(Belarus) Uladzimir Ignatik
2013	(Romania) Horia Tecău
2015	(Spain) Feliciano López
2016	(Philippines) (United States) Treat Huey
2017	(Poland) Marcin Matkowski
2018	(Austria) Philipp Oswald

== Notes ==
Olympic Games
Preceded by Alexandr Romankov	Flagbearer for Belarus; London 2012	Succeeded by Vasil Kiryienka
