= 2010 BNP Paribas Masters – Doubles =

Doubles
- 2010 BNP Paribas Masters

Final
- Champions: (India) Mahesh Bhupathi; (Belarus) Max Mirnyi
- Runners-up: (The Bahamas) Mark Knowles; (Israel) Andy Ram
- Score: 7–5, 7–5

Details
- Draw: 24
- Seeds: 8

Events
Singles	Doubles
← 2009 ·	BNP Paribas Masters	· 2011 →

Daniel Nestor and Nenad Zimonjić were the defending champions, but lost to Mahesh Bhupathi and Max Mirnyi in the quarterfinals.
Bhupathi and Mirnyi won this tournament, by defeating Mark Knowles and Andy Ram 7–5, 7–5 in the final.

== Seeds ==
All seeds received a bye into the second round.

1. (United States) Bob Bryan / (United States) Mike Bryan (semifinals)
2. (Canada) Daniel Nestor / (Serbia) Nenad Zimonjić (quarterfinals)
3. (Czech Republic) Lukáš Dlouhý / (India) Leander Paes (quarterfinals)
4. (Poland) Łukasz Kubot / (Austria) Oliver Marach (quarterfinals)
5. (Poland) Mariusz Fyrstenberg / (Poland) Marcin Matkowski (second round)
6. (India) Mahesh Bhupathi / (Belarus) Max Mirnyi (champions)
7. (India) Rohan Bopanna / (Pakistan) Aisam-ul-Haq Qureshi (second round)
8. (Czech Republic) František Čermák / (Slovakia) Michal Mertiňák (semifinals)

== Draw ==
=== Key ===
- Q = Qualifier
- WC = Wild card
- LL = Lucky loser
- Alt = Alternate
- SE = Special exempt
- PR = Protected ranking
- ITF = ITF entry
- JE = Junior exempt
- w/o = Walkover
- r = Retired
- d = Defaulted
- SR = Special ranking

=== Finals ===
Semifinals

Final

1
- (United States) Bob Bryan
- (United States) Mike Bryan
3
7
[6]

- (The Bahamas) Mark Knowles
- (Israel) Andy Ram
6
6^{5}
[10]

- (The Bahamas) Mark Knowles
- (Israel) Andy Ram
5
5

6
- (India) Mahesh Bhupathi
- (Belarus) Max Mirnyi
7
7

8
- (Czech Republic) František Čermák
- (Slovakia) Michal Mertiňák
3
3

6
- (India) Mahesh Bhupathi
- (Belarus) Max Mirnyi
6
6

=== Top half ===
First round

Second round

Quarterfinals

Semifinals

1
- (United States) B Bryan
- (United States) M Bryan
7
7

- (Kazakhstan) A Golubev
- (Uzbekistan) D Istomin
3
7
[10]

- (Croatia) M Čilić
- (Croatia) I Ljubičić
6^{3}
5

- (Croatia) M Čilić
- (Croatia) I Ljubičić
6
6^{3}
[12]

1
- (United States) B Bryan
- (United States) M Bryan
7
7

- (South Africa) W Moodie
- (Belgium) D Norman
6
6

- (South Africa) W Moodie
- (Belgium) D Norman
6^{2}
6^{5}

- (Sweden) R Lindstedt
- (Romania) H Tecău
3
4

- (South Africa) W Moodie
- (Belgium) D Norman
7
7

5
- (Poland) M Fyrstenberg
- (Poland) M Matkowski
6^{5}
6^{6}

1
- (United States) B Bryan
- (United States) M Bryan
3
7
[6]

- (The Bahamas) M Knowles
- (Israel) A Ram
6
6^{5}
[10]

3
- (Czech Republic) L Dlouhý
- (India) L Paes
6^{3}
7
[10]

- (United States) J Isner
- (United States) S Querrey
7
4
[10]

- (United States) J Isner
- (United States) S Querrey
7
5
[6]

- (Brazil) T Bellucci
- (Brazil) M Melo
6^{5}
6
[0]

3
- (Czech Republic) L Dlouhý
- (India) L Paes
1
4

- (Spain) M Granollers
- (Spain) S Ventura
4
6
[7]

- (The Bahamas) M Knowles
- (Israel) A Ram
6
6

- (The Bahamas) M Knowles
- (Israel) A Ram
6
4
[10]

- (The Bahamas) M Knowles
- (Israel) A Ram
6
6

7
- (India) R Bopanna
- (Pakistan) A-u-H Qureshi
3
2

=== Bottom half ===
First round

Second round

Quarterfinals

Semifinals

8
- (Czech Republic) F Čermák
- (Slovakia) M Mertiňák
w/o

- (Ukraine) S Stakhovsky
- (Russia) M Youzhny
6
3
[10]

- (Ukraine) S Stakhovsky
- (Russia) M Youzhny

- (Sweden) S Aspelin
- (Australia) P Hanley
3
6
[4]

8
- (Czech Republic) F Čermák
- (Slovakia) M Mertiňák
7
4
[11]

- (Spain) N Almagro
- (Spain) D Marrero
6
5
[10]

4
(Poland) Ł Kubot
(Austria) O Marach
5
6
[9]

- (Germany) C Kas
- (Germany) P Kohlschreiber
4
7
[8]

- (Spain) N Almagro
- (Spain) D Marrero
0
3

4
(Poland) Ł Kubot
(Austria) O Marach
6
6

8
- (Czech Republic) F Čermák
- (Slovakia) M Mertiňák
3
3

6
- (India) M Bhupathi
- (Belarus) M Mirnyi
6
6

6
- (India) M Bhupathi
- (Belarus) M Mirnyi
3
6
[10]

- (Israel) J Erlich
- (Germany) M Kohlmann
6
3
[10]

- (Israel) J Erlich
- (Germany) M Kohlmann
6
1
[5]

WC
(France) R Gasquet
(France) É Roger-Vasselin
3
6
[5]

6
- (India) M Bhupathi
- (Belarus) M Mirnyi
6^{8}
6
[10]

ALT
- (Germany) M Berrer
- (Colombia) S Giraldo
5
3

2
- (Canada) D Nestor
- (Serbia) N Zimonjić
7
4
[7]

WC
- (France) A Clément
- (France) M Llodra
7
6

WC
- (France) A Clément
- (France) M Llodra
4
4

2
- (Canada) D Nestor
- (Serbia) N Zimonjić
6
6
