= 2010 BNP Paribas Masters – Singles =

Singles
- 2010 BNP Paribas Masters

Final
- Champion: (Sweden) Robin Söderling
- Runner-up: (France) Gaël Monfils
- Score: 6–1, 7–6^{(7–1)}

Details
- Draw: 48 (6 Q / 3 WC)
- Seeds: 16

Events
Singles	Doubles
← 2009 ·	BNP Paribas Masters	· 2011 →

Robin Söderling defeated Gaël Monfils in the final, 6–1, 7–6^{(7–1)} to win the singles tennis title at the 2010 Paris Masters. Both players saved match points en route to the final; Söderling saved three in his semifinal against Michaël Llodra, while Monfils saved five in his semifinal against Roger Federer.

Novak Djokovic was the defending champion, but lost in the third round to Llodra.

== Seeds ==
All seeds received a bye into the second round.

1. (Switzerland) Roger Federer (semifinals)
2. (Serbia) Novak Djokovic (third round)
3. (United Kingdom) Andy Murray (quarterfinals)
4. (Sweden) Robin Söderling (champion)
5. (Czech Republic) Tomáš Berdych (third round)
6. (Spain) Fernando Verdasco (third round)
7. (Spain) David Ferrer (third round)
8. (United States) Andy Roddick (quarterfinals)
9. (Russia) Mikhail Youzhny (second round, retired due to a back injury)
10. (Russia) Nikolay Davydenko (quarterfinals)
11. (Austria) Jürgen Melzer (quarterfinals)
12. (France) Gaël Monfils (final)
13. (Croatia) Marin Čilić (third round)
14. (Spain) Nicolás Almagro (second round)
15. (Croatia) Ivan Ljubičić (second round)
16. (United States) John Isner (second round)

== Draw ==
=== Key ===
- Q = Qualifier
- WC = Wild card
- LL = Lucky loser
- Alt = Alternate
- SE = Special exempt
- PR = Protected ranking
- ITF = ITF entry
- JE = Junior exempt
- w/o = Walkover
- r = Retired
- d = Defaulted
- SR = Special ranking

=== Finals ===
Quarterfinals
1	(Switzerland) Roger Federer	6	7^{7}
11	(Austria) Jürgen Melzer	1	6^{4}
3	(United Kingdom) Andy Murray	2	6	3
12	(France) Gaël Monfils	6	2	6
8	(United States) Andy Roddick	5	4
4	(Sweden) Robin Söderling	7	6
10	(Russia) Nikolay Davydenko	5	1
(France) Michaël Llodra	7	6

Semifinals
1	(Switzerland) Roger Federer	6^{7}	7^{7}	6^{4}
12	(France) Gaël Monfils	7^{9}	6^{1}	7^{7}
4	(Sweden) Robin Söderling	6^{0}	7	7^{8}
(France) Michaël Llodra	7^{7}	5	6^{6}

Final
12	(France) Gaël Monfils	1	6^{1}
4	(Sweden) Robin Söderling	6	7^{7}

=== Top half ===
==== Section 1 ====
First round
WC	(France) N Mahut	5	6	6^{7}
(France) R Gasquet	7	4	7^{9}
LL	(United States) M Russell	2	0
(Czech Republic) R Štěpánek	6	6
(Netherlands) T de Bakker	7^{7}	4	5
Q	(Colombia) S Giraldo	6^{3}	6	7
(Germany) M Berrer	5	6	4
Q	(Italy) F Fognini	7	3	6

Second round
1	(Switzerland) R Federer	6	6
(France) R Gasquet	4	4
(Czech Republic) R Štěpánek	7^{7}	6
14	(Spain) N Almagro	6^{3}	4
11	(Austria) J Melzer	6	7^{8}
Q	(Colombia) S Giraldo	3	6^{6}
Q	(Italy) F Fognini	6	4	6^{4}
7	(Spain) D Ferrer	3	6	7^{7}

Third round
1	(Switzerland) R Federer	6	6
(Czech Republic) R Štěpánek	4	3
11	(Austria) J Melzer	7^{8}	2	6
7	(Spain) D Ferrer	6^{6}	6	3

Quarterfinals
1	(Switzerland) R Federer	6	7^{7}
11	(Austria) J Melzer	1	6^{4}

==== Section 2 ====
First round
SE	(Spain) M Granollers	3	1
(Argentina) D Nalbandian	6	6
(Ukraine) S Stakhovsky	6	6
Q	(Ukraine) I Marchenko	2	2
(Uzbekistan) D Istomin	4	4
Q	(Germany) B Becker	6	6
WC	(France) A Clément	6^{8}	7^{9}	6
(Spain) F López	7^{10}	6^{7}	3

Second round
3	(United Kingdom) A Murray	2	6	6
(Argentina) D Nalbandian	6	4	3
(Ukraine) S Stakhovsky	4	6	3
13	(Croatia) M Čilić	6	4	6
12	(France) G Monfils	7^{7}	6
Q	(Germany) B Becker	6^{4}	4
WC	(France) A Clément	6	3	0
6	(Spain) F Verdasco	3	6	6

Third round
3	(United Kingdom) A Murray	7^{8}	3	6
13	(Croatia) M Čilić	6^{6}	6	3
12	(France) G Monfils	6^{4}	7^{7}	7
6	(Spain) F Verdasco	7^{7}	6^{2}	5

Quarterfinals
3	(United Kingdom) A Murray	2	6	3
12	(France) G Monfils	6	2	6

=== Bottom half ===
==== Section 3 ====
First round
(Belgium) X Malisse	4	3
Q	(Finland) J Nieminen	6	6
(Latvia) E Gulbis	7	2
(Argentina) JI Chela	5	2	r
(Switzerland) S Wawrinka	6	7
Q	(France) J Ouanna	3	5
(Kazakhstan) A Golubev	6	4	3
(France) G Simon	3	6	6

Second round
8	(United States) A Roddick	6	6
Q	(Finland) J Nieminen	1	4
(Latvia) E Gulbis	6	3
9	(Russia) M Youzhny	4	0	r
15	(Croatia) I Ljubičić	4	4
(Switzerland) S Wawrinka	6	6
(France) G Simon	4	0
4	(Sweden) R Söderling	6	6

Third round
8	(United States) A Roddick	6	7^{10}
(Latvia) E Gulbis	3	6^{8}
(Switzerland) S Wawrinka	6^{3}	3
4	(Sweden) R Söderling	7^{7}	6

Quarterfinals
8	(United States) A Roddick	5	4
4	(Sweden) R Söderling	7	6

==== Section 4 ====
First round
(Spain) A Montañés	6	1	6^{3}
WC	(France) F Serra	4	6	7^{7}
(Germany) P Kohlschreiber	6^{5}	7	3
(Brazil) T Bellucci	7^{7}	5	6
(Italy) P Starace	4	1
(France) M Llodra	6	6
(Argentina) J Mónaco	7^{9}	6
(United States) S Querrey	6^{7}	2

Second round
5	(Czech Republic) T Berdych	6	6
WC	(France) F Serra	3	1
(Brazil) T Bellucci	3	0
10	(Russia) N Davydenko	6	6
16	(United States) J Isner	3	4
(France) M Llodra	6	6
(Argentina) J Mónaco	4	3
2	(Serbia) N Djokovic	6	6

Third round
5	(Czech Republic) T Berdych	6	6^{5}	0
10	(Russia) N Davydenko	4	7^{7}	6
(France) M Llodra	7^{8}	6
2	(Serbia) N Djokovic	6^{6}	2

Quarterfinals
10	(Russia) N Davydenko	5	1
(France) M Llodra	7	6

== Qualifying ==
=== Seeds ===
1. (Finland) Jarkko Nieminen (qualified)
2. (Italy) Andreas Seppi (first round)
3. (Germany) Benjamin Becker (qualified)
4. (Spain) Daniel Gimeno Traver (first round)
5. (Italy) Fabio Fognini (qualified)
6. (Colombia) Santiago Giraldo (qualified)
7. (Germany) Tobias Kamke (first round)
8. (Ukraine) Illya Marchenko (qualified)
9. (United States) Michael Russell (qualifying competition, lucky loser)
10. (Germany) Mischa Zverev (first round, retired due to left leg injury)
11. (Turkey) Marsel İlhan (first round)
12. (Czech Republic) Jan Hájek (first round)

=== Qualifiers ===
1. (Finland) Jarkko Nieminen
2. (Ukraine) Illya Marchenko
3. (Germany) Benjamin Becker
4. (France) Josselin Ouanna
5. (Italy) Fabio Fognini
6. (Colombia) Santiago Giraldo

=== Lucky loser ===
1. (United States) Michael Russell

=== Draw ===
==== First qualifier ====
First round
1	(Finland) Jarkko Nieminen	6	4	6
(Russia) Teymuraz Gabashvili	2	6	3
(France) Marc Gicquel	6	6
7	(Germany) Tobias Kamke	2	4

Qualifying competition
1	(Finland) Jarkko Nieminen	6	6
(France) Marc Gicquel	2	1

==== Second qualifier ====
First round
2	(Italy) Andreas Seppi	3	7	4
(Spain) Albert Ramos Viñolas	6	5	6
(France) Benoît Paire	6	5	3
8	(Ukraine) Illya Marchenko	3	7	6

Qualifying competition
(Spain) Albert Ramos Viñolas	1	2
8	(Ukraine) Illya Marchenko	6	6

==== Third qualifier ====
First round
3	(Germany) Benjamin Becker	6	7^{7}
WC	(France) Laurent Rochette	1	6^{3}
(France) Édouard Roger-Vasselin	4
10	(Germany) Mischa Zverev	0^{r}

Qualifying competition
3	(Germany) Benjamin Becker	6	7^{7}
(France) Édouard Roger-Vasselin	4	6^{5}

==== Fourth qualifier ====
First round
4	(Spain) Daniel Gimeno Traver	7^{7}	5	4
(France) Josselin Ouanna	6^{5}	7	6
WC	(France) Clément Reix	6	6
11	(Turkey) Marsel İlhan	4	4

Qualifying competition
(France) Josselin Ouanna	6	7
WC	(France) Clément Reix	2	5

==== Fifth qualifier ====
First round
5	(Italy) Fabio Fognini	6	6
(Spain) Roberto Bautista Agut	2	4
(Switzerland) Stéphane Bohli	7^{7}	6
12	(Czech Republic) Jan Hájek	6^{1}	2

Qualifying competition
5	(Italy) Fabio Fognini	7^{7}	6
(Switzerland) Stéphane Bohli	6^{4}	3

==== Sixth qualifier ====
First round
6	(Colombia) Santiago Giraldo	6	7^{7}
WC	(France) Romain Jouan	4	6^{4}
WC	(France) Vincent Millot	7^{7}	1	4
9	(United States) Michael Russell	6^{3}	6	6

Qualifying competition
6	(Colombia) Santiago Giraldo	6	6
9	(United States) Michael Russell	4	2
