= 2010 Western & Southern Financial Group Masters – Doubles =

Doubles
- 2010 Western & Southern Financial Group Masters

Final
- Champion: (United States) Bob Bryan (United States) Mike Bryan
- Runner-up: (India) Mahesh Bhupathi (Belarus) Max Mirnyi
- Score: 6–3, 6–4

Events
Singles	Doubles
← 2009 ·	Western & Southern Financial Group Masters	· 2011 →

Daniel Nestor and Nenad Zimonjić were the defending champions, but they lost to František Čermák and Michal Mertiňák 7–5, 6–2 in the first round.
Bob Bryan and Mike Bryan won in the final against Mahesh Bhupathi and Max Mirnyi, 6–3, 6–4.

== Seeds ==
1. (Canada) Daniel Nestor / (Serbia) Nenad Zimonjić (second round)
2. (United States) Bob Bryan / (United States) Mike Bryan (champions)
3. (Czech Republic) Lukáš Dlouhý / (India) Leander Paes (second round)
4. (India) Mahesh Bhupathi / (Belarus) Max Mirnyi (final)
5. (Poland) Łukasz Kubot / (Austria) Oliver Marach (semifinals)
6. (Austria) Julian Knowle / (Israel) Andy Ram (quarterfinals)
7. (Austria) Jürgen Melzer / (Germany) Philipp Petzschner (second round)
8. (Poland) Mariusz Fyrstenberg / (Poland) Marcin Matkowski (quarterfinals)

== Draw ==
=== Key ===
- Q = Qualifier
- WC = Wild card
- LL = Lucky loser
- Alt = Alternate
- SE = Special exempt
- PR = Protected ranking
- ITF = ITF entry
- JE = Junior exempt
- w/o = Walkover
- r = Retired
- d = Defaulted
- SR = Special ranking

=== Finals ===
Semifinals
5	(Poland) Łukasz Kubot (Austria) Oliver Marach	3	4
4	(India) Mahesh Bhupathi (Belarus) Max Mirnyi	6	6
(South Africa) Wesley Moodie (Belgium) Dick Norman	6^{8}	5
2	(United States) Bob Bryan (United States) Mike Bryan	7^{10}	7

Final
4	(India) Mahesh Bhupathi (Belarus) Max Mirnyi	3	4
2	(United States) Bob Bryan (United States) Mike Bryan	6	6

=== Top half ===
First round
(Spain) N Almagro (Serbia) J Tipsarević	0	4
(Czech Republic) F Čermák (Slovakia) M Mertiňák	6	6
(Brazil) T Bellucci (Brazil) M Melo	6^{4}	3
(Spain) F López (Spain) F Verdasco	7^{7}	6
(Sweden) S Aspelin (Australia) P Hanley	6^{6}	6	[7]
(United States) J Isner (United States) S Querrey	7^{8}	3	[10]
WC	(United States) R Ram (United States) B Reynolds	3	6	[4]
(India) R Bopanna (Pakistan) A-u-H Qureshi	6	1	[10]

Second round
1	(Canada) D Nestor (Serbia) N Zimonjić	5	2
(Czech Republic) F Čermák (Slovakia) M Mertiňák	7	6
(Spain) F López (Spain) F Verdasco	4	7	[4]
5	(Poland) Ł Kubot (Austria) O Marach	6	5	[10]
4	(India) M Bhupathi (Belarus) M Mirnyi
(United States) J Isner (United States) S Querrey	w/o
(India) R Bopanna (Pakistan) A-u-H Qureshi	5	6^{3}
8	(Poland) M Fyrstenberg (Poland) M Matkowski	7	7^{7}

Quarterfinals
(Czech Republic) F Čermák (Slovakia) M Mertiňák	4	2
5	(Poland) Ł Kubot (Austria) O Marach	6	6
4	(India) M Bhupathi (Belarus) M Mirnyi	6	6
8	(Poland) M Fyrstenberg (Poland) M Matkowski	3	2

Semifinals
5	(Poland) Ł Kubot (Austria) O Marach	3	4
4	(India) M Bhupathi (Belarus) M Mirnyi	6	6

=== Bottom half ===
First round
(South Africa) W Moodie (Belgium) D Norman	7^{7}	6
(Sweden) R Lindstedt (Romania) H Tecău	6^{5}	2
(Germany) P Kohlschreiber (France) G Monfils	3	2
(United States) M Fish (The Bahamas) M Knowles	6	6
WC	(United States) R Ginepri (United States) R Sweeting	2	3
(Spain) T Robredo (Czech Republic) R Štěpánek	6	6
(Ukraine) S Stakhovsky (Russia) M Youzhny	4	1
(France) J Benneteau (France) M Llodra	6	6

Second round
7	(Austria) J Melzer (Germany) P Petzschner	3	2
(South Africa) W Moodie (Belgium) D Norman	6	6
(United States) M Fish (The Bahamas) M Knowles	6	6
3	(Czech Republic) L Dlouhý (India) L Paes	3	2
6	(Austria) J Knowle (Israel) A Ram	6^{3}	6	[10]
(Spain) T Robredo (Czech Republic) R Štěpánek	7^{7}	1	[8]
(France) J Benneteau (France) M Llodra	4	2
2	(United States) B Bryan (United States) M Bryan	6	6

Quarterfinals
(South Africa) W Moodie (Belgium) D Norman	6	3	[12]
(United States) M Fish (The Bahamas) M Knowles	4	6	[10]
6	(Austria) J Knowle (Israel) A Ram	5	7^{7}	[4]
2	(United States) B Bryan (United States) M Bryan	7	6^{4}	[10]

Semifinals
(South Africa) W Moodie (Belgium) D Norman	6^{8}	5
2	(United States) B Bryan (United States) M Bryan	7^{10}	7
