= 2010 Western & Southern Financial Group Masters – Singles =

Singles
- 2010 Western & Southern Financial Group Masters

Final
- Champion: (Switzerland) Roger Federer
- Runner-up: (United States) Mardy Fish
- Score: 6–7^{(5–7)}, 7–6^{(7–1)}, 6–4

Events
Singles	Doubles
- Western & Southern Financial Group Masters

Defending champion Roger Federer defeated Mardy Fish in the final, 6–7^{(5–7)}, 7–6^{(7–1)}, 6–4 to win the men's singles tennis title at the 2010 Cincinnati Masters. It was his fourth Cincinnati Masters title, his record-equaling 17th Masters title overall (tying Andre Agassi's tally), and his 63rd career title overall (tying Björn Borg's tally).

Rafael Nadal also made his record 20th consecutive Masters quarterfinal, a streak dating back to the 2008 Canada Masters.

== Seeds ==
The top eight seeds receive a bye into the second round.

1. (Spain) Rafael Nadal (quarterfinals)
2. (Serbia) Novak Djokovic (quarterfinals)
3. (Switzerland) Roger Federer (champion)
4. (United Kingdom) Andy Murray (quarterfinals)
5. (Sweden) Robin Söderling (third round)
6. (Russia) Nikolay Davydenko (quarterfinals)
7. (Czech Republic) Tomáš Berdych (third round)
8. (Spain) Fernando Verdasco (second round)
9. (United States) Andy Roddick (semifinals)
10. (Spain) David Ferrer (third round)
11. (Croatia) Marin Čilić (first round)
12. (Russia) Mikhail Youzhny (first round)
13. (Austria) Jürgen Melzer (second round)
14. (Spain) Nicolás Almagro (first round)
15. (Croatia) Ivan Ljubičić (first round)
16. (France) Gaël Monfils (first round)

== Main draw ==
Key

- Q = Qualifier
- WC = Wild card
- LL = Lucky loser
- Alt = Alternate
- ITF = ITF entry
- PR = Protected ranking
- SR = Special ranking
- SE = Special exempt
- JE = Junior exempt
- JR = Junior Accelerator Programme entrant
- CO = College Accelerator Programme entrant
- NG = Next Gen Accelerator Program entrant
- w/o = Walkover
- r = Retired
- d = Defaulted

=== Finals ===
Quarterfinals
1	(Spain) Rafael Nadal	4	6	4
(Cyprus) Marcos Baghdatis	6	4	6
3	(Switzerland) Roger Federer	6	7
6	(Russia) Nikolay Davydenko	4	5
WC	(United States) Mardy Fish	6^{7}	6	7^{7}
4	(United Kingdom) Andy Murray	7^{9}	1	6^{5}
9	(United States) Andy Roddick	6	7
2	(Serbia) Novak Djokovic	4	5

Semifinals
(Cyprus) Marcos Baghdatis	4	3
3	(Switzerland) Roger Federer	6	6
WC	(United States) Mardy Fish	4	7^{7}	6
9	(United States) Andy Roddick	6	6^{3}	1

Final
3	(Switzerland) Roger Federer	6^{5}	7^{7}	6
WC	(United States) Mardy Fish	7^{7}	6^{1}	4

=== Top half ===
==== Section 1 ====
First round
Q	(United States) T Dent	6	6
(Spain) F López	3	2
(France) M Llodra	6	3	2
(France) J Benneteau	3	6	6
(Switzerland) S Wawrinka	6	6
14	(Spain) N Almagro	3	3
11	(Croatia) M Čilić	4	5
(Cyprus) M Baghdatis	6	7
(Brazil) T Bellucci	7^{8}	7
Q	(Germany) B Becker	6^{6}	5
(France) P-H Mathieu	6^{6}	7^{7}	6
(Romania) V Hănescu	7^{8}	6^{2}	3

Second round
1	(Spain) R Nadal	6	7
Q	(United States) T Dent	2	5
(France) J Benneteau	6	6
(Switzerland) S Wawrinka	4	2
(Cyprus) M Baghdatis	6	4	7^{7}
(Brazil) T Bellucci	2	6	6^{4}
(France) P-H Mathieu	4	4
7	(Czech Republic) T Berdych	6	6

Third round
1	(Spain) R Nadal	5	7^{8}	6
(France) J Benneteau	7	6^{6}	2
(Cyprus) M Baghdatis	7	6
7	(Czech Republic) T Berdych	5	4

Quarterfinals
1	(Spain) R Nadal	4	6	4
(Cyprus) M Baghdatis	6	4	6

==== Section 2 ====
First round
Q	(Uzbekistan) D Istomin	6	6
WC	(United States) J Blake	3	0
(Argentina) H Zeballos	7^{7}	3	4
(Germany) P Kohlschreiber	6^{2}	6	6
Q	(Colombia) A Falla	6	6
16	(France) G Monfils	3	4
10	(Spain) D Ferrer	3	6	6
(Ukraine) A Dolgopolov	6	3	4
(United States) S Querrey	6	6
(Germany) P Petzschner	1	4
WC	(United States) R Ginepri	6^{3}	7^{7}	6
Q	(India) S Devvarman	7^{7}	6^{4}	2

Second round
3	(Switzerland) R Federer	5
Q	(Uzbekistan) D Istomin	2^{r}
(Germany) P Kohlschreiber	6	1	6
Q	(Colombia) A Falla	0	6	3
10	(Spain) D Ferrer	7	6
(United States) S Querrey	5	2
WC	(United States) R Ginepri	2	7^{7}	2
6	(Russia) N Davydenko	6	6^{5}	6

Third round
3	(Switzerland) R Federer
(Germany) P Kohlschreiber	w/o
10	(Spain) D Ferrer	6	3	5
6	(Russia) N Davydenko	4	6	7

Quarterfinals
3	(Switzerland) R Federer	6	7
6	(Russia) N Davydenko	4	5

=== Bottom half ===
==== Section 3 ====
First round
(France) G Simon	6^{4}	5
WC	(United States) M Fish	7^{7}	7
(Germany) M Berrer	6^{4}	6	7^{10}
(Spain) T Robredo	7^{7}	4	6^{8}
(France) R Gasquet	2	6	6
12	(Russia) M Youzhny	6	4	1
13	(Austria) J Melzer	6	6
Q	(Colombia) S Giraldo	1	4
(Latvia) E Gulbis	7^{7}	6
WC	(United States) D Young	6^{5}	4
Q	(Germany) F Mayer	2	6^{4}
(France) J Chardy	6	7^{7}

Second round
8	(Spain) F Verdasco	6^{1}	6^{4}
WC	(United States) M Fish	7^{7}	7^{7}
(Germany) M Berrer	4	2
(France) R Gasquet	6	6
13	(Austria) J Melzer	7^{10}	3	6^{5}
(Latvia) E Gulbis	6^{8}	6	7^{7}
(France) J Chardy	3	7^{7}	2
4	(United Kingdom) A Murray	6	6^{3}	6

Third round
WC	(United States) M Fish	7	6
(France) R Gasquet	5	2
(Latvia) E Gulbis	6	3	6^{4}
4	(United Kingdom) A Murray	4	6	7^{7}

Quarterfinals
WC	(United States) M Fish	6^{7}	6	7^{7}
4	(United Kingdom) A Murray	7^{9}	1	6^{5}

==== Section 4 ====
First round
(Australia) L Hewitt	6	4
(Chinese Taipei) Y-h Lu	4	0	r
(Argentina) J Mónaco	4	7^{7}	3
(Netherlands) T de Bakker	6	6^{5}	6
(Ukraine) S Stakhovsky	4	7^{7}	1
9	(United States) A Roddick	6	6^{5}	6
15	(Croatia) I Ljubičić	5	0
PR	(Argentina) D Nalbandian	7	6
(United States) J Isner	6	6
(Poland) Ł Kubot	2	3
(Czech Republic) R Štěpánek	5	1
(Serbia) V Troicki	7	6

Second round
5	(Sweden) R Söderling	4	6	7
(Australia) L Hewitt	6	3	5
(Netherlands) T de Bakker	6^{4}	4
9	(United States) A Roddick	7^{7}	6
PR	(Argentina) D Nalbandian	4
(United States) J Isner	5	r
(Serbia) V Troicki	3	5
2	(Serbia) N Djokovic	6	7

Third round
5	(Sweden) R Söderling	4	7^{9}	6^{5}
9	(United States) A Roddick	6	6^{7}	7^{7}
PR	(Argentina) D Nalbandian	1	6^{7}
2	(Serbia) N Djokovic	6	7^{9}

Quarterfinals
9	(United States) A Roddick	6	7
2	(Serbia) N Djokovic	4	5

== Qualifying ==
=== Seeds ===
1. (Kazakhstan) Andrey Golubev (first round, retired)
2. (Germany) Florian Mayer (qualified)
3. (Uzbekistan) Denis Istomin (qualified)
4. (Colombia) Santiago Giraldo (qualified)
5. (Finland) Jarkko Nieminen (qualifying competition)
6. (Colombia) Alejandro Falla (qualified)
7. (Switzerland) Marco Chiudinelli (first round)
8. (France) Florent Serra (qualifying competition)
9. (Ukraine) Illya Marchenko (first round)
10. (Germany) Benjamin Becker (qualified)
11. (France) Arnaud Clément (qualifying competition)
12. (Germany) Simon Greul (qualifying competition)
13. (United States) Taylor Dent (qualified)
14. (United States) Michael Russell (qualifying competition)

=== Qualifiers ===
1. (Germany) Benjamin Becker
2. (Germany) Florian Mayer
3. (Uzbekistan) Denis Istomin
4. (Colombia) Santiago Giraldo
5. (United States) Taylor Dent
6. (Colombia) Alejandro Falla
7. (India) Somdev Devvarman

=== Qualifying draw ===
==== First qualifier ====
First round
1	(Kazakhstan) Andrey Golubev	3	1^{r}
(Italy) Fabio Fognini	6	3
(Luxembourg) Gilles Müller	3	4
10	(Germany) Benjamin Becker	6	6

Qualifying competition
(Italy) Fabio Fognini	6^{1}	1
10	(Germany) Benjamin Becker	7^{7}	6

==== Second qualifier ====
First round
2	(Germany) Florian Mayer	6	6
(Germany) Andreas Beck	3	4
WC	(United States) Jesse Witten	6^{2}	3
14	(United States) Michael Russell	7^{7}	6

Qualifying competition
2	(Germany) Florian Mayer	5	6	6
14	(United States) Michael Russell	7	1	3

==== Third qualifier ====
First round
3	(Uzbekistan) Denis Istomin	6	6
WC	(United States) Bobby Reynolds	1	4
(United States) Rajeev Ram	4	3
12	(Germany) Simon Greul	6	6

Qualifying competition
3	(Uzbekistan) Denis Istomin	6	7^{11}
12	(Germany) Simon Greul	2	6^{9}

==== Fourth qualifier ====
First round
4	(Colombia) Santiago Giraldo	6	6
(Turkey) Marsel İlhan	0	3
WC	(United States) Devin Britton	6^{2}	4
8	(France) Florent Serra	7^{7}	6

Qualifying competition
4	(Colombia) Santiago Giraldo	5	6	6
8	(France) Florent Serra	7	2	4

==== Fifth qualifier ====
First round
5	(Finland) Jarkko Nieminen	4	6	6
(United States) Ryan Sweeting	6	1	1
(Japan) Go Soeda	1	4
13	(United States) Taylor Dent	6	6

Qualifying competition
5	(Finland) Jarkko Nieminen	7^{9}	2	4
13	(United States) Taylor Dent	6^{7}	6	6

==== Sixth qualifier ====
First round
6	(Colombia) Alejandro Falla	6	6
(Slovenia) Grega Žemlja	3	3
(Paraguay) Ramón Delgado	4	3
11	(France) Arnaud Clément	6	6

Qualifying competition
6	(Colombia) Alejandro Falla	6	7
11	(France) Arnaud Clément	4	5

==== Seventh qualifier ====
First round
7	(Switzerland) Marco Chiudinelli	3	6^{3}
(India) Somdev Devvarman	6	7^{7}
WC	(United States) Tim Smyczek	4	6	6
9	(Ukraine) Illya Marchenko	6	1	4

Qualifying competition
(India) Somdev Devvarman	6	6
WC	(United States) Tim Smyczek	3	2
