= 2010 Sony Ericsson Open – Men's doubles =

Men's doubles
- 2010 Sony Ericsson Open

Final
- Champions: (Czech Republic) Lukáš Dlouhý (India) Leander Paes
- Runners-up: (India) Mahesh Bhupathi (Belarus) Max Mirnyi
- Score: 6–2, 7–5

Events
Singles	men	women
Doubles	men	women
- Sony Ericsson Open

Max Mirnyi and Andy Ram were the defending champions. Both were present, but chose not to compete together this year. Ram partnered with Michaël Llodra, but they lost to Feliciano López and Fernando Verdasco in the first round.

Mirnyi partnered with Mahesh Bhupathi, reaching the final, where they were defeated by Lukáš Dlouhý and Leander Paes (6–2, 7–5).

== Seeds ==
1. (Canada) Daniel Nestor / (Serbia) Nenad Zimonjić (second round)
2. (United States) Bob Bryan / (United States) Mike Bryan (quarterfinals)
3. (Czech Republic) Lukáš Dlouhý / (India) Leander Paes (champions)
4. (India) Mahesh Bhupathi / (Belarus) Max Mirnyi (final)
5. (Poland) Łukasz Kubot / (Austria) Oliver Marach (first round)
6. (Sweden) Simon Aspelin / (Australia) Paul Hanley (second round)
7. (Czech Republic) František Čermák / (Slovakia) Michal Mertiňák (second round)
8. (Poland) Mariusz Fyrstenberg / (Poland) Marcin Matkowski (semifinals)

== Draw ==
Key

- Q = Qualifier
- WC = Wild card
- LL = Lucky loser
- Alt = Alternate
- ITF = ITF entry
- PR = Protected ranking
- SR = Special ranking
- SE = Special exempt
- JE = Junior exempt
- JR = Junior Accelerator Programme entrant
- CO = College Accelerator Programme entrant
- NG = Next Gen Accelerator Program entrant
- w/o = Walkover
- r = Retired
- d = Defaulted

=== Finals ===
Semifinals
(Spain) Nicolás Almagro (Spain) Tommy Robredo	3	0
3	(Czech Republic) Lukáš Dlouhý (India) Leander Paes	6	6
4	(India) Mahesh Bhupathi (Belarus) Max Mirnyi	7^{7}	6
8	(Poland) Mariusz Fyrstenberg (Poland) Marcin Matkowski	6^{4}	4

Final
3	(Czech Republic) Lukáš Dlouhý (India) Leander Paes	6	7
4	(India) Mahesh Bhupathi (Belarus) Max Mirnyi	2	5

=== Top half ===
First round
1	(Canada) D Nestor (Serbia) N Zimonjić	6	6
ALT	(Uzbekistan) D Istomin (Germany) F Moser	0	2
(Spain) N Almagro (Spain) T Robredo	6	4	[14]
(Brazil) M Melo (Brazil) B Soares	2	6	[12]
(France) M Llodra (Israel) A Ram	2	5
(Spain) F López (Spain) F Verdasco	6	7
(Austria) J Melzer (Germany) P Petzschner	3	7^{7}	[12]
6	(Sweden) S Aspelin (Australia) P Hanley	6	6^{4}	[14]
3	(Czech Republic) L Dlouhý (India) L Paes	6	7^{7}
(United Kingdom) R Hutchins (Australia) J Kerr	4	6^{4}
(Brazil) T Bellucci (Spain) M López	3	6	[10]
(Germany) C Kas (Belgium) D Norman	6	3	[8]
(Czech Republic) M Damm (Slovakia) F Polášek	6	7^{7}
(Croatia) I Karlović (Serbia) D Vemić	2	6^{5}
(Germany) B Becker (Germany) M Kohlmann	6	7^{8}
5	(Poland) Ł Kubot (Austria) O Marach	1	6^{6}

Second round
1	(Canada) D Nestor (Serbia) N Zimonjić	6	2	[5]
(Spain) N Almagro (Spain) T Robredo	4	6	[10]
(Spain) F López (Spain) F Verdasco	6	7^{7}
6	(Sweden) S Aspelin (Australia) P Hanley	1	6^{3}
3	(Czech Republic) L Dlouhý (India) L Paes	4	6	[10]
(Brazil) T Bellucci (Spain) M López	6	3	[8]
(Czech Republic) M Damm (Slovakia) F Polášek	6^{3}	6^{5}
(Germany) B Becker (Germany) M Kohlmann	7^{7}	7^{7}

Quarterfinals
(Spain) N Almagro (Spain) T Robredo	7	6
(Spain) F López (Spain) F Verdasco	5	3
3	(Czech Republic) L Dlouhý (India) L Paes	6	6
(Germany) B Becker (Germany) M Kohlmann	4	4

Semifinals
(Spain) N Almagro (Spain) T Robredo	3	0
3	(Czech Republic) L Dlouhý (India) L Paes	6	6

=== Bottom half ===
First round
7	(Czech Republic) F Čermák (Slovakia) M Mertiňák	7^{7}	6
(Sweden) R Lindstedt (Romania) H Tecău	6^{1}	4
(France) A Clément (France) J-W Tsonga	2	6	[10]
(Spain) G García-López (Spain) A Montañés	6	3	[5]
(United States) J Isner (United States) S Querrey	4	6	[10]
(Sweden) J Brunström (Netherlands Antilles) J-J Rojer	6	3	[7]
(Australia) S Huss (South Africa) W Moodie	4	5
4	(India) M Bhupathi (Belarus) M Mirnyi	6	7
8	(Poland) M Fyrstenberg (Poland) M Matkowski	6^{4}	7	[14]
(Austria) J Knowle (Germany) P Kohlschreiber	7^{7}	5	[12]
(Russia) I Andreev (Russia) M Youzhny	7	6
(United States) M Fish (The Bahamas) M Knowles	5	4
WC	(United States) R Harrison (Ecuador) N Lapentti	1	5
(United States) E Butorac (United States) R Ram	6	7
WC	(Spain) R Nadal (Spain) B Salvá-Vidal	0	3
2	(United States) B Bryan (United States) M Bryan	6	6

Second round
7	(Czech Republic) F Čermák (Slovakia) M Mertiňák	3	0
(France) A Clément (France) J-W Tsonga	6	6
(United States) J Isner (United States) S Querrey	3	2
4	(India) M Bhupathi (Belarus) M Mirnyi	6	6
8	(Poland) M Fyrstenberg (Poland) M Matkowski	4	6	[10]
(Russia) I Andreev (Russia) M Youzhny	6	4	[6]
(United States) E Butorac (United States) R Ram	4	4
2	(United States) B Bryan (United States) M Bryan	6	6

Quarterfinals
(France) A Clément (France) J-W Tsonga	4	7^{7}	[4]
4	(India) M Bhupathi (Belarus) M Mirnyi	6	6^{5}	[10]
8	(Poland) M Fyrstenberg (Poland) M Matkowski	6	6
2	(United States) B Bryan (United States) M Bryan	2	2

Semifinals
4	(India) M Bhupathi (Belarus) M Mirnyi	7^{7}	6
8	(Poland) M Fyrstenberg (Poland) M Matkowski	6^{4}	4
