= 2019 Rolex Shanghai Masters =

- Date: October 6–13
- Edition: 11th
- Category: ATP Tour Masters 1000
- Surface: Hard / Outdoor
- Location: Shanghai, China
- Venue: Qizhong Forest Sports City Arena

Champions

Singles
- (Russia) Daniil Medvedev

Doubles
- (Croatia) Mate Pavić / (Brazil) Bruno Soares
← 2018 ·	Shanghai Masters	· 2023 →

The 2019 Shanghai Rolex Masters was a tennis tournament played on outdoor hard courts. It was the 11th edition of the Shanghai ATP Masters 1000, classified as an ATP Tour Masters 1000 event on the 2019 ATP Tour. It took place at Qizhong Forest Sports City Arena in Shanghai, China from October 6 to 13, 2019.

== Singles main-draw entrants ==
=== Seeds ===
The following were the seeded players. Seedings were based on ATP rankings as of September 30, 2019. Rankings and points before are as of October 7, 2019.

Seed	Rank	Player	Points before	Points defending	Points won	Points after	Status
1	1	(Serbia) Novak Djokovic	10,365	1,000	180	9,545	Quarterfinals lost to (Greece) Stefanos Tsitsipas [6]
2	3	(Switzerland) Roger Federer	7,130	360	180	6,950	Quarterfinals lost to (Germany) Alexander Zverev [5]
3	4	(Russia) Daniil Medvedev	4,965	45	1,000	5,920	Champion, defeated (Germany) Alexander Zverev [5]
4	5	(Austria) Dominic Thiem	4,915	10	180	5,085	Quarterfinals lost to (Italy) Matteo Berrettini [11]
5	6	(Germany) Alexander Zverev	4,185	360	600	4,425	Runner-up, lost to (Russia) Daniil Medvedev [3]
6	7	(Greece) Stefanos Tsitsipas	3,630	90	360	3,900	Semifinals lost to (Russia) Daniil Medvedev [3]
7	9	(Russia) Karen Khachanov	2,945	45	90	2,990	Third round lost to (Italy) Fabio Fognini [10]
8	10	(Spain) Roberto Bautista Agut	2,575	90	90	2,575	Third round lost to (Italy) Matteo Berrettini [11]
9	11	(France) Gaël Monfils	2,375	10	45	2,410	Second round lost to (Poland) Hubert Hurkacz
10	12	(Italy) Fabio Fognini	2,280	(45)^{†}	180	2,415	Quarterfinals lost to (Russia) Daniil Medvedev [3]
11	13	(Italy) Matteo Berrettini	2,221	16	360	2,565	Semifinals lost to (Germany) Alexander Zverev [5]
12	15	(Croatia) Borna Ćorić	2,130	600	10	1,540	First round lost to (Russia) Andrey Rublev
13	14	(Belgium) David Goffin	2,190	0	90	2,280	Third round lost to (Switzerland) Roger Federer [2]
14	16	(Argentina) Diego Schwartzman	1,995	10	10	1,995	First round lost to (Canada) Vasek Pospisil [Q]
15	26	(Georgia (country)) Nikoloz Basilashvili	1,440	45	90	1,485	Third round lost to (Austria) Dominic Thiem [4]
16	17	(United States) John Isner	1,895	0	90	1,985	Third round lost to (Serbia) Novak Djokovic [1]

† The player used an exemption to skip the tournament in 2018. Accordingly, points for his 18th best result are deducted instead.

The following players would have been seeded, but they withdrew from the event.

Rank	Player	Points before	Points defending	Points after	Reason
2	(Spain) Rafael Nadal	9,225	0	9,225	Left wrist injury
8	(Japan) Kei Nishikori	3,040	180	2,860	Right elbow injury
18	(South Africa) Kevin Anderson	1,780	180	1,600	Right knee injury

=== Other entrants ===
The following players received wildcards into the singles main draw:

- (China) Li Zhe
- (United Kingdom) Andy Murray
- (China) Zhang Ze
- (China) Zhang Zhizhen

The following player received entry as a special exempt:

- (Australia) John Millman

The following players received entry from the qualifying draw:

- (Kazakhstan) Alexander Bublik
- (Spain) Pablo Carreño Busta
- (Italy) Marco Cecchinato
- (France) Jérémy Chardy
- (Argentina) Juan Ignacio Londero
- (United Kingdom) Cameron Norrie
- (Canada) Vasek Pospisil

=== Withdrawals ===
Before the tournament

- (South Africa) Kevin Anderson → replaced by (United States) Frances Tiafoe
- (Argentina) Juan Martín del Potro → replaced by (Italy) Lorenzo Sonego
- (Serbia) Laslo Đere → replaced by (Serbia) Filip Krajinović
- (Australia) Nick Kyrgios → replaced by (Spain) Albert Ramos Viñolas
- (Spain) Rafael Nadal → replaced by (Uruguay) Pablo Cuevas
- (Japan) Kei Nishikori → replaced by (United States) Sam Querrey
- (Canada) Milos Raonic → replaced by (Kazakhstan) Mikhail Kukushkin
- (Switzerland) Stan Wawrinka → replaced by (Serbia) Miomir Kecmanović

=== Retirements ===
- (Kazakhstan) Mikhail Kukushkin

== Doubles main-draw entrants ==
=== Seeds ===
Country	Player	Country	Player	Rank^{1}	Seed
COL	Juan Sebastián Cabal	COL	Robert Farah	2	1
POL	Łukasz Kubot	BRA	Marcelo Melo	9	2
ESP	Marcel Granollers	ARG	Horacio Zeballos	12	3
RSA	Raven Klaasen	NZL	Michael Venus	18	4
GER	Kevin Krawietz	GER	Andreas Mies	26	5
FRA	Nicolas Mahut	FRA	Édouard Roger-Vasselin	35	6
NED	Jean-Julien Rojer	ROU	Horia Tecău	39	7
CRO	Mate Pavić	BRA	Bruno Soares	39	8

- Rankings are as of September 30, 2019

=== Other entrants ===
The following pairs received wildcards into the doubles main draw:

- (Croatia) Borna Ćorić / (China) Hua Runhao
- (China) Gao Xin / (China) Li Zhe
- (China) Gong Maoxin / (China) Zhang Ze

== Champions ==
=== Singles ===
- (Russia) Daniil Medvedev def. (Germany) Alexander Zverev, 6–4, 6–1

=== Doubles ===
- (Croatia) Mate Pavić / (Brazil) Bruno Soares def. (Poland) Łukasz Kubot / (Brazil) Marcelo Melo, 6–4, 6–2
