= 2009 Shanghai ATP Masters 1000 =

- Date: October 11–18
- Edition: 1st
- Category: ATP World Tour Masters 1000
- Surface: Hard / outdoor
- Location: Shanghai, China
- Venue: Qizhong Forest Sports City Arena

Champions

Singles
- (Russia) Nikolay Davydenko

Doubles
- (France) Julien Benneteau / (France) Jo-Wilfried Tsonga
Shanghai Masters	· 2010 →

The 2009 Shanghai ATP Masters 1000 (also known as the 2009 Shanghai ATP Masters 1000–presented by Rolex) was a tennis tournament played on outdoor hard courts. It was the 1st edition of the Shanghai ATP Masters 1000, and was classified as an ATP World Tour Masters 1000 event on the 2009 ATP World Tour. It was played at Qizhong Forest Sports City Arena in Shanghai, China. The tournament replaced Madrid as the second and last ATP World Tour Masters 1000 tournament where it was now moved into a spring calendar, the inaugural edition was held from October 11 to October 18, 2009.

The singles field was led by Rafael Nadal. Other top seeds were 2008 Australian Open champion Novak Djokovic, reigning US Open champion Juan Martín del Potro and Wimbledon finalist Andy Roddick.

World No. 1 Roger Federer had been due to play but withdrew, citing fatigue. World No. 3 Andy Murray was also scheduled to play, but withdrew due to a wrist injury.

== ATP entrants ==
=== Seeds ===
Country	Player	Rank^{1}	Seed
ESP	Rafael Nadal	2	1
SRB	Novak Djokovic	4	2
ARG	Juan Martín del Potro	5	3
USA	Andy Roddick	6	4
FRA	Jo-Wilfried Tsonga	7	5
RUS	Nikolay Davydenko	8	6
ESP	Fernando Verdasco	9	7
FRA	Gilles Simon	10	8
SWE	Robin Söderling	11	9
CHI	Fernando González	12	10
FRA	Gaël Monfils	13	11
CRO	Marin Čilić	15	12
CZE	Radek Štěpánek	16	13
ESP	Tommy Robredo	17	14
GER	Tommy Haas	18	15
ESP	David Ferrer	19	16

- seeds are based on the rankings of October 5, 2009

=== Other entrants ===
The following players received wildcards into the singles main draw:

- (China) Gong Maoxin
- (Latvia) Ernests Gulbis
- (Russia) Marat Safin
- (China) Zeng Shao-Xuan

The following players received entry from the qualifying draw:

- (Brazil) Thomaz Bellucci
- (Switzerland) Marco Chiudinelli
- (Italy) Fabio Fognini
- (Poland) Łukasz Kubot
- (France) Michaël Llodra
- (Germany) Florian Mayer
- (Germany) Rainer Schüttler

== Finals ==
=== Singles ===
(Russia) Nikolay Davydenko defeated (Spain) Rafael Nadal, 7–6^{(7–3)}, 6–3

- It was Davydenko's 4th title of the year and the 18th of his career.
- It was Davydenko's 3rd Masters title and improving his perfect Masters finals to 3–0.

=== Doubles ===
(France) Julien Benneteau / (France) Jo-Wilfried Tsonga defeated (Poland) Mariusz Fyrstenberg / (Poland) Marcin Matkowski, 6–2, 6–4.
