= 2018 Shanghai Rolex Masters =

- Date: October 7–14
- Edition: 10th
- Category: ATP World Tour Masters 1000
- Surface: Hard / Outdoor
- Location: Shanghai, China
- Venue: Qizhong Forest Sports City Arena

Champions

Singles
- (Serbia) Novak Djokovic

Doubles
- (Poland) Łukasz Kubot / (Brazil) Marcelo Melo
← 2017 ·	Shanghai Masters	· 2019 →

The 2018 Shanghai Rolex Masters was a tennis tournament played on outdoor hard courts. It was the tenth edition of the Shanghai ATP Masters 1000, classified as an ATP World Tour Masters 1000 event on the 2018 ATP World Tour. It took place at Qizhong Forest Sports City Arena in Shanghai, China from October 7 to 14, 2018.

== Points and prize money ==
=== Point distribution ===
Event	W	F	SF	QF	Round of 16	Round of 32	Round of 64	Q	Q2	Q1
Singles	1,000	600	360	180	90	45	10	25	16	0
Doubles	1,000	600	360	180	90	0	—	—	—	—

=== Prize money ===
Event	W	F	SF	QF	Round of 16	Round of 32	Round of 64	Q2	Q1
Singles	$1,360,560	$667,115	$335,750	$170,725	$88,655	$46,745	$25,235	$5,815	$2,965
Doubles	$421,340	$206,280	$103,470	$53,110	$27,450	$14,480	—	—	—

== Singles main-draw entrants ==
=== Seeds ===
The following are the seeded players. Seedings are based on ATP rankings as of October 1, 2018. Rankings and points before are as of October 8, 2018.

Seed	Rank	Player	Points before	Points defending	Points won	Points after	Status
1	2	(Switzerland) Roger Federer	6,900	1,000	360	6,260	Semifinals lost to (Croatia) Borna Ćorić [13]
2	3	(Serbia) Novak Djokovic	6,445	0	1000	7,445	Champion, won against (Croatia) Borna Ćorić [13]
3	4	(Argentina) Juan Martín del Potro	6,130	360	90	5,860	Third round retired against (Croatia) Borna Ćorić [13]
4	5	(Germany) Alexander Zverev	4,755	90	360	5,025	Semifinals lost to (Serbia) Novak Djokovic [2]
5	6	(Croatia) Marin Čilić	4,535	360	10	4,185	Second round lost to (Chile) Nicolás Jarry
6	7	(Austria) Dominic Thiem	3,825	10	10	3,825	Second round lost to (Australia) Matthew Ebden
7	8	(South Africa) Kevin Anderson	3,640	45	180	3,775	Quarterfinals lost to (Serbia) Novak Djokovic [2]
8	12	(Japan) Kei Nishikori	2,730	0	180	2,910	Quarterfinals lost to (Switzerland) Roger Federer [1]
9	16	(Argentina) Diego Schwartzman	1,975	45	10	1,940	First round lost to (United States) Sam Querrey
10	15	(Greece) Stefanos Tsitsipas	1,987	70	90	2,007	Third round lost to (South Africa) Kevin Anderson [7]
11	14	(United Kingdom) Kyle Edmund	1,990	45	180	2,125	Quarterfinals lost to (Germany) Alexander Zverev [4]
12	17	(United States) Jack Sock	1,850	10	10	1,850	First round lost to (Germany) Peter Gojowczyk
13	19	(Croatia) Borna Ćorić	1,815	0	600	2,415	Runner-up, lost to (Serbia) Novak Djokovic [2]
14	20	(Canada) Milos Raonic	1,800	0	10	1,810	First round lost to (United States) Mackenzie McDonald [Q]
15	24	(Spain) Pablo Carreño Busta	1,750	10	10	1,750	First round lost to (France) Benoît Paire [Q]
16	21	(Italy) Marco Cecchinato	1,768	(20)^{†}	90	1,838	Third round lost to (Serbia) Novak Djokovic [2]

† The player did not qualify for the tournament in 2017. Accordingly, points for his 18th best result are deducted instead.

=== Withdrawals ===
The following players would have been seeded, but they withdrew from the event.

Rank	Player	Points before	Points defending	Points after	Reason
1	(Spain) Rafael Nadal	8,260	600	7,660	Knee injury
9	(Bulgaria) Grigor Dimitrov	3,620	180	3,440	Ankle injury
10	(United States) John Isner	3,380	90	3,290	Personal
11	(Belgium) David Goffin	2,865	10	2,855	Right shoulder injury
13	(Italy) Fabio Fognini	2,315	90	2,315^{†}	Ankle injury
18	(France) Lucas Pouille	1,825	45	1,780	Muscle sprain

† Fognini is entitled to use an exemption to skip the tournament and substitute his 18th best result (90 points) in its stead. Accordingly, his points after the tournament will remain unchanged.

=== Other entrants ===
The following players received wildcards into the singles main draw:

- (China) Li Zhe
- (Switzerland) Stan Wawrinka
- (China) Wu Yibing
- (China) Zhang Ze

The following players received entry from the qualifying draw:

- (United States) Taylor Fritz
- (Poland) Hubert Hurkacz
- (United States) Bradley Klahn
- (Kazakhstan) Mikhail Kukushkin
- (United States) Mackenzie McDonald
- (France) Benoît Paire
- (Canada) Vasek Pospisil

=== Withdrawals ===
Before the tournament

- (Bulgaria) Grigor Dimitrov → replaced by (Italy) Andreas Seppi
- (Italy) Fabio Fognini → replaced by (Australia) Matthew Ebden
- (Belgium) David Goffin → replaced by (France) Jérémy Chardy
- (United States) John Isner → replaced by (Netherlands) Robin Haase
- (Germany) Philipp Kohlschreiber → replaced by (Germany) Mischa Zverev
- (Spain) Rafael Nadal → replaced by (Australia) Alex de Minaur
- (France) Lucas Pouille → replaced by (Germany) Peter Gojowczyk
- (Spain) Fernando Verdasco → replaced by (Germany) Maximilian Marterer

=== Retirements ===
- (Argentina) Juan Martín del Potro

== Doubles main-draw entrants ==
=== Seeds ===
Country	Player	Country	Player	Rank^{1}	Seed
USA	Mike Bryan	USA	Jack Sock	3	1
AUT	Oliver Marach	CRO	Mate Pavić	7	2
POL	Łukasz Kubot	BRA	Marcelo Melo	10	3
FIN	Henri Kontinen	AUS	John Peers	15	4
COL	Juan Sebastián Cabal	COL	Robert Farah	19	5
GBR	Jamie Murray	BRA	Bruno Soares	23	6
RSA	Raven Klaasen	NZL	Michael Venus	33	7
CRO	Ivan Dodig	CRO	Nikola Mektić	39	8

- Rankings are as of October 1, 2018

=== Other entrants ===
The following pairs received wildcards into the doubles main draw:

- (China) Gong Maoxin / (China) Zhang Ze
- (China) Li Zhe / (China) Di Wu

=== Withdrawals ===
Before the tournament

- (Georgia (country)) Nikoloz Basilashvili

== Champions ==
=== Singles ===
- (Serbia) Novak Djokovic def. (Croatia) Borna Ćorić, 6–3, 6–4

=== Doubles ===
- (Poland) Łukasz Kubot / (Brazil) Marcelo Melo def. (United Kingdom) Jamie Murray / (Brazil) Bruno Soares, 6–2, 6–4
