= Tennis in China =

Tennis is a rapidly growing sport that has received much private and public support in China, and has today become firmly entrenched in the Chinese as one of the most popular. Tennis is now the third-most popular sport on television in China, behind Association football and basketball. The national governing body is the China Tennis Association.

China has 30,000 tennis courts and an estimated 14 million people in China regularly play tennis, up from 1 million when the sport returned to the Olympics in 1988, according to the WTA Tour. The Chinese government is aiming to increase that by 15 percent every year. The nation's tennis market has reached $4 billion annually, according to Tom Cannon, a professor and sports finance expert at the University of Liverpool Management School in England.

The women's tour in 2014 upgraded the China Open in Beijing to become the only combined event with the men's tour in Asia. Played at the Beijing Olympic Tennis Center with combined prize money of $6.6 million and a main stadium that holds 10,000 spectators, the China Open is now one of the WTA's top four tournaments. The ATP's other flagship tournament in Asia is the $3.24 million Shanghai Masters.

== Overview and history ==
Overall there are four fundamental reasons that have contributed to the growth of tennis in China. Firstly, the national economy has improved enormously and the booming middle class sees tennis as a family sport and a way to improve social status. Secondly, there has been the emergence of higher ranked players from other parts of Asia, such as Japan, India, Thailand and Indonesia all of whom spur competition and standard of play. Thirdly, the investment of the International Tennis Federation and the Chinese Tennis Association in the development of the grass-roots game has been crucial. And finally there are the Beijing Olympics, considered as a way to raise the profile of sports in China.

When tennis became a fully-fledged Olympic sport, the government began to invest money in the sport. This became a trend in many parts of the world, such as Russia, Serbia and Croatia. Funds were also secured to send teams of players overseas. The women's national team soon reached the elite World Group in the Fed Cup. With funding issues taken care of, the players and their coaches were able to concentrate totally on training and preparation. New programs were introduced for speed and stamina training and for developing technical expertise.

While Chinese women players dominate the scene today, it was the men who made the initial breakthrough. In 2003, at the Heineken Open in Shanghai, wildcards Zeng Shaoxuan and Zhu Benqiang made an important advance. They became the first players from China to reach a tour-level doubles final.

Li Ting and Sun Tiantian won the doubles gold medal at the 2004 Athens Olympics.

In 2006, more tennis history was written when Zheng Jie and Yan Zi won doubles at the Australian Open and Wimbledon. Li Na at the same Wimbledon year, became the first Chinese player to reach a Grand Slam singles quarter-final and also the first player from China to be ranked in the world's top 20. Li Na and Zheng Jie were also the first players to compete in an all-Chinese final - in Estoril (Portugal) in 2006. At Wimbledon in 2008, Zheng Jie became first Chinese player ever to reach semifinals of a Grand Slam singles tournament, and in 2009, became the first Chinese player to be ranked in the world's top 15, as world number 15.

During the 2010 Australian Open, Li Na and compatriot Zheng Jie made history for becoming the first two Chinese players to reach the top four of a Grand Slam tournament simultaneously. The media dubbed the players as the two "Golden Flowers," and many heralded their feat as a breakthrough for Chinese tennis. In 2011, Li Na became the first player to reach the final of the Australian Open but was unable to take the title. Months later, Li reached her second consecutive Grand Slam final at the French Open and won her first Grand Slam singles title, thus becoming the first player from Asia to win a Slam. Her feat has sparked a major population growth of tennis players in China. Others have suggested it signals the emergence of China as a tennis power.

After Li's retirement in 2014, popularity of tennis in China mostly surged in 2024 after a strong showing by the contingent at that year's Summer Olympics. In the women's singles discipline, Zheng Qinwen became the first Chinese and Asian player to win a gold medal at the event after defeating Donna Vekić, whilst Wang Xinyu and Zhang Zhizhen won a silver medal in the mixed doubles discipline after losing the final to Kateřina Siniaková and Tomáš Macháč. With Zheng's success described as a "watershed moment for tennis and China" by The New York Times, it was reported by South China Morning Post that the official sporting body of China is planning to implement a tennis ecosystem in order to "vigorously develop tennis".

== Academies ==
The Michael Chang Mission Hills Tennis Academy (which has 50 courts) opened in 2008 in Shenzhen, where Michael Chang aims to nurture young Chinese players in a bid to bring the level of Chinese tennis up to the international standard. He intends to contribute his experience accumulated from playing in world tournaments to the development of tennis in China. Chang is very popular in China, where he is better known by his Mandarin name Zhang Depei. Chang, who retired in 2002, has worked as a coach with Peng Shuai in 2007.

== Events and tournaments ==
Tournament	Venue	Surface	Category
2008 Summer Olympics	National Tennis Center, Beijing	Hard	Olympic Games
Chengdu Open	Sichuan International Tennis Center	Hard	ATP World Tour 250 Series
China Open	Beijing Tennis Center (2004–2008) National Tennis Center (2009–current)	Hard	ATP World Tour 500 series WTA Premier Mandatory
Guangzhou International Women's Open	Guangzhou International Tennis Center	Hard	WTA International
Heineken Open Shanghai	Xianxia Tennis Center (1998–2001, 2003–2004)	Hard	ATP International Series
Hong Kong Open	Victoria Park	Hard	WTA International
Jiangxi International Women's Tennis Open	Nanchang International Tennis Center	Hard	WTA International
Shanghai Rolex Masters	Qizhong Forest Sports City Arena	Hard	ATP World Tour Masters 1000
ATP Shenzhen Open WTA Shenzhen Open	Shenzhen Longgang Tennis Center	Hard	ATP World Tour 250 series (2014–2018); WTA International
Tennis Masters Cup	Shanghai New International Expo Center (2002); Qizhong Forest Sports City Arena (2005–2008)	Carpet/Hard	ATP World Tour Finals
Tianjin Open	Tianjin International Tennis Center	Hard	WTA International
Wuhan Open	Optics Valley International Tennis Center	Hard	WTA Premier 5
WTA Elite Trophy	Zhuhai Hengqin International Tennis Centre	Hard	WTA Tour Championships
Zhuhai Open	Zhuhai Hengqin International Tennis Centre	Hard	ATP World Tour 250 series

- JB Group Classic
- China Tennis Grand Prix

== Statistics by player ==
Players shown in bold are active.

=== Women ===
Player	WTA Singles Titles	Grand Slam Singles Titles	WTA Doubles Titles	Grand Slam Doubles Titles	Summer Olympics Singles Gold Medal	Summer Olympics Doubles Gold Medal	WTA 125K Singles Titles	WTA 125K Doubles Titles	ITF Singles Titles	ITF Doubles Titles	Total Titles	Highest Singles Ranking	Highest Doubles Ranking
**Duan Yingying**	1	0	3	0	0	0	0	2	11	3	20	60	16
Li Na	9	**2**	2	0	0	0	0	0	19	16	46	2	54
Li Ting	0	0	9	0	0	**1**	0	0	3	26	39	136	19
Peng Shuai	2	0	23	**2**	0	0	2	1	12	3	43	14	**1**
Sun Tiantian	1	0	12	**1 (Mixed)**	0	**1**	0	0	6	13	33	77	16
**Wang Qiang**	2	0	0	0	0	0	1	0	14	1	18	12	118
**Wang Yafan**	1	0	3	0	0	0	1	4	16	7	32	47	49
Yan Zi	1	0	17	**2**	0	0	0	0	0	16	34	40	4
**Zhang Shuai**	3	0	14	**2**	0	0	2	2	21	8	50	22	2
Zheng Jie	4	0	15	**2**	0	0	0	0	4	17	40	15	3
**Zheng Saisai**	1	0	6	0	0	**1 (Youth)**	3	3	12	9	30	34	15

=== Men ===
Player	ATP Singles Titles	Grand Slam Singles Titles	ATP Doubles Titles	Grand Slam Doubles Titles	ATP Challenger Singles Titles	ATP Challenger Doubles Titles	ITF Singles Titles	ITF Doubles Titles	Total Titles	Highest Singles Ranking	Highest Doubles Ranking
**Wu Yibing**	1	0	0	0	4	0	2	0	7	54	295
**Zhang Zhizhen**	0	0	1	0	3	2	2	2	10	31	49
**Shang Juncheng**	1	0	0	0	1	0	4	0	5	89	NR
**Bu Yunchaokete**	0	0	0	0	3	0	6	0	9	147	274

== Venues ==
- Beijing Tennis Center
- National Tennis Center
- Qizhong Forest Sports City Arena

Since its return in 2005, the Tennis Masters Cup in Shanghai has been held at the spectacular Qi Zhong Stadium, a facility that many believe features the best tennis court in the world. In China, feng shui plays an important cultural role. Placement and arrangement of space to achieve harmony with the environment was crucial. All this was taken into consideration in the design of Qi Zhong, built on unused land about 32 kilometers from the center of Shanghai. In less than 18 months the 15,000-seat stadium was constructed with a retractable roof unlike any other in the world. Named after the flower of Shanghai, the "magnolia roof" twists as it opens and closes. It comprises eight panels or "petals" - eight is considered a very lucky number in China.

== WTA ==
The WTA is to set up its regional office in Beijing in 2008 and the city has been awarded one of the WTA's premier events. In 2009, the China Open will be combined event for women and men. It is one of the four mandatory events for the WTA and it will be played at the new Olympic Green Tennis Centre, built for tennis matches at the 2008 Olympic Games.

On 1 December 2021, WTA suspended all tournaments in China amid concerns about the safety of the Chinese tennis star Peng Shuai. The safety of Peng Shuai became a matter of international concern after she made sexual assault allegations against Zhang Gaoli, a former China vice-premier.

== Notable players ==
See: Chinese tennis players

Chinese women have won Olympic and Grand Slam doubles titles over the last six years, while Li Na and Zheng Jie have made the most significant breakthroughs in singles by reaching semifinals at the Australian Open and Wimbledon. Li was the first Chinese player to break into the top 10 of the women's game and win a singles grand slam in 2011 at the French Open. China's Li Ting and Sun Tian Tian won the women's doubles gold medal at the 2004 Athens Olympics. In 2006, Zheng and Yan Zi became the country's first Grand Slam champions, taking the women's doubles titles at the Australian Open and Wimbledon. At the, Zheng and Yan got a bronze medal in the women's doubles. China now has three women inside the top 50.

On the men's side, Zhang Zhizhen became the first Chinese player to reach the ATP's top 100. Wu Yibing became the first Chinese male player to win a men's singles match in a major at the 2022 US Open and the first Chinese male player in the Open Era to reach the third round of a major. He made his debut in the top 100 in February 2023, and became the first Chinese player in history to win an ATP title. 17 year old Shang Juncheng also has a position inside the top 200. Shang finished runner-up at the 2021 Junior US Open.

== See also ==
- Sport in the People's Republic of China
- Chinese Tennis Association
- China Davis Cup team
- China Fed Cup team
- Tennis tournaments in China
