= 2019 Rolex Shanghai Masters – Doubles =

Doubles
- 2019 Rolex Shanghai Masters

Final
- Champions: (Croatia) Mate Pavić (Brazil) Bruno Soares
- Runners-up: (Poland) Łukasz Kubot (Brazil) Marcelo Melo
- Score: 6–4, 6–2

Details
- Draw: 32 (2 WC )
- Seeds: 8

Events
Singles	Doubles
← 2018 ·	Shanghai Masters	· 2023 →

Łukasz Kubot and Marcelo Melo were the defending champions, but lost to Mate Pavić and Bruno Soares in the final, 4–6, 2–6.

== Seeds ==
1. (Colombia) Juan Sebastián Cabal / (Colombia) Robert Farah (quarterfinals)
2. (Poland) Łukasz Kubot / (Brazil) Marcelo Melo (final)
3. (Spain) Marcel Granollers / (Argentina) Horacio Zeballos (second round)
4. (South Africa) Raven Klaasen / (New Zealand) Michael Venus (quarterfinals)
5. (Germany) Kevin Krawietz / (Germany) Andreas Mies (first round)
6. (France) Nicolas Mahut / (France) Édouard Roger-Vasselin (semifinals)
7. (Netherlands) Jean-Julien Rojer / (Romania) Horia Tecău (second round)
8. (Croatia) Mate Pavić / (Brazil) Bruno Soares (champions)

== Draw ==
=== Key ===
- Q = Qualifier
- WC = Wild card
- LL = Lucky loser
- Alt = Alternate
- SE = Special exempt
- PR = Protected ranking
- ITF = ITF entry
- JE = Junior exempt
- w/o = Walkover
- r = Retired
- d = Defaulted
- SR = Special ranking

=== Finals ===
Semifinals
8	(Croatia) Mate Pavić (Brazil) Bruno Soares	7	6
(United Kingdom) Jamie Murray (United Kingdom) Neal Skupski	5	4
6	(France) Nicolas Mahut (France) Édouard Roger-Vasselin	2	4
2	(Poland) Łukasz Kubot (Brazil) Marcelo Melo	6	6

Final
8	(Croatia) Mate Pavić (Brazil) Bruno Soares	6	6
2	(Poland) Łukasz Kubot (Brazil) Marcelo Melo	4	2

=== Top half ===
First round
1	(Colombia) JS Cabal (Colombia) R Farah	6	6
(Austria) O Marach (Austria) J Melzer	3	3
(Australia) A de Minaur (Spain) A Ramos Viñolas	6^{4}	6^{4}
(United States) J Isner (United States) S Querrey	7^{7}	7^{7}
(France) J Chardy (France) F Martin	4	6^{4}
(Poland) H Hurkacz (France) B Paire	6	7^{7}
(France) A Mannarino (France) G Monfils	3	3
8	(Croatia) M Pavić (Brazil) B Soares	6	6
4	(South Africa) R Klaasen (New Zealand) M Venus	6	7^{10}
(Netherlands) W Koolhof (Greece) S Tsitsipas	4	6^{8}
(Uruguay) P Cuevas (Argentina) G Pella	6^{2}	6^{7}
(Finland) H Kontinen (Australia) J Peers	7^{7}	7^{9}
WC	(China) X Gao (China) Z Li	3	4
(United Kingdom) J Murray (United Kingdom) N Skupski	6	6
(Serbia) N Djokovic (Serbia) F Krajinović	6	3	[10]
5	(Germany) K Krawietz (Germany) A Mies	3	6	[3]

Second round
1	(Colombia) JS Cabal (Colombia) R Farah	6	6
(United States) J Isner (United States) S Querrey	0	4
(Poland) H Hurkacz (France) B Paire	1	5
8	(Croatia) M Pavić (Brazil) B Soares	6	7
4	(South Africa) R Klaasen (New Zealand) M Venus	6^{3}	6	[10]
(Finland) H Kontinen (Australia) J Peers	7^{7}	1	[8]
(United Kingdom) J Murray (United Kingdom) N Skupski	6	6
(Serbia) N Djokovic (Serbia) F Krajinović	3	2

Quarterfinals
1	(Colombia) JS Cabal (Colombia) R Farah	4	2
8	(Croatia) M Pavić (Brazil) B Soares	6	6
4	(South Africa) R Klaasen (New Zealand) M Venus	3	6^{5}
(United Kingdom) J Murray (United Kingdom) N Skupski	6	7^{7}

Semifinals
8	(Croatia) M Pavić (Brazil) B Soares	7	6
(United Kingdom) J Murray (United Kingdom) N Skupski	5	4

=== Bottom half ===
First round
6	(France) N Mahut (France) É Roger-Vasselin	6	6
WC	(China) M Gong (China) Ze Zhang	4	3
(Canada) F Auger-Aliassime (Italy) M Berrettini	6^{4}	7^{7}	[10]
(Croatia) N Mektić (Croatia) F Škugor	7^{7}	6^{5}	[4]
(Germany) J-L Struff (Spain) F Verdasco	3	3
(United States) R Ram (United Kingdom) J Salisbury	6	6
(Moldova) R Albot (Georgia (country)) N Basilashvili	2	3
3	(Spain) M Granollers (Argentina) H Zeballos	6	6
7	(Netherlands) J-J Rojer (Romania) H Tecău	7	6
(Argentina) D Schwartzman (Portugal) J Sousa	5	3
(Croatia) I Dodig (Slovakia) F Polášek	6	6
(Chile) C Garín (Serbia) D Lajović	2	3
(India) R Bopanna (Canada) D Shapovalov	6	6
(Russia) K Khachanov (Russia) A Rublev	1	4
WC	(Croatia) B Ćorić (China) R Hua	4	5
2	(Poland) Ł Kubot (Brazil) M Melo	6	7

Second round
6	(France) N Mahut (France) É Roger-Vasselin	^{w/o}
(Canada) F Auger-Aliassime (Italy) M Berrettini
(United States) R Ram (United Kingdom) J Salisbury	7^{8}	6
3	(Spain) M Granollers (Argentina) H Zeballos	6^{6}	3
7	(Netherlands) J-J Rojer (Romania) H Tecău	6^{3}	7^{7}	[7]
(Croatia) I Dodig (Slovakia) F Polášek	7^{7}	6^{4}	[10]
(India) R Bopanna (Canada) D Shapovalov	4	6	[7]
2	(Poland) Ł Kubot (Brazil) M Melo	6	3	[10]

Quarterfinals
6	(France) N Mahut (France) É Roger-Vasselin	6	3	[18]
(United States) R Ram (United Kingdom) J Salisbury	3	6	[16]
(Croatia) I Dodig (Slovakia) F Polášek	4	6^{2}
2	(Poland) Ł Kubot (Brazil) M Melo	6	7^{7}

Semifinals
6	(France) N Mahut (France) É Roger-Vasselin	2	4
2	(Poland) Ł Kubot (Brazil) M Melo	6	6
