= 2009 Shanghai ATP Masters 1000 – Singles =

Singles
- 2009 Shanghai ATP Masters 1000

Final
- Champion: (Russia) Nikolay Davydenko
- Runner-up: (Spain) Rafael Nadal
- Score: 7–6^{(7–3)}, 6–3

Events
Singles	Doubles
Shanghai Masters	· 2010 →

Nikolay Davydenko defeated Rafael Nadal in the final, 7–6^{(7–3)}, 6–3 to win the inaugural singles tennis title at the 2009 Shanghai Masters.

== Seeds ==
The top eight seeds receive a bye into the second round.

1. (Spain) Rafael Nadal (final)
2. (Serbia) Novak Djokovic (semifinals)
3. (Argentina) Juan Martín del Potro (second round, retired due to right wrist injury)
4. (United States) Andy Roddick (second round, retired due to left knee injury)
5. (France) Jo-Wilfried Tsonga (third round)
6. (Russia) Nikolay Davydenko (champion)
7. (Spain) Fernando Verdasco (second round)
8. (France) Gilles Simon (quarterfinals)
9. (Sweden) Robin Söderling (quarterfinals)
10. (Chile) Fernando González (third round)
11. (France) Gaël Monfils (third round, retired due to a back injury)
12. (Croatia) Marin Čilić (first round)
13. (Czech Republic) Radek Štěpánek (quarterfinals)
14. (Spain) Tommy Robredo (third round)
15. (Germany) Tommy Haas (second round, retired due to a right shoulder injury)
16. (Spain) David Ferrer (second round)

== Draw ==
=== Key ===
- Q = Qualifier
- WC = Wild card
- LL = Lucky loser
- Alt = Alternate
- SE = Special exempt
- PR = Protected ranking
- ITF = ITF entry
- JE = Junior exempt
- w/o = Walkover
- r = Retired
- d = Defaulted
- SR = Special ranking

=== Finals ===
Quarterfinals
1	(Spain) Rafael Nadal	3	6	0
(Croatia) Ivan Ljubičić	6	3	0^{r}
(Spain) Feliciano López	7	6
9	(Sweden) Robin Söderling	6^{4}	3
6	(Russia) Nikolay Davydenko	6	4	6
13	(Czech Republic) Radek Štěpánek	1	6	1
8	(France) Gilles Simon	3	6	2
2	(Serbia) Novak Djokovic	6	2	6

Semifinals
1	(Spain) Rafael Nadal	6	3
(Spain) Feliciano López	1	0^{r}
6	(Russia) Nikolay Davydenko	4	6	7
2	(Serbia) Novak Djokovic	6	4	6^{1}

Final
1	(Spain) Rafael Nadal	6^{3}	3
6	(Russia) Nikolay Davydenko	7	6

=== Top half ===
==== Section 1 ====
First round
(United States) J Blake	3	7	6
(Croatia) I Karlović	6	6^{4}	3
Q	(Germany) F Mayer	6	6
(Germany) P Petzschner	3	2
Q	(France) M Llodra	1	4
14	(Spain) T Robredo	6	6
11	(France) G Monfils	6	6
(France) P-H Mathieu	2	2
(Australia) L Hewitt	6	6
(United States) J Isner	2	4
(France) J Benneteau	3	6	1
(Croatia) I Ljubičić	6	3	6

Second round
1	(Spain) R Nadal	6	6^{4}	6
(United States) J Blake	2	7	4
Q	(Germany) F Mayer	6	6^{10}	4
14	(Spain) T Robredo	4	7	6
11	(France) G Monfils	4	6	6
(Australia) L Hewitt	6	4	2
(Croatia) I Ljubičić	6	7
7	(Spain) F Verdasco	4	6^{6}

Third round
1	(Spain) R Nadal	6	6
14	(Spain) T Robredo	1	4
11	(France) G Monfils	2	0^{r}
(Croatia) I Ljubičić	6	3

Quarterfinals
1	(Spain) R Nadal	3	6	0
(Croatia) I Ljubičić	6	3	0^{r}

==== Section 2 ====
First round
(France) J Chardy	4	4
(Austria) J Melzer	6	6
(Spain) F López	6	6
(Spain) G García López	3	4
(France) R Gasquet	4	3
16	(Spain) D Ferrer	6	6
9	(Sweden) R Söderling	6	6
(Romania) V Hănescu	3	4
(Germany) P Kohlschreiber	7	1	6^{8}
(Spain) N Almagro	6^{2}	6	7
WC	(China) S-X Zeng	2	6	6
(Israel) D Sela	6	1	4

Second round
3	(Argentina) JM del Potro	5	1^{r}
(Austria) J Melzer	7	2
(Spain) F López	4	7	6
16	(Spain) D Ferrer	6	5	1
9	(Sweden) R Söderling	6	7
(Spain) N Almagro	4	5
WC	(China) S-X Zeng	3	3
5	(France) J-W Tsonga	6	6

Third round
(Austria) J Melzer	7	6^{3}	1
(Spain) F López	5	7	6
9	(Sweden) R Söderling	6	6
5	(France) J-W Tsonga	3	3

Quarterfinals
(Spain) F López	7	6
9	(Sweden) R Söderling	6^{4}	3

=== Bottom half ===
==== Section 3 ====
First round
(Russia) I Kunitsyn	6^{6}	6	6
(Russia) I Andreev	7	4	2
Q	(Switzerland) M Chiudinelli	6^{3}	4
Q	(Brazil) T Bellucci	7	6
(Germany) M Zverev	5	7	2^{r}
10	(Chile) F González	7	6^{0}	2
13	(Czech Republic) R Štěpánek	6	6
(Spain) JC Ferrero	3	0
(Argentina) J Acasuso	6^{2}	0^{r}
(Germany) A Beck	7	1
Q	(Poland) Ł Kubot	6	6^{5}	6^{3}
(Switzerland) S Wawrinka	2	7	7

Second round
6	(Russia) N Davydenko	6	6
(Russia) I Kunitsyn	4	2
Q	(Brazil) T Bellucci	3	4
10	(Chile) F González	6	6
13	(Czech Republic) R Štěpánek	7	6
(Germany) A Beck	5	4
(Switzerland) S Wawrinka	3
4	(United States) A Roddick	4^{r}

Third round
6	(Russia) N Davydenko	6	7
10	(Chile) F González	3	5
13	(Czech Republic) R Štěpánek	3	7	4
(Switzerland) S Wawrinka	6	6^{5}	2^{r}

Quarterfinals
6	(Russia) N Davydenko	6	4	6
13	(Czech Republic) R Štěpánek	1	6	1

==== Section 4 ====
First round
(Serbia) V Troicki	6	6
(Argentina) J Mónaco	1	2
WC	(China) M-X Gong	4	4
WC	(Russia) M Safin	6	6
(Czech Republic) T Berdych	7	3	6
12	(Croatia) M Čilić	6^{8}	6	4
15	(Germany) T Haas	7	6
(Germany) B Becker	6^{5}	4
(Argentina) M Vassallo Argüello	4	6	6^{2}
Q	(Germany) R Schüttler	6	3	7
Q	(Italy) F Fognini	7	6
WC	(Latvia) E Gulbis	6^{3}	3

Second round
8	(France) G Simon	6	6
(Serbia) V Troicki	3	4
WC	(Russia) M Safin	6	4	4
(Czech Republic) T Berdych	3	6	6
15	(Germany) T Haas	4	0^{r}
Q	(Germany) R Schüttler	6	0
Q	(Italy) F Fognini	3	1
2	(Serbia) N Djokovic	6	6

Third round
8	(France) G Simon	6	6
(Czech Republic) T Berdych	3	4
Q	(Germany) R Schüttler	4	2
2	(Serbia) N Djokovic	6	6

Quarterfinals
8	(France) G Simon	3	6	2
2	(Serbia) N Djokovic	6	2	6

== Qualifying rounds ==
=== Seeds ===
1. (Brazil) Thomaz Bellucci (qualified)
2. (Argentina) Leonardo Mayer (first round)
3. (United States) Robby Ginepri (qualifying competition)
4. (Italy) Fabio Fognini (qualified)
5. (Germany) Florian Mayer (qualified)
6. (Germany) Rainer Schüttler (qualified)
7. (Switzerland) Marco Chiudinelli (qualified)
8. (United States) Brendan Evans (first round, retired due to back injury)
9. (France) Michaël Llodra (qualified)
10. (Thailand) Danai Udomchoke (first round)
11. (Poland) Łukasz Kubot (qualified)
12. (South Korea) Im Kyu-tae (qualifying competition)
13. (France) Édouard Roger-Vasselin (first round)
14. (United States) Michael Yani (qualifying competition)

=== Qualifiers ===
1. (Brazil) Thomaz Bellucci
2. (France) Michaël Llodra
3. (Poland) Łukasz Kubot
4. (Italy) Fabio Fognini
5. (Germany) Florian Mayer
6. (Germany) Rainer Schüttler
7. (Switzerland) Marco Chiudinelli

=== Qualifying draw ===
==== First qualifier ====
First round
1	(Brazil) Thomaz Bellucci	6	6
WC	(China) Zhang Ze	2	1
(South Korea) Jun Woong-sun	4	3
14	(United States) Michael Yani	6	6

Qualifying competition
1	(Brazil) Thomaz Bellucci	6	6
14	(United States) Michael Yani	3	1

==== Second qualifier ====
First round
2	(Argentina) Leonardo Mayer	4	6^{4}
Alt	(Austria) Oliver Marach	6	7^{7}
(China) Yu Xinyuan	4	3
9	(France) Michaël Llodra	6	6

Qualifying competition
Alt	(Austria) Oliver Marach	3	4
9	(France) Michaël Llodra	6	6

==== Third qualifier ====
First round
3	(United States) Robby Ginepri	6	6
WC	(China) Ya-Nan Ma	3	1
(Slovakia) Ivo Klec	3	4
11	(Poland) Łukasz Kubot	6	6

Qualifying competition
3	(United States) Robby Ginepri	2	7^{7}	3
11	(Poland) Łukasz Kubot	6	6^{2}	6

==== Fourth qualifier ====
First round
4	(Italy) Fabio Fognini	7	1	6
(Switzerland) George Bastl	5	6	1
(Slovenia) Luka Gregorc	6	2	6
10	(Thailand) Danai Udomchoke	4	6	3

Qualifying competition
4	(Italy) Fabio Fognini	6	6
(Slovenia) Luka Gregorc	3	2

==== Fifth qualifier ====
First round
5	(Germany) Florian Mayer	6	6
WC	(China) Wu Di	0	2
(Israel) Noam Okun	4	7^{7}	3
8	(United States) Brendan Evans	6	6^{2}	0^{r}

Qualifying competition
5	(Germany) Florian Mayer	6	6
(Israel) Noam Okun	3	4

==== Sixth qualifier ====
First round
6	(Germany) Rainer Schüttler	6	6
(Austria) Rainer Eitzinger	2	1
Alt	(Belgium) Dick Norman	7^{7}	7^{7}
13	(France) Édouard Roger-Vasselin	6^{3}	6^{2}

Qualifying competition
6	(Germany) Rainer Schüttler	6	6
Alt	(Belgium) Dick Norman	4	2

==== Seventh qualifier ====
First round
7	(Switzerland) Marco Chiudinelli	6	6
WC	(Chinese Taipei) Yang Tsung-hua	3	2
(Slovakia) Kamil Čapkovič	3	1
12	(South Korea) Im Kyu-tae	6	6

Qualifying competition
7	(Switzerland) Marco Chiudinelli	6	6
12	(South Korea) Im Kyu-tae	3	3
