= 2010 Shanghai Rolex Masters – Doubles =

Doubles
- 2010 Shanghai Rolex Masters

Final
- Champions: (Austria) Jürgen Melzer (India) Leander Paes
- Runners-up: (Poland) Mariusz Fyrstenberg (Poland) Marcin Matkowski
- Score: 7–5, 4–6, [10–5]

Events
Singles	Doubles
← 2009 ·	Shanghai Masters	· 2011 →

Julien Benneteau and Jo-Wilfried Tsonga were the defending champions, but Benneteau chose to not participate due to left wrist injury.
Tsonga partnered with Michaël Llodra, but they were eliminated by Novak Djokovic and Jonathan Erlich already in the first round.
3rd seeds Jürgen Melzer and Leander Paes won in the final match 7–5, 4–6, [10–5], against Mariusz Fyrstenberg and Marcin Matkowski.

== Seeds ==
All seed pairs received a bye to the second round.

1. (United States) Bob Bryan / (United States) Mike Bryan (semifinals)
2. (Canada) Daniel Nestor / (Serbia) Nenad Zimonjić (quarterfinals)
3. (Austria) Jürgen Melzer / (India) Leander Paes (champions)
4. (Poland) Łukasz Kubot / (Austria) Oliver Marach (semifinals)
5. (India) Mahesh Bhupathi / (Belarus) Max Mirnyi (quarterfinals)
6. (Poland) Mariusz Fyrstenberg / (Poland) Marcin Matkowski (final)
7. (Czech Republic) František Čermák / (Slovakia) Michal Mertiňák (quarterfinals)
8. (South Africa) Wesley Moodie / (Belgium) Dick Norman (second round)

== Draw ==
=== Key ===
- Q = Qualifier
- WC = Wild card
- LL = Lucky loser
- Alt = Alternate
- SE = Special exempt
- PR = Protected ranking
- ITF = ITF entry
- JE = Junior exempt
- w/o = Walkover
- r = Retired
- d = Defaulted
- SR = Special ranking

=== Finals ===
Semifinals
1	(United States) Bob Bryan (United States) Mike Bryan	5	1
3	(Austria) Jürgen Melzer (India) Leander Paes	7	6
4	(Poland) Łukasz Kubot (Austria) Oliver Marach	6^{7}	6	[6]
6	(Poland) Mariusz Fyrstenberg (Poland) Marcin Matkowski	7	1	[10]

Final
3	(Austria) Jürgen Melzer (India) Leander Paes	7	4	[10]
6	(Poland) Mariusz Fyrstenberg (Poland) Marcin Matkowski	5	6	[5]

=== Top half ===
First round
(Ukraine) S Stakhovsky (Russia) M Youzhny	3	6	[9]
(Sweden) S Aspelin (Australia) P Hanley	6	4	[11]
(Czech Republic) L Dlouhý (Czech Republic) R Štěpánek	6	6^{1}	[10]
(United States) J Isner (United States) S Querrey	3	7	[6]
WC	(China) B Yan (China) Z Zhang	5	4
ALT	(Brazil) T Bellucci (Serbia) J Tipsarević	7	6
(The Bahamas) M Knowles (Germany) P Kohlschreiber	6^{7}	2
(India) R Bopanna (Pakistan) A-u-H Qureshi	7	6

Second round
1	(United States) B Bryan (United States) M Bryan	6	7
(Sweden) S Aspelin (Australia) P Hanley	3	5
(Czech Republic) L Dlouhý (Czech Republic) R Štěpánek	6^{4}	6	[8]
7	(Czech Republic) F Čermák (Slovakia) M Mertiňák	7	4	[10]
3	(Austria) J Melzer (India) L Paes	6	6
ALT	(Brazil) T Bellucci (Serbia) J Tipsarević	3	3
(India) R Bopanna (Pakistan) A-u-H Qureshi	6	7
8	(South Africa) W Moodie (Belgium) D Norman	3	5

Quarterfinals
1	(United States) B Bryan (United States) M Bryan	6	6
7	(Czech Republic) F Čermák (Slovakia) M Mertiňák	3	2
3	(Austria) J Melzer (India) L Paes	6^{6}	7	[10]
(India) R Bopanna (Pakistan) A-u-H Qureshi	7	6^{8}	[4]

Semifinals
1	(United States) B Bryan (United States) M Bryan	5	1
3	(Austria) J Melzer (India) L Paes	7	6

=== Bottom half ===
First round
ALT	(Chinese Taipei) Y-h Lu (Germany) F Mayer	1	1
(Spain) M López (Spain) T Robredo	6	6
(Austria) J Knowle (Israel) A Ram	4	6	[5]
(Sweden) R Lindstedt (Romania) H Tecău	6	2	[10]
(Spain) N Almagro (Spain) D Marrero	4	6	[10]
WC	(China) M Gong (China) Z Li	6	2	[5]
(France) M Llodra (France) J-W Tsonga	3	1
(Serbia) N Djokovic (Israel) J Erlich	6	6

Second round
5	(India) M Bhupathi (Belarus) M Mirnyi	6	6
(Spain) M López (Spain) T Robredo	3	1
(Sweden) R Lindstedt (Romania) H Tecău	4	5
4	(Poland) Ł Kubot (Austria) O Marach	6	7
6	(Poland) M Fyrstenberg (Poland) M Matkowski	w/o
(Spain) N Almagro (Spain) D Marrero
(Serbia) N Djokovic (Israel) J Erlich	6^{4}	6	[5]
2	(Canada) D Nestor (Serbia) N Zimonjić	7	4	[10]

Quarterfinals
5	(India) M Bhupathi (Belarus) M Mirnyi	4	6	[6]
4	(Poland) Ł Kubot (Austria) O Marach	6	3	[10]
6	(Poland) M Fyrstenberg (Poland) M Matkowski	6	6
2	(Canada) D Nestor (Serbia) N Zimonjić	4	3

Semifinals
4	(Poland) Ł Kubot (Austria) O Marach	6^{7}	6	[6]
6	(Poland) M Fyrstenberg (Poland) M Matkowski	7	1	[10]
