= 2009 Shanghai ATP Masters 1000 – Doubles =

Doubles
- 2009 Shanghai ATP Masters 1000

Final
- Champions: (France) Julien Benneteau (France) Jo-Wilfried Tsonga
- Runners-up: (Poland) Mariusz Fyrstenberg (Poland) Marcin Matkowski
- Score: 6–2, 6–4

Events
Singles	Doubles
Shanghai Masters	· 2010 →

Julien Benneteau and Jo-Wilfried Tsonga defeated Mariusz Fyrstenberg and Marcin Matkowski in the final, 6–2, 6–4 to win the doubles tennis title at the 2009 Shanghai Masters.

== Seeds ==
All eight seeds receive a bye into the second round.

1. (Canada) Daniel Nestor / (Serbia) Nenad Zimonjić (second round)
2. (United States) Mike Bryan / (United States) Mike Bryan (quarterfinals)
3. (India) Mahesh Bhupathi / (The Bahamas) Mark Knowles (semifinals)
4. (Belarus) Max Mirnyi / (Israel) Andy Ram (second round)
5. (South Africa) Wesley Moodie / (Belgium) Dick Norman (quarterfinals)
6. (Poland) Mariusz Fyrstenberg / (Poland) Marcin Matkowski (final)
7. (Brazil) Bruno Soares / (Zimbabwe) Kevin Ullyett (second round)
8. (Poland) Łukasz Kubot / (Austria) Oliver Marach (quarterfinals)

== Draw ==
Key

- Q = Qualifier
- WC = Wild card
- LL = Lucky loser
- Alt = Alternate
- ITF = ITF entry
- PR = Protected ranking
- SR = Special ranking
- SE = Special exempt
- JE = Junior exempt
- JR = Junior Accelerator Programme entrant
- CO = College Accelerator Programme entrant
- NG = Next Gen Accelerator Program entrant
- w/o = Walkover
- r = Retired
- d = Defaulted

=== Finals ===
Semifinals
(France) Julien Benneteau (France) Jo-Wilfried Tsonga	7	6
3	(India) Mahesh Bhupathi (The Bahamas) Mark Knowles	6^{2}	2
(Austria) Julian Knowle (Austria) Jürgen Melzer	1	4
6	(Poland) Mariusz Fyrstenberg (Poland) Marcin Matkowski	6	6

Final
(France) Julien Benneteau (France) Jo-Wilfried Tsonga	6	6
6	(Poland) Mariusz Fyrstenberg (Poland) Marcin Matkowski	2	4

=== Top half ===
First round
(France) M Llodra (Czech Republic) R Štěpánek	5	5
(France) J Benneteau (France) J-W Tsonga	7	7
(Czech Republic) M Damm (Sweden) R Lindstedt	6	6^{4}	[9]
(Czech Republic) F Čermák (Slovakia) M Mertiňák	4	7	[11]
(United States) J Blake (United States) J Isner	5	2
(United States) T Parrott (Slovakia) F Polášek	7	6
WC	(China) Z Li (China) YJ Wang	6^{5}	0
(Germany) B Becker (Germany) T Haas	7	6

Second round
1	(Canada) D Nestor (Serbia) N Zimonjić	4	4
(France) J Benneteau (France) J-W Tsonga	6	6
(Czech Republic) F Čermák (Slovakia) M Mertiňák	5	6	[10]
7	(Brazil) B Soares (Zimbabwe) K Ullyett	7	3	[5]
3	(India) M Bhupathi (The Bahamas) M Knowles	7	3	[10]
(United States) T Parrott (Slovakia) F Polášek	5	6	[4]
(Germany) B Becker (Germany) T Haas
8	(Poland) Ł Kubot (Austria) O Marach	w/o

Quarterfinals
(France) J Benneteau (France) J-W Tsonga	3	6	[10]
(Czech Republic) F Čermák (Slovakia) M Mertiňák	6	4	[7]
3	(India) M Bhupathi (The Bahamas) M Knowles	4	6	[10]
8	(Poland) Ł Kubot (Austria) O Marach	6	3	[5]

Semifinals
(France) J Benneteau (France) J-W Tsonga	7	6
3	(India) M Bhupathi (The Bahamas) M Knowles	6^{2}	2

=== Bottom half ===
First round
(Argentina) J Mónaco (Spain) T Robredo	5	6^{5}
(Spain) F López (Spain) F Verdasco	7	7
(Austria) J Knowle (Austria) J Melzer	6	6
WC	(China) W Gao (China) X Yu	3	3
(Czech Republic) T Berdych (Germany) P Kohlschreiber
(Czech Republic) L Dlouhý (Germany) P Petzschner	w/o
(Sweden) S Aspelin (Australia) P Hanley	4	6	[11]
(South Africa) J Coetzee (Australia) S Huss	6	3	[9]

Second round
5	(South Africa) W Moodie (Belgium) D Norman	w/o
(Spain) F López (Spain) F Verdasco
(Austria) J Knowle (Austria) J Melzer	5	6	[10]
4	(Belarus) M Mirnyi (Israel) A Ram	7	3	[7]
6	(Poland) M Fyrstenberg (Poland) M Matkowski	6	7
(Czech Republic) L Dlouhý (Germany) P Petzschner	2	6^{3}
(Sweden) S Aspelin (Australia) P Hanley	3	2
2	(United States) B Bryan (United States) M Bryan	6	6

Quarterfinals
5	(South Africa) W Moodie (Belgium) D Norman	6	6^{6}	[6]
(Austria) J Knowle (Austria) J Melzer	4	7	[10]
6	(Poland) M Fyrstenberg (Poland) M Matkowski	6	5	[10]
2	(United States) B Bryan (United States) M Bryan	1	7	[8]

Semifinals
(Austria) J Knowle (Austria) J Melzer	1	4
6	(Poland) M Fyrstenberg (Poland) M Matkowski	6	6
