= 2010 Shanghai Rolex Masters – Singles =

Tennis event results

Singles
- 2010 Shanghai Rolex Masters

Final
- Champion: (United Kingdom) Andy Murray
- Runner-up: (Switzerland) Roger Federer
- Score: 6–3, 6–2

Events
Singles	Doubles
← 2009 ·	Shanghai Masters	· 2011 →

Andy Murray defeated Roger Federer in the final, 6–3, 6–2 to win the singles tennis title at the 2010 Shanghai Masters.

Nikolay Davydenko was the defending champion, but lost in the second round to Mischa Zverev.

Rafael Nadal's loss in the third round ended his record streak of 20 consecutive Masters 1000 quarterfinals.

== Seeds ==
The top eight seeds receive a bye into the second round.

1. (Spain) Rafael Nadal (third round)
2. (Serbia) Novak Djokovic (semifinals)
3. (Switzerland) Roger Federer (final)
4. (United Kingdom) Andy Murray (champion)
5. (Sweden) Robin Söderling (quarterfinals)
6. (Russia) Nikolay Davydenko (second round)
7. (Czech Republic) Tomáš Berdych (third round)
8. (Russia) Mikhail Youzhny (second round)
9. (Spain) Fernando Verdasco (first round)
10. (United States) Andy Roddick (second round, retired due to a right groin injury)
11. (Spain) David Ferrer (third round)
12. (France) Jo-Wilfried Tsonga (quarterfinals)
13. (Austria) Jürgen Melzer (quarterfinals)
14. (Croatia) Marin Čilić (first round)
15. (France) Gaël Monfils (second round)
16. (Spain) Nicolás Almagro (first round)

== Main draw ==
Key

- Q = Qualifier
- WC = Wild card
- LL = Lucky loser
- Alt = Alternate
- ITF = ITF entry
- PR = Protected ranking
- SR = Special ranking
- SE = Special exempt
- JE = Junior exempt
- JR = Junior Accelerator Programme entrant
- CO = College Accelerator Programme entrant
- NG = Next Gen Accelerator Program entrant
- w/o = Walkover
- r = Retired
- d = Defaulted

=== Finals ===
Quarterfinals
13	(Austria) Jürgen Melzer	7^{8}	5	2
(Argentina) Juan Mónaco	6^{6}	7	6
4	(United Kingdom) Andy Murray	6	6
12	(France) Jo-Wilfried Tsonga	2	2
5	(Sweden) Robin Söderling	1	1
3	(Switzerland) Roger Federer	6	6
(Spain) Guillermo García López	2	3
2	(Serbia) Novak Djokovic	6	6

Semifinals
(Argentina) Juan Mónaco	4	1
4	(United Kingdom) Andy Murray	6	6
3	(Switzerland) Roger Federer	7	6
2	(Serbia) Novak Djokovic	5	4

Final
4	(United Kingdom) Andy Murray	6	6
3	(Switzerland) Roger Federer	3	2

=== Top half ===
==== Section 1 ====
First round
(France) G Simon	4	1
(Switzerland) S Wawrinka	6	6
(Uzbekistan) D Istomin	6	3	3
LL	(Spain) D Gimeno Traver	3	6	6
WC	(Chinese Taipei) T-h Yang	4	6^{5}
13	(Austria) J Melzer	6	7^{7}
9	(Spain) F Verdasco	6^{4}	5
(Netherlands) T de Bakker	7^{7}	7
(Argentina) J Mónaco	6	7^{7}
Q	(France) F Serra	4	6^{3}
Q	(Germany) M Zverev	6	4	7^{9}
(Ukraine) S Stakhovsky	1	6	6^{7}

Second round
1	(Spain) R Nadal	6	6
(Switzerland) S Wawrinka	4	4
LL	(Spain) D Gimeno Traver	3	6^{2}
13	(Austria) J Melzer	6	7^{7}
(Netherlands) T de Bakker	6	3	4
(Argentina) J Mónaco	2	6	6
Q	(Germany) M Zverev	6	7^{7}
6	(Russia) N Davydenko	4	6^{3}

Third round
1	(Spain) R Nadal	1	6	3
13	(Austria) J Melzer	6	3	6
(Argentina) J Mónaco	6	6
Q	(Germany) M Zverev	0	2

Quarterfinals
13	(Austria) J Melzer	7^{8}	5	2
(Argentina) J Mónaco	6^{6}	7	6

==== Section 2 ====
First round
(Czech Republic) R Štěpánek	3	4
WC	(China) Y Bai	6	6
Q	(France) J Chardy	7^{7}	6
(Cyprus) M Baghdatis	6^{4}	1
(Ukraine) A Dolgopolov	2	7	7^{7}
16	(Spain) N Almagro	6	5	6^{3}
12	(France) J-W Tsonga	7^{7}	6
(Spain) F López	6^{4}	3
(United States) S Querrey	6	7^{8}
(Germany) M Berrer	3	6^{6}
(Germany) F Mayer	6	6
Q	(South Africa) K Anderson	2	2

Second round
4	(United Kingdom) A Murray	6	6
WC	(China) Y Bai	2	2
Q	(France) J Chardy	6	5	6
(Ukraine) A Dolgopolov	1	7	2
12	(France) J-W Tsonga	7^{9}	6
(United States) S Querrey	6^{7}	1
(Germany) F Mayer	6	6^{5}	6
8	(Russia) M Youzhny	4	7^{7}	1

Third round
4	(United Kingdom) A Murray	6	6
Q	(France) J Chardy	3	4
12	(France) J-W Tsonga	7	6
(Germany) F Mayer	5	3

Quarterfinals
4	(United Kingdom) A Murray	6	6
12	(France) J-W Tsonga	2	2

=== Bottom half ===
==== Section 3 ====
First round
(Kazakhstan) A Golubev	3	4
(Serbia) J Tipsarević	6	6
(Brazil) T Bellucci	6	2	7^{7}
Q	(Turkey) M İlhan	1	6	6^{4}
(France) M Llodra	6^{2}	1
11	(Spain) D Ferrer	7^{7}	6
14	(Croatia) M Čilić	2	2
(Italy) A Seppi	6	6
WC	(China) D Wu	1	4
(Chinese Taipei) Y-h Lu	6	6
Q	(Poland) Ł Kubot	6	6^{9}	6^{7}
(United States) J Isner	4	7^{11}	7^{9}

Second round
5	(Sweden) R Söderling	6	7^{7}
(Serbia) J Tipsarević	3	6^{5}
(Brazil) T Bellucci	6^{7}	3
11	(Spain) D Ferrer	7^{9}	6
(Italy) A Seppi	7^{7}	6
(Chinese Taipei) Y-h Lu	6^{4}	3
(United States) J Isner	3	4
3	(Switzerland) R Federer	6	6

Third round
5	(Sweden) R Söderling	7	6
11	(Spain) D Ferrer	5	4
(Italy) A Seppi	3	4
3	(Switzerland) R Federer	6	6

Quarterfinals
5	(Sweden) R Söderling	1	1
3	(Switzerland) R Federer	6	6

==== Section 4 ====
First round
(Spain) A Montañés	3	6^{4}
(Spain) T Robredo	6	7^{7}
(Argentina) E Schwank	7^{10}	2	4
(Spain) G García López	6^{8}	6	6
(Germany) P Kohlschreiber	3	1	r
10	(United States) A Roddick	6	2
15	(France) G Monfils	6	7
Q	(Germany) B Becker	1	5
(Latvia) E Gulbis	1	4
(France) R Gasquet	6	6
(Croatia) I Ljubičić	5	6	6
WC	(China) Z Zhang	7	3	4

Second round
7	(Czech Republic) T Berdych	6	6
(Spain) T Robredo	0	4
(Spain) G García López	3	3
10	(United States) A Roddick	6	2	r
15	(France) G Monfils	4	6	4
(France) R Gasquet	6	3	6
(Croatia) I Ljubičić	3	3
2	(Serbia) N Djokovic	6	6

Third round
7	(Czech Republic) T Berdych	6^{4}	3
(Spain) G García López	7^{7}	6
(France) R Gasquet	1	1
2	(Serbia) N Djokovic	6	6

Quarterfinals
(Spain) G García López	2	3
2	(Serbia) N Djokovic	6	6

== Qualifying rounds ==
=== Seeds ===
1. (Spain) Daniel Gimeno Traver (qualifying competition, lucky loser)
2. (France) Jérémy Chardy (qualified)
3. (Germany) Benjamin Becker (qualified)
4. (Colombia) Santiago Giraldo (qualifying competition)
5. (Poland) Łukasz Kubot (qualified)
6. (South Africa) Kevin Anderson (qualified)
7. (France) Florent Serra (qualified)
8. (Colombia) Alejandro Falla (first round)
9. (Kazakhstan) Mikhail Kukushkin (qualifying competition)
10. (Russia) Igor Andreev (first round)
11. (United States) Michael Russell (first round)
12. (Russia) Teymuraz Gabashvili (first round)
13. (Turkey) Marsel İlhan (qualified)
14. (Japan) Go Soeda (qualifying competition)

=== Qualifiers ===
1. (Turkey) Marsel İlhan
2. (France) Jérémy Chardy
3. (Germany) Benjamin Becker
4. (Germany) Mischa Zverev
5. (Poland) Łukasz Kubot
6. (South Africa) Kevin Anderson
7. (France) Florent Serra

=== Lucky loser ===
1. (Spain) Daniel Gimeno Traver

=== Qualifying draw ===
==== First qualifier ====
First round
1	(Spain) Daniel Gimeno Traver	7^{14}	6
(United States) Rajeev Ram	6^{12}	3
(France) Édouard Roger-Vasselin	3	0^{r}
13	(Turkey) Marsel İlhan	6	1

Qualifying competition
1	(Spain) Daniel Gimeno Traver	6	7^{7}
13	(Turkey) Marsel İlhan	3	6^{1}

==== Second qualifier ====
First round
2	(France) Jérémy Chardy	2	6	7
(France) Paul-Henri Mathieu	6	2	5
WC	(China) Ya-Nan Ma	1	2^{r}
14	(Japan) Go Soeda	6	4

Qualifying competition
2	(France) Jérémy Chardy	6	6
14	(Japan) Go Soeda	2	0

==== Third qualifier ====
First round
3	(Germany) Benjamin Becker	7	4	7^{7}
(Japan) Kei Nishikori	5	6	6^{4}
(Israel) Harel Levy	3	6	3
9	(Kazakhstan) Mikhail Kukushkin	6	3	6

Qualifying competition
3	(Germany) Benjamin Becker	6	4	6
9	(Kazakhstan) Mikhail Kukushkin	2	6	4

==== Fourth qualifier ====
First round
4	(Colombia) Santiago Giraldo	6	7
(China) Gong Maoxin	1	5
WC	(Germany) Mischa Zverev	7^{7}	6
10	(Russia) Igor Andreev	6^{3}	3

Qualifying competition
4	(Colombia) Santiago Giraldo	1	3
WC	(Germany) Mischa Zverev	6	6

==== Fifth qualifier ====
First round
5	(Poland) Łukasz Kubot	6^{6}	6	6
WC	(Czech Republic) Lukáš Dlouhý	7^{8}	4	2
(China) Li Zhe	6	4	7^{7}
12	(Russia) Teymuraz Gabashvili	4	6	6^{3}

Qualifying competition
5	(Poland) Łukasz Kubot	6	4	7^{9}
(China) Li Zhe	2	6	6^{7}

==== Sixth qualifier ====
First round
6	(South Africa) Kevin Anderson	6	6
(Croatia) Ivan Dodig	2	4
(Spain) Iván Navarro	6	2	6
8	(Colombia) Alejandro Falla	3	6	3

Qualifying competition
6	(South Africa) Kevin Anderson	6	6
(Spain) Iván Navarro	3	2

==== Seventh qualifier ====
First round
7	(France) Florent Serra	6	6
WC	(China) Wang Chuhan	3	2
(Slovenia) Grega Žemlja	2	6	6
11	(United States) Michael Russell	6	4	4

Qualifying competition
7	(France) Florent Serra	6	7^{7}
(Slovenia) Grega Žemlja	3	6^{1}
