= 2018 Shanghai Rolex Masters – Singles =

Singles
- 2018 Shanghai Rolex Masters

Final
- Champion: (Serbia) Novak Djokovic
- Runner-up: (Croatia) Borna Ćorić
- Score: 6–3, 6–4

Details
- Draw: 56 (7 Q / 4 WC )
- Seeds: 16

Events
Singles	Doubles
← 2017 ·	Shanghai Masters	· 2019 →

Novak Djokovic defeated Borna Ćorić in the final, 6–3, 6–4 to win the singles tennis title at the 2018 Shanghai Masters. It was his record fourth Shanghai Masters title, and 32nd Masters 1000 title overall. He did not lose a single set and did not have his serve broken throughout the entire tournament.

Roger Federer was the defending champion, but lost to Ćorić in the semifinals.

== Seeds ==
The top eight seeds receive a bye into the second round.

1. (Switzerland) Roger Federer (semifinals)
2. (Serbia) Novak Djokovic (champion)
3. (Argentina) Juan Martín del Potro (third round, retired due to right knee injury)
4. (Germany) Alexander Zverev (semifinals)
5. (Croatia) Marin Čilić (second round)
6. (Austria) Dominic Thiem (second round)
7. (South Africa) Kevin Anderson (quarterfinals)
8. (Japan) Kei Nishikori (quarterfinals)

9. (Argentina) Diego Schwartzman (first round)
10. (Greece) Stefanos Tsitsipas (third round)
11. (United Kingdom) Kyle Edmund (quarterfinals)
12. (United States) Jack Sock (first round)
13. (Croatia) Borna Ćorić (final)
14. (Canada) Milos Raonic (first round)
15. (Spain) Pablo Carreño Busta (first round)
16. (Italy) Marco Cecchinato (third round)

Click on the seed number of a player to go to their draw section.

== Draw ==
Key

- Q = Qualifier
- WC = Wild card
- LL = Lucky loser
- Alt = Alternate
- ITF = ITF entry
- PR = Protected ranking
- SR = Special ranking
- SE = Special exempt
- JE = Junior exempt
- JR = Junior Accelerator Programme entrant
- CO = College Accelerator Programme entrant
- NG = Next Gen Accelerator Program entrant
- w/o = Walkover
- r = Retired
- d = Defaulted

=== Finals ===
Quarterfinals
1	(Switzerland) Roger Federer	6	7^{7}
8	(Japan) Kei Nishikori	4	6^{4}
13	(Croatia) Borna Ćorić	7	6
(Australia) Matthew Ebden	5	4
11	(United Kingdom) Kyle Edmund	4	4
4	(Germany) Alexander Zverev	6	6
7	(South Africa) Kevin Anderson	6^{1}	3
2	(Serbia) Novak Djokovic	7^{7}	6

Semifinals
1	(Switzerland) Roger Federer	4	4
13	(Croatia) Borna Ćorić	6	6
4	(Germany) Alexander Zverev	2	1
2	(Serbia) Novak Djokovic	6	6

Final
13	(Croatia) Borna Ćorić	3	4
2	(Serbia) Novak Djokovic	6	6

=== Top half ===
==== Section 1 ====
First round
(Russia) D Medvedev	3	7^{9}	6
WC	(China) Ze Zhang	6	6^{7}	4
(Russia) A Rublev	3	4
(Spain) R Bautista Agut	6	6
Q	(United States) M McDonald	6	5	6
14	(Canada) M Raonic	3	7	3
9	(Argentina) D Schwartzman	3	4
(United States) S Querrey	6	6
Q	(United States) T Fritz	6	7^{7}
(Netherlands) R Haase	3	6^{3}
WC	(China) Y Wu	7^{7}	6
WC	(China) Z Li	6^{5}	2

Second round
1	(Switzerland) R Federer	6	4	6
(Russia) D Medvedev	4	6	4
(Spain) R Bautista Agut	3	6	6
Q	(United States) M McDonald	6	4	1
(United States) S Querrey	6	6^{4}	7
Q	(United States) T Fritz	3	7^{7}	5
WC	(China) Y Wu	6	0	3
8	(Japan) K Nishikori	3	6	6

Third round
1	(Switzerland) R Federer	6	2	6
(Spain) R Bautista Agut	3	6	4
(United States) S Querrey	6^{7}	4
8	(Japan) K Nishikori	7^{9}	6

Quarterfinals
1	(Switzerland) R Federer	6	7^{7}
8	(Japan) K Nishikori	4	6^{4}

==== Section 2 ====
First round
(Argentina) L Mayer	6	2	1
(France) R Gasquet	1	6	6
Q	(United States) B Klahn	4	6	6
(Australia) N Kyrgios	6	4	3
WC	(Switzerland) S Wawrinka	6	4	3
13	(Croatia) B Ćorić	4	6	6
12	(United States) J Sock	4	7^{8}	3
(Germany) P Gojowczyk	6	6^{6}	6
(Bosnia and Herzegovina) D Džumhur	3	4
(Hungary) M Fucsovics	6	6
(Australia) M Ebden	3	6	6
(United States) F Tiafoe	6	4	3

Second round
3	(Argentina) JM del Potro	7	7^{9}
(France) R Gasquet	5	6^{7}
Q	(United States) B Klahn	4	2
13	(Croatia) B Ćorić	6	6
(Germany) P Gojowczyk	6	6^{3}	7^{7}
(Hungary) M Fucsovics	4	7^{7}	6^{5}
(Australia) M Ebden	6	6^{8}	7^{7}
6	(Austria) D Thiem	4	7^{10}	6^{4}

Third round
3	(Argentina) JM del Potro	5	0^{r}
13	(Croatia) B Ćorić	7	0
(Germany) P Gojowczyk	2	3
(Australia) M Ebden	6	6

Quarterfinals
13	(Croatia) B Ćorić	7	6
(Australia) M Ebden	5	4

=== Bottom half ===
==== Section 3 ====
First round
(Chile) N Jarry	6	3	7^{7}
(Germany) M Zverev	4	6	6^{5}
(France) A Mannarino	4	4
(Italy) A Seppi	6	6
(Serbia) F Krajinović	5	3
11	(United Kingdom) K Edmund	7	6
15	(Spain) P Carreño Busta	3	4
Q	(France) B Paire	6	6
Q	(Canada) V Pospisil	4	6^{4}
(Australia) A de Minaur	6	7^{7}
(Canada) D Shapovalov	2	2
(Georgia (country)) N Basilashvili	6	6

Second round
5	(Croatia) M Čilić	6	6^{6}	5
(Chile) N Jarry	2	7^{8}	7
(Italy) A Seppi	3	4
11	(United Kingdom) K Edmund	6	6
Q	(France) B Paire	4	3
(Australia) A de Minaur	6	6
(Georgia (country)) N Basilashvili	5	4
4	(Germany) A Zverev	7	6

Third round
(Chile) N Jarry	6^{5}	3
11	(United Kingdom) K Edmund	7^{7}	6
(Australia) A de Minaur	1	4
4	(Germany) A Zverev	6	6

Quarterfinals
11	(United Kingdom) K Edmund	4	4
4	(Germany) A Zverev	6	6

==== Section 4 ====
First round
Q	(Kazakhstan) M Kukushkin	6	6
(Spain) A Ramos Viñolas	4	2
(United States) S Johnson	7^{8}	3	4
(Russia) K Khachanov	6^{6}	6	6
(France) G Monfils	6^{4}	6	4
10	(Greece) S Tsitsipas	7^{7}	4	6
16	(Italy) M Cecchinato	6^{4}	6	7^{7}
(France) G Simon	7^{7}	4	6^{2}
Q	(Poland) H Hurkacz	4	6	1
(South Korea) H Chung	6	2	6
(Germany) M Marterer	3	6^{5}
(France) J Chardy	6	7^{7}

Second round
7	(South Africa) K Anderson	6	6
Q	(Kazakhstan) M Kukushkin	3	2
(Russia) K Khachanov	4	6^{8}
10	(Greece) S Tsitsipas	6	7^{10}
16	(Italy) M Cecchinato	4	7^{7}	7^{7}
(South Korea) H Chung	6	6^{5}	6^{5}
(France) J Chardy	3	5
2	(Serbia) N Djokovic	6	7

Third round
7	(South Africa) K Anderson	6	7^{7}
10	(Greece) S Tsitsipas	4	6^{1}
16	(Italy) M Cecchinato	4	0
2	(Serbia) N Djokovic	6	6

Quarterfinals
7	(South Africa) K Anderson	6^{1}	3
2	(Serbia) N Djokovic	7^{7}	6

== Qualifying ==
=== Seeds ===
1. (Australia) John Millman (first round)
2. (Portugal) João Sousa (qualifying competition)
3. (Australia) Matthew Ebden (moved to main draw)
4. (Slovakia) Martin Kližan (qualifying competition)
5. (Serbia) Dušan Lajović (first round, retired)
6. (Italy) Matteo Berrettini (qualifying competition)
7. (United States) Tennys Sandgren (first round)
8. (United States) Taylor Fritz (qualified)
9. (France) Benoît Paire (qualified)
10. (United States) Denis Kudla (first round)
11. (Spain) Feliciano López (first round)
12. (Japan) Taro Daniel (qualifying competition)
13. (United Kingdom) Cameron Norrie (first round)
14. (United States) Mackenzie McDonald (qualified)

=== Qualifiers ===
1. (United States) Mackenzie McDonald
2. (France) Benoît Paire
3. (Canada) Vasek Pospisil
4. (United States) Taylor Fritz
5. (Poland) Hubert Hurkacz
6. (Kazakhstan) Mikhail Kukushkin
7. (United States) Bradley Klahn

=== Qualifying draw ===
==== First qualifier ====
First round
1	(Australia) John Millman	4	4
Alt	(Moldova) Radu Albot	6	6
(Russia) Evgeny Donskoy	3	4
14	(United States) Mackenzie McDonald	6	6

Qualifying competition
Alt	(Moldova) Radu Albot	6	3	1
14	(United States) Mackenzie McDonald	2	6	6

==== Second qualifier ====
First round
2	(Portugal) João Sousa	6	7^{8}
WC	(China) Zhang Zhizhen	3	6^{6}
WC	(China) Hua Runhao	6	3	4
9	(France) Benoît Paire	3	6	6

Qualifying competition
2	(Portugal) João Sousa	7^{7}	4	4
9	(France) Benoît Paire	6^{4}	6	6

==== Third qualifier ====
First round
Alt	(Italy) Thomas Fabbiano	4	3
(Canada) Vasek Pospisil	6	6
(Romania) Marius Copil	7^{7}	6
10	(United States) Denis Kudla	6^{3}	4

Qualifying competition
(Canada) Vasek Pospisil	6^{5}	6	7
(Romania) Marius Copil	7^{7}	4	5

==== Fourth qualifier ====
First round
4	(Slovakia) Martin Kližan	6	6
WC	(China) Te Rigele	3	4
Alt	(Argentina) Horacio Zeballos	3	2
8	(United States) Taylor Fritz	6	6

Qualifying competition
4	(Slovakia) Martin Kližan	6	3	4
8	(United States) Taylor Fritz	3	6	6

==== Fifth qualifier ====
First round
5	(Serbia) Dušan Lajović	6	0	0^{r}
(Poland) Hubert Hurkacz	4	6	3
Alt	(India) Ramkumar Ramanathan	7	6
13	(United Kingdom) Cameron Norrie	5	3

Qualifying competition
(Poland) Hubert Hurkacz	6^{4}	6	7
Alt	(India) Ramkumar Ramanathan	7^{7}	4	5

==== Sixth qualifier ====
First round
6	(Italy) Matteo Berrettini	6	6
WC	(China) Wu Di	4	2
(Kazakhstan) Mikhail Kukushkin	6	6
11	(Spain) Feliciano López	3	1

Qualifying competition
6	(Italy) Matteo Berrettini	5	4
(Kazakhstan) Mikhail Kukushkin	7	6

==== Seventh qualifier ====
First round
7	(United States) Tennys Sandgren	6	3	4
(United States) Bradley Klahn	4	6	6
(United States) Tim Smyczek	7^{9}	4	4
12	(Japan) Taro Daniel	6^{7}	6	6

Qualifying competition
(United States) Bradley Klahn	7^{7}	7^{7}
12	(Japan) Taro Daniel	6^{5}	6^{3}
