= Shanghai Masters (tennis) =

Coordinates: 31.041°N 121.355°E

ATP Tour
- Tour: ATP Tour
- Founded: 2009; 17 years ago
- Editions: 14 (2025)
- Location: Shanghai, China
- Venue: Qizhong Forest Sports City Arena
- Category: ATP 1000
- Surface: Hard – outdoors
- Draw: 96S / 48Q / 32D
- Prize money: $9,415,725 (2026)
- Website: rolexshanghaimasters.com

Current champions (2026)
- Singles: (Spain) Alejandro Davidovich Fokina
- Doubles: (Austria) Lucas Miedler (Austria) Neil Oberleitner

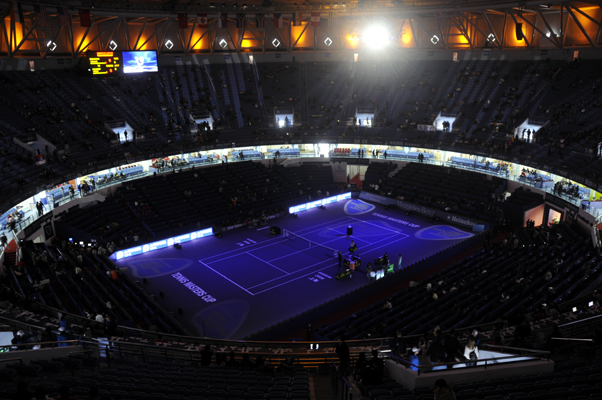
Qizhong Forest Sports City Arena tennis court

The Shanghai Masters (Chinese: 上海大师赛), known as the Rolex Shanghai Masters for sponsorship reasons, is an annual tennis tournament for male professional players held in Shanghai, China in the month of October. It is played on outdoor hard courts at the Qizhong Forest Sports City Arena in the Minhang District. The tournament is part of the nine Masters 1000 events on the ATP Tour, and is the only one not played in Europe or North America. The tournament was not held from 2020 to 2022 due to Chinese travel restrictions related to the COVID-19 pandemic.

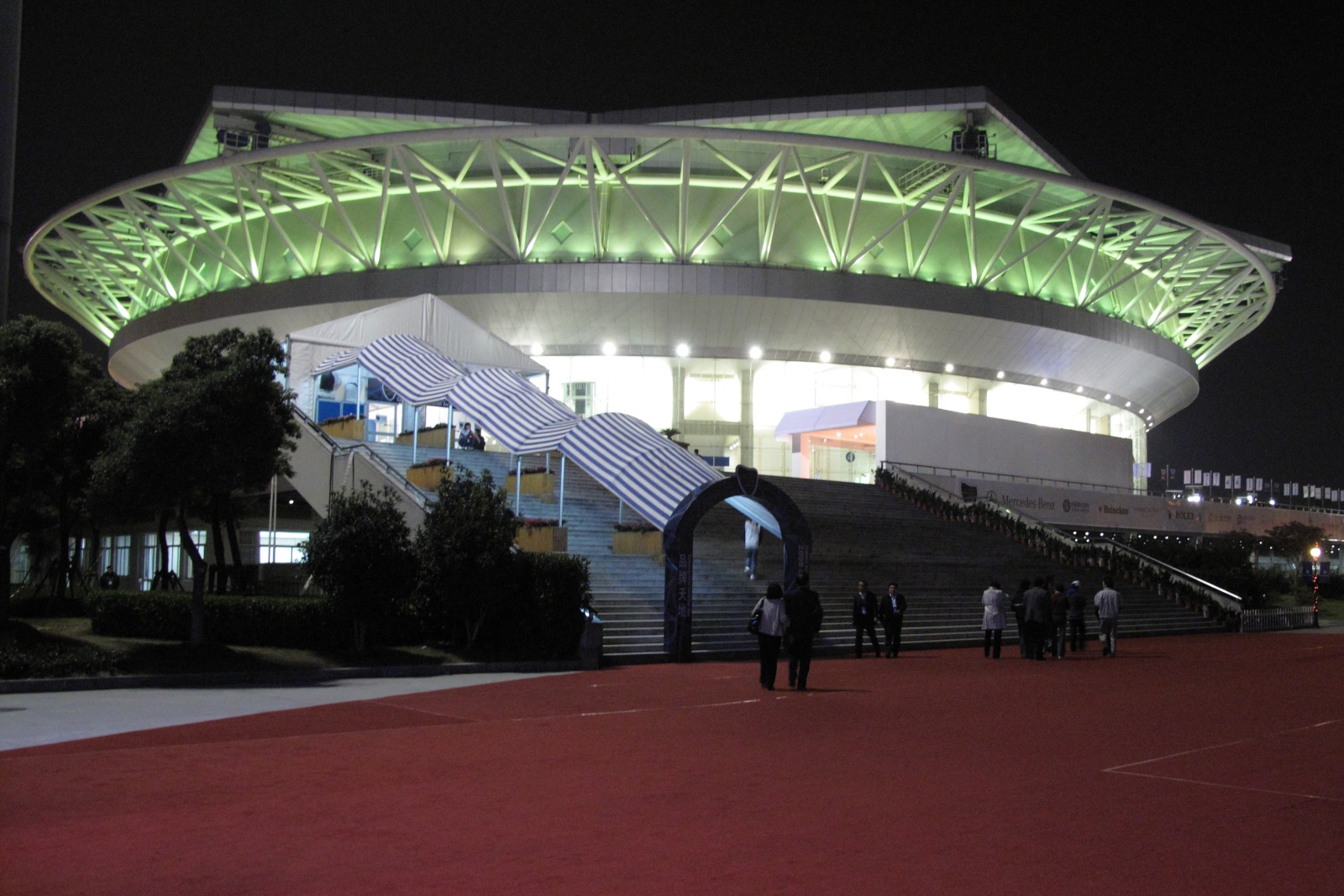
The Qizhong Stadium at the time of the 2008 Tennis Masters Cup

== Venue ==
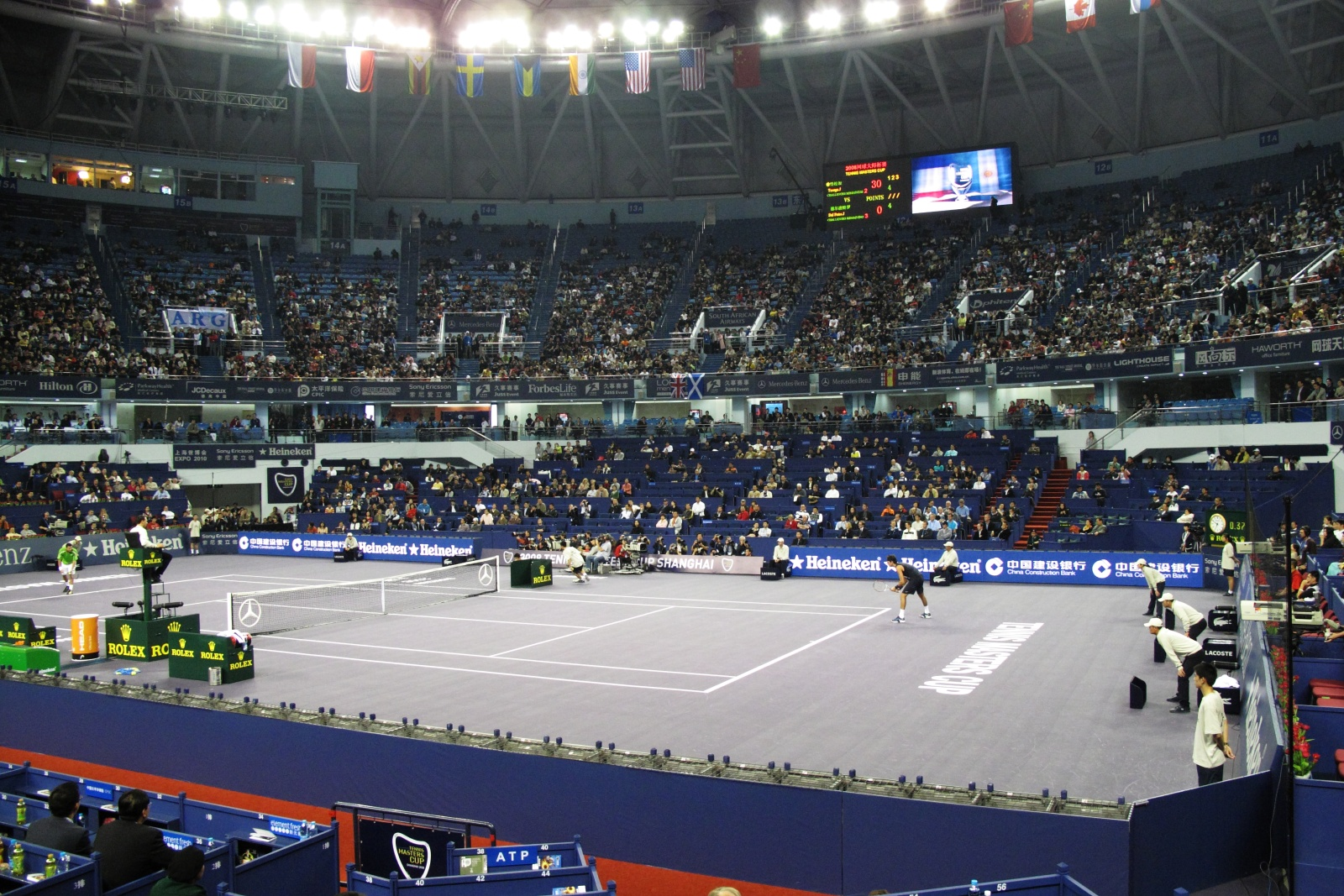
The Qizhong Arena main court, during the 2008 Tennis Masters Cup

All matches are played in outdoor conditions at the Qizhong Arena, after the venue held the Tennis Masters Cup indoors from 2005 to 2008. The surface is hard court, specifically DecoTurf.

The venue was originally built in 2004 and 2005 to host the Tennis Masters Cup, after the ATP awarded the tournament to Shanghai for a three-year contract (2005–2007), later extended to a fourth year. The site was conceived to become the largest tennis venue in Asia, with a 15,000-seats main stadium featuring a retractable roof of eight steel panels representing Shanghai's city flower, the magnolia. As of 2013, the Arena's Grand Stand Court 1 stands in fifth place in the list of tennis stadiums by capacity, alongside Beijing's National Tennis Stadium (built for the 2008 Summer Olympics) and Wimbledon's Centre Court.

In preparation of the first edition of the Shanghai Masters, the venue was expanded with several new stadiums and courts constructed by August 2009, including a Grand Stand Court 2, with a seating capacity of 5,000 spectators, and a Grand Stand Court 3, with a seating capacity of 3,000 spectators.

== History ==
The Shanghai ATP Masters 1000 was established to fulfill the desire of the ATP World Tour and the Chinese Tennis Association to develop the market for tennis in China and Asia in general. In 2010 following a sponsorship deal the tournament was renamed the Shanghai Rolex Masters.

In 1996, a professional tournament was held for the first time in Shanghai, the largest city in China. The inaugural Shanghai Open was won by Russian Andrei Olhovskiy over Mark Knowles of the Bahamas. In 2002 the year-end championships, then called the Tennis Masters Cup. were held in the city. The success of the 2002 Tennis Masters Cup, won by World No. 1 Lleyton Hewitt from Australia, prompted the ATP, which had abandoned the idea of a touring Tennis Masters Cup, to award Shanghai the right to hold the tournament from 2005 to 2007.

While the ATP International Series tournament of Shanghai was held two more years in 2003 and 2004 at the Shanghai New International Expo Center created for the 2002 Tennis Masters Cup, a new facility, the Qizhong Forest Sports City Arena, was built to host the year-end championships starting from 2005. The ATP eventually extended the three-year deal to a fourth year in 2006, allowing the Tennis Masters Cup to increase its success in Shanghai. Over the four years spent at the Qizhong venue, the tournament saw Swiss World No. 1 Roger Federer reach three finals, losing the first in 2005 to Argentine David Nalbandian before winning the following two in 2006 and 2007, and Novak Djokovic of Serbia taking the 2008 title.

In March 2007, the ATP announced that their 2009 rebranding would also be the occasion to use the Qizhong facility and the Shanghai Tennis Masters Cup organisation to host an ATP World Tour Masters 1000 event in the city, the equivalent of what were then the ATP Masters Series. Shanghai was eventually given the October spot in the calendar, previously held by the Mutua Madrileña Masters Madrid indoor hard courts event, but was to be held as an outdoor hard surface tournament, thereby reducing the number of indoor Masters events to one, that being the Paris Masters. The new Mutua Madrileña Madrid Open moved to outdoor red clay courts during the spring European clay court season. The Tennis Masters Cup became the ATP World Tour Finals and moved to the O2 arena in London, United Kingdom.

Organized by Juss International Sports Event Management Company directed by Jiang Lan, the event was formally presented in a press conference on November 13, 2008, during the season's Tennis Masters Cup tournament, where the choice of the draw sizes, of the surface, and the building of additional courts were announced. Rolex, the Swiss watch company, was also revealed as the official sponsor of the event. The promotional campaign for the tournament started in early 2009, with the presentation of its slogan, "Simply The Best", and the event was officially launched on May 5, 2009. Expecting nearly 150,000 spectators during the tournament, the Shanghai Rolex Masters was introduced as the flagship of an Asian swing in the 2009 ATP World Tour calendar after the late September ATP World Tour 250 Thailand Open of Bangkok and Malaysian Open of Kuala Lumpur, and then early October ATP World Tour 500 Japan Open Tennis Championships of Tokyo and China Open of Beijing.

== Past finals ==
In singles, Novak Djokovic (winner in 2012–13, 2015, and 2018) holds the record for most titles (four). Djokovic and Andy Murray share the records for most consecutive titles (two victories in a row each). In doubles, Marcelo Melo (winner in 2013, 2015, and 2018) holds the record for most titles (three), and no player has collected back-to-back titles yet.

=== Singles ===
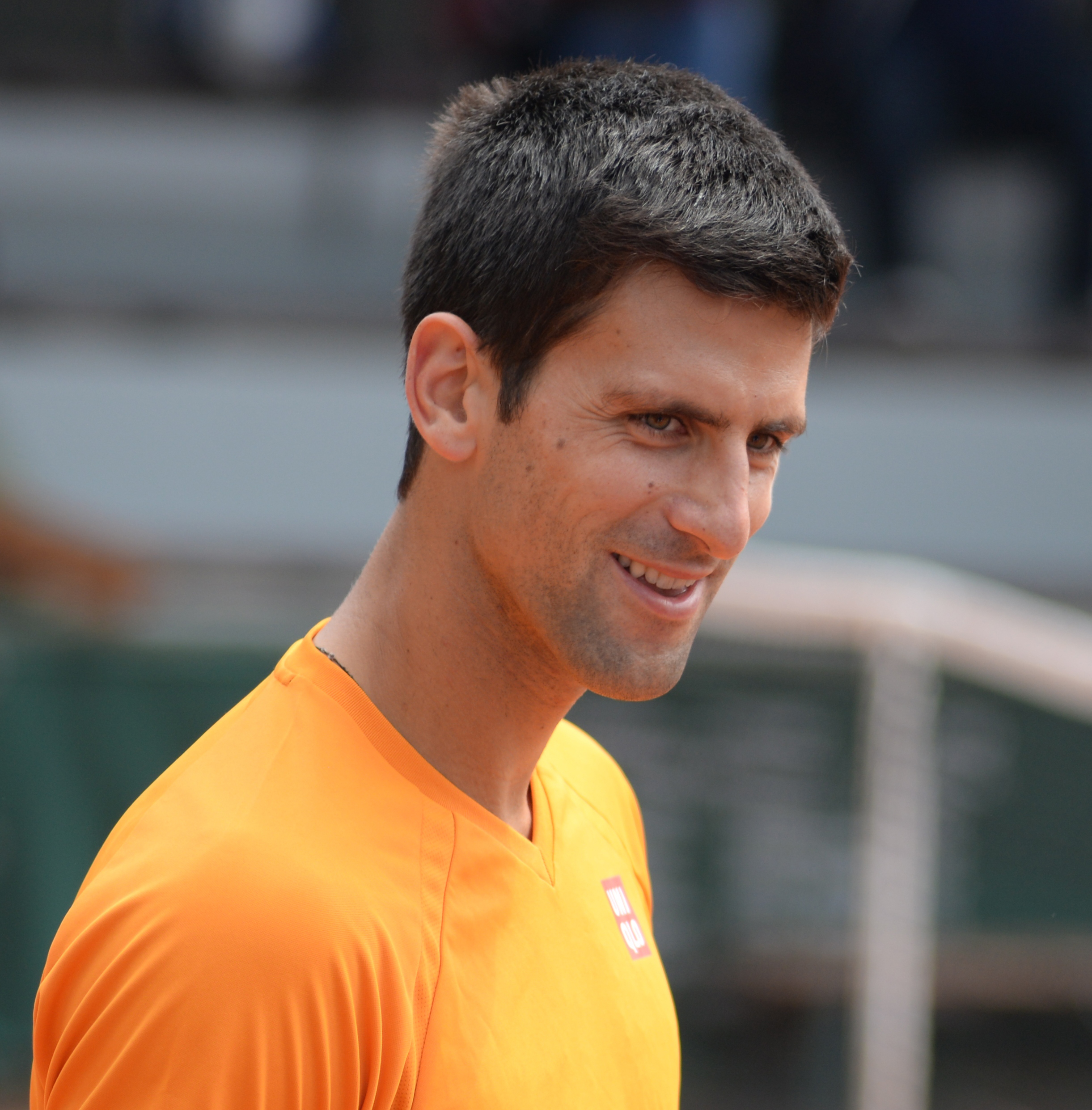
Novak Djokovic holds the record for most singles titles with four.

Year	Champions	Runners-up	Score
↓ ATP Tour Masters 1000 ↓
2009	(Russia) Nikolay Davydenko (1/1)	(Spain) Rafael Nadal	7–6^{(7–3)}, 6–3
2010	(United Kingdom) Andy Murray (1/3)	(Switzerland) Roger Federer	6–3, 6–2
2011	(United Kingdom) Andy Murray (2/3)	(Spain) David Ferrer	7–5, 6–4
2012	(Serbia) Novak Djokovic (1/4)	(United Kingdom) Andy Murray	5–7, 7–6^{(13–11)}, 6–3
2013	(Serbia) Novak Djokovic (2/4)	(Argentina) Juan Martín del Potro	6–1, 3–6, 7–6^{(7–3)}
2014	(Switzerland) Roger Federer (1/2)	(France) Gilles Simon	7–6^{(8–6)}, 7–6^{(7–2)}
2015	(Serbia) Novak Djokovic (3/4)	(France) Jo-Wilfried Tsonga	6–2, 6–4
2016	(United Kingdom) Andy Murray (3/3)	(Spain) Roberto Bautista Agut	7–6^{(7–1)}, 6–1
2017	(Switzerland) Roger Federer (2/2)	(Spain) Rafael Nadal	6–4, 6–3
2018	(Serbia) Novak Djokovic (4/4)	(Croatia) Borna Ćorić	6–3, 6–4
2019	(Russia) Daniil Medvedev (1/1)	(Germany) Alexander Zverev	6–4, 6–1
2020– 2022	No competition (due to COVID-19 pandemic)		
2023	(Poland) Hubert Hurkacz (1/1)	Andrey Rublev	6–3, 3–6, 7–6^{(10–8)}
2024	(Italy) Jannik Sinner (1/1)	(Serbia) Novak Djokovic	7–6^{(7–4)}, 6–3
2025	(Monaco) Valentin Vacherot (1/1)	(France) Arthur Rinderknech	4–6, 6–3, 6–3
2026	(Spain) Alejandro Davidovich Fokina (1/1)	(Spain) Rafael Jódar	1–6, 7–6^{(7–5)}, 6–4

=== Doubles ===
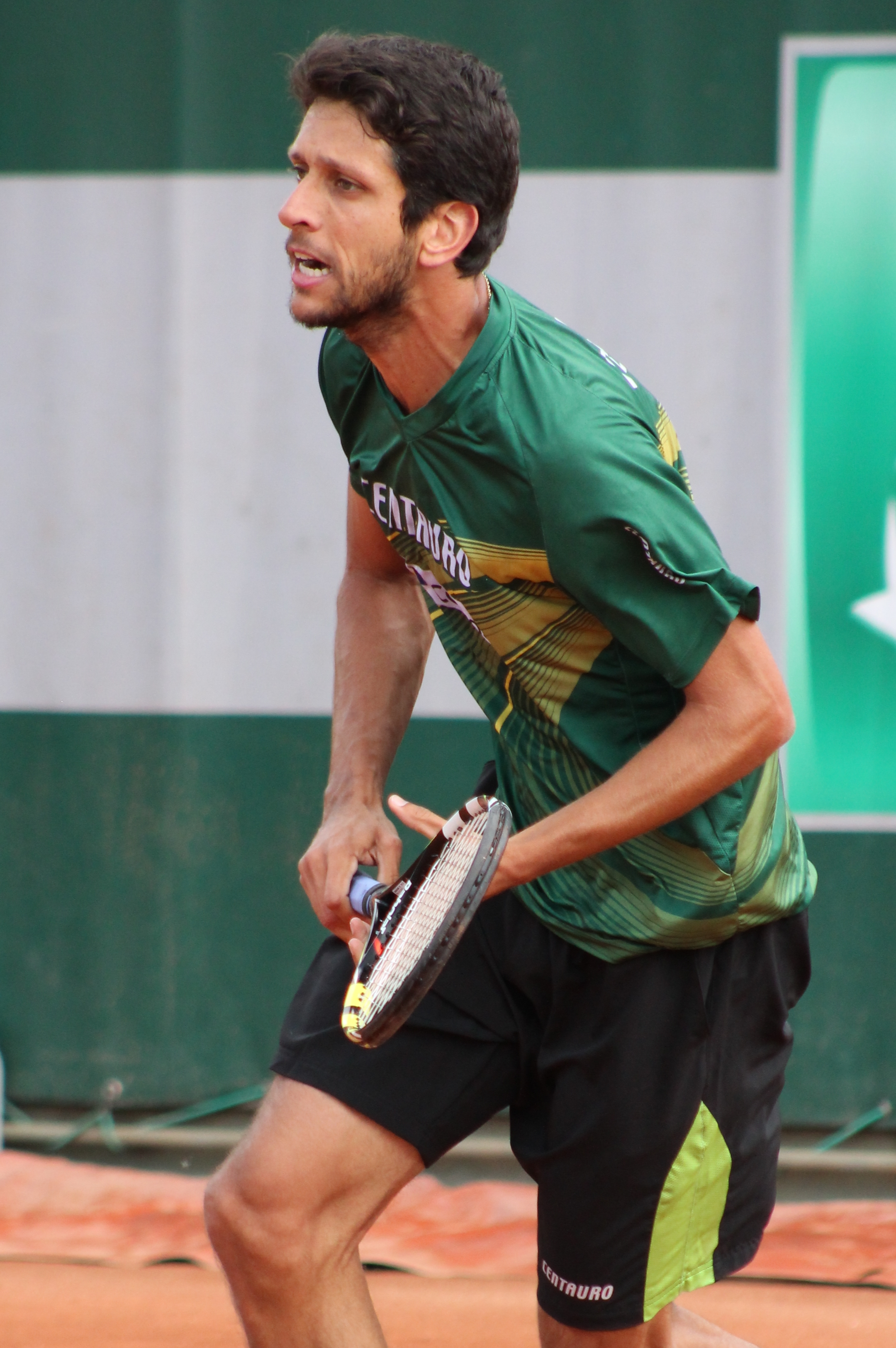
Marcelo Melo holds the record for most doubles titles with three.

Year	Champions	Runners-up	Score
↓ ATP Tour Masters 1000 ↓
2009	(France) Julien Benneteau (France) Jo-Wilfried Tsonga	(Poland) Mariusz Fyrstenberg (Poland) Marcin Matkowski	6–2, 6–4
2010	(Austria) Jürgen Melzer (India) Leander Paes	(Poland) Mariusz Fyrstenberg (Poland) Marcin Matkowski	7–5, 4–6, [10–5]
2011	(Belarus) Max Mirnyi (Canada) Daniel Nestor	(France) Michaël Llodra (Serbia) Nenad Zimonjić	3–6, 6–1, [12–10]
2012	(India) Leander Paes (2) (Czech Republic) Radek Štěpánek	(India) Mahesh Bhupathi (India) Rohan Bopanna	6–7^{(7–9)}, 6–3, [10–5]
2013	(Croatia) Ivan Dodig (Brazil) Marcelo Melo	(Spain) David Marrero (Spain) Fernando Verdasco	7–6^{(7–2)}, 6–7^{(6–8)}, [10–2]
2014	(United States) Bob Bryan (United States) Mike Bryan	(France) Julien Benneteau (France) Édouard Roger-Vasselin	6–3, 7–6^{(7–3)}
2015	(South Africa) Raven Klaasen (Brazil) Marcelo Melo (2)	(Italy) Simone Bolelli (Italy) Fabio Fognini	6–3, 6–3
2016	(United States) John Isner (United States) Jack Sock	(Finland) Henri Kontinen (Australia) John Peers	6–4, 6–4
2017	(Finland) Henri Kontinen (Australia) John Peers	(Poland) Łukasz Kubot (Brazil) Marcelo Melo	6–4, 6–2
2018	(Poland) Łukasz Kubot (Brazil) Marcelo Melo (3)	(United Kingdom) Jamie Murray (Brazil) Bruno Soares	6–4, 6–2
2019	(Croatia) Mate Pavić (Brazil) Bruno Soares	(Poland) Łukasz Kubot (Brazil) Marcelo Melo	6–4, 6–2
2020– 2022	No competition (due to COVID-19 pandemic)		
2023	(Spain) Marcel Granollers (Argentina) Horacio Zeballos	(India) Rohan Bopanna (Australia) Matthew Ebden	5–7, 6–2, [10–7]
2024	(Netherlands) Wesley Koolhof (Croatia) Nikola Mektić	(Argentina) Máximo González (Argentina) Andrés Molteni	6–4, 6–4
2025	(Germany) Kevin Krawietz (Germany) Tim Pütz	(Sweden) André Göransson (United States) Alex Michelsen	6–4, 6–4
2026	(Austria) Lucas Miedler (Austria) Neil Oberleitner	(Portugal) Francisco Cabral (United States) JJ Tracy	6–3, 6–4

== Records ==
Source: Ultimate Tennis Statistics

=== Singles ===
Most titles	(Serbia) Novak Djokovic	4
Most finals	(Serbia) Novak Djokovic	5
Most consecutive titles	(United Kingdom) Andy Murray (2010, 2011)	2
Most consecutive titles	(Serbia) Novak Djokovic (2012, 2013)	2
Most consecutive finals	(United Kingdom) Andy Murray (2010, 2011, 2012)	3
Most matches played	(Serbia) Novak Djokovic	51
Most matches won	(Serbia) Novak Djokovic	43
Best winning %	(Serbia) Novak Djokovic	84.31%
Most editions played	(Croatia) Marin Čilić	12
Most consecutive matches won	(United Kingdom) Andy Murray	17
Youngest champion	(Italy) Jannik Sinner	23y, 1m, 28d (2024)
Oldest champion	(Switzerland) Roger Federer	36y, 2m, 7d (2017)

Longest final

Longest singles final match by number of games
2012 (34 games)
(Serbia) Novak Djokovic	5	7^{13}	6
(United Kingdom) Andy Murray	7	6^{11}	3

Shortest finals

2010 (17 games)
(United Kingdom) Andy Murray	6	6
(Switzerland) Roger Federer	3	2

2019 (17 games)
(Russia) Daniil Medvedev	6	6
(Germany) Alexander Zverev	4	1

== Point and prize money distribution ==
=== Point distribution ===
Below are the tables with the point distribution for each phase of the tournament.

==== Senior points ====
Event	W	F	SF	QF	Round of 16	Round of 32	Round of 64	Round of 96	Q	Q3	Q2	Q1
Men's singles	1000	650	400	200	100	50	30	10	20	0	10	0
Men's doubles	1000	600	360	180	90	N/A						

=== Prize money ===
The Rolex Shanghai Masters in Shanghai, China, which this year runs 7–18 October, has announced a prize money total of US$9,415,725 for the 2026 edition. The singles champion will earn US$1,151,380, and the winning doubles team will split US$468,200:

Edition 2025	W	F	SF	QF	Round of 16	Round of 32	Round of 64	Round of 96	Qualifier	Q3	Q2	Q1
Singles	$1,151,380	$612,340	$340,190	$193,645	$105,720	$61,865	$36,110	$24,335	$0	$0	$14,130	$7,330
Doubles *	$468,200	$247,870	$133,110	$66,570	$35,700	$19,510	N/A					

Awards and achievements
Preceded by Miami	ATP World Tour Masters 1000 Tournament of the Year; 2009 – 2013	Succeeded by Indian Wells
