= 2019 Rolex Shanghai Masters – Singles =

Singles
- 2019 Rolex Shanghai Masters

Final
- Champion: (Russia) Daniil Medvedev
- Runner-up: (Germany) Alexander Zverev
- Score: 6–4, 6–1

Details
- Draw: 56 (7 Q / 4 WC )
- Seeds: 16

Events
Singles	Doubles
- Shanghai Masters

Daniil Medvedev defeated Alexander Zverev in the final, 6–4, 6–1 to win the singles tennis title at the 2019 Shanghai Masters. He did not drop a set en route to the title.

Novak Djokovic was the defending champion, but lost to Stefanos Tsitsipas in the quarterfinals.

This was the first time since the 1999 ATP German Open that all four semifinalists at a Masters event were under the age of 24.

This was the last appearance of Roger Federer at a Masters 1000 level tournament.

== Seeds ==
The top eight seeds receive a bye into the second round.

1. (Serbia) Novak Djokovic (quarterfinals)
2. (Switzerland) Roger Federer (quarterfinals)
3. (Russia) Daniil Medvedev (champion)
4. (Austria) Dominic Thiem (quarterfinals)
5. (Germany) Alexander Zverev (final)
6. (Greece) Stefanos Tsitsipas (semifinals)
7. (Russia) Karen Khachanov (third round)
8. (Spain) Roberto Bautista Agut (third round)

9. (France) Gaël Monfils (second round)
10. (Italy) Fabio Fognini (quarterfinals)
11. (Italy) Matteo Berrettini (semifinals)
12. (Croatia) Borna Ćorić (first round)
13. (Belgium) David Goffin (third round)
14. (Argentina) Diego Schwartzman (first round)
15. (Georgia (country)) Nikoloz Basilashvili (third round)
16. (United States) John Isner (third round)

Click on the seed number of a player to go to their draw section.

== Draw ==
Key

- Q = Qualifier
- WC = Wild card
- LL = Lucky loser
- Alt = Alternate
- ITF = ITF entry
- PR = Protected ranking
- SR = Special ranking
- SE = Special exempt
- JE = Junior exempt
- JR = Junior Accelerator Programme entrant
- CO = College Accelerator Programme entrant
- NG = Next Gen Accelerator Program entrant
- w/o = Walkover
- r = Retired
- d = Defaulted

=== Finals ===
Quarterfinals
1	(Serbia) Novak Djokovic	6	5	3
6	(Greece) Stefanos Tsitsipas	3	7	6
3	(Russia) Daniil Medvedev	6	7^{7}
10	(Italy) Fabio Fognini	3	6^{4}
11	(Italy) Matteo Berrettini	7^{10}	6
4	(Austria) Dominic Thiem	6^{8}	4
5	(Germany) Alexander Zverev	6	6^{7}	6
2	(Switzerland) Roger Federer	3	7^{9}	3

Semifinals
6	(Greece) Stefanos Tsitsipas	6^{5}	5
3	(Russia) Daniil Medvedev	7^{7}	7
11	(Italy) Matteo Berrettini	3	4
5	(Germany) Alexander Zverev	6	6

Final
3	(Russia) Daniil Medvedev	6	6
5	(Germany) Alexander Zverev	4	1

=== Top half ===
==== Section 1 ====
First round
(United States) F Tiafoe	4	2
(Canada) D Shapovalov	6	6
WC	(China) Z Li	7^{7}	4	4
(France) L Pouille	6^{4}	6	6
(Australia) A de Minaur	6^{1}	4
16	(United States) J Isner	7^{7}	6
9	(France) G Monfils	7	6^{1}	6
(Italy) L Sonego	5	7^{7}	3
(Poland) H Hurkacz	7^{7}	6
WC	(China) Zh Zhang	6^{5}	4
(Canada) F Auger-Aliassime	7^{7}	4
Q	(Kazakhstan) A Bublik	6^{5}	0^{r}

Second round
1	(Serbia) N Djokovic	6	6
(Canada) D Shapovalov	3	3
(France) L Pouille	5	3
16	(United States) J Isner	7	6
9	(France) G Monfils	2	6^{1}
(Poland) H Hurkacz	6	7^{7}
(Canada) F Auger-Aliassime	6^{3}	6^{3}
6	(Greece) S Tsitsipas	7^{7}	7^{7}

Third round
1	(Serbia) N Djokovic	7	6
16	(United States) J Isner	5	3
(Poland) H Hurkacz	5	6	6^{5}
6	(Greece) S Tsitsipas	7	3	7^{7}

Quarterfinals
1	(Serbia) N Djokovic	6	5	3
6	(Greece) S Tsitsipas	3	7	6

==== Section 2 ====
First round
Q	(United Kingdom) C Norrie	7	6
(France) G Simon	5	2
(Portugal) J Sousa	2	6	7^{7}
(Serbia) F Krajinović	6	4	6^{5}
Q	(Canada) V Pospisil	7^{7}	6
14	(Argentina) D Schwartzman	6^{2}	2
10	(Italy) F Fognini	6	6
(United States) S Querrey	4	2
WC	(United Kingdom) A Murray	2	6	6
Q	(Argentina) JI Londero	6	2	3
(Spain) F Verdasco	6^{2}	7^{7}	4
(United States) T Fritz	7^{7}	6^{5}	6

Second round
3	(Russia) D Medvedev	6	6
Q	(United Kingdom) C Norrie	3	1
(Portugal) J Sousa	3	5
Q	(Canada) V Pospisil	6	7
10	(Italy) F Fognini	7^{7}	2	7^{7}
WC	(United Kingdom) A Murray	6^{4}	6	6^{2}
(United States) T Fritz	2	4
7	(Russia) K Khachanov	6	6

Third round
3	(Russia) D Medvedev	7^{9}	7
Q	(Canada) V Pospisil	6^{7}	5
10	(Italy) F Fognini	6	7
7	(Russia) K Khachanov	3	5

Quarterfinals
3	(Russia) D Medvedev	6	7^{7}
10	(Italy) F Fognini	3	6^{4}

=== Bottom half ===
==== Section 3 ====
First round
(United States) R Opelka	6	6
(Serbia) D Lajović	3	4
(Uruguay) P Cuevas	1	4
(Chile) C Garín	6	6
(Germany) J-L Struff	2	1
11	(Italy) M Berrettini	6	6
15	(Georgia (country)) N Basilashvili	4	6	6
(Moldova) R Albot	6	1	3
Q	(Italy) M Cecchinato	2	5
(France) B Paire	6	7
WC	(China) Ze Zhang	3	6	4
Q	(Spain) P Carreño Busta	6	2	6

Second round
8	(Spain) R Bautista Agut	6	7
(United States) R Opelka	4	5
(Chile) C Garín	3	3
11	(Italy) M Berrettini	6	6
15	(Georgia (country)) N Basilashvili	6	1	6
(France) B Paire	4	6	1
Q	(Spain) P Carreño Busta	6^{3}	3
4	(Austria) D Thiem	7^{7}	6

Third round
8	(Spain) R Bautista Agut	6^{5}	4
11	(Italy) M Berrettini	7^{7}	6
15	(Georgia (country)) N Basilashvili	3	4
4	(Austria) D Thiem	6	6

Quarterfinals
11	(Italy) M Berrettini	7^{10}	6
4	(Austria) D Thiem	6^{8}	4

==== Section 4 ====
First round
Q	(France) J Chardy	6	7^{7}
(United Kingdom) K Edmund	4	6^{3}
(Argentina) G Pella	3	5
SE	(Australia) J Millman	6	7
(Russia) A Rublev	6	7^{7}
12	(Croatia) B Ćorić	4	6^{4}
13	(Belgium) D Goffin	6	6
(France) R Gasquet	2	3
(Kazakhstan) M Kukushkin	7^{7}	6
(Serbia) M Kecmanović	6^{4}	4
(Spain) A Ramos Viñolas	6	6
(Croatia) M Čilić	4	4

Second round
5	(Germany) A Zverev	7^{15}	7^{7}
Q	(France) J Chardy	6^{13}	6^{3}
SE	(Australia) J Millman	2	0
(Russia) A Rublev	6	6
13	(Belgium) D Goffin	6	3
(Kazakhstan) M Kukushkin	2	0^{r}
(Spain) A Ramos Viñolas	2	6^{5}
2	(Switzerland) R Federer	6	7^{7}

Third round
5	(Germany) A Zverev	6	7^{7}
(Russia) A Rublev	0	6^{4}
13	(Belgium) D Goffin	6^{7}	4
2	(Switzerland) R Federer	7^{9}	6

Quarterfinals
5	(Germany) A Zverev	6	6^{7}	6
2	(Switzerland) R Federer	3	7^{9}	3

== Qualifying ==
=== Seeds ===
1. (Spain) Pablo Carreño Busta (qualified)
2. (France) Adrian Mannarino (first round)
3. (United Kingdom) Dan Evans (qualifying competition)
4. (Kazakhstan) Alexander Bublik (qualified)
5. (Argentina) Juan Ignacio Londero (qualified)
6. (Italy) Marco Cecchinato (qualified)
7. (United Kingdom) Cameron Norrie (qualified)
8. (France) Jérémy Chardy (qualified)
9. (Chile) Nicolás Jarry (first round)
10. (Japan) Yoshihito Nishioka (qualifying competition)
11. (Germany) Dominik Koepfer (qualifying competition)
12. (Italy) Thomas Fabbiano (qualifying competition)
13. (Bosnia and Herzegovina) Damir Džumhur (qualifying competition)
14. (Australia) Alexei Popyrin (first round)

=== Qualifiers ===
1. (Spain) Pablo Carreño Busta
2. (Canada) Vasek Pospisil
3. (France) Jérémy Chardy
4. (Kazakhstan) Alexander Bublik
5. (Argentina) Juan Ignacio Londero
6. (Italy) Marco Cecchinato
7. (United Kingdom) Cameron Norrie

=== Qualifying draw ===
==== First qualifier ====
First round
1	(Spain) Pablo Carreño Busta	7^{7}	7^{7}
WC	(China) Wu Di	6^{3}	6^{5}
WC	(China) He Yecong	5	4
11	(Germany) Dominik Koepfer	7	6

Qualifying competition
1	(Spain) Pablo Carreño Busta	6	6
11	(Germany) Dominik Koepfer	3	1

==== Second qualifier ====
First round
2	(France) Adrian Mannarino	5	1
PR	(Canada) Vasek Pospisil	7	6
(Spain) Marcel Granollers	6	6
14	(Australia) Alexei Popyrin	4	4

Qualifying competition
PR	(Canada) Vasek Pospisil	7	7^{7}
(Spain) Marcel Granollers	5	6^{2}

==== Third qualifier ====
First round
3	(United Kingdom) Dan Evans	6	3	6
(Australia) Bernard Tomic	2	6	0
(Russia) Aslan Karatsev	4	0
8	(France) Jérémy Chardy	6	6

Qualifying competition
3	(United Kingdom) Dan Evans	6	4	4
8	(France) Jérémy Chardy	2	6	6

==== Fourth qualifier ====
First round
4	(Kazakhstan) Alexander Bublik	6	6
(Portugal) Gonçalo Oliveira	4	4
(Germany) Peter Gojowczyk	3	6	3
10	(Japan) Yoshihito Nishioka	6	2	6

Qualifying competition
4	(Kazakhstan) Alexander Bublik	6	6
10	(Japan) Yoshihito Nishioka	3	2

==== Fifth qualifier ====
First round
5	(Argentina) Juan Ignacio Londero	6	7^{7}
(Serbia) Viktor Troicki	4	6^{4}
(United States) Bradley Klahn	7^{7}	3	7
9	(Chile) Nicolás Jarry	6^{4}	6	5

Qualifying competition
5	(Argentina) Juan Ignacio Londero	6	7^{10}
(United States) Bradley Klahn	4	6^{8}

==== Sixth qualifier ====
First round
6	(Italy) Marco Cecchinato	6	6^{7}	6
WC	(China) Sun Fajing	3	7^{9}	2
(Japan) Tatsuma Ito	6	6^{2}	2
13	(Bosnia and Herzegovina) Damir Džumhur	4	7^{7}	6

Qualifying competition
6	(Italy) Marco Cecchinato	7	6
13	(Bosnia and Herzegovina) Damir Džumhur	5	3

==== Seventh qualifier ====
First round
7	(United Kingdom) Cameron Norrie	6	6
(Canada) Brayden Schnur	3	3
WC	(China) Hua Runhao	6	0	6^{2}
12	(Italy) Thomas Fabbiano	3	6	7^{7}

Qualifying competition
7	(United Kingdom) Cameron Norrie	6	6
12	(Italy) Thomas Fabbiano	4	4
