= 2018 Shanghai Rolex Masters – Doubles =

Doubles
- 2018 Shanghai Rolex Masters

Final
- Champions: (Poland) Łukasz Kubot (Brazil) Marcelo Melo
- Runners-up: (United Kingdom) Jamie Murray (Brazil) Bruno Soares
- Score: 6–4, 6–2

Events
Singles	Doubles
- Shanghai Masters

Henri Kontinen and John Peers were the defending champions, but lost in the second round to Robert Lindstedt and Dominic Thiem.

Łukasz Kubot and Marcelo Melo won the title, defeating Jamie Murray and Bruno Soares in the final, 6–4, 6–2.

== Seeds ==
All seeds received a bye into the second round.

1. (United States) Mike Bryan / (United States) Jack Sock (second round)
2. (Austria) Oliver Marach / (Croatia) Mate Pavić (semifinals)
3. (Poland) Łukasz Kubot / (Brazil) Marcelo Melo (champions)
4. (Finland) Henri Kontinen / (Australia) John Peers (second round)
5. (Colombia) Juan Sebastián Cabal / (Colombia) Robert Farah (semifinals)
6. (United Kingdom) Jamie Murray / (Brazil) Bruno Soares (final)
7. (South Africa) Raven Klaasen / (New Zealand) Michael Venus (quarterfinals)
8. (Croatia) Ivan Dodig / (Croatia) Nikola Mektić (quarterfinals)

== Draw ==
Key

- Q = Qualifier
- WC = Wild card
- LL = Lucky loser
- Alt = Alternate
- ITF = ITF entry
- PR = Protected ranking
- SR = Special ranking
- SE = Special exempt
- JE = Junior exempt
- JR = Junior Accelerator Programme entrant
- CO = College Accelerator Programme entrant
- NG = Next Gen Accelerator Program entrant
- w/o = Walkover
- r = Retired
- d = Defaulted

=== Finals ===
Semifinals
5	(Colombia) Juan Sebastián Cabal (Colombia) Robert Farah	3	4
6	(United Kingdom) Jamie Murray (Brazil) Bruno Soares	6	6
3	(Poland) Łukasz Kubot (Brazil) Marcelo Melo	6	7
2	(Austria) Oliver Marach (Croatia) Mate Pavić	2	5

Final
6	(United Kingdom) Jamie Murray (Brazil) Bruno Soares	4	2
3	(Poland) Łukasz Kubot (Brazil) Marcelo Melo	6	6

=== Top half ===
First round
(Italy) M Cecchinato (Italy) A Seppi	3	7^{10}	[4]
(Chile) J Peralta (Argentina) H Zeballos	6	6^{8}	[10]
(Netherlands) J-J Rojer (Romania) H Tecău	6^{5}	7^{7}	[12]
(Pakistan) A-u-H Qureshi (Greece) S Tsitsipas	7^{7}	6^{2}	[10]
(Sweden) R Lindstedt (Austria) D Thiem	6	7^{8}
(Australia) A de Minaur (Australia) J Millman	4	6^{6}
WC	(China) Z Li (China) D Wu	3	1
(Argentina) M González (Argentina) D Schwartzman	6	6

Second round
1	(United States) M Bryan (United States) J Sock	6^{5}	6	[8]
(Chile) J Peralta (Argentina) H Zeballos	7^{7}	4	[10]
(Netherlands) J-J Rojer (Romania) H Tecău	4	7^{7}	[9]
5	(Colombia) JS Cabal (Colombia) R Farah	6	6^{5}	[11]
4	(Finland) H Kontinen (Australia) J Peers	4	6	[9]
(Sweden) R Lindstedt (Austria) D Thiem	6	4	[11]
(Argentina) M González (Argentina) D Schwartzman	3	4
6	(United Kingdom) J Murray (Brazil) B Soares	6	6

Quarterfinals
(Chile) J Peralta (Argentina) H Zeballos	2	4
5	(Colombia) JS Cabal (Colombia) R Farah	6	6
(Sweden) R Lindstedt (Austria) D Thiem	3	4
6	(United Kingdom) J Murray (Brazil) B Soares	6	6

Semifinals
5	(Colombia) JS Cabal (Colombia) R Farah	3	4
6	(United Kingdom) J Murray (Brazil) B Soares	6	6

=== Bottom half ===
First round
(India) R Bopanna (France) É Roger-Vasselin	6^{4}	3
(Japan) B McLachlan (Germany) J-L Struff	7^{7}	6
WC	(China) M Gong (China) Ze Zhang	3	4
(India) D Sharan (New Zealand) A Sitak	6	6
(France) A Mannarino (France) G Monfils	7	4	[10]
(Netherlands) R Haase (Netherlands) M Middelkoop	5	6	[6]
(United Kingdom) D Inglot (Croatia) F Škugor	6	6
(South Korea) H Chung (Australia) M Ebden	2	4

Second round
7	(South Africa) R Klaasen (New Zealand) M Venus	6	6
(Japan) B McLachlan (Germany) J-L Struff	3	3
(India) D Sharan (New Zealand) A Sitak	3	4
3	(Poland) Ł Kubot (Brazil) M Melo	6	6
8	(Croatia) I Dodig (Croatia) N Mektić	6	6
(France) A Mannarino (France) G Monfils	4	4
(United Kingdom) D Inglot (Croatia) F Škugor	3	7^{7}	[14]
2	(Austria) O Marach (Croatia) M Pavić	6	6^{4}	[16]

Quarterfinals
7	(South Africa) R Klaasen (New Zealand) M Venus	6^{3}	6	[7]
3	(Poland) Ł Kubot (Brazil) M Melo	7^{7}	4	[10]
8	(Croatia) I Dodig (Croatia) N Mektić	6	2	[6]
2	(Austria) O Marach (Croatia) M Pavić	3	6	[10]

Semifinals
3	(Poland) Ł Kubot (Brazil) M Melo	6	7
2	(Austria) O Marach (Croatia) M Pavić	2	5
