= Chinese Tennis Association =

Tennis organization in the People's Republic of China

- Sport: Tennis
- Abbreviation: (CTA)
- Founded: 1953
- Location: Beijing
- President: Lü Zhengcao
- Secretary: Liu Wenbin

Official website
- www.tennis.org.cn
- (China)

The Chinese Tennis Association (CTA; 中国网球协会) is the national governing body of tennis in China. It is a cooperative member of the All-China Sports Federation. The CTA is an independent legal person and it is recognized by China's Olympic Committee. The CTA is the only legal organization that represents China in world tennis organizations, including the International Tennis Federation and Asian Tennis Federation.

== History ==
The CTA was founded in 1953. Its highest organ of power is the CTA National Congress, and the secretariat is in charge of the administration work. The mission is to develop Chinese male and female top tennis players within the next 15 years.

== Committees ==
There are nine special committees under the CTA.

- Coaches Commission
- Referees/Judges Commission
- Junior and Youth Development Commission
- Scientific Research Commission
- Press and Publicity Commission
- Marketing, Management & Development Commission
- Professionalization and Specialization Commission
- Amateur Activities Commission
- Disciplines & Arbitration Commission

== Headquarters ==
The headquarters of CTA is in the Chinese capital Beijing.

== See also ==
- Tennis in China
- Sports in China
