= Shanghai New International Expo Center =

Convention center in Pudong, Shanghai, China

Coordinates: 31°12′40″N 121°33′47″E

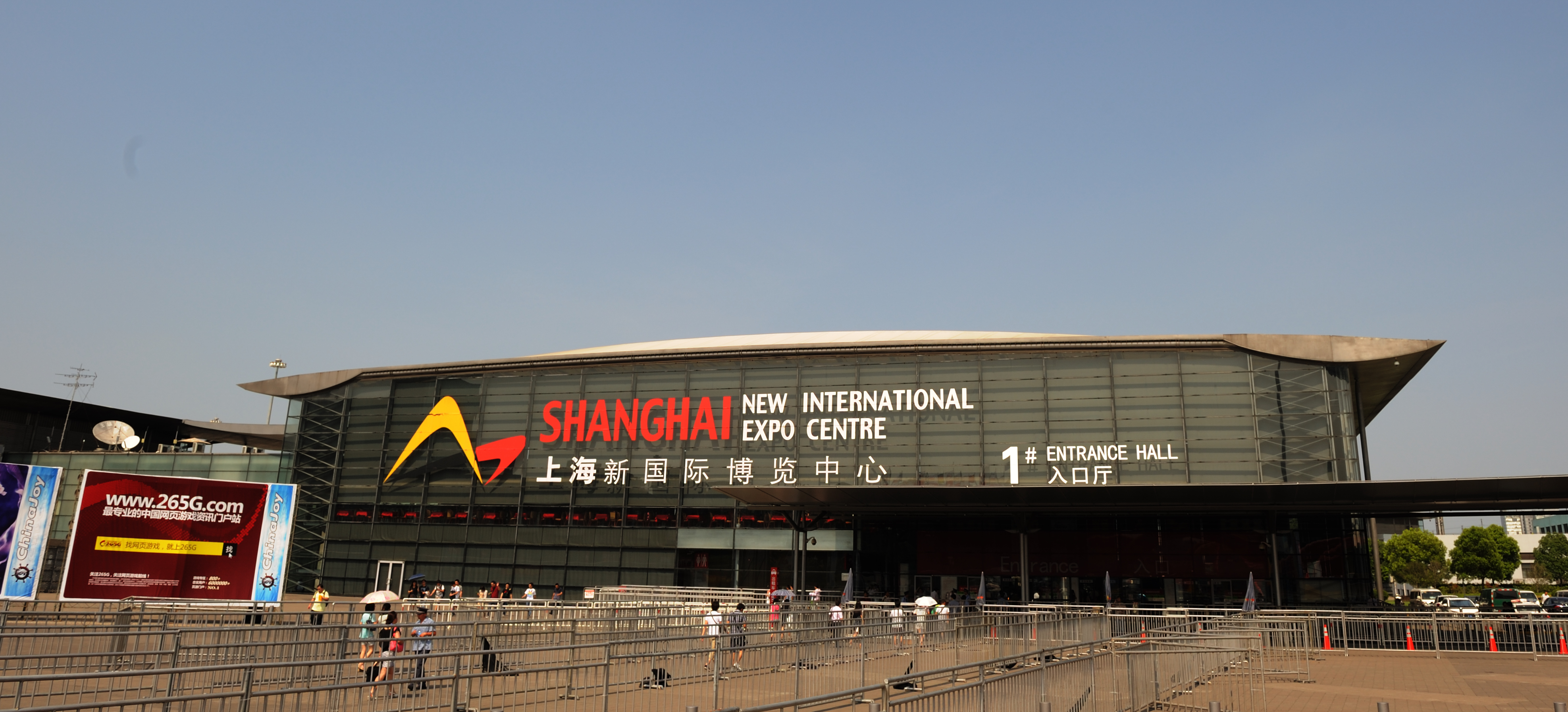
the entrance of Shanghai new international expo center

The Shanghai New International Expo Center is an exhibition center in Pudong, Shanghai. It hosts many exhibitions, including the Shanghai Motor Show. It has also hosted the 2002 Tennis Masters Cup, where one of the halls was temporarily converted into a tennis court. With more than 100 exhibitions per year and a turnover rate of 27 (2015), SNIEC is one of the world's most successful exhibition venues.

Construction started on November 4, 1999, with its opening taking place on November 2, 2001. It has, as of 2012, a capacity of 200,000 square meters indoor and 100,000 square meters outdoor exhibition area. Expo Center facilities include 17 exhibition halls, conference rooms, and a business center. Hotel facilities and a subway station are located at one of the entrance halls of the center. Total investment until 2011 was 591 million U.S. dollars.

Shanghai New International Expo Center Co., Ltd. is a Sino-German 50:50 joint venture of Shanghai Lujiazui Exhibition Development Co., Ltd. and the German Exposition Corporation International GmbH (GEC). GEC is a joint venture of Deutsche Messe AG, Messe Düsseldorf GmbH and Messe Munich GmbH. Since 2014, the German Michael Kruppe is general manager of the company.

The United States design firm Murphy/Jahn Architects designed the center.

== Transportation ==
Expo Center, including the 3 entrance halls and 17 halls (W1-W5, E1-E7, N1-N5), and the south Subway Station Connections.

=== Rail Transit ===
Shanghai Metro Huamu Road station, Longyang Road station

=== Surface Bus ===
Longyang Road Fangdian Road stop, Luoshan Road Huamu Road stop, Fangdian Road Meihua Road stop

== Covid-19 quarantine center ==
Since 29 March 2022, it has been transformed into a quarantine center to support the new wave of the COVID-19 pandemic happening in Shanghai, along Shanghai World Expo Exhibition & Convention Centre.
