= Qizhong Forest Sports City Arena =

Tennis venue in Shanghai, China

- Qizhong Forest Sports City Tennis Center; Qizhong Stadium
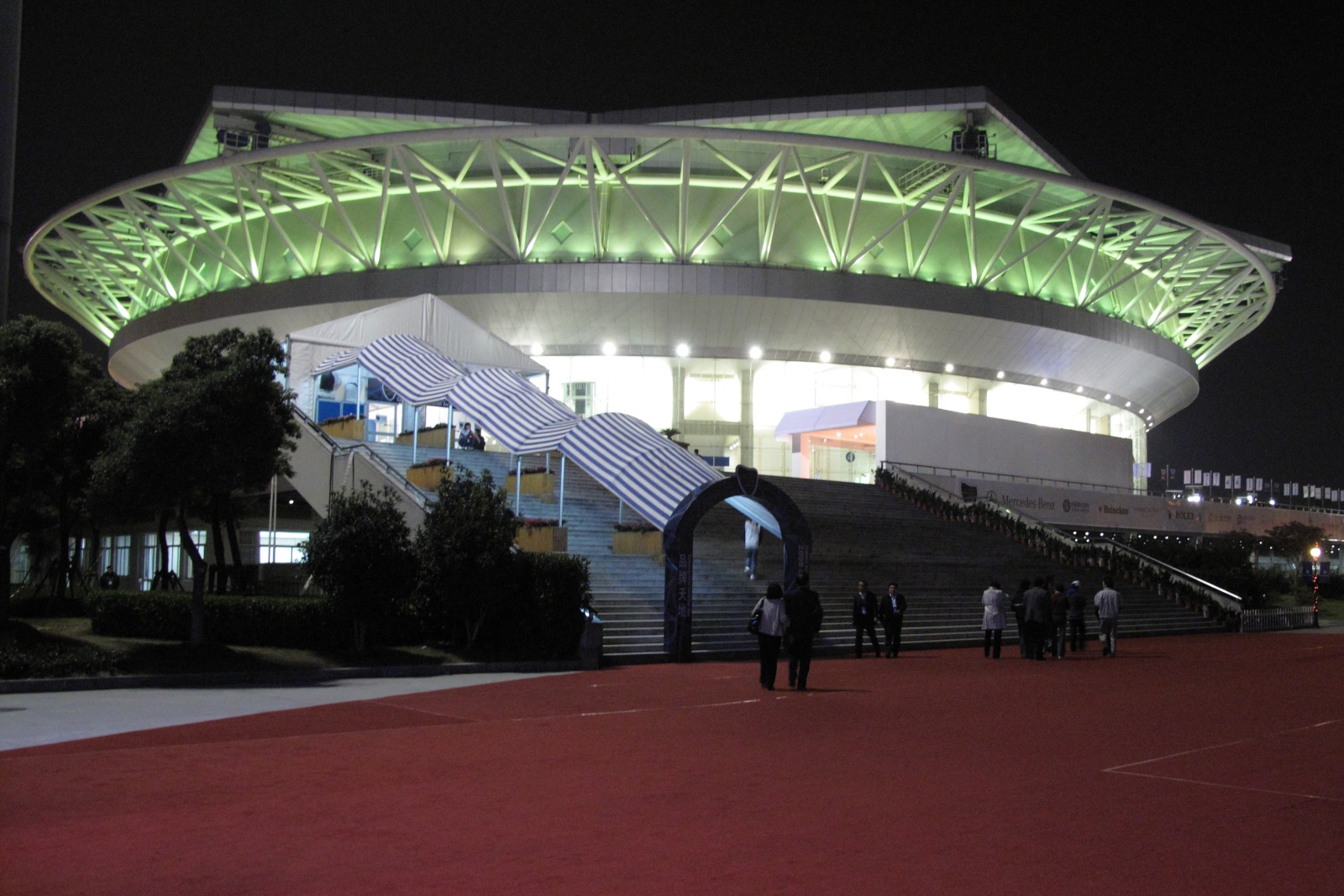
- Interactive map of Qizhong Forest Sports City Arena
- Location: Shanghai, China
- Coordinates: 31.042088°N 121.355522°E
- Owner: Chinese Tennis Association
- Capacity: 13,779 people

Construction
- Built: 2003
- Opened: October 5, 2005
- Cost: RMB2.4 billion USD251 million
- Architects: Mitsuru Senda; Environment Design Institute (EDI)
- Structural engineers: Jiangnan Heavy Industry Co., Ltd.; Shanghai Mechanical Construction Co., Ltd.
- General contractor: China Construction Third Bureau

Tenants
- Tennis Masters Cup (tennis) (2005–2008); Shanghai Masters (tennis) (2009–present); FINA World (Swimming) (April 2006)

The Qizhong Forest Sports City Arena (上海旗忠森林体育城网球中心), also known as Qizhong Stadium, is a tennis arena in Shanghai, People's Republic of China. The complex is located on an 80-hectare (200-acre) area, in Maqiao Town, in the southwest of Shanghai, Minhang District. It has a steel retractable roof which opens and closes in a pinwheel or spiral manner, with eight sliding petal-shaped pieces (moved in 8 minutes) resembling a blooming magnolia (Shanghai's official city flower). The roof enables the stadium to host both indoor and outdoor tennis events. The seating capacity is 13,779 people.

The stadium was specially created to host the ATP World Tour Finals between 2005 and 2008, and was the largest tennis venue in Asia, until the construction of the Olympic Green Tennis Centre in Beijing. Since 2009 it has hosted the Shanghai Masters, an ATP Tour Masters 1000 tournament which began that year. It also served as one of the venues used for the NBA's Cleveland Cavaliers and Orlando Magic during their tour of China in 2007.

== Stadium features ==
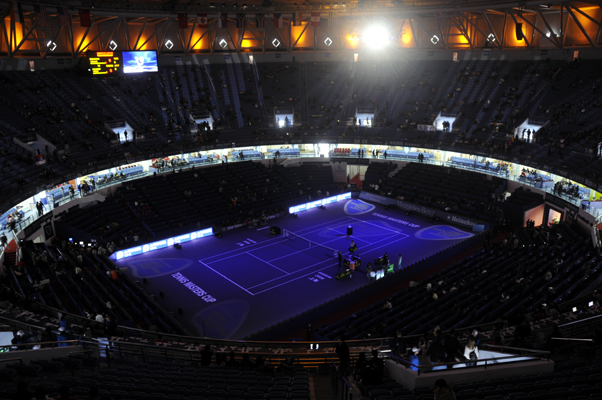
The Qi Zhong Stadium, playing host to a match at the 2008 Tennis Masters Cup

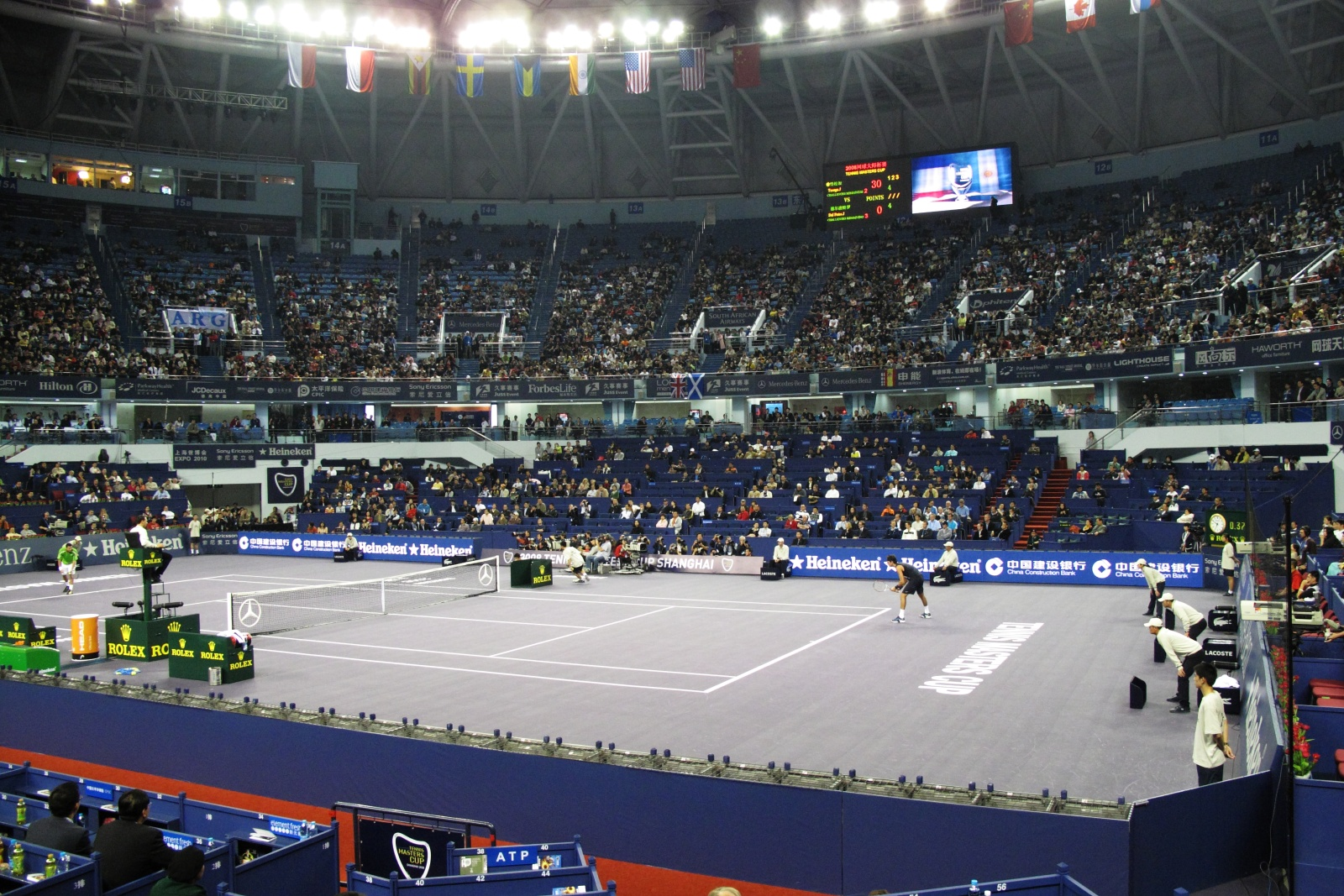
The Qizhong Arena main court, during the 2008 Tennis Masters Cup

The Tennis Centre covers a total area of 338,836 square meters, of which 85,000 square meters are made up of structures. The volume rate is 0.187, the building density 15.1%, green/open space 46.1%, with parking capacity of 993 parking spaces. The facility has 25 courts, including three main courts, namely center court, grand stand court 2, and court 3.

The center court stadium spans 30,649 square meters. It has four floors, for a total height of 40 m (131-ft) above ground level. The center court is covered by a steel roof with eight petal-shaped pieces (each petal weighs two tons) which resemble a magnolia, Shanghai's city flower. The opening of the roof represents the blooming of a magnolia flower. The roof takes eight minutes to completely open or close. The stadium can be adapted for other international events such as basketball (as in 2007), volleyball, table tennis, or gymnastics.

During the ATP World Tour Finals event, there was a retail zone, with the public eating/drinking areas outside the stadium.

== History ==
The stadium is located in Ma Qiao Town in southwest Shanghai, the Minhang District. The Shanghai Municipal Commission of Construction and Administration requested international bids in 2003, for building the stadium.

The winning bid was submitted by Japanese architect Mitsuru Senda and his company Environment Design Institute (EDI), an architectural and landscape firm specializing in children's environments including schools, museums, hospitals, sports facilities, parks, play structures, daycare centers, and housing.

EDI had designed sports stadiums in Japan, including the Tokyo Tatsumi International Swimming Center and the Tokoname Municipal Gymnasium. Mr. Senda, a former President and now honorary member of the Architectural Institute of Japan, established EDI in 1968 with a design philosophy to adapt comprehensive planning along with the layout of the environment.

Each leaf, of the roof, was constructed on the ground beforehand. The method of testing each leaf on the ground was similar to that used by China Aerospace, where each roof piece must pass a test, before it can be elevated to its position for final installation.

Other companies involved in the center's construction include:

- China Construction Third Bureau – construction contractor
- Jiangnan Heavy Industry Co., Ltd. – steel infrastructure
- Shanghai Mechanical Construction Co., Ltd. – roof construction

Currently, tennis park around the Centre Court Stadium is expanding. There will be a total of 40 tennis courts when Phase 2 is completed (Centre Court Stadium, 3 small indoor stadiums, 14 indoor courts and 22 outdoor courts).

== Gallery ==
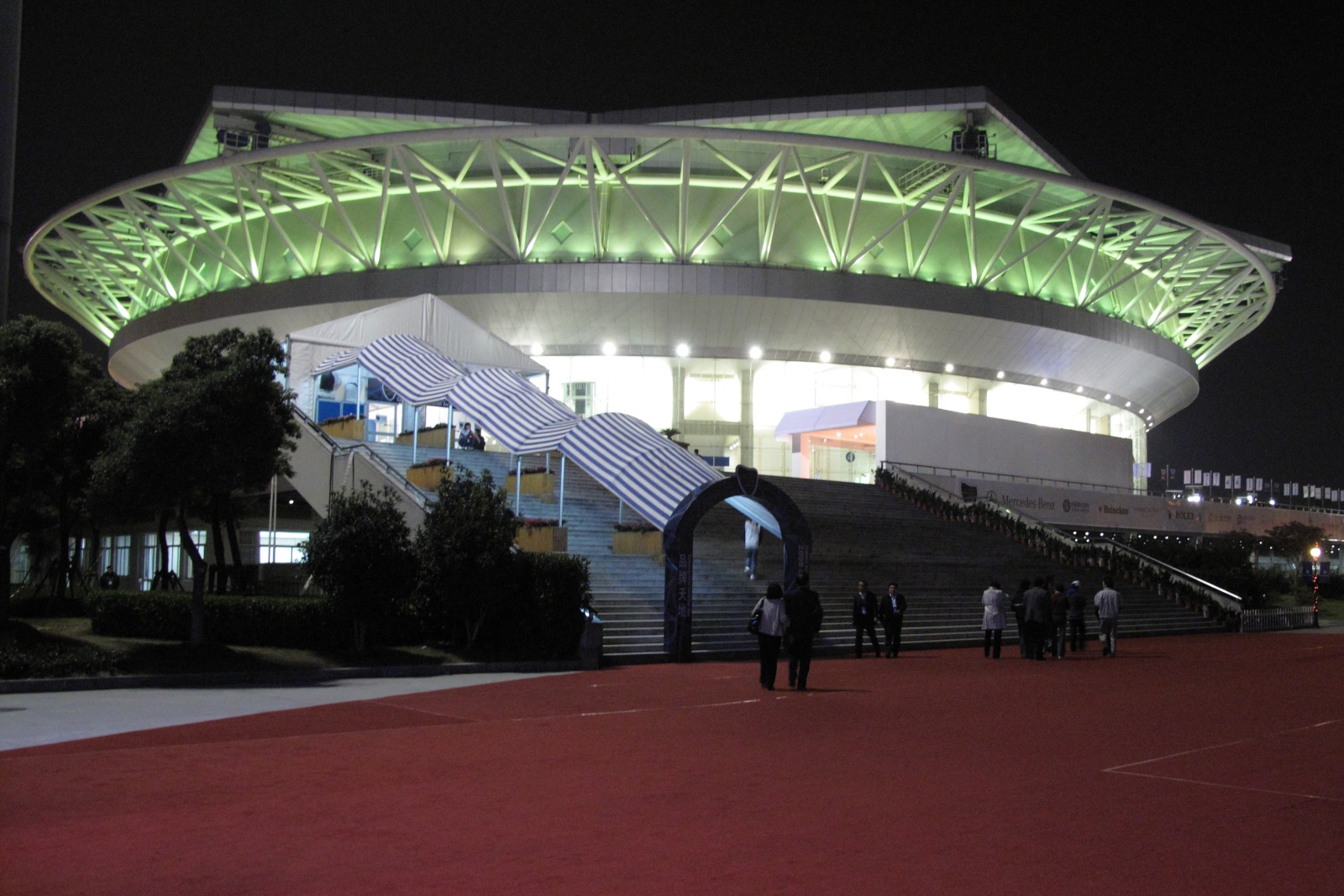

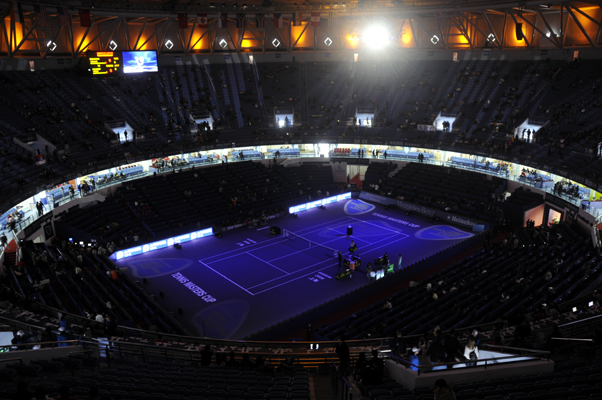

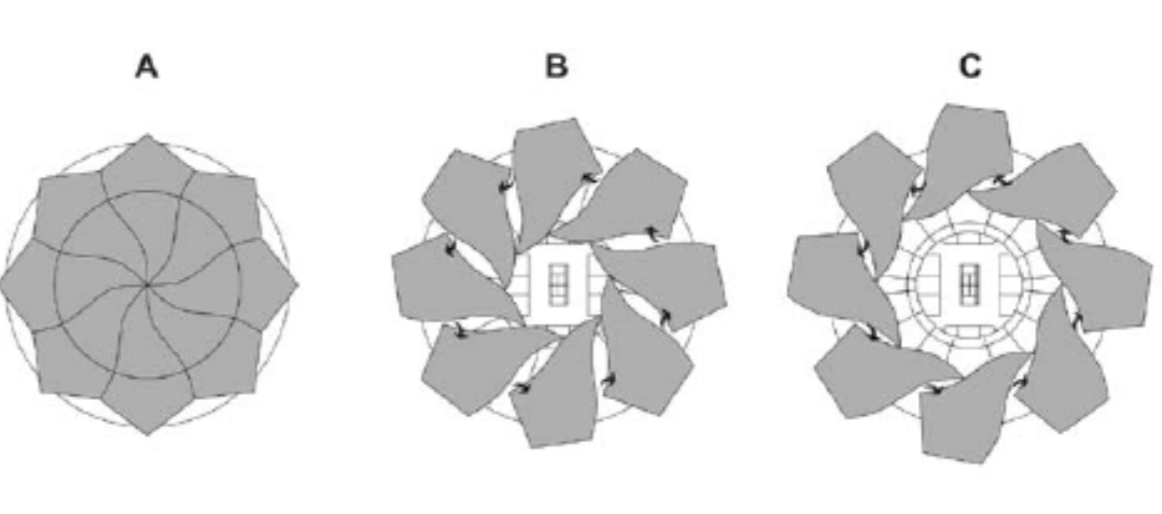

== See also ==
- Tennis in China
- List of tennis stadiums by capacity
- List of indoor arenas in China
- Lists of stadiums

Preceded by Westside Tennis Club; Houston	ATP Year-end Championships; Venue; 2005–2008	Succeeded by The O_{2} arena London
