= 2009 ATP World Tour Finals =

- Date: 22–29 November
- Edition: 40th (singles) / 35th (doubles)
- Category: World Tour Finals
- Draw: 8S / 8D
- Prize money: $5,000,000
- Surface: Hard / indoor
- Location: London, UK
- Venue: O_{2} arena

Champions

Singles
- (Russia) Nikolay Davydenko

Doubles
- (United States) Bob Bryan / (United States) Mike Bryan
- ATP World Tour Finals

The 2009 ATP World Tour Finals (also known as the 2009 Barclays ATP World Tour Finals for sponsorship reasons) was held in London, United Kingdom between 22 November and 29 November 2009. It was the first time the O_{2} arena hosted the ATP World Tour Year-End Singles and Doubles Championships. The event was renamed from Tennis Masters Cup to ATP World Tour Finals following the rearrangement of the ATP Tour.

== Finals ==
=== Singles ===
(Russia) Nikolay Davydenko defeated (Argentina) Juan Martín del Potro, 6–3, 6–4

- It was Davydenko's 5th title of the year and 19th of his career.

=== Doubles ===
(United States) Bob Bryan / (United States) Mike Bryan defeated (Belarus) Max Mirnyi / (Israel) Andy Ram, 7–6^{(7–5)}, 6–3

== Qualification ==
Spots were awarded to the top seven players highest ranked single players in the world ranking and the top seven doubles teams in the 2009 ATP Doubles Race, with one spot reserved for Grand Slam champions who finish outside of the top 8, but within the Top 20 players or teams. As this did not happen, the final spot went to the next player or team in the top 8. Two additional players and teams were also in London as alternates in case of withdrawals.

=== Singles qualification ===
Sd	Player	Points	Tour	Date Qualified
1	(Switzerland) Roger Federer	10150	15	5 July 2009
2	(Spain) Rafael Nadal	9205	17	19 May 2009
3	(Serbia) Novak Djokovic	7910	22	10 September 2009
4	(United Kingdom) Andy Murray	6630	18	20 August 2009
5	(Argentina) Juan Martín del Potro	5985	21	15 September 2009
inj	(United States) Andy Roddick	4410	20	20 October 2009
6	(Russia) Nikolay Davydenko	3630	25	12 November 2009
7	(Spain) Fernando Verdasco	3300	23	13 November 2009
8	(Sweden) Robin Söderling	3000	25	17 November 2009

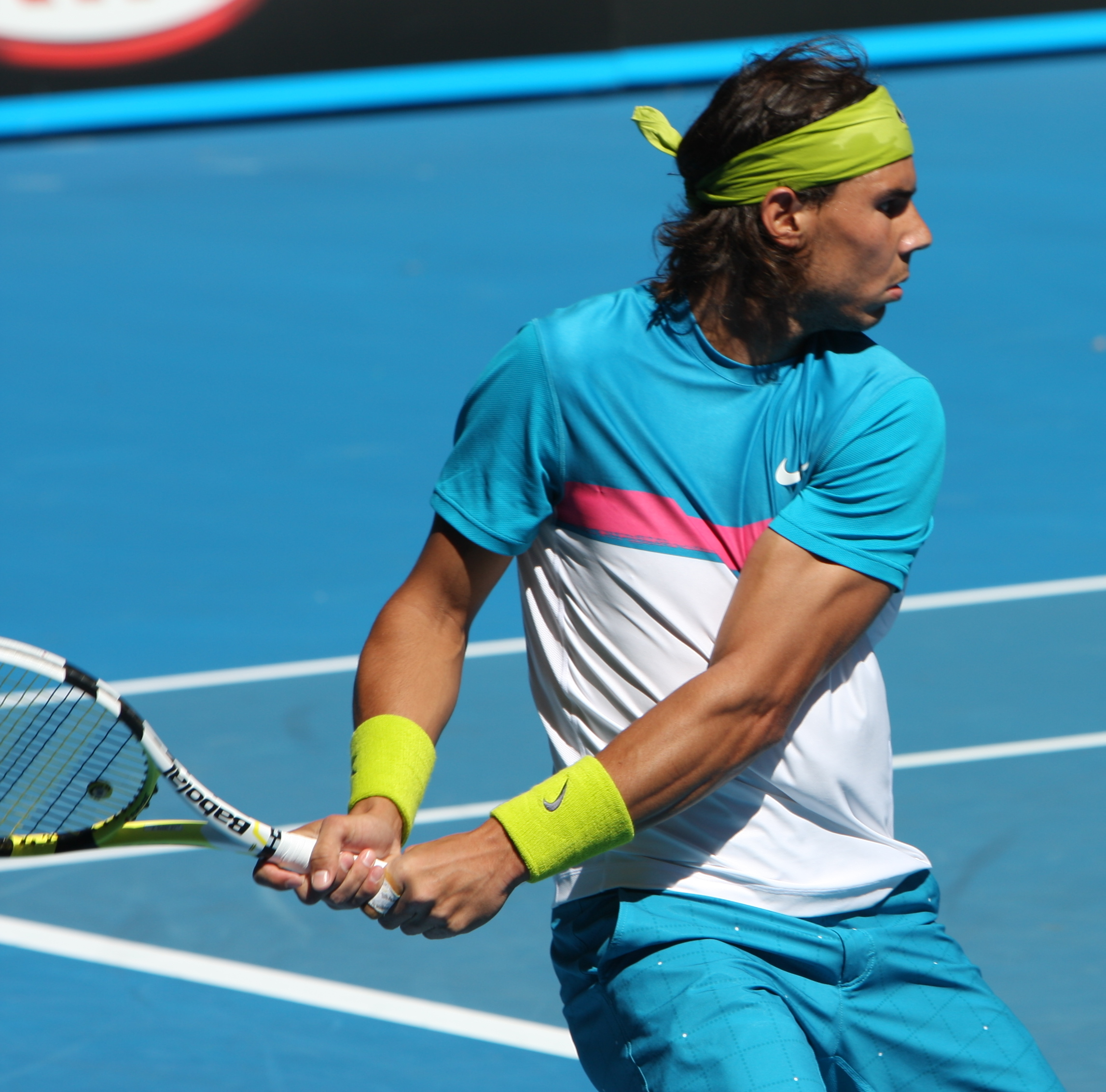
Rafael Nadal won his first hardcourt Slam at the 2009 Australian Open

On 19 May 2009 after reaching his 7th final of the year at the 2009 Mutua Madrileña Madrid Open, 2009 Australian Open champion Rafael Nadal of Spain was announced as the first qualifier.

Rafael Nadal began the year by winning his first Grand Slam on hardcourt at the Australian Open, defeating Roger Federer in the final 7–5, 3–6, 7–6, 3–6, 6–2, just after defeating Fernando Verdasco in a tournament record 5 hours 14 minutes battle in five sets. Following his Australian Open triumph he reached the final of the ABN AMRO World Tennis Tournament losing to Andy Murray. He then revenged his loss by defeating Murray in the final of BNP Paribas Open. He then won three straight titles at the Monte-Carlo Rolex Masters, the Internazionali BNL d'Italia and at the Barcelona Open Banco Sabadell. He then lost in his fourth straight final in the Mutua Madrileña Madrid Open to Federer. He was the four-time defending champion at Roland Garros and had a 31-match winning streak in Paris, broken with a surprise fourth round loss to No. 23-seeded Robin Söderling. He then missed Wimbledon becoming the first player since Ivanišević to not defend his title, and lost his no. 1 ranking to Federer. He then returned at the Rogers Masters but he did not reach a final until the Shanghai ATP Masters 1000 losing to Nikolay Davydenko. He also reached the semifinals of the US Open and the Western & Southern Financial Group Masters. Nadal has a 4–4 record at the championship and reached the semifinals in 2006 and 2007. This is his 3rd appearance

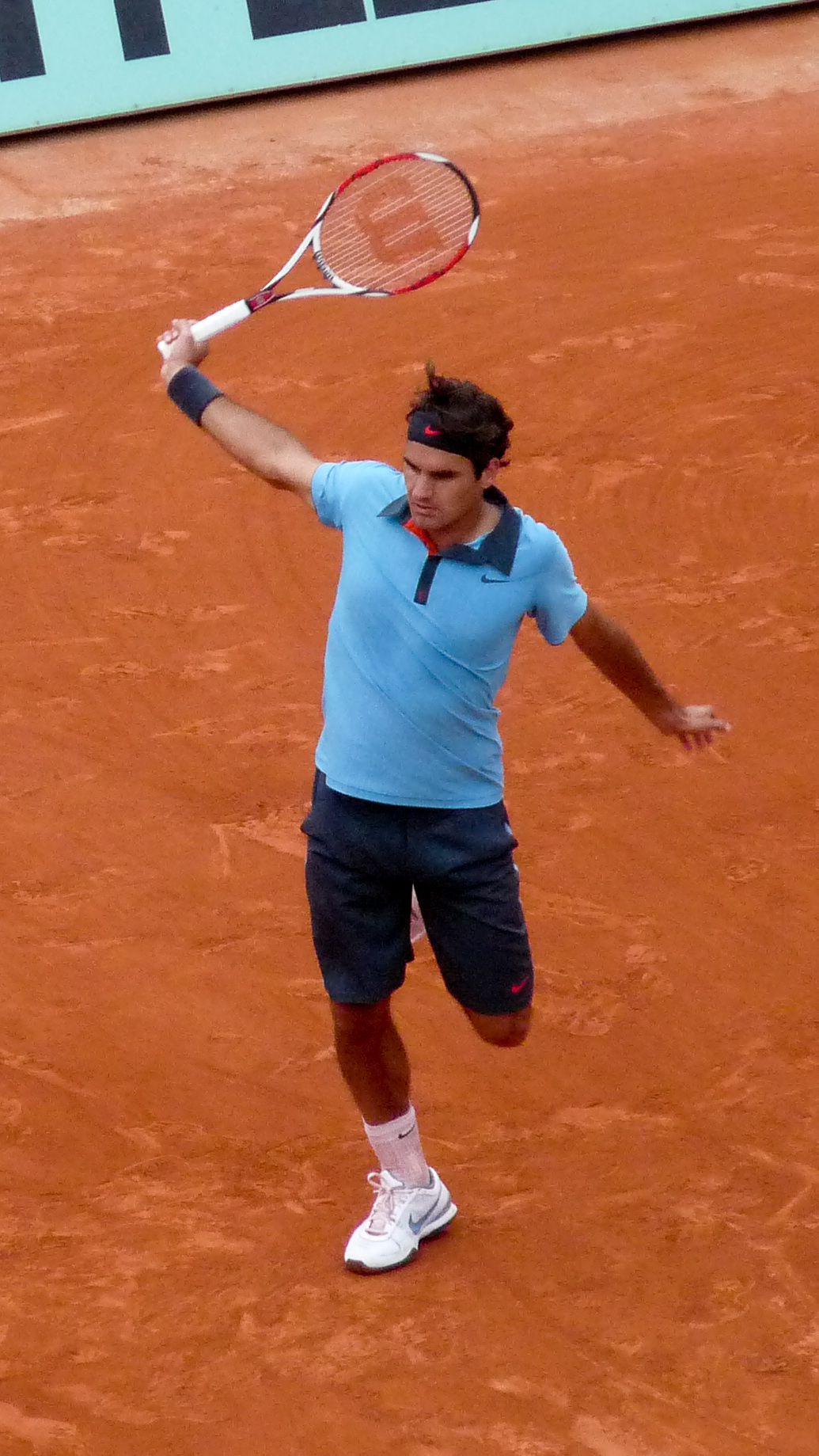
Roger Federer won his first claycourt Slam at the 2009 French Open

On 5 July – after the 2009 Wimbledon Championships – Roger Federer of Switzerland who won his 15th Slam at the tournament over Andy Roddick was announced as the second qualifier.

Roger Federer began the year with a loss to Rafael Nadal at the final of the Australian Open. He won his first title of the year at the Mutua Madrileña Madrid Open defeating Nadal in the final. For his first win over Nadal since 2007 and ending Nadal's 5 match winning streak. After Nadal's early exit, Federer snapped up the French Open, beating Robin Söderling 6–1, 7–6, 6–4 in the final to complete the career Grand Slam. At Wimbledon Federer defeated Andy Roddick in the final. It was the longest match in the final of Wimbledon in terms of games 5–7, 7–6, 7–6, 3–6, 16–14. Federer reclaimed the world no. 1 ranking and broke Pete Sampras's Grand Slam record with a 15th Grand Slam. He won his 4th title of the year at the Western & Southern Financial Group Masters defeating Novak Djokovic. He was also a runner-up at the US Open losing to Juan Martín del Potro and the Davidoff Swiss Indoors losing to Djokovic ending his 3-year run at the tournament. He also reached 4 semi-finals at the Internazionali BNL d'Italia, Sony Ericsson Open, BNP Paribas Open and the Qatar ExxonMobil Open. He has a 27–5 record in the championship having won it on 4 occasions in 2003, 2004, 2006 and 2007. This is his 8th appearance.

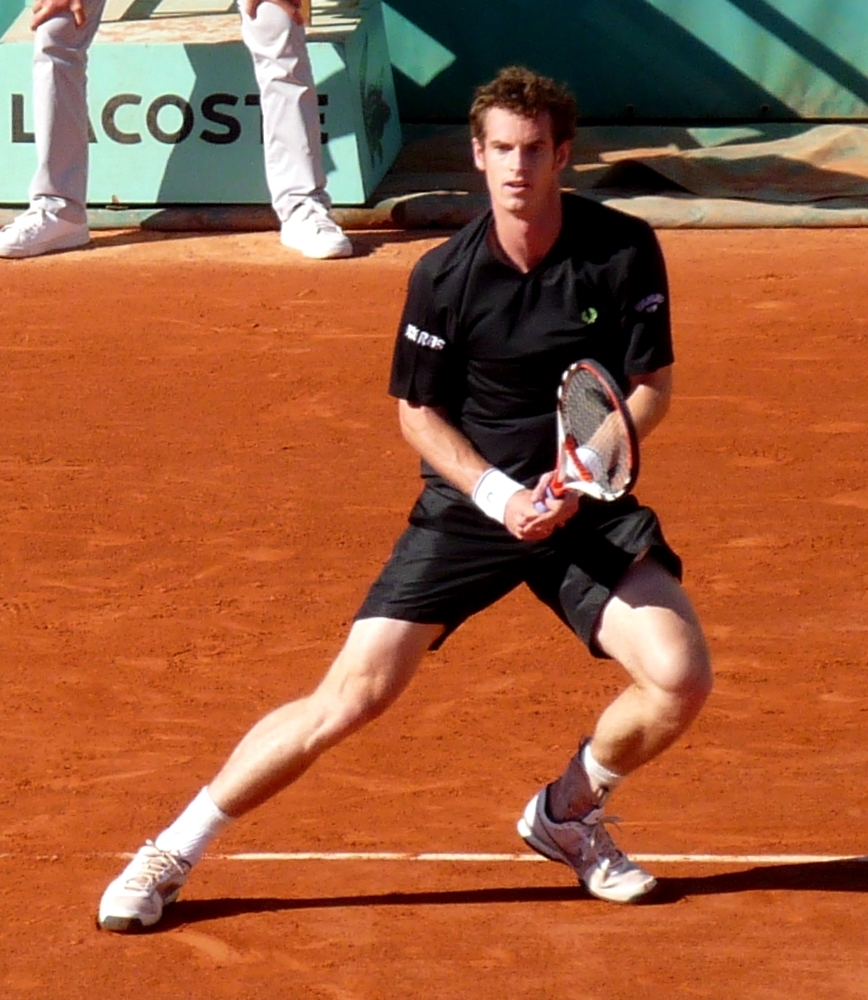
Andy Murray won the most titles this year with 6

On 20 August – After his title in the 2009 Rogers Masters defeating Juan Martín del Potro, Andy Murray of Great Britain was announced as the third qualifier.

Andy Murray won six titles in the year, more than anyone else. With titles in the Qatar ExxonMobil Open, the ABN AMRO World Tennis Tournament, the Sony Ericsson Open. As well as at Queens, in the Rogers Cup and in the Open de Tenis Comunidad Valenciana defeating Mikhail Youzhny. He was also the runner up at the BNP Paribas Open. He missed the Asian Leg due to a wrist injury. At the slams he reached the semifinals for the first time at Wimbledon, as well as the quarterfinals of the French Open for the first time. This is his second appearance with a 3–1 record following his semifinal appearance last year.

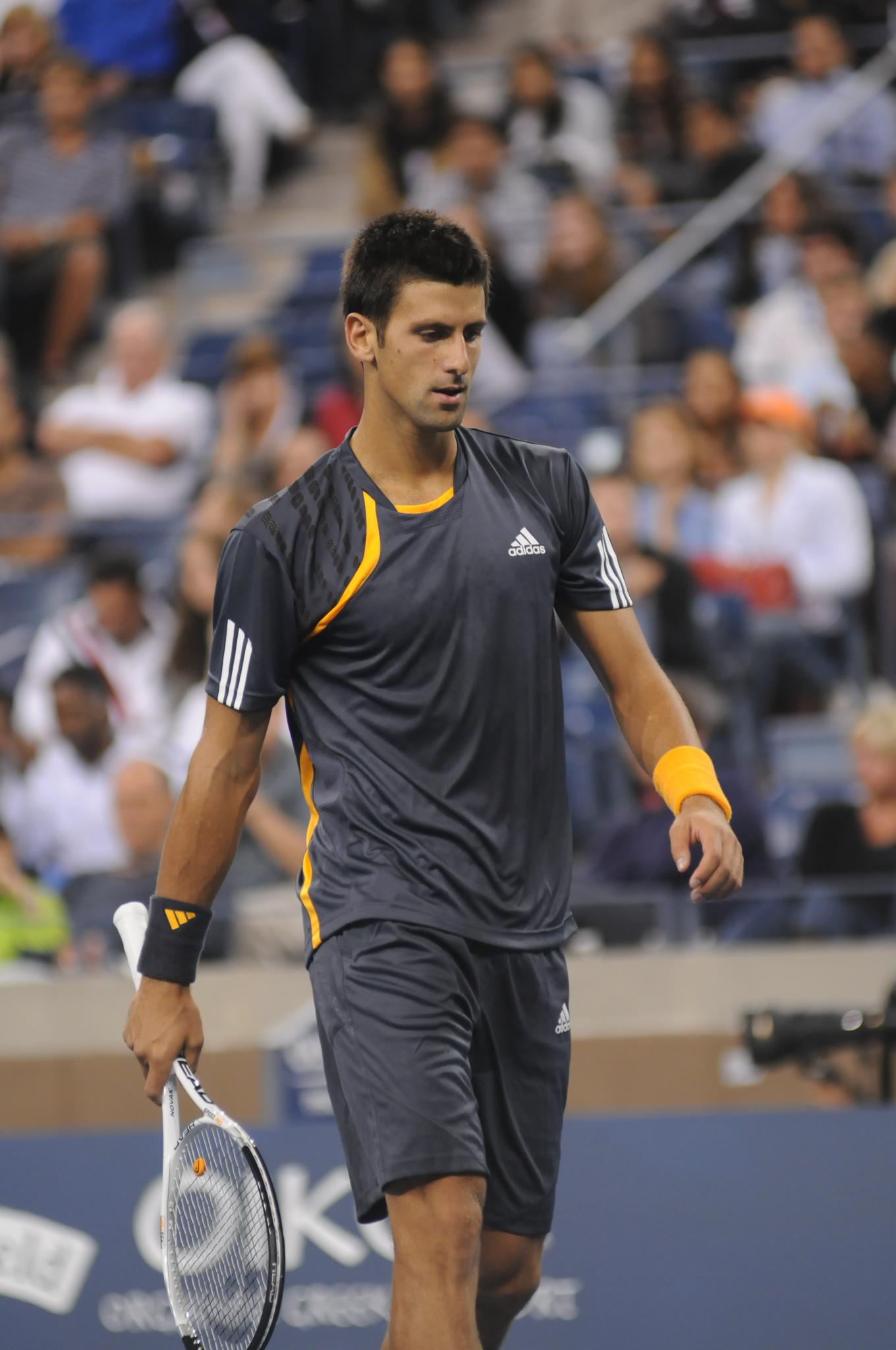
Novak Djokovic is the defending champion

On 10 September – Novak Djokovic of Serbia the defending champion was the Fourth to qualify following his third straight semifinal appearance at the 2009 US Open.

Novak Djokovic made his tennis do the talking as he won his first title of the year in Dubai Tennis Championships defeating David Ferrer. He then won three other titles in the inaugural Serbia Open defeating Łukasz Kubot, China Open defeating Marin Čilić and in Davidoff Swiss Indoors defeating Roger Federer. He then won his first Masters title of the year at the BNP Paribas Masters over Gaël Monfils. He finished as a runner-up at the Western & Southern Financial Group Masters, Gerry Weber Open, Internazionali BNL d'Italia, Monte-Carlo Rolex Masters and the Sony Ericsson Open. He also made the semifinal of the US Open. He is the Defending champion and has a 4–4 record. This is his 3rd appearance.

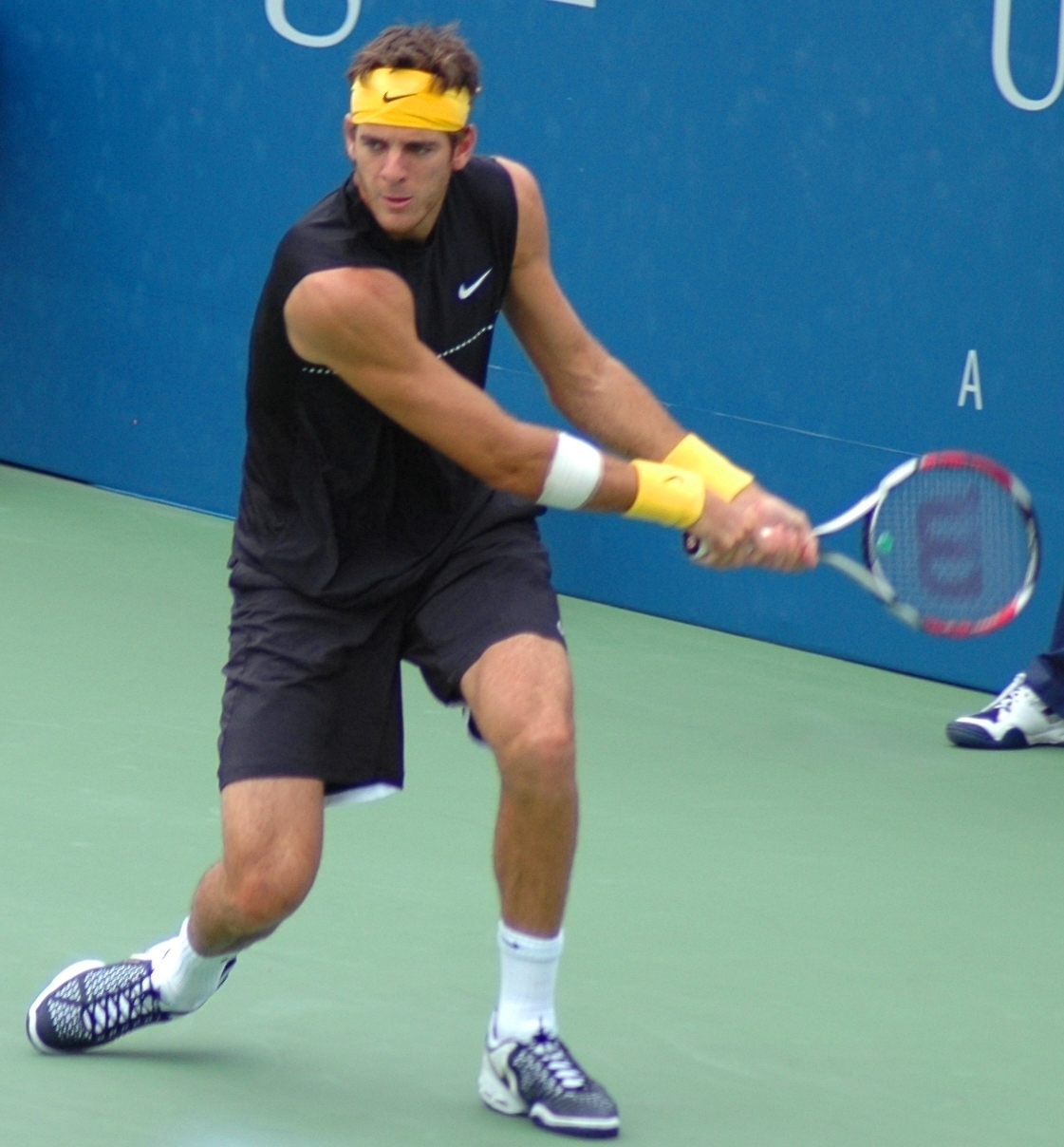
Juan Martín del Potro won his first Slam at the 2009 US Open

On 15 September – after his first Slam win at the 2009 US Open over Roger Federer, Juan Martín del Potro of Argentina became the fifth qualifier.

Juan Martín del Potro produced a break-out year, as he reached a career-high no. 5 and won his first Slam at the 2009 US Open defeating Roger Federer 3–6, 7–6, 4–6, 7–6, 6–2 in the final. He is also the tallest ever Grand Slam champion and the first player to defeat both Nadal and Federer in the same Grand Slam tournament. He also won two other titles at the Heineken Open defeating Sam Querrey, and the Legg Mason Tennis Classic defeating Andy Roddick. He also reached his first Masters final at the Rogers Cup losing to Andy Murray. He also reached the semi-finals at the French Open losing to Federer. Del Potro has a 1–2 record at the championship and is making his 2nd appearance.

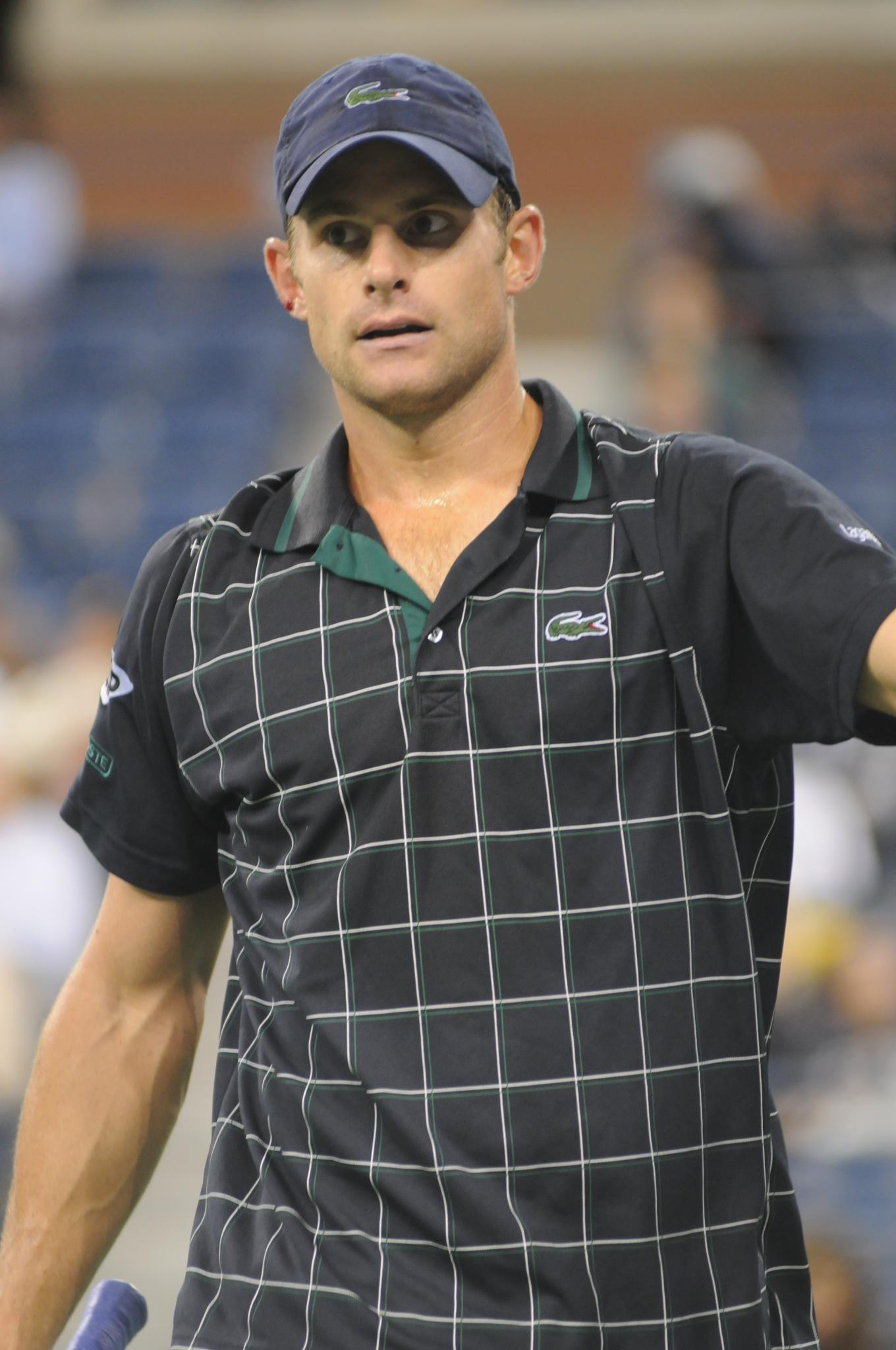
Andy Roddick reached the finals of the 2009 Wimbledon

On 20 September – despite an early exit at the US Open, Andy Roddick of the United States was the sixth qualifier.

Andy Roddick won the Regions Morgan Keegan Championships defeating Radek Štěpánek. His major triumph though came at the Wimbledon finishing as runner-up to Roger Federer. He defeated hometown hero Andy Murray and Lleyton Hewitt en route to this final. As well as finishing as a runner up at the Qatar ExxonMobil Open losing to Murray and the Legg Mason Tennis Classic losing to Juan Martín del Potro. At the Slams, he also reached the semifinals of the Australian Open losing to Federer after defeating Novak Djokovic. Plus making the fourth round of French Open for the first time, losing to Gaël Monfils. This is Andy seventh straight qualificationand his sixth appearance withdrawing in 2005. He has an 8–8 record reaching the semi-final in 2003, 2004, and 2007. Roddick withdrew from the tournament due to a left leg injury suffered at the Shanghai Masters.

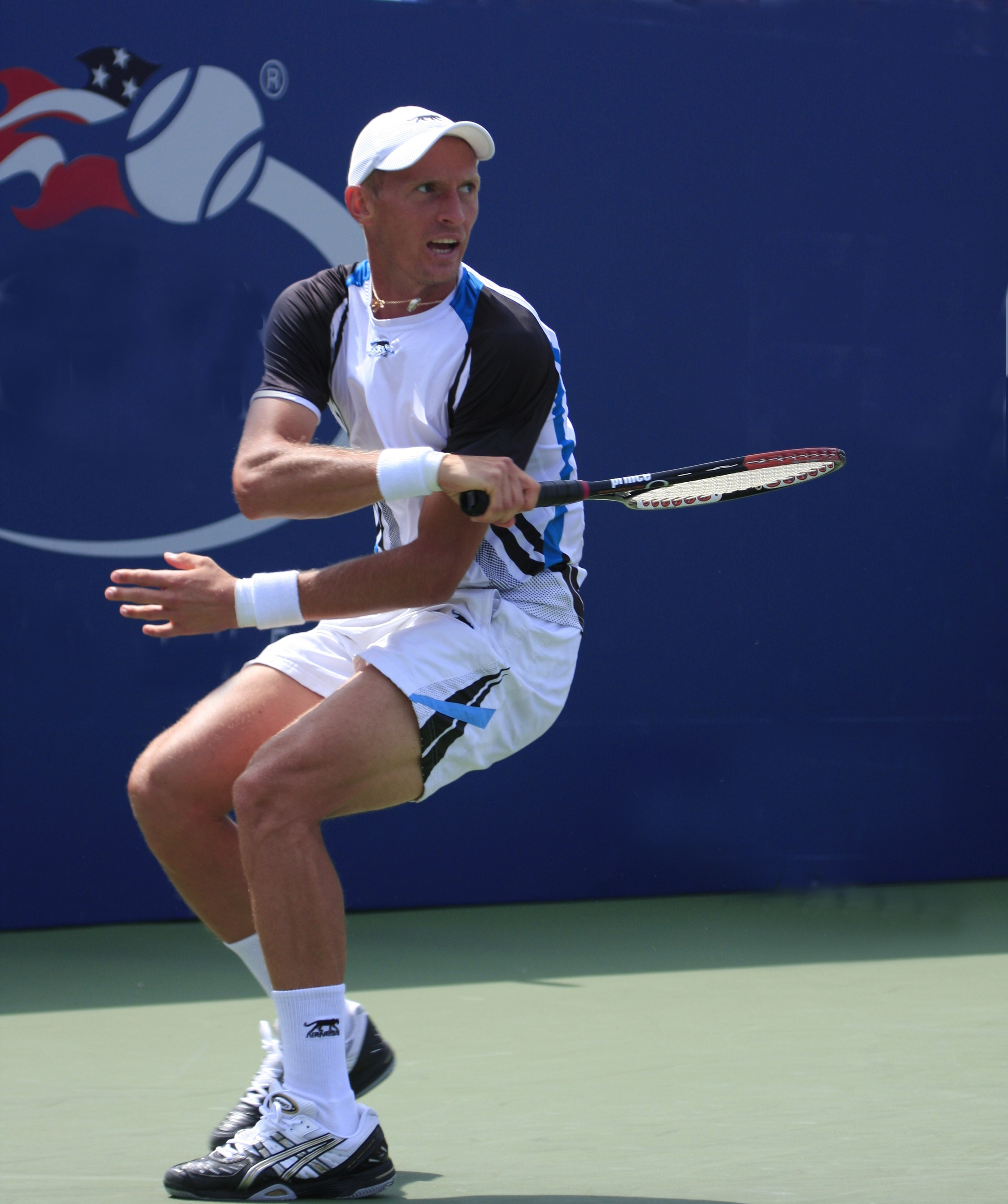
Nikolay Davydenko won his third Masters title at the 2009 Shanghai Masters

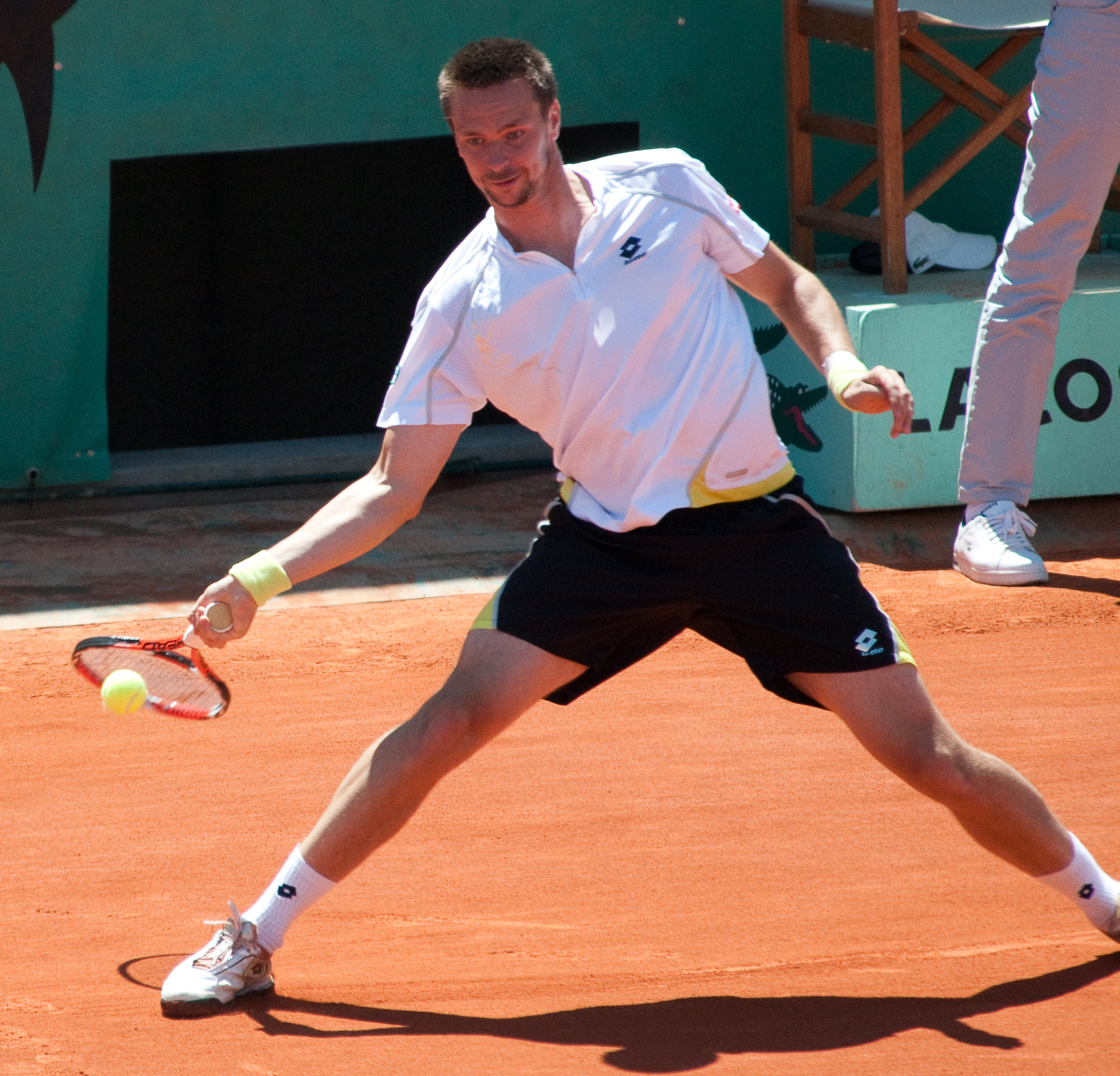
Robin Söderling makes his debut after his best season to date. Reaching the final of the 2009 French Open

On 12 November – After Verdasco fell to Čilić in the third round of the 2009 BNP Paribas Masters last years runner-up Nikolay Davydenko of Russia took one of the last two remaining spots.

Nikolay Davydenko won his first tournament at the International German Open defeating Paul-Henri Mathieu. The following week he won the ATP Studena Croatia Open Umag defeating Juan Carlos Ferrero. As well as the inaugural Proton Malaysian Open defeating Fernando Verdasco. Davydenko then claimed his 3rd Masters title at the Shanghai ATP Masters 1000 upsetting Rafael Nadal after defeating Novak Djokovic. He well as making the quarterfinals of French Open losing to Söderling. This is his fifth appearance with an 8–7 record. His best performance came last year as he reached the final losing to Novak Djokovic.

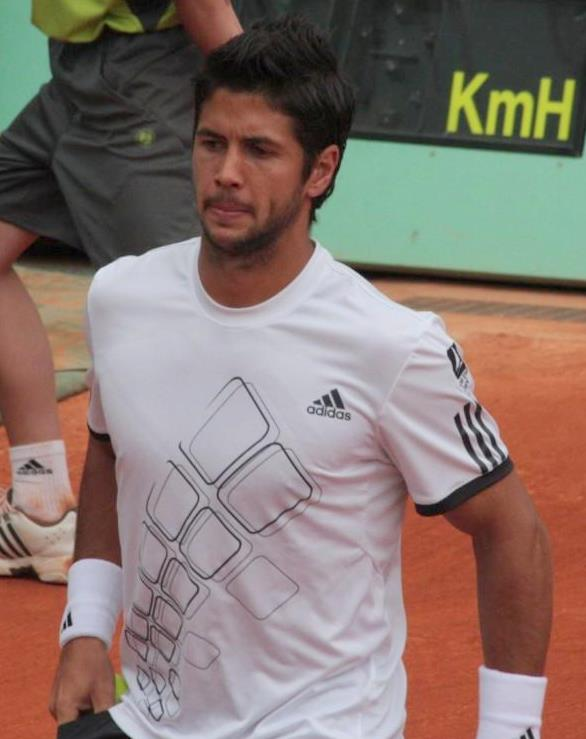
Fernando Verdasco makes his debut at the championship

On 13 November after both Söderling and Tsonga fell to Djokovic and Nadal respectively in the quarterfinals of the 2009 BNP Paribas Masters Australian Open semifinalist Fernando Verdasco occupied the last remaining spot.

Fernando Verdasco started the year well with a semifinal appearance Australian Open losing to Rafael Nadal in a tournament record 5 hour 14 minute battle after five sets. He claimed his third title of his career in the Pilot Pen Tennis prevailing over Sam Querrey. He was also the runner up in the Brisbane International losing to Radek Štěpánek and the Malaysian Open losing to Nikolay Davydenko. Verdasco is making his debut at the championship.

After Roddick's withdrawal due to left leg injury on 17 November Robin Söderling was announced as his replacement.

Robin Söderling 's highlight of the year was reaching the French Open final. After becoming the first player to defeat Rafael Nadal at the Roland Garros. He won his only title of the year at the Catella Swedish Open defeating Juan Mónaco. He reached 4 semifinals as well at the Heineken Open, Proton Malaysian Open, China Open, and the If Stockholm Open. Soderling is making his debut at the event.

The two alternate spots were up for grabs. With the first one was taken by Jo-Wilfried Tsonga who won 3 titles including the SA Tennis Open defeating Jérémy Chardy, the Open 13 defeating Michaël Llodra and at the AIG Japan Open Tennis Championships defeating Mikhail Youzhny. His highlight at the slams was the quarterfinals of the Australian Open losing to Fernando Verdasco. The second spot was taken by Fernando González, who won the 2009 Movistar Open over José Acasuso 6–1 6–3. As well as reaching the semifinals of the French Open losing to Robin Söderling.

== Doubles qualification ==
Rk	Player	Points	Tour	Date Qualified
1	(Canada) Daniel Nestor (Serbia) Nenad Zimonjić	10510	24	5 July 2009
2	(United States) Bob Bryan (United States) Mike Bryan	9680	24	5 July 2009
3	(India) Mahesh Bhupathi (The Bahamas) Mark Knowles	5950	19	10 September 2009
4	(Czech Republic) Lukáš Dlouhý (India) Leander Paes	5740	15	10 September 2009
5	(Czech Republic) František Čermák (Slovakia) Michal Mertiňák	3670	32	11 November 2009
6	(Poland) Łukasz Kubot (Austria) Oliver Marach	3660	22	9 November 2009
7	(Belarus) Max Mirnyi (Israel) Andy Ram	3550	15	11 November 2009
8	(Poland) Mariusz Fyrstenberg (Poland) Marcin Matkowski	3335	26	13 November 2009

The first two teams qualified for the year-end doubles tournament on 5 July. They were the defending champions Daniel Nestor of Canada and Nenad Zimonjić of Serbia and the American brother duo of Bob Bryan and Mike Bryan from the United States following their doubles final at the 2009 Wimbledon.

Daniel Nestor and Nenad Zimonjić played their second full tour together. They started with back-to-back runner-up finishes at the Qatar ExxonMobil Open and at the Medibank International Sydney to the Bryans. They claimed their first title of the year at the ABN AMRO World Tennis Tournament. They then claimed three back-to-back titles at Monte-Carlo and Internazionali BNL d'Italia and the Barcelona Open Banco Sabadell. They claimed their fourth title at the Mutua Madrileña Madrid Open. The Canadian-Serbian duo hit back from a two-set deficit in The Championships semi-finals at Wimbledon, against James Blake and Mardy Fish, before edging the Bryans in a four-set final. They won their 7th and 8th titles at the Western & Southern Financial Group Masters and at the Davidoff Swiss Indoors. They won their 9th title and 5th Masters of the year, at the BNP Paribas Masters, and reached the semifinals of the French Open. They have a record of 5 and 0. With a best of Champions last year, this is their 2nd appearance.

Bob Bryan and Mike Bryan began with back-to-back titles in Australia by winning the Medibank International Sydney and winning their 7th Slam at the Australian Open. They won their third title of the year at the Delray Beach International Tennis Championships. The brothers added the U.S. Men's Clay Court Championships. They won the LA Tennis Open and China Open. They also reached 5 other finals, Monte-Carlo, Internazionali BNL d'Italia, Wimbledon, Western & Southern Financial Group and Davidoff. They were the only team to reach the semifinal or better at all 4 slams. Bob Bryan also won the French Open Mixed Doubles playing with Liezel Huber. This is their 10th appearance.

On 10 September the teams of Mahesh Bhupathi/Mark Knowles and Lukáš Dlouhý/Leander Paes following the US Open finals, the two teams are competing in their second straight year-end championship.

Mahesh Bhupathi and Mark Knowles only win came at the Rogers cup. They also finished as runner-up at the Australian Open and at the US Open. As well as at the Barcelona Open Banco Sabadell. Separately Bhupathi won the Australian mixed doubles with Mirza. Knowles won the Regions Morgan Keegan Championships with Fish and the Wimbledon mixed doubles with Anna-Lena Grönefeld. and the final of the China Open with Roddick.

Lukáš Dlouhý and Leander Paes won two out of four Grand Slams. They won the French Open. and the US Open. They finished as runners-up at ABN AMRO. They reached the Australian Open semifinals. Paes separately reached and lost three finals, the Heineken Open with Scott Lipsky and the Mixed doubles finals of both Wimbledon and the US Open with Cara Black.

The last four qualifiers were decided at the 2009 BNP Paribas Masters. They were Łukasz Kubot/Oliver Marach, František Čermák/Michal Mertiňák, Max Mirnyi/Andy Ram only after Wesley Moodie/Dick Norman were ousted. Mariusz Fyrstenberg/Marcin Matkowski qualified after winning their quarterfinal match-up against the Bryans.

Łukasz Kubot and Oliver Marach claimed three doubles titles, in their debut year. They took the Grand Prix Hassan II, the Serbia Open and the Bank Austria-TennisTrophy. They also reached the final of the Abierto Mexicano Telcel. At the Slams, they were able to reach their first Major semifinals at the Australian.

František Čermák and Michal Mertiňák, in their first year on tour together, won 5 titles., the Abierto Mexicano Telcel, the MercedesCup, at the ATP Studena Croatia Open Umag, the BCR Open Romania, and finally at the Valencia Open 500. They also reached the finals of the Movistar Open.

Max Mirnyi and Andy Ram reached three finals, all Masters 1000 events. They won one of these finals at the Sony Ericsson and lost the BNP Paribas Open and the Rogers Masters. They reached the US Open semifinal. Ram separately finished as runner-up at the Australian mixed doubles with Nathalie Dechy and at the Open 13 with Julian Knowle.

Mariusz Fyrstenberg and Marcin Matkowski won the Aegon International and the Malaysian Open. They also reached the finals of the Legg Mason Tennis Classic.

== Points breakdown ==
=== Singles ===
Rank	Athlete	Grand Slam				ATP World Tour Masters 1000								ATP 500				ATP 250		Total points	Tours
Rank	Athlete	AO	FO	W	USO	IW	MI	MA	RO	CA	CI	SH	PA	1	2	3	4	5	6	Total points	Tours
1	(Switzerland) Roger Federer*	F 1,200	W 2,000	W 2,000	F 1,200	SF; 360	SF; 360	W 1,000	SF; 360	QF; 180	W 1,000	A 0	R32; 10	F 300	R16; 90	- 0	- 0	SF; 90		10,150	15
2	(Spain) Rafael Nadal*	W 2.000	R16; 180	A 0	SF; 720	W 1,000	QF; 180	F 600	W 1,000	QF; 180	SF; 360	F 600	SF; 360	W 1,000	W 500	F 300	SF; 180	QF; 45		9,205	17
3	(Serbia) Novak Djokovic*	QF; 360	R32; 90	QF; 360	SF; 720	QF; 180	F 600	SF; 360	F 600	QF; 180	F 600	SF; 360	W 1,000	F 600	W 500	W 500	W 500	W 250	F 150	7,910	22
4	(United Kingdom) Andy Murray*	R16; 180	QF; 360	SF; 720	R16; 180	F 600	W 1,000	QF; 180	R32; 10	W 1,000	SF; 360	A 0	R16; 180	W 500	W 500	SF; 360	QF; 90	W 250	W 250	6,630	18
5	(Argentina) Juan Martín del Potro*	QF; 360	SF; 720	R64; 45	W 2,000	QF; 180	SF; 360	SF; 360	QF; 180	F 600	A 0	R32; 10	QF; 180	W 500	QF; 90	DC; 80	R32; 0	W 250	RR; 70	5,985	21
–	(United States) Andy Roddick*	SF; 720	R16; 180	F 1,200	R32; 90	SF; 360	QF; 180	QF; 180	A 0	SF; 360	R32; 10	R32; 10	A 0	W 500	F 300	DC; 80	R32; 0	F 150	SF; 90	4,410	20
6	(Russia) Nikolay Davydenko*	A 0	QF; 360	R32; 90	R16; 180	A 0	A 0	R32; 10	R16; 90	QF; 180	R16; 90	W 1,000	R16; 90	W 500	SF; 180	SF; 180	QF; 180	W 250	W 250	3,630	25
7	(Spain) Fernando Verdasco*	SF; 720	R16; 180	R16; 180	QF; 360	QF; 180	QF; 180	QF; 180	QF; 180	R16; 90	R64; 10	R32; 10	R16; 90	SF; 180	QF; 180	QF; 90	QF; 90	W 250	F 150	3,300	23
8	(Sweden) Robin Söderling*	R64; 45	F 1,200	R16; 180	QF; 360	R64; 10	R64; 10	R32; 45	R16; 90	A 0	R64; 10	QF; 180	QF; 180	SF; 180	QF; 90	R16; 45	R32; 20	W 250	RR; 105	3,000	25

=== Doubles ===
Rank	Team	Points																		Total Points	Tourn
Rank	Team	1	2	3	4	5	6	7	8	9	10	11	12	13	14	15	16	17	18	Total Points	Tourn
1	Daniel Nestor (CAN); Nenad Zimonjić (SRB)	W 2000	W 1000	W 1000	W 1000	W 1000	W 1000	SF; 720	W 500	W 500	W 500	SF; 360	QF; 360	SF; 180	F 150	F 150	R32; 90	R16; 0	R16; 0	10,510	24
2	Bob Bryan (USA); Mike Bryan (USA)	W 2000	F 1200	SF; 720	SF; 720	F 600	F 600	F 600	W 500	SF; 360	SF; 360	SF; 360	F 300	W 250	W 250	W 250	W 250	SF; 180	QF; 180	9,680	24
3	Mahesh Bhupathi (IND); Mark Knowles (BAH)	F 1200	F 1200	W 1000	SF; 360	SF; 360	SF; 360	QF; 360	F 300	QF; 180	R16; 180	SF; 90	QF; 90	QF; 90	R16; 90	QF; 45	QF; 45	R32; 0	R16; 0	5,950	19
4	Lukáš Dlouhý (CZE); Leander Paes (IND)	W 2000	W 2000	SF; 720	SF; 360	F 300	QF; 180	R16; 90	R16; 90	R16; 0	R64; 0	R16; 0	R16; 0	R16; 0	R16; 0	R16; 0				5,740	15
5	František Čermák (CZE); Michal Mertiňák (SVK)	W 500	W 500	SF; 360	W 250	W 250	W 250	SF; 180	QF; 180	QF; 180	QF; 180	F 150	F 150	SF; 90	SF; 90	QF; 90	R32; 90	R32; 90	R32; 90	3,670	32
6	Łukasz Kubot (POL); Oliver Marach (AUT)	SF; 720	SF; 360	QF; 360	F 300	W 250	W 250	W 250	SF; 180	QF; 180	QF; 180	SF; 90	SF; 90	SF; 90	QF; 90	QF; 90	R16; 90	R32; 90	QF; 0	3,660	22
7	Max Mirnyi (BLR); Andy Ram (ISR)	W 1000	SF; 720	F 600	F 600	QF; 180	R16; 180	R32; 90	R16; 90	QF; 45	QF; 45	R16; 0	R64; 0	R16; 0	R16; 0	R16; 0				3,550	15
8	Mariusz Fyrstenberg (POL); Marcin Matkowski (POL)	F 600	SF; 360	QF; 360	F 300	W 250	W 250	QF; 180	QF; 180	QF; 180	QF; 180	QF; 180	SF; 90	R32; 90	QF; 90	QF; 45	R64; 0	R64; 0	R64; 0	3,335	26

== Groupings ==
The tournament was conducted in a round robin format. The eight players/teams divided in two groups. The eight seeds were determined by the South African Airways ATP rankings and the 2009 ATP Doubles Team Rankings of Monday, 16 November 2009. The top seed was placed in Group A and the second seed placed in Group B. Players/teams seeded three and four, five and six, seven and eight, were then drawn in pairs placing the first drawn in Group A.

=== Singles grouping ===
Group A: Consisted of Roger Federer, Andy Murray, Juan Martín del Potro and Fernando Verdasco. Against the rest of the group, Roger Federer was 12–7, Andy Murray was 17–5, Juan Martín del Potro was 2–10 and Fernando Verdasco was 1–10.

Andy Murray led 6–3 against Federer, having won 4 of their last 5 meetings at that point. Murray was 4–1 against del Potro and 7–1 over Verdasco. Federer was 3–0 against Verdasco and 6–1 over del Potro. Verdasco and del Potro faced each other for the first time.

Group B: Against the rest of the group, Rafael Nadal was 21–10, Novak Djokovic 13–16, Nikolay Davydenko 8–12 and Robin Söderling 7–11.

Nadal was 14–6 with Djokovic. Nadal led 4–3 against Davydenko. Nadal edged Soderling, 3–1. Djokovic was tied with Davydenko at 2–2, and was 5–0 against Söderling. Söderling led Davydenko 6–3 including 5 of their last 6 meetings.

=== Doubles grouping ===
Group A: Nestor/Zimonjić were joined by Bhupathi/Knowles, Čermák/Michal Mertiňák and Fyrstenberg/Matkowski. Against the rest of the group Nestor/Zimonjić were 8–3, whilst Bhupathi/Knowles were 7–1. Čermák/Mertiňák were 0–1 and Frystenberg/Matkowski were 2–8.

Nestor/Zimonjic were 3–1 against Bhupathi/Knowles, 4–2 against Fyrstenberg/Matkowski and 1–0 against Cermak/Mertinak. Bhupathi and Knowles had never played Cermak/Mertinak but were 4 and 0 against Fyrstenberg/Matkowski. Cermak/Merinak had never faced Fyrstenberg/Matkowski.

Group B: Against the rest of the group the Bryans were 7–3, while Dlouhý/Paes were 1–3 while Ram/Mirnyi were at 2–2 and Kubot and Marach were 0–3.

The Bryans were 3–1 up against Dlouhý/Paes, 2–2 with Ram/Mirnyi and 3–0 against Kubot/Marach. Ram/Mirnyi and Dlouhý/Paes had never faced their other opponents.

== Player head-to-heads ==
These are the head-to-heads as they approach the tournament.

		Federer	Nadal	Djokovic	Murray	del Potro	Davydenko	Verdasco	Söderling	Overall
1	(Switzerland) Roger Federer		7–13	9–5	4–6	6–2	12–1	4–0	12–0	53–27
2	(Spain) Rafael Nadal	13–7		14–7	7–2	4–3	4–3	9–0	3–1	54–25
3	(Serbia) Novak Djokovic	5–9	7–14		4–3	3–0	3–2	5–2	5–1	32–31
4	(United Kingdom) Andy Murray	6–4	2–7	3–4		5–1	5–4	8–1	2–1	31–22
5	(Argentina) Juan Martín del Potro	2–6	3–4	0–3	1–5		1–3	1–0	2–1	10–22
6	(Russia) Nikolay Davydenko	1–12	4–4	2–3	4–5	3–1		6–1	4–6	24–33
7	(Spain) Fernando Verdasco	0–4	0–9	2–5	1–8	0–1	1–6		1–4	5–34
8	(Sweden) Robin Söderling	0–12	2–3	1–5	1–2	1–2	6–4	4–1		15–28

== Prize money and points ==
Stage	Singles	Doubles^{1}	Points
Champion	+$770,000	+$125,000	+500
Semifinal win	+$380,000	+$30,000	+400
Round robin (3 wins)	$480,000^{2}	$122,500^{3}	600
Round robin (2 wins)	$360,000^{2}	$100,000^{3}	400
Round robin (1 win)	$240,000^{2}	$87,500^{3}	200
Round robin (0 wins)	$120,000^{2}	$65,000^{3}	0
Alternates	$70,000	$25,000	–

- ^{1} Prize money for doubles is per team.
- ^{2} Pro-rated on a per match basis: $70,000 = 1 match, $95,000 = 2 matches, $120,000 = 3 matches
- ^{3} Pro-rated on a per match basis: $30,000 = 1 match, $50,000 = 2 matches, $65,000 = 3 matches

== Day-by-day summaries ==
=== Day 1: 22 November 2009 ===
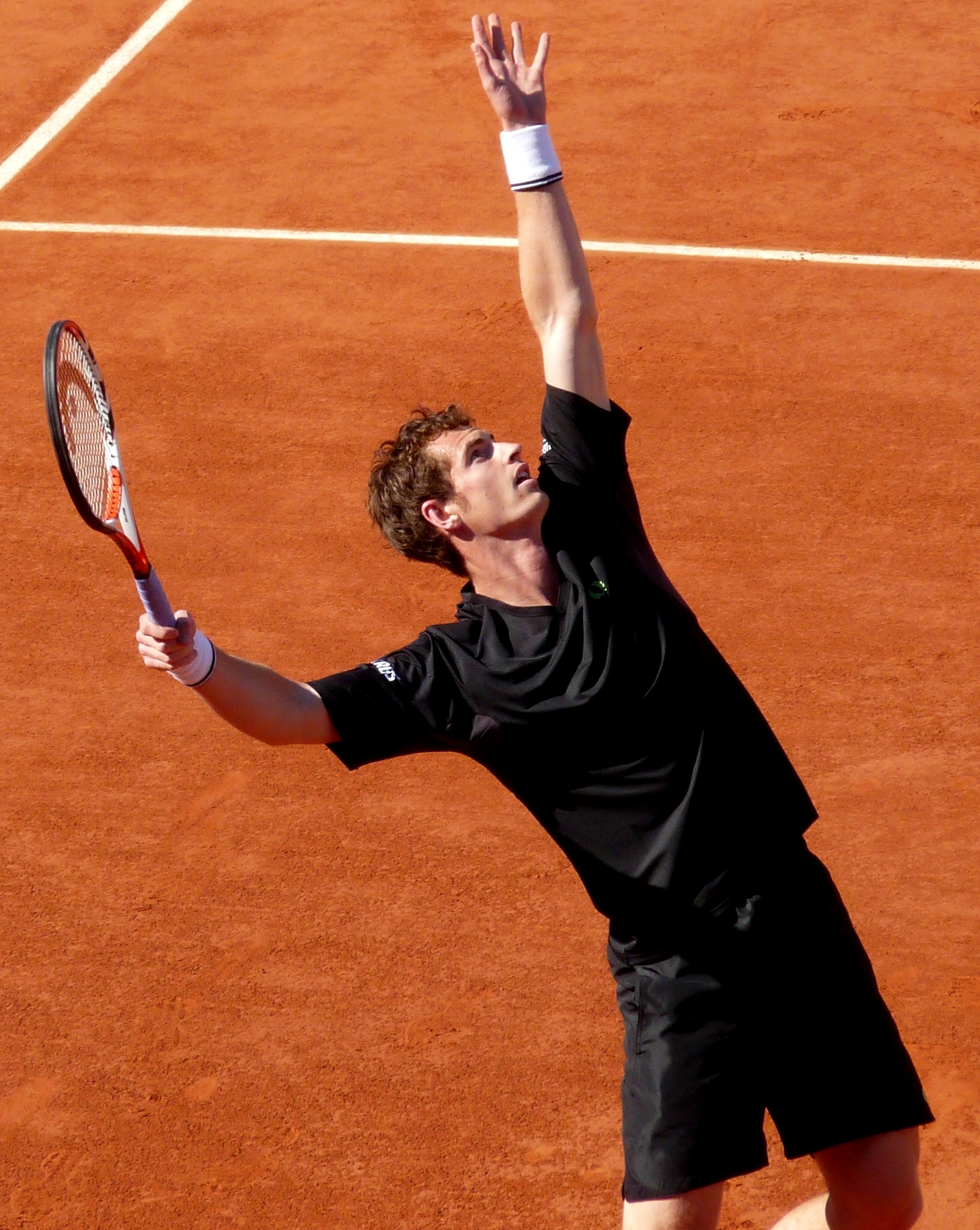
Andy Murray claims victory over Juan Martín del Potro

The tournament started with group A doubles action. In the opening match the top doubles team and defending champions Nestor/Zimonjić being upset by Fyrstenberg/Matkowski 6–4, 6–4. The Polish team faced no break points.

In the first singles match, 2008 semifinalist Murray fought del Potro. Murray went up 5–0 over Del Potro, who took a medical timeout at 3–0, for a nosebleed. Del Potro dropped to 15–40, but eventually saved two set points and won the game. At 5–1, on the second break point Del Potro challenged Murray's apparent ace and won the break. Both players then held, giving Murray the first set 6–3. In the second set, Del Potro looked rejuvenated taking the first 3 games; breaking at love in the second game. Murray broke in the 5th game to bring it back to serve. The Argentine broke again and held to lead 5–2. Both players held, requiring a third set. The decider saw a change of roles as Murray broke in the second game at his second chance to lead 3–0. The servers held the next four games to 5–2. At 5–2 Del Potro went down 15–30, and then double-faulted, giving Murray 2 match points. Murray converted the second.

Number 3 Bhupathi/Knowles dominated Čermák/Mertiňák 6–3, 6–3.

Federer/Verdasco started with Verdasco breaking Federer and holding to lead 2–0. At 3–2, Verdasco was warned for taking too much time. Verdasco held for a 4–2 lead. In the next game Federer saved two break points. The two players then held, giving Verdasco the set 6–4. In the second set both players held serve comfortably to 6–5, when Federer broke to win the set 7–5. In the 3rd, Federer took a 5–0 lead and won 4–6, 7–5, 6–1.

Matches on O_{2} arena
Group	Winner	Loser	Score
Doubles – Group A	(Poland) Mariusz Fyrstenberg [8] (Poland) Marcin Matkowski [8]	(Canada) Daniel Nestor [1] (Serbia) Nenad Zimonjić [1]	6–4, 6–4
Singles – Group A	(United Kingdom) Andy Murray [4]	(Argentina) Juan Martín del Potro [5]	6–3, 3–6, 6–2
Doubles – Group A	(India) Mahesh Bhupathi [3] (The Bahamas) Mark Knowles [3]	(Czech Republic) František Čermák [5] (Slovakia) Michal Mertiňák [5]	6–3, 6–3
Singles – Group A	(Switzerland) Roger Federer [1]	(Spain) Fernando Verdasco [7]	4–6, 7–5, 6–1
1st match starts at 12:30 pm, 2nd at 2:15 pm, 3rd at 7:00 pm and 4th at 8:45 pm

=== Day 2: 23 November 2009 ===
Nadal/Söderling was a sequel to the fourth round of the French Open. Söderling broke in the second game and led 3–0, quickly reversed by Nadal for 3–3. From there both players held to 5–4. At 40–30 Nadal made three unforced errors, giving Söderling the first at 6–4. In the second set Nadal broke in the 3rd game for 2–1. Nadal then saved two break points before Söderling challenged a backhand from Nadal. Both players then held. At 5–4 Nadal faced match point at 30–40, which Söderling converted to win the set 6–4 and the match.

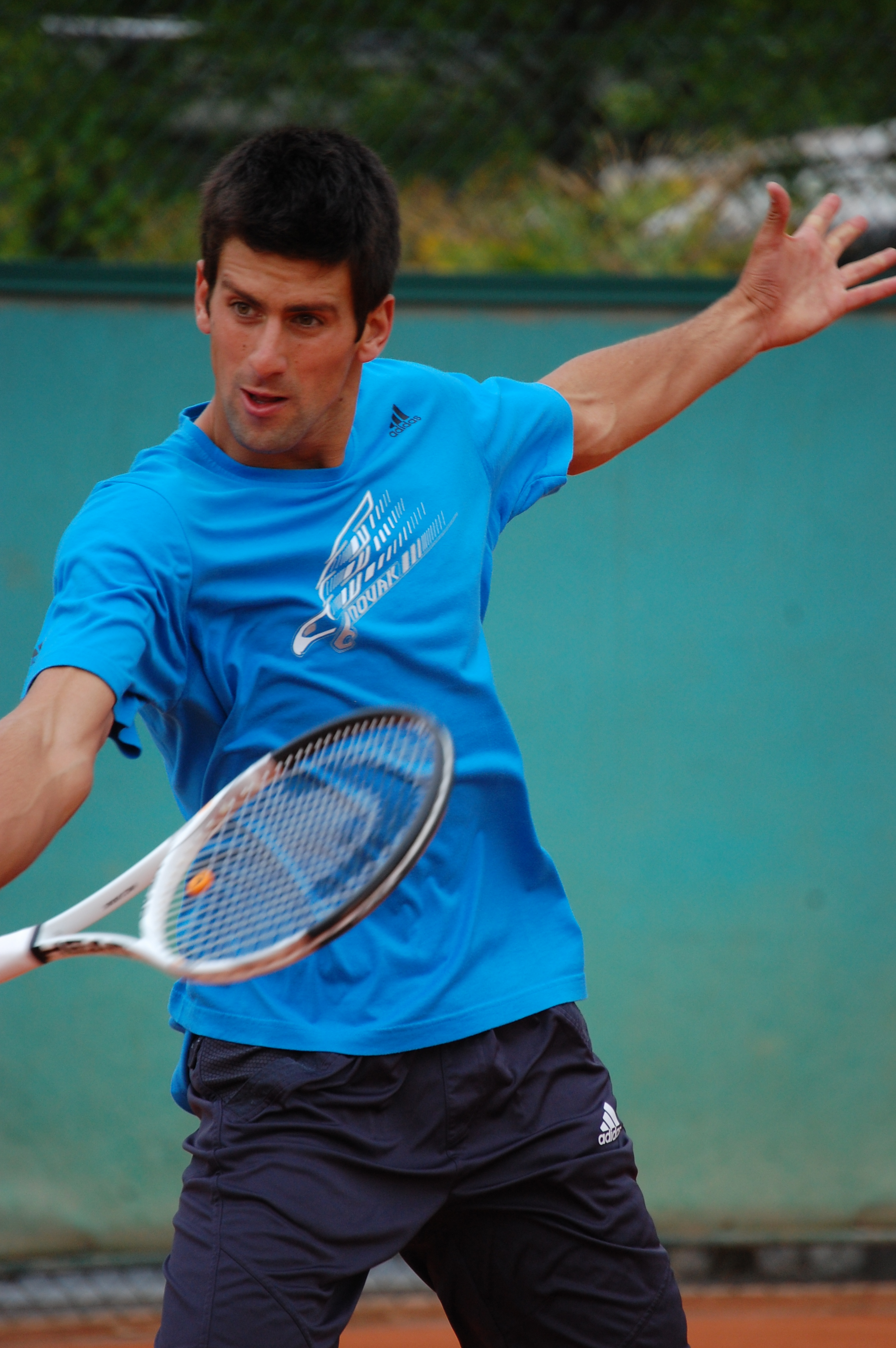
Novak Djokovic avenged his Shanghai loss

The final match repeated last year's final pitting Djokovic against Davydenko. At 2–2 in the 1st Davydenko broke at love. Then the Russian saved one break point for 4–2. Both then held. Djokovic faced two set points and gave Davydenko the first set 6–3. At 2–2 on serve in the 2nd Davydenko saved two break points to lead 3–2. At 4–4 Davydenko's unforced errors gave Djokovic a break and he served out the set 6–4. In the decider Djokovic broke early for 2–0. He served for the match at 5–4 but Davydenko broke back. Djokovic broke back and served the match out.

The doubles competition produced two upsets as Mirnyi/Ram beat World no. 2 the Bryans 6–4, 6–4. Kubot/Marach defeated Dlouhý/Paes in straight sets.

Matches on O_{2} arena
Group	Winner	Loser	Score
Doubles – Group B	(Belarus) Max Mirnyi [7] (Israel) Andy Ram [7]	(United States) Bob Bryan [2] (United States) Mike Bryan [2]	6–4, 6–4
Singles – Group B	(Sweden) Robin Söderling [8]	(Spain) Rafael Nadal [2]	6–4, 6–4
Doubles – Group B	(Poland) Łukasz Kubot [6] (Austria) Oliver Marach [6]	(Czech Republic) Lukáš Dlouhý [4] (India) Leander Paes [4]	6–4, 7–6^{(7–3)}
Singles – Group B	(Serbia) Novak Djokovic [3]	(Russia) Nikolay Davydenko [6]	3–6, 6–4, 7–5
1st match starts at 12:30 pm, 2nd at 2:15 pm, 3rd at 7:00 pm and 4th at 8:45 pm

=== Day 3: 24 November 2009 ===
The next day del Potro and Verdasco played each other for the first time. In the 3rd game del Potro broke at 15. Both held giving del Potro the first set 6–4. At 4–3 in the second Verdasco converted the first break point to lead 5–3. Verdasco won 6–3 triggering a deciding set. Verdasco went down 3–2 and 0–40. He saved 2 break points but at 30–40, del Potro challenged a Verdasco forehand called in. Hawk-Eye reversed the call giving del Potro a 4–2 lead. Verdasco saved match point at 5–2, then Verdasco broke and held to level the set at 5–5. Del Potro won the eventual tie-break 7–1.

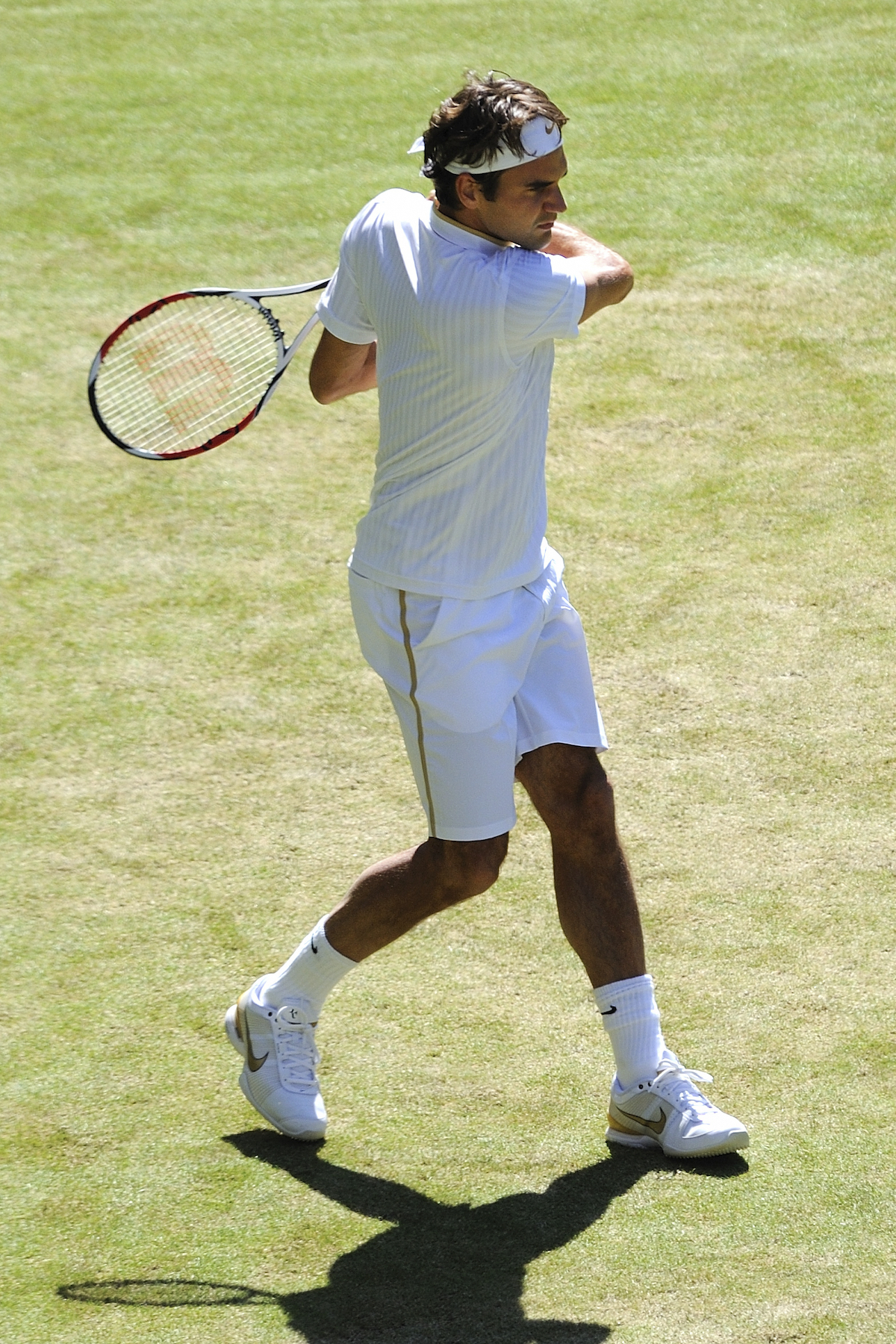
Roger Federer claims fourth win over Murray

Federer then took on Murray. Both players immediately broke, then at 3–2 Federer held only 2 of 3 break points. The first set went to Murray 6–3. In the 6th game of the second set the Swiss was able to break and served it out for 6–3. Federer then broke in the third, fifth and seventh games to finish 6–1.

Bhupathi/Knowles outlasted Fyrstenberg/Matkowski 3–6, 6–3, [10–7], taking them to the semifinal. Defending champions Nestor/Zimonjić lost to Čermák/Mertiňák 6–3, 6–4.

Matches on O_{2} arena
Group	Winner	Loser	Score
Doubles – Group A	(India) Mahesh Bhupathi [3] (The Bahamas) Mark Knowles [3]	(Poland) Mariusz Fyrstenberg [8] (Poland) Marcin Matkowski [8]	3–6, 6–3, [10–7]
Singles – Group A	(Argentina) Juan Martín del Potro [5]	(Spain) Fernando Verdasco [7]	6–4, 3–6, 7–6^{(7–1)}
Doubles – Group A	(Czech Republic) František Čermák [5] (Slovakia) Michal Mertiňák [5]	(Canada) Daniel Nestor [1] (Serbia) Nenad Zimonjić [1]	6–3, 6–4
Singles – Group A	(Switzerland) Roger Federer [1]	(United Kingdom) Andy Murray [4]	3–6, 6–3, 6–1
1st match starts at 12:30 pm, 2nd at 2:15 pm, 3rd at 7:00 pm and 4th at 8:45 pm

=== Day 4: 25 November 2009 ===
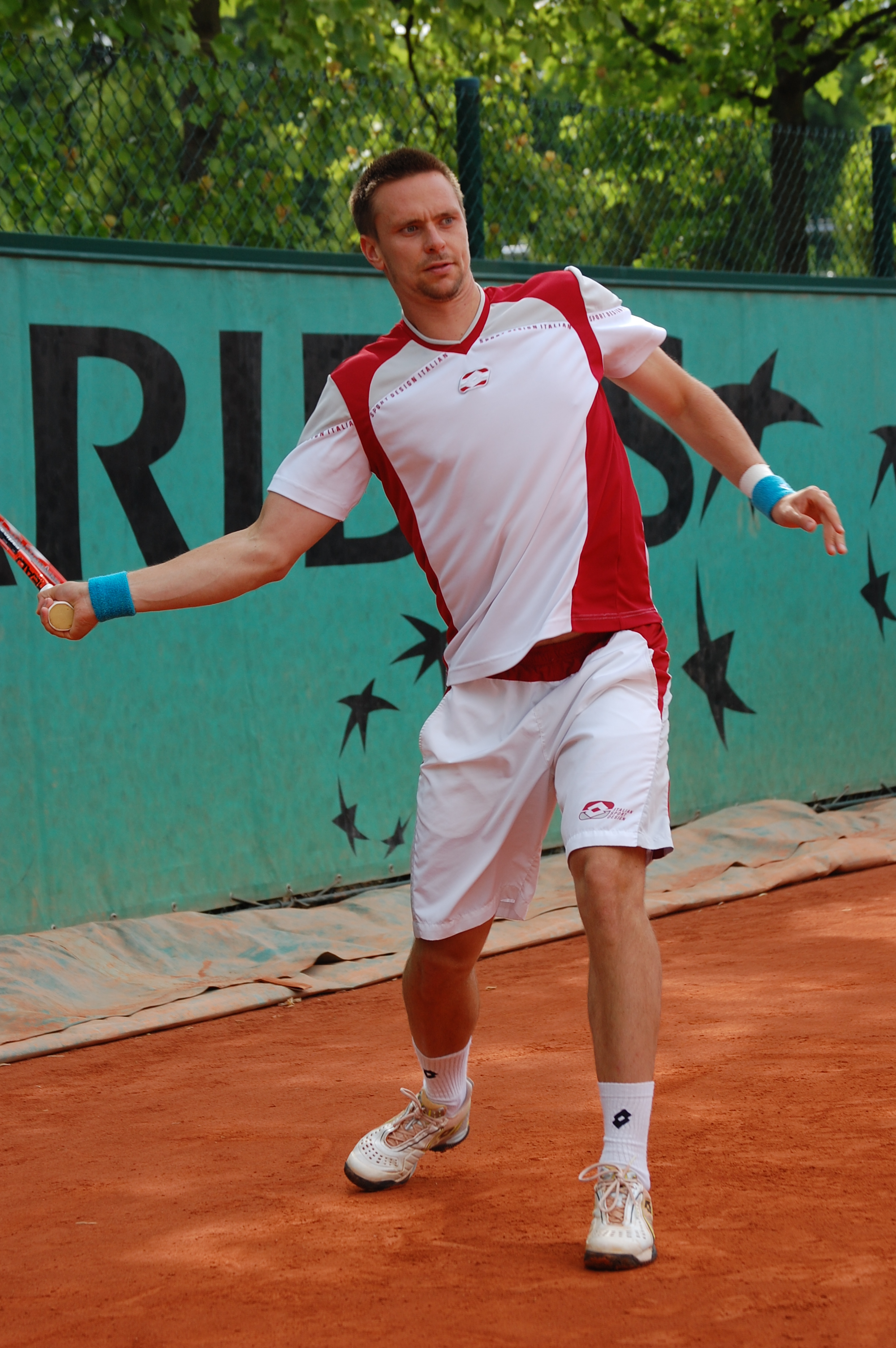
Robin Söderling advances to the semifinals with first victory over Djokovic

First Söderling battled Djokovic. No break opportunities emerged until 5–4 when Djokovic saved 3. In the following tie-break, the Swede took a 2–0 lead and then the Serb took three. Söderling got a mini-break for 6–4, and won at 7–5. Djokovic then won the opening game but then Söderling won the next six to advance to the semifinal.

The next match was a Shanghai final rematch between Davydenko and Nadal. Davydenko raced into a 3–0 lead. In the 6th game Davydenko broke again, and served it out at 6–1. Davydenko broke Nadal in the 5th game of the 2nd and then saved two break points in the 6th for 4–2. Nadal then broke Davydenko to level it at 4–4. Both held through to a tie break. Nadal got a mini-break for 2–1, but gave it back for 3–3. Davydenko then broke for 5–3. Davydenko converted his second match point to win at 7–4. For the first time in his World Tour Finals history, Nadal failed to reach the semifinal.

In Doubles, in the first match Kubot/Marach outlasted Mirnyi/Ram in a marathon 4–6, 6–4, [16–14] to advance in the top spot. The second match saw the Bryans eliminated Dlouhý/Paes.

Matches on O_{2} arena
Group	Winner	Loser	Score
Doubles – Group B	(Poland) Łukasz Kubot [6] (Austria) Oliver Marach [6]	(Belarus) Max Mirnyi [7] (Israel) Andy Ram [7]	4–6, 6–4, [16–14]
Singles – Group B	(Sweden) Robin Söderling [8]	(Serbia) Novak Djokovic [3]	7–6^{(7–5)}, 6–1
Doubles – Group B	(United States) Bob Bryan [2] (United States) Mike Bryan [2]	(Czech Republic) Lukáš Dlouhý [4] (India) Leander Paes [4]	6–3, 6–4
Singles – Group B	(Russia) Nikolay Davydenko [6]	(Spain) Rafael Nadal [2]	6–1, 7–6^{(7–4)}
1st match starts at 12:30 pm, 2nd at 2:15 pm, 3rd at 7:00 pm and 4th at 8:45 pm

=== Day 5: 26 November 2009 ===
Murray played Verdasco, hoping for a straight set shot through to the semi-final, leaving Federer and Del Potro to fight for the other spot. A loss for Murray would eliminate him. And a three-set win required a complicated tie break.

In the first eight games, Murray failed to convert multiple break points. In the ninth game, Murray finally succeeded and served it out for 6–4. Verdasco saved break points in the fifth game for 3–2. Verdasco saved two more break points in the 11th game, leading to a tie-break. Verdasco won the early lead 4–2 but Murray recovered to reach 4–5 on serve. Verdasco won the next point before Murray double faulted to give Verdasco the set. In the third Verdaso save the only break point in the second. Verdasco double faulted to give Murray a 4–2 lead who held on to win the breaker 7–3.

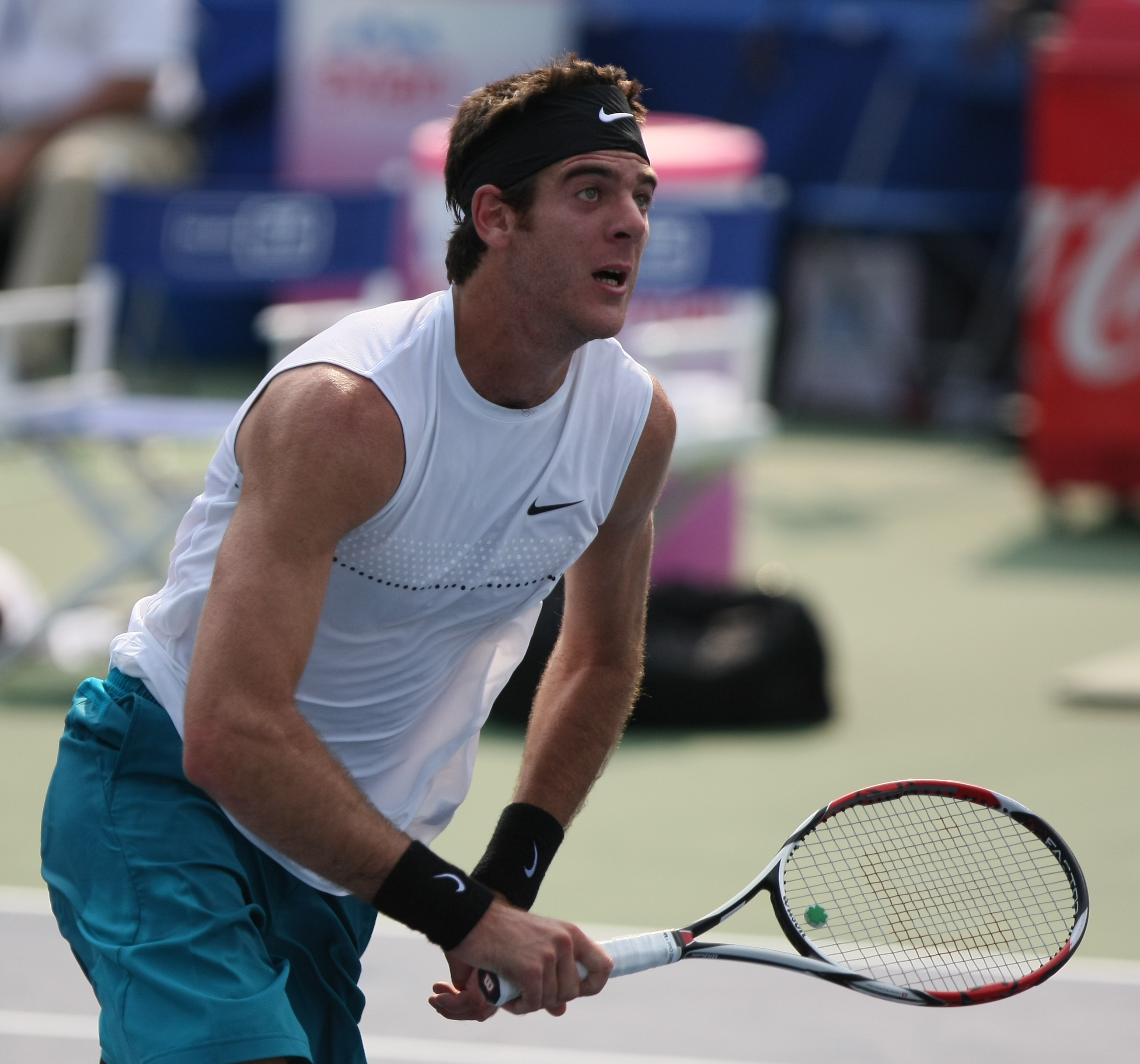
Juan Martín del Potro advance to the semifinals with Federer

The last match repeated US Open final as Federer took on del Potro. Del Potro broke in the 1st and 5th games thanks to a Federer double fault, winning the opening set 6–2. Federer saved a break point in the next game, eventually reaching a tie break. Del Potro claimed a 4–2 lead, but Federer fought back to win 7–5. That put Federer into the semi-final. Murray needed Federer to win four games in the final set for him to advance but Federer did not oblige. At 4–3 Federer went down 0–40. He saved one break point but del Potro got the next and closed out the match 6–3.

Murray was thereby out, with Federer and del Potro advancing. The three players won the same number of matches and leaving it to game percentage. All of the Group A matches went three sets.

In the doubles Nestor/Zimonjić were eliminated despite claiming their first victory over Bhupathi/Knowles at 6–4, 7–6. The second match saw Čermák/Mertiňák move on by defeating Fyrstenberg/Matkowski, finishing second in the group.

Matches on O_{2} arena
Group	Winner	Loser	Score
Doubles – Group A	(Canada) Daniel Nestor [1] (Serbia) Nenad Zimonjić [1]	(India) Mahesh Bhupathi [3] (The Bahamas) Mark Knowles [3]	6–4, 7–6^{(11–9)}
Singles – Group A	(United Kingdom) Andy Murray [4]	(Spain) Fernando Verdasco [7]	6–4, 6–7^{(4–7)}, 7–6^{(7–3)}
Doubles – Group A	(Czech Republic) František Čermák [5] (Slovakia) Michal Mertiňák [5]	(Poland) Mariusz Fyrstenberg [8] (Poland) Marcin Matkowski [8]	6–4, 6–4
Singles – Group A	(Argentina) Juan Martín del Potro [5]	(Switzerland) Roger Federer [1]	6–2, 6–7^{(5–7)}, 6–3
1st match starts at 12:30 pm, 2nd at 2:15 pm, 3rd at 7:00 pm and 4th at 8:45 pm

=== Day 6: 27 November 2009 ===
Nadal began the day by taking on Djokovic. Djokovic broke in the opening game. Nadal struck back in the next game after Djokovic saved two break points. In the third game, Djokovic broke again. In the next game, Djokovic held, taking a 3–1 lead. Nadal held and then broke. Both players then held to force a tie-break. Djokovic took the mini-break to lead 4–2 and held on for 7–5. Djokovic broke for the fourth time, gaining a 3–1 lead. Djokovic took the match at 6–3.

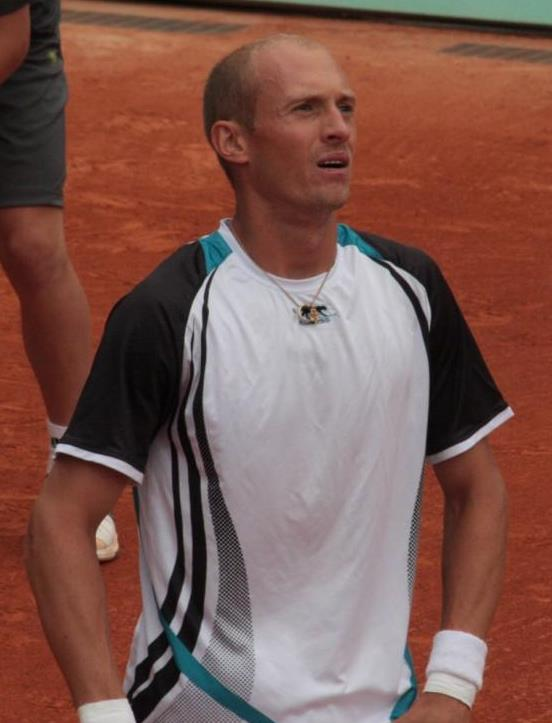
Nikolay Davydenko advances to the semifinals with victory over Söderling

Söderling still had to battle Davydenko, who was trying to claim the second semifinal berth. In the 7th game Davydenko failed to convert break points, as did Söderling in the next 8th, eventually leading to a tie break. There were no mini-breaks until the changeover, which was followed by three straight, giving Davydeno the set 7–4. In the 9th game of the second set Söderling broke at love and won the set 6–4, giving him the top spot in Group B. At 3–2 in the final set Davydenko broke to lead 5–2. Söderling held. At 5–3 with two match points, Davydenko double-faulted, but converted the next match point to win 6–3. This win meant that Davydenko would face Federer, becoming the only 2008 singles semifinalist to go through to the 2009 semifinals.

In doubles, Dlouhý/Paes lost their final round robin match to Mirnyi/Ram 7–6, 6–4. Then the Bryans had to win their match against Kubot/Marach in straight sets to reach the semi-final, which they did 6–3, 6–4.

Matches on O_{2} arena
Group	Winner	Loser	Score
Doubles – Group B	(Belarus) Max Mirnyi [7] (Israel) Andy Ram [7]	(Czech Republic) Lukáš Dlouhý [4] (India) Leander Paes [4]	7–6^{(7–1)}, 6–4
Singles – Group B	(Serbia) Novak Djokovic [3]	(Spain) Rafael Nadal [2]	7–6^{(7–5)}, 6–3
Doubles – Group B	(United States) Bob Bryan [2] (United States) Mike Bryan [2]	(Poland) Łukasz Kubot [6] (Austria) Oliver Marach [6]	6–3, 6–4
Singles – Group B	(Russia) Nikolay Davydenko [6]	(Sweden) Robin Söderling [8]	7–6^{(7–4)}, 4–6, 6–3
1st match starts at 12:30 pm, 2nd at 2:15 pm, 3rd at 7:00 pm and 4th at 8:45 pm

=== Day 7: 28 November 2009 ===
Play began between Federer and last year's runner-up Davydenko. Federer had won all 12 prior encounters. Davydenko saved two early break points. In the next game. Davydenko broke, then held and broke again at love. Federer broke back immediately for 2–4. Federer saved only one of two break points, for a third consecutive break. Davydenko held for 6–2. At 5–5, Davydenko converted a break point and in the next game saved one of his own before serving it out in his first win over Federer.

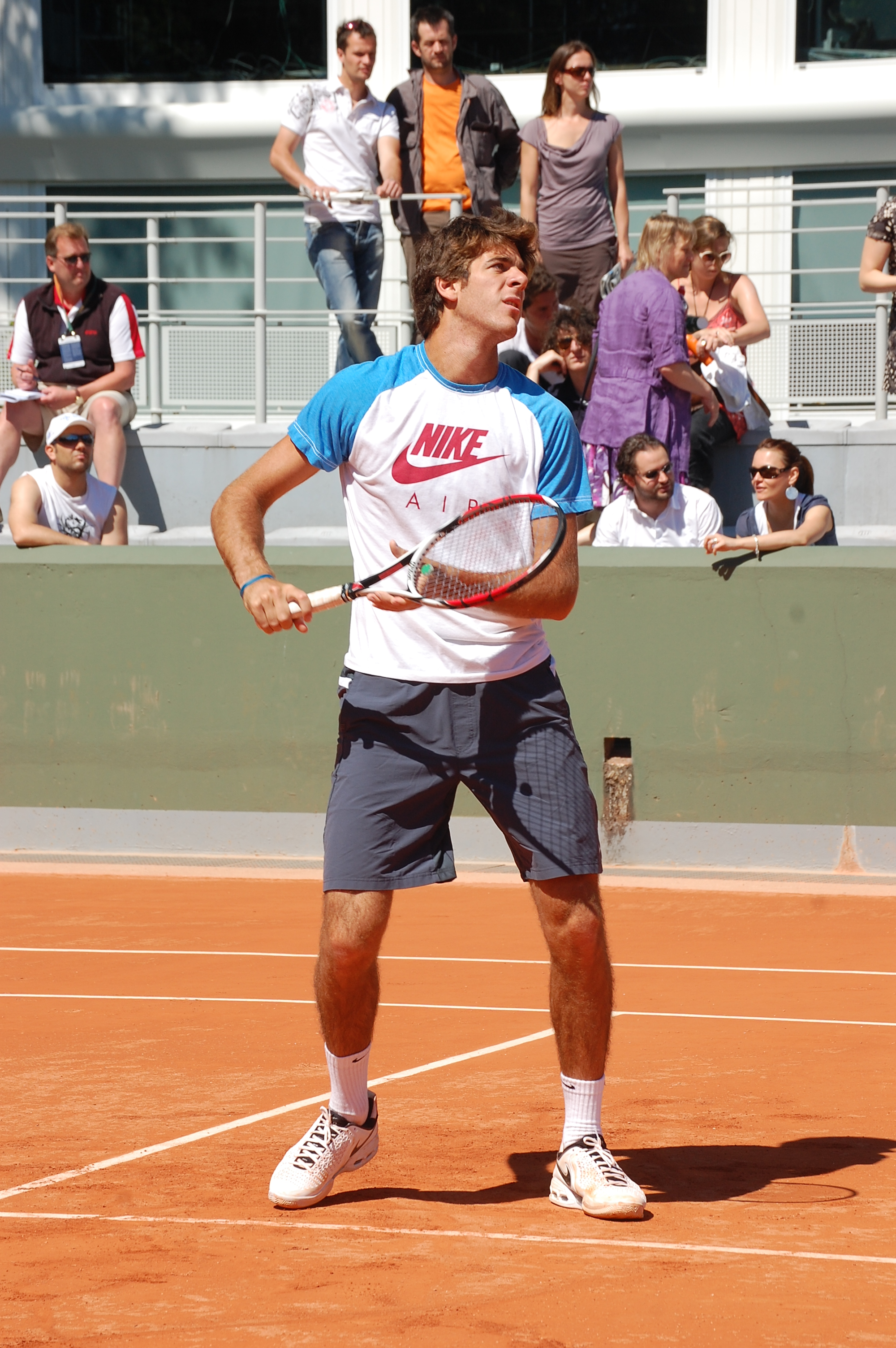
Juan Martín del Potro the third Argentine to reach the year-end finals

In the evening semifinal, Söderling played del Potro, having split their last two meetings. In the third game, Söderling saved three break points from 0–40 for 2–1. Both players continued to hold, creating a tie-break. Söderling went up 5–0, before winning it 7–1. At 4–3 in the second set, del Potro broke Söderling and held on for 6–3. The third set saw Söderling break to lead 4–2 and del Potro break for 4–3. From there, both players held. In the tie-break, del Potro went up 4–0 lead and won 7–3.

Mirnyi/Ram defeated Čermák/Mertiňák 6–4, 7–6 to reach the finals. Then, there was an Australian Open final rematch pitting the Bryans against Bhupathi/Knowles. The result was the same, with the Bryan twins taking it 6–4, 6–4.

Matches on O_{2} arena
Group	Winner	Loser	Score
Doubles – Semifinals	(Belarus) Max Mirnyi [7] (Israel) Andy Ram [7]	(Czech Republic) František Čermák [5] (Slovakia) Michal Mertiňák [5]	6–4, 7–6^{(7–4)}
Singles – Semifinals	(Russia) Nikolay Davydenko [6]	(Switzerland) Roger Federer [1]	6–2, 4–6, 7–5
Doubles – Semifinals	(United States) Bob Bryan [2] (United States) Mike Bryan [2]	(India) Mahesh Bhupathi [3] (The Bahamas) Mark Knowles [3]	6–4, 6–4
Singles – Semifinals	(Argentina) Juan Martín del Potro [5]	(Sweden) Robin Söderling [8]	6–7^{(1–7)}, 6–3, 7–6^{(7–3)}
1st match starts at 12:30 pm, 2nd at 2:15 pm, 3rd at 7:00 pm and 4th at 8:45 pm

=== Day 8: 29 November 2009 ===
The Bryans got a first set chest bump after taking the first set point on a down-the-middle backhand. A single break in game eight of the second set was enough for the brothers to serve for the match. The pair thrilled to have regained the title and the top ranking.

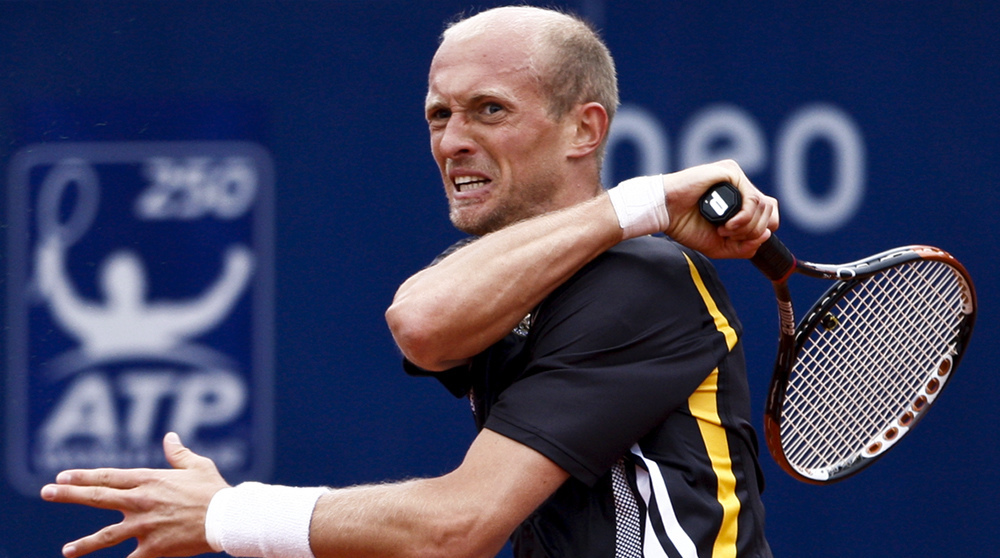
Nikolay Davydenko is the first Russian player to win the year-end championships

Finally, del Potro and Davydenko having both defeated Soderling, Federer, and one Spaniard along the way faced off. This was their fourth meeting, with Davydenko leading 2–1. Davydenko broke at his second chance and then easily served out the set. In the second set at 2–2, del Potro saved a break point. Davydenko did the same, for 3–3. At 4–4 Davydenko broke at love. Davydenko then served the match out for a 6–3, 6–4 win. This was Davydenko's biggest title to date.

Del Potro commented "Congratulations Nikolay, you had a great week, you beat everyone and you're a great champion. Thank you the crowd, you support me a lot and helped me. I hope to see you next year." Davydenko added; "Yeah!... I just want to congratulate Martin: he had a big season. For me it was amazing, coming in as number seven and winning the tournament. I surprised myself. Maybe I now have English fans... I hope. I really enjoy coming to London, I will try to come back again." He also added "Trophy, it's always something important, you know, in career for the tennis player. Something important for me because Federer I beat in semifinals. It was a great match, good feeling. Never beat him before. And beat him once here in semifinals. But, you know, finals different".

Matches on O_{2} arena
Group	Champion	Runner-up	Score
Doubles – Final	(United States) Bob Bryan [2] (United States) Mike Bryan [2]	(Belarus) Max Mirnyi [7] (Israel) Andy Ram [7]	7–6^{(7–5)}, 6–3
Singles – Final	(Russia) Nikolay Davydenko [6]	(Argentina) Juan Martín del Potro [5]	6–3, 6–4
1st match starts at 12:30 pm, 2nd at 2:30 pm
