= 2009 BNP Paribas Masters – Doubles =

Doubles
- 2009 BNP Paribas Masters

Final
- Champions: (Canada) Daniel Nestor (Serbia) Nenad Zimonjić
- Runners-up: (Spain) Marcel Granollers (Spain) Tommy Robredo
- Score: 6–3, 6–4

Details
- Draw: 24
- Seeds: 8

Events
Singles	Doubles
← 2008 ·	BNP Paribas Masters	· 2010 →

Jonas Björkman & Kevin Ullyett were the defending champions, but Björkman retired in 2008.
Ullyett teamed up with Bruno Soares, but they lost in the second round against František Čermák and Michal Mertiňák.
Daniel Nestor and Nenad Zimonjić won in the final 6–3, 6–4, against Marcel Granollers and Tommy Robredo.
With this win, Nestor completed a Career Golden Masters, having won all nine ATP Tour Masters 1000 events. He was the first player to do so.

== Seeds ==
All seeds receive a bye into the second round

1. (Canada) Daniel Nestor / (Serbia) Nenad Zimonjić (champions)
2. (United States) Bob Bryan / (United States) Mike Bryan (quarterfinals)
3. (India) Mahesh Bhupathi / (The Bahamas) Mark Knowles (second round)
4. (Czech Republic) Lukáš Dlouhý / (India) Leander Paes (second round)
5. (South Africa) Wesley Moodie / (Belgium) Dick Norman (second round)
6. (Austria) Julian Knowle / (Israel) Andy Ram (second round)
7. (Poland) Mariusz Fyrstenberg / (Poland) Marcin Matkowski (semifinals)
8. (Czech Republic) František Čermák / (Slovakia) Michal Mertiňák (semifinals)

== Draw ==
=== Key ===
- Q = Qualifier
- WC = Wild card
- LL = Lucky loser
- Alt = Alternate
- SE = Special exempt
- PR = Protected ranking
- ITF = ITF entry
- JE = Junior exempt
- w/o = Walkover
- r = Retired
- d = Defaulted
- SR = Special ranking

=== Finals ===
Semifinals
1	(Canada) Daniel Nestor (Serbia) Nenad Zimonjić	6^{2}	6	[10]
8	(Czech Republic) František Čermák (Slovakia) Michal Mertiňák	7	4	[2]
(Spain) Marcel Granollers (Spain) Tommy Robredo	6	6
7	(Poland) Mariusz Fyrstenberg (Poland) Marcin Matkowski	4	2

Final
1	(Canada) Daniel Nestor (Serbia) Nenad Zimonjić	6	6
(Spain) Marcel Granollers (Spain) Tommy Robredo	3	4

=== Top half ===
First round
(Czech Republic) J Levinský (Slovakia) F Polášek	6	1	[4]
WC	(France) A Clément (France) M Llodra	3	6	[10]
(Germany) C Kas (Germany) P Kohlschreiber	4	7	[15]
(Argentina) J Mónaco (Spain) R Nadal	6	5	[13]
(Australia) J Kerr (United States) T Parrott	6	6
(Czech Republic) M Damm (Israel) J Erlich	3	4
(Uruguay) P Cuevas (Austria) O Marach	1	6^{6}
(Brazil) B Soares (Zimbabwe) K Ullyett	6	7

Second round
1	(Canada) D Nestor (Serbia) N Zimonjić	6	6
WC	(France) A Clément (France) M Llodra	3	4
(Germany) C Kas (Germany) P Kohlschreiber	7	6
6	(Austria) J Knowle (Israel) A Ram	5	4
4	(Czech Republic) L Dlouhý (India) L Paes	7	4	[5]
(Australia) J Kerr (United States) T Parrott	6^{5}	6	[10]
(Brazil) B Soares (Zimbabwe) K Ullyett	3	4
8	(Czech Republic) F Čermák (Slovakia) M Mertiňák	6	6

Quarterfinals
1	(Canada) D Nestor (Serbia) N Zimonjić	6	7
(Germany) C Kas (Germany) P Kohlschreiber	3	6^{3}
(Australia) J Kerr (United States) T Parrott	2	4
8	(Czech Republic) F Čermák (Slovakia) M Mertiňák	6	6

Semifinals
1	(Canada) D Nestor (Serbia) N Zimonjić	6^{2}	6	[10]
8	(Czech Republic) F Čermák (Slovakia) M Mertiňák	7	4	[2]

=== Bottom half ===
First round
(Spain) M Granollers (Spain) T Robredo	7	6
(Argentina) JM del Potro (Chile) F González	6^{2}	2
(France) J Chardy (France) G Simon	4	6	[7]
(Sweden) S Aspelin (Australia) P Hanley	6	3	[10]
WC	(France) S Grosjean (France) F Santoro	3	6	[5]
(Sweden) J Brunström (Netherlands Antilles) J-J Rojer	6	3	[10]
(France) J Benneteau (France) J-W Tsonga	6	6
(South Africa) J Coetzee (Brazil) M Melo	3	4

Second round
5	(South Africa) W Moodie (Belgium) D Norman	4	5
(Spain) M Granollers (Spain) T Robredo	6	7
(Sweden) S Aspelin (Australia) P Hanley	6	6^{6}	[10]
3	(India) M Bhupathi (The Bahamas) M Knowles	4	7	[7]
7	(Poland) M Fyrstenberg (Poland) M Matkowski	6	7
(Sweden) J Brunström (Netherlands Antilles) J-J Rojer	4	6^{5}
(France) J Benneteau (France) J-W Tsonga
2	(United States) B Bryan (United States) M Bryan	w/o

Quarterfinals
(Spain) M Granollers (Spain) T Robredo	6	6^{3}	[10]
(Sweden) S Aspelin (Australia) P Hanley	3	7	[7]
7	(Poland) M Fyrstenberg (Poland) M Matkowski	6	7
2	(United States) B Bryan (United States) M Bryan	4	6^{7}

Semifinals
(Spain) M Granollers (Spain) T Robredo	6	6
7	(Poland) M Fyrstenberg (Poland) M Matkowski	4	2
