= 2009 ATP World Tour Finals – Doubles =

Doubles
- 2009 ATP World Tour Finals

Final
- Champions: (United States) Bob Bryan (United States) Mike Bryan
- Runners-up: (Belarus) Max Mirnyi (Israel) Andy Ram
- Score: 7–6^{(7–5)}, 6–3

Events
Singles	Doubles
← 2008 ·	ATP World Tour Finals	· 2010 →

Bob and Mike Bryan defeated Max Mirnyi and Andy Ram in the final, 7–6^{(7–5)}, 6–3 to win the doubles tennis title at the 2009 ATP World Tour Finals. It was their third Tour Finals title.

Daniel Nestor and Nenad Zimonjić were the defending champions, but were eliminated in the round-robin stage.

== Seeds ==
1. (Canada) Daniel Nestor / (Serbia) Nenad Zimonjić (round robin)
2. (United States) Bob Bryan / (United States) Mike Bryan (champions)
3. (India) Mahesh Bhupathi / (The Bahamas) Mark Knowles (semifinals)
4. (Czech Republic) Lukáš Dlouhý / (India) Leander Paes (round robin)
5. (Czech Republic) František Čermák / (Slovakia) Michal Mertiňák (semifinals)
6. (Poland) Łukasz Kubot / (Austria) Oliver Marach (round robin)
7. (Belarus) Max Mirnyi / (Israel) Andy Ram (final)
8. (Poland) Mariusz Fyrstenberg / (Poland) Marcin Matkowski (round robin)

== Draw ==
=== Key ===
- Q = Qualifier
- WC = Wild card
- LL = Lucky loser
- Alt = Alternate
- SE = Special exempt
- PR = Protected ranking
- ITF = ITF entry
- JE = Junior exempt
- w/o = Walkover
- r = Retired
- d = Defaulted
- SR = Special ranking

=== Finals ===
Semifinals
3	(India) Mahesh Bhupathi (The Bahamas) Mark Knowles	4	4
2	(United States) Bob Bryan (United States) Mike Bryan	6	6
7	(Belarus) Max Mirnyi (Israel) Andy Ram	6	7^{7}
5	(Czech Republic) František Čermák (Slovakia) Michal Mertiňák	4	6^{4}

Final
2	(United States) Bob Bryan (United States) Mike Bryan	7^{7}	6
7	(Belarus) Max Mirnyi (Israel) Andy Ram	6^{5}	3

=== Group A ===
		(Canada) Nestor (Serbia) Zimonjić	(India) Bhupathi (The Bahamas) Knowles	(Czech Republic) Čermák (Slovakia) Mertiňák	(Poland) Fyrstenberg (Poland) Matkowski	RR; W–L	Set; W–L	Game; W–L	Standings
1	(Canada) Daniel Nestor (Serbia) Nenad Zimonjić		6–4, 7–6^{(11–9)}	3–6, 4–6	4–6, 4–6	1–2	2–4	28–34	4
3	(India) Mahesh Bhupathi (The Bahamas) Mark Knowles	4–6, 6–7^{(9–11)}		6–3, 6–3	3–6, 6–3, [10–7]	2–1	4–3	32–28	1
5	(Czech Republic) František Čermák (Slovakia) Michal Mertiňák	6–3, 6–4	3–6, 3–6		6–4, 6–4	2–1	4–2	30–27	2
8	(Poland) Mariusz Fyrstenberg (Poland) Marcin Matkowski	6–4, 6–4	6–3, 3–6, [7–10]	4–6, 4–6		1–2	3–4	29–30	3

Standings are determined by: 1. number of wins; 2. number of matches; 3. in two-players-ties, head-to-head records; 4. in three-players-ties, percentage of sets won, or of games won; 5. steering-committee decision.

=== Group B ===
		(United States) Bryan (United States) Bryan	(Czech Republic) Dlouhý (India) Paes	(Poland) Kubot (Austria) Marach	(Belarus) Mirnyi (Israel) Ram	RR; W–L	Set; W–L	Game; W–L	Standings
2	(United States) Bob Bryan (United States) Mike Bryan		6–3, 6–4	6–3, 6–4	4–6, 4–6	2–1	4–2	32–26	2
4	(Czech Republic) Lukáš Dlouhý (India) Leander Paes	3–6, 4–6		4–6, 6–7^{(3–7)}	6–7^{(1–7)}, 4–6	0–3	0–6	27–38	4
6	(Poland) Łukasz Kubot (Austria) Oliver Marach	3–6, 4–6	6–4, 7–6^{(7–3)}		4–6, 6–4, [16–14]	2–1	4–3	31–32	3
7	(Belarus) Max Mirnyi (Israel) Andy Ram	6–4, 6–4	7–6^{(7–1)}, 6–4	6–4, 4–6, [14–16]		2–1	5–2	35–29	1

Standings are determined by: 1. number of wins; 2. number of matches; 3. in two-players-ties, head-to-head records; 4. in three-players-ties, percentage of sets won, or of games won; 5. steering-committee decision.
