= 2009 ATP World Tour Finals – Singles =

Singles
- 2009 ATP World Tour Finals

Final
- Champion: (Russia) Nikolay Davydenko
- Runner-up: (Argentina) Juan Martín del Potro
- Score: 6–3, 6–4

Events
Singles	Doubles
← 2008 ·	ATP World Tour Finals	· 2010 →

Nikolay Davydenko defeated Juan Martín del Potro in the final, 6–3, 6–4 to win the singles tennis title at the 2009 ATP World Tour Finals.

Novak Djokovic was the defending champion, but was eliminated in the round-robin stage.

Fernando Verdasco and Robin Söderling made their debuts at the event.

Andy Roddick qualified for the tournament, but withdrew due to a left leg injury, where he was replaced by Söderling.

== Seeds ==
1. (Switzerland) Roger Federer (semifinals)
2. (Spain) Rafael Nadal (round robin)
3. (Serbia) Novak Djokovic (round robin)
4. (United Kingdom) Andy Murray (round robin)
5. (Argentina) Juan Martín del Potro (final)
6. (Russia) Nikolay Davydenko (champion)
7. (Spain) Fernando Verdasco (round robin)
8. (Sweden) Robin Söderling (semifinals)

== Alternates ==
1. (France) Jo-Wilfried Tsonga (Did not play)
2. (Croatia) Ivan Ljubičić (Did not play)

== Draw ==
=== Key ===
- Q = Qualifier
- WC = Wild card
- LL = Lucky loser
- Alt = Alternate
- SE = Special exempt
- PR = Protected ranking
- ITF = ITF entry
- JE = Junior exempt
- w/o = Walkover
- r = Retired
- d = Defaulted
- SR = Special ranking

=== Finals ===
Semifinals
1	(Switzerland) Roger Federer	2	6	5
6	(Russia) Nikolay Davydenko	6	4	7
8	(Sweden) Robin Söderling	7^{7}	3	6^{3}
5	(Argentina) Juan Martín del Potro	6^{1}	6	7^{7}

Final
6	(Russia) Nikolay Davydenko	6	6
5	(Argentina) Juan Martín del Potro	3	4

=== Group A ===
		(Switzerland) Federer	(United Kingdom) Murray	(Argentina) del Potro	(Spain) Verdasco	RR W–L	Set W–L	Game W–L	Standings
1	(Switzerland) Roger Federer		3–6, 6–3, 6–1	2–6, 7–6^{(7–5)}, 3–6	4–6, 7–5, 6–1	2–1	5–4 (55.6%)	44–40 (52.4%)	1
4	(United Kingdom) Andy Murray	6–3, 3–6, 1–6		6–3, 3–6, 6–2	6–4, 6–7^{(4–7)}, 7–6^{(7–3)}	2–1	5–4 (55.6%)	44–43 (50.6%)	3
5	(Argentina) Juan Martín del Potro	6–2, 6–7^{(5–7)}, 6–3	3–6, 6–3, 2–6		6–4, 3–6, 7–6^{(7–1)}	2–1	5–4 (55.6%)	45–43 (51.1%)	2
7	(Spain) Fernando Verdasco	6–4, 5–7, 1–6	4–6, 7–6^{(7–4)}, 6–7^{(3–7)}	4–6, 6–3, 6–7^{(1–7)}		0–3	3–6 (33.3%)	45–52 (46.4%)	4

Standings are determined by: 1. number of wins; 2. number of matches; 3. in two-players-ties, head-to-head records; 4. in three-players-ties, percentage of sets won, or of games won; 5. steering-committee decision.

=== Group B ===
		(Spain) Nadal	(Serbia) Djokovic	(Russia) Davydenko	(Sweden) Söderling	RR W–L	Set W–L	Game W–L	Standings
2	(Spain) Rafael Nadal		6–7^{(5–7)}, 3–6	1–6, 6–7^{(4–7)}	4–6, 4–6	0–3	0–6 (0.0%)	24–38 (38.7%)	4
3	(Serbia) Novak Djokovic	7–6^{(7–5)}, 6–3		3–6, 6–4, 7–5	6–7^{(5–7)}, 1–6	2–1	4–3 (57.1%)	36–37 (49.3%)	3
6	(Russia) Nikolay Davydenko	6–1, 7–6^{(7–4)}	6–3, 4–6, 5–7		7–6^{(7–4)}, 4–6, 6–3	2–1	5–3 (62.5%)	45–38 (54.2%)	2
8	(Sweden) Robin Söderling	6–4, 6–4	7–6^{(7–5)}, 6–1	6–7^{(4–7)}, 6–4, 3–6		2–1	5–2 (71.4%)	40–32 (55.6%)	1

Standings are determined by: 1. number of wins; 2. number of matches; 3. in two-players-ties, head-to-head records; 4. in three-players-ties, percentage of sets won, or of games won; 5. steering-committee decision.

== See also ==
- ATP World Tour Finals appearances
