= 2009 BNP Paribas Masters – Singles =

Singles
- 2009 BNP Paribas Masters

Final
- Champion: (Serbia) Novak Djokovic
- Runner-up: (France) Gaël Monfils
- Score: 6–2, 5–7, 7–6^{(7–3)}

Details
- Draw: 48 (6 Q / 3 WC)
- Seeds: 16

Events
Singles	Doubles
← 2008 ·	BNP Paribas Masters	· 2010 →

Novak Djokovic defeated Gaël Monfils in the final, 6–2, 5–7, 7–6^{(7–3)} to win the singles tennis title at the 2009 Paris Masters. It was his first Paris Masters title, and the first of an eventual record seven titles at the event.

Jo-Wilfried Tsonga was the defending champion, but lost to Rafael Nadal in the quarterfinals.

This was the last professional appearance for former world No. 1, two-time major champion, and three-time Paris Masters champion Marat Safin; he lost in the second round to Juan Martín del Potro.

== Seeds ==
All seeds receive a bye into the second round.

1. (Switzerland) Roger Federer (second round)
2. (Spain) Rafael Nadal (semifinals)
3. (Serbia) Novak Djokovic (champion)
4. (United Kingdom) Andy Murray (third round)
5. (Argentina) Juan Martín del Potro (quarterfinals, retired)
6. (Russia) Nikolay Davydenko (third round)
7. (Spain) Fernando Verdasco (third round)
8. (France) Jo-Wilfried Tsonga (quarterfinals)
9. (Sweden) Robin Söderling (quarterfinals)
10. (Chile) Fernando González (third round, retired)
11. (France) Gilles Simon (third round)
12. (Croatia) Marin Čilić (quarterfinals)
13. (Czech Republic) Radek Štěpánek (semifinals)
14. (Spain) Tommy Robredo (third round)
15. (France) Gaël Monfils (final)
16. (Germany) Tommy Haas (second round)

== Draw ==
=== Key ===
- Q = Qualifier
- WC = Wild card
- LL = Lucky loser
- Alt = Alternate
- SE = Special exempt
- PR = Protected ranking
- ITF = ITF entry
- JE = Junior exempt
- w/o = Walkover
- r = Retired
- d = Defaulted
- SR = Special ranking

=== Finals ===
Quarterfinals
15	(France) Gaël Monfils	3	6	6
12	(Croatia) Marin Čilić	6	4	4
13	(Czech Republic) Radek Štěpánek	4
5	(Argentina) Juan Martín del Potro	0^{r}
9	(Sweden) Robin Söderling	4	6	3
3	(Serbia) Novak Djokovic	6	1	6
8	(France) Jo-Wilfried Tsonga	5	5
2	(Spain) Rafael Nadal	7	7

Semifinals
15	(France) Gaël Monfils	6	5	6
13	(Czech Republic) Radek Štěpánek	4	7	4
3	(Serbia) Novak Djokovic	6	6
2	(Spain) Rafael Nadal	2	3

Final
15	(France) Gaël Monfils	2	7	6^{3}
3	(Serbia) Novak Djokovic	6	5	7^{7}

=== Top half ===
==== Section 1 ====
First round
(France) J Benneteau	4	7	6
(Germany) P Petzschner	6	5	3
(Switzerland) S Wawrinka	3	4
Q	(France) D Guez	6	6
(Germany) A Beck	4	6	4
Q	(Poland) Ł Kubot	6	3	6
(Germany) P Kohlschreiber	3	3
(Italy) A Seppi	6	6

Second round
1	(Switzerland) R Federer	6	6^{4}	4
(France) J Benneteau	3	7^{7}	6
Q	(France) D Guez	4	5
15	(France) G Monfils	6	7
12	(Croatia) M Čilić	6^{3}	6	6
Q	(Poland) Ł Kubot	7^{7}	4	2
(Italy) A Seppi	7^{7}	4	4
7	(Spain) F Verdasco	6^{3}	6	6

Third round
(France) J Benneteau	4	3
15	(France) G Monfils	6	6
12	(Croatia) M Čilić	3	6	6
7	(Spain) F Verdasco	6	3	4

Quarterfinals
15	(France) G Monfils	3	6	6
12	(Croatia) M Čilić	6	4	4

==== Section 2 ====
First round
(United States) J Blake	6	6
(France) F Santoro	4	3
(France) P-H Mathieu	6^{4}	0^{r}
(Serbia) V Troicki	7^{7}	3
Q	(Colombia) A Falla	6	6^{10}	5
(United States) J Isner	4	7^{12}	7
Q	(France) T Ascione	4	6	6^{3}
WC	(Russia) M Safin	6	4	7^{7}

Second round
4	(United Kingdom) A Murray	6	6^{5}	7^{7}
(United States) J Blake	3	7^{7}	6^{4}
(Serbia) V Troicki	4	0
13	(Czech Republic) R Štěpánek	6	6
10	(Chile) F González	7	7
(United States) J Isner	5	6^{3}
WC	(Russia) M Safin	4	7	4
5	(Argentina) JM del Potro	6	5	6

Third round
4	(United Kingdom) A Murray	6	3	4
13	(Czech Republic) R Štěpánek	1	6	6
10	(Chile) F González	7^{8}	6^{6}	r
5	(Argentina) JM del Potro	6^{6}	7^{8}

Quarterfinals
13	(Czech Republic) R Štěpánek	4
5	(Argentina) JM del Potro	0^{r}

=== Bottom half ===
==== Section 3 ====
First round
WC	(France) M Llodra	6	2	3
(Germany) B Becker	3	6	6
(Uruguay) P Cuevas	6^{3}	4
(Croatia) I Karlović	7^{7}	6
(Spain) F López	3	1
Q	(France) A Clément	6	6
(France) J Chardy	6^{6}	5
(Argentina) J Mónaco	7^{8}	7

Second round
6	(Russia) N Davydenko	6	6
(Germany) B Becker	2	1
(Croatia) I Karlović	4	6^{6}
9	(Sweden) R Söderling	6	7^{8}
16	(Germany) T Haas	7	3	6^{8}
Q	(France) A Clément	5	6	7^{10}
(Argentina) J Mónaco	3	5
3	(Serbia) N Djokovic	6	7

Third round
6	(Russia) N Davydenko	3	6	4
9	(Sweden) R Söderling	6	3	6
Q	(France) A Clément	2	2
3	(Serbia) N Djokovic	6	6

Quarterfinals
9	(Sweden) R Söderling	4	6	3
3	(Serbia) N Djokovic	6	1	6

==== Section 4 ====
First round
(Romania) V Hănescu	6	3	6^{3}
(Spain) A Montañés	3	6	7^{7}
WC	(France) S Grosjean	6^{2}	4
(Croatia) I Ljubičić	7^{7}	6
(Czech Republic) T Berdych	6	7^{7}
Q	(France) V Millot	3	6^{4}
(Spain) N Almagro	6	6
SE	(Switzerland) M Chiudinelli	2	4

Second round
8	(France) J-W Tsonga	6	7
(Spain) A Montañés	1	5
(Croatia) I Ljubičić	3	6	6^{4}
11	(France) G Simon	6	3	7^{7}
14	(Spain) T Robredo	6	6
(Czech Republic) T Berdych	4	4
(Spain) N Almagro	6	6^{2}	5
2	(Spain) R Nadal	3	7^{7}	7

Third round
8	(France) J-W Tsonga	6	6
11	(France) G Simon	2	3
14	(Spain) T Robredo	3	6	5
2	(Spain) R Nadal	6	3	7

Quarterfinals
8	(France) J-W Tsonga	5	5
2	(Spain) R Nadal	7	7

== Qualifying ==
=== Seeds ===
1. (Ukraine) Sergiy Stakhovsky (qualifying competition, retired)
2. (France) Marc Gicquel (qualifying competition)
3. (Portugal) Fred Gil (qualifying competition)
4. (France) Florent Serra (qualifying competition)
5. (Australia) Peter Luczak (first round)
6. (Latvia) Ernests Gulbis (first round, withdrew)
7. (France) Arnaud Clément (qualified)
8. (Italy) Simone Bolelli (first round)
9. (Colombia) Alejandro Falla (qualified)
10. (Russia) Teymuraz Gabashvili (first round)
11. (Poland) Łukasz Kubot (qualified)
12. (United States) Robert Kendrick (first round)

=== Qualifiers ===
1. (France) Arnaud Clément
2. (Colombia) Alejandro Falla
3. (France) Vincent Millot
4. (Poland) Łukasz Kubot
5. (France) David Guez
6. (France) Thierry Ascione

=== Draw ===
==== First qualifier ====
First round
1	(Ukraine) Sergiy Stakhovsky	7^{7}	3	7^{7}
(France) Josselin Ouanna	6^{4}	6	6^{5}
WC	(France) Jonathan Dasnières de Veigy	6^{0}	1
7	(France) Arnaud Clément	7^{7}	6

Qualifying competition
1	(Ukraine) Sergiy Stakhovsky	6^{r}
7	(France) Arnaud Clément	5

==== Second qualifier ====
First round
2	(France) Marc Gicquel	6	6
WC	(France) Édouard Roger-Vasselin	4	4
(Andorra) Laurent Recouderc	3	3
9	(Colombia) Alejandro Falla	6	6

Qualifying competition
2	(France) Marc Gicquel	3	7	6^{6}
9	(Colombia) Alejandro Falla	6	5	7^{8}

==== Third qualifier ====
First round
3	(Portugal) Fred Gil	6	6^{4}	7
(Spain) Alberto Martín	4	7^{7}	5
Alt	(France) Vincent Millot	6^{5}	6	6
8	(Italy) Simone Bolelli	7^{7}	4	3

Qualifying competition
3	(Portugal) Fred Gil	4	6	2
Alt	(France) Vincent Millot	6	3	6

==== Fourth qualifier ====
First round
4	(France) Florent Serra	w/o
(Morocco) Lamine Ouahab
(Germany) Michael Berrer	7	4	6^{4}
11	(Poland) Łukasz Kubot	5	6	7^{7}

Qualifying competition
4	(France) Florent Serra	3	6	3
11	(Poland) Łukasz Kubot	6	2	6

==== Fifth qualifier ====
First round
5	(Australia) Peter Luczak	4	4
(Spain) Iván Navarro	6	6
WC	(France) David Guez	6	6
12	(United States) Robert Kendrick	3	4

Qualifying competition
(Spain) Iván Navarro	3	4
WC	(France) David Guez	6	6

==== Sixth qualifier ====
First round
6	(Latvia) Ernests Gulbis
Alt	(France) Mathieu Rodrigues	w/o
WC	(France) Thierry Ascione	6	6
10	(Russia) Teymuraz Gabashvili	2	1

Qualifying competition
Alt	(France) Mathieu Rodrigues	2	1
WC	(France) Thierry Ascione	6	6
