= 2008 BNP Paribas Masters – Doubles =

Doubles
- 2008 BNP Paribas Masters

Final
- Champions: (Sweden) Jonas Björkman (Zimbabwe) Kevin Ullyett
- Runners-up: (South Africa) Jeff Coetzee (South Africa) Wesley Moodie
- Score: 6–2, 6–2

Details
- Draw: 24
- Seeds: 8

Events
| Singles | Doubles |
| ← 2007 · | BNP Paribas Masters | · 2009 → |

Bob Bryan and Mike Bryan were the defending champions, but lost in the second round to Mariusz Fyrstenberg and Marcin Matkowski.

Jonas Björkman and Kevin Ullyett won in the final 6–2, 6–2, against Jeff Coetzee and Wesley Moodie.

== Seeds ==
All seeds receive a bye into the second round.

1. (United States) Bob Bryan / (United States) Mike Bryan (second round)
2. (Canada) Daniel Nestor / (Serbia) Nenad Zimonjić (second round)
3. (India) Mahesh Bhupathi / (The Bahamas) Mark Knowles (second round)
4. (Czech Republic) Lukáš Dlouhý / (India) Leander Paes (second round)
5. (Sweden) Jonas Björkman / (Zimbabwe) Kevin Ullyett (champions)
6. (South Africa) Jeff Coetzee / (South Africa) Wesley Moodie (final)
7. (Sweden) Simon Aspelin / (Austria) Julian Knowle (quarterfinals)
8. (Israel) Andy Ram / (Brazil) Bruno Soares (quarterfinals)

== Draw ==
=== Key ===
- Q = Qualifier
- WC = Wild card
- LL = Lucky loser
- Alt = Alternate
- SE = Special exempt
- PR = Protected ranking
- ITF = ITF entry
- JE = Junior exempt
- w/o = Walkover
- r = Retired
- d = Defaulted
- SR = Special ranking

=== Finals ===
Semifinals
(Poland) Mariusz Fyrstenberg (Poland) Marcin Matkowski | 4 | 3
6 | (South Africa) Jeff Coetzee (South Africa) Wesley Moodie | 6 | 6
5 | (Sweden) Jonas Björkman (Zimbabwe) Kevin Ullyett | 6 | 6
(France) Arnaud Clément (France) Michaël Llodra | 3 | 2

Final
6 | (South Africa) Jeff Coetzee (South Africa) Wesley Moodie | 2 | 2
5 | (Sweden) Jonas Björkman (Zimbabwe) Kevin Ullyett | 6 | 6

=== Top half ===
First round
(Poland) M Fyrstenberg (Poland) M Matkowski | 7 | 6
(Spain) F López (Spain) F Verdasco | 6^{0} | 2
(Argentina) J Acasuso (Spain) D Ferrer | 6 | 6
(Serbia) N Djokovic (Serbia) V Troicki | 4 | 4
WC | (France) N Mahut (France) P-H Mathieu | 2 | 4
(Argentina) J Mónaco (Spain) R Nadal | 6 | 6
(United Kingdom) J Murray (Czech Republic) P Vízner | 6 | 6^{5} | [10]
(Croatia) M Čilić (Belarus) M Mirnyi | 2 | 7 | [8]

Second round
1 | (United States) B Bryan (United States) M Bryan | 4 | 6 | [5]
(Poland) M Fyrstenberg (Poland) M Matkowski | 6 | 4 | [10]
(Argentina) J Acasuso (Spain) D Ferrer | 2 | 2
7 | (Sweden) S Aspelin (Austria) J Knowle | 6 | 6
3 | (India) M Bhupathi (The Bahamas) M Knowles | 4 | 2
(Argentina) J Mónaco (Spain) R Nadal | 6 | 6
(United Kingdom) J Murray (Czech Republic) P Vízner | 5 | 5
6 | (South Africa) J Coetzee (South Africa) W Moodie | 7 | 7

Quarterfinals
(Poland) M Fyrstenberg (Poland) M Matkowski | 6 | 6
7 | (Sweden) S Aspelin (Austria) J Knowle | 3 | 4
(Argentina) J Mónaco (Spain) R Nadal
6 | (South Africa) J Coetzee (South Africa) W Moodie | w/o

Semifinals
(Poland) M Fyrstenberg (Poland) M Matkowski | 4 | 3
6 | (South Africa) J Coetzee (South Africa) W Moodie | 6 | 6

=== Bottom half ===
First round
(Argentina) L Arnold Ker (Argentina) D Nalbandian | 6 | 7
WC | (France) J Ouanna (France) J-W Tsonga | 2 | 5
(Australia) J Kerr (Finland) J Nieminen | 1 | 4
(Brazil) M Melo (Brazil) A Sá | 6 | 6
(France) G Monfils (France) G Simon | 6 | 2 | [10]
(Czech Republic) M Damm (Czech Republic) R Štěpánek | 1 | 6 | [8]
(Sweden) R Lindstedt (Sweden) R Söderling | 6^{5} | 7 | [8]
(France) A Clément (France) M Llodra | 7 | 5 | [10]

Second round
5 | (Sweden) J Björkman (Zimbabwe) K Ullyett | 7 | 6
(Argentina) L Arnold Ker (Argentina) D Nalbandian | 6^{5} | 4
(Brazil) M Melo (Brazil) A Sá | 6 | 6
4 | (Czech Republic) L Dlouhý (India) L Paes | 3 | 2
8 | (Israel) A Ram (Brazil) B Soares | 6 | 7
(France) G Monfils (France) G Simon | 1 | 6^{3}
(France) A Clément (France) M Llodra | 6 | 7
2 | (Canada) D Nestor (Serbia) N Zimonjić | 4 | 5

Quarterfinals
5 | (Sweden) J Björkman (Zimbabwe) K Ullyett | 6 | 3 | [10]
(Brazil) M Melo (Brazil) A Sá | 4 | 6 | [7]
8 | (Israel) A Ram (Brazil) B Soares | 2 | 6^{3}
(France) A Clément (France) M Llodra | 6 | 7

Semifinals
5 | (Sweden) J Björkman (Zimbabwe) K Ullyett | 6 | 6
(France) A Clément (France) M Llodra | 3 | 2
