= 2009 Monte-Carlo Rolex Masters =

- Date: 11–19 April
- Edition: 103rd
- Category: World Tour Masters 1000
- Draw: 56S / 24D
- Prize money: €2,227,500
- Surface: Clay / outdoor
- Location: Roquebrune-Cap-Martin, France
- Venue: Monte Carlo Country Club

Champions

Singles
- (Spain) Rafael Nadal

Doubles
- (Canada) Daniel Nestor / (Serbia) Nenad Zimonjić
← 2008 ·	Monte Carlo Masters	· 2010 →

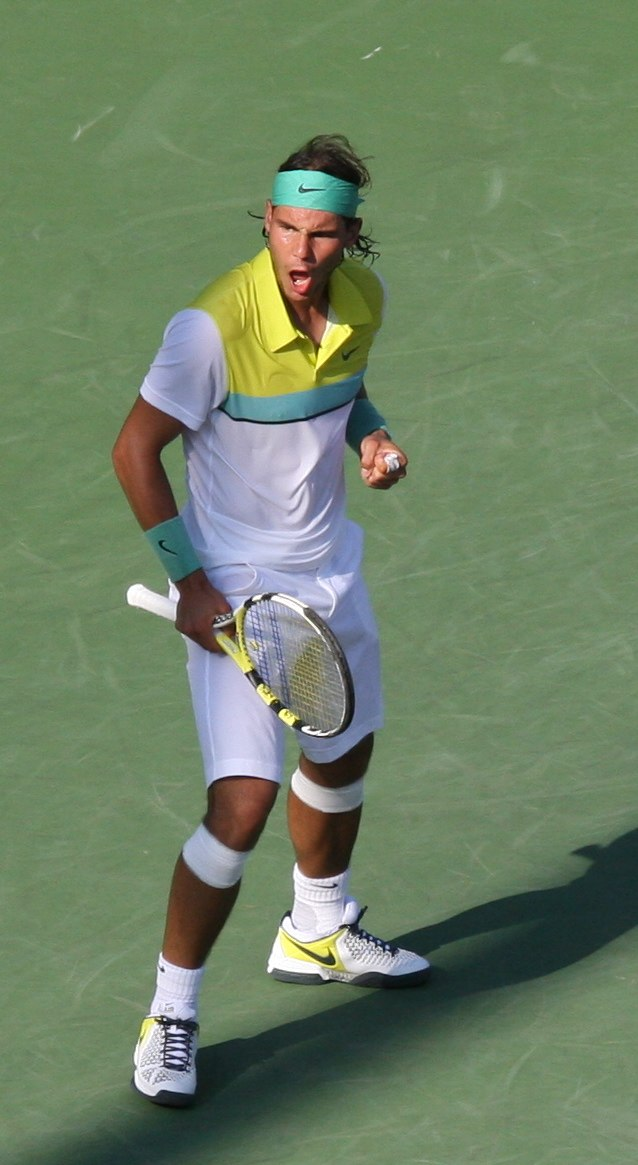
World No. 2, five-time singles champion Rafael Nadal

The 2009 Monte-Carlo Rolex Masters was a men's tennis tournament for professional players held from 11 April until 19 April 2009, on outdoor clay courts. It was the 103rd edition of the annual Monte Carlo Masters tournament, which was sponsored by Rolex for the first time and was classified as an ATP World Tour Masters 1000 tournament on the 2009 ATP World Tour. It took place at the Monte Carlo Country Club in Roquebrune-Cap-Martin, France, near Monte Carlo, Monaco.

Except for Andy Roddick, all the top ranked male tennis players participated. World No. 2 Roger Federer had initially decided not to participate in this tournament but changed his mind and accepted a wild-card invitation to play. World No. 1 and first-seeded Rafael Nadal achieved a record fifth straight singles title at the event (the first to win five consecutives titles in any Masters tournament).

The 2009 Monte Carlo Masters tournament was the only one of the nine "Masters 1000" events scheduled for that year without a mandatory player commitment. In 2007, the Association of Tennis Professionals had decided to make participation in the eight newly rebranded "Masters 1000" compulsory for all top players. The tournaments in Monte Carlo and Hamburg were originally due to be removed from the top tier of events; however, the tournament directors filed lawsuits, and Monte Carlo was allowed to remain a top tier event while Hamburg became a 500 Series event.

== Tournament ==
=== History ===
The Monte Carlo Masters has been held since 1897, firstly as a tournament for amateur players until it became a professional tournament from 1969 onwards with the start of the Open Era. Spaniard Rafael Nadal, the defending champion from 2008, has been the most successful player of the Open Era, winning the previous four titles at the event. Since 1969, Ilie Năstase, Björn Borg, Mats Wilander, Thomas Muster, Gustavo Kuerten and Juan Carlos Ferrero have all won multiple titles. Players such as Reginald Doherty, Laurence Doherty, Anthony Wilding and Gordon Lowe also managed to win a number of titles during the early 20th Century. Nadal was bidding to become the first player to win five successive titles in Monte Carlo.

=== Tournament details ===
The singles competition had a 56 player draw, with the top eight seeds receiving automatic entry into the second round. The doubles followed a similar concept, with a 28 player draw facilitating that the top eight seeds went into round two. Both the singles and doubles were played on outdoor clay courts at the Monte Carlo Country Club.

== Summary ==
=== Singles ===
In the men's singles tournament, nine of the top ten ranked players in the world competed with top eight seeds of the tournament receiving byes in the first round. Of the other seeded players, Gaël Monfils (9) and Radek Štěpánek lost in the first round to Janko Tipsarević and qualifier Nicolás Lapentti, respectively. In the second round, seeds Juan Martín del Potro (5), Marin Čilić (14), Gilles Simon (6), and Tommy Robredo (11) were defeated by lower-ranked players.

Lapentti's run ended in the third round when he lost to World No. 1 Rafael Nadal. Andy Murray (4), Nikolay Davydenko (8), Fernando Verdasco (7), and Novak Djokovic (3) progressed to the quarterfinals, but second-seeded Roger Federer was defeated by 13th-seeded and fellow Swiss player Stanislas Wawrinka. Wawrinka then defeated in straight sets one of the two non-seeded players left in the competition, qualifier Andreas Beck. In the other matches, Nadal beat wildcard Ivan Ljubičić, Murray defeated Davydenko, and Djokovic needed three sets to beat Verdasco.

Murray faced Nadal in the semifinals in Murray's first career clay court semifinal. Nadal came into the match having lost just 14 times on clay in his career and won the match 6–2, 7–6. Djokovic recovered from losing the first set against Wawrinka to win the next two sets and the match 4–6, 6–1, 6–3. The top and the third ranked players in the world played each other in the final, with Nadal bidding to equal Federer's total of 14 Masters titles while Djokovic was appearing in his eighth Masters final. In their sixteenth meeting, Nadal took the first set 6–3, Djokovic won the second 6–2, but Nadal won the third 6–1 to seal his fifth successive title at the Monte Carlo Masters and the 35th of his career.

=== Doubles ===
The top eight doubles pairs automatically gained places in round two. The first round saw many top singles players teaming up, with Gaël Monfils/Stanislas Wawrinka, Marc Gicquel/Paul-Henri Mathieu and Feliciano López/Fernando Verdasco among the pairs to reach the second round. Novak Djokovic also teamed up with fellow Serbian Victor Troicki and beat unseeded doubles specialists Marcelo Melo and André Sá. In the second round, fifth-seeded Bruno Soares and Kevin Ullyett were one of only two seeded pair to depart the competition, losing to Marin Čilić and Nicolas Kiefer on a champions tiebreak. Jeff Coetzee and Jordan Kerr were the other seeds to lose, against Djokovic and Troicki. The Bryan brothers, Bob and Mike defeated Monfils and Wawrinka, while second seeds Daniel Nestor and Nenad Zimonjić also reached the quarter-finals.

In the quarter-finals, Djokovic and Troicki's run continued as they knocked out Mahesh Bhupathi and Mark Knowles. Bob and Mike Bryan, Nestor and Zimonjić and Lukáš Dlouhý and Leander Paes also progressed, with Nestor and Zimonjić the only pair to defeat an unseeded pair in Čilić and Kiefer. In the semi-finals the Bryans beat Dlouhý and Paes 6–7, 6–3, [14–12] and Nestor/Zimonjić ended the run of Djokovic and Troicki 3–6, 6–1, [10–5].

The top two seeds met in the final. In a one-sided match Nestor and Zimonjić beat the Bryans 6–4, 6–1 to win their ninth title as a partnership.

== Entrants ==
=== Seeds ===
Athlete	Nationality	Ranking*	Seeding
Rafael Nadal	Spain	1	1
Roger Federer	Switzerland	2	2, WC
Novak Djokovic	Serbia	3	3
Andy Murray	United Kingdom	4	4
Juan Martín del Potro	Argentina	5	5
Gilles Simon	France	7	6
Fernando Verdasco	Spain	8	7
Nikolay Davydenko	Russia	9	8
Gaël Monfils	France	10	9
David Ferrer	Spain	12	10
Tommy Robredo	Spain	14	11
David Nalbandian	Argentina	15	12
Stanislas Wawrinka	Switzerland	16	13
Marin Čilić	Croatia	18	14
Radek Štěpánek	Czech Republic	19	15
Nicolás Almagro	Spain	20	16

- Rankings as of April 13, 2009.

=== Other entrants ===
The following players received wildcards into the main draw:

- (Switzerland) Roger Federer
- (Croatia) Ivan Ljubičić
- (Australia) Lleyton Hewitt
- (Monaco) Jean-René Lisnard

The following players received entry from the qualifying draw:

- (Italy) Flavio Cipolla
- (Spain) Alberto Martín
- (Italy) Fabio Fognini
- (Germany) Andreas Beck
- (Ecuador) Nicolás Lapentti
- (Spain) Óscar Hernández
- (Belgium) Kristof Vliegen

== Finals ==
=== Singles ===
(Spain) Rafael Nadal defeated (Serbia) Novak Djokovic, 6–3, 2–6, 6–1

- It was Rafael Nadal's 3rd singles title of the year, and his 34th overall. It was his 5th consecutive win at the event.

=== Doubles ===
(Canada) Daniel Nestor / (Serbia) Nenad Zimonjić defeated (United States) Bob Bryan / (United States) Mike Bryan, 6–4, 6–1
