= 2009 BNP Paribas Masters =

- Date: 8–15 November
- Edition: 37th
- Category: ATP World Tour Masters 1000
- Draw: 64S / 32D
- Prize money: € 2,227,500
- Surface: Hard / indoor
- Location: Paris, France
- Venue: Palais omnisports de Paris-Bercy

Champions

Singles
- (Serbia) Novak Djokovic

Doubles
- (Canada) Daniel Nestor / (Serbia) Nenad Zimonjić
← 2008 ·	Paris Masters	· 2010 →

The 2009 Paris Masters (also known as the BNP Paribas Masters for sponsorship reasons) was a tennis tournament played on indoor hard courts. It was the 37th edition of the Paris Masters, and was part of the ATP World Tour Masters 1000 of the 2009 ATP Tour. It was held at the Palais omnisports de Paris-Bercy in Paris, France, from 8 November through 15 November 2009.

In singles, the event was notable for hosting the last ATP Tour appearance of the former Number One player Marat Safin. He lost his second round match against Juan Martín del Potro, 4–6, 7–5, 4–6, in what would be his last professional match.

== ATP players ==
=== Seeds ===
Country	Player	Rank^{1}	Seed
SUI	Roger Federer	1	1
ESP	Rafael Nadal	2	2
SRB	Novak Djokovic	3	3
GBR	Andy Murray	4	4
ARG	Juan Martín del Potro	5	5
RUS	Nikolay Davydenko	7	6
ESP	Fernando Verdasco	8	7
FRA	Jo-Wilfried Tsonga	9	8
SWE	Robin Söderling	10	9
CHI	Fernando González	11	10
FRA	Gilles Simon	12	11
CRO	Marin Čilić	13	12
CZE	Radek Štěpánek	14	13
ESP	Tommy Robredo	15	14
FRA	Gaël Monfils	16	15
GER	Tommy Haas	17	16

- Seeds are based on the rankings of 2 November 2009.

=== Other entrants ===
The following players received wildcards into the singles main draw:

- (France) Sébastien Grosjean
- (France) Michaël Llodra
- (Russia) Marat Safin

The following players received entry into the singles main draw as special exempt:

- (Switzerland) Marco Chiudinelli

The following players received entry from the qualifying draw:

- (France) Thierry Ascione
- (France) Arnaud Clément
- (Colombia) Alejandro Falla
- (France) David Guez
- (Poland) Łukasz Kubot
- (France) Vincent Millot

== Finals ==
=== Singles ===
(Serbia) Novak Djokovic defeated (France) Gaël Monfils 6–2, 5–7, 7–6^{(7–3)}

- It was Djokovic's 5th title of the year and 16th of his career. It was his first win in five Masters Series finals this year, and fifth total Masters 1000 win.

=== Doubles ===
(Canada) Daniel Nestor / (Serbia) Nenad Zimonjić defeated (Spain) Marcel Granollers / (Spain) Tommy Robredo, 6–3, 6–4
