= 2012 Serbia Open – Singles =

Singles
- 2012 Serbia Open

Final
- Champion: (Italy) Andreas Seppi
- Runner-up: (France) Benoît Paire
- Score: 6–3, 6–2

Events
Singles	Doubles
← 2011 ·	Serbia Open	· 2021 →

Andreas Seppi defeated Benoît Paire in the final, 6–3, 6–2 to win the singles tennis title at the 2012 Serbia Open.

Novak Djokovic was the reigning champion, but decided not to participate.

== Seeds ==
The top four seeds receive a bye into the second round.

1. (Spain) Pablo Andújar (semifinals)
2. (Italy) Andreas Seppi (champion)
3. (Finland) Jarkko Nieminen (quarterfinals)
4. (Argentina) David Nalbandian (semifinals)
5. (Poland) Łukasz Kubot (first round)
6. (Italy) Fabio Fognini (first round)
7. (United States) Ryan Harrison (first round)
8. (Luxembourg) Gilles Müller (quarterfinals)

== Draw ==
=== Key ===
- Q = Qualifier
- WC = Wild card
- LL = Lucky loser
- Alt = Alternate
- SE = Special exempt
- PR = Protected ranking
- ITF = ITF entry
- JE = Junior exempt
- w/o = Walkover
- r = Retired
- d = Defaulted
- SR = Special ranking

=== Finals ===
Semifinals
1	(Spain) Pablo Andújar	3	6	3
(France) Benoît Paire	6	1	6
4	(Argentina) David Nalbandian	6	2	5
2	(Italy) Andreas Seppi	2	6	7

Final
(France) Benoît Paire	3	2
2	(Italy) Andreas Seppi	6	6

=== Top half ===
First round
(Italy) F Volandri	6	6
WC	(Serbia) M Djokovic	3	1
(Romania) V Hănescu	6	5	6
Q	(Spain) C Gómez-Herrera	2	7	3
(Czech Republic) L Rosol	7	6
5	(Poland) Ł Kubot	5	2
(Slovenia) B Kavčič	1	1
Q	(Croatia) A Veić	6	6
(Spain) G García López	7^{7}	6^{1}	6
(Russia) I Kunitsyn	6^{4}	7^{7}	2
(France) B Paire	6	6
6	(Italy) F Fognini	1	4

Second round
1	(Spain) P Andújar	4	7	6
(Italy) F Volandri	6	5	2
(Romania) V Hănescu	6^{4}	3
(Czech Republic) L Rosol	7^{7}	6
3	(Finland) J Nieminen	6	4	6
Q	(Croatia) A Veić	3	6	3
(Spain) G García López	6	5	5
(France) B Paire	4	7	7

Quarterfinals
1	(Spain) P Andújar	6	6
(Czech Republic) L Rosol	4	3
3	(Finland) J Nieminen	6	2	5
(France) B Paire	0	6	7

Semifinals
1	(Spain) P Andújar	3	6	3
(France) B Paire	6	1	6

=== Bottom half ===
First round
7	(United States) R Harrison	3	3
(Brazil) J Souza	6	6
WC	(Russia) E Donskoy	5	4
WC	(Serbia) D Lajović	7	6
Q	(Slovenia) A Bedene	6	7^{8}
(Slovakia) M Kližan	4	6^{6}
8	(Luxembourg) G Müller	6	4	6
(Slovakia) L Lacko	0	6	3
Q	(Argentina) E Schwank	6	7^{7}
(Israel) D Sela	2	6^{2}
(Croatia) I Dodig	6	6^{4}	6
(Romania) A Ungur	2	7^{7}	4

Second round
(Brazil) J Souza	4
WC	(Serbia) D Lajović	2^{r}
Q	(Slovenia) A Bedene	4	3
4	(Argentina) D Nalbandian	6	6
8	(Luxembourg) G Müller	6	7^{7}
Q	(Argentina) E Schwank	3	6^{0}
(Croatia) I Dodig	4	2
2	(Italy) A Seppi	6	6

Quarterfinals
(Brazil) J Souza	3	2
4	(Argentina) D Nalbandian	6	6
8	(Luxembourg) G Müller	4	3
2	(Italy) A Seppi	6	6

Semifinals
4	(Argentina) D Nalbandian	6	2	5
2	(Italy) A Seppi	2	6	7

== Qualifying ==
=== Seeds ===
1. (United States) Rajeev Ram (second round, retired because of a back injury)
2. (Croatia) Antonio Veić (qualified)
3. (Slovenia) Aljaž Bedene (qualified)
4. (Argentina) Eduardo Schwank (qualified)
5. (Argentina) Facundo Bagnis (first round)
6. (France) Josselin Ouanna (qualifying competition)
7. (Romania) Victor Crivoi (qualifying competition)
8. (Romania) Marius Copil (first round)

=== Qualifiers ===
1. (Spain) Carlos Gómez-Herrera
2. (Croatia) Antonio Veić
3. (Slovenia) Aljaž Bedene
4. (Argentina) Eduardo Schwank

=== Draw ===
==== First qualifier ====
First round
1	(United States) Rajeev Ram	4	6	6
(Serbia) Miki Janković	6	2	4
(Croatia) Nikola Mektić	6	7^{7}
(Serbia) Peđa Krstin	3	6^{5}
(Serbia) Boris Čonkić	2	3
(Spain) Carlos Gómez-Herrera	6	6
(Austria) Michael Linzer	6	4	7^{7}
5	(Argentina) Facundo Bagnis	4	6	6^{3}

Second round
1	(United States) Rajeev Ram	0^{r}
(Croatia) Nikola Mektić	3
(Spain) Carlos Gómez-Herrera	6	6
(Austria) Michael Linzer	3	4

Qualifying competition
(Croatia) Nikola Mektić	4	7	0
(Spain) Carlos Gómez-Herrera	6	5	6

==== Second qualifier ====
First round
2	(Croatia) Antonio Veić	6	6
WC	(Serbia) Marko Rajić	1	0
(Croatia) Roko Karanušić	1	4
(Bosnia and Herzegovina) Aldin Šetkić	6	6
(France) Nicolas Devilder	6	6
(Russia) Mikhail Ledovskikh	4	3
(Italy) Andrea Arnaboldi	2	0
7	(Romania) Victor Crivoi	6	6

Second round
2	(Croatia) Antonio Veić	6	6
(Bosnia and Herzegovina) Aldin Šetkić	4	2
(France) Nicolas Devilder	2	6	2
7	(Romania) Victor Crivoi	6	2	6

Qualifying competition
2	(Croatia) Antonio Veić	3	6	6
7	(Romania) Victor Crivoi	6	2	3

==== Third qualifier ====
First round
3	(Slovenia) Aljaž Bedene	6	6
(Serbia) Saša Stojisavljević	3	3
(Montenegro) Goran Tošić	2	7^{7}	6
(Hungary) Ádám Kellner	6	6^{4}	1
(Serbia) Vladimir Obradović	4	2
(Serbia) Ilija Bozoljac	6	6
(Serbia) Nikola Cacic	6	7
8	(Romania) Marius Copil	4	5

Second round
3	(Slovenia) Aljaž Bedene	7^{7}	6
(Montenegro) Goran Tošić	6^{4}	3
(Serbia) Ilija Bozoljac	7^{7}	7^{7}
(Serbia) Nikola Cacic	6^{2}	6^{3}

Qualifying competition
3	(Slovenia) Aljaž Bedene	6	6
(Serbia) Ilija Bozoljac	4	1

==== Fourth qualifier ====
First round
4	(Argentina) Eduardo Schwank	6	6
WC	(Croatia) Matej Sabanov	4	1
(Romania) Petru-Alexandru Luncanu	1	6	4
(Serbia) Miljan Zekić	6	4	6
WC	(Croatia) Ivan Sabanov	1	2
(Romania) Gabriel Moraru	6	6
WC	(Serbia) Djordje Djokovic	4	2
6	(France) Josselin Ouanna	6	6

Second round
4	(Argentina) Eduardo Schwank	6	6
(Serbia) Miljan Zekić	4	4
(Romania) Gabriel Moraru	3	1
6	(France) Josselin Ouanna	6	6

Qualifying competition
4	(Argentina) Eduardo Schwank	6	5	7^{7}
6	(France) Josselin Ouanna	3	7	6^{5}
