= 2012 Serbia Open =

Men's tennis tournament

- Date: 28 April – 6 May
- Edition: 4th
- Category: ATP World Tour 250
- Prize money: €366,950
- Surface: Clay / outdoor
- Location: Belgrade, Serbia

Champions

Singles
- (Italy) Andreas Seppi

Doubles
- (Israel) Jonathan Erlich / (Israel) Andy Ram
← 2011 ·	Serbia Open	· 2021 →

The 2012 Serbia Open (also known as Serbia Open 2012 powered by Telekom Srbija for sponsorship reasons) was a men's tennis tournament play on outdoor clay courts. The fourth edition of the event was hosted by Serbian player Novak Djokovic. It was part of the ATP World Tour 250 series of the 2012 ATP World Tour. It took place at the Tennis Center Novak complex in Belgrade, Serbia, from 28 April through 6 May 2012. Andreas Seppi won the singles title.

== Singles main draw entrants ==
=== Seeds ===
Country	Player	Rank^{1}	Seed
ESP	Pablo Andújar	38	1
ITA	Andreas Seppi	46	2
FIN	Jarkko Nieminen	47	3
ARG	David Nalbandian	49	4
POL	Łukasz Kubot	51	5
ITA	Fabio Fognini	57	6
USA	Ryan Harrison	58	7
LUX	Gilles Müller	61	8

- Seedings are based on the rankings of April 23, 2012

=== Other entrants ===
The following players received wildcards into the main draw:

- (Serbia) Marko Djokovic
- (Russia) Evgeny Donskoy
- (Serbia) Dušan Lajović

The following players received entry from the qualifying draw:

- (Slovenia) Aljaž Bedene
- (Spain) Carlos Gómez-Herrera
- (Argentina) Eduardo Schwank
- (Croatia) Antonio Veić

=== Withdrawals ===
- (Serbia) Novak Djokovic (personal reasons)

=== Retirements ===
- (Serbia) Dušan Lajović (ankle injury)

== Doubles main draw entrants ==
=== Seeds ===
Country	Player	Country	Player	Rank^{1}	Seed
SWE	Robert Lindstedt	ROU	Horia Tecău	17	1
USA	Scott Lipsky	USA	Rajeev Ram	92	2
ISR	Jonathan Erlich	ISR	Andy Ram	97	3
USA	James Cerretani	CAN	Adil Shamasdin	129	4

- Rankings are as of April 23, 2012

=== Other entrants ===
The following pairs received wildcards into the doubles main draw:

- (Serbia) Ilija Bozoljac / (Serbia) Nikola Čačić
- (Serbia) Marko Djokovic / (Montenegro) Goran Tošić

=== Retirements ===
- (Argentina) David Nalbandian (fatigue)

== Finals ==
=== Singles ===
(Italy) Andreas Seppi defeated (France) Benoît Paire, 6–3, 6–2

- It was Seppi's 1st title of the year and 2nd of his career.

=== Doubles ===
(Israel) Jonathan Erlich / (Israel) Andy Ram defeated (Germany) Martin Emmrich / (Sweden) Andreas Siljeström, 4–6, 6–2, [10–6]
