= 2021 Serbia Open – Men's singles =

Men's singles
- 2021 Serbia Open

Final
- Champion: (Italy) Matteo Berrettini
- Runner-up: (Russia) Aslan Karatsev
- Score: 6–1, 3–6, 7–6^{(7–0)}

Details
- Draw: 28 (4 Q/ 3 WC)
- Seeds: 8

Events
| Singles | men | women |
| Doubles | men | women |
| ← 2012 · | Serbia Open | · 2022 → |

Matteo Berrettini defeated Aslan Karatsev in the final, 6–1, 3–6, 7–6^{(7–0)} to win the men's singles tennis title at the 2021 Serbia Open.

Andreas Seppi was the reigning champion from when the event was last held in 2012, but he decided not to participate this year.

== Seeds ==
The top four seeds received a bye into the second round.

1. (Serbia) Novak Djokovic (semifinals)
2. (Italy) Matteo Berrettini (champion)
3. (Russia) Aslan Karatsev (final)
4. (Serbia) Dušan Lajović (second round)
5. (Serbia) Filip Krajinović (quarterfinals)
6. (Hungary) Márton Fucsovics (withdrew)
7. (Australia) John Millman (second round)
8. (Serbia) Miomir Kecmanović (quarterfinals)
9. (Serbia) Laslo Đere (first round)

== Draw ==
=== Key ===
- Q = Qualifier
- WC = Wild card
- LL = Lucky loser
- Alt = Alternate
- SE = Special exempt
- PR = Protected ranking
- ITF = ITF entry
- JE = Junior exempt
- w/o = Walkover
- r = Retired
- d = Defaulted
- SR = Special ranking

=== Finals ===
Semifinals
1 | (Serbia) Novak Djokovic | 5 | 6 | 4
3 | (Russia) Aslan Karatsev | 7 | 4 | 6
LL | (Japan) Taro Daniel | 1 | 7^{7} | 0
2 | (Italy) Matteo Berrettini | 6 | 6^{5} | 6

Final
3 | (Russia) Aslan Karatsev | 1 | 6 | 6^{0}
2 | (Italy) Matteo Berrettini | 6 | 3 | 7^{7}

=== Top half ===
First round
(South Korea) S-w Kwon | 6 | 7
LL | (Spain) R Carballés Baena | 3 | 5
Q | (France) A Rinderknech | 6 | 7
(Argentina) JI Londero | 1 | 5
Q | (Argentina) F Bagnis | 6^{5} | 6^{4}
8 | (Serbia) M Kecmanović | 7^{7} | 7^{7}
(United States) S Korda | 5 | 6 | 6^{5}
(Slovenia) A Bedene | 7 | 1 | 7^{7}
Q | (Argentina) F Cerúndolo | 6 | 6^{5} | 6^{6}
(Australia) A Popyrin | 4 | 7^{7} | 7^{8}
Q | (Italy) G Mager | 6 | 6
9 | (Serbia) L Đere | 4 | 3

Second round
1 | (Serbia) N Djokovic | 6 | 6
(South Korea) S-w Kwon | 1 | 3
Q | (France) A Rinderknech | 3 | 6 | 3
8 | (Serbia) M Kecmanović | 6 | 3 | 6
3 | (Russia) A Karatsev | 6 | 4 | 7^{7}
(Slovenia) A Bedene | 3 | 6 | 6^{5}
(Australia) A Popyrin | 5 | 2
Q | (Italy) G Mager | 7 | 6

Quarterfinals
1 | (Serbia) N Djokovic | 6 | 6
8 | (Serbia) M Kecmanović | 1 | 3
3 | (Russia) A Karatsev | 6 | 6
Q | (Italy) G Mager | 3 | 4

Semifinals
1 | (Serbia) N Djokovic | 5 | 6 | 4
3 | (Russia) A Karatsev | 7 | 4 | 6

=== Bottom half ===
First round
7 | (Australia) J Millman | 7 | 6
WC | (Serbia) D Petrović | 5 | 4
LL | (Portugal) J Sousa | 5 | 3
LL | (Japan) T Daniel | 7 | 6
(Lithuania) R Berankis | 4 | 6 | 1
(Argentina) F Delbonis | 6 | 3 | 6
5 | (Serbia) F Krajinović | 7 | 5 | 6
(Italy) S Travaglia | 5 | 7 | 3
WC | (Serbia) N Milojević | 6 | 6
(Argentina) F Coria | 4 | 0
WC | (Serbia) V Troicki | 1 | 4
(Italy) M Cecchinato | 6 | 6

Second round
7 | (Australia) J Millman | 6 | 2 | 3
LL | (Japan) T Daniel | 3 | 6 | 6
(Argentina) F Delbonis | 6 | 2 | 6
4 | (Serbia) D Lajović | 3 | 6 | 4
5 | (Serbia) F Krajinović | 6 | 6
WC | (Serbia) N Milojević | 1 | 1
(Italy) M Cecchinato | 4 | 3
2 | (Italy) M Berrettini | 6 | 6

Quarterfinals
LL | (Japan) T Daniel | 4 | 6 | 7
(Argentina) F Delbonis | 6 | 1 | 5
5 | (Serbia) F Krajinović | 4 | 4
2 | (Italy) M Berrettini | 6 | 6

Semifinals
LL | (Japan) T Daniel | 1 | 7^{7} | 0
2 | (Italy) M Berrettini | 6 | 6^{5} | 6

== Qualifying ==
=== Seeds ===
1. (Italy) Gianluca Mager (qualified)
2. (Argentina) Facundo Bagnis (qualified)
3. (Spain) Roberto Carballés Baena (qualifying competition, lucky loser)
4. (Portugal) João Sousa (qualifying competition, lucky loser)
5. (Japan) Yūichi Sugita (first round)
6. (Colombia) Daniel Elahi Galán (first round)
7. (Argentina) Francisco Cerúndolo (qualified)
8. (Japan) Taro Daniel (qualifying competition, lucky loser)

=== Qualifiers ===
1. (Italy) Gianluca Mager
2. (Argentina) Facundo Bagnis
3. (Argentina) Francisco Cerúndolo
4. (France) Arthur Rinderknech

=== Lucky losers ===
1. (Spain) Roberto Carballés Baena
2. (Portugal) João Sousa
3. (Japan) Taro Daniel

=== Qualifying draw ===
==== First qualifier ====
First round
1 | (Italy) Gianluca Mager | 4 | 7^{7} | 6
(France) Benjamin Bonzi | 6 | 6^{1} | 3
WC | (Serbia) Marko Miladinović | 1 | 2
8 | (Japan) Taro Daniel | 6 | 6

Qualifying competition
1 | (Italy) Gianluca Mager | 6 | 4 | 6
8 | (Japan) Taro Daniel | 1 | 6 | 4

==== Second qualifier ====
First round
2 | (Argentina) Facundo Bagnis | 6 | 6
(Russia) Evgeny Donskoy | 3 | 2
WC | (Serbia) Hamad Međedović | 7^{7} | 7^{7}
6 | (Colombia) Daniel Elahi Galán | 6^{4} | 6^{5}

Qualifying competition
2 | (Argentina) Facundo Bagnis | 6 | 6
WC | (Serbia) Hamad Međedović | 4 | 2

==== Third qualifier ====
First round
3 | (Spain) Roberto Carballés Baena | 7^{7} | 2 | 0
(Bosnia and Herzegovina) Damir Džumhur | 6^{2} | 6 | 0^{r}
(Slovakia) Jozef Kovalík | 5 | 4
7 | (Argentina) Francisco Cerúndolo | 7 | 6

Qualifying competition
3 | (Spain) Roberto Carballés Baena | 6^{6} | 4
7 | (Argentina) Francisco Cerúndolo | 7^{8} | 6

==== Fourth qualifier ====
First round
4 | (Portugal) João Sousa | 6 | 6
(United States) Brandon Nakashima | 4 | 2
(France) Arthur Rinderknech | 6 | 6
5 | (Japan) Yūichi Sugita | 1 | 2

Qualifying competition
4 | (Portugal) João Sousa | 5 | 4
(France) Arthur Rinderknech | 7 | 6
