= 2010 Serbia Open =

- Date: 3–9 May
- Edition: 2nd
- Category: ATP World Tour 250
- Prize money: €373,200
- Surface: Clay / outdoor
- Location: Belgrade, Serbia
- Venue: Milan Gale Muškatirović

Champions

Singles
- (United States) Sam Querrey

Doubles
- (Mexico) Santiago González / (United States) Travis Rettenmaier
- Serbia Open

The 2010 Serbia Open (also known as Serbia Open powered by Telekom Srbija for sponsorship reasons) was a men's tennis tournament played on outdoor clay courts. It was the 2nd edition of the event. It was part of the ATP World Tour 250 series of the 2010 ATP World Tour. It took place at the Milan Gale Muškatirović complex in Belgrade, Serbia, from 3 May through 9 May 2010.

The singles draw featured the tournament's host, ATP ranked No. 2 and defending champion Novak Djokovic. Other featured stars were 2010 Grand Prix Hassan II champion Stan Wawrinka, 2010 Regions Morgan Keegan Championships champion Sam Querrey and 2010 Heineken Open champion John Isner. Third-seeded Isner won the singles title.

== Entrants ==
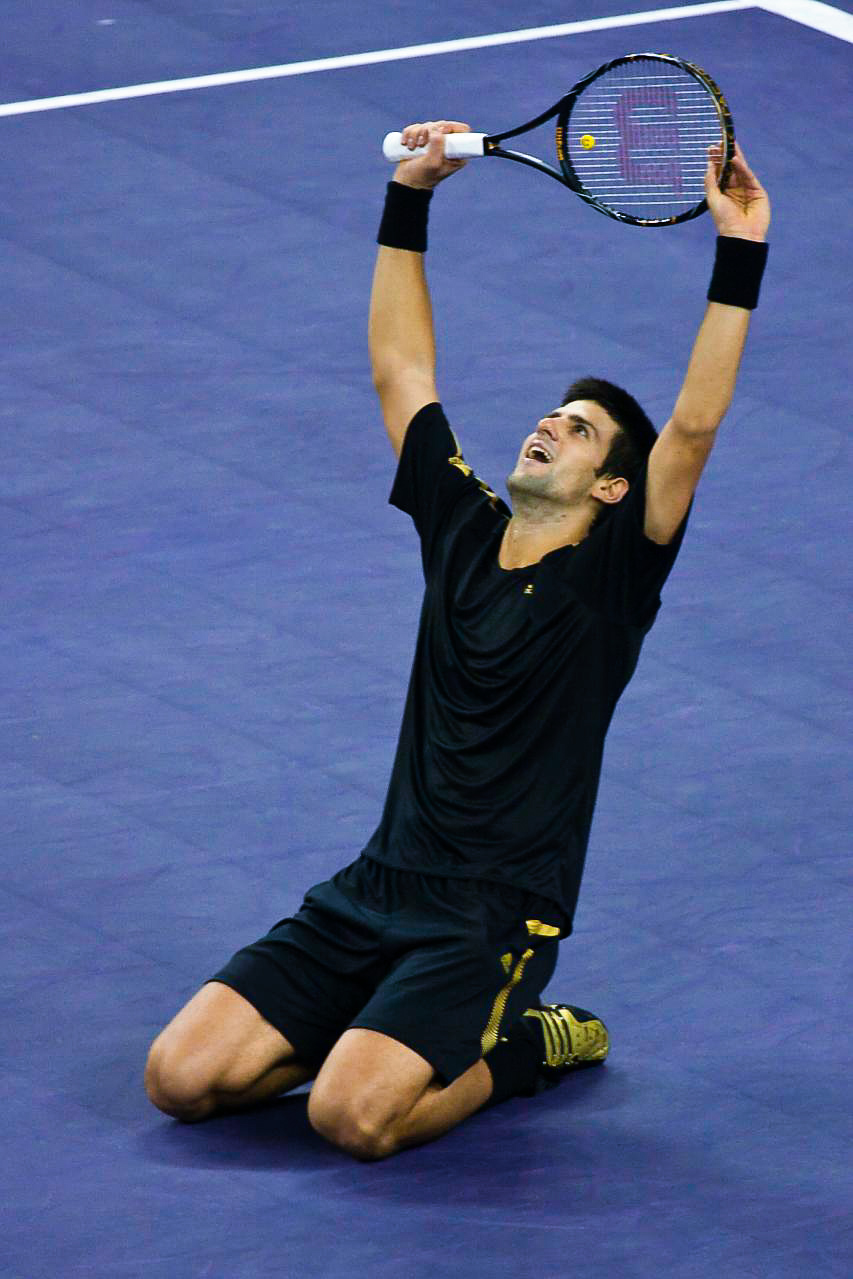
Singles draw top seed Novak Djokovic

=== Seeds ===
Player	Nationality	Ranking*	Seeding
Novak Djokovic	Serbia	2	1
John Isner	United States	22	2
Sam Querrey	United States	23	3
Stanislas Wawrinka	Switzerland	26	4
Ivo Karlović	Croatia	30	5
Viktor Troicki	Serbia	37	6
Janko Tipsarević	Serbia	38	7
Andreas Seppi	Italy	47	8

- Seedings are based on the rankings of April 26, 2010.

=== Other entrants ===
The following players received wildcards into the main draw:

- (Serbia) Marko Djokovic
- (Serbia) Filip Krajinović
- (Serbia) Dušan Lajović

The following players received entry from the qualifying draw:

- (Italy) Flavio Cipolla
- (Italy) Alessio di Mauro
- (Russia) Evgeny Donskoy
- (Croatia) Franko Škugor

== Finals ==
=== Singles ===
(United States) Sam Querrey defeated (United States) John Isner, 3–6, 7–6^{(7–4)}, 6–4

- It was Querrey's 2nd title of the year and 4th of his career

=== Doubles ===
(Mexico) Santiago González / (United States) Travis Rettenmaier defeated (Poland) Tomasz Bednarek / (Poland) Mateusz Kowalczyk, 7–6^{(8–6)}, 6–1
