= 2011 Serbia Open =

- Date: April 23 – May 1
- Edition: 3rd
- Category: ATP World Tour 250
- Prize money: €364,900
- Surface: Clay
- Location: Belgrade, Serbia

Champions

Singles
- (Serbia) Novak Djokovic

Doubles
- (Czech Republic) František Čermák / (Slovakia) Filip Polášek
← 2010 ·	Serbia Open	· 2012 →

The 2011 Serbia Open (also known as Serbia Open 2011 powered by Telekom Srbija for sponsorship reasons) was a men's tennis tournament played on outdoor clay courts. The third edition of the event, hosted by current Serbian player Novak Djokovic, was part of the ATP World Tour 250 series of the 2011 ATP World Tour. It took place at the Tennis Center Novak complex in Belgrade, Serbia from April 23 through May 1. Sam Querrey was the defending champion.

== Entrants ==
=== Seeds ===
Country	Player	Rank^{1}	Seed
SRB	Novak Djokovic	2	1
SRB	Viktor Troicki	16	2
ESP	Albert Montañés	26	3
ESP	Guillermo García López	27	4
USA	John Isner	29	5
LAT	Ernests Gulbis	31	6
SRB	Janko Tipsarević	36	7
ARG	Juan Mónaco	37	8

- Seedings are based on the rankings of April 18, 2011.

=== Other entrants ===
The following players received wildcards into the main draw:

- (Chile) Fernando González
- (Latvia) Ernests Gulbis
- (Serbia) Dušan Lajović

The following players received special exempts into the main draw:

- (Ukraine) Illya Marchenko
- (Germany) Mischa Zverev

The following players received entry from the qualifying draw:

- (Slovakia) Martin Kližan
- (Austria) Alexander Peya
- (Croatia) Franko Škugor
- (Romania) Adrian Ungur

== Champions ==
=== Singles ===
(Serbia) Novak Djokovic def. (Spain) Feliciano López, 7–6(4), 6–2

- It was Djokovic's 5th title of the year and 23rd of his career. It was his 2nd win at Belgrade, also winning in 2009. The win in the final marked Djokovic's 29th consecutive win.

=== Doubles ===
(Czech Republic) František Čermák / (Slovakia) Filip Polášek def. (Austria) Oliver Marach / (Austria) Alexander Peya, 7–5, 6–2
