= 2010 Serbia Open – Doubles =

Doubles
- 2010 Serbia Open

Final
- Champions: (Mexico) Santiago González (United States) Travis Rettenmaier
- Runners-up: (Poland) Tomasz Bednarek (Poland) Mateusz Kowalczyk
- Score: 7–6^{(8–6)}, 6–1

Events
Singles	Doubles
← 2009 ·	Serbia Open	· 2011 →

Łukasz Kubot and Oliver Marach were the defenders of title, but Kubot chose not to compete this year and Marach chose to play in Munich instead.
Santiago González and Travis Rettenmaier won in the final 7–6^{(8–6)}, 6–1, against Tomasz Bednarek and Mateusz Kowalczyk.

== Seeds ==
1. (Sweden) Johan Brunström / (Netherlands Antilles) Jean-Julien Rojer (semifinals)
2. (United Kingdom) Ross Hutchins / (Australia) Jordan Kerr (semifinals)
3. (Argentina) Sebastián Prieto / (Netherlands) Rogier Wassen (first round)
4. (Argentina) Leonardo Mayer / (Argentina) Horacio Zeballos (quarterfinals, withdrew)

== Draw ==
=== Key ===
- Q = Qualifier
- WC = Wild card
- LL = Lucky loser
- Alt = Alternate
- SE = Special exempt
- PR = Protected ranking
- ITF = ITF entry
- JE = Junior exempt
- w/o = Walkover
- r = Retired
- d = Defaulted
- SR = Special ranking

=== Draw ===
First round
1	(Sweden) J Brunström (Netherlands Antilles) J-J Rojer	7	6
(Kazakhstan) E Korolev (Germany) F Moser	6^{1}	4
(Belgium) O Rochus (United States) M Russell	6	6
(Switzerland) Y Allegro (Croatia) L Zovko	3	4
3	(Argentina) S Prieto (Netherlands) R Wassen	1	5
(Serbia) I Bozoljac (Serbia) D Vemić	6	7
(Italy) F Fognini (Italy) A Seppi	6	3	[5]
(Mexico) S González (United States) T Rettenmaier	3	6	[10]
(United States) J Cerretani (Canada) A Shamasdin	2	4
(Poland) T Bednarek (Poland) M Kowalczyk	6	6
WC	(Serbia) N Čačić (Serbia) M Djokovic	6	1	[9]
4	(Argentina) L Mayer (Argentina) H Zeballos	3	6	[11]
WC	(Serbia) D Savić (United States) D Zivkovic	6	6
(Italy) F Cipolla (Spain) I Navarro	3	1
(United Kingdom) J Marray (United Kingdom) J Murray	3	2
2	(United Kingdom) R Hutchins (Australia) J Kerr	6	6

Quarterfinals
1	(Sweden) J Brunström (Netherlands Antilles) J-J Rojer	6	6
(Belgium) O Rochus (United States) M Russell	3	0
(Serbia) I Bozoljac (Serbia) D Vemić	5	2
(Mexico) S González (United States) T Rettenmaier	7	6
(Poland) T Bednarek (Poland) M Kowalczyk
4	(Argentina) L Mayer (Argentina) H Zeballos	w/o
WC	(Serbia) D Savić (United States) D Zivkovic	3	3
2	(United Kingdom) R Hutchins (Australia) J Kerr	6	6

Semifinals
1	(Sweden) J Brunström (Netherlands Antilles) J-J Rojer	5	6^{4}
(Mexico) S González (United States) T Rettenmaier	7	7
(Poland) T Bednarek (Poland) M Kowalczyk	6	5	[10]
2	(United Kingdom) R Hutchins (Australia) J Kerr	2	7	[8]

Finals
(Mexico) S González (United States) T Rettenmaier	7	6
(Poland) T Bednarek (Poland) M Kowalczyk	6^{6}	1
