= 2010 Serbia Open – Singles =

Singles
- 2010 Serbia Open

Final
- Champion: (United States) Sam Querrey
- Runner-up: (United States) John Isner
- Score: 3–6, 7–6^{(7–4)}, 6–4

Events
Singles	Doubles
← 2009 ·	Serbia Open	· 2011 →

Sam Querrey defeated John Isner in the final, 3–6, 7–6^{(7–4)}, 6–4 to win the singles tennis title at the 2010 Serbia Open.

Novak Djokovic was the defending champion, but retired in the quarterfinals against Filip Krajinović.

== Seeds ==
The first four seeds gets a first-round bye.

1. (Serbia) Novak Djokovic (quarterfinals, retired due to breathing problems)
2. (United States) John Isner (final)
3. (United States) Sam Querrey (champion)
4. (Switzerland) Stanislas Wawrinka (semifinals)
5. (Croatia) Ivo Karlović (second round)
6. (Serbia) Viktor Troicki (quarterfinals)
7. (Serbia) Janko Tipsarević (withdrew, illness)
8. (Italy) Andreas Seppi (second round)

== Draw ==
=== Key ===
- Q = Qualifier
- WC = Wild card
- LL = Lucky loser
- Alt = Alternate
- SE = Special exempt
- PR = Protected ranking
- ITF = ITF entry
- JE = Junior exempt
- w/o = Walkover
- r = Retired
- d = Defaulted
- SR = Special ranking

=== Finals ===
Semifinals
WC	(Serbia) Filip Krajinović	1	2
3	(United States) Sam Querrey	6	6
4	(Switzerland) Stanislas Wawrinka	5	5
2	(United States) John Isner	7	7

Final
3	(United States) Sam Querrey	3	7	6
2	(United States) John Isner	6	6^{4}	4

=== Top half ===
First round
(Italy) F Fognini	6	6
Q	(Croatia) F Škugor	3	1
Q	(Russia) E Donskoy	7	6^{7}	1
WC	(Serbia) F Krajinović	5	7	6
(Argentina) H Zeballos	2	6	7
LL	(Canada) P Polansky	6	4	6^{2}
(Kazakhstan) E Korolev	6	6
(United States) M Russell	1	0
(Russia) I Andreev	6	6
(Slovenia) B Kavčič	3	2
WC	(Serbia) D Lajović	6^{4}	4
5	(Croatia) I Karlović	7	6

Second round
1	(Serbia) N Djokovic	6	6
(Italy) F Fognini	4	4
WC	(Serbia) F Krajinović	6	1	7
(Argentina) H Zeballos	3	6	6^{5}
3	(United States) S Querrey	6	6
(Kazakhstan) E Korolev	3	4
(Russia) I Andreev	6	7
5	(Croatia) I Karlović	4	5

Quarterfinals
1	(Serbia) N Djokovic	4	r
WC	(Serbia) F Krajinović	6
3	(United States) S Querrey	6	2	6
(Russia) I Andreev	3	6	4

Semifinals
WC	(Serbia) F Krajinović	1	2
3	(United States) S Querrey	6	6

=== Bottom half ===
First round
6	(Serbia) V Troicki	6	6
(Spain) I Navarro	4	0
(Slovakia) K Beck	3	3
(France) F Serra	6	6
WC	(Serbia) M Djokovic	7	5	0
Q	(Italy) A di Mauro	6^{5}	7	6
8	(Italy) A Seppi	2	6	6
(Argentina) L Mayer	6	1	4
(Belgium) O Rochus	0	1
(France) R Gasquet	6	6
Q	(Italy) F Cipolla	3	0
(France) J Ouanna	6	6

Second round
6	(Serbia) V Troicki	6	6
(France) F Serra	0	1
Q	(Italy) A di Mauro	1	4
4	(Switzerland) S Wawrinka	6	6
8	(Italy) A Seppi	6	2	5
(France) R Gasquet	4	6	7
(France) J Ouanna	2	4
2	(United States) J Isner	6	6

Quarterfinals
6	(Serbia) V Troicki	5	7	6^{6}
4	(Switzerland) S Wawrinka	7	6^{3}	7
(France) R Gasquet	6	6^{2}	3
2	(United States) J Isner	2	7	6

Semifinals
4	(Switzerland) S Wawrinka	5	5
2	(United States) J Isner	7	7
