= 2021 Serbia Open – Men's doubles =

Men's doubles
- 2021 Serbia Open

Final
- Champions: (Croatia) Ivan Sabanov (Croatia) Matej Sabanov
- Runners-up: (Uruguay) Ariel Behar (Ecuador) Gonzalo Escobar
- Score: 6–3, 7–6^{(7–5)}

Events
| Singles | men | women |
| Doubles | men | women |
- Serbia Open

Jonathan Erlich and Andy Ram were the last defending champions after victory in 2012, but Erlich chose not to participate and Ram retired from professional tennis in 2014.

Ivan and Matej Sabanov won the title, defeating Ariel Behar and Gonzalo Escobar in the final, 6–3, 7–6^{(7–5)}.

== Seeds ==
1. (Croatia) Nikola Mektić / (Croatia) Mate Pavić (withdrew)
2. (United States) Austin Krajicek / (Austria) Oliver Marach (first round)
3. (South Africa) Raven Klaasen / (Japan) Ben McLachlan (first round)
4. (El Salvador) Marcelo Arévalo / (Netherlands) Matwé Middelkoop (first round)

== Draw ==
Key

- Q = Qualifier
- WC = Wild card
- LL = Lucky loser
- Alt = Alternate
- ITF = ITF entry
- PR = Protected ranking
- SR = Special ranking
- SE = Special exempt
- JE = Junior exempt
- JR = Junior Accelerator Programme entrant
- CO = College Accelerator Programme entrant
- NG = Next Gen Accelerator Program entrant
- w/o = Walkover
- r = Retired
- d = Defaulted

=== Draw ===
First round
Alt | (New Zealand) A Sitak (Italy) S Travaglia | 2 | 6 | [6]
(Uruguay) A Behar (Ecuador) G Escobar | 6 | 3 | [10]
(Australia) J Millman (Australia) J-P Smith | 6 | 6
(Brazil) M Demoliner (Mexico) S González | 4 | 3
4 | (El Salvador) M Arévalo (Netherlands) M Middelkoop | 4 | 6^{5}
(Bosnia and Herzegovina) T Brkić (Serbia) N Ćaćić | 6 | 7^{7}
WC | (Serbia) M Kecmanović (Serbia) D Lajović | 4 | 4
(Italy) S Bolelli (Argentina) M González | 6 | 6
(India) R Bopanna (Uruguay) P Cuevas | 1 | 0^{r}
(Slovenia) A Bedene (India) D Sharan | 6 | 0
WC | (Croatia) I Sabanov (Croatia) M Sabanov | 6 | 6
3 | (South Africa) R Klaasen (Japan) B McLachlan | 4 | 2
(Italy) M Berrettini (Italy) A Vavassori | 7^{9} | 6
(Argentina) A Molteni (Denmark) F Nielsen | 6^{7} | 4
(United Kingdom) L Bambridge (United Kingdom) D Inglot | 6^{5} | 7^{9} | [10]
2 | (United States) A Krajicek (Austria) O Marach | 7^{7} | 6^{7} | [7]

Quarterfinals
(Uruguay) A Behar (Ecuador) G Escobar | 6 | 7
(Australia) J Millman (Australia) J-P Smith | 4 | 5
(Bosnia and Herzegovina) T Brkić (Serbia) N Ćaćić | 0 | 7^{9} | [10]
(Italy) S Bolelli (Argentina) M González | 6 | 6^{7} | [8]
(Slovenia) A Bedene (India) D Sharan | 1 | 3
WC | (Croatia) I Sabanov (Croatia) M Sabanov | 6 | 6
(Italy) M Berrettini (Italy) A Vavassori | 6 | 7^{7}
(United Kingdom) L Bambridge (United Kingdom) D Inglot | 4 | 6^{3}

Semifinals
(Uruguay) A Behar (Ecuador) G Escobar | 6 | 6
(Bosnia and Herzegovina) T Brkić (Serbia) N Ćaćić | 3 | 4
WC | (Croatia) I Sabanov (Croatia) M Sabanov | 7^{11} | 6
(Italy) M Berrettini (Italy) A Vavassori | 6^{9} | 3

Final
(Uruguay) A Behar (Ecuador) G Escobar | 3 | 6^{5}
WC | (Croatia) I Sabanov (Croatia) M Sabanov | 6 | 7^{7}
