= 2012 Serbia Open – Doubles =

Doubles
- 2012 Serbia Open

Final
- Champions: (Israel) Jonathan Erlich (Israel) Andy Ram
- Runners-up: (Germany) Martin Emmrich (Sweden) Andreas Siljeström
- Score: 4–6, 6–2, [10–6]

Events
Singles	Doubles
← 2011 ·	Serbia Open	· 2021 →

František Čermák and Filip Polášek were the defending champions, but they decided to participate instead at the 2012 BMW Open.
Jonathan Erlich and Andy Ram won the title defeating Martin Emmrich and Andreas Siljeström 4–6, 6–2, [10–6] in the final.

== Seeds ==
1. (Sweden) Robert Lindstedt / (Romania) Horia Tecău (quarterfinals)
2. (United States) Scott Lipsky / (United States) Rajeev Ram (semifinals)
3. (Israel) Jonathan Erlich / (Israel) Andy Ram (champions)
4. (United States) James Cerretani / (Canada) Adil Shamasdin (first round)

== Draw ==
=== Key ===
- Q = Qualifier
- WC = Wild card
- LL = Lucky loser
- Alt = Alternate
- SE = Special exempt
- PR = Protected ranking
- ITF = ITF entry
- JE = Junior exempt
- w/o = Walkover
- r = Retired
- d = Defaulted
- SR = Special ranking

=== Draw ===
First round
1	(Sweden) R Lindstedt (Romania) H Tecău	6	6
WC	(Serbia) M Djokovic (Montenegro) G Tošić	3	3
(Spain) P Andújar (Spain) G García-López	2	6	[15]
WC	(Serbia) I Bozoljac (Serbia) N Čačić	6	2	[13]
3	(Israel) J Erlich (Israel) A Ram	7	6
(United States) T Parrott (Slovakia) I Zelenay	5	3
(Italy) A Motti (France) B Paire	7	6^{1}	[5]
(Croatia) I Dodig (Croatia) A Veić	5	7^{7}	[10]
(Italy) A Seppi (Italy) F Volandri	6	4	[4]
(Germany) M Emmrich (Sweden) A Siljeström	3	6	[10]
(Italy) D Bracciali (Czech Republic) L Rosol	6	6
4	(United States) J Cerretani (Canada) A Shamasdin	0	3
(Argentina) D Nalbandian (Argentina) E Schwank
(Australia) J Kerr (Israel) D Sela	w/o
(Australia) R Junaid (Slovakia) L Lacko	6^{0}	7^{7}	[3]
2	(United States) S Lipsky (United States) R Ram	7^{7}	6^{5}	[10]

Quarterfinals
1	(Sweden) R Lindstedt (Romania) H Tecău	6	2	[9]
(Spain) P Andújar (Spain) G García-López	4	6	[11]
3	(Israel) J Erlich (Israel) A Ram	6	2	[10]
(Croatia) I Dodig (Croatia) A Veić	3	6	[7]
(Germany) M Emmrich (Sweden) A Siljeström	6	3	[10]
(Italy) D Bracciali (Czech Republic) L Rosol	4	6	[7]
(Australia) J Kerr (Israel) D Sela	3	3
2	(United States) S Lipsky (United States) R Ram	6	6

Semifinals
(Spain) P Andújar (Spain) G García-López	3	6	[8]
3	(Israel) J Erlich (Israel) A Ram	6	3	[10]
(Germany) M Emmrich (Sweden) A Siljeström	6	6
2	(United States) S Lipsky (United States) R Ram	2	4

Final
3	(Israel) J Erlich (Israel) A Ram	4	6	[10]
(Germany) M Emmrich (Sweden) A Siljeström	6	2	[6]
