= 2011 Serbia Open – Singles Qualifying =

This article displays the qualifying draw of the 2011 Serbia Open.

== Players ==
=== Seeds ===
1. (Chinese Taipei) Lu Yen-Hsun (first round)
2. (Turkey) Marsel İlhan (qualifying competition)
3. (Kazakhstan) Yuri Schukin (first round)
4. (France) Vincent Millot (second round)
5. (Slovakia) Martin Kližan (qualified)
6. (Croatia) Franko Škugor (qualified)
7. (Romania) Adrian Ungur (qualified)
8. (Serbia) Nikola Ćirić (second round)

=== Qualifiers ===
1. (Austria) Alexander Peya
2. (Romania) Adrian Ungur
3. (Croatia) Franko Škugor
4. (Slovakia) Martin Kližan

== Qualifying draw ==
=== First qualifier ===
First Round
1	(Chinese Taipei) Lu Yen-Hsun	0	4
(Sweden) Ervin Eleskovic	6	6
WC	(Serbia) Nikola Milojević	2	4
(Spain) Gerard Granollers	6	6
(Italy) Alberto Brizzi	2	2
(Austria) Alexander Peya	6	6
(Belarus) Siarhei Betau	6	3	6^{4}
8	(Serbia) Nikola Ćirić	2	6	7

Second Round
(Sweden) Ervin Eleskovic	4	4
(Spain) Gerard Granollers	6	6
(Austria) Alexander Peya	6	5	7
8	(Serbia) Nikola Ćirić	0	7	6^{1}

Qualifying Competition
(Spain) Gerard Granollers	6	1	4
(Austria) Alexander Peya	4	6	6

=== Second qualifier ===
First Round
2	(Turkey) Marsel İlhan	7	7
WC	(Serbia) Dušan Vemić	5	5
(France) Nicolas Devilder	6	7
(Bosnia and Herzegovina) Aldin Šetkić	2	6^{0}
(Russia) Michail Elgin	6	3	6
(Italy) Daniele Giorgini	2	6	3
WC	(Slovakia) Norbert Gombos	1	2
7	(Romania) Adrian Ungur	6	6

Second Round
2	(Turkey) Marsel İlhan	3	7	6
(France) Nicolas Devilder	6	6^{4}	1
(Russia) Michail Elgin	3	3
7	(Romania) Adrian Ungur	6	6

Qualifying Competition
2	(Turkey) Marsel İlhan	4	0
7	(Romania) Adrian Ungur	6	6

=== Third qualifier ===
First Round
3	(Kazakhstan) Yuri Schukin	2	2^{r}
(Bosnia and Herzegovina) Mirza Bašić	6	3
(Romania) Adrian Cruciat	6	6
WC	(Slovenia) Martin Rmuš	1	3
(Romania) Victor Crivoi	0	0^{r}
(Italy) Thomas Fabbiano	6	4
(Israel) Amir Weintraub	3	1
6	(Croatia) Franko Škugor	6	6

Second Round
(Bosnia and Herzegovina) Mirza Bašić	6	7
(Romania) Adrian Cruciat	3	6^{2}
(Italy) Thomas Fabbiano	2	6^{1}
6	(Croatia) Franko Škugor	6	7

Qualifying Competition
(Bosnia and Herzegovina) Mirza Bašić	4	2
6	(Croatia) Franko Škugor	6	6

=== Fourth qualifier ===
First Round
4	(France) Vincent Millot	6	7
(Spain) Iñigo Cervantes-Huegun	4	6^{2}
(Croatia) Roko Karanušić	3	4
(Croatia) Antonio Veić	6	6
(Italy) Marco Crugnola	6	4	5
(Serbia) Miljan Zekić	4	6	7
(Italy) Gianluca Naso	4	4
5	(Slovakia) Martin Kližan	6	6

Second Round
4	(France) Vincent Millot	6^{5}	0
(Croatia) Antonio Veić	7	6
(Serbia) Miljan Zekić	3	5
5	(Slovakia) Martin Kližan	6	7

Qualifying Competition
(Croatia) Antonio Veić	5	2
5	(Slovakia) Martin Kližan	7	6
