= 2021 Serbia Open – Women's doubles =

Women's doubles
- 2021 Serbia Open

Final
- Champions: (Serbia) Aleksandra Krunić (Serbia) Nina Stojanović
- Runners-up: (Belgium) Greet Minnen (Belgium) Alison Van Uytvanck
- Score: 6–0, 6–2

Events
Singles	men	women
Doubles	men	women
Serbia Open

This was the first edition of the tournament.

Aleksandra Krunić and Nina Stojanović won the title, defeating Greet Minnen and Alison Van Uytvanck in the final, 6–0, 6–2.

== Seeds ==
1. (Japan) Shuko Aoyama / (Japan) Ena Shibahara (first round)
2. (Hungary) Tímea Babos / (Russia) Vera Zvonareva (semifinals)
3. (China) Xu Yifan / (China) Zhang Shuai (semifinals)
4. (Serbia) Aleksandra Krunić / (Serbia) Nina Stojanović (champions)

== Draw ==
=== Key ===
- Q = Qualifier
- WC = Wild card
- LL = Lucky loser
- Alt = Alternate
- SE = Special exempt
- PR = Protected ranking
- ITF = ITF entry
- JE = Junior exempt
- w/o = Walkover
- r = Retired
- d = Defaulted
- SR = Special ranking

=== Draw ===
First round
1	(Japan) S Aoyama (Japan) E Shibahara	3	6	[5]
(Belgium) G Minnen (Belgium) A Van Uytvanck	6	1	[10]
WC	(Serbia) I Jorović (Serbia) L Radivojević	0	1
(Slovenia) D Jakupović (Russia) Y Sizikova	6	6
3	(China) Y Xu (China) S Zhang	3	7^{7}	[10]
(Canada) G Dabrowski (Canada) LA Fernandez	6	6^{5}	[8]
(Japan) M Kato (Czech Republic) R Voráčová	6^{2}	7	[10]
Alt	(Colombia) C Osorio (United Kingdom) E Webley-Smith	7^{7}	5	[5]
(Belarus) L Marozava (Romania) A Mitu	6	4	[10]
(Romania) M Buzărnescu (India) A Raina	3	6	[5]
(Poland) P Kania-Choduń (Germany) J Wachaczyk	3	1
4	(Serbia) A Krunić (Serbia) N Stojanović	6	6
PR	(Russia) N Dzalamidze (Russia) I Khromacheva	7^{9}	6
(Sweden) C Lister (Poland) K Piter	6^{7}	3
(Spain) C Bucșa (Sweden) R Peterson	2	2
2	(Hungary) T Babos (Russia) V Zvonareva	6	6

Quarterfinals
(Belgium) G Minnen (Belgium) A Van Uytvanck	6	6
(Slovenia) D Jakupović (Russia) Y Sizikova	3	3
3	(China) Y Xu (China) S Zhang	6	7^{9}
(Japan) M Kato (Czech Republic) R Voráčová	1	6^{7}
(Belarus) L Marozava (Romania) A Mitu	2	6	[6]
4	(Serbia) A Krunić (Serbia) N Stojanović	6	3	[10]
PR	(Russia) N Dzalamidze (Russia) I Khromacheva	1	4
2	(Hungary) T Babos (Russia) V Zvonareva	6	6

Semifinals
(Belgium) G Minnen (Belgium) A Van Uytvanck	6	6
3	(China) Y Xu (China) S Zhang	2	1
4	(Serbia) A Krunić (Serbia) N Stojanović	6	6
2	(Hungary) T Babos (Russia) V Zvonareva	2	4

Final
(Belgium) G Minnen (Belgium) A Van Uytvanck	0	2
4	(Serbia) A Krunić (Serbia) N Stojanović	6	6
