= 2011 Serbia Open – Singles =

Singles
- 2011 Serbia Open

Final
- Champion: (Serbia) Novak Djokovic
- Runner-up: (Spain) Feliciano López
- Score: 7–6^{(7–4)}, 6–2

Events
Singles	Doubles
← 2010 ·	Serbia Open	· 2012 →

Novak Djokovic defeated Feliciano López in the final, 7–6^{(7–4)}, 6–2 to win the singles tennis title at the 2011 Serbia Open. It was his 27th consecutive win of the season.

Sam Querrey was the reigning champion, but chose not to participate this year.

== Seeds ==
The first four seeds received a bye in to the Second Round.

1. (Serbia) Novak Djokovic (champion)
2. (Serbia) Viktor Troicki (second round)
3. (Spain) Guillermo García-López (second round)
4. (Spain) Albert Montañés (quarterfinals)
5. (United States) John Isner (first round)
6. (Latvia) Ernests Gulbis (first round)
7. (Serbia) Janko Tipsarević (semifinals, withdrew due to right thigh injury)
8. (Argentina) Juan Mónaco (first round)

== Draw ==
=== Key ===
- Q = Qualifier
- WC = Wild card
- LL = Lucky loser
- Alt = Alternate
- SE = Special exempt
- PR = Protected ranking
- ITF = ITF entry
- JE = Junior exempt
- w/o = Walkover
- r = Retired
- d = Defaulted
- SR = Special ranking

=== Finals ===
Semifinals
1	(Serbia) Novak Djokovic	w/o
7	(Serbia) Janko Tipsarević
(Spain) Feliciano López	7	6
(Italy) Filippo Volandri	6^{3}	2

Final
1	(Serbia) Novak Djokovic	7	6
(Spain) Feliciano López	6^{4}	2

=== Top half ===
First round
Q	(Romania) A Ungur	6^{2}	6	6
(Spain) R Ramírez Hidalgo	7	3	4
(Germany) T Kamke	6^{0}	1
(Slovenia) B Kavčič	7	6
(Brazil) R Mello	6	7
5	(United States) J Isner	4	6^{4}
(Kazakhstan) M Kukushkin	6	4	2
(India) S Devvarman	1	6	6
SE	(Germany) M Zverev	7	3	6
(Israel) D Sela	6^{4}	6	3
(Japan) K Nishikori	6	2	6^{0}
7	(Serbia) J Tipsarević	2	6	7

Second round
1	(Serbia) N Djokovic	6	6
Q	(Romania) A Ungur	2	3
(Slovenia) B Kavčič	7	6
(Brazil) R Mello	5	3
3	(Spain) G García-López	6^{6}	6	6^{8}
(India) S Devvarman	7	2	7
SE	(Germany) M Zverev	2	0
7	(Serbia) J Tipsarević	6	6

Quarterfinals
1	(Serbia) N Djokovic	6	6
(Slovenia) B Kavčič	3	2
(India) S Devvarman	3	6	4
7	(Serbia) J Tipsarević	6	3	6

Semifinals
1	(Serbia) N Djokovic	w/o
7	(Serbia) J Tipsarević

=== Bottom half ===
First round
8	(Argentina) J Mónaco	4	5
(Spain) F López	6	7
WC	(Chile) F González	6	6
Q	(Slovakia) M Kližan	2	4
Q	(Austria) A Peya	6	3	4
(Germany) M Berrer	4	6	6
6/WC	(Latvia) E Gulbis	2	4
SE	(Ukraine) I Marchenko	6	6
(Italy) F Volandri	6	6
WC	(Serbia) D Lajović	1	4
(Spain) M Granollers	7	6
Q	(Croatia) F Škugor	5	1

Second round
(Spain) F López	6	7
WC	(Chile) F González	4	6^{4}
(Germany) M Berrer	6	2	2
4	(Spain) A Montañés	3	6	6
SE	(Ukraine) I Marchenko	3	6	3
(Italy) F Volandri	6	1	6
(Spain) M Granollers	6	6
2	(Serbia) V Troicki	2	3

Quarterfinals
(Spain) F López	6	6
4	(Spain) A Montañés	4	4
(Italy) F Volandri	6	6
(Spain) M Granollers	2	3

Semifinals
(Spain) F López	7	6
(Italy) F Volandri	6^{3}	2
