= 2011 Serbia Open – Doubles =

Men's doubles tennis competition

Doubles
- 2011 Serbia Open

Final
- Champions: (Czech Republic) František Čermák (Slovakia) Filip Polášek
- Runners-up: (Austria) Oliver Marach (Austria) Alexander Peya
- Score: 7–5, 6–2

Events
Singles	Doubles
← 2010 ·	Serbia Open	· 2012 →

Santiago González and Travis Rettenmaier were the defending champions, but Rettenmaier chose to play in the Estoril Open.
González teamed up with Igor Zelenay of Slovakia, but they were eliminated by František Čermák and Filip Polášek who eventually won the title; beating in the final the Austrian pair Oliver Marach and Alexander Peya 7–5, 6–2.

== Seeds ==
1. (Spain) Marcel Granollers / (Serbia) Nenad Zimonjić (semifinals)
2. (Israel) Jonathan Erlich / (Israel) Andy Ram (semifinals)
3. (Czech Republic) František Čermák / (Slovakia) Filip Polášek (champions)
4. (Austria) Oliver Marach / (Austria) Alexander Peya (final)

== Draw ==
=== Key ===
- Q = Qualifier
- WC = Wild card
- LL = Lucky loser
- Alt = Alternate
- SE = Special exempt
- PR = Protected ranking
- ITF = ITF entry
- JE = Junior exempt
- w/o = Walkover
- r = Retired
- d = Defaulted
- SR = Special ranking

=== Draw ===
First round
1	(Spain) M Granollers (Serbia) N Zimonjić	6	6
WC	(Serbia) D Savić (Serbia) M Zekić	3	2
(Japan) K Nishikori (Croatia) L Zovko	6	6
WC	(Serbia) I Bozoljac (Serbia) D Vemić	3	3
4	(Austria) O Marach (Austria) A Peya	6	7
(Russia) M Elgin (Kazakhstan) M Kukushkin	3	5
(Chinese Taipei) Y-h Lu (Germany) M Zverev	6	2	[10]
(Brazil) F Ferreiro (Brazil) A Sá	1	6	[7]
(United Kingdom) C Fleming (United States) D Martin	2	5
(Mexico) S González (Slovakia) I Zelenay	6	7
(United States) J Isner (Ukraine) I Marchenko	4	1
3	(Czech Republic) F Čermák (Slovakia) F Polášek	6	6
(Spain) G García-López (Spain) A Montañés	6	6
(Germany) M Emmrich (Germany) T Kamke	1	4
(India) S Devvarman (Philippines) TC Huey	3	6	[1]
2	(Israel) J Erlich (Israel) A Ram	6	2	[10]

Quarterfinals
1	(Spain) M Granollers (Serbia) N Zimonjić	6	6
(Japan) K Nishikori (Croatia) L Zovko	2	0
4	(Austria) O Marach (Austria) A Peya	6	6
(Chinese Taipei) Y-h Lu (Germany) M Zverev	3	3
(Mexico) S González (Slovakia) I Zelenay	4	4
3	(Czech Republic) F Čermák (Slovakia) F Polášek	6	6
(Spain) G García-López (Spain) A Montañés	2	0
2	(Israel) J Erlich (Israel) A Ram	6	6

Semifinals
1	(Spain) M Granollers (Serbia) N Zimonjić	0	4
4	(Austria) O Marach (Austria) A Peya	6	6
3	(Czech Republic) F Čermák (Slovakia) F Polášek	7	1	[10]
2	(Israel) J Erlich (Israel) A Ram	5	6	[5]

Finals
4	(Austria) O Marach (Austria) A Peya	5	2
3	(Czech Republic) F Čermák (Slovakia) F Polášek	7	6
