= 2021 Serbia Open – Women's singles =

Women's singles
- 2021 Serbia Open

Final
- Champion: (Spain) Paula Badosa
- Runner-up: (Croatia) Ana Konjuh
- Score: 6–2, 2–0, ret.

Details
- Draw: 32 (6 Q / 4 WC )
- Seeds: 8

Events
Singles	men	women
Doubles	men	women
- Serbia Open

This was the first edition of the tournament.

Paula Badosa won her first WTA singles title without dropping a set throughout the entire tournament, after Ana Konjuh retired from the final with the scoreline at 6–2, 2–0.

This was Konjuh’s first tour-level final since 2017 ASB Classic tournament following her comeback from injury.

== Seeds ==
1. (Russia) Anastasia Pavlyuchenkova (withdrew)
2. (Kazakhstan) Yulia Putintseva (second round)
3. (China) Zhang Shuai (first round)
4. (Spain) Paula Badosa (champion)
5. (Argentina) Nadia Podoroska (quarterfinals)
6. (France) Kristina Mladenovic (first round)
7. (Sweden) Rebecca Peterson (quarterfinals)
8. (Montenegro) Danka Kovinić (first round)

== Draw ==
Key

- Q = Qualifier
- WC = Wild card
- LL = Lucky loser
- Alt = Alternate
- ITF = ITF entry
- PR = Protected ranking
- SR = Special ranking
- SE = Special exempt
- JE = Junior exempt
- JR = Junior Accelerator Programme entrant
- CO = College Accelerator Programme entrant
- NG = Next Gen Accelerator Program entrant
- w/o = Walkover
- r = Retired
- d = Defaulted

=== Finals ===
Semifinals
LL	(Bulgaria) Viktoriya Tomova	1	2
4	(Spain) Paula Badosa	6	6
Q	(Colombia) Camila Osorio	6^{6}	6^{4}
Q	(Croatia) Ana Konjuh	7^{8}	7^{7}

Final
4	(Spain) Paula Badosa	6	2
Q	(Croatia) Ana Konjuh	2	0^{r}

=== Top half ===
First round
LL	(Bulgaria) V Tomova	6	6
WC	(Serbia) L Radivojević	2	3
(Canada) LA Fernandez	7	6
(Slovenia) P Hercog	5	1
Q	(Hungary) RL Jani	6	0	7
(Czech Republic) T Martincová	2	6	5
(Russia) A Kalinskaya	6	7^{8}
6	(France) K Mladenovic	0	6^{6}
4	(Spain) P Badosa	6	6
PR	(Germany) A Petkovic	2	3
(Romania) PM Țig	6	5	2
PR	(Romania) M Buzărnescu	4	7	6
WC	(Serbia) I Jorović	4	3
(Australia) A Tomljanović	6	6
(Serbia) N Stojanović	7	1	0
7	(Sweden) R Peterson	5	6	6

Second round
LL	(Bulgaria) V Tomova	6	4	6
(Canada) LA Fernandez	3	6	2
Q	(Hungary) RL Jani	4	6	6
(Russia) A Kalinskaya	6	1	3
4	(Spain) P Badosa	6	6
PR	(Romania) M Buzărnescu	0	4
(Australia) A Tomljanović	6	2	1^{r}
7	(Sweden) R Peterson	4	6	2

Quarterfinals
LL	(Bulgaria) V Tomova	6	2	7
Q	(Hungary) RL Jani	1	6	5
4	(Spain) P Badosa	6	6
7	(Sweden) R Peterson	2	4

Semifinals
LL	(Bulgaria) V Tomova	1	2
4	(Spain) P Badosa	6	6

=== Bottom half ===
First round
8	(Montenegro) D Kovinić	6	4	1
Q	(Spain) C Bucșa	3	6	6
(Belarus) A Sasnovich	6^{6}	6	6
Q	(China) Xiy Wang	7^{8}	0	2
WC	(Serbia) O Danilović	2	4
Q	(Russia) K Rakhimova	6	6
Q	(Colombia) C Osorio	6	1	7^{7}
3	(China) S Zhang	2	6	6^{4}
5	(Argentina) N Podoroska	6	4	6
(Hungary) T Babos	2	6	3
(Czech Republic) Kr Plíšková	3	5
(France) O Dodin	6	7
(Belgium) A Van Uytvanck	2	6	5
Q	(Croatia) A Konjuh	6	1	7
(Slovenia) K Juvan	6	2	1
2	(Kazakhstan) Y Putintseva	4	6	6

Second round
Q	(Spain) C Bucșa	4	7	0
(Belarus) A Sasnovich	6	5	6
Q	(Russia) K Rakhimova	6	3	4
Q	(Colombia) C Osorio	4	6	6
5	(Argentina) N Podoroska	6	6
(France) O Dodin	2	3
Q	(Croatia) A Konjuh	6	6
2	(Kazakhstan) Y Putintseva	3	4

Quarterfinals
(Belarus) A Sasnovich	4	2
Q	(Colombia) C Osorio	6	6
5	(Argentina) N Podoroska	4	3
Q	(Croatia) A Konjuh	6	6

Semifinals
Q	(Colombia) C Osorio	6^{6}	6^{4}
Q	(Croatia) A Konjuh	7^{8}	7^{7}

== Qualifying ==
=== Seeds ===
1. (Colombia) Camila Osorio (qualified)
2. (Bulgaria) Viktoriya Tomova (qualifying competition, lucky loser)
3. (China) Wang Xiyu (qualified)
4. (Russia) Kamilla Rakhimova (qualified)
5. (Romania) Jaqueline Cristian (qualifying competition)
6. (Spain) Nuria Párrizas Díaz (first round)
7. (Spain) Cristina Bucșa (qualified)
8. (Russia) Anastasia Gasanova (qualifying competition)
9. (China) You Xiaodi (qualifying competition)
10. (Croatia) Ana Konjuh (qualified)
11. (Chile) Daniela Seguel (qualifying competition)
12. (Serbia) Aleksandra Krunić (first round)

=== Qualifiers ===
1. (Colombia) Camila Osorio
2. (Croatia) Ana Konjuh
3. (China) Wang Xiyu
4. (Russia) Kamilla Rakhimova
5. (Hungary) Réka Luca Jani
6. (Spain) Cristina Bucșa

=== Lucky loser ===
1. (Bulgaria) Viktoriya Tomova

=== Qualifying draw ===
==== First qualifier ====
First round
1	(Colombia) Camila Osorio	6	6^{7}	6
(Hungary) Dalma Gálfi	3	7^{9}	4
WC	(Serbia) Draginja Vuković	0	1
9	(China) You Xiaodi	6	6

Qualifying competition
1	(Colombia) Camila Osorio	6	6
9	(China) You Xiaodi	4	3

==== Second qualifier ====
First round
2	(Bulgaria) Viktoriya Tomova	7^{10}	6
(Turkey) Pemra Özgen	6^{8}	0
(Germany) Jule Niemeier	7^{9}	4	3
10	(Croatia) Ana Konjuh	6^{7}	6	6

Qualifying competition
2	(Bulgaria) Viktoriya Tomova	7	2	2
10	(Croatia) Ana Konjuh	5	6	6

==== Third qualifier ====
First round
3	(China) Wang Xiyu	6	6
WC	(Czech Republic) Linda Nosková	1	1
(Belgium) Lara Salden	5	6^{5}
11	(Chile) Daniela Seguel	7	7^{7}

Qualifying competition
3	(China) Wang Xiyu	6	6
11	(Chile) Daniela Seguel	3	3

==== Fourth qualifier ====
First round
4	(Russia) Kamilla Rakhimova	6	6
WC	(Serbia) Iva Šepa	0	3
WC	(Serbia) Elena Milovanović	3	1
8	(Russia) Anastasia Gasanova	6	6

Qualifying competition
4	(Russia) Kamilla Rakhimova	7	7^{8}
8	(Russia) Anastasia Gasanova	5	6^{6}

==== Fifth qualifier ====
First round
5	(Romania) Jaqueline Cristian	6	0	6
(Croatia) Tena Lukas	0	6	4
(Hungary) Réka Luca Jani	6	6^{2}	6
12	(Serbia) Aleksandra Krunić	3	7^{7}	4

Qualifying competition
5	(Romania) Jaqueline Cristian	7	2	1
(Hungary) Réka Luca Jani	5	6	6

==== Sixth qualifier ====
First round
6	(Spain) Nuria Párrizas Díaz	4	1
(Serbia) Dejana Radanović	6	6
(Belarus) Yuliya Hatouka	3	1
7	(Spain) Cristina Bucșa	6	6

Qualifying competition
(Serbia) Dejana Radanović	4	0^{r}
7	(Spain) Cristina Bucșa	6	2
