= Srdjan Djokovic =

Serbian businessman

- Срђан Ђоковић
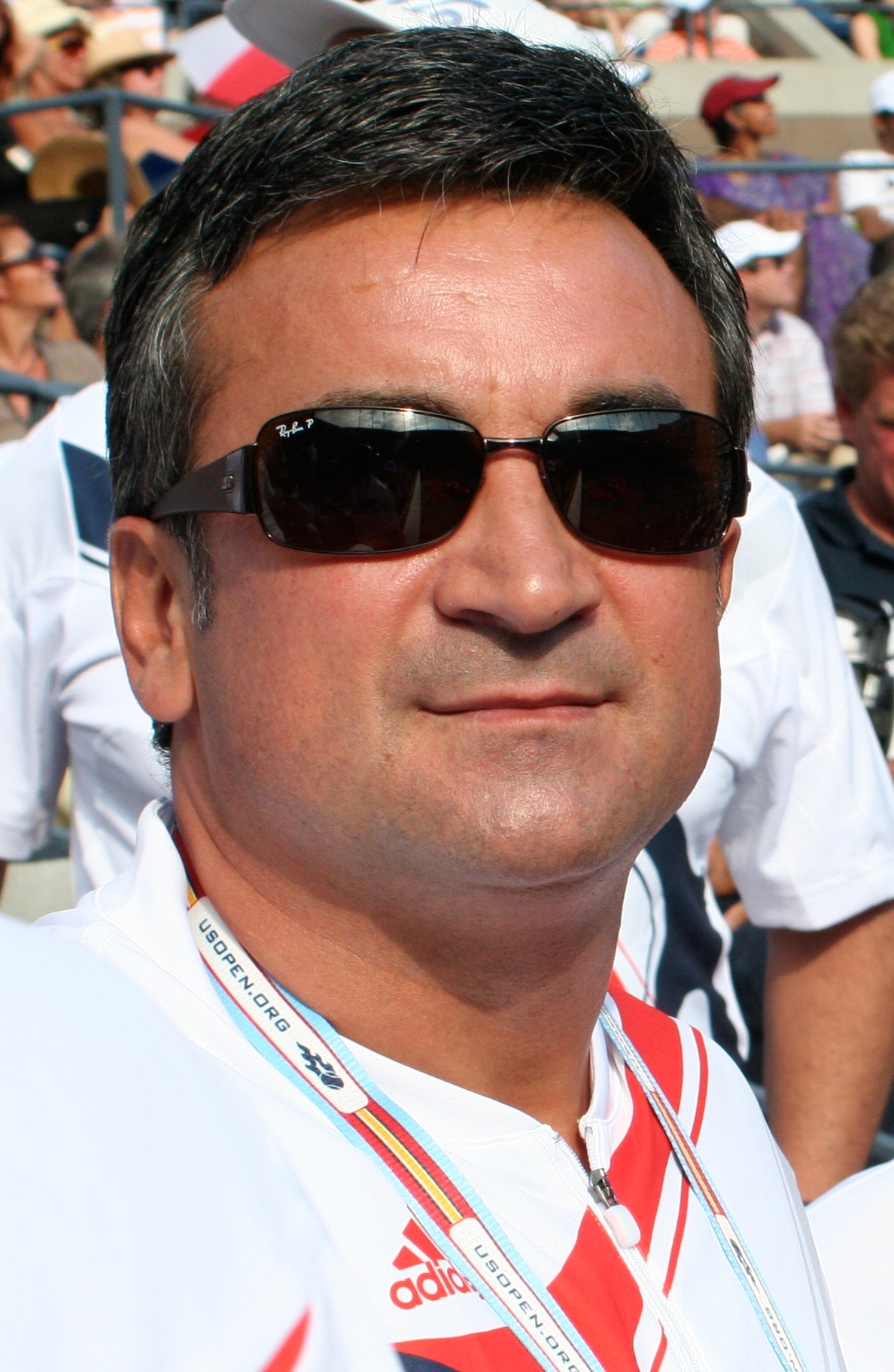
- Djokovic at the 2007 US Open
- Born: 25 April 1961 (age 65); Kosovska Mitrovica, FPR Yugoslavia
- Occupations: Entrepreneur, former skier and ski instructor
- Children: Sons Novak, Marko, Djordje

Srdjan Djokovic (Serbian: Срђан Ђоковић / Srđan Đoković; born 25 April 1961) is a Serbian entrepreneur and former professional skier and skiing coach. He is best known as the father of tennis players Novak, Djordje, and Marko Djokovic.

== Early life and education ==
Djokovic is an ethnic Serb born in Mitrovica to parents Stanka and Vladimir, and grew up in the nearby town of Zvečan, Kosovo, which at the time was part of the Yugoslav Republic of Serbia. He has a sister, Jelena, and a younger brother, Goran. After completing high school, he moved to Belgrade to study law, but did not finish the studies. Later on, the whole family moved to Belgrade. During winters, he worked as a ski coach in the winter resorts of Kopaonik and Brezovica, where he met his future wife Dijana Žagar in 1986. They are the parents of three sons: Novak (born 1987), Marko (born 1991), and Djordje (born 1995).

== Career ==
Djokovic is a former professional skier and ski coach, who worked in the Kopaonik ski resort, Serbia's leading ski resort and a popular tourist destination in the mountains 250 kilometers (155 miles) south of Belgrade. He is currently the owner-operator of the Red Bull pizza restaurant and a sports shop in the Serbian mountains. He opened the restaurant, which has no connection to the drinks company with the same name, in the late 1980s, and it still exists to this day. While some accounts describe Djokovic as a former player at the Serbian football club FK Trepča, the 2022 book Ein Leben lang im Krieg (English: A lifetime at war) by Daniel Müksch reports a lack of supporting evidence of this.

In 2011, Djokovic attempted to unseat Serbia Tennis Federation president Slobodan Živojinović, but ultimately failed to do so.

== Role in Novak's upbringing ==
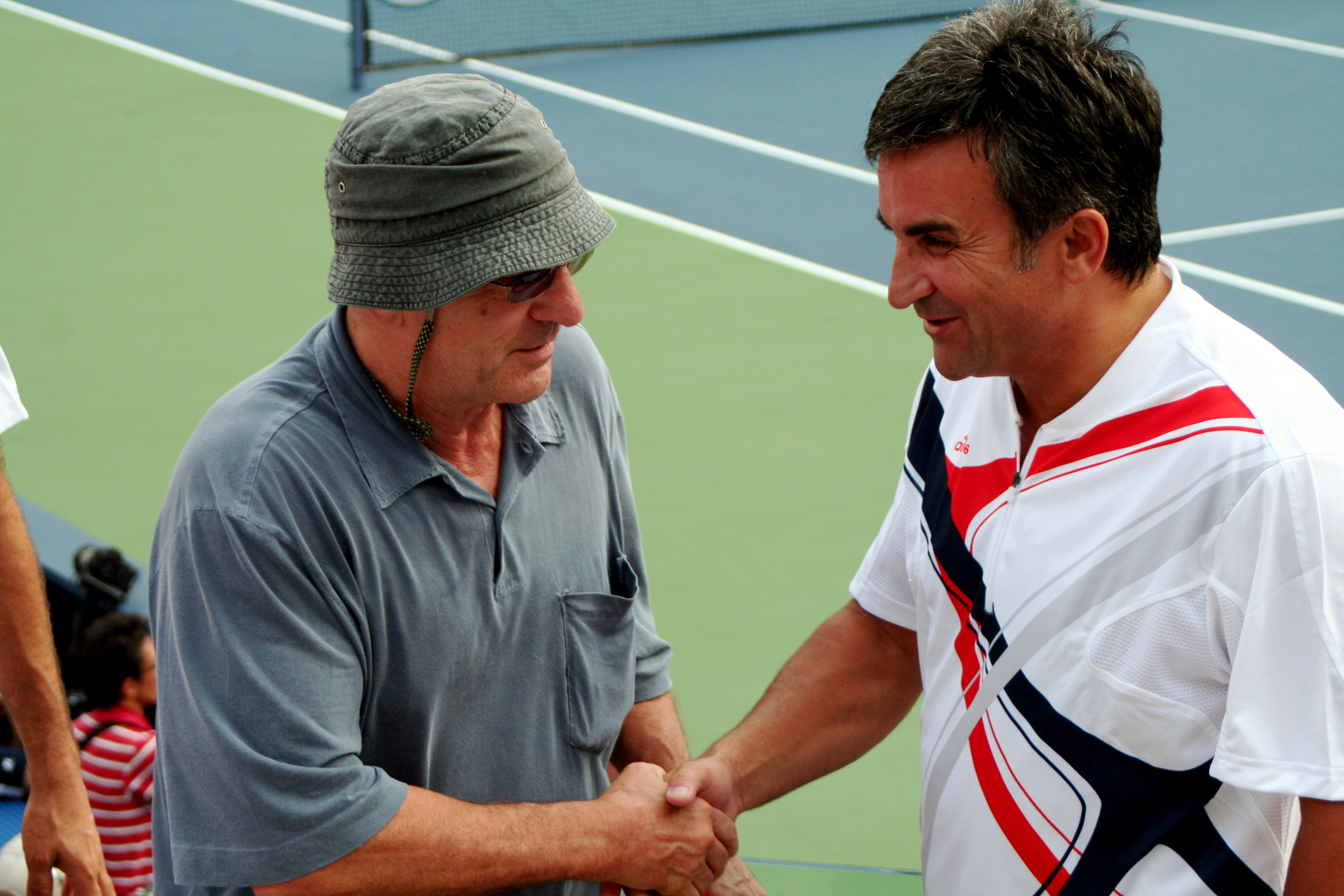
Robert De Niro (left) and Srdjan Djokovic (right) at the 2007 US Open

When Novak was four, Djokovic and his wife gave him a mini-racket and a soft foam ball, which became "the most beloved toy in his life". Djokovic taught him to ski from a very early age, but it was tennis that won him over, so he and his wife sent him to a tennis camp in Novi Sad. Because of his job in the Kopaonik ski resort, Djokovic and his family spent the summer and winter vacations in Mount Kopaonik, and it was there that the state-owned Yugoslav company Genex, which developed much of Kopaonik, chose to build three tennis courts just across the parking lot from where the Djokovics opened their Red Bull restaurant. In the summer of 1993, he allowed the six-year-old Novak to join a tennis camp that was being held on those courts by the Teniski Klub Partizan, under the supervision of Yugoslav tennis player Jelena Genčić.

Since no one in the Djokovic family had a tennis background, his parents asked experts whether Novak had sufficient potential and talent to pursue a tennis career and whether they should invest in it; ultimately it was Genčić who gave them those assurances, telling them that they had "a golden child". Genčić's words were the ones that Djokovic and his wife repeated amongst themselves to help justify the sacrifices they would go on to make for Novak's career. After the summer camp ended, Novak and Genčić began training together intensively at Belgrade's Partizan Tennis Club. Since Djokovic and Dijana at the time were focused on Kopaonik and working at the restaurant, they asked Djokovic's brother Goran to occasionally drop Novak off and pick him up from training in Belgrade and to also accompany him to local tournaments.

During the NATO bombing of Yugoslavia in 1999, Djokovic and his family spent several hours in the basement and in shelters during the first few nights before eventually deciding to go on living their old routines as normal as possible. On 22 May, Djokovic and his family were celebrating Novak's 12th birthday at the Partizan club when an air strike began while he and his wife were singing Happy Birthday to You. Talking about his parents, Novak stated: "My mother is a rock who kept the family together in the toughest moments. My father is the driving force of the family, someone who has instilled in me such power of belief and positive thinking".

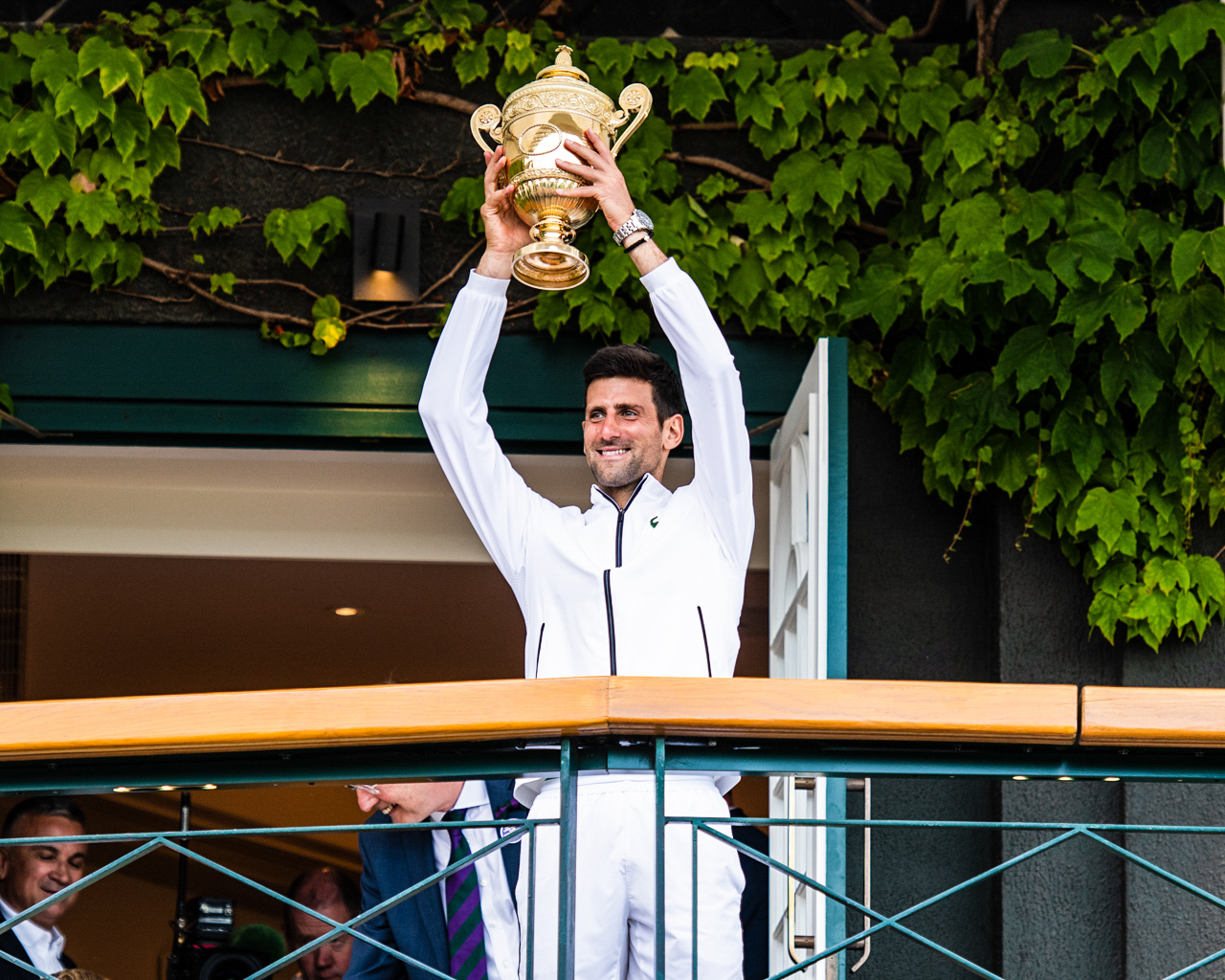
Djokovic's son Novak in Wimbledon, 2019.

Due to his rapid development, Genčić advised Djokovic and Dijana that if they wanted him to keep progressing, he had to leave the country. To that end, Genčić contacted Nikola Pilić and in September 1999 the 12-year-old moved to the Pilić tennis academy in Germany, spending four years there. At that time, a difficult economic and political situation was looming over Serbia, so the decision to let Novak move to Germany was difficult, but it was the only logical thing to do. Djokovic acted on Genčić's assessment, and in addition to Germany, he also took his son to train at academies in the United States and Italy. The travel and training were a financial drain on the family, and although Pilić offered a special price of 5,000 Deutsche Marks a month, it was still much more than what the Djokovic family could afford, so he tried unsuccessfully to look for sponsors and even investors, but no one was willing to sign a contract. At one point, he convinced Serbian businessman Filip Cepter to agree to cover the costs of Novak's stay at the Pilic Academy, but this large financial aid ended up never happening because of Slobodan "Boba" Živojinović, a former tennis player, who allegedly told Cepter that "Novak is good, but he has a sick heart, a sick heel and a dad who is impossible to cooperate with".

Djokovic ultimately decided to take out high-interest loans to help pay for his son's tennis education, which naturally put Novak under immense pressure to deliver. He borrowed money at absurdly high-interest rates, once at 10 percent per year, another time at 15 percent. Djokovic gambled and bet everything on his son. If Novak had not made it as a professional, the family would have been ruined. Djokovic and his wife put all of their resources and assets to help Novak, so much so that they sacrificed and neglected their other kids. In a rare television interview, Djokovic said of his second and third sons: "I tried to discourage them, but to no avail. Their own brother is the greatest idol to them. They do not have to look elsewhere. They are trying hard and want to be like Novak".

In 2022, Djokovic criticised the Government of Australia for not letting Novak enter the country due to COVID-19 public health rules. On 6 January, the eve of Orthodox Christmas day, Djokovic compared his son's detention in Australia to the Crucifixion of Jesus.

== Controversy ==
In January 2023, he was seen during the Australian Open tennis tournament near the Rod Laver Arena with a pro-Vladimir Putin motorcycle gang called the Night Wolves. Vasyl Myroshnychenko, the Ukrainian ambassador to Australia, called for Djokovic to be banned from the subsequent tennis match in the competition. Djokovic subsequently stated that he would not attend the January 27 semi-final to avoid disrupting it. Srdjan Djokovic later stated that he did not intend to post with the pro-Russian gangsters and mistakenly thought he was posing for photos with Serbian tennis fans.

== Sources ==
- Wilbon, Michael (2012). The Best American Sports Writing 2012. Houghton Mifflin Harcourt. ISBN 978-0547336978.
- Biographies, Belmont and Belcourt (August 2012). Novak Djokovic: An Unauthorized Biography. Price World Publishing. ISBN 978-1-61984-179-6.
- Schurman, Kyle (6 October 2011). Novak Djokovic Bio: A Perfect Season?. Hyperink Inc. ISBN 978-1-61464-546-7.
- Bowers, Chris (2014). The Sporting Statesman - Novak Djokovic and the Rise of Serbia. London: Kings Road Publishing. ISBN 9781782197706.
