= Mateusz Kowalczyk (tennis) =

Polish tennis player

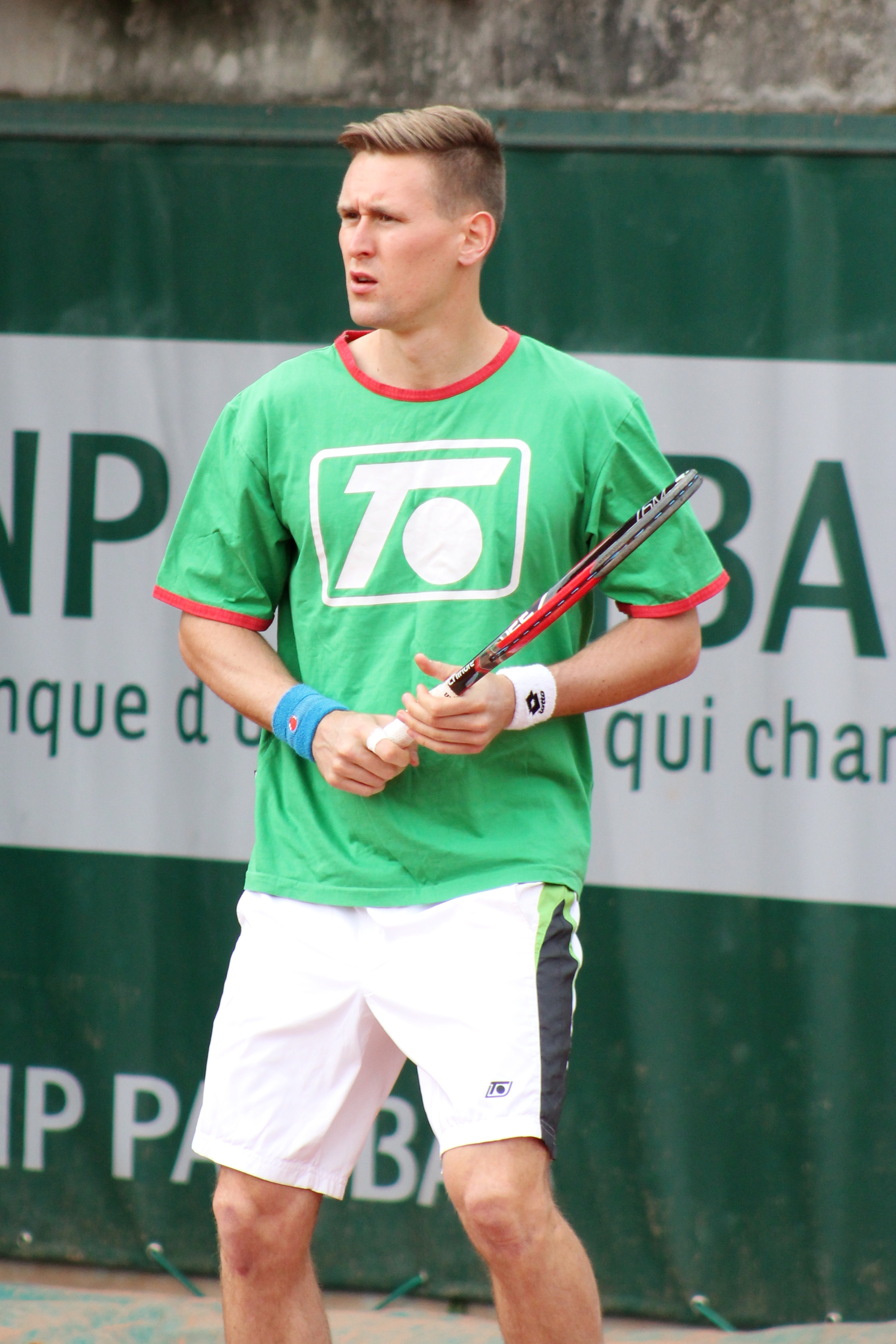
- Mateusz Kowalczyk practicing at Roland Garros 2013
- Country (sports): Poland
- Residence: Zabrze, Poland
- Born: 3 May 1987 (age 38) Chrzanów, Polish People's Republic
- Turned pro: 2005
- Retired: 2020 (last match played)
- Plays: Right-handed
- Prize money: US$ 276,091

Singles
- Career record: 0–0
- Career titles: 0
- Highest ranking: No. 694 (12 October 2009)

Doubles
- Career record: 13–21
- Career titles: 1
- Highest ranking: No. 77 (9 September 2013)

Grand Slam doubles results
- Australian Open: –
- French Open: 1R (2010, 2013)
- Wimbledon: 2R (2013)
- US Open: –

Mateusz Kowalczyk (Polish pronunciation: [maˈtɛ.uʂ kɔˈvalt͡ʂɨk]; born 3 May 1987) is a Polish former tennis player who specialises in doubles.

== Career ==
He reached his highest doubles ranking of world no. 77 on 9 September 2013. He has played with Tomasz Bednarek, Błażej Koniusz, Marcin Gawron, and Artem Sitak.

== ATP career finals ==
=== Doubles: 3 (1 title, 2 runner-ups) ===
Legend Grand Slam tournaments (0–0) ATP World Tour Finals (0–0) ATP World Tour Masters 1000 (0–0) ATP World Tour 500 Series (0–0) ATP World Tour 250 Series (1–2)	Titles by surface Hard (0–0) Clay (1–2) Grass (0–0)	Titles by setting Outdoor (1–2) Indoor (0–0)

Result	W–L	Date	Tournament	Tier	Surface	Partner	Opponents	Score
Loss	0–1	May 2010	Serbia Open, Serbia	250 Series	Clay	(Poland) Tomasz Bednarek	(Mexico) Santiago González (United States) Travis Rettenmaier	6–7^{(6–8)}, 1–6
Loss	0–2	Jul 2013	Stuttgart Open, Germany	250 Series	Clay	(Poland) Tomasz Bednarek	(Argentina) Facundo Bagnis (Brazil) Thomaz Bellucci	6–2, 4–6, [9–11]
Win	1–2	Jul 2014	Stuttgart Open, Germany	250 Series	Clay	(New Zealand) Artem Sitak	(Spain) Guillermo García López (Austria) Philipp Oswald	2–6, 6–1, [10–7]

== Challengers and futures titles (18) ==
Legend
Challengers (10)
Futures (8)

No.	Date	Tournament	Surface	Partner	Opponents in the final	Score
1.	6 August 2007	Poland F5	Clay	(Poland) Błażej Koniusz	(Poland) Dawid Celt (Poland) Marcin Gawron	6–4, 6–2
2.	27 August 2007	Poland F8	Clay	(Poland) Błażej Koniusz	(Monaco) Benjamin Balleret (France) Clément Morel	6–1, 6–1
3.	16 June 2008	Bytom	Clay	(Poland) Marcin Gawron	(Australia) Raphael Durek (Poland) Błażej Koniusz	6–4, 3–6, [10–7]
4.	18 August 2008	Poland F5	Clay	(Poland) Jerzy Janowicz	(Poland) Andrzej Grusiecki (Poland) Andriej Kapaś	6–1, 6–4
5.	4 May 2009	Czech F1	Clay	(Russia) Andrey Kuznetsov	(Czech Republic) Michal Tabara (Czech Republic) Roman Vögeli	4–6, 7–6^{(5)}, [10–8]
6.	18 May 2009	Poland F1	Clay	(Poland) Jerzy Janowicz	(Russia) Denis Matsukevich (Russia) Valery Rudnev	6–3, 6–3
7.	3 August 2009	Slovakia F1	Clay	(Poland) Grzegorz Panfil	(Austria) Richard Ruckelshausen (Austria) Bertram Steinberger	6–4, 7–6^{(6)}
8.	14 September 2009	Szczecin	Clay	(Poland) Tomasz Bednarek	(Ukraine) Oleksandr Dolgopolov Jr. (Ukraine) Artem Smirnov	6–3, 6–4
9.	1 October 2008	Mexico F10	Hard	(Poland) Marcin Gawron	(United States) James Ludlow (France) Antoine Tassart	2–6, 6–4, [10–5]
10.	5 October 2009	Tarragona	Clay	(Poland) Tomasz Bednarek	(Italy) Flavio Cipolla (Italy) Alessandro Motti	6–1, 6–1
11.	19 October 2009	Florianópolis	Clay	(Poland) Tomasz Bednarek	(Spain) Daniel Gimeno Traver (Spain) Pere Riba	6–1, 6–4
12.	12 April 2010	Rome	Clay	(Poland) Tomasz Bednarek	(South Africa) Jeff Coetzee (United States) Jesse Witten	6–4, 7–6^{(4)}
13.	8 August 2011	Bydgoszcz	Clay	(Poland) Andriej Kapaś	(Poland) Piotr Gadomski (Poland) Maciej Smola	7–5, 6–4
14.	8 October 2011	Palermo	Clay	(Poland) Tomasz Bednarek	(Belarus) Aliaksandr Bury (Belarus) Andrei Vasilevski	6–2, 6–4
15.	17 June 2012	Košice	Clay	(Poland) Tomasz Bednarek	(Belarus) Uladzimir Ignatik (Belarus) Andrei Vasilevski	2–6, 7–5, [14–12]
16.	3 June 2012	Marburg	Clay	(Czech Republic) David Škoch	(Russia) Denis Matsukevich (Germany) Mischa Zverev	6–2, 6–1
17.	7 July 2012	Braunschweig	Clay	(Poland) Tomasz Bednarek	(Finland) Harri Heliövaara (Ukraine) Denys Molchanov	7–5, 6–7^{(1–7)}, [10–8]
18.	6 July 2013	Braunschweig	Clay	(Poland) Tomasz Bednarek	(Sweden) Andreas Siljeström (Slovakia) Igor Zelenay	6–2, 7–6^{(7–4)}
