= Djordje Djokovic =

Serbian tennis player (born 1995)

- Country (sports): Serbia
- Born: 17 July 1995 (age 30)
- Retired: 2015 (last match played)
- Plays: Right-handed (two-handed backhand)
- Prize money: US$ 20,720

Singles
- Career record: 0–0
- Career titles: 0
- Highest ranking: No. 1463 (9 September 2013)

Doubles
- Career record: 1–1
- Career titles: 0
- Highest ranking: No. 559 (2 May 2016)

Djordje Djokovic (Serbian Cyrillic: Ђорђе Ђоковић, romanized: Đorđe Đoković; born 17 July 1995) is a Serbian former tennis player and tournament director of the Serbia Open, held at his brother Novak's Novak Tennis Center. He is the youngest son of Dijana and Srđan Đoković. He is the younger brother of Novak and Marko Djokovic.

== Tennis career ==
Djordje Djokovic's highest professional accomplishment to date is reaching the doubles quarterfinals at the 2015 China Open.

== Personal life ==
On September 12, 2022, Djordje married Aleksandra Saska Veselinov, niece of Dragan Veselinov, former Serbian Minister of Agriculture.

== Career statistics ==
=== Challengers and futures finals ===
==== Doubles 1 (1–0) ====
Legend
Challengers (0–0)
Futures (1–0)

Outcome	#	Date	Tournament	Surface	Partner	Opponents	Score
Winner	1.	20 July 2013	Belgrade, Serbia F5	Clay	(United Kingdom) Matthew Short	(Croatia) Ivan Sabanov (Croatia) Matej Sabanov	7–5, 6–3
