= 2021 Serbia Open =

ATP tennis tournament

- Date: 19–25 April (men); 17–23 May (women)
- Edition: 5th (men); 1st (women)
- Category: ATP Tour 250 (men); WTA 250 (women)
- Draw: 28S / 16D (men); 32S / 16D (women)
- Prize money: €711,800 (men) $235,238 (women)
- Surface: Clay
- Location: Belgrade, Serbia
- Venue: Novak Tennis Center

Champions

Men's singles
- (Italy) Matteo Berrettini

Women's singles
- (Spain) Paula Badosa

Men's doubles
- (Croatia) Ivan Sabanov / (Croatia) Matej Sabanov

Women's doubles
- (Serbia) Aleksandra Krunić / (Serbia) Nina Stojanović
- Serbia Open

The 2021 Serbia Open was a tennis tournament played on outdoor clay courts. It was the 5th and 1st edition of the event for male and female professional tennis players, respectively. It was part of the 2021 ATP Tour and the 2021 WTA Tour and took place in Belgrade, Serbia; in mid-April for men and mid-May for women. A second ATP tournament, called the Belgrade Open, was played in men's singles the week before the French Open.

== Champions ==
=== Men's singles ===
- (Italy) Matteo Berrettini def. (Russia) Aslan Karatsev, 6–1, 3–6, 7–6^{(7–0)}

=== Women's singles ===
- (Spain) Paula Badosa def. (Croatia) Ana Konjuh 6–2, 2–0, ret.

=== Men's doubles ===
- (Croatia) Ivan Sabanov / (Croatia) Matej Sabanov def. (Uruguay) Ariel Behar / (Ecuador) Gonzalo Escobar, 6–3, 7–6^{(7–5)}

=== Women's doubles ===
- (Serbia) Aleksandra Krunić / (Serbia) Nina Stojanović def. (Belgium) Greet Minnen / (Belgium) Alison Van Uytvanck 6–0, 6–2

== Points and prize money ==
=== Point distribution ===
Event	W	F	SF	QF	Round of 16	Round of 32	Q	Q2	Q1
Singles	250	150	90	45	20	0	12	6	0
Doubles	250	150	90	45	0	—N/a	—N/a	—N/a	—N/a

=== Prize money ===
Event	W	F	SF	QF	Round of 16	Round of 32	Q2	Q1
Singles	€100,225	€58,885	€34,710	€19,840	€11,480	€6,710	€3,280	€1,705
Doubles*	€34,510	€18,590	€10,560	€6,030	€3,550	—N/a	—N/a	—N/a

_{*per team}

== ATP singles main draw entrants ==
=== Seeds ===
Country	Player	Rank^{1}	Seed
SRB	Novak Djokovic	1	1
ITA	Matteo Berrettini	10	2
RUS	Aslan Karatsev	29	3
SRB	Dušan Lajović	31	4
SRB	Filip Krajinović	37	5
~~HUN~~	~~Márton Fucsovics~~	~~40~~	~~6~~
AUS	John Millman	44	7
SRB	Miomir Kecmanović	47	8
SRB	Laslo Đere	49	9

- ^{1} Rankings are as of 12 April 2021

=== Other entrants ===
The following players received wildcards into the main draw:

- (Serbia) Nikola Milojević
- (Serbia) Danilo Petrović
- (Serbia) Viktor Troicki

The following players received entry from the qualifying draw:

- (Argentina) Facundo Bagnis
- (Argentina) Francisco Cerúndolo
- (Italy) Gianluca Mager
- (France) Arthur Rinderknech

The following players received entry as lucky losers:

- (Spain) Roberto Carballés Baena
- (Japan) Taro Daniel
- (Portugal) João Sousa

=== Withdrawals ===
Before the tournament

- (Croatia) Borna Ćorić → replaced by (Argentina) Federico Delbonis
- (Uruguay) Pablo Cuevas → replaced by (Portugal) João Sousa
- (Hungary) Márton Fucsovics → replaced by (Spain) Roberto Carballés Baena
- (France) Gaël Monfils → replaced by (Argentina) Federico Coria
- (Japan) Yoshihito Nishioka → replaced by (South Korea) Kwon Soon-woo
- (Finland) Emil Ruusuvuori → replaced by (Japan) Taro Daniel
- (Austria) Dominic Thiem → replaced by (Argentina) Juan Ignacio Londero
- (Spain) Fernando Verdasco → replaced by (Australia) Alexei Popyrin
- (Czech Republic) Jiří Veselý → replaced by (Italy) Marco Cecchinato
- (Switzerland) Stan Wawrinka → replaced by (Lithuania) Ričardas Berankis

== ATP doubles main draw entrants ==
=== Seeds ===
Country	Player	Country	Player	Rank^{1}	Seed
~~CRO~~	~~Nikola Mektić~~	~~CRO~~	~~Mate Pavić~~	~~5~~	~~1~~
USA	Austin Krajicek	AUT	Oliver Marach	71	2
RSA	Raven Klaasen	JPN	Ben McLachlan	71	3
ESA	Marcelo Arévalo	NED	Matwé Middelkoop	93	4

- Rankings are as of 12 April 2021

=== Other entrants ===
The following pairs received wildcards into the doubles main draw:

- (Serbia) Miomir Kecmanović / (Serbia) Dušan Lajović
- (Croatia) Ivan Sabanov / (Croatia) Matej Sabanov

The following pair received entry as an alternate:

- (New Zealand) Artem Sitak / (Italy) Stefano Travaglia

=== Withdrawals ===
Before the tournament

- (Croatia) Nikola Mektić / (Croatia) Mate Pavić → (New Zealand) Artem Sitak / (Italy) Stefano Travaglia
- (Monaco) Hugo Nys / (Germany) Tim Pütz → (Italy) Matteo Berrettini / (Italy) Andrea Vavassori

=== Retirements ===
- (India) Rohan Bopanna / (Uruguay) Pablo Cuevas

== WTA singles main draw entrants ==
=== Seeds ===
Country	Player	Rank^{1}	Seed
~~RUS~~	~~Anastasia Pavlyuchenkova~~	~~30~~	~~1~~
KAZ	Yulia Putintseva	34	2
CHN	Zhang Shuai	41	3
ESP	Paula Badosa	42	4
ARG	Nadia Podoroska	44	5
FRA	Kristina Mladenovic	53	6
SWE	Rebecca Peterson	61	7
MNE	Danka Kovinić	62	8

- ^{1} Rankings are as of 10 May 2021

=== Other entrants ===
The following players received wildcards into the main draw:

- (Serbia) Olga Danilović
- (Serbia) Ivana Jorović
- (Serbia) Lola Radivojević

The following players received entry using a protected ranking:

- (Romania) Mihaela Buzărnescu
- (Germany) Andrea Petkovic

The following players received entry from the qualifying draw:

- (Spain) Cristina Bucșa
- (Hungary) Réka Luca Jani
- (Croatia) Ana Konjuh
- (Colombia) Camila Osorio
- (Russia) Kamilla Rakhimova
- (China) Wang Xiyu

The following player received entry as a lucky loser:

- (Bulgaria) Viktoriya Tomova

=== Withdrawals ===
Before the tournament

- (Netherlands) Kiki Bertens → replaced by (Belarus) Aliaksandra Sasnovich
- (Romania) Sorana Cîrstea → replaced by (Slovenia) Kaja Juvan
- (France) Fiona Ferro → replaced by (Russia) Anna Kalinskaya
- (Russia) Svetlana Kuznetsova → replaced by (Czech Republic) Kristýna Plíšková
- (Poland) Magda Linette → replaced by (Australia) Ajla Tomljanović
- (Russia) Anastasia Pavlyuchenkova → replaced by (Bulgaria) Viktoriya Tomova
- (Kazakhstan) Elena Rybakina → replaced by (Slovenia) Polona Hercog
- (Latvia) Anastasija Sevastova → replaced by (Czech Republic) Tereza Martincová
- (Germany) Laura Siegemund → replaced by (Hungary) Tímea Babos
- (Croatia) Donna Vekić → replaced by (Germany) Andrea Petkovic
- (China) Zheng Saisai → replaced by (Serbia) Nina Stojanović

=== Retirements ===
- (Croatia) Ana Konjuh

== WTA doubles main draw entrants ==
=== Seeds ===
Country	Player	Country	Player	Rank^{1}	Seed
JPN	Shuko Aoyama	JPN	Ena Shibahara	26	1
HUN	Tímea Babos	RUS	Vera Zvonareva	45	2
CHN	Xu Yifan	CHN	Zhang Shuai	47	3
SRB	Aleksandra Krunić	SRB	Nina Stojanović	115	4

- ^{1} Rankings as of May 10, 2021.

=== Other entrants ===
The following pairs received wildcards into the doubles main draw:

- (Serbia) Ivana Jorović / (Serbia) Lola Radivojević
- ~~(Serbia) Elena Milovanović / (Serbia) Dejana Radanović~~

The following pair received entry into the doubles main draw using a protected ranking:

- (Russia) Natela Dzalamidze / (Russia) Irina Khromacheva

The following pair received entry as alternates:

- (Colombia) Camila Osorio / (United Kingdom) Emily Webley-Smith

=== Withdrawals ===
Before the tournament

- (Spain) Aliona Bolsova / (India) Ankita Raina → replaced by (Romania) Mihaela Buzărnescu / (India) Ankita Raina
- (Russia) Irina Khromacheva / (Montenegro) Danka Kovinić → replaced by (Russia) Natela Dzalamidze / (Russia) Irina Khromacheva
- (Serbia) Elena Milovanović / (Serbia) Dejana Radanović → replaced by (Colombia) Camila Osorio / (United Kingdom) Emily Webley-Smith
- (Russia) Anastasia Potapova / (Russia) Vera Zvonareva → replaced by (Hungary) Tímea Babos / (Russia) Vera Zvonareva
