= Serbia Open =

Coordinates: 44°49′46″N 20°27′05″E

Defunct tennis tournament
- Founded: 2009
- Abolished: 2022
- Editions: 6
- Location: Belgrade; Serbia
- Venue: Novak Tennis Center (formerly: SRPC Milan Gale Muškatirović)
- Category: ATP 250 (2009–2012, 2021–2022); WTA 250 (2021)
- Surface: Hard Court / Indoors
- Draw: 28S / 32Q / 16D (2009–2012); 28S / 16Q / 16D (2021–2022); 32S / 24Q / 16D (WTA)
- Prize money: €534,555 (2022)
- Website: Serbia Open

Current champions (2022)
- Men's singles: Andrey Rublev
- Men's doubles: (Uruguay) Ariel Behar (Ecuador) Gonzalo Escobar

The Serbia Open (Serbian: Отворено првенство Србије / Otvoreno prvenstvo Srbije, or Србија опен / Srbija open) was a professional tennis tournament, part of the ATP 250 series and the ATP Tour. Played on outdoor clay courts, the event was held for the first time in 2009 in Belgrade, Serbia. It was the first for Serbia, as the country had never before hosted an Association of Tennis Professionals tournament. The tournament was held as a combined men's and women's event in 2021. This marked the first time in history a WTA tournament was held in Serbia. The last edition was played in 2022, after which the tournament moved for a one-year period to Banja Luka, Republika Srpska, Bosnia and Herzegovina and rebranded as Srpska Open.

== History ==
The tournament was owned and run by the family of Serbian tennis player Novak Djokovic, who through their company Family Sport purchased the ATP Tour date from the organizers of the Dutch Open in 2008, then arranged with the local city of Belgrade authorities for the plot of land where the venue was built, and convinced the government of Serbia under prime minister Mirko Cvetković to support the event through state-owned enterprises, primarily Telekom Srbija. At the time of their purchase in 2008, Djokovic was the World No. 3 player, having won his first Grand Slam title earlier that year.

Djokovic's uncle Goran Djokovic was the tournament director from its inception, until he resigned the post in late May 2012, a month after the tournament's 2012 edition. Novak Djokovic won the tournament twice, in 2009 and 2011. In 2013, Serbia Open was replaced on the ATP schedule by the newly established Power Horse Cup in Düsseldorf.

The tournament returned to the calendar in April 2021, replacing the Hungarian Open with its now new director, Djordje Djokovic.

The 2023 edition was replaced by the 2023 Srpska Open for one year as Djokovic' family was preparing the Serbian venue in order to apply for an ATP 500 status. In March, 2023, Djokovic revealed that he wanted to buy the licence of owner Ion Tiriac but that Tiriac does not want to sell it, as to lease the licence is very profitable, and too expensive for the Serbia Open. Since it was unlikely that the tournament will be held in 2024, as Djokovic was looking to lease or buy another licence, instead a separate ATP 250 event called the Belgrade Open was held in November that year, as the replacement for the Gijon Open.

== Past finals ==
=== Men's singles ===
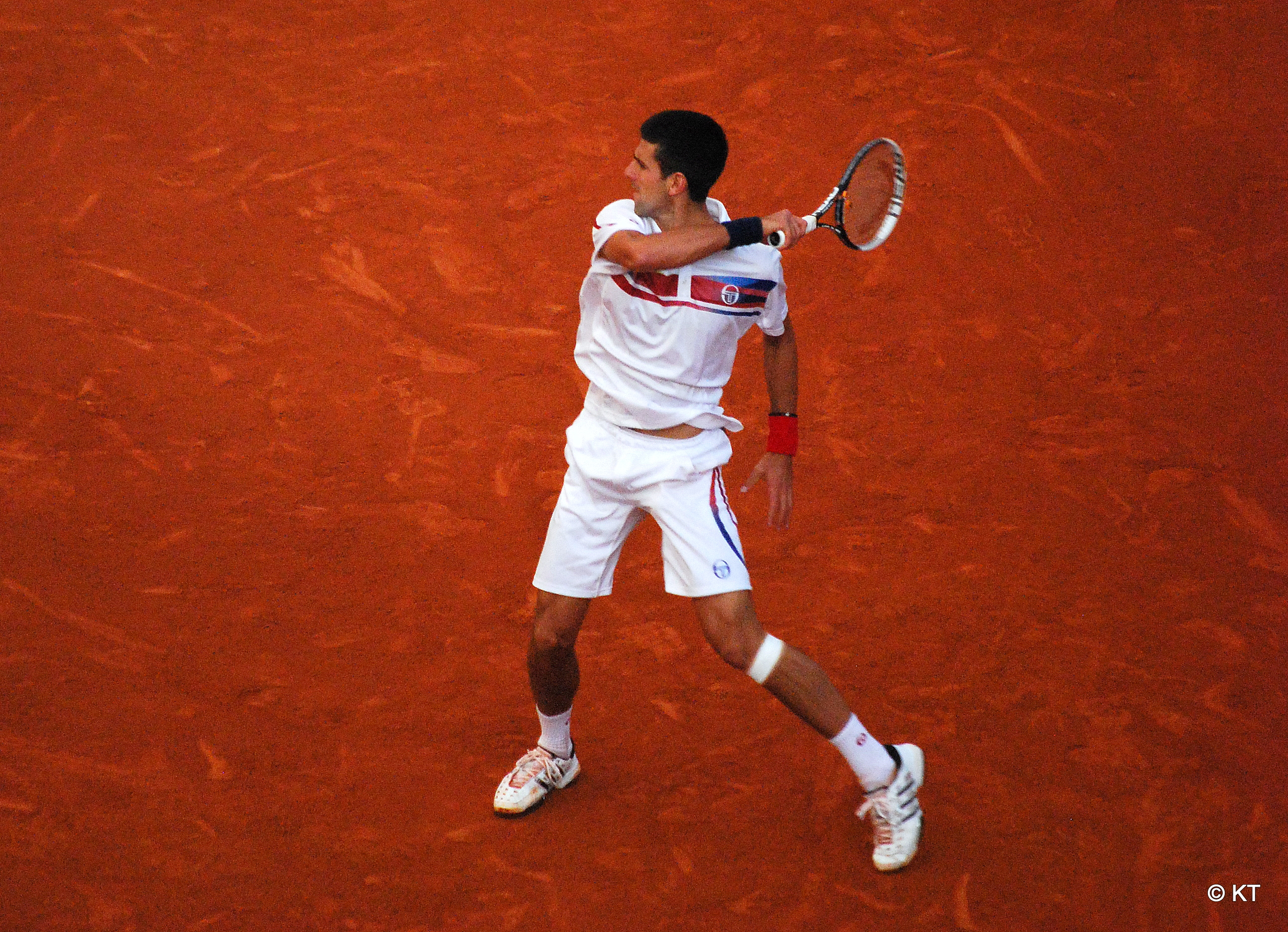
Novak Djokovic, a record two-time winner of the tournament

Year	Champions	Runners-up	Score
2009	(Serbia) Novak Djokovic	(Poland) Łukasz Kubot	6–3, 7–6^{(7–0)}
2010	(United States) Sam Querrey	(United States) John Isner	3–6, 7–6^{(7–4)}, 6–4
2011	(Serbia) Novak Djokovic (2)	(Spain) Feliciano López	7–6^{(7–4)}, 6–2
2012	(Italy) Andreas Seppi	(France) Benoît Paire	6–3, 6–2
2013–2020	Not held		
2021	(Italy) Matteo Berrettini	(Russia) Aslan Karatsev	6–1, 3–6, 7–6^{(7–0)}
2022	Andrey Rublev	(Serbia) Novak Djokovic	6–2, 6–7^{(4–7)},6–0

=== Women's singles ===
Year	Champions	Runners-up	Score
2021	(Spain) Paula Badosa	(Croatia) Ana Konjuh	6–2, 2–0, ret.

=== Men's doubles ===
Year	Champions	Runners-up	Score
2009	(Poland) Łukasz Kubot (Austria) Oliver Marach	(Sweden) Johan Brunström (Netherlands Antilles) Jean-Julien Rojer	6–2, 7–6^{(7–3)}
2010	(Mexico) Santiago González (United States) Travis Rettenmaier	(Poland) Tomasz Bednarek (Poland) Mateusz Kowalczyk	7–6^{(8–6)}, 6–1
2011	(Czech Republic) František Čermák (Slovakia) Filip Polášek	(Austria) Oliver Marach (Austria) Alexander Peya	7–5, 6–2
2012	(Israel) Jonathan Erlich (Israel) Andy Ram	(Germany) Martin Emmrich (Sweden) Andreas Siljeström	4–6, 6–2, [10–6]
2013–2020	Not held		
2021	(Croatia) Ivan Sabanov (Croatia) Matej Sabanov	(Uruguay) Ariel Behar (Ecuador) Gonzalo Escobar	6–3, 7–6^{(7–5)}
2022	(Uruguay) Ariel Behar (Ecuador) Gonzalo Escobar	(Croatia) Nikola Mektić (Croatia) Mate Pavić	6–2, 3–6, [10–7]

=== Women's doubles ===
Year	Champions	Runners-up	Score
2021	(Serbia) Aleksandra Krunić (Serbia) Nina Stojanović	(Belgium) Greet Minnen (Belgium) Alison Van Uytvanck	6–0, 6–2

== See also ==
- List of tennis tournaments
