= Marko Djokovic =

Serbian professional tennis player

- Country (sports): Serbia
- Residence: Belgrade, Serbia
- Born: 20 August 1991 (age 34) Belgrade, SR Serbia, SFR Yugoslavia (modern Serbia)
- Height: 1.87 m (6 ft 1 1/2 in)
- Turned pro: 2007
- Retired: 2019 (last match)
- Plays: Right-handed (two-handed backhand)
- Prize money: US$ 89,765

Singles
- Career record: 0–4
- Career titles: 0
- Highest ranking: No. 571 (14 January 2019)

Grand Slam singles results
- Australian Open Junior: 1R (2008)

Doubles
- Career record: 3–10
- Career titles: 0
- Highest ranking: No. 323 (18 March 2019)
- Last updated on: 29 August 2022.

Marko Djokovic (Serbian Cyrillic: Марко Ђоковић, romanized: Marko Đoković, pronounced [mâːrkɔ d͡ʑɔ̂ːkɔʋit͡ɕ]; born 20 August 1991) is a Serbian former tennis player. He is the middle of the three children of Dijana and Srđan Đoković, younger brother of Novak and elder to Djordje Djokovic. Djokovic was included as a fifth player in a Serbian Davis Cup team for a quarterfinal tie against Croatia in the 2010 Davis Cup.

== Tennis career ==
Djokovic appeared on the junior ITF circuit in September 2006. In July 2007, he failed to qualify for the Croatia Open Umag, losing to Pablo Andújar 6–2, 6–1 in the 1st round of qualifying. He also played, with his elder brother Novak, one doubles match in his career, having been beaten by Édouard Roger-Vasselin and Mathieu Montcourt 7–5, 6–1. Djokovic also has lost in two Futures tournaments in Novi Sad in the first round, both times to compatriot Saša Stojisavljević. He contested the Australian Open juniors in 2008, losing in the first round to Clifford Marsland in 3 sets. Djokovic won his first junior title at the Montenegro Open in Podgorica, defeating Ljubomir Čelebić in the final. In July 2008, Djokovic received a wildcard entry into the qualifying rounds of the Croatia Open Umag but was beaten by Italian Francesco Piccari. In September 2008, in his first ever main ATP Tour event, he received a wildcard entry into the main draw of the Thailand Open. He was defeated in the first round by Jarkko Nieminen 6–2, 6–0. On 7 May 2009, Djokovic, with Darko Mađarovski (as a wildcard pair), defeated ATP doubles world number 2 duo Daniel Nestor and Nenad Zimonjić, by 7–6, 2–6, [10–6], in the opening round of the Serbia Open, an ATP World Tour 250 tournament. This was Marko's first ever ATP win. He was included as a fifth player in the Serbian Davis Cup team for their quarterfinal tie against Croatia in the 2010 Davis Cup – a standard practice of Tennis Federation of Serbia and Davis Cup captain Bogdan Obradović for each tie to invite a different talented young player to practice with regular players and gain necessary experience. Djokovic was given a wildcard for the 2012 Dubai Duty Free tournament and opened the ATP World Tour 500 event against Andrei Golubev of Kazakhstan, losing in straight sets. According to his elder brother Novak, he had stopped playing tennis in 2015, but Marko has since played again in qualifying competitions on the ATP Challenger Tour since 2017, successfully surpassing this phase in the 2018 Copa Sevilla. The change in the ATP ranking points to start the 2019 season propelled Djokovic to a career-high ranking of world No. 574.

== Career statistics ==
=== Challengers and Futures finals ===
==== Singles 2 (1–1) ====
Legend
Challengers (0–0)
Futures (1–1)

Outcome	#	Date	Tournament	Surface	Opponent	Score
Runner-up	1.	15 August 2010	Novi Sad, Serbia F5	Clay	(Bosnia and Herzegovina) Aldin Šetkić	1–6, 1–6
Winner	1.	15 July 2012	Belgrade, Serbia F5	Clay	(Spain) Carlos Gómez-Herrera	4–1 ret.

==== Doubles 6 (5–1) ====
Legend
Challengers (0–0)
Futures (5–1)

Outcome	#	Date	Tournament	Surface	Partner	Opponents	Score
Winner	1.	14 July 2012	Belgrade, Serbia F5	Clay	(United Kingdom) Matthew Short	(Serbia) Bojan Zdravković (North Macedonia) Stefan Micov	7–6^{(7–4)}, 7–5
Winner	2.	18 August 2012	Novi Sad, Serbia F9	Clay	(Spain) Carlos Gómez-Herrera	(Croatia) Mate Čutura (Bosnia and Herzegovina) Franjo Raspudić	6–4, 6–3
Winner	3.	13 July 2013	Belgrade, Serbia F4	Clay	(United Kingdom) Matthew Short	(Serbia) Ivan Bjelica (Croatia) Matej Sabanov	6–4, 6–4
Winner	4.	9 November 2013	Heraklion, Greece F18	Hard	(Spain) Carlos Gómez-Herrera	(United Kingdom) Luke Bambridge (United Kingdom) Oliver Golding	6–1, 6–7^{(3–6)}, [13–11]
Runner-up	1.	21 June 2014	Belgrade, Serbia F2	Clay	(Montenegro) Ljubomir Čelebić	(Australia) Jake Eames (Australia) Gavin Van Peperzeel	2–6, 0–6
Winner	5.	11 November 2017	Heraklion, Greece F8	Hard	(Spain) Carlos Gómez-Herrera	(United States) Conor Berg (United States) Mousheg Hovhannisyan	6–1, 6–2
