= 2009 Serbia Open – Doubles =

Doubles
- 2009 Serbia Open

Final
- Champions: (Poland) Łukasz Kubot (Austria) Oliver Marach
- Runners-up: (Sweden) Johan Brunström (Netherlands Antilles) Jean-Julien Rojer
- Score: 6–2, 7–6(3)

Events
Singles	Doubles
← 2008 ·	Serbia Open	· 2010 →

Łukasz Kubot and Oliver Marach won the final 6–2, 7–6(3) in the final against Johan Brunström and Jean-Julien Rojer.

== Seeds ==
1. (Canada) Daniel Nestor / (Serbia) Nenad Zimonjić (first round)
2. (Poland) Łukasz Kubot / (Austria) Oliver Marach (champions)
3. (Australia) Stephen Huss / (United Kingdom) Ross Hutchins (quarterfinals)
4. (Sweden) Simon Aspelin / (Australia) Paul Hanley (quarterfinals)

== Draw ==
=== Key ===
- Q = Qualifier
- WC = Wild card
- LL = Lucky loser
- Alt = Alternate
- SE = Special exempt
- PR = Protected ranking
- ITF = ITF entry
- JE = Junior exempt
- w/o = Walkover
- r = Retired
- d = Defaulted
- SR = Special ranking

=== Draw ===
First round
1	(Canada) D Nestor (Serbia) N Zimonjić	6^{2}	6	[6]
WC	(Serbia) M Djokovic (Serbia) D Mađarovski	7	2	[10]
(Sweden) J Brunström (Netherlands Antilles) J-J Rojer	6	6
(Belgium) C Rochus (Croatia) L Zovko	2	3
3	(Australia) S Huss (United Kingdom) R Hutchins	7	6
(Czech Republic) J Levinský (Switzerland) J-C Scherrer	6^{6}	4
(Spain) M Granollers (Spain) S Ventura	6	6
(United States) S Querrey (Argentina) S Roitman	4	2
(Netherlands) R Wassen (Slovakia) I Zelenay	7	4	[10]
(Croatia) R Karanušić (Croatia) I Karlović	6^{4}	6	[7]
(France) A Clément (France) N Devilder	3	5
4	(Sweden) S Aspelin (Australia) P Hanley	6	7
(Romania) A Pavel (Romania) H Tecău	4	6	[7]
WC	(Serbia) N Ćirić (Serbia) D Savić	6	3	[10]
(Serbia) J Tipsarević (Serbia) V Troicki	4	1
2	(Poland) Ł Kubot (Austria) O Marach	6	6

Quarterfinals
WC	(Serbia) M Djokovic (Serbia) D Mađarovski	2	2
(Sweden) J Brunström (Netherlands Antilles) J-J Rojer	6	6
3	(Australia) S Huss (United Kingdom) R Hutchins	6^{4}	6	[7]
(Spain) M Granollers (Spain) S Ventura	7	1	[10]
(Netherlands) R Wassen (Slovakia) I Zelenay	6	6
4	(Sweden) S Aspelin (Australia) P Hanley	4	4
WC	(Serbia) N Ćirić (Serbia) D Savić	4	6	[8]
2	(Poland) Ł Kubot (Austria) O Marach	6	3	[10]

Semifinals
(Sweden) J Brunström (Netherlands Antilles) J-J Rojer	6	4	[11]
(Spain) M Granollers (Spain) S Ventura	2	6	[9]
(Netherlands) R Wassen (Slovakia) I Zelenay	5	2
2	(Poland) Ł Kubot (Austria) O Marach	7	6

Final
(Sweden) J Brunström (Netherlands Antilles) J-J Rojer	2	6^{3}
2	(Poland) Ł Kubot (Austria) O Marach	6	7
