= Zlatanović =

Zlatanović (Serbian Cyrillic: Златановић, pronounced [zlatǎːnoʋitɕ]) is a Serbian surname. Notable people with the surname include:

- Arsenije Zlatanović (born 1989), Serbian tennis player
- Igor Zlatanović (born 1998), Serbian footballer
