= 2009 Serbia Open – Singles =

Singles
- 2009 Serbia Open

Final
- Champion: (Serbia) Novak Djokovic
- Runner-up: (Poland) Łukasz Kubot
- Score: 6–3, 7–6^{(7–0)}

Events
Singles	Doubles
Serbia Open	· 2010 →

Novak Djokovic defeated Łukasz Kubot in the final, 6–3, 7–6^{(7–0)} to win the inaugural singles tennis title at the 2009 Serbia Open.

== Seeds ==
The top four seeds receive a bye into the second round.

1. (Serbia) Novak Djokovic (champion)
2. (Croatia) Ivo Karlović (semifinals)
3. (Russia) Igor Andreev (second round)
4. (Italy) Andreas Seppi (semifinals)
5. (Serbia) Viktor Troicki (quarterfinals)
6. (Croatia) Ivan Ljubičić (second round)
7. (France) Arnaud Clément (second round)
8. (Belgium) Christophe Rochus (second round)

== Draw ==
=== Key ===
- Q = Qualifier
- WC = Wild card
- LL = Lucky loser
- Alt = Alternate
- SE = Special exempt
- PR = Protected ranking
- ITF = ITF entry
- JE = Junior exempt
- w/o = Walkover
- r = Retired
- d = Defaulted
- SR = Special ranking

=== Finals ===
Semifinals
1	(Serbia) Novak Djokovic	4	6	6
4	(Italy) Andreas Seppi	6	1	2
LL	(Poland) Łukasz Kubot	7	6
2	(Croatia) Ivo Karlović	6^{0}	2

Final
1	(Serbia) Novak Djokovic	6	7
LL	(Poland) Łukasz Kubot	3	6^{0}

=== Top half ===
First round
(Serbia) J Tipsarević	7	6
(Argentina) S Roitman	5	2
WC	(Serbia) F Krajinović	0	6	2
(Spain) M Granollers	6	2	6
(United States) S Querrey	6	4	3
5	(Serbia) V Troicki	4	6	6
(United States) W Odesnik	3	2
(Argentina) L Mayer	6	6
(Brazil) M Daniel	3	6	6
(Argentina) G Cañas	6	1	4
Q	(Romania) V Crivoi	6^{2}	6	4
6	(Croatia) I Ljubičić	7	3	6

Second round
1	(Serbia) N Djokovic	6	4	6
(Serbia) J Tipsarević	2	6	0
(Spain) M Granollers	3	4
5	(Serbia) V Troicki	6	6
4	(Italy) A Seppi	6	6
(Argentina) L Mayer	4	1
(Brazil) M Daniel	6	6
6	(Croatia) I Ljubičić	4	3

Quarterfinals
1	(Serbia) N Djokovic	6	6
5	(Serbia) V Troicki	3	2
4	(Italy) A Seppi	6	7
(Brazil) M Daniel	4	5

Semifinals
1	(Serbia) N Djokovic	4	6	6
4	(Italy) A Seppi	6	1	2

=== Bottom half ===
First round
8	(Belgium) C Rochus	6	6^{7}	7
(France) N Devilder	3	7	5
(Belgium) K Vliegen	2	6	6
Q	(Slovakia) D Hrbatý	6	2	2
LL	(Poland) Ł Kubot	6	7
WC	(Serbia) A Zlatanović	3	5
7	(France) A Clément	6	6
Q	(Spain) S Ventura	1	4
Q	(Italy) F Cipolla	1	6	6
WC	(Cyprus) M Baghdatis	6	3	1
(Argentina) B Dabul	6	6
(Chile) N Massú	2	1

Second round
8	(Belgium) C Rochus	6	4	3
(Belgium) K Vliegen	3	6	6
LL	(Poland) Ł Kubot	3
3	(Russia) I Andreev	2	r
7	(France) A Clément	6	4	2
Q	(Italy) F Cipolla	1	6	6
(Argentina) B Dabul	4	6^{5}
2	(Croatia) I Karlović	6	7

Quarterfinals
(Belgium) K Vliegen	6^{6}	3
LL	(Poland) Ł Kubot	7	6
Q	(Italy) F Cipolla	3	3
2	(Croatia) I Karlović	6	6

Semifinals
LL	(Poland) Ł Kubot	7	6
2	(Croatia) I Karlović	6^{0}	2
