= Darko Mađarovski =

Serbian tennis player (born 1983)

- ITF name: Darko Madjarovski
- Country (sports): Serbia and Montenegro; Serbia
- Born: 17 June 1983 (age 43) Belgrade, Yugoslavia
- Turned pro: 2001
- Retired: 2009
- Plays: Right-handed (two-handed backhand)
- Prize money: US $71,526

Singles
- Career record: 0–0
- Career titles: 0; 5 Futures
- Highest ranking: No. 332 (27 Oct 2003)

Doubles
- Career record: 1–1
- Career titles: 0; 9 Futures
- Highest ranking: No. 331 (15 Sep 2003)

Team competitions
- Davis Cup: 0–1 (Sin. 0–0, Dbs. 0–1)
Medal record
Summer Universiade
Silver medal – second place	2005 İzmir	Men's Doubles

Darko Mađarovski (Serbian Cyrillic: Дарко Мађаровски; born 17 June 1983) is a Serbian tennis coach and a former professional player.

== Junior career ==
Born in Belgrade, Mađarovski reached a career-high ranking of No. 3 in doubles on the ITF Junior Circuit. He won the Osaka Mayor's Cup and was the runner-up in the Orange Bowl, both alongside his regular junior partner, Janko Tipsarević.

== Professional career ==
Mađarovski achieved a career-high singles ranking of No. 332 on the professional tour and won five ITF Futures titles, including one in which he defeated Juan Martín del Potro in the final. In 2002, he made a Davis Cup appearance for FR Yugoslavia, competing in the doubles against South Africa, partnering Dušan Vemić. He won a silver medal in doubles at the 2005 Universiade and finished as a doubles finalist in three ATP Challenger tournaments. His only ATP Tour main draw appearance came at the 2009 Serbia Open, where he and Marko Djokovic upset the top-seeded pair of Daniel Nestor and Nenad Zimonjić in the first round.

== See also ==
- List of Serbia Davis Cup team representatives
