= 2011 BNP Paribas Masters – Singles qualifying =

This article displays the qualifying draw of the 2011 BNP Paribas Masters.

== Players ==
=== Seeds ===
1. (Australia) Bernard Tomic (first round)
2. (United States) Donald Young (qualified)
3. (Colombia) Santiago Giraldo (qualified)
4. (Germany) Philipp Kohlschreiber (qualified)
5. (Italy) Andreas Seppi (qualified)
6. (Ukraine) Sergiy Stakhovsky (qualified)
7. (Russia) Igor Kunitsyn (qualifying competition, Lucky loser)
8. (Poland) Łukasz Kubot (qualifying competition)
9. (Finland) Jarkko Nieminen (qualifying competition)
10. (Spain) Albert Ramos (first round)
11. (Uzbekistan) Denis Istomin (first round)
12. (Czech Republic) Lukáš Rosol (first round)

=== Qualifiers ===
1. (France) Nicolas Mahut
2. (United States) Donald Young
3. (Colombia) Santiago Giraldo
4. (Germany) Philipp Kohlschreiber
5. (Italy) Andreas Seppi
6. (Ukraine) Sergiy Stakhovsky

=== Lucky loser ===
1. (Russia) Igor Kunitsyn

== Qualifying draw ==
=== First qualifier ===
First round
1	(Australia) Bernard Tomic	6^{4}	2
(France) Nicolas Mahut	7^{7}	6
WC	(France) Florent Serra	2	3
8	(Poland) Łukasz Kubot	6	6

Qualifying competition
(France) Nicolas Mahut	6	6
8	(Poland) Łukasz Kubot	1	4

=== Second qualifier ===
First round
2	(United States) Donald Young	6	7^{9}
Alt	(France) Maxime Teixeira	4	6^{7}
(Australia) Matthew Ebden	5	3
9	(Finland) Jarkko Nieminen	7	6

Qualifying competition
2	(United States) Donald Young	6	6
9	(Finland) Jarkko Nieminen	4	2

=== Third qualifier ===
First round
3	(Colombia) Santiago Giraldo	7^{7}	7^{7}
(Russia) Teymuraz Gabashvili	6^{3}	6^{2}
(France) Benoît Paire	6	3	6
11	(Uzbekistan) Denis Istomin	4	6	1

Qualifying competition
3	(Colombia) Santiago Giraldo	6	6^{5}	6
(France) Benoît Paire	2	7^{7}	4

=== Fourth qualifier ===
First round
4	(Germany) Philipp Kohlschreiber	6	6
(Turkey) Marsel İlhan	3	2
WC	(France) Arnaud Clément	7^{7}	5	6
12	(Czech Republic) Lukáš Rosol	6^{4}	7	0

Qualifying competition
4	(Germany) Philipp Kohlschreiber	7	1	6
WC	(France) Arnaud Clément	5	6	1

=== Fifth qualifier ===
First round
5	(Italy) Andreas Seppi	6	7
WC	(France) Marc Gicquel	4	5
(United States) Sam Querrey	6	6
10	(Spain) Albert Ramos	3	3

Qualifying competition
5	(Italy) Andreas Seppi	6^{2}	6	6
(United States) Sam Querrey	7^{7}	1	1

=== Sixth qualifier ===
First round
6	(Ukraine) Sergiy Stakhovsky	6	6^{2}	6
WC	(France) Kenny de Schepper	3	7^{7}	1
(France) Édouard Roger-Vasselin	6	4	3
7	(Russia) Igor Kunitsyn	2	6	6

Qualifying competition
6	(Ukraine) Sergiy Stakhovsky	7^{7}	6^{3}	6
7	(Russia) Igor Kunitsyn	6^{1}	7^{7}	3
