= Łukasz Kubot =

Polish tennis player (born 1982)

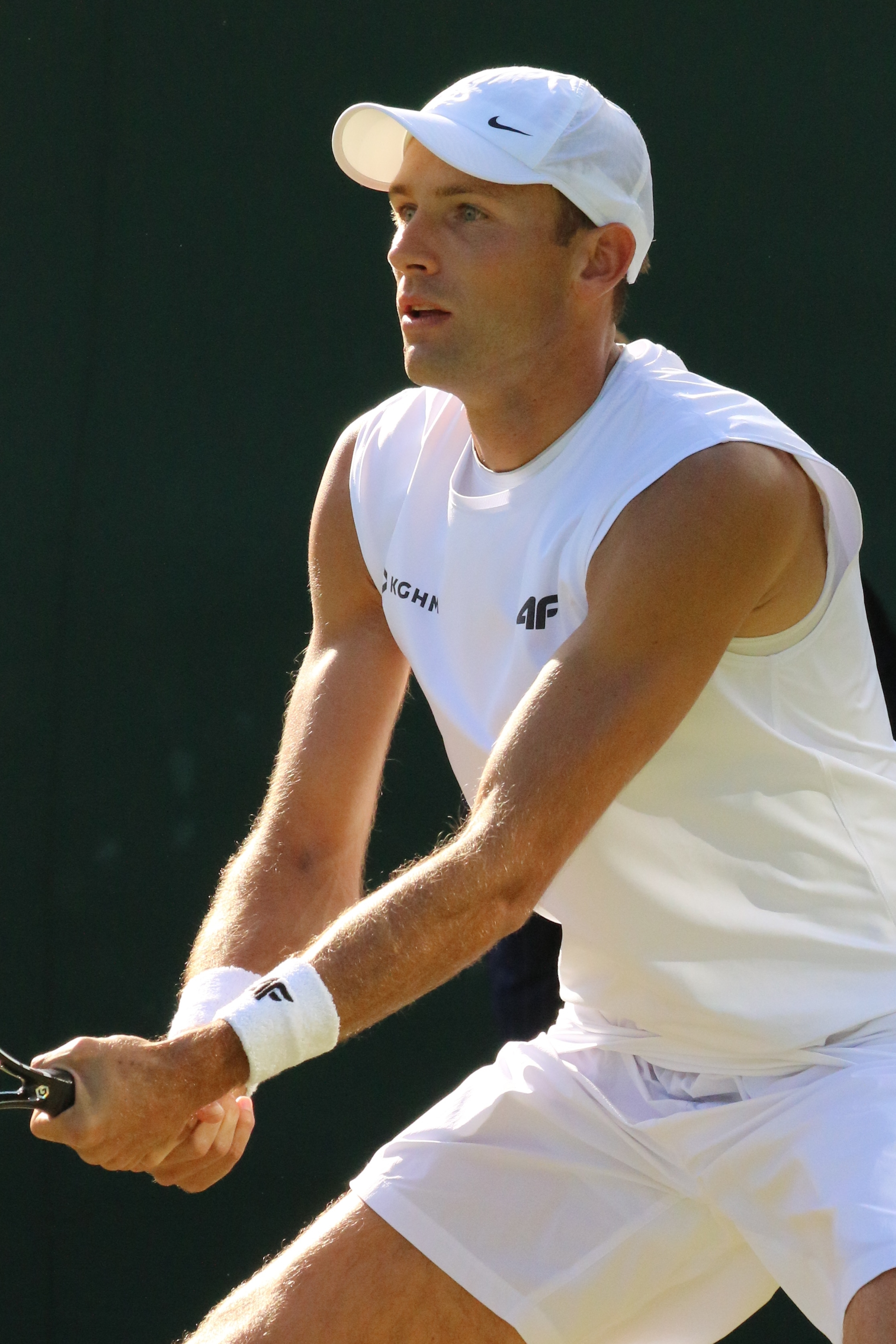
- Country (sports): Poland
- Residence: Lubin, Poland
- Born: 16 May 1982 (age 44) Bolesławiec, Poland
- Height: 1.91 m (6 ft 3 in)
- Turned pro: 2002
- Retired: 2023
- Plays: Right-handed (two-handed backhand)
- Coach: Jan Stočes
- Prize money: US $8,728,383
- Official website: lukasz-kubot.com

Singles
- Career record: 97–130
- Career titles: 0
- Highest ranking: No. 41 (12 April 2010)

Grand Slam singles results
- Australian Open: 4R (2010)
- French Open: 3R (2011, 2012)
- Wimbledon: QF (2013)
- US Open: 3R (2006)

Other tournaments
- Olympic Games: 1R (2012)

Doubles
- Career record: 435–305
- Career titles: 27
- Highest ranking: No. 1 (8 January 2018)

Grand Slam doubles results
- Australian Open: W (2014)
- French Open: SF (2016)
- Wimbledon: W (2017)
- US Open: F (2018)

Other doubles tournaments
- Tour Finals: F (2017)
- Olympic Games: 2R (2016)

Mixed doubles
- Career titles: 0

Grand Slam mixed doubles results
- Australian Open: QF (2020)
- French Open: QF (2009)
- Wimbledon: 3R (2015, 2016)
- US Open: SF (2015)

Other mixed doubles tournaments
- Olympic Games: QF (2020)

Łukasz Kubot (Polish pronunciation: [ˈwukaʂ ˈkubɔt]; born 16 May 1982) is a former Polish professional tennis player who was ranked world No. 1 in doubles.

He is a two-time Grand Slam champion in doubles, having won the 2014 Australian Open with Robert Lindstedt, as well as the 2017 Wimbledon Championships with Marcelo Melo. Kubot has won 27 doubles titles on the ATP Tour, including four at Masters 1000 level, all alongside Melo. The pair also finished runners-up at the 2018 US Open and 2017 ATP Finals. In January 2018 he became world No. 1 for the first time, the first Polish player ever to do so in singles or doubles.

Kubot has also had success in singles, achieving a career-high ranking of world No. 41 in April 2010 and reaching the quarterfinals of the 2013 Wimbledon Championships. He also reached the final at the 2009 Serbia Open and the 2010 Brasil Open. Kubot has represented Poland in the Davis Cup since 2001, also competing at three editions of the Summer Olympics. In 2013 he was awarded the Gold Cross of Merit by Polish President Bronisław Komorowski.

== Personal life ==
Łukasz Kubot was born in Bolesławiec, Poland. His parents are Dorota and Janusz Kubot, a football player and coach. He has a sister named Paulina Kubot-Wojtasińska. Kubot and his fiancé Magdalena Bieńkowska welcomed their daughter Zofia on September 9, 2020. He speaks five languages: Polish, Czech, German, English, and Russian.

== Career ==
=== 2007–2009: First doubles title ===
In 2007 Kubot's two main-draw wins came in Davis Cup ties. In 2008 Kubot did not play a single main-draw match.

Kubot started 2009 by competing in the qualifying rounds of Qatar ExxonMobil Open and the Australian Open, but he fell in the final round. He then qualified for the Brasil Open, where he recorded his first main-draw win in over one and a half year against Daniel Gimeno Traver, but lost in the following round to Thomaz Bellucci. He then continued to play in qualifying, but failed to qualify. However, in the 2009 Serbia Open, he fell in the final round of the qualifying draw, but was granted a lucky loser spot after Steve Darcis withdrew due a shoulder injury. He defeated Arsenije Zlatanović, Igor Andreev, Kristof Vliegen, and an upset victory over second seed Ivo Karlović. He then lost in straight sets against World No. 3 and top seed Novak Djokovic, in his first final. He became the first Pole to reach an ATP final in 26 years (since Wojciech Fibak in 1983). He also reached the doubles final at the same event partnering Oliver Marach, which he won.

At Roland Garros, he qualified, but lost to Viktor Troicki in the first round, in just around 4 hours. His next main-draw appearance came in MercedesCup in Stuttgart, where he recorded wins over Pablo Andújar and Philipp Kohlschreiber, but lost to Nicolas Kiefer in the quarterfinals. He then qualified in Cincinnati, but lost to José Acasuso, in the first round. In Beijing, he recorded the biggest win of his career by upsetting Andy Roddick in the very first round, but lost to Ivan Ljubičić the following round. He then lost in the first rounds of Shanghai and Vienna. In the 2009 BNP Paribas Masters, he defeated Andreas Beck, but lost to Marin Čilić, after qualifying.

In doubles, he won the 2009 Grand Prix Hassan II, the 2009 Serbia Open, and the 2009 Bank Austria-TennisTrophy, all with his regular doubles partner Oliver Marach. They also reached the semifinals of the 2009 Australian Open, losing to Mahesh Bhupathi and Mark Knowles. They were able to qualify in the 2009 ATP World Tour Finals, falling in the round-robin stage despite winning two matches over the teams of Max Mirnyi and Andy Ram, and Lukáš Dlouhý and Leander Paes, only losing to Bob Bryan and Mike Bryan

=== 2010: Three doubles titles ===
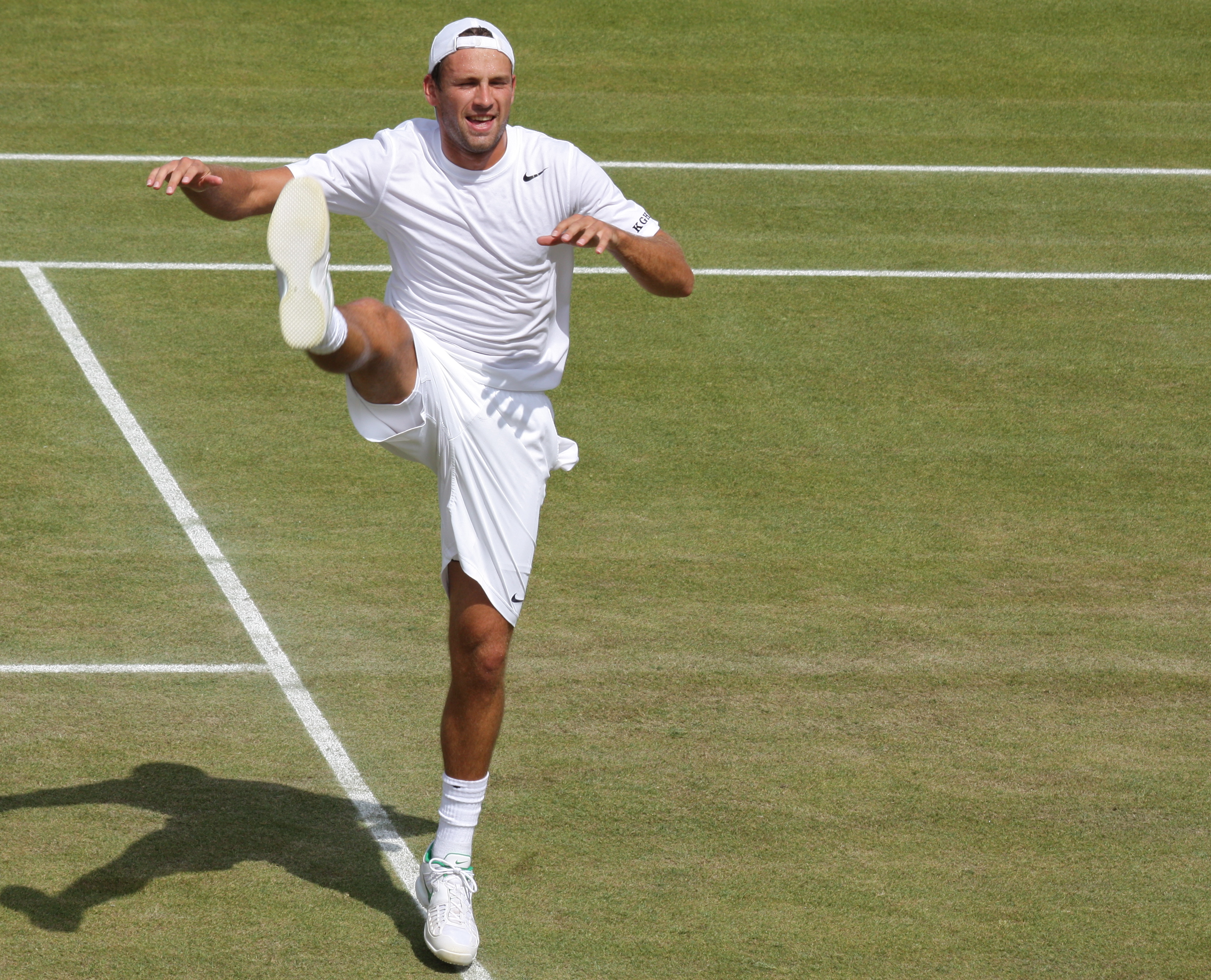
Łukasz Kubot can-can dancing

Kubot started his 2010 campaign in Doha, where he reached the quarterfinals, losing to Viktor Troicki, after recording straight-set wins over Karim Maamoun and Sergiy Stakhovsky. He then played in the Australian Open, where he reached his first fourth round in a Grand Slam tournament. He earned this spot by defeating Mischa Zverev, and Santiago Giraldo, and through the withdrawal of 20th seed Mikhail Youzhny. He was defeated by Novak Djokovic. In the Movistar Open, he lost to Marcel Granollers, after defeating Horacio Zeballos. In the 2010 Brasil Open, he reached the final, his second of his career. He earned that by defeating Óscar Hernández, Albert Montañés, and Fabio Fognini, in straight sets. He came back against fourth seed Igor Andreev in the semifinals. In the final, he lost to top seed Juan Carlos Ferrero, failing to hold serve in the whole match.

He then suffered early losses in his next three tournaments to credible players in the 2010 Copa Telmex, losing to Juan Mónaco, in the 2010 Abierto Mexicano Telcel to Fernando Verdasco, and the 2010 BNP Paribas Open to David Nalbandian. He then regained form, reaching the quarterfinals of the 2010 Grand Prix Hassan II, losing to Potito Starace. However, he lost in the first round of the 2010 Monte-Carlo Rolex Masters to Viktor Troicki.

In doubles, he won the 2010 Movistar Open in Santiago, the Mexican Open (tennis) in Acapulco, and the Romanian Open Trophy in Bucharest.

=== 2011: Fourth round at Wimbledon ===
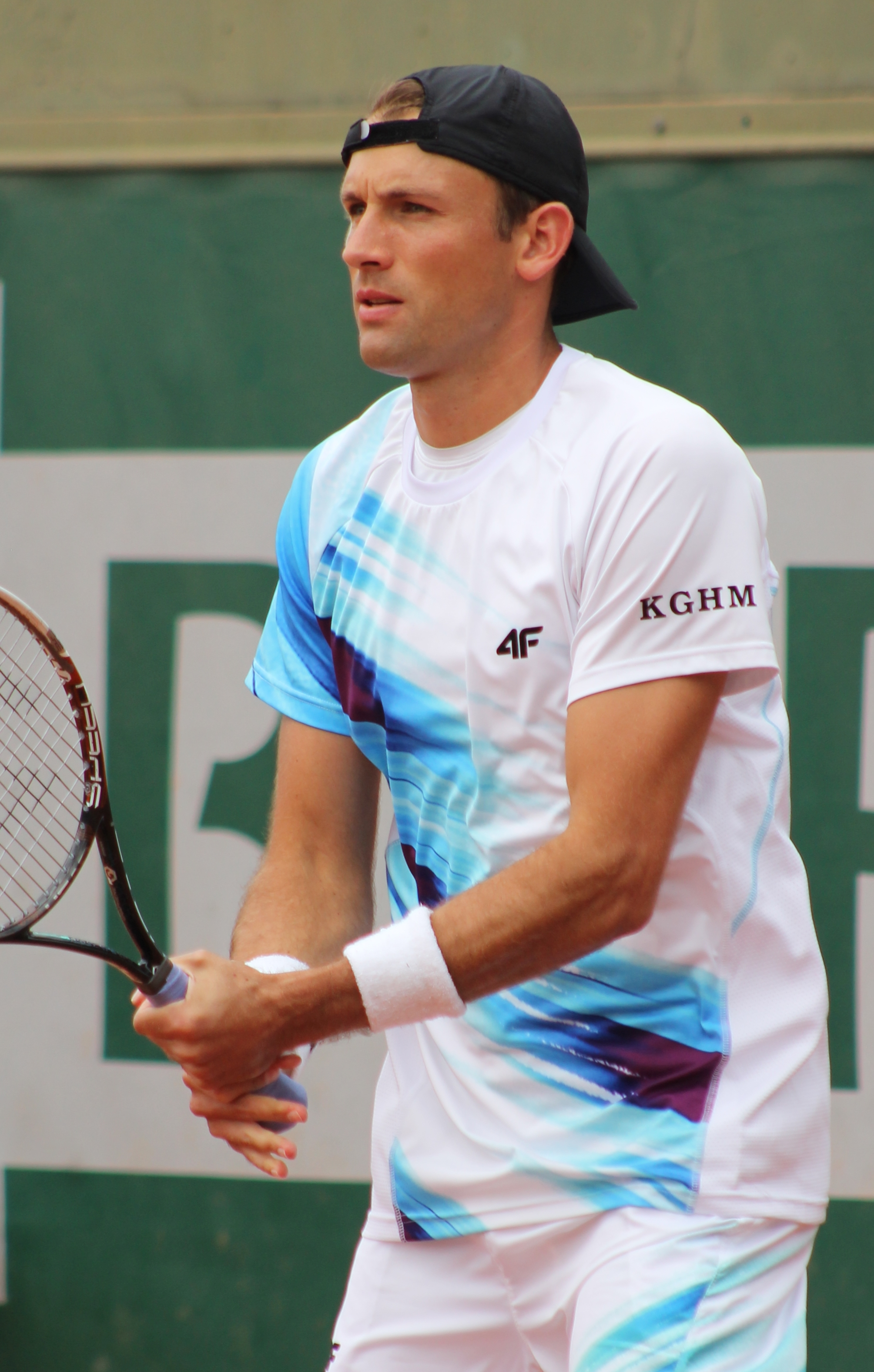
Łukasz Kubot in 2013

At the 2011 French Open, Kubot was down two sets to none in his first-round match against 11th seed Nicolás Almagro. Kubot stormed back and won the match in five sets. He progressed to the third round, before he was ousted. He earned the nickname "Lukasz the Lionhearted" for his aggressive style of play.

He then qualified for the 2011 Wimbledon Championships and advanced to the fourth round, defeating Arnaud Clément in five sets, Ivo Karlović in straight sets, and Gaël Monfils in four sets. In the fourth round, he led Feliciano López by two sets to love and had two match points in the third set tiebreak, but eventually lost in five sets.

=== 2012: Stuttgart Open doubles title ===
Kubot made the quarterfinals in Memphis, before losing to Benjamin Becker. He also reached the quarterfinals in Bucharest, losing to Gilles Simon.

Kubot reached the third round of the French Open, losing to Belgian David Goffin.

Kubot made the quarterfinals in Gstaad, where he lost to Grigor Dimitrov. At Winston-Salem, he made the third round, losing again to Goffin.

In doubles, he made three finals, including the Masters 1000 event in Rome, partnering Janko Tipsarević. He won the tournament in Stuttgart, partnering Jérémy Chardy.

=== 2013: Wimbledon quarterfinal ===
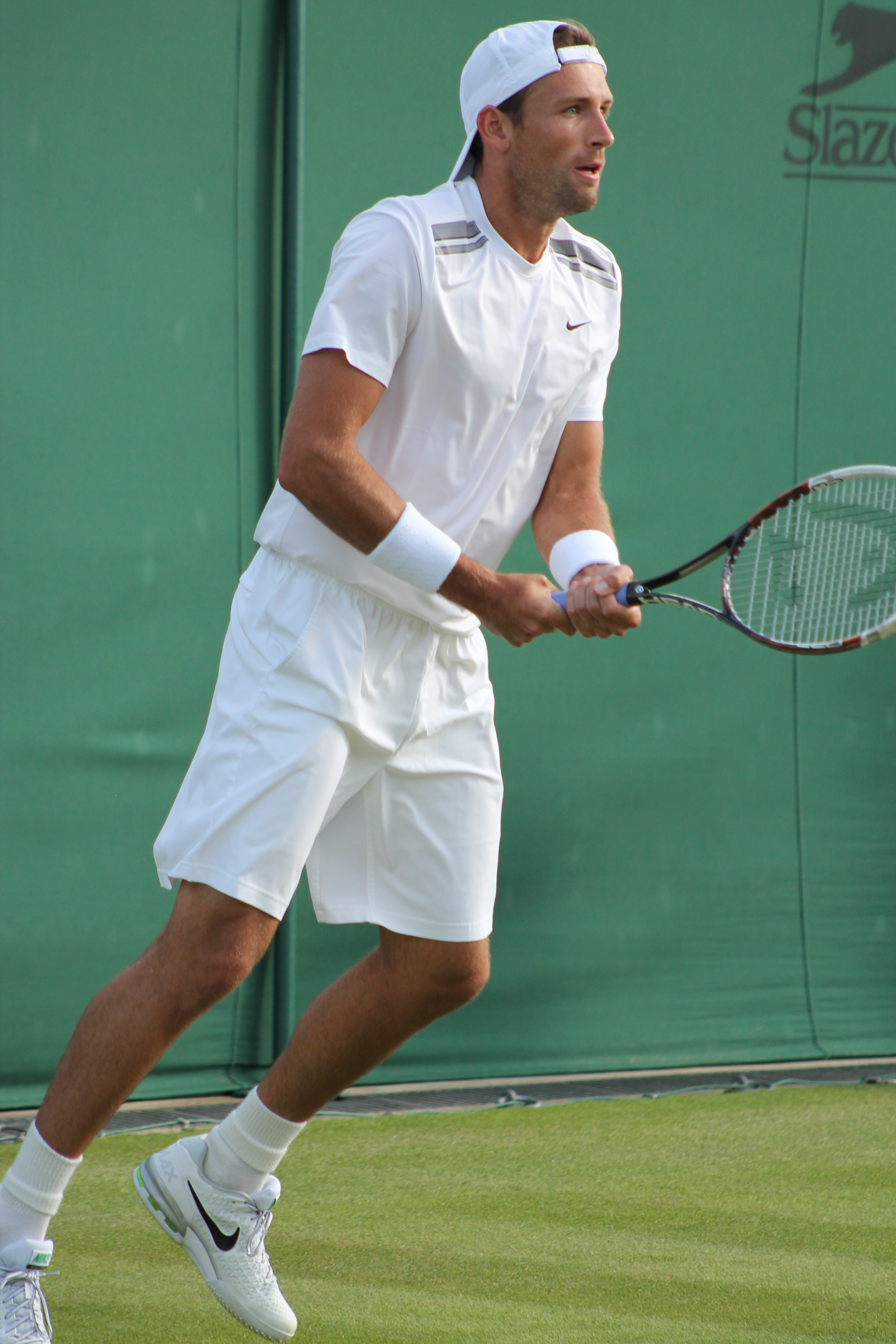
Łukasz Kubot in 2013

Ranked no. 130 in the world, Kubot reached the quarterfinals of 2013 Wimbledon Championships. He defeated Igor Andreev in the first round before getting a walkover after second round opponent (and conqueror of Rafael Nadal in the first round) Steve Darcis withdrew through injury. He then defeated Benoît Paire and Adrian Mannarino before losing in an all-Polish slam quarterfinal against Jerzy Janowicz.

=== 2014: Australian Open doubles title ===
In January Kubot and Sweden's Robert Lindstedt won the Australian Open men's doubles title. The pair had played just two tennis tournaments together, losing in the first round of both, before entering the Australian Open. In the final they defeated American Eric Butorac and South African Raven Klaasen, who had knocked out top seeds Bob Bryan and Mike Bryan. Lindstedt said he had been slated to play with Jürgen Melzer, but the Austrian withdrew with injury before the tournament. "I had to scramble up a partner in December and I'm thankful that Kubot said yes", stated Lindstedt.

=== 2016: Third Vienna Open doubles title and race to Rio ===
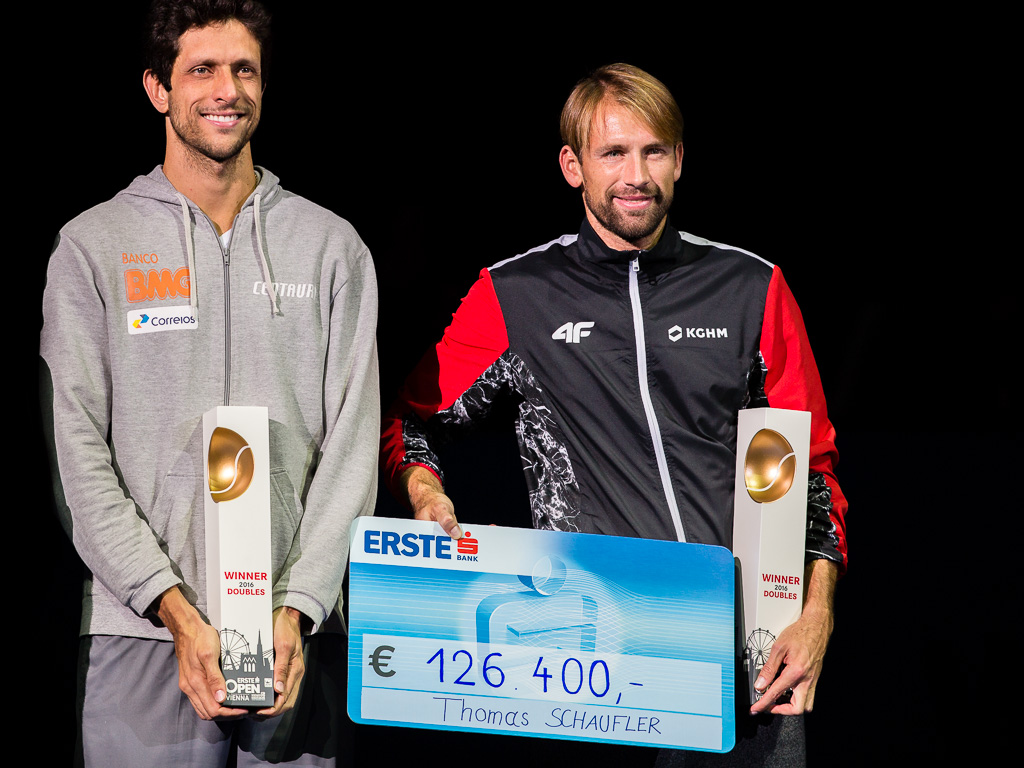
Łukasz Kubot and Marcelo Melo, 2016 Vienna Open Champions

In August Kubot participated in the 2016 Summer Olympics in Rio de Janeiro, Brazil. Partnered with Marcin Matkowski, he defeated Indian tennis pair of Leander Paes and Rohan Bopanna. Subsequently, Kubot and Matkowski lost to the eighth seeded Spanish pair of Roberto Bautista Agut and David Ferrer in the second round. Kubot also participated in the mixed doubles, where he was partnered with the 2015 WTA Finals winner, Agnieszka Radwańska. Radwańska and Kubot lost to the Romanian pair of Irina Camelia Begu and Horia Tecău in the first round.

In October, Kubot partnered with Marcelo Melo defeated Oliver Marach and Fabrice Martin to win the Vienna Open Doubles Title for the third time in his career.

=== 2017: Wimbledon doubles title and year-end No. 1 ATP doubles ranking ===
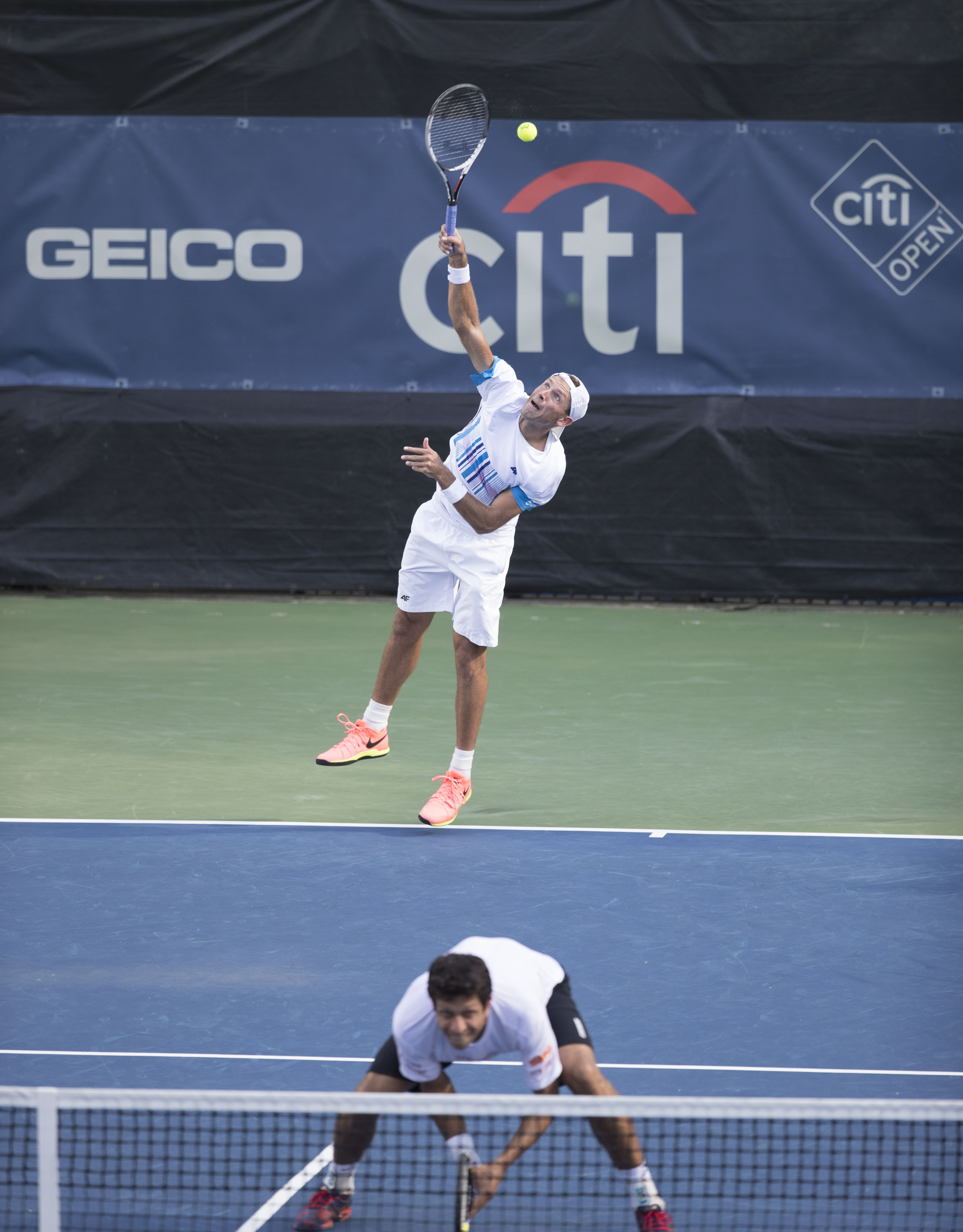
Łukasz Kubot with Marcelo Melo at the Citi Open in 2017

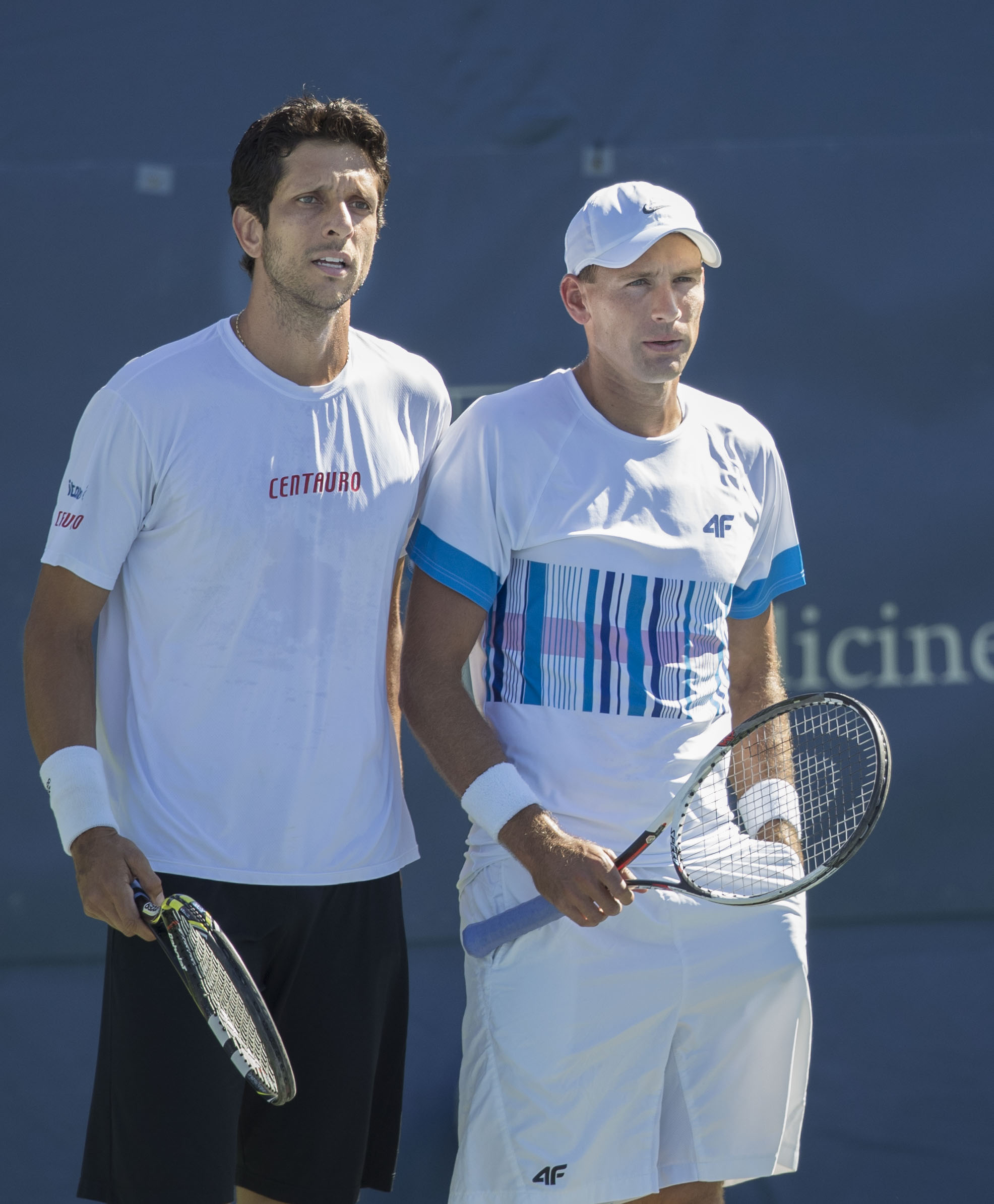
Łukasz Kubot with Marcelo Melo at the Citi Open in 2017

In March Kubot with his doubles partner Marcelo Melo reached the doubles final at Indian Wells Masters. Eighth-seeded Łukasz Kubot and Marcelo Melo reached the BNP Paribas Open semi-finals after breezing past tricky wild card duo, Nick Kyrgios and Nenad Zimonjić. The Polish-Brazilian pair then defeated fourth seeds Jamie Murray and Bruno Soares to reach the final against the 6th seeds, South Africa's Raven Klaasen and his American doubles partner, Rajeev Ram. At the 2017 Miami Open Kubot and Melo dropped only three sets en route to the final to reach their second straight ATP Masters 1000 final. The sixth-seeded Kubot and Melo defeated American duo Nick Monroe and Jack Sock in straight sets. It was their first ever Masters 1000 title won as a team. Kubot and Melo have continued their streak of claiming at least one ATP doubles title together in a season for the third straight year. They are back-to-back Vienna doubles champions, having won the tournament together in 2015 and 2016. Miami Open was their 11th career tournament together, with a current overall 22–8 record and 12–6 record in 2017.

In April, Kubot and Melo reached the quarter-finals at the Monte-Carlo Masters, the season's third Masters 1000 tournament. The following month they reached their third ATP World Tour Masters 1000 final of the season after they defeated seventh seeds Ivan Dodig and Marcel Granollers at the Mutua Madrid Open (tennis). In the Mutua Madrid Open final they defeated French duo consisting of Nicolas Mahut and Édouard Roger-Vasselin to win their second Masters 1000 doubles title this season. Seeded fourth at the French Open Kubot and Melo overcame a first round challenge from Julien Benneteau and Jérémy Chardy to advance to the second round. In the 2nd round they lost to Ryan Harrison and Michael Venus.

Kubot and Melo continued their fine season by taking the doubles title at the Ricoh Open, living up to their top seed status in 's-Hertogenbosch by defeating second seeds Raven Klaasen and Rajeev Ram. As top seeds Kubot and Melo continued their dominance on grass courts by taking the doubles title at the Gerry Weber Open in Halle, outlasting brothers Alexander Zverev and Mischa Zverev. Their victory in Halle also further extended their lead in the Emirates ATP Doubles Race To London. They stayed perfect on the grass courts, ousting top seeds Henri Kontinen and John Peers in the Wimbledon semi-finals. In the Wimbledon final, the fourth seeds defeated 16th seeds Oliver Marach and Mate Pavić. The final lasted a marathon 4 hours 41 minutes and was only the fourth Wimbledon men's doubles final to go to five sets in the last 20 years.

In November Kubot and Melo won the men's doubles title at the Paris Masters tennis tournament. The pair defeated Ivan Dodig and Marcel Granollers in the final. The Polish-Brazilian duo made the final after easing past Jamie Murray and Bruno Soares in the semifinal and Feliciano López and Marc López in the quarterfinals. The Paris victory marks Kubot and Melo's sixth title of the season, after wins at Wimbledon, Miami, Madrid, Halle and s'Hertogenbosch. Following the Paris Masters Kubot officially moved up to world No. 2 in the Association of Tennis Professionals’ (ATP) doubles rankings.

At the Nitto ATP Finals top seeds Kubot and Melo outclassed No. 7 seeds Ivan Dodig and Marcel Granollers to clinch year-end No. 1 ATP doubles ranking. "This year has been amazing for me and Lukas, the first year we're playing together. Finishing as the No. 1 team in the world for me, it means a lot", Melo said, "We achieved this as a team. I'm very proud". They also defeated four-time former season finale champions Bob Bryan and Mike Bryan and subsequently qualified for the semi-finals. In the semifinal they knocked out eighth seed Ryan Harrison and Michael Venus for a place in the title match. In the final Kubot and Melo, who were 49-17 for the season, fell to second seeds and defending champions Henri Kontinen and John Peers.

=== 2018: World No. 1 in doubles, tied with Marcelo Melo ===
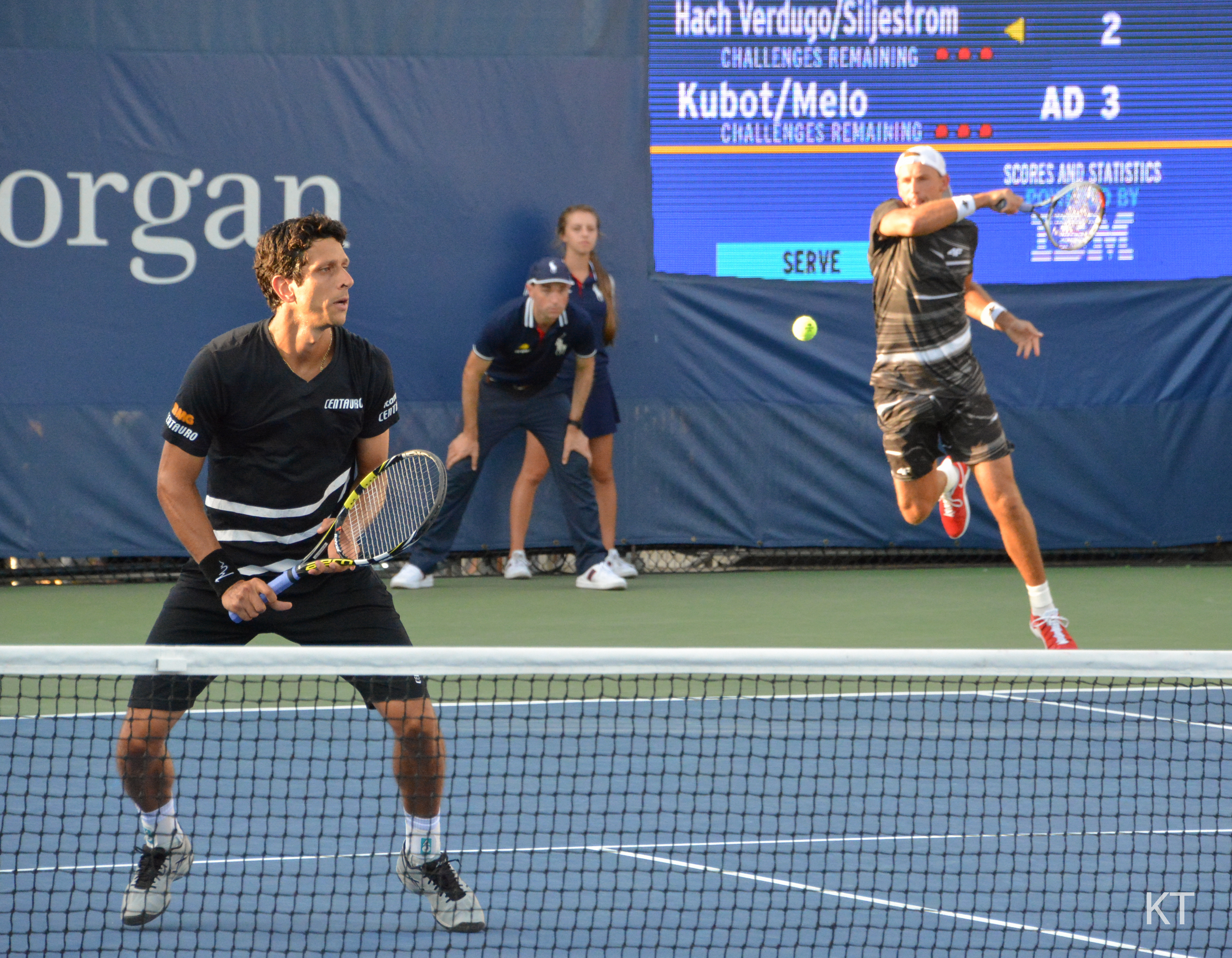
Łukasz Kubot with Marcelo Melo at the US Open in 2018

At the start of the season top-seeds Łukasz Kubot and Marcelo Melo defeated Jan-Lennard Struff and Viktor Troicki to capture the Sydney International men's doubles title.

Following Sydney Kubot attained No. 1 in the ATP Doubles Rankings, and has become the 51st player since 1976 to reach the pinnacle of the sport. "It's great for Poland", said Kubot. "I’m happy that I’m one of the ambassadors for tennis in my country, putting Polish tennis on the map of the world. I’m grateful to Wojtek Fibak, who was No. 2 in doubles (1979) and Top 10 in singles (1977). He gave me a lot of advice from his experience, and motivation".

Top seeds Kubot and Melo advanced to the Australian Open quarter-finals after coming from a set down to beat 16th seeds Rajeev Ram and Divij Sharan. Unbeaten in 2018, they lost to Ben McLachlan and Jan-Lennard Struff in the quarterfinal.

In Halle, Marcelo Melo and Łukasz Kubot—who went undefeated on grass last year—defended their title, beating Alexander and Mischa Zverev in the final. It was Melo and Kubot's first title victory since January in Sydney. At Wimbledon, seeded second, Kubot and Melo lost to Jonathan Erlich and Marcin Matkowski in the second round.

Fifth seeds Kubot and Melo advanced to the quarter-finals of the Western & Southern Open for the second year in a row, beating Rogers Cup finalists Raven Klaasen and Michael Venus. The Polish-Brazilian duo avenged a loss they suffered against the same team one week ago in Toronto. In the quarterfinal Kubot and Melo lost to fourth seeds Jamie Murray and Bruno Soares, who triumphed in Acapulco and Washington, D.C. earlier this season. It was the first Head2Head meeting between the two teams this year.

Seeded seventh at the US Open, Kubot and Melo defeated Divij Sharan and Artem Sitak in the second round. In the third round they overpowered the 2018 French Open champions Nicolas Mahut and Pierre-Hugues Herbert. They continued their great form with a straight set win over Austin Krajicek and Tennys Sandgren to reach their first US Open semifinal. In the semifinal they defeated Malek Jaziri and Radu Albot for a spot in the final of the Men's doubles event at the 2018 US Open. Kubot and Melo came into the tournament having lost five of their previous seven matches and also ended up losing to the third-seeded Americans Mike Bryan and Jack Sock in the final.

No. 2 seeds Kubot and Melo beat top-seeded Oliver Marach and Mate Pavić in the China Open final to claim their third team title of the season. Following China Open they also won the Rolex Shanghai Masters doubles title. In the Shanghai final they defeated sixth-seeded Jamie Murray and Bruno Soares to continue their strong form and win back-to-back titles.

For the second consecutive season Kubot and Melo qualified for the Nitto ATP Finals at The O2 Arena in London. No. 3 seeds Kubot and Melo secured a spot for the prestigious season-ending event after beating second-seeded Oliver Marach and Mate Pavić in the Rolex Shanghai Masters semi-final. Kubot and Melo were eliminated from the ATP Finals despite winning their final match against top-seeds Oliver Marach and Mate Pavić. For the third time in his career Kubot ended the season in the top 10 ATP doubles ranking at No. 9.

=== 2019: Kubot's 25th doubles title and 6th ATP doubles finals appearance ===
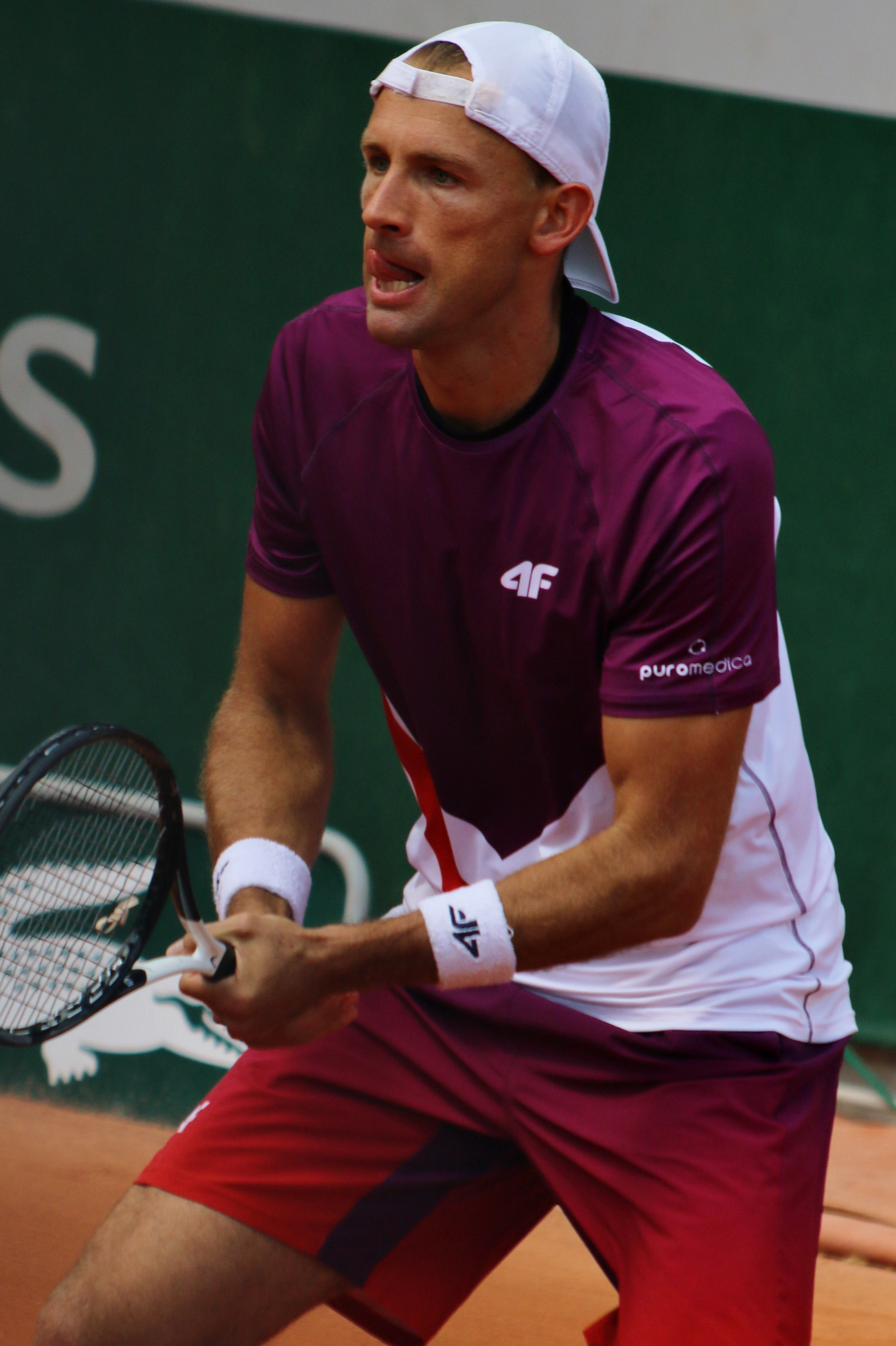
Łukasz Kubot at the 2019 French Open

At the start of the season Kubot's partner Marcelo Melo was sidelined from Australian Open due to suffering a back injury. As a result, Kubot played doubles partnered with Horacio Zeballos. Kubot and Zeballos defeated Aljaž Bedene and Maximilian Marterer in the first round and Fabrice Martin and Jérémy Chardy in the second round. In his fifth career Australian Open doubles quarterfinal Kubot and his partner lost to Ryan Harrison and Sam Querrey in three sets.

At the 2019 BNP Paribas Open sixth seeds Łukasz Kubot and Marcelo Melo rallied past Wesley Koolhof and Stefanos Tsitsipas in first round and defeated Nick Kyrgios and Taylor Fritz to reach the quarterfinal. They battled past Dominic Inglot and Franko Škugor in one hour and 23 minutes and defeated Novak Djokovic and Fabio Fognini for a spot in the final. Runners-up in 2017, Kubot and Melo lost a tight finals match to Nikola Mektić and Horacio Zeballos.

Top seeds Łukasz Kubot and Marcelo Melo broke three times to return to the 2019 Miami Open semi-finals. The 2017 champions, swept fifth seeds Oliver Marach/Mate Pavić before falling to Bob Bryan/Mike Bryan in the last four.

In August top seeds Kubot/Melo won their first ATP Tour team title of 2019. The Polish-Brazilian pairing beat American wild cards Nicholas Monroe and Tennys Sandgren to claim the Winston-Salem Open championship, their 13th doubles crown together.

At the China Open Kubot and Melo recorded their sixth straight victory beating Mao-Xin Gong and Ze Zhang to reach the semi-finals. The defending champions claimed 82 per cent of first-serve points (27/33) and did not face a break point to advance after 68 minutes. Without dropping a set throughout the entire tournament the Polish-Brazilian duo defeated Karen Khachanov and Andrey Rublev for a place in the championship match. In the final they lost to Ivan Dodig and Filip Polášek.

At the 2019 Rolex Shanghai Masters Kubot and Melo rolled past Nicolas Mahut and Édouard Roger-Vasselin to reach their third consecutive final-round appearance in Shanghai. In the final they lost to Mate Pavić and Bruno Soares. Despite that loss they became the second team to qualify for the Nitto ATP Finals following their quarterfinal win at the Shanghai Masters.

In October top seeds Łukasz Kubot/Marcelo Melo defeated third seeds Pierre-Hugues Herbert/Nicolas Mahut to reach their second final at the 2019 Erste Bank Open in Vienna. In the championship match Kubot/Melo lost to the fourth seeds Rajeev Ram/Joe Salisbury. The 2015 Vienna champions had not dropped a set en route to their sixth ATP Tour doubles final of the season and had won 16 of their past 19 matches.

At the Nitto ATP Finals Łukasz Kubot and Marcelo Melo made a winning start to Group Jonas Björkman after beating Ivan Dodig and Filip Polášek. Kubot and Melo hit seven aces, won 76 percent of their first serve points in an hour and 40 minutes of play. They reached their second team semifinal at The O2 Arena after edging out Rajeev Ram and Joe Salisbury to finish Group Jonas Björkman with a 2–1 record.

=== 2020: Kubot's 27th doubles title ===
In February second seeds Kubot and Melo saved two championship points to defeat top seeds Juan Sebastián Cabal and Robert Farah to win the Mexican Open title in Acapulco. This was their 13th ATP Tour team doubles title and the first of this season. Kubot also enjoyed another milestone in Acapulco by picking up his 400th tour-level doubles victory. He accomplished the feat in the semi-final win against Nikola Ćaćić and Dušan Lajović.

In October top seeds Kubot and Melo beat third seeds Raven Klaasen and Oliver Marach to reach the 2020 Bett1Hulks Championship final in Cologne. In the final the Polish–Brazilian duo lost to second seeds Pierre-Hugues Herbert and Nicolas Mahut. Kubot and Melo continued at the Vienna Open where they defeated Jamie Murray and Neal Skupski to win the title. It is the third time that the veteran Polish-Brazilian duo has won the Erste Bank Open title as a team and it was their 15th tour-level title together.

In November, Kubot and Melo played at the 2020 Rolex Paris Masters where they lost to Félix Auger-Aliassime and Hubert Hurkacz in the semifinal. Next they participated in their fourth straight team appearance at the Nitto ATP Finals in London. The Polish-Brazilian duo qualified for the event by defeating Pierre-Hugues Herbert and Nicolas Mahut in the Paris quarter-finals.

Łukasz Kubot and Marcelo Melo finished their 2020 ATP Tour season and four-year partnership with a victory over Wesley Koolhof and Nikola Mektić in the Nitto ATP Finals. They ended their fourth straight team appearance at The O2 with a 1-2 round-robin record. After the match, both Kubot and Melo were emotional. Melo confirmed it was their last match as a tandem on Instagram, writing: "Thanks Kubi! We had many good emotions during our partnership, today was not different. We end our team but we keep friends forever!" Kubot said. "We are very happy and pleased that this is here in London, because we have one of the best memories here from winning Wimbledon."

Kubot and Melo ended the season with a 21–13 team record. The Polish-Brazilian tandem claimed two ATP 500 titles in Acapulco and Vienna. They lifted 15 tour-level trophies during their partnership, including at 2017 Wimbledon and at four ATP Masters 1000 events.

=== 2021: New doubles partner, reunion with Melo ===
At the end of 2020 season Łukasz Kubot and Marcelo Melo amicably split after a successful partnership that lasted more than four years. At the start of 2021 Kubot partnered with Wesley Koolhof to reach the third round at the 2021 Australian Open.

At Rotterdam Open third seeds Kubot and Koolhof defeated Ben McLachlan and Kei Nishikori before losing to Jérémy Chardy and Fabrice Martin in the second round. The pair reached the Masters 1000 quarterfinal at the 2021 Mutua Madrid Open where they were defeated by No. 2 seeds and eventual runners-up Pavić/Mektić.

In Roland Garros, Kubot and Melo decided to return to play together. They lost in the first round to Nicholas Monroe and Frances Tiafoe. But at the 2021 Wimbledon Championships they reached the quarterfinals.

=== 2023: United Cup debut ===
Kubot was the part of the Polish team as the doubles player at the inaugural 2023 United Cup.

== Significant finals ==
=== Grand Slam finals ===
==== Doubles: 3 (2 titles, 1 runner-up) ====
| Result | Year | Championship | Surface | Partner | Opponents | Score |
|---|---|---|---|---|---|---|
| Win | 2014 | Australian Open | Hard | (Sweden) Robert Lindstedt | (United States) Eric Butorac; (South Africa) Raven Klaasen | 6–3, 6–3 |
| Win | 2017 | Wimbledon | Grass | (Brazil) Marcelo Melo | (Austria) Oliver Marach; (Croatia) Mate Pavić | 5–7, 7–5, 7–6^{(7–2)}, 3–6, 13–11 |
| Loss | 2018 | US Open | Hard | (Brazil) Marcelo Melo | (United States) Mike Bryan (United States) Jack Sock | 3–6, 1–6 |

=== Year-end championships ===
==== Doubles: 1 (1 runner-up) ====
| Result | Year | Championship | Surface | Partner | Opponents | Score |
|---|---|---|---|---|---|---|
| Loss | 2017 | ATP Finals, London | Hard (i) | (Brazil) Marcelo Melo | (Finland) Henri Kontinen; (Australia) John Peers | 4–6, 2–6 |

=== Masters 1000 finals ===
==== Doubles: 9 (4 titles, 5 runners-up) ====
| Result | Year | Tournament | Surface | Partner | Opponents | Score |
|---|---|---|---|---|---|---|
| Loss | 2012 | Italian Open | Clay | (Serbia) Janko Tipsarević | (Spain) Marcel Granollers; (Spain) Marc López | 3–6, 2–6 |
| Loss | 2017 | Indian Wells Masters | Hard | (Brazil) Marcelo Melo | (South Africa) Raven Klaasen (United States) Rajeev Ram | 7–6 ^{(7–1)}, 4–6, [8–10] |
| Win | 2017 | Miami Open | Hard | (Brazil) Marcelo Melo | (United States) Nicholas Monroe (United States) Jack Sock | 7–5, 6–3 |
| Win | 2017 | Madrid Open | Clay | (Brazil) Marcelo Melo | (France) Nicolas Mahut (France) Édouard Roger-Vasselin | 7–5, 6–3 |
| Loss | 2017 | Shanghai Masters | Hard | (Brazil) Marcelo Melo | (Finland) Henri Kontinen (Australia) John Peers | 4–6, 2–6 |
| Win | 2017 | Paris Masters | Hard (i) | (Brazil) Marcelo Melo | (Croatia) Ivan Dodig (Spain) Marcel Granollers | 7–6^{(7–3)}, 3–6, [10–6] |
| Win | 2018 | Shanghai Masters | Hard | (Brazil) Marcelo Melo | (United Kingdom) Jamie Murray (Brazil) Bruno Soares | 6–4, 6–2 |
| Loss | 2019 | Indian Wells Masters | Hard | (Brazil) Marcelo Melo | (Croatia) Nikola Mektić (Argentina) Horacio Zeballos | 6–4, 4–6, [3–10] |
| Loss | 2019 | Shanghai Masters | Hard | (Brazil) Marcelo Melo | (Croatia) Mate Pavić (Brazil) Bruno Soares | 4–6, 2–6 |

== ATP career finals ==
=== Singles: 2 (2 runners-up) ===
| Legend Grand Slam tournaments (0–0) ATP World Tour Finals (0–0) ATP World Tour Masters 1000 (0–0) ATP World Tour 500 Series (0–0) ATP World Tour 250 Series (0–2) | Titles by surface Hard (0–0) Clay (0–2) Grass (0–0) | Titles by setting Outdoor (0–2) Indoor (0–0) |

| Result | W–L | Date | Tournament | Tier | Surface | Opponent | Score |
|---|---|---|---|---|---|---|---|
| Loss | 0–1 | May 2009 | Serbia Open, Serbia | 250 Series | Clay | (Serbia) Novak Djokovic | 3–6, 6–7^{(0–7)} |
| Loss | 0–2 | Feb 2010 | Brasil Open, Brazil | 250 Series | Clay | (Spain) Juan Carlos Ferrero | 1–6, 0–6 |

=== Doubles: 48 (27 titles, 21 runners-up) ===
| Legend Grand Slam tournaments (2–1) ATP World Tour Finals (0–1) ATP World Tour Masters 1000 (4–5) ATP World Tour 500 Series (9–7) ATP World Tour 250 Series (12–7) | Titles by surface Hard (13–11) Clay (9–7) Grass (5–2) Carpet (0–1) | Titles by setting Outdoor (21–17) Indoor (6–4) |

| Result | W–L | Date | Tournament | Tier | Surface | Partner | Opponents | Score |
|---|---|---|---|---|---|---|---|---|
| Loss | 0–1 | Apr 2007 | Grand Prix Hassan II, Morocco | International | Clay | (Austria) Oliver Marach | (Australia) Jordan Kerr; (Czech Republic) David Škoch | 6–7^{(4–7)}, 6–1, [4–10] |
| Loss | 0–2 | Oct 2007 | Grand Prix de Tennis de Lyon, France | International | Carpet (i) | (Croatia) Lovro Zovko | (France) Sébastien Grosjean; (France) Jo-Wilfried Tsonga | 4–6, 3–6 |
| Loss | 0–3 | Mar 2009 | Mexican Open, Mexico | 500 Series | Clay | (Austria) Oliver Marach | (Czech Republic) František Čermák; (Slovakia) Michal Mertiňák | 6–4, 4–6, [7–10] |
| Win | 1–3 | Apr 2009 | Grand Prix Hassan II, Morocco | 250 Series | Clay | (Austria) Oliver Marach | (Sweden) Simon Aspelin; (Australia) Paul Hanley | 7–6^{(7–4)}, 3–6, [10–6] |
| Win | 2–3 | May 2009 | Serbia Open, Serbia | 250 Series | Clay | (Austria) Oliver Marach | (Sweden) Johan Brunström; (Netherlands Antilles) Jean-Julien Rojer | 6–2, 7–6^{(7–3)} |
| Win | 3–3 | Nov 2009 | Vienna Open, Austria | 250 Series | Hard (i) | (Austria) Oliver Marach | (Austria) Julian Knowle; (Austria) Jürgen Melzer | 2–6, 6–4, [11–9] |
| Win | 4–3 | Feb 2010 | Chile Open, Chile | 250 Series | Clay | (Austria) Oliver Marach | (Italy) Potito Starace; (Argentina) Horacio Zeballos | 6–4, 6–0 |
| Loss | 4–4 | Feb 2010 | Brasil Open, Brazil | 250 Series | Clay | (Austria) Oliver Marach | (Uruguay) Pablo Cuevas; (Spain) Marcel Granollers | 5–7, 4–6 |
| Win | 5–4 | Feb 2010 | Mexican Open, Mexico | 500 Series | Clay | (Austria) Oliver Marach | (Italy) Fabio Fognini (Italy) Potito Starace | 6–0, 6–0 |
| Win | 6–4 | Sep 2010 | Romanian Open, Romania | 250 Series | Clay | (Argentina) Juan Ignacio Chela | (Spain) Marcel Granollers (Spain) Santiago Ventura | 6–2, 5–7, [13–11] |
| Loss | 6–5 | Feb 2011 | Chile Open, Chile | 250 Series | Clay | (Austria) Oliver Marach | (Brazil) Bruno Soares; (Brazil) Marcelo Melo | 3–6, 6–7^{(3–7)} |
| Loss | 6–6 | Apr 2012 | Romanian Open, Romania | 250 Series | Clay | (France) Jérémy Chardy | (Sweden) Robert Lindstedt; (Romania) Horia Tecău | 6–7^{(2–7)}, 3–6 |
| Loss | 6–7 | May 2012 | Italian Open, Italy | Masters 1000 | Clay | (Serbia) Janko Tipsarević | (Spain) Marcel Granollers (Spain) Marc López | 3–6, 2–6 |
| Win | 7–7 | Jul 2012 | Stuttgart Open, Germany | 250 Series | Clay | (France) Jérémy Chardy | (Slovakia) Michal Mertiňák (Brazil) André Sá | 6–1, 6–3 |
| Win | 8–7 | Feb 2013 | Mexican Open, Mexico (2) | 500 Series | Clay | (Spain) David Marrero | (Italy) Simone Bolelli (Italy) Fabio Fognini | 7–5, 6–2 |
| Win | 9–7 | Jan 2014 | Australian Open, Australia | Grand Slam | Hard | (Sweden) Robert Lindstedt | (United States) Eric Butorac; (South Africa) Raven Klaasen | 6–3, 6–3 |
| Win | 10–7 | Jun 2015 | Rosmalen Championships, Netherlands | 250 Series | Grass | (Croatia) Ivo Karlović | (France) Pierre-Hugues Herbert; (France) Nicolas Mahut | 6–2, 7–6^{(11–9)} |
| Win | 11–7 | Jul 2015 | Swedish Open, Sweden | 250 Series | Clay | (France) Jérémy Chardy | (Colombia) Juan Sebastián Cabal; (Colombia) Robert Farah | 6–7^{(6–8)}, 6–3, [10–8] |
| Win | 12–7 | Sep 2015 | Moselle Open, France | 250 Series | Hard (i) | (France) Édouard Roger-Vasselin | (France) Pierre-Hugues Herbert (France) Nicolas Mahut | 2–6, 6–3, [10–7] |
| Win | 13–7 | Oct 2015 | Vienna Open, Austria (2) | 500 Series | Hard (i) | (Brazil) Marcelo Melo | (United Kingdom) Jamie Murray; (Australia) John Peers | 4–6, 7–6^{(7–3)}, [10–6] |
| Loss | 13–8 | May 2016 | Estoril Open, Portugal | 250 Series | Clay | (Poland) Marcin Matkowski | (United States) Eric Butorac; (United States) Scott Lipsky | 4–6, 6–3, [8–10] |
| Loss | 13–9 | Jun 2016 | Halle Open, Germany | 500 Series | Grass | (Austria) Alexander Peya | (South Africa) Raven Klaasen (United States) Rajeev Ram | 6–7^{(5–7)}, 2–6 |
| Loss | 13–10 | Jul 2016 | Washington Open, US | 500 Series | Hard | (Austria) Alexander Peya | (Canada) Daniel Nestor (France) Édouard Roger-Vasselin | 6–7^{(3–7)}, 6–7^{(4–7)} |
| Win | 14–10 | Oct 2016 | Vienna Open, Austria (3) | 500 Series | Hard (i) | (Brazil) Marcelo Melo | (Austria) Oliver Marach (France) Fabrice Martin | 4–6, 6–3, [13–11] |
| Loss | 14–11 | Mar 2017 | Indian Wells Masters, US | Masters 1000 | Hard | (Brazil) Marcelo Melo | (South Africa) Raven Klaasen (United States) Rajeev Ram | 7–6^{(7–1)}, 4–6, [8–10] |
| Win | 15–11 | Apr 2017 | Miami Open, US | Masters 1000 | Hard | (Brazil) Marcelo Melo | (United States) Nicholas Monroe; (United States) Jack Sock | 7–5, 6–3 |
| Win | 16–11 | May 2017 | Madrid Open, Spain | Masters 1000 | Clay | (Brazil) Marcelo Melo | (France) Nicolas Mahut (France) Édouard Roger-Vasselin | 7–5, 6–3 |
| Win | 17–11 | Jun 2017 | Rosmalen Championships, Netherlands (2) | 250 Series | Grass | (Brazil) Marcelo Melo | (South Africa) Raven Klaasen (United States) Rajeev Ram | 6–3, 6–4 |
| Win | 18–11 | Jun 2017 | Halle Open, Germany | 500 Series | Grass | (Brazil) Marcelo Melo | (Germany) Alexander Zverev; (Germany) Mischa Zverev | 5–7, 6–3, [10–8] |
| Win | 19–11 | Jul 2017 | Wimbledon, UK | Grand Slam | Grass | (Brazil) Marcelo Melo | (Austria) Oliver Marach (Croatia) Mate Pavić | 5–7, 7–5, 7–6^{(7–2)}, 3–6, 13–11 |
| Loss | 19–12 | Aug 2017 | Washington Open, US | 500 Series | Hard | (Brazil) Marcelo Melo | (Finland) Henri Kontinen (Australia) John Peers | 6–7^{(5–7)}, 4–6 |
| Loss | 19–13 | Oct 2017 | Shanghai Masters, China | Masters 1000 | Hard | (Brazil) Marcelo Melo | (Finland) Henri Kontinen (Australia) John Peers | 4–6, 2–6 |
| Win | 20–13 | Nov 2017 | Paris Masters, France | Masters 1000 | Hard (i) | (Brazil) Marcelo Melo | (Croatia) Ivan Dodig (Spain) Marcel Granollers | 7–6^{(7–3)}, 3–6, [10–6] |
| Loss | 20–14 | Nov 2017 | ATP Finals, UK | Tour Finals | Hard (i) | (Brazil) Marcelo Melo | (Finland) Henri Kontinen (Australia) John Peers | 4–6, 2–6 |
| Win | 21–14 | Jan 2018 | Sydney International, Australia | 250 Series | Hard | (Brazil) Marcelo Melo | (Germany) Jan-Lennard Struff; (Serbia) Viktor Troicki | 6–3, 6–4 |
| Win | 22–14 | Jun 2018 | Halle Open, Germany (2) | 500 Series | Grass | (Brazil) Marcelo Melo | (Germany) Alexander Zverev (Germany) Mischa Zverev | 7–6^{(7–1)}, 6–4 |
| Loss | 22–15 | Sep 2018 | US Open, US | Grand Slam | Hard | (Brazil) Marcelo Melo | (United States) Mike Bryan (United States) Jack Sock | 3–6, 1–6 |
| Win | 23–15 | Oct 2018 | China Open, China | 500 Series | Hard | (Brazil) Marcelo Melo | (Austria) Oliver Marach (Croatia) Mate Pavić | 6–1, 6–4 |
| Win | 24–15 | Oct 2018 | Shanghai Masters, China | Masters 1000 | Hard | (Brazil) Marcelo Melo | (United Kingdom) Jamie Murray (Brazil) Bruno Soares | 6–4, 6–2 |
| Loss | 24–16 | Mar 2019 | Indian Wells Masters, US | Masters 1000 | Hard | (Brazil) Marcelo Melo | (Croatia) Nikola Mektić (Argentina) Horacio Zeballos | 6–4, 4–6, [3–10] |
| Loss | 24–17 | Jun 2019 | Halle Open, Germany | 500 Series | Grass | (Brazil) Marcelo Melo | (South Africa) Raven Klaasen (New Zealand) Michael Venus | 6–4, 3–6, [4–10] |
| Win | 25–17 | Aug 2019 | Winston-Salem Open, United States | 250 Series | Hard | (Brazil) Marcelo Melo | (United States) Nicholas Monroe (United States) Tennys Sandgren | 6–7^{(6–8)}, 6–1, [10–3] |
| Loss | 25–18 | Oct 2019 | China Open, China | 500 Series | Hard | (Brazil) Marcelo Melo | (Croatia) Ivan Dodig (Slovakia) Filip Polášek | 3–6, 6–7^{(4−7)} |
| Loss | 25–19 | Oct 2019 | Shanghai Masters, China | Masters 1000 | Hard | (Brazil) Marcelo Melo | (Croatia) Mate Pavić (Brazil) Bruno Soares | 4–6, 2–6 |
| Loss | 25–20 | Oct 2019 | Vienna Open, Austria | 500 Series | Hard (i) | (Brazil) Marcelo Melo | (United States) Rajeev Ram (United Kingdom) Joe Salisbury | 4–6, 7–6^{(7–5)}, [5–10] |
| Win | 26–20 | Feb 2020 | Mexican Open, Mexico (3) | 500 Series | Hard | (Brazil) Marcelo Melo | (Colombia) Juan Sebastián Cabal (Colombia) Robert Farah | 7–6^{(8–6)}, 6–7^{(4–7)}, [11–9] |
| Loss | 26–21 | Oct 2020 | Cologne Indoors, Germany | 250 Series | Hard (i) | (Brazil) Marcelo Melo | (France) Pierre-Hugues Herbert (France) Nicolas Mahut | 4–6, 4–6 |
| Win | 27–21 | Nov 2020 | Vienna Open, Austria (4) | 500 Series | Hard (i) | (Brazil) Marcelo Melo | (United Kingdom) Jamie Murray (United Kingdom) Neal Skupski | 7–6^{(7–5)}, 7–5 |

== ATP Challenger and ITF Futures finals ==
=== Singles: 10 (6–4) ===
| Legend (singles) ATP Challenger Tour (2–3) ITF Futures Tour (4–1) | Finals by surface Hard (4–2) Clay (2–2) Grass (0–0) Carpet (0–0) |

| Result | W–L | Date | Tournament | Tier | Surface | Opponent | Score |
|---|---|---|---|---|---|---|---|
| Loss | 0–1 | Aug 2001 | Sopot, Poland | Challenger | Clay | (Spain) David Ferrer | 5–7, 6–3, 2–6 |
| Loss | 0–2 | Jul 2002 | Germany F9, Zell | Futures | Clay | (Algeria) Slimane Saoudi | 5–7, 3–6 |
| Win | 1–2 | Jan 2004 | Germany F2, Stuttgart | Futures | Hard | (France) Jérôme Haehnel | 7–6^{(7–4)}, 6–3 |
| Win | 2–2 | Jan 2004 | Germany F3, Oberhaching | Futures | Hard | (Morocco) Mounir El Aarej | 7–6^{(10–8)}, 6–1 |
| Win | 3–2 | Oct 2004 | Colombia F4, Bogotá | Futures | Clay | (Brazil) Júlio Silva | 4–6, 6–2, 6–2 |
| Win | 4–2 | Nov 2004 | Czech Republic F5 | Futures | Hard | (Czech Republic) Jan Mertl | 6–3, 6–1 |
| Loss | 4–3 | Feb 2005 | Joplin, United States | Challenger | Hard | (Canada) Frédéric Niemeyer | 6–4, 2–6, 3–6 |
| Win | 5–3 | Sep 2005 | Donetsk, Ukraine | Challenger | Hard | (Austria) Alexander Peya | 6–4, 6–2 |
| Loss | 5–4 | Apr 2006 | Dharwad, India | Challenger | Hard | (Serbia and Montenegro) Viktor Troicki | 6–2, 4–6, 4–6 |
| Win | 6–4 | Jul 2008 | Oberstaufen, Germany | Challenger | Clay | (Argentina) Juan Pablo Brzezicki | 6–3, 6–4 |

=== Doubles: 32 (20–12) ===
| Legend (doubles) ATP Challenger Tour (18–10) ITF Futures Tour (2–2) | Finals by surface Hard (12–7) Clay (8–5) Grass (0–0) Carpet (0–0) |

| Result | W–L | Date | Tournament | Tier | Surface | Partner | Opponents | Score |
|---|---|---|---|---|---|---|---|---|
| Win | 1–0 | Dec 2002 | Czech Republic F10 Ostrava | Futures | Hard | (Poland) Mariusz Fyrstenberg | (Czech Republic) Jaroslav Pospíšil (Czech Republic) Jiri Vencl | 2–6, 6–3, 6–4 |
| Win | 2–0 | Jan 2003 | Germany F1A Munich | Futures | Hard | (Poland) Mariusz Fyrstenberg | (United States) Jason Marshall; (Germany) Lars Uebel | 7–5, 5–7, 6–3 |
| Loss | 2–1 | May 2003 | Hungary F1 Miskolc | Futures | Clay | (Italy) Leonardo Azzaro | (Hungary) Kornél Bardóczky; (Hungary) Gergely Kisgyörgy | 6–7^{(6–8)}, 3–6 |
| Win | 3–1 | Jul 2003 | Valladolid, Spain | Challenger | Hard | (Japan) Jun Kato | (Russia) Philipp Mukhometov; (United States) Tripp Phillips | 4–6, 6–0, 6–1 |
| Loss | 3–2 | Aug 2003 | Saransk, Russia | Challenger | Clay | (Ukraine) Orest Tereshchuk | (Hungary) Kornél Bardóczky; (Czech Republic) Martin Štěpánek | 6–7^{(3–7)}, 3–6 |
| Loss | 3–3 | Jan 2004 | Germany F3 Oberhaching | Futures | Hard | (Slovakia) Igor Zelenay | (Denmark) Frederik Nielsen (Denmark) Rasmur Norby | 4–6, 7–6^{(8–6)}, 0–6 |
| Loss | 3–4 | Feb 2004 | Wrocław, Poland | Challenger | Hard | (Poland) Bartlomiej Dabrowski | (Slovakia) Dominik Hrbatý; (Germany) Michael Kohlmann | 5–7, 3–6 |
| Win | 4–4 | Apr 2004 | Canberra, Australia | Challenger | Clay | (Austria) Zbynek Mlynarik | (Australia) Stephen Huss; (Australia) Peter Luczak | 7–6^{(7–3)}, 6–2 |
| Loss | 4–5 | May 2004 | Ostrava, Czech Republic | Challenger | Clay | (Czech Republic) Tomáš Zíb | (Finland) Tuomas Ketola; (Czech Republic) Petr Pála | 4–6, 4–6 |
| Loss | 4–6 | Oct 2004 | Quito, Ecuador | Challenger | Clay | (Germany) Frank Moser | (Mexico) Alejandro Hernández; (Mexico) Santiago González | 6–2, 2–6, 4–6 |
| Win | 5–6 | Feb 2005 | Joplin, United States | Challenger | Hard | (South Africa) Rik de Voest | (United States) Nicholas Monroe (United States) Jeremy Wurtzman | 7–6^{(7–4)}, 6–4 |
| Win | 6–6 | Mar 2005 | San Luis Potosí, Mexico | Challenger | Clay | (Austria) Oliver Marach | (Argentina) Juan Pablo Brzezicki; (Argentina) Juan Pablo Guzmán | 6–1, 3–6, 6–3 |
| Loss | 6–7 | Apr 2005 | Mexico City, Mexico | Challenger | Hard | (South Africa) Rik de Voest | (United States) Rajeev Ram; (United States) Bobby Reynolds | 1–6, 7–6^{(9–7)}, 6–7^{(4–7)} |
| Win | 7–7 | Jul 2005 | Poznań, Poland | Challenger | Clay | (Poland) Filip Urban | (Chile) Adrián García; (Italy) Tomas Tenconi | 6–7^{(5–7)}, 6–3, 6–2 |
| Loss | 7–8 | Oct 2005 | Seoul, South Korea | Challenger | Hard | (South Africa) Rik de Voest | (Austria) Alexander Peya; (Germany) Björn Phau | 6–0, 4–6, [7–10] |
| Win | 8–8 | Jan 2006 | Doha, Qatar | Challenger | Hard | (Austria) Oliver Marach | (Kazakhstan) Alexey Kedryuk; (Ukraine) Orest Tereshchuk | 6–4, 6–1 |
| Win | 9–8 | Apr 2006 | Naples, Italy | Challenger | Clay | (Czech Republic) Tomáš Cibulec | (Italy) Fabio Fognini; (Italy) Simone Bolelli | 7–5, 4–6, [10–7] |
| Loss | 9–9 | Mar 2007 | Cherbourg, France | Challenger | Hard | (Belgium) Dick Norman | (Slovakia) Michal Mertiňák; (Czech Republic) Robin Vik | 2–6, 4–6 |
| Win | 10–9 | Apr 2007 | Casablanca, Morocco | Challenger | Clay | (Austria) Oliver Marach | (Slovakia) Michal Mertiňák; (Czech Republic) Robin Vik | 6–3, 6–3 |
| Win | 11–9 | May 2007 | Tunis, Tunisia | Challenger | Clay | (Austria) Oliver Marach | (Spain) Marc Fornell Mestres; (Algeria) Lamine Ouahab | 6–2, 6–2 |
| Win | 12–9 | Apr 2008 | Busan, South Korea | Challenger | Hard | (South Africa) Rik de Voest | (Australia) Adam Feeney (Australia) Rameez Junaid | 6–3, 6–3 |
| Win | 13–9 | May 2008 | Lanzarote, Spain | Challenger | Hard | (South Africa) Rik de Voest | (Luxembourg) Gilles Müller; (Pakistan) Aisam Qureshi | 6–2, 7–6^{(7–2)} |
| Win | 14–9 | May 2008 | Fergana, Uzbekistan | Challenger | Hard | (Russia) Konstantin Kravchuk | (Russia) Alexander Krasnorutskiy; (Uzbekistan) Vaja Uzakov | 6–4, 6–1 |
| Win | 15–9 | Jun 2008 | Prostějov, Czech Republic | Challenger | Clay | (South Africa) Rik de Voest | (South Africa) Chris Haggard; (France) Nicolas Tourte | 6–2, 6–2 |
| Loss | 15–10 | Aug 2008 | Bukhara, Uzbekistan | Challenger | Hard | (Austria) Oliver Marach | (Russia) Pavel Chekhov; (Russia) Mikhail Elgin | 6–7^{(2–7)}, 1–6 |
| Win | 16–10 | Aug 2008 | Qarshi, Uzbekistan | Challenger | Hard | (Austria) Oliver Marach | (Austria) Andreas Haider-Maurer; (Austria) Philipp Oswald | 6–4, 6–4 |
| Loss | 16–11 | Sep 2008 | Szczecin, Poland | Challenger | Clay | (Austria) Oliver Marach | (Spain) David Marrero Santana (Poland) Dawid Olejniczak | 6–7^{(4–7)}, 3–6 |
| Win | 17–11 | Oct 2008 | Seoul, South Korea | Challenger | Hard | (Austria) Oliver Marach | (Thailand) Sanchai Ratiwatana; (Thailand) Sonchat Ratiwatana | 7–5, 4–6, [10–6] |
| Win | 18–11 | Nov 2008 | Bratislava, Slovakia | Challenger | Hard | (Czech Republic) František Čermák | (Germany) Philipp Petzschner; (Austria) Alexander Peya | 6–4, 6–4 |
| Loss | 18–12 | Nov 2008 | Dnipropetrovsk, Ukraine | Challenger | Hard | (Austria) Oliver Marach | (Argentina) Guillermo Cañas; (Russia) Dmitry Tursunov | 3–6, 6–7^{(5–7)} |
| Win | 19–12 | Nov 2008 | Helsinki, Finland | Challenger | Hard | (Austria) Oliver Marach | (United States) Eric Butorac; (Croatia) Lovro Zovko | 6–7^{(2–7)}, 7–6^{(9–7)}, [10–6] |
| Win | 20–12 | Nov 2008 | Cancún, Mexico | Challenger | Clay | (Austria) Oliver Marach | (Chinese Taipei) Hsin-Han Lee; (Chinese Taipei) Tsung-Hua Yang | 7–5, 6–2 |

== Performance timelines ==
Key
| W | F | SF | QF | #R | RR | Q# | P# | DNQ | A | Z# | PO | G | S | B | NMS | NTI | P | NH |

(W) winner; (F) finalist; (SF) semifinalist; (QF) quarterfinalist; (#R) rounds 4, 3, 2, 1; (RR) round-robin stage; (Q#) qualification round; (P#) preliminary round; (DNQ) did not qualify; (A) absent; (Z#) Davis/Fed Cup Zonal Group (with number indication) or (PO) play-off; (G) gold, (S) silver or (B) bronze Olympic/Paralympic medal; (NMS) not a Masters tournament; (NTI) not a Tier I tournament; (P) postponed; (NH) not held; (SR) strike rate (events won / competed); (W–L) win–loss record.
To avoid confusion and double counting, these charts are updated at the conclusion of a tournament or when the player's participation has ended.

=== Singles ===
| Tournament | 2005 | 2006 | 2007 | 2008 | 2009 | 2010 | 2011 | 2012 | 2013 | 2014 | 2015 | 2016 | SR | W–L |
|---|---|---|---|---|---|---|---|---|---|---|---|---|---|---|
Grand Slam tournaments
| Australian Open | Q1 | A | Q3 | A | Q3 | 4R* | 2R | 1R | 1R | 1R | Q3 | A | 0 / 5 | 3–5 |
| French Open | Q2 | Q1 | Q1 | A | 1R | 1R | 3R | 3R | 2R | 1R | A | A | 0 / 6 | 5–6 |
| Wimbledon | Q1 | Q2 | Q1 | Q1 | Q1 | 2R | 4R | 2R | QF* | 3R | A | A | 0 / 5 | 10–5 |
| US Open | Q2 | 3R | Q3 | A | Q2 | 1R | A | 1R | 1R | A | A | A | 0 / 4 | 2–4 |
| Win–loss | 0–0 | 2–1 | 0–0 | 0–0 | 0–1 | 3–4 | 6–3 | 3–4 | 4–4 | 2–3 | 0–0 | 0–0 | 0 / 20 | 20–20 |
ATP Masters Series 1000
| Indian Wells | A | A | A | A | A | A | 2R | 2R | 1R | 1R | Q1 | A | 0 / 4 | 2–4 |
| Miami | A | A | A | A | A | 1R | A | 1R | 2R | 1R | A | A | 0 / 4 | 1–4 |
| Monte Carlo | A | A | A | A | A | 1R | Q1 | 1R | Q1 | Q2 | A | A | 0 / 2 | 0–2 |
| Madrid | A | A | A | A | A | 1R | Q2 | A | Q1 | 3R | A | A | 0 / 2 | 1–2 |
| Rome | A | A | A | A | A | 1R | 2R | 2R | A | Q1 | A | A | 0 / 3 | 2–3 |
| Canada | A | A | A | A | Q1 | A | A | A | Q2 | A | A | A | 0 / 0 | 0–0 |
| Cincinnati | A | A | A | A | 1R | 1R | A | 1R | Q1 | A | A | A | 0 / 3 | 0–3 |
| Shanghai | Not held | | | | 1R | 1R | 1R | 1R | Q2 | A | 1R | A | 0 / 5 | 0–5 |
| Paris | A | A | A | A | 2R | A | Q2 | Q1 | Q2 | A | A | A | 0 / 1 | 1–1 |
| Win–loss | 0–0 | 0–0 | 0–0 | 0–0 | 1–3 | 0–6 | 2–3 | 2–6 | 1–2 | 1–3 | 0–1 | 0–0 | 0 / 24 | 7–24 |
National representation
| Summer Olympics | Not held | | | A | Not held | | | 1R | Not held | | | A | 0 / 1 | 0–1 |
Career statistics
| Titles / Finals | 0 / 0 | 0 / 0 | 0 / 0 | 0 / 0 | 0 / 1 | 0 / 1 | 0 / 0 | 0 / 0 | 0 / 0 | 0 / 0 | 0 / 0 | 0 / 0 | 0 / 2 | |
| Year-end ranking | 142 | 125 | 222 | 209 | 101 | 70 | 57 | 74 | 72 | 168 | 471 | 908 | | |

* At the 2010 Australian Open, Kubot's third-round match was a walkover |* At the 2013 Wimbledon Championships, Kubot's second-round match was a walkover

=== Doubles ===
| Tournament | 2001 | 2002 | 2003 | 2004 | 2005 | 2006 | 2007 | 2008 | 2009 | 2010 | 2011 | 2012 | 2013 | 2014 | 2015 | 2016 | 2017 | 2018 | 2019 | 2020 | 2021 | 2022 | 2023 | SR | W–L |
|---|---|---|---|---|---|---|---|---|---|---|---|---|---|---|---|---|---|---|---|---|---|---|---|---|---|
Grand Slam tournaments
| Australian Open | A | A | A | A | A | A | 3R | A | SF | 3R | QF | 1R | 3R | W | 2R | 2R | 3R | QF | QF | 2R | 3R | A | A | 1 / 14 | 32–13 |
| French Open | A | A | A | A | A | A | 3R | 1R | 2R | QF | 1R | 2R | 1R | QF | 3R | SF | 2R | 3R | 3R | 2R | 1R | 2R | A | 0 / 16 | 23–16 |
| Wimbledon | A | A | A | 2R | Q1 | 2R | 2R | 2R | QF | 1R | 1R | A | 3R | 2R | 3R | 1R | W | 2R | QF | NH | QF | 2R | A | 1 / 16 | 25–15 |
| US Open | A | A | A | A | A | 1R | 1R | A | 1R | QF | A | 2R | 1R | A | 2R | QF | 2R | F | 3R | 1R | 1R | 1R | A | 0 / 14 | 15–14 |
| Win–loss | 0–0 | 0–0 | 0–0 | 1–1 | 0–0 | 1–2 | 5–4 | 1–2 | 8–4 | 8–4 | 3–3 | 2–3 | 4–4 | 10–2 | 6–4 | 7–4 | 10–3 | 11–4 | 10–4 | 2–3 | 4–4 | 2–3 | 0–0 | 2 / 60 | 95–58 |
Year-end championship
| ATP Finals | Did not qualify | | | | | | | | RR | RR | Did not qualify | | | SF | DNQ | | F | RR | SF | RR | Did not qualify | | | 0 / 7 | 13–12 |
ATP Masters Series 1000
| Indian Wells | A | A | A | A | A | A | A | A | 2R | A | 2R | 1R | QF | 2R | 1R | 2R | F | 1R | F | NH | A | 1R | A | 0 / 11 | 14–11 |
| Miami | A | A | A | A | A | A | A | A | A | 1R | A | QF | 2R | 2R | A | 1R | W | 1R | SF | NH | 1R | 1R | A | 1 / 10 | 12–9 |
| Monte Carlo | A | A | A | A | A | A | A | A | A | QF | QF | A | 1R | 2R | A | 2R | QF | 2R | QF | NH | 2R | A | A | 0 / 9 | 6–9 |
| Madrid | NH | A | A | A | A | A | A | A | A | QF | 2R | A | SF | 2R | A | 2R | W | QF | QF | NH | QF | 1R | A | 1 / 10 | 13–9 |
| Rome | A | A | A | A | A | A | A | A | A | SF | QF | F | A | 2R | A | A | QF | QF | SF | 1R | 2R | 1R | A | 0 / 10 | 13–10 |
| Canada | A | A | A | A | A | A | A | A | QF | A | A | A | 1R | A | A | 1R | 2R | 2R | 1R | NH | 2R | A | A | 0 / 7 | 2–7 |
| Cincinnati | A | A | A | A | A | A | A | A | SF | SF | A | 2R | 2R | A | A | 1R | SF | QF | QF | 2R | 1R | A | A | 0 / 10 | 12–9 |
| Shanghai | Not held | | | | | | | | QF | SF | 1R | A | A | 2R | SF | 2R | F | W | F | Not held | | | A | 1 / 9 | 16–8 |
| Paris | A | A | A | A | A | A | A | A | A | QF | 1R | 1R | 1R | 2R | A | A | W | QF | 1R | SF | A | 1R | A | 1 / 10 | 8–9 |
| Win–loss | 0–0 | 0–0 | 0–0 | 0–0 | 0–0 | 0–0 | 0–0 | 0–0 | 4–4 | 9–7 | 3–6 | 7–4 | 7–7 | 4–7 | 2–2 | 2–7 | 22–6 | 8–8 | 20–9 | 3–3 | 4–6 | 0–5 | 0–0 | 4 / 86 | 96–81 |
National representation
| Summer Olympics | Not held | | | A | Not held | | | A | Not held | | | A | Not held | | | 2R | Not held | | | | 1R | NH | A | 0 / 2 | 1–2 |
Career statistics
| | 2001 | 2002 | 2003 | 2004 | 2005 | 2006 | 2007 | 2008 | 2009 | 2010 | 2011 | 2012 | 2013 | 2014 | 2015 | 2016 | 2017 | 2018 | 2019 | 2020 | 2021 | 2022 | 2023 | Career | |
| Titles / finals | 0 / 0 | 0 / 0 | 0 / 0 | 0 / 0 | 0 / 0 | 0 / 0 | 0 / 2 | 0 / 0 | 3 / 4 | 3 / 4 | 0 / 1 | 1 / 3 | 1 / 1 | 1 / 1 | 4 / 4 | 1 / 4 | 6 / 10 | 4 / 5 | 1 / 6 | 2 / 3 | 0 / 0 | 0 / 0 | 0 / 0 | 27 / 48 | |
| Overall win–loss | 1–1 | 0–1 | 0–0 | 1–2 | 2–1 | 9–9 | 16–10 | 1–2 | 42–21 | 38–24 | 13–21 | 22–19 | 19–17 | 20–18 | 33–14 | 36–25 | 51–21 | 41–23 | 49–24 | 21–16 | 16–18 | 4–17 | 0–1 | 435–305 | |
| Year-end ranking | 448 | 533 | 217 | 137 | 135 | 64 | 45 | 72 | 12 | 10 | 53 | 39 | 37 | 18 | 29 | 24 | 2 | 9 | 6 | 10 | 34 | 299 | 1140 | 58.78% | |

Awards
| Preceded by: (United Kingdom) Jamie Murray &; (Brazil) Bruno Soares | ATP Doubles Team of the Year (with (Brazil) Marcelo Melo); 2017 | Succeeded by: (Austria) Oliver Marach &; (Croatia) Mate Pavić |
| Preceded by: (United Kingdom) Jamie Murray &; (Brazil) Bruno Soares | ITF Men's doubles World Champion (with (Brazil) Marcelo Melo); 2017 | Succeeded by: (United States) Mike Bryan &; (United States) Jack Sock |
