= 2009 Serbia Open =

- Date: May 2 – May 10
- Edition: 1st
- Category: ATP World Tour 250 series
- Prize money: €398,250
- Surface: Clay / Outdoor
- Location: Belgrade, Serbia

Champions

Singles
- (Serbia) Novak Djokovic

Doubles
- (Poland) Łukasz Kubot / (Austria) Oliver Marach
Serbia Open	· 2010 →

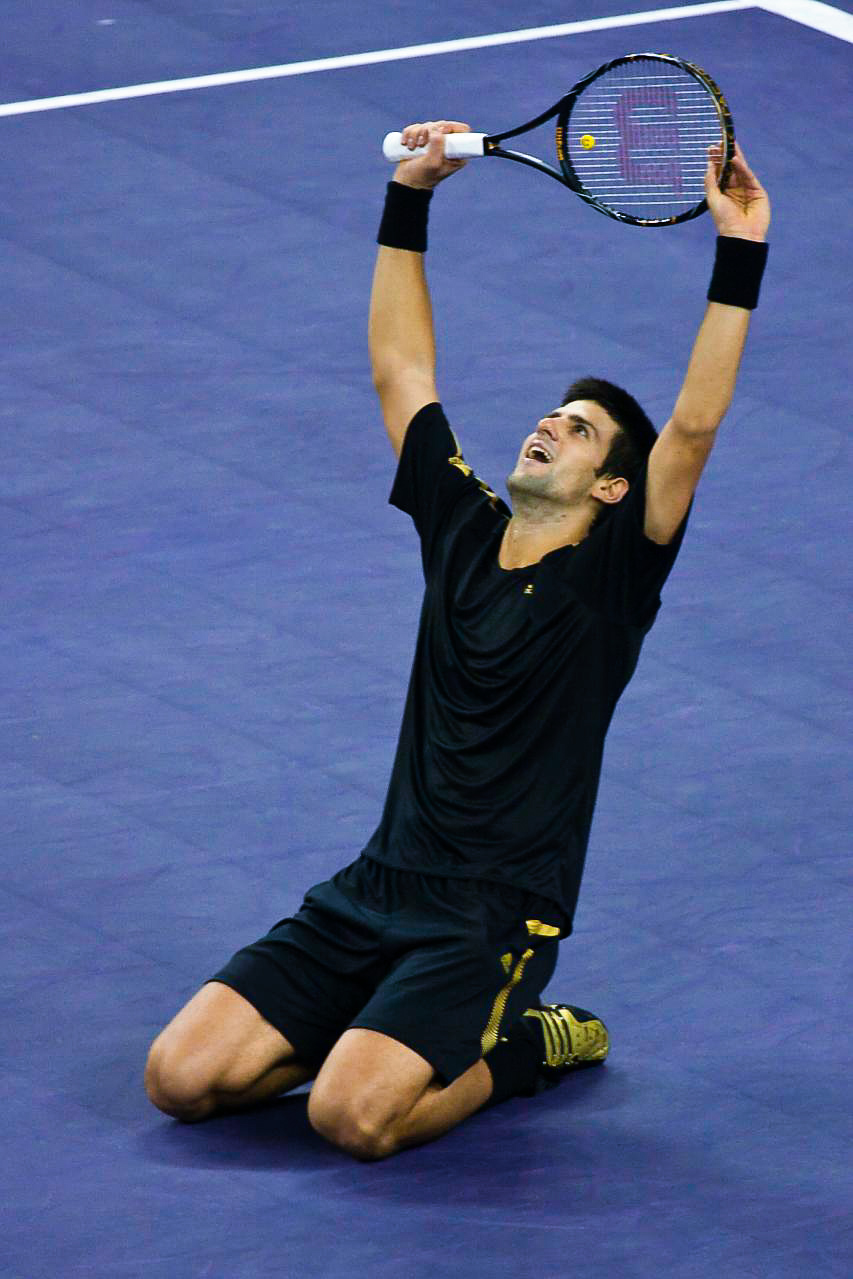
2009 singles winner Novak Djokovic

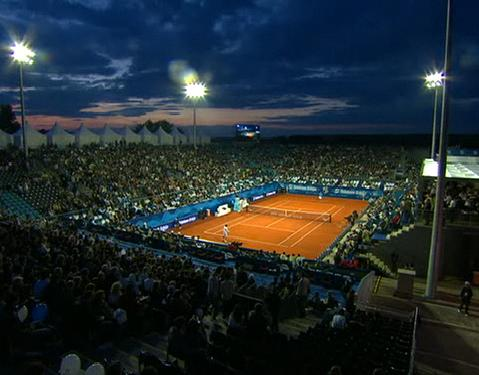
Centre court at the Serbia Open during a second round night session encounter between Novak Djokovic and Janko Tipsarević

The 2009 Serbia Open (also known as Serbia Open powered by Telekom Srbija for sponsorship reasons) was a men's tennis tournament played on outdoor clay courts. It was the first edition of the event known that year as the Serbia Open, and was a part of the ATP World Tour 250 series of the 2009 ATP World Tour. It took place at the Milan Gale Muškatirović complex in Belgrade, Serbia, from May 2 through May 10, 2009.

The singles draw was headlined by the tournament's host, Association of Tennis Professionals (ATP) No. 3, 2008 Tennis Masters Cup, Dubai winner and recent Miami, Monte Carlo and Rome runner-up Novak Djokovic from Serbia. Other featured stars included reigning Nottingham champion Ivo Karlović, and Gstaad and Umag finalist Igor Andreev. Other seeds included Andreas Seppi from Italy, Belgrade Challenger winner Viktor Troicki, Ivan Ljubičić, Arnaud Clément and Christophe Rochus.

The doubles draw was headlined by 2008 year-end World No. 1 doubles team, 2008 Tennis Masters Cup, Rotterdam, Monte Carlo, Barcelona and Rome champions Daniel Nestor and Nenad Zimonjić, both born in Belgrade (although Nestor grew up from early childhood in Canada and represents that country). Also competing were Acapulco runners-up Łukasz Kubot and Oliver Marach, Stephen Huss and Ross Hutchins, and Simon Aspelin and Paul Hanley.

== Champions ==
=== Singles ===
(Serbia) Novak Djokovic defeated (Poland) Łukasz Kubot, 6–3, 7–6^{(7–0)}

- It was Djokovic's 2nd title of the year, and his 13th overall.

=== Doubles ===
(Poland) Łukasz Kubot / (Austria) Oliver Marach defeated (Sweden) Johan Brunström / (Netherlands Antilles) Jean-Julien Rojer, 6–2, 7–6^{(7–3)}

== Entrants ==
=== Seeds ===
Player	Nationality	Ranking*	Seeding
Novak Djokovic	Serbia	3	1
Ivo Karlović	Croatia	24	2
Igor Andreev	Russia	25	3
Andreas Seppi	Italy	37	4
Viktor Troicki	Serbia	40	5
Ivan Ljubičić	Croatia	52	6
Arnaud Clément	France	54	7
Christophe Rochus	Belgium	55	8

- Seedings are based on the rankings of April 27, 2009.

=== Other entrants ===
The following players received wildcards into the main draw:

- (Serbia) Filip Krajinović
- (Serbia) Arsenije Zlatanović
- (Cyprus) Marcos Baghdatis

The following players received entry from the qualifying draw:

- (Romania) Victor Crivoi
- (Italy) Flavio Cipolla
- (Spain) Santiago Ventura
- (Slovakia) Dominik Hrbatý
- (Poland) Łukasz Kubot (lucky loser)
