= Arsenije Zlatanović =

Serbian tennis player

- Country (sports): Serbia
- Residence: Belgrade, Serbia
- Born: 4 December 1989 (age 35) Belgrade, SR Serbia, SFR Yugoslavia
- Height: 1.93 m (6 ft 4 in)
- Turned pro: 2006
- Plays: Right-handed
- Prize money: $44,877

Singles
- Career record: 0–1 (at ATP Tour level, Grand Slam level, and in Davis Cup)
- Career titles: 0 ITF
- Highest ranking: No. 609 (30 April 2012)

Doubles
- Career record: 0–0 (at ATP Tour level, Grand Slam level, and in Davis Cup)
- Career titles: 2 ITF
- Highest ranking: No. 690 (23 August 2010)
- Last updated on: 29 August 2022.

Arsenije Zlatanović (Serbian pronunciation: [zlatǎːnoʋitɕ]; born 4 December 1989) is a Serbian inactive tennis player.

Zlatanović has a career high ATP singles ranking of 609 achieved on 30 April 2012. He also has a career high ATP doubles ranking of 690 achieved on 23 August 2010.

Zlatanović made his ATP main draw debut at the 2009 Serbia Open. He was defeated by Łukasz Kubot in the first round.

== ATP Challenger Tour and ITF Futures finals ==
=== Singles: 1 (0–1) ===
Legend
ATP Challenger Tour (0–0)
ITF Futures (0–1)

Result	Date	Category	Tournament	Surface	Opponent	Score
Runner-up	21 April 2012	Futures	Trichy F4, India	Clay	(Croatia) Marin Bradarić	6–4, 3–6, 6–7 ^{(3–6)}

=== Doubles: 7 (2–5) ===
Legend
ATP Challenger Tour (0–0)
ITF Futures (2–5)

Result	Date	Category	Tournament	Surface	Partner	Opponents	Score
Winner	5 June 2010	Futures	Kiseljak F7, Bosnia and Herzegovina	Clay	(Serbia) Miljan Zekić	(Bosnia and Herzegovina) Jasmin Ademović (Bosnia and Herzegovina) Sven Lalić	7–6 ^{(6–4)}, 4–6, [10–8]
Runner–up	26 June 2010	Futures	Belgrade F2, Serbia	Clay	(Serbia) Vladimir Obradović	(Ukraine) Vadim Alekseenko (Ukraine) Aleksandr Nedovyesov	1–6, 3–6
Runner–up	18 June 2011	Futures	Belgrade F1, Serbia	Clay	(Montenegro) Nemanja Kontić	(Serbia) Nikola Čačić (Montenegro) Goran Tošić	0–6, 6–3, [7–10]
Runner–up	17 March 2012	Futures	Antalya – Alibey Manavgat F10, Turkey	Clay	(Serbia) Ivan Bjelica	(Bulgaria) Tihomir Grozdanov (Bulgaria) Dimitar Kuzmanov	3–6, 3–6
Runner–up	1 February 2014	Futures	Sharm El Sheikh F3, Egypt	Clay	(Serbia) Miljan Zekić	(Brazil) José Pereira (Italy) Stefano Travaglia	6–2, 3–6, [8–10]
Winner	20 February 2015	Futures	Colombo F3, Sri Lanka	Clay	(Serbia) Miljan Zekić	(United States) Andre Dome (New Zealand) Ben McLachlan	6–2, 6–4
Runner–up	22 July 2016	Futures	Belgrade F1, Serbia	Clay	(Serbia) Ivan Bjelica	(Serbia) Nebojša Perić (Serbia) Strahinja Rakić	7–5, 2–6, [6–10]
