= 2004 Tennis Masters Cup =

- Date: 13–21 November
- Edition: 35th (singles) / 30th (doubles)
- Category: Masters
- Draw: 8S / 8D
- Prize money: $3,700,000
- Surface: Hard / outdoor
- Location: Houston, Texas, United States
- Venue: Westside Tennis Club

Champions

Singles
- (Switzerland) Roger Federer

Doubles
- (United States) Bob Bryan / (United States) Mike Bryan
- ATP Finals

The 2004 Tennis Masters Cup was a men's tennis tournament played on outdoor hard courts. It was the 35th edition of the year-end singles championships, the 30th edition of the year-end doubles championships, and was part of the 2004 ATP Tour. It took place at the Westside Tennis Club in Houston, Texas, United States, from November 13 through November 21, 2004. Roger Federer won the singles title.

== Finals ==
=== Singles ===
(Switzerland) Roger Federer defeated (Australia) Lleyton Hewitt, 6–3, 6–2

- It was Federer's 11th title of the year, and his 22nd overall. It was his 2nd consecutive year-end championships title.

=== Doubles ===
(United States) Bob Bryan / (United States) Mike Bryan defeated (Zimbabwe) Wayne Black / (Zimbabwe) Kevin Ullyett, 4–6, 7–5, 6–4, 6–2

== Points and prize money ==
Stage	Singles	Doubles^{1}	Points
Champion	RR + $980,000	RR +$125,000	RR + 450
Runner-up	RR + $370,000	RR +$25,000	RR + 200
Round robin win per match	$120,000	$15,000	100
Participation fee	$90,000^{2}	$50,000	–

- RR is points or prize money won in the round robin stage.
- ^{1} Prize money for doubles is per team.
- ^{2} Participation fee for 1 RR match is $45,000 and for 2 RR matches is $70,000.
- An undefeated singles champion would earn the maximum 750 points and $1,520,000 in prize money ($120,000 participation, $360,000 undefeated round robin, $370,000 semifinal win, $700,000 final win)
- An undefeated doubles champion would earn the maximum 750 points and $220,000 in prize money ($50,000 participation, $45,000 undefeated round robin, $25,000 semifinal win, $100,000 final win). While each of them would get 1,500 points, the $220,000 would be split, so $110,000 for each member of the team.

== Points breakdown ==
=== Singles ===
Seed	Rank	Player	Grand Slam				ATP World Tour Masters 1000									Best Other					Total points	Tourn
Seed	Rank	Player	AUS	FRA	WIM	USO	IW	MIA	MC	ROM	HAM	CAN	CIN	MAD	PAR	1	2	3	4	5	Total points	Tourn
1	1	(Switzerland) Roger Federer	W 200	R32; 15	W 200	W 200	W 100	R32; 7	A 0	R32; 7	W 100	W 100	R64; 1	A 0	A 0	W 60	W 45	W 35	W 35	QF; 12	1,117	19
2	2	(United States) Andy Roddick	QF; 50	R64; 7	F 140	QF; 50	QF; 25	W 100	A 0	R64; 1	A 0	F 70	SF; 45	A 0	R16; 15	W 45	W 40	W 35	F 24	F 24	671	22
3	3	(Australia) Lleyton Hewitt	R16; 30	QF; 50	QF; 50	F 140	R32; 7	R32; 7	R16; 15	R32; 7	SF; 45	R16; 15	F 70	A 0	QF; 25	W 50	W 35	W 35	W 35	SF; 22	638	19
4	4	(Russia) Marat Safin	F 140	R16; 30	R128; 1	R128; 1	R32; 7	R64; 1	SF; 45	R16; 15	R16; 15	R64; 1	QF; 25	W 100	W 100	W 35	F 24	SF; 15	QF; 12	R16; 5	572	23
5	5	(Spain) Carlos Moyá	A 0	QF; 50	R16; 30	R32; 15	R64; 1	QF; 25	SF; 45	W 100	QF; 25	R16; 15	QF; 25	A 0	A 0	W 50	W 35	F 24	F 24	QF; 20	484	22
6	6	(Argentina) Guillermo Coria	R128; 7	F 140	R64; 1	A 0	QF; 25	F 70	W 100	A 0	F 70	R64; 1	A 0	A 0	A 0	W 35	F 24	R16; 3	R16; 3	R32; 1	480	19
7	7	(United Kingdom) Tim Henman	R32; 15	SF; 90	QF; 50	SF; 90	F 70	R64; 1	QF; 25	R16; 15	R32; 7	R32; 7	R16; 15	R16; 15	R16; 15	SF; 22	SF; 22	QF; 12	R32; 1	R64; 1	473	19
8	10	(Argentina) Gastón Gaudio	R64; 7	W 200	A 0	R64; 7	R32; 7	R64; 1	R32; 7	R64; 1	R64; 1	R64; 1	R32; 7	A 0	R32; 1	F 42	F 35	F 35	F 24	QF; 8	384	24
Alternates
9	8	(United States) Andre Agassi	SF; 90	R128; 1	A 0	QF; 50	SF; 45	R16; 15	A 0	A 0	A 0	R32; 7	W 100	SF; 45	A 0	F 28	SF; 15	SF; 15	QF; 8	R32; 1	420	19
10	9	(Argentina) David Nalbandian	QF; 50	SF; 90	A 0	R64; 7	A 0	A 0	QF; 25	F 70	R64; 1	R64; 1	A 0	F 70	A 0	F 35	QF; 15	QF; 12	QF; 8	R16; 5	389	19

=== Doubles ===
Rk	Name	1	2	3	4	5	6	7	8	9	10	11	12	13	14	Total	Tour
1	(The Bahamas) Mark Knowles (Canada) Daniel Nestor	W 200	W 100	W 100	SF; 90	W 60	QF; 50	QF; 50	SF; 45	SF; 45	SF; 45	SF; 45	W 35	F 28	QF; 25	918	23
2	(United States) Bob Bryan (United States) Mike Bryan	F 140	SF; 90	F 70	F 70	W 50	W 50	W 50	W 45	SF; 45	SF; 45	W 35	W 35	R16; 30	R16; 30	785	23
3	(Sweden) Jonas Björkman (Australia) Todd Woodbridge	W 200	W 100	SF; 90	F 70	F 70	SF; 45	SF; 45	W 35	R16; 30	R16; 30	QF; 25	R16; 0	R16; 0	R16; 0	740	14
4	(Zimbabwe) Wayne Black (Zimbabwe) Kevin Ullyett	W 100	W 100	F 70	F 70	QF; 50	QF; 50	QF; 50	QF; 50	F 28	QF; 25	SF; 22	QF; 15	QF; 11	QF; 11	652	21
5	(India) Mahesh Bhupathi (Belarus) Max Mirnyi	W 100	SF; 90	QF; 50	SF; 45	SF; 45	SF; 45	R16; 30	R16; 30	SF; 20	QF; 25	R16; 15	R16; 0	R16; 0		495	13
—	(France) Michaël Llodra (France) Fabrice Santoro	W 200	F 140	SF; 45	QF; 25	QF; 25	R32; 15	R16; 0								450	7
6	(Czech Republic) Martin Damm (Czech Republic) Cyril Suk	W 50	W 50	SF; 45	SF; 45	W 35	R16; 30	R16; 30	F 28	QF; 25	QF; 25	QF; 25	SF; 22	SF; 22	R32; 15	447	27
7	(Argentina) Gastón Etlis (Argentina) Martín Rodríguez	SF; 90	F 70	QF; 50	W 35	F 35	QF; 25	QF; 25	F 24	F 24	R32; 15	R16; 15	QF; 12	QF; 8	QF; 8	436	24
15^{1}	(Belgium) Xavier Malisse (Belgium) Olivier Rochus	W 200	R32; 15	R32; 15	R16; 0	R64; 0										230	5

^{1} Malisse and Rochus qualified due to winning French Open and a top 20 finish according to the rules
