= 2004 ATP Masters Series =

Men's professional tennis tour

Details
- Duration: March 10 – November 8
- Edition: 15th
- Tournaments: 9

Achievements (singles)
- Most titles: (Switzerland) Roger Federer (3)
- Most finals: (Argentina) Guillermo Coria (Switzerland) Roger Federer (3)

The table below shows the 2004 ATP Masters Series schedule.

The ATP Masters Series are part of the elite tour for professional men's tennis organised by the Association of Tennis Professionals.

== Results ==
* First-time champion

Masters	Singles champions	Runners-up	Score	Doubles champions	Runners-up	Score
Indian Wells Singles – Doubles	(Switzerland) Roger Federer	(United Kingdom) Tim Henman	6–3, 6–3	(France) Arnaud Clément* (France) Sébastien Grosjean*	(Zimbabwe) Wayne Black (Zimbabwe) Kevin Ullyett	6–3, 4–6, 7–5
Miami Singles – Doubles	(United States) Andy Roddick	(Argentina) Guillermo Coria	6–7^{(2–7)}, 6–3, 6–1 ret.	(Zimbabwe) Wayne Black	(Sweden) Jonas Björkman (Australia) Todd Woodbridge	6–2, 7–6
Miami Singles – Doubles	(United States) Andy Roddick	(Argentina) Guillermo Coria	6–7^{(2–7)}, 6–3, 6–1 ret.	(Zimbabwe) Kevin Ullyett*	(Sweden) Jonas Björkman (Australia) Todd Woodbridge	6–2, 7–6
Monte Carlo Singles – Doubles	(Argentina) Guillermo Coria	(Germany) Rainer Schüttler	6–2, 6–1, 6–3	(United Kingdom) Tim Henman	(Argentina) Gastón Etlis (Argentina) Martín Rodríguez	7–5, 6–4
Monte Carlo Singles – Doubles	(Argentina) Guillermo Coria	(Germany) Rainer Schüttler	6–2, 6–1, 6–3	(Serbia and Montenegro) Nenad Zimonjić*	(Argentina) Gastón Etlis (Argentina) Martín Rodríguez	7–5, 6–4
Rome Singles – Doubles	(Spain) Carlos Moyà	(Argentina) David Nalbandian	6–3, 6–3, 6–1	(India) Mahesh Bhupathi (Belarus) Max Mirnyi	(Australia) Wayne Arthurs (Australia) Paul Hanley	1–6, 6–4, 7–6
Hamburg Singles – Doubles	(Switzerland) Roger Federer	(Argentina) Guillermo Coria	4–6, 6–4, 6–2, 6–3	(Zimbabwe) Wayne Black (Zimbabwe) Kevin Ullyett	(United States) Bob Bryan (United States) Mike Bryan	6–1, 6–2
Toronto Singles – Doubles	(Switzerland) Roger Federer	(United States) Andy Roddick	7–5, 6–3	(India) Mahesh Bhupathi (India) Leander Paes	(Sweden) Jonas Björkman (Belarus) Max Mirnyi	6–4, 6–2
Cincinnati Singles – Doubles	(United States) Andre Agassi	(Australia) Lleyton Hewitt	6–3, 3–6, 6–2	(The Bahamas) Mark Knowles (Canada) Daniel Nestor	(Sweden) Jonas Björkman (Australia) Todd Woodbridge	7–6, 6–3
Madrid Singles – Doubles	(Russia) Marat Safin	(Argentina) David Nalbandian	6–2, 6–4, 6–3	(The Bahamas) Mark Knowles (Canada) Daniel Nestor	(United States) Bob Bryan (United States) Mike Bryan	6–3, 6–4
Paris Singles – Doubles	(Russia) Marat Safin	(Czech Republic) Radek Štěpánek	6–3, 7–6^{(7–5)}, 6–3	(Sweden) Jonas Björkman (Australia) Todd Woodbridge	(Zimbabwe) Wayne Black (Zimbabwe) Kevin Ullyett	6–3, 6–4

== Titles Champions ==
=== Singles ===
#	Player	IN	MI	MO	HA	RO	CA	CI	ST	PA	#	Winning span
1.	(United States) Andre Agassi	1	6	-	-	1	3	3	1	2	17	1990–2004 (15)
2.	(United States) Pete Sampras	2	3	-	-	1	-	3	-	2	11	1992–2000 (9)
3.	(Austria) Thomas Muster	-	1	3	-	3	-	-	1	-	8	1990–1997 (8)
4.	(United States) Michael Chang	3	1	-	-	-	1	2	-	-	7	1990–1997 (8)
5.	(United States) Jim Courier	2	1	-	-	2	-	-	-	-	5	1991–1993 (3)
	(Germany) Boris Becker	-	-	-	-	-	-	-	4	1	5	1990–1996 (7)
	(Brazil) Gustavo Kuerten	-	-	2	1	1	-	1	-	-	5	1999–2001 (3)
	(Chile) Marcelo Ríos	1	1	1	1	1	-	-	-	-	5	1997–1999 (3)
	(Russia) Marat Safin	-	-	-	-	-	1	-	1	3	5	2000–2004 (5)
10.	(Sweden) Stefan Edberg	1	-	-	1	-	-	1	-	1	4	1990–1992 (3)
	(Switzerland) Roger Federer	1	-	-	2	-	1	-	-	-	4	2002–2004 (3)
	(Spain) Juan Carlos Ferrero	-	-	2	-	1	-	1	-	-	4	2001–2003 (3)
	(Ukraine) Andrei Medvedev	-	-	1	3	-	-	-	-	-	4	1994–1997 (4)
14.	(Sweden) Thomas Enqvist	-	-	-	-	-	-	1	1	1	3	1996–2000 (5)
	(Spain) Carlos Moyá	-	-	1	-	1	-	1	-	-	3	1998–2004 (7)
	(United States) Andy Roddick	-	1	-	-	-	1	1	-	-	3	2003–2004 (2)
17.	(Spain) Sergi Bruguera	-	-	2	-	-	-	-	-	-	2	1991–1993 (3)
	(Russia) Andrei Chesnokov	-	-	1	-	-	1	-	-	-	2	1990–1991 (2)
	(Argentina) Guillermo Coria	-	-	1	1	-	-	-	-	-	2	2003–2004 (2)
	(Spain) Àlex Corretja	1	-	-	-	1	-	-	-	-	2	1997–2000 (4)
	(South Africa) Wayne Ferreira	-	-	-	-	-	1	-	1	-	2	1996–2000 (5)
	(France) Guy Forget	-	-	-	-	-	-	1	-	1	2	1991
	(Australia) Lleyton Hewitt	2	-	-	-	-	-	-	-	-	2	2002–2003 (2)
	(Croatia) Goran Ivanišević	-	-	-	-	-	-	-	1	1	2	1992–1993 (2)
	(Netherlands) Richard Krajicek	-	1	-	-	-	-	-	1	-	2	1998–1999 (2)
	(Australia) Patrick Rafter	-	-	-	-	-	1	1	-	-	2	1998
	(Germany) Michael Stich	-	-	-	1	-	-	-	1	-	2	1993
	(Spain) Juan Aguilera	-	-	-	1	-	-	-	-	-	1	1990
	(Argentina) Guillermo Cañas	-	-	-	-	-	1	-	-	-	1	2002
	(Spain) Albert Costa	-	-	-	1	-	-	-	-	-	1	1998
	(Spain) Roberto Carretero	-	-	-	1	-	-	-	-	-	1	1996
	(France) Sébastien Grosjean	-	-	-	-	-	-	-	-	1	1	2001
	(Germany) Tommy Haas	-	-	-	-	-	-	-	1	-	1	2001
	(United Kingdom) Tim Henman	-	-	-	-	-	-	-	-	1	1	2003
	(Sweden) Thomas Johansson	-	-	-	-	-	1	-	-	-	1	1999
	(Czech Republic) Petr Korda	-	-	-	-	-	-	-	1	-	1	1997
	(Spain) Felix Mantilla	-	-	-	-	1	-	-	-	-	1	2003
	(Sweden) Magnus Norman	-	-	-	-	1	-	-	-	-	1	2000
	(Czech Republic) Karel Nováček	-	-	-	1	-	-	-	-	-	1	1991
	(Romania) Andrei Pavel	-	-	-	-	-	1	-	-	-	1	2001
	(Sweden) Mikael Pernfors	-	-	-	-	-	1	-	-	-	1	1993
	(Australia) Mark Philippoussis	1	-	-	-	-	-	-	-	-	1	1999
	(France) Cédric Pioline	-	-	1	-	-	-	-	-	-	1	2000
	(Spain) Albert Portas	-	-	-	-	1	-	-	-	-	1	2001
	(United Kingdom) Greg Rusedski	-	-	-	-	-	-	-	-	1	1	1998
	(Spain) Emilio Sánchez	-	-	-	-	1	-	-	-	-	1	1991
	(United States) Chris Woodruff	-	-	-	-	-	1	-	-	-	1	1997
#	Player	IN	MI	MO	HA	RO	CA	CI	ST	PA	#	Winning span

== See also ==
- ATP Tour Masters 1000
- 2004 ATP Tour
- 2004 WTA Tier I Series
- 2004 WTA Tour
