= 2004 Roger Federer tennis season =

Statistics for Swiss tennis player

- Calendar prize money: $6,357,547

Singles
- Season record: 74–6 (92.50%)
- Calendar titles: 11
- Year-end ranking: No. 1
- Ranking change from previous year: ▲1

Grand Slam & significant results
- Australian Open: W
- French Open: 3R
- Wimbledon: W
- US Open: W
- Other tournaments
- Tour Finals: W
- Olympic Games: 2R

Davis Cup
- Davis Cup: QF

Roger Federer won three Majors in 2004. The first came at the Australian Open over Marat Safin, 7–6(3), 6–4, 6–2. He went on to win his second Wimbledon crown over Andy Roddick, 4–6, 7–5, 7–6(3), 6–4. In addition, Federer defeated the 2001 US Open Champion Lleyton Hewitt at the US Open for his first US Open title, 6–0, 7–6(3), 6–0. Furthermore, Federer won three ATP Masters 1000 events, one on clay at Hamburg, and two on hard court in Indian Wells and Canada. Federer took the ATP 500 series event at Dubai, and wrapped up the year for the second time over Lleyton Hewitt at the Tennis Masters Cup. Federer was the first player to win three Grand Slams in a single season since Mats Wilander in 1988.

Federer became the first man in the Open Era to win at least three majors and the Year-End Championships.

== Year summary ==
In 2004, Federer had one of the most dominating and successful years in the open era of modern men's tennis. He won three of the four Grand Slam singles tournaments, did not lose a match to anyone ranked in the top 10, won every final he reached, and was named the ITF Tennis World Champion. His win–loss record for the year was 74–6 with 11 titles, which included three of the year's four Grand Slams and three ATP Masters Series titles.

=== Early hard court season ===
Federer entered the 2004 Australian Open as the second seed behind American Andy Roddick. In the fourth round he rallied to defeat former number one and native son Lleyton Hewitt after dropping the first set. His nemesis David Nalbandian, who had won five of their six previous meetings, awaited him in the quarterfinals. Federer managed to dispatch the Argentine in four tight sets. The semifinals proved easier as Federer crunched world no. 3 Juan Carlos Ferrero and reached his first Australian Open final. His opponent in the final was former world no. 1 and 2000 US Open champion Marat Safin. After winning the opening set in a tiebreaker Federer secured a 7–6, 6–4, 6–2 championship win. This victory delivered him his first Australian Open and his second career Grand Slam. This win also saw him supplant Roddick as the world no. 1 on 2 February 2004, a ranking he would hold for an all-time record 237 consecutive weeks until 18 August 2008.

Federer's momentum was temporarily halted when he was defeated at the Rotterdam Open by Tim Henman.

Federer quickly rebounded in March, when he won the Dubai Tennis Championships, defeating Marat Safin in the first round and Spanish player Feliciano López in the final.

The next stop on the calendar was the masters tournament in Indian Wells, California. Federer entered Indian Wells looking to claim his first masters title since 2002 Hamburg Masters. Federer had not dropped a set going into the semifinals where he played American legend Andre Agassi. Agassi won the first set, but Federer rallied to win a spot in the finals for the first time in Indian Wells. He seized the opportunity at the 2004 Pacific Life Open, defeating Tim Henman in straight sets to win the title.

2004 also marked the year where he first met teenager and future arch-rival Rafael Nadal, who defeated Federer in their first encounter in Miami.

=== Clay court season ===
Federer skipped Monte Carlo and decided to begin his clay season at the Rome Masters. He was, however, upset in the second round by 2002 French Open champion Albert Costa.

Federer next played the Hamburg Masters. He defeated former number 1 players Carlos Moyá and Lleyton Hewitt in the quarterfinals and semifinals respectively. He then defeated world number 3 Guillermo Coria in the final to claim his second title in Hamburg and end Coria's longest winning streak of 31 consecutive matches on clay.

He entered the French Open as top seed for the first time ever at a Grand Slam, but was defeated in the third round by former world number 1 and three-time French Open champion Gustavo Kuerten.

=== Grass court season ===
Federer entered Halle as the defending champion and quickly solidified his status as the premier grass court player of his generation. He did not drop a set for the entire tournament and convincingly defeated American Mardy Fish in the final by the score of 6–0, 6–3.

After his victory in the grass tuneup at Halle, Federer entered the Wimbledon Championships as the defending champion. Federer was aiming to be the first man to defend his title at Wimbledon since Pete Sampras (1999–2000). The Swiss dropped only one set as he made his way through the tournament and reached the final. He played world number 2 Andy Roddick for the championship in a thrilling four set final. Roddick came out strong with incredible serving and took the first set. The second set began with Federer racing out to a 4–0 lead, but Roddick rallied to level it at 4–4. Federer ultimately broke Roddick in the twelfth game and leveled the match at one set apiece. The pivotal third set was decided by a tiebreaker which was won by the Swiss defending champion. Federer closed out the match in four sets to win his third career Grand Slam.

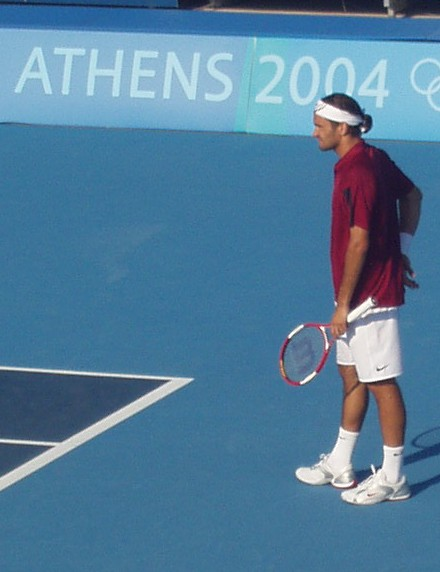
Federer at the 2004 Summer Olympics.

=== Summer hard court season ===
Federer's first tournament after Wimbledon was the Swiss Open at Gstaad. This was a clay court tournament that Federer played because it was a major tournament in his native Switzerland. He had played Gstaad every year between 1998–2003 but had never managed to emerge victorious. That changed in 2004 when Federer defeated Igor Andreev to win a tournament in Switzerland for the first time in his career.

Federer then won the Canada Masters in Toronto where he defeated Andy Roddick in the finals 7–5, 6–3. This was his fourth Masters championship and his first in Canada.

His 23 match winning streak ended surprisingly in the first round of the Cincinnati Masters where Federer was upset by Slovak Dominik Hrbatý.

Federer entered the Athens Olympics as the top-seeded player and was considered the overwhelming favorite, but he was upset in the second round by Czech teenager and future world number 4 Tomáš Berdych. This would be the last loss Federer would suffer for the remainder of his 2004 season.

Federer entered the 2004 US Open as the top seed looking to win his first US Open championship. Federer cruised through the first four rounds before facing Andre Agassi in the quarterfinals. His match against the two time US Open champion proved to be a thrilling five set epic. After splitting the first two sets the third set went to 5–5 before Federer broke and took a two set to one advantage. Agassi would take the fourth but Federer claimed the fifth and decisive set. In the semifinals Federer eased past former nemesis Tim Henman in straight sets. Federer won his first US Open singles title, defeating Lleyton Hewitt, 6–0, 7–6(3), 6–0, in the final. This was one of the most dominant displays in US Open history as Federer was the first player to win two bagel sets in the final since 1884.

=== Fall hard court season ===
Federer began his fall campaign at the Thailand Open. He survived a three set scare against local favorite Paradorn Srichaphan and faced world no. 2 Andy Roddick in the finals. He easily dispatched the American 6–4, 6–0. This was his twelfth consecutive victory in a tournament final which tied the all-time record of Björn Borg and John McEnroe. This victory marked Federer's tenth title of 2004.

Federer skipped the Madrid Masters in order to focus on winning his hometown tournament of the Swiss Indoors in Basel for the first time. However, just before the start of Basel, Federer suffered a muscle fiber rupture in his left thigh and was forced to withdraw. This injury also kept him out of the Paris Masters.

He returned after six weeks out of action at the Tennis Masters Cup in Houston. Federer was honored as the top seed by having lunch with former President George H. W. Bush. He was the defending champion at the Year-End Championships and was placed during the round robin stage in the Red Group. The Red Group consisted of former no. 1 players Carlos Moyá and Lleyton Hewitt as well as reigning French Open champion Gastón Gaudio. He won all three round robin matches, taking six of seven sets, and faced Marat Safin in the semifinals. Federer won the first set, but the second set turned into a historic marathon tiebreaker. The tiebreaker was won by Federer by a score of 20–18 and lasted 27 minutes. The 38 points equalled the longest tie-break in tennis history along with Borg-Lall at 1973 Wimbledon and Ivanisevic-Nestor at 1993 US Open. Federer next faced Lleyton Hewitt in the finals for the sixth time that season and won the championship match 6–3, 6–2. This victory was his thirteenth consecutive victory in a tournament final which broke the record he had shared with Borg and McEnroe.

== Season accomplishments ==
Federer won 11 titles in 2004, which included three Grand Slam titles, three ATP Masters titles, and the Tennis Masters Cup. He was the first player to win three Grand Slam titles in a single year since Mats Wilander in 1988. Federer's win–loss record for the 2004 season was 74–6, which was the best winning percentage of any player since Ivan Lendl was 74–6 in 1986.

In 2016, the ATP named this season as the best in Federer's career. During that year, Federer won 91.6% of his service games, also won 34.8% of his first-serve return points and saved 72.6% of break points against.

== Matches ==
=== Grand Slam performance ===
Tournament	Round	Result	Opponent	Score
Australian Open	1R	Win	(United States) Alex Bogomolov	6–3, 6–4, 6–0
Australian Open	2R	Win	(United States) Jeff Morrison	6–2, 6–3, 6–4
Australian Open	3R	Win	(Australia) Todd Reid	6–3, 6–0, 6–1
Australian Open	4R	Win	(Australia) Lleyton Hewitt	4–6, 6–3, 6–0, 6–4
Australian Open	QF	Win	(Argentina) David Nalbandian	7–5, 6–4, 5–7, 6–3
Australian Open	SF	Win	(Spain) Juan Carlos Ferrero	6–4, 6–1, 6–4
Australian Open	F	Win (2)	(Russia) Marat Safin	7–6^{(7–3)}, 6–4, 6–2
French Open	1R	Win	(Belgium) Kristof Vliegen	6–1, 6–2, 6–1
French Open	2R	Win	(Germany) Nicolas Kiefer	6–3, 6–4, 7–6^{(8–6)}
French Open	3R	Loss	(Brazil) Gustavo Kuerten	4–6, 4–6, 4–6
Wimbledon	1R	Win	(United Kingdom) Alex Bogdanovic	6–3, 6–3, 6–0
Wimbledon	2R	Win	(Colombia) Alejandro Falla	6–1, 6–2, 6–0
Wimbledon	3R	Win	(Sweden) Thomas Johansson	6–3, 6–4, 6–3
Wimbledon	4R	Win	(Croatia) Ivo Karlović	6–3, 7–6^{(7–3)}, 7–6^{(7–5)}
Wimbledon	QF	Win	(Australia) Lleyton Hewitt	6–1, 6–7^{(1–7)}, 6–0, 6–4
Wimbledon	SF	Win	(France) Sébastien Grosjean	6–2, 6–3, 7–6^{(8–6)}
Wimbledon	F	Win (3)	(United States) Andy Roddick	4–6, 7–5, 7–6^{(7–3)}, 6–4
US Open	1R	Win	(Spain) Albert Costa	7–5, 6–2, 6–4
US Open	2R	Win	(Cyprus) Marcos Baghdatis	6–2, 6–7^{(4–7)}, 6–3, 6–1
US Open	3R	Win	(France) Fabrice Santoro	6–0, 6–4, 7–6^{(9–7)}
US Open	4R	Win	(Romania) Andrei Pavel	walkover
US Open	QF	Win	(United States) Andre Agassi	6–3, 2–6, 7–5, 3–6, 6–3
US Open	SF	Win	(United Kingdom) Tim Henman	6–3, 6–4, 6–4
US Open	F	Win (4)	(Australia) Lleyton Hewitt	6–0, 7–6^{(7–3)}, 6–0

==== All matches ====
===== Singles =====
Match	Tournament	Country	Start; Date	Entry	Type	I/O	Surface	Round	Opponent	Result	Score
347	Australian Open	Australia	1/19	DA	GS	Outdoor	Hard	R128	(United States) Alex Bogomolov Jr.	W	6–3, 6–4, 6–0
348	Australian Open	Australia	1/19	DA	GS	Outdoor	Hard	R64	(United States) Jeff Morrison	W	6–2, 6–3, 6–4
349	Australian Open	Australia	1/19	DA	GS	Outdoor	Hard	R32	(Australia) Todd Reid	W	6–3, 6–0, 6–1
350	Australian Open	Australia	1/19	DA	GS	Outdoor	Hard	R16	(Australia) Lleyton Hewitt	W	4–6, 6–3, 6–0, 6–4
351	Australian Open	Australia	1/19	DA	GS	Outdoor	Hard	Q	(Argentina) David Nalbandian	W	7–5, 6–4, 5–7, 6–3
352	Australian Open	Australia	1/19	DA	GS	Outdoor	Hard	S	(Spain) Juan Carlos Ferrero	W	6–4, 6–1, 6–4
353	Australian Open	Australia	1/19	DA	GS	Outdoor	Hard	Win (1)	(Russia) Marat Safin	W	7–6(3), 6–4, 6–2
354	ROM v. SUI WG Rd 1	Romania	2/6	DA	DC	Indoor	Clay	RR	(Romania) Victor Hănescu	W	7–6(4), 6–3, 6–1
355	ROM v. SUI WG Rd 1	Romania	2/6	DA	DC	Indoor	Clay	RR	(Romania) Andrei Pavel	W	6–3, 6–2, 7–5
356	Rotterdam	Netherlands	2/16	DA	500	Indoor	Hard	R32	(France) Arnaud Clément	W	6–4, 6–3
357	Rotterdam	Netherlands	2/16	DA	500	Indoor	Hard	R16	(Romania) Andrei Pavel (2)	W	7–6(2), 7–5
358	Rotterdam	Netherlands	2/16	DA	500	Indoor	Hard	Q	(United Kingdom) Tim Henman	L	3–6, 6–7(9)
359	Dubai	U.A.E.	3/1	DA	500	Outdoor	Hard	R32	(Russia) Marat Safin (2)	W	7–6(2), 7–6(4)
360	Dubai	U.A.E.	3/1	DA	500	Outdoor	Hard	R16	(Spain) Tommy Robredo	W	6–3, 6–4
361	Dubai	U.A.E.	3/1	DA	500	Outdoor	Hard	Q	(Romania) Andrei Pavel (3)	W	6–3, 6–3
362	Dubai	U.A.E.	3/1	DA	500	Outdoor	Hard	S	(Finland) Jarkko Nieminen	W	7–6(7), 6–2
363	Dubai	U.A.E.	3/1	DA	500	Outdoor	Hard	Win (2)	(Spain) Feliciano López	W	4–6, 6–1, 6–2
-	Indian Wells Masters	USA	3/8	DA	1000	Outdoor	Hard	R128	Bye	-	
364	Indian Wells Masters	USA	3/8	DA	1000	Outdoor	Hard	R64	(Romania) Andrei Pavel (4)	W	6–1, 6–1
365	Indian Wells Masters	USA	3/8	DA	1000	Outdoor	Hard	R32	(Chile) Fernando González	W	6–3, 6–2
366	Indian Wells Masters	USA	3/8	DA	1000	Outdoor	Hard	R16	(United States) Mardy Fish	W	6–4, 6–1
367	Indian Wells Masters	USA	3/8	DA	1000	Outdoor	Hard	Q	(Argentina) Juan Ignacio Chela	W	6–2, 6–1
368	Indian Wells Masters	USA	3/8	DA	1000	Outdoor	Hard	S	(United States) Andre Agassi	W	4–6, 6–3, 6–4
369	Indian Wells Masters	USA	3/8	DA	1000	Outdoor	Hard	Win (3)	(United Kingdom) Tim Henman	W	6–3, 6–3
-	Miami Masters	USA	3/22	DA	1000	Outdoor	Hard	R128	Bye	-	
370	Miami Masters	USA	3/22	DA	1000	Outdoor	Hard	R64	(Russia) Nikolay Davydenko	W	6–2, 3–6, 7–5
371	Miami Masters	USA	3/22	DA	1000	Outdoor	Hard	R32	(Spain) Rafael Nadal	L	3–6, 3–6
372	SUI v. FRA WG Qtrs	Switzerland	4/9	DA	DC	Indoor	Hard	RR	(France) Nicolas Escudé	W	6–2, 6–4, 6–4
373	SUI v. FRA WG Qtrs	Switzerland	4/9	DA	DC	Indoor	Hard	RR	(France) Arnaud Clément (2)	W	6–2, 7–5, 6–4
374	Rome Masters	Italy	5/3	DA	1000	Outdoor	Clay	R64	(Sweden) Jonas Björkman	W	7–6(4), 6–3
375	Rome Masters	Italy	5/3	DA	1000	Outdoor	Clay	R32	(Spain) Albert Costa	L	6–3, 3–6, 2–6
376	Hamburg Masters	Germany	5/10	DA	1000	Outdoor	Clay	R64	(Argentina) Gastón Gaudio	W	6–1, 5–7, 6–4
377	Hamburg Masters	Germany	5/10	DA	1000	Outdoor	Clay	R32	(Ecuador) Nicolás Lapentti	W	6–3, 6–3
378	Hamburg Masters	Germany	5/10	DA	1000	Outdoor	Clay	R16	(Chile) Fernando González (2)	W	7–5, 6–1
379	Hamburg Masters	Germany	5/10	DA	1000	Outdoor	Clay	Q	(Spain) Carlos Moyá	W	6–4, 6–3
380	Hamburg Masters	Germany	5/10	DA	1000	Outdoor	Clay	S	(Australia) Lleyton Hewitt (2)	W	6–0, 6–4
381	Hamburg Masters	Germany	5/10	DA	1000	Outdoor	Clay	Win (4)	(Argentina) Guillermo Coria	W	4–6, 6–4, 6–2, 6–3
382	Roland Garros	France	5/24	DA	GS	Outdoor	Clay	R128	(Belgium) Kristof Vliegen	W	6–1, 6–2, 6–1
383	Roland Garros	France	5/24	DA	GS	Outdoor	Clay	R64	(Germany) Nicolas Kiefer	W	6–3, 6–4, 7–6(6)
384	Roland Garros	France	5/24	DA	GS	Outdoor	Clay	R32	(Brazil) Gustavo Kuerten	L	4–6, 4–6, 4–6
385	Halle	Germany	6/7	DA	250	Outdoor	Grass	R32	(Sweden) Thomas Johansson	W	6–3, 6–2
386	Halle	Germany	6/7	DA	250	Outdoor	Grass	R16	(Russia) Mikhail Youzhny	W	6–2, 6–1
387	Halle	Germany	6/7	DA	250	Outdoor	Grass	Q	(France) Arnaud Clément (3)	W	6–3, 7–5
388	Halle	Germany	6/7	DA	250	Outdoor	Grass	S	(Czech Republic) Jiří Novák	W	6–3, 6–4
389	Halle	Germany	6/7	DA	250	Outdoor	Grass	Win (5)	(United States) Mardy Fish (2)	W	6–0, 6–3
390	Wimbledon	England	6/21	DA	GS	Outdoor	Grass	R128	(United Kingdom) Alex Bogdanovic	W	6–3, 6–3, 6–0
391	Wimbledon	England	6/21	DA	GS	Outdoor	Grass	R64	(Colombia) Alejandro Falla	W	6–1, 6–2, 6–0
392	Wimbledon	England	6/21	DA	GS	Outdoor	Grass	R32	(Sweden) Thomas Johansson (2)	W	6–3, 6–4, 6–3
393	Wimbledon	England	6/21	DA	GS	Outdoor	Grass	R16	(Croatia) Ivo Karlović	W	6–3, 7–6(3), 7–6(5)
394	Wimbledon	England	6/21	DA	GS	Outdoor	Grass	Q	(Australia) Lleyton Hewitt (3)	W	6–1, 6–7(1), 6–0, 6–4
395	Wimbledon	England	6/21	DA	GS	Outdoor	Grass	S	(France) Sébastien Grosjean	W	6–2, 6–3, 7–6(6)
396	Wimbledon	England	6/21	DA	GS	Outdoor	Grass	Win (6)	(United States) Andy Roddick	W	4–6, 7–5, 7–6(3), 6–4
397	Gstaad	Switzerland	7/5	DA	250	Outdoor	Clay	R32	(Germany) Tomas Behrend	W	6–1, 6–1
398	Gstaad	Switzerland	7/5	DA	250	Outdoor	Clay	R16	(Croatia) Ivo Karlović (2)	W	6–7(5), 6–3, 7–6(4)
399	Gstaad	Switzerland	7/5	DA	250	Outdoor	Clay	Q	(Czech Republic) Radek Štěpánek	W	6–1, 5–7, 6–4
400	Gstaad	Switzerland	7/5	DA	250	Outdoor	Clay	S	(Italy) Potito Starace	W	6–3, 3–6, 6–3
401	Gstaad	Switzerland	7/5	DA	250	Outdoor	Clay	Win (7)	(Russia) Igor Andreev	W	6–2, 6–3, 5–7, 6–3
402	Canada Masters	Canada	7/26	DA	1000	Outdoor	Hard	R64	(Morocco) Hicham Arazi	W	6–3, 7–5
403	Canada Masters	Canada	7/26	DA	1000	Outdoor	Hard	R32	(Sweden) Robin Söderling	W	7–5, 6–1
404	Canada Masters	Canada	7/26	DA	1000	Outdoor	Hard	R16	(Belarus) Max Mirnyi	W	7–6(3), 7–6(4)
405	Canada Masters	Canada	7/26	DA	1000	Outdoor	Hard	Q	(France) Fabrice Santoro	W	7–5, 6–4
406	Canada Masters	Canada	7/26	DA	1000	Outdoor	Hard	S	(Sweden) Thomas Johansson (3)	W	4–6, 6–3, 6–2
407	Canada Masters	Canada	7/26	DA	1000	Outdoor	Hard	Win (8)	(United States) Andy Roddick (2)	W	7–5, 6–3
408	Cincinnati Masters	USA	8/2	DA	1000	Outdoor	Hard	R64	(Slovakia) Dominik Hrbatý	L	6–1, 6–7(7), 4–6
409	Athens Olympics	Greece	8/16	DA	OL	Outdoor	Hard	R64	(Russia) Nikolay Davydenko (2)	W	6–3, 5–7, 6–1
410	Athens Olympics	Greece	8/16	DA	OL	Outdoor	Hard	R32	(Czech Republic) Tomáš Berdych	L	6–4, 5–7, 5–7
411	US Open	USA	8/30	DA	GS	Outdoor	Hard	R128	(Spain) Albert Costa	W	7–5, 6–2, 6–4
412	US Open	USA	8/30	DA	GS	Outdoor	Hard	R64	(Cyprus) Marcos Baghdatis	W	6–2, 6–7(4), 6–3, 6–1
413	US Open	USA	8/30	DA	GS	Outdoor	Hard	R32	(France) Fabrice Santoro (2)	W	6–0, 6–4, 7–6(7)
-	US Open	USA	8/30	DA	GS	Outdoor	Hard	R16	(Romania) Andrei Pavel (5)	W/O	N/A
414	US Open	USA	8/30	DA	GS	Outdoor	Hard	Q	(United States) Andre Agassi (2)	W	6–3, 2–6, 7–5, 3–6, 6–3
415	US Open	USA	8/30	DA	GS	Outdoor	Hard	S	(United Kingdom) Tim Henman (2)	W	6–3, 6–4, 6–4
416	US Open	USA	8/30	DA	GS	Outdoor	Hard	Win (9)	(Australia) Lleyton Hewitt (4)	W	6–0, 7–6(3), 6–0
417	Bangkok	Thailand	9/27	DA	250	Indoor	Hard	R32	(France) Nicolas Thomann	W	6–4, 7–6(4)
418	Bangkok	Thailand	9/27	DA	250	Indoor	Hard	R16	(Switzerland) Ivo Heuberger	W	6–1, 6–3
419	Bangkok	Thailand	9/27	DA	250	Indoor	Hard	Q	(Sweden) Robin Söderling (2)	W	7–6(3), 6–4
420	Bangkok	Thailand	9/27	DA	250	Indoor	Hard	S	(Thailand) Paradorn Srichaphan	W	7–5, 2–6, 6–3
421	Bangkok	Thailand	9/27	DA	250	Indoor	Hard	Win (10)	(United States) Andy Roddick (3)	W	6–4, 6–0
422	Tennis Masters Cup	USA	11/15	DA	WC	Outdoor	Hard	RR	(Argentina) Gastón Gaudio (2)	W	6–1, 7–6(4)
423	Tennis Masters Cup	USA	11/15	DA	WC	Outdoor	Hard	RR	(Australia) Lleyton Hewitt (5)	W	6–3, 6–4
424	Tennis Masters Cup	USA	11/15	DA	WC	Outdoor	Hard	RR	(Spain) Carlos Moyá (2)	W	6–3, 3–6, 6–3
425	Tennis Masters Cup	USA	11/15	DA	WC	Outdoor	Hard	S	(Russia) Marat Safin (3)	W	6–3, 7–6(18)
426	Tennis Masters Cup	USA	11/15	DA	WC	Outdoor	Hard	Win (11)	(Australia) Lleyton Hewitt (6)	W	6–3, 6–2

== Yearly records ==
=== Finals ===
==== Singles: 11 (11–0) ====
Legend Grand Slam (3–0) ATP World Tour Finals (1–0) ATP World Tour Masters 1000 (3–0) ATP World Tour 500 Series (1–0) ATP World Tour 250 Series (3–0)	Titles by surface Hard (7–0) Clay (2–0) Grass (2–0)	Titles by surface Outdoors (10–0) Indoors (1–0)

Outcome	No.	Date	Tournament	Surface	Opponent	Score
Winner	12.	1 February 2004	Australian Open, Australia	Hard	(Russia) Marat Safin	7–6^{(7–3)}, 6–4, 6–2
Winner	13.	7 March 2004	Dubai Tennis Championships, UAE (2)	Hard	(Spain) Feliciano López	4–6, 6–1, 6–2
Winner	14.	21 March 2004	Indian Wells Masters, United States	Hard	(United Kingdom) Tim Henman	6–3, 6–3
Winner	15.	16 May 2004	Hamburg Masters, Germany (2)	Clay	(Argentina) Guillermo Coria	4–6, 6–4, 6–2, 6–3
Winner	16.	13 June 2004	Halle Open, Germany (2)	Grass	(United States) Mardy Fish	6–0, 6–3
Winner	17.	4 July 2004	Wimbledon, England, UK (2)	Grass	(United States) Andy Roddick	4–6, 7–5, 7–6^{(7–3)}, 6–4
Winner	18.	11 July 2004	Swiss Open, Switzerland	Clay	(Russia) Igor Andreev	6–2, 6–3, 5–7, 6–3
Winner	19.	1 August 2004	Canada Open, Canada	Hard	(United States) Andy Roddick	7–5, 6–3
Winner	20.	12 September 2004	US Open, United States	Hard	(Australia) Lleyton Hewitt	6–0, 7–6^{(7–3)}, 6–0
Winner	21.	3 October 2004	Thailand Open, Thailand	Hard (i)	(United States) Andy Roddick	6–4, 6–0
Winner	22.	21 November 2004	Year-End Championships, USA (2)	Hard	(Australia) Lleyton Hewitt	6–3, 6–2

== Prize money earnings ==
Event	Prize money	Year-to-date
Australian Open	$915,960	$915,960
Australian Open (doubles)	$3,587	$919,547
ABN AMRO World Tennis Tournament	$23,740	$943,287
Dubai Duty Free Tennis Championships	$187,500	$1,130,787
Pacific Life Open	$421,600	$1,552,387
Pacific Life Open (doubles)	$3,675	$1,556,062
NASDAQ-100 Open	$19,730	$1,575,792
Internazionali BNL d'Italia	$15,000	$1,590,792
Internazionali BNL d'Italia (doubles)	$3,800	$1,594,592
Hamburg Masters	$400,000	$1,994,592
French Open	$42,313	$2,036,905
Gerry Weber Open	$113,000	$2,149,905
Gerry Weber Open (doubles)	$1,000	$2,150,905
The Championships, Wimbledon	$1,107,817	$3,258,722
Allianz Suisse Open Gstaad	$76,500	$3,335,222
Rogers AT&T Cup	$410,500	$3,745,722
Western & Southern Financial Group Masters	$7,500	$3,753,222
US Open	$1,000,000	$4,753,222
Thailand Open	$76,500	$4,829,722
Thailand Open (doubles)	$7,825	$4,837,547
Tennis Masters Cup	$1,520,000	$6,357,547
		$6,357,547

== See also ==
- Roger Federer
- Roger Federer career statistics
