= 2004 WTA Tier I Series =

Women's professional tennis tour

Details
- Duration: February 2 – October 24
- Edition: 15th
- Tournaments: 10

Achievements (singles)
- Most titles: (France) Amélie Mauresmo (3)
- Most finals: (United States) Lindsay Davenport (France) Amélie Mauresmo (3)

The WTA Tier I events are part of the elite tour for professional women's tennis organised by the WTA called the WTA Tour.

== Tournaments ==
Tournament	Country	Location	Surface	Date	Prize money
Toray Pan Pacific Open	Japan	Tokyo	Carpet (i)	Feb 2 – 8	$1,300,000
Pacific Life Open	United States	Indian Wells	Hard	Mar 8–21	$2,100,000
NASDAQ-100 Open	United States	Key Biscayne	Hard	Mar 22 – Apr 4	$3,060,000
Family Circle Cup	United States	Charleston	Clay (green)	Apr 12 – 18	$1,300,000
Qatar Total German Open	Germany	Berlin	Clay (red)	May 3 – 9	$1,300,000
Internazionali BNL d'Italia	Italy	Rome	Clay (red)	May 10 – 16	$1,300,000
Acura Classic	United States	San Diego	Hard	Jul 26 – Aug 1	$1,300,000
Rogers AT&T Cup	Canada	Montreal	Hard	Aug 2–8	$1,300,000
Kremlin Cup	Russia	Moscow	Carpet (i)	Oct 11–17	$1,300,000
Swisscom Challenge	Switzerland	Zürich	Hard (i)	Oct 18–24	$1,300,000

== Results ==
* First-time champion

Tournament	Singles champions	Runners-up	Score	Doubles champions	Runners-up	Score
Tokyo Singles – Doubles	(United States) Lindsay Davenport	(Bulgaria) Magdalena Maleeva	6–4, 6–1	(Zimbabwe) Cara Black (Australia) Rennae Stubbs	(Russia) Elena Likhovtseva (Bulgaria) Magdalena Maleeva	6–0, 6–1
Indian Wells Singles – Doubles	(Belgium) Justine Henin	(United States) Lindsay Davenport	6–1, 6–4	(Spain) Virginia Ruano Pascual (Argentina) Paola Suárez	(Russia) Svetlana Kuznetsova (Russia) Elena Likhovtseva	6–1, 6–2
Miami Singles – Doubles	(United States) Serena Williams	(Russia) Elena Dementieva	6–1, 6–1	(Russia) Nadia Petrova (United States) Meghann Shaughnessy	(Russia) Svetlana Kuznetsova (Russia) Elena Likhovtseva	6–2, 6–3
Charleston Singles – Doubles	(United States) Venus Williams	(Spain) Conchita Martínez	2–6, 6–2, 6–1	(Spain) Virginia Ruano Pascual (2) (Argentina) Paola Suárez (2)	(United States) Martina Navratilova (United States) Lisa Raymond	6–4, 6–1
Berlin Singles – Doubles	(France) Amélie Mauresmo	(United States) Venus Williams	Walkover	(Russia) Nadia Petrova (2) (United States) Meghann Shaughnessy (2)	(Slovakia) Janette Husárová (Spain) Conchita Martínez	6–2, 2–6, 6–1
Rome Singles – Doubles	(France) Amélie Mauresmo (2)	(United States) Jennifer Capriati	3–6, 6–3, 7–6^{(8–6)}	(Russia) Nadia Petrova (3) (United States) Meghann Shaughnessy (3)	(Spain) Virginia Ruano Pascual (Argentina) Paola Suárez	2–6, 6–3, 6–3
San Diego Singles – Doubles	(United States) Lindsay Davenport (2)	(Russia) Anastasia Myskina	6–1, 6–1	(Zimbabwe) Cara Black (2) (Australia) Rennae Stubbs (2)	(Spain) Virginia Ruano Pascual (Argentina) Paola Suárez	4–6, 6–1, 6–4
Montréal Singles – Doubles	(France) Amélie Mauresmo (3)	(Russia) Elena Likhovtseva	6–1, 6–0	(Japan) Shinobu Asagoe*	(South Africa) Liezel Huber (Thailand) Tamarine Tanasugarn	6–0, 6–3
Montréal Singles – Doubles	(France) Amélie Mauresmo (3)	(Russia) Elena Likhovtseva	6–1, 6–0	(Japan) Ai Sugiyama	(South Africa) Liezel Huber (Thailand) Tamarine Tanasugarn	6–0, 6–3
Moscow Singles – Doubles	(Russia) Anastasia Myskina	(Russia) Elena Dementieva	7–5, 6–0	(Russia) Anastasia Myskina* (Russia) Vera Zvonareva*	(Spain) Virginia Ruano Pascual (Argentina) Paola Suárez	6–3, 4–6, 6–2
Zürich Singles – Doubles	(Australia) Alicia Molik*	(Russia) Maria Sharapova	4–6, 6–2, 6–3	(Zimbabwe) Cara Black (3) (Australia) Rennae Stubbs (3)	(Spain) Virginia Ruano Pascual (Argentina) Paola Suárez	6–4, 6–4

== See also ==
- WTA Tier I events
- 2004 WTA Tour
- 2004 ATP Masters Series
- 2004 ATP Tour
