= 2004 Davidoff Swiss Indoors – Doubles =

Doubles
- 2004 Davidoff Swiss Indoors

Final
- Champions: (United States) Bob Bryan (United States) Mike Bryan
- Runners-up: (Argentina) Lucas Arnold (Argentina) Mariano Hood
- Score: 7–6^{(11–9)}, 6–2

Details
- Draw: 16
- Seeds: 4

Events
Singles	Doubles
← 2003 ·	Swiss Indoors	· 2005 →

Mark Knowles and Daniel Nestor were the defending champions, but lost in the semifinals this year.

Bob Bryan and Mike Bryan won in the final 7–6^{(11–9)}, 6–2, against Lucas Arnold and Mariano Hood.

== Seeds ==
1. (The Bahamas) Mark Knowles / (Canada) Daniel Nestor (semifinals)
2. (United States) Bob Bryan / (United States) Mike Bryan (champions)
3. (Zimbabwe) Wayne Black / (Zimbabwe) Kevin Ullyett (quarterfinals)
4. (Argentina) Gastón Etlis / (Argentina) Martín Rodríguez (quarterfinals)

== Draw ==
=== Key ===
- Q = Qualifier
- WC = Wild card
- LL = Lucky loser
- Alt = Alternate
- SE = Special exempt
- PR = Protected ranking
- ITF = ITF entry
- JE = Junior exempt
- w/o = Walkover
- r = Retired
- d = Defaulted
- SR = Special ranking

=== Draw ===
First round
1	(The Bahamas) M Knowles (Canada) D Nestor	7^{7}	6
WC	(Switzerland) G Bastl (Switzerland) J-C Scherrer	6^{5}	4
(Czech Republic) J Novák (United States) V Spadea	6	6
(South Africa) C Haggard (Czech Republic) P Pála	2	4
3	(Zimbabwe) W Black (Zimbabwe) K Ullyett	5
(Argentina) JI Chela (Peru) L Horna	0^{r}
(Argentina) L Arnold (Argentina) M Hood	6	6
(Germany) F Mayer (Netherlands) R Wassen	1	2
(Croatia) M Ančić (Croatia) I Ljubičić	6	7^{7}
(Chile) F González (Chile) N Massú	3	6^{4}
(Czech Republic) M Damm (Czech Republic) C Suk	4	6^{3}
4	(Argentina) G Etlis (Argentina) M Rodríguez	6	7^{7}
WC	(Switzerland) M Chiudinelli (Switzerland) M Kratochvil	6	3	7
Alt	(Spain) Á López Morón (Spain) R Nadal	4	6	6^{4}
(Argentina) G Gaudio (Argentina) M Zabaleta	1	4
2	(United States) B Bryan (United States) M Bryan	6	6

Quarterfinals
1	(The Bahamas) M Knowles (Canada) D Nestor	6	6
(Czech Republic) J Novák (United States) V Spadea	3	2
3	(Zimbabwe) W Black (Zimbabwe) K Ullyett	6	6^{5}	2
(Argentina) L Arnold (Argentina) M Hood	3	7^{7}	6
(Croatia) M Ančić (Croatia) I Ljubičić	2	6	6
4	(Argentina) G Etlis (Argentina) M Rodríguez	6	1	4
WC	(Switzerland) M Chiudinelli (Switzerland) M Kratochvil	0	2
2	(United States) B Bryan (United States) M Bryan	6	6

Semifinals
1	(The Bahamas) M Knowles (Canada) D Nestor	5	6^{4}
(Argentina) L Arnold (Argentina) M Hood	7	7^{7}
(Croatia) M Ančić (Croatia) I Ljubičić	6^{3}	7^{7}	3
2	(United States) B Bryan (United States) M Bryan	7^{7}	6^{5}	6

Final
(Argentina) L Arnold (Argentina) M Hood	6^{9}	2
2	(United States) B Bryan (United States) M Bryan	7^{11}	6
