= 2004 BA-CA-TennisTrophy – Singles =

Singles
- 2004 BA-CA-TennisTrophy

Final
- Champion: (Spain) Feliciano López
- Runner-up: (Argentina) Guillermo Cañas
- Score: 6–4, 1–6, 7–5, 3–6, 7–5

Details
- Draw: 32
- Seeds: 8

Events
Singles	Doubles
← 2003 ·	Vienna Open	· 2005 →

Roger Federer was the defending champion, but did not participate this year.

Feliciano López won the title, defeating Guillermo Cañas 6–4, 1–6, 7–5, 3–6, 7–5 in the final.

== Seeds ==
1. (Argentina) David Nalbandian (quarterfinals)
2. (Chile) Nicolás Massú (quarterfinals)
3. (Germany) Rainer Schüttler (quarterfinals)
4. (Argentina) Juan Ignacio Chela (first round)
5. (Thailand) Paradorn Srichaphan (second round)
6. (Argentina) Guillermo Cañas (final)
7. (Czech Republic) ~~Jiří Novák~~ (withdrew because of a rib injury)
8. (Spain) Feliciano López (champion)

== Draw ==
=== Key ===
- Q = Qualifier
- WC = Wild card
- LL = Lucky loser
- Alt = Alternate
- SE = Special exempt
- PR = Protected ranking
- ITF = ITF entry
- JE = Junior exempt
- w/o = Walkover
- r = Retired
- d = Defaulted
- SR = Special ranking

=== Finals ===
Semifinals
6	(Argentina) Guillermo Cañas	6	6
(Germany) Tommy Haas	4	3
8	(Spain) Feliciano López	6	6
(Italy) Davide Sanguinetti	3	3

Final
6	(Argentina) Guillermo Cañas	4	6	5	6	5
8	(Spain) Feliciano López	6	1	7	3	7

=== Top half ===
First round
1	(Argentina) D Nalbandian	6	6
Q	(Italy) A Seppi	4	3
(Austria) S Koubek	7	6
(Spain) A Martín	5	1
(United States) T Dent	6	6
WC	(Austria) K Gruber	1	3
WC	(Austria) J Knowle	2	4
6	(Argentina) G Cañas	6	6
4	(Argentina) JI Chela	4	4
(Germany) F Mayer	6	6
Q	(South Africa) W Moodie	3	0
(Germany) T Haas	6	6
(United States) R Ginepri	4	7^{7}	6
(Italy) P Starace	6	6^{4}	4
(Spain) A Costa	4	4
5	(Thailand) P Srichaphan	6	6

Second round
1	(Argentina) D Nalbandian	6	7^{8}
(Austria) S Koubek	2	6^{6}
(United States) T Dent	4	4
6	(Argentina) G Cañas	6	6
(Germany) F Mayer	3	4
(Germany) T Haas	6	6
(United States) R Ginepri	6	6
5	(Thailand) P Srichaphan	2	1

Quarterfinals
1	(Argentina) D Nalbandian	4	6	3
6	(Argentina) G Cañas	6	2	6
(Germany) T Haas	4	6	6
(United States) R Ginepri	6	3	4

Semifinals
6	(Argentina) G Cañas	6	6
(Germany) T Haas	4	3

=== Bottom half ===
First round
8	(Spain) F López	1	7	6
(Argentina) A Calleri	6	5	3
(Sweden) T Enqvist	6	4	4
SE	(Czech Republic) B Ulihrach	3	6	6
(Peru) L Horna	6	6
(Spain) D Ferrer	3	2
(Austria) J Melzer	4	6	3
3	(Germany) R Schüttler	6	1	6
LL	(United States) G Weiner	3	6	2
WC	(Austria) A Peya	6	3	6
(Italy) D Sanguinetti	7^{9}	7
(Argentina) M Zabaleta	6^{7}	5
Q	(South Africa) R de Voest	6	6
(Serbia and Montenegro) J Tipsarević	3	4
Q	(Slovakia) K Kučera	4	7^{7}	4
2	(Chile) N Massú	6	6^{5}	6

Second round
8	(Spain) F López	6	6
SE	(Czech Republic) B Ulihrach	1	4
(Peru) L Horna	5	6	3
3	(Germany) R Schüttler	7	4	6
WC	(Austria) A Peya	5	4
(Italy) D Sanguinetti	7	6
Q	(South Africa) R de Voest	4	2
2	(Chile) N Massú	6	6

Quarterfinals
8	(Spain) F López	6	6
3	(Germany) R Schüttler	4	4
(Italy) D Sanguinetti	6	6
2	(Chile) N Massú	4	3

Semifinals
8	(Spain) F López	6	6
(Italy) D Sanguinetti	3	3
