= 2004 Canada Masters – Doubles =

Doubles
- 2004 Canada Masters

Final
- Champions: (India) Mahesh Bhupathi (India) Leander Paes
- Runners-up: (Sweden) Jonas Björkman (Belarus) Max Mirnyi
- Score: 6–4, 6–2

Details
- Draw: 24
- Seeds: 8

Events
Singles	Doubles
- Canada Masters

The 2004 Canada Masters doubles was an event of the one hundred and fifteenth edition of the Canada Masters; a WTA Tier I tournament and the most prestigious men's tennis tournament held in Canada. Mahesh Bhupathi and Max Mirnyi were the defending champions. They were both present but did not compete together. Mirnyi partnered with Jonas Björkman, but Bhupathi and partner Leander Paes defeated them 6–4, 6–2, in the final.

== Seeds ==
All seeds receive a bye into the second round.

1. (United States) Bob Bryan / (United States) Mike Bryan (second round)
2. (Sweden) Jonas Björkman / (Belarus) Max Mirnyi (final)
3. (France) Michaël Llodra / (France) Fabrice Santoro (semifinals)
4. (The Bahamas) Mark Knowles / (Canada) Daniel Nestor (semifinals)
5. (Australia) Wayne Arthurs / (Australia) Paul Hanley (second round)
6. (Zimbabwe) Wayne Black / (Zimbabwe) Kevin Ullyett (second round)
7. (Czech Republic) Martin Damm / (Czech Republic) Cyril Suk (second round)
8. (India) Mahesh Bhupathi / (India) Leander Paes (champions)

== Draw ==
Key

- Q = Qualifier
- WC = Wild card
- LL = Lucky loser
- Alt = Alternate
- ITF = ITF entry
- PR = Protected ranking
- SR = Special ranking
- SE = Special exempt
- JE = Junior exempt
- JR = Junior Accelerator Programme entrant
- CO = College Accelerator Programme entrant
- NG = Next Gen Accelerator Program entrant
- w/o = Walkover
- r = Retired
- d = Defaulted

=== Finals ===
Semifinals
8	(India) Mahesh Bhupathi (India) Leander Paes	6	6
4	(The Bahamas) Mark Knowles (Canada) Daniel Nestor	4	4
3	(France) Michaël Llodra (France) Fabrice Santoro	6^{2}	6^{2}
2	(Sweden) Jonas Björkman (Belarus) Max Mirnyi	7	7

Final
8	(India) Mahesh Bhupathi (India) Leander Paes	6	6
2	(Sweden) Jonas Björkman (Belarus) Max Mirnyi	4	2

=== Top half ===
First round
(United States) J Palmer (Czech Republic) P Vízner	6	6
WC	(Canada) S Larose (Canada) F Niemeyer	4	2
(Belgium) X Malisse (Armenia) S Sargsian	4	5
(Argentina) G Etlis (Argentina) M Rodríguez	6	7
(Czech Republic) P Pála (Czech Republic) D Rikl	6	7
(Argentina) JI Chela (Argentina) G Gaudio	2	6^{5}
(Argentina) D Nalbandian (Russia) M Safin	6	1	2
(Israel) J Erlich (Israel) A Ram	4	6	6

Second round
1	(United States) B Bryan (United States) M Bryan	1	4
(United States) J Palmer (Czech Republic) P Vízner	6	6
(Argentina) G Etlis (Argentina) M Rodríguez	3	2
8	(India) M Bhupathi (India) L Paes	6	6
4	(The Bahamas) M Knowles (Canada) D Nestor	6	6
(Czech Republic) P Pála (Czech Republic) D Rikl	3	2
(Israel) J Erlich (Israel) A Ram	4	6	6
7	(Czech Republic) M Damm (Czech Republic) C Suk	6	3	4

Quarterfinals
(United States) J Palmer (Czech Republic) P Vízner	6	6^{5}	3
8	(India) M Bhupathi (India) L Paes	2	7	6
4	(The Bahamas) M Knowles (Canada) D Nestor	6	3	6
(Israel) J Erlich (Israel) A Ram	4	6	3

Semifinals
8	(India) M Bhupathi (India) L Paes	6	6
4	(The Bahamas) M Knowles (Canada) D Nestor	4	4

=== Bottom half ===
First round
(France) S Grosjean (Slovakia) D Hrbatý	6	6
ALT	(Spain) F López (Spain) F Verdasco	1	4
WC	(Canada) F Dancevic (Czech Republic) J Novák	4	2
(Chile) F González (Chile) N Massú	6	6
(South Africa) C Haggard (Australia) T Perry	w/o
(Germany) N Kiefer (Germany) R Schüttler
(Czech Republic) F Čermák (Czech Republic) L Friedl	6^{2}	4
(Austria) J Knowle (Serbia and Montenegro) N Zimonjić	7	6

Second round
5	(Australia) W Arthurs (Australia) P Hanley	3	4
(France) S Grosjean (Slovakia) D Hrbatý	6	6
(Chile) F González (Chile) N Massú	7	6^{5}	4
3	(France) M Llodra (France) F Santoro	5	7	6
6	(Zimbabwe) W Black (Zimbabwe) K Ullyett	6^{2}	2
(South Africa) C Haggard (Australia) T Perry	7	6
(Austria) J Knowle (Serbia and Montenegro) N Zimonjić	5	2
2	(Sweden) J Björkman (Belarus) M Mirnyi	7	6

Quarterfinals
(France) S Grosjean (Slovakia) D Hrbatý	2	5
3	(France) M Llodra (France) F Santoro	6	7
(South Africa) C Haggard (Australia) T Perry	3	4
2	(Sweden) J Björkman (Belarus) M Mirnyi	6	6

Semifinals
3	(France) M Llodra (France) F Santoro	6^{2}	6^{2}
2	(Sweden) J Björkman (Belarus) M Mirnyi	7	7
