= 2004 Qatar Open – Doubles =

Doubles
- 2004 Qatar Open

Final
- Champions: (Czech Republic) Martin Damm (Czech Republic) Cyril Suk
- Runners-up: (Austria) Stefan Koubek (United States) Andy Roddick
- Score: 6–2, 6–4

Details
- Draw: 16
- Seeds: 4

Events
Singles	Doubles
- ATP Qatar Open

Martin Damm and Cyril Suk were the defending champions and won in the final 6–2, 6–4 against Stefan Koubek and Andy Roddick.

== Seeds ==
1. (Sweden) Jonas Björkman / (Australia) Todd Woodbridge (first round)
2. (The Bahamas) Mark Knowles / (Canada) Daniel Nestor (semifinals)
3. (Czech Republic) Martin Damm / (Czech Republic) Cyril Suk (champions)
4. (United States) Jared Palmer / (Czech Republic) Pavel Vízner (first round)

== Draw ==
Key

- Q = Qualifier
- WC = Wild card
- LL = Lucky loser
- Alt = Alternate
- ITF = ITF entry
- PR = Protected ranking
- SR = Special ranking
- SE = Special exempt
- JE = Junior exempt
- JR = Junior Accelerator Programme entrant
- CO = College Accelerator Programme entrant
- NG = Next Gen Accelerator Program entrant
- w/o = Walkover
- r = Retired
- d = Defaulted

First round
1	(Sweden) J Björkman (Australia) T Woodbridge	7^{7}	2	4
(Czech Republic) F Čermák (Czech Republic) L Friedl	6^{3}	6	6
(France) N Escudé (France) S Grosjean	7	6
(Croatia) I Ljubičić (Italy) F Volandri	5	4
4	(United States) J Palmer (Czech Republic) P Vízner	4	6	3
(Argentina) A Calleri (France) G Carraz	6	1	6
WC	(Austria) S Koubek (United States) A Roddick	5
(Morocco) H Arazi (Morocco) Y El Aynaoui	2^{r}
(Germany) R Schüttler (Russia) M Youzhny	2	1
(Armenia) S Sargsian (Serbia and Montenegro) N Zimonjić	6	6
(Czech Republic) T Cibulec (Czech Republic) R Štěpánek	4	4
3	(Czech Republic) M Damm (Czech Republic) C Suk	6	6
(Argentina) J I Chela (Chile) N Massú	6	4	2
WC	(United States) J-M Gambill (United States) T Parrott	4	6	6
(South Africa) J Coetzee (South Africa) C Haggard	1	1
2	(The Bahamas) M Knowles (Canada) D Nestor	6	6

Quarterfinals
(Czech Republic) F Čermák (Czech Republic) L Friedl	6	2	3
(France) N Escudé (France) S Grosjean	4	6	6
(Argentina) A Calleri (France) G Carraz	6^{6}	5
WC	(Austria) S Koubek (United States) A Roddick	7^{8}	7
(Armenia) S Sargsian (Serbia and Montenegro) N Zimonjić	5	2
3	(Czech Republic) M Damm (Czech Republic) C Suk	7	6
WC	(United States) J-M Gambill (United States) T Parrott	2	4
2	(The Bahamas) M Knowles (Canada) D Nestor	6	6

Semifinals
(France) N Escudé (France) S Grosjean	6	3	4
WC	(Austria) S Koubek (United States) A Roddick	2	6	6
3	(Czech Republic) M Damm (Czech Republic) C Suk	6	7
2	(The Bahamas) M Knowles (Canada) D Nestor	1	5

Final
WC	(Austria) S Koubek (United States) A Roddick	2	4
3	(Czech Republic) M Damm (Czech Republic) C Suk	6	6
