= 2004 BA-CA-TennisTrophy – Doubles =

Doubles
- 2004 BA-CA-TennisTrophy

Final
- Champions: (Czech Republic) Martin Damm (Czech Republic) Cyril Suk
- Runners-up: (Argentina) Gastón Etlis (Argentina) Martín Rodríguez
- Score: 6–7^{(4–7)}, 6–4, 7–6^{(7–4)}

Details
- Draw: 16
- Seeds: 4

Events
Singles	Doubles
← 2003 ·	Vienna Open	· 2005 →

Yves Allegro and Roger Federer were the defending champions, but did not participate this year.

Martin Damm and Cyril Suk won the title, defeating Gastón Etlis and Martín Rodríguez 6–7^{(4–7)}, 6–4, 7–6^{(7–4)} in the final.

== Seeds ==
1. (The Bahamas) Mark Knowles / (Canada) Daniel Nestor (semifinals)
2. (India) Leander Paes / (Czech Republic) David Rikl (quarterfinals)
3. (Argentina) Gastón Etlis / (Argentina) Martín Rodríguez (final)
4. (Austria) Julian Knowle / (Serbia and Montenegro) Nenad Zimonjić (first round)

== Draw ==
=== Key ===
- Q = Qualifier
- WC = Wild card
- LL = Lucky loser
- Alt = Alternate
- SE = Special exempt
- PR = Protected ranking
- ITF = ITF entry
- JE = Junior exempt
- w/o = Walkover
- r = Retired
- d = Defaulted
- SR = Special ranking

=== Draw ===
First round
1	(The Bahamas) M Knowles (Canada) D Nestor	6	6
Alt	(South Africa) R de Voest (South Africa) W Moodie	2	3
(South Africa) C Haggard (Australia) P Hanley	6	4	6
(Argentina) L Arnold (Argentina) M Hood	4	6	4
3	(Argentina) G Etlis (Argentina) M Rodríguez	7	7
WC	(Germany) T Haas (Austria) S Koubek	5	5
(Spain) A Costa (Spain) F López	7^{8}	7^{7}
(Argentina) G Cañas (Argentina) JI Chela	6^{6}	6^{3}
(Germany) F Mayer (Netherlands) R Wassen	4	1
WC	(Austria) J Melzer (Austria) A Peya	6	6
(Peru) L Horna (Chile) N Massú	7^{7}	6
4	(Austria) J Knowle (Serbia and Montenegro) N Zimonjić	6^{3}	4
(United States) J Palmer (Czech Republic) P Vízner	5	7^{7}	4
(Czech Republic) M Damm (Czech Republic) C Suk	7	6^{4}	6
(United States) T Dent (United States) R Ginepri	4	3
2	(India) L Paes (Czech Republic) D Rikl	6	6

Quarterfinals
1	(The Bahamas) M Knowles (Canada) D Nestor	6	7
(South Africa) C Haggard (Australia) P Hanley	4	5
3	(Argentina) G Etlis (Argentina) M Rodríguez	6	4	7^{7}
(Spain) A Costa (Spain) F López	2	6	6^{3}
WC	(Austria) J Melzer (Austria) A Peya
(Peru) L Horna (Chile) N Massú	w/o
(Czech Republic) M Damm (Czech Republic) C Suk	7	4	6
2	(India) L Paes (Czech Republic) D Rikl	5	6	3

Semifinals
1	(The Bahamas) M Knowles (Canada) D Nestor	4	5
3	(Argentina) G Etlis (Argentina) M Rodríguez	6	7
(Peru) L Horna (Chile) N Massú
(Czech Republic) M Damm (Czech Republic) C Suk	w/o

Final
3	(Argentina) G Etlis (Argentina) M Rodríguez	7^{7}	4	6^{4}
(Czech Republic) M Damm (Czech Republic) C Suk	6^{4}	6	7^{7}
