= 2004 Open 13 – Doubles =

Doubles
- 2004 Open 13

Final
- Champions: (The Bahamas) Mark Knowles (Canada) Daniel Nestor
- Runners-up: (Czech Republic) Martin Damm (Czech Republic) Cyril Suk
- Score: 7–5, 6–3

Events
Singles	Doubles
← 2003 ·	Open 13	· 2005 →

Sébastien Grosjean and Fabrice Santoro were the defending champions but did not compete that year.

Mark Knowles and Daniel Nestor won in the final 7–5, 6–3 against Martin Damm and Cyril Suk.

== Seeds ==
1. (The Bahamas) Mark Knowles / (Canada) Daniel Nestor (champions)
2. (Czech Republic) Martin Damm / (Czech Republic) Cyril Suk (final)
3. (Australia) Paul Hanley / (Serbia and Montenegro) Nenad Zimonjić (semifinals)
4. (United States) Jared Palmer / (Czech Republic) Pavel Vízner (semifinals)

== Draw ==
=== Key ===
- Q = Qualifier
- WC = Wild card
- LL = Lucky loser
- Alt = Alternate
- SE = Special exempt
- PR = Protected ranking
- ITF = ITF entry
- JE = Junior exempt
- w/o = Walkover
- r = Retired
- d = Defaulted
- SR = Special ranking

First round
1	(The Bahamas) M Knowles (Canada) D Nestor	6	7^{8}
(Slovakia) D Hrbatý (Slovakia) K Kučera	3	6^{6}
WC	(France) J-F Bachelot (France) S de Chaunac	7^{7}	7^{9}
(Spain) A Martín (Belgium) C Rochus	6^{1}	6^{7}
4	(United States) J Palmer (Czech Republic) P Vízner	7	6
(Finland) J Nieminen (Romania) A Pavel	5	4
(Czech Republic) T Cibulec (Czech Republic) P Pála	6	6^{2}	2
(Austria) J Knowle (Belgium) T Vanhoudt	4	7^{7}	6
(Chile) F González (Thailand) P Srichaphan	1	2
(France) N Escudé (Russia) M Safin	6	6
ALT	(France) D Guez (France) J Hilaire	3	1
3	(Australia) P Hanley (Serbia and Montenegro) N Zimonjić	6	6
(Israel) J Erlich (Israel) A Ram	6	7^{7}
(France) G Carraz (France) A Clément	3	6^{5}
WC	(France) J Benneteau (France) N Mahut	4	7^{12}	3
2	(Czech Republic) M Damm (Czech Republic) C Suk	6	6^{10}	6

Quarterfinals
1	(The Bahamas) M Knowles (Canada) D Nestor	6	7^{7}
WC	(France) J-F Bachelot (France) S de Chaunac	4	6^{3}
4	(United States) J Palmer (Czech Republic) P Vízner	4	7	6
(Austria) J Knowle (Belgium) T Vanhoudt	6	5	3
(France) N Escudé (Russia) M Safin
3	(Australia) P Hanley (Serbia and Montenegro) N Zimonjić	w/o
(Israel) J Erlich (Israel) A Ram	7^{7}	6^{5}	6^{2}
2	(Czech Republic) M Damm (Czech Republic) C Suk	6^{2}	7^{7}	7^{7}

Semifinals
1	(The Bahamas) M Knowles (Canada) D Nestor	4	6	6
4	(United States) J Palmer (Czech Republic) P Vízner	6	3	4
3	(Australia) P Hanley (Serbia and Montenegro) N Zimonjić	4	3
2	(Czech Republic) M Damm (Czech Republic) C Suk	6	6

Final
1	(The Bahamas) M Knowles (Canada) D Nestor	7	6
2	(Czech Republic) M Damm (Czech Republic) C Suk	5	3
