= 2005 Davidoff Swiss Indoors – Singles =

Singles
- 2005 Davidoff Swiss Indoors

Final
- Champion: (Chile) Fernando González
- Runner-up: (Cyprus) Marcos Baghdatis
- Score: 6–7^{(8–10)}, 6–3, 7–5, 6–4

Details
- Draw: 32 (4 Q / 3 WC )
- Seeds: 8

Events
Singles	Doubles
← 2004 ·	Swiss Indoors	· 2006 →

Jiří Novák was the defending champion, but lost in the second round to Paradorn Srichaphan.

Fernando González won in the final 6–7^{(8–10)}, 6–3, 7–5, 6–4, against Marcos Baghdatis.

== Seeds ==
1. (Argentina) Guillermo Coria (second round)
2. (Argentina) David Nalbandian (semifinals)
3. (Spain) Juan Carlos Ferrero (second round)
4. (Chile) Fernando González (champion)
5. (Slovakia) Dominik Hrbatý (semifinals)
6. (United Kingdom) Tim Henman (first round)
7. (Czech Republic) Jiří Novák (second round)
8. (Germany) Tommy Haas (second round)

== Draw ==
=== Key ===
- Q = Qualifier
- WC = Wild card
- LL = Lucky loser
- Alt = Alternate
- SE = Special exempt
- PR = Protected ranking
- ITF = ITF entry
- JE = Junior exempt
- w/o = Walkover
- r = Retired
- d = Defaulted
- SR = Special ranking

=== Finals ===
Semifinals
5	(Slovakia) Dominik Hrbatý	0	3
4	(Chile) Fernando González	6	6
Q	(Cyprus) Marcos Baghdatis	6	7^{7}
2	(Argentina) David Nalbandian	2	6^{3}

Final
4	(Chile) Fernando González	6^{8}	6	7	6
Q	(Cyprus) Marcos Baghdatis	7^{10}	3	5	4

=== Top half ===
First round
1	(Argentina) G Coria	6	6
(Spain) A Martín	2	4
Q	(Belgium) K Vliegen	7^{7}	4	6
(Switzerland) S Wawrinka	6^{4}	6	3
(Argentina) A Calleri	6	6
(Romania) R Sabău	0	3
(Argentina) JI Chela	6^{7}	2
5	(Slovakia) D Hrbatý	7^{9}	6
4	(Chile) F González	7^{7}	6
(Italy) A Seppi	6^{3}	3
(Czech Republic) T Zíb	3	5
LL	(Germany) M Berrer	6	7
(Czech Republic) T Berdych	5	6	6
WC	(Switzerland) G Bastl	7	4	2
WC	(United Kingdom) A Murray	6	5	7^{7}
6	(United Kingdom) T Henman	2	7	6^{4}

Second round
1	(Argentina) G Coria	6^{0}	5
Q	(Belgium) K Vliegen	7^{7}	7
(Argentina) A Calleri	6	3	2
5	(Slovakia) D Hrbatý	3	6	6
4	(Chile) F González	6	7
LL	(Germany) M Berrer	4	5
(Czech Republic) T Berdych	4	6	4
WC	(United Kingdom) A Murray	6	2	6

Quarterfinals
Q	(Belgium) K Vliegen	7^{11}	1	3
5	(Slovakia) D Hrbatý	6^{9}	6	6
4	(Chile) F González	6	3	6
WC	(United Kingdom) A Murray	4	6	1

Semifinals
5	(Slovakia) D Hrbatý	0	3
4	(Chile) F González	6	6

=== Bottom half ===
First round
8	(Germany) T Haas	7^{7}	6
Q	(Germany) A Waske	6^{5}	4
Q	(Cyprus) M Baghdatis	6	6
LL	(United Kingdom) A Mackin	1	3
(Argentina) J Acasuso	4	7^{7}	6
(Chile) N Massú	6	6^{3}	4
(Italy) F Volandri	2	4
3	(Spain) JC Ferrero	6	6
7	(Czech Republic) J Novák	7^{7}	7^{7}
WC	(Switzerland) M Lammer	6^{4}	6^{5}
(Thailand) P Srichaphan	6	6
(Belgium) C Rochus	3	2
Q	(South Africa) W Moodie	6^{1}	6	3
(Germany) F Mayer	7^{7}	1	6
(Croatia) I Karlović	3	6^{4}
2	(Argentina) D Nalbandian	6	7^{7}

Second round
8	(Germany) T Haas	2	3
Q	(Cyprus) M Baghdatis	6	6
(Argentina) J Acasuso	6	6^{7}	6
3	(Spain) JC Ferrero	3	7^{9}	3
7	(Czech Republic) J Novák	3	2
(Thailand) P Srichaphan	6	6
(Germany) F Mayer	3	2
2	(Argentina) D Nalbandian	6	6

Quarterfinals
Q	(Cyprus) M Baghdatis	6^{2}	7^{7}	6
(Argentina) J Acasuso	7^{7}	6^{5}	3
(Thailand) P Srichaphan	2	2
2	(Argentina) D Nalbandian	6	6

Semifinals
Q	(Cyprus) M Baghdatis	6	7^{7}
2	(Argentina) D Nalbandian	2	6^{3}
