= 2004 Mutua Madrileña Masters Madrid =

- Date: 18–25 October
- Edition: 3rd
- Category: ATP Masters Series
- Draw: 48S / 16D
- Prize money: $2,200,000
- Surface: Hard / indoor
- Location: Madrid, Spain
- Venue: Madrid Arena

Champions

Singles
- (Russia) Marat Safin

Doubles
- (The Bahamas) Mark Knowles / (Canada) Daniel Nestor
← 2003 ·	Madrid Open	· 2005 →

The 2004 Madrid Masters (also known as the Mutua Madrileña Masters Madrid for sponsorship reasons) was a tennis tournament played on indoor hard courts. It was the 3rd edition of the Madrid Masters, and was part of the ATP Masters Series of the 2004 ATP Tour. It took place at the Madrid Arena in Madrid, Spain, from 18 October through 25 October 2004. Third-seeded Marat Safin won the singles title.

In the absence of world number one Roger Federer, the singles field was led by ATP no. 5, French Open and US Open semi-finalist, Wimbledon quarterfinalist and Indian Wells finalist Tim Henman, Cincinnati titlist, 2002 Madrid Masters winner, 2003 Masters Cup winner and eight-time grand slam champion Andre Agassi and Australian Open runner-up, Beijing titlist and Estoril finalist Marat Safin. Other top seeds were Rome Masters runner-up, 2002 Wimbledon Championships titlist David Nalbandian, Olympics gold medalist, Kitzbühel winner Nicolás Massú, Juan Carlos Ferrero, Joachim Johansson and Tommy Robredo.

== Finals ==
=== Singles ===
(Russia) Marat Safin defeated (Argentina) David Nalbandian 6–2, 6–4, 6–3

- It was Marat Safin's 2nd title of the year and his 13th overall. It was his 1st Masters Series title of the year and his 4th overall.

=== Doubles ===
(The Bahamas) Mark Knowles / (Canada) Daniel Nestor defeated (United States) Bob Bryan / (United States) Mike Bryan 6–3, 6–4
