= 2005 Davidoff Swiss Indoors =

- Date: 24–30 October
- Edition: 36th
- Category: International Series
- Draw: 32S / 16D
- Prize money: $975,000
- Location: Basel, Switzerland
- Venue: St. Jakobshalle

Champions

Singles
- (Chile) Fernando González

Doubles
- (Argentina) Agustín Calleri / (Chile) Fernando González
← 2004 ·	Swiss Indoors	· 2006 →

The 2005 Davidoff Swiss Indoors was a men's tennis tournament played on indoor carpet courts. It was the 36th edition of the event known that year as the Davidoff Swiss Indoors, and was part of the International Series of the 2005 ATP Tour. It took place at the St. Jakobshalle in Basel, Switzerland, from 24 October through 30 October 2005.

The singles line up included ATP No. 7, US Open quarterfinalist, Rome and Monte Carlo Masters runner-up, Umag champion Guillermo Coria, Australian Open, Wimbledon, US Open quarterfinalist, Munich titlist David Nalbandian, and former World No. 1, Barcelona, Vienna finalist Juan Carlos Ferrero. Also seeded were Auckland, Amersfoort winner Fernando González, Australian Open quarterfinalist Dominik Hrbatý, Tim Henman, Jiří Novák and Tommy Haas.

== Finals ==
=== Singles ===
(Chile) Fernando González defeated (Cyprus) Marcos Baghdatis, 6–7^{(8–10)}, 6–3, 7–5, 6–4

- It was Fernando González's 3rd title of the year, and his 7th overall.

=== Doubles ===
(Argentina) Agustín Calleri / (Chile) Fernando González defeated (Australia) Stephen Huss / (South Africa) Wesley Moodie, 7–5, 7–5
