= 2004 Davidoff Swiss Indoors – Singles =

Singles
- 2004 Davidoff Swiss Indoors

Final
- Champion: (Czech Republic) Jiří Novák
- Runner-up: (Argentina) David Nalbandian
- Score: 5–7, 6–3, 6–4, 1–6, 6–2

Details
- Draw: 32 (4 Q / 3 WC )
- Seeds: 8

Events
| Singles | Doubles |
| ← 2003 · | Swiss Indoors | · 2005 → |

Guillermo Coria was the defending champion, but did not participate this year.

Jiří Novák won the tournament, beating David Nalbandian in the final, 5–7, 6–3, 6–4, 1–6, 6–2.

== Seeds ==
1. ~~(Switzerland) Roger Federer~~ (withdrew due to a thigh strain)
2. (United Kingdom) Tim Henman (quarterfinals)
3. (Argentina) Gastón Gaudio (second round)
4. (Argentina) David Nalbandian (final)
5. (Spain) Tommy Robredo (second round, withdrew)
6. (Germany) Rainer Schüttler (quarterfinals)
7. (Chile) Nicolás Massú (semifinals)
8. (Chile) Fernando González (first round)

== Draw ==
=== Key ===
- Q = Qualifier
- WC = Wild card
- LL = Lucky loser
- Alt = Alternate
- SE = Special exempt
- PR = Protected ranking
- ITF = ITF entry
- JE = Junior exempt
- w/o = Walkover
- r = Retired
- d = Defaulted
- SR = Special ranking

=== Finals ===
Semifinals
7 | (Chile) Nicolás Massú | 3 | 4
4 | (Argentina) David Nalbandian | 6 | 6
(Austria) Stefan Koubek | 4 | 0
(Czech Republic) Jiří Novák | 6 | 6

Final
4 | (Argentina) David Nalbandian | 7 | 3 | 4 | 6 | 2
(Czech Republic) Jiří Novák | 5 | 6 | 6 | 1 | 6

=== Top half ===
First round
LL | (Czech Republic) B Ulihrach | 6
(Peru) L Horna | 1 | r
(United States) T Dent | 2 | 3
WC | (Switzerland) I Heuberger | 6 | 6
(Romania) V Hănescu | 6^{7} | 7 | 6^{4}
(Argentina) M Zabaleta | 7^{9} | 5 | 7^{7}
Q | (Switzerland) M Kratochvil | 3 | 2
7 | (Chile) N Massú | 6 | 6
4 | (Argentina) D Nalbandian | 6 | 6
(Croatia) M Ančić | 4 | 3
(Italy) F Volandri | 3 | 0^{r}
(United States) V Spadea | 6 | 4
(Spain) A Montañés | 3 | 3
WC | (Switzerland) M Chiudinelli | 6 | 6
(Spain) R Nadal | 3 | 4
6 | (Germany) R Schüttler | 6 | 6

Second round
LL | (Czech Republic) B Ulihrach | 6 | 6
(Switzerland) I Heuberger | 1 | 4
(Argentina) M Zabaleta | 2 | 4
7 | (Chile) N Massú | 6 | 6
4 | (Argentina) D Nalbandian | 6 | 6
(United States) V Spadea | 4 | 4
WC | (Switzerland) M Chiudinelli | 6^{4} | 2
6 | (Germany) R Schüttler | 7^{7} | 6

Quarterfinals
LL | (Czech Republic) B Ulihrach | 2 | 6^{4}
7 | (Chile) N Massú | 6 | 7^{7}
4 | (Argentina) D Nalbandian | 4 | 7^{7} | 6
6 | (Germany) R Schüttler | 6 | 6^{5} | 3

Semifinals
7 | (Chile) N Massú | 3 | 4
4 | (Argentina) D Nalbandian | 6 | 6

=== Bottom half ===
First round
8 | (Chile) F González | 3 | 4
Q | (France) J Haehnel | 6 | 6
(Argentina) JI Chela | 3 | 4
(Croatia) I Ljubičić | 6 | 6
(Thailand) P Srichaphan | 7^{9} | 4 | 3
(Austria) S Koubek | 6^{7} | 6 | 6
Q | (Belgium) D Norman | 6^{4} | 4
3 | (Argentina) G Gaudio | 7^{7} | 6
5 | (Spain) T Robredo | 7^{8} | 5 | 6
WC | (Switzerland) S Wawrinka | 6^{6} | 7 | 4
(Czech Republic) J Novák | 6 | 6
(Germany) F Mayer | 2 | 3
(Italy) P Starace | 4 | 4
Q | (South Africa) W Moodie | 6 | 6
(France) A Dupuis | 3 | 4
2 | (United Kingdom) T Henman | 6 | 6

Second round
Q | (France) J Haehnel | 3 | 6 | 3
(Croatia) I Ljubičić | 6 | 3 | 6
(Austria) S Koubek | 6 | 1 | 6
3 | (Argentina) G Gaudio | 1 | 6 | 3
5 | (Spain) T Robredo
(Czech Republic) J Novák | w/o
Q | (South Africa) W Moodie | 6^{2} | 7^{7} | 4
2 | (United Kingdom) T Henman | 7^{7} | 6^{0} | 6

Quarterfinals
(Croatia) I Ljubičić | 6 | 5 | 5
(Austria) S Koubek | 2 | 7 | 7
(Czech Republic) J Novák | 7^{7} | 7
2 | (United Kingdom) T Henman | 6^{5} | 5

Semifinals
(Austria) S Koubek | 4 | 0
(Czech Republic) J Novák | 6 | 6
