= Konstantin Gruber =

Austrian tennis player

- Full name: Konstantin Gruber-Zamarripa
- Country (sports): Austria
- Born: 27 October 1979 (age 45); Vienna, Austria
- Height: 6 ft 0 in (183 cm)
- Plays: Right-handed
- Prize money: $41,782

Singles
- Career record: 1–1 (ATP Tour & Davis Cup)
- Highest ranking: No. 397 (28 Nov 2005)

Doubles
- Highest ranking: No. 582 (25 Oct 1999)

Konstantin Gruber-Zamarripa (born 27 October 1979) is an Austrian former professional tennis player.

Gruber, a native of Vienna, turned professional in 1999 and reached a career high singles ranking of 397 during his career. He made a Davis Cup appearance in 2003, when he beat Norway's Stian Boretti in Oslo to give Austria a 5–0 sweep of the tie. In 2004 he featured in the main draw of an ATP Tour tournament for the only time, at the 2004 BA-CA-TennisTrophy in Vienna, where he was beaten in the first round by Taylor Dent.

== ITF Futures titles ==
=== Singles: (3) ===
No.	Date	Tournament	Surface	Opponent	Score
1.	Jul 1999	Austria F2, Telfs	Clay	(Austria) Thomas Strengberger	6–4, 6–4
2.	Aug 1999	Romania F2, Bacău	Clay	(France) Fabrice Betencourt	7–5, 6–2
3.	Aug 2003	Croatia F5, Zagreb	Clay	(Croatia) Vjekoslav Skenderović	3–6, 7–6^{(5)}, 6–4

=== Doubles: (1) ===
No.	Date	Tournament	Surface	Partner	Opponents	Score
1.	Sep 2003	Slovakia F1, Žilina	Clay	(Austria) Marko Neunteibl	(Czech Republic) Ladislav Chramosta (Czech Republic) David Novak	7–6^{(3)}, 6–1

== See also ==
- List of Austria Davis Cup team representatives
