= 2004 BNP Paribas Masters – Doubles =

Doubles
- 2004 BNP Paribas Masters

Final
- Champions: (Sweden) Jonas Björkman (Australia) Todd Woodbridge
- Runners-up: (Zimbabwe) Wayne Black (Zimbabwe) Kevin Ullyett
- Score: 6–3, 6–4

Details
- Draw: 16
- Seeds: 4

Events
Singles	Doubles
← 2003 ·	BNP Paribas Masters	· 2005 →

Wayne Arthurs and Paul Hanley were the defending champions, but lost in the first round this year.

Jonas Björkman and Todd Woodbridge won in the final 6–3, 6–4, against Wayne Black and Kevin Ullyett.

== Seeds ==
1. (The Bahamas) Mark Knowles / (Canada) Daniel Nestor (quarterfinals)
2. (United States) Bob Bryan / (United States) Mike Bryan (first round)
3. (Sweden) Jonas Björkman / (Australia) Todd Woodbridge (champions)
4. (India) Mahesh Bhupathi / (Belarus) Max Mirnyi (semifinals)

== Draw ==
=== Key ===
- Q = Qualifier
- WC = Wild card
- LL = Lucky loser
- Alt = Alternate
- SE = Special exempt
- PR = Protected ranking
- ITF = ITF entry
- JE = Junior exempt
- w/o = Walkover
- r = Retired
- d = Defaulted
- SR = Special ranking

=== Draw ===
First round
1	(The Bahamas) M Knowles (Canada) D Nestor	6	6
(Argentina) G Gaudio (Argentina) M Hood	3	4
(Zimbabwe) W Black (Zimbabwe) K Ullyett	6^{5}	6	6
Alt	(United States) J Palmer (Czech Republic) P Vízner	7^{7}	2	3
4	(India) M Bhupathi (Belarus) M Mirnyi	7	7^{7}
(Romania) A Pavel (Serbia and Montenegro) N Zimonjić	5	6^{3}
WC	(France) A Clément (France) M Llodra	6	5	3
(Chile) F González (Chile) N Massú	1	7	6
(India) L Paes (Czech Republic) D Rikl	3	2
(Czech Republic) M Damm (Czech Republic) C Suk	6	6
(Australia) W Arthurs (Australia) P Hanley	3	4
3	(Sweden) J Björkman (Australia) T Woodbridge	6	6
(Argentina) G Etlis (Argentina) M Rodríguez	6	3	2
(Slovakia) D Hrbatý (Czech Republic) J Novák	3	6	6
WC	(France) J Benneteau (France) N Mahut	7^{10}	7^{7}
2	(United States) B Bryan (United States) M Bryan	6^{8}	6^{5}

Quarterfinals
1	(The Bahamas) M Knowles (Canada) D Nestor	4	4
(Zimbabwe) W Black (Zimbabwe) K Ullyett	6	6
4	(India) M Bhupathi (Belarus) M Mirnyi	w/o
(Chile) F González (Chile) N Massú
(Czech Republic) M Damm (Czech Republic) C Suk	2	r
3	(Sweden) J Björkman (Australia) T Woodbridge	6
(Slovakia) D Hrbatý (Czech Republic) J Novák	1	6^{4}
WC	(France) J Benneteau (France) N Mahut	6	7^{7}

Semifinals
(Zimbabwe) W Black (Zimbabwe) K Ullyett	6	6
4	(India) M Bhupathi (Belarus) M Mirnyi	3	4
3	(Sweden) J Björkman (Australia) T Woodbridge	4	6	6
WC	(France) J Benneteau (France) N Mahut	6	3	2

Final
(Zimbabwe) W Black (Zimbabwe) K Ullyett	3	4
3	(Sweden) J Björkman (Australia) T Woodbridge	6	6
