= 2004 Open 13 – Singles =

Singles
- 2004 Open 13

Final
- Champion: (Slovakia) Dominik Hrbatý
- Runner-up: (Sweden) Robin Söderling
- Score: 4–6, 6–4, 6–4

Details
- Draw: 32 (4 Q / 3 WC )
- Seeds: 8

Events
Singles	Doubles
← 2003 ·	Open 13	· 2005 →

Roger Federer was the defending champion but did not compete that year.

Dominik Hrbatý won in the final 4–6, 6–4, 6–4 against Robin Söderling.

== Seeds ==
1. (Spain) Juan Carlos Ferrero (first round)
2. (Argentina) Guillermo Coria (second round)
3. (Thailand) Paradorn Srichaphan (first round)
4. (Belarus) Max Mirnyi (quarterfinals)
5. (Chile) Fernando González (quarterfinals)
6. (Spain) Albert Costa (second round)
7. (France) Arnaud Clément (semifinals)
8. (Russia) Marat Safin (second round)

== Draw ==
=== Key ===
- Q = Qualifier
- WC = Wild card
- LL = Lucky loser
- Alt = Alternate
- SE = Special exempt
- PR = Protected ranking
- ITF = ITF entry
- JE = Junior exempt
- w/o = Walkover
- r = Retired
- d = Defaulted
- SR = Special ranking

=== Finals ===
Semifinals
(Sweden) Robin Söderling	6	6
7	(France) Arnaud Clément	3	3
(Slovakia) Dominik Hrbatý	7^{11}	6
(Sweden) Jonas Björkman	6^{9}	3

Final
(Sweden) Robin Söderling	6	4	4
(Slovakia) Dominik Hrbatý	4	6	6

=== Top half ===
First round
1	(Spain) J C Ferrero	6^{2}	7^{7}	3
(France) G Carraz	7^{7}	6^{3}	6
SE	(Sweden) T Enqvist	6^{4}	6^{1}
(Sweden) R Söderling	7^{7}	7^{7}
(Finland) J Nieminen	4	6	7^{7}
(France) N Escudé	6	4	6^{2}
(Slovakia) K Kučera	6	6^{5}	r
5	(Chile) F González	4	7^{7}
3	(Thailand) P Srichaphan	6	3	2
(Spain) A Martín	1	6	6
(Armenia) S Sargsian	7	7^{7}
(France) F Santoro	5	6^{4}
(Belgium) O Rochus	3	7^{7}	6
(Slovakia) K Beck	6	6^{5}	1
(Croatia) G Ivanišević	2	7^{7}	4
7	(France) A Clément	6	6^{4}	6

Second round
(France) G Carraz	3	4
(Sweden) R Söderling	6	6
(Finland) J Nieminen	2	3
5	(Chile) F González	6	6
(Spain) A Martín	6	6
(Armenia) S Sargsian	3	3
(Belgium) O Rochus	6^{8}	6^{1}
7	(France) A Clément	7^{10}	7^{7}

Quarterfinals
(Sweden) R Söderling	7^{7}	6
5	(Chile) F González	6^{5}	3
(Spain) A Martín	3	2
7	(France) A Clément	6	6

Semifinals
(Sweden) R Söderling	6	6
7	(France) A Clément	3	3

=== Bottom half ===
First round
6	(Spain) A Costa	7^{8}	7^{7}
(Morocco) H Arazi	6^{6}	6^{2}
(Slovakia) D Hrbatý	6	7
Q	(France) N Mahut	3	5
WC	(France) C Saulnier	6	6
Q	(Austria) J Knowle	1	3
(Romania) A Pavel	6	6^{5}	2
4	(Belarus) M Mirnyi	4	7^{7}	6
WC/8	(Russia) M Safin	6	6
Q	(Germany) F Mayer	3	4
(Sweden) J Björkman	7	6
(Netherlands) R Sluiter	5	3
(Italy) D Sanguinetti	1	6^{4}
Q	(Switzerland) M Rosset	6	7^{7}
(Russia) N Davydenko	6^{2}	3
WC/2	(Argentina) G Coria	7^{7}	6

Second round
6	(Spain) A Costa	5	6	6^{5}
(Slovakia) D Hrbatý	7	4	7^{7}
WC	(France) C Saulnier	4	4
4	(Belarus) M Mirnyi	6	6
WC/8	(Russia) M Safin	6^{5}	5
(Sweden) J Björkman	7^{7}	7
Q	(Switzerland) M Rosset	7^{7}	6
WC/2	(Argentina) G Coria	6^{2}	1

Quarterfinals
(Slovakia) D Hrbatý	6	7^{12}
4	(Belarus) M Mirnyi	3	6^{10}
(Sweden) J Björkman	7	6
Q	(Switzerland) M Rosset	5	3

Semifinals
(Slovakia) D Hrbatý	7^{11}	6
(Sweden) J Björkman	6^{9}	3
