= 2004 Qatar Open – Singles =

Singles
- 2004 Qatar Open

Final
- Champion: (France) Nicolas Escudé
- Runner-up: (Croatia) Ivan Ljubičić
- Score: 6–3, 7–6^{(7–4)}

Details
- Draw: 32
- Seeds: 8

Events
Singles	Doubles
- ATP Qatar Open

Stefan Koubek was the defending champion but lost in the second round to Hyung-Taik Lee.

Nicolas Escudé won in the final 6–3, 7–6^{(7–4)} against Ivan Ljubičić.

== Seeds ==
1. (United States) Andy Roddick (second round)
2. (Germany) Rainer Schüttler (first round)
3. (Australia) Mark Philippoussis (first round)
4. (France) Sébastien Grosjean (quarterfinals)
5. (Chile) Nicolás Massú (first round)
6. (Morocco) Younes El Aynaoui (first round)
7. (United Kingdom) Tim Henman (semifinals)
8. (Argentina) Agustín Calleri (semifinals)

== Draw ==
Key

- Q = Qualifier
- WC = Wild card
- LL = Lucky loser
- Alt = Alternate
- ITF = ITF entry
- PR = Protected ranking
- SR = Special ranking
- SE = Special exempt
- JE = Junior exempt
- JR = Junior Accelerator Programme entrant
- CO = College Accelerator Programme entrant
- NG = Next Gen Accelerator Program entrant
- w/o = Walkover
- r = Retired
- d = Defaulted

=== Finals ===
Semifinals
8	(Argentina) Agustín Calleri	2	3
WC	(France) Nicolas Escudé	6	6
(Croatia) Ivan Ljubičić	7^{7}	3	7^{7}
7	(United Kingdom) Tim Henman	6^{2}	6	6^{5}

Final
WC	(France) Nicolas Escudé	6	7^{7}
(Croatia) Ivan Ljubičić	3	6^{4}

=== Top half ===
First round
1	(United States) A Roddick	6	6
(Russia) N Davydenko	3	4
(Czech Republic) R Štěpánek	3	0^{r}
(Sweden) J Björkman	6	3
(Morocco) H Arazi	7^{7}	2	6
WC	(Sweden) T Enqvist	6^{1}	6	3
(Italy) F Volandri	4	6	4
8	(Argentina) A Calleri	6	4	6
3	(Australia) M Philippoussis	6	1	4
(Austria) S Koubek	3	6	6
(South Korea) H-T Lee	1
Q	(Belarus) V Voltchkov	2^{r}
Q	(Switzerland) I Heuberger	6	6
WC	(Qatar) S Khalfan	2	2
WC	(France) N Escudé	6	6
6	(Morocco) Y El Aynaoui	3	0

Second round
1	(United States) A Roddick	3	4
(Sweden) J Björkman	6	6
(Morocco) H Arazi	6	4	5
8	(Argentina) A Calleri	4	6	7
(Austria) S Koubek	4	4
(South Korea) H-T Lee	6	6
Q	(Switzerland) I Heuberger	3	2
WC	(France) N Escudé	6	6

Quarterfinals
(Sweden) J Björkman	4	4
8	(Argentina) A Calleri	6	6
(South Korea) H-T Lee	4	2
WC	(France) N Escudé	6	6

Semifinals
8	(Argentina) A Calleri	2	3
WC	(France) N Escudé	6	6

=== Bottom half ===
First round
5	(Chile) N Massú	3	3
(Croatia) I Ljubičić	6	6
(Sweden) R Söderling	6^{7}	6	6
(United States) J-M Gambill	7^{9}	3	3
(Germany) N Kiefer	2	1
Q	(Czech Republic) B Ulihrach	6	6
Q	(Germany) M Hantschk	1	5
4	(France) S Grosjean	6	7
7	(United Kingdom) T Henman	6	6
(Spain) D Sánchez	4	0
(Argentina) J I Chela	6	3	7
(Belgium) O Rochus	1	6	5
(France) G Carraz	6	0	3
(Armenia) S Sargsian	3	6	6
(Russia) M Youzhny	6	7^{7}
2	(Germany) R Schüttler	3	6^{5}

Second round
(Croatia) I Ljubičić	6	6
(Sweden) R Söderling	2	4
Q	(Czech Republic) B Ulihrach	1	4
4	(France) S Grosjean	6	6
7	(United Kingdom) T Henman	6	6
(Argentina) J I Chela	3	4
(Armenia) S Sargsian	3	6	6
(Russia) M Youzhny	6	3	2

Quarterfinals
(Croatia) I Ljubičić	6	5	6
4	(France) S Grosjean	3	7	4
7	(United Kingdom) T Henman	6	6
(Armenia) S Sargsian	3	1

Semifinals
(Croatia) I Ljubičić	7^{7}	3	7^{7}
7	(United Kingdom) T Henman	6^{2}	6	6^{5}
