= 2004 BA-CA-TennisTrophy =

- Date: 11–17 October
- Edition: 30th
- Category: International Series Gold
- Draw: 32S / 16D
- Prize money: $658,000
- Surface: Hard / indoor
- Location: Vienna, Austria
- Venue: Wiener Stadthalle

Champions

Singles
- (Spain) Feliciano López

Doubles
- (Czech Republic) Martin Damm / (Czech Republic) Cyril Suk
← 2003 ·	Vienna Open	· 2005 →

The 2004 BA-CA-TennisTrophy was a tennis tournament played on indoor hard courts. It was the 30th edition of the event known that year as the BA-CA-TennisTrophy, and was part of the International Series Gold of the 2004 ATP Tour. It took place at the Wiener Stadthalle in Vienna, Austria, from 11 October through 17 October 2004.

== Finals ==
=== Singles ===
(Spain) Feliciano López defeated (Argentina) Guillermo Cañas 6–4, 1–6, 7–5, 3–6, 7–5

=== Doubles ===
(Czech Republic) Martin Damm / (Czech Republic) Cyril Suk defeated (Argentina) Gastón Etlis / (Argentina) Martín Rodríguez 6–7^{(4–7)}, 6–4, 7–6^{(7–4)}
