= 2004 BNP Paribas Masters =

- Date: 1–8 November
- Edition: 32nd
- Category: ATP Masters Series
- Draw: 48S / 16D
- Prize money: $2,200,000
- Surface: Carpet / indoor
- Location: Paris, France
- Venue: Palais omnisports de Paris-Bercy

Champions

Singles
- (Russia) Marat Safin

Doubles
- (Sweden) Jonas Björkman / (Australia) Todd Woodbridge
- Paris Masters

The 2004 Paris Masters (also known as the BNP Paribas Masters for sponsorship reasons) was a men's tennis tournament held at the Palais omnisports de Paris-Bercy in Paris, France and played on indoor carpet courts. It was the 32nd edition of the Paris Masters, and was part of the 2004 ATP Masters Series. The tournament was held from 1 November to 8 November 2004. Russia's Marat Safin defeated Czech Radek Štěpánek in the final to win the singles title, his third at the event after 2000 and 2002.

== Finals ==
=== Singles ===
(Russia) Marat Safin defeated (Czech Republic) Radek Štěpánek, 6–3, 7–6, 6–3

=== Doubles ===
(Sweden) Jonas Björkman / (Australia) Todd Woodbridge defeated (Zimbabwe) Wayne Black / (Zimbabwe) Kevin Ullyett, 6–3, 6–4
