= 2004 Pacific Life Open – Women's doubles =

Women's doubles
- 2004 Pacific Life Open

Final
- Champions: (Spain) Virginia Ruano Pascual (Argentina) Paola Suárez
- Runners-up: (Russia) Svetlana Kuznetsova (Russia) Elena Likhovtseva
- Score: 6–1, 6–2

Details
- Draw: 32 (3 WC / 1 Q)
- Seeds: 8

Events
Singles	men	women
Doubles	men	women
← 2003 ·	Indian Wells Masters	· 2005 →

Lindsay Davenport and Lisa Raymond were the defending champions but they competed with different partners in 2004, Davenport with Corina Morariu and Raymond with Martina Navratilova.

Davenport and Morariu lost in the semifinals to Virginia Ruano Pascual and Paola Suárez, while Raymond and Navratilova lost to Anastasia Myskina and Vera Zvonareva in the second round.

Pascual and Suárez went on to win in the final 6–1, 6–2 against Svetlana Kuznetsova and Elena Likhovtseva.

== Seeds ==
Champion seeds are indicated in bold text while text in italics indicates the round in which those seeds were eliminated.

1. (Spain) **Virginia Ruano Pascual** / (Argentina) **Paola Suárez (champions)**
2. (Russia) Svetlana Kuznetsova / (Russia) Elena Likhovtseva (final)
3. (United States) Martina Navratilova / (United States) Lisa Raymond (quarterfinals)
4. (Zimbabwe) Cara Black / (Australia) Rennae Stubbs (second round)
5. (South Africa) Liezel Huber / (Bulgaria) Magdalena Maleeva (second round)
6. (Slovakia) Janette Husárová / (Spain) Conchita Martínez (quarterfinals)
7. (Russia) Nadia Petrova / (United States) Meghann Shaughnessy (quarterfinals)
8. (France) Marion Bartoli / (France) Émilie Loit (quarterfinals)

== Draw ==
=== Key ===
- Q = Qualifier
- WC = Wild card
- LL = Lucky loser
- Alt = Alternate
- SE = Special exempt
- PR = Protected ranking
- ITF = ITF entry
- JE = Junior exempt
- w/o = Walkover
- r = Retired
- d = Defaulted
- SR = Special ranking

=== Final ===
Final
1	(Spain) **Virginia Ruano Pascual** (Argentina) **Paola Suárez**	**6**	**6**
2	(Russia) Svetlana Kuznetsova (Russia) Elena Likhovtseva	1	2

=== Top half ===
First round
1	(Spain) **V Ruano Pascual** (Argentina) **P Suárez**	**6**	**6**
(Japan) N Miyagis (United States) S Reeves	1	2
(Australia) **L McShea** (Italy) **Ad Serra Zanetti**	**6**	**6**
WC	(Russia) M Kirilenko (Russia) M Sharapova	1	1
(Ukraine) **T Perebiynis** (Croatia) **S Talaja**	**6**	4	**6**
(Switzerland) E Gagliardi (Hungary) P Mandula	4	**6**	2
WC	(Italy) M Camerin (Colombia) F Zuluaga	3	1
5	(South Africa) **L Huber** (Bulgaria) **M Maleeva**	**6**	**6**
4	(Zimbabwe) **C Black** (Australia) **R Stubbs**	**6**	**6**
WC	(United States) J Hopkins (United States) B Mattek	4	1
(Belgium) E Callens (United States) M Tu	2	**6**	2
(United States) **L Davenport** (United States) **C Morariu**	**6**	4	**6**
(Australia) **A Molik** (Spain) **M Serna**	6	**6**	**7**
(Argentina) G Dulko (Italy) R Grande	**7^{7}**	2	6^{2}
(Italy) F Schiavone (United States) A Stevenson	4	**6**	3
7	(Russia) **N Petrova** (United States) **M Shaughnessy**	**6**	4	**6**

Second round
1	(Spain) **V Ruano Pascual** (Argentina) **P Suárez**	**6**	3	**7**
(Australia) L McShea (Italy) Ad Serra Zanetti	0	**6**	6^{4}
(Ukraine) **T Perebiynis** (Croatia) **S Talaja**	**6**	3	**6**
5	(South Africa) L Huber (Bulgaria) M Maleeva	3	**6**	3
4	(Zimbabwe) C Black (Australia) R Stubbs	4	4
(United States) **L Davenport** (United States) **C Morariu**	**6**	**6**
(Australia) A Molik (Spain) M Serna
7	(Russia) **N Petrova** (United States) **M Shaughnessy**	**w/o**

Quarterfinals
1	(Spain) **V Ruano Pascual** (Argentina) **P Suárez**	**w/o**
(Ukraine) T Perebiynis (Croatia) S Talaja
(United States) **L Davenport** (United States) **C Morariu**	**7**	5	**6**
7	(Russia) N Petrova (United States) M Shaughnessy	5	**7**	1

Semifinals
1	(Spain) **V Ruano Pascual** (Argentina) **P Suárez**	3	**6**	**6**
(United States) L Davenport (United States) C Morariu	**6**	3	3

=== Bottom half ===
First round
8	(France) **M Bartoli** (France) **É Loit**	**6**	**6**
(Romania) R Dragomir (Argentina) P Tarabini	4	0
(Czech Republic) I Benešová (Czech Republic) R Voráčová	3	4
Q	(Czech Republic) **D Chládková** (Slovakia) **L Kurhajcová**	**6**	**6**
(Russia) **A Myskina** (Russia) **V Zvonareva**	**6**	**6**
(Ukraine) Y Beygelzimer (Spain) C Martínez Granados	2	2
(Japan) Shinobu Asagoe (Russia) A Jidkova	6^{5}	**6**	4
3	(United States) **M Navratilova** (United States) **L Raymond**	**7**	4	**6**
6	(Slovakia) **J Husárová** (Spain) **C Martínez**	**6**	**6**
(United States) T Ashley (United States) J Craybas	4	3
(Bosnia and Herzegovina) M Jugić-Salkić (Slovakia) H Nagyová	5	**6**	3
(Greece) **E Daniilidou** (Italy) **T Garbin**	**7**	1	**6**
(Croatia) **J Kostanić** (Chinese Taipei) **J Lee**	**6**	**6**
(United States) L Granville (United States) A Spears	3	4
(Slovakia) D Hantuchová (Austria) B Schett	1	1
2	(Russia) **S Kuznetsova** (Russia) **E Likhovtseva**	**6**	**6**

Second round
8	(France) **M Bartoli** (France) **É Loit**	**6**	**6**
Q	(Czech Republic) D Chládková (Slovakia) L Kurhajcová	3	1
(Russia) **A Myskina** (Russia) **V Zvonareva**	**6**	**6**
3	(United States) M Navratilova (United States) L Raymond	2	4
8	(Slovakia) **J Husárová** (Spain) **C Martínez**	**6**	**6**
(Greece) E Daniilidou (Italy) T Garbin	0	2
(Croatia) J Kostanić (Chinese Taipei) J Lee	3	**6**	5
2	(Russia) **S Kuznetsova** (Russia) **E Likhovtseva**	**6**	4	**6**

Quarterfinals
8	(France) M Bartoli (France) É Loit	4	5
4	(Russia) **A Myskina** (Russia) **V Zvonareva**	**6**	**7**
8	(Slovakia) J Husárová (Spain) C Martínez	1	1
2	(Russia) **S Kuznetsova** (Russia) **E Likhovtseva**	**6**	**6**

Semifinals
7	(Russia) A Myskina (Russia) V Zvonareva	2	0
8	(Russia) **S Kuznetsova** (Russia) **E Likhovtseva**	**6**	**6**

== Qualifying ==
=== Seeds ===
1. (Republic of Ireland) Kelly Liggan / (Venezuela) María Vento-Kabchi (qualifying competition)
2. (Italy) Antonella Serra Zanetti / (Australia) Bryanne Stewart (first round)

=== Qualifiers ===
1. **(Czech Republic) Denisa Chládková / (Slovakia) Ľubomíra Kurhajcová**

=== Qualifying draw ===
First round
1	**(Republic of Ireland) K Liggan** **(Venezuela) M Vento-Kabchi**	**8**
(Japan) A Morigami (Japan) S Obata	6
WC	(France) T Golovin (United States) A Haynes	6
**(Spain) M Marrero** **(Italy) F Pennetta**	**8**
(Spain) A Medina Garr. (Spain) A Parra Santonja	8^{3}
**(France) S Foretz** **(Luxembourg) C Schaul**	**9^{7}**
**(Czech Republic) D Chládková** **(Slovakia) Ľ Kurhajcová**	**8**
2	(Italy) An Serra Zanetti (Australia) B Stewart	4

Second round
1	**(Republic of Ireland) K Liggan** **(Venezuela) M Vento-Kabchi**	**8**
(Spain) M Marrero (Italy) F Pennetta	1
(France) S Foretz (Luxembourg) C Schaul	2
**(Czech Republic) D Chládková** **(Slovakia) Ľ Kurhajcová**	**8**

Qualifying competition
1	(Republic of Ireland) K Liggan (Venezuela) M Vento-Kabchi	1	1
**(Czech Republic) D Chládková** **(Slovakia) Ľ Kurhajcová**	**6**	**6**
