= 2005 Davidoff Swiss Indoors – Doubles =

Doubles
- 2005 Davidoff Swiss Indoors

Final
- Champions: (Argentina) Agustín Calleri (Chile) Fernando González
- Runners-up: (Australia) Stephen Huss (South Africa) Wesley Moodie
- Score: 7–5, 7–5

Details
- Draw: 16
- Seeds: 4

Events
Singles	Doubles
- Swiss Indoors

Bob Bryan and Mike Bryan were the defending champions, but lost in the semifinals to Agustín Calleri and Fernando González.

Agustín Calleri and Fernando González won in the final 7–5, 7–5, against Stephen Huss and Wesley Moodie.

== Seeds ==
1. (United States) Bob Bryan / (United States) Mike Bryan (semifinals)
2. (Zimbabwe) Wayne Black / (Canada) Daniel Nestor (semifinals)
3. (India) Leander Paes / (Serbia and Montenegro) Nenad Zimonjić (first round)
4. (Australia) Stephen Huss / (South Africa) Wesley Moodie (final)

== Draw ==
Key

- Q = Qualifier
- WC = Wild card
- LL = Lucky loser
- Alt = Alternate
- ITF = ITF entry
- PR = Protected ranking
- SR = Special ranking
- SE = Special exempt
- JE = Junior exempt
- JR = Junior Accelerator Programme entrant
- CO = College Accelerator Programme entrant
- NG = Next Gen Accelerator Program entrant
- w/o = Walkover
- r = Retired
- d = Defaulted

=== Draw ===
First round
1	(United States) B Bryan (United States) M Bryan	6	6
WC	(Switzerland) Y Allegro (Switzerland) I Heuberger	3	0
(Argentina) J Acasuso (Argentina) G Coria	6^{1}	6	2
(Argentina) D Nalbandian (Argentina) S Prieto	7^{7}	1	6
3	(India) L Paes (Serbia and Montenegro) N Zimonjić	6^{4}	3
ALT	(Croatia) I Karlović (Croatia) L Zovko	7^{7}	6
(Argentina) A Calleri (Chile) F González	7^{7}	6
(Germany) M Kohlmann (Germany) A Waske	6^{4}	4
(Spain) Á López Morón (Romania) R Sabău	3	6	5
(Slovakia) D Hrbatý (Czech Republic) J Levinský	6	4	7
(Cyprus) M Baghdatis (Thailand) P Srichaphan	6^{4}	2
4	(Australia) S Huss (South Africa) W Moodie	7^{7}	6
(Czech Republic) T Berdych (Czech Republic) J Novák	6	6
WC	(Switzerland) M Rosset (Switzerland) S Wawrinka	3	3
(Belgium) C Rochus (Czech Republic) T Zíb	3	2
2	(Zimbabwe) W Black (Canada) D Nestor	6	6

Quarterfinals
1	(United States) B Bryan (United States) M Bryan	4	7^{7}	6
(Argentina) D Nalbandian (Argentina) S Prieto	6	6^{1}	4
ALT	(Croatia) I Karlović (Croatia) L Zovko
(Argentina) A Calleri (Chile) F González	w/o
(Slovakia) D Hrbatý (Czech Republic) J Levinský	4	6^{4}
4	(Australia) S Huss (South Africa) W Moodie	6	7^{7}
(Czech Republic) T Berdych (Czech Republic) J Novák	3	4
2	(Zimbabwe) W Black (Canada) D Nestor	6	6

Semifinals
1	(United States) B Bryan (United States) M Bryan	4	6	2
(Argentina) A Calleri (Chile) F González	6	2	6
4	(Australia) S Huss (South Africa) W Moodie	7	6
2	(Zimbabwe) W Black (Canada) D Nestor	5	3

Final
(Argentina) A Calleri (Chile) F González	7	7
4	(Australia) S Huss (South Africa) W Moodie	5	5
