= 2004 Monte Carlo Masters – Doubles =

Doubles
- 2004 Monte Carlo Masters

Final
- Champions: (United Kingdom) Tim Henman (Serbia and Montenegro) Nenad Zimonjić
- Runners-up: (Argentina) Gastón Etlis (Argentina) Martín Rodríguez
- Score: 7–5, 6–2

Events
Singles	Doubles
← 2003 ·	Monte Carlo Masters	· 2005 →

Mahesh Bhupathi and Max Mirnyi were the defending champions but lost in the quarterfinals to Gastón Etlis and Martín Rodríguez.

Tim Henman and Nenad Zimonjić won in the final 7–5, 6–2 against Etlis and Rodríguez.

== Seeds ==
All eight seeded teams received byes to the second round.

1. (India) Mahesh Bhupathi / (Belarus) Max Mirnyi (quarterfinals)
2. (Sweden) Jonas Björkman / (Australia) Todd Woodbridge (quarterfinals)
3. (France) Michaël Llodra / (France) Fabrice Santoro (second round)
4. (The Bahamas) Mark Knowles / (Canada) Daniel Nestor (semifinals)
5. (Czech Republic) Martin Damm / (Czech Republic) Cyril Suk (semifinals)
6. (Israel) Jonathan Erlich / (Israel) Andy Ram (second round)
7. (Argentina) Gastón Etlis / (Argentina) Martín Rodríguez (final)
8. (United States) Jared Palmer / (Czech Republic) Pavel Vízner (quarterfinals)

== Draw ==
=== Key ===
- Q = Qualifier
- WC = Wild card
- LL = Lucky loser
- Alt = Alternate
- SE = Special exempt
- PR = Protected ranking
- ITF = ITF entry
- JE = Junior exempt
- w/o = Walkover
- r = Retired
- d = Defaulted
- SR = Special ranking

=== Finals ===
Semifinals

Final

7
- (Argentina) Gastón Etlis
- (Argentina) Martín Rodríguez
6
5
7

4
- (The Bahamas) Mark Knowles
- (Canada) Daniel Nestor
2
7
5

7
- (Argentina) Gastón Etlis
- (Argentina) Martín Rodríguez
5
2

- (United Kingdom) Tim Henman
- (Serbia and Montenegro) Nenad Zimonjić
7
6

- (United Kingdom) Tim Henman
- (Serbia and Montenegro) Nenad Zimonjić
6
7^{7}

5
- (Czech Republic) Martin Damm
- (Czech Republic) Cyril Suk
4
6^{5}

=== Top half ===
First round

Second round

Quarterfinals

Semifinals

1
- (India) M Bhupathi
- (Belarus) M Mirnyi
6
6

- (Sweden) T Johansson
- (Czech Republic) J Novák
6
2
3

WC
- (France) J Benneteau
- (France) N Mahut
1
4

WC
- (France) J Benneteau
- (France) N Mahut
2
6
6

1
- (India) M Bhupathi
- (Belarus) M Mirnyi
4
6^{5}

- (Italy) M Bertolini
- (South Africa) R Koenig
7^{7}
6

7
- (Argentina) G Etlis
- (Argentina) M Rodríguez
6
7^{7}

- (Argentina) M Hood
- (Argentina) S Prieto
6^{3}
4

- (Italy) M Bertolini
- (South Africa) R Koenig
6^{2}
6
3

7
- (Argentina) G Etlis
- (Argentina) M Rodríguez
7^{7}
3
6

7
- (Argentina) G Etlis
- (Argentina) M Rodríguez
6
5
7

4
- (The Bahamas) M Knowles
- (Canada) D Nestor
2
7
5

4
- (The Bahamas) M Knowles
- (Canada) D Nestor
7
6

- (Slovakia) D Hrbatý
- (Thailand) P Srichaphan
2
6
3

- (Czech Republic) F Čermák
- (Czech Republic) L Friedl
5
3

- (Czech Republic) F Čermák
- (Czech Republic) L Friedl
6
3
6

4
- (The Bahamas) M Knowles
- (Canada) D Nestor
6
6

- (Poland) M Fyrstenberg
- (Poland) M Matkowski
7^{7}
4
6

8
- (United States) J Palmer
- (Czech Republic) P Vízner
3
4

- (Argentina) L Arnold
- (Argentina) M García
6^{5}
6
4

- (Poland) M Fyrstenberg
- (Poland) M Matkowski
4
4

8
- (United States) J Palmer
- (Czech Republic) P Vízner
6
6

=== Bottom half ===
First round

Second round

Quarterfinals

Semifinals

6
- (Israel) J Erlich
- (Israel) A Ram
1
4

WC
- (France) N Escudé
- (Russia) M Safin
2
2

- (Chile) F González
- (Chile) N Massú
6
6

- (Chile) F González
- (Chile) N Massú
6
6

- (Chile) F González
- (Chile) N Massú
6^{7}
4

- (United Kingdom) T Henman
- (Serbia and Montenegro) N Zimonjić
6
3
6

- (United Kingdom) T Henman
- (Serbia and Montenegro) N Zimonjić
7^{9}
6

- (France) A Clément
- (France) S Grosjean
2
6
1

- (United Kingdom) T Henman
- (Serbia and Montenegro) N Zimonjić
6
6

3
- (France) M Llodra
- (France) F Santoro
3
2

- (United Kingdom) T Henman
- (Serbia and Montenegro) N Zimonjić
6
7^{7}

5
- (Czech Republic) M Damm
- (Czech Republic) C Suk
4
6^{5}

5
- (Czech Republic) M Damm
- (Czech Republic) C Suk
7
6

- (Czech Republic) T Cibulec
- (Czech Republic) P Pála
1
6
6

- (Czech Republic) T Cibulec
- (Czech Republic) P Pála
5
4

- (Australia) P Hanley
- (Czech Republic) R Štěpánek
6
3
2

5
- (Czech Republic) M Damm
- (Czech Republic) C Suk
6
7^{7}

- (South Africa) C Haggard
- (Armenia) S Sargsian
3
6
5

2
- (Sweden) J Björkman
- (Australia) T Woodbridge
3
6^{5}

- (Argentina) A Calleri
- (Argentina) G Cañas
6
4
7

- (Argentina) A Calleri
- (Argentina) G Cañas
3
4

2
- (Sweden) J Björkman
- (Australia) T Woodbridge
6
6
