= 2004 Davidoff Swiss Indoors =

- Date: 24–30 October
- Edition: 35th
- Category: International Series
- Draw: 32S / 16D
- Prize money: $975,000
- Location: Basel, Switzerland
- Venue: St. Jakobshalle

Champions

Singles
- (Czech Republic) Jiří Novák

Doubles
- (United States) Bob Bryan / (United States) Mike Bryan
← 2003 ·	Swiss Indoors	· 2005 →

The 2004 Davidoff Swiss Indoors was a men's tennis tournament played on indoor carpet courts. It was the 35th edition of the event known that year as the Davidoff Swiss Indoors, and was part of the International Series of the 2004 ATP Tour. It took place at the St. Jakobshalle in Basel, Switzerland, from 24 October through 30 October 2004. Unseeded Jiří Novák won the singles title.

== Finals ==
=== Singles ===
(Czech Republic) Jiří Novák defeated (Argentina) David Nalbandian, 5–7, 6–3, 6–4, 1–6, 6–2

=== Doubles ===
(United States) Bob Bryan / (United States) Mike Bryan defeated (Argentina) Lucas Arnold Ker / (Argentina) Mariano Hood, 7–6^{(11–9)}, 6–2
