= 2004 Open 13 =

- Date: 23–29 February
- Edition: 12th
- Category: International Series
- Draw: 32S / 16D
- Prize money: $600,000
- Surface: Hard / indoor
- Location: Marseille, France
- Venue: Palais des Sports de Marseille

Champions

Singles
- (Slovakia) Dominik Hrbatý

Doubles
- (The Bahamas) Mark Knowles / (Canada) Daniel Nestor
- Open 13

The 2004 Open 13 was a men's tennis tournament played on indoor hard courts at the Palais des Sports de Marseille in Marseille in France and was part of the International Series of the 2004 ATP Tour. It was the 12th of the tournament and was held from 23 February until 29 February 2004. Unseeded Dominik Hrbatý won the singles title.

== Finals ==
=== Singles ===
(Slovakia) Dominik Hrbatý defeated (Sweden) Robin Söderling 4–6, 6–4, 6–4

- It was Hrbatý's 3rd title of the year and the 8th of his career.

=== Doubles ===
(The Bahamas) Mark Knowles / (Canada) Daniel Nestor defeated (Czech Republic) Martin Damm / (Czech Republic) Cyril Suk 7–5, 6–3

- It was Knowles's 1st title of the year and the 31st of his career. It was Nestor's 1st title of the year and the 33rd of his career.
