= 2004 Canada Masters and the Rogers AT&T Cup =

Combined WTA/ATP tennis tournament

2004 Canada Masters
- Date: July 26 – August 1 (men); August 2–8 (women)
- Edition: 115th
- Category: Masters Series (ATP); Tier I Series (WTA)
- Surface: Hard / outdoor
- Location: Toronto, Ontario, Canada (ATP); Montreal, Quebec, Canada (WTA)
- Venue: Rexall Centre (ATP); Uniprix Stadium (WTA)

Champions

Men's singles
- (Switzerland) Roger Federer

Women's singles
- (France) Amélie Mauresmo

Men's doubles
- (India) Mahesh Bhupathi / (India) Leander Paes

Women's doubles
- (Japan) Shinobu Asagoe / (Japan) Ai Sugiyama
- Canadian Open

The 2004 Canada Masters and the Rogers AT&T Cup were tennis tournaments played on outdoor hard courts. It was the 115th edition of the Canada Masters, and was part of the ATP Masters Series of the 2004 ATP Tour, and of the Tier I Series of the 2004 WTA Tour. The men's event took place at the Rexall Centre in Toronto, Ontario, Canada, from July 26 through August 1, 2004, and the women's event at the Uniprix Stadium in Montreal, Quebec, Canada, from August 2 through August 8, 2004.

The men's draw was headlined by World No. 1, Australian Open and Wimbledon champion Roger Federer, Wimbledon finalist and recent Indianapolis titlist Andy Roddick, and French Open runner-up and Monte Carlo winner Guillermo Coria. Other top seeds were 2004 Rome Masters champion Carlos Moyá, Indian Wells runner-up Tim Henman, David Nalbandian, Juan Carlos Ferrero and Rainer Schüttler.

The women's field was led by WTA No. 2, Rome and Berlin winner Amélie Mauresmo, Roland-Garros champion Anastasia Myskina, and French Open runner-up Elena Dementieva. Among other top players present were former World No. 1 Jennifer Capriati, seventeen-year-old Wimbledon champion Maria Sharapova, Ai Sugiyama, Nadia Petrova and Paola Suárez.

== Finals ==
=== Men's singles ===
(Switzerland) Roger Federer defeated (United States) Andy Roddick, 7–5, 6–3

- It was Roger Federer's 8th title of the year, and his 19th overall. It was his 3rd Masters title of the year, and his 4th overall.

=== Women's singles ===
(France) Amélie Mauresmo defeated (Russia) Elena Likhovtseva, 6–1, 6–0

- It was Amélie Mauresmo's 3rd title of the year, and her 13th overall. It was her 3rd Tier I title of the year, her 5th overall, and her 2nd win at the event.

=== Men's doubles ===
(India) Mahesh Bhupathi / (India) Leander Paes defeated (Sweden) Jonas Björkman / (Belarus) Max Mirnyi, 6–4, 6–2

=== Women's doubles ===
(Japan) Shinobu Asagoe / (Japan) Ai Sugiyama defeated (South Africa) Liezel Huber / (Thailand) Tamarine Tanasugarn, 6–0, 6–3
