= 2004 Qatar Open =

2004 Qatar ExxonMobil Open
- Date: 5–11 January 2004
- Edition: 12th
- Category: International Series
- Draw: 32S / 16D
- Prize money: $975,000
- Surface: Hard / outdoor
- Location: Doha, Qatar
- Venue: Khalifa International Tennis Complex

Champions

Singles
- (France) Nicolas Escudé

Doubles
- (Czech Republic) Martin Damm / (Czech Republic) Cyril Suk
- ATP Qatar Open

The 2004 Qatar Open, known as the 2004 Qatar ExxonMobil Open for sponsorship reasons, was a tennis tournament played on outdoor hard courts at the Khalifa International Tennis Complex in Doha in Qatar and was part of the International Series of the 2004 ATP Tour. The tournament ran from 5 January through 11 January 2004. Unseeded Nicolas Escudé, who entered the main draw on a wildcard, won the singles title.

== Finals ==
=== Singles ===
(France) Nicolas Escudé defeated (Croatia) Ivan Ljubičić 6–3, 7–6^{(7–4)}

=== Doubles ===
(Czech Republic) Martin Damm / (Czech Republic) Cyril Suk defeated (Austria) Stefan Koubek / (United States) Andy Roddick 6–2, 6–4
