= 2004 Rogers AT&T Cup – Doubles =

Women's tennis tournament

Doubles
- 2004 Rogers AT&T Cup

Final
- Champions: (Japan) Shinobu Asagoe (Japan) Ai Sugiyama
- Runners-up: (South Africa) Liezel Huber (Thailand) Tamarine Tanasugarn
- Score: 6–0, 6–3

Details
- Draw: 28
- Seeds: 8

Events
Singles	Doubles
- Rogers AT&T Cup

Svetlana Kuznetsova and Martina Navratilova were the defending champions, but chose not to participate that year.

Shinobu Asagoe and Ai Sugiyama won in the final 6–0, 6–3, against Liezel Huber and Tamarine Tanasugarn.

== Seeds ==
The top four seeds received a bye into the second round.

1. (Spain) Virginia Ruano Pascual / (Argentina) Paola Suárez (semifinals)
2. (Russia) Elena Likhovtseva / (Russia) Vera Zvonareva (quarterfinals)
3. (Venezuela) María Vento-Kabchi / (Indonesia) Angelique Widjaja (second round)
4. (South Africa) Liezel Huber / (Thailand) Tamarine Tanasugarn (final)
5. (Japan) Shinobu Asagoe / (Japan) Ai Sugiyama (champions)
6. (Belgium) Els Callens / (Russia) Lina Krasnoroutskaya (first round, retired due to a right wrist sprain for Krasnoroutskaya)
7. (Argentina) Gisela Dulko / (Argentina) Patricia Tarabini (second round)
8. (United States) Ansley Cargill / (Australia) Bryanne Stewart (quarterfinals)

== Draw ==
Key

- Q = Qualifier
- WC = Wild card
- LL = Lucky loser
- Alt = Alternate
- ITF = ITF entry
- PR = Protected ranking
- SR = Special ranking
- SE = Special exempt
- JE = Junior exempt
- JR = Junior Accelerator Programme entrant
- CO = College Accelerator Programme entrant
- NG = Next Gen Accelerator Program entrant
- w/o = Walkover
- r = Retired
- d = Defaulted

=== Finals ===
Semifinals
1	(Spain) Virginia Ruano Pascual (Argentina) Paola Suárez	3	6	4
4	(South Africa) Liezel Huber (Thailand) Tamarine Tanasugarn	6	2	6
WC	(France) Amélie Mauresmo (France) Mary Pierce	2	5
5	(Japan) Shinobu Asagoe (Japan) Ai Sugiyama	6	7

Final
4	(South Africa) Liezel Huber (Thailand) Tamarine Tanasugarn	0	3
5	(Japan) Shinobu Asagoe (Japan) Ai Sugiyama	6	6

=== Top half ===
First round
(Japan) N Miyagi (United States) L Osterloh	7	7
(United States) A Augustus (United States) J Russell	6^{6}	6^{1}
WC	(Canada) M Marois (Canada) M-È Pelletier	6^{7}	4
(Canada) M Drake (United States) L Lee-Waters	7	6
(Russia) A Jidkova (Japan) A Morigami	6	4	3
7	(Argentina) G Dulko (Argentina) P Tarabini	2	6	6
(Latvia) L Dekmeijere (Germany) A Matic	2	6	6
(Czech Republic) B Strýcová (Russia) G Voskoboeva	6	2	4
(Italy) R Grande (United States) M Washington	w/o
(United States) A Harkleroad (United States) K McCain
WC	(Canada) S Dubois (Canada) A Wozniak	1	6	4
8	(United States) A Cargill (Australia) B Stewart	6	4	6

Second round
1	(Spain) V Ruano Pascual (Argentina) P Suárez	6	6
(Japan) N Miyagi (United States) L Osterloh	2	2
(Canada) M Drake (United States) L Lee-Waters	6	3	7
7	(Argentina) G Dulko (Argentina) P Tarabini	2	6	6^{3}
4	(South Africa) L Huber (Thailand) T Tanasugarn	6	6
(Latvia) L Dekmeijere (Germany) A Matic	4	4
(Italy) R Grande (United States) M Washington	6^{7}	4
8	(United States) A Cargill (Australia) B Stewart	7	6

Quarterfinals
1	(Spain) V Ruano Pascual (Argentina) P Suárez	6	6
(Canada) M Drake (United States) L Lee-Waters	2	3
4	(South Africa) L Huber (Thailand) T Tanasugarn	6	4	6
8	(United States) A Cargill (Australia) B Stewart	4	6	4

Semifinals
1	(Spain) V Ruano Pascual (Argentina) P Suárez	3	6	4
4	(South Africa) L Huber (Thailand) T Tanasugarn	6	2	6

=== Bottom half ===
First round
6	(Belgium) E Callens (Russia) L Krasnoroutskaya	4	r
(Brazil) MF Alves (Turkey) İ Şenoğlu	6
(Spain) M Marrero (Spain) A Parra Santonja	6^{5}	6	5
(France) T Golovin (Australia) L McShea	7	4	7
WC	(France) A Mauresmo (France) M Pierce	6	6
(United States) B Mattek (United States) S Perry	2	3
5	(Japan) S Asagoe (Japan) A Sugiyama	7	6
Q	(Puerto Rico) K Brandi (Paraguay) R Neffa-de los Ríos	6^{5}	4
(United States) T Ashley (United States) L Granville	7	6^{6}	7
(New Zealand) L Baker (Italy) F Lubiani	6^{7}	7	5
(Serbia and Montenegro) J Janković (Luxembourg) A Kremer	1	5
(United States) J Craybas (Germany) M Weingärtner	6	7

Second round
(Brazil) MF Alves (Turkey) İ Şenoğlu	6^{5}	6	6
(France) T Golovin (Australia) L McShea	7	3	0
WC	(France) A Mauresmo (France) M Pierce	6	6
3	(Venezuela) M Vento-Kabchi (Indonesia) A Widjaja	4	4
5	(Japan) S Asagoe (Japan) A Sugiyama	6	5	6
(United States) T Ashley (United States) L Granville	4	7	0
(United States) J Craybas (Germany) M Weingärtner	1	2
2	(Russia) E Likhovtseva (Russia) V Zvonareva	6	6

Quarterfinals
(Brazil) MF Alves (Turkey) İ Şenoğlu	6	4	3
WC	(France) A Mauresmo (France) M Pierce	4	6	6
5	(Japan) S Asagoe (Japan) A Sugiyama	6	6
2	(Russia) E Likhovtseva (Russia) V Zvonareva	2	1

Semifinals
WC	(France) A Mauresmo (France) M Pierce	2	5
5	(Japan) S Asagoe (Japan) A Sugiyama	6	7
