= 2004 Monte Carlo Masters =

- Date: 19–25 April
- Edition: 98th
- Category: ATP Masters Series
- Draw: 64S / 24D
- Prize money: $2,220,000
- Surface: Clay / outdoor
- Location: Roquebrune-Cap-Martin, France
- Venue: Monte Carlo Country Club

Champions

Singles
- (Argentina) Guillermo Coria

Doubles
- (United Kingdom) Tim Henman / (Serbia and Montenegro) Nenad Zimonjić
← 2003 ·	Monte Carlo Masters	· 2005 →

The 2004 Monte Carlo Masters was a men's tennis tournament played on outdoor clay courts. It was the 98th edition of the Monte Carlo Masters and was part of the Masters Series of the 2004 ATP Tour. It took place at the Monte Carlo Country Club in Roquebrune-Cap-Martin in France from 19 April through 25 April 2004. Third-seeded Guillermo Coria won the singles title.

== Finals ==
=== Singles ===
(Argentina) Guillermo Coria defeated (Germany) Rainer Schüttler 6–2, 6–1, 6–3

- It was Coria's 2nd title of the year and the 8th of his career. It was his 1st Masters title of the year and his 2nd overall.

=== Doubles ===
(United Kingdom) Tim Henman / (Serbia and Montenegro) Nenad Zimonjić defeated (Argentina) Gastón Etlis / (Argentina) Martín Rodríguez 7–5, 6–2

- It was Henman's only title of the year and the 15th of his career. It was Zimonjić's only title of the year and the 8th of his career.
