= 2004 Gerry Weber Open =

- Date: 7–14 June
- Edition: 12th
- Category: International Series
- Draw: 32S / 16D
- Prize money: $767,000
- Surface: Grass / outdoor
- Location: Halle, Germany
- Venue: Gerry Weber Stadion

Champions

Singles
- (Switzerland) Roger Federer

Doubles
- (India) Leander Paes / (Czech Republic) David Rikl
- Gerry Weber Open

The 2004 Gerry Weber Open was a men's tennis tournament played on outdoor grass courts. It was the 12th edition of the Gerry Weber Open, and was part of the International Series of the 2004 ATP Tour. It took place at the Gerry Weber Stadion in Halle, North Rhine-Westphalia, Germany, from 7 June through 14 June 2004. First-seeded Roger Federer won his second consecutive singles title at the event.

== Finals ==
=== Singles ===
(Switzerland) Roger Federer defeated (United States) Mardy Fish 6–0, 6–3

- It was Federer's 5th title of the year, and his 22nd overall. It was his 2nd consecutive win at the event.

=== Doubles ===
(India) Leander Paes / (Czech Republic) David Rikl defeated (Czech Republic) Tomáš Cibulec / (Czech Republic) Petr Pála 6–2, 7–5

- It was Paes' first title of the year and the 29th of his career. It was Rikl's first title of the year and the 22nd of his career.
