= 2004 Hamburg Masters =

- Date: 10–17 May
- Edition: 98th
- Category: ATP Masters Series
- Draw: 54S / 24D
- Prize money: $2,200,000
- Surface: Clay / outdoor
- Location: Hamburg, Germany
- Venue: Rothenbaum Tennis Center

Champions

Singles
- (Switzerland) Roger Federer

Doubles
- (Zimbabwe) Wayne Black / (Zimbabwe) Kevin Ullyett
← 2003 ·	Hamburg Masters	· 2005 →

The 2004 Hamburg Masters was a men's tennis tournament played on outdoor clay courts. It was the 98th edition of the Hamburg Masters, and was part of the ATP Masters Series of the 2004 ATP Tour. It took place at the Rothenbaum Tennis Center in Hamburg, Germany, from 10 May through 17 May 2004. First-seeded Roger Federer won the singles title.

== Finals ==
=== Singles ===
(Switzerland) Roger Federer defeated (Argentina) Guillermo Coria 4–6, 6–4, 6–2, 6–3

- It was Roger Federer's 4th title of the year, and his 15th overall. It was his 2nd Masters title of the year, and his 3rd overall. It was his second title at the event after winning in 2002.

=== Doubles ===
(Zimbabwe) Wayne Black / (Zimbabwe) Kevin Ullyett defeated (United States) Bob Bryan / (United States) Mike Bryan 6–4, 6–2
