= 2004 Pacific Life Open =

- Date: March 10–21
- Edition: 31st
- Category: tennis Masters Series (ATP); Tier I Series (WTA)
- Prize money: $2,529,000
- Surface: Hard / outdoor
- Location: Indian Wells, CA, US
- Venue: Indian Wells Tennis Garden

Champions

Men's singles
- (Switzerland) Roger Federer

Women's singles
- (Belgium) Justine Henin-Hardenne

Men's doubles
- (France) Arnaud Clément / (France) Sébastien Grosjean

Women's doubles
- (Spain) Virginia Ruano Pascual / (Argentina) Paola Suárez
← 2003 ·	Indian Wells Open	· 2005 →

The 2004 Pacific Life Open was a tennis tournament played on outdoor hard courts. It was the 31st edition of the Indian Wells Open and was part of the Masters Series of the 2004 ATP Tour and of Tier I of the 2004 WTA Tour. Both the men's and women's events took place at the Indian Wells Tennis Garden in Indian Wells, California in the United States from March 10 through March 21, 2004.

== Finals ==
=== Men's singles ===
(Switzerland) Roger Federer defeated (United Kingdom) Tim Henman 6–3, 6–3

- It was Federer's 3rd title of the year and the 14th of his career. It was his 1st Masters title of the year and his 2nd overall.

=== Women's singles ===
(Belgium) Justine Henin-Hardenne defeated (United States) Lindsay Davenport 6–1, 6–4

- It was Henin-Hardenne's 4th title of the year and the 20th of her career. It was her 1st Tier I title of the year and her 6th overall.

=== Men's doubles ===
(France) Arnaud Clément / (France) Sébastien Grosjean defeated (Zimbabwe) Wayne Black / (Zimbabwe) Kevin Ullyett 6–3, 4–6, 7–5

- It was Clément's 1st title of the year and the 5th of his career. It was Grosjean's only title of the year and the 7th of his career.

=== Women's doubles ===
(Spain) Virginia Ruano Pascual / (Argentina) Paola Suárez defeated (Russia) Svetlana Kuznetsova / (Russia) Elena Likhovtseva 6–1, 6–2

- It was Ruano Pascual's 2nd title of the year and the 29th of her career. It was Suárez's 2nd title of the year and the 36th of her career.
