= 2004 Italian Open (tennis) =

- Date: 3–9 May (men); 10–16 May (women)
- Edition: 61st
- Surface: Clay / outdoor
- Location: Rome, Italy
- Venue: Foro Italico

Champions

Men's singles
- (Spain) Carlos Moyá

Women's singles
- (France) Amélie Mauresmo

Men's doubles
- (India) Mahesh Bhupathi / (Belarus) Max Mirnyi

Women's doubles
- (Russia) Nadia Petrova / (United States) Meghann Shaughnessy
← 2003 ·	Italian Open	· 2005 →

The 2004 Italian Open (also as 2004 Rome Masters or sponsored title 2004 Telecom Italia Masters) was a tennis tournament played on outdoor clay courts. It was the 61st edition of the Italian Open and was part of the Masters Series of the 2004 ATP Tour and of Tier I of the 2004 WTA Tour. Both the men's and women's events took place at the Foro Italico in Rome in Italy. The men's tournament was played from 3 May through 9 May 2004 while the women's tournament was played from 10 May through 16 May 2004.

== Finals ==
=== Men's singles ===
(Spain) Carlos Moyá defeated (Argentina) David Nalbandian 6–3, 6–3, 6–1

- It was Moyá's 3rd title of the year and the 17th of his career. It was his 1st Masters title of the year and his 3rd overall.

=== Women's singles ===
(France) Amélie Mauresmo defeated (United States) Jennifer Capriati 3–6, 6–3, 7–6^{(8–6)}

- It was Mauresmo's 2nd title of the year and the 13th of her career. It was her 2nd Tier I title of the year and her 4th overall.

=== Men's doubles ===
(India) Mahesh Bhupathi / (Belarus) Max Mirnyi defeated (Australia) Wayne Arthurs / (Australia) Paul Hanley 2–6, 6–3, 6–4

- It was Bhupathi's 3rd title of the year and the 34th of his career. It was Mirnyi's only title of the year and the 21st of his career.

=== Women's doubles ===
(Russia) Nadia Petrova / (United States) Meghann Shaughnessy defeated (Spain) Virginia Ruano Pascual / (Argentina) Paola Suárez 2–6, 6–3, 6–3

- It was Petrova's 4th title of the year and the 8th of her career. It was Shaughnessy's 4th title of the year and the 11th of her career.
