= Gastón Etlis =

Argentine tennis player

- Country (sports): Argentina
- Residence: Buenos Aires, Argentina
- Born: 4 November 1974 (age 50); Buenos Aires, Argentina
- Height: 1.85 m (6 ft 1 in)
- Turned pro: 1993
- Retired: 2006 (played sporadically after)
- Plays: Right-handed (one-handed backhand)
- Coach: Horacio de la Peña
- Prize money: $1,559,459

Singles
- Career record: 30–56
- Career titles: 0
- Highest ranking: No. 114 (22 May 2000)

Grand Slam singles results
- Australian Open: 1R (1996)
- French Open: 2R (1997)
- Wimbledon: Q2 (1997, 1998, 2000)
- US Open: 2R (2002)

Other tournaments
- Olympic Games: 1R (1996)

Doubles
- Career record: 160–162
- Career titles: 4
- Highest ranking: No. 17 (10 January 2005)

Grand Slam doubles results
- Australian Open: SF (2003, 2004)
- French Open: QF (2003, 2004)
- Wimbledon: 3R (2003, 2005)
- US Open: 2R (2000)

Other doubles tournaments
- Olympic Games: 2R (2004)

Gastón Ariel Etlis (born 4 November 1974) is a former tennis player from Argentina.

The right-hander won four career titles in doubles, and reached his highest ATP rankings of World No. 114 in singles May 2000 and World No. 17 in doubles in January 2005. Etlis' greatest success in singles came in the final tournament of his singles career, reaching the semifinals of Costa do Sauípe in 2003.

== Tennis career ==
Etlis turned professional in 1993. He is of Jewish descent.

=== Singles ===
Highlight victories include wins over World No. 40 Carlos Costa in 1995 and World No. 24 Marc Rosset in 1997.

Etlis competed in the singles events at the 1996 Australian Open and the 1996 and 1997 French Open. He then primarily focussed on doubles.

=== Doubles ===
From 2000, Etlis's primary doubles partner was Martin Rodriguez.

In 2000 and 2002, he reached the third round of the French Open.

Etlis competed in the doubles competition of the 2003 Australian Open; he and partner Rodriguez reached the semifinals. After defeating Leander Paes and David Rikl (6–3, 6–3) in the quarterfinals, they lost 3–6, 4–6 played to # 1 seed Mark Knowles and Daniel Nestor. At the 2003 French Open Etlis and Rodriquez reached the quarterfinals, losing to Paul Haarhuis and Yevgeny Kafelnikov. Etlis also competed in mixed doubles with Clarisa Fernández at Roland Garros in 2003. They lost in the quarterfinals to # 4 seed Cara Black and Wayne Black, 6–3, 6–3. Etlis and Rodriguez reached the 3rd round at the 2003 Wimbledon tournament.

In 2004, Etlis and Rodriguez made it to the semifinals at the 2004 Australian Open, where they were defeated 6–2, 7–5 by Michaël Llodra and Fabrice Santoro. They reached the quarterfinal of the 2004 French Open, where they were defeated 6–4, 6–4 by the Belgian team of Xavier Malisse and Olivier Rochus. Etlis and Rodriguez won the Valencia International Series in April 2004.

=== Olympics ===
He represented Argentina at the 1996 Summer Olympics in Atlanta, United States, where he was defeated in the first round by South Africa's Wayne Ferreira.

In the 2004 Olympics he competed in the doubles event with partner Martin Rodriguez, defeating Tommy Robredo and Feliciano López of Spain in the first round and losing to the eventual gold medallists Fernando González and Nicolás Massú in the second.

=== Davis Cup ===
Etlis split two Davis Cup matches in 1996.

== Career finals ==
=== Doubles (4 wins, 10 losses) ===
| Legend Grand Slam (0–0) Tennis Masters Cup (0–0) ATP Masters Series (0–0) ATP International Series Gold (0–0) ATP International Series (4–0) | Titles by surface Hard (1) Grass (0) Clay (3) Carpet (0) |

| Result | W/L | Date | Tournament | Surface | Partner | Opponents | Score |
|---|---|---|---|---|---|---|---|
| Loss | 0–1 | Feb 2000 | Mexico City, Mexico | Clay | (Argentina) Martín Rodríguez | (Zimbabwe) Byron Black (United States) Donald Johnson | 3–6, 5–7 |
| Loss | 0–2 | Jul 2000 | San Marino, San Marino | Clay | (United States) Jack Waite | (Czech Republic) Tomáš Cibulec (Czech Republic) Leoš Friedl | 7–6^{(7–1)}, 7–5 |
| Loss | 0–3 | Sep 2001 | Costa Do Sauipe, Brazil | Hard | (South Africa) Brent Haygarth | (Italy) Enzo Artoni (Brazil) Daniel Melo | 3–6, 6–1, 6–7^{(5–7)} |
| Win | 1–3 | Feb 2002 | Viña del Mar, Chile | Clay | (Argentina) Martín Rodríguez | (Argentina) Lucas Arnold Ker (Argentina) Luis Lobo | 6–3, 6–4 |
| Win | 2–3 | Feb 2002 | Buenos Aires, Argentina | Clay | (Argentina) Martín Rodríguez | (Sweden) Simon Aspelin (Australia) Andrew Kratzmann | 3–6, 6–3, [10–4] |
| Loss | 2–4 | Apr 2002 | Barcelona, Spain | Clay | (Argentina) Lucas Arnold Ker | (Australia) Michael Hill (Czech Republic) Daniel Vacek | 4–6, 4–6 |
| Loss | 2–5. | Jul 2002 | Stuttgart, Germany | Clay | (South Africa) David Adams | (Australia) Joshua Eagle (Czech Republic) David Rikl | 3–6, 4–6 |
| Win | 3–5 | Apr 2004 | Valencia, Spain | Clay | (Argentina) Martín Rodríguez | (Spain) Feliciano López (Spain) Marc López | 7–5, 7–6^{(7–5)} |
| Loss | 3–6 | Apr 2004 | Monte Carlo, Monaco | Clay | (Argentina) Martín Rodríguez | (United Kingdom) Tim Henman (Serbia and Montenegro) Nenad Zimonjić | 5–7, 2–6 |
| Loss | 3–7 | Sep 2004 | Delray Beach, U.S. | Clay | (Argentina) Martín Rodríguez | (India) Leander Paes (Czech Republic) Radek Štěpánek | 0–6, 3–6 |
| Loss | 3–8 | Sep 2004 | Palermo, Italy | Clay | (Argentina) Martín Rodríguez | (Argentina) Lucas Arnold Ker (Argentina) Mariano Hood | 5–7, 2–6 |
| Loss | 3–9 | Oct 2004 | Vienna, Austria | Hard | (Argentina) Martín Rodríguez | (Czech Republic) Martin Damm (Czech Republic) Cyril Suk | 7–6^{(7–4)}, 4–6, 6–7^{(4–7)} |
| Loss | 3–10 | Feb 2005 | Viña del Mar, Chile | Clay | (Argentina) Martín Rodríguez | (Spain) David Ferrer (Spain) Santiago Ventura | 3–6, 4–6 |
| Win | 4–10 | Aug 2005 | New Haven, United States | Hard | (Argentina) Martín Rodríguez | (United States) Rajeev Ram (United States) Bobby Reynolds | 6–4, 6–3 |

== See also ==
- List of select Jewish tennis players
