= 2005 ATP Tour =

Men's tennis circuit

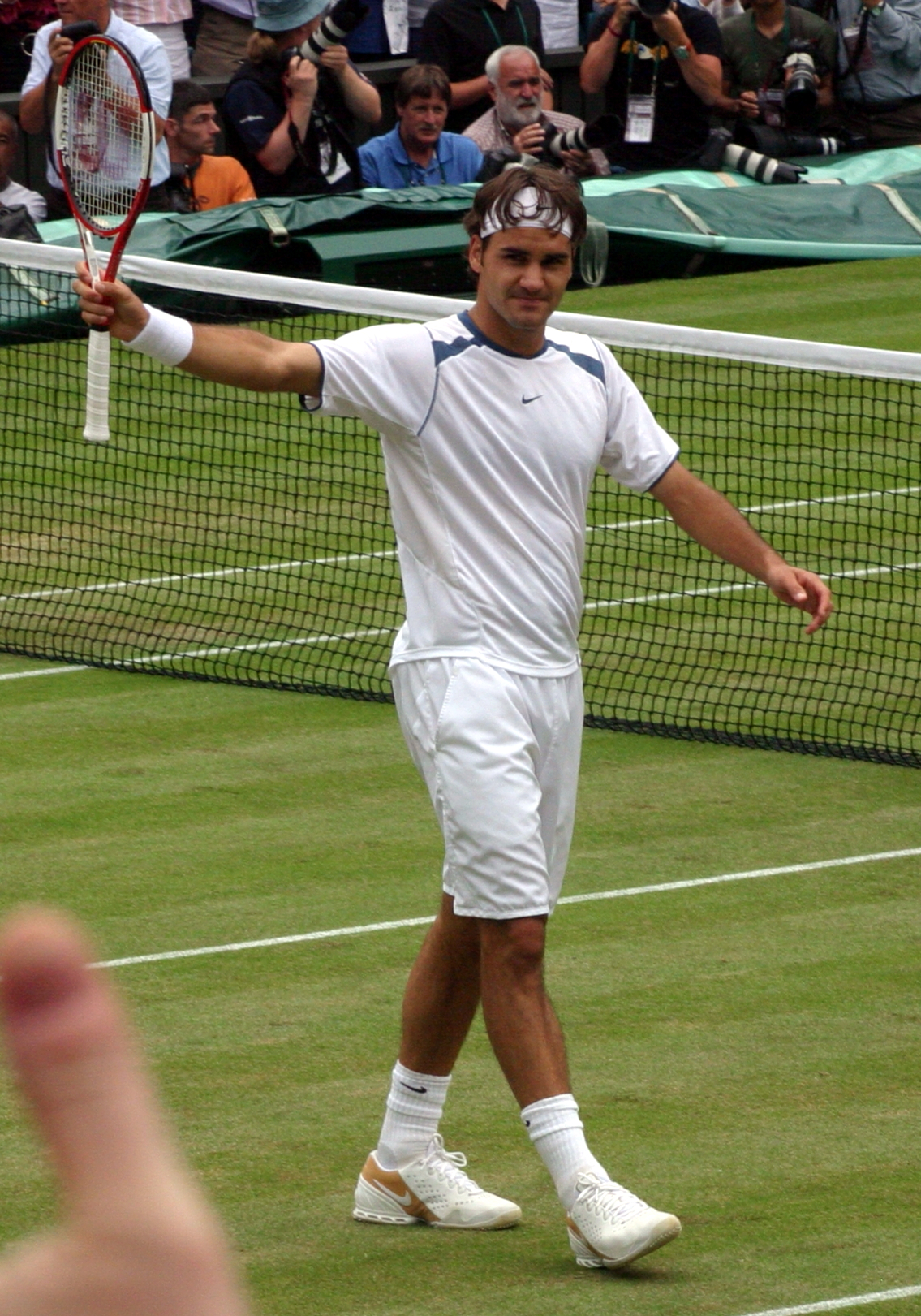
- Roger Federer finished the year ranked world No. 1 for the second time in his career. He won eleven tournaments during the season, including two majors at the Wimbledon Championships and the US Open. He also won four Masters Series events.

Details
- Duration: 1 January – 2 December 2005
- Edition: 36th
- Categories: Grand Slam (4); Tennis Masters Cup; ATP Masters Series (9); ATP International Series Gold (9); ATP International Series (44)

Achievements (singles)
- Most titles: (Switzerland) Roger Federer (11) (Spain) Rafael Nadal (11)
- Most finals: (Switzerland) Roger Federer (12) (Spain) Rafael Nadal (12)
- Prize money leader: (Switzerland) Roger Federer ($6,137,018)
- Points leader: (Switzerland) Roger Federer (6,725)

Awards
- Player of the year: (Switzerland) Roger Federer
- Doubles team of the year: (United States) Bob Bryan (United States) Mike Bryan
- Most improved player of the year: (Spain) Rafael Nadal
- Newcomer of the year: (France) Gaël Monfils
- Comeback player of the year: (United States) James Blake

This is a list of the tournaments played in the 2005 season of Men's tennis (calendar year), including ATP events and ITF events (This does not include the ITF Men's Circuit, only the ATP circuit). Changes were made to match format during this season. The third set of doubles matches was no longer played as a traditional set. Instead it was played as a match tie break first to 10 and clear by 2, to decide the winner.

== Calendar ==
Key

Grand Slam
Tennis Masters Cup
ATP Masters Series
ATP International Series Gold
ATP International Series
Team events

=== January ===
Week	Tournament	Champions	Runners-up	Semifinalists	Quarterfinalists
3 Jan	Hopman Cup; Perth, Australia; ITF Mixed Team Championships; Hard (i) – 8 teams (RR)	Slovakia; 3–0	Argentina	Round Robin (Group A) Germany; Italy; Russia	Round Robin (Group B) Netherlands; Australia; United States
3 Jan	Next Generation Adelaide International; Adelaide, Australia; ATP International Series; Hard – $394,000 – 32S/16D; Singles – Doubles	(Sweden) Joachim Johansson; 7–5, 6–3	(United States) Taylor Dent	(Argentina) Juan Ignacio Chela (Belgium) Olivier Rochus	(Australia) Lleyton Hewitt (Austria) Jürgen Melzer (Germany) Nicolas Kiefer (Sweden) Thomas Enqvist
3 Jan	Next Generation Adelaide International; Adelaide, Australia; ATP International Series; Hard – $394,000 – 32S/16D; Singles – Doubles	(Belgium) Xavier Malisse (Belgium) Olivier Rochus; 7–6^{(7–5)}, 6–4	(Sweden) Simon Aspelin (Australia) Todd Perry	(Argentina) Juan Ignacio Chela (Belgium) Olivier Rochus	(Australia) Lleyton Hewitt (Austria) Jürgen Melzer (Germany) Nicolas Kiefer (Sweden) Thomas Enqvist
3 Jan	Chennai Open; Chennai, India; ATP International Series; Hard – $355,000 – 32S/16D; Singles – Doubles	(Spain) Carlos Moyà; 3–6, 6–4, 7–6^{(7–5)}	(Thailand) Paradorn Srichaphan	(Spain) Guillermo García-López (Czech Republic) Tomáš Zíb	(France) Paul-Henri Mathieu (Czech Republic) Michal Tabara (United States) Justin Gimelstob (Belgium) Kristof Vliegen
3 Jan	Chennai Open; Chennai, India; ATP International Series; Hard – $355,000 – 32S/16D; Singles – Doubles	(Germany) Rainer Schüttler (Chinese Taipei) Yen-Hsun Lu; 7–5, 4–6, 7–6^{(7–4)}	(India) Mahesh Bhupathi (Sweden) Jonas Björkman	(Spain) Guillermo García-López (Czech Republic) Tomáš Zíb	(France) Paul-Henri Mathieu (Czech Republic) Michal Tabara (United States) Justin Gimelstob (Belgium) Kristof Vliegen
3 Jan	Qatar ExxonMobil Open; Doha, Qatar; ATP International Series; Hard – $975,000 – 32S/16D; Singles – Doubles	(Switzerland) Roger Federer; 6–3, 6–1	(Croatia) Ivan Ljubičić	(Russia) Nikolay Davydenko (Spain) Albert Costa	(Spain) Feliciano López (France) Sébastien Grosjean (Spain) Rafael Nadal (France) Fabrice Santoro
3 Jan	Qatar ExxonMobil Open; Doha, Qatar; ATP International Series; Hard – $975,000 – 32S/16D; Singles – Doubles	(Spain) Albert Costa (Spain) Rafael Nadal; 6–3, 4–6, 6–3	(Romania) Andrei Pavel (Russia) Mikhail Youzhny	(Russia) Nikolay Davydenko (Spain) Albert Costa	(Spain) Feliciano López (France) Sébastien Grosjean (Spain) Rafael Nadal (France) Fabrice Santoro
10 Jan	Heineken Open; Auckland, New Zealand; ATP International Series; Hard – $401,000 – 32S/16D; Singles – Doubles	(Chile) Fernando González; 6–4, 6–2	(Belgium) Olivier Rochus	(Czech Republic) Jan Hernych (Argentina) Juan Ignacio Chela	(Argentina) Guillermo Coria (Argentina) José Acasuso (United States) Robby Ginepri (Italy) Potito Starace
10 Jan	Heineken Open; Auckland, New Zealand; ATP International Series; Hard – $401,000 – 32S/16D; Singles – Doubles	(Switzerland) Yves Allegro (Germany) Michael Kohlmann; 6–4, 7–6^{(7–4)}	(Sweden) Simon Aspelin (Australia) Todd Perry	(Czech Republic) Jan Hernych (Argentina) Juan Ignacio Chela	(Argentina) Guillermo Coria (Argentina) José Acasuso (United States) Robby Ginepri (Italy) Potito Starace
10 Jan	Medibank International; Sydney, Australia; ATP International Series; Hard – $419,000 – 32S/16D; Singles – Doubles	(Australia) Lleyton Hewitt; 7–5, 6–0	(Czech Republic) Ivo Minář	(Belarus) Max Mirnyi (Czech Republic) Radek Štěpánek	(Sweden) Thomas Johansson (United States) Taylor Dent (Romania) Andrei Pavel (Spain) Feliciano López
10 Jan	Medibank International; Sydney, Australia; ATP International Series; Hard – $419,000 – 32S/16D; Singles – Doubles	(Australia) Todd Woodbridge (India) Mahesh Bhupathi; 6–3, 6–3	(France) Arnaud Clément (France) Michaël Llodra	(Belarus) Max Mirnyi (Czech Republic) Radek Štěpánek	(Sweden) Thomas Johansson (United States) Taylor Dent (Romania) Andrei Pavel (Spain) Feliciano López
17 Jan; 24 Jan	Australian Open; Melbourne, Australia; Grand Slam; Hard – $6,743,444; 128S/64D/32X; Singles – Doubles – Mixed doubles	(Russia) Marat Safin; 1–6, 6–3, 6–4, 6–4	(Australia) Lleyton Hewitt	(Switzerland) Roger Federer (United States) Andy Roddick	(United States) Andre Agassi (Slovakia) Dominik Hrbatý (Argentina) David Nalbandian (Russia) Nikolay Davydenko
17 Jan; 24 Jan	Australian Open; Melbourne, Australia; Grand Slam; Hard – $6,743,444; 128S/64D/32X; Singles – Doubles – Mixed doubles	(Zimbabwe) Wayne Black (Zimbabwe) Kevin Ullyett; 6–4, 6–4	(United States) Bob Bryan (United States) Mike Bryan	(Switzerland) Roger Federer (United States) Andy Roddick	(United States) Andre Agassi (Slovakia) Dominik Hrbatý (Argentina) David Nalbandian (Russia) Nikolay Davydenko
17 Jan; 24 Jan	Australian Open; Melbourne, Australia; Grand Slam; Hard – $6,743,444; 128S/64D/32X; Singles – Doubles – Mixed doubles	(Australia) Samantha Stosur (Australia) Scott Draper; 6–2, 2–6, [10–6]	(South Africa) Liezel Huber (Zimbabwe) Kevin Ullyett	(Switzerland) Roger Federer (United States) Andy Roddick	(United States) Andre Agassi (Slovakia) Dominik Hrbatý (Argentina) David Nalbandian (Russia) Nikolay Davydenko
31 Jan	Milan Indoor; Milan, Italy; ATP International Series; Carpet (i) – $355,000 – 32S/16D; Singles – Doubles	(Sweden) Robin Söderling; 6–3, 6–7^{(2–7)}, 7–6^{(7–5)}	(Czech Republic) Radek Štěpánek	(Belarus) Max Mirnyi (Croatia) Ivan Ljubičić	(Germany) Tomas Behrend (Ukraine) Sergiy Stakhovsky (Germany) Rainer Schüttler (Slovakia) Karol Beck
31 Jan	Milan Indoor; Milan, Italy; ATP International Series; Carpet (i) – $355,000 – 32S/16D; Singles – Doubles	(Italy) Giorgio Galimberti (Italy) Daniele Bracciali; 6–7^{(8–10)}, 7–6^{(8–6)}, 6–4	(France) Jean-François Bachelot (France) Arnaud Clément	(Belarus) Max Mirnyi (Croatia) Ivan Ljubičić	(Germany) Tomas Behrend (Ukraine) Sergiy Stakhovsky (Germany) Rainer Schüttler (Slovakia) Karol Beck
31 Jan	Movistar Open; Viña del Mar, Chile; ATP International Series; Clay – $380,000 – 32S/16D; Singles – Doubles	(Argentina) Gastón Gaudio; 6–3, 6–4	(Chile) Fernando González	(Spain) David Ferrer (Italy) Filippo Volandri	(Argentina) José Acasuso (Argentina) Agustín Calleri (Spain) Rubén Ramírez Hidalgo (Argentina) Mariano Zabaleta
31 Jan	Movistar Open; Viña del Mar, Chile; ATP International Series; Clay – $380,000 – 32S/16D; Singles – Doubles	(Spain) David Ferrer (Spain) Santiago Ventura; 6–3, 6–4	(Argentina) Gastón Etlis (Argentina) Martín Rodríguez	(Spain) David Ferrer (Italy) Filippo Volandri	(Argentina) José Acasuso (Argentina) Agustín Calleri (Spain) Rubén Ramírez Hidalgo (Argentina) Mariano Zabaleta
31 Jan	Delray Beach International Tennis Championships; Delray Beach, USA; ATP International Series; Hard – $380,000 – 32S/16D; Singles – Doubles	(Belgium) Xavier Malisse; 7–6^{(8–6)}, 6–2	(Czech Republic) Jiří Novák	(United States) Vincent Spadea (South Africa) Wesley Moodie	(United States) Kevin Kim (Paraguay) Ramón Delgado (Netherlands) Peter Wessels (Denmark) Kenneth Carlsen
31 Jan	Delray Beach International Tennis Championships; Delray Beach, USA; ATP International Series; Hard – $380,000 – 32S/16D; Singles – Doubles	(Sweden) Simon Aspelin (Australia) Todd Perry; 6–3, 6–3	(Australia) Jordan Kerr (United States) Jim Thomas	(United States) Vincent Spadea (South Africa) Wesley Moodie	(United States) Kevin Kim (Paraguay) Ramón Delgado (Netherlands) Peter Wessels (Denmark) Kenneth Carlsen

=== February ===
Week	Tournament	Champions	Runners-up	Semifinalists	Quarterfinalists
7 Feb	SAP Open; San Jose, USA; ATP International Series; Hard (i) – $380,000 – 32S/16D; Singles – Doubles	(United States) Andy Roddick; 6–0, 6–4	(France) Cyril Saulnier	(Germany) Tommy Haas (Austria) Jürgen Melzer	(Sweden) Thomas Enqvist (Belarus) Max Mirnyi (United States) Vincent Spadea (United States) Andre Agassi
7 Feb	SAP Open; San Jose, USA; ATP International Series; Hard (i) – $380,000 – 32S/16D; Singles – Doubles	(Australia) Wayne Arthurs (Australia) Paul Hanley; 7–6^{(7–4)}, 6–4	(Switzerland) Yves Allegro (Germany) Michael Kohlmann	(Germany) Tommy Haas (Austria) Jürgen Melzer	(Sweden) Thomas Enqvist (Belarus) Max Mirnyi (United States) Vincent Spadea (United States) Andre Agassi
7 Feb	Open 13; Marseille, France; ATP International Series; Hard (i) – $600,000 – 32S/16D; Singles – Doubles	(Sweden) Joachim Johansson; 7–5, 6–4	(Croatia) Ivan Ljubičić	(Croatia) Mario Ančić (Spain) Feliciano López	(France) Sébastien de Chaunac (Netherlands) Sjeng Schalken (Slovakia) Karol Beck (United States) Taylor Dent
7 Feb	Open 13; Marseille, France; ATP International Series; Hard (i) – $600,000 – 32S/16D; Singles – Doubles	(Czech Republic) Martin Damm (Czech Republic) Radek Štěpánek; 7–6^{(7–4)}, 7–6^{(7–5)}	(The Bahamas) Mark Knowles (Canada) Daniel Nestor	(Croatia) Mario Ančić (Spain) Feliciano López	(France) Sébastien de Chaunac (Netherlands) Sjeng Schalken (Slovakia) Karol Beck (United States) Taylor Dent
7 Feb	ATP Buenos Aires; Buenos Aires, Argentina; ATP International Series; Clay – $380,000 – 32S/16D; Singles – Doubles	(Argentina) Gastón Gaudio; 6–4, 6–4	(Argentina) Mariano Puerta	(Argentina) José Acasuso (Spain) Alberto Martín	(Spain) Carlos Moyà (Spain) Nicolás Almagro (Spain) Félix Mantilla (Spain) Rafael Nadal
7 Feb	ATP Buenos Aires; Buenos Aires, Argentina; ATP International Series; Clay – $380,000 – 32S/16D; Singles – Doubles	(Czech Republic) František Čermák (Czech Republic) Leoš Friedl; 6–2, 7–5	(Argentina) José Acasuso (Argentina) Sebastián Prieto	(Argentina) José Acasuso (Spain) Alberto Martín	(Spain) Carlos Moyà (Spain) Nicolás Almagro (Spain) Félix Mantilla (Spain) Rafael Nadal
14 Feb	Regions Morgan Keegan Championships; Memphis, USA; ATP International Series Gold; Hard (i) – $690,000 – 32S/16D; Singles – Doubles	(Denmark) Kenneth Carlsen; 7–5, 7–5	(Belarus) Max Mirnyi	(United States) Andy Roddick (Germany) Tommy Haas	(United States) Robby Ginepri (United States) Jan-Michael Gambill (France) Antony Dupuis (Belgium) Xavier Malisse
14 Feb	Regions Morgan Keegan Championships; Memphis, USA; ATP International Series Gold; Hard (i) – $690,000 – 32S/16D; Singles – Doubles	(Sweden) Simon Aspelin (Australia) Todd Perry; 6–4, 6–4	(United States) Bob Bryan (United States) Mike Bryan	(United States) Andy Roddick (Germany) Tommy Haas	(United States) Robby Ginepri (United States) Jan-Michael Gambill (France) Antony Dupuis (Belgium) Xavier Malisse
14 Feb	ABN AMRO World Tennis Tournament; Rotterdam, Netherlands; ATP International Series Gold; Hard (i) – $925,000 – 32S/16D; Singles – Doubles	(Switzerland) Roger Federer; 5–7, 7–5, 7–6^{(7–5)}	(Croatia) Ivan Ljubičić	(Croatia) Mario Ančić (Sweden) Thomas Johansson	(Russia) Nikolay Davydenko (United Kingdom) Tim Henman (Czech Republic) Radek Štěpánek (Thailand) Paradorn Srichaphan
14 Feb	ABN AMRO World Tennis Tournament; Rotterdam, Netherlands; ATP International Series Gold; Hard (i) – $925,000 – 32S/16D; Singles – Doubles	(Israel) Jonathan Erlich (Israel) Andy Ram; 6–4, 4–6, 6–3	(Czech Republic) Cyril Suk (Czech Republic) Pavel Vízner	(Croatia) Mario Ančić (Sweden) Thomas Johansson	(Russia) Nikolay Davydenko (United Kingdom) Tim Henman (Czech Republic) Radek Štěpánek (Thailand) Paradorn Srichaphan
14 Feb	Brasil Open; Bahia, Brazil; ATP International Series; Clay – $380,000 – 32S/16D; Singles – Doubles	(Spain) Rafael Nadal; 6–0, 6–7^{(2–7)}, 6–1	(Spain) Alberto Martín	(Brazil) Ricardo Mello (Australia) Peter Luczak	(Spain) Santiago Ventura Bertomeu (Argentina) Agustín Calleri (Argentina) Mariano Zabaleta (Argentina) Edgardo Massa
14 Feb	Brasil Open; Bahia, Brazil; ATP International Series; Clay – $380,000 – 32S/16D; Singles – Doubles	(Czech Republic) František Čermák (Czech Republic) Leoš Friedl; 6–4, 6–4	(Argentina) José Acasuso (Argentina) Ignacio González King	(Brazil) Ricardo Mello (Australia) Peter Luczak	(Spain) Santiago Ventura Bertomeu (Argentina) Agustín Calleri (Argentina) Mariano Zabaleta (Argentina) Edgardo Massa
21 Feb	Dubai Tennis Championships; Dubai, United Arab Emirates; ATP International Series Gold; Hard – $1,000,000 – 32S/16D; Singles – Doubles	(Switzerland) Roger Federer; 6–1, 6–7^{(6–8)}, 6–3	(Croatia) Ivan Ljubičić	(United States) Andre Agassi (Spain) Tommy Robredo	(Russia) Mikhail Youzhny (Russia) Nikolay Davydenko (United Kingdom) Tim Henman (Germany) Nicolas Kiefer
21 Feb	Dubai Tennis Championships; Dubai, United Arab Emirates; ATP International Series Gold; Hard – $1,000,000 – 32S/16D; Singles – Doubles	(Czech Republic) Martin Damm (Czech Republic) Radek Štěpánek; 6–2, 6–4	(Sweden) Jonas Björkman (France) Fabrice Santoro	(United States) Andre Agassi (Spain) Tommy Robredo	(Russia) Mikhail Youzhny (Russia) Nikolay Davydenko (United Kingdom) Tim Henman (Germany) Nicolas Kiefer
21 Feb	Abierto Mexicano Telcel; Acapulco, Mexico; ATP International Series Gold; Clay – $643,000 – 32S/16D; Singles – Doubles	(Spain) Rafael Nadal; 6–1, 6–0	(Spain) Albert Montañés	(Argentina) Mariano Puerta (Argentina) Agustín Calleri	(Spain) Félix Mantilla (Argentina) Guillermo Cañas (Czech Republic) Jiří Novák (Italy) Filippo Volandri
21 Feb	Abierto Mexicano Telcel; Acapulco, Mexico; ATP International Series Gold; Clay – $643,000 – 32S/16D; Singles – Doubles	(Spain) David Ferrer (Spain) Santiago Ventura Bertomeu; 4–6, 6–1, 6–4	(Czech Republic) Jiří Vaněk (Czech Republic) Tomáš Zíb	(Argentina) Mariano Puerta (Argentina) Agustín Calleri	(Spain) Félix Mantilla (Argentina) Guillermo Cañas (Czech Republic) Jiří Novák (Italy) Filippo Volandri
21 Feb	Tennis Channel Open; Scottsdale, USA; ATP International Series; Hard – $380,000 – 32S/16D; Singles – Doubles	(Australia) Wayne Arthurs; 7–5, 6–3	(Croatia) Mario Ančić	(Belgium) Christophe Rochus (United States) Vincent Spadea	(Italy) Davide Sanguinetti (United States) Glenn Weiner (Ecuador) Giovanni Lapentti (United States) James Blake
21 Feb	Tennis Channel Open; Scottsdale, USA; ATP International Series; Hard – $380,000 – 32S/16D; Singles – Doubles	(United States) Bob Bryan (United States) Mike Bryan; 7–5, 6–4	(Australia) Wayne Arthurs (Australia) Paul Hanley	(Belgium) Christophe Rochus (United States) Vincent Spadea	(Italy) Davide Sanguinetti (United States) Glenn Weiner (Ecuador) Giovanni Lapentti (United States) James Blake
28 Feb	Davis Cup First Round; Bratislava, Slovakia – hard (i); Fribourg, Switzerland – hard (i); Sydney, Australia – grass Buenos Aires, Argentina – clay Moscow, Russia – carpet (i); Strasbourg, France – clay (i); Brașov, Romania – clay (i); Carson, California, United States – hard	First-round winners Slovakia 4–1; Netherlands 3–2; Australia 5–0; Argentina 5–0; Russia 4–1; France 3–2; Romania 3–2; Croatia 3–2	First-round losers Spain; Switzerland; Austria; Czech Republic; Chile; Sweden; Belarus; United States		

=== March ===
Week	Tournament	Champions	Runners-up	Semifinalists	Quarterfinalists
7 Mar; 14 Mar	Pacific Life Open; Indian Wells, USA; ATP Masters Series; Hard – $2,724,600 – 96S/32D; Singles – Doubles	(Switzerland) Roger Federer; 6–2, 6–4, 6–4	(Australia) Lleyton Hewitt	(Argentina) Guillermo Cañas (United States) Andy Roddick	(Germany) Nicolas Kiefer (United Kingdom) Tim Henman (Spain) Carlos Moyà (United States) Andre Agassi
7 Mar; 14 Mar	Pacific Life Open; Indian Wells, USA; ATP Masters Series; Hard – $2,724,600 – 96S/32D; Singles – Doubles	(The Bahamas) Mark Knowles (Canada) Daniel Nestor; 7–6^{(8–6)}, 7–6^{(7–2)}	(Australia) Wayne Arthurs (Australia) Paul Hanley	(Argentina) Guillermo Cañas (United States) Andy Roddick	(Germany) Nicolas Kiefer (United Kingdom) Tim Henman (Spain) Carlos Moyà (United States) Andre Agassi
21 Mar; 28 Mar	NASDAQ-100 Open; Key Biscayne, USA; ATP Masters Series; Hard – $3,200,000 – 96S/32D; Singles – Doubles	(Switzerland) Roger Federer; 2–6, 6–7^{(4–7)}, 7–6^{(7–5)}, 6–3, 6–1	(Spain) Rafael Nadal	(United States) Andre Agassi (Spain) David Ferrer	(United Kingdom) Tim Henman (United States) Taylor Dent (Slovakia) Dominik Hrbatý (Sweden) Thomas Johansson
21 Mar; 28 Mar	NASDAQ-100 Open; Key Biscayne, USA; ATP Masters Series; Hard – $3,200,000 – 96S/32D; Singles – Doubles	(Sweden) Jonas Björkman (Belarus) Max Mirnyi; 6–1 6–2	(Zimbabwe) Wayne Black (Zimbabwe) Kevin Ullyett	(United States) Andre Agassi (Spain) David Ferrer	(United Kingdom) Tim Henman (United States) Taylor Dent (Slovakia) Dominik Hrbatý (Sweden) Thomas Johansson

=== April ===
Week	Tournament	Champions	Runners-up	Semifinalists	Quarterfinalists
4 Apr	Open de Tenis Comunidad Valenciana; Valencia, Spain; ATP International Series; Clay – $375,000 – 32S/16D; Singles – Doubles	(Russia) Igor Andreev; 6–3, 5–7, 6–3	(Spain) David Ferrer	(Spain) Albert Costa (Spain) Iván Navarro	(Spain) Fernando Verdasco (Spain) Alberto Martín (Spain) Rafael Nadal (Chile) Fernando González
4 Apr	Open de Tenis Comunidad Valenciana; Valencia, Spain; ATP International Series; Clay – $375,000 – 32S/16D; Singles – Doubles	(Chile) Fernando González (Argentina) Martín Rodríguez; 6–4, 6–4	(Argentina) Lucas Arnold Ker (Argentina) Mariano Hood	(Spain) Albert Costa (Spain) Iván Navarro	(Spain) Fernando Verdasco (Spain) Alberto Martín (Spain) Rafael Nadal (Chile) Fernando González
4 Apr	Grand Prix Hassan II; Casablanca, Morocco; ATP International Series; Clay – $355,000 – 32S/16D; Singles – Doubles	(Argentina) Mariano Puerta; 6–4, 6–1	(Argentina) Juan Mónaco	(Czech Republic) Tomáš Zíb (Italy) Filippo Volandri	(Belgium) Christophe Rochus (France) Gilles Simon (France) Arnaud Clément (Luxembourg) Gilles Müller
4 Apr	Grand Prix Hassan II; Casablanca, Morocco; ATP International Series; Clay – $355,000 – 32S/16D; Singles – Doubles	(Czech Republic) František Čermák (Czech Republic) Leoš Friedl; 6–4, 6–3	(Argentina) Martin García (Peru) Luis Horna	(Czech Republic) Tomáš Zíb (Italy) Filippo Volandri	(Belgium) Christophe Rochus (France) Gilles Simon (France) Arnaud Clément (Luxembourg) Gilles Müller
11 Apr	Monte Carlo Masters; Roquebrune-Cap-Martin, France; ATP Masters Series; Clay – $2,200,000 – 64S/24D; Singles – Doubles	(Spain) Rafael Nadal; 6–3, 6–1, 0–6, 7–5	(Argentina) Guillermo Coria	(France) Richard Gasquet (Spain) Juan Carlos Ferrero	(Switzerland) Roger Federer (Argentina) Gastón Gaudio (Spain) David Ferrer (Italy) Filippo Volandri
11 Apr	Monte Carlo Masters; Roquebrune-Cap-Martin, France; ATP Masters Series; Clay – $2,200,000 – 64S/24D; Singles – Doubles	(India) Leander Paes (Serbia and Montenegro) Nenad Zimonjić; Walkover	(United States) Bob Bryan (United States) Mike Bryan	(France) Richard Gasquet (Spain) Juan Carlos Ferrero	(Switzerland) Roger Federer (Argentina) Gastón Gaudio (Spain) David Ferrer (Italy) Filippo Volandri
18 Apr	Torneo Godó; Barcelona, Spain; ATP International Series Gold; Clay – $900,000 – 56S/24D; Singles – Doubles	(Spain) Rafael Nadal; 6–1, 7–6, 6–3	(Spain) Juan Carlos Ferrero	(Czech Republic) Radek Štěpánek (Russia) Nikolay Davydenko	(Switzerland) Stanislas Wawrinka (Argentina) Agustín Calleri (Belarus) Max Mirnyi (Argentina) Gastón Gaudio
18 Apr	Torneo Godó; Barcelona, Spain; ATP International Series Gold; Clay – $900,000 – 56S/24D; Singles – Doubles	(India) Leander Paes (Serbia and Montenegro) Nenad Zimonjić; 6–3, 6–3	(Spain) Feliciano López (Spain) Rafael Nadal	(Czech Republic) Radek Štěpánek (Russia) Nikolay Davydenko	(Switzerland) Stanislas Wawrinka (Argentina) Agustín Calleri (Belarus) Max Mirnyi (Argentina) Gastón Gaudio
18 Apr	U.S. Men's Clay Court Championships; Houston, Texas, USA; ATP International Series; Clay – $355,000 – 32S/16D; Singles – Doubles	(United States) Andy Roddick; 6–2, 6–2	(France) Sébastien Grosjean	(Austria) Jürgen Melzer (Ecuador) Nicolás Lapentti	(Peru) Luis Horna (Germany) Tommy Haas (United States) James Blake (United States) Andre Agassi
18 Apr	U.S. Men's Clay Court Championships; Houston, Texas, USA; ATP International Series; Clay – $355,000 – 32S/16D; Singles – Doubles	(The Bahamas) Mark Knowles (Canada) Daniel Nestor; 6–3, 6–4	(Argentina) Martín García (Peru) Luis Horna	(Austria) Jürgen Melzer (Ecuador) Nicolás Lapentti	(Peru) Luis Horna (Germany) Tommy Haas (United States) James Blake (United States) Andre Agassi
25 Apr	Estoril Open; Oeiras, Portugal; ATP International Series; Clay – $625,000; Singles – Doubles	(Argentina) Gastón Gaudio; 6–1, 2–6, 6–1	(Spain) Tommy Robredo	(Spain) Carlos Moyà (Spain) Guillermo García-López	(France) Paul-Henri Mathieu (Italy) Davide Sanguinetti (Costa Rica) Juan Antonio Marín (Spain) Feliciano López
25 Apr	Estoril Open; Oeiras, Portugal; ATP International Series; Clay – $625,000; Singles – Doubles	(Czech Republic) František Čermák (Czech Republic) Leoš Friedl; 6–3, 6–4	(Argentina) Juan Ignacio Chela (Spain) Tommy Robredo	(Spain) Carlos Moyà (Spain) Guillermo García-López	(France) Paul-Henri Mathieu (Italy) Davide Sanguinetti (Costa Rica) Juan Antonio Marín (Spain) Feliciano López
25 Apr	BMW Open; Munich, Germany; ATP International Series; Clay – $380,000; Singles – Doubles	(Argentina) David Nalbandian; 6–4, 6–1	(Romania) Andrei Pavel	(Finland) Jarkko Nieminen (Germany) Tommy Haas	(Argentina) Juan Mónaco (Slovakia) Michal Mertiňák (Australia) Wayne Arthurs (Netherlands) Raemon Sluiter
25 Apr	BMW Open; Munich, Germany; ATP International Series; Clay – $380,000; Singles – Doubles	(Croatia) Mario Ančić (Austria) Julian Knowle; 6–3, 1–6, 6–3	(Germany) Florian Mayer (Germany) Alexander Waske	(Finland) Jarkko Nieminen (Germany) Tommy Haas	(Argentina) Juan Mónaco (Slovakia) Michal Mertiňák (Australia) Wayne Arthurs (Netherlands) Raemon Sluiter

=== May ===
Week	Tournament	Champions	Runners-up	Semifinalists	Quarterfinalists
2 May	Internazionali BNL d'Italia; Rome, Italy; ATP Masters Series; Clay – $2,200,000 – 64S/24D; Singles – Doubles	(Spain) Rafael Nadal; 6–4, 3–6, 6–3, 4–6, 7–6^{(8–6)}	(Argentina) Guillermo Coria	(United States) Andre Agassi (Spain) David Ferrer	(Spain) Fernando Verdasco (Slovakia) Dominik Hrbatý (Spain) Alberto Martín (Czech Republic) Radek Štěpánek
2 May	Internazionali BNL d'Italia; Rome, Italy; ATP Masters Series; Clay – $2,200,000 – 64S/24D; Singles – Doubles	(France) Michaël Llodra (France) Fabrice Santoro; 6–4 6–2	(United States) Bob Bryan (United States) Mike Bryan	(United States) Andre Agassi (Spain) David Ferrer	(Spain) Fernando Verdasco (Slovakia) Dominik Hrbatý (Spain) Alberto Martín (Czech Republic) Radek Štěpánek
9 May	Hamburg Masters; Hamburg, Germany; ATP Masters Series; Clay – $2,200,000 – 64S/24D; Singles – Doubles	(Switzerland) Roger Federer; 6–3, 7–5, 7–6^{(7–4)}	(France) Richard Gasquet	(Russia) Nikolay Davydenko (Belgium) Christophe Rochus	(Argentina) Guillermo Coria (Italy) Filippo Volandri (Argentina) Juan Ignacio Chela (Italy) Andreas Seppi
9 May	Hamburg Masters; Hamburg, Germany; ATP Masters Series; Clay – $2,200,000 – 64S/24D; Singles – Doubles	(Sweden) Jonas Björkman (Belarus) Max Mirnyi; 4–6, 7–6^{(7–2)}, 7–6^{(7–3)}	(France) Michaël Llodra (France) Fabrice Santoro	(Russia) Nikolay Davydenko (Belgium) Christophe Rochus	(Argentina) Guillermo Coria (Italy) Filippo Volandri (Argentina) Juan Ignacio Chela (Italy) Andreas Seppi
16 May	International Raiffeisen Grand Prix; St. Pölten, Austria; ATP International Series; Clay – $380,000	(Russia) Nikolay Davydenko; 6–3, 2–6, 6–4	(Austria) Jürgen Melzer	(Argentina) José Acasuso (Belgium) Christophe Rochus	(Spain) Félix Mantilla (Germany) Michael Kohlmann (Spain) David Sánchez (Spain) Guillermo García-López
16 May	International Raiffeisen Grand Prix; St. Pölten, Austria; ATP International Series; Clay – $380,000	(Argentina) Lucas Arnold Ker (Australia) Paul Hanley; 6–3, 6–4	(Czech Republic) Martin Damm (Argentina) Mariano Hood	(Argentina) José Acasuso (Belgium) Christophe Rochus	(Spain) Félix Mantilla (Germany) Michael Kohlmann (Spain) David Sánchez (Spain) Guillermo García-López
16 May	ARAG ATP World Team Championship; Düsseldorf, Germany; World Team Cup; Clay – $1,500,000	Germany; 2–1	Argentina	Round Robin (Red Group) Czech Republic; Chile; France	Round Robin (Blue Group) United States; Spain; Sweden
23 May; 30 May	French Open; Paris, France; Grand Slam; Clay – $7,992,394; 128S/64D/32X; Singles – Doubles – Mixed doubles	(Spain) Rafael Nadal; 6–7^{(6–8)}, 6–3, 6–1, 7–5	(Argentina) Mariano Puerta	(Switzerland) Roger Federer (Russia) Nikolay Davydenko	(Romania) Victor Hănescu (Spain) David Ferrer (Spain) Tommy Robredo (Argentina) Guillermo Cañas
23 May; 30 May	French Open; Paris, France; Grand Slam; Clay – $7,992,394; 128S/64D/32X; Singles – Doubles – Mixed doubles	(Sweden) Jonas Björkman (Belarus) Max Mirnyi; 2–6, 6–1, 6–4	(United States) Bob Bryan (United States) Mike Bryan	(Switzerland) Roger Federer (Russia) Nikolay Davydenko	(Romania) Victor Hănescu (Spain) David Ferrer (Spain) Tommy Robredo (Argentina) Guillermo Cañas
23 May; 30 May	French Open; Paris, France; Grand Slam; Clay – $7,992,394; 128S/64D/32X; Singles – Doubles – Mixed doubles	(Slovakia) Daniela Hantuchová (France) Fabrice Santoro; 3–6, 6–3, 6–2	(United States) Martina Navratilova (India) Leander Paes	(Switzerland) Roger Federer (Russia) Nikolay Davydenko	(Romania) Victor Hănescu (Spain) David Ferrer (Spain) Tommy Robredo (Argentina) Guillermo Cañas

=== June ===
Week	Tournament	Champions	Runners-up	Semifinalists	Quarterfinalists
6 Jun	Stella Artois Championships; London, United Kingdom; ATP International Series; Grass – $800,000; Singles – Doubles	(United States) Andy Roddick; 7–6^{(9–7)}, 7–6^{(7–4)}	(Croatia) Ivo Karlović	(Sweden) Thomas Johansson (Czech Republic) Radek Štěpánek	(Australia) Lleyton Hewitt (United Kingdom) Tim Henman (France) Richard Gasquet (France) Sébastien Grosjean
6 Jun	Stella Artois Championships; London, United Kingdom; ATP International Series; Grass – $800,000; Singles – Doubles	(United States) Bob Bryan (United States) Mike Bryan; 7–6^{(11–9)}, 7–6^{(7–4)}	(Sweden) Jonas Björkman (Belarus) Max Mirnyi	(Sweden) Thomas Johansson (Czech Republic) Radek Štěpánek	(Australia) Lleyton Hewitt (United Kingdom) Tim Henman (France) Richard Gasquet (France) Sébastien Grosjean
6 Jun	Gerry Weber Open; Halle, North Rhine-Westphalia, Germany; ATP International Series; Grass – $800,000; Singles – Doubles	(Switzerland) Roger Federer; 6–4, 6–7^{(6–8)}, 6–4	(Russia) Marat Safin	(Germany) Tommy Haas (Argentina) Guillermo Cañas	(Germany) Philipp Kohlschreiber (Spain) Juan Carlos Ferrero (Germany) Rainer Schüttler (Belgium) Olivier Rochus
6 Jun	Gerry Weber Open; Halle, North Rhine-Westphalia, Germany; ATP International Series; Grass – $800,000; Singles – Doubles	(Switzerland) Roger Federer (Switzerland) Yves Allegro; 7–5, 6–7^{(6–8)}, 6–3	(Sweden) Joachim Johansson (Russia) Marat Safin	(Germany) Tommy Haas (Argentina) Guillermo Cañas	(Germany) Philipp Kohlschreiber (Spain) Juan Carlos Ferrero (Germany) Rainer Schüttler (Belgium) Olivier Rochus
13 Jun	Nottingham Open; Nottingham, United Kingdom; ATP International Series; Grass – $380,000; Singles – Doubles	(France) Richard Gasquet; 6–2, 6–3	(Belarus) Max Mirnyi	(Belgium) Olivier Rochus (United States) Taylor Dent	(Croatia) Ivo Karlović (Denmark) Kenneth Carlsen (Thailand) Paradorn Srichaphan (Sweden) Thomas Johansson
13 Jun	Nottingham Open; Nottingham, United Kingdom; ATP International Series; Grass – $380,000; Singles – Doubles	(Israel) Andy Ram (Israel) Jonathan Erlich; 4–6, 6–3, 7–5	(Sweden) Simon Aspelin (Australia) Todd Perry	(Belgium) Olivier Rochus (United States) Taylor Dent	(Croatia) Ivo Karlović (Denmark) Kenneth Carlsen (Thailand) Paradorn Srichaphan (Sweden) Thomas Johansson
13 Jun	Ordina Open 's-Hertogenbosch, Netherlands; ATP International Series; Grass – $380,000; Singles – Doubles	(Croatia) Mario Ančić; 7–5, 6–4	(France) Michaël Llodra	(Australia) Mark Philippoussis (Czech Republic) Jan Hernych	(Germany) Lars Burgsmüller (Italy) Davide Sanguinetti (Sweden) Jonas Björkman (Germany) Philipp Kohlschreiber
13 Jun	Ordina Open 's-Hertogenbosch, Netherlands; ATP International Series; Grass – $380,000; Singles – Doubles	(Czech Republic) Cyril Suk (Czech Republic) Pavel Vízner; 6–3, 6–4	(Czech Republic) Tomáš Cibulec (Czech Republic) Leoš Friedl	(Australia) Mark Philippoussis (Czech Republic) Jan Hernych	(Germany) Lars Burgsmüller (Italy) Davide Sanguinetti (Sweden) Jonas Björkman (Germany) Philipp Kohlschreiber
20 Jun; 27 Jun	Wimbledon Championships; London, United Kingdom; Grand Slam; Grass – $8,616,793; 128S/64D/48X; Singles – Doubles – Mixed doubles	(Switzerland) Roger Federer; 6–2, 7–6^{(7–2)}, 6–4	(United States) Andy Roddick	(Australia) Lleyton Hewitt (Sweden) Thomas Johansson	(Chile) Fernando González (Spain) Feliciano López (Argentina) David Nalbandian (France) Sébastien Grosjean
20 Jun; 27 Jun	Wimbledon Championships; London, United Kingdom; Grand Slam; Grass – $8,616,793; 128S/64D/48X; Singles – Doubles – Mixed doubles	(Australia) Stephen Huss (South Africa) Wesley Moodie; 7–6^{(7–4)}, 6–3, 6–7^{(2–7)}, 6–3	(United States) Bob Bryan (United States) Mike Bryan	(Australia) Lleyton Hewitt (Sweden) Thomas Johansson	(Chile) Fernando González (Spain) Feliciano López (Argentina) David Nalbandian (France) Sébastien Grosjean
20 Jun; 27 Jun	Wimbledon Championships; London, United Kingdom; Grand Slam; Grass – $8,616,793; 128S/64D/48X; Singles – Doubles – Mixed doubles	(France) Mary Pierce (India) Mahesh Bhupathi; 6–4, 6–2	(Ukraine) Tatiana Perebiynis (Australia) Paul Hanley	(Australia) Lleyton Hewitt (Sweden) Thomas Johansson	(Chile) Fernando González (Spain) Feliciano López (Argentina) David Nalbandian (France) Sébastien Grosjean

=== July ===
Week	Tournament	Champions	Runners-up	Semifinalists	Quarterfinalists
4 Jul	Campbell's Hall of Fame Tennis Championships; Newport, USA; ATP International Series; Grass – $380,000; Singles – Doubles	(United Kingdom) Greg Rusedski; 7–6^{(7–3)}, 2–6, 6–4	(United States) Vince Spadea	(South Africa) Wesley Moodie (United States) Paul Goldstein	(Slovakia) Michal Mertiňák (France) Antony Dupuis (Germany) Alexander Waske (Serbia and Montenegro) Dušan Vemić
4 Jul	Campbell's Hall of Fame Tennis Championships; Newport, USA; ATP International Series; Grass – $380,000; Singles – Doubles	(Australia) Jordan Kerr (United States) Jim Thomas; 7–6^{(7–5)} 7–6^{(7–5)}	(United States) Graydon Oliver (United States) Travis Parrott	(South Africa) Wesley Moodie (United States) Paul Goldstein	(Slovakia) Michal Mertiňák (France) Antony Dupuis (Germany) Alexander Waske (Serbia and Montenegro) Dušan Vemić
4 Jul	Allianz Suisse Open Gstaad; Gstaad, Switzerland; ATP International Series; Clay – $495,000; Singles – Doubles	(Argentina) Gastón Gaudio; 6–4, 6–4	(Switzerland) Stanislas Wawrinka	(Romania) Răzvan Sabău (Chile) Nicolás Massú	(Italy) Potito Starace (Czech Republic) František Čermák (Peru) Luis Horna (Italy) Andreas Seppi
4 Jul	Allianz Suisse Open Gstaad; Gstaad, Switzerland; ATP International Series; Clay – $495,000; Singles – Doubles	(Czech Republic) František Čermák (Czech Republic) Leoš Friedl; 7–6^{(8–6)}, 7–6^{(13–11)}	(Germany) Michael Kohlmann (Germany) Rainer Schüttler	(Romania) Răzvan Sabău (Chile) Nicolás Massú	(Italy) Potito Starace (Czech Republic) František Čermák (Peru) Luis Horna (Italy) Andreas Seppi
4 Jul	Synsam Swedish Open; Båstad, Sweden; ATP International Series; Clay – $380,000; Singles – Doubles	(Spain) Rafael Nadal; 2–6, 6–2, 6–4	(Czech Republic) Tomáš Berdych	(Spain) Tommy Robredo (Czech Republic) Jiří Vaněk	(Spain) Juan Carlos Ferrero (Russia) Mikhail Youzhny (Spain) Óscar Hernández (Argentina) Mariano Zabaleta
4 Jul	Synsam Swedish Open; Båstad, Sweden; ATP International Series; Clay – $380,000; Singles – Doubles	(Sweden) Jonas Björkman (Sweden) Joachim Johansson; 6–2, 6–3	(Argentina) José Acasuso (Argentina) Sebastián Prieto	(Spain) Tommy Robredo (Czech Republic) Jiří Vaněk	(Spain) Juan Carlos Ferrero (Russia) Mikhail Youzhny (Spain) Óscar Hernández (Argentina) Mariano Zabaleta
11 Jul	Davis Cup Quarterfinals; Bratislava, Slovakia – hard (i); Sydney, Australia – grass Moscow, Russia – clay (i); Split, Croatia – carpet (i)	Quarterfinals winners Slovakia 4–1; Argentina 4–1; Russia 3–2; Croatia 4–1	Quarterfinals losers Netherlands; Australia; France; Romania		
18 Jul	Mercedes Cup; Stuttgart, Germany; ATP International Series Gold; Clay – $719,000; Singles – Doubles	(Spain) Rafael Nadal; 6–3, 6–3, 6–4	(Argentina) Gastón Gaudio	(Finland) Jarkko Nieminen (Russia) Nikolay Davydenko	(Czech Republic) Tomáš Zíb (Italy) Andreas Seppi (Argentina) Mariano Zabaleta (Czech Republic) Tomáš Berdych
18 Jul	Mercedes Cup; Stuttgart, Germany; ATP International Series Gold; Clay – $719,000; Singles – Doubles	(Argentina) José Acasuso (Argentina) Sebastián Prieto; 7–6^{(7–4)}, 6–3	(Argentina) Mariano Hood (Spain) Tommy Robredo	(Finland) Jarkko Nieminen (Russia) Nikolay Davydenko	(Czech Republic) Tomáš Zíb (Italy) Andreas Seppi (Argentina) Mariano Zabaleta (Czech Republic) Tomáš Berdych
18 Jul	Dutch Open; Amersfoort, Netherlands; ATP International Series; Clay – $380,000; Singles – Doubles	(Chile) Fernando González; 7–5, 6–3	(Argentina) Agustín Calleri	(Czech Republic) Ivo Minář (Spain) David Sánchez	(Argentina) Mariano Puerta (Netherlands) Melle Van Gemerden (Chile) Nicolás Massú (Italy) Daniele Bracciali
18 Jul	Dutch Open; Amersfoort, Netherlands; ATP International Series; Clay – $380,000; Singles – Doubles	(Argentina) Martín García (Peru) Luis Horna; 6–4, 6–4	(Chile) Fernando González (Chile) Nicolás Massú	(Czech Republic) Ivo Minář (Spain) David Sánchez	(Argentina) Mariano Puerta (Netherlands) Melle Van Gemerden (Chile) Nicolás Massú (Italy) Daniele Bracciali
18 Jul	RCA Championships; Indianapolis, Indiana, USA; ATP International Series; Hard – $600,000; Singles – Doubles	(United States) Robby Ginepri; 4–6, 6–3, 3–0 ret.	(United States) Taylor Dent	(Slovakia) Karol Beck (United Kingdom) Greg Rusedski	(United States) Andy Roddick (Switzerland) George Bastl (United States) Paul Goldstein (Germany) Nicolas Kiefer
18 Jul	RCA Championships; Indianapolis, Indiana, USA; ATP International Series; Hard – $600,000; Singles – Doubles	(Australia) Paul Hanley (United States) Graydon Oliver; 6–2, 3-1 ret.	(Sweden) Simon Aspelin (Australia) Todd Perry	(Slovakia) Karol Beck (United Kingdom) Greg Rusedski	(United States) Andy Roddick (Switzerland) George Bastl (United States) Paul Goldstein (Germany) Nicolas Kiefer
25 Jul	Generali Open; Kitzbühel, Austria; ATP International Series Gold; Clay – $760,000; Singles – Doubles	(Argentina) Gastón Gaudio; 2–6, 6–2, 6–4, 6–4	(Spain) Fernando Verdasco	(Argentina) Mariano Zabaleta (Chile) Nicolás Massú	(Spain) Feliciano López (Russia) Mikhail Youzhny (Ecuador) Nicolás Lapentti (Romania) Victor Hănescu
25 Jul	Generali Open; Kitzbühel, Austria; ATP International Series Gold; Clay – $760,000; Singles – Doubles	(Czech Republic) Leoš Friedl (Romania) Andrei Pavel; 6–2, 6–7^{(5–7)}, 6–0	(Belgium) Christophe Rochus (Belgium) Olivier Rochus	(Argentina) Mariano Zabaleta (Chile) Nicolás Massú	(Spain) Feliciano López (Russia) Mikhail Youzhny (Ecuador) Nicolás Lapentti (Romania) Victor Hănescu
25 Jul	Mercedes-Benz Cup; Los Angeles, USA; ATP International Series; Hard – $380,000; Singles – Doubles	(United States) Andre Agassi; 6–4, 7–5	(Luxembourg) Gilles Müller	(Argentina) Juan Ignacio Chela (Slovakia) Dominik Hrbatý	(Thailand) Paradorn Srichaphan (Belgium) Xavier Malisse (United States) Robby Ginepri (Brazil) Ricardo Mello
25 Jul	Mercedes-Benz Cup; Los Angeles, USA; ATP International Series; Hard – $380,000; Singles – Doubles	(United States) Brian MacPhie (United States) Rick Leach; 6–3, 6–4	(Israel) Jonathan Erlich (Israel) Andy Ram	(Argentina) Juan Ignacio Chela (Slovakia) Dominik Hrbatý	(Thailand) Paradorn Srichaphan (Belgium) Xavier Malisse (United States) Robby Ginepri (Brazil) Ricardo Mello
25 Jul	Croatia Open Umag; Umag, Croatia; ATP International Series; Clay – $400,000; Singles – Doubles	(Argentina) Guillermo Coria; 6–2, 4–6, 6–2	(Spain) Carlos Moyà	(Czech Republic) Jiří Novák (Italy) Filippo Volandri	(Czech Republic) Lukáš Dlouhý (Spain) David Ferrer (Spain) Tommy Robredo (Spain) Juan Carlos Ferrero
25 Jul	Croatia Open Umag; Umag, Croatia; ATP International Series; Clay – $400,000; Singles – Doubles	(Czech Republic) Jiří Novák (Czech Republic) Petr Pála; 6–3, 6–3	(Slovakia) Michal Mertiňák (Czech Republic) David Škoch	(Czech Republic) Jiří Novák (Italy) Filippo Volandri	(Czech Republic) Lukáš Dlouhý (Spain) David Ferrer (Spain) Tommy Robredo (Spain) Juan Carlos Ferrero

=== August ===
Week	Tournament	Champions	Runners-up	Semifinalists	Quarterfinalists
1 Aug	Orange Prokom Open; Sopot, Poland; ATP International Series; Clay – $500,000; Singles – Doubles	(France) Gaël Monfils; 7–6^{(8–6)}, 4–6, 7–5	(Germany) Florian Mayer	(Argentina) Guillermo Coria (Italy) Potito Starace	(Finland) Jarkko Nieminen (Russia) Igor Andreev (Argentina) José Acasuso (Romania) Victor Hănescu
1 Aug	Orange Prokom Open; Sopot, Poland; ATP International Series; Clay – $500,000; Singles – Doubles	(Poland) Mariusz Fyrstenberg (Poland) Marcin Matkowski; 7–6^{(9–7)}, 6–4	(Argentina) Lucas Arnold Ker (Argentina) Sebastián Prieto	(Argentina) Guillermo Coria (Italy) Potito Starace	(Finland) Jarkko Nieminen (Russia) Igor Andreev (Argentina) José Acasuso (Romania) Victor Hănescu
1 Aug	Legg Mason Tennis Classic; Washington, D.C., USA; ATP International Series; Hard – $600,000; Singles – Doubles	(United States) Andy Roddick; 7–5, 6–3	(United States) James Blake	(Thailand) Paradorn Srichaphan (Czech Republic) Tomáš Berdych	(Croatia) Ivo Karlović (Peru) Luis Horna (France) Arnaud Clément (United States) Bobby Reynolds
1 Aug	Legg Mason Tennis Classic; Washington, D.C., USA; ATP International Series; Hard – $600,000; Singles – Doubles	(United States) Bob Bryan (United States) Mike Bryan; 7–5, 6–3	(Zimbabwe) Wayne Black (Zimbabwe) Kevin Ullyett	(Thailand) Paradorn Srichaphan (Czech Republic) Tomáš Berdych	(Croatia) Ivo Karlović (Peru) Luis Horna (France) Arnaud Clément (United States) Bobby Reynolds
8 Aug	Rogers Cup; Montreal, Canada; ATP Masters Series; Hard – $2,200,000; Singles – Doubles	(Spain) Rafael Nadal; 6–3, 4–6, 6–2	(United States) Andre Agassi	(France) Paul-Henri Mathieu (United Kingdom) Greg Rusedski	(Argentina) Mariano Puerta (Slovakia) Karol Beck (Argentina) Gastón Gaudio (Slovakia) Dominik Hrbatý
8 Aug	Rogers Cup; Montreal, Canada; ATP Masters Series; Hard – $2,200,000; Singles – Doubles	(Zimbabwe) Wayne Black (Zimbabwe) Kevin Ullyett; 6–7^{(5–7)}, 6–3, 6–0	(Israel) Jonathan Erlich (Israel) Andy Ram	(France) Paul-Henri Mathieu (United Kingdom) Greg Rusedski	(Argentina) Mariano Puerta (Slovakia) Karol Beck (Argentina) Gastón Gaudio (Slovakia) Dominik Hrbatý
15 Aug	Western & Southern Financial Group Masters; Mason, USA; ATP Masters Series; Hard – $2,200,000; Singles – Doubles	(Switzerland) Roger Federer; 6–3, 7–5	(United States) Andy Roddick	(United States) Robby Ginepri (Australia) Lleyton Hewitt	(Argentina) José Acasuso (Russia) Marat Safin (Russia) Nikolay Davydenko (Russia) Mikhail Youzhny
15 Aug	Western & Southern Financial Group Masters; Mason, USA; ATP Masters Series; Hard – $2,200,000; Singles – Doubles	(Sweden) Jonas Björkman (Belarus) Max Mirnyi; 6–4, 5–7, 6–2	(Zimbabwe) Wayne Black (Zimbabwe) Kevin Ullyett	(United States) Robby Ginepri (Australia) Lleyton Hewitt	(Argentina) José Acasuso (Russia) Marat Safin (Russia) Nikolay Davydenko (Russia) Mikhail Youzhny
22 Aug	Pilot Pen Tennis; New Haven, USA; ATP International Series; Hard – $675,000; Singles – Doubles	(United States) James Blake; 3–6, 7–5, 6–1	(Spain) Feliciano López	(Romania) Victor Hănescu (Spain) David Ferrer	(Argentina) Juan Ignacio Chela (Spain) Tommy Robredo (Russia) Igor Andreev (Spain) Fernando Verdasco
22 Aug	Pilot Pen Tennis; New Haven, USA; ATP International Series; Hard – $675,000; Singles – Doubles	(Argentina) Gastón Etlis (Argentina) Martín Rodríguez; 6–4, 6–3	(United States) Rajeev Ram (United States) Bobby Reynolds	(Romania) Victor Hănescu (Spain) David Ferrer	(Argentina) Juan Ignacio Chela (Spain) Tommy Robredo (Russia) Igor Andreev (Spain) Fernando Verdasco
29 Aug; 5 Sep	US Open; New York, United States; Grand Slam; Hard – $7,950,000; 128S/64D/32X; Singles – Doubles – Mixed doubles	(Switzerland) Roger Federer; 6–3, 2–6, 7–6^{(7–1)}, 6–1	(United States) Andre Agassi	(Australia) Lleyton Hewitt (United States) Robby Ginepri	(Argentina) David Nalbandian (Finland) Jarkko Nieminen (Argentina) Guillermo Coria (United States) James Blake
29 Aug; 5 Sep	US Open; New York, United States; Grand Slam; Hard – $7,950,000; 128S/64D/32X; Singles – Doubles – Mixed doubles	(United States) Bob Bryan (United States) Mike Bryan; 6–1, 6–4	(Sweden) Jonas Björkman (Belarus) Max Mirnyi	(Australia) Lleyton Hewitt (United States) Robby Ginepri	(Argentina) David Nalbandian (Finland) Jarkko Nieminen (Argentina) Guillermo Coria (United States) James Blake
29 Aug; 5 Sep	US Open; New York, United States; Grand Slam; Hard – $7,950,000; 128S/64D/32X; Singles – Doubles – Mixed doubles	(Slovakia) Daniela Hantuchová (India) Mahesh Bhupathi; 6–4, 6–2	(Slovenia) Katarina Srebotnik (Serbia and Montenegro) Nenad Zimonjić	(Australia) Lleyton Hewitt (United States) Robby Ginepri	(Argentina) David Nalbandian (Finland) Jarkko Nieminen (Argentina) Guillermo Coria (United States) James Blake

=== September ===
Week	Tournament	Champions	Runners-up	Semifinalists	Quarterfinalists
12 Sep	China Open; Beijing, China; ATP International Series; Hard – $500,000; Singles – Doubles	(Spain) Rafael Nadal; 5–7, 6–1, 6–2	(Argentina) Guillermo Coria	(Spain) Juan Carlos Ferrero (Sweden) Thomas Johansson	(Netherlands) Peter Wessels (Argentina) David Nalbandian (Spain) Carlos Moyà (Russia) Mikhail Youzhny
12 Sep	China Open; Beijing, China; ATP International Series; Hard – $500,000; Singles – Doubles	(United States) Justin Gimelstob (Australia) Nathan Healey; 4–6, 6–3, 6–2	(Russia) Dmitry Tursunov (Russia) Mikhail Youzhny	(Spain) Juan Carlos Ferrero (Sweden) Thomas Johansson	(Netherlands) Peter Wessels (Argentina) David Nalbandian (Spain) Carlos Moyà (Russia) Mikhail Youzhny
12 Sep	BCR Open Romania; Bucharest, Romania; ATP International Series; Clay – $380,000; Singles – Doubles	(France) Florent Serra; 6–3, 6–4	(Russia) Igor Andreev	(Romania) Victor Hănescu (Romania) Andrei Pavel	(Argentina) Mariano Puerta (Spain) Rubén Ramírez Hidalgo (Germany) Florian Mayer (France) Paul-Henri Mathieu
12 Sep	BCR Open Romania; Bucharest, Romania; ATP International Series; Clay – $380,000; Singles – Doubles	(Argentina) José Acasuso (Argentina) Sebastián Prieto; 6–3, 4–6, 6–3	(Romania) Victor Hănescu (Romania) Andrei Pavel	(Romania) Victor Hănescu (Romania) Andrei Pavel	(Argentina) Mariano Puerta (Spain) Rubén Ramírez Hidalgo (Germany) Florian Mayer (France) Paul-Henri Mathieu
19 Sep	Davis Cup Semifinals; Bratislava, Slovakia – hard (i); Split, Croatia – carpet (i)	Semifinals winners Slovakia 4–1; Croatia 3–2	Semifinals losers Argentina; Russia		
26 Sep	PTT Thailand Open; Bangkok, Thailand; ATP International Series; Hard (i) – $550,000; Singles – Doubles	(Switzerland) Roger Federer; 6–3, 7–5	(United Kingdom) Andy Murray	(Finland) Jarkko Nieminen (Thailand) Paradorn Srichaphan	(Luxembourg) Gilles Müller (Chinese Taipei) Yeu-Tzuoo Wang (United States) Robby Ginepri (Australia) Lleyton Hewitt
26 Sep	PTT Thailand Open; Bangkok, Thailand; ATP International Series; Hard (i) – $550,000; Singles – Doubles	(Australia) Paul Hanley (India) Leander Paes; 6–7^{(5–7)}, 6–1, 6–2	(Israel) Jonathan Erlich (Israel) Andy Ram	(Finland) Jarkko Nieminen (Thailand) Paradorn Srichaphan	(Luxembourg) Gilles Müller (Chinese Taipei) Yeu-Tzuoo Wang (United States) Robby Ginepri (Australia) Lleyton Hewitt
26 Sep	Vietnam Open; Ho Chi Minh City, Vietnam; ATP International Series; Carpet (i) – $380,000; Singles – Doubles	(Sweden) Jonas Björkman; 6–3, 7–6^{(7–4)}	(Czech Republic) Radek Štěpánek	(Argentina) Mariano Puerta (Sweden) Thomas Johansson	(Germany) Rainer Schüttler (Germany) Alexander Waske (Argentina) Juan Mónaco (France) Cyril Saulnier
26 Sep	Vietnam Open; Ho Chi Minh City, Vietnam; ATP International Series; Carpet (i) – $380,000; Singles – Doubles	(Germany) Lars Burgsmüller (Germany) Philipp Kohlschreiber; 5–6^{(3–7)}, 6–4, 6–2	(Australia) Ashley Fisher (Sweden) Robert Lindstedt	(Argentina) Mariano Puerta (Sweden) Thomas Johansson	(Germany) Rainer Schüttler (Germany) Alexander Waske (Argentina) Juan Mónaco (France) Cyril Saulnier
26 Sep	Campionati Internazionali di Sicilia; Palermo, Italy; ATP International Series; Clay – $380,000; Singles – Doubles	(Russia) Igor Andreev; 0–6, 6–1, 6–3	(Italy) Filippo Volandri	(Italy) Andreas Seppi (Germany) Tomas Behrend	(Spain) Alberto Martín (Italy) Davide Sanguinetti (Spain) Juan Carlos Ferrero (Spain) Tommy Robredo
26 Sep	Campionati Internazionali di Sicilia; Palermo, Italy; ATP International Series; Clay – $380,000; Singles – Doubles	(Argentina) Martín García (Argentina) Mariano Hood; 6–2, 6–3	(Poland) Mariusz Fyrstenberg (Poland) Marcin Matkowski	(Italy) Andreas Seppi (Germany) Tomas Behrend	(Spain) Alberto Martín (Italy) Davide Sanguinetti (Spain) Juan Carlos Ferrero (Spain) Tommy Robredo

=== October ===
Week	Tournament	Champions	Runners-up	Semifinalists	Quarterfinalists
3 Oct	AIG Japan Open Tennis Championships; Tokyo, Japan; ATP International Series Gold; Hard – $765,000; Singles – Doubles	(South Africa) Wesley Moodie; 1–6, 7–6^{(9–7)}, 6–4	(Croatia) Mario Ančić	(Germany) Björn Phau (Finland) Jarkko Nieminen	(Cyprus) Marcos Baghdatis (United States) Robby Ginepri (United States) Taylor Dent (Czech Republic) Radek Štěpánek
3 Oct	AIG Japan Open Tennis Championships; Tokyo, Japan; ATP International Series Gold; Hard – $765,000; Singles – Doubles	(Japan) Takao Suzuki (Japan) Satoshi Iwabuchi; 5–4^{(7–3)}, 5–4^{(15–13)}	(Sweden) Simon Aspelin (Australia) Todd Perry	(Germany) Björn Phau (Finland) Jarkko Nieminen	(Cyprus) Marcos Baghdatis (United States) Robby Ginepri (United States) Taylor Dent (Czech Republic) Radek Štěpánek
3 Oct	Open de Moselle; Metz, France; ATP International Series; Hard (i) – $380,000; Singles – Doubles	(Croatia) Ivan Ljubičić; 7–6^{(9–7)}, 6–0	(France) Gaël Monfils	(Russia) Nikolay Davydenko (Slovakia) Dominik Hrbatý	(Italy) Andreas Seppi (Sweden) Robin Söderling (Australia) Mark Philippoussis (France) Richard Gasquet
3 Oct	Open de Moselle; Metz, France; ATP International Series; Hard (i) – $380,000; Singles – Doubles	(France) Michaël Llodra (France) Fabrice Santoro; 5–2, 3–5, 5–4^{(7–4)}	(Argentina) José Acasuso (Argentina) Sebastián Prieto	(Russia) Nikolay Davydenko (Slovakia) Dominik Hrbatý	(Italy) Andreas Seppi (Sweden) Robin Söderling (Australia) Mark Philippoussis (France) Richard Gasquet
10 Oct	BA-CA Tennis Trophy; Vienna, Austria; ATP International Series Gold; Hard (i) – $689,000; Singles – Doubles	(Croatia) Ivan Ljubičić; 6–2, 6–4, 7–6^{(7–5)}	(Spain) Juan Carlos Ferrero	(Czech Republic) Radek Štěpánek (Spain) Tommy Robredo	(Argentina) David Nalbandian (Spain) Feliciano López (Chile) Fernando González (Monaco) Jean-René Lisnard
10 Oct	BA-CA Tennis Trophy; Vienna, Austria; ATP International Series Gold; Hard (i) – $689,000; Singles – Doubles	(Canada) Daniel Nestor (The Bahamas) Mark Knowles; 5–3, 5–4^{(7–2)}	(Israel) Jonathan Erlich (Israel) Andy Ram	(Czech Republic) Radek Štěpánek (Spain) Tommy Robredo	(Argentina) David Nalbandian (Spain) Feliciano López (Chile) Fernando González (Monaco) Jean-René Lisnard
10 Oct	Stockholm Open; Stockholm, Sweden; ATP International Series; Hard (i) – $800,000; Singles – Doubles	(United States) James Blake; 6–1, 7–6^{(8–6)}	(Thailand) Paradorn Srichaphan	(Italy) Davide Sanguinetti (Belgium) Olivier Rochus	(Sweden) Thomas Johansson (Germany) Rainer Schüttler (Sweden) Jonas Björkman (Spain) Alberto Martín
10 Oct	Stockholm Open; Stockholm, Sweden; ATP International Series; Hard (i) – $800,000; Singles – Doubles	(Australia) Wayne Arthurs (Australia) Paul Hanley; 5–3, 5–3	(India) Leander Paes (Serbia and Montenegro) Nenad Zimonjić	(Italy) Davide Sanguinetti (Belgium) Olivier Rochus	(Sweden) Thomas Johansson (Germany) Rainer Schüttler (Sweden) Jonas Björkman (Spain) Alberto Martín
10 Oct	ATP Kremlin Cup; Moscow, Russia; ATP International Series; Carpet (i) – $1,000,000; Singles – Doubles	(Russia) Igor Andreev; 5–7, 7–6^{(7–3)}, 6–2	(Germany) Nicolas Kiefer	(Russia) Dmitry Tursunov (Russia) Igor Kunitsyn	(Italy) Daniele Bracciali (Russia) Mikhail Youzhny (Belarus) Max Mirnyi (Romania) Andrei Pavel
10 Oct	ATP Kremlin Cup; Moscow, Russia; ATP International Series; Carpet (i) – $1,000,000; Singles – Doubles	(Belarus) Max Mirnyi (Russia) Mikhail Youzhny; 5–1, 5–1	(Russia) Igor Andreev (Russia) Nikolay Davydenko	(Russia) Dmitry Tursunov (Russia) Igor Kunitsyn	(Italy) Daniele Bracciali (Russia) Mikhail Youzhny (Belarus) Max Mirnyi (Romania) Andrei Pavel
17 Oct	Mutua Madrileña Masters Madrid; Madrid, Spain; ATP Masters Series; Hard (i) – $2,200,000; Singles – Doubles	(Spain) Rafael Nadal; 3–6, 2–6, 6–4, 6–3, 7–6^{(7–3)}	(Croatia) Ivan Ljubičić	(United States) Robby Ginepri (Argentina) David Nalbandian	(Czech Republic) Radek Štěpánek (Spain) David Ferrer (Chile) Fernando González (Croatia) Ivo Karlović
17 Oct	Mutua Madrileña Masters Madrid; Madrid, Spain; ATP Masters Series; Hard (i) – $2,200,000; Singles – Doubles	(The Bahamas) Mark Knowles (Canada) Daniel Nestor; 3–6, 6–3, 6–2	(India) Leander Paes (Serbia) Nenad Zimonjić	(United States) Robby Ginepri (Argentina) David Nalbandian	(Czech Republic) Radek Štěpánek (Spain) David Ferrer (Chile) Fernando González (Croatia) Ivo Karlović
24 Oct	Davidoff Swiss Indoors; Basel, Switzerland; ATP International Series; Carpet (i) – $1,000,000; Singles – Doubles	(Chile) Fernando González; 6–7^{(8–10)}, 6–3, 7–5, 6–4	(Cyprus) Marcos Baghdatis	(Slovakia) Dominik Hrbatý (Argentina) David Nalbandian	(Belgium) Kristof Vliegen (United Kingdom) Andy Murray (Argentina) José Acasuso (Thailand) Paradorn Srichaphan
24 Oct	Davidoff Swiss Indoors; Basel, Switzerland; ATP International Series; Carpet (i) – $1,000,000; Singles – Doubles	(Argentina) Agustín Calleri (Chile) Fernando González; 7–5, 7–5	(Australia) Stephen Huss (South Africa) Wesley Moodie	(Slovakia) Dominik Hrbatý (Argentina) David Nalbandian	(Belgium) Kristof Vliegen (United Kingdom) Andy Murray (Argentina) José Acasuso (Thailand) Paradorn Srichaphan
24 Oct	Grand Prix de Tennis de Lyon; Lyon, France; ATP International Series; Carpet (i) – $800,000; Singles – Doubles	(United States) Andy Roddick; 6–3, 6–2	(France) Gaël Monfils	(France) Fabrice Santoro (France) Sébastien Grosjean	(Croatia) Mario Ančić (United States) Vince Spadea (France) Marc Gicquel (Belgium) Olivier Rochus
24 Oct	Grand Prix de Tennis de Lyon; Lyon, France; ATP International Series; Carpet (i) – $800,000; Singles – Doubles	(France) Michaël Llodra (France) Fabrice Santoro; 6–3, 6–1	(South Africa) Jeff Coetzee (Netherlands) Rogier Wassen	(France) Fabrice Santoro (France) Sébastien Grosjean	(Croatia) Mario Ančić (United States) Vince Spadea (France) Marc Gicquel (Belgium) Olivier Rochus
24 Oct	St. Petersburg Open; Saint Petersburg, Russia; ATP International Series; Carpet (i) – $1,000,000; Singles – Doubles	(Sweden) Thomas Johansson; 6–4, 6–2	(Germany) Nicolas Kiefer	(Czech Republic) Robin Vik (Spain) Fernando Verdasco	(Russia) Nikolay Davydenko (Russia) Mikhail Youzhny (Denmark) Kenneth Carlsen (United Kingdom) Greg Rusedski
24 Oct	St. Petersburg Open; Saint Petersburg, Russia; ATP International Series; Carpet (i) – $1,000,000; Singles – Doubles	(Austria) Julian Knowle (Austria) Jürgen Melzer; 4–6, 7–5, 7–5	(Sweden) Jonas Björkman (Belarus) Max Mirnyi	(Czech Republic) Robin Vik (Spain) Fernando Verdasco	(Russia) Nikolay Davydenko (Russia) Mikhail Youzhny (Denmark) Kenneth Carlsen (United Kingdom) Greg Rusedski
31 Oct	BNP Paribas Masters; Paris, France; ATP Masters Series; Carpet (i) – $2,450,000; Singles – Doubles	(Czech Republic) Tomáš Berdych; 6–3, 6–4, 3–6, 4–6, 6–4	(Croatia) Ivan Ljubičić	(United States) Andy Roddick (Czech Republic) Radek Štěpánek	(Spain) David Ferrer (Spain) Tommy Robredo (Russia) Nikolay Davydenko (Argentina) Gastón Gaudio
31 Oct	BNP Paribas Masters; Paris, France; ATP Masters Series; Carpet (i) – $2,450,000; Singles – Doubles	(United States) Bob Bryan (United States) Mike Bryan; 6–4, 6–7^{(3–7)}, 6–4	(Canada) Daniel Nestor (The Bahamas) Mark Knowles	(United States) Andy Roddick (Czech Republic) Radek Štěpánek	(Spain) David Ferrer (Spain) Tommy Robredo (Russia) Nikolay Davydenko (Argentina) Gastón Gaudio

=== November ===
Week	Tournament	Champions	Runners-up	Semifinalists	Quarterfinalists
14 Nov	Tennis Masters Cup; Shanghai, China; Tennis Masters Cup; Carpet (i) – $3,700,000; Singles – Doubles	(Argentina) David Nalbandian; 6–7^{(4–7)}, 6–7^{(11–13)}, 6–2, 6–1, 7–6^{(7–3)}	(Switzerland) Roger Federer	(Argentina) Gastón Gaudio (Russia) Nikolay Davydenko	Round Robin (Croatia) Ivan Ljubičić (Argentina) Guillermo Coria (Chile) Fernando González (Argentina) Mariano Puerta (United States) Andre Agassi
14 Nov	Tennis Masters Cup; Shanghai, China; Tennis Masters Cup; Carpet (i) – $3,700,000; Singles – Doubles	(France) Michaël Llodra (France) Fabrice Santoro; 6–7^{(6–8)}, 6–3, 7–6^{(7–4)}	(India) Leander Paes (Serbia and Montenegro) Nenad Zimonjić	(Argentina) Gastón Gaudio (Russia) Nikolay Davydenko	Round Robin (Croatia) Ivan Ljubičić (Argentina) Guillermo Coria (Chile) Fernando González (Argentina) Mariano Puerta (United States) Andre Agassi
28 Nov	Davis Cup Final; Bratislava, Slovakia – hard (i)	Croatia 3–2; Ivan Ljubičić; Mario Ančić; Ivo Karlović; Goran Ivanišević	Slovakia; Dominik Hrbatý; Karol Kučera; Michal Mertiňák; Karol Beck		

== Statistics ==
Number of singles titles:
11	(Switzerland) Roger Federer
	(Spain) Rafael Nadal
5	(United States) Andy Roddick
	(Argentina) Gastón Gaudio
3	(Chile) Fernando González
	(Russia) Igor Andreev
2	(Sweden) Joachim Johansson
	(Croatia) Ivan Ljubičić
	(Argentina) David Nalbandian
Players who won their first ATP singles title this year:
1.	(Belgium) Xavier Malisse	Delray Beach, USA
2.	(Australia) Wayne Arthurs	Scottsdale, USA
3.	(Russia) Igor Andreev	Valencia, Spain
4.	(France) Richard Gasquet	Nottingham, England
5.	(Croatia) Mario Ančić	Rosmalen, Netherlands
6.	(France) Gaël Monfils	Sopot, Poland
7.	(France) Florent Serra	Bucharest, Romania
Players who reached their first ATP singles final this year:
1.	(Czech Republic) Ivo Minář	Sydney, Australia	L
2.	(France) Gaël Monfils	Sopot, Poland	W
3.	(Germany) Florian Mayer	Sopot, Poland	L
4.	(France) Florent Serra	Bucharest, Romania	W
5.	(United Kingdom) Andy Murray	Bangkok, Thailand	L
6.	(Cyprus) Marcos Baghdatis	Basel, Switzerland	L
Players who defended their singles title:
1.	(Spain) Carlos Moyà	Chennai, India
2.	(Australia) Lleyton Hewitt	Sydney, Australia
3.	(Switzerland) Roger Federer	Dubai, UAE
	(Switzerland) Roger Federer	Indian Wells AMS
	(Switzerland) Roger Federer	Hamburg, Germany
	(Switzerland) Roger Federer	Halle, Germany
	(Switzerland) Roger Federer	Wimbledon
	(Switzerland) Roger Federer	US Open
	(Switzerland) Roger Federer	Bangkok
Winners/runners-up by country:
1.	Spain	12–10
2.	Switzerland	11–2
3.	Argentina	9–8
	(United States) USA	9–8
5.	Russia	5–2
6.	Sweden	5–0
7.	Croatia	3–9
8.	France	3–6
9.	Chile	3–1
10.	Australia	2–2
11.	Czech Republic	1–5
12.	Belgium	1–1
	(United Kingdom) Great Britain	1–1
14.	South Africa	1–0
	Denmark	1–0
15.	Germany	0–3
16.	Belarus	0–2
	Thailand	0–2
18.	Cyprus	0–1
	Romania	0–1
	Austria	0–1
	(Luxembourg) Luxemburg	0–1
	Italy	0–1

- Number of tournaments played on hardcourts: 30 (2 Grand Slams)
- Number of tournaments played on clay: 24 (1 Grand Slam)
- Number of tournaments played on grass: 6 (1 Grand Slam)
- Number of tournaments played on carpet: 7

== Entry rankings ==
Final rankings as of (27 December 2004)
Rk	Name	Nation	Points
1	Roger Federer	SUI	6,335
2	Andy Roddick	USA	3,655
3	Lleyton Hewitt	AUS	3,590
4	Marat Safin	RUS	3,060
5	Carlos Moyà	ESP	2,520
6	Tim Henman	GBR	2,465
7	Guillermo Coria	ARG	2,400
8	Andre Agassi	USA	2,100
9	David Nalbandián	ARG	1,945
10	Gastón Gaudio	ARG	1,920
11	Joachim Johansson	SWE	1,595
12	Guillermo Cañas	ARG	1,595
13	Tommy Robredo	ESP	1,465
14	Dominik Hrbatý	SVK	1,380
15	Sébastien Grosjean	FRA	1,370
16	Mikhail Youzhny	RUS	1,340
17	Tommy Haas	GER	1,330
18	Andrei Pavel	ROU	1,325
19	Nicolas Massú	CHI	1,320
20	Vincent Spadea	USA	1,285

Year-end rankings 2005 (26 December 2005)
Rk	Name	Nation	Points	Change
1	Roger Federer	SUI	6,725	Steady
2	Rafael Nadal	ESP	4,765	▲49
3	Andy Roddick	USA	3,085	▼1
4	Lleyton Hewitt	AUS	2,490	▼1
5	Nikolay Davydenko	RUS	2,390	▲23
6	David Nalbandian	ARG	2,370	▲3
7	Andre Agassi	USA	2,275	▲1
8	Guillermo Coria	ARG	2,190	▼1
9	Ivan Ljubičić	CRO	2,180	▲13
10	Gastón Gaudio	ARG	2,050	Steady
11	Fernando González	CHI	1,790	▲12
12	Marat Safin	RUS	1,730	▼8
13	Thomas Johansson	SWE	1,645	▲17
14	David Ferrer	ESP	1,620	▲35
15	Robby Ginepri	USA	1,520	▲48
16	Richard Gasquet	FRA	1,506	▲91
17	Juan Carlos Ferrero	ESP	1,500	▲14
18	Dominik Hrbatý	SVK	1,490	▼4
19	Tommy Robredo	ESP	1,490	▼6
20	Radek Štěpánek	CZE	1,440	▲13

Note: Mariano Puerta received a ranking penalty at the end of the 2005 season. His ranking dropped from 13 to 56.

== Notable breakthrough players ==
The 2005 season saw the debut of future world No. 1 Novak Djokovic into the main ATP Tour. Ranked world no. 186 at the beginning of the year, he qualified for the Australian Open but was defeated heavily in the first round by the eventual champion Marat Safin. He then recorded his first Grand Slam match victory at the French Open, defeating Robby Ginepri in the first round, before losing to Guillermo Coria in the second. He then reached the third round at both Wimbledon and the US Open, losing to Sébastien Grosjean and Fernando Verdasco, respectively. Djokovic would finish 2005 ranked world no. 78.

Future world No. 1 Andy Murray also made his breakthrough into the ATP Tour in 2005. Murray began the season ranked world No. 407 and was still participating in the junior tour, where he reached the semifinals of the French Open but lost to eventual champion Marin Čilić. He was awarded a wildcard into the main draw at Wimbledon, where he defeated George Bastl in the first round, and fourteenth seed Radek Štěpánek in the second, before losing to former finalist David Nalbandian in the third, despite having gone two sets to love up. He reached his first ATP Tour level final in October, at the 2005 Thailand Open as a wildcard, losing to Roger Federer; his run saw him enter the ATP's Top 100 for the first time. He eventually finished the season ranked world No. 63.

== Retirements ==
Following is a list of notable players (winners of a main tour title, and/or part of the ATP rankings top 100 (singles) or top 50 (doubles) for at least one week) who announced their retirement from professional tennis, became inactive (after not playing for more than 52 weeks), or were permanently banned from playing, during the 2002 season:

- Àlex Corretja (born 11 April 1974 in Barcelona, Spain) He turned professional in 1991 and finished runner-up twice at the French Open (in 1998 and 2001). He won the ATP Tour World Championships in 1998 and reached his career-high singles ranking of world no. 2 in 1999. He also played a key role in helping Spain win its first-ever Davis Cup title in 2000. He played his last match in Estoril against Feliciano López in April.
- Thomas Enqvist (born 13 March 1974 in Stockholm, Sweden) He turned professional in 1991 and reached his career-high ranking of no. 4 in 1999. He was a finalist at the Australian Open in 1999, losing to Yevgeny Kafelnikov, and a quarterfinalist at Wimbledon. He was also a semifinalist at the year-end championships. He played his last match in Luxemburg in November 2005 against George Bastl.
- Wayne Ferreira (born 15 September 1971 in Johannesburg, South Africa) He turned professional in 1989 and reached a career-high ranking of world no. 6 in 1995. He was a semifinalist twice at the Australian Open and a quarterfinalist at Wimbledon and the US Open. He earned 15 career singles titles. In doubles, he was ranked world no. 9 and earned 11 titles. He also won a silver medal at the 1992 Olympics. He played his last career match in Davis Cup competition in March.
- Richard Fromberg (born 28 April 1970 in Ulverstone, Australia) He turned professional in 1988 and reached his career-high ranking of world no. 24 in 1990. He earned four career ATP titles. He played his last career ATP match in doubles in Canberra in April partnering Chris Guccione.
- Karol Kučera (born March 4, 1974, in Bratislava, Czechoslovakia, now Slovakia) He turned professional in 1992 and reached a career-high ranking of world no. 6 in 1998. He was a semifinalist at the Australian Open and a quarterfinalist at the US Open in 1998. He earned six career ATP titles. He played his last
- (United States) Jared Palmer (born 2 July 1971 in New York City, New York) He turned professional in 1991 and reached his career-high singles ranking of world no. 35 in 1994. He earned one career ATP title. In doubles, he was ranked world no. 1 and won the Australian Open in 1995 and Wimbledon in 2001. He was also a finalist at the US Open in 2001 and a semifinalist at the French Open in 1996. His last career ATP match was at the US Open partnering Travis Parrott.
- Marc Rosset (born 7 November 1970 in Geneva, Switzerland) He turned professional in 1988 and reached his career-high ranking of world no. 9 in 1995. He was a semifinalist at the French Open in 1996 and a quarterfinalist at the Australian Open in 1999. He won the gold medal at the Olympics in 1992 and earned 15 career ATP titles. In doubles, he won eight titles and had a career-high ranking of world no. 8 in 1992. His last career match was in Lübeck in February against Dieter Kindlmann.
- Franco Squillari (born 22 August 1975 in Buenos Aires, Argentina) He turned professional in 1994 and reached a career-high ranking of world no. 11. He was a semifinalist at the French Open in 2000 and earned three career ATP titles. He played his last career match in Quito in October against Pablo Cuevas.
- Todd Woodbridge (born 2 April 1971 in Sydney, Australia) He turned professional in 1988 and reached a career-high singles ranking of world no. 19 and a doubles ranking of world no. 1. He won men's doubles at the Australian Open three times (1992, 1997, and 2001), at the French Open once (2000), Wimbledon nine times (1993, 1994, 1995, 1996, 1997, 2000, 2002, 2003, and 2004), the US Open twice (1992 and 1996) and the year-end tour finals twice (1992 and 1996). He won a gold medal at the 1996 Olympics and a silver at the 2000 Olympics. He also won seven mixed doubles Grand Slam titles: Australia in 1993, French in 1992 and 1995, Wimbledon in 1994, and the US Open in 1990, 1993, and 2001. He played his last doubles match at Wimbledon, partnering Mahesh Bhupathi.

== See also ==
- 2005 WTA Tour
