= 2005 ABN AMRO World Tennis Tournament =

- Date: 14–20 February
- Edition: 33rd
- Category: ATP International Series Gold
- Draw: 32S / 16D
- Prize money: $900,000
- Surface: Hardcourt / indoor
- Location: Rotterdam, Netherlands
- Venue: Rotterdam Ahoy

Champions

Singles
- (Switzerland) Roger Federer

Doubles
- (Israel) Jonathan Erlich / (Israel) Andy Ram
- ABN AMRO World Tennis Tournament

The 2005 ABN AMRO World Tennis Tournament was a men's tennis tournament played on indoor hard courts. It was the 33rd edition of the event known that year as the ABN AMRO World Tennis Tournament, and was part of the ATP International Series Gold of the 2005 ATP Tour. It took place at the Rotterdam Ahoy indoor sporting arena in Rotterdam, Netherlands, from 14 February through 20 February 2005. First-seeded Roger Federer won the singles title.

The singles draw was led by World No. 1, reigning Wimbledon, US Open and Tennis Masters Cup champion, Australian Open semifinalist, Doha titlist Roger Federer, French Open runner-up, Umag winner Guillermo Coria, and US Open semifinalist Tim Henman. Also present were Australian Open quarterfinalist David Nalbandian, Adelaide and Marseille champion Joachim Johansson, Nikolay Davydenko, Dominik Hrbatý and Feliciano López.

== Finals ==
=== Singles ===
(Switzerland) Roger Federer defeated (Croatia) Ivan Ljubičić 5–7, 7–5, 7–6^{(7–5)}

- It was Roger Federer's 2nd title of the year, and his 24th overall.

=== Doubles ===
(Israel) Jonathan Erlich / (Israel) Andy Ram defeated (Czech Republic) Cyril Suk / (Czech Republic) Pavel Vízner 6–4, 4–6, 6–3
