= 2005 Next Generation Hardcourts – Doubles =

Doubles
- 2005 Next Generation Hardcourts

Final
- Champions: (Belgium) Xavier Malisse (Belgium) Olivier Rochus
- Runners-up: (Sweden) Simon Aspelin (Australia) Todd Perry
- Score: 7–6^{(7–5)}, 6–4

Events
Singles	Doubles
← 2004 ·	Next Generation Hardcourts	· 2006 →

Bob Bryan and Mike Bryan were the defending champions, but did not participate this year.

Xavier Malisse and Olivier Rochus won the title, defeating Simon Aspelin and Todd Perry 7–6^{(7–5)}, 6–4 in the final.

== Seeds ==
1. (Argentina) Gastón Etlis / (Argentina) Martín Rodríguez (second round)
2. (Australia) Wayne Arthurs / (Australia) Paul Hanley (second round)
3. (Belgium) Xavier Malisse / (Belgium) Olivier Rochus (champions)
4. (Sweden) Simon Aspelin / (Australia) Todd Perry (final)

== Draw ==
=== Key ===
- Q = Qualifier
- WC = Wild card
- LL = Lucky loser
- Alt = Alternate
- SE = Special exempt
- PR = Protected ranking
- ITF = ITF entry
- JE = Junior exempt
- w/o = Walkover
- r = Retired
- d = Defaulted
- SR = Special ranking

First round
1	(Argentina) G Etlis (Argentina) M Rodríguez	1	7^{7}	6
(Sweden) J Johansson (Australia) T Woodbridge	6	6^{5}	4
(Germany) N Kiefer (Czech Republic) R Štěpánek	6	6
(Germany) F Mayer (United States) G Oliver	1	3
4	(Sweden) S Aspelin (Australia) T Perry	7^{7}	7^{7}
(South Africa) C Haggard (South Africa) R Koenig	6^{2}	6^{2}
WC	(Australia) L Hewitt (Australia) R Rasheed	6^{3}	7^{7}	2
(Australia) J Kerr (United States) J Thomas	7^{7}	6^{5}	6
(Czech Republic) T Berdych (Austria) J Melzer	4	6	6^{1}
(United States) R Leach (United States) B MacPhie	6	1	7^{7}
WC	(Australia) P Baccanello (Australia) N Healey	3	6^{3}
3	(Belgium) X Malisse (Belgium) O Rochus	6	7^{7}
(Argentina) A Calleri (Argentina) J I Chela	7	3	6
(France) J Benneteau (France) C Saulnier	5	6	3
(United States) T Dent (United States) R Ginepri	4	6^{4}
2	(Australia) W Arthurs (Australia) P Hanley	6	7^{7}

Quarterfinals
1	(Argentina) G Etlis (Argentina) M Rodríguez	4	3
(Germany) N Kiefer (Czech Republic) R Štěpánek	6	6
4	(Sweden) S Aspelin (South Africa) T Perry	6	5	7
(Australia) J Kerr (United States) J Thomas	4	7	5
(United States) R Leach (United States) B MacPhie	4	6	3
3	(Belgium) X Malisse (Belgium) O Rochus	6	3	6
(Argentina) A Calleri (Argentina) J I Chela	7^{7}	7^{7}
2	(Australia) W Arthurs (Australia) P Hanley	6^{4}	6^{5}

Semifinals
(Germany) N Kiefer (Czech Republic) R Štěpánek
4	(Sweden) S Aspelin (Australia) T Perry	w/o
3	(Belgium) X Malisse (Belgium) O Rochus	6	6
(Argentina) A Calleri (Argentina) J I Chela	4	4

Final
4	(Sweden) S Aspelin (Australia) T Perry	6^{5}	4
3	(Belgium) X Malisse (Belgium) O Rochus	7^{7}	6
