= 2005 ABN AMRO World Tennis Tournament – Singles =

Singles
- 2005 ABN AMRO World Tennis Tournament

Final
- Champion: (Switzerland) Roger Federer
- Runner-up: (Croatia) Ivan Ljubičić
- Score: 5–7, 7–5, 7–6^{(7–5)}

Details
- Draw: 32 (4 Q / 3 WC )
- Seeds: 8

Events
Singles	Doubles
- ABN AMRO World Tennis Tournament

Lleyton Hewitt was the defending champion, but chose not to participate that year.

Roger Federer won in the final 5–7, 7–5, 7–6^{(7–5)}, against Ivan Ljubičić.

== Seeds ==
1. (Switzerland) Roger Federer (champion)
2. (Argentina) Guillermo Coria (second round)
3. (United Kingdom) Tim Henman (quarterfinals)
4. (Argentina) David Nalbandian (first round)
5. (Sweden) Joachim Johansson (second round)
6. (Russia) Nikolay Davydenko (quarterfinals)
7. (Slovakia) Dominik Hrbatý (first round)
8. (Spain) Feliciano López (first round)

== Draw ==
Key

- Q = Qualifier
- WC = Wild card
- LL = Lucky loser
- Alt = Alternate
- ITF = ITF entry
- PR = Protected ranking
- SR = Special ranking
- SE = Special exempt
- JE = Junior exempt
- JR = Junior Accelerator Programme entrant
- CO = College Accelerator Programme entrant
- NG = Next Gen Accelerator Program entrant
- w/o = Walkover
- r = Retired
- d = Defaulted

=== Finals ===
Semifinals
1	(Switzerland) Roger Federer	7	6
(Croatia) Mario Ančić	5	3
(Sweden) Thomas Johansson	6^{4}	5
(Croatia) Ivan Ljubičić	7	7

Final
1	(Switzerland) Roger Federer	5	7	7
(Croatia) Ivan Ljubičić	7	5	6^{5}

=== Top half ===
First round
1	(Switzerland) R Federer	6	6
Q	(Czech Republic) B Ulihrach	3	4
(France) S Grosjean	6^{5}	2
Q	(Switzerland) S Wawrinka	7	6
(Czech Republic) T Berdych	7	6
(Sweden) R Söderling	5	2
(Spain) F Verdasco	5	6	4
6	(Russia) N Davydenko	7	2	6
3	(United Kingdom) T Henman	7	6
(Germany) N Kiefer	5	4
(France) M Llodra	6^{4}	6	6
WC	(Netherlands) P Wessels	7	4	2
(Croatia) M Ančić	7	7
(United States) T Dent	6^{5}	5
Q	(Belgium) O Rochus	6	7
8	(Spain) F López	4	6^{4}

Second round
1	(Switzerland) R Federer	6	6
Q	(Switzerland) S Wawrinka	1	4
(Czech Republic) T Berdych	6^{8}	0
6	(Russia) N Davydenko	7	6
3	(United Kingdom) T Henman	6	6
(France) M Llodra	4	1
(Croatia) M Ančić	6	6
Q	(Belgium) O Rochus	4	3

Quarterfinals
1	(Switzerland) R Federer	7	7
6	(Russia) N Davydenko	5	5
3	(United Kingdom) T Henman	6^{5}	6^{4}
(Croatia) M Ančić	7	7

Semifinals
1	(Switzerland) R Federer	7	6
(Croatia) M Ančić	5	3

=== Bottom half ===
First round
5	(Sweden) J Johansson	6	6^{2}	6
Q	(Chinese Taipei) Y-t Wang	2	7	3
(Slovakia) K Beck	2	6	1
(Sweden) T Johansson	6	3	6
(Germany) R Schüttler	4	2
(Spain) JC Ferrero	6	6
(Czech Republic) R Štěpánek	6	4	6
4	(Argentina) D Nalbandian	2	6	1
7	(Slovakia) D Hrbatý	4	6	2
(Croatia) I Ljubičić	6	1	6
(Romania) A Pavel	6	5	4
WC	(Netherlands) S Schalken	4	7	6
(Russia) I Andreev	6^{4}	6	5
(Thailand) P Srichaphan	7	1	7
WC	(Netherlands) R Sluiter	2	4
2	(Argentina) G Coria	6	6

Second round
5	(Sweden) J Johansson	4	4
(Sweden) T Johansson	6	6
(Spain) JC Ferrero	4	7	3
(Czech Republic) R Štěpánek	6	6^{6}	6
(Croatia) I Ljubičić	6	5	6
WC	(Netherlands) S Schalken	4	7	3
(Thailand) P Srichaphan	2	7	6
2	(Argentina) G Coria	6	6^{2}	3

Quarterfinals
(Sweden) T Johansson	6	7
(Czech Republic) R Štěpánek	2	6^{5}
(Croatia) I Ljubičić	3	6	6
(Thailand) P Srichaphan	6	4	2

Semifinals
(Sweden) T Johansson	6^{4}	5
(Croatia) I Ljubičić	7	7
