= 2005 Open 13 – Doubles =

Doubles
- 2005 Open 13

Final
- Champions: (Czech Republic) Martin Damm (Czech Republic) Radek Štěpánek
- Runners-up: (The Bahamas) Mark Knowles (Canada) Daniel Nestor
- Score: 7–6^{(7–4)}, 7–6^{(7–5)}

Events
Singles	Doubles
← 2004 ·	Open 13	· 2006 →

Mark Knowles and Daniel Nestor were the defending champions. They finished runner-up this year.

Martin Damm and Radek Štěpánek won in the final 7–6^{(7–4)}, 7–6^{(7–5)}, against Knowles and Nestor.

== Seeds ==
1. (The Bahamas) Mark Knowles / (Canada) Daniel Nestor (final)
2. (Czech Republic) Cyril Suk / (Czech Republic) Pavel Vízner (first round)
3. (Israel) Jonathan Erlich / (Israel) Andy Ram (quarterfinals)
4. (Czech Republic) Martin Damm / (Czech Republic) Radek Štěpánek (champions)

== Draw ==
=== Key ===
- Q = Qualifier
- WC = Wild card
- LL = Lucky loser
- Alt = Alternate
- SE = Special exempt
- PR = Protected ranking
- ITF = ITF entry
- JE = Junior exempt
- w/o = Walkover
- r = Retired
- d = Defaulted
- SR = Special ranking

=== Draw ===
First round
1	(The Bahamas) M Knowles (Canada) D Nestor	7	6
WC	(France) S de Chaunac (France) J-R Lisnard	5	4
WC	(France) G Monfils (France) G Simon	6^{4}	3
(Austria) J Knowle (Czech Republic) P Pála	7^{7}	6
3	(Israel) J Erlich (Israel) A Ram	6	7
(Germany) N Kiefer (Thailand) P Srichaphan	3	5
(Slovakia) D Hrbatý (Sweden) J Johansson	4	6^{6}
(France) J Benneteau (France) N Mahut	6	7^{8}
(Croatia) M Ančić (France) M Llodra	6	6
(Russia) I Andreev (Russia) N Davydenko	3	4
(Czech Republic) T Berdych (Germany) R Schüttler	5	3
4	(Czech Republic) M Damm (Czech Republic) R Štěpánek	7	6
(United States) T Dent (Sweden) T Johansson	3	6	3
(France) J-F Bachelot (France) A Clément	6	4	6
(Spain) F López (Spain) F Verdasco	6	7^{11}
2	(Czech Republic) C Suk (Czech Republic) P Vízner	4	6^{9}

Quarterfinals
1	(The Bahamas) M Knowles (Canada) D Nestor	6	6
(Austria) J Knowle (Czech Republic) P Pála	3	4
3	(Israel) J Erlich (Israel) A Ram	5	4
(France) J Benneteau (France) N Mahut	7	6
(Croatia) M Ančić (France) M Llodra	4	6^{0}
4	(Czech Republic) M Damm (Czech Republic) R Štěpánek	6	7^{7}
(France) J-F Bachelot (France) A Clément	6	6
(Spain) F López (Spain) F Verdasco	3	3

Semifinals
1	(The Bahamas) M Knowles (Canada) D Nestor	6	6
(France) J Benneteau (France) N Mahut	3	2
4	(Czech Republic) M Damm (Czech Republic) R Štěpánek	6	7^{7}
(France) J-F Bachelot (France) A Clément	2	6^{3}

Final
1	(The Bahamas) M Knowles (Canada) D Nestor	6^{4}	6^{5}
4	(Czech Republic) M Damm (Czech Republic) R Štěpánek	7^{7}	7^{7}
