= 2005 Next Generation Hardcourts =

- Date: 3 – 9 January
- Edition: 28th
- Category: ATP International Series
- Draw: 32S / 16D
- Prize money: $394,000
- Surface: Hard
- Location: Adelaide, Australia

Champions

Singles
- (Sweden) Joachim Johansson

Doubles
- (Belgium) Xavier Malisse / (Belgium) Olivier Rochus
- Next Generation Hardcourts

The 2005 Next Generation Hardcourts was a men's Association of Tennis Professionals tennis tournament held in Adelaide, Australia that was part of the International Series of the 2005 ATP Tour. Second-seeded Joachim Johansson won his first title of the year and the 2nd of his career.

== Finals ==
=== Singles ===
(Sweden) Joachim Johansson defeated (United States) Taylor Dent 7–5, 6–3

=== Doubles ===
(Belgium) Xavier Malisse / (Belgium) Olivier Rochus defeated (Sweden) Simon Aspelin / (Australia) Todd Perry 7–6^{(7–5)}, 6–4
