= 2004 US Open – Men's singles =

Men's singles
- 2004 US Open

Final
- Champion: (Switzerland) Roger Federer
- Runner-up: (Australia) Lleyton Hewitt
- Score: 6–0, 7–6^{(7–3)}, 6–0

Details
- Draw: 128
- Seeds: 32

Events
Singles	men	women		boys	girls
Doubles	men	women	mixed	boys	girls
WC Singles	men	women	quad
WC Doubles	men	women	quad
Legends	men	women	mixed
← 2003 ·	US Open	· 2005 →

Roger Federer defeated Lleyton Hewitt in the final, 6–0, 7–6^{(7–3)}, 6–0 to win the men's singles tennis title at the 2004 US Open. It was his first US Open title and fourth major title overall. He was the first man to capture the Australian Open, Wimbledon Championships, and US Open in a season since Jimmy Connors in 1974. With the win, he became the tenth man to win three majors in a calendar year.

Andy Roddick was the defending champion, but was defeated in the quarterfinals by Joachim Johansson.

This marked the final major singles appearances of Todd Martin and Wayne Ferreira, the latter of whom made a record 56th consecutive major singles appearance.

== Seeds ==
1. (Switzerland) Roger Federer (champion)
2. (United States) Andy Roddick (quarterfinals)
3. (Spain) Carlos Moyà (third round)
4. (Australia) Lleyton Hewitt (final)
5. (United Kingdom) Tim Henman (semifinals)
6. (United States) Andre Agassi (quarterfinals)
7. (Spain) Juan Carlos Ferrero (second round)
8. (Argentina) David Nalbandian (second round)
9. (Argentina) Gastón Gaudio (second round)
10. (Chile) Nicolás Massú (second round)
11. (Germany) Rainer Schüttler (first round)
12. (France) Sébastien Grosjean (second round)
13. (Russia) Marat Safin (first round)
14. (Chile) Fernando González (first round)
15. (Thailand) Paradorn Srichaphan (third round)
16. (Romania) Andrei Pavel (fourth round, withdrew)
17. (Argentina) Juan Ignacio Chela (first round)
18. (Spain) Tommy Robredo (fourth round)
19. (Germany) Nicolas Kiefer (fourth round)
20. (Brazil) Gustavo Kuerten (first round)
21. (United States) Taylor Dent (second round)
22. (Slovakia) Dominik Hrbatý (quarterfinals)
23. (United States) Vince Spadea (second round)
24. (Croatia) Ivan Ljubičić (first round)
25. (Czech Republic) Jiří Novák (third round)
26. (United States) Mardy Fish (second round)
27. (Croatia) Mario Ančić (first round)
28. (Sweden) Joachim Johansson (semifinals)
29. (Argentina) Guillermo Cañas (third round)
30. (Spain) Feliciano López (third round)
31. (France) Fabrice Santoro (third round)
32. (Sweden) Jonas Björkman (first round)

== Draw ==
=== Key ===
- Q = Qualifier
- WC = Wild card
- LL = Lucky loser
- Alt = Alternate
- ITF = ITF entry
- PR = Protected ranking
- SR = Special ranking
- SE = Special exempt
- JE = Junior exempt
- JR = Junior Accelerator Programme entrant
- CO = College Accelerator Programme entrant
- NG = Next Gen Accelerator Program entrant
- w/o = Walkover
- r = Retired
- d = Defaulted

=== Finals ===
Quarterfinals
1	(Switzerland) Roger Federer	6	2	7	3	6
6	(United States) Andre Agassi	3	6	5	6	3
22	(Slovakia) Dominik Hrbatý	1	5	7	2
5	(United Kingdom) Tim Henman	6	7	5	6
(Germany) Tommy Haas	2	2	2
4	(Australia) Lleyton Hewitt	6	6	6
28	(Sweden) Joachim Johansson	6	6	3	2	6
2	(United States) Andy Roddick	4	4	6	6	4

Semifinals
1	(Switzerland) Roger Federer	6	6	6
5	(United Kingdom) Tim Henman	3	4	4
4	(Australia) Lleyton Hewitt	6	7	6
28	(Sweden) Joachim Johansson	4	5	3

Final
1	(Switzerland) Roger Federer	6	7^{7}	6
4	(Australia) Lleyton Hewitt	0	6^{3}	0

=== Top half ===
==== Section 1 ====
First round
1	(Switzerland) R Federer	7	6	6
(Spain) A Costa	5	2	4
Q	(Cyprus) M Baghdatis	2	6	6	7
(France) O Mutis	6	2	1	5
(Russia) D Tursunov	4	6	6^{5}	6	6
(Argentina) M Zabaleta	6	3	7^{7}	3	2
(United States) T Martin	6	4	4	5
31	(France) F Santoro	4	6	6	7
24	(Croatia) I Ljubičić	6	3	1^{r}
(South Korea) H-t Lee	3	6	1
(Spain) A Martín	3	6	6	6
(France) A Dupuis	6	2	4	4
(Russia) I Andreev	3	4	6	6	5
(Spain) F Verdasco	6	6	4	2	7
(Finland) J Nieminen	3	5	7^{7}	3
16	(Romania) A Pavel	6	7	6^{5}	6

Second round
1	(Switzerland) R Federer	6	6^{4}	6	6
Q	(Cyprus) M Baghdatis	2	7^{7}	3	1
(Russia) D Tursunov	1	3	4
31	(France) F Santoro	6	6	6
(South Korea) H-t Lee	6	7^{7}	6
(Spain) A Martín	4	6^{3}	1
(Spain) F Verdasco	5	3	6^{2}
16	(Romania) A Pavel	7	6	7^{7}

Third round
1	(Switzerland) R Federer	6	6	7^{9}
31	(France) F Santoro	0	4	6^{7}
(South Korea) H-t Lee	4	2	6	6	4
16	(Romania) A Pavel	6	6	1	1	6

Fourth round
1	(Switzerland) R Federer	w/o
16	(Romania) A Pavel

==== Section 2 ====
First round
10	(Chile) N Massú	6	6	6
(Argentina) J Acasuso	4	0	2
(Armenia) S Sargsian	2	6	6	6
(Spain) Á Corretja	6	4	0	1
(France) P-H Mathieu	6	7^{7}	7^{14}
(Netherlands) R Sluiter	2	6^{3}	6^{12}
(Morocco) Y El Aynaoui	1	1^{r}
21	(United States) T Dent	6	2
25	(Czech Republic) J Novák	7	6	6
(Czech Republic) R Štěpánek	5	1	3
Q	(United Kingdom) A Bogdanovic	3	6	6	1	4
(Spain) Á Calatrava	6	3	4	6	6
(Germany) F Mayer	6	6	6
(Brazil) F Saretta	4	2	1
(United States) R Ginepri	6^{5}	4	2
6	(United States) A Agassi	7^{7}	6	6

Second round
10	(Chile) N Massú	7^{8}	4	6	6^{6}	4
(Armenia) S Sargsian	6^{6}	6	3	7^{8}	6
(France) P-H Mathieu	6^{6}	6	6	7^{8}
21	(United States) T Dent	7^{8}	4	3	6^{6}
25	(Czech Republic) J Novák	7	6	6
(Spain) Á Calatrava	5	1	3
(Germany) F Mayer	5	6	2	0^{r}
6	(United States) A Agassi	7	2	6	1

Third round
(Armenia) S Sargsian	4	4	6	6	7^{7}
(France) P-H Mathieu	6	6	4	2	6^{4}
25	(Czech Republic) J Novák	4	2	3
6	(United States) A Agassi	6	6	6

Fourth round
(Armenia) S Sargsian	3	2	2
6	(United States) A Agassi	6	6	6

==== Section 3 ====
First round
3	(Spain) C Moyà	6^{6}	6	6	6
WC	(United States) B Baker	7^{8}	4	4	2
LL	(Serbia and Montenegro) J Tipsarević	1	3	4
WC	(United States) A Delic	6	6	6
Q	(Italy) P Starace	1	6	6	6
(Germany) A Popp	6	3	4	3
(Belgium) O Rochus	7	6	7^{8}
27	(Croatia) M Ančić	5	2	6^{6}
22	(Slovakia) D Hrbatý	6	6	6
(Spain) Ó Hernández	1	2	1
(Slovakia) K Kučera	6	1	1	6	6
(Belgium) X Malisse	1	6	6	4	1
Q	(Japan) T Suzuki	6^{5}	6	2	1
Q	(United States) P Goldstein	7^{7}	2	6	6
(Romania) V Hănescu	6	4	1	1
15	(Thailand) P Srichaphan	4	6	6	6

Second round
3	(Spain) C Moyà	6	3	6	6
WC	(United States) A Delic	2	6	3	2
Q	(Italy) P Starace	1	6	6	0	3
(Belgium) O Rochus	6	4	4	6	6
22	(Slovakia) D Hrbatý	6	6	1	5	6
(Slovakia) K Kučera	4	3	6	7	4
Q	(United States) P Goldstein	4	6^{4}	0
15	(Thailand) P Srichaphan	6	7^{7}	6

Third round
3	(Spain) C Moyà	6	4	3	7^{7}	5
(Belgium) O Rochus	4	6	6	6^{5}	7
22	(Slovakia) D Hrbatý	7^{10}	6	6
15	(Thailand) P Srichaphan	6^{8}	3	3

Fourth round
(Belgium) O Rochus	6	6	3	4	0
22	(Slovakia) D Hrbatý	2	3	6	6	6

==== Section 4 ====
First round
9	(Argentina) G Gaudio	7^{8}	4	6	6
(Argentina) J Mónaco	6^{6}	6	3	2
(Germany) D Elsner	6^{3}	4	3
(Sweden) T Johansson	7^{7}	6	6
(United Kingdom) G Rusedski	4	6	1	6	6^{7}
(France) C Saulnier	6	3	6	3	7^{9}
Q	(France) N Mahut	3	5	2
19	(Germany) N Kiefer	6	7	6
26	(United States) M Fish	7	6	6
(Spain) D Ferrer	5	3	2
Q	(Czech Republic) M Tabara	6	3	6	6
(Belarus) M Mirnyi	4	6	4	4
(Georgia (country)) I Labadze	6^{2}	0^{r}
Q	(France) J Golmard	7^{7}	0
(Croatia) I Karlović	6^{3}	7^{9}	6	4	4
5	(United Kingdom) T Henman	7^{7}	6^{7}	4	6	6

Second round
9	(Argentina) G Gaudio	3	6	4	4
(Sweden) T Johansson	6	2	6	6
(France) C Saulnier	6^{0}	3	6^{4}
19	(Germany) N Kiefer	7^{7}	6	7^{7}
26	(United States) M Fish	3	6	6	3	3
Q	(Czech Republic) M Tabara	6	3	1	6	6
Q	(France) J Golmard	2	4	6	6^{1}
5	(United Kingdom) T Henman	6	6	4	7^{7}

Third round
(Sweden) T Johansson	4	0	1
19	(Germany) N Kiefer	6	6	6
Q	(Czech Republic) M Tabara	6	3	7	4	3
5	(United Kingdom) T Henman	4	6	5	6	6

Fourth round
19	(Germany) N Kiefer	7^{7}	3	1	7^{7}	0^{r}
5	(United Kingdom) T Henman	6^{5}	6	6	6^{4}	3

=== Bottom half ===
==== Section 5 ====
First round
8	(Argentina) D Nalbandian	6	7^{7}	6
(Netherlands) D van Scheppingen	4	6^{5}	3
(Spain) Á Montañés	1	3	2
(Russia) M Youzhny	6	6	6
(United States) J Morrison	1	6	3	6^{8}
Q	(Finland) T Ketola	6	3	6	7^{10}
(Czech Republic) T Berdych	6	2	6	1	6
32	(Sweden) J Björkman	3	6	2	6	3
17	(Argentina) JI Chela	2	6^{1}	6	6	2
Q	(Brazil) R Mello	6	7^{7}	2	2	6
WC	(United States) W Odesnik	6	6^{7}	2	3
(Spain) D Sánchez	4	7^{9}	6	6
(Germany) T Haas	6	5	6	3	6
(Italy) D Sanguinetti	1	7	2	6	2
(France) O Patience	5	7^{8}	2	1
12	(France) S Grosjean	7	6^{6}	6	6

Second round
8	(Argentina) D Nalbandian	7^{7}	4	5	6	4
(Russia) M Youzhny	6^{4}	6	7	2	6
Q	(Finland) T Ketola	3	6^{1}	3
(Czech Republic) T Berdych	6	7^{7}	6
Q	(Brazil) R Mello	6	6	6
(Spain) D Sánchez	1	1	3
(Germany) T Haas	6	6	1	6
12	(France) S Grosjean	4	4	6	1

Third round
(Russia) M Youzhny	6	1	3	6	1
(Czech Republic) T Berdych	2	6	6	4	6
Q	(Brazil) R Mello	2	3	5
(Germany) T Haas	6	6	7

Fourth round
(Czech Republic) T Berdych	6^{6}	1	5
(Germany) T Haas	7^{8}	6	7

==== Section 6 ====
First round
14	(Chile) F González	4	6^{3}	7^{7}	1
(Sweden) R Söderling	6	7^{7}	6^{4}	6
(Russia) N Davydenko	1	6	3	7^{7}	4
(Australia) M Philippoussis	6	3	6	6^{5}	1^{r}
(Slovakia) K Beck	6	7^{7}	6
(France) T Ascione	3	6^{4}	4
PR	(Denmark) K Pless	6	3	6	7^{7}
20	(Brazil) G Kuerten	4	6	1	6^{4}
30	(Spain) F López	7^{7}	6	6
PR	(France) A Di Pasquale	6^{4}	3	2
Q	(Germany) P Kohlschreiber	6	6	6
(France) J Benneteau	1	1	4
(Morocco) H Arazi	6	7^{7}	6^{0}	3	6
(Denmark) K Carlsen	4	6^{5}	7^{7}	6	3
(South Africa) W Ferreira	1	5	4
4	(Australia) L Hewitt	6	7	6

Second round
(Sweden) R Söderling	1	6	5	4
(Russia) N Davydenko	6	2	7	6
(Slovakia) K Beck	6	7^{7}	7
PR	(Denmark) K Pless	1	6^{3}	5
30	(Spain) F López	7	7	6^{5}	1	6
Q	(Germany) P Kohlschreiber	5	5	7^{7}	6	2
(Morocco) H Arazi	6^{7}	1	2
4	(Australia) L Hewitt	7^{9}	6	6

Third round
(Russia) N Davydenko	3	6	6	1	4
(Slovakia) K Beck	6	4	3	6	6
30	(Spain) F López	1	4	2
4	(Australia) L Hewitt	6	6	6

Fourth round
(Slovakia) K Beck	4	2	2
4	(Australia) L Hewitt	6	6	6

==== Section 7 ====
First round
7	(Spain) JC Ferrero	4	7	7^{8}	6^{4}	6
Q	(Czech Republic) T Zíb	6	5	6^{6}	7^{7}	3
(Austria) S Koubek	6	6	1	2	6
WC	(United States) A Bogomolov Jr.	3	4	6	6	3
WC	(United States) R Ram	3	2	6	4
(United States) J-M Gambill	6	6	3	6
(Chinese Taipei) Lu Y-h	3	1	3
28	(Sweden) J Johansson	6	6	6
23	(United States) V Spadea	6^{3}	6	6	6
(Peru) L Horna	7^{7}	2	4	4
(Austria) J Melzer	7	6	4	6
(France) G Carraz	5	0	6	3
(France) M Llodra	2	7^{7}	7^{7}	6
(Belgium) G Elseneer	6	6^{2}	6^{5}	2
Q	(Italy) A Seppi	3	4	7^{7}	7^{7}	6
11	(Germany) R Schüttler	6	6	6^{5}	6^{1}	1

Second round
7	(Spain) JC Ferrero	6^{2}	6	7^{8}	2	3
(Austria) S Koubek	7^{7}	4	6^{6}	6	6
(United States) J-M Gambill	4	5	5
28	(Sweden) J Johansson	6	7	7
23	(United States) V Spadea	3	6	6	3	4
(Austria) J Melzer	6	4	3	6	6
(France) M Llodra	6	6	3	6
Q	(Italy) A Seppi	0	3	6	3

Third round
(Austria) S Koubek	7^{7}	6^{1}	1	3
28	(Sweden) J Johansson	6^{2}	7^{7}	6	6
(Austria) J Melzer	3	2	5
(France) M Llodra	6	6	7

Fourth round
28	(Sweden) J Johansson	6	6	6
(France) M Llodra	2	3	2

==== Section 8 ====
First round
13	(Russia) M Safin	6^{5}	4	6	3
(Sweden) T Enqvist	7^{7}	6	3	6
Q	(Austria) A Peya	2	6	6	6^{3}	6
WC	(United States) B Reynolds	6	3	3	7^{7}	4
(Australia) W Arthurs	4	7^{7}	3	3
(France) A Clément	6	6^{5}	6	6
Q	(Thailand) D Udomchoke	4	5	4
18	(Spain) T Robredo	6	7	6
29	(Argentina) G Cañas	6	4	7	6
LL	(Belgium) K Vliegen	3	6	5	1
WC	(United States) KJ Hippensteel	3	4	2
(Italy) F Volandri	6	6	6
Q	(Switzerland) I Heuberger	0	3	6	6	3
(Spain) R Nadal	6	6	4	2	6
WC	(United States) S Jenkins	0	2	2
2	(United States) A Roddick	6	6	6

Second round
(Sweden) T Enqvist	6	3	3	2
Q	(Austria) A Peya	1	6	6	6
(France) A Clément	3	3	6	4
18	(Spain) T Robredo	6	6	3	6
29	(Argentina) G Cañas	6	7	6
(Italy) F Volandri	4	5	1
(Spain) R Nadal	0	3	4
2	(United States) A Roddick	6	6	6

Third round
Q	(Austria) A Peya	3	3	2
18	(Spain) T Robredo	6	6	6
29	(Argentina) G Cañas	1	3	3
2	(United States) A Roddick	6	6	6

Fourth round
18	(Spain) T Robredo	3	2	4
2	(United States) A Roddick	6	6	6

Preceded by 2004 Wimbledon Championships – Men's singles	Grand Slam men's singles	Succeeded by 2005 Australian Open – Men's singles
