= 2005 Next Generation Hardcourts – Singles =

Singles
- 2005 Next Generation Hardcourts

Final
- Champion: (Sweden) Joachim Johansson
- Runner-up: (United States) Taylor Dent
- Score: 7–5, 6–3

Details
- Draw: 32
- Seeds: 8

Events
Singles	Doubles
← 2004 ·	Next Generation Hardcourts	· 2006 →

Dominik Hrbatý was the defending champion, but did not participate this year.

Joachim Johansson won the title, defeating Taylor Dent 7–5, 6–3 in the final.

== Seeds ==
1. (Australia) Lleyton Hewitt (quarterfinals)
2. (Sweden) Joachim Johansson (champion)
3. (Germany) Nicolas Kiefer (quarterfinals)
4. (Argentina) Juan Ignacio Chela (semifinals)
5. (United States) Taylor Dent (final)
6. (Czech Republic) Radek Štěpánek (second round)
7. (Germany) Florian Mayer (second round)
8. (Austria) Jürgen Melzer (quarterfinals)

== Draw ==
=== Key ===
- Q = Qualifier
- WC = Wild card
- LL = Lucky loser
- Alt = Alternate
- SE = Special exempt
- PR = Protected ranking
- ITF = ITF entry
- JE = Junior exempt
- w/o = Walkover
- r = Retired
- d = Defaulted
- SR = Special ranking

=== Finals ===
Semifinals
5	(United States) Taylor Dent	6	6
4	(Argentina) Juan Ignacio Chela	1	1
(Belgium) Olivier Rochus	1	6^{5}
2	(Sweden) Joachim Johansson	6	7^{7}

Final
5	(United States) Taylor Dent	5	3
2	(Sweden) Joachim Johansson	7	6

=== Section 1 ===
First round
1	(Australia) L Hewitt	2	6	6
Q	(France) A Clément	6	1	1
(Finland) J Nieminen	4	6	6^{2}
(Argentina) A Calleri	6	3	7^{7}
(Italy) P Starace	3	4
(France) J Benneteau	6	6
(United States) R Ginepri	1	6	2
5	(United States) T Dent	6	2	6
4	(Argentina) JI Chela	6	6
(Armenia) S Sargsian	1	1
Q	(France) S de Chaunac	4	6^{4}
Q	(France) J-R Lisnard	6	7^{7}
Q	(United States) A Delic	3	7	6
WC	(Australia) T Reid	6	5	2
(Czech Republic) T Berdych	4	6	3
8	(Austria) J Melzer	6	4	6

Second round
1	(Australia) L Hewitt	6	6
(Argentina) A Calleri	1	4
(France) J Benneteau	6	1	2
5	(United States) T Dent	4	6	6
4	(Argentina) JI Chela	7	7
Q	(France) J-R Lisnard	5	5
Q	(United States) A Delic	3	3
8	(Austria) J Melzer	6	6

Quarterfinals
1	(Australia) L Hewitt	6^{4}	3
5	(United States) T Dent	7^{7}	6
4	(Argentina) JI Chela	7^{7}	5	6
8	(Austria) J Melzer	6^{3}	7	2

Semifinals
5	(United States) T Dent	6	6
4	(Argentina) JI Chela	1	1

=== Section 2 ===
First round
6	(Czech Republic) R Štěpánek	6	6
(Germany) P Kohlschreiber	3	4
(Belgium) O Rochus	3	6	6
(France) A Dupuis	6	3	1
WC	(Australia) P Baccanello	2	6^{3}
(France) C Saulnier	6	7^{7}
(Netherlands) S Schalken	2	6	3
3	(Germany) N Kiefer	6	4	6
7	(Germany) F Mayer	6	3	7
(Australia) W Arthurs	4	6	5
(Sweden) T Enqvist	6	6
(Netherlands) R Sluiter	3	1
(Spain) A Martín	2	6^{1}
(Belgium) X Malisse	6	7^{7}
WC	(Australia) M Kimmich	2	4
2	(Sweden) J Johansson	6	6

Second round
6	(Czech Republic) R Štěpánek	0	3
(Belgium) O Rochus	6	6
(France) C Saulnier	4	3
3	(Germany) N Kiefer	6	6
7	(Germany) F Mayer	3	3
(Sweden) T Enqvist	6	6
(Belgium) X Malisse	7^{7}	3	6^{2}
2	(Sweden) J Johansson	6^{4}	6	7^{7}

Quarterfinals
(Belgium) O Rochus	6^{4}	7^{8}	7
3	(Germany) N Kiefer	7^{7}	6^{6}	5
(Sweden) T Enqvist	3	6	1
2	(Sweden) J Johansson	6	4	6

Semifinals
(Belgium) O Rochus	1	6^{5}
2	(Sweden) J Johansson	6	7^{7}
