= 2005 ABN AMRO World Tennis Tournament – Doubles =

Doubles
- 2005 ABN AMRO World Tennis Tournament

Final
- Champions: (Israel) Jonathan Erlich (Israel) Andy Ram
- Runners-up: (Czech Republic) Cyril Suk (Czech Republic) Pavel Vízner
- Score: 6–4, 4–6, 6–3

Details
- Draw: 16
- Seeds: 4

Events
Singles	Doubles
- ABN AMRO World Tennis Tournament

Paul Hanley and Radek Štěpánek were the defending champions, but chose not to participate that year.

Jonathan Erlich and Andy Ram won in the final 6–4, 4–6, 6–3, against Cyril Suk and Pavel Vízner.

== Seeds ==
1. (The Bahamas) Mark Knowles / (Canada) Daniel Nestor (semifinals)
2. (Zimbabwe) Wayne Black / (Zimbabwe) Kevin Ullyett (semifinals)
3. (Czech Republic) Cyril Suk / (Czech Republic) Pavel Vízner (final)
4. (Israel) Jonathan Erlich / (Israel) Andy Ram (champions)

== Draw ==
Key

- Q = Qualifier
- WC = Wild card
- LL = Lucky loser
- Alt = Alternate
- ITF = ITF entry
- PR = Protected ranking
- SR = Special ranking
- SE = Special exempt
- JE = Junior exempt
- JR = Junior Accelerator Programme entrant
- CO = College Accelerator Programme entrant
- NG = Next Gen Accelerator Program entrant
- w/o = Walkover
- r = Retired
- d = Defaulted

=== Draw ===
First round
1	(The Bahamas) M Knowles (Canada) D Nestor	6	6
(Slovakia) D Hrbatý (Sweden) T Johansson	1	2
(South Africa) R Koenig (United States) J Thomas	0	3
(Germany) R Schüttler (Thailand) P Srichaphan	6	6
3	(Czech Republic) C Suk (Czech Republic) P Vízner	7	6
(France) S Grosjean (France) M Llodra	6^{10}	3
(Slovakia) K Beck (Czech Republic) M Damm	6^{2}	6	6
WC	(Netherlands) M van Gemerden (Netherlands) D van Scheppingen	7	3	4
(Spain) F López (Spain) F Verdasco	6	1	6
(Russia) I Andreev (Russia) N Davydenko	4	6	4
(Croatia) I Ljubičić (Italy) U Vico	4	2
4	(Israel) J Erlich (Israel) A Ram	6	6
(Czech Republic) T Berdych (Romania) A Pavel	1	r
WC	(Netherlands) R Sluiter (Netherlands) P Wessels	6
(Austria) J Knowle (Czech Republic) P Pála	2	4
2	(Zimbabwe) W Black (Zimbabwe) K Ullyett	6	6

Quarterfinals
1	(The Bahamas) M Knowles (Canada) D Nestor	6	6
(Germany) R Schüttler (Thailand) P Srichaphan	3	4
3	(Czech Republic) C Suk (Czech Republic) P Vízner	5	7	6
(Slovakia) K Beck (Czech Republic) M Damm	7	6^{7}	4
(Spain) F López (Spain) F Verdasco	6	6^{2}	4
4	(Israel) J Erlich (Israel) A Ram	4	7	6
(Netherlands) R Sluiter (Netherlands) P Wessels	3	2
2	(Zimbabwe) W Black (Zimbabwe) K Ullyett	6	6

Semifinals
1	(The Bahamas) M Knowles (Canada) D Nestor	5	4
3	(Czech Republic) C Suk (Czech Republic) P Vízner	7	6
4	(Israel) J Erlich (Israel) A Ram	6	7
2	(Zimbabwe) W Black (Zimbabwe) K Ullyett	3	6^{9}

Final
3	(Czech Republic) C Suk (Czech Republic) P Vízner	4	6	3
4	(Israel) J Erlich (Israel) A Ram	6	4	6
