= 2005 Open 13 =

- Date: 7–14 February
- Edition: 13th
- Category: International Series
- Draw: 32S / 16D
- Prize money: $575,000
- Surface: Hard / indoor
- Location: Marseille, France

Champions

Singles
- (Sweden) Joachim Johansson

Doubles
- (Czech Republic) Martin Damm / (Czech Republic) Radek Štěpánek
- Open 13

The 2005 Open 13 was an ATP men's tennis tournament played on indoor hard courts in Marseille, France that was part of the 2005 ATP Tour. It was the 13th edition of the tournament and was held from February 7 to February 14. Third-seeded Joachim Johansson won the singles title.

== Finals ==
=== Singles ===
(Sweden) Joachim Johansson defeated (Croatia) Ivan Ljubičić 7–5, 6–4

- It was Johansson's 2nd and last singles title of the year and the 3rd and last of his career.

=== Doubles ===
(Czech Republic) Martin Damm / (Czech Republic) Radek Štěpánek defeated (The Bahamas) Mark Knowles / (Canada) Daniel Nestor 7–6^{(7–4)}, 7–6^{(7–5)}

- It was Damm's 1st title of the year and the 30th of his career. It was Štěpánek's 1st title of the year and the 10th of his career.
