= 2005 Open 13 – Singles =

Singles
- 2005 Open 13

Final
- Champion: (Sweden) Joachim Johansson
- Runner-up: (Croatia) Ivan Ljubičić
- Score: 7–5, 6–4

Details
- Draw: 32 (4 Q / 3 WC )
- Seeds: 8

Events
Singles	Doubles
← 2004 ·	Open 13	· 2006 →

Joachim Johansson defeated Ivan Ljubičić 7–5, 6–4 to win the 2005 Open 13 singles competition. Dominik Hrbatý was the defending champion.

== Seeds ==
1. (Argentina) Guillermo Coria (first round)
2. (Argentina) David Nalbandian (second round)
3. (Sweden) Joachim Johansson (champion)
4. (Russia) Nikolay Davydenko (first round)
5. (Slovakia) Dominik Hrbatý (first round)
6. (Spain) Feliciano López (semifinals)
7. (Germany) Nicolas Kiefer (first round)
8. (Croatia) Ivan Ljubičić (final)

== Draw ==
=== Key ===
- Q = Qualifier
- WC = Wild card
- LL = Lucky loser
- Alt = Alternate
- SE = Special exempt
- PR = Protected ranking
- ITF = ITF entry
- JE = Junior exempt
- w/o = Walkover
- r = Retired
- d = Defaulted
- SR = Special ranking

=== Finals ===
Semifinals
(Croatia) Mario Ančić	5	6	4
8	(Croatia) Ivan Ljubičić	7	2	6
3	(Sweden) Joachim Johansson	6^{1}	7^{8}	6
6	(Spain) Feliciano López	7^{7}	6^{6}	4

Final
8	(Croatia) Ivan Ljubičić	5	4
3	(Sweden) Joachim Johansson	7	6

=== Top half ===
First round
1	(Argentina) G Coria	4	5
Q	(France) S de Chaunac	6	7
(France) M Llodra	6^{2}	6	3
(United Kingdom) G Rusedski	7^{7}	4	6
(Thailand) P Srichaphan	7^{7}	2	6^{4}
(Czech Republic) T Berdych	6^{5}	6	7^{7}
(Croatia) M Ančić	6	7
5	(Slovakia) D Hrbatý	3	5
4	(Russia) N Davydenko	6	4	1
(Netherlands) S Schalken	3	6	6
Q	(Monaco) J-R Lisnard	2	7^{7}	4
WC	(France) J Haehnel	6	6^{5}	6
WC	(France) G Monfils	3	2
(Russia) I Andreev	6	6
Q	(Romania) V Hănescu	6^{6}	7	4
8	(Croatia) I Ljubičić	7^{8}	5	6

Second round
Q	(France) S de Chaunac	w/o
(United Kingdom) G Rusedski
(Czech Republic) T Berdych	5	6^{4}
(Croatia) M Ančić	7	7^{7}
(Netherlands) S Schalken	6	6
WC	(France) J Haehnel	4	2
(Russia) I Andreev	3	4
8	(Croatia) I Ljubičić	6	6

Quarterfinals
Q	(France) S de Chaunac	6^{11}	3
(Croatia) M Ančić	7^{13}	6
(Netherlands) S Schalken	3	4
8	(Croatia) I Ljubičić	6	6

Semifinals
(Croatia) M Ančić	5	6	4
8	(Croatia) I Ljubičić	7	2	6

=== Bottom half ===
First round
7	(Germany) N Kiefer	3	2
(Slovakia) K Beck	6	6
(Czech Republic) R Štěpánek	6	2	1
WC	(France) A Clément	4	6	6
Q	(France) G Simon	6	4	6
(Sweden) T Johansson	4	6	2
(Spain) J C Ferrero	6^{4}	3
3	(Sweden) J Johansson	7^{7}	6
6	(Spain) F López	7	6
(Spain) F Verdasco	5	3
LL	(Taiwan) Y-T Wang	4	6^{4}
(Croatia) I Karlović	6	7^{7}
(United States) T Dent	6	6
(France) J Benneteau	2	2
(Germany) R Schüttler	7^{7}	4	5
2	(Argentina) D Nalbandian	6^{2}	6	7

Second round
(Slovakia) K Beck	6	6
WC	(France) A Clément	4	4
Q	(France) G Simon	6^{3}	3
3	(Sweden) J Johansson	7^{7}	6
6	(Spain) F López	7^{8}	6
(Croatia) I Karlović	6^{6}	4
(United States) T Dent	7^{7}	6
2	(Argentina) D Nalbandian	6^{3}	2

Quarterfinals
(Slovakia) K Beck	4	4
3	(Sweden) J Johansson	6	6
6	(Spain) F López	7	1	7^{10}
(United States) T Dent	5	6	6^{8}

Semifinals
3	(Sweden) J Johansson	6^{1}	7^{8}	6
6	(Spain) F López	7^{7}	6^{6}	4
