= Joachim Johansson =

Swedish tennis player (born 1982)

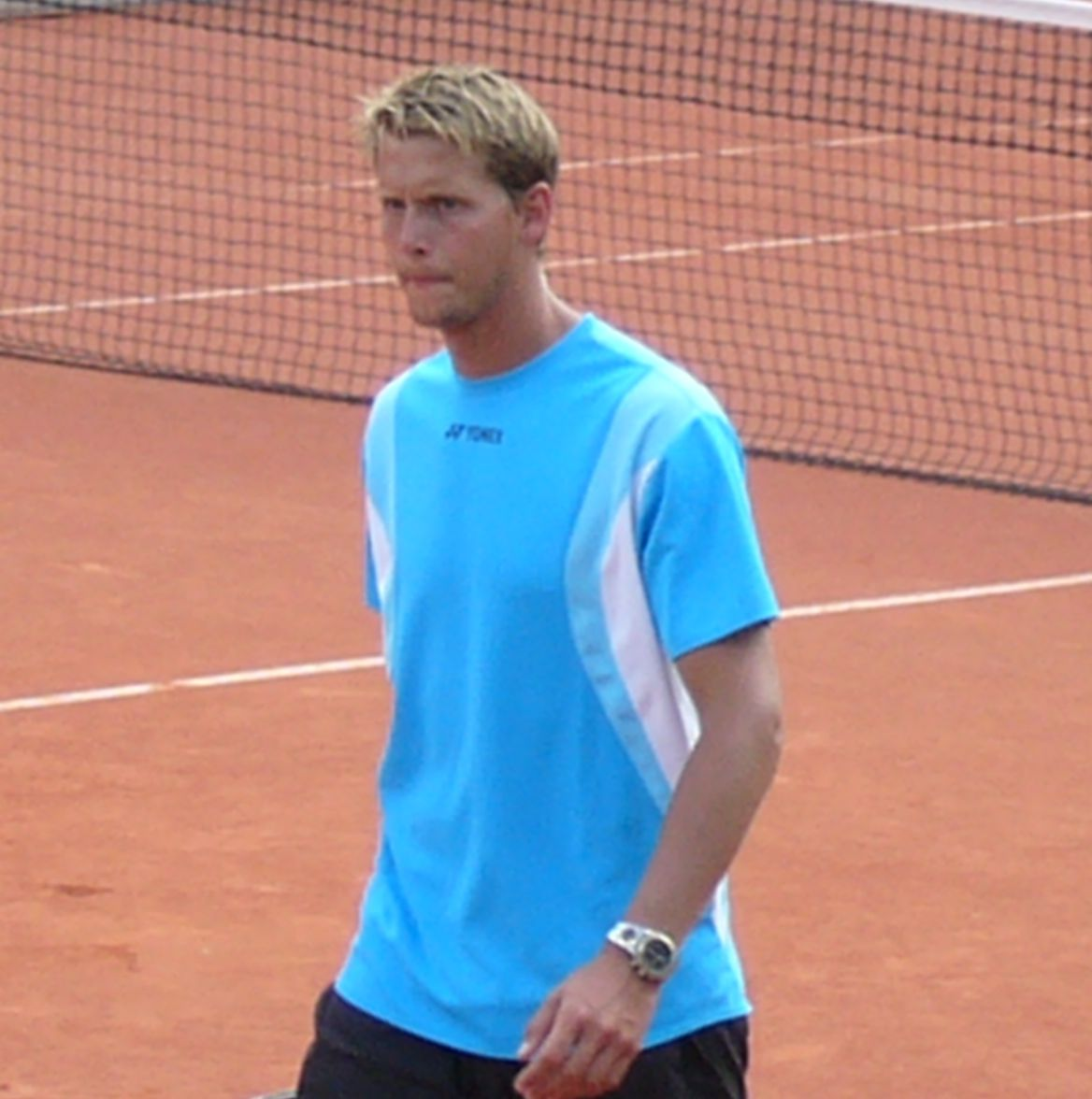
- Joachim Johansson during the Swedish Open tournament in Båstad, Sweden in July 2008
- Country (sports): Sweden
- Residence: Södertälje, Sweden
- Born: 1 July 1982 (age 44) Lund, Sweden
- Height: 1.98 m (6 ft 6 in)
- Turned pro: 2000
- Retired: 2011 (played occasionally afterwards)
- Plays: Right-handed (one-handed backhand)
- Prize money: US$ 1,549,039

Singles
- Career record: 72–59
- Career titles: 3
- Highest ranking: No. 9 (14 February 2005)

Grand Slam singles results
- Australian Open: 4R (2005)
- French Open: 1R (2004)
- Wimbledon: 4R (2004)
- US Open: SF (2004)

Other tournaments
- Olympic Games: 2R (2008)

Doubles
- Career record: 16–14
- Career titles: 1
- Highest ranking: No. 108 (1 February 2008)

Team competitions
- Davis Cup: SF (2007)

Joachim Johansson (born 1 July 1982) is a former professional male tennis player from Sweden. He reached the semifinals of the 2004 US Open, won 3 singles titles and achieved a career-high singles ranking of World No. 9 in February 2005.

== Background ==
Johansson was born in Lund and currently lives in Södertälje, Sweden. His father, Leif Johansson, was also a tennis player and represented Sweden in the Davis Cup in the 1970s. He goes by the nickname "Pim Pim", which he has been called since he was a newborn. His elder brother pronounced Joachim as "Joapim" which later became "Pim Pim". In 2005, Swedish hurdler Jenny Kallur became his girlfriend but in August 2008 they separated. Lleyton Hewitt's sister, Jaslyn Hewitt, was his girlfriend for five years from 2000 to 2005. He is married to Johanna Westerberg, a Swedish professional golfer on the Ladies European Tour, and they have one child.

He is not related to fellow Swedish tennis player Thomas Johansson.

== Tennis career ==
=== 2000–2003 ===
Johansson competed in his first professional tour match in the 2000 Wideyes Swedish Open, where he retired against Markus Hipfl. He then claimed his first win in a Challenger event in Sweden, defeating Alexander Peya. He then competed in the 2000 Scania Stockholm Open losing to Bohdan Ulihrach.

In 2001 Johansson focused on Challengers and only competed in one ATP tour tournament: the 2001 Stockholm Open, losing to Andreas Vinciguerra. He however reached two Futures semifinals, in Great Britain and New Zealand, and two finals in Germany and Austria. He won his first Futures tournament in Australia, defeating Todd Perry.

In 2002 Johansson won three Futures events: in Poland, in Austria, and Sweden, and reached a final in Poland. He also won his first ATP Tour level match in his home tournament in the 2002 Stockholm Open, defeating Albert Portas before losing to Fabrice Santoro.

In 2003 Johansson made his Grand Slam Debut in the 2003 Australian Open losing to American Mardy Fish. He then represented Sweden against Australia in the Davis Cup, however he lost to Wayne Arthurs. He then competed in Newport losing to Zack Fleishman. In his US Open debut he once again lost to Mardy Fish. He competed once again for the fourth straight year in the 2003 Stockholm Open where he reached his first quarterfinals where he defeated his first top 30 opponent, world no. 25 Fernando González in the second round before losing to Davide Sanguinetti. He won two Challengers and reached two finals that year.

=== 2004 ===
2004 was the breakthrough year for Johansson. In his first tournament in the 2004 Adidas International, he got his first win over a top 10 player in Rainer Schüttler world no. 6 by that time before losing to Arnaud Clément. He followed it up with his first Grand Slam win in the 2004 Australian Open defeating Alexander Popp and Alberto Martín before losing to then world no. 3 Juan Carlos Ferrero in four sets. He subsequently competed in 2004 Siebel Open where he lost to eventual champion Andy Roddick in the quarterfinals. Johansson continued his good form by winning his first ATP title in the 2004 Kroger St. Jude defeating en route James Blake, Mardy Fish and German Nicolas Kiefer in the finals. However his good run was disrupted winning only two matches in his next seven tournaments defeating Mark Philippoussis and compatriot Robin Söderling. His losses included his debut in the 2004 French Open loss against Fernando Verdasco, Mario Ančić and Juan Mónaco. He then went to the 2004 Wimbledon losing to Florian Mayer in the fourth round after defeating Arnaud Clément, Mardy Fish and Jonas Björkman. He then reached his first Masters series quarterfinal at the 2004 Canada Masters losing to compatriot Thomas Johansson. His biggest career win came at the 2004 U.S. Open. He upset the defending champion, Andy Roddick, in five sets in the quarterfinals. An unusual aspect of the match was that Roddick won 24 points more than Johansson, but was defeated nonetheless. Johansson subsequently lost his semifinal against Lleyton Hewitt in straight sets. He ended the year with four straight quarterfinal appearances: in the 2004 Grand Prix de Tennis de Lyon losing to eventual champion Robin Söderling; in the 2004 Kremlin Cup; in the 2004 Madrid Masters; and in the 2004 Stockholm Open. Johansson ended the year no. 12 in the world.

=== Plagued by injuries (2005–2007) ===
Johansson began 2005 with a nice start winning in the 2005 Next Generation Adelaide International defeating Taylor Dent in the finals in two sets, reaching the fourth round of the 2005 Australian Open losing to Andre Agassi 7–6, 6–7, 6–7, 4–6 and winning the Open 13 event defeating Ivan Ljubičić in the finals which jumped him into the top 10 at number 9. He however only won five matches in his next 12 tournaments with wins in 2005 ABN AMRO World Tennis Tournament, Davis Cup, 2005 Estoril Open, and his only back-to-back win in the 2005 Wimbledon. He then underwent shoulder surgery in July 2005, forcing him to stop playing the rest of the year. In 2006 he added physical rehabilitation and development practice with coach Agne Bergvall together with Swedish track and field stars Carolina Klüft, Susanna and Jenny Kallur. Despite playing only in half of the year he ended at no. 45 still. In February 2006, he played in the SAP Open in San Jose but sustained another injury. He was forced to skip tournaments in Indian Wells and Miami, until beginning a second comeback in July 2006 by playing Challenger and Futures tournaments.

In October 2006, Johansson made a triumphant return to the ATP Tour in the Stockholm Open. He defeated Davide Sanguinetti in the first round, as a wildcard. He stunned the top seed and world number two, Rafael Nadal, in straight sets in the second round. In that match, Johansson fired 17 aces, and announced his return to the top of the game, calling it his "greatest win ever." Johansson made it to the semifinals of the tournament before losing to fifth-seeded Jarkko Nieminen in three sets. In his next tournament, the Madrid Masters, Johansson pulled off another upset in the second round, defeating fifth-seeded Nikolay Davydenko in three sets. He was forced to withdraw from his next match due to a throat infection.

In 2007 Johansson only competed in 4 tournaments in the 2007 Next Generation Adelaide International reaching the Semifinals before losing to Novak Djokovic, 2007 Australian Open retiring in the first round to Guillermo García-López 1–1 in the first set. He then underwent right shoulder surgery on 23 Feb. in Milan and did not return again until September for a Davis Cup SF tie against U.S. (l. to Roddick in opening rubber). Only lost his serve once in three sets to No. 5-ranked American. After the Davis Cup, he played one tournament in the 2007 Stockholm Open defeating Carlos Berlocq in the first round before withdrawing from the second round due to illness against eventual champion Ivo Karlović.

=== 2008–present (retirement and return) ===
Johansson retired from professional tennis on 1 February 2008 due to his persistent shoulder injury. Johansson said there was "no other option" than to quit. But on 3 October 2008 he announced that he will return to the world of tennis and that his shoulder injury had healed. He was given a wild card to compete in the 2008 Stockholm Open. He stamped his return by beating Nicolas Mahut in the first round before losing to David Nalbandian in the second round.

In 2009, he competed in the Challengers events reaching the semifinals in Izmir, Turkey before withdrawing against Andrea Stoppini. He then got a wildcard entry at the Malaysian Open and made a surprise win over Lleyton Hewitt in the first round before losing to Richard Gasquet. Next, he competed in the 2009 If Stockholm Open after receiving a wildcard. He defeated Peter Luczak and Juan Mónaco but then lost to Thomaz Bellucci.

In 2010, Johansson played his first match of 2010 in singles during the 2010 Davis Cup tie against Argentina, which he lost in four sets to Argentine Leonardo Mayer.

He received a wildcard at a Challenger Tour at the 2011 Internazionali di Tennis di Bergamo Trofeo Trismoka. He played in the Davis Cup against Russia. In October 2013, Johansson announced a mini-comeback to qualify for the 2013 If Stockholm Open. Given a wildcard to the qualifying draw by tournament director, Thomas Johansson, Johansson defeated world number 450 Erik Chvojka in the first round and world number 142 Matthias Bachinger in the second round. He defeated Alejandro Falla in the first round of the main draw, before losing to Milos Raonic.

== Records ==
He held the record for the most aces served in one match, with 51 against Andre Agassi, in the 4th round of the 2005 Australian Open (though he still lost the match in four sets). Johansson said in the post-match press conference, that

he felt that he could have served better. Ivo Karlović equalled the record on 21 June 2005 at Wimbledon against Daniele Bracciali, and at the 2009 French Open, Karlovic broke the record with 55 aces against Lleyton Hewitt in the first round, but he lost in five sets. Johansson still had a record – most aces served in 4-set match (51) until July 2014, when John Isner broke this record in the Wimbledon tournament. Isner served 52 aces, but he lost too.

== ATP career finals ==
=== Singles: 3 (3 wins) ===
Winner–Legend (pre/post 2009) Grand Slam tournaments (0) Tennis Masters Cup / ATP World Tour Finals (0) ATP Masters Series / ATP World Tour Masters 1000 (0) ATP International Series Gold / ATP World Tour 500 Series (1/0) ATP International Series / ATP World Tour 250 Series (2/0)	Titles by surface Hard (3/0) Clay (0/0) Grass (0/0) Carpet (0/0)

Result	W/L	Date	Tournament	Surface	Opponent	Score
Win	1–0	Feb 2004	Memphis, United States	Hard	(Germany) Nicolas Kiefer	7–6, 6–3
Win	2–0	Jan 2005	Adelaide, Australia	Hard	(United States) Taylor Dent	7–5, 6–3
Win	3–0	Feb 2005	Marseille, France	Hard	(Croatia) Ivan Ljubičić	7–5, 6–4

=== Doubles: 2 (1 win, 1 loss) ===
Result	W/L	Date	Tournament	Surface	Partner	Opponents	Score
Loss	0–1	Jun 2005	Halle, Germany	Grass	(Russia) Marat Safin	(Switzerland) Yves Allegro (Switzerland) Roger Federer	5–7, 7–6^{(8–6)}, 3–6
Win	1–1	Jul 2005	Båstad, Sweden	Clay	(Sweden) Jonas Björkman	(Argentina) José Acasuso (Argentina) Sebastián Prieto	6–2, 6–3

== Singles performance timeline ==
Key
W	F	SF	QF	#R	RR	Q#	DNQ	A	NH

(W) winner; (F) finalist; (SF) semifinalist; (QF) quarterfinalist; (#R) rounds 4, 3, 2, 1; (RR) round-robin stage; (Q#) qualification round; (DNQ) did not qualify; (A) absent; (NH) not held; (SR) strike rate (events won / competed); (W–L) win–loss record.

Tournament	2000	2001	2002	2003	2004	2005	2006	2007	2008	2009	2010	2011	2013	Career win–loss
Australian Open	A	A	A	1R	3R	4R	A	1R	A	A	A	A	A	5–4
French Open	A	A	A	Q1	1R	A	A	A	A	A	A	A	A	0–1
Wimbledon	A	A	A	Q1	4R	3R	A	A	A	A	A	A	A	5–2
US Open	A	A	A	1R	SF	A	A	A	A	A	A	A	A	5–2
Grand Slam Win–loss	0–0	0–0	0–0	0–2	10–4	5–2	0–0	0–1	0–0	0–0	0–0	0–0	0–0	15–9
Year End Ranking	773	390	219	95	11	54	193	350	771	365	889	554	694	N/A

== See also ==
- List of male tennis players
- List of Sweden Davis Cup team representatives

Awards
Preceded by Rainer Schüttler	ATP Most Improved Player; 2004	Succeeded by Rafael Nadal
