= 2004 Serena Williams tennis season =

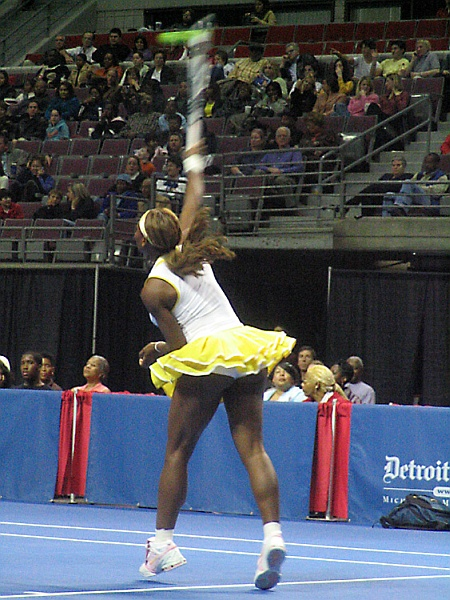
- Full name: Serena Jameka Williams
- Country: United States
- Calendar prize money: $2,251,798

Singles
- Season record: 39–9 (81%)
- Calendar titles: 2
- Year-end ranking: 7
- Ranking change from previous year: ▼4

Grand Slam & significant results
- Australian Open: A
- French Open: QF
- Wimbledon: F
- US Open: QF
- Olympic Games: A

Serena Williams's 2004 tennis season did not begin until Miami, due to a left knee injury which kept her off court since Wimbledon in 2003.

== Year in detail ==
=== NASDAQ-100 Open ===
Williams missed the first quarter of the season and played her first tournament at the NASDAQ-100 Open in Miami. Williams was seeded first despite the 8-month lay-off with the withdrawal of the top 5. Williams played her first match against Marta Marrero dropping only a game in just 42 minutes. In her next match, she took on Elena Likhovtseva, the pair traded sets to push it to a decider which Williams won in her fifth match point. In the Round of 16, Williams won in straight sets against young Russian Maria Sharapova. In the last 8, Williams dominated compatriot Jill Craybas, dropping only a single game. Williams then faced surprise semifinalist Eleni Daniilidou and won both set in four to advance to her first final in her first tournament since winning Wimbledon. In the final, Williams faced Russian Elena Dementieva. Dementieva took the first game before Williams could win the next 11 games before Dementieva could take another game. Williams then close it out in the next game to win her third Miami title in 50 minutes.

=== Clay Season and French Open ===
==== Bausch & Lomb Championships ====
Williams began her claycourt season at the Bausch & Lomb Championships where she was the second seed. Williams received a bye and then faced Mary Pierce in her first match and defeated the former Amelia Island champion in straight sets. In the third round, Williams took on Karolina Šprem and took the first set with a drop of only a game, but Šprem took the first 3 games of the second just to see Williams take 7 of the next 9 to win the match. In the last 8, Williams went against 7th seed Nadia Petrova, Williams fell in straight sets after tweaking her knee in the fifth game and making 42 unforced errors.

==== Family Circle Cup ====
Williams then played at the Family Circle Cup as the second seed. Williams received a bye in the first round to win in straight sets against Kelly McCain dropping only a game. Williams then withdrew from her match against Conchita Martínez with a sore left knee.

==== Internazionali BNL d'Italia ====
After missing a month due to knee injury, Williams came back at the Internazionali BNL d'Italia, Williams had a bye in the first round, she then played María Sánchez Lorenzo, Williams was a bit rusty losing the first two games in each set, but came through in straight sets. Williams then faced Dally Randriantefy, Williams only dropped four games, despite failing to serve the match at eight game of the second. In the final 8, Williams went against Svetlana Kuznetsova, after scrapping through the first set, Williams ended the match with a bagel to advance. In the semifinals, Williams fell to Jennifer Capriati in straight sets despite saving a match point, winning only four games in each set.

==== French Open ====
Williams came into the French Open as the second seed. She opened her campaign against Iveta Benešová and won in straight sets, including a 28-point game in the seventh game of the second set. Williams next opponent was young Russian Maria Kirilenko who was making her French Open debut. The pair traded the first two sets, with Kirilenko leading by a break in the third, Williams then broke back in the eighth game and also broke in the tenth game to take the match. Williams then took on Silvija Talaja, Williams won in straight dropping only 4 games and delivering a bagel in the first set, despite making 9 double faults in the match. In the fourth round, Williams came through with ease against Japan's Shinobu Asagoe. Williams then took on compatriot Jennifer Capriati, the two Americans traded the first two sets, which was halted by rain. The third set, saw Capriati took and early break, and Williams broke back, just to be broken again in the eight game and took initiative and served it out.

=== Wimbledon ===
Williams came into Wimbledon as the two-time defending champion. Williams defeated Zheng Jie, dropping only four games and saved all ten break points she faced. In the following round, Williams took on Stéphanie Foretz Gacon and made quick work of the first set, taking it in a bagel. Williams then took the next set with a break lead. She then continued her good run again dropping four games, with a bagel in the second against Magüi Serna. In the round of 16, Williams faced fresh faced 16-year-old Tatiana Golovin and made quick work in straight sets. In a much anticipated quarterfinal match-up against Jennifer Capriati, Williams made quick work of her adversary in a double bagel in just 42 minutes. Williams had a semifinal clash against Amélie Mauresmo, Williams dropped her first set of the tournament in a tie-break. Williams then came back by breaking the Frenchwoman at the end of the second and third set, to come through to her third Wimbledon final in a row. In the final, Williams took on surprise finalist Maria Sharapova, where Serena lost surprisingly in straight sets, handing her younger Russian foe her first slam.

=== US Open Series ===
==== JPMorgan Chase Open ====
Williams began her US Open Series at the JPMorgan Chase Open. She received a bye in the first round as the top seed and then faced Greek Eleni Daniilidou. Williams took the first with ease, but scraped through the second in a tie-break. She then took out Arantxa Sánchez Vicario in the following round in straight sets, with a bagel in the first. In the final 8, Williams went against Russian Vera Zvonareva, after dropping the first set, Williams was able to go through 3 and 3. She then faced another Russian in Elena Dementieva and beat Dementieva in two close sets. However, in the final Williams was beaten comfortably by compatriot Lindsay Davenport, Williams winning only four games.

==== Acura Classic and Olympics ====
Williams then played at the Acura Classic. She received a bye in the first round and faced Jelena Janković losing the first set in a tie-break, but taking the next two sets to advance. In the round of 16, she took on Russian Elena Bovina and won in straight sets. However, Williams withdrew prior to her quarterfinal match against Vera Zvonareva because of swelling in her left knee. Williams was bound to play at the Olympics, when she withdrew due to the same injury.

==== US Open ====
"I'm very angry and bitter right now. I felt cheated. Shall I go on? I just feel robbed," a composed Williams said, laughing a bit. "At first, I thought it was another Wimbledon conspiracy."

— Williams after her quarterfinal loss

Williams aiming for her third US Open title after missing last year's edition. Williams' opened up against Czech Sandra Kleinová, Williams made quick work of Kleinová, winning in straight sets in just 53 minutes. In the following round Williams faced compatriot Lindsay Lee-Waters and dropped just seven games to advance. In the third round, Williams took on quick rising 16-year-old Tatiana Golovin. Golovin broke Williams early, however Williams came back and broke in the seventh game and took the set in the twelfth game. Williams then won the second set with a single break lead. In the round of 16, Williams defeated Patty Schnyder in two comfortable sets to advance to the quarterfinals. In the last 8, Williams took on adversary Jennifer Capriati, Williams dominated the 1st set with two breaks. Capriati then came back to win the second set. Capriati then took the final set to send Williams packing. However, the match was full of intrigue as several bad calls were made in the match against Williams. An overrule was made by chair umpire Mariana Alves in Capriati's favor, even though later video review showed this to be an error (as William's shot was well-inside the court). This was one of several calls that incorrectly went against Williams throughout the match. Williams attempted to argue the call, but was not successful. Capriati won the match, but tournament officials dismissed the umpire from the tournament. The controversy renewed calls for the adoption of technology like the MacCam and Hawk-Eye systems.

=== Asian and indoor season ===
==== China Open ====
Williams's next tournament was the inaugural China Open. She received a bye in the first round and faced Dinara Safina and was pushed by her 60th-ranked opponent to a third set, which Williams won in four. In the quarterfinals, she faced Nadia Petrova; however, Petrova retired while Williams was leading by a set and a break. In the final four, Williams took on another Russian, Vera Zvonareva, and won in straight sets. In the final, Williams faced her fourth Russian opponent in US Open champion Svetlana Kuznetsova, making Williams take on only Russians in the event. Kuznetsova took the first set, by breaking Williams in the tenth game. Williams then saved a match point in the second and broke her Russian foe in the eleventh game and served it out in the following game. In the third set, Williams raced through the first four game; however, Kuznetsova won four of the next five games. Williams served it out in the tenth game, to end Kuznetsova's 14-match winning streak and win her second title of the year.

==== Generali Ladies Linz ====
After withdrawing from Porsche Tennis Grand Prix and Zurich Open, Williams chose to compete at the Generali Ladies Linz despite being unwell and hampered still by a knee injury. Williams received a bye and faced Russian Alina Jidkova. Williams lost the first set in a tie-break and eventually lost the second set and the match at two.

==== WTA Tour Championships ====
Williams qualified for the Season Ending Championships and was placed in the Red Group with world no. 1 Lindsay Davenport, Anastasia Myskina, and Elena Dementieva. Williams played her first round robin match against 5th-ranked Dementieva. Williams scraped through in straight sets, winning the first set in a tie-break and the second set in the twelfth game. In her second round robin, Williams took on another Russian and French Open champion, Myskina. Myskina took a set and the first three games of the second set. However, Williams took six games in a row to push it to a third. Williams then took the third set in the tenth game. In her final round robin, Williams faced Davenport. Williams took the first set; however, Davenport pegged back, winning a tightly contested second set. Davenport then closed out the final set, letting Williams win only a game. Despite the loss, Williams came through to the semifinals, while Davenport was eliminated. In the semifinals, Williams took on Amélie Mauresmo, her French opponent won the first set. However, Williams came back and won the second set in a tie-break. Williams then closed out the final set at four to advance to the final. In the championship match, Williams took on Maria Sharapova in a rematch of the Wimbledon final. The pair traded the first two sets. Williams aggravated an already-existing abdominal injury at the end of the second set that limited her service motion. Williams took the first four games; however, Sharapova took the last six games, to earn her second win over the younger Williams.

== All matches ==
=== Singles matches ===
Tournament	Match	Round	Opponent	Rank	Result	Score
NASDAQ-100 Open; Key Biscayne, Miami, USA; WTA Tier I Hard; 21 March - 4 April 2004	–	1R	Bye			
NASDAQ-100 Open; Key Biscayne, Miami, USA; WTA Tier I Hard; 21 March - 4 April 2004	296	2R	(Spain) Marta Marrero	#83	Win	6–1, 6–0
NASDAQ-100 Open; Key Biscayne, Miami, USA; WTA Tier I Hard; 21 March - 4 April 2004	297	3R	(Russia) Elena Likhovtseva	#42	Win	6–1, 4–6, 6–3
NASDAQ-100 Open; Key Biscayne, Miami, USA; WTA Tier I Hard; 21 March - 4 April 2004	298	4R	(Russia) Maria Sharapova	#23	Win	6–4, 6–3
NASDAQ-100 Open; Key Biscayne, Miami, USA; WTA Tier I Hard; 21 March - 4 April 2004	299	QF	(United States) Jill Craybas	#63	Win	6–0, 6–1
NASDAQ-100 Open; Key Biscayne, Miami, USA; WTA Tier I Hard; 21 March - 4 April 2004	300	SF	(Greece) Eleni Daniilidou	#35	Win	6–4, 6-4
NASDAQ-100 Open; Key Biscayne, Miami, USA; WTA Tier I Hard; 21 March - 4 April 2004	301	F	(Russia) Elena Dementieva	#8	Win	6–1, 6–1
Bausch & Lomb Championships; Amelia Island, USA; WTA Tier II; Clay, Green; 5–11 April 2004	–	1R	Bye			
Bausch & Lomb Championships; Amelia Island, USA; WTA Tier II; Clay, Green; 5–11 April 2004	302	2R	(France) Mary Pierce	#29	Win	6–3, 6–1
Bausch & Lomb Championships; Amelia Island, USA; WTA Tier II; Clay, Green; 5–11 April 2004	303	3R	(Croatia) Karolina Šprem	#34	Win	6–1, 7–5
Bausch & Lomb Championships; Amelia Island, USA; WTA Tier II; Clay, Green; 5–11 April 2004	304	QF	(Russia) Nadia Petrova	#9	Loss	2–6, 3–6
Family Circle Cup; Charleston, USA; WTA Tier I Clay, Green; 12–18 April 2004	–	1R	Bye			
Family Circle Cup; Charleston, USA; WTA Tier I Clay, Green; 12–18 April 2004	305	2R	(United States) Kelly McCain	#176	Win	6–1, 6–0
Family Circle Cup; Charleston, USA; WTA Tier I Clay, Green; 12–18 April 2004	–	3R	(Spain) Conchita Martínez	#24	Withdrew	N/A
Internazionali BNL d'Italia; Rome, Italy; WTA Tier I Clay, Red; 10–16 May 2004	–	1R	Bye			
Internazionali BNL d'Italia; Rome, Italy; WTA Tier I Clay, Red; 10–16 May 2004	306	2R	(Spain) María Sánchez Lorenzo	#38	Win	7–5, 6–3
Internazionali BNL d'Italia; Rome, Italy; WTA Tier I Clay, Red; 10–16 May 2004	307	3R	(Madagascar) Dally Randriantefy	#97	Win	6–1, 6–3
Internazionali BNL d'Italia; Rome, Italy; WTA Tier I Clay, Red; 10–16 May 2004	308	QF	(Russia) Svetlana Kuznetsova	#12	Win	7–5, 6–0
Internazionali BNL d'Italia; Rome, Italy; WTA Tier I Clay, Red; 10–16 May 2004	309	SF	(United States) Jennifer Capriati	#9	Loss	4–6, 4-6
French Open; Paris, France; Grand Slam; Grass; 24 May - 6 June 2004	310	1R	(Czech Republic) Iveta Benešová	#51	Win	6–2, 6–2
French Open; Paris, France; Grand Slam; Grass; 24 May - 6 June 2004	311	2R	(Russia) Maria Kirilenko	#100	Win	4–6, 6–2, 6–4
French Open; Paris, France; Grand Slam; Grass; 24 May - 6 June 2004	312	3R	(Croatia) Silvija Talaja	#106	Win	6–0, 6–4
French Open; Paris, France; Grand Slam; Grass; 24 May - 6 June 2004	313	4R	(Japan) Shinobu Asagoe	#52	Win	6–3, 6–1
French Open; Paris, France; Grand Slam; Grass; 24 May - 6 June 2004	314	QF	(United States) Jennifer Capriati	#6	Loss	3–6, 6–2, 3–6
Wimbledon; London, United Kingdom; Grand Slam; Grass; 21 June - 4 July 2004	315	1R	(China) Zheng Jie	#51	Win	6–3, 6–1
Wimbledon; London, United Kingdom; Grand Slam; Grass; 21 June - 4 July 2004	316	2R	(France) Stéphanie Foretz Gacon	#135	Win	6–0, 6–4
Wimbledon; London, United Kingdom; Grand Slam; Grass; 21 June - 4 July 2004	317	3R	(Spain) Magüi Serna	#53	Win	6–4, 6–0
Wimbledon; London, United Kingdom; Grand Slam; Grass; 21 June - 4 July 2004	318	4R	(France) Tatiana Golovin	#54	Win	6–2, 6–1
Wimbledon; London, United Kingdom; Grand Slam; Grass; 21 June - 4 July 2004	319	QF	(United States) Jennifer Capriati	#7	Win	6–1, 6–1
Wimbledon; London, United Kingdom; Grand Slam; Grass; 21 June - 4 July 2004	320	SF	(France) Amélie Mauresmo	#4	Win	6–7^{(4–7)}, 7–5, 6–4
Wimbledon; London, United Kingdom; Grand Slam; Grass; 21 June - 4 July 2004	321	F	(Russia) Maria Sharapova	#15	Loss	1–6, 4–6
JPMorgan Chase Open; Los Angeles, United States; WTA Tier II; Hard; 19–25 July 2004	–	1R	Bye			
JPMorgan Chase Open; Los Angeles, United States; WTA Tier II; Hard; 19–25 July 2004	322	2R	(Greece) Eleni Daniilidou	#33	Win	6–1, 7–6^{(7–3)}
JPMorgan Chase Open; Los Angeles, United States; WTA Tier II; Hard; 19–25 July 2004	323	3R	(Spain) Arantxa Sánchez Vicario	#60	Win	6–0, 6–3
JPMorgan Chase Open; Los Angeles, United States; WTA Tier II; Hard; 19–25 July 2004	324	QF	(Russia) Vera Zvonareva	#14	Win	4–6, 6–3, 6–3
JPMorgan Chase Open; Los Angeles, United States; WTA Tier II; Hard; 19–25 July 2004	325	SF	(Russia) Elena Dementieva	#6	Win	6–3, 7–6^{(7-4)}
JPMorgan Chase Open; Los Angeles, United States; WTA Tier II; Hard; 19–25 July 2004	326	F	(United States) Lindsay Davenport	#5	Loss	1–6, 3–6
Acura Classic; San Diego, United States; WTA Tier I Hard; 25 July – 1 August 2004	–	1R	Bye			
Acura Classic; San Diego, United States; WTA Tier I Hard; 25 July – 1 August 2004	327	2R	(Serbia and Montenegro) Jelena Janković	#44	Win	6–7^{(3–7)}, 6–3, 6–2
Acura Classic; San Diego, United States; WTA Tier I Hard; 25 July – 1 August 2004	328	3R	(Russia) Elena Bovina	#22	Win	6–4, 6–2
Acura Classic; San Diego, United States; WTA Tier I Hard; 25 July – 1 August 2004	–	QF	(Russia) Vera Zvonareva	#15	Withdrew	N/A
US Open; New York City, United States; Grand Slam; Hard, outdoor 30 August - 12 September 2004	329	1R	(Czech Republic) Sandra Kleinová	#84	Win	6–1, 6–3
US Open; New York City, United States; Grand Slam; Hard, outdoor 30 August - 12 September 2004	330	2R	(United States) Lindsay Lee-Waters	#86	Win	6–4, 6–3
US Open; New York City, United States; Grand Slam; Hard, outdoor 30 August - 12 September 2004	331	3R	(France) Tatiana Golovin	#31	Win	7–5, 6–4
US Open; New York City, United States; Grand Slam; Hard, outdoor 30 August - 12 September 2004	332	4R	(Switzerland) Patty Schnyder	#16	Win	6–4, 6–2
US Open; New York City, United States; Grand Slam; Hard, outdoor 30 August - 12 September 2004	333	QF	(United States) Jennifer Capriati	#8	Loss	6–2, 4–6, 4–6
China Open; Beijing, China; WTA Tier II; Hard; 20–26 September 2004	–	1R	Bye			
China Open; Beijing, China; WTA Tier II; Hard; 20–26 September 2004	334	2R	(Russia) Dinara Safina	#60	Win	6–4, 3–6, 6–4
China Open; Beijing, China; WTA Tier II; Hard; 20–26 September 2004	335	QF	(Russia) Nadia Petrova	#13	Win	6–2, 4–1 Ret
China Open; Beijing, China; WTA Tier II; Hard; 20–26 September 2004	336	SF	(Russia) Vera Zvonareva	#11	Win	6–2, 6–3
China Open; Beijing, China; WTA Tier II; Hard; 20–26 September 2004	337	F	(Russia) Svetlana Kuznetsova	#5	Win	4–6, 7–5, 6–4
Generali Ladies Linz; Linz, Austria; WTA Tier II; Hard (i); 25–31 October 2004	–	1R	Bye			
Generali Ladies Linz; Linz, Austria; WTA Tier II; Hard (i); 25–31 October 2004	338	2R	(Russia) Alina Jidkova	#73	Loss	6–7^{(5–7)}, 2–6
WTA Tour Championships; Los Angeles, United States; Year-End Championship; Hard, indoor 8 – 14 November 2012	339	RR	(Russia) Elena Dementieva	#5	Win	7–6^{(7–3)}, 7–5
WTA Tour Championships; Los Angeles, United States; Year-End Championship; Hard, indoor 8 – 14 November 2012	340	RR	(Russia) Anastasia Myskina	#3	Win	4–6, 6–3, 6–4
WTA Tour Championships; Los Angeles, United States; Year-End Championship; Hard, indoor 8 – 14 November 2012	341	RR	(United States) Lindsay Davenport	#1	Loss	6–3, 5–7, 1–6
WTA Tour Championships; Los Angeles, United States; Year-End Championship; Hard, indoor 8 – 14 November 2012	342	SF	(France) Amélie Mauresmo	#2	Win	4–6, 7–6^{(7–2)}, 6–4
WTA Tour Championships; Los Angeles, United States; Year-End Championship; Hard, indoor 8 – 14 November 2012	343	F	(Russia) Maria Sharapova	#6	Loss	6–4, 2–6, 4–6

== Tournament schedule ==
=== Singles schedule ===
Williams' 2004 singles tournament schedule is as follows:

Date	Championship	Location	Category	Surface	Points	Outcome
21 March 2004 – 4 April 2004	NASDAQ-100 Open	Miami (USA)	WTA Tier I	Hard	325	Winner defeated Elena Dementieva 6–1, 6–1
5 April 2004 – 11 April 2004	Bausch & Lomb Championships	Amelia Islands (USA)	WTA Tier II	Clay (green)	49	Quarterfinals lost to Elena Dementieva 2–6, 3–6
12 April 2004 – 18 April 2004	Family Circle Cup	Charleston (USA)	WTA Tier I	Clay (green)	42	Third Round; Withdrew before match against Conchita Martínez
10 May 2004 – 16 May 2004	Internazionali BNL d'Italia	Rome (ITA)	WTA Tier I	Clay	135	Semifinals lost to Jennifer Capriati 4–6, 4–6
24 May 2004 – 6 June 2004	French Open	Paris (FRA)	Grand Slam	Clay	162	Quarterfinals lost to Jennifer Capriati, 3–6, 6–2, 3–6
21 June 2004 – 4 July 2004	Wimbledon Championships	London (GBR)	Grand Slam	Grass	456	Final lost to Maria Sharapova, 1–6, 4–6
19 July 2004 – 25 July 2004	JPMorgan Chase Open	Los Angeles (USA)	WTA Tier II	Hard	137	Final lost to Lindsay Davenport, 1–6, 3–6
26 July 2004 – 1 August 2004	Acura Classic	San Diego (USA)	WTA Tier I	Hard	75	Quarterfinals; Withdrew before match against Vera Zvonareva
30 August 2004 – 12 September 2004	US Open	New York (USA)	Grand Slam	Hard	162	Quarterfinals lost to Jennifer Capriati, 6–2, 4–6, 4–6
20 September 2004 – 26 September 2004	China Open	Beijing (CHN)	WTA Tier II	Hard	195	Winner defeated Svetlana Kuznetsova, 4–6, 7–5, 6–4
25 October 2004 – 31 October 2004	Generali Ladies Linz	Linz (AUT)	WTA Tier II	Hard (i)	1	Second Round lost to Alina Jidkova 6–7^{(5–7)}, 2–6
8 November 2004 – 14 November 2004	2004 WTA Tour Championships	Los Angeles (USA)	Year-End Championship	Hard (i)	340	Final lost to Maria Sharapova 6–4, 2–6, 4–6
Total year-end points					2079	

== Yearly records ==
=== Head–to–head matchups ===
Ordered by percentage of wins

- (Russia) Elena Dementieva 3–0
- (Greece) Eleni Daniilidou 2–0
- (France) Tatiana Golovin 2–0
- (Russia) Svetlana Kuznetsova 2–0
- (France) Amélie Mauresmo 2–0
- (Russia) Vera Zvonareva 2–0
- (Spain) Marta Marrero 1–0
- (Russia) Elena Likhovtseva 1–0
- (United States) Jill Craybas 1–0
- (France) Mary Pierce 1–0
- (United States) Kelly McCain 1–0
- (Spain) María Sánchez Lorenzo 1–0
- (Madagascar) Dally Randriantefy 1–0
- (China) Zheng Jie 1–0
- (France) Stéphanie Foretz Gacon 1–0
- (Spain) Magüi Serna 1–0
- (Spain) Arantxa Sánchez Vicario 1–0
- (Russia) Elena Bovina 1–0
- (Czech Republic) Sandra Kleinová 1–0
- (Croatia) Karolina Šprem 1–0
- (Serbia and Montenegro) Jelena Janković 1–0
- (United States) Lindsay Lee-Waters 1–0
- (Switzerland) Patty Schnyder 1–0
- (Russia) Dinara Safina 1–0
- (Russia) Anastasia Myskina 1–0
- (Russia) Nadia Petrova 1–1
- (Russia) Maria Sharapova 1–2
- (United States) Jennifer Capriati 1–3
- (Russia) Alina Jidkova 0–1
- (United States) Lindsay Davenport 0–2

=== Finals ===
==== Singles: 5 (2–3) ====
Legend Grand Slam (0–1) Year-End Championships (0–1) WTA Tier I (1–0) WTA Tier II (1–1)	Finals by surface Hard (2–2) Grass (0–1)	Finals by venue Outdoors (2–2) Indoors (0–1)

Outcome	No.	Date	Championship	Surface	Opponent in the final	Score in the final
Winner	24.	April 4, 2004	Miami, US (3)	Hard	(Russia) Elena Dementieva	6–1, 6–1
Runner-up	8.	June 21, 2004	Wimbledon, London, UK (1)	Grass	(Russia) Maria Sharapova	1–6, 4–6
Runner-up	9.	July 19, 2004	Los Angeles, US (1)	Hard	(United States) Lindsay Davenport	1–6, 3–6
Winner	25.	September 26, 2004	Beijing, China (1)	Hard	(Russia) Svetlana Kuznetsova	4–6, 7–5, 6–4
Runner-up	10.	November 8, 2004	WTA Tour Championships, Los Angeles, US (2)	Hard (i)	(Russia) Maria Sharapova	6–4, 2–6, 4–6

=== Earnings ===
#	Event	Prize money	Year-to-date
1	NASDAQ-100 Open	$400,000	$400,000
2	Bausch & Lomb Championships	$12,700	$412,700
3	Family Circle Cup	$12,775	$425,775
4	Internazionali BNL d'Italia	$48,600	$474,375
5	French Open	$113,677	$588,052
6	Wimbledon Championships	$444,502	$1,032,554
7	JPMorgan Chase Open	$47,800	$1,080,054
8	Acura Classic	$25,600	$1,105,654
9	US Open	$118,544	$1,224,198
10	China Open	$93,000	$1,317,198
11	Generali Ladies Linz	$7,600	$1,324,798
12	WTA Tour Championships	$500,000	$1,824,798
Bonus Pool		$427,000	$2,251,798
			$2,251,798

Figures in United States dollars (USD) unless noted.

== See also ==
- 2004 Maria Sharapova tennis season
- 2004 WTA Tour

Sporting positions
Preceded by Venus Williams; Angelique Kerber	World No. 1 First stint: July 8, 2002 – August 10, 2003; Last stint: April 24, 2017 – May 14, 2017	Succeeded by Kim Clijsters; Angelique Kerber
Preceded by Jennifer Capriati; Justine Henin; Petra Kvitová	Year-end World No. 1; 2002; 2008, 2009; 2012 – 2015	Succeeded by Justine Henin; Kim Clijsters; Angelique Kerber
Awards
Preceded by Jennifer Capriati; Jelena Janković; Petra Kvitová	ITF Women's Singles World Champion; 2002; 2009; 2012 – 2015	Succeeded by Justine Henin; Caroline Wozniacki; Angelique Kerber
Preceded by Martina Hingis & Anna Kournikova; Cara Black & Liezel Huber	WTA Doubles Team of the Year; 2000 (with Venus Williams); 2009 (with Venus Williams)	Succeeded by Lisa Raymond & Rennae Stubbs; Gisela Dulko & Flavia Pennetta
Preceded by Cara Black & Liezel Huber	ITF Women's Doubles World Champion; 2009 (with Venus Williams)	Succeeded by Gisela Dulko & Flavia Pennetta
