= 2004 Maria Sharapova tennis season =

- Full name: Maria Sharapova
- Country: Russia
- Calendar prize money: $2,506,263

Singles
- Calendar titles: 5
- Year-end ranking: No. 4
- Ranking change from previous year: ▲28

Grand Slam & significant results
- Australian Open: 3R
- French Open: QF
- Wimbledon: W
- US Open: 3R
- Olympic Games: DNP
- Last updated on: 3 February 2013.

Results and statistics from Maria Sharapova's 2004 tennis season.

== Yearly summary ==
=== Australian Open series ===
Sharapova began her season at the Australian Open, as the 28th seed. She lost in the third round to Anastasia Myskina.

=== Indian Wells & Miami ===
Sharapova played three matches at Indian Wells and three at Miami.

| 10‑Mar‑2004 | Indian Wells | Hard | R16 | 24 | 5 | (4)Anastasia Myskina [RUS] d. (16)Sharapova | 6-2 6-1 |
| 10‑Mar‑2004 | Indian Wells | Hard | R32 | 24 | 282 | (16)Sharapova d. (WC)Sesil Karatantcheva [KAZ] | 3-6 6-3 6-2 |
| 10‑Mar‑2004 | Indian Wells | Hard | R64 | 24 | 80 | (16)Sharapova d. Flavia Pennetta [ITA] | 6-3 4-6 6-4 |

| 24‑Mar‑2004 | Miami | Hard | R16 | 23 | 6 | (1)Serena Williams [USA] d. (17)Sharapova | 6-4 6-3 |
| 24‑Mar‑2004 | Miami | Hard | R32 | 23 | 19 | (17)Sharapova d. (13)Anna Smashnova [ISR] | 7-5 6-2 |
| 24‑Mar‑2004 | Miami | Hard | R64 | 23 | 50 | (17)Sharapova d. Shinobu Asagoe [JPN] | 6-2 3-6 6-0 |

=== European clay court season ===
Sharapova reached her first Major quarter-final at the French Open, defeating 2003 quarter-finalist Vera Zvonareva en route. She eventually lost in the quarter-finals to Paola Suárez.

=== Grass court season ===
Sharapova won her first title for the year in Birmingham, defeating Tatiana Golovin in the final in three sets. At Wimbledon, Sharapova was seeded 13th, meaning she could have faced a potential fourth round meeting against the French Open champion, Anastasia Myskina, who had defeated her in Australia earlier in the year. However, Sharapova was able to take advantage of Myskina's early exit to reach the quarter-finals, where she dropped her first set of the tournament to Ai Sugiyama, before winning in three sets. In the semi-finals, she faced 1999 champion Lindsay Davenport, trailing by a set and a break before making a comeback to prevail in three sets after the rain appeared to halt Davenport's momentum.

The final saw Sharapova face two-time defending champion Serena Williams, who had defeated her in Miami earlier in the year, in what was their first meeting. Williams entered the match as the favourite, but Sharapova would produce a stunning straight-sets victory to become the third-youngest woman (after Lottie Dod and Martina Hingis) to triumph at Wimbledon. The victory was hailed by the media as "the most stunning upset in memory". By virtue of winning Wimbledon, Sharapova would enter the Top Ten for the first time in her career, and would remain there until January 2009, when she decided not to defend her 2008 Australian Open title due to a serious shoulder injury.

=== US Open series ===
Sharapova entered the US Open as the seventh seed, but she was defeated in the third round by Mary Pierce.

=== Fall series ===
During the fall of the season Sharapova played and won consecutive titles at the hansol korea open and at the japan tennis championships thus extending her title tally to 4 .She also reached the final of the zurich open defeating venus williams en route but eventually lost to alicia molik in three tight sets.

=== WTA Tour Championships ===
Sharapova qualified for the year-end WTA Tour Championships by virtue of her impressive season, which saw her capture four titles for the year to date. She was drawn in the Black Group along with Amélie Mauresmo, US Open champion Svetlana Kuznetsova and Vera Zvonareva. Sharapova won two of her three matches, the only loss coming to Mauresmo in her first match. Sharapova qualified for the semi-finals after finishing second in the group behind Mauresmo; thus, the semi-final saw her drawn against French Open champion and Red Group leader Anastasia Myskina, which she won in three sets.

The final saw her up against Serena Williams for the third time in the year. After losing the first set, and trailing 0–4 in the final set, Sharapova defeated her for the second (and to date last) time this year, to become the second player in WTA Tour Championships history to win the title on her first attempt (Petra Kvitová would later achieve this feat in 2011, Dominika Cibulková in 2016 and Ashleigh Barty in 2019). She would finish the year ranked World No. 4, and be recognised by the WTA as the "Player of the Year" and "Most Improved Player of the Year". Additionally, she would earn $2,506,263 in prize money, the most by any player this year.

== All matches ==
This table chronicles all the matches of Sharapova in 2004, including walkovers (W/O) which the WTA does not count as wins. They are marked ND for non-decision or no decision.

Key
| W | F | SF | QF | #R | RR | Q# | P# | DNQ | A | Z# | PO | G | S | B | NMS | NTI | P | NH |

(W) winner; (F) finalist; (SF) semifinalist; (QF) quarterfinalist; (#R) rounds 4, 3, 2, 1; (RR) round-robin stage; (Q#) qualification round; (P#) preliminary round; (DNQ) did not qualify; (A) absent; (Z#) Davis/Fed Cup Zonal Group (with number indication) or (PO) play-off; (G) gold, (S) silver or (B) bronze Olympic/Paralympic medal; (NMS) not a Masters tournament; (NTI) not a Tier I tournament; (P) postponed; (NH) not held; (SR) strike rate (events won / competed); (W–L) win–loss record.
To avoid confusion and double counting, these charts are updated at the conclusion of a tournament or when the player's participation has ended.

=== Singles matches ===
| Tournament | # | Round | Opponent | Result | Score |
Australian Open; Melbourne, Australia; Grand Slam; Hard, outdoor 19 January–1 February 2004
| Australian Open; Melbourne, Australia; Grand Slam; Hard, outdoor 19 January–1 February 2004 | 1 | 1R | (Spain) Conchita Martínez Granados | Win | 6–4, 6–3 |
| Australian Open; Melbourne, Australia; Grand Slam; Hard, outdoor 19 January–1 February 2004 | 2 | 2R | (United States) Lindsay Lee-Waters | Win | 6–1, 6–3 |
| Australian Open; Melbourne, Australia; Grand Slam; Hard, outdoor 19 January–1 February 2004 | 3 | 3R | (Russia) Anastasia Myskina | Loss | 4–6, 6–1, 2–6 |
Pacific Life Open; Indian Wells, United States of America; Tier I Hard, outdoor 10 March–21 March 2004
| Pacific Life Open; Indian Wells, United States of America; Tier I Hard, outdoor 10 March–21 March 2004 | | 1R | Bye | | |
| Pacific Life Open; Indian Wells, United States of America; Tier I Hard, outdoor 10 March–21 March 2004 | | 2R | (Italy) Flavia Pennetta | Win | 6–3, 4–6, 6–4 |
| Pacific Life Open; Indian Wells, United States of America; Tier I Hard, outdoor 10 March–21 March 2004 | | 3R | (Bulgaria) Sesil Karatantcheva | Win | 3–6, 6–3, 6–2 |
| Pacific Life Open; Indian Wells, United States of America; Tier I Hard, outdoor 10 March–21 March 2004 | | 4R | (Russia) Anastasia Myskina | Loss | 2–6, 1–6 |
NASDAQ-100 Open; Miami, United States of America; Tier I Hard, outdoor 24 March–4 April 2004
| NASDAQ-100 Open; Miami, United States of America; Tier I Hard, outdoor 24 March–4 April 2004 | | 1R | Bye | | |
| NASDAQ-100 Open; Miami, United States of America; Tier I Hard, outdoor 24 March–4 April 2004 | | 2R | (Japan) Shinobu Asagoe | Win | 6–2, 3–6, 6–0 |
| NASDAQ-100 Open; Miami, United States of America; Tier I Hard, outdoor 24 March–4 April 2004 | | 3R | (Israel) Anna Smashnova | Win | 7–5, 6–2 |
| NASDAQ-100 Open; Miami, United States of America; Tier I Hard, outdoor 24 March–4 April 2004 | | 4R | (United States) Serena Williams | Loss | 4–6, 3–6 |
French Open; Paris, France; Grand Slam; Clay, outdoor 24 May–6 June 2004
| French Open; Paris, France; Grand Slam; Clay, outdoor 24 May–6 June 2004 | | 1R | (Austria) Barbara Schwartz | Win | 6–3, 6–0 |
| French Open; Paris, France; Grand Slam; Clay, outdoor 24 May–6 June 2004 | | 2R | (Italy) Rita Grande | Win | 6–2, 6–0 |
| French Open; Paris, France; Grand Slam; Clay, outdoor 24 May–6 June 2004 | | 3R | (Russia) Vera Zvonareva | Win | 6–3, 7–6^{(7–3)} |
| French Open; Paris, France; Grand Slam; Clay, outdoor 24 May–6 June 2004 | | 4R | (Germany) Marlene Weingärtner | Win | 6–3, 6–1 |
| French Open; Paris, France; Grand Slam; Clay, outdoor 24 May–6 June 2004 | | QF | (Argentina) Paola Suárez | Loss | 1–6, 3–6 |
Wimbledon; London, Great Britain; Grand Slam; Grass, outdoor 21 June–3 July 2004
| Wimbledon; London, Great Britain; Grand Slam; Grass, outdoor 21 June–3 July 2004 | | 1R | (Ukraine) Yuliya Beygelzimer | Win | 6–2, 6–1 |
| Wimbledon; London, Great Britain; Grand Slam; Grass, outdoor 21 June–3 July 2004 | | 2R | (United Kingdom) Anne Keothavong | Win | 6–4, 6–0 |
| Wimbledon; London, Great Britain; Grand Slam; Grass, outdoor 21 June–3 July 2004 | | 3R | (Slovakia) Daniela Hantuchová | Win | 6–3, 6–1 |
| Wimbledon; London, Great Britain; Grand Slam; Grass, outdoor 21 June–3 July 2004 | | 4R | (United States) Amy Frazier | Win | 6–4, 7–5 |
| Wimbledon; London, Great Britain; Grand Slam; Grass, outdoor 21 June–3 July 2004 | | QF | (Japan) Ai Sugiyama | Win | 5–7, 7–5, 6–1 |
| Wimbledon; London, Great Britain; Grand Slam; Grass, outdoor 21 June–3 July 2004 | | SF | (United States) Lindsay Davenport | Win | 2–6, 7–6^{(7–5)}, 6–1 |
| Wimbledon; London, Great Britain; Grand Slam; Grass, outdoor 21 June–3 July 2004 | | W | (United States) Serena Williams | Win (2) | 6–1, 6–4 |
US Open; New York City, United States of America; Grand Slam; Hard, outdoor 30 August–12 September 2004
| US Open; New York City, United States of America; Grand Slam; Hard, outdoor 30 August–12 September 2004 | | 1R | (United States) Laura Granville | Win | 6–3, 5–7, 7–5 |
| US Open; New York City, United States of America; Grand Slam; Hard, outdoor 30 August–12 September 2004 | | 2R | (Serbia and Montenegro) Jelena Janković | Win | 6–0, 7–6^{(7–5)}, 6–1 |
| US Open; New York City, United States of America; Grand Slam; Hard, outdoor 30 August–12 September 2004 | | 3R | (France) Mary Pierce | Loss | 6–2, 2–6, 3–6 |
China Open; Beijing, China; Tier II; Hard, outdoor 20 September–26 September 2004
| China Open; Beijing, China; Tier II; Hard, outdoor 20 September–26 September 2004 | | 1R | Bye | | |
| China Open; Beijing, China; Tier II; Hard, outdoor 20 September–26 September 2004 | | 2R | (Russia) Tatiana Panova | Win | 6–1, 6–1 |
| China Open; Beijing, China; Tier II; Hard, outdoor 20 September–26 September 2004 | | QF | (Serbia and Montenegro) Jelena Janković | Win | 5–2, ret. |
| China Open; Beijing, China; Tier II; Hard, outdoor 20 September–26 September 2004 | | SF | (Russia) Svetlana Kuznetsova | Loss | 2–6, 2–6 |
WTA Tour Championships; Los Angeles, United States of America; WTA Tour Championships; Hard, indoor 8–13 November 2004
| WTA Tour Championships; Los Angeles, United States of America; WTA Tour Championships; Hard, indoor 8–13 November 2004 | | RR | (France) Amélie Mauresmo | Loss | 5–7, 4–6 |
| WTA Tour Championships; Los Angeles, United States of America; WTA Tour Championships; Hard, indoor 8–13 November 2004 | | RR | (Russia) Svetlana Kuznetsova | Win | 6–1, 6–4 |
| WTA Tour Championships; Los Angeles, United States of America; WTA Tour Championships; Hard, indoor 8–13 November 2004 | | RR | (Russia) Vera Zvonareva | Win | 6–4, 7–5 |
| WTA Tour Championships; Los Angeles, United States of America; WTA Tour Championships; Hard, indoor 8–13 November 2004 | | SF | (Russia) Anastasia Myskina | Win | 2–6, 6–2, 6–2 |
| WTA Tour Championships; Los Angeles, United States of America; WTA Tour Championships; Hard, indoor 8–13 November 2004 | | W | (United States) Serena Williams | Win (5) | 4–6, 6–2, 6–4 |

== Tournament schedule ==
=== Singles Schedule ===
| Date | Championship | Location | Category | Surface | Prev. result | New result | Outcome |
|---|---|---|---|---|---|---|---|
| 19 January 2004– 1 February 2004 | Australian Open | Melbourne (AUS) | Grand Slam tournament | Hard | 1R | 3R | Lost in the third round against Anastasia Myskina |
| 10 March 2004– 21 March 2004 | Pacific Life Open | Indian Wells (USA) | Tier I | Hard | 1R | 4R | Lost in the fourth round against Anastasia Myskina |
| 24 March 2004– 4 April 2004 | NASDAQ-100 Open | Miami (USA) | Tier I | Hard | 1R | 4R | Lost in the fourth round against Serena Williams |
| 24 May 2004– 6 June 2004 | French Open | Paris (FRA) | Grand Slam tournament | Clay | 1R | QF | Lost in the quarterfinals against Paola Suárez |
| 21 June 2004– 3 July 2004 | The Championships, Wimbledon | London (GBR) | Grand Slam tournament | Grass | 4R | W | Won in the final against Serena Williams |
| 30 August 2004– 12 September 2004 | US Open | New York (USA) | Grand Slam tournament | Hard | 2R | 3R | Lost in the third round against Mary Pierce |
| 20 September 2004– 26 September 2004 | China Open | Beijing (CHN) | Tier II | Hard | DNP | SF | Lost in the semi-finals against Svetlana Kuznetsova |
| 8 November 2004– 13 November 2004 | WTA Tour Championships | Los Angeles (USA) | WTA Tour Championships | Hard | DNQ | W | Won in the final against Serena Williams |

== Yearly Records ==
=== Finals ===
==== Singles: 6 (5–1) ====
| Category Grand Slam (1–0) WTA Tier I (0–1) WTA Tier III (1–0) WTA Tier IV (2–0) WTA Tour Championships (1–0) | Titles by surface Hard (4–1) Grass (1–0) | Titles by conditions Outdoors (4–0) Indoors (1–1) |

| Outcome | No. | Date | Championship | Surface | Opponent in the final | Score in the final |
|---|---|---|---|---|---|---|
| Winner | 2. | June 13, 2004 | (United Kingdom) Birmingham, Great Britain (1) | Grass | (France) Tatiana Golovin | 4–6, 6–2, 6–1 |
| Winner | 3. | July 3, 2004 | (United Kingdom) London, Great Britain (1) | Grass | (United States) Serena Williams | 6–1, 6–4 |
| Winner | 4. | October 3, 2004 | Seoul, South Korea (1) | Hard | (Poland) Marta Domachowska | 6–1, 6–1 |
| Winner | 5. | October 10, 2004 | Tokyo, Japan (2) | Hard | (United States) Mashona Washington | 6–0, 6–1 |
| Runner-up | 1. | October 24, 2004 | Zurich Open, Switzerland (1) | Hard (i) | (Australia) Alicia Molik | 3–6, 4–6 |
| Winner | 6. | November 13, 2004 | (United States) Los Angeles, USA (1) | Hard (i) | (United States) Serena Williams | 4–6, 6–2, 6–4 |

== See also ==
- 2004 Serena Williams tennis season
- 2004 WTA Tour
