= 2005 NASDAQ-100 Open =

- Date: March 21 – April 3
- Edition: 21st
- Category: ATP Masters Series (men); Tier I Series (women)
- Surface: Hard / outdoor
- Location: Key Biscayne, Florida, U.S.
- Venue: Tennis Center at Crandon Park

Champions

Men's singles
- (Switzerland) Roger Federer

Women's singles
- (Belgium) Kim Clijsters

Men's doubles
- (Sweden) Jonas Björkman / (Belarus) Max Mirnyi

Women's doubles
- (Russia) Svetlana Kuznetsova / (Australia) Alicia Molik
← 2004 ·	Miami Open	· 2006 →

The 2005 Miami Masters (also known as the NASDAQ-100 Open for sponsorship reasons) was a tennis tournament played on outdoor hard courts. It was the 21st edition of this tournament, and was part of the ATP Masters Series of the 2005 ATP Tour, and of the Tier I Series of the 2005 WTA Tour. Both the men's and the women's events took place at the Tennis Center at Crandon Park in Key Biscayne, Florida, United States, from March 21 through April 3, 2005.

== Finals ==
=== Men's singles ===
(Switzerland) Roger Federer defeated (Spain) Rafael Nadal, 2–6, 6–7^{(4–7)}, 7–6^{(7–5)}, 6–3, 6–1

=== Women's singles ===
(Belgium) Kim Clijsters defeated (Russia) Maria Sharapova, 6–3, 7–5

=== Men's doubles ===
(Sweden) Jonas Björkman & (Belarus) Max Mirnyi defeated (Zimbabwe) Wayne Black & (Zimbabwe) Kevin Ullyett, 6–1, 6–2

=== Women's doubles ===
(Russia) Svetlana Kuznetsova & (Australia) Alicia Molik defeated (United States) Lisa Raymond & (Australia) Rennae Stubbs, 7–5, 6–7^{(5–7)}, 6–2
