= 2005 NASDAQ-100 Open – Men's singles =

Men's singles
- 2005 NASDAQ-100 Open

Final
- Champion: (Switzerland) Roger Federer
- Runner-up: (Spain) Rafael Nadal
- Score: 2–6, 6–7^{(4–7)}, 7–6^{(7–5)}, 6–3, 6–1

Details
- Draw: 96 (12Q / 5WC / 1LL)
- Seeds: 32

Events
Singles	men	women
Doubles	men	women
- Miami Open

Roger Federer defeated Rafael Nadal in the final, 2–6, 6–7^{(4–7)}, 7–6^{(7–5)}, 6–3, 6–1 to win the men's singles tennis title at the 2005 Miami Open. It was the first of 24 tournament-final matches between the pair. Federer completed the Sunshine Double with the win; it would be the first of three Sunshine Doubles in his career (followed by 2006 and 2017).

Andy Roddick was the defending champion, but retired from his second-round match due to a wrist injury.

Rafael Nadal's defeat in the 2005 Miami Open final is one of the most debated matches in tennis history. Many fans argue he was robbed after an incorrect line call in the third set shifted the match momentum, allowing Roger Federer to pull off a historic comeback. An 18-year-old Nadal was playing his first ATP Masters 1000 final and had Federer on the ropes, leading 2-6, 6-7(4), 3-4. With Federer serving 3–4 down in the third set, Nadal had a 30–0 advantage. Federer hit a forehand that appeared to land several inches wide. The linesperson and the umpire did not call it out, denying Nadal a 40–0 lead with three break points which would have won him the game as Nadal won the third point after that. Hawk-Eye challenges did not exist at the time, leaving Nadal visibly frustrated with no way to appeal the decision. Federer won the game, held his momentum, and secured the third-set tiebreaker. An exhausted Nadal physically faded in the final two sets, ultimately losing 2-6, 6-7(4), 7-6(5), 6-3, 6–1 after three hours and 43 minutes. While the blown call remains a massive "what-if" for his fans, the loss essentially sparked his legendary 81-match winning streak on clay that began weeks later.

== Seeds ==
All thirty-two seeds received a bye to the second round.

1. (Switzerland) Roger Federer (champion)
2. (United States) Andy Roddick (second round, retired because of a wrist injury)
3. (Russia) Marat Safin (third round)
4. (Argentina) Guillermo Coria (third round)
5. (Spain) Carlos Moyà (third round)
6. (United Kingdom) Tim Henman (quarterfinals)
7. (Argentina) Gastón Gaudio (fourth round)
8. (Argentina) David Nalbandian (third round)
9. (United States) Andre Agassi (semifinals)
10. (Sweden) Joachim Johansson (second round)
11. (Argentina) Guillermo Cañas (second round)
12. (Spain) Tommy Robredo (third round, withdrew because of a neck injury)
13. (Croatia) Ivan Ljubičić (fourth round)
14. (Russia) Nikolay Davydenko (second round)
15. (Chile) Fernando González (third round)
16. (Germany) Tommy Haas (third round)
17. (Russia) Mikhail Youzhny (second round)
18. (Croatia) Mario Ančić (fourth round)
19. (Spain) Feliciano López (second round)
20. (Romania) Andrei Pavel (second round)
21. (United States) Vincent Spadea (third round)
22. (Germany) Nicolas Kiefer (second round)
23. (Czech Republic) Radek Štěpánek (fourth round)
24. (Czech Republic) Jiří Novák (fourth round)
25. (Sweden) Thomas Johansson (quarterfinals)
26. (Slovakia) Dominik Hrbatý (quarterfinals)
27. (France) Sébastien Grosjean (third round)
28. (Argentina) Juan Ignacio Chela (third round)
29. (Spain) Rafael Nadal (final)
30. (Thailand) Paradorn Srichaphan (second round)
31. (United States) Taylor Dent (quarterfinals)
32. (Belgium) Xavier Malisse (second round)

== Draw ==
Key

- Q = Qualifier
- WC = Wild card
- LL = Lucky loser
- Alt = Alternate
- ITF = ITF entry
- PR = Protected ranking
- SR = Special ranking
- SE = Special exempt
- JE = Junior exempt
- JR = Junior Accelerator Programme entrant
- CO = College Accelerator Programme entrant
- NG = Next Gen Accelerator Program entrant
- w/o = Walkover
- r = Retired
- d = Defaulted

=== Finals ===
Quarterfinals
1	(Switzerland) Roger Federer	6	6
6	(United Kingdom) Tim Henman	4	2
31	(United States) Taylor Dent	5	0
9	(United States) Andre Agassi	7	6
(Spain) David Ferrer	6	6
26	(Slovakia) Dominik Hrbatý	2	3
25	(Sweden) Thomas Johansson	2	4
29	(Spain) Rafael Nadal	6	6

Semifinals
1	(Switzerland) Roger Federer	6	6
9	(United States) Andre Agassi	4	3
(Spain) David Ferrer	4	3
29	(Spain) Rafael Nadal	6	6

Final
1	(Switzerland) Roger Federer	2	6^{4}	7^{7}	6	6
29	(Spain) Rafael Nadal	6	7^{7}	6^{5}	3	1

=== Top half ===
==== Section 1 ====
First round
(Croatia) I Karlović	7	6^{5}	6^{3}
(Belgium) O Rochus	5	7^{7}	7^{7}
(Luxembourg) G Müller	4	2
(Argentina) M Zabaleta	6	6
(Brazil) R Mello	6	1
(Spain) S Ventura	0	0^{r}
Q	(Czech Republic) T Zíb	6^{2}	7^{7}	3
(United States) M Fish	7^{7}	6^{3}	6

Second round
1	(Switzerland) R Federer	6	6
(Belgium) O Rochus	3	1
(Argentina) M Zabaleta	7^{7}	6
30	(Thailand) P Srichaphan	6^{5}	3
18	(Croatia) M Ančić	6	6
(Brazil) R Mello	1	4
(United States) M Fish	6^{6}	5
16	(Germany) T Haas	7^{8}	7

Third round
1	(Switzerland) R Federer	6	5	6
(Argentina) M Zabaleta	2	7	3
18	(Croatia) M Ančić	6	6
16	(Germany) T Haas	4	4

Fourth round
1	(Switzerland) R Federer	6	4	6
18	(Croatia) M Ančić	3	6	4

==== Section 2 ====
First round
(Austria) S Koubek	2	4
Q	(United States) J Morrison	6	6
(Armenia) S Sargsian	0	3
(France) J Benneteau	6	6
Q	(Monaco) J-R Lisnard	6	7
WC	(United States) D Young	4	5
(Argentina) J Mónaco	6	3	3
LL	(Czech Republic) I Minář	4	6	6

Second round
10	(Sweden) J Johansson	6^{3}	4
Q	(United States) J Morrison	7^{7}	6
(France) J Benneteau	5	0
23	(Czech Republic) R Štěpánek	7	6
28	(Argentina) J I Chela	1	6	6
Q	(Monaco) J-R Lisnard	6	2	2
LL	(Czech Republic) I Minář	3	5
6	(United Kingdom) T Henman	6	7

Third round
Q	(United States) J Morrison	3	0
23	(Czech Republic) R Štěpánek	6	6
26	(Argentina) J I Chela	3	1
6	(United Kingdom) T Henman	6	6

Fourth round
23	(Czech Republic) R Štěpánek	5	3
6	(United Kingdom) T Henman	7	6

==== Section 3 ====
First round
(Czech Republic) J Hernych	6^{6}	1
Q	(Italy) D Sanguinetti	7^{8}	6
(France) A Dupuis	4	1
(Romania) V Hănescu	6	6
Q	(Germany) L Burgsmüller	2	3
(Germany) F Mayer	6	6
Q	(Belgium) C Rochus	4	2
WC	(Australia) M Philippoussis	6	6

Second round
4	(Argentina) G Coria	6	6
Q	(Italy) D Sanguinetti	1	4
(Romania) V Hănescu	6	1	0^{r}
31	(United States) T Dent	2	6	4
22	(Germany) N Kiefer	4	2
(Germany) F Mayer	6	6
WC	(Australia) M Philippoussis
15	(Chile) F González	w/o

Third round
4	(Argentina) G Coria	3	4
31	(United States) T Dent	6	6
(Germany) F Mayer	7^{7}	2	6
15	(Chile) F González	6^{3}	6	3

Fourth round
31	(United States) T Dent	6	6
(Germany) F Mayer	3	4

==== Section 4 ====
First round
PR	(France) P-H Mathieu	4	7^{7}	6
(Czech Republic) M Tabara	6	6^{2}	4
Q	(France) A Clément	6	3
(Czech Republic) T Berdych	3	0^{r}
Q	(Ecuador) N Lapentti	6	7^{10}
(Slovakia) K Beck	1	6^{8}
Q	(Germany) B Phau	7^{9}	6
(Spain) Á Calatrava	6^{7}	0

Second round
9	(United States) A Agassi	7	6
PR	(France) P-H Mathieu	5	4
Q	(France) A Clément	6	7
19	(Spain) F López	1	5
27	(France) S Grosjean	6	6
Q	(Ecuador) N Lapentti	1	3
Q	(Germany) B Phau	2	2
7	(Argentina) G Gaudio	6	6

Third round
9	(United States) A Agassi	6	6
Q	(France) A Clément	2	4
27	(France) S Grosjean	2	3
7	(Argentina) G Gaudio	6	6

Fourth round
9	(United States) A Agassi	7^{9}	6
7	(Argentina) G Gaudio	6^{7}	2

=== Bottom half ===
==== Section 5 ====
First round
(Austria) J Melzer	4	3
(Argentina) J Acasuso	6	6
(Germany) P Kohlschreiber	2	6^{6}
(Spain) D Ferrer	6	7^{8}
(Russia) I Andreev	7^{7}	2	7^{14}
Q	(Spain) N Almagro	6^{4}	6	6^{12}
(Spain) J C Ferrero	6	6
WC	(United States) B Evans	2	4

Second round
8	(Argentina) D Nalbandian	6	6
(Argentina) J Acasuso	3	3
(Spain) D Ferrer	3	5
32	(Belgium) X Malisse	6	5^{d}
20	(Romania) A Pavel	2	1
(Russia) I Andreev	6	6
(Spain) J C Ferrero	6	2	6
11	(Argentina) G Cañas	4	6	4

Third round
8	(Argentina) D Nalbandian	6^{0}	1
(Spain) D Ferrer	7^{7}	6
(Russia) I Andreev	4	3
(Spain) J C Ferrero	6	6

Fourth round
(Spain) D Ferrer	6^{7}	6	7
(Spain) J C Ferrero	7^{9}	3	5

==== Section 6 ====
First round
(France) M Llodra	6	4	3
WC	(France) G Monfils	3	6	6
(Sweden) T Enqvist	6	4	3
(South Korea) H-T Lee	3	6	6
(France) C Saulnier	2	6^{4}
(Finland) J Nieminen	6	7^{7}
(Georgia (country)) I Labadze	6	1	6
PR	(Morocco) Y El Aynaoui	4	6	1

Second round
14	(Russia) N Davydenko	6	1	4
WC	(France) G Monfils	4	6	6
(South Korea) H-T Lee	6	6
17	(Russia) M Youzhny	1	4
26	(Slovakia) D Hrbatý	6	6
(Finland) J Nieminen	3	4
(Georgia (country)) I Labadze	4	6	6^{5}
3	(Russia) M Safin	6	2	7^{7}

Third round
WC	(France) G Monfils	7^{7}	3	7^{7}
(South Korea) H-T Lee	6^{5}	6	6^{1}
26	(Slovakia) D Hrbatý	7^{8}	6
3	(Russia) M Safin	6^{6}	1

Fourth round
WC	(France) G Monfils	3	3
26	(Slovakia) D Hrbatý	6	6

==== Section 7 ====
First round
WC	(United States) J Blake	6	6
Q	(Denmark) K Carlsen	3	2
Q	(Italy) A Seppi	6	4	4
(United Kingdom) G Rusedski	4	6	6
(United States) K Kim	6	4	7^{7}
(Peru) L Horna	4	6	6^{0}
(Sweden) J Björkman	2	6	6
(Belarus) M Mirnyi	6	4	1

Second round
5	(Spain) C Moyà	4	7	7^{8}
WC	(United States) J Blake	6	5	6^{6}
(United Kingdom) G Rusedski	3	4
25	(Sweden) T Johansson	6	6
24	(Czech Republic) J Novák	6	6
(United States) K Kim	1	2
(Sweden) J Björkman	4	0
12	(Spain) T Robredo	6	6

Third round
5	(Spain) C Moyà	6^{6}	6	2
25	(Sweden) T Johansson	7^{8}	3	6
24	(Czech Republic) J Novák	w/o
12	(Spain) T Robredo

Fourth round
25	(Sweden) T Johansson	7^{7}	6
24	(Czech Republic) J Novák	6^{2}	2

==== Section 8 ====
First round
(Spain) A Martín	3	6	7^{7}
(Argentina) A Calleri	6	3	6^{3}
(United States) R Ginepri	7^{7}	6
(Italy) F Volandri	6^{4}	1
(Italy) P Starace	6^{4}	7	6^{5}
(Germany) R Schüttler	7^{7}	5	7^{7}
(Netherlands) P Wessels	4	5
(Spain) F Verdasco	6	7

Second round
13	(Croatia) I Ljubičić	6	6
(Spain) A Martín	3	3
(United States) R Ginepri	3	4
21	(United States) V Spadea	6	6
29	(Spain) R Nadal	6	7^{7}
(Germany) R Schüttler	4	6^{5}
(Spain) F Verdasco	7^{11}	4
2	(United States) A Roddick	6^{9}	3^{r}

Third round
13	(Croatia) I Ljubičić	6	4	7^{7}
21	(United States) V Spadea	3	6	6^{3}
29	(Spain) R Nadal	6	6
(Spain) F Verdasco	2	2

Fourth round
13	(Croatia) I Ljubičić	4	7^{7}	3
29	(Spain) R Nadal	6	6^{5}	6

== Qualifying ==
=== Qualifying seeds ===
1. (Denmark) Kenneth Carlsen (qualified)
2. (Belgium) Christophe Rochus (qualified)
3. (Spain) ~~Álex Calatrava~~ (moved to main draw)
4. (Czech Republic) Tomáš Zíb (qualified)
5. (Spain) Nicolás Almagro (qualified)
6. (Germany) Lars Burgsmüller (qualified)
7. (Italy) Davide Sanguinetti (qualified)
8. (Argentina) Edgardo Massa (first round)
9. (France) Jean-René Lisnard (qualified)
10. (Czech Republic) Bohdan Ulihrach (first round)
11. (Germany) Björn Phau (qualified)
12. (United States) Jeff Morrison (qualified)
13. (Czechoslovakia) Ivo Minář (qualifying competition, lucky loser)
14. (Australia) Peter Luczak (qualifying competition)
15. (Chile) Adrián García (qualifying competition)
16. (Ecuador) Giovanni Lapentti (first round, retired due to a shoulder injury)
17. (South Africa) Wesley Moodie (qualifying competition)
18. (France) Thierry Ascione (first round)
19. (United States) Jan-Michael Gambill (first round)
20. (Switzerland) Ivo Heuberger (qualifying competition)
21. (France) Gilles Simon (qualifying competition)
22. (Brazil) Flávio Saretta (first round)
23. (France) Grégory Carraz (first round, retired due to an illness)
24. (France) Arnaud Clément (qualified)

=== Qualifiers ===
1. (Denmark) Kenneth Carlsen
2. (Belgium) Christophe Rochus
3. (Ecuador) Nicolás Lapentti
4. (Czech Republic) Tomáš Zíb
5. (Spain) Nicolás Almagro
6. (Germany) Lars Burgsmüller
7. (Italy) Davide Sanguinetti
8. (Italy) Andreas Seppi
9. (France) Jean-René Lisnard
10. (France) Arnaud Clément
11. (Germany) Björn Phau
12. (United States) Jeff Morrison

=== Lucky loser ===
1. (Czech Republic) Ivo Minář

=== Qualifying draw ===
==== First qualifier ====
First round
1	(Denmark) Kenneth Carlsen	7	6
(Russia) Igor Kunitsyn	5	2
(United States) Hugo Armando	4	4
13	(Czech Republic) Ivo Minář	6	6

Qualifying competition
1	(Denmark) Kenneth Carlsen	7	6
13	(Czech Republic) Ivo Minář	5	3

==== Second qualifier ====
First round
2	(Belgium) Christophe Rochus	6	6^{4}	7^{7}
(Sweden) Michael Ryderstedt	3	7^{7}	6^{4}
(United States) Jeff Salzenstein	6	6
19	(United States) Jan-Michael Gambill	3	3

Qualifying competition
2	(Belgium) Christophe Rochus	6	6
(United States) Jeff Salzenstein	4	1

==== Third qualifier ====
First round
Alt	(United States) Amer Delić	7^{7}	5	5
(Ecuador) Nicolás Lapentti	6^{4}	7	7
WC	(United States) Troy Hahn	3	1
21	(France) Gilles Simon	6	6

Qualifying competition
(Ecuador) Nicolás Lapentti	6	6
21	(France) Gilles Simon	4	3

==== Fourth qualifier ====
First round
4	(Czech Republic) Tomáš Zíb	6	6
(Israel) Noam Okun	4	4
(United States) Justin Gimelstob	7	1	1
14	(Australia) Peter Luczak	5	6	6

Qualifying competition
4	(Czech Republic) Tomáš Zíb	6	7^{7}
14	(Australia) Peter Luczak	3	6^{4}

==== Fifth qualifier ====
First round
5	(Spain) Nicolás Almagro	6	6
WC	(United States) Alex Kuznetsov	4	4
(Japan) Takao Suzuki	4	6	7^{8}
22	(Brazil) Flávio Saretta	6	2	6^{6}

Qualifying competition
5	(Spain) Nicolás Almagro	6	6
(Japan) Takao Suzuki	1	4

==== Sixth qualifier ====
First round
6	(Germany) Lars Burgsmüller	6	6
WC	(Australia) Todd Reid	2	3
(Italy) Daniele Bracciali	7^{7}	3
16	(Ecuador) Giovanni Lapentti	6^{4}	0^{r}

Qualifying competition
6	(Germany) Lars Burgsmüller	7^{11}	3	6
(Italy) Daniele Bracciali	6^{9}	6	3

==== Seventh qualifier ====
First round
7	(Italy) Davide Sanguinetti	1	6	7^{7}
(Canada) Frank Dancevic	6	4	6^{2}
WC	(Romania) Horia Tecău	4	2
20	(Switzerland) Ivo Heuberger	6	6

Qualifying competition
7	(Italy) Davide Sanguinetti	6	3	7^{8}
20	(Switzerland) Ivo Heuberger	4	6	6^{6}

==== Eighth qualifier ====
First round
8	(Argentina) Edgardo Massa	6	6^{5}	2
(Italy) Andreas Seppi	1	7^{7}	6
(France) Jo-Wilfried Tsonga	6	6^{4}	6^{4}
15	(Chile) Adrián García	2	7^{7}	7^{7}

Qualifying competition
(Italy) Andreas Seppi	7	6
15	(Chile) Adrián García	5	3

==== Ninth qualifier ====
First round
9	(France) Jean-René Lisnard	4	6	6
(United States) Paul Goldstein	6	1	3
(United States) Alex Bogomolov Jr.	6	2
23	(France) Grégory Carraz	3	0^{r}

Qualifying competition
9	(France) Jean-René Lisnard	6	6
(United States) Alex Bogomolov Jr.	2	4

==== Tenth qualifier ====
First round
10	(Czech Republic) Bohdan Ulihrach	5	5
(Croatia) Roko Karanušić	7	7
(Austria) Alexander Peya	4	2
24	(France) Arnaud Clément	6	6

Qualifying competition
(Croatia) Roko Karanušić	6^{3}	4
24	(France) Arnaud Clément	7^{7}	6

==== Eleventh qualifier ====
First round
11	(Germany) Björn Phau	6	6
WC	(United States) Timothy Neilly	2	0
(Germany) Tobias Summerer	7	6
18	(France) Thierry Ascione	5	2

Qualifying competition
11	(Germany) Björn Phau	7	2
(Germany) Tobias Summerer	5	0^{r}

==== Twelfth qualifier ====
First round
12	(United States) Jeff Morrison	7^{7}	7
(United States) Glenn Weiner	6^{4}	5
(Romania) Răzvan Sabău	0	2
17	(South Africa) Wesley Moodie	6	6

Qualifying competition
12	(United States) Jeff Morrison	7^{10}	6
17	(South Africa) Wesley Moodie	6^{8}	2
