= 2005 NASDAQ-100 Open – Women's doubles =

Women's doubles
- 2005 NASDAQ-100 Open

Final
- Champions: (Russia) Svetlana Kuznetsova (Australia) Alicia Molik
- Runners-up: (United States) Lisa Raymond (Australia) Rennae Stubbs
- Score: 7–5, 6–7^{(5–7)}, 6–2

Details
- Draw: 32 (3WC/1Q/1LL)
- Seeds: 8

Events
Singles	men	women
Doubles	men	women
← 2004 ·	Miami Open	· 2006 →

Nadia Petrova and Meghann Shaughnessy were the defending champions, but lost in quarterfinals to Lisa Raymond and Rennae Stubbs.

Svetlana Kuznetsova and Alicia Molik won the title, defeating Raymond and Stubbs 7–5, 6–7^{(5–7)}, 6–2 in the final. It was the 12th doubles title for Kuznetsova and the 6th doubles title for Molik in their respective careers.

== Seeds ==
1. (Spain) Virginia Ruano Pascual / (Argentina) Paola Suárez (semifinals)
2. (Russia) Nadia Petrova / (United States) Meghann Shaughnessy (quarterfinals)
3. (Russia) Svetlana Kuznetsova / (Australia) Alicia Molik (champions)
4. (Russia) Elena Likhovtseva / (Japan) Ai Sugiyama (first round)
5. (United States) Lisa Raymond / (Australia) Rennae Stubbs (final)
6. (Russia) Anastasia Myskina / (Russia) Vera Zvonareva (quarterfinals)
7. (United States) Martina Navratilova / (Italy) Francesca Schiavone (first round)
8. (France) Marion Bartoli / (Germany) Anna-Lena Grönefeld (first round, retired)

== Draw ==
=== Key ===
- Q = Qualifier
- WC = Wild card
- LL = Lucky loser
- Alt = Alternate
- SE = Special exempt
- PR = Protected ranking
- ITF = ITF entry
- JE = Junior exempt
- w/o = Walkover
- r = Retired
- d = Defaulted
- SR = Special ranking

=== Finals ===
Semifinals
1	(Spain) Virginia Ruano Pascual (Argentina) Paola Suárez	4	3
3	(Russia) Svetlana Kuznetsova (Australia) Alicia Molik	6	6
(South Africa) Liezel Huber (Bulgaria) Magdalena Maleeva	4	6	2
5	(United States) Lisa Raymond (Australia) Rennae Stubbs	6	4	6

Final
3	(Russia) Svetlana Kuznetsova (Australia) Alicia Molik	7	6^{5}	6
5	(United States) Lisa Raymond (Australia) Rennae Stubbs	5	7^{7}	2

=== Top half ===
First round
1	(Spain) V Ruano Pascual (Argentina) P Suárez	6	2	7^{9}
(Czech Republic) I Benešová (Czech Republic) K Peschke	1	6	6^{7}
(Slovakia) D Hantuchová (Switzerland) P Schnyder	4	6	6^{2}
(France) É Loit (Thailand) T Tanasugarn	6	4	7^{7}
(Italy) T Garbin (Slovenia) T Križan	3	6^{2}
WC	(Serbia and Montenegro) A Ivanovic (Czech Republic) N Vaidišová	6	7^{7}
WC	(Russia) M Kirilenko (Argentina) ME Salerni	2
8	(France) M Bartoli (Germany) AL Grönefeld	3^{r}
3	(Russia) S Kuznetsova (Australia) A Molik	6	6^{8}	7^{7}
(Greece) E Daniilidou (Australia) N Pratt	1	7^{10}	6^{3}
(United States) J Craybas (United States) L Granville	3	0
(Argentina) G Dulko (Venezuela) M Vento-Kabchi	6	6
(Switzerland) E Gagliardi (Spain) M Serna	3	5
(Chinese Taipei) J Lee (Croatia) S Talaja	6	7
(United States) J Russell (Italy) M Santangelo	5	6^{2}
6	(Russia) A Myskina (Russia) V Zvonareva	7	7^{7}

Second round
1	(Spain) V Ruano Pascual (Argentina) P Suárez	6	6
(France) É Loit (Thailand) T Tanasugarn	2	2
WC	(Serbia and Montenegro) A Ivanovic (Czech Republic) N Vaidišová	4	4
WC	(Russia) M Kirilenko (Argentina) ME Salerni	6	6
3	(Russia) S Kuznetsova (Australia) A Molik	6	6
(Argentina) G Dulko (Venezuela) M Vento-Kabchi	3	2
(Chinese Taipei) J Lee (Croatia) S Talaja	3	4
6	(Russia) A Myskina (Russia) V Zvonareva	6	6

Quarterfinals
1	(Spain) V Ruano Pascual (Argentina) P Suárez	6	4	6
WC	(Russia) M Kirilenko (Argentina) ME Salerni	3	6	2
3	(Russia) S Kuznetsova (Australia) A Molik	4	6	7
6	(Russia) A Myskina (Russia) V Zvonareva	6	3	5

Semifinals
1	(Spain) V Ruano Pascual (Argentina) P Suárez	4	3
3	(Russia) S Kuznetsova (Australia) A Molik	6	6

=== Bottom half ===
First round
7	(United States) M Navratilova (Italy) F Schiavone	4	6	2
(Spain) A Medina Garrigues (Russia) D Safina	6	3	6
(Russia) E Bovina (Russia) E Dementieva	6	6
(Czech Republic) G Navratilova (Czech Republic) M Paštiková	1	2
(Australia) B Stewart (Australia) S Stosur	7^{7}	7^{7}
WC	(United States) J Jackson (United States) J Kirkland	6^{5}	6^{1}
(South Africa) L Huber (Bulgaria) M Maleeva	7	6
4	(Russia) E Likhovtseva (Japan) A Sugiyama	5	4
5	(United States) L Raymond (Australia) R Stubbs	6	6
LL	(Russia) A Jidkova (Ukraine) T Perebiynis	4	1
(Venezuela) M Sequera (United States) M Tu	7	6^{2}	4
Q	(France) S Cohen-Aloro (Tunisia) S Sfar	5	7^{7}	6
(Japan) S Asagoe (Slovenia) K Srebotnik	6	6
(Czech Republic) E Birnerová (Australia) L McShea	1	3
(United States) J Hopkins (United States) M Washington	4	2
2	(Russia) N Petrova (United States) M Shaughnessy	6	6

Second round
(Spain) A Medina Garrigues (Russia) D Safina	3	3
(Russia) E Bovina (Russia) E Dementieva	6	6
(Australia) B Stewart (Australia) S Stosur	7^{7}	6^{8}	1
(South Africa) L Huber (Bulgaria) M Maleeva	6^{4}	7^{10}	6
5	(United States) L Raymond (Australia) R Stubbs	6	6
Q	(France) S Cohen-Aloro (Tunisia) S Sfar	3	2
(Japan) S Asagoe (Slovenia) K Srebotnik	2	1
2	(Russia) N Petrova (United States) M Shaughnessy	6	6

Quarterfinals
(Russia) E Bovina (Russia) E Dementieva	6	5	4
(South Africa) L Huber (Bulgaria) M Maleeva	1	7	6
5	(United States) L Raymond (Australia) R Stubbs	6	6
2	(Russia) N Petrova (United States) M Shaughnessy	4	3

Semifinals
(South Africa) L Huber (Bulgaria) M Maleeva	4	6	2
5	(United States) L Raymond (Australia) R Stubbs	6	4	6

== Qualifying ==
=== Qualifying seeds ===
1. (Russia) Alina Jidkova / (Ukraine) Tatiana Perebiynis (qualifying competition, Lucky losers)
2. (France) Stéphanie Cohen-Aloro / (Tunisia) Selima Sfar (qualified)

=== Qualifiers ===
1. (France) Stéphanie Cohen-Aloro / (Tunisia) Selima Sfar

=== Lucky losers ===
1. (Russia) Alina Jidkova / (Ukraine) Tatiana Perebiynis

=== Qualifying draw ===
First round
1	(Russia) A Jidkova (Ukraine) T Perebiynis	8
(Italy) Ad Serra Zanetti (Italy) An Serra Zanetti	4
(Czech Republic) D Chládková (Slovakia) Ľ Kurhajcová	3
(Luxembourg) C Schaul (United States) A Spears	8
(Romania) R Dragomir Ilie (Romania) A Vanc	8
WC	(United States) A Haynes (United States) A Rolle	5
(France) C Dhenin (Spain) M Marrero	3
2	(France) S Cohen-Aloro (Tunisia) S Sfar	8

Second round
1	(Russia) A Jidkova (Ukraine) T Perebiynis	8
(Luxembourg) C Schaul (United States) A Spears	4
(Romania) R Dragomir Ilie (Romania) A Vanc	3
2	(France) S Cohen-Aloro (Tunisia) S Sfar	8

Qualifying competition
1	(Russia) A Jidkova (Ukraine) T Perebiynis	7	4	5
2	(France) S Cohen-Aloro (Tunisia) S Sfar	5	6	7
