= Jeff Morrison =

American tennis player

- Full name: Jeffrey Alan Morrison
- Country (sports): United States
- Residence: Lexington, Kentucky, United States
- Born: February 4, 1979 (age 46); Huntington, West Virginia, USA
- Height: 6 ft 1 in (1.85 m)
- Turned pro: 2000
- Retired: 2006
- Plays: Right-handed (two-handed backhand)
- College: University of Florida
- Prize money: US$ 770,476

Singles
- Career record: 32–58 (at ATP Tour-level, Grand Slam-level, and in Davis Cup)
- Career titles: 0
- Highest ranking: No. 85 (8 July 2002)

Grand Slam singles results
- Australian Open: 2R (2004)
- French Open: 1R (2005)
- Wimbledon: 3R (2002)
- US Open: 1R (1999, 2002, 2003, 2004, 2006)

Doubles
- Career record: 23–35 (at ATP Tour-level, Grand Slam-level, and in Davis Cup)
- Career titles: 0
- Highest ranking: No. 81 (10 June 2002)

Grand Slam doubles results
- Australian Open: 1R (2002)
- French Open: 2R (2002)
- Wimbledon: 1R (2002)
- US Open: 3R (2001, 2005)

Grand Slam mixed doubles results
- US Open: 1R (2002, 2005)
- Last updated on: 10 November 2021.

Jeffrey Alan Morrison (born February 4, 1979) is a retired American professional tennis player.

Morrison was the last American male left in the singles draw at Wimbledon in 2002, going on to defeat future World No. 1 Juan Carlos Ferrero en route to the third round.

Morrison attended the University of Florida in Gainesville, Florida, where he played for the Florida Gators men's tennis team in National Collegiate Athletic Association (NCAA) competition. He defeated James Blake of Harvard University in the NCAA Singles National Championship final in 1999. Morrison was a two-time All-American during his sophomore and junior seasons, and was inducted into the University of Florida Athletic Hall of Fame as a "Gator Great" in 2012.

During his career, Morrison won three Challenger events and reached as high as World No. 85 in singles and World No. 81 in doubles (both in the summer of 2002).

== Performance timelines ==
Key
W	F	SF	QF	#R	RR	Q#	DNQ	A	NH

(W) winner; (F) finalist; (SF) semifinalist; (QF) quarterfinalist; (#R) rounds 4, 3, 2, 1; (RR) round-robin stage; (Q#) qualification round; (DNQ) did not qualify; (A) absent; (NH) not held; (SR) strike rate (events won / competed); (W–L) win–loss record.

=== Singles ===
Tournament	1999	2000	2001	2002	2003	2004	2005	2006	SR	W–L	Win%
Grand Slam tournaments
Australian Open	A	A	A	Q1	1R	2R	A	A	0 / 2	1–2	33%
French Open	A	A	A	Q2	A	Q1	1R	A	0 / 1	0–1	0%
Wimbledon	A	A	A	3R	A	Q1	1R	Q2	0 / 2	2–2	50%
US Open	1R	Q1	Q3	1R	1R	1R	Q1	1R	0 / 5	0–5	0%
Win–loss	0–1	0–0	0–0	2–2	0–2	1–2	0–2	0–1	0 / 10	3–10	23%
ATP Tour Masters 1000
Indian Wells	A	A	A	A	A	A	1R	2R	0 / 2	1–2	33%
Miami	A	A	A	2R	Q2	1R	3R	Q1	0 / 3	3–3	50%
Cincinnati	Q1	A	1R	1R	A	2R	Q1	A	0 / 3	1–3	25%
Win–loss	0–0	0–0	0–1	1–2	0–0	1–2	2–2	1–1	0 / 8	5–8	38%

=== Doubles ===
Tournament	2001	2002	2003	2004	2005	2006	SR	W–L	Win%
Grand Slam tournaments
Australian Open	A	1R	A	A	A	A	0 / 1	0–1	0%
French Open	A	2R	A	A	A	A	0 / 1	1–1	50%
Wimbledon	A	1R	A	A	A	Q1	0 / 1	0–1	0%
US Open	3R	2R	1R	1R	3R	2R	0 / 6	6–6	50%
Win–loss	2–1	2–4	0–1	0–1	2–1	1–1	0 / 9	7–9	44%
ATP Tour Masters 1000
Miami	A	2R	1R	A	1R	A	0 / 3	1–3	25%
Cincinnati	1R	A	A	1R	2R	A	0 / 3	1–3	25%
Win–loss	0–1	1–1	0–1	0–1	1–2	0–0	0 / 6	2–6	25%

== ATP career finals ==
=== Doubles: 1 (1 runner-up) ===
Legend Grand Slam tournaments (0–0) ATP World Tour Finals (0–0) ATP Masters Series (0–0) ATP Championship Series (0–0) ATP World Series (0–1)	Titles by surface Hard (0–1) Clay (0–0) Grass (0–0) Carpet (0–0)	Titles by setting Outdoor (0–1) Indoor (0–0)

Result	W–L	Date	Tournament	Tier	Surface	Partner	Opponents	Score
Loss	0–1	Jan 2003	Adelaide, Australia	International Series	Hard	(Belarus) Max Mirnyi	(South Africa) Jeff Coetzee (South Africa) Chris Haggard	6–2, 4–6, 6–7^{(7–9)}

== ATP Challenger and ITF Futures finals ==
=== Singles: 11 (4–7) ===
Legend ATP Challenger (3–5) ITF Futures (1–2)	Finals by surface Hard (3–7) Clay (0–0) Grass (1–0) Carpet (0–0)

Result	W–L	Date	Tournament	Tier	Surface	Opponent	Score
Loss	0–1	Nov 2000	USA F26, Lafayette	Futures	Hard	(South Africa) Justin Bower	7–6^{(7–4)}, 3–6, 0–6
Loss	0–2	Jan 2001	USA F3, Hallandale Beach	Futures	Hard	(Russia) Dmitry Tursunov	6–7^{(0–7)}, 3–6
Win	1–2	Mar 2001	USA F6, Tyler	Futures	Hard	(United States) Levar Harper-Griffith	6–3, 6–4
Loss	1–3	Jul 2001	Granby, Canada	Challenger	Hard	(Germany) Axel Pretzsch	7–6^{(7–5)}, 3–6, 4–6
Loss	1–4	Jul 2001	Aptos, United States	Challenger	Hard	(United States) Jeff Salzenstein	6–7^{(3–7)}, 4–6
Win	2–4	Feb 2002	Dallas, United States	Challenger	Hard	(Netherlands) Martin Verkerk	6–4, 6–4
Win	3–4	Jun 2002	Surbiton, United Kingdom	Challenger	Grass	(South Africa) Wesley Moodie	7–6^{(7–4)}, 5–7, 7–6^{(7–4)}
Loss	3–5	Oct 2003	Fresno, United States	Challenger	Hard	(United States) Alex Kim	5–7, 6–7^{(6–8)}
Loss	3–6	Oct 2003	Tiburon, United States	Challenger	Hard	(United States) Alex Bogomolov Jr.	6–7^{(4–7)}, 3–6
Win	4–6	Apr 2004	Mexico City, Mexico	Challenger	Hard	(Chinese Taipei) Lu Yen-hsun	4–6, 7–6^{(7–3)}, 6–2
Loss	4–7	Apr 2005	Mexico City, Mexico	Challenger	Hard	(United States) Amer Delić	4–6, 6–3, 3–6

=== Doubles: 16 (11–5) ===
Legend ATP Challenger (8–4) ITF Futures (3–1)	Finals by surface Hard (9–4) Clay (2–1) Grass (0–0) Carpet (0–0)

Result	W–L	Date	Tournament	Tier	Surface	Partner	Opponents	Score
Win	1–0	Jul 1999	USA F10, Chico	Futures	Hard	(United States) Jason Cook	(United States) Brandon Hawk (United States) Doug Root	7–5, 3–6, 6–1
Win	2–0	Jul 2000	USA F19, Kansas City	Futures	Hard	(United States) Jeff Laski	(United States) Trace Fielding (United States) Jimmy Haney	7–5, 6–3
Loss	2–1	Nov 2000	USA F26, Lafayette	Futures	Hard	(United States) Thomas Blake	(United States) Jack Brasington (United States) Doug Root	walkover
Win	3–1	Jan 2001	USA F1, Aventura	Futures	Hard	(United States) Mardy Fish	(United States) Eric Drew (United States) Thomas Blake	walkover
Win	4–1	Jul 2001	Granby, Canada	Challenger	Hard	(Canada) Bobby Kokavec	(United States) Brandon Hawk (United States) Robert Kendrick	6–4, 6–4
Win	5–1	Oct 2001	Tulsa, United States	Challenger	Hard	(United States) Mardy Fish	(South Africa) Jeff Coetzee (South Africa) Shaun Rudman	6–2, 6–3
Loss	5–2	Oct 2001	Kerrville, United States	Challenger	Hard	(United States) Mardy Fish	(United States) Brandon Hawk (United States) Robert Kendrick	3–6, 7–6^{(9–7)}, 3–6
Loss	5–3	Nov 2001	Tyler, United States	Challenger	Hard	(United States) Mardy Fish	(Australia) Stephen Huss (South Africa) Paul Rosner	4–6, 2–6
Win	6–3	Nov 2001	Knoxville, United States	Challenger	Hard	(United States) Mardy Fish	(United States) Brandon Coupe (United States) Kelly Gullett	6–3, 6–0
Win	7–3	Dec 2001	Urbana, United States	Challenger	Hard	(United States) Mardy Fish	(Romania) Gabriel Trifu (South Africa) Paul Rosner	6–3, 5–7, 6–4
Win	8–3	May 2002	Birmingham, United States	Challenger	Clay	(United States) Mardy Fish	(United States) Glenn Weiner (South Africa) Paul Rosner	6–4, 7–6^{(7–4)}
Win	9–3	Sep 2003	San Antonio, United States	Challenger	Hard	(United States) Paul Goldstein	(Czech Republic) Tomáš Cakl (South Africa) Louis Vosloo	6–3, 6–2
Loss	9–4	Oct 2003	Fresno, United States	Challenger	Hard	(United States) Paul Goldstein	(United States) Diego Ayala (United States) Travis Parrott	5–7, 6–4, 3–6
Loss	9–5	Apr 2006	Paget, Bermuda	Challenger	Clay	(United States) Alex Kuznetsov	(Czech Republic) Tomáš Cibulec (Sweden) Robert Lindstedt	7–6^{(7–1)}, 3–6, [4–10]
Win	10–5	May 2006	Tunica Resorts, United States	Challenger	Clay	(United States) Bobby Reynolds	(United States) Hugo Armando (Brazil) Ricardo Mello	3–6, 7–6^{(7–5)}, [11–9]
Win	11–5	Oct 2006	Sacramento, United States	Challenger	Hard	(United States) Paul Goldstein	(United States) Amer Delić (United States) Brian Wilson	6–1, 6–3

== See also ==
- Florida Gators
- List of Florida Gators tennis players
- List of University of Florida Athletic Hall of Fame members
