= 2005 NASDAQ-100 Open – Men's doubles =

Men's doubles
- 2005 NASDAQ-100 Open

Final
- Champions: (Sweden) Jonas Björkman (Belarus) Max Mirnyi
- Runners-up: (Zimbabwe) Wayne Black (Zimbabwe) Kevin Ullyett
- Score: 6–1, 6–2

Events
Singles	men	women
Doubles	men	women
← 2004 ·	NASDAQ-100 Open	· 2006 →

Wayne Black and Kevin Ullyett were the defending champions, but lost in the final this year..

Jonas Björkman and Max Mirnyi won the title, defeating Black and Ullyett 6–1, 6–2 in the final.

== Seeds ==
1. (The Bahamas) Mark Knowles / (Canada) Daniel Nestor (semifinals)
2. (Zimbabwe) Wayne Black / (Zimbabwe) Kevin Ullyett (final)
3. (Sweden) Jonas Björkman / (Belarus) Max Mirnyi (champions)
4. (United States) Bob Bryan / (United States) Mike Bryan (first round)
5. (India) Mahesh Bhupathi / (Australia) Todd Woodbridge (quarterfinals)
6. (Australia) Wayne Arthurs / (Australia) Paul Hanley (first round)
7. (India) Leander Paes / (Serbia and Montenegro) Nenad Zimonjić (first round)
8. (Czech Republic) Martin Damm / (United States) Jared Palmer (first round)

== Draw ==
=== Key ===
- Q = Qualifier
- WC = Wild card
- LL = Lucky loser
- Alt = Alternate
- SE = Special exempt
- PR = Protected ranking
- ITF = ITF entry
- JE = Junior exempt
- w/o = Walkover
- r = Retired
- d = Defaulted
- SR = Special ranking

=== Finals ===
Semifinals
1	(The Bahamas) Mark Knowles (Canada) Daniel Nestor	7^{7}	6^{3}	5
3	(Sweden) Jonas Björkman (Belarus) Max Mirnyi	6^{3}	7^{7}	7
(Russia) Nikolay Davydenko (Slovakia) Dominik Hrbatý	3	4
2	(Zimbabwe) Wayne Black (Zimbabwe) Kevin Ullyett	6	6

Final
3	(Sweden) Jonas Björkman (Belarus) Max Mirnyi	6	6
2	(Zimbabwe) Wayne Black (Zimbabwe) Kevin Ullyett	1	2

=== Top half ===
First round
1	(The Bahamas) M Knowles (Canada) D Nestor	6	6
(France) J Benneteau (Chile) F González	3	4
(Argentina) L Arnold (Argentina) M Hood	4	6	6
(Czech Republic) C Suk (Czech Republic) P Vízner	6	1	4
(Spain) F López (Spain) R Nadal	6	6
(Czech Republic) F Čermák (Czech Republic) L Friedl	1	4
(United States) J Gimelstob (United Kingdom) G Rusedski	6	2	7^{11}
6	(Australia) W Arthurs (Australia) P Hanley	4	6	6^{9}
3	(Sweden) J Björkman (Belarus) M Mirnyi	6	6
(Argentina) M García (Argentina) S Prieto	3	4
Alt	(United States) B Coupe (United States) J Morrison	0	3
(Australia) A Fisher (Spain) F Verdasco	6	6
(United States) G Oliver (United States) T Parrott	6	4	7^{7}
WC	(United States) J Blake (United States) M Fish	2	6	6^{4}
(Czech Republic) J Novák (Czech Republic) D Rikl	6^{3}	2
5	(India) M Bhupathi (Australia) T Woodbridge	6	7^{7}

Second round
1	(The Bahamas) M Knowles (Canada) D Nestor	4	6	6
(Argentina) L Arnold (Argentina) M Hood	6	3	3
(Spain) F López (Spain) R Nadal	3	6	6
(United States) J Gimelstob (United Kingdom) G Rusedski	6	2	4
3	(Sweden) J Björkman (Belarus) M Mirnyi	6	6
(Australia) A Fisher (Spain) F Verdasco	3	4
(United States) G Oliver (United States) T Parrott	3	4
5	(India) M Bhupathi (Australia) T Woodbridge	6	6

Quarterfinals
1	(The Bahamas) M Knowles (Canada) D Nestor	7^{7}	7^{8}
(Spain) F López (Spain) R Nadal	6^{3}	6^{6}
3	(Sweden) J Björkman (Belarus) M Mirnyi	6	7^{10}
5	(India) M Bhupathi (Australia) T Woodbridge	4	6^{8}

Semifinals
1	(The Bahamas) M Knowles (Canada) D Nestor	7^{7}	6^{3}	5
3	(Sweden) J Björkman (Belarus) M Mirnyi	6^{3}	7^{7}	7

=== Bottom half ===
First round
8	(Czech Republic) M Damm (United States) J Palmer	4	2
(Argentina) G Cañas (Argentina) G Etlis	6	6
(Sweden) S Aspelin (Australia) T Perry	5	6	3
(Russia) N Davydenko (Slovakia) D Hrbatý	7	1	6
(Switzerland) Y Allegro (Germany) M Kohlmann	3	3
(Australia) J Kerr (United States) J Thomas	6	6
(France) A Clément (France) M Llodra	7^{7}	6
4	(United States) B Bryan (United States) M Bryan	6^{4}	3
7	(India) L Paes (Serbia and Montenegro) N Zimonjić	6^{7}	7^{10}	3
WC	(Argentina) J Acasuso (Ecuador) N Lapentti	7^{9}	6^{8}	6
(Israel) J Erlich (Israel) A Ram	6^{5}	6	6
Alt	(Croatia) I Karlović (Germany) F Mayer	7^{7}	3	4
(Sweden) T Johansson (Russia) M Safin	3	3
(United States) T Dent (United States) R Ginepri	6	6
(Austria) J Knowle (Czech Republic) P Pála	3	1
2	(Zimbabwe) W Black (Zimbabwe) K Ullyett	6	6

Second round
(Argentina) G Cañas (Argentina) G Etlis	6	3	4
(Russia) N Davydenko (Slovakia) D Hrbatý	1	6	6
(Australia) J Kerr (United States) J Thomas	4	1
(France) A Clément (France) M Llodra	6	6
WC	(Argentina) J Acasuso (Ecuador) N Lapentti	6^{1}	2
(Israel) J Erlich (Israel) A Ram	7^{7}	6
(United States) T Dent (United States) R Ginepri	3	7^{9}	5
2	(Zimbabwe) W Black (Zimbabwe) K Ullyett	6	6^{7}	7

Quarterfinals
(Russia) N Davydenko (Slovakia) D Hrbatý	3	7	6
(France) A Clément (France) M Llodra	6	5	3
(Israel) J Erlich (Israel) A Ram	3	6	6^{2}
2	(Zimbabwe) W Black (Zimbabwe) K Ullyett	6	3	7^{7}

Semifinals
(Russia) N Davydenko (Slovakia) D Hrbatý	3	4
2	(Zimbabwe) W Black (Zimbabwe) K Ullyett	6	6
