= 2004 NASDAQ-100 Open – Men's singles =

Men's singles
- 2004 NASDAQ-100 Open

Final
- Champion: (United States) Andy Roddick
- Runner-up: (Argentina) Guillermo Coria
- Score: 6–7^{(2–7)}, 6–3, 6–1 (Coria retired)

Details
- Draw: 96 (12Q / 5WC / 1LL)
- Seeds: 32

Events
Singles	men	women
Doubles	men	women
- NASDAQ-100 Open

Andy Roddick won the men's singles tennis title at the 2004 Miami Open after Guillermo Coria retired in the final, with the scoreline at 6–7^{(2–7)}, 6–3, 6–1.

Andre Agassi was the three-time defending champion, but lost in the fourth round to Agustín Calleri. Agassi's win over Max Mirnyi in the third round was his record 20th consecutive win at the Miami Open.

The third round match between 17-year old, world No. 34-ranked Rafael Nadal and 22-year old, world No. 1-ranked Roger Federer marked the first time they faced each other, eventually meeting on 40 occasions. This was one of only two times the pair would meet before the quarterfinals, and this was the earliest round they meet throughout their rivalry.

== Seeds ==
All thirty-two seeds received a bye to the second round.

1. (Switzerland) Roger Federer (third round)
2. (United States) Andy Roddick (champion)
3. (Argentina) Guillermo Coria (final, retired because of a back injury)
4. (United States) Andre Agassi (fourth round)
5. (Spain) Carlos Moyá (quarterfinals)
6. (Germany) Rainer Schüttler (second round)
7. (United Kingdom) Tim Henman (second round)
8. (Argentina) ~~David Nalbandian~~ (withdrew)
9. (Thailand) Paradorn Srichaphan (fourth round)
10. (Chile) Nicolás Massú (second round)
11. (Australia) Mark Philippoussis (second round)
12. (France) Sébastien Grosjean (fourth round)
13. (Netherlands) Sjeng Schalken (second round, defaulted for verbal abuse)
14. (Czech Republic) Jiří Novák (third round)
15. (Netherlands) Martin Verkerk (second round)
16. (United States) Mardy Fish (second round)
17. (Australia) Lleyton Hewitt (third round)
18. (Brazil) Gustavo Kuerten (second round)
19. (Spain) Tommy Robredo (fourth round)
20. (Argentina) Agustín Calleri (quarterfinals)
21. (Chile) Fernando González (semifinals)
22. (Spain) Albert Costa (second round)
23. (Spain) Feliciano López (second round)
24. (France) Arnaud Clément (second round)
25. (Argentina) Juan Ignacio Chela (third round)
26. (Sweden) Jonas Björkman (third round)
27. (Slovakia) Dominik Hrbatý (third round)
28. (Belarus) Max Mirnyi (third round)
29. (Finland) Jarkko Nieminen (second round)
30. (Argentina) Gastón Gaudio (second round)
31. (Russia) Marat Safin (second round)
32. (Spain) Rafael Nadal (fourth round)

== Draw ==
Key

- Q = Qualifier
- WC = Wild card
- LL = Lucky loser
- Alt = Alternate
- ITF = ITF entry
- PR = Protected ranking
- SR = Special ranking
- SE = Special exempt
- JE = Junior exempt
- JR = Junior Accelerator Programme entrant
- CO = College Accelerator Programme entrant
- NG = Next Gen Accelerator Program entrant
- w/o = Walkover
- r = Retired
- d = Defaulted

=== Finals ===
Quarterfinals
21	(Chile) Fernando González	6^{5}	6	6
(Romania) Andrei Pavel	7^{7}	3	4
3	(Argentina) Guillermo Coria	6	6
(Germany) Nicolas Kiefer	3	3
(United States) Vince Spadea	7	6
20	(Argentina) Agustín Calleri	5	1
5	(Spain) Carlos Moyá	7	2	5
2	(United States) Andy Roddick	5	6	7

Semifinals
21	(Chile) Fernando González	6	6^{6}	1
3	(Argentina) Guillermo Coria	4	7^{8}	6
(United States) Vince Spadea	1	3
2	(United States) Andy Roddick	6	6

Final
3	(Argentina) Guillermo Coria	7^{7}	3	1	0^{0}	r
2	(United States) Andy Roddick	6^{2}	6	6	0^{40}

=== Top half ===
==== Section 1 ====
First round
(Russia) N Davydenko	6	2	6
(Sweden) T Johansson	2	6	3
(France) N Escudé	4	7	6^{7}
WC	(Croatia) G Ivanišević	6	5	7^{9}
WC	(United States) A Bogomolov Jr.	6	6^{3}	4
(Slovakia) K Kučera	0	7^{7}	6
(Spain) A Martín	6	6^{3}	0
Q	(Austria) S Koubek	2	7^{7}	6

Second round
1	(Switzerland) R Federer	6	3	7
(Russia) N Davydenko	2	6	5
WC	(Croatia) G Ivanišević	4	0^{r}
32	(Spain) R Nadal	6	0
21	(Chile) F González	7	7^{9}
(Slovakia) K Kučera	5	6^{7}
Q	(Austria) S Koubek	4	0
14	(Czech Republic) J Novák	6	6

Third round
1	(Switzerland) R Federer	3	3
32	(Spain) R Nadal	6	6
21	(Chile) F González	6	6
14	(Czech Republic) J Novák	4	2

Fourth round
32	(Spain) R Nadal	6^{1}	6	2
21	(Chile) F González	7^{7}	4	6

==== Section 2 ====
First round
Q	(Russia) D Tursunov	2	6^{4}
(Romania) A Pavel	6	7^{7}
(Sweden) R Söderling	7^{7}	6
(Spain) D Ferrer	6^{5}	4
Q	(Switzerland) I Heuberger	6	4	2
(United States) T Martin	3	6	6
(Austria) J Melzer	6	6
(Croatia) I Karlović	4	4

Second round
10	(Chile) N Massú	6^{3}	1
(Romania) A Pavel	7^{7}	6
(Sweden) R Söderling	4	2
17	(Australia) L Hewitt	6	6
29	(Finland) J Nieminen	3	7	5
(United States) T Martin	6	5	7
(Austria) J Melzer	7^{7}	2	7^{7}
7	(United Kingdom) T Henman	6^{3}	6	6^{4}

Third round
(Romania) A Pavel	6	7
17	(Australia) L Hewitt	4	5
(United States) T Martin	7^{7}	6
(Austria) J Melzer	6^{4}	3

Fourth round
(Romania) A Pavel	7^{7}	7^{7}
(United States) T Martin	6^{5}	6^{1}

==== Section 3 ====
First round
(Netherlands) R Sluiter	3	1
(South Africa) W Ferreira	6	6
WC	(United States) B Baker	4	3
(France) C Saulnier	6	6
(Italy) D Sanguinetti	1	3
(Croatia) I Ljubičić	6	6
Q	(United States) J Morrison	3	6	5
Q	(France) J Benneteau	6	2	7

Second round
3	(Argentina) G Coria	7^{7}	6
(South Africa) W Ferreira	6^{2}	0
(France) C Saulnier	6	4	5
25	(Argentina) J I Chela	2	6	7
24	(France) A Clément	6	3	2
(Croatia) I Ljubičić	3	6	6
Q	(France) J Benneteau	6	6
16	(United States) M Fish	4	4

Third round
3	(Argentina) G Coria	6	3	6
25	(Argentina) J I Chela	2	6	3
(Croatia) I Ljubičić	6^{3}	1
Q	(France) J Benneteau	7^{7}	6

Fourth round
3	(Argentina) G Coria	7^{7}	2	7
Q	(France) J Benneteau	6^{3}	6	5

==== Section 4 ====
First round
(Sweden) T Enqvist	5	6	4
(Ecuador) N Lapentti	7	2	6
(Morocco) H Arazi	5	4
(France) T Ascione	7	6
(Spain) R Ramírez Hidalgo	2	2
(United States) R Ginepri	6	6
(Germany) N Kiefer	6	6
(Russia) I Andreev	3	4

Second round
12	(France) S Grosjean	6	6
(Ecuador) N Lapentti	3	4
(France) T Ascione	7^{7}	6
23	(Spain) F López	6^{4}	4
30	(Argentina) G Gaudio	6^{5}	2
(United States) R Ginepri	7^{7}	6
(Germany) N Kiefer	6	4	7^{7}
6	(Germany) R Schüttler	4	6	6^{3}

Third round
12	(France) S Grosjean	6	4	7^{7}
(France) T Ascione	3	6	6^{1}
(United States) R Ginepri	6^{3}	6	4
(Germany) N Kiefer	7^{7}	3	6

Fourth round
12	(France) S Grosjean	4	2
(Germany) N Kiefer	6	6

=== Bottom half ===
==== Section 5 ====
First round
(Armenia) S Sargsian	3	4
(Czech Republic) R Štěpánek	6	6
(United States) J Blake	7^{14}	6^{4}	1
(United States) V Spadea	6^{12}	7^{7}	6
Q	(Argentina) J Mónaco	7^{8}	6
(Sweden) J Johansson	6^{6}	2
Q	(Brazil) R Mello	7^{7}	7^{8}
Q	(United States) J Salzenstein	6^{3}	6^{6}

Second round
LL	(Spain) F Verdasco	6^{6}	6^{3}
(Czech Republic) R Štěpánek	7^{8}	7^{7}
(United States) V Spadea	7^{9}	6^{4}	6
31	(Russia) M Safin	6^{7}	7^{7}	4
18	(Brazil) G Kuerten	1	6	5
Q	(Argentina) J Mónaco	6	3	7
Q	(Brazil) R Mello	1	6	3
9	(Thailand) P Srichaphan	6	1	6

Third round
(Czech Republic) R Štěpánek	3	6	6^{3}
(United States) V Spadea	6	2	7^{7}
Q	(Argentina) J Mónaco	6	4	4
9	(Thailand) P Srichaphan	1	6	6

Fourth round
(United States) V Spadea	5	6	6
9	(Thailand) P Srichaphan	7	3	2

==== Section 6 ====
First round
(Brazil) F Saretta	4	4
WC	(Australia) T Reid	6	6
(United States) J-M Gambill	5	4
(Germany) L Burgsmüller	7	6
Q	(Argentina) F Squillari	2	6	6
(South Korea) H-T Lee	6	2	3
(France) G Carraz	4	5
(Argentina) M Zabaleta	6	7

Second round
15	(Netherlands) M Verkerk	6	4	5
WC	(Australia) T Reid	4	6	7
(Germany) L Burgsmüller	3	5
20	(Argentina) A Calleri	6	7
28	(Belarus) M Mirnyi	6	7^{7}
Q	(Argentina) F Squillari	4	6^{3}
(Argentina) M Zabaleta	0	6^{1}
4	(United States) A Agassi	6	7^{7}

Third round
WC	(Australia) T Reid	4	6^{3}
20	(Argentina) A Calleri	6	7^{7}
28	(Belarus) M Mirnyi	2	2
4	(United States) A Agassi	6	6

Fourth round
20	(Argentina) A Calleri	6	7^{7}
4	(United States) A Agassi	2	6^{2}

==== Section 7 ====
First round
(Spain) D Sánchez	6	6
(Peru) L Horna	4	4
Q	(Luxembourg) G Müller	4	5
(Czech Republic) B Ulihrach	6	7
Q	(Denmark) K Carlsen	5	1
(Belgium) O Rochus	7	6
(France) F Santoro	5	5
Q	(Czech Republic) J Hernych	7	7

Second round
5	(Spain) C Moyá	4	6	6
(Spain) D Sánchez	6	4	4
(Czech Republic) B Ulihrach	3	6	3
27	(Slovakia) D Hrbatý	6	3	6
19	(Spain) T Robredo	4	6	7^{7}
(Belgium) O Rochus	6	1	6^{3}
Q	(Czech Republic) J Hernych	6	6
11	(Australia) M Philippoussis	4	2

Third round
5	(Spain) C Moyá	7	1	6
27	(Slovakia) D Hrbatý	5	6	3
19	(Spain) T Robredo	3	6	7^{7}
Q	(Czech Republic) J Hernych	6	3	6^{4}

Fourth round
5	(Spain) C Moyá	6	6
19	(Spain) T Robredo	3	3

==== Section 8 ====
First round
(Argentina) G Cañas	6	7^{8}
WC	(Germany) T Haas	1	6^{6}
(Georgia (country)) I Labadze	2	0
(Belgium) X Malisse	6	6
(United States) T Dent	6	6
(Russia) M Youzhny	3	3
(Romania) V Hănescu	1	3
(Slovakia) K Beck	6	6

Second round
13	(Netherlands) S Schalken	1	0^{d}
(Argentina) G Cañas	6	3
(Belgium) X Malisse	6	6
22	(Spain) A Costa	4	2
26	(Sweden) J Björkman	7^{7}	6
(United States) T Dent	6^{4}	2
(Slovakia) K Beck	2	4
2	(United States) A Roddick	6	6

Third round
(Argentina) G Cañas	6	2	6
(Belgium) X Malisse	4	6	3
26	(Sweden) J Björkman	4	6	3
2	(United States) A Roddick	6	3	6

Fourth round
(Argentina) G Cañas	3	3
2	(United States) A Roddick	6	6

== Qualifying ==
=== Qualifying seeds ===
1. (France) Antony Dupuis (qualifying competition)
2. (Spain) Fernando Verdasco (qualifying competition, lucky loser)
3. (Russia) Dmitry Tursunov (qualified)
4. (Argentina) José Acasuso (first round)
5. (Croatia) Mario Ančić (first round)
6. (Austria) Stefan Koubek (qualified)
7. (France) Nicolas Mahut (first round)
8. (Denmark) Kenneth Carlsen (qualified)
9. (Spain) Àlex Corretja (first round)
10. (South Africa) Wesley Moodie (qualifying competition)
11. (Israel) Harel Levy (qualifying competition)
12. (Argentina) Martín Vassallo Argüello (first round)
13. (United States) Jeff Salzenstein (qualified)
14. (France) Julien Benneteau (qualified)
15. (United States) Brian Vahaly (qualifying competition)
16. (Argentina) Franco Squillari (qualified)
17. (Ecuador) Giovanni Lapentti (first round, retired)
18. (Switzerland) Ivo Heuberger (qualified)
19. (Brazil) Ricardo Mello (qualified)
20. (Czech Republic) Tomáš Zíb (first round)
21. (Argentina) Federico Browne (first round)
22. (United States) Jeff Morrison (qualified)
23. (United States) Robert Kendrick (qualifying competition)
24. (Peru) Iván Miranda (qualifying competition)

=== Qualifiers ===
1. (United States) Jeff Salzenstein
2. (Argentina) Juan Mónaco
3. (Russia) Dmitry Tursunov
4. (Argentina) Franco Squillari
5. (Luxembourg) Gilles Müller
6. (Austria) Stefan Koubek
7. (France) Julien Benneteau
8. (Denmark) Kenneth Carlsen
9. (Brazil) Ricardo Mello
10. (Switzerland) Ivo Heuberger
11. (United States) Jeff Morrison
12. (Czech Republic) Jan Hernych

=== Lucky loser ===
1. (Spain) Fernando Verdasco

=== Qualifying draw ===
==== First qualifier ====
First round
1	(France) Antony Dupuis	3	6	7^{7}
WC	(United States) Phillip Simmonds	6	2	6^{4}
(United States) Alex Kim	3	4
13	(United States) Jeff Salzenstein	6	6

Qualifying competition
1	(France) Antony Dupuis	3	2
13	(United States) Jeff Salzenstein	6	6

==== Second qualifier ====
First round
2	(Spain) Fernando Verdasco	6	6
(United States) Glenn Weiner	2	4
(Argentina) Juan Mónaco	5	7	4
17	(Ecuador) Giovanni Lapentti	7	5	1^{r}

Qualifying competition
2	(Spain) Fernando Verdasco	6^{2}	6	3
(Argentina) Juan Mónaco	7^{7}	3	6

==== Third qualifier ====
First round
3	(Russia) Dmitry Tursunov	6	6^{5}	6
(Croatia) Roko Karanušić	4	7^{7}	3
(Spain) Álex Calatrava	2	6	2
23	(United States) Robert Kendrick	6	0	6

Qualifying competition
3	(Russia) Dmitry Tursunov	6	6
23	(United States) Robert Kendrick	4	4

==== Fourth qualifier ====
First round
4	(Argentina) José Acasuso	6^{3}	6	1
(Germany) Florian Mayer	7^{7}	4	6
(Germany) Philipp Kohlschreiber	3	4
16	(Argentina) Franco Squillari	6	6

Qualifying competition
(Germany) Florian Mayer	2	2^{r}
16	(Argentina) Franco Squillari	6	4

==== Fifth qualifier ====
First round
5	(Croatia) Mario Ančić	4	3
(Luxembourg) Gilles Müller	6	6
(Thailand) Danai Udomchoke	5	4
24	(Peru) Iván Miranda	7	6

Qualifying competition
(Luxembourg) Gilles Müller	6	6^{4}	7^{7}
24	(Peru) Iván Miranda	4	7^{7}	6^{4}

==== Sixth qualifier ====
First round
6	(Austria) Stefan Koubek	6	6
(Canada) Frédéric Niemeyer	1	4
(Philippines) Eric Taino	6	3	6
21	(Argentina) Federico Browne	4	6	1

Qualifying competition
6	(Austria) Stefan Koubek	6	6
(Philippines) Eric Taino	4	4

==== Seventh qualifier ====
First round
7	(France) Nicolas Mahut	1	4
(Paraguay) Ramón Delgado	6	6
(Switzerland) Michel Kratochvil	6	3	2
14	(France) Julien Benneteau	3	6	6

Qualifying competition
(Paraguay) Ramón Delgado	4	6^{10}
14	(France) Julien Benneteau	6	7^{12}

==== Eighth qualifier ====
First round
8	(Denmark) Kenneth Carlsen	6	5	6
WC	(United States) Michael Russell	2	7	1
WC	(India) Prakash Amritraj	2	1
15	(United States) Brian Vahaly	6	6

Qualifying competition
8	(Denmark) Kenneth Carlsen	7^{7}	6^{3}	6
15	(United States) Brian Vahaly	6^{3}	7^{7}	4

==== Ninth qualifier ====
First round
9	(Spain) Àlex Corretja	6	5	2
(Romania) Răzvan Sabău	4	7	6
WC	(United States) Brendan Evans	4	2
19	(Brazil) Ricardo Mello	6	6

Qualifying competition
(Romania) Răzvan Sabău	6^{2}	0
19	(Brazil) Ricardo Mello	7^{7}	6

==== Tenth qualifier ====
First round
10	(South Africa) Wesley Moodie	6	6
(Norway) Jan Frode Andersen	1	2
(Argentina) Diego Veronelli	3	2
18	(Switzerland) Ivo Heuberger	6	6

Qualifying competition
10	(South Africa) Wesley Moodie	3	4
18	(Switzerland) Ivo Heuberger	6	6

==== Eleventh qualifier ====
First round
11	(Israel) Harel Levy	6	7
(France) Jérôme Golmard	1	5
WC	(United States) Amer Delić	7^{10}	6^{5}	3
22	(United States) Jeff Morrison	6^{8}	7^{7}	6

Qualifying competition
11	(Israel) Harel Levy	3	5
22	(United States) Jeff Morrison	6	7

==== Twelfth qualifier ====
First round
12	(Argentina) Martín Vassallo Argüello	6	4	5
(United Kingdom) Arvind Parmar	4	6	7
(Czech Republic) Jan Hernych	6	6
20	(Czech Republic) Tomáš Zíb	2	3

Qualifying competition
(United Kingdom) Arvind Parmar	6	2	0
(Czech Republic) Jan Hernych	4	6	6
