= 2004 NASDAQ-100 Open – Women's doubles =

Women's doubles
- 2004 NASDAQ-100 Open

Final
- Champions: (Russia) Nadia Petrova (United States) Meghann Shaughnessy
- Runners-up: (Russia) Svetlana Kuznetsova (Russia) Elena Likhovtseva
- Score: 6–2, 6–3

Details
- Draw: 32 (3WC/1Q/1PR)
- Seeds: 8

Events
Singles	men	women
Doubles	men	women
← 2003 ·	Miami Open	· 2005 →

Liezel Huber and Magdalena Maleeva were the defending champions, but competed this year with different partners. Huber teamed up with Ai Sugiyama and were eliminated in the quarterfinals, while Maleeva teamed up with Katarina Srebotnik and lost in the first round.

Nadia Petrova and Meghann Shaughnessy won the title, defeating Svetlana Kuznetsova and Elena Likhovtseva 6–2, 6–3 in the final. It was the 5th doubles title for both players in their respective careers.

== Seeds ==
1. (Spain) Virginia Ruano Pascual / (Argentina) Paola Suárez (quarterfinals)
2. (Russia) Svetlana Kuznetsova / (Russia) Elena Likhovtseva (final)
3. (South Africa) Liezel Huber / (Japan) Ai Sugiyama (quarterfinals)
4. (United States) Martina Navratilova / (United States) Lisa Raymond (semifinals)
5. (Zimbabwe) Cara Black / (Australia) Rennae Stubbs (first round)
6. (Russia) Nadia Petrova / (United States) Meghann Shaughnessy (champions)
7. (Switzerland) Myriam Casanova / (France) Émilie Loit (first round)
8. (Russia) Elena Dementieva / (Russia) Lina Krasnoroutskaya (second round)

== Draw ==
=== Key ===
- Q = Qualifier
- WC = Wild card
- LL = Lucky loser
- Alt = Alternate
- SE = Special exempt
- PR = Protected ranking
- ITF = ITF entry
- JE = Junior exempt
- w/o = Walkover
- r = Retired
- d = Defaulted
- SR = Special ranking

=== Finals ===
Semifinals
6	(Russia) Nadia Petrova (United States) Meghann Shaughnessy	6
(China) Ting Li (China) Sun Tiantian	4^{r}
4	(United States) Martina Navratilova (United States) Lisa Raymond	4	4
2	(Russia) Svetlana Kuznetsova (Russia) Elena Likhovtseva	6	6

Final
6	(Russia) Nadia Petrova (United States) Meghann Shaughnessy	6	6
2	(Russia) Svetlana Kuznetsova (Russia) Elena Likhovtseva	2	3

=== Top half ===
First round
1	(Spain) V Ruano Pascual (Argentina) P Suárez	6	6
(Bulgaria) M Maleeva (Slovenia) K Srebotnik	3	2
(Greece) E Daniilidou (Venezuela) M Vento-Kabchi	6	6
(Slovakia) D Hantuchová (United States) C Morariu	3	2
(Argentina) G Dulko (Italy) R Grande	3	6	6
(France) C Dhenin (Austria) B Schett	6	1	3
(Estonia) M Ani (Czech Republic) L Průšová	3	1
6	(Russia) N Petrova (United States) M Shaughnessy	6	6
3	(South Africa) L Huber (Japan) A Sugiyama	6	6
WC	(Russia) M Kirilenko (Russia) V Zvonareva	1	2
PR	(Romania) R Dragomir Ilie (United States) S Reeves	6	6
(Serbia and Montenegro) J Dokic (Russia) D Safina	3	3
(Australia) L McShea (Japan) N Miyagi	6^{4}	3
(China) T Li (China) T Sun	7^{7}	6
WC	(France) T Golovin (Czech Republic) N Vaidišová	1	0
8	(Russia) E Dementieva (Russia) L Krasnoroutskaya	6	6

Second round
1	(Spain) V Ruano Pascual (Argentina) P Suárez	6	6
(Greece) E Daniilidou (Venezuela) M Vento-Kabchi	4	3
(Argentina) G Dulko (Italy) R Grande
6	(Russia) N Petrova (United States) M Shaughnessy	w/o
3	(South Africa) L Huber (Japan) A Sugiyama	5	6	6
PR	(Romania) R Dragomir Ilie (United States) S Reeves	7	4	1
(China) T Li (China) T Sun	6	7
8	(Russia) E Dementieva (Russia) L Krasnoroutskaya	4	5

Quarterfinals
1	(Spain) V Ruano Pascual (Argentina) P Suárez	3	6	3
6	(Russia) N Petrova (United States) M Shaughnessy	6	3	6
3	(South Africa) L Huber (Japan) A Sugiyama	6	1	4
(China) T Li (China) T Sun	3	6	6

Semifinals
6	(Russia) N Petrova (United States) M Shaughnessy	6
(China) T Li (China) T Sun	4^{r}

=== Bottom half ===
First round
5	(Zimbabwe) C Black (Australia) R Stubbs	6	6^{6}	3
(Australia) A Molik (Spain) M Serna	2	7^{8}	6
(Italy) S Farina Elia (Italy) F Schiavone	6	6^{6}	6
(Bosnia and Herzegovina) M Jugić-Salkić (Croatia) J Kostanić	4	7^{8}	4
(Belgium) E Callens (United States) M Tu	6^{1}	0
(Japan) S Asagoe (Chinese Taipei) J Lee	7^{7}	6
Q	(United States) J Embry (Italy) M Santangelo	6^{3}	3
4	(United States) M Navratilova (United States) L Raymond	7^{7}	6
7	(Switzerland) M Casanova (France) É Loit	4	2
(Switzerland) E Gagliardi (Hungary) P Mandula	6	6
(China) Z Yan (China) J Zheng	4	6	6
(Italy) T Garbin (Slovenia) T Križan	6	1	4
WC	(Puerto Rico) K Brandi (United States) A Stevenson	6	5	2
PR	(United States) L Granville (Sweden) Å Svensson	3	7	6
(Russia) M Sharapova (Thailand) T Tanasugarn	3	2
2	(Russia) S Kuznetsova (Russia) E Likhovtseva	6	6

Second round
(Australia) A Molik (Spain) M Serna	6	6
(Italy) S Farina Elia (Italy) F Schiavone	2	4
(Japan) S Asagoe (Chinese Taipei) J Lee	1	4
4	(United States) M Navratilova (United States) L Raymond	6	6
(Switzerland) E Gagliardi (Hungary) P Mandula	2	2
(China) Z Yan (China) J Zheng	6	6
PR	(United States) L Granville (Sweden) Å Svensson	7^{7}	3	2
2	(Russia) S Kuznetsova (Russia) E Likhovtseva	6^{0}	6	6

Quarterfinals
(Australia) A Molik (Spain) M Serna	2	6	4
4	(United States) M Navratilova (United States) L Raymond	6	3	6
(China) Z Yan (China) J Zheng	4	0
2	(Russia) S Kuznetsova (Russia) E Likhovtseva	6	6

Semifinals
4	(United States) M Navratilova (United States) L Raymond	4	4
2	(Russia) S Kuznetsova (Russia) E Likhovtseva	6	6

== Qualifying ==
=== Qualifying seeds ===
1. (Russia) Alina Jidkova / (Slovakia) Henrieta Nagyová (second round)
2. (Ukraine) Tatiana Perebiynis / (Croatia) Silvija Talaja (first round)

=== Qualifiers ===
1. (United States) Jennifer Embry / (Italy) Mara Santangelo

=== Qualifying draw ===
First round
1	(Russia) A Jidkova (Slovakia) H Nagyová	8
(United States) T Ashley (United States) J Craybas	2
(Australia) B Stewart (Australia) S Stosur	5
(United States) J Embry (Italy) M Santangelo	8
(United States) A Harkleroad (Japan) A Morigami	8
WC	(United States) A Haynes (Ukraine) V Kutuzova	4
(United States) A Cargill (United States) J Ditty	8
2	(Ukraine) T Perebiynis (Croatia) S Talaja	4

Second round
1	(Russia) A Jidkova (Slovakia) H Nagyová	3
(United States) J Embry (Italy) M Santangelo	8
(United States) A Harkleroad (Japan) A Morigami	8
(United States) A Cargill (United States) J Ditty	1

Qualifying competition
(United States) J Embry (Italy) M Santangelo	6	6
(United States) A Harkleroad (Japan) A Morigami	2	3
