= 2004 NASDAQ-100 Open – Men's doubles =

Men's doubles
- 2004 NASDAQ-100 Open

Final
- Champions: (Zimbabwe) Wayne Black (Zimbabwe) Kevin Ullyett
- Runners-up: (Sweden) Jonas Björkman (Australia) Todd Woodbridge
- Score: 6–2, 7–6^{(14–12)}

Events
Singles	men	women
Doubles	men	women
← 2003 ·	NASDAQ-100 Open	· 2005 →

Roger Federer and Max Mirnyi were the defending champions but only Mirnyi competed that year with Mahesh Bhupathi.

Bhupathi and Mirnyi lost in the second round to Arnaud Clément and Sébastien Grosjean.

Wayne Black and Kevin Ullyett won in the final 6–2, 7–6^{(14–12)} against Jonas Björkman and Todd Woodbridge.

== Seeds ==
1. (United States) Bob Bryan / (United States) Mike Bryan (semifinals)
2. (India) Mahesh Bhupathi / (Belarus) Max Mirnyi (second round)
3. (Sweden) Jonas Björkman / (Australia) Todd Woodbridge (final)
4. (Australia) Paul Hanley / (France) Fabrice Santoro (quarterfinals)
5. (The Bahamas) Mark Knowles / (Canada) Daniel Nestor (semifinals)
6. (Czech Republic) Martin Damm / (Czech Republic) Cyril Suk (quarterfinals)
7. (India) Leander Paes / (Czech Republic) David Rikl (quarterfinals)
8. (Zimbabwe) Wayne Black / (Zimbabwe) Kevin Ullyett (champions)

== Draw ==
=== Key ===
- Q = Qualifier
- WC = Wild card
- LL = Lucky loser
- Alt = Alternate
- SE = Special exempt
- PR = Protected ranking
- ITF = ITF entry
- JE = Junior exempt
- w/o = Walkover
- r = Retired
- d = Defaulted
- SR = Special ranking

=== Final ===
Semifinals
1	(United States) Bob Bryan (United States) Mike Bryan	2	5
8	(Zimbabwe) Wayne Black (Zimbabwe) Kevin Ullyett	6	7
3	(Sweden) Jonas Björkman (Australia) Todd Woodbridge	3	7^{8}	6
5	(The Bahamas) Mark Knowles (Canada) Daniel Nestor	6	6^{6}	2

Final
8	(Zimbabwe) Wayne Black (Zimbabwe) Kevin Ullyett	6	7^{14}
3	(Sweden) Jonas Björkman (Australia) Todd Woodbridge	2	6^{12}

=== Top half ===
First round
1	(United States) B Bryan (United States) M Bryan	7^{7}	6
WC	(United States) A Delic (United States) T Martin	6^{3}	2
(Argentina) G Etlis (Argentina) M Rodríguez	7^{7}	4	6^{4}
(Switzerland) Y Allegro (South Africa) R Koenig	6^{3}	6	7^{7}
(Poland) M Fyrstenberg (Poland) M Matkowski	5	3
(Spain) R Nadal (Spain) T Robredo	7	6
WC	(United States) A Bogomolov Jr. (United States) T Dent	6^{5}	6	3
6	(Czech Republic) M Damm (Czech Republic) C Suk	7^{7}	4	6
4	(Australia) P Hanley (France) F Santoro	6^{4}	6	6
(South Africa) J Coetzee (South Africa) C Haggard	7^{7}	4	3
(Armenia) S Sargsian (Serbia and Montenegro) N Zimonjić	7	5	6
(Argentina) J I Chela (Chile) N Massú	5	7	2
(Argentina) M García (Argentina) M Hood	4	6	6
(Sweden) S Aspelin (Italy) M Bertolini	6	3	2
(Austria) J Knowle (Czech Republic) P Pála	5	3
8	(Zimbabwe) W Black (Zimbabwe) K Ullyett	7	6

Second round
1	(United States) B Bryan (United States) M Bryan	6	6
(Switzerland) Y Allegro (South Africa) R Koenig	2	2
(Spain) R Nadal (Spain) T Robredo
6	(Czech Republic) M Damm (Czech Republic) C Suk	w/o
4	(Australia) P Hanley (France) F Santoro	7^{7}	6
(Armenia) S Sargsian (Serbia and Montenegro) N Zimonjić	6^{0}	3
(Argentina) M García (Argentina) M Hood	7	3	4
8	(Zimbabwe) W Black (Zimbabwe) K Ullyett	5	6	6

Quarterfinals
1	(United States) B Bryan (United States) M Bryan	6	7^{8}
6	(Czech Republic) M Damm (Czech Republic) C Suk	4	6^{6}
4	(Australia) P Hanley (France) F Santoro	1	5
8	(Zimbabwe) W Black (Zimbabwe) K Ullyett	6	7

Semifinals
1	(United States) B Bryan (United States) M Bryan	2	5
8	(Zimbabwe) W Black (Zimbabwe) K Ullyett	6	7

=== Bottom half ===
First round
7	(India) L Paes (Czech Republic) D Rikl	6	6
(Argentina) S Prieto (Brazil) A Sá	4	1
(Spain) A Costa (Netherlands) M Verkerk	1^{r}
(United States) J Palmer (Czech Republic) P Vízner	4
(Czech Republic) J Novák (Czech Republic) R Štěpánek	5	3
(Israel) J Erlich (Israel) A Ram	7	6
(United States) R Leach (United States) B MacPhie	4	3
3	(Sweden) J Björkman (Australia) T Woodbridge	6	6
5	(The Bahamas) M Knowles (Canada) D Nestor	6	6
(Chile) F González (Spain) F López	1	4
(Czech Republic) T Cibulec (Czech Republic) L Friedl	4	6	6
(Australia) M Philippoussis (Russia) M Safin	6	3	2
(France) A Clément (France) S Grosjean	6	3
(Argentina) L Arnold (Argentina) A Calleri	1	0^{r}
(Germany) N Kiefer (Germany) R Schüttler	4	0
2	(India) M Bhupathi (Belarus) M Mirnyi	6	6

Second round
7	(India) L Paes (Czech Republic) D Rikl	6	7^{7}
(United States) J Palmer (Czech Republic) P Vízner	3	6^{1}
(Israel) J Erlich (Israel) A Ram	4	4
3	(Sweden) J Björkman (Australia) T Woodbridge	6	6
5	(The Bahamas) M Knowles (Canada) D Nestor	7^{10}	6
(Czech Republic) T Cibulec (Czech Republic) L Friedl	6^{8}	4
(France) A Clément (France) S Grosjean	7^{7}	7
2	(India) M Bhupathi (Belarus) M Mirnyi	6^{3}	5

Quarterfinals
7	(India) L Paes (Czech Republic) D Rikl	7	2	3
3	(Sweden) J Björkman (Australia) T Woodbridge	5	6	6
5	(The Bahamas) M Knowles (Canada) D Nestor	6	7
(France) A Clément (France) S Grosjean	4	5

Semifinals
3	(Sweden) J Björkman (Australia) T Woodbridge	3	7^{8}	6
5	(The Bahamas) M Knowles (Canada) D Nestor	6	6^{6}	2
