= 2004 NASDAQ-100 Open – Women's singles =

Women's singles
- 2004 NASDAQ-100 Open

Final
- Champion: (United States) Serena Williams
- Runner-up: (Russia) Elena Dementieva
- Score: 6–1, 6–1

Details
- Draw: 96 (9WC/12Q/2LL/6PR)
- Seeds: 32

Events
Singles	men	women
Doubles	men	women
← 2003 ·	Miami Open	· 2005 →

Two-time defending champion Serena Williams defeated Elena Dementieva in the final, 6–1, 6–1 to win the women's singles tennis title at the 2004 Miami Open.

This tournament marked the first career meeting between Serena Williams and Maria Sharapova; Williams won in straight sets in their fourth-round encounter.

== Seeds ==
All seeded players received a bye into the second round.

1. (United States) Serena Williams (champion)
2. (United States) Venus Williams (quarterfinals)
3. (Russia) Anastasia Myskina (withdrew due to left toe sprain)
4. (United States) Jennifer Capriati (third round)
5. (Russia) Elena Dementieva (final)
6. (Japan) Ai Sugiyama (second round)
7. (Russia) Vera Zvonareva (third round)
8. (Russia) Nadia Petrova (semifinals)
9. (Argentina) Paola Suárez (fourth round)
10. (Russia) Svetlana Kuznetsova (fourth round)
11. (Italy) Silvia Farina Elia (third round)
12. (Australia) Jelena Dokić (fourth round)
13. (Israel) Anna Smashnova-Pistolesi (third round)
14. (Bulgaria) Magdalena Maleeva (second round)
15. (Italy) Francesca Schiavone (fourth round)
16. (Colombia) Fabiola Zuluaga (second round)
17. (Russia) Maria Sharapova (fourth round)
18. (Spain) Magüi Serna (third round)
19. (United States) Meghann Shaughnessy (second round)
20. (United States) Lisa Raymond (third round)
21. (France) Nathalie Dechy (quarterfinals)
22. (Slovenia) Tina Pisnik (second round)
23. (Russia) Dinara Safina (second round)
24. (Australia) Alicia Molik (fourth round)
25. (Greece) Eleni Daniilidou (semifinals)
26. (Spain) María Sánchez Lorenzo (third round)
27. (Slovakia) Daniela Hantuchová (third round)
28. (Russia) Lina Krasnoroutskaya (second round)
29. (Croatia) Karolina Šprem (quarterfinals)
30. (Hungary) Petra Mandula (second round)
31. (Russia) Elena Likhovtseva (third round)
32. (France) Émilie Loit (third round)

== Draw ==
=== Key ===
- Q = Qualifier
- WC = Wild card
- LL = Lucky loser
- Alt = Alternate
- SE = Special exempt
- PR = Protected ranking
- ITF = ITF entry
- JE = Junior exempt
- w/o = Walkover
- r = Retired
- d = Defaulted
- SR = Special ranking

=== Finals ===
Quarterfinals
1/PR	(United States) Serena Williams	6	6
(United States) Jill Craybas	0	1
25	(Greece) Eleni Daniilidou	6	6
29	(Croatia) Karolina Šprem	1	3
8	(Russia) Nadia Petrova	6	6
21	(France) Nathalie Dechy	2	2
5	(Russia) Elena Dementieva	6	5	7
2/PR	(United States) Venus Williams	3	7	6^{3}

Semifinals
1/PR	(United States) Serena Williams	6	6
25	(Greece) Eleni Daniilidou	4	4
8	(Russia) Nadia Petrova	4	2
5	(Russia) Elena Dementieva	6	6

Final
1/PR	(United States) Serena Williams	6	6
5	(Russia) Elena Dementieva	1	1

=== Top half ===
==== Section 1 ====
First round
Q	(Spain) M Marrero	7	7
WC	(United States) A Haynes	6^{3}	6^{1}
Q	(Czech Republic) B Strýcová	7	7
(United States) S Reeves	6^{3}	3
(Slovenia) K Srebotnik	1	6^{5}
(Japan) S Asagoe	6	7
WC	(Croatia) I Majoli	2	6	3
Q	(Italy) R Grande	6	1	6

Second round
1/PR	(United States) S Williams	6	6
Q	(Spain) M Marrero	1	0
Q	(Czech Republic) B Strýcová	1	4
31	(Russia) E Likhovtseva	6	6
17	(Russia) M Sharapova	6	3	6
(Japan) S Asagoe	2	6	0
Q	(Italy) R Grande	1	3
13	(Israel) A Smashnova-Pistolesi	6	6

Third round
1/PR	(United States) S Williams	6	4	6
31	(Russia) E Likhovtseva	1	6	3
17	(Russia) M Sharapova	7	6
13	(Israel) A Smashnova-Pistolesi	5	2

Fourth round
1/PR	(United States) S Williams	6	6
17	(Russia) M Sharapova	4	3

==== Section 2 ====
First round
(Czech Republic) D Chládková	6^{4}	6	6
(Slovakia) L Cervanová	7	4	4
(Switzerland) M Casanova	4	4
WC	(United States) J Jackson	6	6
(United States) A Harkleroad	2	0	r
(United States) J Craybas	6	3
(Italy) T Garbin	6	6
(Hungary) M Czink	3	3

Second round
9	(Argentina) P Suárez	6	6
(Czech Republic) D Chládková	1	2
WC	(United States) J Jackson	6	6^{5}	1
18	(Spain) M Serna	3	7	6
30	(Hungary) P Mandula	6^{5}	2
(United States) J Craybas	7	6
(Italy) T Garbin	3	6^{3}
7	(Russia) V Zvonareva	6	7

Third round
9	(Argentina) P Suárez	6	6
18	(Spain) M Serna	4	2
(United States) J Craybas	6	3	6
7	(Russia) V Zvonareva	2	6	3

Fourth round
9	(Argentina) P Suárez	6	4	6^{2}
(United States) J Craybas	4	6	7

==== Section 3 ====
First round
(United States) A Stevenson	7	5	0
(Czech Republic) K Koukalová	5	7	6
(Japan) A Morigami	6	6
(United States) T Snyder	4	2
(Spain) A Medina Garrigues	3	1
WC	(France) T Golovin	6	6
(Serbia and Montenegro) J Janković	6	5	6
(Luxembourg) C Schaul	1	7	3

Second round
4	(United States) J Capriati	6	6
(Czech Republic) K Koukalová	0	1
(Japan) A Morigami	3	3
25	(Greece) E Daniilidou	6	6
23	(Russia) D Safina	1	2
WC	(France) T Golovin	6	6
(Serbia and Montenegro) J Janković	7	6
14	(Bulgaria) M Maleeva	6^{5}	2

Third round
4	(United States) J Capriati	2	4
25	(Greece) E Daniilidou	6	6
WC	(France) T Golovin	6^{4}	6	7
(Serbia and Montenegro) J Janković	7	1	5

Fourth round
25	(Greece) E Daniilidou	7	6
WC	(France) T Golovin	6^{8}	1

==== Section 4 ====
First round
(Luxembourg) A Kremer	6	7
(South Korea) Y-J Cho	4	6^{7}
Q	(China) T-T Sun	7	2	1
(Hungary) A Kapros	5	6	6
Q	(United States) L Lee-Waters	6	7
(Ukraine) J Vakulenko	3	6^{2}
(Venezuela) M Vento-Kabchi	7	7
Q	(France) C Pin	6^{4}	5

Second round
10	(Russia) S Kuznetsova	7	6
(Luxembourg) A Kremer	5	3
(Hungary) A Kapros	6	1	6
22	(Slovenia) T Pisnik	3	6	4
29	(Croatia) K Šprem	6	6
Q	(United States) L Lee-Waters	1	2
(Venezuela) M Vento-Kabchi	6	7
6	(Japan) A Sugiyama	1	5

Third round
10	(Russia) S Kuznetsova	2	7	6
(Hungary) A Kapros	6	6^{4}	3
29	(Croatia) K Šprem	4	6	6
(Venezuela) M Vento-Kabchi	6	3	0

Fourth round
10	(Russia) S Kuznetsova	6	5	4
29	(Croatia) K Šprem	3	7	6

=== Bottom half ===
==== Section 5 ====
First round
(Belgium) E Callens	7	1	6^{3}
Q	(Russia) M Kirilenko	6^{3}	6	7
(Germany) A Barna	4	7	1
(Argentina) M Díaz Oliva	6	5	6
(United States) A Frazier	6	6
(Zimbabwe) C Black	4	2
Q	(Italy) M Santangelo	3	6	6
(Slovakia) M Suchá	2	0	4

Second round
8	(Russia) N Petrova	6	6
Q	(Russia) M Kirilenko	2	0
(Argentina) M Díaz Oliva	1	6^{4}
32	(France) É Loit	6	7
24	(Australia) A Molik	4	7	6
(United States) A Frazier	6	5	2
Q	(Italy) M Santangelo	6	3	6^{3}
11	(Italy) S Farina Elia	3	6	7

Third round
8	(Russia) N Petrova	6	6
32	(France) É Loit	1	3
24	(Australia) A Molik	6	6^{5}	6
11	(Italy) S Farina Elia	3	7	4

Fourth round
8	(Russia) N Petrova	6	6
24	(Australia) A Molik	2	1

==== Section 6 ====
First round
WC	(United States) S Perry	6	6
(Germany) M Weingertner	2	1
(Ukraine) T Perebiynis	6	7
(United States) L Granville	3	6^{6}
Q	(Russia) V Douchevina	6	6
(Switzerland) E Gagliardi	2	4
WC	(United States) M Irvin	3	4
WC	(Ukraine) V Kutuzova	6	6

Second round
16	(Colombia) F Zuluaga	7	5	1
WC	(United States) S Perry	6^{3}	7	6
(Ukraine) T Perebiynis	6	6^{6}	4
21	(France) N Dechy	4	7	6
28	(Russia) L Krasnoroutskaya	0	5
Q	(Russia) V Douchevina	6	7
WC	(Ukraine) V Kutuzova	4	1	r
LL	(Argentina) G Dulko	6	4

Third round
WC	(United States) S Perry	2	2
21	(France) N Dechy	6	6
Q	(Russia) V Douchevina	6^{4}	4
LL	(Argentina) G Dulko	7	6

Fourth round
21	(France) N Dechy	6	6
LL	(Argentina) G Dulko	3	2

==== Section 7 ====
First round
Q	(Romania) R Dragomir Ilie	6	6
(Czech Republic) Z Ondrášková	4	4
Q	(Russia) A Jidkova	3	6	0
(Japan) S Obata	6	3	6
(Croatia) J Kostanić	5	2
(Puerto Rico) K Brandi	7	6
(Australia) N Pratt	7	6^{2}	6
(Spain) A Parra	6^{3}	7	4

Second round
5	(Russia) E Dementieva	6	6
Q	(Romania) R Dragomir Ilie	4	1
(Japan) S Obata	6	4	2
26	(Spain) M Sánchez Lorenzo	3	6	6
19	(United States) M Shaughnessy	5	6	5
(Puerto Rico) K Brandi	7	4	7
(Australia) N Pratt
12	(Australia) J Dokić	w	/	o

Third round
5	(Russia) E Dementieva	6	6
26	(Spain) M Sánchez Lorenzo	4	3
(Puerto Rico) K Brandi	5	4
12	(Australia) J Dokić	7	6

Fourth round
5	(Russia) E Dementieva	5	6	6
12	(Australia) J Dokić	7	1	3

==== Section 8 ====
First round
WC	(Czech Republic) N Vaidišová	2	4
(Slovakia) L Kurhajcová	6	6
(Austria) B Schett	4	2
(Russia) T Panova	6	6
(Spain) V Ruano Pascual	1	3
(Thailand) T Tanasugarn	6	6
LL	(Czech Republic) S Kleinová	4	0
(China) J Zheng	6	6

Second round
15	(Italy) F Schiavone	7	6
(Slovakia) L Kurhajcová	1	3
(Russia) T Panova	7	5	1
20	(United States) L Raymond	5	7	6
27	(Slovakia) D Hantuchová	7	3	6
(Thailand) T Tanasugarn	6^{2}	6	0
(China) J Zheng	4	4
2/PR	(United States) V Williams	6	6

Third round
15	(Italy) F Schiavone	6	6
20	(United States) L Raymond	3	4
27	(Slovakia) D Hantuchová	6^{0}	2
2/PR	(United States) V Williams	7	6

Fourth round
15	(Italy) F Schiavone	1	3
2/PR	(United States) V Williams	6	6

== Qualifying ==
=== Qualifying seeds ===
1. (Italy) Flavia Pennetta (first round)
2. (Italy) Rita Grande (qualified)
3. (Switzerland) Marie-Gaïané Mikaelian (first round)
4. (Italy) Mara Santangelo (qualified)
5. (Czech Republic) Sandra Kleinová (qualifying competition, Lucky loser)
6. (Slovakia) Henrieta Nagyová (first round)
7. (Spain) Marta Marrero (qualified)
8. (Russia) Vera Dushevina (qualified)
9. (Argentina) Gisela Dulko (qualifying competition, Lucky loser)
10. (Spain) Gala León García (first round)
11. (United States) Lindsay Lee-Waters (qualifiers)
12. (Madagascar) Dally Randriantefy (first round)
13. (Croatia) Silvija Talaja (qualifying competition)
14. (Czech Republic) Eva Birnerová (first round)
15. (Bosnia and Herzegovina) Mervana Jugić-Salkić (first round)
16. (Spain) Conchita Martínez Granados (qualifying competition)
17. (Russia) Alina Jidkova (qualified)
18. (Germany) Julia Schruff (qualifying competition)
19. (Germany) Anna-Lena Grönefeld (qualifying competition)
20. (United States) Tara Snyder (qualified)
21. (Sweden) Sofia Arvidsson (first round)
22. (Australia) Samantha Stosur (first round)
23. (Czech Republic) Barbora Strýcová (qualified)
24. (Russia) Maria Kirilenko (qualified)

=== Qualifiers ===
1. (United States) Tara Snyder
2. (Italy) Rita Grande
3. (Russia) Alina Jidkova
4. (Italy) Mara Santangelo
5. (China) Sun Tiantian
6. (Russia) Maria Kirilenko
7. (Spain) Marta Marrero
8. (Russia) Vera Dushevina
9. (Czech Republic) Barbora Strýcová
10. (Romania) Ruxandra Dragomir Ilie
11. (United States) Lindsay Lee-Waters
12. (France) Camille Pin

=== Lucky losers ===
1. (Czech Republic) Sandra Kleinová
2. (Argentina) Gisela Dulko

=== Qualifying draw ===
==== First qualifier ====
First round					Qualifying competition
1	(Italy) Flavia Pennetta	3	6	6^{3}
	(United States) Teryn Ashley	6	4	7^{7}		(United States) Teryn Ashley	5	2
WC	(United States) Neha Uberoi	4	5		20	(United States) Tara Snyder	7	6
20	(United States) Tara Snyder	6	7

==== Second qualifier ====
First round				Qualifying competition
2	(Italy) Rita Grande	6	6
	(Germany) Stephanie Gehrlein	2	3	2	(Italy) Rita Grande	6	6
	(Ukraine) Yuliana Fedak	7	6		(Ukraine) Yuliana Fedak	3	2
WC/22	(Australia) Samantha Stosur	5	4

==== Third qualifier ====
First round				Qualifying competition
3	(Switzerland) Marie-Gaïané Mikaelian	2	2
	(Estonia) Maret Ani	6	6		(Estonia) Maret Ani	7^{9}	4	5
	(United States) Ansley Cargill	0	0	17	(Russia) Alina Jidkova	6^{7}	6	7
17	(Russia) Alina Jidkova	6	6

==== Fourth qualifier ====
First round				Qualifying competition
4	(Italy) Mara Santangelo	6	6
	(Canada) Maureen Drake	0	4	4	(Italy) Mara Santangelo	6	6
	(France) Stéphanie Foretz	4	3	18	(Germany) Julia Schruff	1	2
18	(Germany) Julia Schruff	6	6

==== Fifth qualifier ====
First round					Qualifying competition
5	(Czech Republic) Sandra Kleinová	3	6	6
	(United States) Meilen Tu	6	2	3	5	(Czech Republic) Sandra Kleinová	1	6	3
	(China) Sun Tiantian	2	7	7		(China) Sun Tiantian	6	1	6
14	(Czech Republic) Eva Birnerová	6	5	5

==== Sixth qualifier ====
First round					Qualifying competition
6	(Slovakia) Henrieta Nagyová	3	4
WC	(United States) Jessica Kirkland	6	6		WC	(United States) Jessica Kirkland	6^{1}	6	4
	(China) Yan Zi	4	6	3	24	(Russia) Maria Kirilenko	7^{7}	4	6
24	(Russia) Maria Kirilenko	6	1	6

==== Seventh qualifier ====
First round					Qualifying competition
7	(Spain) Marta Marrero	6	6
	(Spain) Cristina Torrens Valero	2	1		7	(Spain) Marta Marrero	6	6
	(Sweden) Åsa Svensson	1	6	6		(Sweden) Åsa Svensson	3	0
21	(Sweden) Sofia Arvidsson	6	4	0

==== Eighth qualifier ====
First round					Qualifying competition
8	(Russia) Vera Dushevina	6	6
	(France) Séverine Beltrame	1	0		8	(Russia) Vera Dushevina	6	6
	(Argentina) Natalia Gussoni	7^{7}	4	6		(Argentina) Natalia Gussoni	3	1
15	(Bosnia and Herzegovina) Mervana Jugić-Salkić	6^{5}	6	1

==== Ninth qualifier ====
First round					Qualifying competition
9	(Argentina) Gisela Dulko	6	7^{7}
WC	(Israel) Shahar Pe'er	3	6^{3}		9	(Argentina) Gisela Dulko	5	2
	(Ukraine) Yuliya Beygelzimer	6	4	1	23	(Czech Republic) Barbora Strýcová	7	6
23	(Czech Republic) Barbora Strýcová	2	6	6

==== Tenth qualifier ====
First round					Qualifying competition
10	(Spain) Gala León García	3	4
	(Romania) Ruxandra Dragomir Ilie	6	6			(Romania) Ruxandra Dragomir Ilie	6	6
	(Slovakia) Eva Fislová	4	6	1	19	(Germany) Anna-Lena Grönefeld	4	4
19	(Germany) Anna-Lena Grönefeld	6	2	6

==== Eleventh qualifier ====
First round					Qualifying competition
11	(United States) Lindsay Lee-Waters	6	5	6
	(Colombia) Catalina Castaño	3	7	3	11	(United States) Lindsay Lee-Waters	7^{7}	4	6
WC	(United States) Varvara Lepchenko	1	5		13	(Croatia) Silvija Talaja	6^{4}	6	4
13	(Croatia) Silvija Talaja	6	7

==== Twelfth qualifier ====
First round					Qualifying competition
12	(Madagascar) Dally Randriantefy	6^{3}	6^{5}
	(France) Camille Pin	7^{7}	7^{7}			(France) Camille Pin	6	6
WC	(United States) Sarah Taylor	2	6	1	16	(Spain) Conchita Martínez Granados	4	1
16	(Spain) Conchita Martínez Granados	6	4	6
