= 2004 NASDAQ-100 Open =

- Date: March 24 – April 4
- Edition: 20th
- Category: ATP Masters Series (men); Tier I Series (women)
- Surface: Hard / outdoor
- Location: Key Biscayne, Florida, U.S.
- Venue: Tennis Center at Crandon Park

Champions

Men's singles
- (United States) Andy Roddick

Women's singles
- (United States) Serena Williams

Men's doubles
- (Zimbabwe) Wayne Black / (Zimbabwe) Kevin Ullyett

Women's doubles
- (Russia) Nadia Petrova / (United States) Meghann Shaughnessy
- Miami Open

The 2004 NASDAQ-100 Open was a tennis tournament played on outdoor hard courts. It was the 20th edition of the Miami Masters and was part of the Masters Series of the 2004 ATP Tour and of Tier I of the 2004 WTA Tour. Both the men's and women's events took place at the Tennis Center at Crandon Park in Key Biscayne, Florida in the United States from March 24 through April 4, 2004.

The men's tournament was notable as it featured the first meeting between Roger Federer and Rafael Nadal, with Nadal winning in straight sets. The women’s tournament was also notable for featuring the first meeting between Maria Sharapova and Serena Williams, with Williams winning in straight sets.

== Finals ==
=== Men's singles ===
(United States) Andy Roddick defeated (Argentina) Guillermo Coria 6–7^{(2–7)}, 6–3, 6–1 (Coria retired)

- It was Roddick's 2nd title of the year and the 15th of his career. It was his 1st Masters title of the year and his 3rd overall.

=== Women's singles ===
(United States) Serena Williams defeated (Russia) Elena Dementieva 6–1, 6–1

- It was Williams' 1st title of the year and the 24th of her career. It was her 1st Tier I title of the year and her 7th overall.

=== Men's doubles ===
(Zimbabwe) Wayne Black / (Zimbabwe) Kevin Ullyett defeated (Sweden) Jonas Björkman / (Australia) Todd Woodbridge 6–2, 7–6^{(14–12)}

- It was Black's 1st title of the year and the 15th of his career. It was Ullyett's 1st title of the year and the 21st of his career.

=== Women's doubles ===
(Russia) Nadia Petrova / (United States) Meghann Shaughnessy defeated (Russia) Svetlana Kuznetsova / (Russia) Elena Likhovtseva 6–2, 6–3

- It was Petrova's 1st title of the year and the 5th of her career. It was Shaughnessy's 1st title of the year and the 8th of her career.
