= 2004 ATP Tour =

Men's tennis circuit

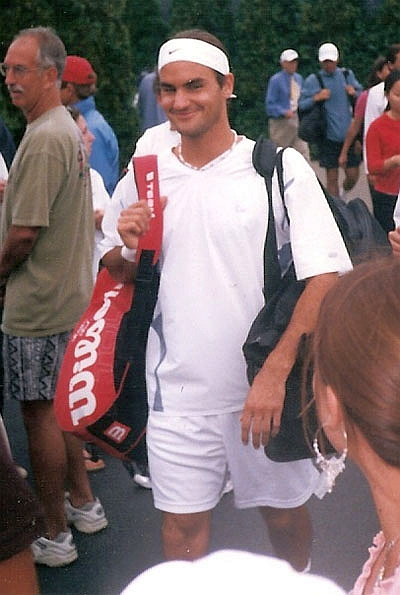
- Roger Federer finished the year ranked world No. 1 for the first time in his career. He won eleven tournaments during the season, including three majors at the Australian Open, the Wimbledon Championships, and the US Open, as well as the Tennis Masters Cup. He also won three Masters Series events.

Details
- Duration: 3 January – 8 November 2004
- Edition: 35th
- Tournaments: 68
- Categories: Grand Slam (4); ATP Masters Series (9); ATP International Series Gold (9); ATP International Series (44)

Achievements (singles)
- Most titles: (Switzerland) Roger Federer (11)
- Most finals: (Switzerland) Roger Federer (11)
- Prize money leader: (Switzerland) Roger Federer ($6,357,547)
- Points leader: (Switzerland) Roger Federer (6,335)

Awards
- Player of the year: (Switzerland) Roger Federer
- Doubles team of the year: (The Bahamas) Mark Knowles (Canada) Daniel Nestor
- Most improved player of the year: (Sweden) Joachim Johansson
- Newcomer of the year: (Germany) Florian Mayer
- Comeback player of the year: (Germany) Tommy Haas

The 2004 ATP Tour was the global elite men's professional tennis circuit organised by the Association of Tennis Professionals (ATP) for the 2004 tennis season. The ATP Tour is the elite tour for professional tennis organised by the ATP. The ATP Tour includes the four Grand Slam tournaments, the Tennis Masters Cup, the ATP Masters Series, the International Series Gold and the International Series tournaments.

== Schedule ==
The table below shows the 2004 ATP Tour schedule.

Key

Grand Slam tournaments
Tennis Masters Cup
ATP Tennis Masters Series
ATP International Series Gold
ATP International Series
Team events

=== January ===
Week	Tournament	Champions	Runners-up	Semifinalists	Quarterfinalists
5 Jan	Hopman Cup; Perth, Australia; Hopman Cup; Hard (i) – 8 teams (RR)	United States; 2–1	Slovakia	Round Robin losers (Group A) France; Russia; Czech Republic	Round Robin losers (Group B) Australia; Belgium; Hungary
5 Jan	AAPT Championships; Adelaide, Australia; International Series $380,000 – hard Singles – Doubles	(Slovakia) Dominik Hrbatý; 6–4, 6–0	(France) Michaël Llodra	(Finland) Jarkko Nieminen (United States) Taylor Dent	(Australia) Todd Reid (France) Cyril Saulnier (Sweden) Thomas Johansson (United States) Vincent Spadea
5 Jan	AAPT Championships; Adelaide, Australia; International Series $380,000 – hard Singles – Doubles	(United States) Bob Bryan (United States) Mike Bryan; 7–5, 6–3	(France) Arnaud Clément (France) Michaël Llodra	(Finland) Jarkko Nieminen (United States) Taylor Dent	(Australia) Todd Reid (France) Cyril Saulnier (Sweden) Thomas Johansson (United States) Vincent Spadea
5 Jan	Chennai Open; Chennai, India; International Series $380,000 – hard Singles – Doubles	(Spain) Carlos Moyà; 6–4, 3–6, 7–6^{(7–5)}	(Thailand) Paradorn Srichaphan	(Netherlands) Sjeng Schalken (Spain) Tommy Robredo	(France) Thierry Ascione (Spain) Félix Mantilla (France) Jean-René Lisnard (Russia) Igor Andreev
5 Jan	Chennai Open; Chennai, India; International Series $380,000 – hard Singles – Doubles	(Spain) Rafael Nadal (Spain) Tommy Robredo; 7–6^{(7–3)}, 4–6, 6–3	(Israel) Jonathan Erlich (Israel) Andy Ram	(Netherlands) Sjeng Schalken (Spain) Tommy Robredo	(France) Thierry Ascione (Spain) Félix Mantilla (France) Jean-René Lisnard (Russia) Igor Andreev
5 Jan	Qatar Open; Doha, Qatar; International Series $1,000,000 – hard Singles – Doubles	(France) Nicolas Escudé; 6–3, 7–6^{(7–4)}	(Croatia) Ivan Ljubičić	(Argentina) Agustín Calleri (United Kingdom) Tim Henman	(Sweden) Jonas Björkman (South Korea) Hyung-Taik Lee (France) Sébastien Grosjean (Armenia) Sargis Sargsian
5 Jan	Qatar Open; Doha, Qatar; International Series $1,000,000 – hard Singles – Doubles	(Czech Republic) Martin Damm (Czech Republic) Cyril Suk; 6–2, 6–4	(Austria) Stefan Koubek (United States) Andy Roddick	(Argentina) Agustín Calleri (United Kingdom) Tim Henman	(Sweden) Jonas Björkman (South Korea) Hyung-Taik Lee (France) Sébastien Grosjean (Armenia) Sargis Sargsian
12 Jan	Heineken Open; Auckland, New Zealand; International Series $404,000 – hard Singles – Doubles	(Slovakia) Dominik Hrbatý; 4–6, 6–2, 7–5	(Spain) Rafael Nadal	(Brazil) Gustavo Kuerten (Czech Republic) Jiří Novák	(Germany) Philipp Kohlschreiber (United States) Vincent Spadea (France) Gregory Carraz (Netherlands) Raemon Sluiter
12 Jan	Heineken Open; Auckland, New Zealand; International Series $404,000 – hard Singles – Doubles	(India) Mahesh Bhupathi (France) Fabrice Santoro; 4–6, 7–5, 6–3	(Czech Republic) Jiří Novák (Czech Republic) Radek Štěpánek	(Brazil) Gustavo Kuerten (Czech Republic) Jiří Novák	(Germany) Philipp Kohlschreiber (United States) Vincent Spadea (France) Gregory Carraz (Netherlands) Raemon Sluiter
12 Jan	Adidas International; Sydney, Australia; International Series $380,000 – hard Singles – Doubles	(Australia) Lleyton Hewitt; 4–3 ret.	(Spain) Carlos Moyà	(South Africa) Wayne Ferreira (Netherlands) Martin Verkerk	(Australia) Todd Reid (Spain) Tommy Robredo (Australia) Mark Philippoussis (France) Arnaud Clément
12 Jan	Adidas International; Sydney, Australia; International Series $380,000 – hard Singles – Doubles	(Sweden) Jonas Björkman (Australia) Todd Woodbridge; 7–6^{(7–3)}, 7–5	(United States) Bob Bryan (United States) Mike Bryan	(South Africa) Wayne Ferreira (Netherlands) Martin Verkerk	(Australia) Todd Reid (Spain) Tommy Robredo (Australia) Mark Philippoussis (France) Arnaud Clément
19 Jan; 26 Jan	Australian Open; Melbourne, Australia; Grand Slam $6,737,000 – hard Singles – Doubles – Mixed doubles	(Switzerland) Roger Federer; 7–6^{(7–3)}, 6–4, 6–2	(Russia) Marat Safin	(United States) Andre Agassi (Spain) Juan Carlos Ferrero	(United States) Andy Roddick (France) Sébastien Grosjean (Morocco) Hicham Arazi (Argentina) David Nalbandian
19 Jan; 26 Jan	Australian Open; Melbourne, Australia; Grand Slam $6,737,000 – hard Singles – Doubles – Mixed doubles	(France) Michaël Llodra (France) Fabrice Santoro; 7–6^{(7–4)}, 6–3	(United States) Bob Bryan (United States) Mike Bryan	(United States) Andre Agassi (Spain) Juan Carlos Ferrero	(United States) Andy Roddick (France) Sébastien Grosjean (Morocco) Hicham Arazi (Argentina) David Nalbandian
19 Jan; 26 Jan	Australian Open; Melbourne, Australia; Grand Slam $6,737,000 – hard Singles – Doubles – Mixed doubles	(Serbia and Montenegro) Nenad Zimonjić (Russia) Elena Bovina; 6–1, 7–6^{(7–3)}	(India) Leander Paes (United States) Martina Navratilova	(United States) Andre Agassi (Spain) Juan Carlos Ferrero	(United States) Andy Roddick (France) Sébastien Grosjean (Morocco) Hicham Arazi (Argentina) David Nalbandian

=== February ===
Week	Tournament	Champions	Runners-up	Semifinalists	Quarterfinalists
2 Feb	Davis Cup by BNP Paribas First Round; Adelaide, Australia – hard Uncasville, CT, United States – hard (i); Minsk, Belarus – carpet (i); Agadir, Morocco – hard (i); Bucharest, Romania – clay (i); Metz, France – clay (i); Maastricht, Netherlands – clay (i); Brno, Czech Republic – carpet (i)	First-round winners Sweden 4–1; United States 5–0; Belarus 3–2; Argentina 5–0; Switzerland 3–2; France 4–1; Netherlands 4–1; Spain 3–2	First-round losers Australia; Austria; Russia; Morocco; Romania; Croatia; Canada; Czech Republic		
9 Feb	Milan Indoor; Milan, Italy; International Series; Carpet (i) – $375,750 – 32S/16D; Singles – Doubles	(France) Antony Dupuis; 6–4, 6–7^{(12–14)}, 7–6^{(7–5)}	(Croatia) Mario Ančić	(Sweden) Thomas Johansson (France) Gregory Carraz	(Slovakia) Karol Kučera (Spain) Tommy Robredo (Russia) Mikhail Youzhny (Netherlands) Martin Verkerk
9 Feb	Milan Indoor; Milan, Italy; International Series; Carpet (i) – $375,750 – 32S/16D; Singles – Doubles	(United States) Jared Palmer (Czech Republic) Pavel Vízner; 6–4, 6–4	(Italy) Daniele Bracciali (Italy) Giorgio Galimberti	(Sweden) Thomas Johansson (France) Gregory Carraz	(Slovakia) Karol Kučera (Spain) Tommy Robredo (Russia) Mikhail Youzhny (Netherlands) Martin Verkerk
9 Feb	Siebel Open; San Jose, US; International Series $380,000 – hard (i); Singles – Doubles	(United States) Andy Roddick; 7–6^{(15–13)}, 6–4	(United States) Mardy Fish	(United States) Robert Kendrick (United States) Andre Agassi	(Sweden) Joachim Johansson (France) Cyril Saulnier (South Korea) Hyung-Taik Lee (United States) Jan-Michael Gambill
9 Feb	Siebel Open; San Jose, US; International Series $380,000 – hard (i); Singles – Doubles	(United States) James Blake (United States) Mardy Fish; 6–2, 7–5	(United States) Rick Leach (United States) Brian MacPhie	(United States) Robert Kendrick (United States) Andre Agassi	(Sweden) Joachim Johansson (France) Cyril Saulnier (South Korea) Hyung-Taik Lee (United States) Jan-Michael Gambill
9 Feb	Bell South Open; Viña del Mar, Chile; International Series $333,000 – clay Singles – Doubles	(Chile) Fernando González; 7–5, 6–4	(Brazil) Gustavo Kuerten	(Brazil) Flávio Saretta (Spain) David Sánchez	(Chile) Nicolás Massú (Argentina) Mariano Zabaleta (Argentina) Gastón Gaudio (Italy) Filippo Volandri
9 Feb	Bell South Open; Viña del Mar, Chile; International Series $333,000 – clay Singles – Doubles	(Argentina) Juan Ignacio Chela (Argentina) Gastón Gaudio; 7–6^{(7–2)}, 7–6^{(7–3)}	(Ecuador) Nicolás Lapentti (Argentina) Martín Rodríguez	(Brazil) Flávio Saretta (Spain) David Sánchez	(Chile) Nicolás Massú (Argentina) Mariano Zabaleta (Argentina) Gastón Gaudio (Italy) Filippo Volandri
16 Feb	Argentina Open; Buenos Aires, Argentina; International Series $380,000 – clay Singles – Doubles	(Argentina) Guillermo Coria; 6–4, 6–1	(Spain) Carlos Moyà	(France) Richard Gasquet (Argentina) José Acasuso	(Argentina) Juan Mónaco (Chile) Nicolás Massú (Spain) David Ferrer (Argentina) Mariano Zabaleta
16 Feb	Argentina Open; Buenos Aires, Argentina; International Series $380,000 – clay Singles – Doubles	(Argentina) Lucas Arnold Ker (Argentina) Mariano Hood; 7–5, 6–7^{(2–7)}, 6–4	(Argentina) Federico Browne (Argentina) Diego Veronelli	(France) Richard Gasquet (Argentina) José Acasuso	(Argentina) Juan Mónaco (Chile) Nicolás Massú (Spain) David Ferrer (Argentina) Mariano Zabaleta
16 Feb	Kroger St. Jude; Memphis, US; International Series Gold $690,000 – hard (i)	(Sweden) Joachim Johansson; 7–6^{(7–5)}, 6–3	(Germany) Nicolas Kiefer	(Sweden) Thomas Enqvist (United States) Mardy Fish	(United States) Andy Roddick (United States) Jan-Michael Gambill (Belgium) Xavier Malisse (Russia) Dmitry Tursunov
16 Feb	Kroger St. Jude; Memphis, US; International Series Gold $690,000 – hard (i)	(United States) Bob Bryan (United States) Mike Bryan; 6–3, 6–4	(South Africa) Jeff Coetzee (South Africa) Chris Haggard	(Sweden) Thomas Enqvist (United States) Mardy Fish	(United States) Andy Roddick (United States) Jan-Michael Gambill (Belgium) Xavier Malisse (Russia) Dmitry Tursunov
16 Feb	ABN AMRO World Tennis Tournament; Rotterdam, Netherlands; International Series Gold $842,000 – hard (i); Singles – Doubles	(Australia) Lleyton Hewitt; 6–7^{(1–7)}, 7–5, 6–4	(Spain) Juan Carlos Ferrero	(United Kingdom) Tim Henman (Belarus) Max Mirnyi	(Switzerland) Roger Federer (Germany) Rainer Schüttler (Finland) Jarkko Nieminen (Netherlands) Raemon Sluiter
16 Feb	ABN AMRO World Tennis Tournament; Rotterdam, Netherlands; International Series Gold $842,000 – hard (i); Singles – Doubles	(Australia) Paul Hanley (Czech Republic) Radek Štěpánek; 5–7, 7–6^{(7–5)}, 7–5	(Israel) Jonathan Erlich (Israel) Andy Ram	(United Kingdom) Tim Henman (Belarus) Max Mirnyi	(Switzerland) Roger Federer (Germany) Rainer Schüttler (Finland) Jarkko Nieminen (Netherlands) Raemon Sluiter
23 Feb	Brasil Open; Costa do Sauipe, Brazil; International Series $380,000 – clay Singles – Doubles	(Brazil) Gustavo Kuerten; 3–6, 6–2, 6–3	(Argentina) Agustín Calleri	(Argentina) José Acasuso (Peru) Luis Horna	(Germany) Tomas Behrend (Argentina) Franco Squillari (Argentina) Juan Ignacio Chela (Spain) Galo Blanco
23 Feb	Brasil Open; Costa do Sauipe, Brazil; International Series $380,000 – clay Singles – Doubles	(Poland) Mariusz Fyrstenberg (Poland) Marcin Matkowski; 6–2, 6–2	(Germany) Tomas Behrend (Czech Republic) Leoš Friedl	(Argentina) José Acasuso (Peru) Luis Horna	(Germany) Tomas Behrend (Argentina) Franco Squillari (Argentina) Juan Ignacio Chela (Spain) Galo Blanco
23 Feb	Open 13; Marseille, France; International Series $593,750 – hard (i); Singles – Doubles	(Slovakia) Dominik Hrbatý; 4–6, 6–4, 6–4	(Sweden) Robin Söderling	(France) Arnaud Clément (Sweden) Jonas Björkman	(Chile) Fernando González (Spain) Alberto Martín (Belarus) Max Mirnyi (Switzerland) Marc Rosset
23 Feb	Open 13; Marseille, France; International Series $593,750 – hard (i); Singles – Doubles	(The Bahamas) Mark Knowles (Canada) Daniel Nestor; 7–5, 6–3	(Czech Republic) Martin Damm (Czech Republic) Cyril Suk	(France) Arnaud Clément (Sweden) Jonas Björkman	(Chile) Fernando González (Spain) Alberto Martín (Belarus) Max Mirnyi (Switzerland) Marc Rosset

=== March ===
Week	Tournament	Champions	Runners-up	Semifinalists	Quarterfinalists
1 Mar	Abierto Mexicano; Acapulco, Mexico; International Series Gold $627,000 – clay Singles – Doubles	(Spain) Carlos Moyà; 6–3, 6–0	(Spain) Fernando Verdasco	(Argentina) Juan Ignacio Chela (Argentina) Guillermo Cañas	(Italy) Filippo Volandri (Spain) Óscar Hernández (Spain) Rubén Ramírez Hidalgo (Chile) Nicolás Massú
1 Mar	Abierto Mexicano; Acapulco, Mexico; International Series Gold $627,000 – clay Singles – Doubles	(United States) Bob Bryan (United States) Mike Bryan; 6–2, 6–3	(Argentina) Juan Ignacio Chela (Chile) Nicolás Massú	(Argentina) Juan Ignacio Chela (Argentina) Guillermo Cañas	(Italy) Filippo Volandri (Spain) Óscar Hernández (Spain) Rubén Ramírez Hidalgo (Chile) Nicolás Massú
1 Mar	Dubai Open; Dubai, United Arab Emirates; International Series Gold $1,000,000 – hard Singles – Doubles	(Switzerland) Roger Federer; 4–6, 6–1, 6–2	(Spain) Feliciano López	(Finland) Jarkko Nieminen (Russia) Mikhail Youzhny	(Romania) Andrei Pavel (Netherlands) Sjeng Schalken (Croatia) Ivan Ljubičić (Spain) Rafael Nadal
1 Mar	Dubai Open; Dubai, United Arab Emirates; International Series Gold $1,000,000 – hard Singles – Doubles	(India) Mahesh Bhupathi (France) Fabrice Santoro; 6–2, 4–6, 6–4	(Sweden) Jonas Björkman (India) Leander Paes	(Finland) Jarkko Nieminen (Russia) Mikhail Youzhny	(Romania) Andrei Pavel (Netherlands) Sjeng Schalken (Croatia) Ivan Ljubičić (Spain) Rafael Nadal
1 Mar	Franklin Templeton Tennis Classic; Scottsdale, US; International Series $380,000 – hard Singles – Doubles	(United States) Vincent Spadea; 7–5, 6–7^{(5–7)}, 6–3	(Germany) Nicolas Kiefer	(United States) Andy Roddick (Romania) Victor Hănescu	(United States) Jan-Michael Gambill (United States) James Blake (United States) Robby Ginepri (Netherlands) Martin Verkerk
1 Mar	Franklin Templeton Tennis Classic; Scottsdale, US; International Series $380,000 – hard Singles – Doubles	(United States) Rick Leach (United States) Brian MacPhie; 6–3, 6–1	(South Africa) Jeff Coetzee (South Africa) Chris Haggard	(United States) Andy Roddick (Romania) Victor Hănescu	(United States) Jan-Michael Gambill (United States) James Blake (United States) Robby Ginepri (Netherlands) Martin Verkerk
8 Mar; 15 Mar	Indian Wells Masters; Indian Wells, US; Masters Series $2,529,000 – hard Singles – Doubles	(Switzerland) Roger Federer; 6–3, 6–3	(United Kingdom) Tim Henman	(United States) Andre Agassi (Georgia (country)) Irakli Labadze	(Argentina) Juan Ignacio Chela (Argentina) Guillermo Coria (United States) Andy Roddick (United States) James Blake
8 Mar; 15 Mar	Indian Wells Masters; Indian Wells, US; Masters Series $2,529,000 – hard Singles – Doubles	(France) Arnaud Clément (France) Sébastien Grosjean; 6–3, 4–6, 7–5	(Zimbabwe) Wayne Black (Zimbabwe) Kevin Ullyett	(United States) Andre Agassi (Georgia (country)) Irakli Labadze	(Argentina) Juan Ignacio Chela (Argentina) Guillermo Coria (United States) Andy Roddick (United States) James Blake
22 Mar; 29 Mar	Miami Masters; Miami, US; Masters Series $2,950,000 – hard Singles – Doubles	(United States) Andy Roddick; 6–7^{(2–7)}, 6–3, 6–1 ret.	(Argentina) Guillermo Coria	(Chile) Fernando González (United States) Vincent Spadea	(Romania) Andrei Pavel (Germany) Nicolas Kiefer (Argentina) Agustín Calleri (Spain) Carlos Moyà
22 Mar; 29 Mar	Miami Masters; Miami, US; Masters Series $2,950,000 – hard Singles – Doubles	(Zimbabwe) Wayne Black (Zimbabwe) Kevin Ullyett; 6–2, 7–6^{(14–12)}	(Sweden) Jonas Björkman (Australia) Todd Woodbridge	(Chile) Fernando González (United States) Vincent Spadea	(Romania) Andrei Pavel (Germany) Nicolas Kiefer (Argentina) Agustín Calleri (Spain) Carlos Moyà

=== April ===
Week	Tournament	Champions	Runners-up	Semifinalists	Quarterfinalists
5 Apr	Davis Cup by BNP Paribas Quarterfinals; Delray Beach, Florida, USA – hard Minsk, Belarus – carpet (i); Prilly, Switzerland – hard (i); Palma de Mallorca, Spain – clay	Quarterfinal winners United States 4–1; Belarus 5–0; France 3–2; Spain 4–1	Quarterfinal losers Sweden; Argentina; Switzerland; Netherlands		
12 Apr	Estoril Open; Oeiras, Portugal; International Series $519,750 – clay Singles – Doubles	(Argentina) Juan Ignacio Chela; 6–7(2), 6–3, 6–3	(Russia) Marat Safin	(Germany) Florian Mayer (Georgia (country)) Irakli Labadze	(Romania) Victor Hănescu (France) Olivier Patience (Spain) Tommy Robredo (Spain) Rafael Nadal
12 Apr	Estoril Open; Oeiras, Portugal; International Series $519,750 – clay Singles – Doubles	(Argentina) Juan Ignacio Chela (Argentina) Gastón Gaudio; 6–2, 6–1	(Czech Republic) František Čermák (Czech Republic) Leoš Friedl	(Germany) Florian Mayer (Georgia (country)) Irakli Labadze	(Romania) Victor Hănescu (France) Olivier Patience (Spain) Tommy Robredo (Spain) Rafael Nadal
12 Apr	U.S. Men's Clay Court Championships; Houston, US; International Series $400,000 – clay Singles – Doubles	(Germany) Tommy Haas; 6–3, 6–4	(United States) Andy Roddick	(Peru) Luis Horna (Romania) Andrei Pavel	(Austria) Jürgen Melzer (United States) Todd Martin (United States) James Blake (Russia) Dmitry Tursunov
12 Apr	U.S. Men's Clay Court Championships; Houston, US; International Series $400,000 – clay Singles – Doubles	(United States) James Blake (United States) Mardy Fish; 6–3, 6–4	(United States) Rick Leach (United States) Brian MacPhie	(Peru) Luis Horna (Romania) Andrei Pavel	(Austria) Jürgen Melzer (United States) Todd Martin (United States) James Blake (Russia) Dmitry Tursunov
12 Apr	Open de Tenis Comunidad Valenciana; Valencia, Spain; International Series $395,750 – clay Singles – Doubles	(Spain) Fernando Verdasco; 7–6(5), 6–3	(Spain) Albert Montañés	(Spain) Juan Carlos Ferrero (Spain) Alberto Martín	(Croatia) Mario Ančić (Spain) David Ferrer (Belgium) Christophe Rochus (Spain) Marc López
12 Apr	Open de Tenis Comunidad Valenciana; Valencia, Spain; International Series $395,750 – clay Singles – Doubles	(Argentina) Gastón Etlis (Argentina) Martín Rodríguez; 7–5, 7–6(5)	(Spain) Feliciano López (Spain) Marc López	(Spain) Juan Carlos Ferrero (Spain) Alberto Martín	(Croatia) Mario Ančić (Spain) David Ferrer (Belgium) Christophe Rochus (Spain) Marc López
19 Apr	Monte Carlo Masters; Roquebrune-Cap-Martin, France; Masters Series $2,175,500 – clay Singles – Doubles	(Argentina) Guillermo Coria; 6–2, 6–1, 6–3	(Germany) Rainer Schüttler	(Russia) Marat Safin (Spain) Carlos Moyà	(Spain) Alberto Martín (Argentina) David Nalbandian (United Kingdom) Tim Henman (Russia) Nikolay Davydenko
19 Apr	Monte Carlo Masters; Roquebrune-Cap-Martin, France; Masters Series $2,175,500 – clay Singles – Doubles	(United Kingdom) Tim Henman (Serbia and Montenegro) Nenad Zimonjić; 7–5, 6–2	(Argentina) Gastón Etlis (Argentina) Martín Rodríguez	(Russia) Marat Safin (Spain) Carlos Moyà	(Spain) Alberto Martín (Argentina) David Nalbandian (United Kingdom) Tim Henman (Russia) Nikolay Davydenko
26 Apr	Torneo Godó; Barcelona, Spain; International Series Gold $990,000 – clay Singles – Doubles	(Spain) Tommy Robredo; 6–3, 4–6, 6–2, 3–6, 6–3	(Argentina) Gastón Gaudio	(Belgium) Kristof Vliegen (Spain) Albert Montañés	(Chile) Fernando González (Argentina) David Nalbandian (Argentina) Agustín Calleri (Brazil) Gustavo Kuerten
26 Apr	Torneo Godó; Barcelona, Spain; International Series Gold $990,000 – clay Singles – Doubles	(The Bahamas) Mark Knowles (Canada) Daniel Nestor; 4–6, 6–3, 6–4	(Argentina) Mariano Hood (Argentina) Sebastián Prieto	(Belgium) Kristof Vliegen (Spain) Albert Montañés	(Chile) Fernando González (Argentina) David Nalbandian (Argentina) Agustín Calleri (Brazil) Gustavo Kuerten
26 Apr	BMW Open; Munich, Germany; International Series $375,750 – clay Singles – Doubles	(Russia) Nikolay Davydenko; 6–4, 7–5	(Netherlands) Martin Verkerk	(Peru) Luis Horna (Belgium) Olivier Rochus	(Germany) Rainer Schüttler (Czech Republic) Radek Štěpánek (Switzerland) Michel Kratochvil (Germany) Alexander Waske
26 Apr	BMW Open; Munich, Germany; International Series $375,750 – clay Singles – Doubles	(United States) James Blake (The Bahamas) Mark Merklein; 6–2, 6–4	(Austria) Julian Knowle (Serbia and Montenegro) Nenad Zimonjić	(Peru) Luis Horna (Belgium) Olivier Rochus	(Germany) Rainer Schüttler (Czech Republic) Radek Štěpánek (Switzerland) Michel Kratochvil (Germany) Alexander Waske

=== May ===
Week	Tournament	Champions	Runners-up	Semifinalists	Quarterfinalists
3 May	Telecom Italia Masters; Rome, Italy; Masters Series $2,175,500 – clay Singles – Doubles	(Spain) Carlos Moyà; 6–3, 6–3, 6–1	(Argentina) David Nalbandian	(Spain) Albert Costa (Argentina) Mariano Zabaleta	(Czech Republic) Jiří Novák (United States) Vincent Spadea (Chile) Nicolás Massú (Romania) Andrei Pavel
3 May	Telecom Italia Masters; Rome, Italy; Masters Series $2,175,500 – clay Singles – Doubles	(India) Mahesh Bhupathi (Belarus) Max Mirnyi; 2–6, 6–3, 6–4	(Australia) Wayne Arthurs (Australia) Paul Hanley	(Spain) Albert Costa (Argentina) Mariano Zabaleta	(Czech Republic) Jiří Novák (United States) Vincent Spadea (Chile) Nicolás Massú (Romania) Andrei Pavel
10 May	Hamburg Masters; Hamburg, Germany; Masters Series $2,175,500 – clay Singles – Doubles	(Switzerland) Roger Federer; 4–6, 6–4, 6–2, 6–3	(Argentina) Guillermo Coria	(Australia) Lleyton Hewitt (Croatia) Ivan Ljubičić	(Spain) Carlos Moyà (Austria) Jürgen Melzer (Russia) Mikhail Youzhny (Spain) David Ferrer
10 May	Hamburg Masters; Hamburg, Germany; Masters Series $2,175,500 – clay Singles – Doubles	(Zimbabwe) Wayne Black (Zimbabwe) Kevin Ullyett; 6–4, 6–2	(United States) Bob Bryan (United States) Mike Bryan	(Australia) Lleyton Hewitt (Croatia) Ivan Ljubičić	(Spain) Carlos Moyà (Austria) Jürgen Melzer (Russia) Mikhail Youzhny (Spain) David Ferrer
17 May	World Team Cup; Düsseldorf, Germany; World Team Cup $2,100,000 – clay	Chile; 2–1	Australia	Germany; Argentina	Czech Republic; Spain; United States; Netherlands
17 May	Grand Prix Hassan II; Casablanca, Morocco; International Series $351,000 – clay Singles – Doubles	(Spain) Santiago Ventura; 6–3, 1–6, 6–4	(Slovakia) Dominik Hrbatý	(France) Julien Benneteau (Belgium) Christophe Rochus	(Spain) Óscar Hernández (France) Thierry Ascione (France) Antony Dupuis (Switzerland) Ivo Heuberger
17 May	Grand Prix Hassan II; Casablanca, Morocco; International Series $351,000 – clay Singles – Doubles	(Italy) Enzo Artoni (Spain) Fernando Vicente; 3–6, 6–0, 6–4	(Switzerland) Yves Allegro (Germany) Michael Kohlmann	(France) Julien Benneteau (Belgium) Christophe Rochus	(Spain) Óscar Hernández (France) Thierry Ascione (France) Antony Dupuis (Switzerland) Ivo Heuberger
17 May	Internationaler Raiffeisen Grand Prix; St. Poelten, Austria; International Series $375,750 – clay	(Italy) Filippo Volandri; 6–1, 6–4	(Belgium) Xavier Malisse	(Spain) David Sánchez (Austria) Jürgen Melzer	(Romania) Victor Hănescu (Russia) Nikolay Davydenko (Belgium) Olivier Rochus (Austria) Daniel Köllerer
17 May	Internationaler Raiffeisen Grand Prix; St. Poelten, Austria; International Series $375,750 – clay	(Argentina) Mariano Hood (Czech Republic) Petr Pála; 3–6, 7–5, 6–4	(Czech Republic) Tomáš Cibulec (Czech Republic) Leoš Friedl	(Spain) David Sánchez (Austria) Jürgen Melzer	(Romania) Victor Hănescu (Russia) Nikolay Davydenko (Belgium) Olivier Rochus (Austria) Daniel Köllerer
24 May; 31 May	French Open; Paris, France; Grand Slam $7,462,318 – clay Singles – Doubles – Mixed doubles	(Argentina) Gastón Gaudio; 0–6, 3–6, 6–4, 6–1, 8–6	(Argentina) Guillermo Coria	(Argentina) David Nalbandian (United Kingdom) Tim Henman	(Brazil) Gustavo Kuerten (Australia) Lleyton Hewitt (Spain) Carlos Moyà (Argentina) Juan Ignacio Chela
24 May; 31 May	French Open; Paris, France; Grand Slam $7,462,318 – clay Singles – Doubles – Mixed doubles	(Belgium) Xavier Malisse (Belgium) Olivier Rochus; 7–5, 7–5	(France) Michaël Llodra (France) Fabrice Santoro	(Argentina) David Nalbandian (United Kingdom) Tim Henman	(Brazil) Gustavo Kuerten (Australia) Lleyton Hewitt (Spain) Carlos Moyà (Argentina) Juan Ignacio Chela
24 May; 31 May	French Open; Paris, France; Grand Slam $7,462,318 – clay Singles – Doubles – Mixed doubles	(France) Richard Gasquet (France) Tatiana Golovin; 6–3, 6–4	(Zimbabwe) Wayne Black (Zimbabwe) Cara Black	(Argentina) David Nalbandian (United Kingdom) Tim Henman	(Brazil) Gustavo Kuerten (Australia) Lleyton Hewitt (Spain) Carlos Moyà (Argentina) Juan Ignacio Chela

=== June ===
Week	Tournament	Champions	Runners-up	Semifinalists	Quarterfinalists
7 Jun	Gerry Weber Open; Halle, Germany; International Series $791,750 – grass Singles – Doubles	(Switzerland) Roger Federer; 6–0, 6–3	(United States) Mardy Fish	(Czech Republic) Jiří Novák (Germany) Rainer Schüttler	(France) Arnaud Clément (Germany) Tommy Haas (Spain) Fernando Verdasco (Germany) Nicolas Kiefer
7 Jun	Gerry Weber Open; Halle, Germany; International Series $791,750 – grass Singles – Doubles	(India) Leander Paes (Czech Republic) David Rikl; 6–2, 7–5	(Czech Republic) Tomáš Cibulec (Czech Republic) Petr Pála	(Czech Republic) Jiří Novák (Germany) Rainer Schüttler	(France) Arnaud Clément (Germany) Tommy Haas (Spain) Fernando Verdasco (Germany) Nicolas Kiefer
7 Jun	Stella Artois Championships; London, UK; International Series $761,750 – grass Singles – Doubles	(United States) Andy Roddick; 7–6^{(7–4)}, 6–4	(France) Sébastien Grosjean	(Australia) Lleyton Hewitt (South Korea) Hyung-Taik Lee	(Thailand) Paradorn Srichaphan (Russia) Igor Andreev (Slovakia) Karol Beck (Czech Republic) Radek Štěpánek
7 Jun	Stella Artois Championships; London, UK; International Series $761,750 – grass Singles – Doubles	(United States) Bob Bryan (United States) Mike Bryan; 6–4, 6–4	(The Bahamas) Mark Knowles (Canada) Daniel Nestor	(Australia) Lleyton Hewitt (South Korea) Hyung-Taik Lee	(Thailand) Paradorn Srichaphan (Russia) Igor Andreev (Slovakia) Karol Beck (Czech Republic) Radek Štěpánek
14 Jun	Ordina Open 's-Hertogenbosch, Netherlands; International Series $375,750 – grass Singles – Doubles	(France) Michaël Llodra; 6–3, 6–4	(Argentina) Guillermo Coria	(Croatia) Mario Ančić (Spain) Tommy Robredo	(France) Arnaud Clément (Netherlands) Martin Verkerk (Spain) Fernando Verdasco (Netherlands) Raemon Sluiter
14 Jun	Ordina Open 's-Hertogenbosch, Netherlands; International Series $375,750 – grass Singles – Doubles	(Czech Republic) Martin Damm (Czech Republic) Cyril Suk; 6–3, 6–7^{(5–7)}, 6–3	(Germany) Lars Burgsmüller (Czech Republic) Jan Vacek	(Croatia) Mario Ančić (Spain) Tommy Robredo	(France) Arnaud Clément (Netherlands) Martin Verkerk (Spain) Fernando Verdasco (Netherlands) Raemon Sluiter
14 Jun	Nottingham Open; Nottingham, UK; International Series $375,750 – grass Singles – Doubles	(Thailand) Paradorn Srichaphan; 1–6, 7–6^{(7–4)}, 6–3	(Sweden) Thomas Johansson	(Sweden) Robin Söderling (United States) Taylor Dent	(Morocco) Hicham Arazi (Brazil) Flávio Saretta (United Kingdom) Greg Rusedski (Romania) Victor Hănescu
14 Jun	Nottingham Open; Nottingham, UK; International Series $375,750 – grass Singles – Doubles	(Australia) Paul Hanley (Australia) Todd Woodbridge; 6–4, 6–3	(United States) Rick Leach (United States) Brian MacPhie	(Sweden) Robin Söderling (United States) Taylor Dent	(Morocco) Hicham Arazi (Brazil) Flávio Saretta (United Kingdom) Greg Rusedski (Romania) Victor Hănescu
21 Jun; 28 Jun	Wimbledon Championships; London, UK; Grand Slam $8,328,704 – grass Singles – Doubles – Mixed doubles	(Switzerland) Roger Federer; 4–6, 7–5, 7–6^{(7–3)}, 6–4	(United States) Andy Roddick	(France) Sébastien Grosjean (Croatia) Mario Ančić	(Australia) Lleyton Hewitt (Germany) Florian Mayer (United Kingdom) Tim Henman (Netherlands) Sjeng Schalken
21 Jun; 28 Jun	Wimbledon Championships; London, UK; Grand Slam $8,328,704 – grass Singles – Doubles – Mixed doubles	(Sweden) Jonas Björkman (Australia) Todd Woodbridge; 6–1, 6–4, 4–6, 6–4	(Austria) Julian Knowle (Serbia and Montenegro) Nenad Zimonjić	(France) Sébastien Grosjean (Croatia) Mario Ančić	(Australia) Lleyton Hewitt (Germany) Florian Mayer (United Kingdom) Tim Henman (Netherlands) Sjeng Schalken
21 Jun; 28 Jun	Wimbledon Championships; London, UK; Grand Slam $8,328,704 – grass Singles – Doubles – Mixed doubles	(Zimbabwe) Wayne Black (Zimbabwe) Cara Black; 3–6, 7–6^{(10–8)}, 6–4	(Australia) Todd Woodbridge (Australia) Alicia Molik	(France) Sébastien Grosjean (Croatia) Mario Ančić	(Australia) Lleyton Hewitt (Germany) Florian Mayer (United Kingdom) Tim Henman (Netherlands) Sjeng Schalken

=== July ===
Week	Tournament	Champions	Runners-up	Semifinalists	Quarterfinalists
5 Jul	Swedish Open; Båstad, Sweden; International Series; Clay – $375,750 – 32S/16D	(Argentina) Mariano Zabaleta; 6–1, 4–6, 7–6^{(7–4)}	(Argentina) Gastón Gaudio	(Chile) Fernando González (Sweden) Robin Söderling	(Spain) Alberto Martín (Argentina) Juan Mónaco (Argentina) Juan Ignacio Chela (Spain) Rafael Nadal
5 Jul	Swedish Open; Båstad, Sweden; International Series; Clay – $375,750 – 32S/16D	(India) Mahesh Bhupathi (Sweden) Jonas Björkman; 4–6, 7–6^{(7–2)}, 7–6^{(8–6)}	(Sweden) Simon Aspelin (Australia) Todd Perry	(Chile) Fernando González (Sweden) Robin Söderling	(Spain) Alberto Martín (Argentina) Juan Mónaco (Argentina) Juan Ignacio Chela (Spain) Rafael Nadal
5 Jul	Allianz Suisse Open; Gstaad, Switzerland; International Series; Clay – $544,750 – 32S/16D; Singles – Doubles	(Switzerland) Roger Federer; 6–2, 6–3, 5–7, 6–3	(Russia) Igor Andreev	(Italy) Potito Starace (Germany) Rainer Schüttler	(Czech Republic) Radek Štěpánek (Czech Republic) Jiří Novák (Spain) Félix Mantilla (Spain) Rubén Ramírez Hidalgo
5 Jul	Allianz Suisse Open; Gstaad, Switzerland; International Series; Clay – $544,750 – 32S/16D; Singles – Doubles	(India) Leander Paes (Czech Republic) David Rikl; 6–4, 6–2	(Switzerland) Marc Rosset (Switzerland) Stanislas Wawrinka	(Italy) Potito Starace (Germany) Rainer Schüttler	(Czech Republic) Radek Štěpánek (Czech Republic) Jiří Novák (Spain) Félix Mantilla (Spain) Rubén Ramírez Hidalgo
5 Jul	Hall of Fame Tennis Championships; Newport, US; International Series; Grass – $380,000 – 32S/16D; Singles – Doubles	(United Kingdom) Greg Rusedski; 7–6^{(7–5)}, 7–6^{(8–2)}	(Germany) Alexander Popp	(France) Cyril Saulnier (France) Antony Dupuis	(United States) Vincent Spadea (Austria) Jürgen Melzer (United States) Jeff Morrison (United States) Alex Bogomolov Jr.
5 Jul	Hall of Fame Tennis Championships; Newport, US; International Series; Grass – $380,000 – 32S/16D; Singles – Doubles	(Australia) Jordan Kerr (United States) Jim Thomas; 6–3, 6–7^{(5–7)}, 6–3	(France) Gregory Carraz (France) Nicolas Mahut	(France) Cyril Saulnier (France) Antony Dupuis	(United States) Vincent Spadea (Austria) Jürgen Melzer (United States) Jeff Morrison (United States) Alex Bogomolov Jr.
12 Jul	Dutch Open; Amersfoort, Netherlands; International Series; Clay – $375,750; Singles – Doubles	(Netherlands) Martin Verkerk; 7–6^{(7–5)}, 4–6, 6–4	(Chile) Fernando González	(Chile) Nicolás Massú (Netherlands) Dennis van Scheppingen	(Germany) Tomas Behrend (Spain) David Sánchez (Spain) Alberto Martín (Russia) Igor Andreev
12 Jul	Dutch Open; Amersfoort, Netherlands; International Series; Clay – $375,750; Singles – Doubles	(Czech Republic) Jaroslav Levinský (Czech Republic) David Škoch; 6–0, 2–6, 7–5	(Argentina) José Acasuso (Peru) Luis Horna	(Chile) Nicolás Massú (Netherlands) Dennis van Scheppingen	(Germany) Tomas Behrend (Spain) David Sánchez (Spain) Alberto Martín (Russia) Igor Andreev
12 Jul	Mercedes Benz Cup; Los Angeles, US; International Series; Hard – $380,000; Singles – Doubles	(Germany) Tommy Haas; 7–6^{(8–6)}, 6–4	(Germany) Nicolas Kiefer	(France) Cyril Saulnier (United States) Jeff Morrison	(United States) Andre Agassi (United States) Mardy Fish (United Kingdom) Greg Rusedski (South Africa) Wesley Moodie
12 Jul	Mercedes Benz Cup; Los Angeles, US; International Series; Hard – $380,000; Singles – Doubles	(United States) Bob Bryan (United States) Mike Bryan; 6–3, 7–6^{(8–6)}	(Australia) Wayne Arthurs (Australia) Paul Hanley	(France) Cyril Saulnier (United States) Jeff Morrison	(United States) Andre Agassi (United States) Mardy Fish (United Kingdom) Greg Rusedski (South Africa) Wesley Moodie
12 Jul	Mercedes Cup; Stuttgart, Germany; International Series Gold; Clay – $614,750	(Argentina) Guillermo Cañas; 5–7, 6–2, 6–0, 1–6, 6–3	(Argentina) Gastón Gaudio	(Russia) Nikolay Davydenko (Spain) David Ferrer	(Czech Republic) Radek Štěpánek (Spain) Albert Costa (Spain) Rafael Nadal (Czech Republic) Jiří Novák
12 Jul	Mercedes Cup; Stuttgart, Germany; International Series Gold; Clay – $614,750	(Czech Republic) Jiří Novák (Czech Republic) Radek Štěpánek; 6–2, 6–4	(Sweden) Simon Aspelin (Australia) Todd Perry	(Russia) Nikolay Davydenko (Spain) David Ferrer	(Czech Republic) Radek Štěpánek (Spain) Albert Costa (Spain) Rafael Nadal (Czech Republic) Jiří Novák
19 Jul	RCA Championships; Indianapolis, US; International Series; Hard – $600,000 – 48S/16D; Singles – Doubles	(United States) Andy Roddick; 6–2, 6–3	(Germany) Nicolas Kiefer	(Croatia) Ivan Ljubičić (France) Gregory Carraz	(Slovakia) Dominik Hrbatý (France) Sébastien Grosjean (Thailand) Paradorn Srichaphan (Israel) Noam Okun
19 Jul	RCA Championships; Indianapolis, US; International Series; Hard – $600,000 – 48S/16D; Singles – Doubles	(Australia) Jordan Kerr (United States) Jim Thomas; 6–7^{(7–9)}, 7–6^{(7–3)}, 6–3	(Zimbabwe) Wayne Black (Zimbabwe) Kevin Ullyett	(Croatia) Ivan Ljubičić (France) Gregory Carraz	(Slovakia) Dominik Hrbatý (France) Sébastien Grosjean (Thailand) Paradorn Srichaphan (Israel) Noam Okun
19 Jul	Generali Open; Kitzbühel, Austria; International Series Gold; Clay – $724,750 – 48S/16D	(Chile) Nicolás Massú; 7–6^{(7–3)}, 6–4	(Argentina) Gastón Gaudio	(Germany) Rainer Schüttler (Spain) Fernando Verdasco	(Germany) Florian Mayer (Argentina) Mariano Zabaleta (Spain) Feliciano López (Peru) Luis Horna
19 Jul	Generali Open; Kitzbühel, Austria; International Series Gold; Clay – $724,750 – 48S/16D	(Czech Republic) František Čermák (Czech Republic) Leoš Friedl; 6–3, 7–5	(Argentina) Lucas Arnold Ker (Argentina) Martín García	(Germany) Rainer Schüttler (Spain) Fernando Verdasco	(Germany) Florian Mayer (Argentina) Mariano Zabaleta (Spain) Feliciano López (Peru) Luis Horna
19 Jul	Croatia Open; Umag, Croatia; International Series; Clay – $395,750 – 32S/16D	(Argentina) Guillermo Cañas; 7–5, 6–3	(Italy) Filippo Volandri	(Spain) Carlos Moyà (Spain) Guillermo García-López	(Spain) Alberto Martín (Belgium) Kristof Vliegen (Spain) Álex Calatrava (Czech Republic) Jiří Novák
19 Jul	Croatia Open; Umag, Croatia; International Series; Clay – $395,750 – 32S/16D	(Argentina) José Acasuso (Brazil) Flávio Saretta; 4–6, 6–2, 6–4	(Czech Republic) Jaroslav Levinský (Czech Republic) David Škoch	(Spain) Carlos Moyà (Spain) Guillermo García-López	(Spain) Alberto Martín (Belgium) Kristof Vliegen (Spain) Álex Calatrava (Czech Republic) Jiří Novák
26 Jul	Canada Masters; Toronto, Canada; Masters Series; Hard – $2,257,000; Singles – Doubles	(Switzerland) Roger Federer; 7–5, 6–3	(United States) Andy Roddick	(Sweden) Thomas Johansson (Germany) Nicolas Kiefer	(France) Fabrice Santoro (Sweden) Joachim Johansson (Austria) Jürgen Melzer (Czech Republic) Jan Hernych
26 Jul	Canada Masters; Toronto, Canada; Masters Series; Hard – $2,257,000; Singles – Doubles	(India) Mahesh Bhupathi (India) Leander Paes; 6–4, 6–2	(Sweden) Jonas Björkman (Belarus) Max Mirnyi	(Sweden) Thomas Johansson (Germany) Nicolas Kiefer	(France) Fabrice Santoro (Sweden) Joachim Johansson (Austria) Jürgen Melzer (Czech Republic) Jan Hernych

=== August ===
Week	Tournament	Champions	Runners-up	Semifinalists	Quarterfinalists
2 Aug	Cincinnati Masters; Mason, United States; Masters Series $2,200,000 – hard Singles – Doubles	(United States) Andre Agassi; 6–3, 3–6, 6–2	(Australia) Lleyton Hewitt	(Spain) Tommy Robredo (United States) Andy Roddick	(France) Fabrice Santoro (Russia) Marat Safin (Spain) Carlos Moyà (Germany) Tommy Haas
2 Aug	Cincinnati Masters; Mason, United States; Masters Series $2,200,000 – hard Singles – Doubles	(The Bahamas) Mark Knowles (Canada) Daniel Nestor; 6–2, 3–6, 6–3	(Sweden) Jonas Björkman (Australia) Todd Woodbridge	(Spain) Tommy Robredo (United States) Andy Roddick	(France) Fabrice Santoro (Russia) Marat Safin (Spain) Carlos Moyà (Germany) Tommy Haas
9 Aug	Idea Prokom Open; Sopot, Poland; International Series $494,750 – clay Singles – Doubles	(Spain) Rafael Nadal; 6–3, 6–4	(Argentina) José Acasuso	(Argentina) Juan Mónaco (Spain) Félix Mantilla	(Spain) Marc López (Czech Republic) Jiří Vaněk (Argentina) Franco Squillari (Chile) Adrián García
9 Aug	Idea Prokom Open; Sopot, Poland; International Series $494,750 – clay Singles – Doubles	(Czech Republic) František Čermák (Czech Republic) Leoš Friedl; 2–6, 6–2, 6–3	(Argentina) Martín García (Argentina) Sebastián Prieto	(Argentina) Juan Mónaco (Spain) Félix Mantilla	(Spain) Marc López (Czech Republic) Jiří Vaněk (Argentina) Franco Squillari (Chile) Adrián García
16 Aug	Summer Olympics; Athens, Greece; Olympic Games hard Singles – Doubles	Gold	Silver	Bronze	Quarterfinalists
16 Aug	Summer Olympics; Athens, Greece; Olympic Games hard Singles – Doubles	(Chile) Nicolás Massú; 6–3, 3–6, 2–6, 6–3, 6–4	(United States) Mardy Fish	(Chile) Fernando González; 6–4, 2–6, 16–14 Fourth place (United States) Taylor Dent	(Czech Republic) Tomáš Berdych (Spain) Carlos Moyà (Russia) Mikhail Youzhny (France) Sébastien Grosjean
16 Aug	Summer Olympics; Athens, Greece; Olympic Games hard Singles – Doubles	(Chile) Fernando González; Nicolás Massú; 6–2, 4–6, 3–6, 7–6^{(9–7)}, 6–4	(Germany) Nicolas Kiefer; Rainer Schüttler	(Chile) Fernando González; 6–4, 2–6, 16–14 Fourth place (United States) Taylor Dent	(Czech Republic) Tomáš Berdych (Spain) Carlos Moyà (Russia) Mikhail Youzhny (France) Sébastien Grosjean
16 Aug	Legg Mason Tennis Classic; Washington, D. C., United States; International Series $500,000 – hard Singles – Doubles	(Australia) Lleyton Hewitt; 6–3, 6–4	(Luxembourg) Gilles Müller	(United States) Andre Agassi (United States) Robby Ginepri	(France) Paul-Henri Mathieu (Switzerland) Michel Kratochvil (Netherlands) Raemon Sluiter (France) Cyril Saulnier
16 Aug	Legg Mason Tennis Classic; Washington, D. C., United States; International Series $500,000 – hard Singles – Doubles	(South Africa) Chris Haggard (South Africa) Robbie Koenig; 7–6^{(7–3)}, 6–1	(United States) Travis Parrott (Russia) Dmitry Tursunov	(United States) Andre Agassi (United States) Robby Ginepri	(France) Paul-Henri Mathieu (Switzerland) Michel Kratochvil (Netherlands) Raemon Sluiter (France) Cyril Saulnier
23 Aug	TD Waterhouse Cup; Long Island, United States; International Series $380,000 – hard	(Australia) Lleyton Hewitt; 6–3, 6–1	(Peru) Luis Horna	(Thailand) Paradorn Srichaphan (Russia) Dmitry Tursunov	(Russia) Nikolay Davydenko (Sweden) Joachim Johansson (Austria) Jürgen Melzer (Argentina) Juan Ignacio Chela
23 Aug	TD Waterhouse Cup; Long Island, United States; International Series $380,000 – hard	(France) Antony Dupuis (France) Michaël Llodra; 6–2, 6–4	(Switzerland) Yves Allegro (Germany) Michael Kohlmann	(Thailand) Paradorn Srichaphan (Russia) Dmitry Tursunov	(Russia) Nikolay Davydenko (Sweden) Joachim Johansson (Austria) Jürgen Melzer (Argentina) Juan Ignacio Chela
30 Aug; 6 Sep	US Open; Flushing, New York, United States; Grand Slam $7,696,000 – hard Singles – Doubles; Mixed doubles	(Switzerland) Roger Federer; 6–0, 7–6^{(7–3)}, 6–0	(Australia) Lleyton Hewitt	(United Kingdom) Tim Henman (Sweden) Joachim Johansson	(United States) Andre Agassi (Slovakia) Dominik Hrbatý (Germany) Tommy Haas (United States) Andy Roddick
30 Aug; 6 Sep	US Open; Flushing, New York, United States; Grand Slam $7,696,000 – hard Singles – Doubles; Mixed doubles	(The Bahamas) Mark Knowles (Canada) Daniel Nestor; 6–3, 6–3	(India) Leander Paes (Czech Republic) David Rikl	(United Kingdom) Tim Henman (Sweden) Joachim Johansson	(United States) Andre Agassi (Slovakia) Dominik Hrbatý (Germany) Tommy Haas (United States) Andy Roddick
30 Aug; 6 Sep	US Open; Flushing, New York, United States; Grand Slam $7,696,000 – hard Singles – Doubles; Mixed doubles	(United States) Bob Bryan (Russia) Vera Zvonareva; 6–3, 6–4	(Australia) Todd Woodbridge (Australia) Alicia Molik	(United Kingdom) Tim Henman (Sweden) Joachim Johansson	(United States) Andre Agassi (Slovakia) Dominik Hrbatý (Germany) Tommy Haas (United States) Andy Roddick

=== September ===
Week	Tournament	Champions	Runners-up	Semifinalists	Quarterfinalists
13 Sep	China Open; Beijing, China; International Series $500,000 – hard Singles – Doubles	(Russia) Marat Safin; 7–6^{(7–4)}, 7–5	(Russia) Mikhail Youzhny	(Thailand) Paradorn Srichaphan (Finland) Jarkko Nieminen	(South Korea) Hyung-Taik Lee (Slovakia) Dominik Hrbatý (Argentina) David Nalbandian (United States) Kevin Kim
13 Sep	China Open; Beijing, China; International Series $500,000 – hard Singles – Doubles	(United States) Justin Gimelstob (United States) Graydon Oliver; 4–6, 6–4, 7–6^{(8–6)}	(United States) Alex Bogomolov Jr. (United States) Taylor Dent	(Thailand) Paradorn Srichaphan (Finland) Jarkko Nieminen	(South Korea) Hyung-Taik Lee (Slovakia) Dominik Hrbatý (Argentina) David Nalbandian (United States) Kevin Kim
13 Sep	Romanian Open; Bucharest, Romania; International Series $375,000 – clay	(Argentina) José Acasuso; 6–3, 6–0	(Russia) Igor Andreev	(Italy) Filippo Volandri (Germany) Florian Mayer	(Romania) Victor Hănescu (France) Paul-Henri Mathieu (Spain) Félix Mantilla (Spain) David Ferrer
13 Sep	Romanian Open; Bucharest, Romania; International Series $375,000 – clay	(Argentina) Lucas Arnold Ker (Argentina) Mariano Hood; 7–6^{(7–5)}, 6–1	(Argentina) José Acasuso (Spain) Oscar Hernandez	(Italy) Filippo Volandri (Germany) Florian Mayer	(Romania) Victor Hănescu (France) Paul-Henri Mathieu (Spain) Félix Mantilla (Spain) David Ferrer
13 Sep	Delray Beach International Tennis Championships; Delray Beach, USA; International Series $380,000 – hard Singles – Doubles	(Brazil) Ricardo Mello; 7–6^{(7–2)}, 6–3	(United States) Vincent Spadea	(United States) Jeff Salzenstein (Croatia) Mario Ančić	(United States) Hugo Armando (United Kingdom) Greg Rusedski (Denmark) Kenneth Carlsen (France) Jérôme Golmard
13 Sep	Delray Beach International Tennis Championships; Delray Beach, USA; International Series $380,000 – hard Singles – Doubles	(India) Leander Paes (Czech Republic) Radek Štěpánek; 6–0, 6–3	(Argentina) Gastón Etlis (Argentina) Martín Rodríguez	(United States) Jeff Salzenstein (Croatia) Mario Ančić	(United States) Hugo Armando (United Kingdom) Greg Rusedski (Denmark) Kenneth Carlsen (France) Jérôme Golmard
20 Sep	Davis Cup by BNP Paribas Semifinals; Charleston, SC, USA – hard Alicante, Spain – clay	Semifinal winners United States 4–0; Spain 4–1	Semifinal losers Belarus; France		
27 Sep	Thailand Open; Bangkok, Thailand; International Series $550,000 – hard (i); Singles – Doubles	(Switzerland) Roger Federer; 6–4, 6–0	(United States) Andy Roddick	(Thailand) Paradorn Srichaphan (Russia) Marat Safin	(Sweden) Robin Söderling (Netherlands) Dennis van Scheppingen (Brazil) Flávio Saretta (Sweden) Thomas Johansson
27 Sep	Thailand Open; Bangkok, Thailand; International Series $550,000 – hard (i); Singles – Doubles	(United States) Justin Gimelstob (United States) Graydon Oliver; 5–7, 6–4, 6–4	(Switzerland) Yves Allegro (Switzerland) Roger Federer	(Thailand) Paradorn Srichaphan (Russia) Marat Safin	(Sweden) Robin Söderling (Netherlands) Dennis van Scheppingen (Brazil) Flávio Saretta (Sweden) Thomas Johansson
27 Sep	Campionati Internazionali di Sicilia; Palermo, Italy; International Series $375,500 – clay	(Czech Republic) Tomáš Berdych; 6–3, 6–3	(Italy) Filippo Volandri	(Argentina) Juan Mónaco (Spain) David Ferrer	(Chile) Nicolás Massú (France) Olivier Mutis (Russia) Nikolay Davydenko (Italy) Andreas Seppi
27 Sep	Campionati Internazionali di Sicilia; Palermo, Italy; International Series $375,500 – clay	(Argentina) Lucas Arnold Ker (Argentina) Mariano Hood; 7–5, 6–2	(Argentina) Gastón Etlis (Argentina) Martín Rodríguez	(Argentina) Juan Mónaco (Spain) David Ferrer	(Chile) Nicolás Massú (France) Olivier Mutis (Russia) Nikolay Davydenko (Italy) Andreas Seppi
27 Sep	Heineken Open Shanghai; Shanghai, China; International Series $380,000 – hard	(Argentina) Guillermo Cañas; 6–1, 6–0	(Germany) Lars Burgsmüller	(Denmark) Kenneth Carlsen (Czech Republic) Jiří Novák	(Italy) Davide Sanguinetti (Luxembourg) Gilles Müller (Brazil) Ricardo Mello (United States) Jan-Michael Gambill
27 Sep	Heineken Open Shanghai; Shanghai, China; International Series $380,000 – hard	(United States) Jared Palmer (Czech Republic) Pavel Vízner; 4–6, 7–6^{(7–4)}, 7–6^{(13–11)}	(United States) Rick Leach (United States) Brian MacPhie	(Denmark) Kenneth Carlsen (Czech Republic) Jiří Novák	(Italy) Davide Sanguinetti (Luxembourg) Gilles Müller (Brazil) Ricardo Mello (United States) Jan-Michael Gambill

=== October ===
Week	Tournament	Champions	Runners-up	Semifinalists	Quarterfinalists
4 Oct	Grand Prix de Tennis de Lyon; Lyon, France; International Series $791,750 – carpet (i) 32S/16D; Singles – Doubles	(Sweden) Robin Söderling; 6–2, 3–6, 6–4	(Belgium) Xavier Malisse	(Spain) David Ferrer (United States) Vincent Spadea	(Russia) Mikhail Youzhny (Sweden) Jonas Björkman (Sweden) Joachim Johansson (Austria) Jürgen Melzer
4 Oct	Grand Prix de Tennis de Lyon; Lyon, France; International Series $791,750 – carpet (i) 32S/16D; Singles – Doubles	(Israel) Jonathan Erlich (Israel) Andy Ram; 7–6^{(7–2)}, 6–2	(Sweden) Jonas Björkman (Czech Republic) Radek Štěpánek	(Spain) David Ferrer (United States) Vincent Spadea	(Russia) Mikhail Youzhny (Sweden) Jonas Björkman (Sweden) Joachim Johansson (Austria) Jürgen Melzer
4 Oct	AIG Japan Open Tennis Championships; Tokyo, Japan; International Series Gold $690,000 – hard Singles – Doubles	(Czech Republic) Jiří Novák; 5–7, 6–1, 6–3	(United States) Taylor Dent	(Australia) Lleyton Hewitt (Czech Republic) Bohdan Ulihrach	(France) Cyril Saulnier (Thailand) Paradorn Srichaphan (Germany) Björn Phau (Luxembourg) Gilles Müller
4 Oct	AIG Japan Open Tennis Championships; Tokyo, Japan; International Series Gold $690,000 – hard Singles – Doubles	(United States) Jared Palmer (Czech Republic) Pavel Vízner; 5–1 ret.	(Czech Republic) Jiří Novák (Czech Republic) Petr Pála	(Australia) Lleyton Hewitt (Czech Republic) Bohdan Ulihrach	(France) Cyril Saulnier (Thailand) Paradorn Srichaphan (Germany) Björn Phau (Luxembourg) Gilles Müller
11 Oct	Open de Moselle; Metz, France; International Series $375,750 – hard (i)	(France) Jérôme Haehnel; 7–6^{(11–9)}, 6–4	(France) Richard Gasquet	(France) Paul-Henri Mathieu (United States) Jeff Morrison	(Croatia) Ivan Ljubičić (France) Arnaud Clément (Spain) Àlex Corretja (France) Gaël Monfils
11 Oct	Open de Moselle; Metz, France; International Series $375,750 – hard (i)	(France) Arnaud Clément (France) Nicolas Mahut; 6–2, 7–6^{(10–8)}	(Croatia) Ivan Ljubičić (Italy) Uros Vico	(France) Paul-Henri Mathieu (United States) Jeff Morrison	(Croatia) Ivan Ljubičić (France) Arnaud Clément (Spain) Àlex Corretja (France) Gaël Monfils
11 Oct	Kremlin Cup; Moscow, Russia; International Series $1,000,000 – carpet (i); Singles – Doubles	(Russia) Nikolay Davydenko; 3–6, 6–3, 7–5	(United Kingdom) Greg Rusedski	(Russia) Mikhail Youzhny (Slovakia) Dominik Hrbatý	(Czech Republic) Radek Štěpánek (Denmark) Kenneth Carlsen (Russia) Igor Kunitsyn (Sweden) Joachim Johansson
11 Oct	Kremlin Cup; Moscow, Russia; International Series $1,000,000 – carpet (i); Singles – Doubles	(Russia) Igor Andreev (Russia) Nikolay Davydenko; 3–6, 6–3, 6–4	(India) Mahesh Bhupathi (Sweden) Jonas Björkman	(Russia) Mikhail Youzhny (Slovakia) Dominik Hrbatý	(Czech Republic) Radek Štěpánek (Denmark) Kenneth Carlsen (Russia) Igor Kunitsyn (Sweden) Joachim Johansson
11 Oct	BA-CA-TennisTrophy; Vienna, Austria; International Series Gold $682,750 – hard (i); Singles – Doubles	(Spain) Feliciano López; 6–4, 1–6, 7–5, 3–6, 7–5	(Argentina) Guillermo Cañas	(Germany) Tommy Haas (Italy) Davide Sanguinetti	(Argentina) David Nalbandian (United States) Robby Ginepri (Germany) Rainer Schüttler (Chile) Nicolás Massú
11 Oct	BA-CA-TennisTrophy; Vienna, Austria; International Series Gold $682,750 – hard (i); Singles – Doubles	(Czech Republic) Martin Damm (Czech Republic) Cyril Suk; 6–7^{(4–7)}, 6–4, 7–6^{(7–4)}	(Argentina) Gastón Etlis (Argentina) Martín Rodríguez	(Germany) Tommy Haas (Italy) Davide Sanguinetti	(Argentina) David Nalbandian (United States) Robby Ginepri (Germany) Rainer Schüttler (Chile) Nicolás Massú
18 Oct	Madrid Masters; Madrid, Spain; Masters Series $2,175,500 – hard (i); Singles – Doubles	(Russia) Marat Safin; 6–2, 6–4, 6–3	(Argentina) David Nalbandian	(Croatia) Ivan Ljubičić (United States) Andre Agassi	(Sweden) Joachim Johansson (United States) Taylor Dent (Peru) Luis Horna (Spain) Tommy Robredo
18 Oct	Madrid Masters; Madrid, Spain; Masters Series $2,175,500 – hard (i); Singles – Doubles	(The Bahamas) Mark Knowles (Canada) Daniel Nestor; 6–3, 6–4	(United States) Bob Bryan (United States) Mike Bryan	(Croatia) Ivan Ljubičić (United States) Andre Agassi	(Sweden) Joachim Johansson (United States) Taylor Dent (Peru) Luis Horna (Spain) Tommy Robredo
25 Oct	Davidoff Swiss Indoors; Basel, Switzerland; International Series $989,750 – carpet (i); Singles – Doubles	(Czech Republic) Jiří Novák; 5–7, 6–3, 6–4, 1–6, 6–2	(Argentina) David Nalbandian	(Chile) Nicolás Massú (Austria) Stefan Koubek	(Czech Republic) Bohdan Ulihrach (Germany) Rainer Schüttler (Croatia) Ivan Ljubičić (United Kingdom) Tim Henman
25 Oct	Davidoff Swiss Indoors; Basel, Switzerland; International Series $989,750 – carpet (i); Singles – Doubles	(United States) Bob Bryan (United States) Mike Bryan; 7–6^{(11–9)}, 6–2	(Argentina) Lucas Arnold Ker (Argentina) Mariano Hood	(Chile) Nicolás Massú (Austria) Stefan Koubek	(Czech Republic) Bohdan Ulihrach (Germany) Rainer Schüttler (Croatia) Ivan Ljubičić (United Kingdom) Tim Henman
25 Oct	St. Petersburg Open; St. Petersburg, Russia; International Series $1,000,000 – carpet (i); Singles – Doubles	(Russia) Mikhail Youzhny; 6–2, 6–2	(Slovakia) Karol Beck	(France) Michaël Llodra (United Kingdom) Greg Rusedski	(Russia) Marat Safin (France) Cyril Saulnier (France) Julien Benneteau (Croatia) Ivo Karlović
25 Oct	St. Petersburg Open; St. Petersburg, Russia; International Series $1,000,000 – carpet (i); Singles – Doubles	(France) Arnaud Clément (France) Michaël Llodra; 6–3, 6–2	(Slovakia) Dominik Hrbatý (Czech Republic) Jaroslav Levinský	(France) Michaël Llodra (United Kingdom) Greg Rusedski	(Russia) Marat Safin (France) Cyril Saulnier (France) Julien Benneteau (Croatia) Ivo Karlović
25 Oct	Stockholm Open; Stockholm, Sweden; International Series $643,750 – hard (i); Singles – Doubles	(Sweden) Thomas Johansson; 3–6, 6–3, 7–6^{(7–4)}	(United States) Andre Agassi	(Germany) Tommy Haas (Sweden) Michael Ryderstedt	(Spain) Fernando Verdasco (Belgium) Olivier Rochus (Romania) Andrei Pavel (Sweden) Joachim Johansson
25 Oct	Stockholm Open; Stockholm, Sweden; International Series $643,750 – hard (i); Singles – Doubles	(Spain) Feliciano López (Spain) Fernando Verdasco; 6–4, 6–4	(Australia) Wayne Arthurs (Australia) Paul Hanley	(Germany) Tommy Haas (Sweden) Michael Ryderstedt	(Spain) Fernando Verdasco (Belgium) Olivier Rochus (Romania) Andrei Pavel (Sweden) Joachim Johansson

=== November ===
Week	Tournament	Champions	Runners-up	Semifinalists	Quarterfinalists
1 Nov	Paris Masters; Paris, France; Masters Series $2,425,250 – carpet (i); Singles – Doubles	(Russia) Marat Safin; 6–3, 7–6^{(7–5)}, 6–3	(Czech Republic) Radek Štěpánek	(Belarus) Max Mirnyi (Argentina) Guillermo Cañas	(Sweden) Robin Söderling (Russia) Mikhail Youzhny (Spain) Feliciano López (Australia) Lleyton Hewitt
1 Nov	Paris Masters; Paris, France; Masters Series $2,425,250 – carpet (i); Singles – Doubles	(Sweden) Jonas Björkman (Australia) Todd Woodbridge; 6–3, 6–4	(Zimbabwe) Wayne Black (Zimbabwe) Kevin Ullyett	(Belarus) Max Mirnyi (Argentina) Guillermo Cañas	(Sweden) Robin Söderling (Russia) Mikhail Youzhny (Spain) Feliciano López (Australia) Lleyton Hewitt
8 Nov; 15 Nov	Tennis Masters Cup; Houston, USA; Tennis Masters Cup $4,450,000 – hard Singles – Doubles	(Switzerland) Roger Federer; 6–3, 6–2	(Australia) Lleyton Hewitt	(United States) Andy Roddick (Russia) Marat Safin	(Spain) Carlos Moyà (Argentina) Gastón Gaudio (United Kingdom) Tim Henman (Argentina) Guillermo Coria
8 Nov; 15 Nov	Tennis Masters Cup; Houston, USA; Tennis Masters Cup $4,450,000 – hard Singles – Doubles	(United States) Bob Bryan (United States) Mike Bryan; 4–6, 7–5, 6–4, 6–2	(Zimbabwe) Wayne Black (Zimbabwe) Kevin Ullyett	(United States) Andy Roddick (Russia) Marat Safin	(Spain) Carlos Moyà (Argentina) Gastón Gaudio (United Kingdom) Tim Henman (Argentina) Guillermo Coria
29 Nov	Davis Cup by BNP Paribas Final; Seville, Spain – clay	Spain 3–2	United States		

== Statistical information ==
Players and titles won (Grand Slam, Masters Cup, and Olympic titles in bold), listed in order of number of titles:

- (Switzerland) Roger Federer – **Australian Open**, Dubai, Indian Wells Masters, Hamburg Masters, Halle, **Wimbledon**, Gstaad, Canada Masters, **US Open**, Bangkok and **Masters Cup** (11)
- (Australia) Lleyton Hewitt – Sydney, Rotterdam, Washington, D.C., and Long Island (4)
- (United States) Andy Roddick – San Jose, Miami Masters, London Queen's Club and Indianapolis (4)
- (Argentina) Guillermo Cañas – Stuttgart, Umag and Shanghai (3)
- (Slovakia) Dominik Hrbatý – Adelaide, Auckland and Marseille (3)
- (Spain) Carlos Moyà – Chennai, Acapulco and Rome Masters (3)
- (Russia) Marat Safin – Beijing, Madrid Masters and Paris Masters (3)
- (Argentina) Guillermo Coria – Buenos Aires and Monte Carlo Masters (2)
- (Russia) Nikolay Davydenko – Munich and Moscow (2)
- (Germany) Tommy Haas – Houston and Los Angeles (2)
- (Chile) Nicolás Massú – Kitzbühel and **Athens Olympics** (2)
- (Czech Republic) Jiří Novák – Tokyo and Basel (2)
- (Argentina) José Acasuso – Bucharest (1)
- (United States) Andre Agassi – Cincinnati Masters (1)
- (Czech Republic) Tomáš Berdych – Palermo (1)
- (Argentina) Juan Ignacio Chela – Estoril (1)
- (France) Antony Dupuis – Milan (1)
- (France) Nicolas Escudé – Doha (1)
- (Argentina) Gastón Gaudio – **French Open** (1)
- (Chile) Fernando González – Viña del Mar (1)
- (France) Jérôme Haehnel – Metz (1)
- (Sweden) Joachim Johansson – Memphis (1)
- (Sweden) Thomas Johansson – Stockholm (1)
- (Brazil) Gustavo Kuerten – Costa do Sauipe (1)
- (France) Michaël Llodra – 's-Hertogenbosch (1)
- (Spain) Feliciano López – Vienna (1)
- (Brazil) Ricardo Mello – Delray Beach (1)
- (Spain) Rafael Nadal – Sopot (1)
- (Spain) Tommy Robredo – Barcelona (1)
- (United Kingdom) Greg Rusedski – Newport (1)
- (Sweden) Robin Söderling – Lyon (1)
- (United States) Vincent Spadea – Scottsdale (1)
- (Thailand) Paradorn Srichaphan – Nottingham (1)
- (Spain) Fernando Verdasco – Valencia (1)
- (Spain) Santiago Ventura – Casablanca (1)
- (Netherlands) Martin Verkerk – Amersfoort (1)
- (Italy) Filippo Volandri – St. Poelten (1)
- (Russia) Mikhail Youzhny – St. Petersburg (1)
- (Argentina) Mariano Zabaleta – Båstad (1)

The following players won their first title:

- (Czech Republic) Tomáš Berdych – Palermo
- (France) Antony Dupuis – Milan
- (France) Jérôme Haehnel – Metz
- (Sweden) Joachim Johansson – Memphis
- (France) Michaël Llodra – 's-Hertogenbosch
- (Spain) Feliciano López – Vienna
- (Brazil) Ricardo Mello – Delray Beach
- (Spain) Rafael Nadal – Sopot
- (Sweden) Robin Söderling – Lyon
- (United States) Vincent Spadea – Scottsdale
- (Spain) Santiago Ventura – Casablanca
- (Spain) Fernando Verdasco – Valencia
- (Italy) Filippo Volandri – St. Poelten

Titles won by nation:

- Switzerland 11 (**Australian Open**, Dubai, Indian Wells Masters, Hamburg Masters, Halle, **Wimbledon**, Gstaad, Canada Masters, **US Open**, Bangkok and **Masters Cup**)
- Argentina 9 (Buenos Aires, Estoril, Monte Carlo Masters, **French Open**, Båstad, Stuttgart, Umag, Bucharest and Shanghai)
- Spain 8 (Chennai, Acapulco, Valencia, Barcelona, Rome Masters, Casablanca, Sopot and Vienna)
- Russia 6 (Munich, Beijing, Moscow, Madrid Masters, St. Petersburg and Paris Masters)
- United States 6 (San Jose, Scottsdale, Miami Masters, London Queen's Club, Indianapolis and Cincinnati Masters)
- Australia 4 (Sydney, Rotterdam, Washington, D.C., and Long Island)
- France 4 (Doha, Milan, 's-Hertogenbosch and Metz)
- Chile 3 (Viña del Mar, Kitzbühel and **Athens Olympics**)
- Czech Republic 3 (Palermo, Tokyo and Basel)
- Slovakia 3 (Adelaide, Auckland and Marseille)
- Sweden 3 (Memphis, Lyon and Stockholm)
- Brazil 2 (Costa do Sauipe and Delray Beach)
- Germany 2 (Houston and Los Angeles)
- Italy 1 (St. Poelten)
- Netherlands 1 (Amersfoort)
- Thailand 1 (Nottingham)
- United Kingdom 1 (Newport)

== Entry rankings ==
=== Singles ===
As of 29 December 2003
Rk	Name	Nation	Points
1	Andy Roddick	USA	4,535
2	Roger Federer	SUI	4,375
3	Juan Carlos Ferrero	ESP	4,205
4	Andre Agassi	USA	3,425
5	Guillermo Coria	ARG	3,330
6	Rainer Schüttler	GER	3,205
7	Carlos Moyà	ESP	2,280
8	David Nalbandián	ARG	2,060
9	Mark Philippoussis	AUS	1,615
10	Sébastien Grosjean	FRA	1,610
11	Paradorn Srichaphan	THA	1,595
12	Nicolas Massú	CHI	1,559
13	Jiří Novák	CZE	1,510
14	Younes El Aynaoui	MAR	1,480
15	Tim Henman	GBR	1,480
16	Gustavo Kuerten	BRA	1,470
17	Lleyton Hewitt	AUS	1,450
18	Sjeng Schalken	NED	1,445
19	Martin Verkerk	NED	1,425
20	Mardy Fish	USA	1,300

Year-end rankings 2004 (27 December 2004)
Rk	Name	Nation	Points	High	Low	Change
1	Roger Federer	SUI	6,335	1	2	▲1
2	Andy Roddick	USA	3,655	1	3	▼1
3	Lleyton Hewitt	AUS	3,590	3	20	▲14
4	Marat Safin	RUS	3,060	4	86	▲73
5	Carlos Moyà	ESP	2,520	4	9	▲2
6	Tim Henman	GBR	2,465	4	15	▲9
7	Guillermo Coria	ARG	2,400	3	7	▼2
8	Andre Agassi	USA	2,100	4	11	▼4
9	David Nalbandián	ARG	1,945	4	14	▼1
10	Gastón Gaudio	ARG	1,920	8	44	▲24
11	Joachim Johansson	SWE	1,595	11	95	▲84
12	Guillermo Cañas	ARG	1,595	11	272	▲260
13	Tommy Robredo	ESP	1,465	12	27	▲8
14	Dominik Hrbatý	SVK	1,380	12	61	▲47
15	Sébastien Grosjean	FRA	1,370	9	16	▼5
16	Mikhail Youzhny	RUS	1,340	16	58	▲27
17	Tommy Haas	GER	1,330	17	NR	NR
18	Andrei Pavel	ROU	1,325	13	69	▲51
19	Nicolas Massú	CHI	1,320	9	19	▼7
20	Vincent Spadea	USA	1,285	19	36	▲9

== Retirements ==
Following is a list of notable players (winners of a main tour title, and/or part of the ATP rankings top 100 (singles) or top 50 (doubles) for at least one week) who announced their retirement from professional tennis, became inactive (after not playing for more than 52 weeks), or were permanently banned from playing, during the 2004 season:

- ITA Renzo Furlan (born 17 May 1970 in Conegliano, Veneto, Italy) He turned professional in 1988 and reached his career-high ranking of world no. 19 in 1996. He reached the quarterfinals of the French Open in 1995 and earned two career ATP titles. He played his last match in Lugano in June against Jérôme Haehnel.
- GER Marc-Kevin Goellner (born 22 September 1970 in Rio de Janeiro, Brazil) He turned professional in 1991 and reached his career-high singles ranking of world no. 26 in 1994. He earned two career singles titles and four doubles titles, being ranked no. 25 in doubles. His last singles and doubles matches were in Kish Island, Iran in November.
- CRO Goran Ivanišević (born 13 September 1971 in Split, Croatia) He turned professional in 1988 and reached his career-high ranking of world no. 2 in 1994. He won Wimbledon in 2001, was a semifinalist at the US Open, and a quarterfinalist at the Australian and French Opens. He also won two bronze medals in singles and doubles at the 1992 Olympics. He won 22 singles titles and four doubles titles. He played his last career match at Wimbledon against Lleyton Hewitt.
- SWE Magnus Larsson (born 25 March 1970 in Olofström, Blekinge, Sweden) He turned professional in 1989 and reached his highest singles ranking of world no. 10 in 1995. He reached the semifinals of the French Open in 1994 and the quarterfinals of the US Open three times (1993, 1997, and 1998), as well as earning seven career ATP titles. His highest doubles ranking was no. 26 (also in 1995), and he earned six doubles titles. His final career ATP match was in Copenhagen in February 2003 against Radek Štěpánek.
- USA Todd Martin (born July 8, 1970, in Hinsdale, Illinois) He turned professional in 1990 and reached a career-high ranking of world no. 4. He was a finalist at the 1994 Australian Open and the 1999 US Open, as well as earning eight career titles. He played his last match in the first round of the US Open against Fabrice Santoro.
- SWE Magnus Norman (born 30 May 1976 in Filipstad, Sweden) He turned professional in 1995 and reached a career-high ranking of world no. 2. He was a finalist at the French Open in 2000. He won 12 singles titles, including the 2000 Tennis Masters Series tournament in Rome. He played his last singles match in the quarterfinals in Shanghai in September 2003 against Jiří Novák.
- CHI Marcelo Ríos (born December 26, 1975, in Santiago, Chile) He turned professional in 1994 and reached the no. 1 ranking in the world. He was a finalist at the Australian Open in 1998 and a quarterfinalist at the French and US Opens. He played his last career match in April in San Luis Potosí against Mariano Delfino.

== See also ==
- 2004 in tennis
- 2004 WTA Tour
