= 2004 ABN AMRO World Tennis Tournament =

- Date: 16–22 February
- Edition: 32nd
- Category: ATP International Series Gold
- Draw: 32S / 16D
- Prize money: $850,505
- Surface: Hardcourt / indoor
- Location: Rotterdam, Netherlands
- Venue: Rotterdam Ahoy

Champions

Singles
- (Australia) Lleyton Hewitt

Doubles
- (Australia) Paul Hanley / (Czech Republic) Radek Štěpánek
- ABN AMRO World Tennis Tournament

The 2004 ABN AMRO World Tennis Tournament was a men's tennis tournament played on indoor hard courts at Rotterdam Ahoy in the Netherlands. It was part of the International Series Gold of the 2004 ATP Tour. The tournament ran from 16 February through 22 February 2004.

The singles line up was led by new World No. 1, Tennis Masters Cup, Wimbledon and Australian Open winner Roger Federer, reigning French Open champion, US Open runner-up and Australian Open semifinalist Juan Carlos Ferrero and Tokyo and Lyon champion Rainer Schüttler. Other contenders were Chennai runner-up Paradorn Srichaphan, Paris Masters winner Tim Henman, Lleyton Hewitt, Sjeng Schalken and Martin Verkerk.

Sixth-seeded Lleyton Hewitt won the singles title.

== Finals ==
=== Singles ===
(Australia) Lleyton Hewitt defeated (Spain) Juan Carlos Ferrero 6–7^{(1–7)}, 7–5, 6–4

- It was Hewitt's 2nd title of the year and the 21st of his career.

=== Doubles ===
(Australia) Paul Hanley / (Czech Republic) Radek Štěpánek defeated (Israel) Jonathan Erlich / (Israel) Andy Ram 5–7, 7–6^{(7–5)}, 7–5

- It was Hanley's 1st title of the year and the 7th of his career. It was Štěpánek's 1st title of the year and the 7th of his career.
