= 2004 Allianz Suisse Open Gstaad =

- Date: 5–11 July
- Edition: 59th
- Category: International Series
- Draw: 32S / 16D
- Prize money: $525,000
- Surface: Clay / outdoor
- Location: Gstaad, Switzerland
- Venue: Roy Emerson Arena

Champions

Singles
- (Switzerland) Roger Federer

Doubles
- (India) Leander Paes / (Czech Republic) David Rikl
- Swiss Open

The 2004 Allianz Suisse Open Gstaad was a men's tennis tournament played on outdoor clay courts at the Roy Emerson Arena in Gstaad in Switzerland and was part of the International Series of the 2004 ATP Tour. It was the 59th edition of the tournament and was held from July 5 through July 11, 2004. First-seeded Roger Federer won the singles title.

== Finals ==
=== Singles ===
(Switzerland) Roger Federer defeated (Russia) Igor Andreev 6–2, 6–3, 5–7, 6–3

- It was Federer's 7th title of the year and the 18th of his career.

=== Doubles ===
(India) Leander Paes / (Czech Republic) David Rikl defeated (Switzerland) Marc Rosset / (Switzerland) Stan Wawrinka 6–4, 6–2

- It was Paes' 2nd title of the year and the 29th of his career. It was Rikl's 2nd title of the year and the 30th of his career.
