= 2004 Dutch Open (tennis) =

- Date: 12–18 July
- Edition: 47th
- Category: International Series
- Draw: 32S / 16D
- Prize money: €375,750
- Surface: Clay / outdoor
- Location: Amersfoort, Netherlands

Champions

Singles
- (Netherlands) Martin Verkerk

Doubles
- (Czech Republic) Jaroslav Levinský / (Czech Republic) David Škoch
- Dutch Open

The 2004 Dutch Open, also known by its sponsored name Priority Telecom Open, was an ATP men's tennis tournament staged on outdoor clay courts in Amersfoort, Netherlands and part of the International Series of the 2004 ATP Tour. It was the 47th edition of the tournament and was held from 12 July until 18 July 2004. Fourth-seeded Martin Verkerk won his first event of the year, and the second title of his professional career.

== Finals ==
=== Singles ===
(Netherlands) Martin Verkerk defeated (Chile) Fernando González 7–6^{(7–5)}, 4–6, 6–4

- It was Verkerk's only singles title of the year and the 2nd and last of his career.

=== Doubles ===
(Czech Republic) Jaroslav Levinský / (Czech Republic) David Škoch defeated (Argentina) José Acasuso / (Peru) Luis Horna 6–0, 2–6, 7–5
