= 2004 If Stockholm Open =

- Date: 25–31 October
- Edition: 36th
- Category: International Series
- Draw: 32S / 16D
- Prize money: $625,000
- Surface: Hard / indoor
- Location: Stockholm, Sweden
- Venue: Kungliga tennishallen

Champions

Singles
- (Sweden) Thomas Johansson

Doubles
- (Spain) Feliciano López / (Spain) Fernando Verdasco
← 2003 ·	Stockholm Open	· 2005 →

The 2004 If Stockholm Open was an ATP men's tennis tournament played on hard courts and held at the Kungliga tennishallen in Stockholm, Sweden. It was the 36th edition of the event and part of the ATP International Series of the 2004 ATP Tour. The tournament was held from 25 October through 31 October 2004. Unseeded Thomas Johansson won the singles title.

== Finals ==
=== Singles ===
(Sweden) Thomas Johansson defeated (United States) Andre Agassi, 3–6, 6–3, 7–6^{(7–4)}

=== Doubles ===
(Spain) Feliciano López / (Spain) Fernando Verdasco defeated (Australia) Wayne Arthurs / (Australia) Paul Hanley, 6–4, 6–4
