= 2004 Mercedes-Benz Cup =

- Date: July 12–18
- Edition: 78th
- Category: ATP International Series
- Draw: 32S / 16D
- Prize money: $355,000
- Surface: Hard / outdoor
- Location: Los Angeles, United States
- Venue: Los Angeles Tennis Center

Champions

Singles
- (Germany) Tommy Haas

Doubles
- (United States) Bob Bryan / (United States) Mike Bryan
← 2003 ·	Los Angeles Open	· 2005 →

The 2004 Mercedes-Benz Cup was the 2004 edition of the Los Angeles Open men's tennis tournament played on outdoor hardcourts at the Los Angeles Tennis Center. The tournament was held from July 12, 2004 through July 18, 2004 and total prize money awarded was $380,000. The event was part of the International Series of the 2004 ATP Tour and of the 2004 US Open Series. Unseeded Tommy Haas won the singles title and the accompanying $52,000 first-prize money.

== Finals ==
=== Singles ===
(Germany) Tommy Haas defeated (Germany) Nicolas Kiefer 7–6^{(8–6)}, 6–4

=== Doubles ===
(United States) Bob Bryan / (United States) Mike Bryan defeated (Australia) Wayne Arthurs / (Australia) Paul Hanley 6–3, 7–6^{(8–6)}
