= 2004 Brasil Open =

- Date: 23–29 February
- Edition: 4th
- Category: International Series
- Draw: 32S / 16D
- Prize money: $355,000
- Surface: Clay / outdoor
- Location: Mata de São João, Brazil

Champions

Singles
- (Brazil) Gustavo Kuerten

Doubles
- (Poland) Mariusz Fyrstenberg / (Poland) Marcin Matkowski
- Brasil Open

The 2004 Brasil Open was a men's tennis tournament played on outdoor clay courts in Costa do Sauípe resort, Mata de São João, in Brazil and was part of the International Series of the 2004 ATP Tour. It was the fourth edition of the tournament and ran from February 23 through February 29, 2004. Third-seeded Gustavo Kuerten won the singles title.

== Finals ==
=== Singles ===
(Brazil) Gustavo Kuerten defeated (Argentina) Agustín Calleri 3–6, 6–2, 6–3

- It was Kuerten's only singles title of the year and the 20th and last of his career.

=== Doubles ===
(Poland) Mariusz Fyrstenberg / (Poland) Marcin Matkowski defeated (Germany) Tomas Behrend / (Czech Republic) Leoš Friedl 6–2, 6–2

- It was Fyrstenberg's only title of the year and the 2nd of his career. It was Matkowski's only title of the year and the 2nd of his career.
