= 2004 If Stockholm Open – Doubles =

Doubles
- 2004 If Stockholm Open

Final
- Champions: (Spain) Feliciano López (Spain) Fernando Verdasco
- Runners-up: (Australia) Wayne Arthurs (Australia) Paul Hanley
- Score: 6–4, 6–4

Events
Singles	Doubles
← 2003 ·	If Stockholm Open	· 2005 →

Jonas Björkman and Todd Woodbridge were the defending champions, but did not participate this year.

Feliciano López and Fernando Verdasco won the title, defeating Wayne Arthurs and Paul Hanley 6–4, 6–4 in the final.

== Seeds ==
1. (Australia) Wayne Arthurs / (Australia) Paul Hanley (final)
2. (United States) Jared Palmer / (Czech Republic) Pavel Vízner (quarterfinals)
3. (Sweden) Simon Aspelin / (Australia) Todd Perry (quarterfinals)
4. (Argentina) Martín García / (Argentina) Sebastián Prieto (first round)

== Draw ==
=== Key ===
- Q = Qualifier
- WC = Wild card
- LL = Lucky loser
- Alt = Alternate
- SE = Special exempt
- PR = Protected ranking
- ITF = ITF entry
- JE = Junior exempt
- w/o = Walkover
- r = Retired
- d = Defaulted
- SR = Special ranking

=== Draw ===
First round
1	(Australia) W Arthurs (Australia) P Hanley	6	7
(Argentina) A Calleri (Italy) D Sanguinetti	3	5
(United States) R Leach (United States) B MacPhie	6^{5}	7^{9}	7^{7}
(Romania) A Pavel (Belgium) T Vanhoudt	7^{7}	6^{7}	6^{3}
3	(Sweden) S Aspelin (Australia) T Perry	3	6	6
(United States) S Humphries (Belgium) X Malisse	6	0	3
WC	(Sweden) J Landsberg (Sweden) R Lindstedt	1	1
(Sweden) J Johansson (Finland) J Nieminen	6	6
(Australia) J Kerr (United States) J Thomas	6^{1}	7^{8}	6^{4}
(India) M Bhupathi (United States) J-M Gambill	7^{7}	6^{6}	7^{7}
WC	(Sweden) J Settergren (Sweden) R Söderling	6	4	7^{9}
4	(Argentina) M García (Argentina) S Prieto	3	6	6^{7}
(Spain) F López (Spain) F Verdasco	6	6
(Czech Republic) T Cibulec (Czech Republic) D Škoch	4	4
(South Africa) J Coetzee (Australia) A Fisher	3	3
2	(United States) J Palmer (Czech Republic) P Vízner	6	6

Quarterfinals
1	(Australia) W Arthurs (Australia) P Hanley	6	6
(United States) R Leach (United States) B MacPhie	3	3
3	(Sweden) S Aspelin (Australia) T Perry	5	5
(Sweden) J Johansson (Finland) J Nieminen	7	7
(India) M Bhupathi (United States) J-M Gambill	w/o
WC	(Sweden) J Settergren (Sweden) R Söderling
(Spain) F López (Spain) F Verdasco	7^{7}	4	6
2	(United States) J Palmer (Czech Republic) P Vízner	6^{4}	6	4

Semifinals
1	(Australia) W Arthurs (Australia) P Hanley	w/o
(Sweden) J Johansson (Finland) J Nieminen
(India) M Bhupathi (United States) J-M Gambill	6	5	2
(Spain) F López (Spain) F Verdasco	3	7	6

Final
1	(Australia) W Arthurs (Australia) P Hanley	4	4
(Spain) F López (Spain) F Verdasco	6	6
