= 2004 Mercedes-Benz Cup – Singles =

Singles
- 2004 Mercedes-Benz Cup

Final
- Champion: (Germany) Tommy Haas
- Runner-up: (Germany) Nicolas Kiefer
- Score: 7–6^{(8–6)}, 6–4

Details
- Draw: 32 (4 Q / 3 WC )
- Seeds: 8

Events
Singles	Doubles
- Los Angeles Open

Wayne Ferreira was the defending champion, but lost in the first round to Paradorn Srichaphan.

Tommy Haas won the tournament, beating Nicolas Kiefer in the final, 7–6^{(8–6)}, 6–4.

== Seeds ==
1. (United States) Andre Agassi (quarterfinals)
2. (Thailand) Paradorn Srichaphan (second round)
3. (United States) Mardy Fish (quarterfinals)
4. (Slovakia) Dominik Hrbatý (first round)
5. (Netherlands) Sjeng Schalken (second round)
6. (United States) Vincent Spadea (first round)
7. (United States) Taylor Dent (first round)
8. (United States) Robby Ginepri (first round)

== Draw ==
Key

- Q = Qualifier
- WC = Wild card
- LL = Lucky loser
- Alt = Alternate
- ITF = ITF entry
- PR = Protected ranking
- SR = Special ranking
- SE = Special exempt
- JE = Junior exempt
- JR = Junior Accelerator Programme entrant
- CO = College Accelerator Programme entrant
- NG = Next Gen Accelerator Program entrant
- w/o = Walkover
- r = Retired
- d = Defaulted

=== Finals ===
Semifinals
(Germany) Tommy Haas	7	7
(France) Cyril Saulnier	5	5
(Germany) Nicolas Kiefer	3	6	6
WC	(United States) Jeff Morrison	6	2	4

Final
(Germany) Tommy Haas	7^{8}	6
(Germany) Nicolas Kiefer	6^{6}	4

=== Top half ===
First round
1	(United States) A Agassi	6	6
(United States) A Bogomolov Jr.	3	1
(France) J Benneteau	6	7
(Australia) M Philippoussis	1	5
(Australia) W Arthurs	6^{3}	3
(Denmark) K Carlsen	7^{7}	6
(Germany) T Haas	6	6
8	(United States) R Ginepri	4	3
3	(United States) M Fish	7^{7}	6
(Czech Republic) J Vacek	6^{5}	2
(Belgium) G Elseneer	2	6	7
Q	(United States) B Vahaly	6	4	5
(France) A Dupuis	4	7^{7}	4
(Czech Republic) J Hernych	6	6^{0}	6
(France) C Saulnier	6
6	(United States) V Spadea	4	r

Second round
1	(United States) A Agassi	7^{7}	6
(France) J Benneteau	6^{4}	2
(Denmark) K Carlsen	2	0
(Germany) T Haas	6	6
3	(United States) M Fish	6	3	6
(Belgium) G Elseneer	2	6	3
(Czech Republic) J Hernych	3	7^{7}	3
(France) C Saulnier	6	6^{5}	6

Quarterfinals
1	(United States) A Agassi	6^{5}	7^{8}	3
(Germany) T Haas	7^{7}	6^{6}	6
3	(United States) M Fish	6^{6}	6^{7}
(France) C Saulnier	7^{8}	7^{9}

Semifinals
(Germany) T Haas	7	7
(France) C Saulnier	5	5

=== Bottom half ===
First round
7	(United States) T Dent	6^{7}	6	2
(United Kingdom) G Rusedski	7^{9}	3	6
Q	(Israel) A Ram	6	6^{1}	4
(Slovakia) K Beck	4	7^{7}	6
Q	(United States) G Weiner	3	7	6
WC	(South Korea) H-t Lee	6	5	3
(Germany) N Kiefer	7^{7}	4	6
4	(Slovakia) D Hrbatý	6^{0}	6	2
5	(Netherlands) S Schalken	6	6
(France) G Carraz	4	4
(South Africa) W Moodie	6	6
Q	(United States) Z Fleishman	4	2
WC	(United States) J Morrison	6	6
WC	(United States) L Cook	2	2
(South Africa) W Ferreira	3	6^{4}
2	(Thailand) P Srichaphan	6	7^{7}

Second round
(United Kingdom) G Rusedski	3	6	7^{7}
(Slovakia) K Beck	6	3	6^{2}
Q	(United States) G Weiner	4	5
(Germany) N Kiefer	6	7
5	(Netherlands) S Schalken	6^{5}	6	5
(South Africa) W Moodie	7^{7}	2	7
WC	(United States) J Morrison	7	6
2	(Thailand) P Srichaphan	5	4

Quarterfinals
(United Kingdom) G Rusedski	1	4
(Germany) N Kiefer	6	6
(South Africa) W Moodie	3	4
WC	(United States) J Morrison	6	6

Semifinals
(Germany) N Kiefer	3	6	6
WC	(United States) J Morrison	6	2	4
