= 2004 Gerry Weber Open – Singles =

Tennis tournament

Singles
- 2004 Gerry Weber Open

Final
- Champion: (Switzerland) Roger Federer
- Runner-up: (United States) Mardy Fish
- Score: 6–0, 6–3

Details
- Draw: 32
- Seeds: 8

Events
| Singles | Doubles |
| ← 2003 · | Gerry Weber Open | · 2005 → |

Roger Federer was the defending champion, and won in the final 6–0, 6–3 against Mardy Fish. It was his second singles title in Halle. He did not lose a single set in the entire tournament.

== Seeds ==
A champion seed is indicated in bold text while text in italics indicates the round in which that seed was eliminated.

1. (Switzerland) **Roger Federer (champion)**
2. (Germany) Rainer Schüttler (semifinals)
3. (Czech Republic) Jiří Novák (semifinals)
4. (Netherlands) Martin Verkerk (first round)
5. (Russia) Marat Safin (first round)
6. (United States) Mardy Fish (final)
7. (Romania) Andrei Pavel (first round)
8. (Spain) Feliciano López (first round)

== Draw ==
=== Key ===
- Q = Qualifier
- WC = Wild card
- LL = Lucky loser
- Alt = Alternate
- SE = Special exempt
- PR = Protected ranking
- ITF = ITF entry
- JE = Junior exempt
- w/o = Walkover
- r = Retired
- d = Defaulted
- SR = Special ranking

=== Finals ===
Semifinals
1 | (Switzerland) **Roger Federer** | **6** | **6**
3 | (Czech Republic) Jiří Novák | 3 | 4
6 | (United States) **Mardy Fish** | **6** | 4 | **7^{7}**
2 | (Germany) Rainer Schüttler | 4 | **6** | 6^{4}

Final
1 | (Switzerland) **Roger Federer** | **6** | **6**
6 | (United States) Mardy Fish | 0 | 3

=== Top half ===
First round
1 | (Switzerland) **R Federer** | **6** | **6**
(Sweden) T Johansson | 3 | 2
(Germany) F Mayer | **7^{7}** | 2 | 6^{2}
(Russia) **M Youzhny** | 6^{4} | **6** | **7^{7}**
WC | (Germany) A Waske | 1 | 4
(France) **A Clément** | **6** | **6**
(Germany) **A Popp** | 1 | **6** | **6**
7 | (Romania) A Pavel | **6** | 4 | 4
3 | (Czech Republic) **J Novák** | **6** | **6**
(Croatia) I Ljubičić | 2 | 2
Q | (Switzerland) M Kratochvil | 2 | 2
LL | (Switzerland) **M Chiudinelli** | **6** | **6**
(Denmark) **K Carlsen** | 3 | **7^{7}** | **7**
Q | (Germany) M Berrer | **6** | 6^{5} | 5
WC | (Germany) **T Haas** | **6** | **6**
8 | (Spain) F López | 3 | 4

Second round
1 | (Switzerland) **R Federer** | **6** | **6**
(Russia) M Youzhny | 2 | 1
(France) **A Clément** | **7^{7}** | **6**
(Germany) A Popp | 6^{4} | 2
3 | (Czech Republic) **J Novák** | **6** | **6**
LL | (Switzerland) M Chiudinelli | 3 | 1
(Denmark) K Carlsen | **7^{7}** | 2 | 4
WC | (Germany) **T Haas** | 6^{3} | **6** | **6**

Quarterfinals
1 | (Switzerland) **R Federer** | **6** | **7**
(France) A Clément | 3 | 5
3 | (Czech Republic) **J Novák** | **6** | **7^{7}**
WC | (Germany) T Haas | 4 | 6^{1}

Semifinals
1 | (Switzerland) **R Federer** | **6** | **6**
3 | (Czech Republic) J Novák | 3 | 4

=== Bottom half ===
First round
6 | (United States) **M Fish** | **6** | **6**
WC | (Germany) D Prinosil | 4 | 2
(Italy) F Volandri | **6** | 2 | 2
(Armenia) **S Sargsian** | 2 | **6** | **6**
Q | (Italy) **A Seppi** | **7^{7}** | 2 | **6**
(Russia) N Davydenko | 6^{5} | **6** | 3
(Spain) **F Verdasco** | **7** | **7**
4 | (Netherlands) M Verkerk | 5 | 5
5 | (Russia) M Safin | 2 | **7^{7}** | 6^{4}
(Sweden) **J Björkman** | **6** | 6^{3} | **7^{7}**
(Germany) L Burgsmüller | 3 | 4
(Germany) **N Kiefer** | **6** | **6**
(Sweden) **J Johansson** | **7^{7}** | 4 | **6**
(Sweden) R Söderling | 6^{3} | **6** | 3
Q | (Czech Republic) J Hernych | 3 | 2
2 | (Germany) **R Schüttler** | **6** | **6**

Second round
6 | (United States) **M Fish** | **6** | **6**
(Armenia) S Sargsian | 4 | 3
Q | (Italy) A Seppi | 3 | 4
(Spain) **F Verdasco** | **6** | **6**
(Sweden) J Björkman | **7** | 4 | 4
(Germany) **N Kiefer** | 5 | **6** | **6**
(Sweden) J Johansson | 6^{5} | 4
2 | (Germany) **R Schüttler** | **7^{7}** | **6**

Quarterfinals
6 | (United States) **M Fish** | **6** | **6**
(Spain) F Verdasco | 2 | 2
(Germany) N Kiefer | 3 | 6^{2}
2 | (Germany) **R Schüttler** | **6** | **7^{7}**

Semifinals
6 | (United States) **M Fish** | **6** | 4 | **7^{7}**
2 | (Germany) R Schüttler | 4 | **6** | 6^{4}
