= 2004 Brasil Open – Doubles =

Doubles
- 2004 Brasil Open

Final
- Champions: (Poland) Mariusz Fyrstenberg (Poland) Marcin Matkowski
- Runners-up: (Germany) Tomas Behrend (Czech Republic) Leoš Friedl
- Score: 6–2, 6–2

Details
- Draw: 16
- Seeds: 4

Events
Singles	Doubles
← 2003 ·	Brasil Open	· 2005 →

Todd Perry and Thomas Shimada were the defending champions, but only Perry competed that year with Jordan Kerr.

Kerr and Perry lost in the quarterfinals to André Sá and Flávio Saretta.

Mariusz Fyrstenberg and Marcin Matkowski won the final 6–2, 6–2 against Tomas Behrend and Leoš Friedl.

== Seeds ==
1. (Argentina) Lucas Arnold / (Argentina) Mariano Hood (first round)
2. (Sweden) Simon Aspelin / (Italy) Massimo Bertolini (quarterfinals)
3. (Argentina) Martín García / (Argentina) Sebastián Prieto (semifinals)
4. (Australia) Jordan Kerr / (Australia) Todd Perry (quarterfinals)

== Draw ==
=== Key ===
- Q = Qualifier
- WC = Wild card
- LL = Lucky loser
- Alt = Alternate
- ITF = ITF entry
- PR = Protected ranking
- SR = Special ranking
- SE = Special exempt
- JE = Junior exempt
- JR = Junior Accelerator Programme entrant
- CO = College Accelerator Programme entrant
- NG = Next Gen Accelerator Program entrant
- w/o = Walkover
- r = Retired
- d = Defaulted

First round
1	(Argentina) L Arnold (Argentina) M Hood	7	4	4
(Spain) Á López Morón (Spain) A Portas	5	6	6
(Germany) T Behrend (Czech Republic) L Friedl	1	6	6
WC	(Brazil) M Daniel (Brazil) A Simoni	6	1	1
3	(Argentina) M García (Argentina) S Prieto	6	6^{4}	7^{9}
(Spain) Ó Hernández (Peru) L Horna	4	7^{7}	6^{7}
(Spain) D Ferrer (Spain) R Ramírez Hidalgo	7^{7}	5	3
WC	(Brazil) F Ferreiro (Brazil) M Melo	6^{4}	7	6
(United States) D Bowen (Australia) A Fisher	3	6^{4}
(Brazil) A Sá (Brazil) F Saretta	6	7^{7}
(Argentina) F Browne (Argentina) A Calleri	5	7^{7}	3
4	(Australia) J Kerr (Australia) T Perry	7	6^{3}	6
(Poland) M Fyrstenberg (Poland) M Matkowski	4	6	7^{7}
(Argentina) J I Chela (Chile) N Massú	6	1	6^{4}
(Argentina) G Gaudio (Argentina) S Roitman	2	6^{3}
2	(Sweden) S Aspelin (Italy) M Bertolini	6	7^{7}

Quarterfinals
(Spain) Á López Morón (Spain) A Portas	3	1
(Germany) T Behrend (Czech Republic) L Friedl	6	6
3	(Argentina) M García (Argentina) S Prieto	6	6
WC	(Brazil) F Ferreiro (Brazil) M Melo	2	1
(Brazil) A Sá (Brazil) F Saretta	6	6
4	(Australia) J Kerr (Australia) T Perry	4	2
(Poland) M Fyrstenberg (Poland) M Matkowski	7^{7}	7^{7}
2	(Sweden) S Aspelin (Italy) M Bertolini	6^{5}	6^{5}

Semifinals
(Germany) T Behrend (Czech Republic) L Friedl	6	1	6
3	(Argentina) M García (Argentina) S Prieto	1	6	4
(Brazil) A Sá (Brazil) F Saretta	3	4
(Poland) M Fyrstenberg (Poland) M Matkowski	6	6

Final
(Germany) T Behrend (Czech Republic) L Friedl	2	2
(Poland) M Fyrstenberg (Poland) M Matkowski	6	6
