= 2004 Allianz Suisse Open Gstaad – Singles =

Singles
- 2004 Allianz Suisse Open Gstaad

Final
- Champion: (Switzerland) Roger Federer
- Runner-up: (Russia) Igor Andreev
- Score: 6–2, 6–3, 5–7, 6–3

Details
- Draw: 32
- Seeds: 8

Events
Singles	Doubles
- Swiss Open

Jiří Novák was the defending champion but lost in the quarterfinals to Potito Starace.

Roger Federer won in the final 6–2, 6–3, 5–7, 6–3 against Igor Andreev.

== Seeds ==
A champion seed is indicated in bold while text in italics indicates the round in which that seed was eliminated.

1. (Switzerland) **Roger Federer (champion)**
2. (Spain) Juan Carlos Ferrero (first round)
3. (Germany) Rainer Schüttler (semifinals)
4. (Czech Republic) Jiří Novák (quarterfinals)
5. (Romania) Andrei Pavel (first round)
6. (Spain) David Ferrer (second round)
7. (Spain) David Sánchez (first round)
8. (Spain) Albert Costa (second round)

== Draw ==
Key

- Q = Qualifier
- WC = Wild card
- LL = Lucky loser
- Alt = Alternate
- ITF = ITF entry
- PR = Protected ranking
- SR = Special ranking
- SE = Special exempt
- JE = Junior exempt
- JR = Junior Accelerator Programme entrant
- CO = College Accelerator Programme entrant
- NG = Next Gen Accelerator Program entrant
- w/o = Walkover
- r = Retired
- d = Defaulted
- NB: The Final was the best of 5 sets while all other rounds were the best of 3 sets.

=== Final ===
Final
1	(Switzerland) **Roger Federer**	**6**	**6**	5	**6**
	(Russia) Igor Andreev	2	3	**7**	3

=== Section 1 ===
First round
1	(Switzerland) **R Federer**	**6**	**6**
(Germany) T Behrend	1	1
(Spain) Ó Hernández	3	**7^{8}**	3
(Croatia) **I Karlović**	**6**	6^{6}	**6**
WC	(Switzerland) I Heuberger	4	**6**	3
(Czech Republic) **R Štěpánek**	**6**	1	**6**
WC	(Switzerland) **M Rosset**	**7^{7}**	**6**
5	(Romania) A Pavel	6^{5}	4
4	(Czech Republic) **J Novák**	**6**	**6**
(Argentina) J Acasuso	3	3
(Spain) **A Montañés**	6^{5}	**7^{7}**	**6**
Q	(Switzerland) M Chiudinelli	**7^{7}**	6^{2}	4
(Germany) L Burgsmüller	6^{4}	2
(Romania) **V Hanescu**	**7^{7}**	**6**
Q	(Italy) **P Starace**	**6**	3	**6**
7	(Spain) D Sánchez	2	**6**	3

Second round
1	(Switzerland) **R Federer**	6^{5}	**6**	**7^{7}**
(Croatia) I Karlović	**7^{7}**	3	6^{4}
(Czech Republic) **R Štěpánek**	**6**	1	**6**
WC	(Switzerland) M Rosset	4	**6**	3
4	(Czech Republic) **J Novák**	3	**6**	**6**
(Spain) A Montañés	**6**	3	3
(Romania) V Hanescu	**6**	6^{3}	6^{1}
Q	(Italy) **P Starace**	3	**7^{7}**	**7^{7}**

Quarterfinals
1	(Switzerland) **R Federer**	**6**	5	**6**
(Czech Republic) R Štěpánek	1	**7**	4
4	(Czech Republic) J Novák	4	3
Q	(Italy) **P Starace**	**6**	**6**

Semifinals
1	(Switzerland) **R Federer**	**6**	3	**6**
Q	(Italy) P Starace	3	**6**	3

=== Section 2 ===
First round
6	(Spain) **D Ferrer**	2	**6**	**6**
(Czech Republic) T Berdych	**6**	3	4
(Belgium) C Rochus	**6**	2	4
(Spain) **F Mantilla**	3	**6**	**6**
(Germany) **F Mayer**	**7**	**6**
(Spain) A Portas	5	3
WC	(Switzerland) M Kratochvil	4	**6**	3
3	(Germany) **R Schüttler**	**6**	1	**6**
8	(Spain) **A Costa**	**6**	**7^{7}**
(Czech Republic) B Ulihrach	4	6^{5}
Q	(Italy) A Seppi	**6**	4	2
(Russia) **I Andreev**	3	**6**	**6**
Q	(Switzerland) S Wawrinka	6^{5}	4
(Spain) **R Ramírez Hidalgo**	**7^{7}**	**6**
(Austria) **S Koubek**	**7^{7}**	**6**
2	(Spain) J C Ferrero	6^{5}	4

Second round
6	(Spain) D Ferrer	3	6^{2}
(Spain) **F Mantilla**	**6**	**7^{7}**
(Germany) F Mayer	3	2
3	(Germany) **R Schüttler**	**6**	**6**
8	(Spain) A Costa	2	4
(Russia) **I Andreev**	**6**	**6**
(Spain) **R Ramírez Hidalgo**	**6**	**6**
(Austria) S Koubek	3	4

Quarterfinals
(Spain) F Mantilla	1	**6**	2
3	(Germany) **R Schüttler**	**6**	4	**6**
(Russia) **I Andreev**	**6**	**6**
(Spain) R Ramírez Hidalgo	3	4

Semifinals
3	(Germany) R Schüttler	2	**6**	6^{6}
(Russia) **I Andreev**	**6**	3	**7^{8}**
