= 2004 Dutch Open – Singles =

Singles
- 2004 Dutch Open

Final
- Champion: (Netherlands) Martin Verkerk
- Runner-up: (Chile) Fernando González
- Score: 7–6^{(7–5)}, 4–6, 6–4

Events
Singles	Doubles
← 2003 ·	Dutch Open	· 2005 →

Nicolás Massú was the defending champion, but lost in the semifinals this year.

Martin Verkerk won the tournament, beating Fernando González in the final, 7–6^{(7–5)}, 4–6, 6–4.

== Seeds ==
1. (Chile) Nicolás Massú (semifinals)
2. (Chile) Fernando González (final)
3. (Peru) Luis Horna (first round)
4. (Netherlands) Martin Verkerk (champion)
5. (Spain) David Sánchez (quarterfinals)
6. (Russia) Igor Andreev (quarterfinals)
7. (Spain) Alberto Martín (quarterfinals)
8. (Spain) Albert Montañés (first round)

== Draw ==
=== Key ===
- Q = Qualifier
- WC = Wild card
- LL = Lucky loser
- Alt = Alternate
- SE = Special exempt
- PR = Protected ranking
- ITF = ITF entry
- JE = Junior exempt
- w/o = Walkover
- r = Retired
- d = Defaulted
- SR = Special ranking

=== Finals ===
Semifinals
1	(Chile) Nicolás Massú	3	7^{7}	3
4	(Netherlands) Martin Verkerk	6	6^{4}	6
(Netherlands) Dennis van Scheppingen	6^{5}	4
2	(Chile) Fernando González	7^{7}	6

Final
4	(Netherlands) Martin Verkerk	7^{7}	4	6
2	(Chile) Fernando González	6^{5}	6	4

=== Top half ===
First round
1	(Chile) N Massú	6	6
(Belgium) K Vliegen	3	4
(Netherlands) R Sluiter	6	6
(France) N Thomann	1	3
(Belgium) O Rochus	3	6^{2}
(Spain) A Portas	6	7^{7}
(Germany) T Behrend	6	6
8	(Spain) A Montañés	3	0
4	(Netherlands) M Verkerk	6	3	6
WC	(Netherlands) M van Gemerden	4	6	1
(Switzerland) M Rosset	5	1
(Chile) A García	7	6
WC	(Netherlands) P Wessels	6	3	3
(France) J-R Lisnard	2	6	6
Q	(Poland) M Przysiężny	4	4
5	(Spain) D Sánchez	6	6

Second round
1	(Chile) N Massú	6	7^{7}
(Netherlands) R Sluiter	4	6^{4}
(Spain) A Portas	2	7	2
(Germany) T Behrend	6	5	6
4	(Netherlands) M Verkerk	6^{5}	7^{7}	6
(Chile) A García	7^{7}	6^{4}	2
(France) J-R Lisnard	2	6	3
5	(Spain) D Sánchez	6	3	6

Quarterfinals
1	(Chile) N Massú	6	6
(Germany) T Behrend	2	3
4	(Netherlands) M Verkerk	1	7^{7}	6
5	(Spain) D Sánchez	6	6^{2}	4

Semifinals
1	(Chile) N Massú	3	7^{7}	3
4	(Netherlands) M Verkerk	6	6^{4}	6

=== Bottom half ===
First round
7	(Spain) A Martín	6	6
WC	(Netherlands) Nick van der Meer	0	4
Q	(Australia) P Luczak	6	4	6
(Netherlands) J van Lottum	4	6	2
Q	(Czech Republic) J Vaněk	3	6	4
(Netherlands) D van Scheppingen	6	2	6
Q	(Colombia) A Falla	6	6
3	(Peru) L Horna	2	1
6	(Russia) I Andreev	6	6
(Spain) R Ramírez Hidalgo	2	2
(Belgium) C Rochus	7	6
(Brazil) F Saretta	5	3
(Spain) Ó Hernández	6	6
(France) O Mutis	1	3
(Argentina) J Acasuso	6	4	1
2	(Chile) F González	4	6	6

Second round
7	(Spain) A Martín	6	4	7^{8}
Q	(Australia) P Luczak	4	6	6^{6}
(Netherlands) D van Scheppingen	6	6
Q	(Colombia) A Falla	2	0
6	(Russia) I Andreev	4	6	6
(Belgium) C Rochus	6	2	1
(Spain) Ó Hernández	5	3
2	(Chile) F González	7	6

Quarterfinals
7	(Spain) A Martín	4	2
(Netherlands) D van Scheppingen	6	6
6	(Russia) I Andreev	3	5
2	(Chile) F González	6	7

Semifinals
(Netherlands) D van Scheppingen	6^{5}	4
2	(Chile) F González	7^{7}	6
