= 2004 If Stockholm Open – Singles =

Singles
- 2004 If Stockholm Open

Final
- Champion: (Sweden) Thomas Johansson
- Runner-up: (United States) Andre Agassi
- Score: 3–6, 6–3, 7–6^{(7–4)}

Details
- Draw: 32
- Seeds: 8

Events
Singles	Doubles
← 2003 ·	If Stockholm Open	· 2005 →

Mardy Fish was the defending champion, but did not participate this year.

Thomas Johansson won the singles event at the 2004 If Stockholm Open tennis tournament, beating Andre Agassi in the final, 3–6, 6–3, 7–6^{(7–4)}.

== Seeds ==
1. (United States) Andre Agassi (final)
2. (Sweden) Joachim Johansson (quarterfinals, retired)
3. (Romania) Andrei Pavel (quarterfinals)
4. (Germany) Tommy Haas (semifinals)
5. (Spain) Feliciano López (second round)
6. (Sweden) Robin Söderling (second round)
7. (Czech Republic) Tomáš Berdych (first round)
8. (Spain) Fernando Verdasco (quarterfinals)

== Draw ==
=== Key ===
- Q = Qualifier
- WC = Wild card
- LL = Lucky loser
- Alt = Alternate
- SE = Special exempt
- PR = Protected ranking
- ITF = ITF entry
- JE = Junior exempt
- w/o = Walkover
- r = Retired
- d = Defaulted
- SR = Special ranking

=== Finals ===
Semifinals
1	(United States) Andre Agassi	7^{7}	7^{7}
4	(Germany) Tommy Haas	6^{5}	6^{4}
(Sweden) Thomas Johansson	6	6
WC	(Sweden) Michael Ryderstedt	3	2

Final
1	(United States) Andre Agassi	6	3	6^{4}
(Sweden) Thomas Johansson	3	6	7^{7}

=== Top half ===
First round
1	(United States) A Agassi	6	6
(Belgium) K Vliegen	2	4
(Australia) W Arthurs	6	4	4
(Sweden) J Björkman	4	6	6
(Netherlands) R Sluiter	6	6
LL	(Norway) JF Andersen	3	4
(United States) R Ginepri	2	1^{r}
8	(Spain) F Verdasco	6	2
4	(Germany) T Haas	7^{7}	6
Q	(Italy) D Sanguinetti	6^{5}	4
WC	(Denmark) K Carlsen	6	6
WC	(Sweden) E Eleskovic	0	1
Q	(Sweden) J Settergren	3	2
(Belgium) O Rochus	6	6
Q	(Serbia and Montenegro) J Tipsarević	3	7	6
7	(Czech Republic) T Berdych	6	5	1

Second round
1	(United States) A Agassi	6	6
(Sweden) J Björkman	3	4
(Netherlands) R Sluiter	4	2
8	(Spain) F Verdasco	6	6
4	(Germany) T Haas	7	7
WC	(Denmark) K Carlsen	5	5
(Belgium) O Rochus	6	7
Q	(Serbia and Montenegro) J Tipsarević	4	5

Quarterfinals
1	(United States) A Agassi	7^{7}	6
8	(Spain) F Verdasco	6^{4}	2
4	(Germany) T Haas	6	7^{7}
(Belgium) O Rochus	3	6^{4}

Semifinals
1	(United States) A Agassi	7^{7}	7^{7}
4	(Germany) T Haas	6^{5}	6^{4}

=== Bottom half ===
First round
6	(Sweden) R Söderling	7^{7}	6
(Sweden) T Enqvist	6^{4}	3
(Sweden) T Johansson	7^{7}	7^{7}
(Belgium) X Malisse	6^{4}	6^{1}
Q	(Czech Republic) M Tabara	6	6
(Germany) P Kohlschreiber	0	4
(Argentina) A Calleri	4	6^{4}
3	(Romania) A Pavel	6	7^{7}
5	(Spain) F López	7^{7}	7
(United States) J Morrison	6^{5}	5
WC	(Sweden) M Ryderstedt	6	6
(Spain) O Hernández	4	4
(Finland) J Nieminen	6^{5}	6	2
(United States) J-M Gambill	7^{7}	3	6
(Chile) A García	4	2
2	(Sweden) J Johansson	6	6

Second round
6	(Sweden) R Söderling	6	6^{2}	4
(Sweden) T Johansson	1	7^{7}	6
Q	(Czech Republic) M Tabara	3	6	3
3	(Romania) A Pavel	6	3	6
5	(Spain) F López	4	7^{7}	3
WC	(Sweden) M Ryderstedt	6	6^{4}	6
(United States) J-M Gambill	4	4
2	(Sweden) J Johansson	6	6

Quarterfinals
(Sweden) T Johansson	7^{7}	7
3	(Romania) A Pavel	6^{4}	5
WC	(Sweden) M Ryderstedt	3	5
2	(Sweden) J Johansson	6	3^{r}

Semifinals
(Sweden) T Johansson	6	6
WC	(Sweden) M Ryderstedt	3	2
