= 2004 ABN AMRO World Tennis Tournament – Singles =

Singles
- 2004 ABN AMRO World Tennis Tournament

Final
- Champion: (Australia) Lleyton Hewitt
- Runner-up: (Spain) Juan Carlos Ferrero
- Score: 6–7^{(1–7)}, 7–5, 6–4

Details
- Draw: 32 (4 Q / 3 WC )
- Seeds: 8

Events
Singles	Doubles
← 2003 ·	ABN AMRO World Tennis Tournament	· 2005 →

Max Mirnyi was the defending champion but lost in the semifinals to Juan Carlos Ferrero.

Lleyton Hewitt won in the final 6–7^{(1–7)}, 7–5, 6–4 against Ferrero.

== Seeds ==
A champion seed is indicated in bold text while text in italics indicates the round in which that seed was eliminated.

1. (Switzerland) Roger Federer (quarterfinals)
2. (Spain) Juan Carlos Ferrero (final)
3. (Germany) Rainer Schüttler (quarterfinals)
4. (Thailand) Paradorn Srichaphan (first round)
5. (United Kingdom) Tim Henman (semifinals)
6. (Australia) **Lleyton Hewitt (champion)**
7. (Netherlands) Sjeng Schalken (second round)
8. (Netherlands) Martin Verkerk (first round)

== Draw ==
=== Key ===
- Q = Qualifier
- WC = Wild card
- LL = Lucky loser
- Alt = Alternate
- SE = Special exempt
- PR = Protected ranking
- ITF = ITF entry
- JE = Junior exempt
- w/o = Walkover
- r = Retired
- d = Defaulted
- SR = Special ranking

First round
1	(Switzerland) **R Federer**	**6**	**6**
(France) A Clément	4	3
(Romania) **A Pavel**	4	**7^{9}**	**6**
(Russia) M Youzhny	**6**	6^{7}	2
(Sweden) J Björkman	6^{2}	6^{8}
Q	(Czech Republic) **T Cakl**	**7^{7}**	**7^{10}**
(Spain) T Robredo	5	2
5	(United Kingdom) **T Henman**	**7**	**6**
3	(Germany) **R Schüttler**	**6**	**6**
(Austria) S Koubek	3	2
(Belgium) O Rochus	**7**	2	2
(Czech Republic) **R Štěpánek**	5	**6**	**6**
Q	(France) T Ascione	3	1
(Sweden) **T Johansson**	**6**	**6**
(Chile) F González	2	1
6	(Australia) **L Hewitt**	**6**	**6**
8	(Netherlands) M Verkerk	6^{4}	**7^{7}**	4
(Finland) **J Nieminen**	**7^{7}**	6^{4}	**6**
(Spain) **A Costa**	**6**	3
Q	(Switzerland) I Heuberger	4	0^{r}
(Armenia) S Sargsian	**7^{7}**	6^{5}	1
(Belarus) **M Mirnyi**	6^{3}	**7^{7}**	**6**
(Russia) **N Davydenko**	**6**	**6**
4	(Thailand) P Srichaphan	4	3
7	(Netherlands) **S Schalken**	**6**	**6**
WC	(Croatia) G Ivanišević	3	2
WC	(Spain) À Corretja	4	2
(Netherlands) **R Sluiter**	**6**	**6**
WC	(Netherlands) **J van Lottum**	**6**	**7^{7}**
(Slovakia) K Kučera	2	6^{4}
Q	(Netherlands) D van Scheppingen	3	6^{5}
2	(Spain) **J C Ferrero**	**6**	**7^{7}**

Second round
1	(Switzerland) **R Federer**	**7^{7}**	**7**
(Romania) A Pavel	6^{2}	5
Q	(Czech Republic) T Cakl	2	4
5	(United Kingdom) **T Henman**	**6**	**6**
3	(Germany) **R Schüttler**	**6**	**6**
(Czech Republic) R Štěpánek	3	4
(Sweden) T Johansson	6^{6}	6^{3}
6	(Australia) **L Hewitt**	**7^{8}**	**7^{7}**
(Finland) **J Nieminen**	**6**	**6**
(Spain) A Costa	2	1
(Belarus) **M Mirnyi**	**7^{7}**	**7^{7}**
(Russia) N Davydenko	6^{3}	6^{1}
7	(Netherlands) S Schalken	3	4
(Netherlands) **R Sluiter**	**6**	**6**
WC	(Netherlands) J van Lottum	5	**7**	6^{5}
2	(Spain) **J C Ferrero**	**7**	5	**7^{7}**

Quarterfinals
1	(Switzerland) R Federer	3	6^{9}
5	(United Kingdom) **T Henman**	**6**	**7^{11}**
3	(Germany) R Schüttler	6^{5}	3
6	(Australia) **L Hewitt**	**7^{7}**	**6**
(Finland) J Nieminen	4	6^{3}
(Belarus) **M Mirnyi**	**6**	**7^{7}**
(Netherlands) R Sluiter	**6**	4	6^{10}
2	(Spain) **J C Ferrero**	1	**6**	**7^{12}**

Semifinals
5	(United Kingdom) T Henman	3	3
6	(Australia) **L Hewitt**	**6**	**6**
(Belarus) M Mirnyi	**7^{7}**	3	6^{4}
2	(Spain) **JC Ferrero**	6^{2}	**6**	**7^{7}**

Final
6	(Australia) **Lleyton Hewitt**	6^{1}	**7**	**6**
2	(Spain) J C Ferrero	**7^{7}**	5	4
