= 2004 Brasil Open – Singles =

Singles
- 2004 Brasil Open

Final
- Champion: (Brazil) Gustavo Kuerten
- Runner-up: (Argentina) Agustín Calleri
- Score: 3–6, 6–2, 6–3

Details
- Draw: 32
- Seeds: 8

Events
Singles	Doubles
← 2003 ·	Brasil Open	· 2005 →

Sjeng Schalken was the defending champion but did not compete that year.

Gustavo Kuerten won in the final 3–6, 6–2, 6–3 against Agustín Calleri.

== Seeds ==
1. (Spain) Carlos Moyá (first round)
2. (Chile) Nicolás Massú (first round)
3. (Brazil) Gustavo Kuerten (champion)
4. (Argentina) Agustín Calleri (final)
5. (Argentina) Mariano Zabaleta (first round)
6. (Spain) Félix Mantilla (first round)
7. (Argentina) Gastón Gaudio (second round)
8. (Argentina) Juan Ignacio Chela (quarterfinals)

== Draw ==
=== Key ===
- Q = Qualifier
- WC = Wild card
- LL = Lucky loser
- Alt = Alternate
- ITF = ITF entry
- PR = Protected ranking
- SR = Special ranking
- SE = Special exempt
- JE = Junior exempt
- JR = Junior Accelerator Programme entrant
- CO = College Accelerator Programme entrant
- NG = Next Gen Accelerator Program entrant
- w/o = Walkover
- r = Retired
- d = Defaulted

=== Finals ===
Semifinals
(Argentina) José Acasuso	4	3
3	(Brazil) Gustavo Kuerten	6	6
4	(Argentina) Agustín Calleri	6	5	6
(Peru) Luis Horna	4	7	1

Final
3	(Brazil) Gustavo Kuerten	3	6	6
4	(Argentina) Agustín Calleri	6	2	3

=== Top half ===
First round
1	(Spain) C Moyá	3	3
(Germany) T Behrend	6	6
(Israel) H Levy	4	6^{3}
(Spain) R Ramírez Hidalgo	6	7^{7}
(Belgium) C Rochus	3	4
(Argentina) J Acasuso	6	6
(Italy) F Volandri	6	6
6	(Spain) F Mantilla	2	2
3	(Brazil) G Kuerten	3	6	6
(Spain) Ó Hernández	6	2	3
(France) R Gasquet	6	7^{7}
WC	(Brazil) F Ferreiro	0	6^{5}
Q	(Argentina) F Squillari	6	7
Q	(France) J-R Lisnard	2	5
WC	(Brazil) R Mello	2	4
7	(Argentina) G Gaudio	6	6

Second round
(Germany) T Behrend	6	6
(Spain) R Ramírez Hidalgo	2	2
(Argentina) J Acasuso	7^{7}	6
(Italy) F Volandri	6^{4}	2
3	(Brazil) G Kuerten	7^{7}	6
(France) R Gasquet	6^{3}	3
Q	(Argentina) F Squillari	7^{7}	6
7	(Argentina) G Gaudio	6^{3}	3

Quarterfinals
(Germany) T Behrend	6	2	4
(Argentina) J Acasuso	0	6	6
3	(Brazil) G Kuerten	3	7	7
Q	(Argentina) F Squillari	6	5	5

Semifinals
(Argentina) J Acasuso	4	3
3	(Brazil) G Kuerten	6	6

=== Bottom half ===
First round
8	(Argentina) J I Chela	6	6
(Brazil) F Saretta	2	2
(Spain) D Ferrer	6	5
(Ecuador) N Lapentti	4	2^{r}
(Argentina) G Cañas	1	0^{r}
Q	(Spain) F Verdasco	6	1
(Spain) A Portas	1	3
4	(Argentina) A Calleri	6	6
5	(Argentina) M Zabaleta	4	1
(Spain) A Montañés	6	6
(Spain) D Sánchez	2	6^{4}
(Spain) G Blanco	6	7^{7}
WC	(Brazil) P Braga	3	2
(Peru) L Horna	6	6
Q	(Argentina) J Mónaco	6	6
2	(Chile) N Massú	4	2

Second round
8	(Argentina) J I Chela	6	6
(Spain) D Ferrer	2	4
Q	(Spain) F Verdasco	4	4
4	(Argentina) A Calleri	6	6
(Spain) A Montañés	2	6^{4}
(Spain) G Blanco	6	7^{7}
(Peru) L Horna	6	6
Q	(Argentina) J Mónaco	4	1

Quarterfinals
8	(Argentina) J I Chela	3	6	3
4	(Argentina) A Calleri	6	3	6
(Spain) G Blanco	1	6^{5}
(Peru) L Horna	6	7^{7}

Semifinals
4	(Argentina) A Calleri	6	5	6
(Peru) L Horna	4	7	1
