= 2004 Mercedes-Benz Cup – Doubles =

Doubles
- 2004 Mercedes-Benz Cup

Final
- Champions: (United States) Bob Bryan (United States) Mike Bryan
- Runners-up: (Australia) Wayne Arthurs (Australia) Paul Hanley
- Score: 6–3, 7–6^{(8–6)}

Details
- Draw: 16
- Seeds: 4

Events
Singles	Doubles
← 2003 ·	Los Angeles Open	· 2005 →

Jan-Michael Gambill and Travis Parrott were the defending champions, but Gambill did not participate this year. Parrott partnered Robby Ginepri, losing in the first round.

Bob Bryan and Mike Bryan won in the final 6–3, 7–6^{(8–6)}, against Wayne Arthurs and Paul Hanley.

== Seeds ==
1. (United States) Bob Bryan / (United States) Mike Bryan (champions)
2. (Australia) Wayne Arthurs / (Australia) Paul Hanley (final)
3. (Israel) Jonathan Erlich / (Israel) Andy Ram (semifinals)
4. (The Bahamas) Mark Merklein / (Argentina) Martín Rodríguez (first round)

== Draw ==
=== Key ===
- Q = Qualifier
- WC = Wild card
- LL = Lucky loser
- Alt = Alternate
- SE = Special exempt
- PR = Protected ranking
- ITF = ITF entry
- JE = Junior exempt
- w/o = Walkover
- r = Retired
- d = Defaulted
- SR = Special ranking

=== Draw ===
First round
1	(United States) B Bryan (United States) M Bryan	6	7^{7}
WC	(United States) A Bogomolov Jr. (United States) T Dent	2	6^{2}
(South Africa) R Koenig (Japan) T Shimada	3	6	6
(United States) M Fish (United States) J Morrison	6	4	3
3	(Israel) J Erlich (Israel) A Ram	6	7^{7}
(Australia) J Kerr (United States) J Thomas	3	6^{1}
(United States) R Leach (United States) B MacPhie	7^{7}	4	6
(United States) S Humphries (United States) G Oliver	6^{5}	6	3
WC	(South Korea) H-t Lee (United States) T Phillips	6^{2}	6
(Germany) T Haas (South Africa) G Weiner	7^{7}	2	r
(France) J Benneteau (France) G Carraz	3	6	7^{7}
4	(The Bahamas) M Merklein (Argentina) M Rodríguez	6	3	6^{4}
(United States) R Ginepri (United States) T Parrott	4	6	5
(Germany) N Kiefer (Thailand) P Srichaphan	6	4	7
(Slovakia) K Beck (Slovakia) D Hrbatý	7^{8}	4	4
2	(Australia) W Arthurs (Australia) P Hanley	6^{6}	6	6

Quarterfinals
1	(United States) B Bryan (United States) M Bryan	6	6^{6}	6
(South Africa) R Koenig (Japan) T Shimada	2	7^{8}	1
3	(Israel) J Erlich (Israel) A Ram	6	6
(United States) R Leach (United States) B MacPhie	2	3
WC	(South Korea) H-t Lee (United States) T Phillips	6	6
(France) J Benneteau (France) G Carraz	4	1
(Germany) N Kiefer (Thailand) P Srichaphan	7^{7}	3	4
2	(Australia) W Arthurs (Australia) P Hanley	6^{3}	6	6

Semifinals
1	(United States) B Bryan (United States) M Bryan	7^{7}	7
3	(Israel) J Erlich (Israel) A Ram	6^{4}	5
WC	(South Korea) H-t Lee (United States) T Phillips	6	1	6^{2}
2	(Australia) W Arthurs (Australia) P Hanley	4	6	7^{7}

Final
1	(United States) B Bryan (United States) M Bryan	6	7^{8}
2	(Australia) W Arthurs (Australia) P Hanley	3	6^{6}
