= 2004 ABN AMRO World Tennis Tournament – Doubles =

Doubles
- 2004 ABN AMRO World Tennis Tournament
- 2003 Champions: (Australia) Wayne Arthurs (Australia) Paul Hanley

Final
- Champions: (Australia) Paul Hanley (Czech Republic) Radek Štěpánek
- Runners-up: (Israel) Jonathan Erlich (Israel) Andy Ram
- Score: 5–7, 7–6^{(7–5)}, 7–5

Events
| Singles | Doubles |
| ← 2003 · | ABN AMRO World Tennis Tournament | · 2005 → |

Wayne Arthurs and Paul Hanley were the defending champions but only Hanley competed that year with Radek Štěpánek.

Hanley and Štěpánek won in the final 5–7, 7–6^{(7–5)}, 7–5 against Jonathan Erlich and Andy Ram.

== Seeds ==
Champion seeds are indicated in bold text while text in italics indicates the round in which those seeds were eliminated.

1. (India) Mahesh Bhupathi / (Belarus) Max Mirnyi (first round)
2. (Czech Republic) Martin Damm / (Czech Republic) Cyril Suk (semifinals)
3. (Zimbabwe) Wayne Black / (Zimbabwe) Kevin Ullyett (first round)
4. (United States) Jared Palmer / (Czech Republic) Pavel Vízner (quarterfinals)

== Draw ==
=== Key ===
- Q = Qualifier
- WC = Wild card
- LL = Lucky loser
- Alt = Alternate
- SE = Special exempt
- PR = Protected ranking
- ITF = ITF entry
- JE = Junior exempt
- w/o = Walkover
- r = Retired
- d = Defaulted
- SR = Special ranking

First round
1 | (India) M Bhupathi (Belarus) M Mirnyi | 6^{2} | 4
(Germany) **M Kohlmann** (Germany) **R Schüttler** | **7^{7}** | **6**
WC | (Netherlands) F Hemmes Jr. (Netherlands) D van Scheppingen | 3 | 4
(Israel) **J Erlich** (Israel) **A Ram** | **6** | **6**
3 | (Zimbabwe) W Black (Zimbabwe) K Ullyett | 3 | 4
(Spain) **À Corretja** (Spain) **A Costa** | **6** | **6**
(France) **A Clément** (Spain) **T Robredo** | **7^{7}** | **6**
(Finland) J Nieminen (Romania) A Pavel | 6^{3} | 1
(Australia) **P Hanley** (Czech Republic) **R Štěpánek** | **7^{7}** | **7^{7}**
(Czech Republic) T Cibulec (Czech Republic) P Pála | 6^{3} | 6^{4}
(Armenia) S Sargsian (Serbia and Montenegro) N Zimonjić | 6^{7} | **6** | 6^{5}
4 | (United States) **J Palmer** (Czech Republic) **P Vízner** | **7^{9}** | 4 | **7^{7}**
WC | (Australia) **L Hewitt** (Australia) **R Rasheed** | **6** | **6**
(Netherlands) R Sluiter (Netherlands) M Verkerk | 4 | 1
(Sweden) J Björkman (Sweden) T Johansson | 4 | 4
2 | (Czech Republic) **M Damm** (Czech Republic) **C Suk** | **6** | **6**

Quarterfinals
(Germany) M Kohlmann (Germany) R Schüttler | 3 | 6^{4}
(Israel) **J Erlich** (Israel) **A Ram** | **6** | **7^{7}**
(Spain) À Corretja (Spain) A Costa | 6^{7} | **6** | 3
(France) **A Clément** (Spain) **T Robredo** | **7^{9}** | 4 | **6**
(Australia) **P Hanley** (Czech Republic) **R Štěpánek** | **7^{7}** | **6**
4 | (United States) J Palmer (Czech Republic) P Vízner | 6^{3} | 2
WC | (Australia) L Hewitt (Australia) R Rasheed | 4 | 4
2 | (Czech Republic) **M Damm** (Czech Republic) **C Suk** | **6** | **6**

Semifinals
(Israel) **J Erlich** (Israel) **A Ram** | **6** | 3 | **6**
(France) A Clément (Spain) T Robredo | 3 | **6** | 4
(Australia) **P Hanley** (Czech Republic) **R Štěpánek** | **7^{7}** | 3 | **7**
2 | (Czech Republic) M Damm (Czech Republic) C Suk | 6^{5} | **6** | 5

Final
(Israel) Jonathan Erlich (Israel) Andy Ram | **7** | 6^{5} | 5
(Australia) **Paul Hanley** (Czech Republic) **Radek Štěpánek** | 5 | **7^{7}** | **7**
