= 2004 Dutch Open – Doubles =

Doubles
- 2004 Dutch Open

Final
- Champions: (Czech Republic) Jaroslav Levinský (Czech Republic) David Škoch
- Runners-up: (Argentina) José Acasuso (Peru) Luis Horna
- Score: 6–0, 2–6, 7–5

Events
| Singles | Doubles |
- Dutch Open

Devin Bowen and Ashley Fisher were the defending champions, but Bowen did not participate this year. Fisher partnered Stephen Huss, losing in the first round.

Jaroslav Levinský and David Škoch won in the final 6–0, 2–6, 7–5, against José Acasuso and Luis Horna.

== Seeds ==
1. (South Africa) Jeff Coetzee / (South Africa) Chris Haggard (semifinals)
2. (Spain) Álex López Morón / (Belgium) Tom Vanhoudt (first round)
3. (Czech Republic) Jaroslav Levinský / (Czech Republic) David Škoch (champions)
4. (Argentina) Federico Browne / (Netherlands) Rogier Wassen (first round)

== Draw ==
Key

- Q = Qualifier
- WC = Wild card
- LL = Lucky loser
- Alt = Alternate
- ITF = ITF entry
- PR = Protected ranking
- SR = Special ranking
- SE = Special exempt
- JE = Junior exempt
- JR = Junior Accelerator Programme entrant
- CO = College Accelerator Programme entrant
- NG = Next Gen Accelerator Program entrant
- w/o = Walkover
- r = Retired
- d = Defaulted

=== Draw ===
First round
1 | (South Africa) J Coetzee (South Africa) C Haggard | 4 | 6 | 6
(Spain) Ó Hernández (Spain) A Montañés | 6 | 1 | 2
(Belgium) C Rochus (Belgium) O Rochus | 6^{5} | 6^{3}
(Chile) A García (Chile) F González | 7^{7} | 7^{7}
3 | (Czech Republic) J Levinský (Czech Republic) D Škoch | 6 | 6
WC | (Netherlands) M van Gemerden (Netherlands) J van Lottum | 3 | 4
WC | (Netherlands) F Hemmes Jr. (Netherlands) D van Scheppingen | 6 | 6
(Italy) E Artoni (Spain) E Benfele Álvarez | 4 | 2
(Australia) A Fisher (Australia) S Huss | 1 | 4
(Netherlands) R Sluiter (Netherlands) M Verkerk | 6 | 6
(Spain) A Martín (Brazil) F Saretta | 7^{7} | 6
4 | (Argentina) F Browne (Netherlands) R Wassen | 6^{4} | 4
(Australia) M Hill (Sweden) J Landsberg | 5 | 6 | 3
(Chile) N Massú (Spain) A Portas | 7 | 3 | 6
(Argentina) J Acasuso (Peru) L Horna | 6 | 6
2 | (Spain) Á López Morón (Belgium) T Vanhoudt | 2 | 3

Quarterfinals
1 | (South Africa) J Coetzee (South Africa) C Haggard | w/o
(Chile) A García (Chile) F González
3 | (Czech Republic) J Levinský (Czech Republic) D Škoch | 6 | 6
WC | (Netherlands) F Hemmes Jr. (Netherlands) D van Scheppingen | 3 | 1
(Netherlands) R Sluiter (Netherlands) M Verkerk | 4 | 5
(Spain) A Martín (Brazil) F Saretta | 6 | 7
(Chile) N Massú (Spain) A Portas | 6 | 0 | 3
(Argentina) J Acasuso (Peru) L Horna | 4 | 6 | 6

Semifinals
1 | (South Africa) J Coetzee (South Africa) C Haggard | 1 | 4
3 | (Czech Republic) J Levinský (Czech Republic) D Škoch | 6 | 6
(Spain) A Martín (Brazil) F Saretta | 3 | 2
(Argentina) J Acasuso (Peru) L Horna | 6 | 6

Final
3 | (Czech Republic) J Levinský (Czech Republic) D Škoch | 6 | 2 | 7
(Argentina) J Acasuso (Peru) L Horna | 0 | 6 | 5
