= 2004 Allianz Suisse Open Gstaad – Doubles =

Doubles
- 2004 Allianz Suisse Open Gstaad

Final
- Champions: (India) Leander Paes (Czech Republic) David Rikl
- Runners-up: (Switzerland) Marc Rosset (Switzerland) Stan Wawrinka
- Score: 6–4, 6–2

Details
- Draw: 16
- Seeds: 4

Events
Singles	Doubles
- Swiss Open

Leander Paes and David Rikl were defending champions. Rikl was also the two-time defending champion, having won the title with Joshua Eagle in 2002.

Paes and Rikl defended their title, defeating wildcard entry Marc Rosset and Stan Wawrinka in the final, 6–4, 6–2.

== Seeds ==
Champion seeds are indicated in bold text while text in italics indicates the round in which those seeds were eliminated.

1. (India) **Leander Paes** / (Czech Republic) **David Rikl (champions)**
2. (Czech Republic) František Čermák / (Czech Republic) Leoš Friedl (quarterfinals)
3. (United States) Jared Palmer / (Czech Republic) Pavel Vízner (semifinals)
4. (Czech Republic) Tomáš Cibulec / (Czech Republic) Petr Pála (first round)

== Draw ==
Key

- Q = Qualifier
- WC = Wild card
- LL = Lucky loser
- Alt = Alternate
- ITF = ITF entry
- PR = Protected ranking
- SR = Special ranking
- SE = Special exempt
- JE = Junior exempt
- JR = Junior Accelerator Programme entrant
- CO = College Accelerator Programme entrant
- NG = Next Gen Accelerator Program entrant
- w/o = Walkover
- r = Retired
- d = Defaulted

First round
1	(India) **L Paes** (Czech Republic) **D Rikl**	**6**	**6**
(Argentina) L Arnold Ker (Argentina) M García	1	3
(Czech Republic) **J Novax** (Czech Republic) **R Štěpánek**	**6**	**6**
(Czech Republic) J Levinský (Czech Republic) D Škoch	1	4
3	(United States) **J Palmer** (Czech Republic) **P Vízner**	**6**	6^{4}	**7^{7}**
(Switzerland) Y Allegro (Germany) M Kohlmann	4	**7^{7}**	6^{5}
WC	(United States) G Bastl (Austria) S Koubek	4	4
(Spain) **A Montanes** (Spain) **A Portas**	**6**	**6**
Alt	(Spain) R Ramírez Hidalgo (Italy) P Starace	3	4
(Croatia) **I Karlović** (Germany) **R Wassen**	**6**	**6**
(Romania) **A Pavel** (Belgium) **T Vanhoudt**	**6**	**6**
4	(Czech Republic) T Cibulec (Czech Republic) P Pála	4	1
WC	(Switzerland) **M Rosset** (Switzerland) **S Wawrinka**	**6**	**7^{7}**
(Switzerland) I Heuberger (Germany) R Schüttler	3	6^{5}
(Argentina) J Acasuso (Russia) I Andreev	4	2
2	(Czech Republic) **F Čermák** (Czech Republic) **L Friedl**	**6**	**6**

Quarterfinals
1	(India) **L Paes** (Czech Republic) **D Rikl**	**7**	**6**
(Czech Republic) J Novax (Czech Republic) R Štěpánek	5	1
3	(United States) **J Palmer** (Czech Republic) **P Vízner**	w/o
(Spain) A Montanes (Spain) A Portas
(Croatia) I Karlović (Germany) R Wassen	3	4
(Romania) **A Pavel** (Belgium) **T Vanhoudt**	**6**	**6**
WC	(Switzerland) **M Rosset** (Switzerland) **S Wawrinka**	**6**	**7^{9}**
2	(Czech Republic) F Čermák (Czech Republic) L Friedl	3	6^{7}

Semifinals
1	(India) **L Paes** (Czech Republic) **D Rikl**	**6**	**6**
3	(United States) J Palmer (Czech Republic) P Vízner	4	4
(Romania) A Pavel (Belgium) T Vanhoudt	4	**7^{7}**	4
WC	(Switzerland) **M Rosset** (Switzerland) **S Wawrinka**	**6**	6^{2}	**6**

Final
1	(India) **L Paes** (Czech Republic) **D Rikl**	**6**	**6**
WC	(Switzerland) M Rosset (Switzerland) S Wawrinka	4	2
