= 2003 Tennis Masters Series =

Men's professional tennis tour

Details
- Duration: March 5 – November 2
- Edition: 14th
- Tournaments: 9

Achievements (singles)
- Most titles: (Spain) Juan Carlos Ferrero (United States) Andy Roddick (2)
- Most finals: (Argentina) Guillermo Coria (Spain) Juan Carlos Ferrero (United States) Andy Roddick (2)

The table below shows the 2003 Tennis Masters Series schedule.

The ATP Masters Series are part of the elite tour for professional men's tennis organised by the Association of Tennis Professionals.

== Results ==
* First-time champion

Masters	Singles champions	Runners-up	Score	Doubles champions	Runners-up	Score
Indian Wells Singles – Doubles	(Australia) Lleyton Hewitt	(Brazil) Gustavo Kuerten	6–1, 6–1	(South Africa) Wayne Ferreira (Russia) Yevgeny Kafelnikov	(United States) Bob Bryan (United States) Mike Bryan	6–1, 6–4
Miami Singles – Doubles	(United States) Andre Agassi	(Spain) Carlos Moyà	6–3, 6–3	(Switzerland) Roger Federer*	(India) Leander Paes (Czech Republic) David Rikl	7–5, 6–3
Miami Singles – Doubles	(United States) Andre Agassi	(Spain) Carlos Moyà	6–3, 6–3	(Belarus) Max Mirnyi	(India) Leander Paes (Czech Republic) David Rikl	7–5, 6–3
Monte Carlo Singles – Doubles	(Spain) Juan Carlos Ferrero	(Argentina) Guillermo Coria	6–2, 6–2	(India) Mahesh Bhupathi (Belarus) Max Mirnyi	(France) Michaël Llodra (France) Fabrice Santoro	4–6, 7–5, 6–2
Rome Singles – Doubles	(Spain) Félix Mantilla*	(Switzerland) Roger Federer	7–5, 6–2, 7–6^{(10–8)}	(Australia) Wayne Arthurs	(France) Michaël Llodra (France) Fabrice Santoro	7–5, 7–6
Rome Singles – Doubles	(Spain) Félix Mantilla*	(Switzerland) Roger Federer	7–5, 6–2, 7–6^{(10–8)}	(Australia) Paul Hanley*	(France) Michaël Llodra (France) Fabrice Santoro	7–5, 7–6
Hamburg Singles – Doubles	(Argentina) Guillermo Coria*	(Argentina) Agustín Calleri	6–3, 6–4, 6–4	(The Bahamas) Mark Knowles (Canada) Daniel Nestor	(India) Mahesh Bhupathi (Belarus) Max Mirnyi	6–4, 6–4
Montreal Singles – Doubles	(United States) Andy Roddick*	(Argentina) David Nalbandian	6–1, 6–3	(India) Mahesh Bhupathi (Belarus) Max Mirnyi	(Sweden) Jonas Björkman (Australia) Todd Woodbridge	6–3, 7–6^{(7–4)}
Cincinnati Singles – Doubles	(United States) Andy Roddick	(United States) Mardy Fish	4–6, 7–6^{(7–3)}, 7–6^{(7–4)}	(United States) Bob Bryan (United States) Mike Bryan	(Australia) Wayne Arthurs (Australia) Paul Hanley	7–6, 6–4
Madrid Singles – Doubles	(Spain) Juan Carlos Ferrero	(Chile) Nicolás Massú	6–3, 6–4, 6–3	(India) Mahesh Bhupathi (Belarus) Max Mirnyi	(Zimbabwe) Wayne Black (Zimbabwe) Kevin Ullyett	6–2, 2–6, 6–3
Paris Singles – Doubles	(United Kingdom) Tim Henman*	(Romania) Andrei Pavel	6–2, 7–6^{(8–6)}, 7–6^{(7–2)}	(Australia) Wayne Arthurs (Australia) Paul Hanley	(France) Michaël Llodra (France) Fabrice Santoro	6–3, 1–6, 6–3

== Titles Champions ==
=== Singles ===
#	Player	IN	MI	MO	HA	RO	CA	CI	ST	PA	#	Winning span
	(United States) Andre Agassi	1	6	-	-	1	3	2	1	2	16	1990–2003 (14)
	(United States) Pete Sampras	2	3	-	-	1	-	3	-	2	11	1992–2000 (9)
	(Austria) Thomas Muster	-	1	3	-	3	-	-	1	-	8	1990–1997 (8)
	(United States) Michael Chang	3	1	-	-	-	1	2	-	-	7	1990–1997 (8)
	(United States) Jim Courier	2	1	-	-	2	-	-	-	-	5	1991–1993 (3)
	(Germany) Boris Becker	-	-	-	-	-	-	-	4	1	5	1990–1996 (7)
	(Brazil) Gustavo Kuerten	-	-	2	1	1	-	1	-	-	5	1999–2001 (3)
	(Chile) Marcelo Ríos	1	1	1	1	1	-	-	-	-	5	1997–1999 (3)
	(Sweden) Stefan Edberg	1	-	-	1	-	-	1	-	1	4	1990–1992 (3)
	(Spain) Juan Carlos Ferrero	-	-	2	-	1	-	1	-	-	4	2001–2003 (3)
	(Ukraine) Andrei Medvedev	-	-	1	3	-	-	-	-	-	4	1994–1997 (4)
	(Sweden) Thomas Enqvist	-	-	-	-	-	-	1	1	1	3	1996–2000 (5)
	(Russia) Marat Safin	-	-	-	-	-	1	-	-	2	3	2000–2002 (3)
	(Spain) Sergi Bruguera	-	-	2	-	-	-	-	-	-	2	1991–1993 (3)
	(Russia) Andrei Chesnokov	-	-	1	-	-	1	-	-	-	2	1990–1991 (2)
	(Spain) Àlex Corretja	1	-	-	-	1	-	-	-	-	2	1997–2000 (4)
	(South Africa) Wayne Ferreira	-	-	-	-	-	1	-	1	-	2	1996–2000 (5)
	(France) Guy Forget	-	-	-	-	-	-	1	-	1	2	1991
	(Australia) Lleyton Hewitt	2	-	-	-	-	-	-	-	-	2	2002–2003 (2)
	(Croatia) Goran Ivanišević	-	-	-	-	-	-	-	1	1	2	1992–1993 (2)
	(Netherlands) Richard Krajicek	-	1	-	-	-	-	-	1	-	2	1998–1999 (2)
	(Spain) Carlos Moyá	-	-	1	-	-	-	1	-	-	2	1998–2002 (5)
	(Australia) Patrick Rafter	-	-	-	-	-	1	1	-	-	2	1998
	(United States) Andy Roddick	-	-	-	-	-	1	1	-	-	2	2003
	(Germany) Michael Stich	-	-	-	1	-	-	-	1	-	2	1993
	(Spain) Juan Aguilera	-	-	-	1	-	-	-	-	-	1	1990
	(Argentina) Guillermo Cañas	-	-	-	-	-	1	-	-	-	1	2002
	(Argentina) Guillermo Coria	-	-	-	1	-	-	-	-	-	1	2003
	(Spain) Albert Costa	-	-	-	1	-	-	-	-	-	1	1998
	(Spain) Roberto Carretero	-	-	-	1	-	-	-	-	-	1	1996
	(Switzerland) Roger Federer	-	-	-	1	-	-	-	-	-	1	2002
	(France) Sébastien Grosjean	-	-	-	-	-	-	-	-	1	1	2001
	(Germany) Tommy Haas	-	-	-	-	-	-	-	1	-	1	2001
	(United Kingdom) Tim Henman	-	-	-	-	-	-	-	-	1	1	2003
	(Sweden) Thomas Johansson	-	-	-	-	-	1	-	-	-	1	1999
	(Czech Republic) Petr Korda	-	-	-	-	-	-	-	1	-	1	1997
	(Spain) Felix Mantilla	-	-	-	-	1	-	-	-	-	1	2003
	(Sweden) Magnus Norman	-	-	-	-	1	-	-	-	-	1	2000
	(Czech Republic) Karel Nováček	-	-	-	1	-	-	-	-	-	1	1991
	(Romania) Andrei Pavel	-	-	-	-	-	1	-	-	-	1	2001
	(Sweden) Mikael Pernfors	-	-	-	-	-	1	-	-	-	1	1993
	(Australia) Mark Philippoussis	1	-	-	-	-	-	-	-	-	1	1999
	(France) Cédric Pioline	-	-	1	-	-	-	-	-	-	1	2000
	(Spain) Albert Portas	-	-	-	-	1	-	-	-	-	1	2001
	(United Kingdom) Greg Rusedski	-	-	-	-	-	-	-	-	1	1	1998
	(Spain) Emilio Sánchez	-	-	-	-	1	-	-	-	-	1	1991
	(United States) Chris Woodruff	-	-	-	-	-	1	-	-	-	1	1997
#	Player	IN	MI	MO	HA	RO	CA	CI	ST	PA	#	Winning span

== See also ==
- ATP Tour Masters 1000
- 2003 ATP Tour
- 2003 WTA Tier I Series
- 2003 WTA Tour
