= 2003 Tennis Masters Cup =

- Date: November 8–16
- Edition: 34th (singles) / 29th (doubles)
- Category: ATP Finals
- Draw: 8S / 8D
- Prize money: $3,700,000
- Surface: Hard / outdoor
- Location: Houston, United States
- Venue: Westside Tennis Club

Champions

Singles
- (Switzerland) Roger Federer

Doubles
- (United States) Bob Bryan / (United States) Mike Bryan
- ATP Finals

The 2003 Tennis Masters Cup was a men's tennis tournament played on outdoor hard courts. It was the 34th edition of the year-end singles championships and the 29th edition of the year-end doubles championships, and was part of the 2003 ATP Tour. It took place at the Westside Tennis Club in Houston, Texas in the United States from November 8 through November 16, 2003.

== Finals ==
=== Singles ===
(Switzerland) Roger Federer defeated (United States) Andre Agassi 6–3, 6–0, 6–4

- It was Federer's 9th title of the year and the 17th of his career. It was his 1st career year-end championships title.

=== Doubles ===
(United States) Bob Bryan / (United States) Mike Bryan defeated (France) Michaël Llodra / (France) Fabrice Santoro 6–7^{(6–8)}, 6–3, 3–6, 7–6^{(7–3)}, 6–4

- It was Bob Bryan's 5th title of the year and the 14th of his career. It was Mike Bryan's 5th title of the year and the 16th of his career.

== Points breakdown ==
=== Singles ===
Seed	Rank	Player	Grand Slam				ATP World Tour Masters 1000									Best Other					Total points	Tourn
Seed	Rank	Player	AUS	FRA	WIM	USO	IW	MIA	MC	ROM	HAM	CAN	CIN	MAD	PAR	1	2	3	4	5	Total points	Tourn
1	1	(United States) Andy Roddick	SF; 90	R128; 1	SF; 90	W 200	QF; 25	R32; 7	R64; 1	R32; 7	R32; 7	W 100	W 100	R16; 15	SF; 45	W 45	W 40	W 35	F 35	F 24	867	22
2	2	(Spain) Juan Carlos Ferrero	QF; 50	W 200	R16; 30	F 140	R64; 1	R32; 7	W 100	SF; 45	W 100	R16; 15	R32; 7	R16; 15	A 0	W 35	SF; 27	F 24	F 24	SF; 22	842	19
3	3	(Switzerland) Roger Federer	R16; 30	R128; 1	W 200	R16; 30	R64; 1	QF; 25	A 0	R16; 15	F 70	SF; 45	R32; 7	SF; 45	QF; 25	W 60	W 50	W 45	W 35	W 35	725	23
4	4	(Argentina) Guillermo Coria	R16; 30	SF; 90	R128; 1	QF; 50	R16; 15	R16; 15	F 70	R16; 15	W 100	R64; 1	QF; 25	A 0	R16; 15	W 60	W 50	W 50	W 35	F 24	646	21
5	5	(United States) Andre Agassi	W 200	QF; 50	R16; 30	SF; 90	A 0	W 100	A 0	R64; 1	A 0	QF; 25	A 0	A 0	A 0	W 35	W 35	SF; 20	SF; 18	R32; 1	605	18
6	6	(Germany) Rainer Schüttler	F 140	R16; 30	R16; 30	R16; 30	SF; 45	R64; 1	R32; 7	QF; 25	R16; 15	SF; 45	SF; 45	R32; 7	QF; 25	W 50	W 45	F 24	SF; 22	SF; 15	601	27
7	7	(Spain) Carlos Moyá	R64; 7	QF; 50	A 0	R16; 30	R16; 15	F 70	SF; 45	R16; 15	R32; 7	R64; 1	R64; 1	R16; 15	A 0	W 60	W 35	W 35	F 35	SF; 15	436	23
8	8	(Argentina) David Nalbandian	QF; 50	R64; 7	R16; 30	SF; 90	R64; 1	R32; 7	R32; 7	R64; 1	SF; 45	F 70	QF; 25	A 0	A 0	F 35	QF; 8	QF; 8	R16; 5	R16; 3	392	20

=== Doubles ===
Rk	Name	1	2	3	4	5	6	7	8	9	10	11	12	13	14	Total	Tour
1	(United States) Bob Bryan (United States) Mike Bryan	W 200	F 140	W 100	F 70	W 60	QF; 50	SF; 45	SF; 45	SF; 45	W 35	F 35	R16; 30	QF; 25	SF; 22	882	25
2	(India) Mahesh Bhupathi (Belarus) Max Mirnyi	F 140	W 100	W 100	W 100	F 70	W 50	QF; 50	QF; 50	SF; 45	SF; 45	W 35	F 35	F 31	SF; 27	878	15
3	(Sweden) Jonas Björkman (Australia) Todd Woodbridge	W 200	W 200	F 70	SF; 45	SF; 45	W 45	W 40	SF; 27	QF; 25	QF; 25	QF; 25	QF; 25	SF; 22	R32; 15	809	17
4	(The Bahamas) Mark Knowles (Canada) Daniel Nestor	F 140	W 100	SF; 90	W 50	W 50	W 50	QF; 50	W 45	SF; 45	W 35	F 35	R16; 30	QF; 25	QF; 25	770	22
5	(Australia) Wayne Arthurs (Australia) Paul Hanley	W 100	W 100	SF; 90	F 70	W 50	QF; 50	QF; 50	W 35	F 28	QF; 25	QF; 25	QF; 25	SF; 15	QF; 12	675	24
6	(France) Michaël Llodra (France) Fabrice Santoro	W 200	SF; 90	F 70	F 70	F 70	R16; 30	R16; 30	QF; 25	QF; 25	F 24	SF; 20	R32; 0			654	12
—	(India) Leander Paes (Czech Republic) David Rikl	SF; 90	SF; 90	F 70	W 60	QF; 50	SF; 45	SF; 45	W 35	QF; 25	QF; 8	R16; 0	R16; 0	R16; 0	R16; 0	518	15
7	(Czech Republic) Martin Damm (Czech Republic) Cyril Suk	W 50	W 50	QF; 50	QF; 50	SF; 45	SF; 45	W 35	F 31	R16; 30	QF; 25	QF; 25	QF; 25	QF; 25	QF; 25	511	26
8	(Argentina) Gastón Etlis (Argentina) Martín Rodríguez	SF; 90	QF; 50	R16; 30	SF; 27	QF; 25	QF; 25	SF; 22	SF; 22	SF; 18	SF; 15	R16; 15	R16; 15	QF; 10	QF; 8	372	26
