= 2003 WTA Tier I Series =

Women's professional tennis tour

Details
- Duration: January 27 – October 29
- Edition: 14th
- Tournaments: 9

Achievements (singles)
- Most titles: (Belgium) Justine Henin (4)
- Most finals: (Belgium) Justine Henin (4)

The WTA Tier I events are part of the elite tour for professional women's tennis organised by the WTA called the WTA Tour.

== Tournaments ==
Tournament	Country	Location	Surface	Date	Prize money
Toray Pan Pacific Open	Japan	Tokyo	Carpet (i)	Jan 27 – Feb 2	$1,300,000
Pacific Life Open	United States	Indian Wells	Hard	Mar 3 – 16	$2,100,000
NASDAQ-100 Open	United States	Key Biscayne	Hard	Mar 17 – 30	$2,960,000
Family Circle Cup	United States	Charleston	Clay (green)	Apr 7 – 13	$1,300,000
MasterCard German Open	Germany	Berlin	Clay	May 5 – 11	$1,224,000
Telecom Italia Masters	Italy	Rome	Clay	May 12 – 18	$1,300,000
Rogers AT&T Cup	Canada	Toronto	Hard	Aug 11 – 17	$1,325,000
Ladies Kremlin Cup	Russia	Moscow	Carpet (i)	Sep 29 – Oct 5	$1,300,000
Swisscom Challenge	Switzerland	Zürich	Hard (i)	Oct 13 – 19	$1,300,000

== Results ==
* First-time champion

Tournament	Singles champions	Runners-up	Score	Doubles champions	Runners-up	Score
Tokyo Singles – Doubles	(United States) Lindsay Davenport	(United States) Monica Seles	6–7^{(6–8)}, 6–1, 6–2	(Russia) Elena Bovina (Australia) Rennae Stubbs	(United States) Lindsay Davenport (United States) Lisa Raymond	6–3, 6–4
Indian Wells Singles – Doubles	(Belgium) Kim Clijsters*	(United States) Lindsay Davenport	6–4, 7–5	(United States) Lindsay Davenport (United States) Lisa Raymond	(Belgium) Kim Clijsters (Japan) Ai Sugiyama	2–6, 6–2, 7–6^{(7–5)}
Miami Singles – Doubles	(United States) Serena Williams	(United States) Jennifer Capriati	4–6, 6–4, 6–1	(South Africa) Liezel Huber* (Bulgaria) Magdalena Maleeva*	(Japan) Shinobu Asagoe (Japan) Nana Miyagi	6–4, 3–6, 7–5
Charleston Singles – Doubles	(Belgium) Justine Henin	(United States) Serena Williams	7–6^{(7–5)}, 6–4	(Spain) Virginia Ruano Pascual (Argentina) Paola Suárez	(Slovakia) Janette Husárová (Spain) Conchita Martínez	6–0, 6–3
Berlin Singles – Doubles	(Belgium) Justine Henin (2)	(Belgium) Kim Clijsters	6–4, 4–6, 7–5	(Spain) Virginia Ruano Pascual (2) (Argentina) Paola Suárez (2)	(Belgium) Kim Clijsters (Japan) Ai Sugiyama	6–3, 4–6, 6–4
Rome Singles – Doubles	(Belgium) Kim Clijsters (2)	(France) Amélie Mauresmo	3–6, 7–6^{(7–3)}, 6–0	(Russia) Svetlana Kuznetsova*	(Federal Republic of Yugoslavia) Jelena Dokić (Russia) Nadia Petrova	6–4, 5–7, 6–2
Rome Singles – Doubles	(Belgium) Kim Clijsters (2)	(France) Amélie Mauresmo	3–6, 7–6^{(7–3)}, 6–0	(United States) Martina Navratilova	(Federal Republic of Yugoslavia) Jelena Dokić (Russia) Nadia Petrova	6–4, 5–7, 6–2
Toronto Singles – Doubles	(Belgium) Justine Henin (3)	(Russia) Lina Krasnoroutskaya	6–1, 6–0	(Russia) Svetlana Kuznetsova (2) (United States) Martina Navratilova (2)	(Venezuela) María Vento-Kabchi (Indonesia) Angelique Widjaja	3–6, 6–1, 6–1
Moscow Singles – Doubles	(Russia) Anastasia Myskina*	(France) Amélie Mauresmo	6–2, 6–4	(Russia) Nadia Petrova*	(Russia) Anastasia Myskina (Russia) Vera Zvonareva	6–3, 6–4
Moscow Singles – Doubles	(Russia) Anastasia Myskina*	(France) Amélie Mauresmo	6–2, 6–4	(United States) Meghann Shaughnessy	(Russia) Anastasia Myskina (Russia) Vera Zvonareva	6–3, 6–4
Zürich Singles – Doubles	(Belgium) Justine Henin (4)	(Serbia and Montenegro) Jelena Dokić	6–0, 6–4	(Belgium) Kim Clijsters*	(Spain) Virginia Ruano Pascual (Argentina) Paola Suárez	7–6^{(7–3)}, 6–2
Zürich Singles – Doubles	(Belgium) Justine Henin (4)	(Serbia and Montenegro) Jelena Dokić	6–0, 6–4	(Japan) Ai Sugiyama	(Spain) Virginia Ruano Pascual (Argentina) Paola Suárez	7–6^{(7–3)}, 6–2

== See also ==
- WTA Tier I events
- 2003 WTA Tour
- 2003 Tennis Masters Series
- 2003 ATP Tour
