= 2003 Hamburg Masters =

- Date: 12–18 May
- Edition: 97th
- Category: Tennis Masters Series
- Draw: 64S / 22D
- Prize money: $2,200,000
- Surface: Clay / outdoor
- Location: Hamburg, Germany
- Venue: Rothenbaum Tennis Center

Champions

Singles
- (Argentina) Guillermo Coria

Doubles
- (The Bahamas) Mark Knowles / (Canada) Daniel Nestor
← 2002 ·	Hamburg Masters	· 2004 →

The 2003 Hamburg Masters was a men's tennis tournament played on outdoor clay courts. It was the 97th edition of the Hamburg Masters and was part of the Tennis Masters Series of the 2003 ATP Tour. It took place at the Am Rothenbaum in Hamburg, Germany from 12 May through 18 May 2003.

The singles field was headlined by new ATP No. 1, Scottsdale, Indian Wells winner and Masters Cup defending champion Lleyton Hewitt, Buenos Aires, Barcelona champion, Miami runner-up and Monte Carlo semifinalist Carlos Moyá and Marseille, Dubai, Munich winner and recent Rome finalist Roger Federer. Other top seeds competing were Memphis and Houston finalist Andy Roddick, 2002 French Open champion Albert Costa, Jiří Novák, Paradorn Srichaphan and David Nalbandian. Young Rafael Nadal at 16 defeated world number 4 Moya in 2 sets.

For the first time in a Tennis Masters Series tournament all four semifinalists were from the same country. The Argentine semifinalists were Guillermo Coria, Agustín Calleri, Gastón Gaudio and David Nalbandian.

== Finals ==
=== Singles ===
(Argentina) Guillermo Coria defeated (Argentina) Agustín Calleri 6–3, 6–4, 6–4

- It was Coria's 1st title of the year and the 2nd of his career. It was his 1st Masters title of the year and his 1st overall.

=== Doubles ===
(The Bahamas) Mark Knowles / (Canada) Daniel Nestor defeated (India) Mahesh Bhupathi / (Belarus) Max Mirnyi 6–4, 7–6^{(12–10)}

- It was Knowles' 4th title of the year and the 28th of his career. It was Nestor's 4th title of the year and the 30th of his career.
