= 2003 Stella Artois Championships – Singles =

Singles
- 2003 Stella Artois Championships

Final
- Champion: (United States) Andy Roddick
- Runner-up: (France) Sébastien Grosjean
- Score: 6–3, 6–3

Details
- Draw: 56
- Seeds: 16

Events
Singles	Doubles
← 2002 ·	Queen's Club Championships	· 2004 →

Lleyton Hewitt was the three-time defending champion but lost in the quarterfinals to Sébastien Grosjean.

Andy Roddick won in the final 6–3, 6–3 against Grosjean.

== Seeds ==
The top eight seeds received a bye to the second round.

1. (Australia) Lleyton Hewitt (quarterfinals)
2. (United States) Andre Agassi (semifinals)
3. (United States) Andy Roddick (champion)
4. (Thailand) Paradorn Srichaphan (second round)
5. (Netherlands) Sjeng Schalken (third round)
6. (France) Sébastien Grosjean (final)
7. (United Kingdom) Tim Henman (semifinals)
8. (Belgium) Xavier Malisse (quarterfinals)
9. (Finland) Jarkko Nieminen (second round)
10. (United States) Jan-Michael Gambill (second round)
11. (United States) Taylor Dent (quarterfinals)
12. (Belarus) Max Mirnyi (second round)
13. (United States) Mardy Fish (first round)
14. (Australia) Mark Philippoussis (first round)
15. (United States) Robby Ginepri (first round)
16. (Australia) Wayne Arthurs (first round)

== Draw ==
=== Key ===
- Q = Qualifier
- WC = Wild card
- LL = Lucky loser
- Alt = Alternate
- SE = Special exempt
- PR = Protected ranking
- ITF = ITF entry
- JE = Junior exempt
- w/o = Walkover
- r = Retired
- d = Defaulted
- SR = Special ranking

=== Finals ===
Semifinals
WC/6	(France) Sébastien Grosjean	6	6
7	(United Kingdom) Tim Henman	3	4
3	(United States) Andy Roddick	6	6^{5}	7^{8}
WC/2	(United States) Andre Agassi	1	7^{7}	6^{6}

Final
WC/6	(France) Sébastien Grosjean	3	3
3	(United States) Andy Roddick	6	6

=== Top half ===
==== Section 1 ====
First round
(Netherlands) R Sluiter	7^{7}	6
(Romania) A Voinea	6^{3}	3
Q	(Belgium) G Elseneer	2	6^{1}
(Brazil) A Sá	6	7^{7}
(Belgium) D Norman	7^{7}	7^{7}
13	(United States) M Fish	6^{5}	6^{3}
10	(United States) J-M Gambill	7^{7}	7^{7}
(Sweden) T Enqvist	6^{5}	6^{5}
LL	(France) N Mahut	3	5
Q	(Australia) T Reid	6	7
(France) G Carraz	3	5
(Switzerland) M Kratochvil	6	7

Second round
1	(Australia) L Hewitt	7^{8}	3	7^{7}
(Netherlands) R Sluiter	6^{6}	6	6^{5}
(Brazil) A Sá	3	6^{7}
(Belgium) D Norman	6	7^{9}
10	(United States) J-M Gambill	1	5
Q	(Australia) T Reid	6	7
(Switzerland) M Kratochvil	3	4
WC/6	(France) S Grosjean	6	6

Third round
1	(Australia) L Hewitt	7^{7}	3	6
(Belgium) D Norman	6^{4}	6	4
Q	(Australia) T Reid	1	4
WC/6	(France) S Grosjean	6	6

Quarterfinals
1	(Australia) L Hewitt	3	4
WC/6	(France) S Grosjean	6	6

==== Section 2 ====
First round
(Austria) J Knowle	2	1
(Croatia) M Ančić	6	6
WC	(United Kingdom) A Bogdanovic	6^{3}	6	7^{7}
Q	(United Kingdom) A Parmar	7^{7}	4	6^{2}
(France) A Dupuis	6	7^{10}
16	(Australia) W Arthurs	4	6^{8}
12	(Belarus) M Mirnyi	6	6
Q	(Switzerland) G Bastl	3	4
(France) C Saulnier	6	6
(Australia) S Draper	4	4
(Italy) D Sanguinetti	7^{7}	7^{7}
(Germany) A Waske	6^{5}	6^{1}

Second round
4	(Thailand) P Srichaphan	3	3
(Croatia) M Ančić	6	6
WC	(United Kingdom) A Bogdanovic	6	6^{6}	6^{5}
(France) A Dupuis	3	7^{8}	7^{7}
12	(Belarus) M Mirnyi	6^{2}	4
(France) C Saulnier	7^{7}	6
(Italy) D Sanguinetti	6	3	6^{3}
7	(United Kingdom) T Henman	3	6	7^{7}

Third round
(Croatia) M Ančić	6^{3}	6^{6}
(France) A Dupuis	7^{7}	7^{8}
(France) C Saulnier	7^{7}	3	3
7	(United Kingdom) T Henman	6^{5}	6	6

Quarterfinals
(France) A Dupuis	1	4
7	(United Kingdom) T Henman	6	6

=== Bottom half ===
==== Section 3 ====
First round
(Brazil) R Mello	2	1
(United States) T Martin	6	6
(United States) C Mamiit	6	4	6
(France) O Mutis	4	6	3
(United States) R Kendrick	2	5
11	(United States) T Dent	6	7
15	(United States) R Ginepri	6^{5}	6	0
(United Kingdom) G Rusedski	7^{7}	3	6
(Russia) A Stoliarov	6^{2}	6	3
(Morocco) H Arazi	7^{7}	3	6
Q	(Czech Republic) P Luxa	3	4
Q	(South Africa) R de Voest	6	6

Second round
5	(Netherlands) S Schalken	w/o
(United States) T Martin
(United States) C Mamiit	4	4
11	(United States) T Dent	6	6
(United Kingdom) G Rusedski	6	6
(Morocco) H Arazi	4	4
Q	(South Africa) R de Voest	3	2
3	(United States) A Roddick	6	6

Third round
5	(Netherlands) S Schalken	6^{6}	4
11	(United States) T Dent	7^{8}	6
(United Kingdom) G Rusedski	3	6	4
3	(United States) A Roddick	6	4	6

Quarterfinals
11	(United States) T Dent	3	6^{3}
3	(United States) A Roddick	6	7^{7}

==== Section 4 ====
First round
Q	(Croatia) I Karlović	7^{7}	4	7^{7}
(United States) J Gimelstob	6^{4}	6	6^{3}
(Netherlands) J van Lottum	6^{3}	5
(Switzerland) M Rosset	7^{7}	7
(Slovakia) K Beck	2	1
9	(Finland) J Nieminen	6	6
14	(Australia) M Philippoussis	6^{4}	3
WC	(Netherlands) R Krajicek	7^{7}	6
WC	(Croatia) G Ivanišević	2	2
(Czech Republic) J Vacek	6	6
(Belarus) V Voltchkov	3	6	2
(Australia) P Luczak	6	4	6

Second round
8	(Belgium) X Malisse	6	7^{7}
Q	(Croatia) I Karlović	3	6^{3}
(Switzerland) M Rosset	7	7
9	(Finland) J Nieminen	5	5
WC	(Netherlands) R Krajicek	7	2	6
(Czech Republic) J Vacek	5	6	3
(Australia) P Luczak	6^{5}	4
WC/2	(United States) A Agassi	7^{7}	6

Third round
8	(Belgium) X Malisse	7^{7}	7
(Switzerland) M Rosset	6^{4}	5
WC	(Netherlands) R Krajicek	1	2
WC/2	(United States) A Agassi	6	6

Quarterfinals
8	(Belgium) X Malisse	4	5
WC/2	(United States) A Agassi	6	7
