= 2003 Davidoff Swiss Indoors – Singles =

Singles
- 2003 Davidoff Swiss Indoors

Final
- Champion: (Argentina) Guillermo Coria
- Runner-up: (Argentina) David Nalbandian
- Score: W/O

Details
- Draw: 32 (3 Q / 4 WC )
- Seeds: 8

Events
Singles	Doubles
- Swiss Indoors

David Nalbandian was the defending champion but lost the final on a walkover against Guillermo Coria.

== Seeds ==
A champion seed is indicated in bold text while text in italics indicates the round in which that seed was eliminated.

1. (United States) Andy Roddick (semifinals)
2. (Switzerland) Roger Federer (second round)
3. (Argentina) **Guillermo Coria (champion)**
4. (Argentina) David Nalbandian (final, withdrew because of a left wrist injury)
5. (Czech Republic) Jiří Novák (second round)
6. (Australia) ~~Mark Philippoussis~~ (withdrew)
7. (Netherlands) Martin Verkerk (first round)
8. (Spain) Tommy Robredo (second round)

== Draw ==
Key

- Q = Qualifier
- WC = Wild card
- LL = Lucky loser
- Alt = Alternate
- ITF = ITF entry
- PR = Protected ranking
- SR = Special ranking
- SE = Special exempt
- JE = Junior exempt
- JR = Junior Accelerator Programme entrant
- CO = College Accelerator Programme entrant
- NG = Next Gen Accelerator Program entrant
- w/o = Walkover
- r = Retired
- d = Defaulted
- NB: The Final was the best of 5 sets while all other rounds were the best of 3 sets.

=== Final ===
Final
4	(Argentina) David Nalbandian
3	(Argentina) **Guillermo Coria**	w/o

=== Section 1 ===
First round
1	(United States) **A Roddick**	**6**	**7^{7}**
WC	(Switzerland) J-C Scherrer	3	6^{4}
(South Korea) H-T Lee	2	0
Q	(Belgium) **G Elseneer**	**6**	**6**
(Belgium) **O Rochus**	6^{4}	**6**	**7^{12}**
(Spain) F Mantilla	**7^{7}**	2	6^{10}
WC	(Switzerland) M Kratochvil	4	4
8	(Spain) **T Robredo**	**6**	**6**
4	(Argentina) **D Nalbandian**	**6**	**6**
(Spain) R Ramírez Hidalgo	4	0
(France) **A Clément**	**6**	**7^{7}**
(France) P-H Mathieu	4	6^{4}
LL	(Czech Republic) **T Zíb**	**7^{7}**	**7^{7}**
WC	(Switzerland) S Wawrinka	6^{0}	6^{5}
(United Kingdom) **T Henman**	**6**	**6**
7	(Netherlands) M Verkerk	2	3

Second round
1	(United States) **A Roddick**	**6**	**7^{7}**
Q	(Belgium) G Elseneer	3	6^{5}
(Belgium) **O Rochus**	**7**	**6**
8	(Spain) T Robredo	5	1
4	(Argentina) **D Nalbandian**	4
(France) A Clément	1^{r}
LL	(Czech Republic) T Zíb	3	4
(United Kingdom) **T Henman**	**6**	**6**

Quarterfinals
1	(United States) **A Roddick**	**6**	**6**
(Belgium) O Rochus	4	4
4	(Argentina) **D Nalbandian**	**6**	**6**
(United Kingdom) T Henman	2	4

Semifinals
1	(United States) A Roddick	5	5
4	(Argentina) **D Nalbandian**	**7**	**7**

=== Section 2 ===
First round
5	(Czech Republic) **J Novák**	3	**6**	**6**
Q	(United Kingdom) A Parmar	**6**	3	0
(Spain) R Nadal	**6**	3	6^{4}
(Spain) **F López**	3	**6**	**7^{7}**
Q	(France) **M Llodra**	**6**	**6**
(Czech Republic) B Ulihrach	3	4
(France) F Santoro	**7**	3	0
3	(Argentina) **G Coria**	5	**6**	**6**
LL	(Switzerland) I Heuberger	3	**6**	5
(Ecuador) **N Lapentti**	**6**	4	**7**
(Germany) **T Behrend**	1	**6**	**6**
(United States) J Blake	**6**	3	4
(Italy) F Volandri	3	**6**	2
(Croatia) **I Ljubičić**	**6**	3	**6**
WC	(Switzerland) M Rosset	1	3
2	(Switzerland) **R Federer**	**6**	**6**

Second round
5	(Czech Republic) J Novák	**6**	5	4
(Spain) **F López**	3	**7**	**6**
Q	(France) M Llodra	2	**7^{7}**	6^{4}
3	(Argentina) **G Coria**	**6**	6^{5}	**7^{7}**
(Ecuador) **N Lapentti**	**7^{7}**	**6**
(Germany) T Behrend	6^{2}	1
(Croatia) **I Ljubičić**	**7^{7}**	6^{5}	**6**
2	(Switzerland) R Federer	6^{5}	**7^{7}**	4

Quarterfinals
(Spain) F López	1	2
3	(Argentina) **G Coria**	**6**	**6**
(Ecuador) N Lapentti	**6**	2	3
(Croatia) **I Ljubičić**	2	**6**	**6**

Semifinals
3	(Argentina) **G Coria**	**6**	**6**
(Croatia) I Ljubičić	4	4
