= 2003 Davidoff Swiss Indoors – Doubles =

Doubles
- 2003 Davidoff Swiss Indoors

Final
- Champions: (The Bahamas) Mark Knowles (Canada) Daniel Nestor
- Runners-up: (Argentina) Lucas Arnold (Argentina) Mariano Hood
- Score: 6–4, 6–2

Details
- Draw: 16
- Seeds: 4

Events
Singles	Doubles
← 2002 ·	Swiss Indoors	· 2004 →

Bob Bryan and Mike Bryan were the defending champions but lost in the first round to James Blake and Martin Verkerk.

Mark Knowles and Daniel Nestor won in the final 6–4, 6–2 against Lucas Arnold and Mariano Hood.

== Seeds ==
Champion seeds are indicated in bold text while text in italics indicates the round in which those seeds were eliminated.

1. (United States) Bob Bryan / (United States) Mike Bryan (first round)
2. (The Bahamas) **Mark Knowles** / (Canada) **Daniel Nestor (champions)**
3. (Czech Republic) Martin Damm / (Czech Republic) Cyril Suk (first round)
4. (Argentina) Lucas Arnold / (Argentina) Mariano Hood (final)

== Draw ==
=== Key ===
- Q = Qualifier
- WC = Wild card
- LL = Lucky loser
- Alt = Alternate
- SE = Special exempt
- PR = Protected ranking
- ITF = ITF entry
- JE = Junior exempt
- w/o = Walkover
- r = Retired
- d = Defaulted
- SR = Special ranking

First round
1	(United States) B Bryan (United States) M Bryan	3	5
(United States) **J Blake** (Netherlands) **M Verkerk**	**6**	**7**
(Germany) D Prinosil (Czech Republic) T Zíb	5	6^{3}
(United States) **S Humphries** (The Bahamas) **M Merklein**	**7**	**7^{7}**
4	(Argentina) **L Arnold** (Argentina) **M Hood**	**6**	**7^{7}**
(South Africa) J Coetzee (South Africa) C Haggard	3	6^{4}
(Spain) **Á López Morón** (Spain) **F Mantilla**	**6**	**6**
WC	(Switzerland) G Bastl (Switzerland) I Heuberger	4	4
(Czech Republic) **J Novák** (Czech Republic) **P Pála**	**6**	**6**
WC	(Switzerland) M Chiudinelli (Switzerland) S Wawrinka	2	4
(Australia) **T Perry** (United States) **J Thomas**	**7**	3	**7^{7}**
3	(Czech Republic) M Damm (Czech Republic) C Suk	5	**6**	6^{4}
(Croatia) **I Ljubičić** (Italy) **F Volandri**	**6**	**6**
(Spain) R Nadal (Spain) T Robredo	4	3
(Switzerland) Y Allegro (Switzerland) M Rosset	4	4
2	(The Bahamas) **M Knowles** (Canada) **D Nestor**	**6**	**6**

Quarterfinals
(United States) J Blake (Netherlands) M Verkerk	4	**6**	5
(United States) **S Humphries** (The Bahamas) **M Merklein**	**6**	2	**7**
4	(Argentina) **L Arnold** (Argentina) M Hood	**6**	**6**
(Spain) Á López Morón (Spain) F Mantilla	3	1
(Czech Republic) **J Novák** (Czech Republic) **P Pála**	**6**	**6**
(Australia) T Perry (United States) J Thomas	4	4
(Croatia) I Ljubičić (Italy) F Volandri	1	4
2	(The Bahamas) **M Knowles** (Canada) **D Nestor**	**6**	**6**

Semifinals
(United States) S Humphries (The Bahamas) M Merklein	5	4
4	(Argentina) **L Arnold** (Argentina) **M Hood**	**7**	**6**
(Czech Republic) J Novák (Czech Republic) P Pála	4	1
2	(The Bahamas) **M Knowles** (Canada) **D Nestor**	**6**	**6**

Final
4	(Argentina) Lucas Arnold (Argentina) Mariano Hood	4	2
2	(The Bahamas) **Mark Knowles** (Canada) **Daniel Nestor**	**6**	**6**
