= 2003 Stella Artois Championships – Doubles =

Doubles
- 2003 Stella Artois Championships

Final
- Champions: (The Bahamas) Mark Knowles (Canada) Daniel Nestor
- Runners-up: (India) Mahesh Bhupathi (Belarus) Max Mirnyi
- Score: 5–7, 6–4, 7–6^{(7–3)}

Details
- Draw: 24

Events
Singles	Doubles
← 2002 ·	Queen's Club Championships	· 2004 →

Wayne Black and Kevin Ullyett were the defending champions but lost in the second round to Xavier Malisse and André Sá.

Mark Knowles and Daniel Nestor won in the final 5–7, 6–4, 7–6^{(7–3)} against Mahesh Bhupathi and Max Mirnyi.

== Seeds ==
All eight seeded teams received byes into the second round.

1. (The Bahamas) Mark Knowles / (Canada) Daniel Nestor (champions)
2. (India) Mahesh Bhupathi / (Belarus) Max Mirnyi (final)
3. (United States) Bob Bryan / (United States) Mike Bryan (second round)
4. (Zimbabwe) Wayne Black / (Zimbabwe) Kevin Ullyett (second round)
5. (Australia) Joshua Eagle / (United States) Jared Palmer (second round)
6. (Australia) Wayne Arthurs / (Australia) Paul Hanley (quarterfinals)
7. (South Africa) Chris Haggard / (South Africa) Robbie Koenig (second round)
8. (Czech Republic) František Čermák / (Czech Republic) Leoš Friedl (second round)

== Draw ==
=== Key ===
- Q = Qualifier
- WC = Wild card
- LL = Lucky loser
- Alt = Alternate
- SE = Special exempt
- PR = Protected ranking
- ITF = ITF entry
- JE = Junior exempt
- w/o = Walkover
- r = Retired
- d = Defaulted
- SR = Special ranking

=== Finals ===
Semifinals
1	(The Bahamas) Mark Knowles (Canada) Daniel Nestor	6	7^{9}
4	(United States) Rick Leach (United States) Brian MacPhie	4	6^{7}
(Belgium) Xavier Malisse (Brazil) André Sá	1	4
2	(India) Mahesh Bhupathi (Belarus) Max Mirnyi	6	6

Final
1	(The Bahamas) Mark Knowles (Canada) Daniel Nestor	5	6	7^{7}
2	(India) Mahesh Bhupathi (Belarus) Max Mirnyi	7	4	6^{3}

=== Top half ===
First round
(South Africa) D Adams (United States) J Gimelstob	5	6^{4}
(Australia) A Kratzmann (United States) J Tarango	7	7^{7}
(Thailand) P Srichaphan (Serbia and Montenegro) N Zimonjić	6	6
(United States) D Bowen (Australia) A Fisher	2	3
(United States) S Humphries (The Bahamas) M Merklein	7^{8}	7
(France) S Grosjean (Italy) D Sanguinetti	6^{6}	5
(United States) T Dent (United States) M Fish	6	1	6^{7}
(United States) R Leach (United States) B MacPhie	1	6	7^{9}

Second round
1	(The Bahamas) M Knowles (Canada) D Nestor	6	6
(Australia) A Kratzmann (United States) J Tarango	4	2
(Thailand) P Srichaphan (Serbia and Montenegro) N Zimonjić	6	5	6
8	(Czech Republic) F Čermák (Czech Republic) L Friedl	3	7	4
3	(United States) B Bryan (United States) M Bryan	6	5	3
(United States) S Humphries (The Bahamas) M Merklein	3	7	6
(United States) R Leach (United States) B MacPhie	7	6^{2}	6
7	(South Africa) C Haggard (South Africa) R Koenig	5	7^{7}	3

Quarterfinals
1	(The Bahamas) M Knowles (Canada) D Nestor	4	6	7^{10}
(Thailand) P Srichaphan (Serbia and Montenegro) N Zimonjić	6	1	6^{8}
(United States) S Humphries (The Bahamas) M Merklein	6	6^{6}	6^{9}
(United States) R Leach (United States) B MacPhie	4	7^{8}	7^{11}

Semifinals
1	(The Bahamas) M Knowles (Canada) D Nestor	6	7^{9}
(United States) R Leach (United States) B MacPhie	4	6^{7}

=== Bottom half ===
First round
(Australia) L Hewitt (Australia) M Philippoussis	6	7
(United States) J-M Gambill (United States) G Oliver	2	5
(Belgium) X Malisse (Brazil) A Sá	1	6	6
WC	(Netherlands) S Schalken (Netherlands) J van Lottum	6	3	2
(United Kingdom) J Marray (United Kingdom) D Sherwood	6^{2}	6	6
(Czech Republic) O Fukárek (Czech Republic) P Luxa	7^{7}	0	4
(Australia) N Healey (Czech Republic) D Škoch	3	4
(Finland) J Nieminen (Netherlands) R Sluiter	6	6

Second round
5	(Australia) J Eagle (United States) J Palmer	3	4
(Australia) L Hewitt (Australia) M Philippoussis	6	6
(Belgium) X Malisse (Brazil) A Sá	6	6	7
4	(Zimbabwe) W Black (Zimbabwe) K Ullyett	3	7	5
6	(Australia) W Arthurs (Australia) P Hanley	6	6
(United Kingdom) J Marray (United Kingdom) D Sherwood	3	4
(Finland) J Nieminen (Netherlands) R Sluiter	3	4
2	(India) M Bhupathi (Belarus) M Mirnyi	6	6

Quarterfinals
(Australia) L Hewitt (Australia) M Philippoussis	6	5	6^{2}
(Belgium) X Malisse (Brazil) A Sá	2	7	7^{7}
6	(Australia) W Arthurs (Australia) P Hanley	3	6^{9}
2	(India) M Bhupathi (Belarus) M Mirnyi	6	7^{11}

Semifinals
(Belgium) X Malisse (Brazil) A Sá	1	4
2	(India) M Bhupathi (Belarus) M Mirnyi	6	6
