= 2003 Abierto Mexicano Telefonica Movistar – Men's singles =

Men's singles
- 2003 Abierto Mexicano Telefonica Movistar

Final
- Champion: (Argentina) Agustín Calleri
- Runner-up: (Argentina) Mariano Zabaleta
- Score: 7–5, 3–6, 6–3

Events
Singles	men	women
Doubles	men	women
← 2002 ·	Abierto Mexicano Telefonica Movistar	· 2004 →

Carlos Moyá was the defending champion but lost in the quarterfinals to Félix Mantilla.

Agustín Calleri won in the final 7–5, 3–6, 6–3 against Mariano Zabaleta.

== Seeds ==
1. (Spain) Carlos Moyá (quarterfinals)
2. (Argentina) David Nalbandian (second round)
3. (Argentina) Gastón Gaudio (second round)
4. (Chile) Fernando González (quarterfinals)
5. (Argentina) Juan Ignacio Chela (first round)
6. (Brazil) Gustavo Kuerten (semifinals)
7. (Chile) Marcelo Ríos (quarterfinals)
8. (Ecuador) Nicolás Lapentti (first round)

== Draw ==
=== Key ===
- Q = Qualifier
- WC = Wild card
- LL = Lucky loser
- Alt = Alternate
- SE = Special exempt
- PR = Protected ranking
- ITF = ITF entry
- JE = Junior exempt
- w/o = Walkover
- r = Retired
- d = Defaulted
- SR = Special ranking

=== Finals ===
Semifinals
(Spain) Felix Mantilla	2	2
(Argentina) Agustín Calleri	6	6
WC/6	(Brazil) Gustavo Kuerten	6^{4}	7^{7}	5
(Argentina) Mariano Zabaleta	7^{7}	6^{3}	7

Final
(Argentina) Agustín Calleri	7	3	6
(Argentina) Mariano Zabaleta	5	6	3

=== Top half ===
First round
1	(Spain) C Moyá	6	6
(Brazil) F Saretta	0	2
LL	(Brazil) R Mello	6	4	6
WC	(Spain) F Clavet	4	6	1
(Spain) A Martín	2	1
(Spain) F Vicente	6	6
(Spain) F Mantilla	7^{7}	7^{7}
5	(Argentina) J I Chela	6^{4}	6^{1}
3	(Argentina) G Gaudio	1	6	6
(Spain) D Sánchez	6	4	4
(Argentina) A Calleri	6	6
WC	(Mexico) M Gallardo-Valles	1	3
(Brazil) F Meligeni	1	4
LL	(Costa Rica) J A Marín	6	6
(Argentina) F Squillari	6	0	4
7	(Chile) M Ríos	2	6	6

Second round
1	(Spain) C Moyá	4	6	6
LL	(Brazil) R Mello	6	3	2
(Spain) F Vicente	3	4
(Spain) F Mantilla	6	6
3	(Argentina) G Gaudio	6^{5}	6^{5}
(Argentina) A Calleri	7^{7}	7^{7}
LL	(Costa Rica) J A Marín	3	1
7	(Chile) M Ríos	6	6

Quarterfinals
1	(Spain) C Moyá	4	6^{4}
(Spain) F Mantilla	6	7^{7}
(Argentina) A Calleri	6	7
7	(Chile) M Ríos	3	5

Semifinals
(Spain) F Mantilla	2	2
(Argentina) A Calleri	6	6

=== Bottom half ===
First round
WC/6	(Brazil) G Kuerten	6^{2}	7^{12}	6
Q	(France) N Coutelot	7^{7}	6^{10}	2
(Spain) D Ferrer	6	6
(Spain) A Portas	1	4
(Spain) A Montañés	3	0
(Armenia) S Sargsian	6	6
Q	(Spain) R R Hidalgo	1	6	6^{6}
4	(Chile) F González	6	3	7^{8}
8	(Ecuador) N Lapentti	2	1
(Peru) L Horna	6	6
(Brazil) A Sá	5	6	6^{1}
Q	(Peru) I Miranda	7	4	7^{7}
Q	(Italy) F Volandri	1	2
(Argentina) M Zabaleta	6	6
(Chile) N Massú	6	1	4
2	(Argentina) D Nalbandian	2	6	6

Second round
WC/6	(Brazil) G Kuerten	5	6	6
(Spain) D Ferrer	7	1	2
(Armenia) S Sargsian	3	6	6^{5}
4	(Chile) F González	6	4	7^{7}
(Peru) L Horna	6	3	2
Q	(Peru) I Miranda	2	6	6
(Argentina) M Zabaleta	6^{5}	6	6
2	(Argentina) D Nalbandian	7^{7}	0	0

Quarterfinals
WC/6	(Brazil) G Kuerten	6	0
4	(Chile) F González	4	0^{r}
Q	(Peru) I Miranda	5	3
(Argentina) M Zabaleta	7	6

Semifinals
WC/6	(Brazil) G Kuerten	6^{4}	7^{7}	5
(Argentina) M Zabaleta	7^{7}	6^{3}	7
