= 2003 CA-TennisTrophy – Doubles =

Doubles
- 2003 CA-TennisTrophy

Final
- Champions: (Switzerland) Yves Allegro (Switzerland) Roger Federer
- Runners-up: (India) Mahesh Bhupathi (Belarus) Max Mirnyi
- Score: 7–6^{(9–7)}, 7–5

Details
- Draw: 16
- Seeds: 4

Events
Singles	Doubles
← 2002 ·	Vienna Open	· 2004 →

Joshua Eagle and Sandon Stolle were the defending champions but did not compete that year.

Yves Allegro and Roger Federer won in the final 7–6^{(9–7)}, 7–5 against Mahesh Bhupathi and Max Mirnyi.

== Seeds ==
1. (Sweden) Jonas Björkman / (Australia) Todd Woodbridge (first round)
2. (India) Mahesh Bhupathi / (Belarus) Max Mirnyi (final)
3. (Czech Republic) Martin Damm / (Czech Republic) Cyril Suk (first round)
4. (United States) Jared Palmer / (Czech Republic) David Rikl (first round)

== Draw ==
=== Key ===
- Q = Qualifier
- WC = Wild card
- LL = Lucky loser
- Alt = Alternate
- SE = Special exempt
- PR = Protected ranking
- ITF = ITF entry
- JE = Junior exempt
- w/o = Walkover
- r = Retired
- d = Defaulted
- SR = Special ranking

First round
1	(Sweden) J Björkman (Australia) T Woodbridge	4	4
WC	(Austria) S Koubek (Austria) J Melzer	6	6
(Spain) A Costa (Netherlands) J van Lottum	4	4
(Chile) F González (Spain) T Robredo	6	6
3	(Czech Republic) M Damm (Czech Republic) C Suk	5	3
(Switzerland) Y Allegro (Switzerland) R Federer	7	6
(Argentina) J I Chela (Chile) N Massú	5	2
(South Africa) J Coetzee (South Africa) C Haggard	7	6
(Finland) J Nieminen (Armenia) S Sargsian	4	6	4
WC	(Austria) J Knowle (Austria) A Peya	6	4	6
(Argentina) L Arnold (Argentina) M Hood	6	6
4	(United States) J Palmer (Czech Republic) D Rikl	3	0
(United States) J Blake (United States) G Oliver	4	6	6
(United States) D Bowen (Germany) N Kiefer	6	4	2
(Czech Republic) J Novák (Czech Republic) P Pála	3	2
2	(India) M Bhupathi (Belarus) M Mirnyi	6	6

Quarterfinals
WC	(Austria) S Koubek (Austria) J Melzer	w/o
(Chile) F González (Spain) T Robredo
(Switzerland) Y Allegro (Switzerland) R Federer	6	6
(South Africa) J Coetzee (South Africa) C Haggard	3	4
WC	(Austria) J Knowle (Austria) A Peya	6^{4}	6^{5}
(Argentina) L Arnold (Argentina) M Hood	7^{7}	7^{7}
(United States) J Blake (United States) G Oliver	3	4
2	(India) M Bhupathi (Belarus) M Mirnyi	6	6

Semifinals
WC	(Austria) S Koubek (Austria) J Melzer	3	2
(Switzerland) Y Allegro (Switzerland) R Federer	6	6
(Argentina) L Arnold (Argentina) M Hood	3	7^{7}	1
2	(India) M Bhupathi (Belarus) M Mirnyi	6	6^{2}	6

Final
(Switzerland) Y Allegro (Switzerland) R Federer	7^{9}	7
2	(India) M Bhupathi (Belarus) M Mirnyi	6^{7}	5
