= 2003 Gerry Weber Open – Singles =

Singles
- 2003 Gerry Weber Open

Final
- Champion: (Switzerland) Roger Federer
- Runner-up: (Germany) Nicolas Kiefer
- Score: 6–1, 6–3

Details
- Draw: 32
- Seeds: 8

Events
Singles	Doubles
- Gerry Weber Open

Yevgeny Kafelnikov was the defending champion but lost in the first round to Karol Kučera.

Roger Federer won in the final 6–1, 6–3 against Nicolas Kiefer. This tournament marked the beginning of Federer's dominance on grass courts; he remained undefeated on the surface until the final of Wimbledon in 2008. Federer's subsequent 65-match winning streak on grass remains the longest tour-level winning streak on the surface for a male player in the Open Era. It was the first of a record ten singles titles won by Federer in Halle.

== Seeds ==
A champion seed is indicated in bold text while text in italics indicates the round in which that seed was eliminated.

1. (Switzerland) **Roger Federer (champion)**
2. (Germany) Rainer Schüttler (second round)
3. (Czech Republic) Jiří Novák (quarterfinals)
4. (Russia) Yevgeny Kafelnikov (first round)
5. (Morocco) Younes El Aynaoui (quarterfinals)
6. (Russia) Mikhail Youzhny (semifinals)
7. (Russia) Nikolay Davydenko (first round)
8. (France) Arnaud Clément (semifinals)

== Draw ==
Key

- Q = Qualifier
- WC = Wild card
- LL = Lucky loser
- Alt = Alternate
- ITF = ITF entry
- PR = Protected ranking
- SR = Special ranking
- SE = Special exempt
- JE = Junior exempt
- JR = Junior Accelerator Programme entrant
- CO = College Accelerator Programme entrant
- NG = Next Gen Accelerator Program entrant
- w/o = Walkover
- r = Retired
- d = Defaulted

=== Finals ===
Semifinals
1	(Switzerland) **Roger Federer**	4	**7^{7}**	**6**
6	(Russia) Mikhail Youzhny	**6**	6^{4}	2
8	(France) Arnaud Clément	**6**	6^{4}	4
**(Germany) Nicolas Kiefer**	4	**7^{7}**	**6**

Final
1	(Switzerland) **Roger Federer**	**6**	**6**
(Germany) Nicolas Kiefer	1	3

=== Top half ===
First round
1	(Switzerland) **R Federer**	**7**	**6**
(Armenia) S Sargsian	5	1
(South Korea) H-T Lee	4	0
(Spain) **F Vicente**	**6**	**6**
(Germany) **L Burgsmüller**	**6**	5	**6**
Q	(Switzerland) J-C Scherrer	4	**7**	4
WC	(Germany) C Koderisch	1	2
5	(Morocco) **Y El Aynaoui**	**6**	**6**
3	(Czech Republic) **J Novák**	**6**	**6**
WC	(Germany) H Dreekmann	2	4
(Austria) **S Koubek**	**6**	**6**
Q	(Switzerland) Y Allegro	4	3
WC	(Germany) M Abel	3	4
(Sweden) **J Björkman**	**6**	**6**
(France) P-H Mathieu	**6**	1	2^{r}
6	(Russia) **M Youzhny**	1	**6**	5

Second round
1	(Switzerland) **R Federer**	4	**6**	**6**
(Spain) F Vicente	**6**	2	1
(Germany) L Burgsmüller	3	3
5	(Morocco) **Y El Aynaoui**	**6**	**6**
3	(Czech Republic) **J Novák**	**6**	**6**
(Austria) S Koubek	4	3
(Sweden) J Björkman	4	5
6	(Russia) **M Youzhny**	**6**	**7**

Quarterfinals
1	(Switzerland) **R Federer**	**7**	**7^{7}**
5	(Morocco) Y El Aynaoui	5	6^{3}
3	(Czech Republic) J Novák	4	4
6	(Russia) **M Youzhny**	**6**	**6**

Semifinals
1	(Switzerland) **R Federer**	4	**7^{7}**	**6**
6	(Russia) M Youzhny	**6**	6^{4}	2

=== Bottom half ===
First round
8	(France) **A Clément**	**6**	**6**
Q	(Canada) F Niemeyer	3	0
(Croatia) **I Ljubičić**	**7^{7}**	**6**
Q	(Germany) D Prinosil	6^{5}	2
(France) **F Santoro**	**6**	4	**6**
(United States) B Vahaly	2	**6**	3
(Slovakia) **K Kučera**	**6**	6^{8}	**7^{7}**
4	(Russia) Y Kafelnikov	1	**7^{10}**	6^{5}
7	(Russia) N Davydenko	6^{5}	3
(Spain) **F López**	**7^{7}**	**6**
(Germany) **N Kiefer**	**6**	**6**
(Belgium) O Rochus	3	0
(France) N Escudé	**6**	3	0^{r}
(Czech Republic) **R Štěpánek**	3	**6**	3
(Denmark) K Carlsen	3	4
2	(Germany) **R Schüttler**	**6**	**6**

Second round
8	(France) **A Clément**	**6**	**6**
(Croatia) I Ljubičić	4	2
(France) F Santoro	3	3
(Slovakia) **K Kučera**	**6**	**6**
(Spain) F López	1	**6**	5
(Germany) **N Kiefer**	**6**	3	**7**
(Czech Republic) **R Štěpánek**	**6**	6^{6}	**6**
2	(Germany) R Schüttler	4	**7^{8}**	3

Quarterfinals
8	(France) **A Clément**	**7**	6^{5}	**7^{8}**
(Slovakia) K Kučera	5	**7^{7}**	6^{6}
(Germany) **N Kiefer**	**7**	**6**
(Czech Republic) R Štěpánek	5	3

Semifinals
8	(France) A Clément	**6**	6^{4}	4
(Germany) **N Kiefer**	4	**7^{7}**	**6**
