= 2003 Abierto Mexicano Telefonica Movistar – Women's singles =

Women's singles
- 2003 Abierto Mexicano Telefonica Movistar

Final
- Champion: (South Africa) Amanda Coetzer
- Runner-up: (Argentina) Mariana Díaz Oliva
- Score: 7–5, 6–3

Events
| Singles | men | women |
| Doubles | men | women |
- Mexican Open

Katarina Srebotnik was the defending champion, but lost in second round to Petra Mandula.

Amanda Coetzer won the title by defeating Mariana Díaz Oliva 7–5, 6–3 in the final. It was the 9th and last title for Coetzer in her career.

== Seeds ==
The first two seeds received a bye into the second round.

1. (Russia) Elena Dementieva (second round)
2. (South Africa) Amanda Coetzer (champion)
3. (Argentina) Paola Suárez (first round, retired due to a back injury)
4. (Slovenia) Katarina Srebotnik (second round)
5. (Spain) Magüi Serna (first round)
6. (Slovenia) Tina Pisnik (first round)
7. (France) Émilie Loit (semifinals)
8. (Switzerland) Emmanuelle Gagliardi (second round)

== Draw ==
Key

- Q = Qualifier
- WC = Wild card
- LL = Lucky loser
- Alt = Alternate
- ITF = ITF entry
- PR = Protected ranking
- SR = Special ranking
- SE = Special exempt
- JE = Junior exempt
- JR = Junior Accelerator Programme entrant
- CO = College Accelerator Programme entrant
- NG = Next Gen Accelerator Program entrant
- w/o = Walkover
- r = Retired
- d = Defaulted

=== Finals ===
Semifinals
(Japan) Shinobu Asagoe | 1 | 7^{7} | 1
(Argentina) Mariana Díaz Oliva | 6 | 6^{5} | 6
7 | (France) Émilie Loit | 3 | 4
2 | (South Africa) Amanda Coetzer | 6 | 6

Final
(Argentina) Mariana Díaz Oliva | 5 | 3
2 | (South Africa) Amanda Coetzer | 7 | 6

=== Top half ===
First round
(Japan) S Asagoe | 6^{4} | 6 | 7^{7}
(Italy) A Serra Zanetti | 7^{7} | 2 | 6^{1}
(Spain) C Torrens Valero | 7^{7} | 4 | 6
(Paraguay) R de los Ríos | 6^{3} | 6 | 2
WC | (Argentina) ME Salerni | 7 | 1 | 4
8 | (Switzerland) E Gagliardi | 5 | 6 | 6
3 | (Argentina) P Suárez | 2^{r}
(Argentina) M Díaz Oliva | 5
(Germany) M Müller | 1 | 6 | 6
(Sweden) Å Svensson | 6 | 2 | 4
PR | (Spain) A Medina Garrigues | 6 | 6
(Germany) A Roesch | 4 | 1
Q | (Czech Republic) A Vašková | 6 | 6
5 | (Spain) M Serna | 3 | 2

Second round
1 | (Russia) E Dementieva | 7 | 3 | 3
(Japan) S Asagoe | 5 | 6 | 6
(Spain) C Torrens Valero | 7^{8} | 7^{10}
8 | (Switzerland) E Gagliardi | 6^{6} | 6^{8}
(Argentina) M Díaz Oliva | 6 | 6
(Germany) M Müller | 1 | 2
PR | (Spain) A Medina Garrigues | 5 | 6^{6}
Q | (Czech Republic) A Vašková | 7 | 7^{8}

Quarterfinals
(Japan) S Asagoe | 6 | 5 | 7
(Spain) C Torrens Valero | 4 | 7 | 5
(Argentina) M Díaz Oliva | 6 | 4 | 7^{7}
Q | (Czech Republic) A Vašková | 3 | 6 | 6^{5}

Semifinals
(Japan) S Asagoe | 1 | 7^{7} | 1
(Argentina) M Díaz Oliva | 6 | 6^{5} | 6

=== Bottom half ===
First round
7 | (France) É Loit | 6 | 6
PR | (South Africa) J Kruger | 3 | 0
Q | (Venezuela) M Sequera | 1 | 2
(Spain) M Marrero | 6 | 6
Q | (Croatia) I Abramović | 3 | 6^{2}
(Hungary) P Mandula | 6 | 7^{7}
(Colombia) F Zuluaga | 4 | 6^{4}
4 | (Slovenia) K Srebotnik | 6 | 7^{7}
6 | (Slovenia) T Pisnik | 6 | 4 | 3
(Austria) P Wartusch | 3 | 6 | 6
Q | (Spain) P García | 3 | 2
(Italy) F Pennetta | 6 | 6
(Czech Republic) K Koukalová | 6 | 6
WC | (Mexico) M Torres Sandoval | 0 | 2

Second round
7 | (France) É Loit | 4 | 6 | 6
(Spain) M Marrero | 6 | 3 | 3
(Hungary) P Mandula | 6 | 6
4 | (Slovenia) K Srebotnik | 4 | 2
(Austria) P Wartusch | 4 | 6 | 4
(Italy) F Pennetta | 6 | 2 | 6
(Czech Republic) K Koukalová | 4 | 6 | 5
2 | (South Africa) A Coetzer | 6 | 3 | 7

Quarterfinals
7 | (France) É Loit | 3 | 6 | 6
(Hungary) P Mandula | 6 | 2 | 1
(Italy) F Pennetta | 6 | 2 | 3
2 | (South Africa) A Coetzer | 4 | 6 | 6

Semifinals
7 | (France) É Loit | 3 | 4
2 | (South Africa) A Coetzer | 6 | 6
