= 2003 CA-TennisTrophy – Singles =

Singles
- 2003 CA-TennisTrophy

Final
- Champion: (Switzerland) Roger Federer
- Runner-up: (Spain) Carlos Moyá
- Score: 6–3, 6–3, 6–3

Details
- Draw: 32
- Seeds: 8

Events
Singles	Doubles
- Vienna Open

Roger Federer was the defending champion and won in the final 6–3, 6–3, 6–3 against Carlos Moyá.

== Seeds ==
1. (Switzerland) Roger Federer (champion)
2. (Spain) Carlos Moyá (final)
3. (Czech Republic) Jiří Novák (first round)
4. (Netherlands) Sjeng Schalken (second round)
5. (Argentina) Agustín Calleri (second round, withdrew because of the flu)
6. (Spain) Tommy Robredo (first round)
7. (Chile) Nicolás Massú (first round)
8. (Spain) Albert Costa (second round)

== Draw ==
Key

- Q = Qualifier
- WC = Wild card
- LL = Lucky loser
- Alt = Alternate
- ITF = ITF entry
- PR = Protected ranking
- SR = Special ranking
- SE = Special exempt
- JE = Junior exempt
- JR = Junior Accelerator Programme entrant
- CO = College Accelerator Programme entrant
- NG = Next Gen Accelerator Program entrant
- w/o = Walkover
- r = Retired
- d = Defaulted

=== Final ===
Semifinals
1	(Switzerland) Roger Federer	6	7^{7}
(Belarus) Max Mirnyi	2	6^{2}
(United Kingdom) Tim Henman	6^{1}	5
2	(Spain) Carlos Moyá	7^{7}	7

Final
1	(Switzerland) Roger Federer	6	6	6
2	(Spain) Carlos Moyá	3	3	3

=== Section 1 ===
First round
1	(Switzerland) R Federer	6	6
(Spain) D Ferrer	2	2
(United States) J Blake	6	3	6^{6}
Q	(Slovakia) K Beck	3	6	7^{8}
(Finland) J Nieminen	7^{7}	6
(Slovakia) K Kučera	6^{4}	0
(Argentina) J I Chela	7	7^{7}
7	(Chile) N Massú	5	6^{4}
3	(Czech Republic) J Novák	4	6^{3}
(Spain) F López	6	7^{7}
WC	(Austria) S Koubek	6	4	7^{7}
(Russia) N Davydenko	2	6	6^{3}
(United States) J-M Gambill	4	2
(Belarus) M Mirnyi	6	6
(Argentina) M Zabaleta	4	2
5	(Argentina) A Calleri	6	6

Second round
1	(Switzerland) R Federer	6	4	6
Q	(Slovakia) K Beck	3	6	4
(Finland) J Nieminen	6	6^{10}	6
(Argentina) J I Chela	2	7^{12}	3
(Spain) F López	6	6
WC	(Austria) S Koubek	2	2
(Belarus) M Mirnyi	w/o
5	(Argentina) A Calleri

Quarterfinals
1	(Switzerland) R Federer	6	6
(Finland) J Nieminen	3	3
(Spain) F López	6^{5}	4
(Belarus) M Mirnyi	7^{7}	6

Semifinals
1	(Switzerland) R Federer	6	7^{7}
(Belarus) M Mirnyi	2	6^{2}

=== Section 2 ===
First round
8	(Spain) A Costa	6	6
(Armenia) S Sargsian	4	4
(Italy) F Volandri	1	4
(Sweden) J Björkman	6	6
(United Kingdom) T Henman	6	6
Q	(Italy) S Pescosolido	2	3
Q	(Germany) A Waske	6	1	2
4	(Netherlands) S Schalken	4	6	6
6	(Spain) T Robredo	2	7^{7}	6^{3}
WC	(Austria) J Melzer	6	6^{4}	7^{7}
(Germany) N Kiefer	7	7
WC	(Austria) A Peya	5	5
Q	(Italy) D Sanguinetti	7^{7}	4	0^{r}
(United States) V Spadea	6^{4}	6	1
(Chile) F González	4	7^{8}	1
2	(Spain) C Moyá	6	6^{6}	6

Second round
8	(Spain) A Costa	3	4
(Sweden) J Björkman	6	6
(United Kingdom) T Henman	6	2	6
4	(Netherlands) S Schalken	2	6	2
WC	(Austria) J Melzer	3	4
(Germany) N Kiefer	6	6
(United States) V Spadea	2	1
2	(Spain) C Moyá	6	6

Quarterfinals
(Sweden) J Björkman	1	4
(United Kingdom) T Henman	6	6
(Germany) N Kiefer	4	6^{5}
2	(Spain) C Moyá	6	7^{7}

Semifinals
(United Kingdom) T Henman	6^{1}	5
2	(Spain) C Moyá	7^{7}	7
