= 2003 If Stockholm Open – Doubles =

Doubles
- 2003 If Stockholm Open

Final
- Champions: (Sweden) Jonas Björkman (Australia) Todd Woodbridge
- Runners-up: (Australia) Wayne Arthurs (Australia) Paul Hanley
- Score: 6–3, 6–4

Events
Singles	Doubles
← 2002 ·	If Stockholm Open	· 2004 →

Wayne Black and Kevin Ullyett were the defending champions but lost in the quarterfinals to Wayne Arthurs and Paul Hanley.

Jonas Björkman and Todd Woodbridge won in the final 6–3, 6–4 against Arthurs and Hanley.

== Seeds ==
1. (Sweden) Jonas Björkman / (Australia) Todd Woodbridge (champions)
2. (Australia) Wayne Arthurs / (Australia) Paul Hanley (final)
3. (United States) Jared Palmer / (Czech Republic) David Rikl (quarterfinals)
4. (Argentina) Gastón Etlis / (Argentina) Martín Rodríguez (semifinals)

== Draw ==
=== Key ===
- Q = Qualifier
- WC = Wild card
- LL = Lucky loser
- Alt = Alternate
- SE = Special exempt
- PR = Protected ranking
- ITF = ITF entry
- JE = Junior exempt
- w/o = Walkover
- r = Retired
- d = Defaulted
- SR = Special ranking

First round
1	(Sweden) J Björkman (Australia) T Woodbridge	6	6
(Sweden) S Aspelin (Italy) M Bertolini	1	1
(United States) R Leach (United States) B MacPhie	7^{8}	6^{5}	7^{7}
ALT	(Australia) P Baccanello (Italy) D Sanguinetti	6^{8}	7^{7}	6^{5}
3	(United States) J Palmer (Czech Republic) D Rikl	3	6	6
(South Africa) W Ferreira (United States) R Ginepri	6	2	1
(United States) M Fish (United States) G Oliver	4	6	6^{4}
WC	(Sweden) J Johansson (Sweden) A Vinciguerra	6	4	7^{7}
ALT	(Croatia) M Ančić (Slovakia) K Beck	7^{7}	3	6
(Finland) J Nieminen (Thailand) P Srichaphan	6^{4}	6	3
(South Africa) R Koenig (South Africa) W Moodie	4	4
4	(Argentina) G Etlis (Argentina) M Rodríguez	6	6
(Zimbabwe) W Black (Zimbabwe) K Ullyett	6^{5}	6	6
WC	(Sweden) J Landsberg (Sweden) R Söderling	7^{7}	2	4
(United States) D Bowen (Australia) A Fisher	3	4
2	(Australia) W Arthurs (Australia) P Hanley	6	6

Quarterfinals
1	(Sweden) J Björkman (Australia) T Woodbridge	w/o
(United States) R Leach (United States) B MacPhie
3	(United States) J Palmer (Czech Republic) D Rikl	6^{4}	6	3
WC	(Sweden) J Johansson (Sweden) A Vinciguerra	7^{7}	2	6
ALT	(Croatia) M Ančić (Slovakia) K Beck
4	(Argentina) G Etlis (Argentina) M Rodríguez	w/o
(Zimbabwe) W Black (Zimbabwe) K Ullyett	2	7^{7}	6^{5}
2	(Australia) W Arthurs (Australia) P Hanley	6	6^{2}	7^{7}

Semifinals
1	(Sweden) J Björkman (Australia) T Woodbridge	6	7
WC	(Sweden) J Johansson (Sweden) A Vinciguerra	3	5
4	(Argentina) G Etlis (Argentina) M Rodríguez	6^{5}	4
2	(Australia) W Arthurs (Australia) P Hanley	7^{7}	6

Final
1	(Sweden) J Björkman (Australia) T Woodbridge	6	6
2	(Australia) W Arthurs (Australia) P Hanley	3	4
