= 2003 Abierto Mexicano Telefonica Movistar – Men's doubles =

Men's doubles
- 2003 Abierto Mexicano Telefonica Movistar

Final
- Champions: (The Bahamas) Mark Knowles (Canada) Daniel Nestor
- Runners-up: (Spain) David Ferrer (Spain) Fernando Vicente
- Score: 6–3, 6–3

Events
Singles	men	women
Doubles	men	women
← 2002 ·	Abierto Mexicano Telefonica Movistar	· 2004 →

Bob Bryan and Mike Bryan were the defending champions but lost in the semifinals to David Ferrer and Fernando Vicente.

Mark Knowles and Daniel Nestor won in the final 6–3, 6–3 against Ferrer and Vicente.

== Seeds ==
1. (The Bahamas) Mark Knowles / (Canada) Daniel Nestor (champions)
2. (United States) Bob Bryan / (United States) Mike Bryan (semifinals)
3. (South Africa) Chris Haggard / (United States) Brian MacPhie (first round)
4. (South Africa) David Adams / (South Africa) Robbie Koenig (first round)

== Draw ==
=== Key ===
- Q = Qualifier
- WC = Wild card
- LL = Lucky loser
- Alt = Alternate
- SE = Special exempt
- PR = Protected ranking
- ITF = ITF entry
- JE = Junior exempt
- w/o = Walkover
- r = Retired
- d = Defaulted
- SR = Special ranking

First round
1	(The Bahamas) M Knowles (Canada) D Nestor	7	6
ALT	(Spain) A Martín (Spain) A Montañés	5	3
(Spain) A Portas (Brazil) A Sá	6	6
(Chile) F González (Argentina) A Schneiter	4	2
4	(South Africa) D Adams (South Africa) R Koenig	6^{7}	7^{7}	5
(Argentina) G Etlis (Argentina) M Rodríguez	7^{9}	6^{3}	7
WC	(Ecuador) N Lapentti (Argentina) L Lobo	6	1	6^{3}
(Czech Republic) F Čermák (Czech Republic) L Friedl	2	6	7^{7}
(Argentina) G Gaudio (Argentina) M Hood	4	4
(Spain) D Ferrer (Spain) F Vicente	6	6
(Australia) J Eagle (Australia) A Kratzmann	4	6	6
3	(South Africa) C Haggard (United States) B MacPhie	6	3	4
WC	(Mexico) G Carter (Mexico) L Flores	3	4
(Argentina) A Calleri (Argentina) J I Chela	6	6
(Argentina) L Arnold (Argentina) D Nalbandian	0	2
2	(United States) B Bryan (United States) M Bryan	6	6

Quarterfinals
1	(The Bahamas) M Knowles (Canada) D Nestor	6	6
(Spain) A Portas (Brazil) A Sá	1	4
(Argentina) G Etlis (Argentina) M Rodríguez	6	3	7^{7}
(Czech Republic) F Čermák (Czech Republic) L Friedl	4	6	6^{3}
(Spain) D Ferrer (Spain) F Vicente	6	3	6
(Australia) J Eagle (Australia) A Kratzmann	4	6	3
(Argentina) A Calleri (Argentina) J I Chela	6	3	2
2	(United States) B Bryan (United States) M Bryan	4	6	6

Semifinals
1	(The Bahamas) M Knowles (Canada) D Nestor	6	7^{7}
(Argentina) G Etlis (Argentina) M Rodríguez	1	6^{3}
(Spain) D Ferrer (Spain) F Vicente	7^{10}	4	6
2	(United States) B Bryan (United States) M Bryan	6^{8}	6	1

Final
1	(The Bahamas) M Knowles (Canada) D Nestor	6	6
(Spain) D Ferrer (Spain) F Vicente	3	3
