= 2003 Abierto Mexicano Telefonica Movistar – Women's doubles =

Women's doubles
- 2003 Abierto Mexicano Telefonica Movistar

Final
- Champions: (France) Émilie Loit (Sweden) Åsa Svensson
- Runners-up: (Hungary) Petra Mandula (Austria) Patricia Wartusch
- Score: 6–3, 6–1

Events
Singles	men	women
Doubles	men	women
← 2002 ·	Mexican Open	· 2004 →

Virginia Ruano Pascual and Paola Suárez were the defending champions, but did not compete this year.

Émilie Loit and Åsa Svensson won the title by defeating Petra Mandula and Patricia Wartusch 6–3, 6–1 in the final. It was the 6th title for Loit and the 15th title for Svensson in their respective doubles careers.

== Seeds ==
1. (Hungary) Petra Mandula / (Austria) Patricia Wartusch (final)
2. (Slovenia) Tina Križan / (Slovenia) Katarina Srebotnik (semifinals)
3. (France) Émilie Loit / (Sweden) Åsa Svensson (champions)
4. (Spain) Marta Marrero / (Paraguay) Rossana de los Ríos (first round)

== Draw ==
=== Key ===
- Q = Qualifier
- WC = Wild card
- LL = Lucky loser
- Alt = Alternate
- SE = Special exempt
- PR = Protected ranking
- ITF = ITF entry
- JE = Junior exempt
- w/o = Walkover
- r = Retired
- d = Defaulted
- SR = Special ranking

=== Draw ===
First round
1	(Hungary) P Mandula (Austria) P Wartusch	6	6
(Spain) C Martínez Granados (Italy) Ad Serra Zanetti	2	2
WC	(Mexico) M Arroyo (Mexico) E Clarke	1	1
(Germany) M Müller (Venezuela) M Sequera	6	6
4	(Spain) M Marrero (Paraguay) R de los Ríos	2	5
(Germany) K Freye (Germany) A Roesch	6	7
Q	(Croatia) I Abramović (Canada) M Marois	3	2
(Italy) F Pennetta (Argentina) ME Salerni	6	6
(Spain) M Serna (Colombia) F Zuluaga	6	2	6
(Switzerland) E Gagliardi (United States) A Harkleroad	3	6	2
(Russia) A Rodionova (Germany) M Weingärtner	4	3
3	(France) É Loit (Sweden) Å Svensson	6	6
(Argentina) G Dulko (United States) S Reeves	3	4
(Japan) S Asagoe (Republic of Ireland) K Liggan	6	6
(South Africa) J Kruger (Spain) MJ Martínez Sánchez	3	6	6
2	(Slovenia) T Križan (Slovenia) K Srebotnik	6	2	2

Quarterfinals
1	(Hungary) P Mandula (Austria) P Wartusch	6	6
(Germany) M Müller (Venezuela) M Sequera	3	3
(Germany) K Freye (Germany) A Roesch	2	6	5
(Italy) F Pennetta (Argentina) ME Salerni	6	4	7
(Spain) M Serna (Colombia) F Zuluaga	4	2
3	(France) É Loit (Sweden) Å Svensson	6	6
(Japan) S Asagoe (Republic of Ireland) K Liggan	5	2
2	(Slovenia) T Križan (Slovenia) K Srebotnik	7	6

Semifinals
1	(Hungary) P Mandula (Austria) P Wartusch	6	4	6
(Italy) F Pennetta (Argentina) ME Salerni	1	6	4
3	(France) É Loit (Sweden) Å Svensson	6	6
2	(Slovenia) T Križan (Slovenia) K Srebotnik	4	2

Final
1	(Hungary) P Mandula (Austria) P Wartusch	3	1
3	(France) É Loit (Sweden) Å Svensson	6	6
