= 2003 If Stockholm Open – Singles =

Singles
- 2003 If Stockholm Open

Final
- Champion: (United States) Mardy Fish
- Runner-up: (Sweden) Robin Söderling
- Score: 7–5, 3–6, 7–6^{(7–4)}

Details
- Draw: 32
- Seeds: 8

Events
Singles	Doubles
- If Stockholm Open

Paradorn Srichaphan was the defending champion but lost in the first round to John van Lottum.

Mardy Fish won in the final 7–5, 3–6, 7–6^{(7–4)} against Robin Söderling.

== Seeds ==
1. (Thailand) Paradorn Srichaphan (first round)
2. (Netherlands) Sjeng Schalken (first round)
3. (Chile) Nicolás Massú (first round)
4. (Chile) Fernando González (second round)
5. (United States) Mardy Fish (champion)
6. (Argentina) Mariano Zabaleta (first round)
7. (South Africa) Wayne Ferreira (first round)
8. (Finland) Jarkko Nieminen (first round)

== Draw ==
Key

- Q = Qualifier
- WC = Wild card
- LL = Lucky loser
- Alt = Alternate
- ITF = ITF entry
- PR = Protected ranking
- SR = Special ranking
- SE = Special exempt
- JE = Junior exempt
- JR = Junior Accelerator Programme entrant
- CO = College Accelerator Programme entrant
- NG = Next Gen Accelerator Program entrant
- w/o = Walkover
- r = Retired
- d = Defaulted

=== Finals ===
Semifinals
WC	(Sweden) Robin Söderling	7^{7}	7^{7}
(Italy) Davide Sanguinetti	6^{2}	6^{5}
5	(United States) Mardy Fish	6	7
WC	(Sweden) Thomas Enqvist	4	5

Final
WC	(Sweden) Robin Söderling	5	6	6^{4}
5	(United States) Mardy Fish	7	3	7^{7}

=== Top half ===
First round
1	(Thailand) P Srichaphan	5	1
(Netherlands) J van Lottum	7	6
(Sweden) A Vinciguerra	6	2	1
(Sweden) J Björkman	4	6	6
(South Africa) W Moodie	6	3	3
WC	(Sweden) R Söderling	4	6	6
(Argentina) J I Chela	6	6
7	(South Africa) W Ferreira	4	2
4	(Chile) F González	3	6	6
(Slovakia) K Beck	6	1	1
WC	(Sweden) J Johansson	7	6
Q	(Norway) J F Andersen	5	3
(Italy) D Sanguinetti	5
(United States) J-M Gambill	4	r
(France) G Carraz	7^{7}	5	6
8	(Finland) J Nieminen	6^{5}	7	2

Second round
(Netherlands) J van Lottum	1	4
(Sweden) J Björkman	6	6
WC	(Sweden) R Söderling	6	6
(Argentina) J I Chela	4	3
4	(Chile) F González	6	4	5
WC	(Sweden) J Johansson	4	6	7
(Italy) D Sanguinetti	6	2	7
(France) G Carraz	3	6	5

Quarterfinals
(Sweden) J Björkman	4	3
WC	(Sweden) R Söderling	6	6
WC	(Sweden) J Johansson	3	2
(Italy) D Sanguinetti	6	6

Semifinals
WC	(Sweden) R Söderling	7^{7}	7^{7}
(Italy) D Sanguinetti	6^{2}	6^{5}

=== Bottom half ===
First round
5	(United States) M Fish	6	7^{7}
Q	(Australia) P Baccanello	4	6^{4}
(Austria) J Melzer	1	1
Q	(France) J Benneteau	6	6
(Croatia) M Ančić	6	6
(Croatia) I Karlović	3	2
(Netherlands) R Sluiter	6	3	7
3	(Chile) N Massú	3	6	5
6	(Argentina) M Zabaleta	2	4
(Denmark) K Carlsen	6
(Morocco) H Arazi	5	3
WC	(Sweden) T Enqvist	7	6
Q	(Belgium) K Vliegen	1	3
(United States) R Ginepri	6	6
(United States) T Dent	6	7
2	(Netherlands) S Schalken	3	5

Second round
5	(United States) M Fish	6	6
Q	(France) J Benneteau	4	4
(Croatia) M Ančić	6^{7}	6	7^{7}
(Netherlands) R Sluiter	7^{9}	4	6^{3}
(Denmark) K Carlsen	7^{7}	4	4
WC	(Sweden) T Enqvist	6^{4}	6	6
(United States) R Ginepri	6^{2}	7^{9}	6
(United States) T Dent	7^{7}	6^{7}	4

Quarterfinals
5	(United States) M Fish	6	6^{7}	7^{7}
(Croatia) M Ančić	4	7^{9}	6^{4}
WC	(Sweden) T Enqvist	6	6
(United States) R Ginepri	3	4

Semifinals
5	(United States) M Fish	6	7
WC	(Sweden) T Enqvist	4	5
