= 2003 Canada Masters – Doubles =

Doubles
- 2003 Canada Masters and the Rogers AT&T Cup
- 2002 Champions: (United States) Bob Bryan (United States) Mike Bryan

Final
- Champions: (India) Mahesh Bhupathi (Belarus) Max Mirnyi
- Runners-up: (Sweden) Jonas Björkman (Australia) Todd Woodbridge
- Score: 6–3, 7–6^{(7–4)}

Details
- Draw: 24
- Seeds: 8

Events
Singles	men	women
Doubles	men	women
- Canada Masters Rogers AT&T Cup

The 2003 Canada Masters doubles was the men's doubles event of the one hundred and fourteenth edition of the Canada Masters; a WTA Tier I tournament and the most prestigious men's tennis tournament held in Canada. Bob Bryan and Mike Bryan were the defending champions but lost in the semifinals to Jonas Björkman and Todd Woodbridge. Mahesh Bhupathi and Max Mirnyi won in the final 6–3, 7–6^{(7–4)} against Björkman and Woodbridge.

== Seeds ==
Champion seeds are indicated in bold text while text in italics indicates the round in which those seeds were eliminated. All eight seeded teams received byes to the second round.

1. (India) **Mahesh Bhupathi** / (Belarus) **Max Mirnyi (champions)**
2. (United States) Bob Bryan / (United States) Mike Bryan (semifinals)
3. (The Bahamas) Mark Knowles / (Canada) Daniel Nestor (second round)
4. (Sweden) Jonas Björkman / (Australia) Todd Woodbridge (final)
5. (India) Leander Paes / (Czech Republic) David Rikl (quarterfinals)
6. (Czech Republic) Martin Damm / (Czech Republic) Cyril Suk (semifinals)
7. (France) Michaël Llodra / (France) Fabrice Santoro (quarterfinals)
8. (Australia) Wayne Arthurs / (Australia) Paul Hanley (quarterfinals)

== Draw ==
Key

- Q = Qualifier
- WC = Wild card
- LL = Lucky loser
- Alt = Alternate
- ITF = ITF entry
- PR = Protected ranking
- SR = Special ranking
- SE = Special exempt
- JE = Junior exempt
- JR = Junior Accelerator Programme entrant
- CO = College Accelerator Programme entrant
- NG = Next Gen Accelerator Program entrant
- w/o = Walkover
- r = Retired
- d = Defaulted

=== Final ===
Final
1	(India) **Mahesh Bhupathi** (Belarus) **Max Mirnyi**	**6**	**7^{7}**
4	(Sweden) Jonas Björkman (Australia) Todd Woodbridge	3	6^{4}

=== Top half ===
First round
(Czech Republic) **F Čermák** (Czech Republic) **L Friedl**	4	**6**	**6**
ALT	(Morocco) Y El Aynaoui (Argentina) M Zabaleta	**6**	3	1
ALT	(Croatia) I Ljubičić (Spain) F López	**6**	4	4
(Czech Republic) **T Cibulec** (Czech Republic) **P Vízner**	3	**6**	**6**
(Zimbabwe) W Black (Zimbabwe) K Ullyett	**6**	5	6^{6}
(United States) **J Blake** (Australia) **J Eagle**	3	**7**	**7^{8}**
WC	(Canada) **F Niemeyer** (Russia) **M Youzhny**	2	**6**	**6**
(Spain) C Moyá (Serbia and Montenegro) N Zimonjić	**6**	1	3

Second round
1	(India) **M Bhupathi** (Belarus) **M Mirnyi**	**7^{7}**	**6**
(Czech Republic) F Čermák (Czech Republic) L Friedl	6^{5}	4
(Czech Republic) T Cibulec (Czech Republic) P Vízner	3	5
8	(Australia) **W Arthurs** (Australia) **P Hanley**	**6**	**7**
3	(The Bahamas) M Knowles (Canada) D Nestor	**7^{7}**	2	5
(United States) **J Blake** (Australia) **J Eagle**	6^{4}	**6**	**7**
(Canada) F Niemeyer (Russia) M Youzhny	4	6^{3}
6	(Czech Republic) **M Damm** (Czech Republic) **C Suk**	**6**	**7^{7}**

Quarterfinals
1	(India) **M Bhupathi** (Belarus) **M Mirnyi**	**7^{10}**	**7^{7}**
8	(Australia) W Arthurs (Australia) P Hanley	6^{8}	6^{5}
(United States) J Blake (Australia) J Eagle	2	**6**	4
6	(Czech Republic) **M Damm** (Czech Republic) **C Suk**	**6**	3	**6**

Semifinals
1	(India) **M Bhupathi** (Belarus) **M Mirnyi**	w/o
6	(Czech Republic) M Damm (Czech Republic) C Suk

=== Bottom half ===
First round
(Finland) **J Nieminen** (Thailand) **P Srichaphan**	**6**	**6**
(Argentina) A Calleri (Argentina) D Nalbandian	4	4
(Argentina) **G Etlis** (Argentina) **M Rodríguez**	3	**7^{7}**	**7^{7}**
(United States) D Johnson (Russia) Y Kafenikov	**6**	6^{5}	6^{3}
WC	(Canada) **F Dancevic** (Canada) **S Larose**	**6**	3	**7^{7}**
(Czech Republic) J Novák (Czech Republic) R Štěpánek	1	**6**	6^{5}
(Spain) **T Robredo** (Germany) **R Schüttler**	**6**	**6**
(South Africa) C Haggard (United States) G Oliver	4	4

Second round
7	(France) **M Llodra** (France) **F Santoro**	**7^{7}**	**6**
(Finland) J Nieminen (Thailand) P Srichaphan	6^{3}	4
(Argentina) G Etlis (Argentina) M Rodríguez	3	4
4	(Sweden) **J Björkman** (Australia) **T Woodbridge**	**6**	**6**
5	(India) **L Paes** (Czech Republic) **D Rikl**	4
(Canada) F Dancevic (Canada) S Larose	1^{r}
(Spain) T Robredo (Germany) R Schüttler	3	4
2	(United States) **B Bryan** (United States) **M Bryan**	**6**	**6**

Quarterfinals
7	(France) M Llodra (France) F Santoro	4	4
4	(Sweden) **J Björkman** (Australia) **T Woodbridge**	**6**	**6**
5	(India) L Paes (Czech Republic) D Rikl	3	4
2	(United States) **B Bryan** (United States) **M Bryan**	**6**	**6**

Semifinals
4	(Sweden) **J Björkman** (Australia) **T Woodbridge**	**7^{8}**	6^{4}	**7**
2	(United States) B Bryan (United States) M Bryan	6^{6}	**7^{7}**	5
