= 2003 Pacific Life Open – Men's doubles =

Men's doubles
- 2003 Pacific Life Open

Final
- Champions: (South Africa) Wayne Ferreira; (Russia) Yevgeny Kafelnikov
- Runners-up: (United States) Bob Bryan; (United States) Mike Bryan
- Score: 3–6, 7–5, 6–4

Events
| Singles | men | women |
| Doubles | men | women |
| ← 2002 · | Pacific Life Open | · 2004 → |

Mark Knowles and Daniel Nestor were the defending champions but lost in the quarterfinals to Leander Paes and David Rikl.

Wayne Ferreira and Yevgeny Kafelnikov won in the final 3–6, 7–5, 6–4 against Bob Bryan and Mike Bryan.

== Seeds ==
All eight seeded teams received byes to the second round.

1. (The Bahamas) Mark Knowles / (Canada) Daniel Nestor (quarterfinals)
2. (Sweden) Jonas Björkman / (Australia) Todd Woodbridge (semifinals)
3. (United States) Bob Bryan / (United States) Mike Bryan (final)
4. (United States) Donald Johnson / (United States) Jared Palmer (second round)
5. (Czech Republic) Martin Damm / (Czech Republic) Cyril Suk (quarterfinals)
6. (Switzerland) Roger Federer / (Belarus) Max Mirnyi (quarterfinals)
7. (France) Michaël Llodra / (France) Fabrice Santoro (second round)
8. (India) Leander Paes / (Czech Republic) David Rikl (semifinals)

== Draw ==
=== Key ===
- Q = Qualifier
- WC = Wild card
- LL = Lucky loser
- Alt = Alternate
- SE = Special exempt
- PR = Protected ranking
- ITF = ITF entry
- JE = Junior exempt
- w/o = Walkover
- r = Retired
- d = Defaulted
- SR = Special ranking

=== Final ===
Semifinals

Final

8
- (India) Leander Paes
- (Czech Republic) David Rikl
3
6^{6}

3
- (United States) Bob Bryan
- (United States) Mike Bryan
6
7^{8}

3
- (United States) Bob Bryan
- (United States) Mike Bryan
6
5
4

- (South Africa) Wayne Ferreira
- (Russia) Yevgeny Kafelnikov
3
7
6

- (South Africa) Wayne Ferreira
- (Russia) Yevgeny Kafelnikov
5
6
7

2
- (Sweden) Jonas Björkman
- (Australia) Todd Woodbridge
7
3
5

=== Top half ===
First round

Second round

Quarterfinals

Semifinals

1
- (The Bahamas) M Knowles
- (Canada) D Nestor
6
6

ALT
- (Czech Republic) P Pála
- (Argentina) M Rodríguez
6^{7}
1

WC
- (Russia) M Safin
- (Serbia and Montenegro) N Zimonjić
3
2

WC
- (Russia) M Safin
- (Serbia and Montenegro) N Zimonjić
7^{9}
6

1
- (The Bahamas) M Knowles
- (Canada) D Nestor
4
6^{4}

- (South Africa) D Adams
- (South Africa) R Koenig
5
3

8
- (India) L Paes
- (Czech Republic) D Rikl
6
7^{7}

- (India) M Bhupathi
- (United Kingdom) T Henman
7
6

- (India) M Bhupathi
- (United Kingdom) T Henman
2
6
2

8
- (India) L Paes
- (Czech Republic) D Rikl
6
3
6

8
- (India) L Paes
- (Czech Republic) D Rikl
3
6^{6}

3
- (United States) B Bryan
- (United States) M Bryan
6
7^{8}

3
- (United States) B Bryan
- (United States) M Bryan
6
4
6

- (Netherlands) S Schalken
- (Germany) R Schüttler
3
4

- (Australia) W Arthurs
- (Zimbabwe) K Ullyett
4
6
4

- (Australia) W Arthurs
- (Zimbabwe) K Ullyett
6
6

3
- (United States) B Bryan
- (United States) M Bryan
6
6

- (Argentina) G Etlis
- (Argentina) D Nalbandian
6
6

5
- (Czech Republic) M Damm
- (Czech Republic) C Suk
4
3

- (Belgium) X Malisse
- (Thailand) P Srichaphan
2
3

- (Argentina) G Etlis
- (Argentina) D Nalbandian
6^{5}
3

5
- (Czech Republic) M Damm
- (Czech Republic) C Suk
7^{7}
6

=== Bottom half ===
First round

Second round

Quarterfinals

Semifinals

7
- (France) M Llodra
- (France) F Santoro
6
1
4

- (South Africa) W Ferreira
- (Russia) Y Kafelnikov
6
6

- (South Africa) W Ferreira
- (Russia) Y Kafelnikov
3
6
6

- (Morocco) Y El Aynaoui
- (Chile) F González
3
3

- (South Africa) W Ferreira
- (Russia) Y Kafelnikov
7^{7}
4
7^{7}

WC
- (Croatia) M Ančić
- (United States) R Ginepri
4
4

- (Czech Republic) T Cibulec
- (Czech Republic) P Vízner
6^{1}
6
6^{1}

- (Czech Republic) T Cibulec
- (Czech Republic) P Vízner
6
6

- (Czech Republic) T Cibulec
- (Czech Republic) P Vízner
7
5
7^{8}

4
- (United States) D Johnson
- (United States) J Palmer
5
7
6^{6}

- (South Africa) W Ferreira
- (Russia) Y Kafelnikov
5
6
7

2
- (Sweden) J Björkman
- (Australia) T Woodbridge
7
3
5

6
- (Switzerland) R Federer
- (Belarus) M Mirnyi
6
6

- (Czech Republic) J Novák
- (Czech Republic) R Štěpánek
6^{7}
5

- (Australia) J Eagle
- (United States) B MacPhie
1
4

- (Australia) J Eagle
- (United States) B MacPhie
7^{9}
7

6
- (Switzerland) R Federer
- (Belarus) M Mirnyi
4
6
3

- (Argentina) L Arnold
- (United States) J-M Gambill
2
6
6^{4}

2
- (Sweden) J Björkman
- (Australia) T Woodbridge
6
4
6

- (Spain) À Corretja
- (Spain) À Costa
6
3
7^{7}

- (Spain) À Corretja
- (Spain) À Costa
4
7
2

2
- (Sweden) J Björkman
- (Australia) T Woodbridge
6
5
6
