= 2003 Italian Open – Men's doubles =

Men's doubles
- 2003 Italian Open

Final
- Champions: (Australia) Wayne Arthurs (Australia) Paul Hanley
- Runners-up: (France) Michaël Llodra (France) Fabrice Santoro
- Score: 6–1, 6–3

Events
Singles	men	women
Doubles	men	women
← 2002 ·	Italian Open	· 2004 →

Martin Damm and Cyril Suk were the defending champions but lost in the semifinals to Michaël Llodra and Fabrice Santoro.

Wayne Arthurs and Paul Hanley won in the final 6–1, 6–3 against Llodra and Santoro.

== Seeds ==
Champion seeds are indicated in bold text while text in italics indicates the round in which those seeds were eliminated. All eight seeded teams received byes to the second round.

1. (The Bahamas) Mark Knowles / (Canada) Daniel Nestor (quarterfinals)
2. (India) Mahesh Bhupathi / (Belarus) Max Mirnyi (semifinals)
3. (United States) Bob Bryan / (United States) Mike Bryan (second round)
4. (India) Leander Paes / (Czech Republic) David Rikl (second round)
5. (Czech Republic) Martin Damm / (Czech Republic) Cyril Suk (semifinals)
6. (Zimbabwe) Wayne Black / (Zimbabwe) Kevin Ullyett (second round)
7. (France) Michaël Llodra / (France) Fabrice Santoro (final)
8. (Australia) Joshua Eagle / (United States) Jared Palmer (quarterfinals)

== Draw ==
=== Key ===
- Q = Qualifier
- WC = Wild card
- LL = Lucky loser
- Alt = Alternate
- SE = Special exempt
- PR = Protected ranking
- ITF = ITF entry
- JE = Junior exempt
- w/o = Walkover
- r = Retired
- d = Defaulted
- SR = Special ranking

=== Final ===
Final

7
- (France) Michaël Llodra
- (France) Fabrice Santoro
1
3

- (Australia) **Wayne Arthurs**
- (Australia) **Paul Hanley**
**6**
**6**

=== Top half ===
First round

Second round

Quarterfinals

Semifinals

1
- (The Bahamas) **M Knowles**
- (Canada) **D Nestor**
**6**
**6**

- (Czech Republic) T Cibulec
- (Czech Republic) P Vízner
3
5

- (France) S Grosjean
- (United States) A Roddick
4
3

- (France) **S Grosjean**
- (United States) **A Roddick**
**6**
**7**

1
- (The Bahamas) M Knowles
- (Canada) D Nestor
2
**6**
6^{3}

- (South Africa) **D Adams**
- (Argentina) **M Hood**
**6**
**6**

5
- (Czech Republic) **M Damm**
- (Czech Republic) **C Suk**
**6**
3
**7^{7}**

- (Czech Republic) J Novák
- (Czech Republic) R Štěpánek
4
4

- (South Africa) D Adams
- (Argentina) M Hood
4
3

5
- (Czech Republic) **M Damm**
- (Czech Republic) **C Suk**
**6**
**6**

5
- (Czech Republic) M Damm
- (Czech Republic) C Suk
5
**6**
3

7
- (France) **M Llodra**
- (France) **F Santoro**
**7**
4
**6**

3
- (United States) B Bryan
- (United States) M Bryan
4
**6**
1

- (South Africa) **W Ferreira**
- (Russia) **Y Kafelnikov**
3
**6**
**6**

- (South Africa) **W Ferreira**
- (Russia) **Y Kafelnikov**
**6**
3
**6**

- (United States) J-M Gambill
- (United States) G Oliver
**6**
3
4

- (South Africa) W Ferreira
- (Russia) Y Kafelnikov
3
2

- (United States) D Johnson
- (United States) B MacPhie
**7^{8}**
3
4

7
- (France) **M Llodra**
- (France) **F Santoro**
**6**
**6**

- (South Africa) **C Haggard**
- (South Africa) **R Koenig**
6^{6}
**6**
**6**

- (South Africa) C Haggard
- (South Africa) R Koenig
2
3

7
- (France) **M Llodra**
- (France) **F Santoro**
**6**
**6**

=== Bottom half ===
First round

Second round

Quarterfinals

Semifinals

6
- (Zimbabwe) W Black
- (Zimbabwe) K Ullyett
6^{6}
3

- (Australia) **W Arthurs**
- (Australia) **P Hanley**
**6**
**7**

- (Australia) **W Arthurs**
- (Australia) **P Hanley**
**7^{8}**
**6**

- (Argentina) G Etlis
- (Netherlands) S Schalken
3
5

- (Australia) **W Arthurs**
- (Australia) **P Hanley**
**6**
**7^{9}**

ALT
- (Italy) A Seppi
- (Italy) P Starace
3
4

- (Switzerland) R Federer
- (Thailand) P Srichaphan
3
6^{7}

- (Switzerland) **R Federer**
- (Thailand) **P Srichaphan**
**6**
**6**

- (Switzerland) **R Federer**
- (Thailand) **P Srichaphan**
**6**
**6**

4
- (India) L Paes
- (Czech Republic) D Rikl
4
3

- (Australia) **W Arthurs**
- (Australia) **P Hanley**
**7^{8}**
**6**

2
- (India) M Bhupathi
- (Belarus) M Mirnyi
6^{6}
3

8
- (Australia) **J Eagle**
- (United States) **J Palmer**
**7**
**7^{7}**

WC
- (Italy) M Bertolini
- (Italy) G Galimberti
5
**6**
0

WC
- (Brazil) G Kuerten
- (United Kingdom) T Henman
5
6^{5}

WC
- (United Kingdom) **T Henman**
- (Brazil) **G Kuerten**
**7**
4
**6**

8
- (Australia) J Eagle
- (United States) J Palmer
1
**7^{7}**
4

- (Argentina) **A Calleri**
- (Argentina) **G Coria**
3
**6**
**6**

2
- (India) **M Bhupathi**
- (Belarus) **M Mirnyi**
**6**
6^{4}
**6**

- (Czech Republic) F Čermák
- (Czech Republic) L Friedl
**6**
3
4

- (Argentina) A Calleri
- (Argentina) G Coria
6^{2}
6^{6}

2
- (India) **M Bhupathi**
- (Belarus) **M Mirnyi**
**7^{7}**
**7^{8}**
