= 2003 Italian Open – Women's singles =

2003 tennis matches

Women's singles
- 2003 Italian Open

Final
- Champion: (Belgium) Kim Clijsters
- Runner-up: (France) Amélie Mauresmo
- Score: 3–6, 7–6^{(7–3)}, 6–0

Details
- Draw: 56
- Seeds: 16

Events
Singles	men	women
Doubles	men	women
← 2002 ·	Italian Open	· 2004 →

Kim Clijsters defeated Amélie Mauresmo in the final, 3–6, 7–6^{(7–3)}, 6–0 to win the women's singles tennis title at the 2003 Italian Open. It was her third title of the season, and the 13th overall in her career.

Serena Williams was the defending champion, but lost in semifinals to Mauresmo.

== Seeds ==
The first eight seeds received a bye into the second round.

1. (United States) Serena Williams (semifinals)
2. (Belgium) Kim Clijsters (champion)
3. (Belgium) ~~Justine Henin-Hardenne~~ (withdrew due to left knee tendinitis)
4. (France) Amélie Mauresmo (final)
5. (United States) Jennifer Capriati (quarterfinals)
6. (United States) Chanda Rubin (second round)
7. (Slovakia) Daniela Hantuchová (third round)
8. (Russia) Anastasia Myskina (quarterfinals)
9. (Federal Republic of Yugoslavia) Jelena Dokic (first round)
10. (United States) Monica Seles (second round)
11. (Bulgaria) Magdalena Maleeva (second round)
12. (Greece) Eleni Daniilidou (second round)
13. (Japan) Ai Sugiyama (semifinals)
14. (South Africa) Amanda Coetzer (second round)
15. (United States) Meghann Shaughnessy (first round)
16. (Israel) Anna Pistolesi (third round)
17. (Switzerland) Patty Schnyder (third round)

== Draw ==
=== Key ===
- Q = Qualifier
- WC = Wild card
- LL = Lucky loser
- Alt = Alternate
- ITF = ITF entry
- PR = Protected ranking
- SR = Special ranking
- SE = Special exempt
- JE = Junior exempt
- JR = Junior Accelerator Programme entrant
- CO = College Accelerator Programme entrant
- NG = Next Gen Accelerator Program entrant
- w/o = Walkover
- r = Retired
- d = Defaulted

=== Finals ===
Quarterfinals
1	(United States) Serena Williams	7	6
(Spain) Conchita Martínez	5	2
4	(France) Amélie Mauresmo	6	7^{12}
5	(United States) Jennifer Capriati	3	6^{10}
Q	(Slovenia) Tina Pisnik	1	3
13	(Japan) Ai Sugiyama	6	6
8	(Russia) Anastasia Myskina	2	2
2	(Belgium) Kim Clijsters	6	6

Semifinals
1	(United States) Serena Williams	6	5	3
4	(France) Amélie Mauresmo	1	7	6
13	(Japan) Ai Sugiyama	3	2
2	(Belgium) Kim Clijsters	6	6

Final
4	(France) Amélie Mauresmo	6	6^{3}	0
2	(Belgium) Kim Clijsters	3	7^{7}	6

=== Top half ===
==== Section 1 ====
First round
PR	(Spain) A Medina Garrigues	5	4
Q	(Czech Republic) K Koukalová	7	6
Q	(United States) A Harkleroad	6	3	2
(France) N Dechy	1	6	6
(Uzbekistan) I Tulyaganova	6	3	0
14	(South Africa) A Coetzer	2	6	6
9	(Federal Republic of Yugoslavia) J Dokic	4	6	5
(Spain) C Martínez	6	3	7
WC	(Switzerland) E Gagliardi	7	2	7
Q	(Federal Republic of Yugoslavia) J Janković	5	6	5
(Spain) M Serna	4	6	6
(Russia) E Likhovtseva	6	2	0

Second round
1	(United States) S Williams	6	6
Q	(Czech Republic) K Koukalová	4	3
(France) N Dechy	2	7^{7}	7^{7}
14	(South Africa) A Coetzer	6	6^{4}	6^{4}
(Spain) C Martínez	6	6
WC	(Switzerland) E Gagliardi	4	3
(Spain) M Serna	6^{4}	6	4
7	(Slovakia) D Hantuchová	7^{7}	1	6

Third round
1	(United States) S Williams	6	6
(France) N Dechy	3	0
(Spain) C Martínez	6	6
7	(Slovakia) D Hantuchová	3	3

Quarterfinals
1	(United States) S Williams	7	6
(Spain) C Martínez	5	2

==== Section 2 ====
First round
PR	(Russia) L Krasnoroutskaya	6	6
Q	(Belgium) E Callens	4	4
WC	(Italy) F Pennetta	6	3	6
(Argentina) C Fernández	4	6	0
Q	(Ukraine) E Tatarkova	0	4
16	(Israel) A Pistolesi	6	6
10	(United States) M Seles	4	6	6
(Switzerland) M Casanova	6	2	3
PR	(Russia) N Petrova	6	6
WC	(Italy) T Garbin	4	1
(United States) A Stevenson	1	1
Q	(Colombia) F Zuluaga	6	6

Second round
4	(France) A Mauresmo	6	7^{7}
PR	(Russia) L Krasnoroutskaya	2	6^{5}
WC	(Italy) F Pennetta	4	6^{4}
16	(Israel) A Pistolesi	6	7^{7}
10	(United States) M Seles	3	1^{r}
PR	(Russia) N Petrova	6	4
Q	(Colombia) F Zuluaga	3	4
5	(United States) J Capriati	6	6

Third round
4	(France) A Mauresmo	6	6
16	(Israel) A Pistolesi	0	3
PR	(Russia) N Petrova	5	3
5	(United States) J Capriati	7	6

Quarterfinals
4	(France) A Mauresmo	6	7^{12}
5	(United States) J Capriati	3	6^{10}

=== Bottom half ===
==== Section 3 ====
First round
LL	(France) É Loit	6	7^{7}
(Czech Republic) D Chládková	3	6^{1}
Q	(Italy) Ad Serra Zanetti	0	4
Q	(Slovenia) T Pisnik	6	6
(Italy) S Farina Elia	4	4
11	(Bulgaria) M Maleeva	6	6
13	(Japan) A Sugiyama	6	6
(Argentina) P Suárez	3	2
(Slovenia) K Srebotnik	1	6	5
Q	(Russia) D Safina	6	3	7
(Austria) B Schett	6	6
WC	(Italy) An Serra Zanetti	4	0

Second round
6	(United States) C Rubin	2	6	3
LL	(France) É Loit	6	1	6
Q	(Slovenia) T Pisnik	4	6	7
11	(Bulgaria) M Maleeva	6	4	5
13	(Japan) A Sugiyama	6	2	6
Q	(Russia) D Safina	0	6	4
(Austria) B Schett	0	2
17	(Switzerland) P Schnyder	6	6

Third round
LL	(France) É Loit	6	4	1
Q	(Slovenia) T Pisnik	2	6	6
13	(Japan) A Sugiyama	6	6
17	(Switzerland) P Schnyder	2	1

Quarterfinals
Q	(Slovenia) T Pisnik	1	3
13	(Japan) A Sugiyama	6	6

==== Section 4 ====
First round
(Slovenia) M Matevžič	6	3	6
(Italy) F Schiavone	3	6	3
(Switzerland) MG Mikaelian	3	2
(Russia) S Kuznetsova	6	6
Q	(United States) S Reeves	2	4
12	(Greece) E Daniilidou	6	6
15	(United States) M Shaughnessy	5	3
(United States) L Granville	7	6
Q	(Zimbabwe) C Black	6	7
(Italy) R Grande	3	5
(Spain) V Ruano Pascual	6	6
Q	(United States) M Tu	4	4

Second round
8	(Russia) A Myskina	6	6
(Slovenia) M Matevžič	2	3
(Russia) S Kuznetsova	6	6
12	(Greece) E Daniilidou	3	2
(United States) L Granville	5	6	4
Q	(Zimbabwe) C Black	7	1	6
(Spain) V Ruano Pascual	1	0
2	(Belgium) K Clijsters	6	6

Third round
8	(Russia) A Myskina	6	7
(Russia) S Kuznetsova	4	5
Q	(Zimbabwe) C Black	0	3
2	(Belgium) K Clijsters	6	6

Quarterfinals
8	(Russia) A Myskina	2	2
2	(Belgium) K Clijsters	6	6
