= 2003 BNP Paribas Masters =

- Date: 27 October – 2 November
- Edition: 31st
- Category: ATP Masters Series
- Draw: 64S / 16D
- Prize money: $2,200,000
- Surface: Carpet / Indoor
- Location: Paris, France
- Venue: Palais omnisports de Paris-Bercy

Champions

Singles
- (United Kingdom) Tim Henman

Doubles
- (Australia) Wayne Arthurs / (Australia) Paul Hanley
- Paris Masters

The 2003 BNP Paribas Masters was a men's tennis tournament played on indoor carpet courts. It was the 31st edition of the Paris Masters and was part of the Tennis Masters Series of the 2003 ATP Tour. It took place at the Palais Omnisports de Paris-Bercy in Paris in France from 27 October through 2 November 2003. Unseeded Tim Henman won the singles title.

== Tournament review ==
Tim Henman won the men's singles title to claim his debut Masters Series title, and what ultimately proved to be the last of 11 titles Henman won during his career. He beat Nikolay Davydenko, Sébastien Grosjean, Gustavo Kuerten, Roger Federer, and Andy Roddick en route to victory against Andrei Pavel in the final.

Andy Roddick's performance in reaching the semi-finals lifted him to No. 1 in the rankings. Despite his loss to Henman he gained the top spot from Juan Carlos Ferrero, who lost to Jiří Novák earlier in the competition. He became the fourth youngest male player to reach number one.

David Nalbandian secured the final place in the Tennis Masters Cup even though he did not play at the event. Paradorn Srichaphan, the only player who could beat him to eighth place in the rankings, lost in the third round.

== Finals ==
=== Singles ===
(United Kingdom) Tim Henman defeated (Romania) Andrei Pavel 6–2, 7–6^{(8–6)}, 7–6^{(7–2)}

- It was Henman's 2nd title of the year and the 11th of his career. It was his 1st Masters Series title.

=== Doubles ===
(Australia) Wayne Arthurs / (Australia) Paul Hanley defeated (France) Michaël Llodra / (France) Fabrice Santoro 6–3, 1–6, 6–3

- It was Arthurs' 4th title of the year and the 10th of his career. It was Hanley's 5th title of the year and the 6th of his career.
