= 2003 BNP Paribas Masters – Doubles =

Doubles
- 2003 BNP Paribas Masters
- 2002 Champions: (France) Nicolas Escudé (France) Fabrice Santoro

Final
- Champions: (Australia) Wayne Arthurs (Australia) Paul Hanley
- Runners-up: (France) Michaël Llodra (France) Fabrice Santoro
- Score: 6–3, 1–6, 6–3

Details
- Draw: 16
- Seeds: 4

Events
Singles	Doubles
← 2002 ·	BNP Paribas Masters	· 2004 →

Nicolas Escudé and Fabrice Santoro were the defending champions but only Santoro competed that year with Michaël Llodra.

Llodra and Santoro lost in the final 6–3, 1–6, 6–3 against Wayne Arthurs and Paul Hanley.

== Seeds ==
Champion seeds are indicated in bold text while text in italics indicates the round in which those seeds were eliminated.

1. (United States) Bob Bryan / (United States) Mike Bryan (first round)
2. (Sweden) Jonas Björkman / (Australia) Todd Woodbridge (semifinals)
3. (The Bahamas) Mark Knowles / (Canada) Daniel Nestor (semifinals)
4. (France) Michaël Llodra / (France) Fabrice Santoro (final)

== Draw ==
=== Key ===
- Q = Qualifier
- WC = Wild card
- LL = Lucky loser
- Alt = Alternate
- SE = Special exempt
- PR = Protected ranking
- ITF = ITF entry
- JE = Junior exempt
- w/o = Walkover
- r = Retired
- d = Defaulted
- SR = Special ranking

First round
1	(United States) B Bryan (United States) M Bryan	6^{3}	3
(Zimbabwe) **W Black** (Zimbabwe) **K Ullyett**	**7^{7}**	**6**
(Spain) T Robredo (Germany) R Schüttler	3	4
(Australia) **W Arthurs** (Australia) **P Hanley**	**6**	**6**
3	(The Bahamas) **M Knowles** (Canada) **D Nestor**	**6**	**6**
(Argentina) A Calleri (Chile) N Massú	1	4
(United States) J Palmer (Czech Republic) D Rikl	**6**	3	1
(Argentina) **G Etlis** (Argentina) **M Rodríguez**	4	**6**	**6**
WC	(France) J Benneteau (France) N Mahut	**7^{7}**	4	1^{r}
WC	(Spain) **À Corretja** (Spain) **F López**	6^{5}	**6**	3
(Czech Republic) M Damm (Czech Republic) C Suk	6^{5}	6^{4}
4	(France) **M Llodra** (France) **F Santoro**	**7^{7}**	**7^{7}**
(United States) M Fish (Belarus) M Mirnyi	2	6^{9}
(South Africa) **C Haggard** (Czech Republic) **P Vízner**	**6**	**7^{11}**
(Argentina) L Arnold (Argentina) G Coria	3	0^{r}
2	(Sweden) **J Björkman** (Australia) **T Woodbridge**	**6**	1

Quarterfinals
(Zimbabwe) W Black (Zimbabwe) K Ullyett	6^{3}	3
(Australia) **W Arthurs** (Australia) **P Hanley**	**7^{7}**	**6**
3	(The Bahamas) **M Knowles** (Canada) **D Nestor**	**6**	**6**
(Argentina) G Etlis (Argentina) M Rodríguez	3	4
WC	(Spain) À Corretja (Spain) F López	0	3
4	(France) **M Llodra** (France) **F Santoro**	**6**	**6**
(South Africa) C Haggard (Czech Republic) P Vízner	6^{2}	4
2	(Sweden) **J Björkman** (Australia) **T Woodbridge**	**7^{7}**	**6**

Semifinals
(Australia) **W Arthurs** (Australia) **P Hanley**	**7^{9}**	**7^{7}**
3	(The Bahamas) M Knowles (Canada) D Nestor	6^{7}	6^{4}
4	(France) **M Llodra** (France) **F Santoro**	**7^{7}**	2	**6**
2	(Sweden) J Björkman (Australia) T Woodbridge	6^{4}	**6**	2

Final
(Australia) **W Arthurs** (Australia) **P Hanley**	**6**	1	**6**
4	(France) M Llodra (France) F Santoro	3	**6**	3
