= 2003 Davidoff Swiss Indoors =

- Date: 20–26 October
- Edition: 34th
- Category: International Series
- Draw: 32S / 16D
- Prize money: $975,000
- Surface: Carpet / indoor
- Location: Basel, Switzerland
- Venue: St. Jakobshalle

Champions

Singles
- (Argentina) Guillermo Coria

Doubles
- (The Bahamas) Mark Knowles / (Canada) Daniel Nestor
← 2002 ·	Swiss Indoors	· 2004 →

The 2003 Davidoff Swiss Indoors was a men's tennis tournament played on indoor carpet courts at the St. Jakobshalle in Basel in Switzerland and was part of the International Series of the 2003 ATP Tour. The tournament ran from 20 October through 26 October 2003. Unseeded Guillermo Coria won the singles title.

== Finals ==
=== Singles ===
(Argentina) Guillermo Coria defeated (Argentina) David Nalbandian by walkover

- It was Coria's 5th title of the year and the 6th of his career.

=== Doubles ===
(The Bahamas) Mark Knowles / (Canada) Daniel Nestor defeated (Argentina) Lucas Arnold / (Argentina) Mariano Hood 6–4, 6–2

- It was Knowles' 6th title of the year and the 30th of his career. It was Nestor's 6th title of the year and the 32nd of his career.
