= 2003 CA-TennisTrophy =

- Date: 6–12 October
- Edition: 29th
- Category: International Series Gold
- Draw: 32S / 16D
- Prize money: $665,000
- Surface: Hard / indoor
- Location: Vienna, Austria
- Venue: Wiener Stadthalle

Champions

Singles
- (Switzerland) Roger Federer

Doubles
- (Switzerland) Yves Allegro / (Switzerland) Roger Federer
- Vienna Open

The 2003 CA-TennisTrophy was a men's tennis tournament played on indoor hard courts at the Wiener Stadthalle in Vienna in Austria and was part of the International Series Gold of the 2003 ATP Tour. It was the 29th edition of the tournament and took place from 6 October until 12 October 2003. First-seeded Roger Federer won the singles title.

== Finals ==
=== Singles ===
(Switzerland) Roger Federer defeated (Spain) Carlos Moyá 6–3, 6–3, 6–3

- It was Federer's 7th title of the year and the 15th of his career.

=== Doubles ===
(Switzerland) Yves Allegro / (Switzerland) Roger Federer defeated (India) Mahesh Bhupathi / (Belarus) Max Mirnyi 7–6^{(9–7)}, 7–5

- It was Allegro's only title of the year and the 1st of his career. It was Federer's 8th title of the year and the 16th of his career.
