= 2003 Gerry Weber Open =

- Date: 9–15 June
- Edition: 11th
- Category: International Series
- Draw: 32S / 16D
- Prize money: $775,000
- Surface: Grass / outdoor
- Location: Halle, Germany
- Venue: Gerry Weber Stadion

Champions

Singles
- (Switzerland) Roger Federer

Doubles
- (Sweden) Jonas Björkman / (Australia) Todd Woodbridge
- Gerry Weber Open

The 2003 Gerry Weber Open was a men's tennis tournament played on grass courts at the Gerry Weber Stadion in Halle, North Rhine-Westphalia in Germany that was part of the International Series of the 2003 ATP Tour. It was the 11th edition of the tournament and was held from 9 June until 15 June 2003. First-seeded Roger Federer won the singles title.

== Finals ==
=== Singles ===
(Switzerland) Roger Federer defeated (Germany) Nicolas Kiefer 6–1, 6–3

- It was Federer's 4th singles title of the year and the 8th of his career.

=== Doubles ===
(Sweden) Jonas Björkman / (Australia) Todd Woodbridge defeated (Czech Republic) Martin Damm / (Czech Republic) Cyril Suk 6–3, 6–4

- It was Björkman's 1st title of the year and the 35th of his career. It was Woodbridge's 1st title of the year and the 77th of his career.
