= 2003 Mutua Madrileña Masters Madrid – Doubles =

Doubles
- 2003 Mutua Madrileña Masters Madrid
- 2002 Champions: (The Bahamas) Mark Knowles (Canada) Daniel Nestor

Final
- Champions: (India) Mahesh Bhupathi (Belarus) Max Mirnyi
- Runners-up: (Zimbabwe) Wayne Black (Zimbabwe) Kevin Ullyett
- Score: 6–2, 2–6, 6–3

Events
Singles	Doubles
← 2002 ·	Mutua Madrileña Masters Madrid	· 2004 →

Mark Knowles and Daniel Nestor were the defending champions but lost in the quarterfinals to Wayne Black and Kevin Ullyett.

Mahesh Bhupathi and Max Mirnyi won in the final 6–2, 2–6, 6–3 against Black and Ullyett.

== Seeds ==
Champion seeds are indicated in bold text while text in italics indicates the round in which those seeds were eliminated.

1. (United States) Bob Bryan / (United States) Mike Bryan (first round)
2. (India) **Mahesh Bhupathi** / (Belarus) **Max Mirnyi (champions)**
3. (Sweden) Jonas Björkman / (Australia) Todd Woodbridge (quarterfinals)
4. (The Bahamas) Mark Knowles / (Canada) Daniel Nestor (quarterfinals)

== Draw ==
=== Key ===
- Q = Qualifier
- WC = Wild card
- LL = Lucky loser
- Alt = Alternate
- SE = Special exempt
- PR = Protected ranking
- ITF = ITF entry
- JE = Junior exempt
- w/o = Walkover
- r = Retired
- d = Defaulted
- SR = Special ranking

First round
1	(United States) B Bryan (United States) M Bryan	**7^{9}**	4	4
(United States) **J Palmer** (Czech Republic) **D Rikl**	6^{7}	**6**	**6**
(Czech Republic) **M Damm** (Czech Republic) **C Suk**	**6**	**6**
(United States) M Fish (United States) A Roddick	3	3
4	(The Bahamas) **M Knowles** (Canada) **D Nestor**	**7^{7}**	**6**
WC	(Spain) C Moyá (Spain) F Vicente	6^{5}	4
(Zimbabwe) **W Black** (Zimbabwe) **K Ullyett**	**6**	**6**
(South Africa) C Haggard (Australia) P Hanley	4	4
(South Africa) J Coetzee (Argentina) M Hood	**6**	6^{5}	4
(Spain) **A Costa** (Netherlands) **M Verkerk**	4	**7^{7}**	**6**
(Argentina) A Calleri (Spain) T Robredo	3	1
3	(Sweden) **J Björkman** (Australia) **T Woodbridge**	**6**	**6**
(Argentina) G Etlis (Argentina) M Rodríguez	4	6^{3}
(Czech Republic) **J Novák** (Czech Republic) **P Vízner**	**6**	**7^{7}**
WC	(Spain) À Corretja (Spain) F López	**7^{7}**	4	6^{4}
2	(India) **M Bhupathi** (Belarus) **M Mirnyi**	6^{2}	**6**	**7^{7}**

Quarterfinals
(United States) **J Palmer** (Czech Republic) **D Rikl**	**6**	4	**7^{7}**
(Czech Republic) M Damm (Czech Republic) C Suk	3	**6**	6^{4}
4	(The Bahamas) M Knowles (Canada) D Nestor	1	**7^{7}**	3
(Zimbabwe) **W Black** (Zimbabwe) **K Ullyett**	**6**	6^{5}	**6**
(Spain) **A Costa** (Netherlands) **M Verkerk**	**6**	**7^{7}**
3	(Sweden) J Björkman (Australia) T Woodbridge	4	6^{4}
(Czech Republic) J Novák (Czech Republic) P Vízner	**7^{7}**	6^{5}	3
2	(India) **M Bhupathi** (Belarus) **M Mirnyi**	6^{4}	**7^{7}**	**6**

Semifinals
(United States) J Palmer (Czech Republic) D Rikl	4	4
(Zimbabwe) **W Black** (Zimbabwe) **K Ullyett**	**6**	**6**
(Spain) A Costa (Netherlands) M Verkerk	6^{5}	**6**	2
2	(India) **M Bhupathi** (Belarus) **M Mirnyi**	**7^{7}**	4	**6**

Final
(Zimbabwe) Wayne Black (Zimbabwe) Kevin Ullyett	2	**6**	3
2	(India) **Mahesh Bhupathi** (Belarus) **Max Mirnyi**	**6**	2	**6**
