= 2003 Canada Masters and the Rogers AT&T Cup =

2003 Canada Masters
- Date: August 4–10 (men); August 11–17 (women)
- Edition: 114th
- Surface: Hard / outdoor

Champions

Men's singles
- (United States) Andy Roddick

Women's singles
- (Belgium) Justine Henin-Hardenne

Men's doubles
- (India) Mahesh Bhupathi / (Belarus) Max Mirnyi

Women's doubles
- (Russia) Svetlana Kuznetsova / (United States) Martina Navratilova
- Canadian Open

The 2003 Canada Masters and the Rogers AT&T Cup were tennis tournaments played on outdoor hard courts. It was the 114th edition of the Canada Masters and was part of the Tennis Masters Series of the 2003 ATP Tour and of Tier I of the 2003 WTA Tour. The men's tournament took place at the du Maurier Stadium in Montreal in Canada from August 4 through August 10, 2003 while the women's event took place at the National Tennis Centre in Toronto in Canada from August 11 through August 17, 2003.

On the men's side were present World No. 1, Australian Open and Miami champion Andre Agassi, French Open and Monte Carlo winner Juan Carlos Ferrero and Wimbledon champion Roger Federer. Other top seeds competing were recent Umag winner Carlos Moyá, Indian Wells champion Lleyton Hewitt, Andy Roddick, Guillermo Coria and Rainer Schüttler.

The women's field was led by new World No. 1, French Open, Indian Wells, Rome and recent Los Angeles champion Kim Clijsters, Charleston and Berlin winner Justine Henin-Hardenne and Warsaw champion Amélie Mauresmo. Among other seeds were Australian Open quarterfinalist Daniela Hantuchová, Doha champion Anastasia Myskina, Magdalena Maleeva, Amanda Coetzer and Jelena Dokić.

== Finals ==
=== Men's singles ===
(United States) Andy Roddick defeated (Argentina) David Nalbandian 6–1, 6–3

- It was Roddick's 4th title of the year and the 11th of his career. It was his 1st career Masters title.

=== Women's singles ===
(Belgium) Justine Henin-Hardenne defeated (Russia) Lina Krasnoroutskaya 6–1, 6–0

- It was Henin-Hardenne's 6th title of the year and the 14th of her career. It was her 3rd Tier I title of the year and her 4th overall.

=== Men's doubles ===
(India) Mahesh Bhupathi / (Belarus) Max Mirnyi defeated (Sweden) Jonas Björkman / (Australia) Todd Woodbridge 6–3, 7–6^{(7–4)}

- It was Bhupathi's 3rd title of the year and the 29th of his career. It was Mirnyi's 5th title of the year and the 18th of his career.

=== Women's doubles ===
(Russia) Svetlana Kuznetsova / (United States) Martina Navratilova defeated (Venezuela) María Vento-Kabchi / (Indonesia) Angelique Widjaja 3–6, 6–1, 6–1

- It was Kuznetsova's 4th title of the year and the 9th of her career. It was Navrátilová's 5th title of the year and the 346th of her career.
