= 2003 Hamburg Masters – Doubles =

Doubles
- 2003 Hamburg Masters
- 2002 Champions: (India) Mahesh Bhupathi (United States) Jan-Michael Gambill

Final
- Champions: (The Bahamas) Mark Knowles (Canada) Daniel Nestor
- Runners-up: (India) Mahesh Bhupathi (Belarus) Max Mirnyi
- Score: 6–4, 7–6^{(12–10)}

Details
- Draw: 24 (2WC)
- Seeds: 8

Events
Singles	Doubles
- Hamburg Masters

The 2003 Hamburg Masters doubles was a German tennis event.

Mahesh Bhupathi and Jan-Michael Gambill were the defending champions but they competed with different partners that year, Bhupathi with Max Mirnyi and Gambill with Graydon Oliver.

Gambill and Oliver lost in the first round to Gustavo Kuerten and Tim Henman.

Bhupathi and Mirnyi lost in the final 6–4, 7–6^{(12–10)} against Mark Knowles and Daniel Nestor.

== Seeds ==
Champion seeds are indicated in bold text while text in italics indicates the round in which those seeds were eliminated. All eight seeded teams received byes to the second round.

1. (The Bahamas) **Mark Knowles** / (Canada) **Daniel Nestor (champions)**
2. (India) Mahesh Bhupathi / (Belarus) Max Mirnyi (final)
3. (United States) Bob Bryan / (United States) Mike Bryan (semifinals)
4. (Sweden) Jonas Björkman / (Australia) Todd Woodbridge (quarterfinals)
5. (India) Leander Paes / (Czech Republic) David Rikl (semifinals)
6. (Zimbabwe) Wayne Black / (Zimbabwe) Kevin Ullyett (second round)
7. (Czech Republic) Martin Damm / (Czech Republic) Cyril Suk (quarterfinals)
8. (France) ~~Michaël Llodra / (France) Fabrice Santoro~~ (withdrew)

== Draw ==
Key

- Q = Qualifier
- WC = Wild card
- LL = Lucky loser
- Alt = Alternate
- ITF = ITF entry
- PR = Protected ranking
- SR = Special ranking
- SE = Special exempt
- JE = Junior exempt
- JR = Junior Accelerator Programme entrant
- CO = College Accelerator Programme entrant
- NG = Next Gen Accelerator Program entrant
- w/o = Walkover
- r = Retired
- d = Defaulted

=== Final ===
Final

1
- (The Bahamas) **Mark Knowles**
- (Canada) **Daniel Nestor**
**6**
**7^{12}**

2
- (India) Mahesh Bhupathi
- (Belarus) Max Mirnyi
4
6^{10}

=== Top half ===
First round

Second round

Quarterfinals

Semifinals

1
- (The Bahamas) **M Knowles**
- (Canada) **D Nestor**
**7**
**6**

- (United States) M Fish
- (United States) A Roddick
2
**6**
6^{4}

- (Czech Republic) F Čermák
- (Czech Republic) L Friedl
5
3

- (Czech Republic) **F Čermák**
- (Czech Republic) **L Friedl**
**6**
4
**7^{7}**

1
- (The Bahamas) **M Knowles**
- (Canada) **D Nestor**
6^{2}
**7^{7}**
**6**

- (United States) J-M Gambill
- (United States) G Oliver
4
2

ALT
- (Australia) W Arthurs
- (Australia) P Hanley
**7^{7}**
6^{2}
4

- (United Kingdom) **T Henman**
- (Brazil) **G Kuerten**
**6**
**6**

- (United Kingdom) T Henman
- (Brazil) G Kuerten
**7^{8}**
4
6^{6}

ALT
- (Australia) **W Arthurs**
- (Australia) **P Hanley**
6^{6}
**6**
**7^{8}**

1
- (The Bahamas) **M Knowles**
- (Canada) **D Nestor**
**6**
**6**

5
- (India) L Paes
- (Czech Republic) D Rikl
3
4

4
- (Sweden) **J Björkman**
- (Australia) **T Woodbridge**
**7^{7}**
**7**

- (Finland) **J Nieminen**
- (Thailand) **P Srichaphan**
**6**
**6**

- (Finland) J Nieminen
- (Thailand) P Srichaphan
6^{5}
5

- (South Africa) C Haggard
- (South Africa) R Koenig
3
4

4
- (Sweden) J Björkman
- (Australia) T Woodbridge
5
**7^{7}**
1

- (Australia) **J Eagle**
- (United States) **J Palmer**
**6**
**7^{7}**

5
- (India) **L Paes**
- (Czech Republic) **D Rikl**
**7**
6^{3}
**6**

- (South Africa) D Adams
- (Argentina) G Etlis
3
6^{2}

- (Australia) J Eagle
- (United States) J Palmer
3
3

5
- (India) **L Paes**
- (Czech Republic) **D Rikl**
**6**
**6**

=== Bottom half ===
First round

Second round

Quarterfinals

Semifinals

7
- (Czech Republic) **M Damm**
- (Czech Republic) **C Suk**
**6**
4
**6**

- (France) A Clément
- (France) S Grosjean
3
4
r

- (Argentina) G Gaudio
- (Argentina) D Nalbandian
1
**6**
1

- (Argentina) **G Gaudio**
- (Argentina) **D Nalbandian**
**6**
**2**

7
- (Czech Republic) M Damm
- (Czech Republic) C Suk
**7^{9}**
6^{6}
5

- (Czech Republic) J Novák
- (Czech Republic) R Štěpánek
6^{5}
4

3
- (United States) **B Bryan**
- (United States) **M Bryan**
6^{7}
**7^{8}**
**7**

- (United States) **J Blake**
- (United States) **D Johnson**
**7^{7}**
**6**

- (United States) J Blake
- (United States) D Johnson
1
2

3
- (United States) **B Bryan**
- (United States) **M Bryan**
**6**
**6**

3
- (United States) B Bryan
- (United States) M Bryan
6^{2}
**6**
4

2
- (India) **M Bhupathi**
- (Belarus) **M Mirnyi**
**7^{7}**
3
**6**

6
- (Zimbabwe) W Black
- (Zimbabwe) K Ullyett
4
4

- (Chile) F González
- (Spain) T Robredo
6^{4}
4

WC
- (Germany) **D Prinosil**
- (Germany) **A Waske**
**6**
**6**

WC
- (Germany) **D Prinosil**
- (Germany) **A Waske**
**7^{7}**
**6**

WC
- (Germany) D Prinosil
- (Germany) A Waske
6^{6}
**6**
3

- (Czech Republic) **T Cibulec**
- (Czech Republic) **P Vízner**
**7^{7}**
**6**

2
- (India) **M Bhupathi**
- (Belarus) **M Mirnyi**
**7^{8}**
3
**6**

WC
- (Germany) M Kohlmann
- (Germany) R Schüttler
6^{4}
3

- (Czech Republic) T Cibulec
- (Czech Republic) P Vízner
4
**6**
6^{2}

2
- (India) **M Bhupathi**
- (Belarus) **M Mirnyi**
**6**
3
**7^{7}**
