= 2003 Abierto Mexicano Telefonica Movistar =

- Date: February 24 – March 2
- Edition: 10th (men) / 3rd (women)
- Surface: Clay / Outdoor
- Location: Acapulco, Mexico

Champions

Men's singles
- (Argentina) Agustín Calleri

Women's singles
- (South Africa) Amanda Coetzer

Men's doubles
- (The Bahamas) Mark Knowles / (Canada) Daniel Nestor

Women's doubles
- (France) Émilie Loit / (Sweden) Åsa Svensson
- Mexican Open

The 2003 Abierto Mexicano Telefonica Movistar was a tennis tournament played on outdoor clay courts at the Fairmont Acapulco Princess in Acapulco in Mexico that was part of the International Series Gold of the 2003 ATP Tour and of Tier III of the 2003 WTA Tour. The tournament was held from February 24 through March 2, 2003.

== Finals ==
=== Men's singles ===
(Argentina) Agustín Calleri defeated (Argentina) Mariano Zabaleta 7–5, 3–6, 6–3

- It was Calleri's 2nd title of the year and the 2nd of his career.

=== Women's singles ===
(South Africa) Amanda Coetzer defeated (Argentina) Mariana Díaz Oliva 7–5, 6–3

- It was Coetzer's only title of the year and the 9th of her career.

=== Men's doubles ===
(The Bahamas) Mark Knowles / (Canada) Daniel Nestor defeated (Spain) David Ferrer / (Spain) Fernando Vicente 6–3, 6–3

- It was Knowles' 2nd title of the year and the 26th of his career. It was Nestor's 2nd title of the year and the 28th of his career.

=== Women's doubles ===
(France) Émilie Loit / (Sweden) Åsa Svensson defeated (Hungary) Petra Mandula / (Austria) Patricia Wartusch 6–3, 6–1

- It was Loit's 2nd title of the year and the 6th of her career. It was Svensson's 2nd title of the year and the 8th of her career.
