= 2003 If Stockholm Open =

- Date: 20–26 October
- Edition: 35th
- Category: International Series
- Draw: 32S / 16D
- Prize money: $625,000
- Surface: Hard / indoor
- Location: Stockholm, Sweden
- Venue: Kungliga tennishallen

Champions

Singles
- (United States) Mardy Fish

Doubles
- (Sweden) Jonas Björkman / (Australia) Todd Woodbridge
← 2002 ·	Stockholm Open	· 2004 →

The 2003 If Stockholm Open was a men's tennis tournament played on indoor hard courts at the Kungliga tennishallen in Stockholm, Sweden and was part of the International Series of the 2002 ATP Tour. The tournament was held from 20 October through 26 October 2003. Fifth-seeded Mardy Fish won the singles title.

== Finals ==
=== Singles ===
(United States) Mardy Fish defeated (Sweden) Robin Söderling 7–5, 3–6, 7–6^{(7–4)}

- It was Fish's first singles title of his career.

=== Doubles ===
(Sweden) Jonas Björkman / (Australia) Todd Woodbridge defeated (Australia) Wayne Arthurs / (Australia) Paul Hanley 6–3, 6–4

- It was Björkman's 4th title of the year and the 38th of his career. It was Woodbridge's 4th title of the year and the 80th of his career.
