= 2003 Stella Artois Championships =

- Date: 9–15 June
- Edition: 101st
- Category: International Series
- Draw: 56S / 24D
- Prize money: $800,000
- Surface: Grass / outdoor
- Location: London, United Kingdom
- Venue: Queen's Club

Champions

Singles
- (United States) Andy Roddick

Doubles
- (The Bahamas) Mark Knowles / (Canada) Daniel Nestor
← 2002 ·	Queen's Club Championships	· 2004 →

The 2003 Stella Artois Championships was a men's tennis tournament played on grass courts at the Queen's Club in London in the United Kingdom. The event was part of the International Series of the 2003 ATP Tour. It was the 101st edition of the tournament and was held from 9 June until 15 June 2003. Third-seeded Andy Roddick won the singles title.

== Finals ==
=== Singles ===
(United States) Andy Roddick defeated (France) Sébastien Grosjean 6–3, 6–3

- It was Roddick's 2nd singles title of the year and the 7th of his career.

=== Doubles ===
(The Bahamas) Mark Knowles / (Canada) Daniel Nestor defeated (India) Mahesh Bhupathi / (Belarus) Max Mirnyi 5–7, 6–4, 7–6^{(7–3)}

- It was Knowles' 5th title of the year and the 29th of his career. It was Nestor's 5th title of the year and the 31st of his career.
