= 2003 Italian Open – Women's doubles =

Women's doubles
- 2003 Italian Open

Final
- Champions: (Russia) Svetlana Kuznetsova (United States) Martina Navratilova
- Runners-up: (Federal Republic of Yugoslavia) Jelena Dokic (Russia) Nadia Petrova
- Score: 6–4, 5–7, 6–2

Events
Singles	men	women
Doubles	men	women
← 2002 ·	Italian Open	· 2004 →

Virginia Ruano Pascual and Paola Suárez were the defending champions, but lost in quarterfinals to Els Callens and Émilie Loit.

Svetlana Kuznetsova and Martina Navratilova won the title, defeating Jelena Dokic and Nadia Petrova 6–4, 5–7, 6–2 in the final. It was the 6th doubles title for Kuznetsova and the 170th doubles title for Navratilova, in their respective careers.

== Seeds ==
The first four seeds received a bye into the second round.

1. (Spain) Virginia Ruano Pascual / (Argentina) Paola Suárez (quarterfinals)
2. (Belgium) ~~Kim Clijsters~~ / (Japan) ~~Ai Sugiyama~~ (withdrew due to a left hamstring strain on Clijsters)
3. (Zimbabwe) Cara Black / (Russia) Elena Likhovtseva (second round)
4. (Federal Republic of Yugoslavia) Jelena Dokic / (Russia) Nadia Petrova (final)
5. (Russia) Svetlana Kuznetsova / (United States) Martina Navratilova (champions)
6. (Spain) ~~Conchita Martínez~~ / (United States) ~~Meghann Shaughnessy~~ (withdrew due to a low back pain on Shaughnessy)
7. (Slovakia) Janette Husárová / (Switzerland) Patty Schnyder (first round)
8. (Switzerland) Emmanuelle Gagliardi / (Hungary) Petra Mandula (quarterfinals)

== Draw ==
=== Key ===
- Q = Qualifier
- WC = Wild card
- LL = Lucky loser
- Alt = Alternate
- ITF = ITF entry
- PR = Protected ranking
- SR = Special ranking
- SE = Special exempt
- JE = Junior exempt
- JR = Junior Accelerator Programme entrant
- CO = College Accelerator Programme entrant
- NG = Next Gen Accelerator Program entrant
- w/o = Walkover
- r = Retired
- d = Defaulted

=== Finals ===
Semifinals
(Belgium) Els Callens (France) Émilie Loit	3	2
5	(Russia) Svetlana Kuznetsova (United States) Martina Navratilova	6	6
4	(Federal Republic of Yugoslavia) Jelena Dokic (Russia) Nadia Petrova	4	6	6
(Slovenia) Tina Križan (Slovenia) Katarina Srebotnik	6	4	2

Final
5	(Russia) Svetlana Kuznetsova (United States) Martina Navratilova	6	5	6
4	(Federal Republic of Yugoslavia) Jelena Dokic (Russia) Nadia Petrova	4	7	2

=== Top half ===
First round
(Slovakia) D Hantuchová (United States) C Rubin	6	6
(Hungary) K Marosi (United States) S Reeves	2	3
(Russia) A Jidkova (United States) A Spears	6	6
(France) C Dhenin (Paraguay) R Neffa-de los Ríos	3	4
(Belgium) E Callens (France) É Loit	2	6	7^{7}
LL	(Spain) MJ Martínez Sánchez (Spain) A Medina Garrigues	6	0	6^{4}
Q	(Russia) A Myskina (Russia) D Safina	2	0
(South Africa) L Huber (Bulgaria) M Maleeva	6	6
(Chinese Taipei) J Lee (Indonesia) W Prakusya	6	7^{7}
(Australia) T Musgrave (Ukraine) T Perebiynis	2	6^{3}
(United States) C Morariu (Ukraine) E Tatarkova	6^{3}	1
5	(Russia) S Kuznetsova (United States) M Navratilova	7^{7}	6

Second round
1	(Spain) V Ruano Pascual (Argentina) P Suárez	7	6
(Slovakia) D Hantuchová (United States) C Rubin	5	0
(Russia) A Jidkova (United States) A Spears	3	5
(Belgium) E Callens (France) É Loit	6	7
3	(Zimbabwe) C Black (Russia) E Likhovtseva	4	4
(South Africa) L Huber (Bulgaria) M Maleeva	6	6
(Chinese Taipei) J Lee (Indonesia) W Prakusya	5	4
5	(Russia) S Kuznetsova (United States) M Navratilova	7	6

Quarterfinals
1	(Spain) V Ruano Pascual (Argentina) P Suárez	5	0
(Belgium) E Callens (France) É Loit	7	6
(South Africa) L Huber (Bulgaria) M Maleeva	6^{6}	1
5	(Russia) S Kuznetsova (United States) M Navratilova	7^{8}	6

Semifinals
(Belgium) E Callens (France) É Loit	3	2
5	(Russia) S Kuznetsova (United States) M Navratilova	6	6

=== Bottom half ===
First round
8	(Switzerland) E Gagliardi (Hungary) P Mandula	6	6
(Venezuela) M Vento-Kabchi (Indonesia) A Widjaja	4	4
(United States) J Hopkins (Canada) S Jeyaseelan	w/o
WC	(Italy) R Grande (United States) M Seles
(Italy) S Farina Elia (Italy) T Garbin	6	6
WC	(Italy) Ad Serra Zanetti (Italy) An Serra Zanetti	1	4
7	(Slovakia) J Husárová (Switzerland) P Schnyder	3	0
(Argentina) P Tarabini (Netherlands) C Vis	6	6
(France) M Bartoli (Slovenia) M Matevžič	4	6	6
(Austria) B Schett (Austria) P Wartusch	6	2	4
WC	(Italy) F Pennetta (Italy) R Vinci	1	4
(Slovenia) T Križan (Slovenia) K Srebotnik	6	6

Second round
8	(Switzerland) E Gagliardi (Hungary) P Mandula	6	6
(United States) J Hopkins (Canada) S Jeyaseelan	4	2
(Italy) S Farina Elia (Italy) T Garbin	3	4
4	(Federal Republic of Yugoslavia) J Dokic (Russia) N Petrova	6	6
(Argentina) P Tarabini (Netherlands) C Vis	5	6^{5}
(France) M Bartoli (Slovenia) M Matevžič	7	7^{7}
(Slovenia) T Križan (Slovenia) K Srebotnik	6	6
LL	(Australia) E Dominikovic (Romania) A Vanc	2	1

Quarterfinals
8	(Switzerland) E Gagliardi (Hungary) P Mandula	7	4	3
4	(Federal Republic of Yugoslavia) J Dokic (Russia) N Petrova	5	6	6
(France) M Bartoli (Slovenia) M Matevžič	7^{7}	2	2
(Slovenia) T Križan (Slovenia) K Srebotnik	6^{1}	6	6

Semifinals
4	(Federal Republic of Yugoslavia) J Dokic (Russia) N Petrova	4	6	6
(Slovenia) T Križan (Slovenia) K Srebotnik	6	4	2
