= 2003 Western & Southern Financial Group Masters =

- Date: August 11–17
- Edition: 102nd
- Surface: Hard / outdoor
- Location: Mason, United States
- Venue: Lindner Family Tennis Center

Champions

Singles
- (United States) Andy Roddick

Doubles
- (United States) Bob Bryan / (United States) Mike Bryan
- Cincinnati Masters

The 2003 Western & Southern Financial Group Masters was a tennis tournament played on outdoor hard courts. It was the 102nd edition of the Cincinnati Masters and was part of the Tennis Masters Series of the 2003 ATP Tour. It took place at the Lindner Family Tennis Center in Mason, Ohio in the United States from August 11 through August 17, 2003.

The tournament had previously appeared as part of Tier III of the WTA Tour but no event was held from 1989 to 2003. The women's tournament returned to the schedule in 2004.

== Finals ==
=== Singles ===
(United States) Andy Roddick defeated (United States) Mardy Fish 4–6, 7–6^{(7–3)}, 7–6^{(7–4)}

- It was Roddick's 5th title of the year and the 12th of his career. It was his 2nd Masters title of the year and his 2nd overall.

=== Doubles ===
(United States) Bob Bryan / (United States) Mike Bryan defeated (Australia) Wayne Arthurs / (Australia) Paul Hanley 7–5, 7–6^{(7–5)}

- It was Bob Bryan's 4th title of the year and the 13th of his career. It was Mike Bryan's 4th title of the year and the 15th of his career.
