= 2003 Mutua Madrileña Masters Madrid =

- Date: 13–19 October
- Edition: 2nd
- Surface: Hard / indoor
- Location: Madrid, Spain
- Venue: Madrid Arena

Champions

Singles
- (Spain) Juan Carlos Ferrero

Doubles
- (India) Mahesh Bhupathi / (Belarus) Max Mirnyi
- Madrid Open

The 2003 Mutua Madrileña Masters Madrid was a tennis tournament played on indoor hard courts. It was the 2nd edition of the Madrid Masters and was part of the Tennis Masters Series of the 2003 ATP Tour. It took place at the Madrid Arena in Madrid in Spain from 13 October through 19 October 2003. First-seeded Juan Carlos Ferrero won the singles title.

== Finals ==
=== Singles ===
(Spain) Juan Carlos Ferrero defeated (Chile) Nicolás Massú 6–3, 6–4, 6–3

- It was Ferrero's 4th title of the year and the 11th of his career. It was his 2nd Masters Series title of the year and his 4th overall.

=== Doubles ===
(India) Mahesh Bhupathi / (Belarus) Max Mirnyi defeated (Zimbabwe) Wayne Black / (Zimbabwe) Kevin Ullyett 6–2, 2–6, 6–3

- It was Bhupathi's 5th title of the year and the 31st of his career. It was Mirnyi's 7th title of the year and the 20th of his career.
