= 2003 Pacific Life Open =

- Date: March 5–16
- Edition: 30th
- Category: Tennis Masters Series (ATP); Tier I Series (WTA)
- Prize money: $2,200,000
- Surface: Hard / outdoor
- Location: Indian Wells, CA, US
- Venue: Indian Wells Tennis Garden

Champions

Men's singles
- (Australia) Lleyton Hewitt

Women's singles
- (Belgium) Kim Clijsters

Men's doubles
- (South Africa) Wayne Ferreira / (Russia) Yevgeny Kafelnikov

Women's doubles
- (United States) Lindsay Davenport / (United States) Lisa Raymond
- Indian Wells Open

The 2003 Pacific Life Open was a tennis tournament played on outdoor hard courts. It was the 30th edition of the Indian Wells Open and was part of the Tennis Masters Series of the 2003 ATP Tour and of Tier I of the 2003 WTA Tour. Both the men's and women's events took place at the Indian Wells Tennis Garden in Indian Wells, California in the United States from March 5 through March 16, 2003.

== Finals ==
=== Men's singles ===
(Australia) Lleyton Hewitt defeated (Brazil) Gustavo Kuerten, 6–1, 6–1

- It was Hewitt's 2nd title of the year and the 21st of his career. It was his 1st Masters title of the year and his 2nd overall. It was also his 2nd title at the event after winning in 2002.

=== Women's singles ===
(Belgium) Kim Clijsters defeated (United States) Lindsay Davenport 6–4, 7–5

- It was Clijsters' 4th title of the year and the 19th of her career. It was her 1st Tier I title.

=== Men's doubles ===
(South Africa) Wayne Ferreira / (Russia) Yevgeny Kafelnikov defeated (United States) Bob Bryan / (United States) Mike Bryan 3–6, 7–5, 6–4

- It was Ferreira's 1st title of the year and the 25th of his career. It was Kafelnikov's 1st title of the year and the 52nd of his career.

=== Women's doubles ===
(United States) Lindsay Davenport / (United States) Lisa Raymond defeated (Belgium) Kim Clijsters / (Japan) Ai Sugiyama 3–6, 6–4, 6–1

- It was Davenport's 2nd title of the year and the 72nd of her career. It was Raymond's 2nd title of the year and the 43rd of her career.
