= 2003 Italian Open (tennis) =

- Date: 5–11 May (men); 12–18 May (women)
- Edition: 60th
- Surface: Clay / outdoor
- Location: Rome, Italy
- Venue: Foro Italico

Champions

Men's singles
- (Spain) Félix Mantilla

Women's singles
- (Belgium) Kim Clijsters

Men's doubles
- (Australia) Wayne Arthurs / (Australia) Paul Hanley

Women's doubles
- (Russia) Svetlana Kuznetsova / (United States) Martina Navratilova
← 2002 ·	Italian Open	· 2004 →

The 2003 Italian Open (also known as 2003 Rome Masters or its sponsored title 2003 Telecom Italia Masters) was a tennis tournament played on outdoor clay courts. It was the 60th edition of the Italian Open and was part of the Tennis Masters Series of the 2003 ATP Tour and of Tier I of the 2003 WTA Tour. Both the men's and women's events took place at the Foro Italico in Rome in Italy. The men's tournament was played from 5 May through 11 May 2003 while the women's tournament was played from May 12 through May 18, 2003.

== Finals ==
=== Men's singles ===
(Spain) Félix Mantilla defeated (Switzerland) Roger Federer 7–5, 6–2, 7–6^{(10–8)}

- It was Mantilla's only title of the year and the 10th of his career. It was also his first and last Masters title.

=== Women's singles ===
(Belgium) Kim Clijsters defeated (France) Amélie Mauresmo 3–6, 7–6^{(7–3)}, 6–0

- It was Clijsters' 5th title of the year and the 20th of her career. It was her 2nd Tier I title of the year and her 2nd overall.

=== Men's doubles ===
(Australia) Wayne Arthurs / (Australia) Paul Hanley defeated (France) Michaël Llodra / (France) Fabrice Santoro 6–1, 6–3

- It was Arthurs' 2nd title of the year and the 8th of his career. It was Hanley's 3rd title of the year and the 4th of his career.

=== Women's doubles ===
(Russia) Svetlana Kuznetsova / (United States) Martina Navratilova defeated (Serbia and Montenegro) Jelena Dokić / (Russia) Nadia Petrova 6–4, 5–7, 6–2

- It was Kuznetsova's 3rd title of the year and the 8th of her career. It was Navrátilová's 4th title of the year and the 345th of her career.
