= 2003 Roger Federer tennis season =

Statistics for Swiss tennis player

- Calendar prize money: $4,000,680

Singles
- Season record: 78–17 (82.10%)
- Calendar titles: 7
- Year-end ranking: No. 2
- Ranking change from previous year: ▲4

Grand Slam & significant results
- Australian Open: 4R
- French Open: 1R
- Wimbledon: W
- US Open: 4R
- Other tournaments
- Tour Finals: W

Davis Cup
- Davis Cup: SF

Roger Federer won his first Major title at Wimbledon, when he defeated Mark Philippoussis in the final, 7–6^{(7–5)}, 6–2, 7–6^{(7–3)}. Federer won his first and only doubles Masters Series 1000 Event in Miami with Max Mirnyi, and made it to one singles Masters Series 1000 final in Rome on clay, which he lost. Federer made it to nine finals on the ATP Tour, of which he won seven, including the 500 series events at Dubai and Vienna. Lastly, Federer won the Year-End Championships over Andre Agassi.

== Year summary ==
=== Early hard court season ===
Federer began the 2003 season as the world number 6, with the stated goal of capturing his first career Grand Slam title. However, early loses in Doha to Jan-Michael Gambill and as defending champion in Sydney to Franco Squillari kicked off the year in an ominous fashion.

In the first Grand Slam tournament of the year, Federer entered as the sixth seed and had a good chance to win his first Grand Slam when his draw opened up with the quick elimination of major rivals Marat Safin and Lleyton Hewitt. Federer entered the round of 16 without having dropped a set and faced his early nemesis David Nalbandian of Argentina. The match was a back-and-forth struggle, however, Federer ended up losing the five set match 4–6, 6–3, 1–6, 6–1, 3–6.

He then won two hard-court tournaments in Marseille and Dubai, defeating Jonas Björkman and Jiří Novák respectively. These two tournament victories constituted his fifth and sixth career singles titles. Back in the United States Federer had disappointing results at the Masters Series tournaments in Indian Wells and Key Biscayne. He was upset in early-round matches by a pair of former French Open champions, Gustavo Kuerten and Albert Costa.

=== Clay court season ===
On clay, Federer won the tournament in Munich defeating Finn Jarkko Nieminen 6–1, 6–4. This was his seventh career title and second career clay court title. Following this victory, Federer began his preparation for the French Open by competing in the clay masters tournaments in Rome and Hamburg. He reached the finals of Rome dropping only a single set, but was upset in a shocking defeat to the unseeded Spaniard Félix Mantilla 5–7, 2–6, 6–7(8). In Hamburg, the final tuneup before the French Open, Federer was defeated in the third round by Australian Mark Philippoussis 3–6, 6–2, 3–6.

His victory in Munich and finals showing in Rome launched Federer into the conversation as a favorite to win the French. Federer, seeded number five, was determined to prove himself at the French Open in 2003 after losing in the first round the year before. His opponent in the first round was Luis Horna of Peru who ranked number 88 in the world. Federer started out well, jumping out to a 5–3 lead in the first set before imploding and losing the match 6–7(6), 2–6, 6–7(3). After the nightmarish match where Federer committed an astounding 82 unforced errors he stated, "I don't know how long I'll need to get over this defeat. A day, a week, a year—or my entire career."

=== Grass court season ===
Two weeks after his crushing defeat in the first round of the French Open, Federer began the grass court season. He competed in the Gerry Weber Open in Halle, Germany. Federer quickly wiped away the bitter defeat in France by reaching the finals and defeating German Nicolas Kiefer 6–1, 6–3. This was Federer's first title on grass and it propelled him to odds of 5:1 to win Wimbledon at the British betting offices—behind only Americans Andre Agassi and Andy Roddick.

Federer entered Wimbledon as the fourth seed and quickly raced through the first three rounds. In the fourth round he faced Feliciano López and was victorious in straight sets even though he had to take numerous injury timeouts for a serious lower back injury sustained in the match warm-up. In the quarterfinals Federer was fortunate that the match was delayed because of rain and was able to rest his injury for two whole days. When the quarterfinals finally began Federer defeated the eighth seed Sjeng Schalken of the Netherlands. His next match was a blockbuster semifinal where he faced American favorite Andy Roddick. Roddick had won the other grass court tuneup at the Queen's Club Championships and was an extremely dangerous opponent on grass. Federer defeated his young American rival 7–6(6), 6–3, 6–3 and became the first Swiss man to advance to the finals of a Grand Slam tournament. In the finals Federer faced Australian Philippoussis who had defeated him earlier in the year at Hamburg. Federer, however, proved that he possessed the quality of a champion and rose to the occasion. As Philippoussis' backhand sailed into the net on championship point Federer sank to his knees, raised his arms above his head, and looked to the sky. He had defeated the Australian 7–6(5), 6–2, 7–6(3) and finally achieved his elusive first Grand Slam title.

His breakthrough and victory and the 2003 Wimbledon Championships proved especially significant because Federer would go on to win more Grand Slam and Wimbledon titles than any man in tennis history. This achievement of winning his first ever Wimbledon and Grand Slam title has been repeatedly described by the Swiss star as the highlight of his career along with his 2009 victory at Roland Garros.

=== Gstaad ===
Immediately following his historic Wimbledon victory, Federer flew to the Bernese Alps to honor his commitment of playing the Swiss Open in Gstaad. This tournament was unique in Federer's calendar as it was played on a clay surface in between the grass and summer hard court seasons. Federer's Wimbledon victory was honored by the tournament which gave the Swiss star a 1,760 pound milking cow named Juliette. Federer continued his winning ways until exhaustion finally caught up to him in the finals, where he fell to Jiří Novák in five sets ending his 15 match winning streak. This loss, however, could not lessen the euphoric atmosphere in Switzerland in the wake of his Wimbledon performance.

=== Summer hard court season ===
During the North American summer hard-court season, however, Federer lost his initial opportunities to ascend to the top of the world rankings. Federer lost an extremely close match in the semifinals of the Masters Series tournament in Montreal to Roddick which ended in a final-set tiebreaker 4–6, 6–3, 6–7(3). This would be the last time he would lose to Roddick until 2008. At the Cincinnati Masters Federer lost to rival David Nalbandian in the second round. This loss to Nalbandian was extremely close as well with Federer on the unlucky end of a 6–7(4), 6–7(5) result.

Federer entered the 2003 US Open for the first time ever as a Grand Slam champion. The number two seed breezed through the first three rounds of the tournament dropping only his opening set. In the fourth round Federer again faced nemesis Nalbandian who had defeated him in the previous tournament and held a 4–0 head-to-head record against the Swiss. The Argentine again frustrated Federer as the Swiss lost 6–3, 6–7, 4–6, 3–6. His goal of achieving the number one ranking receded even further as Roddick completed the American summer hard court triple.

=== Fall indoor season ===
During the autumn, Federer played four consecutive indoor tournaments in Europe. He won the tournament in Vienna defeating former world number one and French Open champion Carlos Moyá 6–3, 6–3, 6–3. However, he failed to reach the finals in his home tournament of Basel and the Masters Series tournaments in Madrid and Paris.

To end the year, Federer won his first Tennis Masters Cup title in Houston. As the third-seeded player, he defeated Andre Agassi to open the round robin in a thrilling 6–7(2), 6–3, 7–6(7) epic. He would go on to win in straight sets against Nalbandian, 6–3, 6–0, defeating the Argentine for the first time in his career. His last round robin match was against world number 2 Juan Carlos Ferrero who fell to Federer 6–3, 6–1. In the semifinals he defeated world number 1 and US Open champion Andy Roddick 7–6, 6–2. Federer entered the final against the 1990 champion Andre Agassi and won decisively 6–3, 6–0, 6–4.

Federer challenged for the top ranking during 2003, finishing the year at world number 2, just behind Roddick and just ahead of Juan Carlos Ferrero.

== Matches ==
=== Grand Slam performance ===
Tournament	Round	Result	Opponent	Score
Australian Open	1R	Win	(Brazil) Flávio Saretta	7–6^{(7–4)}, 7–5, 6–3
Australian Open	2R	Win	(Germany) Lars Burgsmüller	6–3, 6–0, 6–3
Australian Open	3R	Win	(Sweden) Andreas Vinciguerra	6–3, 6–4, 6–2
Australian Open	4R	Loss	(Argentina) David Nalbandian	4–6, 6–3, 1–6, 6–1, 3–6
French Open	1R	Loss	(Peru) Luis Horna	6–7^{(6–8)}, 2–6, 6–7^{(3–7)}
Wimbledon	1R	Win	(South Korea) Hyung-Taik Lee	6–3, 6–3, 7–6^{(7–2)}
Wimbledon	2R	Win	(Austria) Stefan Koubek	7–5, 6–1, 6–1
Wimbledon	3R	Win	(United States) Mardy Fish	6–3, 6–1, 4–6, 6–1
Wimbledon	4R	Win	(Spain) Feliciano López	7–6^{(7–5)}, 6–4, 6–4
Wimbledon	QF	Win	(Netherlands) Sjeng Schalken	6–3, 6–4, 6–4
Wimbledon	SF	Win	(United States) Andy Roddick	7–6^{(8–6)}, 6–3, 6–3
Wimbledon	F	Win (1)	(Australia) Mark Philippoussis	7–6^{(7–5)}, 6–2, 7–6^{(7–3)}
US Open	1R	Win	(Argentina) José Acasuso	5–7, 6–3, 6–3, 2–0 ret.
US Open	2R	Win	(Monaco) Jean-René Lisnard	6–1, 6–2, 6–0
US Open	3R	Win	(United States) James Blake	6–3, 7–6^{(7–4)}, 6–3
US Open	4R	Loss	(Argentina) David Nalbandian	6–3, 6–7^{(1–7)}, 4–6, 3–6

=== All matches ===
==== Singles ====
Match	Tournament	Country	Start; Date	Entry	Type	I/O	Surface	Round	Opponent	Result	Score
252	Doha	Qatar	12/30/2002	DA	250	Outdoor	Hard	R32	(Russia) Andrei Stoliarov	W	6–2, 6–7^{(4–7)}, 6–4
253	Doha	Qatar	12/30/2002	DA	250	Outdoor	Hard	R16	(Switzerland) Michel Kratochvil	W	6–4, 6–4
254	Doha	Qatar	12/30/2002	DA	250	Outdoor	Hard	Q	(United States) Jan-Michael Gambill	L	4–6, 5–7
255	Sydney	Australia	1/6/2003	DA	250	Outdoor	Hard	R32	(Argentina) Franco Squillari	L	2–6, 3–6
256	Australian Open	Australia	1/13/2003	DA	GS	Outdoor	Hard	R128	(Brazil) Flávio Saretta	W	7–6^{(7–4)}, 7–5, 6–3
257	Australian Open	Australia	1/13/2003	DA	GS	Outdoor	Hard	R64	(Germany) Lars Burgsmüller	W	6–3, 6–0, 6–3
258	Australian Open	Australia	1/13/2003	DA	GS	Outdoor	Hard	R32	(Sweden) Andreas Vinciguerra	W	6–3, 6–4, 6–2
259	Australian Open	Australia	1/13/2003	DA	GS	Outdoor	Hard	R16	(Argentina) David Nalbandian	L	4–6, 6–3, 1–6, 6–1, 3–6
260	NED v. SUI WG Rd 1	Netherlands	2/7/2003	DA	DC	Indoor	Carpet	RR	(Netherlands) Raemon Sluiter	W	6–2, 6–1, 6–3
261	NED v. SUI WG Rd 1	Netherlands	2/7/2003	DA	DC	Indoor	Carpet	RR	(Netherlands) Sjeng Schalken	W	7–6^{(7–2)}, 6–4, 7–5
262	Marseille	France	2/10/2003	DA	250	Indoor	Hard	R32	(Croatia) Ivan Ljubičić	W	7–6^{(7–3)} RET
263	Marseille	France	2/10/2003	DA	250	Indoor	Hard	R16	(Finland) Jarkko Nieminen	W	6–3, 6–3
264	Marseille	France	2/10/2003	DA	250	Indoor	Hard	Q	(Netherlands) Raemon Sluiter	W	6–4, 4–6, 6–4
265	Marseille	France	2/10/2003	DA	250	Indoor	Hard	S	(Slovakia) Karol Kučera	W	7–6^{(7–5)}, 6–3
266	Marseille	France	2/10/2003	DA	250	Indoor	Hard	Win (1)	(Sweden) Jonas Björkman	W	6–2, 7–6^{(8–6)}
267	Rotterdam	Netherlands	2/17/2003	DA	500	Indoor	Hard	R32	(Sweden) Thomas Enqvist	W	3–6, 6–3, 6–4
268	Rotterdam	Netherlands	2/17/2003	DA	500	Indoor	Hard	R16	(France) Fabrice Santoro	W	6–0, 6–4
269	Rotterdam	Netherlands	2/17/2003	DA	500	Indoor	Hard	Q	(Netherlands) Sjeng Schalken	W	6–2, 6–4
270	Rotterdam	Netherlands	2/17/2003	DA	500	Indoor	Hard	S	(Belarus) Max Mirnyi	L	7–5, 3–6, 4–6
271	Dubai	U.A.E.	2/24/2003	DA	500	Outdoor	Hard	R32	(Georgia (country)) Irakli Labadze	W	6–3, 6–3
272	Dubai	U.A.E.	2/24/2003	DA	500	Outdoor	Hard	R16	(Germany) Maximilian Abel	W	6–4, 7–5
273	Dubai	U.A.E.	2/24/2003	DA	500	Outdoor	Hard	Q	(Morocco) Hicham Arazi	W	7–5, 6–3
274	Dubai	U.A.E.	2/24/2003	DA	500	Outdoor	Hard	S	(Croatia) Ivan Ljubičić	W	6–3, 6–2
275	Dubai	U.A.E.	2/24/2003	DA	500	Outdoor	Hard	Win (2)	(Czech Republic) Jiří Novák	W	6–1, 7–6^{(7–2)}
276	ATP Masters Series Indian Wells	USA	3/10/2003	DA	1000	Outdoor	Hard	R64	(Spain) Félix Mantilla	W	6–7^{(4–7)}, 6–4, 4–1 RET
277	ATP Masters Series Indian Wells	USA	3/10/2003	DA	1000	Outdoor	Hard	R32	(Brazil) Gustavo Kuerten	L	5–7, 6–7^{(3–7)}
-	ATP Masters Series Miami	USA	3/17/2003	DA	1000	Outdoor	Hard	R128	Bye	-	
278	ATP Masters Series Miami	USA	3/17/2003	DA	1000	Outdoor	Hard	R64	(Peru) Luis Horna	W	6–2, 7–5
279	ATP Masters Series Miami	USA	3/17/2003	DA	1000	Outdoor	Hard	R32	(Argentina) Juan Ignacio Chela	W	6–1, 3–6, 6–1
280	ATP Masters Series Miami	USA	3/17/2003	DA	1000	Outdoor	Hard	R16	(Netherlands) Sjeng Schalken	W	6–3, 6–2
281	ATP Masters Series Miami	USA	3/17/2003	DA	1000	Outdoor	Hard	Q	(Spain) Albert Costa	L	6–7^{(4–7)}, 6–4, 6–7^{(7–9)}
282	FRA v. SUI WG Qtrs	France	4/4/2003	DA	DC	Indoor	Hard	RR	(France) Nicolas Escudé	W	6–4, 7–5, 6–2
283	FRA v. SUI WG Qtrs	France	4/4/2003	DA	DC	Indoor	Hard	RR	(France) Fabrice Santoro	W	6–1, 6–0, 6–2
284	Munich	Germany	4/28/2003	DA	250	Outdoor	Clay	R32	(Croatia) Željko Krajan	W	6–4, 6–3
285	Munich	Germany	4/28/2003	DA	250	Outdoor	Clay	R16	(Netherlands) Raemon Sluiter	W	6–4, 6–3
286	Munich	Germany	4/28/2003	DA	250	Outdoor	Clay	Q	(Russia) Mikhail Youzhny	W	6–2, 6–3
287	Munich	Germany	4/28/2003	DA	250	Outdoor	Clay	S	(Austria) Stefan Koubek	W	6–2, 6–1
288	Munich	Germany	4/28/2003	DA	250	Outdoor	Clay	Win (3)	(Finland) Jarkko Nieminen	W	6–1, 6–4
289	ATP Masters Series Rome	Italy	5/5/2003	DA	1000	Outdoor	Clay	R64	(France) Paul-Henri Mathieu	W	6–3, 7–5
290	ATP Masters Series Rome	Italy	5/5/2003	DA	1000	Outdoor	Clay	R32	(Argentina) Mariano Zabaleta	W	7–6^{(7–4)}, 6–2
291	ATP Masters Series Rome	Italy	5/5/2003	DA	1000	Outdoor	Clay	R16	(Spain) Tommy Robredo	W	6–1, 6–1
292	ATP Masters Series Rome	Italy	5/5/2003	DA	1000	Outdoor	Clay	Q	(Italy) Filippo Volandri	W	6–3, 5–7, 6–2
293	ATP Masters Series Rome	Italy	5/5/2003	DA	1000	Outdoor	Clay	S	(Spain) Juan Carlos Ferrero	W	6–4, 4–2 RET
294	ATP Masters Series Rome	Italy	5/5/2003	DA	1000	Outdoor	Clay	F	(Spain) Félix Mantilla	L	5–7, 2–6, 6–7^{(8–10)}
295	ATP Masters Series Hamburg	Germany	5/12/2003	DA	1000	Outdoor	Clay	R64	(Belarus) Max Mirnyi	W	6–3, 6–3
296	ATP Masters Series Hamburg	Germany	5/12/2003	DA	1000	Outdoor	Clay	R32	(Armenia) Sargis Sargsian	W	6–1, 6–1
297	ATP Masters Series Hamburg	Germany	5/12/2003	DA	1000	Outdoor	Clay	R16	(Australia) Mark Philippoussis	L	3–6, 6–2, 3–6
298	Roland Garros	France	5/26/2003	DA	GS	Outdoor	Clay	R128	(Peru) Luis Horna	L	6–7^{(6–8)}, 2–6, 6–7^{(3–7)}
299	Halle	Germany	6/9/2003	DA	250	Outdoor	Grass	R32	(Armenia) Sargis Sargsian	W	7–5, 6–1
300	Halle	Germany	6/9/2003	DA	250	Outdoor	Grass	R16	(Spain) Fernando Vicente	W	4–6, 6–2, 6–1
301	Halle	Germany	6/9/2003	DA	250	Outdoor	Grass	Q	(Morocco) Younes El Aynaoui	W	7–5, 7–6^{(7–3)}
302	Halle	Germany	6/9/2003	DA	250	Outdoor	Grass	S	(Russia) Mikhail Youzhny	W	4–6, 7–6^{(7–4)}, 6–2
303	Halle	Germany	6/9/2003	DA	250	Outdoor	Grass	Win (4)	(Germany) Nicolas Kiefer	W	6–1, 6–3
304	Wimbledon	England	6/23/2003	DA	GS	Outdoor	Grass	R128	(South Korea) Lee Hyung-taik	W	6–3, 6–3, 7–6^{(7–2)}
305	Wimbledon	England	6/23/2003	DA	GS	Outdoor	Grass	R64	(Austria) Stefan Koubek	W	7–5, 6–1, 6–1
306	Wimbledon	England	6/23/2003	DA	GS	Outdoor	Grass	R32	(United States) Mardy Fish	W	6–3, 6–1, 4–6, 6–1
307	Wimbledon	England	6/23/2003	DA	GS	Outdoor	Grass	R16	(Spain) Feliciano López	W	7–6^{(7–5)}, 6–4, 6–4
308	Wimbledon	England	6/23/2003	DA	GS	Outdoor	Grass	Q	(Netherlands) Sjeng Schalken	W	6–3, 6–4, 6–4
309	Wimbledon	England	6/23/2003	DA	GS	Outdoor	Grass	S	(United States) Andy Roddick	W	7–6^{(8–6)}, 6–3, 6–3
310	Wimbledon	England	6/23/2003	DA	GS	Outdoor	Grass	Win (5)	(Australia) Mark Philippoussis	W	7–6^{(7–5)}, 6–2, 7–6^{(7–3)}
311	Gstaad	Switzerland	7/7/2003	DA	250	Outdoor	Clay	R32	(Spain) Marc López	W	6–3, 6–7^{(4–7)}, 6–3
312	Gstaad	Switzerland	7/7/2003	DA	250	Outdoor	Clay	R16	(Monaco) Jean-René Lisnard	W	6–1, 6–2
-	Gstaad	Switzerland	7/7/2003	DA	250	Outdoor	Clay	Q	(Spain) David Sánchez	W/O	N/A
313	Gstaad	Switzerland	7/7/2003	DA	250	Outdoor	Clay	S	(Argentina) Gastón Gaudio	W	6–1, 7–6^{(8–6)}
314	Gstaad	Switzerland	7/7/2003	DA	250	Outdoor	Clay	F	(Czech Republic) Jiří Novák	L	7–5, 3–6, 3–6, 6–1, 3–6
315	ATP Masters Series Canada	Canada	8/4/2003	DA	1000	Outdoor	Hard	R64	(Argentina) Gastón Gaudio	W	6–4, 3–6, 7–5
316	ATP Masters Series Canada	Canada	8/4/2003	DA	1000	Outdoor	Hard	R32	(United Kingdom) Greg Rusedski	W	6–4, 6–3
317	ATP Masters Series Canada	Canada	8/4/2003	DA	1000	Outdoor	Hard	R16	(Spain) Tommy Robredo	W	6–4, 6–3
318	ATP Masters Series Canada	Canada	8/4/2003	DA	1000	Outdoor	Hard	Q	(Belarus) Max Mirnyi	W	6–2, 7–6^{(7–3)}
319	ATP Masters Series Canada	Canada	8/4/2003	DA	1000	Outdoor	Hard	S	(United States) Andy Roddick	L	4–6, 6–3, 6–7^{(3–7)}
320	ATP Masters Series Cincinnati	USA	8/11/2003	DA	1000	Outdoor	Hard	R64	(Australia) Scott Draper	W	4–6, 6–3, 7–6^{(12–10)}
321	ATP Masters Series Cincinnati	USA	8/11/2003	DA	1000	Outdoor	Hard	R32	(Argentina) David Nalbandian	L	6–7^{(4–7)}, 6–7^{(5–7)}
322	US Open	USA	8/25/2003	DA	GS	Outdoor	Hard	R128	(Argentina) José Acasuso	W	5–7, 6–3, 6–3, 2–0 RET
323	US Open	USA	8/25/2003	DA	GS	Outdoor	Hard	R64	(Monaco) Jean-René Lisnard	W	6–1, 6–2, 6–0
324	US Open	USA	8/25/2003	DA	GS	Outdoor	Hard	R32	(United States) James Blake	W	6–3, 7–6^{(7–4)}, 6–3
325	US Open	USA	8/25/2003	DA	GS	Outdoor	Hard	R16	(Argentina) David Nalbandian	L	6–3, 6–7^{(1–7)}, 4–6, 3–6
326	AUS v. SUI WG SF	Australia	9/19/2003	DA	DC	Outdoor	Hard	RR	(Australia) Mark Philippoussis	W	6–3, 6–4, 7–6^{(7–3)}
327	AUS v. SUI WG SF	Australia	9/19/2003	DA	DC	Outdoor	Hard	RR	(Australia) Lleyton Hewitt	L	7–5, 6–2, 6–7^{(4–7)}, 5–7, 1–6
328	Vienna	Austria	10/6/2003	DA	500	Indoor	Hard	R32	(Spain) David Ferrer	W	6–2, 6–2
329	Vienna	Austria	10/6/2003	DA	500	Indoor	Hard	R16	(Slovakia) Karol Beck	W	6–3, 4–6, 6–4
330	Vienna	Austria	10/6/2003	DA	500	Indoor	Hard	Q	(Finland) Jarkko Nieminen	W	6–3, 6–3
331	Vienna	Austria	10/6/2003	DA	500	Indoor	Hard	S	(Belarus) Max Mirnyi	W	6–2, 7–6^{(7–2)}
332	Vienna	Austria	10/6/2003	DA	500	Indoor	Hard	Win (6)	(Spain) Carlos Moyá	W	6–3, 6–3, 6–3
-	ATP Masters Series Madrid	Spain	10/13/2003	DA	1000	Indoor	Hard	R64	Bye	-	
333	ATP Masters Series Madrid	Spain	10/13/2003	DA	1000	Indoor	Hard	R32	(Spain) Àlex Corretja	W	6–4, 6–3
334	ATP Masters Series Madrid	Spain	10/13/2003	DA	1000	Indoor	Hard	R16	(United States) Mardy Fish	W	6–3, 7–6^{(7–4)}
335	ATP Masters Series Madrid	Spain	10/13/2003	DA	1000	Indoor	Hard	Q	(Spain) Feliciano López	W	4–6, 7–6^{(7–3)}, 6–4
336	ATP Masters Series Madrid	Spain	10/13/2003	DA	1000	Indoor	Hard	S	(Spain) Juan Carlos Ferrero	L	4–6, 6–4, 4–6
337	Basel	Switzerland	10/20/2003	DA	250	Indoor	Carpet	R32	(Switzerland) Marc Rosset	W	6–1, 6–3
338	Basel	Switzerland	10/20/2003	DA	250	Indoor	Carpet	R16	(Croatia) Ivan Ljubičić	L	6–7^{(5–7)}, 7–6^{(7–5)}, 4–6
-	ATP Masters Series Paris	France	10/27/2003	DA	1000	Indoor	Carpet	R64	Bye	-	
339	ATP Masters Series Paris	France	10/27/2003	DA	1000	Indoor	Carpet	R32	(France) Thierry Ascione	W	7–6^{(7–5)}, 6–1
340	ATP Masters Series Paris	France	10/27/2003	DA	1000	Indoor	Carpet	R16	(Netherlands) Martin Verkerk	W	6–7^{(3–7)}, 7–6(12), 7–6^{(8–6)}
341	ATP Masters Series Paris	France	10/27/2003	DA	1000	Indoor	Carpet	Q	(United Kingdom) Tim Henman	L	6–7^{(5–7)}, 1–6
342	Tennis Masters Cup	USA	11/10/2003	DA	WC	Outdoor	Hard	RR	(United States) Andre Agassi	W	6–7^{(3–7)}, 6–3, 7–6^{(9–7)}
343	Tennis Masters Cup	USA	11/10/2003	DA	WC	Outdoor	Hard	RR	(Argentina) David Nalbandian	W	6–3, 6–0
344	Tennis Masters Cup	USA	11/10/2003	DA	WC	Outdoor	Hard	RR	(Spain) Juan Carlos Ferrero	W	6–3, 6–1
345	Tennis Masters Cup	USA	11/10/2003	DA	WC	Outdoor	Hard	S	(United States) Andy Roddick	W	7–6^{(7–2)}, 6–2
346	Tennis Masters Cup	USA	11/10/2003	DA	WC	Outdoor	Hard	Win (7)	(United States) Andre Agassi	W	6–3, 6–0, 6–4

== Yearly records ==
=== Finals ===
==== Singles: 9 (7–2) ====
Legend Grand Slam (1–0) ATP World Tour Finals (1–0) ATP World Tour Masters 1000 (0–1) ATP World Tour 500 Series (2–0) ATP World Tour 250 Series (3–1)	Titles by surface Hard (4–0) Clay (1–2) Grass (2–0)	Titles by surface Outdoors (5–2) Indoors (2–0)

Outcome	No.	Date	Tournament	Surface	Opponent	Score
Winner	5.	16 February 2003	Marseille, France	Hard (i)	(Sweden) Jonas Björkman	6–2, 7–6^{(8–6)}
Winner	6.	2 March 2003	Dubai, United Arab Emirates	Hard	(Czech Republic) Jiří Novák	6–1, 7–6^{(7–2)}
Winner	7.	4 May 2003	Munich, Germany	Clay	(Finland) Jarkko Nieminen	6–1, 6–4
Runner-up	7.	11 May 2003	Rome, Italy	Clay	(Spain) Félix Mantilla	5–7, 2–6, 6–7^{(8–10)}
Winner	8.	15 June 2003	Halle, Germany	Grass	(Germany) Nicolas Kiefer	6–1, 6–3
Winner	9.	6 July 2003	Wimbledon, London, England, UK	Grass	(Australia) Mark Philippoussis	7–6^{(7–5)}, 6–2, 7–6^{(7–3)}
Runner-up	8.	13 July 2003	Gstaad, Switzerland	Clay	(Czech Republic) Jiří Novák	7–5, 3–6, 3–6, 6–1, 3–6
Winner	10.	12 October 2003	Vienna, Austria (2)	Hard (i)	(Spain) Carlos Moyá	6–3, 6–3, 6–3
Winner	11.	16 November 2003	Year-End Championships, Houston, USA	Hard	(United States) Andre Agassi	6–3, 6–0, 6–4

== Prize money earnings ==
Event	Prize money	Year-to-date
Qatar Open	$29,000	$29,000
Adidas International	$3,420	$32,420
Australian Open	$41,068	$73,488
Australian Open (doubles)	$8,565	$82,053
Open 13	$69,200	$151,253
ABN AMRO World Tennis Tournament	$42,700	$193,953
ABN AMRO World Tennis Tournament (doubles)	$12,500	$206,453
Dubai Duty Free Tennis Championships	$187,500	$393,953
Pacific Life Open	$15,000	$408,953
Pacific Life Open (doubles)	$7,100	$416,053
NASDAQ-100 Open	$66,500	$482,553
NASDAQ-100 Open (doubles)	$65,000	$547,553
BMW Open	$52,000	$599,553
Internazionali BNL d'Italia	$200,000	$799,553
Internazionali BNL d'Italia (doubles)	$7,100	$806,653
Hamburg Masters	$27,000	$833,653
French Open	$14,790	$848,443
Gerry Weber Open	$113,000	$961,443
Gerry Weber Open (doubles)	$4,335	$965,778
The Championships, Wimbledon	$956,802	$1,922,580
Allianz Suisse Open Gstaad	$45,000	$1,967,580
Rogers AT&T Cup	$100,000	$2,067,580
Western & Southern Financial Group Masters	$15,000	$2,082,580
US Open	$65,000	$2,147,580
CA-TennisTrophy	$128,000	$2,275,580
CA-TennisTrophy (doubles)	$19,000	$2,294,580
Mutua Madrileña Masters Madrid	$112,500	$2,407,080
Davidoff Swiss Indoors	$17,000	$2,424,080
BNP Paribas Masters	$56,600	$2,480,680
Tennis Masters Cup	$1,520,000	$4,000,680
		$4,000,680

== See also ==
- Roger Federer
- Roger Federer career statistics
