= 2003 ABN AMRO World Tennis Tournament =

- Date: 17–23 February
- Edition: 31st
- Category: ATP International Series Gold
- Draw: 32S / 16D
- Prize money: $800,000
- Surface: Hardcourt / Indoor
- Location: Rotterdam, Netherlands
- Venue: Rotterdam Ahoy

Champions

Singles
- (Belarus) Max Mirnyi

Doubles
- (Australia) Wayne Arthurs / (Australia) Paul Hanley
- ABN AMRO World Tennis Tournament

The 2003 ABN AMRO World Tennis Tournament was a men's tennis tournament played on indoor hard courts at Rotterdam Ahoy in the Netherlands. It was part of the International Series Gold of the 2003 ATP Tour. The tournament ran from 17 February through 23 February 2003. Unseeded Max Mirnyi won the singles title.

The singles draw featured Association of Tennis Professionals (ATP) No. 3, Australian Open quarterfinalist, Tennis Masters Cup and Sydney runner-up Juan Carlos Ferrero, Doha quarterfinalist and Marseille winner Roger Federer and Sydney quarterfinalist and Paris Masters champion Marat Safin. Other seeded players were French Open champion Albert Costa, Wimbledon semifinalist Tim Henman, Sébastien Grosjean, Àlex Corretja and Sjeng Schalken.

== Finals ==
=== Singles ===
(Belarus) Max Mirnyi defeated (Netherlands) Raemon Sluiter 7–6^{(7–3)}, 6–4

- It was Mirnyi's 1st title of the year and the 14th of his career.

=== Doubles ===
(Australia) Wayne Arthurs / (Australia) Paul Hanley defeated (Switzerland) Roger Federer / (Belarus) Max Mirnyi 7–6^{(7–2)}, 6–2

- It was Arthurs' 1st title of the year and the 7th of his career. It was Hanley's 2nd title of the year and the 3rd of his career.
