= 2005 Medibank International – Men's doubles =

Men's doubles
- 2005 Medibank International

Final
- Champions: (India) Mahesh Bhupathi (Australia) Todd Woodbridge
- Runners-up: (France) Arnaud Clément (France) Michaël Llodra
- Score: 6–3, 6–3

Events
Singles	men	women
Doubles	men	women
← 2004 ·	Sydney International	· 2006 →

Jonas Björkman and Todd Woodbridge were the defending champions, but Björkman did not compete this year. Woodbridge partnered with Mahesh Bhupathi and successfully defended his title, by defeating Arnaud Clément and Michaël Llodra 6–3, 6–3 in the final.

It was the 37th title for Bhupathi and the 83rd (and final) title for Woodbridge in their respective doubles careers. It was also the 1st title for both players in the season.

== Seeds ==
1. (The Bahamas) Mark Knowles / (Canada) Daniel Nestor (first round)
2. (United States) Bob Bryan / (United States) Mike Bryan (first round)
3. (India) Mahesh Bhupathi / (Australia) Todd Woodbridge (champions)
4. (Zimbabwe) Wayne Black / (Zimbabwe) Kevin Ullyett (quarterfinals)

== Draw ==
=== Key ===
- Q = Qualifier
- WC = Wild card
- LL = Lucky loser
- Alt = Alternate
- SE = Special exempt
- PR = Protected ranking
- ITF = ITF entry
- JE = Junior exempt
- w/o = Walkover
- r = Retired
- d = Defaulted
- SR = Special ranking

=== Draw ===
First round
1	(The Bahamas) M Knowles (Canada) D Nestor	4	7	6^{6}
(Czech Republic) T Berdych (Czech Republic) R Štěpánek	6	5	7^{8}
(Israel) J Erlich (Israel) A Ram	6	5	6^{4}
(Russia) I Andreev (Russia) N Davydenko	4	7	7^{7}
4	(Zimbabwe) W Black (Zimbabwe) K Ullyett	6	6
(Czech Republic) F Čermák (Czech Republic) L Friedl	2	2
(France) A Clément (France) M Llodra	7	6
WC	(Australia) C Guccione (Australia) T Reid	5	1
(India) L Paes (Serbia and Montenegro) N Zimonjić	1	6	6
(Spain) F López (Spain) F Verdasco	6	4	3
(United States) M Fish (United States) B MacPhie	2	3
3	(India) M Bhupathi (Australia) T Woodbridge	6	6
(Austria) J Melzer (Belarus) M Mirnyi	4	6	7^{7}
WC	(Australia) N Healey (Australia) M Kimmich	6	3	6^{3}
(Czech Republic) M Damm (United States) J Palmer	6	6
2	(United States) B Bryan (United States) M Bryan	2	3

Quarterfinals
(Czech Republic) T Berdych (Czech Republic) R Štěpánek	1	r
(Russia) I Andreev (Russia) N Davydenko	2
4	(Zimbabwe) W Black (Zimbabwe) K Ullyett	3	4
(France) A Clément (France) M Llodra	6	6
(India) L Paes (Serbia and Montenegro) N Zimonjić	3	r
3	(India) M Bhupathi (Australia) T Woodbridge	1
(Austria) J Melzer (Belarus) M Mirnyi	5	7	7^{7}
(Czech Republic) M Damm (United States) J Palmer	7	5	6^{5}

Semifinals
(Russia) I Andreev (Russia) N Davydenko	6^{9}	3
(France) A Clément (France) M Llodra	7^{11}	6
3	(India) M Bhupathi (Australia) T Woodbridge	6	6
(Austria) J Melzer (Belarus) M Mirnyi	1	3

Final
(France) A Clément (France) M Llodra	3	3
3	(India) M Bhupathi (Australia) T Woodbridge	6	6
