= 2004 Adidas International – Men's doubles =

Men's doubles
- 2004 Adidas International

Final
- Champions: (Sweden) Jonas Björkman (Australia) Todd Woodbridge
- Runners-up: (United States) Bob Bryan (United States) Mike Bryan
- Score: 7–6^{(7–3)}, 7–5

Events
Singles	men	women
Doubles	men	women
← 2003 ·	Sydney International	· 2005 →

Paul Hanley and Nathan Healey were the defending champions but they competed with different partners that year, Hanley with Wayne Arthurs and Healey with Jordan Kerr.

Healey and Kerr lost in the first round to Bob Bryan and Mike Bryan.

Arthurs and Hanley lost in the quarterfinals to Yves Allegro and Rainer Schüttler.

Jonas Björkman and Todd Woodbridge won in the final 7–6^{(7–3)}, 7–5 against the Bryans.

== Seeds ==
Champion seeds are indicated in bold text while text in italics indicates the round in which those seeds were eliminated.

1. (United States) Bob Bryan / (United States) Mike Bryan (final)
2. (Sweden) **Jonas Björkman** / (Australia) **Todd Woodbridge (champions)**
3. (The Bahamas) Mark Knowles / (Canada) Daniel Nestor (first round)
4. (Australia) Wayne Arthurs / (Australia) Paul Hanley (quarterfinals)

== Draw ==
Key

- Q = Qualifier
- WC = Wild card
- LL = Lucky loser
- Alt = Alternate
- ITF = ITF entry
- PR = Protected ranking
- SR = Special ranking
- SE = Special exempt
- JE = Junior exempt
- JR = Junior Accelerator Programme entrant
- CO = College Accelerator Programme entrant
- NG = Next Gen Accelerator Program entrant
- w/o = Walkover
- r = Retired
- d = Defaulted

First round
1	(United States) **B Bryan** (United States) **M Bryan**	6^{4}	**6**	**6**
WC	(Australia) N Healey (Australia) J Kerr	**7^{7}**	4	3
(Australia) J Eagle (Serbia and Montenegro) N Zimonjić	3	**6**	0
(Israel) **J Erlich** (Argentina) **S Prieto**	**6**	3	**6**
4	(Australia) **W Arthurs** (Australia) **P Hanley**	**7**	**6**
(Argentina) L Arnold (Argentina) M Hood	5	3
(Belgium) T Vanhoudt (Netherlands) M Verkerk	**6**	6^{8}	5
(Switzerland) **Y Allegro** (Germany) **R Schüttler**	3	**7^{10}**	**7**
(Argentina) J I Chela (Chile) N Massú	4	1
(Czech Republic) **M Damm** (Czech Republic) **C Suk**	**6**	**6**
(Argentina) **A Calleri** (Italy) **F Volandri**	**7**	**7**
3	(The Bahamas) M Knowles (Canada) D Nestor	5	5
WC	(Australia) A Fisher (Australia) T Perry	2	3
(Belgium) **O Rochus** (Zimbabwe) **K Ullyett**	**6**	**6**
(Spain) A Costa (Spain) F López	3	2
2	(Sweden) **J Björkman** (Australia) **T Woodbridge**	**6**	**6**

Quarterfinals
1	(United States) **B Bryan** (United States) **M Bryan**	**6**	6^{3}	**7**
(Israel) J Erlich (Argentina) S Prieto	4	**7^{7}**	5
4	(Australia) W Arthurs (Australia) P Hanley	3	5
(Switzerland) **Y Allegro** (Germany) **R Schüttler**	**6**	**7**
(Czech Republic) M Damm (Czech Republic) C Suk	6^{6}	6^{9}
(Argentina) **A Calleri** (Italy) **F Volandri**	**7^{8}**	**7^{11}**
(Belgium) O Rochus (Zimbabwe) K Ullyett	4	3
2	(Sweden) **J Björkman** (Australia) **T Woodbridge**	**6**	**6**

Semifinals
1	(United States) **B Bryan** (United States) **M Bryan**	**5**
(Switzerland) Y Allegro (Germany) R Schüttler	2	r
(Argentina) A Calleri (Italy) F Volandri	6^{3}	2
2	(Sweden) **J Björkman** (Australia) **T Woodbridge**	**7^{7}**	**6**

Final
1	(United States) Bob Bryan (United States) Mike Bryan	6^{3}	5
2	(Sweden) **Jonas Björkman** (Australia) **Todd Woodbridge**	**7^{7}**	**7**
