= 2003 Open 13 – Doubles =

Doubles
- 2003 Open 13

Final
- Champions: (France) Sébastien Grosjean (France) Fabrice Santoro
- Runners-up: (Czech Republic) Tomáš Cibulec (Czech Republic) Pavel Vízner
- Score: 6–1, 6–4

Events
Singles	Doubles
← 2002 ·	Open 13	· 2004 →

Arnaud Clément and Nicolas Escudé were the defending champions but only Escudé competed that year with Nenad Zimonjić.

Escudé and Zimonjić lost in the semifinals to Tomáš Cibulec and Pavel Vízner.

Sébastien Grosjean and Fabrice Santoro won in the final 6–1, 6–4 against Tomáš Cibulec and Pavel Vízner.

== Seeds ==
1. (Sweden) Jonas Björkman / (Zimbabwe) Kevin Ullyett (quarterfinals)
2. (India) Mahesh Bhupathi / (Australia) Joshua Eagle (first round)
3. (Russia) Yevgeny Kafelnikov / (United States) Jared Palmer (first round)
4. (Czech Republic) Martin Damm / (Czech Republic) Petr Luxa (quarterfinals)

== Draw ==
=== Key ===
- Q = Qualifier
- WC = Wild card
- LL = Lucky loser
- Alt = Alternate
- SE = Special exempt
- PR = Protected ranking
- ITF = ITF entry
- JE = Junior exempt
- w/o = Walkover
- r = Retired
- d = Defaulted
- SR = Special ranking

First round
1	(Sweden) J Björkman (Zimbabwe) K Ullyett	w/o
(Finland) J Nieminen (Germany) R Schüttler
(Australia) W Arthurs (Australia) P Hanley	4	4
(Czech Republic) T Cibulec (Czech Republic) P Vízner	6	6
3	(Russia) Y Kafelnikov (United States) J Palmer	4	4
WC	(France) A Dupuis (France) C Saulnier	6	6
(Spain) F López (Spain) T Robredo	3	2
(France) N Escudé (Serbia and Montenegro) N Zimonjić	6	6
WC	(Morocco) H Arazi (Morocco) Y El Aynaoui	0	1
(France) S Grosjean (France) F Santoro	6	6
(South Africa) D Adams (South Africa) R Koenig	7^{7}	4	2
4	(Czech Republic) M Damm (Czech Republic) P Luxa	6^{3}	6	6
(Croatia) I Ljubičić (United States) J Tarango	4	6	6
(Australia) M Hill (Switzerland) M Kratochvil	6	4	1
(Slovakia) D Hrbatý (Czech Republic) P Pála	7^{7}	6
2	(India) M Bhupathi (Australia) J Eagle	6^{3}	4

Quarterfinals
1	(Sweden) J Björkman (Zimbabwe) K Ullyett	4	2
(Czech Republic) T Cibulec (Czech Republic) P Vízner	6	6
WC	(France) A Dupuis (France) C Saulnier	4	3
(France) N Escudé (Serbia and Montenegro) N Zimonjić	6	6
(France) S Grosjean (France) F Santoro	6	6
4	(Czech Republic) M Damm (Czech Republic) P Luxa	3	4
(Croatia) I Ljubičić (United States) J Tarango
(Slovakia) D Hrbatý (Czech Republic) P Pála	w/o

Semifinals
(Czech Republic) T Cibulec (Czech Republic) P Vízner	w/o
(France) N Escudé (Serbia and Montenegro) N Zimonjić
(France) S Grosjean (France) F Santoro	4	6	6
(Slovakia) D Hrbatý (Czech Republic) P Pála	6	1	2

Final
(Czech Republic) T Cibulec (Czech Republic) P Vízner	1	4
(France) S Grosjean (France) F Santoro	6	6
