= 2006 Medibank International =

- Date: 9–17 January
- Edition: 114th
- Surface: Hard / Outdoor
- Location: Sydney, Australia
- Venue: NSW Tennis Centre

Champions

Men's singles
- (United States) James Blake

Women's singles
- (Belgium) Justine Henin-Hardenne

Men's doubles
- (France) Fabrice Santoro / (Serbia and Montenegro) Nenad Zimonjić

Women's doubles
- (United States) Corina Morariu / (Australia) Rennae Stubbs
- Medibank International

The 2006 Medibank International was a tennis tournament played on outdoor hard courts. It was the 114th edition of the event known that year as the Medibank International, and was part of the International Series of the 2006 ATP Tour, and of the Tier II Series of the 2006 WTA Tour. Both the men's and the women's events took place at the NSW Tennis Centre in Sydney, Australia, from 9 through 17 January 2006.

== Finals ==
=== Men's singles ===
(United States) James Blake defeated (Russia) Igor Andreev, 6–2, 3–6, 7–6^{(7–3)}

=== Women's singles ===
(Belgium) Justine Henin-Hardenne defeated (Italy) Francesca Schiavone, 4–6, 7–5, 7–5

=== Men's doubles ===
(France) Fabrice Santoro / (Serbia and Montenegro) Nenad Zimonjić defeated (Czech Republic) František Čermák / (Czech Republic) Leoš Friedl, 6–1, 6–4

=== Women's doubles ===
(United States) Corina Morariu / (Australia) Rennae Stubbs defeated (Spain) Virginia Ruano Pascual / (Argentina) Paola Suárez, 6–3, 5–7, 6–2
