= 2004 Adidas International – Women's singles =

Women's singles
- 2004 Adidas International

Final
- Champion: (Belgium) Justine Henin-Hardenne
- Runner-up: (France) Amélie Mauresmo
- Score: 6–4, 6–4

Details
- Draw: 28
- Seeds: 8

Events
Singles	men	women
Doubles	men	women
- Sydney International

Kim Clijsters was the defending champion, but was forced to withdraw due to a left ankle injury.

Justine Henin-Hardenne won the title by defeating Amélie Mauresmo 6–4, 6–4 in the final.

== Seeds ==
The first four seeds received a bye into the second round.

1. (Belgium) Justine Henin-Hardenne (champion)
2. (Belgium) ~~Kim Clijsters~~ (withdrew due to a left ankle injury)
3. (France) Amélie Mauresmo (final)
4. (United States) Lindsay Davenport (semifinals, withdrew)
5. (Russia) Anastasia Myskina (quarterfinals)
6. (Russia) Elena Dementieva (quarterfinals)
7. (United States) Chanda Rubin (quarterfinals)
8. (Japan) Ai Sugiyama (first round)

== Draw ==
Key

- Q = Qualifier
- WC = Wild card
- LL = Lucky loser
- Alt = Alternate
- ITF = ITF entry
- PR = Protected ranking
- SR = Special ranking
- SE = Special exempt
- JE = Junior exempt
- JR = Junior Accelerator Programme entrant
- CO = College Accelerator Programme entrant
- NG = Next Gen Accelerator Program entrant
- w/o = Walkover
- r = Retired
- d = Defaulted

=== Finals ===
Semifinals
1	(Belgium) Justine Henin-Hardenne	w/o
4	(United States) Lindsay Davenport
3	(France) Amélie Mauresmo	6	7^{7}
(Italy) Francesca Schiavone	3	6^{2}

Final
1	(Belgium) Justine Henin-Hardenne	6	6
3	(France) Amélie Mauresmo	4	4

=== Top half ===
First round
(Spain) C Martínez	6	6
(Bulgaria) M Maleeva	0	0
(Russia) L Krasnoroutskaya	6	6
(Slovakia) D Hantuchová	2	2
WC	(Australia) C Watson	6^{3}	2
7	(United States) C Rubin	7^{7}	6
WC	(Australia) N Pratt	2	3
(Russia) V Zvonareva	6	6
(Spain) M Serna	4	1
(Russia) E Bovina	6	6
Q	(United States) A Cargill	0	6	3
6	(Russia) E Dementieva	6	0	6

Second round
1	(Belgium) J Henin-Hardenne	6	6
(Spain) C Martínez	4	1
(Russia) L Krasnoroutskaya	5	2
7	(United States) C Rubin	7	6
4	(United States) L Davenport	1	6	7
(Russia) V Zvonareva	6	2	5
(Russia) E Bovina	2	3
6	(Russia) E Dementieva	6	6

Quarterfinals
1	(Belgium) J Henin-Hardenne	6	4	6
7	(United States) C Rubin	3	6	4
4	(United States) L Davenport	6	6
6	(Russia) E Dementieva	3	4

Semifinals
1	(Belgium) J Henin-Hardenne	w/o
4	(United States) L Davenport

=== Bottom half ===
First round
5	(Russia) A Myskina	6	2	6
(United States) L Raymond	1	6	4
(South Africa) A Coetzer	4	6	6
(Switzerland) P Schnyder	6	3	0
(United States) M Shaughnessy	6	6
Q	(Sweden) Å Svensson	1	2
8	(Japan) A Sugiyama	2	3
WC	(France) N Dechy	6	6
(Italy) F Schiavone	6	3	6
Q	(Serbia and Montenegro) J Janković	4	6	4
Q	(Switzerland) M Casanova	3	3
(Israel) A Smashnova-Pistolesi	6	6

Second round
5	(Russia) A Myskina	6	6
(South Africa) A Coetzer	3	0
(United States) M Shaughnessy	2	3
3	(France) A Mauresmo	6	6
WC	(France) N Dechy	0	4
(Italy) F Schiavone	6	6
(Israel) A Smashnova-Pistolesi	4	7^{7}	6
LL	(Czech Republic) D Chládková	6	6^{3}	1

Quarterfinals
5	(Russia) A Myskina	4	6^{4}
3	(France) A Mauresmo	6	7^{7}
(Italy) F Schiavone	6	6
(Israel) A Smashnova-Pistolesi	2	2

Semifinals
3	(France) A Mauresmo	6	7^{7}
(Italy) F Schiavone	3	6^{2}
