= 2006 Medibank International – Men's singles =

Men's singles
- 2006 Medibank International

Final
- Champion: (United States) James Blake
- Runner-up: (Russia) Igor Andreev
- Score: 6–2, 3–6, 7–6^{(7–3)}

Details
- Draw: 32
- Seeds: 8

Events
Singles	men	women
Doubles	men	women
← 2005 ·	Sydney International	· 2007 →

Lleyton Hewitt was the two-time defending champion, but lost in the quarterfinals to Andreas Seppi.

James Blake won in the final 6–2, 3–6, 7–6^{(7–3)} against Igor Andreev.

== Seeds ==
1. (Australia) Lleyton Hewitt (quarterfinals)
2. (Russia) Nikolay Davydenko (semifinals)
3. (Sweden) Thomas Johansson (withdrew due to triceps injury)
4. (France) Richard Gasquet (first round)
5. (Spain) Juan Carlos Ferrero (first round)
6. (Spain) Tommy Robredo (first round)
7. (France) Radek Štěpánek (first round)
8. (United States) James Blake (champion)

== Draw ==
=== Key ===
- Q = Qualifier
- WC = Wild card
- LL = Lucky loser
- Alt = Alternate
- ITF = ITF entry
- PR = Protected ranking
- SR = Special ranking
- SE = Special exempt
- JE = Junior exempt
- JR = Junior Accelerator Programme entrant
- CO = College Accelerator Programme entrant
- NG = Next Gen Accelerator Program entrant
- w/o = Walkover
- r = Retired
- d = Defaulted

=== Finals ===
Semifinals
Q	(Italy) Andreas Seppi	2	6	2
(Russia) Igor Andreev	6	2	6
8	(United States) James Blake	6	6
2	(Russia) Nikolay Davydenko	4	2

Final
(Russia) Igor Andreev	2	6	6^{3}
8	(United States) James Blake	6	3	7^{7}

=== Top half ===
First round
1	(Australia) L Hewitt	2	7	6
Q	(United States) V Spadea	6	5	3
(Austria) J Melzer	6	7
(Argentina) JI Chela	2	6
Q	(Italy) A Seppi	6	6^{3}	6
SE	(Belgium) K Vliegen	3	7	3
WC	(Australia) C Guccione	3	6	7
5	(Spain) JC Ferrero	6	3	5
(Russia) I Andreev	6	6
4	(France) R Gasquet	2	4
WC	(Australia) P Luczak	7^{7}	7^{7}
(Belgium) X Malisse	6^{5}	6^{3}
(France) F Serra	5	6	6
(France) F Santoro	7	2	4
(Russia) D Tursunov	7^{7}	6
6	(Spain) T Robredo	6^{4}	3

Second round
1	(Australia) L Hewitt	6	6
(Austria) J Melzer	1	4
Q	(Italy) A Seppi	7	7^{7}
WC	(Australia) C Guccione	5	6^{2}
(Russia) I Andreev	6^{6}	7^{7}	7^{8}
WC	(Australia) P Luczak	7^{8}	6^{5}	6^{6}
(France) F Serra	6^{3}	2
(Russia) D Tursunov	7^{7}	6

Quarterfinals
1	(Australia) L Hewitt	6	5	5
Q	(Italy) A Seppi	4	7	7
(Russia) I Andreev	6	3	6
(Russia) D Tursunov	2	6	4

Semifinals
Q	(Italy) A Seppi	2	6	2
(Russia) I Andreev	6	2	6

=== Bottom half ===
First round
8	(United States) J Blake	7^{7}	6
(Italy) D Sanguinetti	6^{4}	4
(Spain) C Moyá	5	7	7
(France) S Grosjean	7	5	6^{4}
Q	(France) A Clément	6	2	6
(United States) T Dent	1	6	2
LL	(Argentina) J Mónaco	6	6
(Spain) F Verdaco	3	2
(Thailand) P Srichaphan	6	6
7	(Czech Republic) R Štěpánek	3	4
Q	(Croatia) I Karlović	7^{9}	3	6
(Romania) V Hănescu	6^{7}	6	3
(Argentina) A Calleri	6	6
(France) P-H Mathieu	4	3
2	(Russia) N Davydenko	7^{7}	6
(Czech Republic) T Berdych	6^{4}	3

Second round
8	(United States) J Blake	w/o
(Spain) C Moyá
Q	(France) A Clément	7^{7}	6
LL	(Argentina) J Mónaco	6^{3}	3
(Thailand) P Srichaphan	7^{7}	7^{8}
Q	(Croatia) I Karlović	6^{5}	6^{6}
(Argentina) A Calleri	4	6^{4}
2	(Russia) N Davydenko	6	7^{7}

Quarterfinals
8	(United States) J Blake	3	6	6
Q	(France) A Clément	6	1	4
(Thailand) P Srichaphan
2	(Russia) N Davydenko	w/o

Semifinals
8	(United States) J Blake	6	6
2	(Russia) N Davydenko	4	2
