= 2004 Adidas International – Women's doubles =

Women's doubles
- 2004 Adidas International

Final
- Champions: (Zimbabwe) Cara Black (Australia) Rennae Stubbs
- Runners-up: (Russia) Dinara Safina (United States) Meghann Shaughnessy
- Score: 7–5, 3–6, 6–4

Events
Singles	men	women
Doubles	men	women
← 2003 ·	Sydney International	· 2005 →

Kim Clijsters and Ai Sugiyama were the defending champions, but Clijsters withdrew from the tournament due to a left ankle injury. Sugiyama teamed up with Liezel Huber and lost in the quarterfinals to Dinara Safina and Meghann Shaughnessy.

Cara Black and Rennae Stubbs won the title by defeating Dinara Safina and Meghann Shaughnessy 7–5, 3–6, 6–4 in the final.

== Seeds ==
1. (United States) Martina Navratilova / (United States) Lisa Raymond (quarterfinals)
2. (South Africa) Liezel Huber / (Japan) Ai Sugiyama (quarterfinals)
3. (Zimbabwe) Cara Black / (Australia) Rennae Stubbs (champions)
4. (Slovakia) Daniela Hantuchová / (Bulgaria) Magdalena Maleeva (quarterfinals)

== Draw ==
=== Key ===
- Q = Qualifier
- WC = Wild card
- LL = Lucky loser
- Alt = Alternate
- SE = Special exempt
- PR = Protected ranking
- ITF = ITF entry
- JE = Junior exempt
- w/o = Walkover
- r = Retired
- d = Defaulted
- SR = Special ranking

=== Draw ===
First round
1	(United States) M Navratilova (United States) L Raymond	6	6
(Romania) R Dragomir Ilie (Australia) N Pratt	0	2
(Switzerland) M Casanova (Switzerland) P Schnyder	7^{7}	3	4
PR	(United States) L Davenport (United States) C Morariu	6^{5}	6	6
3	(Zimbabwe) C Black (Australia) R Stubbs	6	6
Q	(United States) A Cargill (Czech Republic) D Chládková	0	4
WC	(Russia) A Myskina (Russia) V Zvonareva	4	6	4
(Slovenia) T Križan (Slovenia) K Srebotnik	6	1	6
(Russia) E Bovina (Spain) C Martínez	1	6	7
(Russia) E Dementieva (Russia) L Krasnoroutskaya	6	2	5
(Ukraine) T Perebiynis (Croatia) S Talaja	2	6	0
4	(Slovakia) D Hantuchová (Bulgaria) M Maleeva	6	4	6
WC	(Russia) D Safina (United States) M Shaughnessy	6	6
(United States) J Craybas (Sweden) Å Svensson	3	3
(Italy) F Schiavone (Spain) M Serna	1	1
2	(South Africa) L Huber (Japan) A Sugiyama	6	6

Quarterfinals
1	(United States) M Navratilova (United States) L Raymond	6^{5}	6	3
PR	(United States) L Davenport (United States) C Morariu	7^{7}	3	6
3	(Zimbabwe) C Black (Australia) R Stubbs	6	7
(Slovenia) T Križan (Slovenia) K Srebotnik	0	5
(Russia) E Bovina (Spain) C Martínez	6	3	6
4	(Slovakia) D Hantuchová (Bulgaria) M Maleeva	2	6	3
WC	(Russia) D Safina (United States) M Shaughnessy	6	6
2	(South Africa) L Huber (Japan) A Sugiyama	4	3

Semifinals
PR	(United States) L Davenport (United States) C Morariu	6	0^{r}
3	(Zimbabwe) C Black (Australia) R Stubbs	2	3
(Russia) E Bovina (Spain) C Martínez	2	3
WC	(Russia) D Safina (United States) M Shaughnessy	6	6

Final
3	(Zimbabwe) C Black (Australia) R Stubbs	7	3	6
WC	(Russia) D Safina (United States) M Shaughnessy	5	6	4
