= 2003 Open 13 – Singles =

Singles
- 2003 Open 13

Final
- Champion: (Switzerland) Roger Federer
- Runner-up: (Sweden) Jonas Björkman
- Score: 6–2, 7–6^{(8–6)}

Details
- Draw: 32 (4 Q / 3 WC )
- Seeds: 8

Events
Singles	Doubles
← 2002 ·	Open 13	· 2004 →

Thomas Enqvist was the defending champion but lost in the first round to Raemon Sluiter.

Roger Federer won in the final 6–2, 7–6^{(8–6)} against Jonas Björkman.

== Seeds ==
1. (Switzerland) Roger Federer (champion)
2. (Czech Republic) Jiří Novák (first round)
3. (France) Sébastien Grosjean (second round)
4. (Germany) ~~Rainer Schüttler~~ (withdrew because of an elbow injury)
5. (Morocco) Younes El Aynaoui (first round)
6. (Russia) Yevgeny Kafelnikov (first round)
7. (France) Fabrice Santoro (first round)
8. (Spain) Tommy Robredo (first round)

== Draw ==
=== Key ===
- Q = Qualifier
- WC = Wild card
- LL = Lucky loser
- Alt = Alternate
- ITF = ITF entry
- PR = Protected ranking
- SR = Special ranking
- SE = Special exempt
- JE = Junior exempt
- JR = Junior Accelerator Programme entrant
- CO = College Accelerator Programme entrant
- NG = Next Gen Accelerator Program entrant
- w/o = Walkover
- r = Retired
- d = Defaulted

=== Finals ===
Semifinals
1	(Switzerland) Roger Federer	7^{7}	6
(Slovakia) Karol Kučera	6^{5}	3
(Sweden) Jonas Björkman	w/o
(France) Nicolas Escudé

Final
1	(Switzerland) Roger Federer	6	7^{8}
(Sweden) Jonas Björkman	2	6^{6}

=== Top half ===
First round
1	(Switzerland) R Federer	7^{7}	0
(Croatia) I Ljubičić	6^{3}	0^{r}
(Finland) J Nieminen	6	4	7^{7}
(Czech Republic) R Štěpánek	2	6	6^{1}
(Netherlands) R Sluiter	7^{7}	7^{8}
(Sweden) T Enqvist	6^{4}	6^{6}
Q	(France) C Saulnier	2	6	6
7	(France) F Santoro	6	4	1
3	(France) S Grosjean	6	6
Q	(Spain) Á Calatrava	2	1
(Switzerland) M Kratochvil	6	4	1^{r}
(Slovakia) K Kučera	3	6	4
WC	(France) R Gasquet	6^{4}	6	6
(Spain) F López	7^{7}	4	4
(Belgium) O Rochus	7^{7}	6
WC/6	(Russia) Y Kafelnikov	6^{5}	4

Second round
1	(Switzerland) R Federer	6	6
(Finland) J Nieminen	3	3
(Netherlands) R Sluiter	7	6^{1}	6
Q	(France) C Saulnier	5	7^{7}	2
3	(France) S Grosjean	6^{4}	1
(Slovakia) K Kučera	7^{7}	6
WC	(France) R Gasquet	7^{7}	0^{r}
(Belgium) O Rochus	6^{1}	5

Quarterfinals
1	(Switzerland) R Federer	6	4	6
(Netherlands) R Sluiter	4	6	4
(Slovakia) K Kučera	6	6
(Belgium) O Rochus	3	3

Semifinals
1	(Switzerland) R Federer	7^{7}	6
(Slovakia) K Kučera	6^{5}	3

=== Bottom half ===
First round
WC/5	(Morocco) Y El Aynaoui	2	4
(Sweden) J Björkman	6	6
(Australia) W Arthurs	4	6^{4}
(Romania) A Voinea	6	7^{7}
(Slovakia) D Hrbatý	6	6
Q	(Morocco) H Arazi	1	3
(France) O Mutis	6	2	7
LL	(Germany) C Vinck	4	6	5
8	(Spain) T Robredo	6^{6}	6	6^{5}
(Belarus) M Mirnyi	7^{8}	1	7^{7}
Q	(France) R Cadart	6	6
(Georgia (country)) I Labadze	4	3
(France) A Dupuis	7^{7}	4	4
(Croatia) M Ančić	6^{4}	6	6
(France) N Escudé	6	6
2	(Czech Republic) J Novák	2	1

Second round
(Sweden) J Björkman	7^{8}	6^{6}	6
(Romania) A Voinea	6^{6}	7^{8}	3
(Slovakia) D Hrbatý	6	6
(France) O Mutis	3	4
(Belarus) M Mirnyi	6^{5}	2
Q	(France) R Cadart	7^{7}	6
(Croatia) M Ančić	2	6	6^{10}
(France) N Escudé	6	3	7^{12}

Quarterfinals
(Sweden) J Björkman	7^{9}	6
(Slovakia) D Hrbatý	6^{7}	4
Q	(France) R Cadart	5	3
(France) N Escudé	7	6

Semifinals
(Sweden) J Björkman	w/o
(France) N Escudé
