= 2001 Open 13 =

- Date: 12–19 February
- Edition: 9th
- Category: International Series
- Draw: 32S/ 16D
- Prize money: $475,000
- Surface: Hard / indoor
- Location: Marseille, France
- Venue: Palais des Sports de Marseille

Champions

Singles
- (Russia) Yevgeny Kafelnikov

Doubles
- (France) Julien Boutter / (France) Fabrice Santoro
- Open 13

The 2001 Open 13 was a tennis tournament played on indoor hard courts at the Palais des Sports de Marseille in Marseille in France and was part of the International Series of the 2001 ATP Tour. The tournament ran from February 12 through February 19, 2001.

== Finals ==
=== Singles ===
(Russia) Yevgeny Kafelnikov defeated (France) Sébastien Grosjean 7–6^{(7–5)}, 6–2

- It was Kafelnikov's 1st title of the year and the 44th of his career.

=== Doubles ===
(France) Julien Boutter / (France) Fabrice Santoro defeated (Australia) Michael Hill / (United States) Jeff Tarango 7–6^{(9–7)}, 7–5

- It was Boutter's 1st title of the year and the 3rd of his career. It was Santoro's only title of the year and the 11th of his career.
