= 2001 Open 13 – Singles =

Singles
- 2001 Open 13

Final
- Champion: (Russia) Yevgeny Kafelnikov
- Runner-up: (France) Sébastien Grosjean
- Score: 7–6^{(7–5)}, 6–2

Details
- Draw: 32 (4 Q / 3 WC )
- Seeds: 8

Events
Singles	Doubles
← 2000 ·	Open 13	· 2002 →

Marc Rosset was the defending champion but lost in the second round to Julien Boutter.

Yevgeny Kafelnikov won in the final 7–6^{(7–5)}, 6–2 against Sébastien Grosjean.

== Seeds ==
1. (Sweden) Magnus Norman (second round)
2. (Russia) Yevgeny Kafelnikov (champion)
3. (France) Arnaud Clément (second round)
4. (France) Sébastien Grosjean (final)
5. (France) Cédric Pioline (quarterfinals)
6. (Switzerland) Roger Federer (semifinals)
7. (Switzerland) Marc Rosset (second round)
8. (Sweden) Thomas Johansson (first round)

== Draw ==
=== Key ===
- Q = Qualifier
- WC = Wild card
- LL = Lucky loser
- Alt = Alternate
- SE = Special exempt
- PR = Protected ranking
- ITF = ITF entry
- JE = Junior exempt
- w/o = Walkover
- r = Retired
- d = Defaulted
- SR = Special ranking

=== Finals ===
Semifinals
(Belarus) Max Mirnyi	4	6^{7}
4	(France) Sébastien Grosjean	6	7^{9}
6	(Switzerland) Roger Federer	7^{7}	4	4
2	(Russia) Yevgeny Kafelnikov	6^{4}	6	6

Final
4	(France) Sébastien Grosjean	6^{5}	2
2	(Russia) Yevgeny Kafelnikov	7^{7}	6

=== Top half ===
First round
1	(Sweden) M Norman	7^{10}	7
(Belgium) O Rochus	6^{8}	5
(Belarus) M Mirnyi	7^{8}	6^{5}	6
(Spain) J Díaz	6^{6}	7^{7}	3
Q	(France) L Roux	1	7	4
(France) J Boutter	6	5	6
(Italy) G Pozzi	6	2	5
7	(Switzerland) M Rosset	2	6	7
4	(France) S Grosjean	7	7^{7}
(Croatia) I Ljubičić	5	6^{5}
(Ukraine) A Medvedev	4	6	4
(Czech Republic) J Vaněk	6	1	6
(United States) J Tarango	6^{5}	3^{r}
(Slovakia) K Kučera	7^{7}	5
(France) F Santoro	6	6
8	(Sweden) T Johansson	4	2

Second round
1	(Sweden) M Norman	2	6	3
(Belarus) M Mirnyi	6	3	6
(France) J Boutter	6	6
7	(Switzerland) M Rosset	3	4
4	(France) S Grosjean	6	6
(Czech Republic) J Vaněk	2	3
(Slovakia) K Kučera	6	7
(France) F Santoro	2	5

Quarterfinals
(Belarus) M Mirnyi	6	6
(France) J Boutter	2	3
4	(France) S Grosjean	6	6
(Slovakia) K Kučera	3	3

Semifinals
(Belarus) M Mirnyi	4	6^{7}
4	(France) S Grosjean	6	7^{9}

=== Bottom half ===
First round
6	(Switzerland) R Federer	7^{9}	6
WC	(France) C Saulnier	6^{7}	4
(France) N Escudé	7^{8}	6^{4}	4
Q	(United States) B Bryan	6^{6}	7^{7}	6
(Switzerland) M Kratochvil	6	6
(France) S Huet	4	1
WC	(Croatia) G Ivanišević	4	3
3	(France) A Clément	6	6
5	(France) C Pioline	2	6	6
(Spain) J Balcells	6	4	1
Q	(France) J-R Lisnard	7^{7}	6
(United States) J Gimelstob	6^{5}	2
Q	(France) N Mahut	7^{9}	6^{5}	6
(South Africa) N Godwin	6^{7}	7^{7}	2
WC	(France) J Golmard	3	2
2	(Russia) Y Kafelnikov	6	6

Second round
6	(Switzerland) R Federer	7^{7}	6
Q	(United States) B Bryan	6^{1}	3
(Switzerland) M Kratochvil	3	6	6
3	(France) A Clément	6	3	4
5	(France) C Pioline	6^{6}	6	6
Q	(France) J-R Lisnard	7^{8}	2	4
Q	(France) N Mahut	6	1	2
2	(Russia) Y Kafelnikov	4	6	6

Quarterfinals
6	(Switzerland) R Federer	6	7^{7}
(Switzerland) M Kratochvil	4	6^{4}
5	(France) C Pioline	5	7^{7}	2
2	(Russia) Y Kafelnikov	7	6^{5}	6

Semifinals
6	(Switzerland) R Federer	7^{7}	4	4
2	(Russia) Y Kafelnikov	6^{4}	6	6

== Qualifying ==
=== Qualifying seeds ===
1. (United States) Bob Bryan (qualified)
2. (Germany) Oliver Gross (qualifying competition, retired)
3. (France) Thierry Guardiola (first round)
4. (Brazil) Francisco Costa (first round)
5. (Spain) Salvador Navarro (second round)
6. (Czech Republic) Petr Kralert (first round)
7. (France) Jean-René Lisnard (qualified)
8. (France) Lionel Roux (qualified)

=== Qualifiers ===
1. (United States) Bob Bryan
2. (France) Lionel Roux
3. (France) Nicolas Mahut
4. (France) Jean-René Lisnard

=== Qualifying draw ===
==== First qualifier ====
First round
1	(United States) Bob Bryan	6	6
(Federal Republic of Yugoslavia) Nenad Zimonjić	4	1
(Australia) Michael Hill
(France) Mohamed-Sékou Dramé	w/o
(Finland) Kim Tiilikainen	1	6	6
(France) Xavier Pujo	6	3	3
(France) Éric Prodon	6^{4}	4
5	(Spain) Salvador Navarro	7^{7}	6

Second round
1	(United States) Bob Bryan	6	6
(France) Mohamed-Sékou Dramé	4	3
(Finland) Kim Tiilikainen	6	6
5	(Spain) Salvador Navarro	2	2

Qualifying competition
1	(United States) Bob Bryan	6	6
(Finland) Kim Tiilikainen	1	1

==== Second qualifier ====
First round
2	(Germany) Oliver Gross	6	3	7^{7}
(France) Thomas Dupré	1	6	6^{2}
(France) Johan Rousseaux	4	5
(France) Rodolphe Cadart	6	7
WC	(France) Cyril François	3	4
(France) Sébastien de Chaunac	6	6
(France) Julien Varlet	3	6	2
8	(France) Lionel Roux	6	3	6

Second round
2	(Germany) Oliver Gross	6	6^{1}	6
(France) Rodolphe Cadart	3	7^{7}	4
(France) Sébastien de Chaunac	6	6^{4}	6^{7}
8	(France) Lionel Roux	4	7^{7}	7^{9}

Qualifying competition
2	(Germany) Oliver Gross	6^{2}	r
8	(France) Lionel Roux	7^{7}

==== Third qualifier ====
First round
3	(France) Thierry Guardiola	6^{4}	3
(France) Nicolas Mahut	7^{7}	6
WC	(France) Thierry Roggi	1	0
(Italy) Renzo Furlan	6	6
(France) Jeremy Delinbeuf	7^{7}	4	2
(France) Julien Benneteau	6^{4}	6	6
(France) Julien Cuaz	3	6	6
6	(Czech Republic) Petr Kralert	6	2	4

Second round
(France) Nicolas Mahut	7	6
(Italy) Renzo Furlan	5	4
(France) Julien Benneteau	7^{7}	7^{7}
(France) Julien Cuaz	6^{1}	6^{2}

Qualifying competition
(France) Nicolas Mahut	6^{5}	7^{7}	6
(France) Julien Benneteau	7^{7}	6^{5}	2

==== Fourth qualifier ====
First round
4	(Brazil) Francisco Costa	5	6^{11}
(Russia) Andrei Cherkasov	7	7^{13}
(France) Sébastien Lami	6	6
WC	(France) Richard Gasquet	4	1
WC	(France) Nicolas Berenguer	6^{6}	6	6
(Italy) Davide Scala	7^{8}	2	2
(France) Jean-François Bachelot	6	4	5
7	(France) Jean-René Lisnard	3	6	7

Second round
(Russia) Andrei Cherkasov	5	6	1
(France) Sébastien Lami	7	4	6
WC	(France) Nicolas Berenguer	3	2
7	(France) Jean-René Lisnard	6	6

Qualifying competition
(France) Sébastien Lami	4	2
7	(France) Jean-René Lisnard	6	6
