= 2002 Open 13 – Doubles =

Doubles
- 2002 Open 13

Final
- Champions: (France) Arnaud Clément (France) Nicolas Escudé
- Runners-up: (France) Julien Boutter (Belarus) Max Mirnyi
- Score: 6–4, 6–3

Events
Singles	Doubles
← 2001 ·	Open 13	· 2003 →

Julien Boutter and Fabrice Santoro were the defending champions but only Boutter competed that year with Max Mirnyi.

Boutter and Mirnyi lost in the final 6–4, 6–3 against Arnaud Clément and Nicolas Escudé.

== Seeds ==
1. (France) Julien Boutter / (Belarus) Max Mirnyi (final)
2. (South Africa) David Adams / (Australia) Michael Hill (quarterfinals)
3. (Germany) Karsten Braasch / (Russia) Andrei Olhovskiy (semifinals)
4. (South Africa) Chris Haggard / (Belgium) Tom Vanhoudt (semifinals)

== Draw ==
=== Key ===
- Q = Qualifier
- WC = Wild card
- LL = Lucky loser
- Alt = Alternate
- SE = Special exempt
- PR = Protected ranking
- ITF = ITF entry
- JE = Junior exempt
- w/o = Walkover
- r = Retired
- d = Defaulted
- SR = Special ranking

First round
1	(France) J Boutter (Belarus) M Mirnyi	6	6
(Italy) M Bertolini (Italy) C Brandi	4	4
(Switzerland) M Rosset (United States) J Tarango	3	5
(Sweden) T Enqvist (Sweden) T Johansson	6	7
4	(South Africa) C Haggard (Belgium) T Vanhoudt	6	6
WC	(France) J-F Bachelot (France) P-H Mathieu	2	4
(Australia) J Kerr (Australia) G Silcock	7^{8}	7^{7}
(Israel) J Erlich (Israel) A Ram	6^{6}	6^{4}
(Spain) J C Ferrero (Spain) T Robredo	2	6	[7]
(Australia) B Ellwood (Australia) S Huss	6	4	[10]
WC	(Morocco) K Alami (Morocco) H Arazi
3	(Germany) K Braasch (Russia) A Olhovskiy	w/o
(France) A Clément (France) N Escudé	6	5	[11]
(Czech Republic) D Škoch (United States) J Waite	4	7	[9]
WC	(Morocco) Y El Aynaoui (France) C Pioline	6^{4}	7^{7}	[7]
2	(South Africa) D Adams (Australia) M Hill	7^{7}	6^{4}	[10]

Quarterfinals
1	(France) J Boutter (Belarus) M Mirnyi	6	7^{7}
(Sweden) T Enqvist (Sweden) T Johansson	2	6^{3}
4	(South Africa) C Haggard (Belgium) T Vanhoudt	7	7^{7}
(Australia) J Kerr (Australia) G Silcock	5	6^{5}
(Australia) B Ellwood (Australia) S Huss	6^{3}	6	[6]
3	(Germany) K Braasch (Russia) A Olhovskiy	7^{7}	4	[10]
(France) A Clément (France) N Escudé	6	6
2	(South Africa) D Adams (Australia) M Hill	3	4

Semifinals
1	(France) J Boutter (Belarus) M Mirnyi	7^{7}	7^{8}
4	(South Africa) C Haggard (Belgium) T Vanhoudt	6^{4}	6^{6}
3	(Germany) K Braasch (Russia) A Olhovskiy	5	7^{7}	[16]
(France) A Clément (France) N Escudé	7	6^{4}	[18]

Final
1	(France) J Boutter (Belarus) M Mirnyi	4	3
(France) A Clément (France) N Escudé	6	6
