= 2004 Adidas International =

Tennis tournament held in Sydney, Australia

- Date: 11–18 January
- Edition: 112th
- Surface: Hard / outdoor
- Location: Sydney, Australia
- Venue: NSW Tennis Centre

Champions

Men's singles
- (Australia) Lleyton Hewitt

Women's singles
- (Belgium) Justine Henin-Hardenne

Men's doubles
- (Sweden) Jonas Björkman / (Australia) Todd Woodbridge

Women's doubles
- (Zimbabwe) Cara Black / (Australia) Rennae Stubbs
- Adidas International

The 2004 Adidas International was a combine men's and women's tennis tournament played on outdoor hard courts at the NSW Tennis Centre in Sydney in Australia that was part of the International Series of the 2004 ATP Tour and of Tier II of the 2004 WTA Tour. The tournament ran from 11 through 18 January 2004. Lleyton Hewitt and Justine Henin-Hardenne won the singles titles.

== Finals ==
=== Men's singles ===
(Australia) Lleyton Hewitt defeated (Spain) Carlos Moyá 4–3 (Moyá retired)

- It was Hewitt's 1st title of the year and the 22nd of his career.

=== Women's singles ===
(Belgium) Justine Henin-Hardenne defeated (France) Amélie Mauresmo 6–4, 6–4

- It was Henin-Hardenne's 1st title of the year and the 17th of her career.

=== Men's doubles ===
(Sweden) Jonas Björkman / (Australia) Todd Woodbridge defeated (United States) Bob Bryan / (United States) Mike Bryan 7–6^{(7–3)}, 7–5

- It was Björkman's 1st title of the year and the 39th of his career. It was Woodbridge's 1st title of the year and the 81st of his career.

=== Women's doubles ===
(Zimbabwe) Cara Black / (Australia) Rennae Stubbs defeated (Russia) Dinara Safina / (United States) Meghann Shaughnessy 7–5, 3–6, 6–4

- It was Black's 1st title of the year and the 15th of her career. It was Stubbs' 1st title of the year and the 45th of her career.
