= 2005 Medibank International – Women's doubles =

Women's doubles
- 2005 Medibank International

Final
- Champions: (Australia) Bryanne Stewart (Australia) Samantha Stosur
- Runners-up: (Russia) Elena Dementieva (Japan) Ai Sugiyama
- Score: Walkover

Events
Singles	men	women
Doubles	men	women
← 2004 ·	Sydney International	· 2006 →

Cara Black and Rennae Stubbs were the defending champions, but Black did not compete this year. Stubbs partnered with Lisa Raymond and were eliminated in first round.

Bryanne Stewart and Samantha Stosur won the title by walkover, as Elena Dementieva (partnering with Ai Sugiyama) had to withdraw due to a heat illness. It was the 1st title for Stewart and the 1st title for Stosur, in their respective doubles careers.

== Seeds ==
1. (United States) Lisa Raymond / (Australia) Rennae Stubbs (first round)
2. (Spain) Conchita Martínez / (Spain) Virginia Ruano Pascual (semifinals)
3. (Russia) Elena Dementieva / (Japan) Ai Sugiyama (final, withdrew due to a heat illness on Dementieva)
4. (Austria) Barbara Schett / (Switzerland) Patty Schnyder (first round)

== Draw ==
=== Key ===
- Q = Qualifier
- WC = Wild card
- LL = Lucky loser
- Alt = Alternate
- SE = Special exempt
- PR = Protected ranking
- ITF = ITF entry
- JE = Junior exempt
- w/o = Walkover
- r = Retired
- d = Defaulted
- SR = Special ranking

=== Draw ===
First round
1	(United States) L Raymond (Australia) R Stubbs	6	6^{5}	4
(Australia) B Stewart (Australia) S Stosur	1	7^{7}	6
(Croatia) S Talaja (Italy) R Vinci	2	3
WC	(Australia) B Sekulovski (Australia) C Watson	6	6
4	(Austria) B Schett (Switzerland) P Schnyder	3	4
Q	(Russia) M Kirilenko (Belarus) A Yakimova	6	6
(Switzerland) E Gagliardi (Croatia) J Kostanić	2	2
(Chinese Taipei) J Lee (China) S Peng	6	6
(Italy) F Pennetta (Italy) F Schiavone	w	/	o
(Greece) E Daniilidou (France) T Golovin
(United States) L Davenport (United States) C Morariu	6	4	4
3	(Russia) E Dementieva (Japan) A Sugiyama	4	6	6
(South Africa) L Huber (Australia) L McShea	6	6
(Slovakia) D Hantuchová (United States) M Navratilova	3	4
(France) C Dhenin (United States) M Washington	0	0
2	(Spain) C Martínez (Spain) V Ruano Pascual	6	6

Quarterfinals
(Australia) B Stewart (Australia) S Stosur	6	4	6
WC	(Australia) B Sekulovski (Australia) C Watson	3	6	3
Q	(Russia) M Kirilenko (Belarus) A Yakimova	7	7
(Chinese Taipei) J Lee (China) S Peng	5	5
(Italy) F Pennetta (Italy) F Schiavone	3	6	6^{5}
3	(Russia) E Dementieva (Japan) A Sugiyama	6	2	7^{7}
(South Africa) L Huber (Australia) L McShea	4	1
2	(Spain) C Martínez (Spain) V Ruano Pascual	6	6

Semifinals
(Australia) B Stewart (Australia) S Stosur	w	/	o
Q	(Russia) M Kirilenko (Belarus) A Yakimova
3	(Russia) E Dementieva (Japan) A Sugiyama	6	6
2	(Spain) C Martínez (Spain) V Ruano Pascual	3	4

Final
(Australia) B Stewart (Australia) S Stosur	w	/	o
3	(Russia) E Dementieva (Japan) A Sugiyama
