= 2003 ABN AMRO World Tennis Tournament – Singles =

Singles
- 2003 ABN AMRO World Tennis Tournament

Final
- Champion: (Belarus) Max Mirnyi
- Runner-up: (Netherlands) Raemon Sluiter
- Score: 7–6^{(7–3)}, 6–4

Details
- Draw: 32
- Seeds: 8

Events
Singles	Doubles
← 2002 ·	ABN AMRO World Tennis Tournament	· 2004 →

Nicolas Escudé was the defending champion but lost in the quarterfinals against Sébastien Grosjean.

Max Mirnyi won in the final 7–6^{(7–3)}, 6–4 against Raemon Sluiter.

== Seeds ==
A champion seed is indicated in bold text while text in italics indicates the round in which that seed was eliminated.

1. (Spain) Juan Carlos Ferrero (quarterfinals, retired because of a sprained ankle)
2. (Switzerland) Roger Federer (semifinals)
3. (Russia) Marat Safin (second round)
4. (Spain) Albert Costa (first round)
5. (United Kingdom) Tim Henman (first round)
6. (France) Sébastien Grosjean (semifinals)
7. (Spain) Àlex Corretja (first round)
8. (Netherlands) Sjeng Schalken (quarterfinals)

== Draw ==
=== Key ===
- Q = Qualifier
- WC = Wild card
- LL = Lucky loser
- Alt = Alternate
- SE = Special exempt
- PR = Protected ranking
- ITF = ITF entry
- JE = Junior exempt
- w/o = Walkover
- r = Retired
- d = Defaulted
- SR = Special ranking

First round
1	(Spain) **J C Ferrero**	**7^{7}**	**7^{7}**
(Australia) W Arthurs	6^{4}	6^{5}
Q	(Netherlands) P Wessels	2	2
(Sweden) **J Björkman**	**6**	**6**
WC	(Netherlands) M Verkerk	**6**	4	6^{3}
WC	(Netherlands) **R Sluiter**	3	**6**	**7^{7}**
(Finland) **J Nieminen**	**6**	**6**
7	(Spain) À Corretja	4	0
4	(Spain) A Costa	3	3
(France) **N Escudé**	**6**	**6**
(Spain) T Robredo	6^{5}	**7^{7}**	2
WC	(Netherlands) **R Krajicek**	**7^{7}**	6^{5}	**6**
(Slovakia) **D Hrbatý**	**6**	**6**
(Romania) A Voinea	4	2
Q	(Italy) R Furlan	3	4
6	(France) **S Grosjean**	**6**	**6**
5	(United Kingdom) T Henman	4	2
(Croatia) **I Ljubičić**	**6**	**6**
Q	(Croatia) M Ančić	**7^{7}**	6^{5}	4
(Belarus) **M Mirnyi**	6^{5}	**7^{7}**	**6**
(Spain) F López	2	0
(Russia) **Y Kafelnikov**	**6**	**6**
(Belgium) X Malisse	5	3
3	(Russia) **M Safin**	**7**	**6**
8	(Netherlands) **S Schalken**	**6**	**6**
Q	(Belgium) C Rochus	3	3
(Belgium) **O Rochus**	**6**	**6**
(Austria) S Koubek	2	1
(Romania) A Pavel	4	**6**	2
(France) **F Santoro**	**6**	4	**6**
(Sweden) T Enqvist	**6**	3	4
2	(Switzerland) **R Federer**	3	**6**	**6**

Second round
1	(Spain) **J C Ferrero**	3	**6**	**6**
(Sweden) J Björkman	**6**	4	1
WC	(Netherlands) **R Sluiter**	**7^{9}**	2	**6**
(Finland) J Nieminen	6^{7}	**6**	3
(France) **N Escudé**	**6**	6^{1}	**7^{7}**
WC	(Netherlands) R Krajicek	3	**7^{7}**	6^{4}
(Slovakia) D Hrbatý	5	3
6	(France) **S Grosjean**	**7**	**6**
(Croatia) I Ljubičić	2^{r}
(Belarus) **M Mirnyi**	4
(Russia) **Y Kafelnikov**	4	**7^{7}**	**6**
3	(Russia) M Safin	**6**	6^{5}	4
8	(Netherlands) **S Schalken**	**7**	**6**
(Belgium) O Rochus	5	2
(France) F Santoro	0	4
2	(Switzerland) **R Federer**	**6**	**6**

Quarterfinals
1	(Spain) J C Ferrero	2^{r}
WC	(Netherlands) **R Sluiter**	1
(France) N Escudé	**7**	6^{3}	4^{r}
6	(France) **S Grosjean**	5	**7^{7}**	4
(Belarus) **M Mirnyi**	**7^{7}**	**7^{7}**
(Russia) Y Kafelnikov	6^{5}	6^{4}
8	(Netherlands) S Schalken	2	4
2	(Switzerland) **R Federer**	**6**	**6**

Semifinals
WC	(Netherlands) **R Sluiter**	**6**	**6**
6	(France) S Grosjean	3	3
(Belarus) **M Mirnyi**	5	**6**	**6**
2	(Switzerland) R Federer	**7**	3	4

Final
WC	(Netherlands) Raemon Sluiter	6^{3}	4
(Belarus) **Max Mirnyi**	**7^{7}**	**6**
