= 2004 Adidas International – Men's singles =

Men's singles
- 2004 Adidas International

Final
- Champion: (Australia) Lleyton Hewitt
- Runner-up: (Spain) Carlos Moyá
- Score: 4–3 (Moyá retired)

Details
- Draw: 32
- Seeds: 8

Events
Singles	men	women
Doubles	men	women
← 2003 ·	Sydney International	· 2005 →

Hyung-Taik Lee was the defending champion but did not compete that year.

Lleyton Hewitt won the final 4–3 after Carlos Moyá was forced to retire.

== Seeds ==
A champion seed is indicated in bold text while text in italics indicates the round in which that seed was eliminated.

1. (Spain) Juan Carlos Ferrero (first round)
2. (Germany) Rainer Schüttler (first round)
3. (Spain) Carlos Moyá (final)
4. (Australia) Mark Philippoussis (quarterfinals)
5. (Thailand) Paradorn Srichaphan (second round)
6. (Chile) Nicolás Massú (first round)
7. (Australia) **Lleyton Hewitt (champion)**
8. (Netherlands) Martin Verkerk (semifinals)

== Draw ==
=== Key ===
- Q = Qualifier
- WC = Wild card
- LL = Lucky loser
- Alt = Alternate
- SE = Special exempt
- PR = Protected ranking
- ITF = ITF entry
- JE = Junior exempt
- w/o = Walkover
- r = Retired
- d = Defaulted
- SR = Special ranking

First round
1	(Spain) J C Ferrero	3	6^{6}
WC	(Australia) **C Guccione**	**6**	**7^{8}**
(South Africa) **W Ferreira**	**6**	**6**
(United States) J Blake	2	4
Q	(France) R Gasquet	0	r
(Spain) **F Mantilla**	**3**
WC	(Australia) **T Reid**	**7^{7}**	2	**6**
6	(Chile) N Massú	6^{5}	**6**	3
3	(Spain) **C Moyá**	**7**	**6**
Q	(United States) A Bogomolov Jr.	5	4
SE	(France) **M Llodra**	**6**	**6**
(Russia) M Youzhny	4	2
(Spain) **T Robredo**	**6**	**6**
(Spain) A Costa	2	3
(Sweden) J Björkman	5	**6**	1
5	(Thailand) **P Srichaphan**	**7**	1	**6**
8	(Netherlands) **M Verkerk**	**6**	**6**
WC	(Australia) W Arthurs	4	4
(Argentina) A Calleri	5	3
(Belarus) **M Mirnyi**	**7**	**6**
(United Kingdom) **G Rusedski**	**7^{7}**	**7^{7}**
(Argentina) J I Chela	6^{1}	6^{5}
Q	(Spain) R Ramírez Hidalgo	4	**7**	2
4	(Australia) **M Philippoussis**	**6**	5	**6**
7	(Australia) **L Hewitt**	**6**	**6**
(Armenia) S Sargsian	4	2
(Spain) F López	**7^{7}**	6^{4}	3
(Slovakia) **K Kučera**	6^{3}	**7^{7}**	**6**
(France) **A Clément**	**6**	**6**
(United States) M Fish	3	3
Q	(Sweden) **J Johansson**	**6**	**6**
2	(Germany) R Schüttler	4	4

Second round
WC	(Australia) C Guccione	6^{4}	5
(South Africa) **W Ferreira**	**7^{7}**	**7**
(Spain) F Mantilla	4	1
WC	(Australia) **T Reid**	**6**	**6**
3	(Spain) **C Moyá**	**7^{7}**	**6**
SE	(France) M Llodra	6^{5}	3
(Spain) **T Robredo**	4	**6**	**7^{7}**
5	(Thailand) P Srichaphan	**6**	1	6^{3}
8	(Netherlands) **M Verkerk**	6^{0}	**7^{8}**	**7^{7}**
(Belarus) M Mirnyi	**7^{7}**	6^{6}	6^{5}
(United Kingdom) G Rusedski	3	**6**	4
4	(Australia) **M Philippoussis**	**6**	1	**6**
7	(Australia) **L Hewitt**	**6**	**6**
(Slovakia) K Kučera	4	1
(France) **A Clément**	**6**	**7**
Q	(Sweden) J Johansson	4	5

Quarterfinals
(South Africa) **W Ferreira**	**6**	**6**
WC	(Australia) T Reid	4	4
3	(Spain) **C Moyá**	**6**	**6**
(Spain) T Robredo	1	2
8	(Netherlands) **M Verkerk**	**6**	**7^{7}**
4	(Australia) M Philippoussis	4	6^{4}
7	(Australia) **L Hewitt**	**6**	4	**6**
(France) A Clément	1	**6**	3

Semifinals
(South Africa) W Ferreira	2	1
3	(Spain) **C Moyá**	**6**	**6**
8	(Netherlands) M Verkerk	2	r
7	(Australia) **L Hewitt**	**6**

Final
3	(Spain) Carlos Moyá	3	r
7	(Australia) **Lleyton Hewitt**	**4**
