= 2002 Open 13 – Singles =

Singles
- 2002 Open 13

Final
- Champion: (Sweden) Thomas Enqvist
- Runner-up: (France) Nicolas Escudé
- Score: 6–7^{(4–7)}, 6–3, 6–1

Details
- Draw: 32 (4 Q / 3 WC )
- Seeds: 8

Events
Singles	Doubles
← 2001 ·	Open 13	· 2003 →

Yevgeny Kafelnikov was the defending champion but lost in the semifinals to Thomas Enqvist.

Enqvist won in the final 6–7^{(4–7)}, 6–3, 6–1 against Nicolas Escudé.

== Seeds ==
1. (Spain) Juan Carlos Ferrero (quarterfinals)
2. (Russia) Yevgeny Kafelnikov (semifinals)
3. (France) Sébastien Grosjean (quarterfinals)
4. (Sweden) Thomas Johansson (first round)
5. (United Kingdom) ~~Tim Henman~~ (withdrew)
6. (Switzerland) ~~Roger Federer~~ (withdrew)
7. (Morocco) Younes El Aynaoui (first round, retired because of bronchitis)
8. (Morocco) Hicham Arazi (second round)

== Draw ==
=== Key ===
- Q = Qualifier
- WC = Wild card
- LL = Lucky loser
- Alt = Alternate
- SE = Special exempt
- PR = Protected ranking
- ITF = ITF entry
- JE = Junior exempt
- w/o = Walkover
- r = Retired
- d = Defaulted
- SR = Special ranking

=== Finals ===
Semifinals
(France) Cédric Pioline	3	5
(France) Nicolas Escudé	6	7
(Sweden) Thomas Enqvist	6^{1}	7^{12}	6
2	(Russia) Yevgeny Kafelnikov	7^{7}	6^{10}	4

Final
(France) Nicolas Escudé	7^{7}	3	1
(Sweden) Thomas Enqvist	6^{4}	6	6

=== Top half ===
First round
1	(Spain) J C Ferrero	6	7
(Switzerland) M Kratochvil	3	5
(Croatia) I Ljubičić	6	5	6^{5}
(Russia) A Stoliarov	3	7	7^{7}
(Czech Republic) J Vacek	6^{1}	6	1
(France) J Boutter	7^{7}	1	6
(France) C Pioline	6	2
7	(Morocco) Y El Aynaoui	4	1^{r}
4	(Sweden) T Johansson	4	6	3
(United Kingdom) G Rusedski	6	3	6
(France) F Santoro	6	3	7^{13}
(Armenia) S Sargsian	1	6	6^{11}
(France) N Escudé	6	6
(Russia) N Davydenko	2	3
WC	(France) N Mahut	4	3
LL	(France) M Gicquel	6	6

Second round
1	(Spain) J C Ferrero	6	5	6
(Russia) A Stoliarov	0	7	3
(France) J Boutter	6^{6}	2
(France) C Pioline	7^{8}	6
(United Kingdom) G Rusedski	6	5	6
(France) F Santoro	3	7	4
(France) N Escudé	6	7^{7}
LL	(France) M Gicquel	1	6^{3}

Quarterfinals
1	(Spain) J C Ferrero	7^{7}	4	5
(France) C Pioline	6^{3}	6	7
(United Kingdom) G Rusedski	3	5
(France) N Escudé	6	7

Semifinals
(France) C Pioline	3	5
(France) N Escudé	6	7

=== Bottom half ===
First round
Q	(France) G Carraz	6	6
Q	(Italy) R Furlan	3	3
(Spain) F Clavet	3	6	2
(Sweden) T Enqvist	6	1	6
WC	(France) P-H Mathieu	4	4
(Spain) T Robredo	6	6
(Israel) N Okun	4	2
3	(France) S Grosjean	6	6
8	(Morocco) H Arazi	7^{7}	6
Q	(France) L Roux	6^{5}	2
LL	(France) T Ascione	6^{7}	6^{1}
WC	(Switzerland) M Rosset	7^{9}	7^{7}
(France) A Clément	6	6
Q	(United States) J Tarango	4	3
(Belarus) M Mirnyi	5	6^{4}
2	(Russia) Y Kafelnikov	7	7^{7}

Second round
Q	(France) G Carraz	6^{3}	7^{8}	6^{5}
(Sweden) T Enqvist	7^{7}	6^{6}	7^{7}
(Spain) T Robredo	3	3
3	(France) S Grosjean	6	6
8	(Morocco) H Arazi	5	2
WC	(Switzerland) M Rosset	7	6
(France) A Clément	3	6	3
2	(Russia) Y Kafelnikov	6	3	6

Quarterfinals
(Sweden) T Enqvist	6	7
3	(France) S Grosjean	3	5
WC	(Switzerland) M Rosset	3	6^{5}
2	(Russia) Y Kafelnikov	6	7^{7}

Semifinals
(Sweden) T Enqvist	6^{1}	7^{12}	6
2	(Russia) Y Kafelnikov	7^{7}	6^{10}	4
