= 2001 Open 13 – Doubles =

Doubles
- 2001 Open 13

Final
- Champions: (France) Julien Boutter (France) Fabrice Santoro
- Runners-up: (Australia) Michael Hill (United States) Jeff Tarango
- Score: 7–6^{(9–7)}, 7–5

Details
- Draw: 16 (2WC/1Q/1LL)
- Seeds: 4

Events
Singles	Doubles
← 2000 ·	Open 13	· 2002 →

Simon Aspelin and Johan Landsberg were the defending champions but did not compete that year.

Julien Boutter and Fabrice Santoro won in the final 7–6^{(9–7)}, 7–5 against Michael Hill and Jeff Tarango.

== Seeds ==
1. (Belarus) Max Mirnyi / (Federal Republic of Yugoslavia) Nenad Zimonjić (semifinals)
2. (United States) Justin Gimelstob / (United States) Scott Humphries (first round)
3. (South Africa) David Adams / (South Africa) Marius Barnard (first round)
4. (Australia) Michael Hill / (United States) Jeff Tarango (final)

== Draw ==
=== Key ===
- Q = Qualifier
- WC = Wild card
- LL = Lucky loser
- Alt = Alternate
- SE = Special exempt
- PR = Protected ranking
- ITF = ITF entry
- JE = Junior exempt
- w/o = Walkover
- r = Retired
- d = Defaulted
- SR = Special ranking

First round
1	(Belarus) M Mirnyi (Federal Republic of Yugoslavia) N Zimonjić	7	6
(France) N Escudé (France) M Llodra	5	1
(Czech Republic) T Cibulec (Czech Republic) L Friedl	6	6
WC	(France) S de Chaunac (France) S Lami	2	1
4	(Australia) M Hill (United States) J Tarango	6	3	6
WC	(France) J Benneteau (France) N Mahut	3	6	3
(Spain) J Balcells (Russia) A Olhovskiy	6	6
Q	(France) L Roux (France) C Saulnier	2	3
(France) A Clément (France) S Grosjean	6	6
(South Africa) C Haggard (South Africa) J Weir-Smith	4	3
(Australia) D Macpherson (South Africa) G Stafford	7	6
3	(South Africa) D Adams (South Africa) M Barnard	5	2
LL	(France) J Cuaz (France) J-R Lisnard	2	3
(France) J Boutter (France) F Santoro	6	6
(United States) B Bryan (United States) M Bryan	7^{7}	6
2	(United States) J Gimelstob (United States) S Humphries	6^{3}	2

Quarterfinals
1	(Belarus) M Mirnyi (Federal Republic of Yugoslavia) N Zimonjić	7	4	6
(Czech Republic) T Cibulec (Czech Republic) L Friedl	5	6	3
4	(Australia) M Hill (United States) J Tarango	7	7
(Spain) J Balcells (Russia) A Olhovskiy	5	5
(France) A Clément (France) S Grosjean	6	6
(Australia) D Macpherson (South Africa) G Stafford	2	2
(France) J Boutter (France) F Santoro	6	7^{8}
(United States) B Bryan (United States) M Bryan	4	6^{6}

Semifinals
1	(Belarus) M Mirnyi (Federal Republic of Yugoslavia) N Zimonjić	6	3	6^{4}
4	(Australia) M Hill (United States) J Tarango	1	6	7^{7}
(France) A Clément (France) S Grosjean	3	5
(France) J Boutter (France) F Santoro	6	7

Final
4	(Australia) M Hill (United States) J Tarango	6^{7}	5
(France) J Boutter (France) F Santoro	7^{9}	7

== Qualifying ==
=== Qualifying seeds ===
1. (France) Julien Cuaz / (France) Jean-René Lisnard (qualifying competition, lucky losers)
2. (France) Lionel Roux / (France) Cyril Saulnier (qualifiers)

=== Qualifiers ===
1. (France) Lionel Roux / (France) Cyril Saulnier

=== Lucky losers ===
1. (France) Julien Cuaz / (France) Jean-René Lisnard

=== Qualifying draw ===
Qualifying competition
1	(France) Julien Cuaz (France) Jean-René Lisnard	6^{5}	6	1
2	(France) Lionel Roux (France) Cyril Saulnier	7^{7}	1	6
