= 2006 Medibank International – Women's doubles =

Women's doubles
- 2006 Medibank International

Final
- Champions: (United States) Corina Morariu (Australia) Rennae Stubbs
- Runners-up: (Spain) Virginia Ruano Pascual (Argentina) Paola Suárez
- Score: 6–3, 5–7, 6–2

Events
Singles	men	women
Doubles	men	women
← 2005 ·	Sydney International	· 2007 →

The women's doubles Tournament at the 2006 Medibank International took place between 9 January and 14 January on the outdoor hard courts of the NSW Tennis Centre in Sydney, Australia. Corina Morariu and Rennae Stubbs won the title, defeating Virginia Ruano Pascual and Paola Suárez in the final.

== Seeds ==
1. (United States) Lisa Raymond / (Australia) Samantha Stosur (semifinals)
2. (Germany) Anna-Lena Grönefeld / (South Africa) Liezel Huber (semifinals)
3. (United States) Corina Morariu / (Australia) Rennae Stubbs (champions)
4. (Spain) Virginia Ruano Pascual / (Argentina) Paola Suárez (final)

== Draw ==
=== Key ===
- Q = Qualifier
- WC = Wild card
- LL = Lucky loser
- Alt = Alternate
- SE = Special exempt
- PR = Protected ranking
- ITF = ITF entry
- JE = Junior exempt
- w/o = Walkover
- r = Retired
- d = Defaulted
- SR = Special ranking

First round
1	(United States) L Raymond (Australia) S Stosur	6	6
Q	(Germany) S Klösel (Slovakia) H Nagyová	6^{1}	1
(Russia) S Kuznetsova (France) A Mauresmo	6	6
WC	(Australia) B Sekulovski (Australia) C Watson	1	1
3	(United States) C Morariu (Australia) R Stubbs	6	6
(Czech Republic) E Birnerová (Czech Republic) G Navrátilová	4	3
(Russia) V Dushevina (China) Z Yan	6	6
LL	(Australia) B Calderwood (Australia) R Lampret	1	0
(Slovenia) T Križan (United States) J Russell	7	6
(Australia) L McShea (Australia) B Stewart	5	1
(China) S Peng (China) T Sun	4	7	3
4	(Spain) V Ruano Pascual (Argentina) P Suárez	6	5	6
(Italy) ME Camerin (Japan) R Fujiwara	6	6
LL	(United States) N Uberoi (Russia) G Voskoboeva	4	3
(Slovakia) D Hantuchová (Japan) A Sugiyama	1	6^{4}
2	(Germany) AL Grönefeld (South Africa) L Huber	6	7

Second round
1	(United States) L Raymond (Australia) S Stosur	6	6
(Russia) S Kuznetsova (France) A Mauresmo	3	4
3	(United States) C Morariu (Australia) R Stubbs	7	2	6
(Russia) V Dushevina (China) Z Yan	5	6	1
(Slovenia) T Križan (United States) J Russell	6	3	4
4	(Spain) V Ruano Pascual (Argentina) P Suárez	4	6	6
(Italy) ME Camerin (Japan) R Fujiwara	1	2
2	(Germany) AL Grönefeld (South Africa) L Huber	6	6

Semifinals
1	(United States) L Raymond (Australia) S Stosur	2	6	4
3	(United States) C Morariu (Australia) R Stubbs	6	2	6
4	(Spain) V Ruano Pascual (Argentina) P Suárez	6	6
2	(Germany) AL Grönefeld (South Africa) L Huber	4	1

Final
3	(United States) C Morariu (Australia) R Stubbs	6	5	6
4	(Spain) V Ruano Pascual (Argentina) P Suárez	3	7	2
