= 2005 Medibank International – Women's singles =

Women's singles
- 2005 Medibank International

Final
- Champion: (Australia) Alicia Molik
- Runner-up: (Australia) Samantha Stosur
- Score: 6–7^{(5–7)}, 6–4, 7–5

Details
- Draw: 28
- Seeds: 8

Events
Singles	men	women
Doubles	men	women
- Sydney International

Justine Henin-Hardenne was the defending champion, but did not compete this year.

Alicia Molik won the title by defeating Samantha Stosur 6–7^{(5–7)}, 6–4, 7–5 in the final. It was the first title for Molik in this season and the fifth title in her career.

== Seeds ==
The first four seeds received a bye into the second round.

1. (United States) Lindsay Davenport (quarterfinals, withdrew due to a bronchitis)
2. (Russia) Anastasia Myskina (second round)
3. (Russia) Elena Dementieva (semifinals, withdrew due to a heat illness)
4. (Russia) Vera Zvonareva (second round)
5. (Russia) Nadia Petrova (quarterfinals)
6. (Australia) Alicia Molik (champion)
7. (Switzerland) Patty Schnyder (quarterfinals)
8. (Japan) Ai Sugiyama (first round)

== Draw ==
Key

- Q = Qualifier
- WC = Wild card
- LL = Lucky loser
- Alt = Alternate
- ITF = ITF entry
- PR = Protected ranking
- SR = Special ranking
- SE = Special exempt
- JE = Junior exempt
- JR = Junior Accelerator Programme entrant
- CO = College Accelerator Programme entrant
- NG = Next Gen Accelerator Program entrant
- w/o = Walkover
- r = Retired
- d = Defaulted

=== Finals ===
Semifinals
WC	(Australia) Samantha Stosur	w/o
3	(Russia) Elena Dementieva
6	(Australia) Alicia Molik	6	6
Q	(China) Shuai Peng	4	3

Final
WC	(Australia) Samantha Stosur	7^{7}	4	5
6	(Australia) Alicia Molik	6^{5}	6	7

=== Top half ===
First round
(France) N Dechy	7	6
(United States) L Raymond	5	3
(Croatia) J Kostanić	3	3
WC	(Australia) S Stosur	6	6
(France) T Golovin	6	2	6
8	(Japan) A Sugiyama	1	6	3
(Greece) E Daniilidou	3	6	6
WC	(Spain) C Martínez	6	4	4
WC	(Australia) S Ferguson	7^{7}	2	2
(Bulgaria) M Maleeva	6^{3}	6	6
(Croatia) K Šprem	7	2	3
7	(Switzerland) P Schnyder	5	6	6

Second round
1	(United States) L Davenport	6	6
(France) N Dechy	3	4
WC	(Australia) S Stosur	6	4	6
(France) T Golovin	2	6	2
3	(Russia) E Dementieva	6	3	6
(Greece) E Daniilidou	3	6	2
(Bulgaria) M Maleeva	4	2
7	(Switzerland) P Schnyder	6	6

Quarterfinals
1	(United States) L Davenport
WC	(Australia) S Stosur	w/o
3	(Russia) E Dementieva	6	1	6
7	(Switzerland) P Schnyder	4	6	1

Semifinals
WC	(Australia) S Stosur	w/o
3	(Russia) E Dementieva

=== Bottom half ===
First round
6	(Australia) A Molik	7^{7}	6
(Italy) F Schiavone	6^{4}	1
(Serbia and Montenegro) J Janković	4	6	6
(Russia) E Likhovtseva	6	2	4
LL	(Czech Republic) D Chládková	2	4
(Colombia) F Zuluaga	6	6
5	(Russia) N Petrova	4	6	6
Q	(Slovakia) Ľ Cervanová	6	1	2
(Slovakia) D Hantuchová	7^{7}	6
Q	(Croatia) S Talaja	6^{2}	2
Q	(United States) M Washington	4	2
Q	(China) S Peng	6	6

Second round
6	(Australia) A Molik	6	6
(Serbia and Montenegro) J Janković	3	4
(Colombia) F Zuluaga	7^{9}	6
4	(Russia) V Zvonareva	6^{7}	3
5	(Russia) N Petrova	6	6
(Slovakia) D Hantuchová	0	2
Q	(China) S Peng	6	6
2	(Russia) A Myskina	1	3

Quarterfinals
6	(Australia) A Molik	6	6
(Colombia) F Zuluaga	1	2
5	(Russia) N Petrova	3	2^{r}
Q	(China) S Peng	6	4

Semifinals
6	(Australia) A Molik	6	6
Q	(China) S Peng	4	3
