= 2003 Adidas International – Women's doubles =

Women's doubles
- 2003 Adidas International

Final
- Champions: (Belgium) Kim Clijsters (Japan) Ai Sugiyama
- Runners-up: (Spain) Conchita Martínez (Australia) Rennae Stubbs
- Score: 6–3, 6–3

Events
Singles	men	women
Doubles	men	women
← 2002 ·	Sydney International	· 2004 →

Lisa Raymond and Rennae Stubbs were the defending champions, but competed this year with different partners. Raymond teamed up with Lindsay Davenport and lost in the first round to Anna Kournikova and Chanda Rubin, while Stubbs teamed up with Conchita Martínez and lost in the final to tournament winners Kim Clijsters and Ai Sugiyama, 6–3, 6–3.

It was the 5th title for Clijsters and the 21st title for Sugiyama in their respective doubles careers.

== Seeds ==
1. (Russia) Elena Dementieva / (Slovakia) Janette Husárová (semifinals)
2. (Spain) Conchita Martínez / (Australia) Rennae Stubbs (final)
3. (Belgium) Kim Clijsters / (Japan) Ai Sugiyama (champions)
4. (Russia) Anna Kournikova / (United States) Chanda Rubin (quarterfinals)

== Draw ==
=== Key ===
- Q = Qualifier
- WC = Wild card
- LL = Lucky loser
- Alt = Alternate
- SE = Special exempt
- PR = Protected ranking
- ITF = ITF entry
- JE = Junior exempt
- w/o = Walkover
- r = Retired
- d = Defaulted
- SR = Special ranking

=== Draw ===
First round
1	(Russia) E Dementieva (Slovakia) J Husárová	6	6^{5}	6
(Belgium) J Henin-Hardenne (Australia) N Pratt	4	7^{7}	3
(Italy) S Farina Elia (Slovakia) D Hantuchová	1	5
(Russia) T Panova (United States) S Reeves	6	7
3	(Belgium) K Clijsters (Japan) A Sugiyama	6	6
LL	(Slovakia) Ľ Cervanová (Slovakia) Ľ Kurhajcová	4	3
WC	(Switzerland) M Casanova (Australia) E Dominikovic	6	6
(United States) M Navratilova (United States) A Stevenson	3	2
(Estonia) M Ani (Romania) A Vanc	6	r
(South Africa) A Coetzer (South Africa) J Steck	6
PR	(United States) L Davenport (United States) L Raymond	4	6	3
4	(Russia) A Kournikova (United States) C Rubin	6	4	6
(United States) M Irvin (Argentina) P Tarabini	6^{6}	6	7^{7}
(Australia) T Musgrave (Thailand) T Tanasugarn	7^{8}	4	6^{5}
Q	(Canada) M Drake (Czech Republic) L Průšová	4	3
2	(Spain) C Martínez (Australia) R Stubbs	6	6

Quarterfinals
1	(Russia) E Dementieva (Slovakia) J Husárová	6	6
(Russia) T Panova (United States) S Reeves	2	2
3	(Belgium) K Clijsters (Japan) A Sugiyama	6^{5}	7^{7}	7^{8}
WC	(Switzerland) M Casanova (Australia) E Dominikovic	7^{7}	6^{5}	6^{6}
(South Africa) A Coetzer (South Africa) J Steck	6	6
4	(Russia) A Kournikova (United States) C Rubin	3	2
(United States) M Irvin (Argentina) P Tarabini	5	4
2	(Spain) C Martínez (Australia) R Stubbs	7	6

Semifinals
1	(Russia) E Dementieva (Slovakia) J Husárová	6	2	1
3	(Belgium) K Clijsters (Japan) A Sugiyama	4	6	6
(South Africa) A Coetzer (South Africa) J Steck	2	3
2	(Spain) C Martínez (Australia) R Stubbs	6	6

Final
3	(Belgium) K Clijsters (Japan) A Sugiyama	6	6
2	(Spain) C Martínez (Australia) R Stubbs	3	3
