= 2006 Medibank International – Women's singles =

Women's singles
- 2006 Medibank International

Final
- Champion: (Belgium) Justine Henin-Hardenne
- Runner-up: (Italy) Francesca Schiavone
- Score: 4–6, 7–5, 7–5

Details
- Draw: 28
- Seeds: 8

Events
Singles	men	women
Doubles	men	women
- Sydney International

Alicia Molik was the defending champion, but was unable to compete due to vestibular neuronitis.

Justine Henin-Hardenne won the title, defeating Francesca Schiavone 4–6, 7–5, 7–5 in the final.

== Singles results ==
=== Seeds ===
- The top four seeds receive a bye into the second round
1. (Belgium) Kim Clijsters (quarterfinals, withdrew due to a hip injury)
2. (France) Amélie Mauresmo (second round)
3. (Switzerland) Patty Schnyder (second round)
4. (Russia) Nadia Petrova (quarterfinals, withdrew due to an ankle strain)
5. (Belgium) Justine Henin-Hardenne (champion)
6. (Russia) Svetlana Kuznetsova (semifinals)
7. (Italy) Francesca Schiavone (final)
8. (Czech Republic) Nicole Vaidišová (semifinals)

Key

- Q = Qualifier
- WC = Wild card
- LL = Lucky loser
- Alt = Alternate
- ITF = ITF entry
- PR = Protected ranking
- SR = Special ranking
- SE = Special exempt
- JE = Junior exempt
- JR = Junior Accelerator Programme entrant
- CO = College Accelerator Programme entrant
- NG = Next Gen Accelerator Program entrant
- w/o = Walkover
- r = Retired
- d = Defaulted

=== Finals ===
Semifinals
7	(Italy) Francesca Schiavone	6	6
8	(Czech Republic) Nicole Vaidišová	4	3
5	(Belgium) Justine Henin-Hardenne	6	6
6	(Russia) Svetlana Kuznetsova	3	1

Final
7	(Italy) Francesca Schiavone	6	5	5
5	(Belgium) Justine Henin-Hardenne	4	7	7

=== Top half ===
First round
Q	(China) N Li	6	6
(Italy) F Pennetta	4	1
Q	(China) Z Yan	6	6
(Russia) A Chakvetadze	3	3
(Japan) A Sugiyama	1	2
7	(Italy) F Schiavone	6	6
(Slovakia) D Hantuchová	6	2	6
(India) S Mirza	4	6	2
(Russia) E Likhovtseva	4	6	3
Q	(Ukraine) Y Fedak	6	3	6
WC	(Australia) S Stosur	4	6	1
8	(Czech Republic) N Vaidišová	6	4	6

Second round
1	(Belgium) K Clijsters	6	6
Q	(China) N Li	3	1
Q	(China) Z Yan	6	6^{5}	1
7	(Italy) F Schiavone	3	7^{7}	6
3	(Switzerland) P Schnyder	6	3	4
(Slovakia) D Hantuchová	3	6	6
Q	(Ukraine) Y Fedak	3	3
8	(Czech Republic) N Vaidišová	6	6

Quarter-Finals
1	(Belgium) K Clijsters
7	(Italy) F Schiavone	w/o
(Slovakia) D Hantuchová	3	1^{r}
8	(Czech Republic) N Vaidišová	6	3

Semi-Finals
7	(Italy) F Schiavone	6	6
8	(Czech Republic) N Vaidišová	4	3

=== Bottom half ===
First round
5	(Belgium) J Henin-Hardenne	6	6
WC	(Switzerland) M Hingis	3	3
Q	(Russia) V Dushevina	6	3	6
WC	(Russia) V Zvonareva	4	6	1
(Argentina) G Dulko	4	0^{r}
(Russia) M Kirilenko	6	3
6	(Russia) S Kuznetsova	6	5	7
(Japan) S Asagoe	1	7	5
(Germany) A-L Grönefeld	2	1
(Russia) D Safina	6	6
(China) S Peng	2	4
(Serbia and Montenegro) A Ivanovic	6	6

Second round
5	(Belgium) J Henin-Hardenne	6	6
Q	(Russia) V Dushevina	2	2
(Russia) M Kirilenko	1	2
4	(Russia) N Petrova	6	6
6	(Russia) S Kuznetsova	6
(Russia) D Safina	3	r
(Serbia and Montenegro) A Ivanovic	6	7
2	(France) A Mauresmo	3	5

Quarter-Finals
5	(Belgium) J Henin-Hardenne	w/o
4	(Russia) N Petrova
6	(Russia) S Kuznetsova	7^{7}	6
(Serbia and Montenegro) A Ivanovic	6^{3}	3

Semi-Finals
5	(Belgium) J Henin-Hardenne	6	6
6	(Russia) S Kuznetsova	3	1
