= 2005 Medibank International – Men's singles =

Men's singles
- 2005 Medibank International

Final
- Champion: (Australia) Lleyton Hewitt
- Runner-up: (Czech Republic) Ivo Minář
- Score: 7–5, 6–0

Details
- Draw: 32
- Seeds: 8

Events
Singles	men	women
Doubles	men	women
← 2004 ·	Sydney International	· 2006 →

Lleyton Hewitt was the defending champion.

Hewitt successfully defended his title, defeating Ivo Minář 7–5, 6–0 in the final.

== Seeds ==
1. (Australia) Lleyton Hewitt (champion)
2. (Spain) Carlos Moyá (first round)
3. (Sweden) Joachim Johansson (second round, retired because of a right hamstring injury)
4. (Romania) Andrei Pavel (quarterfinals)
5. (Spain) Feliciano López (quarterfinals)
6. (Russia) Nikolay Davydenko (first round)
7. (Sweden) Thomas Johansson (quarterfinals)
8. (United States) Taylor Dent (quarterfinals, retired because of viral gastroenteritis)

== Draw ==
=== Key ===
- Q = Qualifier
- WC = Wild card
- LL = Lucky loser
- Alt = Alternate
- SE = Special exempt
- PR = Protected ranking
- ITF = ITF entry
- JE = Junior exempt
- w/o = Walkover
- r = Retired
- d = Defaulted
- SR = Special ranking

=== Finals ===
Semifinals
1	(Australia) Lleyton Hewitt	6^{4}	6	6
(Belarus) Max Mirnyi	7^{7}	3	2
Q	(Czech Republic) Ivo Minář	6	6
(Czech Republic) Radek Štěpánek	1	2

Final
1	(Australia) Lleyton Hewitt	7	6
Q	(Czech Republic) Ivo Minář	5	0

=== Top half ===
First round
1	(Australia) L Hewitt	6	6
(Slovakia) K Beck	1	2
Q	(France) A Clément	6	6
SE	(Czech Republic) T Zíb	1	3
WC	(Australia) W Arthurs	7^{7}	6^{4}	6
(Italy) F Volandri	6^{1}	7^{7}	3
(Germany) F Mayer	2	6^{5}
7	(Sweden) T Johansson	6	7^{7}
3	(Sweden) J Johansson	6	6
(United Kingdom) G Rusedski	4	3
(Belarus) M Mirnyi	6	7
(Spain) D Ferrer	1	5
(Sweden) R Söderling	4	4
(United States) M Fish	6	6
Q	(Spain) S Ventura	5	6^{7}
8	(United States) T Dent	7	7^{9}

Second round
1	(Australia) L Hewitt	6	6
Q	(France) A Clément	2	4
WC	(Australia) W Arthurs	6^{4}	6^{3}
7	(Sweden) T Johansson	7^{7}	7^{7}
3	(Sweden) J Johansson	1^{r}
(Belarus) M Mirnyi	4
(United States) M Fish	6^{4}	1
8	(United States) T Dent	7^{7}	6

Quarterfinals
1	(Australia) L Hewitt	6	7^{7}
7	(Sweden) T Johansson	1	6^{4}
(Belarus) M Mirnyi	3
8	(United States) T Dent	4^{r}

Semifinals
1	(Australia) L Hewitt	6^{4}	6	6
(Belarus) M Mirnyi	7^{7}	3	2

=== Bottom half ===
First round
6	(Russia) N Davydenko	2	6	2
Q	(Czech Republic) I Minář	6	3	6
(Spain) F Verdasco	3	6	7
(Czech Republic) T Berdych	6	4	5
(Austria) J Melzer	3	5
LL	(Finland) J Nieminen	6	7
Q	(Australia) L Bourgeois	6^{3}	5
4	(Romania) A Pavel	7^{7}	6
5	(Spain) F López	6	6
WC	(Australia) T Reid	4	4
(Belgium) X Malisse	6	0	3
(France) M Llodra	4	6	6
(Spain) A Costa	1	4
(Russia) I Andreev	6	6
(Czech Republic) R Štěpánek	2	6	6
2	(Spain) C Moyà	6	4	2

Second round
Q	(Czech Republic) I Minář	6	6
(Spain) F Verdasco	1	2
LL	(Finland) J Nieminen	4	6^{3}
4	(Romania) A Pavel	6	7^{7}
5	(Spain) F López	6	3	7^{7}
(France) M Llodra	4	6	6^{4}
(Russia) I Andreev	3	7^{7}	2
(Czech Republic) R Štěpánek	6	6^{5}	6

Quarterfinals
Q	(Czech Republic) I Minář	2	7^{7}	6
4	(Romania) A Pavel	6	6^{5}	4
5	(Spain) F López	3	2
(Czech Republic) R Štěpánek	6	6

Semifinals
Q	(Czech Republic) I Minář	6	6
(Czech Republic) R Štěpánek	1	2
