= 2003 Adidas International – Women's singles =

Women's singles
- 2003 Adidas International

Final
- Champion: (Belgium) Kim Clijsters
- Runner-up: (United States) Lindsay Davenport
- Score: 6–4, 6–3

Details
- Draw: 28
- Seeds: 8

Events
Singles	men	women
Doubles	men	women
- Sydney International

Martina Hingis was the defending champion, but did not compete this year. Hingis would retire from professional tennis one month later.

Kim Clijsters won the title by defeating Lindsay Davenport 6–4, 6–3 in the final. It was the first title in the season for Clijsters and the 11th title in her career.

== Seeds ==
The first four seeds received a bye into the second round.

1. (United States) Jennifer Capriati (second round)
2. (Belgium) Kim Clijsters (champion)
3. (Belgium) Justine Henin-Hardenne (semifinals)
4. (Slovakia) Daniela Hantuchová (quarterfinals)
5. (Russia) Anastasia Myskina (first round)
6. (United States) Lindsay Davenport (final)
7. (United States) Chanda Rubin (quarterfinals)
8. (Bulgaria) Magdalena Maleeva (second round)

== Draw ==
Key

- Q = Qualifier
- WC = Wild card
- LL = Lucky loser
- Alt = Alternate
- ITF = ITF entry
- PR = Protected ranking
- SR = Special ranking
- SE = Special exempt
- JE = Junior exempt
- JR = Junior Accelerator Programme entrant
- CO = College Accelerator Programme entrant
- NG = Next Gen Accelerator Program entrant
- w/o = Walkover
- r = Retired
- d = Defaulted

=== Finals ===
Semifinals
(Russia) Tatiana Panova	3	5
6	(United States) Lindsay Davenport	6	7
3	(Belgium) Justine Henin-Hardenne	2	3
2	(Belgium) Kim Clijsters	6	6

Final
6	(United States) Lindsay Davenport	4	3
2	(Belgium) Kim Clijsters	6	6

=== Top half ===
First round
(Russia) T Panova	3	7^{7}	6
WC	(Australia) E Dominikovic	6	6^{2}	2
Q	(Belarus) O Barabanschikova	2	6	6
(Spain) C Martínez	6	2	4
(Russia) E Bovina	6	7
5	(Russia) A Myskina	3	5
Q	(Czech Republic) K Koukalová	2	6	2
WC	(Thailand) T Tanasugarn	6	3	6
Q	(United States) L Raymond	6	4	6
(Greece) E Daniilidou	4	6	3
WC	(Australia) N Pratt	3	3
6	(United States) L Davenport	6	6

Second round
1	(United States) J Capriati	6	4	5
(Russia) T Panova	4	6	7
Q	(Belarus) O Barabanschikova	7^{7}	6
(Russia) E Bovina	6^{1}	2
4	(Slovakia) D Hantuchová	7^{7}	6
WC	(Thailand) T Tanasugarn	6^{2}	1
Q	(United States) L Raymond	4	1
6	(United States) L Davenport	6	6

Quarterfinals
(Russia) T Panova	6	6
Q	(Belarus) O Barabanschikova	3	2
4	(Slovakia) D Hantuchová	4	6	6^{3}
6	(United States) L Davenport	6	3	7^{7}

Semifinals
(Russia) T Panova	3	5
6	(United States) L Davenport	6	7

=== Bottom half ===
First round
8	(Bulgaria) M Maleeva	3	7	6
(Italy) S Farina Elia	6	5	0
(South Africa) A Coetzer	6	3	6
(Japan) A Sugiyama	2	6	3
Q	(Slovakia) J Husárová	6	2	6
(Russia) A Kournikova	4	6	1
7	(United States) C Rubin	6	7
(Russia) E Dementieva	3	5
(United States) A Stevenson	7^{7}	6
LL	(Slovakia) Ľ Kurhajcová	6^{5}	4
(Argentina) P Suárez	6	3	4
(Switzerland) P Schnyder	2	6	6

Second round
8	(Bulgaria) M Maleeva	4	1
(South Africa) A Coetzer	6	6
Q	(Slovakia) J Husárová	1	0
3	(Belgium) J Henin-Hardenne	6	6
7	(United States) C Rubin	6	6
(United States) A Stevenson	1	3
(Switzerland) P Schnyder	1	3
2	(Belgium) K Clijsters	6	6

Quarterfinals
(South Africa) A Coetzer	4	4
3	(Belgium) J Henin-Hardenne	6	6
7	(United States) C Rubin	1	2
2	(Belgium) K Clijsters	6	6

Semifinals
3	(Belgium) J Henin-Hardenne	2	3
2	(Belgium) K Clijsters	6	6
