= 2005 Medibank International =

- Date: 9–15 January
- Edition: 113th
- Surface: Hard / Outdoor
- Location: Sydney, Australia
- Venue: NSW Tennis Centre

Champions

Men's singles
- (Australia) Lleyton Hewitt

Women's singles
- (Australia) Alicia Molik

Men's doubles
- (India) Mahesh Bhupathi / (Australia) Todd Woodbridge

Women's doubles
- (Australia) Bryanne Stewart / (Australia) Samantha Stosur
- Medibank International

The 2005 Medibank International was a tennis tournament played on outdoor hard courts. It was the 113th edition of the Medibank International, and part of the ATP World Tour 250 series of the 2005 ATP Tour, and of the WTA Premier tournaments of the 2005 WTA Tour. It was the 113th edition of the tournament and both the men's and the women's events took place at the NSW Tennis Centre in Sydney, Australia, from 9 to 15 January 2005.

== Finals ==
=== Men's singles ===
(Australia) Lleyton Hewitt defeated (Czech Republic) Ivo Minář, 7–5, 6–0

=== Women's singles ===
(Australia) Alicia Molik defeated (Australia) Samantha Stosur, 6–7, 6–4, 7–5

=== Men's doubles ===
(India) Mahesh Bhupathi / (Australia) Todd Woodbridge defeated (France) Arnaud Clément / (France) Michaël Llodra, 6–3, 6–3

=== Women's doubles ===
(Australia) Bryanne Stewart / (Australia) Samantha Stosur defeated (Russia) Elena Dementieva / (Japan) Ai Sugiyama, walkover
