= 2003 ABN AMRO World Tennis Tournament – Doubles =

Doubles
- 2003 ABN AMRO World Tennis Tournament

Final
- Champions: (Australia) Wayne Arthurs (Australia) Paul Hanley
- Runners-up: (Switzerland) Roger Federer (Belarus) Max Mirnyi
- Score: 7–6^{(7–4)}, 6–2

Details
- Draw: 16
- Seeds: 4

Events
Singles	Doubles
- ABN AMRO World Tennis Tournament

Roger Federer and Max Mirnyi were the defending champions but lost in the final 7–6^{(7–4)}, 6–2 against Wayne Arthurs and Paul Hanley.

== Seeds ==
Champion seeds are indicated in bold text while text in italics indicates the round in which those seeds were eliminated.

1. (Sweden) Jonas Björkman / (Australia) Todd Woodbridge (semifinals)
2. (Czech Republic) Martin Damm / (Czech Republic) Cyril Suk (semifinals)
3. (United States) Donald Johnson / (United States) Jared Palmer (first round)
4. (Zimbabwe) Wayne Black / (Zimbabwe) Kevin Ullyett (first round)

== Draw ==
Key

- Q = Qualifier
- WC = Wild card
- LL = Lucky loser
- Alt = Alternate
- ITF = ITF entry
- PR = Protected ranking
- SR = Special ranking
- SE = Special exempt
- JE = Junior exempt
- JR = Junior Accelerator Programme entrant
- CO = College Accelerator Programme entrant
- NG = Next Gen Accelerator Program entrant
- w/o = Walkover
- r = Retired
- d = Defaulted

First round
1	(Sweden) **J Björkman** (Australia) **T Woodbridge**	**7^{7}**	**7**
(India) L Paes (Czech Republic) D Rikl	6^{4}	5
(Slovakia) **D Hrbatý** (Russia) **Y Kafelnikov**	**6**	**6**
(Spain) J C Ferrero (Spain) T Robredo	4	3
3	(United States) D Johnson (United States) J Palmer	3	4
(France) **S Grosjean** (Serbia and Montenegro) **N Zimonjić**	**6**	**6**
(Australia) **W Arthurs** (Australia) **P Hanley**	**6**	4	**6**
(Belgium) X Malisse (Belgium) T Vanhoudt	0	**6**	4
WC	(Croatia) M Ančić (Netherlands) F Hemmes Jr.	6^{8}	**6**	2
(Spain) **À Corretja** (Spain) **A Costa**	**7^{10}**	4	**6**
(Switzerland) **R Federer** (Belarus) **M Mirnyi**	**6**	**7**
4	(Zimbabwe) W Black (Zimbabwe) K Ullyett	3	5
(Czech Republic) **T Cibulec** (Czech Republic) **P Vízner**	**7^{7}**	6^{5}	**6**
WC	(Netherlands) R Sluiter (Netherlands) M Verkerk	6^{5}	**7^{7}**	3
(Czech Republic) P Pála (Netherlands) S Schalken	4	3
2	(Czech Republic) **M Damm** (Czech Republic) **C Suk**	**6**	**6**

Quarterfinals
1	(Sweden) **J Björkman** (Australia) **T Woodbridge**	**6**	**6**
(Slovakia) D Hrbatý (Russia) Y Kafelnikov	3	4
(France) S Grosjean (Serbia and Montenegro) N Zimonjić	6^{2}	4
(Australia) **W Arthurs** (Australia) **P Hanley**	**7^{7}**	**6**
(Spain) À Corretja (Spain) A Costa	4	**6**	5
(Switzerland) **R Federer** (Belarus) **M Mirnyi**	**6**	3	**7**
(Czech Republic) T Cibulec (Czech Republic) P Vízner	**6**	4	4
2	(Czech Republic) **M Damm** (Czech Republic) **C Suk**	4	**6**	**6**

Semifinals
1	(Sweden) J Björkman (Australia) T Woodbridge	6^{5}	5
(Australia) **W Arthurs** (Australia) **P Hanley**	**7^{7}**	**7**
(Switzerland) **R Federer** (Belarus) **M Mirnyi**	**6**	3	**7^{9}**
2	(Czech Republic) M Damm (Czech Republic) C Suk	4	**6**	6^{7}

Final
(Australia) **W Arthurs** (Australia) **P Hanley**	**7^{7}**	**6**
(Switzerland) R Federer (Belarus) M Mirnyi	6^{4}	2
