= 2002 Open 13 =

- Date: 11–17 February
- Edition: 10th
- Category: International Series
- Draw: 32S/ 16D
- Prize money: $451,000
- Surface: Hard / indoor
- Location: Marseille, France
- Venue: Palais des Sports de Marseille

Champions

Singles
- (Sweden) Thomas Enqvist

Doubles
- (France) Arnaud Clément / (France) Nicolas Escudé
- Open 13

The 2002 Open 13 was a men's ATP tennis tournament played on indoor hard courts at the Palais des Sports de Marseille in Marseille in France and was part of the International Series of the 2002 ATP Tour. It was the tenth edition of the tournament and was held from 11 February until 17 February 2002. Unseeded Thomas Enqvist won the singles title.

== Finals ==
=== Singles ===
(Sweden) Thomas Enqvist defeated (France) Nicolas Escudé 6–7^{(4–7)}, 6–3, 6–1

- It was Enqvist's only singles title of the year and the 19th and last of his career.

=== Doubles ===
(France) Arnaud Clément / (France) Nicolas Escudé defeated (France) Julien Boutter / (Belarus) Max Mirnyi 6–4, 6–3

- It was Clément's only title of the year and the 3rd of his career. It was Escude's 1st title of the year and the 3rd of his career.
