= 2006 Medibank International – Men's doubles =

Men's doubles
- 2006 Medibank International

Final
- Champions: (France) Fabrice Santoro (Serbia and Montenegro) Nenad Zimonjić
- Runners-up: (Czech Republic) František Čermák (Czech Republic) Leoš Friedl
- Score: 6–1, 6–4

Events
Singles	men	women
Doubles	men	women
- Sydney International

Mahesh Bhupathi and Todd Woodbridge were the defending champions, but did not participate this year.

Fabrice Santoro and Nenad Zimonjić won the title, defeating František Čermák and Leoš Friedl 6–1, 6–4 in the final.

== Seeds ==
1. (United States) Bob Bryan / (United States) Mike Bryan (semifinals)
2. (The Bahamas) Mark Knowles / (Canada) Daniel Nestor (first round)
3. (Australia) Paul Hanley / (Zimbabwe) Kevin Ullyett (quarterfinals)
4. (France) Fabrice Santoro / (Serbia and Montenegro) Nenad Zimonjić (champions)

== Draw ==
Key

- Q = Qualifier
- WC = Wild card
- LL = Lucky loser
- Alt = Alternate
- ITF = ITF entry
- PR = Protected ranking
- SR = Special ranking
- SE = Special exempt
- JE = Junior exempt
- JR = Junior Accelerator Programme entrant
- CO = College Accelerator Programme entrant
- NG = Next Gen Accelerator Program entrant
- w/o = Walkover
- r = Retired
- d = Defaulted

=== Draw ===
First round
1	(United States) B Bryan (United States) M Bryan	6	4	[12]
WC	(Australia) C Guccione (Australia) N Healey	2	6	[10]
(Czech Republic) M Damm (India) L Paes	6	6
(Argentina) A Calleri (Spain) T Robredo	1	4
4	(France) F Santoro (Serbia and Montenegro) N Zimonjić	6	6
(Russia) I Andreev (Russia) D Tursunov	2	0
(Israel) J Erlich (Israel) A Ram	6^{4}	6^{5}
(France) A Clément (France) M Llodra	7^{7}	7^{7}
(Austria) J Knowle (Austria) J Melzer	7	6
(Czech Republic) T Berdych (Czech Republic) C Suk	5	3
(Australia) S Huss (United States) J Thomas	4	0
3	(Australia) P Hanley (Zimbabwe) K Ullyett	6	6
WC	(Australia) M Kimmich (Australia) P Luczak	4	4
(Czech Republic) F Čermák (Czech Republic) L Friedl	6	6
(Poland) M Fyrstenberg (Poland) M Matkowski	2	6	[13]
2	(The Bahamas) M Knowles (Canada) D Nestor	6	3	[11]

Quarterfinals
1	(United States) B Bryan (United States) M Bryan	6	6
(Czech Republic) M Damm (India) L Paes	4	4
4	(France) F Santoro (Serbia and Montenegro) N Zimonjić	6	6
(France) A Clément (France) M Llodra	0	4
(Austria) J Knowle (Austria) J Melzer	4	7	[13]
3	(Australia) P Hanley (Zimbabwe) K Ullyett	6	5	[11]
(Czech Republic) F Čermák (Czech Republic) L Friedl	6	6
(Poland) M Fyrstenberg (Poland) M Matkowski	3	2

Semifinals
1	(United States) B Bryan (United States) M Bryan	4	3
4	(France) F Santoro (Serbia and Montenegro) N Zimonjić	6	6
(Austria) J Knowle (Austria) J Melzer	3	3
(Czech Republic) F Čermák (Czech Republic) L Friedl	6	6

Final
4	(France) F Santoro (Serbia and Montenegro) N Zimonjić	6	6
(Czech Republic) F Čermák (Czech Republic) L Friedl	1	4
