= 2003 Adidas International – Men's singles =

Men's singles
- 2003 Adidas International

Final
- Champion: (South Korea) Lee Hyung-taik
- Runner-up: (Spain) Juan Carlos Ferrero
- Score: 4–6, 7–6^{(8–6)}, 7–6^{(7–4)}

Details
- Draw: 32
- Seeds: 8

Events
| Singles | men | women |
| Doubles | men | women |
| ← 2002 · | Sydney International | · 2004 → |

Lee Hyung-taik won his first (and only) ATP Tour title, defeating Juan Carlos Ferrero in the final, 4–6, 7–6^{(8–6)}, 7–6^{(7–4)}. He saved a championship point in the third set and became the first South Korean player to win an ATP title.

Roger Federer was the defending champion, but lost in the first round to lucky loser Franco Squillari.

== Seeds ==
A champion seed is indicated in bold text while text in italics indicates the round in which that seed was eliminated.

1. (Russia) Marat Safin (quarterfinals)
2. (Spain) Juan Carlos Ferrero (final)
3. (Spain) Carlos Moyá (second round)
4. (Switzerland) Roger Federer (first round)
5. (Spain) Albert Costa (first round)
6. (United States) Andy Roddick (second round)
7. (Thailand) Paradorn Srichaphan (quarterfinals)
8. (Argentina) Gastón Gaudio (second round)

== Draw ==
=== Key ===
- Q = Qualifier
- WC = Wild card
- LL = Lucky loser
- Alt = Alternate
- SE = Special exempt
- PR = Protected ranking
- ITF = ITF entry
- JE = Junior exempt
- w/o = Walkover
- r = Retired
- d = Defaulted
- SR = Special ranking

First round
1 | (Russia) **M Safin** | **6** | **6**
(Belgium) O Rochus | 1 | 4
Q | (Australia) P Luczak | 0 | **6** | 5
(Finland) **J Nieminen** | **6** | 3 | **7**
Q | (South Korea) **H-T Lee** | **6** | **6**
(Ecuador) N Lapentti | 2 | 0
(Spain) T Robredo | 2 | 2
6 | (United States) **A Roddick** | **6** | **6**
4 | (Switzerland) R Federer | 2 | 3
LL | (Argentina) **F Squillari** | **6** | **6**
SE | (Russia) **N Davydenko** | **6** | **6**
WC | (Australia) R Durek | 3 | 4
(Sweden) T Enqvist | 2 | 4
(South Africa) **W Ferreira** | **6** | **6**
(Argentina) **J I Chela** | **7^{7}** | **6**
5 | (Spain) A Costa | 6^{4} | 1
8 | (Argentina) **G Gaudio** | 6^{5} | **6** | **7**
WC | (Australia) T Reid | **7^{7}** | 2 | 5
(Croatia) I Ljubičić | 2 | 6^{1}
(Germany) **R Schüttler** | **6** | **7^{7}**
(Netherlands) R Krajicek | 6^{0} | 4
Q | (United States) **M Fish** | **7^{7}** | **6**
(United States) J Blake | 3 | **7^{8}** | 3
3 | (Spain) **C Moyá** | **6** | 6^{6} | **6**
7 | (Thailand) **P Srichaphan** | **6** | 3 | **6**
WC | (Australia) S Draper | 4 | **6** | 1
(Belarus) **M Mirnyi** | **7^{7}** | 6^{5} | **6**
(Belgium) X Malisse | 6^{5} | **7^{7}** | 3
(Russia) **M Youzhny** | 3 | **2**
SE | (Romania) A Voinea | **6** | 1 | r
Q | (Australia) J Crabb | **7** | 5 | 3
2 | (Spain) **J C Ferrero** | 5 | **7** | **6**

Second round
1 | (Russia) **M Safin** | 3 | **6** | **6**
(Finland) J Nieminen | **6** | 1 | 2
Q | (South Korea) **H-T Lee** | **7^{7}** | **7**
6 | (United States) A Roddick | 6^{5} | 5
LL | (Argentina) **F Squillari** | **6** | **6**
SE | (Russia) N Davydenko | 1 | 4
(South Africa) **W Ferreira** | 6^{5} | **6** | **6**
(Argentina) J I Chela | **7^{7}** | 4 | 4
8 | (Argentina) G Gaudio | 6^{5} | 0
(Germany) **R Schüttler** | **7^{7}** | **6**
Q | (United States) **M Fish** | **7^{7}** | 4 | **6**
3 | (Spain) C Moyá | 6^{4} | **6** | 4
7 | (Thailand) **P Srichaphan** | 3 | **6** | **6**
(Belarus) M Mirnyi | **6** | 4 | 4
(Russia) M Youzhny | 3 | 2
2 | (Spain) **J C Ferrero** | **6** | **6**

Quarterfinals
1 | (Russia) M Safin
Q | (South Korea) **H-T Lee** | **w/o**
LL | (Argentina) F Squillari | 0 | 4
(South Africa) **W Ferreira** | **6** | **6**
(Germany) **R Schüttler** | **7^{7}** | **6**
Q | (United States) M Fish | 6^{5} | 4
7 | (Thailand) P Srichaphan | 3 | 1
2 | (Spain) **J C Ferrero** | **6** | **6**

Semifinals
Q | (South Korea) **H-T Lee** | **6** | **6**
(South Africa) W Ferreira | 3 | 3
(Germany) R Schüttler | **6** | 3 | 2
2 | (Spain) **J C Ferrero** | 3 | **6** | **6**

Final
Q | (South Korea) **Hyung-Taik Lee** | 4 | **7^{8}** | **7^{7}**
2 | (Spain) Juan Carlos Ferrero | **6** | 6^{6} | 6^{4}
