= 2003 Adidas International – Men's doubles =

Men's doubles
- 2003 Adidas International

Final
- Champions: (Australia) Paul Hanley (Australia) Nathan Healey
- Runners-up: (India) Mahesh Bhupathi (Australia) Joshua Eagle
- Score: 7–6^{(7–3)}, 6–4

Events
Singles	men	women
Doubles	men	women
- Sydney International

Donald Johnson and Jared Palmer were the defending champions but did not compete that year.

Paul Hanley and Nathan Healey won in the final 7–6^{(7–3)}, 6–4 against Mahesh Bhupathi and Joshua Eagle.

== Seeds ==
Champion seeds are indicated in bold text while text in italics indicates the round in which those seeds were eliminated.

1. (The Bahamas) Mark Knowles / (Canada) Daniel Nestor (semifinals)
2. (United States) Bob Bryan / (United States) Mike Bryan (semifinals)
3. (India) Mahesh Bhupathi / (Australia) Joshua Eagle (final)
4. (Czech Republic) Martin Damm / (Czech Republic) Cyril Suk (quarterfinals)

== Draw ==
Key

- Q = Qualifier
- WC = Wild card
- LL = Lucky loser
- Alt = Alternate
- ITF = ITF entry
- PR = Protected ranking
- SR = Special ranking
- SE = Special exempt
- JE = Junior exempt
- JR = Junior Accelerator Programme entrant
- CO = College Accelerator Programme entrant
- NG = Next Gen Accelerator Program entrant
- w/o = Walkover
- r = Retired
- d = Defaulted

First round
1	(The Bahamas) **M Knowles** (Canada) **D Nestor**	6^{4}	**6**	**6**
(Belarus) M Mirnyi (Belarus) V Voltchkov	**7^{7}**	3	3
(Japan) **T Shimada** (Thailand) **P Srichaphan**	**2**
(Russia) M Safin (Federal Republic of Yugoslavia) N Zimonjić	1	r
4	(Czech Republic) **M Damm** (Czech Republic) **C Suk**	**6**	**6**
(Sweden) S Aspelin (Australia) M Hill	3	2
(India) L Paes (Czech Republic) D Rikl	**6**	3	1
WC	(Australia) **P Hanley** (Australia) **N Healey**	2	**6**	**6**
WC	(Australia) A Florent (Australia) S Stolle	3	4
(Australia) **A Kratzmann** (Zimbabwe) **K Ullyett**	**6**	**6**
(Spain) J C Ferrero (Spain) T Robredo	6^{3}	2
3	(India) **M Bhupathi** (Australia) **J Eagle**	**7^{7}**	**6**
(France) J Boutter (France) M Llodra	1	r
(Germany) **K Braasch** (Germany) **R Schüttler**	**2**
(Argentina) G Gaudio (Ecuador) N Lapentti	**6**	3	2
2	(United States) **B Bryan** (United States) **M Bryan**	4	**6**	**6**

Quarterfinals
1	(The Bahamas) **M Knowles** (Canada) **D Nestor**	**6**	**6**
(Japan) T Shimada (Thailand) P Srichaphan	1	4
4	(Czech Republic) M Damm (Czech Republic) C Suk	**6**	4	3
WC	(Australia) **P Hanley** (Australia) **N Healey**	4	**6**	**6**
(Australia) A Kratzmann (Zimbabwe) K Ullyett	2	**6**	6^{6}
3	(India) **M Bhupathi** (Australia) **J Eagle**	**6**	3	**7^{8}**
(Germany) K Braasch (Germany) R Schüttler	6^{4}	3
2	(United States) **B Bryan** (United States) **M Bryan**	**7^{7}**	**6**

Semifinals
1	(The Bahamas) M Knowles (Canada) D Nestor	6^{8}	5
WC	(Australia) **P Hanley** (Australia) **N Healey**	**7^{10}**	**7**
3	(India) **M Bhupathi** (Australia) **J Eagle**	**6**	**6**
2	(United States) B Bryan (United States) M Bryan	3	2

Final
WC	(Australia) **Paul Hanley** (Australia) **Nathan Healey**	**7^{7}**	**6**
3	(India) Mahesh Bhupathi (Australia) Joshua Eagle	6^{3}	4
