= 2003 Adidas International =

- Date: 5–12 January
- Edition: 111th
- Surface: Hard / outdoor
- Location: Sydney, Australia
- Venue: NSW Tennis Centre

Champions

Men's singles
- (South Korea) Lee Hyung-taik

Women's singles
- (Belgium) Kim Clijsters

Men's doubles
- (Australia) Paul Hanley / (Australia) Nathan Healey

Women's doubles
- (Belgium) Kim Clijsters / (Japan) Ai Sugiyama
- Adidas International

The 2003 Adidas International was a combined men's and women's tennis tournament played on outdoor hard courts at the NSW Tennis Centre in Sydney in Australia that was part of the International Series of the 2003 ATP Tour and of Tier II of the 2003 WTA Tour. The tournament ran from 5 through 12 January 2003. Lee Hyung-taik and Kim Clijsters won the singles titles.

== Finals ==
=== Men's singles ===
(South Korea) Lee Hyung-taik defeated (Spain) Juan Carlos Ferrero 4–6, 7–6^{(8–6)}, 7–6^{(7–4)}

- It was Lee's 1st title of the year and the 1st of his career.

=== Women's singles ===
(Belgium) Kim Clijsters defeated (United States) Lindsay Davenport 6–4, 6–3

- It was Clijsters' 1st title of the year and the 15th of her career.

=== Men's doubles ===
(Australia) Paul Hanley / (Australia) Nathan Healey defeated (India) Mahesh Bhupathi / (Australia) Joshua Eagle 7–6^{(7–3)}, 6–4

- It was Hanley's 1st title of the year and the 2nd of his career. It was Healey's only title of the year and the 2nd of his career.

=== Women's doubles ===
(Belgium) Kim Clijsters / (Japan) Ai Sugiyama defeated (Spain) Conchita Martínez / (Australia) Rennae Stubbs 6–3, 6–3

- It was Clijsters' 2nd title of the year and the 16th of her career. It was Sugiyama's 1st title of the year and the 25th of her career.
