= 2003 Open 13 =

- Date: 10–16 February
- Edition: 11th
- Category: International Series
- Draw: 32S / 16D
- Prize money: $455,000
- Surface: Hard / indoor
- Location: Marseille, France
- Venue: Palais des Sports de Marseille

Champions

Singles
- (Switzerland) Roger Federer

Doubles
- (France) Sébastien Grosjean / (France) Fabrice Santoro
- Open 13

The 2003 Open 13 was a men's tennis tournament played on indoor hard courts at the Palais des Sports de Marseille in Marseille in France and was part of the International Series of the 2003 ATP Tour. The tournament ran from 10 February through 16 February 2003. First-seeded Roger Federer won the singles title.

== Finals ==
=== Singles ===
(Switzerland) Roger Federer defeated (Sweden) Jonas Björkman 6–2, 7–6^{(8–6)}

- It was Federer's 1st singles title of the year and the 5th of his career.

=== Doubles ===
(France) Sébastien Grosjean / (France) Fabrice Santoro defeated (Czech Republic) Tomáš Cibulec / (Czech Republic) Pavel Vízner 6–1, 6–4

- It was Grosjean's only title of the year and the 6th of his career. It was Santoro's 1st title of the year and the 14th of his career.
