= 2003 ATP Tour =

Men's tennis circuit

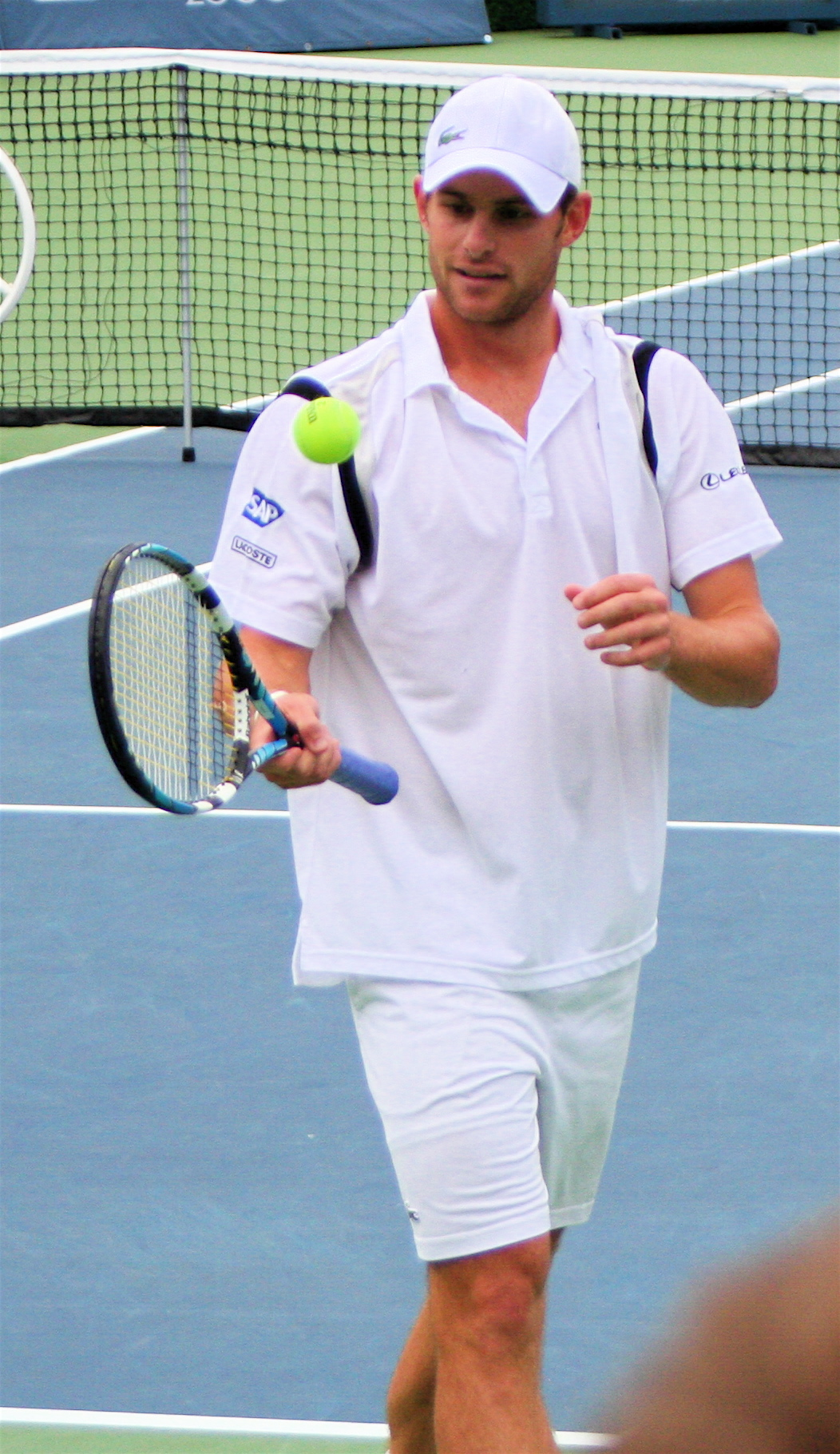
- Andy Roddick finished the year ranked world No. 1 for the first time in his career. He won six tournaments during the season, including a major title at the US Open. He also won two Masters Series events.

Details
- Duration: 28 December 2002 – 8 November 2003
- Edition: 34th
- Tournaments: 68

Achievements (singles)
- Most titles: (Switzerland) Roger Federer (7)
- Most finals: (Switzerland) Roger Federer (9)
- Prize money leader: (Switzerland) Roger Federer ($4,000,680)
- Points leader: (United States) Andy Roddick (4,535)

Awards
- Player of the year: (United States) Andy Roddick
- Doubles team of the year: (United States) Bob Bryan (United States) Mike Bryan
- Most improved player of the year: (Germany) Rainer Schüttler
- Newcomer of the year: (Spain) Rafael Nadal
- Comeback player of the year: (Australia) Mark Philippoussis

The 2003 ATP Tour was the global elite men's professional tennis circuit organised by the Association of Tennis Professionals (ATP) for the 2003 tennis season. The ATP Tour is the elite tour for professional tennis organised by the ATP. The ATP Tour includes the four Grand Slam tournaments, the Tennis Masters Cup, the ATP Masters Series, the International Series Gold and the International Series tournaments.

== Season summary ==
The 2003 ATP Tour season saw 3 new Grand Slam champions and saw Andre Agassi win his eighth and last Grand Slam title when winning the Australian Open for the fourth time. Roger Federer would win his first of 20 Grand Slam titles by defeating Aussie Mark Philippoussis 7–6^{(7–5)}, 6–2, 7–6^{(7–3)} in the final at Wimbledon. Federer would also win his maiden Tennis Masters Cup by defeating Agassi in the final 6–3, 6–0, 6–4. Federer would win 7 titles overall, including winning in Dubai and Halle, tournaments he would have a lot of success at in later seasons. 2003 would be a breakout season for Federer as a dominant player at the very top of the game, improving his year-end ATP ranking from 6 the previous season to 2.

Andy Roddick also had a breakthrough season by winning his first and only Grand Slam title at the US Open and ending the season as world No. 1, 160 points ahead of Federer. Roddick started the season off with an epic victory in the quarterfinals of the Australian Open over Younes El Aynaoui, winning 21–19 in the fifth set after playing for 4 hours and 59 minutes. By doing this, Roddick reached his first major semifinal but was eventually defeated by Rainer Schüttler.

Roddick reached the semifinals of Wimbledon where he was defeated by Federer in straight sets but then won his maiden Masters Series title in Montreal, beating Federer in the semis on route. Roddick would then go on to win back to back Masters Series titles by winning Cincinnati. At the US Open, Roddick saved a match point en route to the title in the semifinals against David Nalbandian, which he won 6–7^{(4–7)}, 3–6, 7–6^{(9–7)}, 6–1, 6–3. He went on to defeat Juan Carlos Ferrero 6–3, 7–6^{(7–2)}, 6–3 in the final. Roddick became one of only three players to win Canada, Cincinnati and the US Open consecutively along with Patrick Rafter in 1998 and Rafael Nadal in 2013.

Juan Carlos Ferrero also added his name to the list of maiden Grand Slam champions in 2003 when he won the French Open, having lost in the final the previous year. He defeated surprise finalist Martin Verkerk 6–1, 6–3, 6–2. Ferrero also captured Masters Series titles in Monte Carlo and Madrid and went on to end the season as world No. 3.

Andre Agassi won his eighth and final Grand Slam title by defeating Rainer Schüttler in the final of the Australian Open 6–2, 6–2, 6–1. In March, Agassi won his sixth Miami Masters title and his 16th Masters title overall. On April 28, Agassi reclaimed his position at the top of the ATP rankings for the first time since 2000. He then replicated this feat when recapturing the No. 1 ranking on June 16, a position he maintained for 13 weeks. By being No. 1 in the rankings, he became the oldest world No. 1 at 33 years and 3 months of age, a record not broken till Federer got to the top of the rankings in 2018. Agassi lost in the semifinals of the US Open to Ferrero.

Young Argentine Guillermo Coria had a breakout season in 2003, rising from world No. 45 in 2002 to 5 at the end of the year. He won his first Masters Series title in Hamburg and reached the semifinals of the French Open. Félix Mantilla caused an upset by capturing his first and only Masters title in Rome, picking up wins over Costa, Kafelnikov and Federer on the way. 4-time Wimbledon semi finalist Tim Henman also captured his lone Masters Series title by impressively coming through the draw in Paris, defeating the likes of Federer and Roddick on the way before defeating Andrei Pavel in the final.

2002 Wimbledon champion Lleyton Hewitt’s form dropped in 2003, losing his world No. 1 position and dropping out of the top 10. Despite failing to reach a Grand Slam semifinal in 2003, Hewitt did however defend the title at the Indian Wells Masters and was instrumental in helping Australia win the Davis Cup title. Hewitt defeated Federer in the semifinals from 2 sets down to help Australia reach the final. He then defeated Ferrero in the final in another 5 set victory to help Australia capture their 28th Davis Cup crown. Mark Philippoussis beat Ferrero to see Australia claim the victory over Spain 3–1 in Melbourne.

== Schedule ==
The table below shows the 2003 ATP Tour schedule.

Key

Grand Slam
Tennis Masters Cup
Tennis Masters Series
ATP International Series Gold
ATP International Series
Team Events

=== January ===
Week	Tournament	Champions	Runners-up	Semifinalists	Quarterfinalists
30 Dec	Hopman Cup; Perth, Australia; ITF Mixed Team Championships; Hard (i) – 8 teams (RR)	United States; 3–0	Australia	Round Robin (Group A) Spain; Uzbekistan; Belgium	Round Robin (Group B) Czech Republic; Italy; Slovakia
30 Dec	2003 AAPT Championships; Adelaide, Australia; ATP International Series $380,000 – Hard; Singles – Doubles	(Russia) Nikolay Davydenko; 6–2, 7–6^{(7–3)}	(Belgium) Kristof Vliegen	(Netherlands) Richard Krajicek (Romania) Adrian Voinea	(United States) Brian Vahaly (Spain) Alberto Martín (Argentina) Mariano Zabaleta (France) Antony Dupuis
30 Dec	2003 AAPT Championships; Adelaide, Australia; ATP International Series $380,000 – Hard; Singles – Doubles	(South Africa) Jeff Coetzee (South Africa) Chris Haggard; 2–6, 6–4, 7–6^{(9–7)}	(Belarus) Max Mirnyi (United States) Jeff Morrison	(Netherlands) Richard Krajicek (Romania) Adrian Voinea	(United States) Brian Vahaly (Spain) Alberto Martín (Argentina) Mariano Zabaleta (France) Antony Dupuis
30 Dec	2003 Tata Open; Chennai, India; ATP International Series $380,000 – Hard; Singles – Doubles	(Thailand) Paradorn Srichaphan; 6–3, 6–1	(Slovakia) Karol Kučera	(Argentina) Juan Ignacio Chela (France) Jean-René Lisnard	(Argentina) Guillermo Cañas (Germany) Tomas Behrend (Germany) Rainer Schüttler (Armenia) Sargis Sargsian
30 Dec	2003 Tata Open; Chennai, India; ATP International Series $380,000 – Hard; Singles – Doubles	(Austria) Julian Knowle (Germany) Michael Kohlmann; 7–6^{(7–1)}, 7–6^{(7–3)}	(Czech Republic) František Čermák (Czech Republic) Leoš Friedl	(Argentina) Juan Ignacio Chela (France) Jean-René Lisnard	(Argentina) Guillermo Cañas (Germany) Tomas Behrend (Germany) Rainer Schüttler (Armenia) Sargis Sargsian
30 Dec	2003 Qatar Open; Doha, Qatar; ATP International Series $1,000,000 – Hard; Singles – Doubles	(Austria) Stefan Koubek; 6–4, 6–4	(United States) Jan-Michael Gambill	(Russia) Mikhail Youzhny (Morocco) Younes El Aynaoui	(Switzerland) Roger Federer (Spain) Fernando Vicente (France) Fabrice Santoro (Sweden) Andreas Vinciguerra
30 Dec	2003 Qatar Open; Doha, Qatar; ATP International Series $1,000,000 – Hard; Singles – Doubles	(Czech Republic) Martin Damm (Czech Republic) Cyril Suk; 3–6, 6–1, 7–6^{(7–4)}	(The Bahamas) Mark Knowles (Canada) Daniel Nestor	(Russia) Mikhail Youzhny (Morocco) Younes El Aynaoui	(Switzerland) Roger Federer (Spain) Fernando Vicente (France) Fabrice Santoro (Sweden) Andreas Vinciguerra
6 Jan	2003 Heineken Open; Auckland, New Zealand; ATP International Series $380,000 – Hard; Singles – Doubles	(Brazil) Gustavo Kuerten; 6–3, 7–5	(Slovakia) Dominik Hrbatý	(Spain) Félix Mantilla (Argentina) Mariano Zabaleta	(Czech Republic) Jiří Novák (Spain) David Ferrer (Argentina) Guillermo Coria (Austria) Stefan Koubek
6 Jan	2003 Heineken Open; Auckland, New Zealand; ATP International Series $380,000 – Hard; Singles – Doubles	(South Africa) David Adams (South Africa) Robbie Koenig; 7–6^{(7–5)}, 3–6, 6–3	(Czech Republic) Tomáš Cibulec (Czech Republic) Leoš Friedl	(Spain) Félix Mantilla (Argentina) Mariano Zabaleta	(Czech Republic) Jiří Novák (Spain) David Ferrer (Argentina) Guillermo Coria (Austria) Stefan Koubek
6 Jan	2003 Adidas International; Sydney, Australia; ATP International Series $380,000 – Hard; Singles – Doubles	(South Korea) Hyung-Taik Lee; 4–6, 7–6^{(8–6)}, 7–6^{(7–4)}	(Spain) Juan Carlos Ferrero	(South Africa) Wayne Ferreira (Germany) Rainer Schüttler	(Russia) Marat Safin (Argentina) Franco Squillari (United States) Mardy Fish (Thailand) Paradorn Srichaphan
6 Jan	2003 Adidas International; Sydney, Australia; ATP International Series $380,000 – Hard; Singles – Doubles	(Australia) Paul Hanley (Australia) Nathan Healey; 7–6^{(7–3)}, 6–4	(India) Mahesh Bhupathi (Australia) Joshua Eagle	(South Africa) Wayne Ferreira (Germany) Rainer Schüttler	(Russia) Marat Safin (Argentina) Franco Squillari (United States) Mardy Fish (Thailand) Paradorn Srichaphan
13 Jan; 20 Jan	2003 Australian Open; Melbourne, Australia; Grand Slam $10,591,690 – Hard – 128S/64D/32XD; Singles – Doubles – Mixed doubles	(United States) Andre Agassi; 6–2, 6–2, 6–1	(Germany) Rainer Schüttler	(United States) Andy Roddick (South Africa) Wayne Ferreira	(Morocco) Younes El Aynaoui (Argentina) David Nalbandian (Spain) Juan Carlos Ferrero (France) Sébastien Grosjean
13 Jan; 20 Jan	2003 Australian Open; Melbourne, Australia; Grand Slam $10,591,690 – Hard – 128S/64D/32XD; Singles – Doubles – Mixed doubles	(France) Michaël Llodra (France) Fabrice Santoro; 6–4, 3–6, 6–3	(The Bahamas) Mark Knowles (Canada) Daniel Nestor	(United States) Andy Roddick (South Africa) Wayne Ferreira	(Morocco) Younes El Aynaoui (Argentina) David Nalbandian (Spain) Juan Carlos Ferrero (France) Sébastien Grosjean
13 Jan; 20 Jan	2003 Australian Open; Melbourne, Australia; Grand Slam $10,591,690 – Hard – 128S/64D/32XD; Singles – Doubles – Mixed doubles	(India) Leander Paes (United States) Martina Navratilova; 6–4, 7–5	(Australia) Todd Woodbridge (Greece) Eleni Daniilidou	(United States) Andy Roddick (South Africa) Wayne Ferreira	(Morocco) Younes El Aynaoui (Argentina) David Nalbandian (Spain) Juan Carlos Ferrero (France) Sébastien Grosjean
27 Jan	2003 Milan Open; Milan, Italy; ATP International Series $380,000 – Carpet (i); Singles – Doubles	(Netherlands) Martin Verkerk; 6–4, 5–7, 7–5	(Russia) Yevgeny Kafelnikov	(Finland) Jarkko Nieminen (Croatia) Ivan Ljubičić	(Netherlands) Richard Krajicek (Sweden) Jonas Björkman (France) Julien Varlet (Italy) Davide Sanguinetti
27 Jan	2003 Milan Open; Milan, Italy; ATP International Series $380,000 – Carpet (i); Singles – Doubles	(Czech Republic) Petr Luxa (Czech Republic) Radek Štěpánek; 6–4, 7–6^{(7–4)}	(Czech Republic) Tomáš Cibulec (Czech Republic) Pavel Vízner	(Finland) Jarkko Nieminen (Croatia) Ivan Ljubičić	(Netherlands) Richard Krajicek (Sweden) Jonas Björkman (France) Julien Varlet (Italy) Davide Sanguinetti

=== February ===
Week	Tournament	Champions	Runners-up	Semifinalists	Quarterfinalists
3 Feb	Davis Cup by BNP Paribas First Round; Bucharest, Romania – Carpet (i); Arnhem, Netherlands – Carpet (i); Sydney, Australia – Clay (red); Helsingborg, Sweden – Carpet (i); Zagreb, Croatia – Carpet (i); Seville, Spain – Clay (red); Buenos Aires, Argentina – Clay (red); Ostrava, Czech Republic – Clay (red) (i)	First-round winners France 4–1; Switzerland 3–2; Australia 4–1; Sweden 3–2; Croatia 4–1; Spain 5–0; Argentina 5–0; Russia 3–2	First-round losers Romania; Netherlands; Great Britain; Brazil; United States; Belgium; Germany; Czech Republic		
10 Feb	2003 Open 13; Marseille, France; ATP International Series $500,000 – Hard (i); Singles – Doubles	(Switzerland) Roger Federer; 6–2, 7–6^{(8–6)}	(Sweden) Jonas Björkman	(Slovakia) Karol Kučera (France) Nicolas Escudé	(Netherlands) Raemon Sluiter (Belgium) Olivier Rochus (Slovakia) Dominik Hrbatý (France) Rodolphe Cadart
10 Feb	2003 Open 13; Marseille, France; ATP International Series $500,000 – Hard (i); Singles – Doubles	(France) Sébastien Grosjean (France) Fabrice Santoro; 6–1, 6–4	(Czech Republic) Tomáš Cibulec (Czech Republic) Pavel Vízner	(Slovakia) Karol Kučera (France) Nicolas Escudé	(Netherlands) Raemon Sluiter (Belgium) Olivier Rochus (Slovakia) Dominik Hrbatý (France) Rodolphe Cadart
10 Feb	2003 Siebel Open; San Jose, US; ATP International Series $380,000 – Hard (i); Singles – Doubles	(United States) Andre Agassi; 6–3, 6–1	(Italy) Davide Sanguinetti	(United States) James Blake (United States) Justin Gimelstob	(Belarus) Vladimir Voltchkov (Russia) Nikolay Davydenko (United States) Vincent Spadea (Denmark) Kenneth Carlsen
10 Feb	2003 Siebel Open; San Jose, US; ATP International Series $380,000 – Hard (i); Singles – Doubles	(South Korea) Hyung-Taik Lee (Belarus) Vladimir Voltchkov; 7–5, 4–6, 6–3	(United States) Paul Goldstein (United States) Robert Kendrick	(United States) James Blake (United States) Justin Gimelstob	(Belarus) Vladimir Voltchkov (Russia) Nikolay Davydenko (United States) Vincent Spadea (Denmark) Kenneth Carlsen
10 Feb	2003 Bell South Open; Viña del Mar, Chile; ATP International Series $345,000 – Clay; Singles – Doubles	(Spain) David Sánchez; 1–6, 6–3, 6–3	(Chile) Marcelo Ríos	(Argentina) Gastón Gaudio (Spain) Albert Montañés	(Spain) Félix Mantilla (Argentina) Agustín Calleri (Italy) Andrea Gaudenzi (Czech Republic) Jiří Vaněk
10 Feb	2003 Bell South Open; Viña del Mar, Chile; ATP International Series $345,000 – Clay; Singles – Doubles	(Argentina) Agustín Calleri (Argentina) Mariano Hood; 6–3, 1–6, 6–4	(Czech Republic) František Čermák (Czech Republic) Leoš Friedl	(Argentina) Gastón Gaudio (Spain) Albert Montañés	(Spain) Félix Mantilla (Argentina) Agustín Calleri (Italy) Andrea Gaudenzi (Czech Republic) Jiří Vaněk
17 Feb	2003 Kroger St. Jude International; Memphis, US; ATP International Series Gold $690,000 – Hard (i); Singles – Doubles	(United States) Taylor Dent; 6–1, 6–4	(United States) Andy Roddick	(United States) Brian Vahaly (United States) Vincent Spadea	(United States) Robby Ginepri (Georgia (country)) Irakli Labadze (Belarus) Vladimir Voltchkov (United States) Mardy Fish
17 Feb	2003 Kroger St. Jude International; Memphis, US; ATP International Series Gold $690,000 – Hard (i); Singles – Doubles	(The Bahamas) Mark Knowles (Canada) Daniel Nestor; 6–2, 7–6^{(7–3)}	(United States) Bob Bryan (United States) Mike Bryan	(United States) Brian Vahaly (United States) Vincent Spadea	(United States) Robby Ginepri (Georgia (country)) Irakli Labadze (Belarus) Vladimir Voltchkov (United States) Mardy Fish
17 Feb	2003 ABN AMRO World Tennis Tournament; Rotterdam, Netherlands; ATP International Series Gold $800,000 – Hard (i); Singles – Doubles	(Belarus) Max Mirnyi; 7–6^{(7–3)}, 6–4	(Netherlands) Raemon Sluiter	(France) Sébastien Grosjean (Switzerland) Roger Federer	(Spain) Juan Carlos Ferrero (France) Nicolas Escudé (Russia) Yevgeny Kafelnikov (Netherlands) Sjeng Schalken
17 Feb	2003 ABN AMRO World Tennis Tournament; Rotterdam, Netherlands; ATP International Series Gold $800,000 – Hard (i); Singles – Doubles	(Australia) Wayne Arthurs (Australia) Paul Hanley; 7–6^{(7–3)}, 6–2	(Switzerland) Roger Federer (Belarus) Max Mirnyi	(France) Sébastien Grosjean (Switzerland) Roger Federer	(Spain) Juan Carlos Ferrero (France) Nicolas Escudé (Russia) Yevgeny Kafelnikov (Netherlands) Sjeng Schalken
17 Feb	2003 Copa AT&T; Buenos Aires, Argentina; ATP International Series $380,000 – Clay; Singles – Doubles	(Spain) Carlos Moyà; 6–3, 4–6, 6–4	(Argentina) Guillermo Coria	(Brazil) Gustavo Kuerten (Argentina) Gastón Gaudio	(Peru) Luis Horna (Spain) Félix Mantilla (Argentina) Juan Ignacio Chela (Argentina) David Nalbandian
17 Feb	2003 Copa AT&T; Buenos Aires, Argentina; ATP International Series $380,000 – Clay; Singles – Doubles	(Argentina) Mariano Hood (Argentina) Sebastián Prieto; 6–2, 6–2	(Argentina) Lucas Arnold Ker (Argentina) David Nalbandian	(Brazil) Gustavo Kuerten (Argentina) Gastón Gaudio	(Peru) Luis Horna (Spain) Félix Mantilla (Argentina) Juan Ignacio Chela (Argentina) David Nalbandian
24 Feb	2003 Abierto Mexicano Telefonica Movistar; Acapulco, Mexico; ATP International Series Gold $690,000 – Clay; Singles – Doubles	(Argentina) Agustín Calleri; 7–5, 3–6, 6–3	(Argentina) Mariano Zabaleta	(Spain) Félix Mantilla (Brazil) Gustavo Kuerten	(Spain) Carlos Moyà (Chile) Marcelo Ríos (Chile) Fernando González (Peru) Iván Miranda
24 Feb	2003 Abierto Mexicano Telefonica Movistar; Acapulco, Mexico; ATP International Series Gold $690,000 – Clay; Singles – Doubles	(The Bahamas) Mark Knowles (Canada) Daniel Nestor; 6–3, 6–3	(Spain) David Ferrer (Spain) Fernando Vicente	(Spain) Félix Mantilla (Brazil) Gustavo Kuerten	(Spain) Carlos Moyà (Chile) Marcelo Ríos (Chile) Fernando González (Peru) Iván Miranda
24 Feb	2003 Dubai Tennis Open; Dubai, United Arab Emirates; ATP International Series Gold $1,000,000 – Hard; Singles – Doubles	(Switzerland) Roger Federer; 6–1, 7–6^{(7–2)}	(Czech Republic) Jiří Novák	(Croatia) Ivan Ljubičić (Spain) Tommy Robredo	(Morocco) Hicham Arazi (Germany) Rainer Schüttler (Netherlands) Sjeng Schalken (Spain) Feliciano López
24 Feb	2003 Dubai Tennis Open; Dubai, United Arab Emirates; ATP International Series Gold $1,000,000 – Hard; Singles – Doubles	(India) Leander Paes (Czech Republic) David Rikl; 6–3, 6–0	(Zimbabwe) Wayne Black (Zimbabwe) Kevin Ullyett	(Croatia) Ivan Ljubičić (Spain) Tommy Robredo	(Morocco) Hicham Arazi (Germany) Rainer Schüttler (Netherlands) Sjeng Schalken (Spain) Feliciano López
24 Feb	2003 Copenhagen Open; Copenhagen, Denmark; ATP International Series $380,000 – Hard (i); Singles – Doubles	(Slovakia) Karol Kučera; 7–6^{(7–4)}, 6–4	(Belgium) Olivier Rochus	(Czech Republic) Radek Štěpánek (Australia) Wayne Arthurs	(Germany) Tomas Behrend (Slovakia) Karol Beck (Switzerland) Michel Kratochvil (Sweden) Magnus Norman
24 Feb	2003 Copenhagen Open; Copenhagen, Denmark; ATP International Series $380,000 – Hard (i); Singles – Doubles	(Czech Republic) Tomáš Cibulec (Czech Republic) Pavel Vízner; 7–5, 5–7, 6–2	(Austria) Julian Knowle (Germany) Michael Kohlmann	(Czech Republic) Radek Štěpánek (Australia) Wayne Arthurs	(Germany) Tomas Behrend (Slovakia) Karol Beck (Switzerland) Michel Kratochvil (Sweden) Magnus Norman

=== March ===
Week	Tournament	Champions	Runners-up	Semifinalists	Quarterfinalists
3 Mar	Delray Beach International Tennis Championships; Delray Beach, US; ATP International Series $380,000 – Hard; Singles – Doubles	(United States) Jan-Michael Gambill; 6–0, 7–6^{(7–5)}	(United States) Mardy Fish	(Chile) Marcelo Ríos (United States) Robert Kendrick	(Spain) Alberto Martín (South Korea) Hyung-Taik Lee (Brazil) Flávio Saretta (Belarus) Vladimir Voltchkov
3 Mar	Delray Beach International Tennis Championships; Delray Beach, US; ATP International Series $380,000 – Hard; Singles – Doubles	(India) Leander Paes (Serbia and Montenegro) Nenad Zimonjić; 7–5, 3–6, 7–5	(Netherlands) Raemon Sluiter (Netherlands) Martin Verkerk	(Chile) Marcelo Ríos (United States) Robert Kendrick	(Spain) Alberto Martín (South Korea) Hyung-Taik Lee (Brazil) Flávio Saretta (Belarus) Vladimir Voltchkov
3 Mar	Franklin Templeton Tennis Classic; Scottsdale, US; ATP International Series $380,000 – Hard; Singles – Doubles	(Australia) Lleyton Hewitt; 6–4, 6–4	(Australia) Mark Philippoussis	(United States) Taylor Dent (Argentina) Mariano Zabaleta	(Spain) Àlex Corretja (Spain) David Sánchez (Argentina) David Nalbandian (United States) James Blake
3 Mar	Franklin Templeton Tennis Classic; Scottsdale, US; ATP International Series $380,000 – Hard; Singles – Doubles	(United States) James Blake (The Bahamas) Mark Merklein; 6–4, 6–7^{(2–7)}, 7–6^{(7–5)}	(Australia) Lleyton Hewitt (Australia) Mark Philippoussis	(United States) Taylor Dent (Argentina) Mariano Zabaleta	(Spain) Àlex Corretja (Spain) David Sánchez (Argentina) David Nalbandian (United States) James Blake
10 Mar	Pacific Life Open; Indian Wells, US; Tennis Masters Series $2,200,000 – Hard; Singles – Doubles	(Australia) Lleyton Hewitt; 6–1, 6–1	(Brazil) Gustavo Kuerten	(United States) Vincent Spadea (Germany) Rainer Schüttler	(United States) Robby Ginepri (United States) Brian Vahaly (United States) James Blake (United States) Andy Roddick
10 Mar	Pacific Life Open; Indian Wells, US; Tennis Masters Series $2,200,000 – Hard; Singles – Doubles	(South Africa) Wayne Ferreira (Russia) Yevgeny Kafelnikov; 3–6, 7–5, 6–4	(United States) Bob Bryan (United States) Mike Bryan	(United States) Vincent Spadea (Germany) Rainer Schüttler	(United States) Robby Ginepri (United States) Brian Vahaly (United States) James Blake (United States) Andy Roddick
17 Mar; 24 Mar	NASDAQ-100 Open; Key Biscayne, US; Tennis Masters Series $3,000,000 – Hard; Singles – Doubles	(United States) Andre Agassi; 6–3, 6–3	(Spain) Carlos Moyà	(Thailand) Paradorn Srichaphan (Spain) Albert Costa	(United States) Robby Ginepri (United States) Todd Martin (Switzerland) Roger Federer (Morocco) Younes El Aynaoui
17 Mar; 24 Mar	NASDAQ-100 Open; Key Biscayne, US; Tennis Masters Series $3,000,000 – Hard; Singles – Doubles	(Switzerland) Roger Federer (Belarus) Max Mirnyi; 7–5, 6–3	(India) Leander Paes (Czech Republic) David Rikl	(Thailand) Paradorn Srichaphan (Spain) Albert Costa	(United States) Robby Ginepri (United States) Todd Martin (Switzerland) Roger Federer (Morocco) Younes El Aynaoui
31 Mar	Davis Cup by BNP Paribas Quarterfinals; Toulouse, France – Hard (i); Malmö, Sweden – Hard (i); Valencia, Spain – Clay (red); Buenos Aires, Argentina – Clay (red)	Quarterfinal winners Switzerland 3–2; Australia 5–0; Spain 5–0; Argentina 5–0	Quarterfinal losers France; Sweden; Croatia; Russia		

=== April ===
Week	Tournament	Champions	Runners-up	Semifinalists	Quarterfinalists
7 Apr	2003 Grand Prix Hassan II; Casablanca, Morocco; ATP International Series $400,000 – Clay; Singles – Doubles	(France) Julien Boutter; 6–2, 2–6, 6–1	(Morocco) Younes El Aynaoui	(Morocco) Hicham Arazi (Slovakia) Dominik Hrbatý	(Chile) Nicolás Massú (France) Olivier Mutis (Argentina) Federico Browne (Brazil) Flávio Saretta
7 Apr	2003 Grand Prix Hassan II; Casablanca, Morocco; ATP International Series $400,000 – Clay; Singles – Doubles	(Czech Republic) František Čermák (Czech Republic) Leoš Friedl; 6–3, 7–5	(United States) Devin Bowen (Australia) Ashley Fisher	(Morocco) Hicham Arazi (Slovakia) Dominik Hrbatý	(Chile) Nicolás Massú (France) Olivier Mutis (Argentina) Federico Browne (Brazil) Flávio Saretta
7 Apr	2003 Estoril Open; Oeiras, Portugal; ATP International Series $525,000 – Clay; Singles – Doubles	(Russia) Nikolay Davydenko; 6–4, 6–3	(Argentina) Agustín Calleri	(Spain) Tommy Robredo (Belarus) Max Mirnyi	(Spain) Galo Blanco (Chile) Fernando González (Russia) Yevgeny Kafelnikov (Spain) Feliciano López
7 Apr	2003 Estoril Open; Oeiras, Portugal; ATP International Series $525,000 – Clay; Singles – Doubles	(India) Mahesh Bhupathi (Belarus) Max Mirnyi; 6–1, 6–2	(Argentina) Lucas Arnold Ker (Argentina) Mariano Hood	(Spain) Tommy Robredo (Belarus) Max Mirnyi	(Spain) Galo Blanco (Chile) Fernando González (Russia) Yevgeny Kafelnikov (Spain) Feliciano López
14 Apr	2003 Monte Carlo Masters; Roquebrune-Cap-Martin, France; Tennis Masters Series $2,200,000 – Clay; Singles – Doubles	(Spain) Juan Carlos Ferrero; 6–2, 6–2	(Argentina) Guillermo Coria	(United States) Vincent Spadea (Spain) Carlos Moyà	(Spain) Alberto Martín (Italy) Filippo Volandri (Argentina) Juan Ignacio Chela (France) Julien Boutter
14 Apr	2003 Monte Carlo Masters; Roquebrune-Cap-Martin, France; Tennis Masters Series $2,200,000 – Clay; Singles – Doubles	(India) Mahesh Bhupathi (Belarus) Max Mirnyi; 6–4, 3–6, 7–6^{(8–6)}	(France) Michaël Llodra (France) Fabrice Santoro	(United States) Vincent Spadea (Spain) Carlos Moyà	(Spain) Alberto Martín (Italy) Filippo Volandri (Argentina) Juan Ignacio Chela (France) Julien Boutter
21 Apr	2003 Open Seat Godo; Barcelona, Spain; ATP International Series Gold $1,000,000 – Clay; Singles – Doubles	(Spain) Carlos Moyà; 5–7, 6–2, 6–2, 3–0 ret.	(Russia) Marat Safin	(Spain) Juan Carlos Ferrero (Argentina) Agustín Calleri	(Brazil) Gustavo Kuerten (Argentina) Gastón Gaudio (Spain) Tommy Robredo (Russia) Nikolay Davydenko
21 Apr	2003 Open Seat Godo; Barcelona, Spain; ATP International Series Gold $1,000,000 – Clay; Singles – Doubles	(United States) Bob Bryan (United States) Mike Bryan; 6–4, 6–3	(South Africa) Chris Haggard (South Africa) Robbie Koenig	(Spain) Juan Carlos Ferrero (Argentina) Agustín Calleri	(Brazil) Gustavo Kuerten (Argentina) Gastón Gaudio (Spain) Tommy Robredo (Russia) Nikolay Davydenko
21 Apr	2003 U.S. Men's Clay Court Championships; Houston, US; ATP International Series $400,000 – Clay; Singles – Doubles	(United States) Andre Agassi; 3–6, 6–3, 6–4	(United States) Andy Roddick	(Austria) Jürgen Melzer (France) Olivier Mutis	(Brazil) Ricardo Mello (United States) Mardy Fish (United States) James Blake (Brazil) Fernando Meligeni
21 Apr	2003 U.S. Men's Clay Court Championships; Houston, US; ATP International Series $400,000 – Clay; Singles – Doubles	(The Bahamas) Mark Knowles (Canada) Daniel Nestor; 6–4, 6–3	(United States) Jan-Michael Gambill (United States) Graydon Oliver	(Austria) Jürgen Melzer (France) Olivier Mutis	(Brazil) Ricardo Mello (United States) Mardy Fish (United States) James Blake (Brazil) Fernando Meligeni
28 Apr	2003 BMW Open; Munich, Germany; ATP International Series $400,000 – Clay; Singles – Doubles	(Switzerland) Roger Federer; 6–1, 6–4	(Finland) Jarkko Nieminen	(Austria) Stefan Koubek (Russia) Yevgeny Kafelnikov	(Russia) Mikhail Youzhny (Germany) Rainer Schüttler (Netherlands) Sjeng Schalken (Czech Republic) Radek Štěpánek
28 Apr	2003 BMW Open; Munich, Germany; ATP International Series $400,000 – Clay; Singles – Doubles	(Zimbabwe) Wayne Black (Zimbabwe) Kevin Ullyett; 6–3, 7–5	(Australia) Joshua Eagle (United States) Jared Palmer	(Austria) Stefan Koubek (Russia) Yevgeny Kafelnikov	(Russia) Mikhail Youzhny (Germany) Rainer Schüttler (Netherlands) Sjeng Schalken (Czech Republic) Radek Štěpánek
28 Apr	2003 CAM Open Comunidad Valenciana; Valencia, Spain; ATP International Series $400,000 – Clay; Singles – Doubles	(Spain) Juan Carlos Ferrero; 6–2, 6–4	(Belgium) Christophe Rochus	(Brazil) Flávio Saretta (Spain) Fernando Vicente	(Argentina) Agustín Calleri (Argentina) Gastón Gaudio (Chile) Nicolás Massú (Armenia) Sargis Sargsian
28 Apr	2003 CAM Open Comunidad Valenciana; Valencia, Spain; ATP International Series $400,000 – Clay; Singles – Doubles	(Argentina) Lucas Arnold Ker (Argentina) Mariano Hood; 6–1, 6–7^{(7–9)}, 6–4	(United States) Brian MacPhie (Serbia and Montenegro) Nenad Zimonjić	(Brazil) Flávio Saretta (Spain) Fernando Vicente	(Argentina) Agustín Calleri (Argentina) Gastón Gaudio (Chile) Nicolás Massú (Armenia) Sargis Sargsian

=== May ===
Week	Tournament	Champions	Runners-up	Semifinalists	Quarterfinalists
5 May	2003 Telecom Italia Masters; Rome, Italy; Tennis Masters Series $2,200,000 – Clay; Singles – Doubles	(Spain) Félix Mantilla; 7–5, 6–2, 7–6^{(10–8)}	(Switzerland) Roger Federer	(Russia) Yevgeny Kafelnikov (Spain) Juan Carlos Ferrero	(Croatia) Ivan Ljubičić (Netherlands) Martin Verkerk (Italy) Filippo Volandri (Germany) Rainer Schüttler
5 May	2003 Telecom Italia Masters; Rome, Italy; Tennis Masters Series $2,200,000 – Clay; Singles – Doubles	(Australia) Wayne Arthurs (Australia) Paul Hanley; 6–1, 6–3	(France) Michaël Llodra (France) Fabrice Santoro	(Russia) Yevgeny Kafelnikov (Spain) Juan Carlos Ferrero	(Croatia) Ivan Ljubičić (Netherlands) Martin Verkerk (Italy) Filippo Volandri (Germany) Rainer Schüttler
12 May	2003 Hamburg Masters; Hamburg, Germany; Tennis Masters Series $2,200,000 – Clay; Singles – Doubles	(Argentina) Guillermo Coria; 6–3, 6–4, 6–4	(Argentina) Agustín Calleri	(Argentina) David Nalbandian (Argentina) Gastón Gaudio	(Chile) Fernando González (South Africa) Wayne Ferreira (Australia) Mark Philippoussis (Belgium) Olivier Rochus
12 May	2003 Hamburg Masters; Hamburg, Germany; Tennis Masters Series $2,200,000 – Clay; Singles – Doubles	(The Bahamas) Mark Knowles (Canada) Daniel Nestor; 6–4, 7–6(10)	(India) Mahesh Bhupathi (Belarus) Max Mirnyi	(Argentina) David Nalbandian (Argentina) Gastón Gaudio	(Chile) Fernando González (South Africa) Wayne Ferreira (Australia) Mark Philippoussis (Belgium) Olivier Rochus
19 May	2003 ARAG World Team Cup; Düsseldorf, Germany; World Team Cup $1,850,000 – Clay	Chile; 2–1	Czech Republic	Round Robin (Red Group) Australia; Spain; United States	Round Robin (Blue Group) Argentina; Germany; Sweden
19 May	2003 Internationaler Raiffeisen Grand Prix; St. Poelten, Austria; ATP International Series $380,000 – Clay; Singles – Doubles	(United States) Andy Roddick; 6–3, 6–2	(Russia) Nikolay Davydenko	(Spain) David Sánchez (Netherlands) Martin Verkerk	(Netherlands) Richard Krajicek (Croatia) Mario Ančić (Brazil) Flávio Saretta (France) Antony Dupuis
19 May	2003 Internationaler Raiffeisen Grand Prix; St. Poelten, Austria; ATP International Series $380,000 – Clay; Singles – Doubles	(Sweden) Simon Aspelin (Italy) Massimo Bertolini; 6–4, 6–7(8), 6–3	(Armenia) Sargis Sargsian (Serbia and Montenegro) Nenad Zimonjić	(Spain) David Sánchez (Netherlands) Martin Verkerk	(Netherlands) Richard Krajicek (Croatia) Mario Ančić (Brazil) Flávio Saretta (France) Antony Dupuis
26 May; 2 Jun	2003 French Open; Paris, France; Grand Slam $7,202,717 – Clay – 128S/64D/32XD; Singles – Doubles – Mixed doubles	(Spain) Juan Carlos Ferrero; 6–1, 6–3, 6–2	(Netherlands) Martin Verkerk	(Spain) Albert Costa (Argentina) Guillermo Coria	(Spain) Tommy Robredo (Chile) Fernando González (Spain) Carlos Moyà (United States) Andre Agassi
26 May; 2 Jun	2003 French Open; Paris, France; Grand Slam $7,202,717 – Clay – 128S/64D/32XD; Singles – Doubles – Mixed doubles	(United States) Bob Bryan (United States) Mike Bryan; 7–6^{(7–3)}, 6–3	(Netherlands) Paul Haarhuis (Russia) Yevgeny Kafelnikov	(Spain) Albert Costa (Argentina) Guillermo Coria	(Spain) Tommy Robredo (Chile) Fernando González (Spain) Carlos Moyà (United States) Andre Agassi
26 May; 2 Jun	2003 French Open; Paris, France; Grand Slam $7,202,717 – Clay – 128S/64D/32XD; Singles – Doubles – Mixed doubles	(United States) Mike Bryan (United States) Lisa Raymond; 6–3, 6–4	(India) Mahesh Bhupathi (Russia) Elena Likhovtseva	(Spain) Albert Costa (Argentina) Guillermo Coria	(Spain) Tommy Robredo (Chile) Fernando González (Spain) Carlos Moyà (United States) Andre Agassi

=== June ===
Week	Tournament	Champions	Runners-up	Semifinalists	Quarterfinalists
9 Jun	2003 Gerry Weber Open; Halle, NRW, Germany; ATP International Series $800,000 – Grass; Singles – Doubles	(Switzerland) Roger Federer; 6–1, 6–3	(Germany) Nicolas Kiefer	(Russia) Mikhail Youzhny (France) Arnaud Clément	(Morocco) Younes El Aynaoui (Czech Republic) Jiří Novák (Slovakia) Karol Kučera (Czech Republic) Radek Štěpánek
9 Jun	2003 Gerry Weber Open; Halle, NRW, Germany; ATP International Series $800,000 – Grass; Singles – Doubles	(Sweden) Jonas Björkman (Australia) Todd Woodbridge; 6–3, 6–4	(Czech Republic) Martin Damm (Czech Republic) Cyril Suk	(Russia) Mikhail Youzhny (France) Arnaud Clément	(Morocco) Younes El Aynaoui (Czech Republic) Jiří Novák (Slovakia) Karol Kučera (Czech Republic) Radek Štěpánek
9 Jun	2003 Stella Artois Championships; Queen's Club, London, UK; ATP International Series $800,000 – Grass; Singles – Doubles	(United States) Andy Roddick; 6–3, 6–3	(France) Sébastien Grosjean	(United Kingdom) Tim Henman (United States) Andre Agassi	(Australia) Lleyton Hewitt (France) Antony Dupuis (United States) Taylor Dent (Belgium) Xavier Malisse
9 Jun	2003 Stella Artois Championships; Queen's Club, London, UK; ATP International Series $800,000 – Grass; Singles – Doubles	(The Bahamas) Mark Knowles (Canada) Daniel Nestor; 5–7, 6–4, 7–6^{(7–3)}	(India) Mahesh Bhupathi (Belarus) Max Mirnyi	(United Kingdom) Tim Henman (United States) Andre Agassi	(Australia) Lleyton Hewitt (France) Antony Dupuis (United States) Taylor Dent (Belgium) Xavier Malisse
16 Jun	2003 Ordina Open 's-Hertogenbosch, Netherlands; ATP International Series $380,000 – Grass; Singles – Doubles	(Netherlands) Sjeng Schalken; 6–3, 6–4	(France) Arnaud Clément	(Czech Republic) Jan Vacek (Netherlands) Raemon Sluiter	(Czech Republic) Jiří Novák (Spain) Fernando Vicente (Spain) Tommy Robredo (Netherlands) John van Lottum
16 Jun	2003 Ordina Open 's-Hertogenbosch, Netherlands; ATP International Series $380,000 – Grass; Singles – Doubles	(Czech Republic) Martin Damm (Czech Republic) Cyril Suk; 7–5, 7–6^{(7–4)}	(United States) Johnson (India) Leander Paes	(Czech Republic) Jan Vacek (Netherlands) Raemon Sluiter	(Czech Republic) Jiří Novák (Spain) Fernando Vicente (Spain) Tommy Robredo (Netherlands) John van Lottum
16 Jun	2003 Samsung Open; Nottingham, UK; ATP International Series $380,000 – Grass; Singles – Doubles	(United Kingdom) Greg Rusedski; 6–3, 6–2	(United States) Mardy Fish	(Morocco) Hicham Arazi (Sweden) Jonas Björkman	(Australia) Wayne Arthurs (Belarus) Vladimir Voltchkov (Germany) Alexander Popp (United States) Taylor Dent
16 Jun	2003 Samsung Open; Nottingham, UK; ATP International Series $380,000 – Grass; Singles – Doubles	(United States) Bob Bryan (United States) Mike Bryan; 7–6^{(7–3)}, 4–6, 7–6^{(7–4)}	(Australia) Joshua Eagle (United States) Jared Palmer	(Morocco) Hicham Arazi (Sweden) Jonas Björkman	(Australia) Wayne Arthurs (Belarus) Vladimir Voltchkov (Germany) Alexander Popp (United States) Taylor Dent
23 Jun; 30 Jun	2003 Wimbledon Championships; Wimbledon, London, UK; Grand Slam $7,229,233 – Grass – 128S/64D/64XD; Singles – Doubles – Mixed doubles	(Switzerland) Roger Federer; 7–6^{(7–5)}, 6–2, 7–6^{(7–3)}	(Australia) Mark Philippoussis	(United States) Andy Roddick (France) Sébastien Grosjean	(Sweden) Jonas Björkman (Netherlands) Sjeng Schalken (United Kingdom) Tim Henman (Germany) Alexander Popp
23 Jun; 30 Jun	2003 Wimbledon Championships; Wimbledon, London, UK; Grand Slam $7,229,233 – Grass – 128S/64D/64XD; Singles – Doubles – Mixed doubles	(Sweden) Jonas Björkman (Australia) Todd Woodbridge; 3–6, 6–3, 7–6^{(7–4)}, 6–3	(India) Mahesh Bhupathi (Belarus) Max Mirnyi	(United States) Andy Roddick (France) Sébastien Grosjean	(Sweden) Jonas Björkman (Netherlands) Sjeng Schalken (United Kingdom) Tim Henman (Germany) Alexander Popp
23 Jun; 30 Jun	2003 Wimbledon Championships; Wimbledon, London, UK; Grand Slam $7,229,233 – Grass – 128S/64D/64XD; Singles – Doubles – Mixed doubles	(India) Leander Paes (United States) Martina Navratilova; 6–3, 6–3	(Israel) Andy Ram (Russia) Anastassia Rodionova	(United States) Andy Roddick (France) Sébastien Grosjean	(Sweden) Jonas Björkman (Netherlands) Sjeng Schalken (United Kingdom) Tim Henman (Germany) Alexander Popp

=== July ===
Week	Tournament	Champions	Runners-up	Semifinalists	Quarterfinalists
7 Jul	2003 Synsam Swedish Open; Båstad, Sweden; ATP International Series $380,000 – Clay; Singles – Doubles	(Argentina) Mariano Zabaleta; 6–3, 6–4	(Ecuador) Nicolás Lapentti	(Spain) Carlos Moyà (Spain) Tommy Robredo	(Sweden) Jonas Björkman (Russia) Mikhail Youzhny (Spain) Rafael Nadal (Italy) Filippo Volandri
7 Jul	2003 Synsam Swedish Open; Båstad, Sweden; ATP International Series $380,000 – Clay; Singles – Doubles	(Sweden) Simon Aspelin (Italy) Massimo Bertolini; 6–7^{(3–7)}, 6–0, 6–4	(Argentina) Lucas Arnold Ker (Argentina) Mariano Hood	(Spain) Carlos Moyà (Spain) Tommy Robredo	(Sweden) Jonas Björkman (Russia) Mikhail Youzhny (Spain) Rafael Nadal (Italy) Filippo Volandri
7 Jul	2003 Allianz Suisse Open Gstaad; Gstaad, Switzerland; ATP International Series $550,000 – Clay; Singles – Doubles	(Czech Republic) Jiří Novák; 5–7, 6–3, 6–3, 1–6, 6–3	(Switzerland) Roger Federer	(Argentina) Gastón Gaudio (Czech Republic) Radek Štěpánek	(Spain) David Sánchez (Austria) Stefan Koubek (Argentina) Juan Ignacio Chela (Germany) Rainer Schüttler
7 Jul	2003 Allianz Suisse Open Gstaad; Gstaad, Switzerland; ATP International Series $550,000 – Clay; Singles – Doubles	(India) Leander Paes (Czech Republic) David Rikl; 6–3, 6–3	(Czech Republic) František Čermák (Czech Republic) Leoš Friedl	(Argentina) Gastón Gaudio (Czech Republic) Radek Štěpánek	(Spain) David Sánchez (Austria) Stefan Koubek (Argentina) Juan Ignacio Chela (Germany) Rainer Schüttler
7 Jul	2003 Miller Lite Hall of Fame Tennis Championships; Newport, US; ATP International Series $380,000 – Grass; Singles – Doubles	(United States) Robby Ginepri; 6–4, 6–7^{(3–7)}, 6–1	(Austria) Jürgen Melzer	(France) Gregory Carraz (United States) Bob Bryan	(United States) Justin Gimelstob (Peru) Iván Miranda (France) Cyril Saulnier (United States) Jeff Salzenstein
7 Jul	2003 Miller Lite Hall of Fame Tennis Championships; Newport, US; ATP International Series $380,000 – Grass; Singles – Doubles	(Australia) Jordan Kerr (Australia) David MacPherson; 7–6^{(7–4)}, 6–3	(Austria) Julian Knowle (Austria) Jürgen Melzer	(France) Gregory Carraz (United States) Bob Bryan	(United States) Justin Gimelstob (Peru) Iván Miranda (France) Cyril Saulnier (United States) Jeff Salzenstein
14 Jul	2003 Mercedes Cup; Stuttgart, Germany; ATP International Series Gold $765,000 – Clay; Singles – Doubles	(Argentina) Guillermo Coria; 6–2, 6–2, 6–1	(Spain) Tommy Robredo	(Chile) Fernando González (Spain) Feliciano López	(Germany) Tomas Behrend (Italy) Filippo Volandri (Germany) Rainer Schüttler (Russia) Mikhail Youzhny
14 Jul	2003 Mercedes Cup; Stuttgart, Germany; ATP International Series Gold $765,000 – Clay; Singles – Doubles	(Czech Republic) Tomáš Cibulec (Czech Republic) Pavel Vízner; 3–6, 6–3, 6–4	(Russia) Yevgeny Kafelnikov (Zimbabwe) Kevin Ullyett	(Chile) Fernando González (Spain) Feliciano López	(Germany) Tomas Behrend (Italy) Filippo Volandri (Germany) Rainer Schüttler (Russia) Mikhail Youzhny
14 Jul	2003 Priority Telecom Dutch Open; Amersfoort, Netherlands; ATP International Series $380,000 – Clay; Singles – Doubles	(Chile) Nicolás Massú; 6–4, 7–6^{(7–3)}, 6–2	(Netherlands) Raemon Sluiter	(Spain) Albert Montañés (Peru) Luis Horna	(Austria) Markus Hipfl (Spain) Rubén Ramírez Hidalgo (Netherlands) Dennis van Scheppingen (Spain) Óscar Hernández
14 Jul	2003 Priority Telecom Dutch Open; Amersfoort, Netherlands; ATP International Series $380,000 – Clay; Singles – Doubles	(United States) Devin Bowen (Australia) Ashley Fisher; 6–0, 6–4	(South Africa) Chris Haggard (Brazil) André Sá	(Spain) Albert Montañés (Peru) Luis Horna	(Austria) Markus Hipfl (Spain) Rubén Ramírez Hidalgo (Netherlands) Dennis van Scheppingen (Spain) Óscar Hernández
21 Jul	2003 Generali Open; Kitzbühel, Austria; ATP International Series Gold $925,000 – Clay; Singles – Doubles	(Argentina) Guillermo Coria; 6–1, 6–4, 6–2	(Chile) Nicolás Massú	(Argentina) Mariano Zabaleta (Spain) Feliciano López	(Spain) Juan Carlos Ferrero (Ecuador) Nicolás Lapentti (Argentina) Gastón Gaudio (Argentina) Juan Ignacio Chela
21 Jul	2003 Generali Open; Kitzbühel, Austria; ATP International Series Gold $925,000 – Clay; Singles – Doubles	(Czech Republic) Martin Damm (Czech Republic) Cyril Suk; 6–4, 6–4	(Austria) Jürgen Melzer (Austria) Alexander Peya	(Argentina) Mariano Zabaleta (Spain) Feliciano López	(Spain) Juan Carlos Ferrero (Ecuador) Nicolás Lapentti (Argentina) Gastón Gaudio (Argentina) Juan Ignacio Chela
21 Jul	2003 RCA Championships; Indianapolis, US; ATP International Series $600,000 – Hard; Singles – Doubles	(United States) Andy Roddick; 7–6^{(7–2)}, 6–4	(Thailand) Paradorn Srichaphan	(Netherlands) Sjeng Schalken (France) Nicolas Thomann	(Belgium) Xavier Malisse (United States) Robby Ginepri (Germany) Nicolas Kiefer (Australia) Scott Draper
21 Jul	2003 RCA Championships; Indianapolis, US; ATP International Series $600,000 – Hard; Singles – Doubles	(Croatia) Mario Ančić (Israel) Andy Ram; 2–6, 7–6^{(7–3)}, 7–5	(United States) Diego Ayala (United States) Robby Ginepri	(Netherlands) Sjeng Schalken (France) Nicolas Thomann	(Belgium) Xavier Malisse (United States) Robby Ginepri (Germany) Nicolas Kiefer (Australia) Scott Draper
21 Jul	2003 Croatia Open; Umag, Croatia; ATP International Series $400,000 – Clay; Singles – Doubles	(Spain) Carlos Moyà; 6–4, 3–6, 7–5	(Italy) Filippo Volandri	(Spain) Rafael Nadal (Slovakia) Dominik Hrbatý	(Spain) David Ferrer (Sweden) Magnus Norman (Spain) Alberto Martín (Chile) Fernando González
21 Jul	2003 Croatia Open; Umag, Croatia; ATP International Series $400,000 – Clay; Singles – Doubles	(Spain) Álex López Morón (Spain) Rafael Nadal; 6–3, 6–1	(Australia) Todd Perry (Japan) Thomas Shimada	(Spain) Rafael Nadal (Slovakia) Dominik Hrbatý	(Spain) David Ferrer (Sweden) Magnus Norman (Spain) Alberto Martín (Chile) Fernando González
28 Jul	2003 Mercedes-Benz Cup; Los Angeles, USA; ATP International Series $380,000 – Hard; Singles – Doubles	(South Africa) Wayne Ferreira; 6–3, 4–6, 7–5	(Australia) Lleyton Hewitt	(Germany) Nicolas Kiefer (Australia) Mark Philippoussis	(Denmark) Kenneth Carlsen (United States) Vincent Spadea (Brazil) Gustavo Kuerten (France) Sébastien Grosjean
28 Jul	2003 Mercedes-Benz Cup; Los Angeles, USA; ATP International Series $380,000 – Hard; Singles – Doubles	(United States) Jan-Michael Gambill (United States) Travis Parrott; 6–4, 3–6, 7–5	(Australia) Joshua Eagle (Netherlands) Sjeng Schalken	(Germany) Nicolas Kiefer (Australia) Mark Philippoussis	(Denmark) Kenneth Carlsen (United States) Vincent Spadea (Brazil) Gustavo Kuerten (France) Sébastien Grosjean
28 Jul	2003 Idea Prokom Open; Sopot, Poland; ATP International Series $500,000 – Clay; Singles – Doubles	(Argentina) Guillermo Coria; 7–5, 6–1	(Spain) David Ferrer	(Peru) Luis Horna (Spain) Rubén Ramírez Hidalgo	(Spain) Juan Carlos Ferrero (France) Olivier Mutis (Sweden) Andreas Vinciguerra (Spain) Galo Blanco
28 Jul	2003 Idea Prokom Open; Sopot, Poland; ATP International Series $500,000 – Clay; Singles – Doubles	(Poland) Mariusz Fyrstenberg (Poland) Marcin Matkowski; 6–4, 6–7^{(7–9)}, 6–3	(Czech Republic) František Čermák (Czech Republic) Leoš Friedl	(Peru) Luis Horna (Spain) Rubén Ramírez Hidalgo	(Spain) Juan Carlos Ferrero (France) Olivier Mutis (Sweden) Andreas Vinciguerra (Spain) Galo Blanco
28 Jul	2003 Legg Mason Tennis Classic; Washington, D.C., USA; ATP International Series $600,000 – Hard; Singles – Doubles	(United Kingdom) Tim Henman; 6–3, 6–4	(Chile) Fernando González	(United States) Andre Agassi (United States) Andy Roddick	(United States) James Blake (Belarus) Max Mirnyi (Thailand) Paradorn Srichaphan (United States) Mardy Fish
28 Jul	2003 Legg Mason Tennis Classic; Washington, D.C., USA; ATP International Series $600,000 – Hard; Singles – Doubles	(Russia) Yevgeny Kafelnikov (Armenia) Sargis Sargsian; 7–5, 4–6, 6–2	(South Africa) Chris Haggard (Australia) Paul Hanley	(United States) Andre Agassi (United States) Andy Roddick	(United States) James Blake (Belarus) Max Mirnyi (Thailand) Paradorn Srichaphan (United States) Mardy Fish

=== August ===
Week	Tournament	Champions	Runners-up	Semifinalists	Quarterfinalists
4 Aug	2003 Canada Masters; Montreal, Canada; Tennis Masters Series $2,200,000 – Hard; Singles – Doubles	(United States) Andy Roddick; 6–1, 6–3	(Argentina) David Nalbandian	(Germany) Rainer Schüttler (Switzerland) Roger Federer	(United States) Andre Agassi (Spain) Feliciano López (Belarus) Max Mirnyi (Slovakia) Karol Kučera
4 Aug	2003 Canada Masters; Montreal, Canada; Tennis Masters Series $2,200,000 – Hard; Singles – Doubles	(India) Mahesh Bhupathi (Belarus) Max Mirnyi; 6–3, 7–6^{(7–4)}	(Sweden) Jonas Björkman (Australia) Todd Woodbridge	(Germany) Rainer Schüttler (Switzerland) Roger Federer	(United States) Andre Agassi (Spain) Feliciano López (Belarus) Max Mirnyi (Slovakia) Karol Kučera
11 Aug	2003 Western & Southern Financial Group Masters; Mason, US; Tennis Masters Series $2,200,000 – Hard; Singles – Doubles	(United States) Andy Roddick; 4–6, 7–6^{(7–3)}, 7–6^{(7–4)}	(United States) Mardy Fish	(Belarus) Max Mirnyi (Germany) Rainer Schüttler	(Argentina) Guillermo Coria (Argentina) Mariano Zabaleta (Argentina) David Nalbandian (United States) Robby Ginepri
11 Aug	2003 Western & Southern Financial Group Masters; Mason, US; Tennis Masters Series $2,200,000 – Hard; Singles – Doubles	(United States) Bob Bryan (United States) Mike Bryan; 7–5, 7–6^{(7–5)}	(Australia) Wayne Arthurs (Australia) Paul Hanley	(Belarus) Max Mirnyi (Germany) Rainer Schüttler	(Argentina) Guillermo Coria (Argentina) Mariano Zabaleta (Argentina) David Nalbandian (United States) Robby Ginepri
18 Aug	2003 TD Waterhouse Cup; Long Island, US; ATP International Series $380,000 – Hard; Singles – Doubles	(Thailand) Paradorn Srichaphan; 6–2, 6–4	(United States) James Blake	(Germany) Nicolas Kiefer (Morocco) Younes El Aynaoui	(United States) Jeff Morrison (Argentina) Juan Ignacio Chela (Finland) Jarkko Nieminen (Brazil) Gustavo Kuerten
18 Aug	2003 TD Waterhouse Cup; Long Island, US; ATP International Series $380,000 – Hard; Singles – Doubles	(South Africa) Robbie Koenig (Argentina) Martín Rodríguez; 6–3, 7–6^{(7–4)}	(Czech Republic) Martin Damm (Czech Republic) Cyril Suk	(Germany) Nicolas Kiefer (Morocco) Younes El Aynaoui	(United States) Jeff Morrison (Argentina) Juan Ignacio Chela (Finland) Jarkko Nieminen (Brazil) Gustavo Kuerten
25 Aug; 1 Sep	2003 US Open; Flushing, New York, United States; Grand Slam $7,129,000 – Hard – 128S/64D/32XD; Singles – Doubles – Mixed doubles	(United States) Andy Roddick; 6–3, 7–6^{(7–2)}, 6–3	(Spain) Juan Carlos Ferrero	(United States) Andre Agassi (Argentina) David Nalbandian	(Argentina) Guillermo Coria (Australia) Lleyton Hewitt (Netherlands) Sjeng Schalken (Morocco) Younes El Aynaoui
25 Aug; 1 Sep	2003 US Open; Flushing, New York, United States; Grand Slam $7,129,000 – Hard – 128S/64D/32XD; Singles – Doubles – Mixed doubles	(Sweden) Jonas Björkman (Australia) Todd Woodbridge; 5–7, 6–0, 7–5	(United States) Bob Bryan (United States) Mike Bryan	(United States) Andre Agassi (Argentina) David Nalbandian	(Argentina) Guillermo Coria (Australia) Lleyton Hewitt (Netherlands) Sjeng Schalken (Morocco) Younes El Aynaoui
25 Aug; 1 Sep	2003 US Open; Flushing, New York, United States; Grand Slam $7,129,000 – Hard – 128S/64D/32XD; Singles – Doubles – Mixed doubles	(United States) Bob Bryan (Slovenia) Katarina Srebotnik; 5–7, 7–5, 7–6^{(7–5)}	(Canada) Daniel Nestor (Russia) Lina Krasnoroutskaya	(United States) Andre Agassi (Argentina) David Nalbandian	(Argentina) Guillermo Coria (Australia) Lleyton Hewitt (Netherlands) Sjeng Schalken (Morocco) Younes El Aynaoui

=== September ===
Week	Tournament	Champions	Runners-up	Semifinalists	Quarterfinalists
8 Sep	2003 BCR Open Romania; Bucharest, Romania; ATP International Series $380,000 – Clay; Singles – Doubles	(Spain) David Sánchez; 6–2, 6–2	(Chile) Nicolás Massú	(Argentina) José Acasuso (Romania) Răzvan Sabău	(Netherlands) John van Lottum (France) Paul-Henri Mathieu (Armenia) Sargis Sargsian (Romania) Victor Hănescu
8 Sep	2003 BCR Open Romania; Bucharest, Romania; ATP International Series $380,000 – Clay; Singles – Doubles	(Germany) Karsten Braasch (Armenia) Sargis Sargsian; 7–6^{(9–7)}, 6–2	(Sweden) Simon Aspelin (South Africa) Jeff Coetzee	(Argentina) José Acasuso (Romania) Răzvan Sabău	(Netherlands) John van Lottum (France) Paul-Henri Mathieu (Armenia) Sargis Sargsian (Romania) Victor Hănescu
8 Sep	2003 Brasil Open; Costa do Sauipe, Brazil; ATP International Series $380,000 – Hard; Singles – Doubles	(Netherlands) Sjeng Schalken; 6–2, 6–4	(Germany) Rainer Schüttler	(Brazil) Gustavo Kuerten (Argentina) Gastón Etlis	(Paraguay) Ramón Delgado (Brazil) Ricardo Mello (Denmark) Kenneth Carlsen (United States) Vincent Spadea
8 Sep	2003 Brasil Open; Costa do Sauipe, Brazil; ATP International Series $380,000 – Hard; Singles – Doubles	(Australia) Todd Perry (Japan) Thomas Shimada; 6–2, 6–4	(United States) Scott Humphries (The Bahamas) Mark Merklein	(Brazil) Gustavo Kuerten (Argentina) Gastón Etlis	(Paraguay) Ramón Delgado (Brazil) Ricardo Mello (Denmark) Kenneth Carlsen (United States) Vincent Spadea
15 Sep	Davis Cup by BNP Paribas Semifinals; Melbourne, Australia – Hard; Málaga, Spain – Clay	Semifinal winners Australia 3–2; Spain 3–2	Semifinal losers Switzerland; Argentina		
22 Sep	2003 Thailand Open; Bangkok, Thailand; ATP International Series $550,000 – Hard; Singles – Doubles	(United States) Taylor Dent; 6–3, 7–6^{(7–5)}	(Spain) Juan Carlos Ferrero	(Croatia) Ivan Ljubičić (Finland) Jarkko Nieminen	(France) Gregory Carraz (Thailand) Paradorn Srichaphan (Spain) Carlos Moyà (France) Nicolas Thomann
22 Sep	2003 Thailand Open; Bangkok, Thailand; ATP International Series $550,000 – Hard; Singles – Doubles	(Israel) Jonathan Erlich (Israel) Andy Ram; 6–3, 7–6^{(7–4)}	(Australia) Andrew Kratzmann (Finland) Jarkko Nieminen	(Croatia) Ivan Ljubičić (Finland) Jarkko Nieminen	(France) Gregory Carraz (Thailand) Paradorn Srichaphan (Spain) Carlos Moyà (France) Nicolas Thomann
22 Sep	2003 Campionati Internazionali di Sicilia; Palermo, Italy; ATP International Series $380,000 – Clay; Singles – Doubles	(Chile) Nicolás Massú; 1–6, 6–2, 7–6(0)	(France) Paul-Henri Mathieu	(Peru) Luis Horna (Spain) Alberto Martín	(Spain) Albert Montañés (Spain) Óscar Hernández (Argentina) Franco Squillari (Argentina) Diego Veronelli
22 Sep	2003 Campionati Internazionali di Sicilia; Palermo, Italy; ATP International Series $380,000 – Clay; Singles – Doubles	(Argentina) Lucas Arnold Ker (Argentina) Mariano Hood; 7–6^{(8–6)}, 6–7^{(3–7)}, 6–3	(Czech Republic) František Čermák (Czech Republic) Leoš Friedl	(Peru) Luis Horna (Spain) Alberto Martín	(Spain) Albert Montañés (Spain) Óscar Hernández (Argentina) Franco Squillari (Argentina) Diego Veronelli
22 Sep	2003 Heineken Open Shanghai; Shanghai, China; ATP International Series $380,000 – Hard; Singles – Doubles	(Australia) Mark Philippoussis; 6–2, 6–1	(Czech Republic) Jiří Novák	(Australia) Wayne Arthurs (Sweden) Robin Söderling	(Sweden) Magnus Norman (Croatia) Ivo Karlović (Argentina) Guillermo Cañas (Australia) Scott Draper
22 Sep	2003 Heineken Open Shanghai; Shanghai, China; ATP International Series $380,000 – Hard; Singles – Doubles	(Australia) Wayne Arthurs (Australia) Paul Hanley; 6–2, 6–4	(China) Zeng Shaoxuan (China) Zhu Benqiang	(Australia) Wayne Arthurs (Sweden) Robin Söderling	(Sweden) Magnus Norman (Croatia) Ivo Karlović (Argentina) Guillermo Cañas (Australia) Scott Draper
29 Sep	2003 AIG Japan Open Tennis Championships; Tokyo, Japan; ATP International Series Gold $690,000 – Hard; Singles – Doubles	(Germany) Rainer Schüttler; 7–6^{(7–5)}, 6–2	(France) Sébastien Grosjean	(France) Cyril Saulnier (Thailand) Paradorn Srichaphan	(Australia) Scott Draper (Australia) Mark Philippoussis (South Korea) Hyung-Taik Lee (United States) Jan-Michael Gambill
29 Sep	2003 AIG Japan Open Tennis Championships; Tokyo, Japan; ATP International Series Gold $690,000 – Hard; Singles – Doubles	(United States) Justin Gimelstob (Germany) Nicolas Kiefer; 6–7^{(6–8)}, 6–3, 7–6^{(7–4)}	(United States) Scott Humphries (The Bahamas) Mark Merklein	(France) Cyril Saulnier (Thailand) Paradorn Srichaphan	(Australia) Scott Draper (Australia) Mark Philippoussis (South Korea) Hyung-Taik Lee (United States) Jan-Michael Gambill
29 Sep	2003 Open de Moselle; Metz, France; ATP International Series $380,000 – Hard (i); Singles – Doubles	(France) Arnaud Clément; 6–3, 1–6, 6–3	(Chile) Fernando González	(Romania) Andrei Pavel (France) Fabrice Santoro	(Spain) Tommy Robredo (Spain) David Ferrer (Germany) Philipp Petzschner (Germany) Alexander Popp
29 Sep	2003 Open de Moselle; Metz, France; ATP International Series $380,000 – Hard (i); Singles – Doubles	(France) Julien Benneteau (France) Nicolas Mahut; 7–6^{(7–2)}, 6–3	(France) Michaël Llodra (France) Fabrice Santoro	(Romania) Andrei Pavel (France) Fabrice Santoro	(Spain) Tommy Robredo (Spain) David Ferrer (Germany) Philipp Petzschner (Germany) Alexander Popp
29 Sep	2003 Kremlin Cup; Moscow, Russia; ATP International Series $1,000,000 – Carpet (i); Singles – Doubles	(United States) Taylor Dent; 7–6^{(7–5)}, 6–4	(Armenia) Sargis Sargsian	(France) Paul-Henri Mathieu (United States) Vincent Spadea	(Russia) Igor Andreev (Switzerland) Marc Rosset (Austria) Stefan Koubek (Argentina) Agustín Calleri
29 Sep	2003 Kremlin Cup; Moscow, Russia; ATP International Series $1,000,000 – Carpet (i); Singles – Doubles	(India) Mahesh Bhupathi (Belarus) Max Mirnyi; 6–3, 7–5	(Zimbabwe) Wayne Black (Zimbabwe) Kevin Ullyett	(France) Paul-Henri Mathieu (United States) Vincent Spadea	(Russia) Igor Andreev (Switzerland) Marc Rosset (Austria) Stefan Koubek (Argentina) Agustín Calleri

=== October ===
Week	Tournament	Champions	Runners-up	Semifinalists	Quarterfinalists
6 Oct	2003 CA Tennis Trophy; Vienna, Austria; ATP International Series Gold $765,000 – Hard (i); Singles – Doubles	(Switzerland) Roger Federer; 6–3, 6–3, 6–3	(Spain) Carlos Moyà	(Belarus) Max Mirnyi (United Kingdom) Tim Henman	(Finland) Jarkko Nieminen (Spain) Feliciano López (Sweden) Jonas Björkman (Germany) Nicolas Kiefer
6 Oct	2003 CA Tennis Trophy; Vienna, Austria; ATP International Series Gold $765,000 – Hard (i); Singles – Doubles	(Switzerland) Yves Allegro (Switzerland) Roger Federer; 7–6^{(9–7)}, 7–5	(India) Mahesh Bhupathi (Belarus) Max Mirnyi	(Belarus) Max Mirnyi (United Kingdom) Tim Henman	(Finland) Jarkko Nieminen (Spain) Feliciano López (Sweden) Jonas Björkman (Germany) Nicolas Kiefer
6 Oct	2003 Grand Prix de Tennis de Lyon; Lyon, France; ATP International Series $800,000 – Carpet (i); Singles – Doubles	(Germany) Rainer Schüttler; 7–5, 6–3	(France) Arnaud Clément	(Russia) Mikhail Youzhny (Thailand) Paradorn Srichaphan	(Belgium) Xavier Malisse (United States) Robby Ginepri (France) Fabrice Santoro (Morocco) Hicham Arazi
6 Oct	2003 Grand Prix de Tennis de Lyon; Lyon, France; ATP International Series $800,000 – Carpet (i); Singles – Doubles	(Israel) Jonathan Erlich (Israel) Andy Ram; 6–1, 6–3	(France) Julien Benneteau (France) Nicolas Mahut	(Russia) Mikhail Youzhny (Thailand) Paradorn Srichaphan	(Belgium) Xavier Malisse (United States) Robby Ginepri (France) Fabrice Santoro (Morocco) Hicham Arazi
13 Oct	2003 Madrid Masters; Madrid, Spain; Tennis Masters Series $2,200,000 – Hard (i); Singles – Doubles	(Spain) Juan Carlos Ferrero; 6–3, 6–4, 6–3	(Chile) Nicolás Massú	(Switzerland) Roger Federer (Morocco) Younes El Aynaoui	(Thailand) Paradorn Srichaphan (Spain) Feliciano López (France) Sébastien Grosjean (Argentina) Juan Ignacio Chela
13 Oct	2003 Madrid Masters; Madrid, Spain; Tennis Masters Series $2,200,000 – Hard (i); Singles – Doubles	(India) Mahesh Bhupathi (Belarus) Max Mirnyi; 6–2, 2–6, 6–3	(Zimbabwe) Wayne Black (Zimbabwe) Kevin Ullyett	(Switzerland) Roger Federer (Morocco) Younes El Aynaoui	(Thailand) Paradorn Srichaphan (Spain) Feliciano López (France) Sébastien Grosjean (Argentina) Juan Ignacio Chela
20 Oct	2003 Davidoff Swiss Indoors; Basel, Switzerland; ATP International Series $1,000,000 – Carpet (i); Singles – Doubles	(Argentina) Guillermo Coria; W/O	(Argentina) David Nalbandian	(United States) Andy Roddick (Croatia) Ivan Ljubičić	(Belgium) Olivier Rochus (United Kingdom) Tim Henman (Spain) Feliciano López (Ecuador) Nicolás Lapentti
20 Oct	2003 Davidoff Swiss Indoors; Basel, Switzerland; ATP International Series $1,000,000 – Carpet (i); Singles – Doubles	(The Bahamas) Mark Knowles (Canada) Daniel Nestor; 6–4, 6–2	(Argentina) Lucas Arnold Ker (Argentina) Mariano Hood	(United States) Andy Roddick (Croatia) Ivan Ljubičić	(Belgium) Olivier Rochus (United Kingdom) Tim Henman (Spain) Feliciano López (Ecuador) Nicolás Lapentti
20 Oct	2003 St. Petersburg Open; St. Petersburg, Russia; ATP International Series $1,000,000 – Carpet (i); Singles – Doubles	(Brazil) Gustavo Kuerten; 6–4, 6–3	(Armenia) Sargis Sargsian	(Germany) Rainer Schüttler (Spain) Àlex Corretja	(Russia) Mikhail Youzhny (Germany) Lars Burgsmüller (United States) Vincent Spadea (France) Sébastien Grosjean
20 Oct	2003 St. Petersburg Open; St. Petersburg, Russia; ATP International Series $1,000,000 – Carpet (i); Singles – Doubles	(Austria) Julian Knowle (Serbia and Montenegro) Nenad Zimonjić; 7–6^{(7–1)}, 6–3	(Germany) Michael Kohlmann (Germany) Rainer Schüttler	(Germany) Rainer Schüttler (Spain) Àlex Corretja	(Russia) Mikhail Youzhny (Germany) Lars Burgsmüller (United States) Vincent Spadea (France) Sébastien Grosjean
20 Oct	2003 If Stockholm Open; Stockholm, Sweden; ATP International Series $650,000 – Hard (i); Singles – Doubles	(United States) Mardy Fish; 7–5, 3–6, 7–6^{(7–4)}	(Sweden) Robin Söderling	(Italy) Davide Sanguinetti (Sweden) Thomas Enqvist	(Sweden) Jonas Björkman (Sweden) Joachim Johansson (Croatia) Mario Ančić (United States) Robby Ginepri
20 Oct	2003 If Stockholm Open; Stockholm, Sweden; ATP International Series $650,000 – Hard (i); Singles – Doubles	(Sweden) Jonas Björkman (Australia) Todd Woodbridge; 6–3, 6–4	(Australia) Wayne Arthurs (Australia) Paul Hanley	(Italy) Davide Sanguinetti (Sweden) Thomas Enqvist	(Sweden) Jonas Björkman (Sweden) Joachim Johansson (Croatia) Mario Ančić (United States) Robby Ginepri
27 Oct	2003 BNP Paribas Masters; Paris, France; Tennis Masters Series $2,200,000 – Carpet (i); Singles – Doubles	(United Kingdom) Tim Henman; 6–2, 7–6^{(8–6)}, 7–6^{(7–2)}	(Romania) Andrei Pavel	(Czech Republic) Jiří Novák (United States) Andy Roddick	(Morocco) Hicham Arazi (Germany) Rainer Schüttler (Switzerland) Roger Federer (Sweden) Jonas Björkman
27 Oct	2003 BNP Paribas Masters; Paris, France; Tennis Masters Series $2,200,000 – Carpet (i); Singles – Doubles	(Australia) Wayne Arthurs (Australia) Paul Hanley; 6–3, 1–6, 6–3	(France) Michaël Llodra (France) Fabrice Santoro	(Czech Republic) Jiří Novák (United States) Andy Roddick	(Morocco) Hicham Arazi (Germany) Rainer Schüttler (Switzerland) Roger Federer (Sweden) Jonas Björkman

=== November ===
Week	Tournament	Champions	Runners-up	Semifinalists	Round robin
10 Nov	2003 Tennis Masters Cup; Houston, US; Tennis Masters Cup $4,450,000 – Hard; Singles – Doubles	(Switzerland) Roger Federer; 6–3, 6–0, 6–4	(United States) Andre Agassi	(Germany) Rainer Schüttler (United States) Andy Roddick	(Argentina) Guillermo Coria (Spain) Carlos Moyà (Argentina) David Nalbandian (Spain) Juan Carlos Ferrero
10 Nov	2003 Tennis Masters Cup; Houston, US; Tennis Masters Cup $4,450,000 – Hard; Singles – Doubles	(United States) Bob Bryan (United States) Mike Bryan; 6–7^{(6–8)}, 6–3, 3–6, 7–6^{(7–3)}, 6–4	(France) Michaël Llodra (France) Fabrice Santoro	(Germany) Rainer Schüttler (United States) Andy Roddick	(Argentina) Guillermo Coria (Spain) Carlos Moyà (Argentina) David Nalbandian (Spain) Juan Carlos Ferrero
24 Nov	Davis Cup by BNP Paribas Final; Melbourne, Australia – Grass	Australia 3–1	Spain		

== Statistical information ==
List of players and titles won (Grand Slam and Masters Cup titles in bold), listed in order of the number of titles won:

- (Switzerland) Roger Federer – Marseille, Dubai, Munich, Halle, **Wimbledon** , Vienna and **Masters Cup** (7)
- (United States) Andy Roddick – St. Poelten, London Queen's Club, Indianapolis, Canada Masters, Cincinnati Masters and **US Open** (6)
- (Argentina) Guillermo Coria – Hamburg Masters, Stuttgart, Kitzbühel, Sopot and Basel (5)
- (United States) Andre Agassi – **Australian Open**, San Jose, Miami Masters and Houston (4)
- (Spain) Juan Carlos Ferrero – Monte Carlos Masters, Valencia, **French Open** and Madrid Masters (4)
- (United States) Taylor Dent – Memphis, Bangkok and Moscow (3)
- (Spain) Carlos Moyà – Buenos Aires, Barcelona and Umag (3)
- (Russia) Nikolay Davydenko – Adelaide and Estoril (2)
- (United Kingdom) Tim Henman – Washington, D.C., and Paris Masters (2)
- (Australia) Lleyton Hewitt – Scottsdale and Indian Wells Masters (2)
- (Brazil) Gustavo Kuerten – Auckland and St. Petersburg (2)
- (Chile) Nicolás Massú – Amersfoort and Palermo (2)
- (Spain) David Sánchez – Viña del Mar and Bucharest (2)
- (Netherlands) Sjeng Schalken – 's-Hertogenbosch and Costa do Sauipe (2)
- (Germany) Rainer Schüttler – Tokyo and Lyon (2)
- (Thailand) Paradorn Srichaphan – Chennai and Long Island (2)
- (France) Julien Boutter – Casablanca (1)
- (Argentina) Agustín Calleri – Acapulco (1)
- (France) Arnaud Clément – Metz (1)
- (South Africa) Wayne Ferreira – Los Angeles (1)
- (United States) Mardy Fish – Stockholm (1)
- (United States) Jan-Michael Gambill – Delray Beach (1)
- (United States) Robby Ginepri – Newport (1)
- (Austria) Stefan Koubek – Doha (1)
- (Slovakia) Karol Kučera – Copenhagen (1)
- (South Korea) Hyung-Taik Lee – Sydney (1)
- (Spain) Félix Mantilla – Rome Masters (1)
- (Belarus) Max Mirnyi – Rotterdam (1)
- (Czech Republic) Jiří Novák – Gstaad (1)
- (Australia) Mark Philippoussis – Shanghai (1)
- (United Kingdom) Greg Rusedski – Nottingham (1)
- (Netherlands) Martin Verkerk – Milan (1)
- (Argentina) Mariano Zabaleta – Båstad (1)

The following players won their first title:

- (France) Julien Boutter – Casablanca
- (Argentina) Agustín Calleri – Acapulco
- (Russia) Nikolay Davydenko – Adelaide
- (United States) Mardy Fish – Stockholm
- (United States) Robby Ginepri – Newport
- (South Korea) Hyung-Taik Lee – Sydney
- (Belarus) Max Mirnyi – Rotterdam
- (Spain) David Sánchez – Viña del Mar
- (Netherlands) Martin Verkerk – Milan

Titles won by nation:

- United States 16 (**Australian Open**, San Jose, Memphis, Delray Beach, Miami Masters, Houston, St. Poelten, London Queen's Club, Newport, Indianapolis, Canada Masters, Cincinnati Masters, **US Open**, Bangkok, Moscow and Stockholm)
- Spain 10 (Viña del Mar, Buenos Aires, Monte Carlos Masters, Barcelona, Valencia, Rome Masters, **French Open**, Umag, Bucharest and Madrid Masters)
- Argentina 7 (Acapulco, Hamburg Masters, Båstad, Stuttgart, Kitzbühel, Sopot and Basel)
- Switzerland 7 (Marseille, Dubai, Munich, Halle, **Wimbledon** , Vienna and **Masters Cup**)
- Australia 3 (Scottsdale, Indian Wells Masters and Shanghai)
- Netherlands 3 (Milan, 's-Hertogenbosch and Costa do Sauipe)
- United Kingdom 3 (Nottingham; Washington, D.C., and Paris Masters)
- Brazil 2 (Auckland and St. Petersburg)
- Chile 2 (Amersfoort and Palermo)
- France 2 (Casablanca and Metz)
- Germany 2 (Tokyo and Lyon)
- Russia 2 (Adelaide and Estoril)
- Thailand 2 (Chennai and Long Island)
- Austria 1 (Doha)
- Belarus 1 (Rotterdam)
- Czech Republic 1 (Gstaad)
- Slovakia 1 (Copenhagen)
- South Africa 1 (Los Angeles)
- South Korea 1 (Sydney)

== ATP entry rankings ==
=== Singles ===
As of 30 December 2002
Rk	Name	Nation	Points
1	Lleyton Hewitt	AUS	4,485
2	Andre Agassi	USA	3,395
3	Marat Safin	RUS	2,845
4	Juan Carlos Ferrero	ESP	2,740
5	Carlos Moyà	ESP	2,630
6	Roger Federer	SUI	2,590
7	Jiří Novák	CZE	2,335
8	Tim Henman	GBR	2,215
9	Albert Costa	ESP	2,070
10	Andy Roddick	USA	2,045
11	Tommy Haas	GER	2,020
12	David Nalbandian	ARG	1,775
13	Pete Sampras	USA	1,735
14	Thomas Johansson	SWE	1,725
15	Guillermo Cañas	ARG	1,725
16	Paradorn Srichaphan	THA	1,646
17	Sébastien Grosjean	FRA	1,640
18	Fernando González	CHI	1,636
19	Àlex Corretja	ESP	1,555
20	Sjeng Schalken	NED	1,525

Year-end rankings 2003 (29 December 2003)
Rk	Name	Nation	Points	High	Low	Change
1	Andy Roddick	USA	4,535	1	10	▲9
2	Roger Federer	SUI	4,375	2	6	▲4
3	Juan Carlos Ferrero	ESP	4,205	1	4	▲1
4	Andre Agassi	USA	3,425	1	5	▼2
5	Guillermo Coria	ARG	3,330	4	45	▲40
6	Rainer Schüttler	GER	3,205	6	38	▲27
7	Carlos Moyà	ESP	2,280	4	7	▼2
8	David Nalbandian	ARG	2,060	8	21	▲4
9	Mark Philippoussis	AUS	1,615	9	104	▲71
10	Sébastien Grosjean	FRA	1,610	9	20	▲7
11	Paradorn Srichaphan	THA	1,595	9	16	▲5
12	Nicolás Massú	CHI	1,559	12	105	▲44
13	Jiří Novák	CZE	1,510	7	18	▼6
14	Younes El Aynaoui	MAR	1,480	14	26	▲8
15	Tim Henman	GBR	1,480	8	40	▼7
16	Gustavo Kuerten	BRA	1,470	13	37	▲21
17	Lleyton Hewitt	AUS	1,450	1	18	▼16
18	Sjeng Schalken	NED	1,445	11	20	▲2
19	Martin Verkerk	NED	1,425	14	90	▲67
20	Mardy Fish	USA	1,300	19	84	▲64

== Retirements ==
Following is a list of notable players (winners of a main tour title, and/or part of the ATP rankings top 100 (singles) or top 50 (doubles) for at least one week) who announced their retirement from professional tennis, became inactive (after not playing for more than 52 weeks), or were permanently banned from playing, during the 2003 season:

- Michael Chang (born February 22, 1972, in Hoboken, New Jersey) He turned professional in 1988 and reached a career-high ranking of world no. 2. He won the French Open in 1989 and was a finalist at the Australian Open and the US Open, as well as the year-end finals. In all, he won 34 career titles. He played his final career match at the US Open against Fernando González.
- Francisco Clavet (born October 24, 1968, in Aranjuez, Spain) He turned professional in 1988 and reached his career-high ranking of no. 18 in 1992. He earned eight singles titles and played his last match in Segovia in July against Nicolas Mahut.
- Fernando Meligeni (born April 12, 1971, in Buenos Aires, Argentina) He turned professional in 1990 and reached his career-high ranking of no. 25 in 1999. He reached the semifinals of the French Open in 1999 and earned three career singles titles. In doubles, he was ranked no. 34 in 1997 and earned seven career titles.
- Andrea Gaudenzi (born 30 July 1973 in Faenza, Italy) He turned professional in 1990 and reached his career-high ranking of world no. 18 in 1995. He earned three career singles titles and two doubles titles. His last match was in San Marino in August against Federico Browne.
- Paul Haarhuis (born 19 February 1966 in Eindhoven, Netherlands) He turned professional in 1989 and reached a career-high ranking of world no. 18. He reached the quarterfinals at the US Open and earned one career singles title. In doubles, he was ranked world no. 1 in 1994 and won all four Grand Slam tournaments, the French open three times. He played his last career match at Wimbledon partnering Yevgeny Kafelnikov.
- Yevgeny Kafelnikov (born 18 February 1974 in Sochi, Soviet Union) He turned professional in 1992 and reached the world no. 1 ranking in 1999. He won two Grand Slam singles titles, the 1996 French Open and the 1999 Australian Open. He also won four Grand Slam doubles titles, and the men's singles gold medal at the Sydney Olympic Games in 2000. He also helped Russia win the Davis Cup in 2002. He is the last man to have won both the men's singles and doubles titles at the same Grand Slam tournament, the 1996 French Open. He played his last match in St. Petersburg in October against Mikhail Youzhny.
- Richard Krajicek (born 6 December 1971 in Rotterdam, Netherlands) He turned professional in 1989 and reached his career-high ranking of world no. 4 in 1999. He won Wimbledon in 1996 and was a semifinalist at the Australian and French Opens. He earned 17 career ATP titles. In doubles, he was ranked world no. 45 and won three career titles, also reaching the semifinals at the Australian Open. His last career ATP match was in 's-Hertogenbusch in June against Olivier Mutis.
- Alex O'Brien (born 7 March 1970 in Amarillo, Texas) He turned professional in 1992 and reached his career-high singles ranking of world no. 30 in 1997. He earned one career singles ATP title. In doubles, he was ranked world no. 1 in 2000 and won the US Open in 1999. He was a finalist at the Australian Open in 1996 and 1997 and a quarterfinalist at Wimbledon in 1999 and 2000. His last career match was in Torrance, California, in October partnering Kevin Kim.
- Sandon Stolle (born 13 July 1970 in Sydney, New South Wales, Australia) He turned professional in 1991 and reached a career-high singles ranking of no. 50 and doubles ranking of no. 2 in 2001. He earned 22 career titles in doubles and won the US Open in 1998, partnering Cyril Suk. He was a finalist at the US Open (1995), French Open (2000), and Wimbledon (2000), each time losing the final match to the "Woodies". His last match was at the Australian Open partnering Andrew Florent.
- Daniel Vacek (born 1 April 1971 in Prague, Czechoslovakia) He turned professional in 1990 and reached his career-high singles ranking of no. 26 in 1996. In doubles, he was ranked no. 3 in 1997 and earned 25 career titles. He won the French Open in 1996 and 1997 and the US Open in 1997. He was also a quarterfinalist at the Australian Open in 1999. He played his last match at Wimbledon partnering Jim Thomas.
- Adrian Voinea (born 6 August 1974 in Focşani, Romania) He turned professional in 1993 and reached his career-high ranking of world no. 36 in 1996. He reached the quarterfinals at the French Open in 1995 and earned one career ATP title. He played his last match in Sopot in July against Olivier Mutis.

== See also ==
- 2003 WTA Tour
