= 2003 Shanghai Open – Singles =

Singles
- 2003 Shanghai Open

Final
- Champion: (Australia) Mark Philippoussis
- Runner-up: (Czech Republic) Jiří Novák
- Score: 6–2, 6–1

Events
Singles	Doubles
- Shanghai Open

Mark Philippoussis won in the final 6–2, 6–1 against Jiří Novák.

== Seeds ==
A champion seed is indicated in bold text while text in italics indicates the round in which that seed was eliminated.

1. (Czech Republic) Jiří Novák (final)
2. (Netherlands) Martin Verkerk (second round)
3. (Australia) **Mark Philippoussis (champion)**
4. n/a
5. (Germany) Nicolas Kiefer (second round)
6. (South Korea) Hyung-Taik Lee (first round)
7. (Sweden) Magnus Norman (quarterfinals)
8. (Netherlands) John van Lottum (first round)

== Draw ==
Key

- Q = Qualifier
- WC = Wild card
- LL = Lucky loser
- Alt = Alternate
- ITF = ITF entry
- PR = Protected ranking
- SR = Special ranking
- SE = Special exempt
- JE = Junior exempt
- JR = Junior Accelerator Programme entrant
- CO = College Accelerator Programme entrant
- NG = Next Gen Accelerator Program entrant
- w/o = Walkover
- r = Retired
- d = Defaulted

First round
1	(Czech Republic) **J Novák**	**6**	**7^{8}**
(Netherlands) D van Scheppingen	2	6^{6}
Q	(Germany) B Phau	**7^{7}**	6^{3}	6^{5}
(United States) **R Kendrick**	6^{4}	**7^{7}**	**7^{7}**
Q	(Czech Republic) J Vacek	4	2
(Spain) **F Verdasco**	**6**	**6**
WC	(China) B Zhu	3	4
7	(Sweden) **M Norman**	**6**	**6**
LL	(Australia) P Luczak	**7**	4	2
(Australia) **W Arthurs**	5	**6**	**6**
LL	(Japan) **T Suzuki**	**6**	**6**
(Germany) L Burgsmüller	4	1
(Croatia) **I Karlović**	6^{3}	**6**	**7^{7}**
Q	(United States) C Mamiit	**7^{7}**	2	6^{5}
(Sweden) T Enqvist	**6**	3	3
5	(Germany) **N Kiefer**	1	**6**	**6**
6	(South Korea) H-T Lee	3	6^{4}
(United States) **E Taino**	**6**	**7^{7}**
Q	(United States) A Kim	6^{8}	6^{0}
WC	(Argentina) **G Cañas**	**7^{7}**	**7^{7}**
(United States) **J Salzenstein**	**6**	**7^{7}**
(Switzerland) I Heuberger	3	6^{3}
(Sweden) A Vinciguerra	4	6^{2}
3	(Australia) **M Philippoussis**	**6**	**7^{7}**
8	(Netherlands) J van Lottum	2	0
(Sweden) **R Söderling**	**6**	**6**
(United States) **J Gimelstob**	**6**	**7^{7}**
(Germany) A Waske	3	6^{4}
(Australia) **S Draper**	**6**	**6**
(Argentina) F Browne	3	4
WC	(China) S-X Zeng	2	3
2	(Netherlands) **M Verkerk**	**6**	**6**

Second round
1	(Czech Republic) **J Novák**	6^{3}	**6**	**6**
(United States) R Kendrick	**7^{7}**	1	2
(Spain) F Verdasco	5	6^{5}
7	(Sweden) **M Norman**	**7**	**7^{7}**
(Australia) **W Arthurs**	**6**	**6**
LL	(Japan) T Suzuki	1	2
(Croatia) **I Karlović**	**6**	**7^{7}**
5	(Germany) N Kiefer	1	6^{5}
(United States) E Taino	**7^{7}**	4	6^{3}
WC	(Argentina) **G Cañas**	6^{1}	**6**	**7^{7}**
(United States) J Salzenstein	1	5
3	(Australia) **M Philippoussis**	**6**	**7**
(Sweden) **R Söderling**	**6**	**6**
(United States) J Gimelstob	4	4
(Australia) **S Draper**	6^{4}	**1**
2	(Netherlands) M Verkerk	**7^{7}**	0	r

Quarterfinals
1	(Czech Republic) **J Novák**	**2**
7	(Sweden) M Norman	1	r
(Australia) **W Arthurs**	**6**	3	**7^{7}**
(Croatia) I Karlović	4	**6**	6^{2}
WC	(Argentina) G Cañas	3	6^{4}
3	(Australia) **M Philippoussis**	**6**	**7^{7}**
(Sweden) **R Söderling**	6^{2}	**7^{7}**	**7^{7}**
(Australia) S Draper	**7^{7}**	6^{3}	6^{1}

Semifinals
1	(Czech Republic) **J Novák**	6^{7}	**6**	**6**
(Australia) W Arthurs	**7^{9}**	3	2
3	(Australia) **M Philippoussis**	**6**	**6**
(Sweden) R Söderling	4	4

Final
1	(Czech Republic) Jiří Novák	2	1
3	(Australia) **Mark Philippoussis**	**6**	**6**
