= 2003 Priority Telecom Open =

- Date: 14–20 July
- Edition: 46th
- Category: International Series
- Draw: 32S / 16D
- Prize money: €375,750
- Surface: Clay / outdoor
- Location: Amersfoort, Netherlands

Champions

Singles
- (Chile) Nicolás Massú

Doubles
- (United States) Devin Bowen / (Australia) Ashley Fisher
- Dutch Open

The 2003 Priority Telecom Open was a men's tennis tournament played on outdoor clay courts in Amersfoort, Netherlands that was part of the International Series of the 2003 ATP Tour. It was the 46th edition of the tournament and was held from 14 July until 20 July 2003. Seventh-seeded Nicolás Massú won the singles title.

== Finals ==
=== Singles ===
(Chile) Nicolás Massú defeated (Netherlands) Raemon Sluiter 6–4, 7–6^{(7–3)}, 6–2

- It was Massú's 1st singles title of the year and the 2nd of his career.

=== Doubles ===
(United States) Devin Bowen / (Australia) Ashley Fisher defeated (South Africa) Chris Haggard / (Brazil) André Sá 6–0, 6–4

- It was Bowen's only title of the year and the 1st of his career. It was Fisher's only title of the year and the 1st of his career.
