= 2003 Open de Moselle =

- Date: 29 September – 5 October
- Edition: 1st
- Category: International Series
- Draw: 32S / 16D
- Prize money: $355,000
- Surface: Hard / indoor
- Location: Metz, France
- Venue: Arènes de Metz

Champions

Singles
- (France) Arnaud Clément

Doubles
- (France) Julien Benneteau / (France) Nicolas Mahut
- Open de Moselle

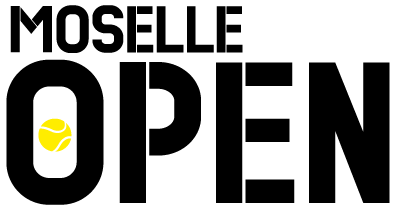
Moselle Open logo

The 2003 Open de Moselle was a men's tennis tournament played on indoor hard courts at the Arènes de Metz in Metz, France and was part of the International Series of the 2003 ATP Tour. It was the inaugural edition of the tournament and was held from 29 September until 5 October 2003. Fourth-seeded Arnaud Clément won the singles title.

== Finals ==
=== Singles ===
(France) Arnaud Clément defeated (Chile) Fernando González 6–3, 1–6, 6–3

- It was Clément's only title of the year and the 4th of his career.

=== Doubles ===
(France) Julien Benneteau / (France) Nicolas Mahut defeated (France) Michaël Llodra / (France) Fabrice Santoro 7–6^{(7–2)}, 6–3

- It was Benneteau's only title of the year and the 1st of his career. It was Mahut's only title of the year and the 1st of his career.
