= 2003 Shanghai Open =

- Date: September 22 – September 28
- Edition: 7th

Champions

Singles
- (Australia) Mark Philippoussis

Doubles
- (Australia) Wayne Arthurs / (Australia) Paul Hanley
← 2002 ·	Shanghai Open	· 2004 →

The 2003 Shanghai Open was a tennis tournament played on outdoor hard courts in Shanghai in the People's Republic of China and was part of the International Series of the 2003 ATP Tour. The tournament ran from September 22 through September 28, 2003.

== Finals ==
=== Singles ===
(Australia) Mark Philippoussis defeated (Czech Republic) Jiří Novák 6–2, 6–1

- It was Philippoussis' only title of the year and the 13th of his career.

=== Doubles ===
(Australia) Wayne Arthurs / (Australia) Paul Hanley defeated (China) Zeng Shaoxuan / (China) Zhu Benqiang 6–2, 6–4

- It was Arthurs' 3rd title of the year and the 9th of his career. It was Hanley's 4th title of the year and the 5th of his career.
