= 2003 Shanghai Open – Doubles =

Doubles
- 2003 Shanghai Open

Final
- Champions: (Australia) Wayne Arthurs (Australia) Paul Hanley
- Runners-up: (China) Zeng Shaoxuan (China) Zhu Benqiang
- Score: 6–2, 6–4

Events
Singles	Doubles
← 2002 ·	Shanghai Open	· 2004 →

Wayne Arthurs and Paul Hanley won in the final 6–2, 6–4 against Zeng Shaoxuan and Zhu Benqiang.

== Seeds ==
Champion seeds are indicated in bold text while text in italics indicates the round in which those seeds were eliminated.

1. (Australia) **Wayne Arthurs** / (Australia) **Paul Hanley (champions)**
2. (Argentina) Martín García / (United States) Graydon Oliver (quarterfinals)
3. (United States) Scott Humphries / (The Bahamas) Mark Merklein (first round)
4. (Australia) Todd Perry / (Japan) Thomas Shimada (quarterfinals)

== Draw ==
=== Key ===
- Q = Qualifier
- WC = Wild card
- LL = Lucky loser
- Alt = Alternate
- SE = Special exempt
- PR = Protected ranking
- ITF = ITF entry
- JE = Junior exempt
- w/o = Walkover
- r = Retired
- d = Defaulted
- SR = Special ranking

First round
1	(Australia) **W Arthurs** (Australia) **P Hanley**	6^{4}	**6**	**7**
(United States) D Ayala (United States) R Kendrick	**7^{7}**	4	5
(United States) B Coupe (United States) J Thomas	4	**6**	5
(United States) **J Gimelstob** (Germany) **N Kiefer**	**6**	3	**7**
4	(Australia) **T Perry** (Japan) **T Shimada**	**6**	**6**
(Sweden) M Norman (Sweden) A Vinciguerra	3	4
ALT	(Australia) S Draper (Australia) P Luczak	4	**6**	4
(Czech Republic) **J Novák** (Czech Republic) **P Pála**	**6**	4	**6**
(Germany) L Burgsmüller (Czech Republic) J Vacek	3	**6**	1
WC	(China) **S Zeng** (China) **B Zhu**	**6**	3	**6**
WC	(United States) **C Mamiit** (United States) **E Taino**	4	**7**	**6**
3	(United States) S Humphries (The Bahamas) M Merklein	**6**	5	4
(United States) A Kim (South Korea) H-T Lee	4	3
(Argentina) **F Browne** (Croatia) **I Karlović**	**6**	**6**
(Netherlands) J van Lottum (Germany) A Waske	5	**7^{7}**	6^{4}
2	(Argentina) **M García** (United States) **G Oliver**	**7**	6^{4}	**7^{7}**

Quarterfinals
1	(Australia) **W Arthurs** (Australia) **P Hanley**	**7^{7}**	**7^{7}**
(United States) J Gimelstob (Germany) N Kiefer	6^{5}	6^{5}
4	(Australia) T Perry (Japan) T Shimada	4	2
(Czech Republic) **J Novák** (Czech Republic) **P Pála**	**6**	**6**
WC	(China) **S Zeng** (China) **B Zhu**	2	**7^{7}**	**6**
WC	(United States) C Mamiit (United States) E Taino	**6**	6^{5}	3
(Argentina) **F Browne** (Croatia) **I Karlović**	**7^{7}**	**6**
2	(Argentina) M García (United States) G Oliver	6^{3}	3

Semifinals
1	(Australia) **W Arthurs** (Australia) **P Hanley**	6^{9}	**6**	**7^{7}**
(Czech Republic) J Novák (Czech Republic) P Pála	**7^{11}**	2	6^{4}
WC	(China) **S Zeng** (China) **B Zhu**	**6**	**6**
(Argentina) F Browne (Croatia) I Karlović	3	2

Final
1	(Australia) **Wayne Arthurs** (Australia) **Paul Hanley**	**6**	**6**
WC	(China) Zeng Shaoxuan (China) Zhu Benqiang	2	4
