= 2003 TD Waterhouse Cup =

- Date: August 18–24
- Edition: 23rd
- Category: International Series
- Draw: 32S / 16D
- Prize money: $355,000
- Surface: Hard / outdoor
- Venue: Jericho, New York, United States

Champions

Singles
- (Thailand) Paradorn Srichaphan

Doubles
- (South Africa) Robbie Koenig / (Argentina) Martín Rodríguez
- TD Waterhouse Cup

The 2003 TD Waterhouse Cup was a men's tennis tournament played on outdoor hard courts at the Hamlet Golf and Country Club in Jericho, New York in the United States and was part of the International Series of the 2003 ATP Tour. The tournament ran from August 18 through August 24, 2003. First-seeded Paradorn Srichaphan won his second consecutive singles title at the event.

== Finals ==
=== Singles ===
(Thailand) Paradorn Srichaphan defeated (United States) James Blake 6–2, 6–4

- It was Srichaphan's 2nd and last singles title of the year and the 4th of his career.

=== Doubles ===
(South Africa) Robbie Koenig / (Argentina) Martín Rodríguez defeated (Czech Republic) Martin Damm / (Czech Republic) Cyril Suk 6–3, 7–6^{(7–4)}

- It was Koenig's 2nd title of the year and the 4th of his career. It was Rodríguez's only title of the year and the 3rd of his career.
