= 2003 Allianz Suisse Open Gstaad =

- Date: 7–13 July
- Edition: 58th
- Category: International Series
- Draw: 32S / 16D
- Prize money: $525,000
- Surface: Clay / outdoor
- Location: Gstaad, Switzerland
- Venue: Roy Emerson Arena

Champions

Singles
- (Czech Republic) Jiří Novák

Doubles
- (India) Leander Paes / (Czech Republic) David Rikl
- Swiss Open

The 2003 Allianz Suisse Open Gstaad was a men's tennis tournament played on outdoor clay courts at the Roy Emerson Arena in Gstaad in Switzerland and was part of the International Series of the 2003 ATP Tour. It was the 58th edition of the tournament and was held from 7 July through 13 July 2003. Third-seeded Jiří Novák won the singles title.

== Finals ==
=== Singles ===
(Czech Republic) Jiří Novák defeated (Switzerland) Roger Federer 5–7, 6–3, 6–3, 1–6, 6–3

- It was Novák's only title of the year and the 20th of his career.

=== Doubles ===
(India) Leander Paes / (Czech Republic) David Rikl defeated (Czech Republic) František Čermák / (Czech Republic) Leoš Friedl 6–3, 6–3

- It was Paes' 3rd title of the year and the 27th of his career. It was Rikl's 2nd title of the year and the 28th of his career.
