= 2003 Priority Telecom Open – Singles =

Singles
- 2003 Priority Telecom Open

Final
- Champion: (Chile) Nicolás Massú
- Runner-up: (Netherlands) Raemon Sluiter
- Score: 6–4, 7–6^{(7–3)}, 6–2

Events
| Singles | Doubles |
- Priority Telecom Open

Juan Ignacio Chela was the defending champion but lost in the second round to Rubén Ramírez Hidalgo.

Nicolás Massú won in the final 6–4, 7–6^{(7–3)}, 6–2 against Raemon Sluiter.

== Seeds ==
1. (Netherlands) Martin Verkerk (first round)
2. (Argentina) Gastón Gaudio (first round)
3. (Argentina) Juan Ignacio Chela (second round)
4. n/a
5. (Spain) Fernando Vicente (first round)
6. (Netherlands) Raemon Sluiter (final)
7. (Chile) Nicolás Massú (champion)
8. (Spain) Albert Portas (first round)
9. (Argentina) Franco Squillari (second round)

== Draw ==
Key

- Q = Qualifier
- WC = Wild card
- LL = Lucky loser
- Alt = Alternate
- ITF = ITF entry
- PR = Protected ranking
- SR = Special ranking
- SE = Special exempt
- JE = Junior exempt
- JR = Junior Accelerator Programme entrant
- CO = College Accelerator Programme entrant
- NG = Next Gen Accelerator Program entrant
- w/o = Walkover
- r = Retired
- d = Defaulted

=== Finals ===
Semifinals
(Spain) Albert Montañés | 6^{4} | 6 | 3
6 | (Netherlands) Raemon Sluiter | 7^{7} | 1 | 6
7 | (Chile) Nicolás Massú | 6 | 4
(Peru) Luis Horna | 3 | 0^{r}

Final
6 | (Netherlands) Raemon Sluiter | 4 | 6^{3} | 2
7 | (Chile) Nicolás Massú | 6 | 7^{7} | 6

=== Section 1 ===
First round
1 | (Netherlands) M Verkerk | 6 | 1 | 4
(Italy) G Galimberti | 3 | 6 | 6
(Spain) A Montañés | 5
(Austria) J Melzer | 1^{r}
(Romania) A Voinea | 6 | 4 | 3
(Austria) M Hipfl | 2 | 6 | 6
(Netherlands) J van Lottum | 7^{7} | 6
5 | (Spain) F Vicente | 6^{3} | 0
3 | (Argentina) J I Chela | 6 | 6
(Argentina) M Puerta | 3 | 1
WC | (Spain) F Clavet | 4 | 2
(Spain) R Ramírez Hidalgo | 6 | 6
Q | (United States) H Armando | 4 | 4
Q | (Switzerland) S Wawrinka | 6 | 6
(Germany) A Waske | 4 | 3
6 | (Netherlands) R Sluiter | 6 | 6

Second round
(Italy) G Galimberti | 4 | 3
(Spain) A Montañés | 6 | 6
(Austria) M Hipfl | 6 | 1 | 6
(Netherlands) J van Lottum | 1 | 6 | 4
3 | (Argentina) J I Chela | 1 | 1
(Spain) R Ramírez Hidalgo | 6 | 6
Q | (Switzerland) S Wawrinka | 1 | 4
6 | (Netherlands) R Sluiter | 6 | 6

Quarterfinals
(Spain) A Montañés | 6 | 6
(Austria) M Hipfl | 2 | 3
(Spain) R Ramírez Hidalgo | 6^{4} | 7^{7} | 2
6 | (Netherlands) R Sluiter | 7^{7} | 6^{2} | 6

Semifinals
(Spain) A Montañés | 6^{4} | 6 | 3
6 | (Netherlands) R Sluiter | 7^{7} | 1 | 6

=== Section 2 ===
First round
7 | (Chile) N Massú | 4 | 6 | 7^{8}
(Morocco) H Arazi | 6 | 4 | 6^{6}
(Brazil) A Sá | 6 | 4 | 7^{7}
Q | (Czech Republic) J Levinský | 2 | 6 | 6^{2}
WC | (Netherlands) D van Scheppingen | 7^{7} | 1
(Georgia (country)) I Labadze | 6^{3} | 0^{r}
(Croatia) Ž Krajan | 3 | 0^{r}
9 | (Argentina) F Squillari | 6 | 1
8 | (Spain) A Portas | 3 | 5
(Peru) L Horna | 6 | 7
(Belgium) C Rochus | 6 | 4 | 7
(Belgium) K Vliegen | 4 | 6 | 5
Q | (Spain) Ó Hernández | 6 | 6
WC | (Netherlands) F Hemmes Jr. | 1 | 1
(Monaco) J-R Lisnard | 6 | 7^{7}
2 | (Argentina) G Gaudio | 0 | 6^{5}

Second round
7 | (Chile) N Massú | 6 | 6
(Brazil) A Sá | 2 | 2
WC | (Netherlands) D van Scheppingen | 4 | 6 | 6
9 | (Argentina) F Squillari | 6 | 4 | 4
(Peru) L Horna | 6 | 6
(Belgium) C Rochus | 4 | 4
Q | (Spain) Ó Hernández | 7^{9} | 1 | 7^{7}
(Monaco) J-R Lisnard | 6^{7} | 6 | 6^{4}

Quarterfinals
7 | (Chile) N Massú | 6 | 7
WC | (Netherlands) D van Scheppingen | 2 | 5
(Peru) L Horna | 6^{5} | 6 | 6
Q | (Spain) Ó Hernández | 7^{7} | 3 | 3

Semifinals
7 | (Chile) N Massú | 6 | 4
(Peru) L Horna | 3 | 0^{r}
