= 2003 Allianz Suisse Open Gstaad – Singles =

Singles
- 2003 Allianz Suisse Open Gstaad

Final
- Champion: (Czech Republic) Jiří Novák
- Runner-up: (Switzerland) Roger Federer
- Score: 5–7, 6–3, 6–3, 1–6, 6–3

Details
- Draw: 32
- Seeds: 8

Events
Singles	Doubles
- Swiss Open

Àlex Corretja was the defending champion but lost in the second round to David Sánchez.

Jiří Novák won in the final 5–7, 6–3, 6–3, 1–6, 6–3 against Roger Federer.

This tournament was also notable for being the first ATP tournament in which future Grand Slam Champion Stanislas Wawrinka competed in the main draw. He drew Jean-René Lisnard in the first round and was defeated.

== Seeds ==
A champion seed is indicated in bold while text in italics indicates the round in which that seed was eliminated.

1. (Switzerland) Roger Federer (final)
2. (Germany) Rainer Schüttler (quarterfinals)
3. (Czech Republic) **Jiří Novák (champion)**
4. (Argentina) Gastón Gaudio (semifinals)
5. (Argentina) Juan Ignacio Chela (quarterfinals)
6. (Russia) Nikolay Davydenko (first round)
7. (Spain) Àlex Corretja (second round)
8. (Czech Republic) Radek Štěpánek (semifinals)

== Draw ==
Key

- Q = Qualifier
- WC = Wild card
- LL = Lucky loser
- Alt = Alternate
- ITF = ITF entry
- PR = Protected ranking
- SR = Special ranking
- SE = Special exempt
- JE = Junior exempt
- JR = Junior Accelerator Programme entrant
- CO = College Accelerator Programme entrant
- NG = Next Gen Accelerator Program entrant
- w/o = Walkover
- r = Retired
- d = Defaulted
- NB: The Final was the best of 5 sets while all other rounds were the best of 3 sets.

=== Final ===
Final
1	(Switzerland) Roger Federer	**7**	3	3	**6**	3
3	(Czech Republic) **Jiří Novák**	5	**6**	**6**	1	**6**

=== Section 1 ===
First round
1	(Switzerland) **R Federer**	**6**	6^{4}	**6**
Q	(Spain) M López	3	**7^{7}**	3
WC	(Switzerland) S Wawrinka	**6**	1	5
(Monaco) **J-R Lisnard**	2	**6**	**7**
(Spain) **D Sánchez**	**6**	**7**
(Slovakia) K Beck	4	5
(Netherlands) J van Lottum	1	2
WC/7	(Spain) **À Corretja**	**6**	**6**
4	(Argentina) **G Gaudio**	**6**	**6**
(Belgium) K Vliegen	3	4
(Germany) **L Burgsmüller**	**6**	6^{6}	**6**
(Croatia) Ž Krajan	2	**7^{8}**	1
Q	(Spain) G Blanco	1	**6**	3
(Austria) **S Koubek**	**6**	1	**6**
(France) **A Dupuis**	**7^{7}**	**7^{7}**
6	(Russia) N Davydenko	6^{1}	6^{4}

Second round
1	(Switzerland) **R Federer**	**6**	**6**
(Monaco) J-R Lisnard	1	2
(Spain) **D Sánchez**	**6**	**6**
WC/7	(Spain) À Corretja	4	4
4	(Argentina) **G Gaudio**	4	**6**	**6**
(Germany) L Burgsmüller	**6**	2	4
(Austria) **S Koubek**	**6**	**6**
(France) A Dupuis	1	2

Quarterfinals
1	(Switzerland) **R Federer**	w/o
(Spain) D Sánchez
4	(Argentina) **G Gaudio**	**6**	**6**
(Austria) S Koubek	3	1

Semifinals
1	(Switzerland) **R Federer**	**6**	**7^{8}**
4	(Argentina) G Gaudio	1	6^{6}

=== Section 2 ===
First round
5	(Argentina) **J I Chela**	**6**	**6**
(Brazil) A Sá	0	2
(Spain) **F López**	**6**	**6**
(Georgia (country)) I Labadze	0	2
(France) **P-H Mathieu**	**6**	**6**
Q	(Germany) P Kohlschreiber	3	1
(Armenia) S Sargsian	3	3
3	(Czech Republic) **J Novák**	**6**	**6**
8	(Czech Republic) **R Štěpánek**	**6**	**6**
Q	(United States) H Armando	3	3
(Germany) T Behrend	4	**7^{8}**	2
(Switzerland) **M Kratochvil**	**6**	6^{6}	**6**
WC	(Switzerland) M Lammer	3	5
(Belgium) **C Rochus**	**6**	**7**
(Australia) W Arthurs	2	3
2	(Germany) **R Schüttler**	**6**	**6**

Second round
5	(Argentina) **J I Chela**	**6**	6^{2}	**7^{7}**
(Spain) F López	4	**7^{7}**	6^{3}
(France) P-H Mathieu	**6**	2	3
3	(Czech Republic) **J Novák**	1	**6**	**6**
8	(Czech Republic) **R Štěpánek**	**6**	**7^{7}**
(Switzerland) M Kratochvil	3	6^{5}
(Belgium) C Rochus	3	6^{6}
2	(Germany) **R Schüttler**	**6**	**7^{8}**

Quarterfinals
6	(Argentina) J I Chela	3	3
3	(Czech Republic) **J Novák**	**6**	**6**
8	(Czech Republic) **R Štěpánek**	**6**	**6**
2	(Germany) R Schüttler	4	2

Semifinals
3	(Czech Republic) **J Novák**	**7**	**6**
8	(Czech Republic) R Štěpánek	5	1
