= 2003 Open de Moselle – Doubles =

Doubles
- 2003 Open de Moselle

Final
- Champions: (France) Julien Benneteau (France) Nicolas Mahut
- Runners-up: (France) Michaël Llodra (France) Fabrice Santoro
- Score: 7–6^{(7–2)}, 6–3

Events
Singles	Doubles
Open de Moselle	· 2004 →

Julien Benneteau and Nicolas Mahut won in the final 7–6^{(7–2)}, 6–3 against Michaël Llodra and Fabrice Santoro.

== Seeds ==
1. (France) Michaël Llodra / (France) Fabrice Santoro (final)
2. (Argentina) Gastón Etlis / (Argentina) Martín Rodríguez (first round)
3. (Argentina) Lucas Arnold / (Argentina) Mariano Hood (first round)
4. (Sweden) Simon Aspelin / (Italy) Massimo Bertolini (quarterfinals)

== Draw ==
=== Key ===
- Q = Qualifier
- WC = Wild card
- LL = Lucky loser
- Alt = Alternate
- SE = Special exempt
- PR = Protected ranking
- ITF = ITF entry
- JE = Junior exempt
- w/o = Walkover
- r = Retired
- d = Defaulted
- SR = Special ranking

First round
1	(France) M Llodra (France) F Santoro	4	6	6
(Spain) Á López Morón (Spain) F Vicente	6	3	3
(United States) D Bowen (Australia) A Fisher	6^{9}	5
WC	(France) T Ascione (France) J-F Bachelot	7^{11}	7
3	(Argentina) L Arnold (Argentina) M Hood	3	6	6^{5}
(Slovakia) D Hrbatý (Belgium) T Vanhoudt	6	3	7^{7}
(Spain) J I Carrasco (Spain) T Robredo	7^{7}	6
(Germany) K Braasch (Austria) J Melzer	6^{4}	4
(Austria) J Knowle (Germany) M Kohlmann	4	6	6
(France) A Dupuis (France) R Gasquet	6	4	3
(Chile) F González (Belarus) V Voltchkov	6^{6}	5
4	(Sweden) S Aspelin (Italy) M Bertolini	7^{8}	7
(Sweden) J Landsberg (Italy) D Sanguinetti	7	6
(France) A Clément (France) O Mutis	5	3
WC	(France) J Benneteau (France) N Mahut	6	7^{7}
2	(Argentina) G Etlis (Argentina) M Rodríguez	3	6^{5}

Quarterfinals
1	(France) M Llodra (France) F Santoro	6	6
WC	(France) T Ascione (France) J-F Bachelot	4	1
(Slovakia) D Hrbatý (Belgium) T Vanhoudt	6	1	6
(Spain) J I Carrasco (Spain) T Robredo	4	6	3
(Austria) J Knowle (Germany) M Kohlmann	6	4	7^{7}
4	(Sweden) S Aspelin (Italy) M Bertolini	2	6	6^{2}
(Sweden) J Landsberg (Italy) D Sanguinetti	3	3
WC	(France) J Benneteau (France) N Mahut	6	6

Semifinals
1	(France) M Llodra (France) F Santoro	7^{7}	6
(Slovakia) D Hrbatý (Belgium) T Vanhoudt	6^{5}	4
(Austria) J Knowle (Germany) M Kohlmann	4	6	3
WC	(France) J Benneteau (France) N Mahut	6	1	6

Final
1	(France) M Llodra (France) F Santoro	6^{2}	3
WC	(France) J Benneteau (France) N Mahut	7^{7}	6
