= 2003 TD Waterhouse Cup – Singles =

Singles
- 2003 TD Waterhouse Cup
- 2002 Champion: (Thailand) Paradorn Srichaphan

Final
- Champion: (Thailand) Paradorn Srichaphan
- Runner-up: (United States) James Blake
- Score: 6–2, 6–4

Details
- Draw: 32
- Seeds: 8

Events
Singles	Doubles
- TD Waterhouse Cup

Paradorn Srichaphan was the defending champion and won in the final 6–2, 6–4 against James Blake.

== Seeds ==
A champion seed is indicated in bold text while text in italics indicates the round in which that seed was eliminated.

1. (Thailand) **Paradorn Srichaphan (champion)**
2. (Brazil) Gustavo Kuerten (quarterfinals)
3. (Spain) Tommy Robredo (second round)
4. (Chile) Fernando González (first round)
5. (Spain) Félix Mantilla (first round)
6. (Argentina) Agustín Calleri (second round)
7. (Morocco) Younes El Aynaoui (semifinals)
8. (Spain) Albert Costa (first round)

== Draw ==
Key

- Q = Qualifier
- WC = Wild card
- LL = Lucky loser
- Alt = Alternate
- ITF = ITF entry
- PR = Protected ranking
- SR = Special ranking
- SE = Special exempt
- JE = Junior exempt
- JR = Junior Accelerator Programme entrant
- CO = College Accelerator Programme entrant
- NG = Next Gen Accelerator Program entrant
- w/o = Walkover
- r = Retired
- d = Defaulted

First round
1	(Thailand) **P Srichaphan**	**6**	**6**
(Russia) N Davydenko	3	4
(Spain) À Corretja	5	2
(Armenia) **S Sargsian**	**7**	**6**
(France) A Clément	4	4
Q	(United States) **J Morrison**	**6**	**6**
(Russia) **M Youzhny**	**6**	**6**
5	(Spain) F Mantilla	2	1
4	(Chile) F González	**6**	6^{8}	0
(Argentina) **J I Chela**	4	**7^{10}**	**6**
(Spain) F Vicente	6^{5}	1
(Belgium) **O Rochus**	**7^{7}**	**6**
WC	(Germany) **N Kiefer**	4	**7^{7}**	**6**
(France) P-H Mathieu	**6**	6^{4}	3
(Brazil) **F Saretta**	**3**
8	(Spain) A Costa	0	r
6	(Argentina) **A Calleri**	**6**	**7**
(United States) J-M Gambill	4	5
(Finland) **J Nieminen**	**6**	**1**
(Spain) F López	3	1	r
(Sweden) J Björkman	1	6^{4}
(United States) **J Blake**	**6**	**7^{7}**
(Argentina) J Acasuso	**6**	3	5
3	(Spain) **T Robredo**	2	**6**	**7**
7	(Morocco) **Y El Aynaoui**	6^{4}	**6**	**6**
Q	(Spain) F Verdasco	**7^{7}**	4	0
Q	(South Africa) **R de Voest**	**6**	**6**
WC	(United States) M Chang	2	3
(Spain) D Sánchez	**6**	4	3
Q	(Slovakia) **K Beck**	2	**6**	**6**
LL	(Slovakia) D Hrbatý	4	6^{3}
WC/2	(Brazil) **G Kuerten**	**6**	**7^{7}**

Second round
1	(Thailand) **P Srichaphan**	**6**	**6**
(Armenia) S Sargsian	3	4
Q	(United States) **J Morrison**	**7^{9}**	**6**
(Russia) M Youzhny	6^{7}	3
(Argentina) **J I Chela**	**7^{7}**	**6**
(Belgium) O Rochus	6^{3}	1
WC	(Germany) **N Kiefer**	**6**	**6**
(Brazil) F Saretta	3	1
6	(Argentina) A Calleri	1	4
(Finland) **J Nieminen**	**6**	**6**
(United States) **J Blake**	**6**	**6**
3	(Spain) T Robredo	3	4
7	(Morocco) **Y El Aynaoui**	**7^{7}**	**3**
Q	(South Africa) R de Voest	6^{3}	0	r
Q	(Slovakia) K Beck	5	3
WC/2	(Brazil) **G Kuerten**	**7**	**6**

Quarterfinals
1	(Thailand) **P Srichaphan**	**6**	**6**
Q	(United States) J Morrison	4	3
(Argentina) J I Chela	1	0	r
WC	(Germany) **N Kiefer**	**6**	**3**
(Finland) J Nieminen	**6**	2	3
(United States) **J Blake**	4	**6**	**6**
7	(Morocco) **Y El Aynaoui**	**7^{7}**	**6**
WC/2	(Brazil) G Kuerten	6^{4}	4

Semifinals
1	(Thailand) **P Srichaphan**	**6**	**6**
WC	(Germany) N Kiefer	0	2
(United States) **J Blake**	**6**	**6**
7	(Morocco) Y El Aynaoui	3	1

Final
1	(Thailand) **P Srichaphan**	**6**	**6**
(United States) James Blake	2	4
