= 2003 Open de Moselle – Singles =

Singles
- 2003 Open de Moselle

Final
- Champion: (France) Arnaud Clément
- Runner-up: (Chile) Fernando González
- Score: 6–3, 1–6, 6–3

Events
Singles	Doubles
- Open de Moselle

Arnaud Clément won in the final 6–3, 1–6, 6–3 against Fernando González.

== Seeds ==
1. (Spain) Tommy Robredo (quarterfinals)
2. (Morocco) Younes El Aynaoui (first round)
3. (Chile) Fernando González (final)
4. (France) Arnaud Clément (champion)
5. (France) Fabrice Santoro (semifinals)
6. (Slovakia) Dominik Hrbatý (first round)
7. (France) Antony Dupuis (first round)
8. (Morocco) Hicham Arazi (second round)

== Draw ==
Key

- Q = Qualifier
- WC = Wild card
- LL = Lucky loser
- Alt = Alternate
- ITF = ITF entry
- PR = Protected ranking
- SR = Special ranking
- SE = Special exempt
- JE = Junior exempt
- JR = Junior Accelerator Programme entrant
- CO = College Accelerator Programme entrant
- NG = Next Gen Accelerator Program entrant
- w/o = Walkover
- r = Retired
- d = Defaulted

=== Finals ===
Semifinals
(Romania) Andrei Pavel	3	4
3	(Chile) Fernando González	6	6
4	(France) Arnaud Clément	6	6
5	(France) Fabrice Santoro	2	1

Final
3	(Chile) Fernando González	3	6	3
4	(France) Arnaud Clément	6	1	6

=== Top half ===
First round
1	(Spain) T Robredo	6	7^{7}
(Austria) J Melzer	2	6^{5}
Q	(Italy) C Caratti	3	7	4
(Monaco) J-R Lisnard	6	5	6
Q	(Czech Republic) P Šnobel	4	1
(Romania) V Hănescu	6	6
(Romania) A Pavel	4	6	7^{7}
6	(Slovakia) D Hrbatý	6	4	6^{3}
3	(Chile) F González	6	6
(Belgium) C Rochus	4	4
(Germany) T Behrend	7	6
(Argentina) M Puerta	5	4
(Slovakia) K Beck	1	2
(Spain) D Ferrer	6	6
(Spain) R Ramírez Hidalgo	3	0
8	(Morocco) H Arazi	6	6

Second round
1	(Spain) T Robredo	6	6
(Monaco) J-R Lisnard	2	2
(Romania) V Hănescu	4	6	3
(Romania) A Pavel	6	3	6
3	(Chile) F González	6	6^{6}	7^{7}
(Germany) T Behrend	2	7^{8}	6^{5}
(Spain) D Ferrer	6	5	6
8	(Morocco) H Arazi	4	7	0

Quarterfinals
1	(Spain) T Robredo	6^{3}	6	1
(Romania) A Pavel	7^{7}	4	6
3	(Chile) F González	7	6
(Spain) D Ferrer	5	2

Semifinals
(Romania) A Pavel	3	4
3	(Chile) F González	6	6

=== Bottom half ===
First round
7	(France) A Dupuis	6^{1}	4
Q	(Germany) P Petzschner	7^{7}	6
Q	(France) T Ascione	6	6
(Belarus) V Voltchkov	2	4
WC	(Sweden) T Enqvist	5	3
(Italy) D Sanguinetti	7	6
WC	(France) M Llodra	5	1
4	(France) A Clément	7	6
5	(France) F Santoro	6	6
SE	(Argentina) D Veronelli	3	0
WC	(France) R Gasquet	6	4	5
(France) O Mutis	4	6	7
(Spain) F Vicente	3	1
(Germany) A Popp	6	6
(France) N Mahut	7^{7}	4	7^{7}
2	(Morocco) Y El Aynaoui	6^{4}	6	6^{2}

Second round
Q	(Germany) P Petzschner	6	7^{7}
Q	(France) T Ascione	4	6^{4}
(Italy) D Sanguinetti	5	5
4	(France) A Clément	7	7
5	(France) F Santoro	7^{7}	6
(France) O Mutis	6^{4}	4
(Germany) A Popp	7^{7}	5	6
(France) N Mahut	6^{2}	7	4

Quarterfinals
Q	(Germany) P Petzschner	2	0^{r}
4	(France) A Clément	6	3
5	(France) F Santoro	2	6	6
(Germany) A Popp	6	3	4

Semifinals
4	(France) A Clément	6	6
5	(France) F Santoro	2	1
