= 2003 TD Waterhouse Cup – Doubles =

Doubles
- 2003 TD Waterhouse Cup
- 2002 Champions: (India) Mahesh Bhupathi (United States) Mike Bryan

Final
- Champions: (South Africa) Robbie Koenig (Argentina) Martín Rodríguez
- Runners-up: (Czech Republic) Martin Damm (Czech Republic) Cyril Suk
- Score: 6–3, 7–6 (7–4)

Details
- Draw: 16
- Seeds: 4

Events
Singles	Doubles
- TD Waterhouse Cup

Mahesh Bhupathi and Mike Bryan were the defending champions but did not compete that year.

Robbie Koenig and Martín Rodríguez won in the final 6–3, 7–6 (7–4) against Martin Damm and Cyril Suk.

== Seeds ==
Champion seeds are indicated in bold text while text in italics indicates the round in which those seeds were eliminated.

1. n/a
2. (Russia) Yevgeny Kafelnikov / (France) Fabrice Santoro (semifinals)
3. (Czech Republic) Martin Damm / (Czech Republic) Cyril Suk (final)
4. (Zimbabwe) Wayne Black / (Zimbabwe) Kevin Ullyett (quarterfinals)

== Draw ==
Key

- Q = Qualifier
- WC = Wild card
- LL = Lucky loser
- Alt = Alternate
- ITF = ITF entry
- PR = Protected ranking
- SR = Special ranking
- SE = Special exempt
- JE = Junior exempt
- JR = Junior Accelerator Programme entrant
- CO = College Accelerator Programme entrant
- NG = Next Gen Accelerator Program entrant
- w/o = Walkover
- r = Retired
- d = Defaulted

First round
ALT	(United States) **J Thomas** (South Africa) **M Wakefield**	**7^{7}**	**7^{7}**
(Brazil) G Kuerten (Brazil) F Saretta	6^{4}	6^{3}
(Morocco) Y El Aynaoui (Belgium) T Vanhoudt	**6**	2	3
(South Africa) **R Koenig** (Argentina) **M Rodríguez**	2	**6**	**6**
4	(Zimbabwe) **W Black** (Zimbabwe) **K Ullyett**	**6**	**6**
(Spain) F Mantilla (Spain) T Robredo	2	2
(Czech Republic) **T Cibulec** (Czech Republic) **P Vízner**	4	**6**	**7^{7}**
(United States) D Bowen (The Bahamas) M Merklein	**6**	4	6^{3}
(Argentina) A Calleri (Argentina) D Nalbandian	4	4
(Czech Republic) **L Friedl** (Czech Republic) **P Pála**	**6**	**6**
(Argentina) J I Chela (Chile) N Massú	**7^{7}**	1	4
3	(Czech Republic) **M Damm** (Czech Republic) **C Suk**	6^{5}	**6**	**6**
WC	(Argentina) A Asta (Chile) S Contador	4	4
WC	(United States) **J-M Gambill** (United States) **T Parrott**	**6**	**6**
(Russia) N Davydenko (Russia) M Youzhny	6^{4}	2
2	(Russia) **Y Kafelnikov** (France) **F Santoro**	**7^{7}**	**6**

Quarterfinals
ALT	(United States) J Thomas (South Africa) M Wakefield	**7^{7}**	6^{3}	r
(South Africa) **R Koenig** (Argentina) **M Rodríguez**	6^{4}	**7^{7}**
4	(Zimbabwe) W Black (Zimbabwe) K Ullyett	5	4
(Czech Republic) **T Cibulec** (Czech Republic) **P Vízner**	**7**	**6**
(Czech Republic) L Friedl (Czech Republic) P Pála	1	3
3	(Czech Republic) **M Damm** (Czech Republic) **C Suk**	**6**	**6**
WC	(United States) J-M Gambill (United States) T Parrott	6^{5}	3
2	(Russia) **Y Kafelnikov** (France) **F Santoro**	**7^{7}**	**6**

Semifinals
(South Africa) **R Koenig** (Argentina) **M Rodríguez**	**7^{7}**	**7**
(Czech Republic) T Cibulec (Czech Republic) P Vízner	6^{3}	5
3	(Czech Republic) **M Damm** (Czech Republic) **C Suk**	**6**	**6**
2	(Russia) Y Kafelnikov (France) F Santoro	4	4

Final
(South Africa) **Robbie Koenig** (Argentina) **Martín Rodríguez**	**6**	**7^{7}**
3	(Czech Republic) Martin Damm (Czech Republic) Cyril Suk	3	6^{4}
