= 2003 Dubai Tennis Championships – Singles =

Singles
- 2003 Dubai Tennis Championships and the Dubai Duty Free Women's Open

Final
- Champion: (Switzerland) Roger Federer
- Runner-up: (Czech Republic) Jiří Novák
- Score: 6–1, 7–6^{(7–2)}

Details
- Draw: 32
- Seeds: 8

Events
Singles	men	women
Doubles	men	women
- Dubai Tennis Championships Dubai Duty Free Women's Open

Fabrice Santoro was the defending champion, but lost in the second round to Sjeng Schalken.

Roger Federer won in the final 6–1, 7–6^{(7–2)}against Jiří Novák. He did not lose a single set in the entire tournament.

== Seeds ==
A champion seed is indicated in bold text while text in italics indicates the round in which that seed was eliminated.

1. (Switzerland) **Roger Federer (champion)**
2. (Russia) Marat Safin (second round)
3. (Czech Republic) Jiří Novák (final)
4. (United Kingdom) Tim Henman (first round)
5. (Germany) Rainer Schüttler (quarterfinals)
6. (Netherlands) Sjeng Schalken (quarterfinals)
7. (Morocco) Younes El Aynaoui (second round)
8. (Russia) Yevgeny Kafelnikov (second round)

== Draw ==
Key

- Q = Qualifier
- WC = Wild card
- LL = Lucky loser
- Alt = Alternate
- ITF = ITF entry
- PR = Protected ranking
- SR = Special ranking
- SE = Special exempt
- JE = Junior exempt
- JR = Junior Accelerator Programme entrant
- CO = College Accelerator Programme entrant
- NG = Next Gen Accelerator Program entrant
- w/o = Walkover
- r = Retired
- d = Defaulted

First round
1	(Switzerland) **R Federer**	**6**	**6**
(Georgia (country)) I Labadze	3	3
Q	(Germany) **M Abel**	0
(Switzerland) I Heuberger	1^{r}
WC	(Morocco) **H Arazi**	**6**	**6**
(Czech Republic) J Vacek	2	1
(Netherlands) J van Lottum	2	**6**	3
8	(Russia) **Y Kafelnikov**	**6**	4	**6**
4	(United Kingdom) T Henman	**7**	6^{3}	4
(Hungary) **A Sávolt**	5	**7^{7}**	**6**
Q	(Zimbabwe) W Black	5	3
(Croatia) **I Ljubičić**	**7**	**6**
(Romania) A Voinea	4	2
(Belarus) **M Mirnyi**	**6**	**6**
(Croatia) Ž Krajan	4	**6**	3
5	(Germany) **R Schüttler**	**6**	2	**6**
6	(Netherlands) **S Schalken**	**7**	**6**
(Russia) M Youzhny	5	0
(France) **F Santoro**	6^{1}	**6**	**6**
(Austria) S Koubek	**7^{7}**	2	0
WC	(Croatia) G Ivanišević	6^{r}
Q	(Russia) **A Stoliarov**	6
(Slovakia) D Hrbatý	1	**6**	3
3	(Czech Republic) **J Novák**	**6**	3	**6**
7	(Morocco) **Y El Aynaoui**	**6**	**6**
WC	(United Arab Emirates) O Bahrouzyan	0	3
Q	(Uzbekistan) V Kutsenko	6^{5}	2
(Spain) **F López**	**7^{7}**	**6**
(Sweden) J Björkman	2	3
(Spain) **T Robredo**	**6**	**6**
(Germany) A Waske	4	2
2	(Russia) **M Safin**	**6**	**6**

Second round
1	(Switzerland) **R Federer**	**6**	**7**
Q	(Germany) M Abel	4	5
WC	(Morocco) **H Arazi**	**6**	4	**6**
8	(Russia) Y Kafelnikov	4	**6**	3
(Hungary) A Sávolt	4	4
(Croatia) **I Ljubičić**	**6**	**6**
(Belarus) M Mirnyi	6^{6}	**6**	6^{8}
5	(Germany) **R Schüttler**	**7^{8}**	4	**7^{10}**
6	(Netherlands) **S Schalken**	3	**7^{7}**	**7^{7}**
(France) F Santoro	**6**	6^{2}	6^{5}
Q	(Russia) A Stoliarov	1	1
3	(Czech Republic) **J Novák**	**6**	**6**
7	(Morocco) Y El Aynaoui	6^{2}	6^{5}
(Spain) **F López**	**7^{7}**	**7^{7}**
(Spain) **T Robredo**	**7**	4	**7^{7}**
2	(Russia) M Safin	5	**6**	6^{3}

Quarterfinals
1	(Switzerland) **R Federer**	**7**	**6**
WC	(Morocco) H Arazi	5	3
(Croatia) **I Ljubičić**	**6**	**6**
5	(Germany) R Schüttler	3	4
6	(Netherlands) S Schalken	4	4
3	(Czech Republic) **J Novák**	**6**	**6**
(Spain) F López	**7^{7}**	3	4
(Spain) **T Robredo**	6^{4}	**6**	**6**

Semifinals
1	(Switzerland) **R Federer**	**6**	**6**
(Croatia) I Ljubičić	3	2
3	(Czech Republic) **J Novák**	**6**	**6**
(Spain) T Robredo	4	1

Final
1	(Switzerland) **Roger Federer**	**6**	**7^{7}**
3	(Czech Republic) Jiří Novák	1	6^{2}
