= 2003 Priority Telecom Open – Doubles =

Doubles
- 2003 Priority Telecom Open

Final
- Champions: (United States) Devin Bowen (Australia) Ashley Fisher
- Runners-up: (South Africa) Chris Haggard (Brazil) André Sá
- Score: 6–0, 6–4

Events
Singles	Doubles
← 2002 ·	Priority Telecom Open	· 2004 →

Jeff Coetzee and Chris Haggard were the defending champions but only Haggard competed that year with André Sá.

Haggard and Sá lost in the final 6–0, 6–4 against Devin Bowen and Ashley Fisher.

== Seeds ==
1. (Argentina) Lucas Arnold / (Argentina) Mariano Hood (first round)
2. (South Africa) Chris Haggard / (Brazil) André Sá (final)
3. (Sweden) Simon Aspelin / (Italy) Massimo Bertolini (quarterfinals)
4. (United States) Devin Bowen / (Australia) Ashley Fisher (champions)

== Draw ==
=== Key ===
- Q = Qualifier
- WC = Wild card
- LL = Lucky loser
- Alt = Alternate
- SE = Special exempt
- PR = Protected ranking
- ITF = ITF entry
- JE = Junior exempt
- w/o = Walkover
- r = Retired
- d = Defaulted
- SR = Special ranking

First round
1	(Argentina) L Arnold (Argentina) M Hood	6	4	3
(Czech Republic) J Levinský (Czech Republic) D Škoch	1	6	6
(Australia) J Kerr (Belgium) T Vanhoudt	7^{8}	6
WC	(Netherlands) E Kempes (Netherlands) J van Lottum	6^{6}	4
4	(United States) D Bowen (Australia) A Fisher	6	6^{3}	6
(Belgium) C Rochus (Belgium) K Vliegen	2	7^{7}	4
(Netherlands) R Sluiter (Netherlands) M Verkerk	6	6
(Argentina) M Puerta (Argentina) F Squillari	3	1
(Chile) N Massú (Argentina) A Schneiter	7^{7}	3	5
(Spain) J I Carrasco (Sweden) J Landsberg	6^{2}	6	7
(Spain) A Portas (Spain) F Vicente	6^{3}	6^{1}
3	(Italy) S Aspelin (Italy) M Bertolini	7^{7}	7^{7}
(Argentina) J I Chela (Argentina) G Gaudio	6	6
WC	(Netherlands) F Hemmes Jr. (Netherlands) D van Scheppingen	1	3
(Morocco) H Arazi (Spain) Á López Morón	4	6	6^{7}
2	(South Africa) C Haggard (Brazil) A Sá	6	4	7^{9}

Quarterfinals
(Czech Republic) J Levinský (Czech Republic) D Škoch	6	7
(Australia) J Kerr (Belgium) T Vanhoudt	3	5
4	(United States) D Bowen (Australia) A Fisher	w/o
(Netherlands) R Sluiter (Netherlands) M Verkerk
(Spain) J I Carrasco (Sweden) J Landsberg	6	2
3	(Sweden) S Aspelin (Italy) M Bertolini	1	1^{r}
(Argentina) J I Chela (Argentina) G Gaudio	4	7^{7}	3
2	(South Africa) C Haggard (Brazil) A Sá	6	6^{5}	6

Semifinals
(Czech Republic) J Levinský (Czech Republic) D Škoch	7	3	4
4	(United States) D Bowen (Australia) A Fisher	5	6	6
(Spain) J I Carrasco (Sweden) J Landsberg	2	4
2	(South Africa) C Haggard (Brazil) A Sá	6	6

Final
4	(United States) D Bowen (Australia) A Fisher	6	6
2	(South Africa) C Haggard (Brazil) A Sá	0	4
