= 2003 Allianz Suisse Open Gstaad – Doubles =

Doubles
- 2003 Allianz Suisse Open Gstaad

Final
- Champions: (India) Leander Paes (Czech Republic) David Rikl
- Runners-up: (Czech Republic) František Čermák (Czech Republic) Leoš Friedl
- Score: 6–3, 6–3

Details
- Draw: 16
- Seeds: 4

Events
Singles	Doubles
- Swiss Open

Joshua Eagle and David Rikl were the defending champions but Eagle chose not to compete this year. Rikl instead competed with Leander Paes.

Rikl defended his title with Paes, defeating František Čermák and Leoš Friedl in the final, 6–3, 6–3.

== Seeds ==
Champion seeds are indicated in bold text while text in italics indicates the round in which those seeds were eliminated.

1. (India) **Leander Paes** / (Czech Republic) **David Rikl (champions)**
2. (Australia) Wayne Arthurs / (Australia) Paul Hanley (first round)
3. (Czech Republic) Tomáš Cibulec / (Czech Republic) Cyril Suk (first round)
4. (Czech Republic) František Čermák / (Czech Republic) Leoš Friedl (final)

== Draw ==
Key

- Q = Qualifier
- WC = Wild card
- LL = Lucky loser
- Alt = Alternate
- ITF = ITF entry
- PR = Protected ranking
- SR = Special ranking
- SE = Special exempt
- JE = Junior exempt
- JR = Junior Accelerator Programme entrant
- CO = College Accelerator Programme entrant
- NG = Next Gen Accelerator Program entrant
- w/o = Walkover
- r = Retired
- d = Defaulted

First round
1	(India) **L Paes** (Czech Republic) **D Rikl**	**6**	**6**
(Czech Republic) P Luxa (Czech Republic) D Škoch	2	3
(Argentina) **S Prieto** (Brazil) **A Sá**	**6**	**7^{7}**
(Slovakia) K Beck (Russia) N Davydenko	2	6^{3}
3	(Czech Republic) T Cibulec (Czech Republic) C Suk	4	**7^{8}**	3
(Czech Republic) **P Pála** (Czech Republic) **P Vízner**	**6**	6^{6}	**6**
(Germany) **K Braasch** (Armenia) **S Sargsian**	**6**	3	**7**
(Germany) T Behrend (Spain) D Sánchez	3	**6**	5
WC	(Austria) S Koubek (Hungary) A Sávolt	1^{r}
WC	(Switzerland) **M Lammer** (Switzerland) **S Wawrinka**	2
(France) A Dupuis (France) P-H Mathieu	**6**	6^{3}	2
4	(Czech Republic) **F Čermák** (Czech Republic) **L Friedl**	3	**7^{7}**	**6**
(Argentina) J I Chela (Argentina) G Gaudio	5	3
(Czech Republic) **J Novák** (Czech Republic) **R Štěpánek**	**7**	**6**
(Switzerland) **M Kratochvil** (Germany) **R Schüttler**	**6**	**6**
2	(Australia) W Arthurs (Australia) P Hanley	3	2

Quarterfinals
1	(India) **L Paes** (Czech Republic) **D Rikl**	**6**	**6**
(Argentina) S Prieto (Brazil) A Sá	2	3
(Czech Republic) **P Pála** (Czech Republic) **P Vízner**	**6**	3	**7^{7}**
(Germany) K Braasch (Armenia) S Sargsian	3	**6**	6^{3}
WC	(Switzerland) M Lammer (Switzerland) S Wawrinka	2	4
4	(Czech Republic) **F Čermák** (Czech Republic) **L Friedl**	**6**	**6**
(Czech Republic) **J Novák** (Czech Republic) **R Štěpánek**	**7**	**7^{7}**
(Switzerland) M Kratochvil (Germany) R Schüttler	5	6^{4}

Semifinals
1	(India) **L Paes** (Czech Republic) **D Rikl**	**6**	**6**
(Czech Republic) P Pála (Czech Republic) P Vízner	2	1
4	(Czech Republic) **F Čermák** (Czech Republic) **L Friedl**	w/o
(Czech Republic) J Novák (Czech Republic) R Štěpánek

Final
1	(India) **L Paes** (Czech Republic) **D Rikl**	**6**	**6**
4	(Czech Republic) F Čermák (Czech Republic) L Friedl	3	3
