= Zhu Benqiang =

Chinese tennis player

Zhu Benqiang 朱本强
- Full name: Zhu Benqiang
- Country (sports): China
- Born: 13 March 1979 (age 47) Hubei, China
- Plays: Right-handed (Double handed backhand)
- Prize money: $79,836

Singles
- Career record: 14–13
- Career titles: 0
- Highest ranking: No. 276 (19 May 2003)

Doubles
- Career record: 5–7
- Career titles: 0
- Highest ranking: No. 131 (9 August 2004)
Medal record
Representing China
Summer Universiade
Gold medal – first place	2001 Beijing	Mixed doubles
Bronze medal – third place	1999 Palma de Mallorca	Mixed doubles

Zhu Benqiang (Chinese: 朱本强; pinyin: Zhū Běnqiáng; Mandarin pronunciation: [ʈʂú pə̀n tɕʰjǎŋ]; born 13 March 1979) is a former professional tennis player from the People's Republic of China.

== Biography ==
Zhu, a right-handed player from Hubei, was a regular member of the China Davis Cup team from 1999 to 2005. He played in a total of 15 ties and competed in 30 matches, for 19 wins. One of his wins was a rare triple bagel, over Kuwait's Musaad Al-Jazzaf in Shenzhen in 2002. He won China the Asia/Oceania Zone Group II final against South Korea in 2004 when he came from two sets down to defeat Young-Jun Kim in the fifth and decisive match.

He won a gold medal with Li Na in the mixed doubles at the 2001 Summer Universiade and competed in the 2002 Asian Games.

His best performance on the ATP Tour was in the doubles at the 2003 Shanghai Open. He and partner Zeng Shaoxuan became the first players from China to reach a tour-level doubles final. They lost the final to Wayne Arthurs and Paul Hanley.

== ATP Tour career finals ==
=== Doubles: 1 (0–1) ===
Outcome	No.	Year	Tournament	Surface	Partner	Opponents	Score
Runner-up	1.	2003	Shanghai, China	Hard	(China) Zeng Shaoxuan	(Australia) Wayne Arthurs (Australia) Paul Hanley	2–6, 4–6
