= 2001 Stella Artois Championships =

- Date: 11–17 June
- Edition: 99th
- Category: International Series
- Draw: 56S / 28D
- Prize money: $775,000
- Surface: Grass / outdoor
- Location: London, United Kingdom
- Venue: Queen's Club

Champions

Singles
- (Australia) Lleyton Hewitt

Doubles
- (United States) Bob Bryan / (United States) Mike Bryan
| ← 2000 · | Queen's Club Championships | · 2002 → |

The 2001 Stella Artois Championships was a men's tennis tournament played on grass courts at the Queen's Club in London, United Kingdom and was part of the International Series of the 2001 ATP Tour. It was the 99th edition of the tournament and was held from 11 June until 17 June 2001. Third-seeded Lleyton Hewitt won his second consecutive singles title at the event.

== Finals ==
=== Singles ===
(Australia) Lleyton Hewitt defeated (United Kingdom) Tim Henman 7–6^{(7–3)}, 7–6^{(7–3)}

- It was Hewitt's 2nd title of the year and the 10th of his career.

=== Doubles ===
(United States) Bob Bryan / (United States) Mike Bryan defeated (Philippines) Eric Taino / (United States) David Wheaton 6–3, 6–2

- It was Bob Bryan's 2nd title of the year and the 2nd of his career. It was Mike Bryan's 2nd title of the year and the 2nd of his career.
