= 2002 Stella Artois Championships =

- Date: 10–16 June
- Edition: 100th
- Category: International Series
- Draw: 56S / 28D
- Prize money: $736,000
- Surface: Grass / outdoor
- Location: London, United Kingdom
- Venue: Queen's Club

Champions

Singles
- (Australia) Lleyton Hewitt

Doubles
- (Zimbabwe) Wayne Black / (Zimbabwe) Kevin Ullyett
← 2001 ·	Queen's Club Championships	· 2003 →

The 2002 Stella Artois Championships was a men's tennis tournament played on grass courts at the Queen's Club in London in the United Kingdom and was part of the International Series of the 2002 ATP Tour. It was the 100th edition of the tournament and was held from 10 June through 16 June 2002. First-seeded Lleyton Hewitt won his third consecutive singles title at the event.

== Finals ==
=== Singles ===
(Australia) Lleyton Hewitt defeated (United Kingdom) Tim Henman 4–6, 6–1, 6–4

- It was Hewitt's 3rd title of the year and the 17th of his career.

=== Doubles ===
(Zimbabwe) Wayne Black / (Zimbabwe) Kevin Ullyett defeated (India) Mahesh Bhupathi / (Belarus) Max Mirnyi 7–6^{(7–5)}, 3–6, 6–3

- It was Black's 3rd title of the year and the 10th of his career. It was Ullyett's 3rd title of the year and the 16th of his career.
