= 2001 Stella Artois Championships – Doubles =

Doubles
- 2001 Stella Artois Championships

Final
- Champions: (United States) Bob Bryan (United States) Mike Bryan
- Runners-up: (United States) Eric Taino (United States) David Wheaton
- Score: 6–3, 3–6, 6–1

Details
- Draw: 28

Events
| Singles | Doubles |
| ← 2000 · | Queen's Club Championships | · 2002 → |

Todd Woodbridge and Mark Woodforde were the defending champions but only Woodbridge competed that year with Wayne Ferreira.

Ferreira and Woodbridge lost in the quarterfinals to Bob Bryan and Mike Bryan.

The Bryans won in the final 6–3, 3–6, 6–1 against Eric Taino and David Wheaton.

== Seeds ==
The top four seeded teams received byes into the second round.

1. (South Africa) Wayne Ferreira / (Australia) Todd Woodbridge (quarterfinals)
2. (United States) Donald Johnson / (United States) Jared Palmer (semifinals)
3. (South Africa) Ellis Ferreira / (United States) Rick Leach (second round)
4. (Australia) Michael Hill / (United States) Jeff Tarango (quarterfinals)
5. (Zimbabwe) Byron Black / (United States) Alex O'Brien (quarterfinals)
6. (South Africa) David Adams / (Russia) Andrei Olhovskiy (quarterfinals)
7. (India) Mahesh Bhupathi / (India) Leander Paes (semifinals)
8. (United States) Bob Bryan / (United States) Mike Bryan (champions)

== Draw ==
=== Key ===
- Q = Qualifier
- WC = Wild card
- LL = Lucky loser
- Alt = Alternate
- SE = Special exempt
- PR = Protected ranking
- ITF = ITF entry
- JE = Junior exempt
- w/o = Walkover
- r = Retired
- d = Defaulted
- SR = Special ranking

=== Finals ===
Semifinals
8 | (United States) Bob Bryan (United States) Mike Bryan | 7^{7} | 6
7 | (India) Mahesh Bhupathi (India) Leander Paes | 6^{4} | 4
Q | (United States) Eric Taino (United States) David Wheaton | 7 | 6
2 | (United States) Donald Johnson (United States) Jared Palmer | 5 | 4

Final
8 | (United States) Bob Bryan (United States) Mike Bryan | 6 | 3 | 6
Q | (United States) Eric Taino (United States) David Wheaton | 3 | 6 | 1

=== Top half ===
First round
Q | (Israel) J Erlich (Israel) A Ram | 6 | 6
(South Africa) B Haygarth (South Africa) R Koenig | 3 | 4
(Czech Republic) T Cibulec (Czech Republic) L Friedl | 2 | 6 | 6
(Australia) N Healey (Australia) L Hewitt | 6 | 4 | 4
WC | (Russia) M Safin (Belarus) V Voltchkov | 3 | 6^{3}
8 | (United States) B Bryan (United States) M Bryan | 6 | 7^{7}
(Australia) P Hanley (Australia) A Kratzmann | 7 | 6
WC | (Belgium) O Rochus (Russia) M Youzhny | 5 | 3
WC | (United Kingdom) M Lee (United Kingdom) A Parmar | 6^{5} | 6 | 6
(South Africa) M Barnard (United States) J Thomas | 7^{7} | 4 | 4
(South Africa) N Godwin (United States) J Waite | 3 | 6 | 4
7 | (India) M Bhupathi (India) L Paes | 6 | 3 | 6

Second round
1 | (South Africa) W Ferreira (Australia) T Woodbridge | 7^{15} | 4 | 6
Q | (Israel) J Erlich (Israel) A Ram | 6^{13} | 6 | 2
(Czech Republic) T Cibulec (Czech Republic) L Friedl | 3 | 2
8 | (United States) B Bryan (United States) M Bryan | 6 | 6
4 | (Australia) M Hill (United States) J Tarango | 7 | 7
(Australia) P Hanley (Australia) A Kratzmann | 5 | 5
WC | (United Kingdom) M Lee (United Kingdom) A Parmar | 2 | 4
7 | (India) M Bhupathi (India) L Paes | 6 | 6

Quarterfinals
1 | (South Africa) W Ferreira (Australia) T Woodbridge | 4 | 2
8 | (United States) B Bryan (United States) M Bryan | 6 | 6
4 | (Australia) M Hill (United States) J Tarango | 6^{4} | 6^{9}
7 | (India) M Bhupathi (India) L Paes | 7^{7} | 7^{11}

Semifinals
8 | (United States) B Bryan (United States) M Bryan | 7^{7} | 6
7 | (India) M Bhupathi (India) L Paes | 6^{4} | 4

=== Bottom half ===
First round
5 | (Zimbabwe) B Black (United States) A O'Brien | 6 | 6^{6} | 6
(Czech Republic) M Damm (Czech Republic) C Suk | 1 | 7^{8} | 2
(Sweden) S Aspelin (Sweden) J Landsberg | 4 | 7^{7} | 6
(Australia) P Kilderry (Israel) E Ran | 6 | 6^{2} | 3
(South Africa) J-L de Jager (United States) J Stark | 4 | 7^{7} | 5
Q | (United States) E Taino (United States) D Wheaton | 6 | 6^{4} | 7
6 | (South Africa) D Adams (Russia) A Olhovskiy | 6 | 6
(Germany) J Knippschild (South Africa) J Weir-Smith | 4 | 3
(Australia) W Arthurs (Australia) B Ellwood | 6^{4} | 6 | 6
(Canada) S Lareau (France) M Llodra | 7^{7} | 3 | 3
(United States) J Gimelstob (United States) S Humphries | 6 | 3 | 4
WC | (United States) J-M Gambill (Croatia) G Ivanišević | 4 | 6 | 6

Second round
5 | (Zimbabwe) B Black (United States) A O'Brien | 6 | 6
(Sweden) S Aspelin (Sweden) J Landsberg | 3 | 4
Q | (United States) E Taino (United States) D Wheaton | 7^{7} | 6
3 | (South Africa) E Ferreira (United States) R Leach | 6^{4} | 1
6 | (South Africa) D Adams (Russia) A Olhovskiy | 7^{7} | 3 | 7^{7}
(Australia) W Arthurs (Australia) B Ellwood | 6^{3} | 6 | 6^{5}
WC | (United States) J-M Gambill (Croatia) G Ivanišević | 5 | 4
2 | (United States) D Johnson (United States) J Palmer | 7 | 6

Quarterfinals
5 | (Zimbabwe) B Black (United States) A O'Brien | 3 | 2
Q | (United States) E Taino (United States) D Wheaton | 6 | 6
6 | (South Africa) D Adams (Russia) A Olhovskiy | 6^{8} | 3
2 | (United States) D Johnson (United States) J Palmer | 7^{10} | 6

Semifinals
Q | (United States) E Taino (United States) D Wheaton | 7 | 6
2 | (United States) D Johnson (United States) J Palmer | 5 | 4
