= 2002 Stella Artois Championships – Doubles =

Doubles
- 2002 Stella Artois Championships

Final
- Champions: (Zimbabwe) Wayne Black (Zimbabwe) Kevin Ullyett
- Runners-up: (India) Mahesh Bhupathi (Belarus) Max Mirnyi
- Score: 7–5, 6–3

Details
- Draw: 28

Events
Singles	Doubles
← 2001 ·	Queen's Club Championships	· 2003 →

Bob Bryan and Mike Bryan were the defending champions but lost in the first round to Christophe Rochus and Olivier Rochus.

Wayne Black and Kevin Ullyett won in the final 7–5, 6–3 against Mahesh Bhupathi and Max Mirnyi.

== Seeds ==
The top four seeded teams received byes into the second round.

1. (United States) Donald Johnson / (United States) Jared Palmer (semifinals)
2. (The Bahamas) Mark Knowles / (Canada) Daniel Nestor (semifinals)
3. (India) Mahesh Bhupathi / (Belarus) Max Mirnyi (final)
4. (Zimbabwe) Wayne Black / (Zimbabwe) Kevin Ullyett (champions)
5. (United States) Bob Bryan / (United States) Mike Bryan (first round)
6. (France) Michaël Llodra / (India) Leander Paes (quarterfinals)
7. (Australia) Michael Hill / (Czech Republic) Daniel Vacek (second round)
8. (South Africa) John-Laffnie de Jager / (Netherlands) Sjeng Schalken (first round)

== Draw ==
=== Key ===
- Q = Qualifier
- WC = Wild card
- LL = Lucky loser
- Alt = Alternate
- SE = Special exempt
- PR = Protected ranking
- ITF = ITF entry
- JE = Junior exempt
- w/o = Walkover
- r = Retired
- d = Defaulted
- SR = Special ranking

=== Finals ===
Semifinals
1	(United States) Donald Johnson (United States) Jared Palmer	5	7^{7}	6^{5}
4	(Zimbabwe) Wayne Black (Zimbabwe) Kevin Ullyett	7	6^{3}	7^{7}
3	(India) Mahesh Bhupathi (Belarus) Max Mirnyi	6	7^{7}
2	(The Bahamas) Mark Knowles (Canada) Daniel Nestor	4	6^{4}

Final
4	(Zimbabwe) Wayne Black (Zimbabwe) Kevin Ullyett	7	6
3	(India) Mahesh Bhupathi (Belarus) Max Mirnyi	5	3

=== Top half ===
First round
(Czech Republic) L Friedl (Czech Republic) P Luxa	6	5	6
(Australia) A Florent (Australia) D Macpherson	3	7	4
(Argentina) M Rodríguez (Belgium) T Vanhoudt	4	4
(South Africa) M Barnard (South Africa) M Wakefield	6	6
(United States) J Blake (Belgium) X Malisse	6	4	3
7	(Australia) M Hill (Czech Republic) D Vacek	2	6	6
(Zimbabwe) B Black (South Africa) R Koenig	7	6
(Argentina) M García (South Africa) C Haggard	5	4
WC	(Australia) S Draper (Australia) L Hewitt	6	3	4
(South Africa) D Adams (South Africa) W Ferreira	4	6	6
(Belgium) C Rochus (Belgium) O Rochus	1	7^{7}	6
8	(South Africa) J-L de Jager (Netherlands) S Schalken	6	6^{4}	3

Second round
1	(United States) D Johnson (United States) J Palmer	6	7
(Czech Republic) L Friedl (Czech Republic) P Luxa	3	5
(South Africa) M Barnard (South Africa) M Wakefield	3	7^{7}	6
7	(Australia) M Hill (Czech Republic) D Vacek	6	6^{4}	1
4	(Zimbabwe) W Black (Zimbabwe) K Ullyett	6	5	6
(Zimbabwe) B Black (South Africa) R Koenig	3	7	2
(South Africa) D Adams (South Africa) W Ferreira	6	6
(Belgium) C Rochus (Belgium) O Rochus	1	4

Quarterfinals
1	(United States) D Johnson (United States) J Palmer	6	6
(South Africa) M Barnard (South Africa) M Wakefield	3	3
4	(Zimbabwe) W Black (Zimbabwe) K Ullyett	w/o
(South Africa) D Adams (South Africa) W Ferreira

Semifinals
1	(United States) D Johnson (United States) J Palmer	5	7^{7}	6^{5}
4	(Zimbabwe) W Black (Zimbabwe) K Ullyett	7	6^{3}	7^{7}

=== Bottom half ===
First round
5	(United States) B Bryan (United States) M Bryan	3	6	6
WC	(United States) M Fish (United States) J Morrison	6	3	4
(Australia) S Huss (Australia) A Kratzmann	4	3
(Australia) B Ellwood (Austria) J Knowle	6	6
(United States) D Bowen (United States) J Thomas	6	4	4
(North Macedonia) A Kitinov (Sweden) J Landsberg	3	6	6
6	(France) M Llodra (India) L Paes	4	6	7^{8}
(Australia) W Arthurs (Australia) P Hanley	6	3	6^{6}
WC	(United Kingdom) M Lee (United Kingdom) A Parmar	3	6	6
(Sweden) T Enqvist (United States) J-M Gambill	6	3	4
(Australia) M Philippoussis (France) C Pioline	6^{3}	6	6^{5}
(United States) J Gimelstob (Japan) T Shimada	7^{7}	3	7^{7}

Second round
WC	(United States) M Fish (United States) J Morrison	6	3	6
(Australia) B Ellwood (Austria) J Knowle	1	6	1
(North Macedonia) A Kitinov (Sweden) J Landsberg	3	7^{8}	5
3	(India) M Bhupathi (Belarus) M Mirnyi	6	6^{6}	7
6	(France) M Llodra (India) L Paes	6	6
WC	(United Kingdom) M Lee (United Kingdom) A Parmar	3	2
(United States) J Gimelstob (Japan) T Shimada	4	5
2	(The Bahamas) M Knowles (Canada) D Nestor	6	7

Quarterfinals
WC	(United States) M Fish (United States) J Morrison	6^{5}	6	3
3	(India) M Bhupathi (Belarus) M Mirnyi	7^{7}	3	6
6	(France) M Llodra (India) L Paes	5	3
2	(The Bahamas) M Knowles (Canada) D Nestor	7	6

Semifinals
3	(India) M Bhupathi (Belarus) M Mirnyi	6	7^{7}
2	(The Bahamas) M Knowles (Canada) D Nestor	4	6^{4}
