= 2002 Stella Artois Championships – Singles =

Singles
- 2002 Stella Artois Championships

Final
- Champion: (Australia) Lleyton Hewitt
- Runner-up: (United Kingdom) Tim Henman
- Score: 4–6, 6–1, 6–4

Details
- Draw: 56
- Seeds: 16

Events
Singles	Doubles
← 2001 ·	Queen's Club Championships	· 2003 →

Lleyton Hewitt was the two-time defending champion and won in the final 4–6, 6–1, 6–4 against Tim Henman. This was the prelude to him winning the Wimbledon title the following fortnight.

== Seeds ==
The top eight seeds received a bye to the second round.

1. (Australia) Lleyton Hewitt (champion)
2. (United Kingdom) Tim Henman (final)
3. (Sweden) Thomas Enqvist (second round)
4. (Belarus) Max Mirnyi (second round)
5. (Netherlands) Sjeng Schalken (semifinals)
6. (United Kingdom) Greg Rusedski (second round)
7. (United States) James Blake (second round)
8. (Belgium) Xavier Malisse (third round)
9. (United States) Todd Martin (quarterfinals)
10. (South Africa) Wayne Ferreira (quarterfinals, retired)
11. (Finland) Jarkko Nieminen (first round)
12. (United States) Jan-Michael Gambill (third round)
13. (Romania) Adrian Voinea (second round)
14. (Belgium) Olivier Rochus (third round)
15. (Thailand) Paradorn Srichaphan (first round)
16. (Armenia) Sargis Sargsian (second round)

== Draw ==
=== Key ===
- Q = Qualifier
- WC = Wild card
- LL = Lucky loser
- Alt = Alternate
- SE = Special exempt
- PR = Protected ranking
- ITF = ITF entry
- JE = Junior exempt
- w/o = Walkover
- r = Retired
- d = Defaulted
- SR = Special ranking

=== Finals ===
Semifinals
1	(Australia) Lleyton Hewitt	7^{7}	6
5	(Netherlands) Sjeng Schalken	6^{5}	3
(Netherlands) Raemon Sluiter	7^{7}	4	2
2	(United Kingdom) Tim Henman	6^{5}	6	6

Final
1	(Australia) Lleyton Hewitt	4	6	6
2	(United Kingdom) Tim Henman	6	1	4

=== Top half ===
==== Section 1 ====
First round
Q	(United States) M Fish	6	6
(Brazil) A Sá	3	4
(Belgium) C Rochus	1	1
(Israel) H Levy	6	6
(Israel) N Okun	6	6^{7}	4
14	(Belgium) O Rochus	2	7^{9}	6
9	(United States) T Martin	6	6^{6}	7^{8}
(Paraguay) R Delgado	2	7^{8}	6^{6}
(United States) J Morrison	6	6
(Australia) A Ilie	3	1
WC	(United Kingdom) J Delgado	4	6^{0}
(United States) C Mamiit	6	7^{7}

Second round
1	(Australia) L Hewitt	7	6
Q	(United States) M Fish	5	3
(Israel) H Levy	4	0
14	(Belgium) O Rochus	6	6
9	(United States) T Martin	6	6
(United States) J Morrison	3	3
(United States) C Mamiit	4	0
8	(Belgium) X Malisse	6	6

Third round
1	(Australia) L Hewitt	6	6
14	(Belgium) O Rochus	2	1
9	(United States) T Martin	7	6
8	(Belgium) X Malisse	5	3

Quarterfinals
1	(Australia) L Hewitt	7^{7}	7
9	(United States) T Martin	6^{4}	5

==== Section 2 ====
First round
Q	(France) J-F Bachelot	5	1
(United States) M Russell	7	6
(France) N Coutelot	6^{5}	3
(Australia) W Arthurs	7^{7}	6
(Austria) J Knowle	6^{8}	1
16	(Armenia) S Sargsian	7^{10}	6
12	(United States) J-M Gambill	7	6
(United States) M Chang	5	3
(France) C Pioline	4	4
Q	(United States) M Bryan	6	6
Q	(Croatia) I Karlović	6^{6}	6	3
(Czech Republic) J Vacek	7^{8}	4	6

Second round
3	(Sweden) T Enqvist	3	5
(United States) M Russell	6	7
(Australia) W Arthurs	6	6
16	(Armenia) S Sargsian	2	3
12	(United States) J-M Gambill	6	6
Q	(United States) M Bryan	3	4
(Czech Republic) J Vacek	4	2
5	(Netherlands) S Schalken	6	6

Third round
(United States) M Russell	4	6	5
(Australia) W Arthurs	6	3	7
12	(United States) J-M Gambill	6^{4}	6	4
5	(Netherlands) S Schalken	7^{7}	1	6

Quarterfinals
(Australia) W Arthurs	3	6^{4}
5	(Netherlands) S Schalken	6	7^{7}

=== Bottom half ===
==== Section 3 ====
First round
(United Kingdom) M Lee	1	5
(Australia) M Philippoussis	6	7
Q	(Belgium) G Elseneer	6	6
WC	(United Kingdom) A Bogdanovic	3	2
(Georgia (country)) I Labadze	4	2
10	(South Africa) W Ferreira	6	6
13	(Romania) A Voinea	2	6	6
Q	(France) G Carraz	6	4	4
(Switzerland) G Bastl	6^{5}	3
(Slovakia) K Kučera	7^{7}	6
(Netherlands) R Sluiter	6	6^{5}	6
(United States) T Dent	3	7^{7}	3

Second round
6	(United Kingdom) G Rusedski	7^{7}	6^{3}	6^{5}
(Australia) M Philippoussis	6^{1}	7^{7}	7^{7}
Q	(Belgium) G Elseneer	4	7^{8}	1
10	(South Africa) W Ferreira	6	6^{6}	6
13	(Romania) A Voinea	2	4
(Slovakia) K Kučera	6	6
(Netherlands) R Sluiter	7^{11}	6
4	(Belarus) M Mirnyi	6^{9}	3

Third round
(Australia) M Philippoussis	6^{5}	6	6^{5}
10	(South Africa) W Ferreira	7^{7}	4	7^{7}
(Slovakia) K Kučera	1^{r}
(Netherlands) R Sluiter	3

Quarterfinals
10	(South Africa) W Ferreira	1	4^{r}
(Netherlands) R Sluiter	6	5

==== Section 4 ====
First round
(United States) V Spadea	7^{7}	7
(France) M Llodra	6^{5}	5
(Sweden) M Larsson	3	7^{7}	6^{1}
(South Korea) H-T Lee	6	6^{4}	7^{7}
Q	(Japan) G Motomura	6	6
11	(Finland) J Nieminen	2	4
15	(Thailand) P Srichaphan	4	6	4
WC	(United States) R Ginepri	6	0	6
(Switzerland) M Rosset	7^{7}	6
WC	(United Kingdom) A Parmar	6^{4}	3
WC	(France) R Gasquet	6^{4}	7	3
(South Africa) N Godwin	7^{7}	5	6

Second round
7	(United States) J Blake	3	4
(United States) V Spadea	6	6
(South Korea) H-T Lee	6	6
Q	(Japan) G Motomura	4	0
WC	(United States) R Ginepri	4	7	6
(Switzerland) M Rosset	6	5	4
(South Africa) N Godwin	4	6^{4}
2	(United Kingdom) T Henman	6	7^{7}

Third round
(United States) V Spadea	4	3
(South Korea) H-T Lee	6	6
WC	(United States) R Ginepri	1	2
2	(United Kingdom) T Henman	6	6

Quarterfinals
(South Korea) H-T Lee	6	2	2
2	(United Kingdom) T Henman	3	6	6
