= 2001 Tennis Masters Cup – Singles =

Singles
- 2001 Tennis Masters Cup

Final
- Champion: (Australia) Lleyton Hewitt
- Runner-up: (France) Sébastien Grosjean
- Score: 6–3, 6–3, 6–4

Details
- Draw: 8

Events
Singles	Doubles
- ATP Finals

Lleyton Hewitt defeated Sébastien Grosjean in the final, 6–3, 6–3, 6–4 to win the singles tennis title at the 2001 Tennis Masters Cup. With his round-robin victory against Pat Rafter, Hewitt secured the year-end world No. 1 ranking for the first time. Gustavo Kuerten and Andre Agassi were in contention for the number 1 ranking before the tournament.

Kuerten was the defending champion, but was eliminated in the round-robin stage.

== Seeds ==
A champion seed is indicated in bold text while text in italics indicates the round in which that seed was eliminated.

1. (Brazil) Gustavo Kuerten (round robin)
2. (Australia) **Lleyton Hewitt (champion)**
3. (United States) Andre Agassi (round robin)
4. (Spain) Juan Carlos Ferrero (semifinals)
5. (Russia) Yevgeny Kafelnikov (semifinals)
6. (Australia) Patrick Rafter (round robin)
7. (France) Sébastien Grosjean (final)
8. (Croatia) Goran Ivanišević (round robin)

== Alternate ==
1. (Germany) Tommy Haas (Did not play)

== Draw ==
Key

- Q = Qualifier
- WC = Wild card
- LL = Lucky loser
- Alt = Alternate
- ITF = ITF entry
- PR = Protected ranking
- SR = Special ranking
- SE = Special exempt
- JE = Junior exempt
- JR = Junior Accelerator Programme entrant
- CO = College Accelerator Programme entrant
- NG = Next Gen Accelerator Program entrant
- w/o = Walkover
- r = Retired
- d = Defaulted

=== Finals ===
Semifinals
5	(Russia) Yevgeny Kafelnikov	4	2
7	(France) **Sébastien Grosjean**	**6**	**6**
2	(Australia) **Lleyton Hewitt**	**6**	**6**
4	(Spain) Juan Carlos Ferrero	3	3

Final
7	(France) Sébastien Grosjean	3	3	4
2	(Australia) **Lleyton Hewitt**	**6**	**6**	**6**

=== Rosewall group ===
		(Brazil) Kuerten	(Spain) **Ferrero**	(Russia) **Kafelnikov**	(Croatia) Ivanišević	RR; W–L	Set; W–L	Game; W–L	Standings
1	(Brazil) Gustavo Kuerten		6–7^{(3–7)}, 2–6	2–6, 6–4, 3–6	2–6, 7–6^{(7–2)}, 4–6	0–3	2–6	32–47	4
4	(Spain) **Juan Carlos Ferrero**	**7–6^{(7–3)}, 6–2**		6–4, 1–6, 6–7^{(5–7)}	**7–6^{(7–4)}, 7–6^{(7–5)}**	**2–1**	**5–2**	**40–37**	**2**
5	(Russia) **Yevgeny Kafelnikov**	**6–2, 4–6, 6–3**	**4–6, 6–1, 7–6^{(7–5)}**		**6–3, 6–4**	**3–0**	**6–2**	**45–31**	**1**
8	(Croatia) Goran Ivanišević	**6–2, 6–7^{(2–7)}, 6–4**	6–7^{(4–7)}, 6–7^{(5–7)}	3–6, 4–6		1–2	2–5	37–39	3

Standings are determined by: 1. number of wins; 2. number of matches; 3. in two-players-ties, head-to-head records; 4. in three-players-ties, percentage of sets won, or of games won; 5. steering-committee decision.

=== Newcombe group ===
		(Australia) **Hewitt**	(United States) Agassi	(Australia) Rafter	(France) **Grosjean**	RR; W–L	Set; W–L	Game; W–L	Standings
2	(Australia) **Lleyton Hewitt**		**6–3, 6–4**	**7–5, 6–2**	**3–6, 6–2, 6–3**	**3–0**	**6–1**	**40–25**	**1**
3	(United States) Andre Agassi	3–6, 4–6		**6–2, 6–4**	3–6, 4–6	1–2	2–4	26–30	3
6	(Australia) Patrick Rafter	5–7, 2–6	2–6, 4–6		6–7^{(4–7)}, 3–6	0–3	0–6	22–38	4
7	(France) **Sébastien Grosjean**	6–3, 2–6, 3–6	**6–3, 6–4**	**7–6^{(7–4)}, 6–3**		**2–1**	**5–2**	**36–31**	**2**

Standings are determined by: 1. number of wins; 2. number of matches; 3. in two-players-ties, head-to-head records; 4. in three-players-ties, percentage of sets won, or of games won; 5. steering-committee decision.

== See also ==
- ATP World Tour Finals appearances
