= 2001 Stella Artois Championships – Singles =

Singles
- 2001 Stella Artois Championships

Final
- Champion: (Australia) Lleyton Hewitt
- Runner-up: (United Kingdom) Tim Henman
- Score: 7–6^{(7–3)}, 7–6^{(7–3)}

Details
- Draw: 56
- Seeds: 16

Events
Singles	Doubles
← 2000 ·	Queen's Club Championships	· 2002 →

Lleyton Hewitt was the defending champion and won in the final 7–6^{(7–3)}, 7–6^{(7–3)} against Tim Henman.

== Seeds ==
The top eight seeds received a bye to the second round.

1. (Russia) Marat Safin (third round)
2. (United States) Pete Sampras (semifinals)
3. (Australia) Lleyton Hewitt (champion)
4. (United Kingdom) Tim Henman (final)
5. (Sweden) Thomas Enqvist (second round)
6. (United States) Jan-Michael Gambill (quarterfinals)
7. (South Africa) Wayne Ferreira (semifinals)
8. (Belarus) Vladimir Voltchkov (third round)
9. (Sweden) Andreas Vinciguerra (first round)
10. (Israel) Harel Levy (first round)
11. (United States) Andy Roddick (first round)
12. (United Kingdom) Greg Rusedski (quarterfinals)
13. (France) Cédric Pioline (second round)
14. (Sweden) Magnus Gustafsson (second round)
15. (Italy) Davide Sanguinetti (first round)
16. (Australia) Wayne Arthurs (third round)

== Draw ==
=== Key ===
- Q = Qualifier
- WC = Wild card
- LL = Lucky loser
- Alt = Alternate
- SE = Special exempt
- PR = Protected ranking
- ITF = ITF entry
- JE = Junior exempt
- w/o = Walkover
- r = Retired
- d = Defaulted
- SR = Special ranking

=== Finals ===
Semifinals
7	(South Africa) Wayne Ferreira	7	4	2
4	(United Kingdom) Tim Henman	5	6	6
3	(Australia) Lleyton Hewitt	3	6	6
2	(United States) Pete Sampras	6	3	2

Final
4	(United Kingdom) Tim Henman	6^{3}	6^{3}
3	(Australia) Lleyton Hewitt	7^{7}	7^{7}

=== Top half ===
==== Section 1 ====
First round
(Russia) N Davydenko	4	2
(Germany) J Knippschild	6	6
(Netherlands) P Wessels	6	6
WC	(United Kingdom) M Lee	2	3
WC	(United Kingdom) L Childs	6^{4}	2
14	(Sweden) M Gustafsson	7^{7}	6
11	(United States) A Roddick	6^{5}	3
(Russia) M Youzhny	7^{7}	6
(Netherlands) R Sluiter	6	6
(France) M Llodra	4	3
(Slovakia) K Kučera	7^{9}	7^{9}
Q	(Israel) N Okun	6^{7}	6^{7}

Second round
1	(Russia) M Safin	4	7^{7}	6
(Germany) J Knippschild	6	6^{5}	2
(Netherlands) P Wessels	7	6
14	(Sweden) M Gustafsson	5	4
(Russia) M Youzhny	4	6	4
(Netherlands) R Sluiter	6	2	6
(Slovakia) K Kučera	2	4
7	(South Africa) W Ferreira	6	6

Third round
1	(Russia) M Safin	6	4	6^{8}
(Netherlands) P Wessels	4	6	7^{10}
(Netherlands) R Sluiter	3	3
7	(South Africa) W Ferreira	6	6

Quarterfinals
(Netherlands) P Wessels	3	5
7	(South Africa) W Ferreira	6	7

==== Section 2 ====
First round
(Croatia) G Ivanišević	3	4
Q	(Italy) C Caratti	6	6
(Switzerland) M Rosset	5	3
(Brazil) A Simoni	7	6
(France) A Dupuis	3	4
16	(Australia) W Arthurs	6	6
9	(Sweden) A Vinciguerra	4	3
Q	(Brazil) A Sá	6	6
Q	(Israel) J Erlich	6^{4}	2
(Thailand) P Srichaphan	7^{7}	6
(Germany) C Vinck	2	6	3
Q	(Australia) T Woodbridge	6	4	6

Second round
4	(United Kingdom) T Henman	6	6
Q	(Italy) C Caratti	3	1
(Brazil) A Simoni	2	1
16	(Australia) W Arthurs	6	6
Q	(Brazil) A Sá	6^{9}	1
(Thailand) P Srichaphan	7^{11}	6
Q	(Australia) T Woodbridge	6	6
5	(Sweden) T Enqvist	2	4

Third round
4	(United Kingdom) T Henman	6^{5}	7^{8}	7^{7}
16	(Australia) W Arthurs	7^{7}	6^{6}	6^{4}
(Thailand) P Srichaphan	6	3	6
Q	(Australia) T Woodbridge	4	6	2

Quarterfinals
4	(United Kingdom) T Henman	7^{7}	6
(Thailand) P Srichaphan	6^{4}	3

=== Bottom half ===
==== Section 3 ====
First round
(Armenia) S Sargsian	2	6	7
(Denmark) K Carlsen	6	3	5
WC	(United Kingdom) J Delgado	6	6
(Czech Republic) M Damm	1	4
WC	(United Kingdom) A Parmar	6^{5}	6	2
12	(United Kingdom) G Rusedski	7^{7}	1	6
13	(France) C Pioline	6	7^{13}
(Switzerland) G Bastl	3	6^{11}
(Switzerland) M Kratochvil	3	5
(Zimbabwe) B Black	6	7
(Belgium) X Malisse	7^{8}	6
Q	(United States) T Dent	6^{6}	1

Second round
8	(Belarus) V Voltchkov	6	6
(Armenia) S Sargsian	1	3
WC	(United Kingdom) J Delgado	3	4
12	(United Kingdom) G Rusedski	6	6
13	(France) C Pioline	4	6^{3}
(Zimbabwe) B Black	6	7^{7}
(Belgium) X Malisse	4	3
3	(Australia) L Hewitt	6	6

Third round
8	(Belarus) V Voltchkov	2	2
12	(United Kingdom) G Rusedski	6	6
(Zimbabwe) B Black	3	2
3	(Australia) L Hewitt	6	6

Quarterfinals
12	(United Kingdom) G Rusedski	4	4
3	(Australia) L Hewitt	6	6

==== Section 4 ====
First round
(United States) C Mamiit	1	6^{5}
(United States) J Gimelstob	6	7^{7}
Q	(Belgium) G Elseneer	7	6
(Netherlands) E Kempes	5	3
(Canada) S Lareau	7^{7}	3	6
10	(Israel) H Levy	6^{4}	6	1
15	(Italy) D Sanguinetti	3	6^{3}
(Netherlands) J Siemerink	6	7^{7}
(Italy) G Pozzi	6	6
(United States) C Woodruff	4	2
(Russia) A Stoliarov	2	5
(Belgium) O Rochus	6	7

Second round
6	(United States) J-M Gambill	6	7
(United States) J Gimelstob	3	5
Q	(Belgium) G Elseneer	7^{7}	6
(Canada) S Lareau	6^{2}	3
(Netherlands) J Siemerink	3	6	7
(Italy) G Pozzi	6	3	5
(Belgium) O Rochus	1	2
2	(United States) P Sampras	6	6

Third round
6	(United States) J-M Gambill	6	4	6
Q	(Belgium) G Elseneer	4	6	3
(Netherlands) J Siemerink	3	4
2	(United States) P Sampras	6	6

Quarterfinals
6	(United States) J-M Gambill	6^{1}	5
2	(United States) P Sampras	7^{7}	7
