= Darryl Hewitt =

Australian rules footballer

Personal information
- Full name: Darryl Hewitt
- Born: 29 April 1958 (age 68)
- Height: 180 cm (5 ft 11 in)
- Weight: 72 kg (159 lb)
- Position: Rover

Playing career^{1}
Years	Club	Games (Goals)
1975–1977	West Adelaide	51 (10)
1978–1980	Woodville	66 (78)
1981–1982	St Kilda	26 (20)
1983–1990	South Adelaide	121 (99)
- ^{1} Playing statistics correct to the end of 1990.

Darryl Hewitt (born 29 April 1958) is a former Australian rules footballer who played in the South Australian National Football League (SANFL) and with St Kilda in the Victorian Football League (VFL).

His brother Glynn Hewitt, is also a former Australian rules footballer, and his nephew Lleyton Hewitt, is a former professional tennis player. His great-nephew Cruz Hewitt followed in the latter vocation.
