= Glynn Hewitt =

Australian rules footballer

Personal information
- Full name: Glynn Maxwell Hewitt
- Born: 16 January 1953 (age 73)
- Original team: West Adelaide
- Height: 185 cm (6 ft 1 in)
- Weight: 82 kg (181 lb)
- Position: Forward

Playing career^{1}
Years	Club	Games (Goals)
1970–72; 1975–77	West Adelaide	101 (247)
1973–1974	Richmond	15 (15)
1978–1981	Woodville	80 (201)
1982–1986	South Adelaide	86 (78)

Representative team honours
Years	Team	Games (Goals)
	South Australia	5 (13)
- ^{1} Playing statistics correct to the end of 1974.

Glynn Maxwell Hewitt (born 16 January 1953) is a former Australian rules footballer who played in the South Australian National Football League (SANFL) and Victorian Football League (VFL) during the 1970s.

His brother Darryl Hewitt, was also a footballer.

He is the father of former Australian professional tennis players Lleyton Hewitt and Jaslyn Hewitt-Shehadie, and the grandfather of Cruz Hewitt.

Hewitt was a key position forward and kicked 529 goals in the SANFL, from 285 games. He made his league debut in 1970 at the age of 17 for the West Adelaide Football Club. He would top the Bloods goal kicking twice (1972 and 1976) and would go on to play 101 games and kick 248 goals for the club.

In 1973 and 1974 he played in the VFL with Richmond Football Club and although he could not bring with him his prolific goal-kicking from South Australia he did once manage five goals in a game against Fitzroy. He would play in the Tigers' 1973 Reserve Grade premiership team in the unfamiliar role of centreman.

After a clearance dispute between Richmond and West Adelaide kept him off the field in 1975, Hewitt returned to West Adelaide in 1976 and stayed for two seasons before joining Woodville in 1978. There he would kick 201 goals from 80 games with the club, including 83 in 1979 which saw him finish as the SANFL's leading goalkicker. He finished his career at South Adelaide with whom he played 86 games and kicked 78 goals before retiring in 1986.

Hewitt represented South Australia at the 1972 Perth Carnival and played five interstate football games in all, for 13 goals.
