= Lleyton Hewitt =

Australian professional tennis player (born 1981)

Lleyton Hewitt AM
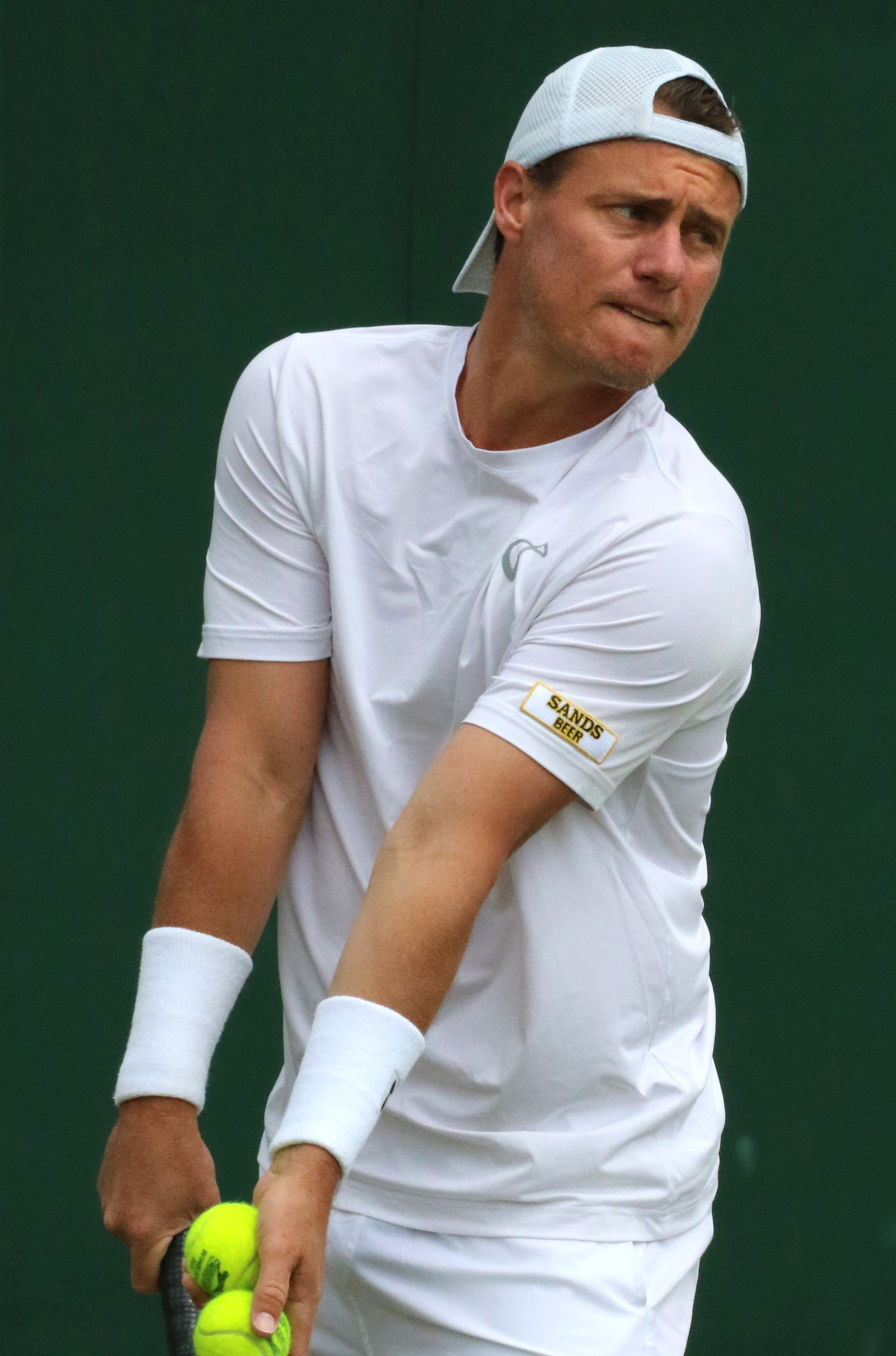
- Full name: Lleyton Glynn Hewitt
- Country (sports): Australia
- Residence: Gold Coast, Queensland, Australia
- Born: 24 February 1981 (age 45) Adelaide, South Australia
- Height: 1.78 m (5 ft 10 in)
- Turned pro: 1998
- Retired: 2016 (singles); 2020 (doubles) (two tournaments in 2025)
- Plays: Right-handed (two-handed backhand)
- Coach: Coaches list
- Prize money: US$20,890,470: 33rd all-time leader in earnings
- Int. Tennis HoF: 2021 (member page)

Singles
- Career record: 616–262 (70.2%) (Note: in ATP Tour and Grand Slam main draw matches, and in Davis Cup)
- Career titles: 30
- Highest ranking: No. 1 (19 November 2001)

Grand Slam singles results
- Australian Open: F (2005)
- French Open: QF (2001, 2004)
- Wimbledon: W (2002)
- US Open: W (2001)

Other tournaments
- Tour Finals: W (2001, 2002)
- Olympic Games: 3R (2012)

Doubles
- Career record: 134–112 (54.5%)
- Career titles: 3
- Highest ranking: No. 18 (23 October 2000)

Grand Slam doubles results
- Australian Open: QF (2018)
- French Open: 2R (1999)
- Wimbledon: 3R (1999, 2012, 2014, 2015)
- US Open: W (2000)

Other doubles tournaments
- Olympic Games: QF (2008)

Mixed doubles
- Career record: 9–5
- Career titles: 0

Grand Slam mixed doubles results
- Australian Open: 1R (1998)
- French Open: 3R (2000)
- Wimbledon: F (2000)

Other mixed doubles tournaments
- Olympic Games: QF (2012)

Team competitions
- Davis Cup: W (1999, 2003)
- Hopman Cup: F (2003)
- Spouse: Bec Cartwright (m. 2005)
- Children: 3, including Cruz
- Last updated on: 21 February 2026.

Lleyton Glynn Hewitt (born 24 February 1981) is an Australian former professional tennis player. He was ranked as the world No. 1 in men's singles by the Association of Tennis Professionals (ATP) for 80 weeks, including as the year-end No. 1 in 2001 and 2002. Hewitt won 30 singles titles and 3 doubles titles on the ATP Tour, including two singles majors at the 2001 US Open and 2002 Wimbledon Championships, a doubles major at the 2000 US Open, the 2001 and 2002 Tennis Masters Cups in singles, and led Australia to Davis Cup crowns in 1999 and 2003. On 19 November 2001, Hewitt became the youngest man to reach No. 1 in the ATP singles rankings, at the age of 20 years, 268 days (until 19 years, 130 days old Carlos Alcaraz in 2022). He was also the runner-up at the 2004 US Open and 2005 Australian Open. As of the end of 2025, he remains the most recent Australian man to win a singles major.

== Early life ==
Hewitt was born in Adelaide, South Australia. His father, Glynn, is a former Australian rules football player, and his mother, Cherilyn, was a physical education teacher. His uncle, Darryl Hewitt, and grandfather, Max Hewitt, also played football. He has a younger sister, Jaslyn, a former tennis coach and bodybuilder, and his brother-in-law (Jaslyn's husband) is Rob Shehadie, an actor and comedian. Hewitt also played Australian Football until the age of 13, when he decided to pursue a tennis career. His junior tennis club was Seaside Tennis Club in Henley Beach. He was also coached by Peter Smith at Denman Tennis Club in Mitcham.

== Tennis career ==
=== Junior years ===
As a junior Hewitt posted a 44–19 record in singles and reached as high as No. 17 in the world in 1997 (and No. 13 in doubles).

=== 1998-1999: Early pro career ===
Hewitt commenced his professional career in 1998. He became one of the youngest winners of an Association of Tennis Professionals (ATP) tournament when he won the 1998 Next Generation Adelaide International, defeating Jason Stoltenberg in the final, having defeated Andre Agassi in the semi-finals. Both Aaron Krickstein winning Tel Aviv in 1983 and Michael Chang winning San Francisco in 1988 were younger than Hewitt when they claimed their first ATP title. Hewitt then left Immanuel College to concentrate on his tennis career. He was an Australian Institute of Sport scholarship holder.

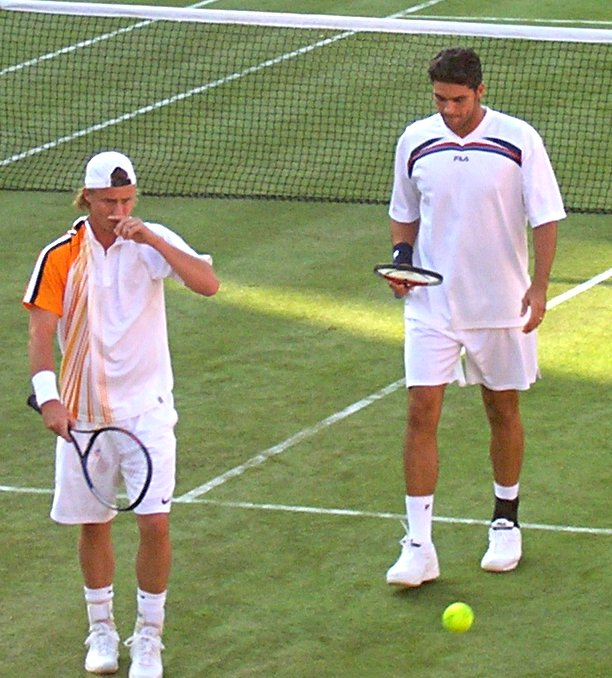
Hewitt and fellow Australian Mark Philippoussis confer during a doubles match at the 2005 Queen's Club Championships.

=== 2000: US Open doubles title, Davis Cup finals ===
In 2000, Hewitt reached his first Grand Slam final at the Wimbledon mixed doubles partnering Belgian Kim Clijsters, his then girlfriend. They lost the match, to Americans Kimberly Po and Donald Johnson. Hewitt later won his first Grand Slam title at the US Open when he along with Max Mirnyi claimed the men's doubles championship, thus becoming the youngest male (at 19 years, 6 months) to win a Grand Slam doubles crown in the open era. At the end of the year, Hewitt became the first teenager in ATP history to qualify for the year-end Tennis Masters Cup (ATP World Tour Finals).

=== 2001: US Open title, Masters Cup trophy, No. 1 ===
Hewitt started off the 2001 season well by winning the title in Sydney. He went on to win back-to-back tournaments in Queen's and Hertogenbosch. He captured his first Grand Slam singles title at the US Open, comprehensively defeating former world No. 1 Yevgeny Kafelnikov in the semi-finals, and four-time champion Pete Sampras the next day in straight sets (7-6, 6-1, 6-1). This win made Hewitt the most recent male player to win a Grand Slam singles and doubles title during his career. He went on to win the Tokyo Open, and he again qualified for the year-end Tennis Masters Cup, held in Sydney. During the tournament, Hewitt won all matches in his group; with his round-robin victory against Pat Rafter, Hewitt secured the year-end world No. 1 ranking for the first time. Hewitt went on to defeat Sébastien Grosjean in the final to take the title and cement his position as the world number one.

=== 2002: Wimbledon victory and No. 1 ===
2002 started with disappointment for Hewitt, as he lost in the first round of the Australian Open, his home Grand Slam. This was the first time the number 1 seed had lost in the opening round of the Australia Open, although Hewitt was still recovering from chickenpox. The next few months proved more successful for Hewitt and he cemented his position as the best player in the world by winning three titles: San Jose, Indian Wells and Queen's. His victory against Andre Agassi in the final of San Jose was heralded as one of the greatest matches of the season. He followed his 2001 US Open win by capturing the Wimbledon singles title. He defeated Jonas Björkman, Grégory Carraz, Julian Knowle, Mikhail Youzhny, Sjeng Schalken and dispatched home favourite Tim Henman - a rematch of their recent Queen's final - before dominating first-time finalist David Nalbandian in straight sets in the championship match; Hewitt lost only two sets (both to Schalken) throughout the championship. His victory reinforced the idea that, although the tournament had tended to be dominated by serve-and-volleyers, a baseliner could still triumph on grass (Hewitt was the first 'baseliner' to win the tournament since Agassi in 1992). Hewitt was the last man outside the so-called "Big Four" to win Wimbledon until Carlos Alcaraz in 2023.

For his third straight year, he qualified for the year-end Tennis Masters Cup, held in Shanghai, and successfully defended his title by defeating Juan Carlos Ferrero in the final. Hewitt's win helped him finish the year ranked No. 1 for a second straight year, becoming the seventh man to achieve this feat.

=== 2003: Second Masters and Davis Cup titles ===
In 2003, Hewitt defeated former No. 1 Gustavo Kuerten for the championship at Indian Wells. But at Wimbledon, as the defending champion, Hewitt lost in the first round to qualifier Ivo Karlović. Hewitt became the first defending Wimbledon men's champion in the open era to lose in the first round. Only once before in the tournament's 126-year history had a defending men's champion lost in the opening round: in 1967, when Manuel Santana was beaten by Charlie Pasarell. Hewitt was only the third defending Grand Slam champion in the open era to lose in the first round, after Boris Becker at the 1997 Australian Open and Patrick Rafter at the 1999 US Open. After Wimbledon in 2003, Hewitt lost in the final of the tournament in Los Angeles, the second round of the ATP Masters Series tournament in Montreal, and the first round of the ATP Masters Series tournament in Cincinnati. At the US Open, Hewitt lost in the quarterfinals to Juan Carlos Ferrero. Hewitt played only Davis Cup matches for the remainder of the year, recording five-set wins over Roger Federer and Juan Carlos Ferrero in the semi-finals and final respectively, as Australia went on to win the Davis Cup. Hewitt used much of his spare time in late 2003 to bulk up, gaining 7 kg.

=== 2004: US Open and Masters Cup finals ===
In 2004, Hewitt became the first man in history to lose in each Grand Slam singles tournament to the eventual champion. At the Australian Open, he was defeated in the fourth round by Roger Federer. At the French Open, he was defeated in a quarterfinal by Gastón Gaudio. At Wimbledon, he was defeated in a quarterfinal again by Federer. And, at the US Open, he was defeated in the final by Federer, losing two out of the three sets at love (6-0). At the year ending 2004 Tennis Masters Cup, Hewitt defeated Andy Roddick to advance to the final, but was yet again defeated by defending champion Federer.

=== 2005: Australian Open final ===
In 2005, Hewitt won his only title at the Sydney Medibank International defeating little-known Czech player Ivo Minář. Hewitt spent much time in the late stages of 2004 working with his former coach and good friend, Roger Rasheed, on bulking up his physique. His hard work paid off during the Australian summer, when he defeated an in-form No. 2 Andy Roddick to reach his first Australian Open final in 2005. He was the first Australian player to reach the final since Pat Cash in 1988. In the final, he faced fourth seed, Marat Safin, who had defeated No. 1 and defending champion Roger Federer in the semi-finals. After easily taking the first set, he was defeated by the Russian despite being up a break in the third set.

At Wimbledon, Hewitt reached the semi-finals, but lost to eventual champion Federer. Two months later, Hewitt again lost to Federer in the US Open semi-final, although this time he was able to take one set from the Swiss. Hewitt had at this point lost to the eventual champion at seven consecutive Grand Slam tournaments he played, (he missed the 2005 French Open because of injury). Hewitt pulled out of the Tennis Masters Cup tournament in Shanghai in November 2005 so that he could be with his wife Bec, who was due to give birth.

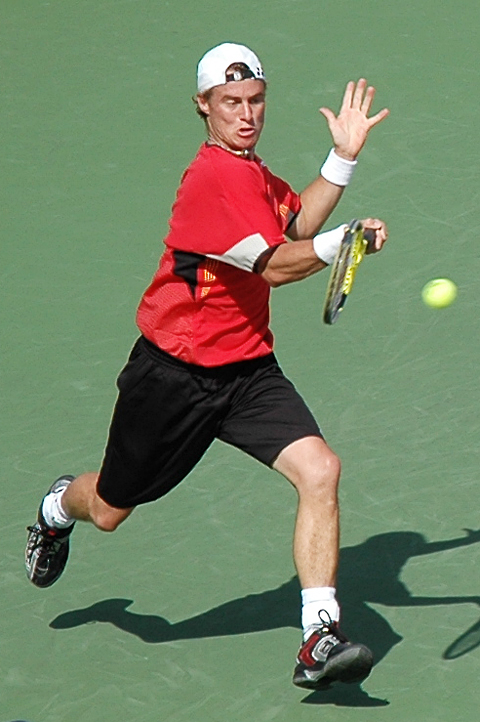
Hewitt at the 2006 US Open

=== 2006: 25th career title ===
Hewitt was defeated in the second round of the 2006 Australian Open by Juan Ignacio Chela of Argentina. He then reached the finals of the San Jose and Las Vegas tournaments, losing to British youngster Andy Murray and American James Blake, respectively. But he lost to Tim Henman in the second round of the Miami Masters, a player he had defeated eight times previously in as many matches. At the 2006 French Open, Hewitt reached the fourth round, where he lost to defending champion and eventual winner Rafael Nadal in four sets.

Hewitt won his first tournament of 2006 (after a 17-month hiatus from winning a tournament), when he beat Blake in the final of the Queen's Club Championships. This was his fourth title there, equalling the records of John McEnroe and Boris Becker. During the 2006 Wimbledon Championships, Hewitt survived a five-set match against South Korea's Hyung-Taik Lee that was played over two days. He then defeated Olivier Rochus and David Ferrer, before losing to Marcos Baghdatis in the quarterfinals. At the 2006 Legg Mason Tennis Classic in Washington, D.C., Hewitt was defeated by Arnaud Clément in the quarterfinals, after defeating Vincent Spadea in the second round and Denis Gremelmayr in the third round.

Hewitt participated at the 2006 US Open, despite having an injured knee. Hewitt won his first three matches in straight sets against, respectively, Albert Montañés, Jan Hernych, and Novak Djokovic. He defeated Richard Gasquet in five sets to advance to the quarterfinals for the seventh consecutive year. He then lost to Roddick.

=== 2007: 26th career title ===
At the 2007 Australian Open, Hewitt lost in the third round to tenth-seeded Chilean and eventual runner-up Fernando González. With his win in Las Vegas in March, Hewitt had won at least one ATP title annually for ten consecutive years. This was a record among active players at the time. Hewitt reached the 2007 Hamburg Masters semi-finals, where he pushed eventual finalist Rafael Nadal to three sets. At the 2007 French Open, Hewitt, for the second straight time lost in the fourth round to Nadal. At the 2007 Wimbledon Championships, Hewitt won his first three matches, including a four-set third round victory over Guillermo Cañas. He then faced fourth seed Novak Djokovic in the fourth round, which he lost.

After Wimbledon, it was announced that he had hired former Australian tennis pro Tony Roche to coach him during Grand Slam and Masters tournaments in 2007 and 2008. At the Masters tournaments in Montréal and Cincinnati Hewitt reached the quarterfinals and semi-finals, respectively. In both cases, he lost to Roger Federer.

He was seeded 16th at the 2007 US Open, but for the first time in eight consecutive appearances at Flushing Meadows, he did not reach the quarterfinals or further. He lost in the second round to Argentine Agustín Calleri.

=== 2008: Injuries and year without titles ===
At the 2008 Australian Open, he advanced to the fourth round as the 19th seed, defeating 15th-seeded and 2006 Australian Open finalist Marcos Baghdatis in a thrilling third-round match. The 282-minute match started at 11:52 pm and ended at 4:34 am the following morning. It was a characteristically "gutsy" performance and cemented Hewitt's reputation as a tough competitor. Hewitt lost his fourth-round match in straight sets to third-seeded and eventual champion Novak Djokovic.

A hip injury Hewitt acquired in March 2008 affected his preparation for the French Open and forced the loss of 300 rankings points as Hewitt was unable to defend his semi-final appearance at the Hamburg Masters, as well as compete in supplementary tournaments. However, Hewitt made the third round at Roland Garros, before losing a five-set thriller to fifth seed David Ferrer.

Despite his ongoing hip problem, Hewitt was able to compete at the Queens Club Championship with moderate success, falling to second seed Novak Djokovic in the quarterfinals. His good form continued into Wimbledon, Hewitt making the fourth round for the second successive year, before losing to No. 1 and top seed Roger Federer.

After Wimbledon, Hewitt elected to miss the Montreal and Cincinnati Masters in an effort to give his hip sufficient rest to enable him to play at the 2008 Beijing Olympics, where he defeated Jonas Björkman in the first round before losing to second seed Rafael Nadal. However, the more notable incident in the Olympics occurred in Hewitt's opening-round doubles match with Chris Guccione against Argentines Juan Mónaco and Agustín Calleri. The match went to an advantage third set with Hewitt and Guccione prevailing 18–16. After the Olympics, due to the further damage Hewitt's hip sustained at the Olympics, he was left with no option but to pull out of the US Open and skip the rest of the season to have hip surgery. 2008 was the first year since 1997 in which Hewitt did not win a title.

=== 2009: Clay title, Wimbledon quarters, top 20 ===
After returning from hip surgery, Hewitt played his first match in 2009 at the Hopman Cup, where he defeated Nicolas Kiefer in three sets. At Medibank International Sydney, Hewitt lost in the quarterfinals to David Nalbandian. Hewitt then played in the 2009 Australian Open, where he was unseeded in a Grand Slam for the first time since 2000. He faced Fernando González in the first round and lost in five sets.

At Memphis, he caused an upset in the first round by defeating James Blake in three sets. He lost to Andy Roddick in the semi-finals in a close match. Hewitt then lost in the first round of Delray Beach to Yen-Hsun Lu. In Indian Wells, California, he reached the second round, losing to Fernando González. In Miami, Hewitt lost to seventh seed Gilles Simon in straight sets.

At the 2009 U.S. Men's Clay Court Championships, Hewitt defeated seventh seed Diego Junqueira, Sergio Roitman in just 57 minutes, Guillermo García López, Evgeny Korolev and Wayne Odesnik in the final, for his first title since 2007 and his first clay-court title in a decade. Hewitt entered the Monte Carlo Masters as a wild card. He lost in the first round to Marat Safin.

At the 2009 BMW Open, Hewitt recorded his 500th career win after defeating Philipp Petzschner in the first round, becoming one of only four active players to achieve this milestone; the others being Roger Federer and Carlos Moyá. Andy Roddick would later achieve this feat. In the 2009 French Open, he defeated 26th seed Ivo Karlović in five sets in the first round, and Andrey Golubev in the second. He lost to No. 1 Rafael Nadal in the third round. At the 2009 Aegon Championships in London he lost to former rival Andy Roddick in the third round, and the match did not disappoint.

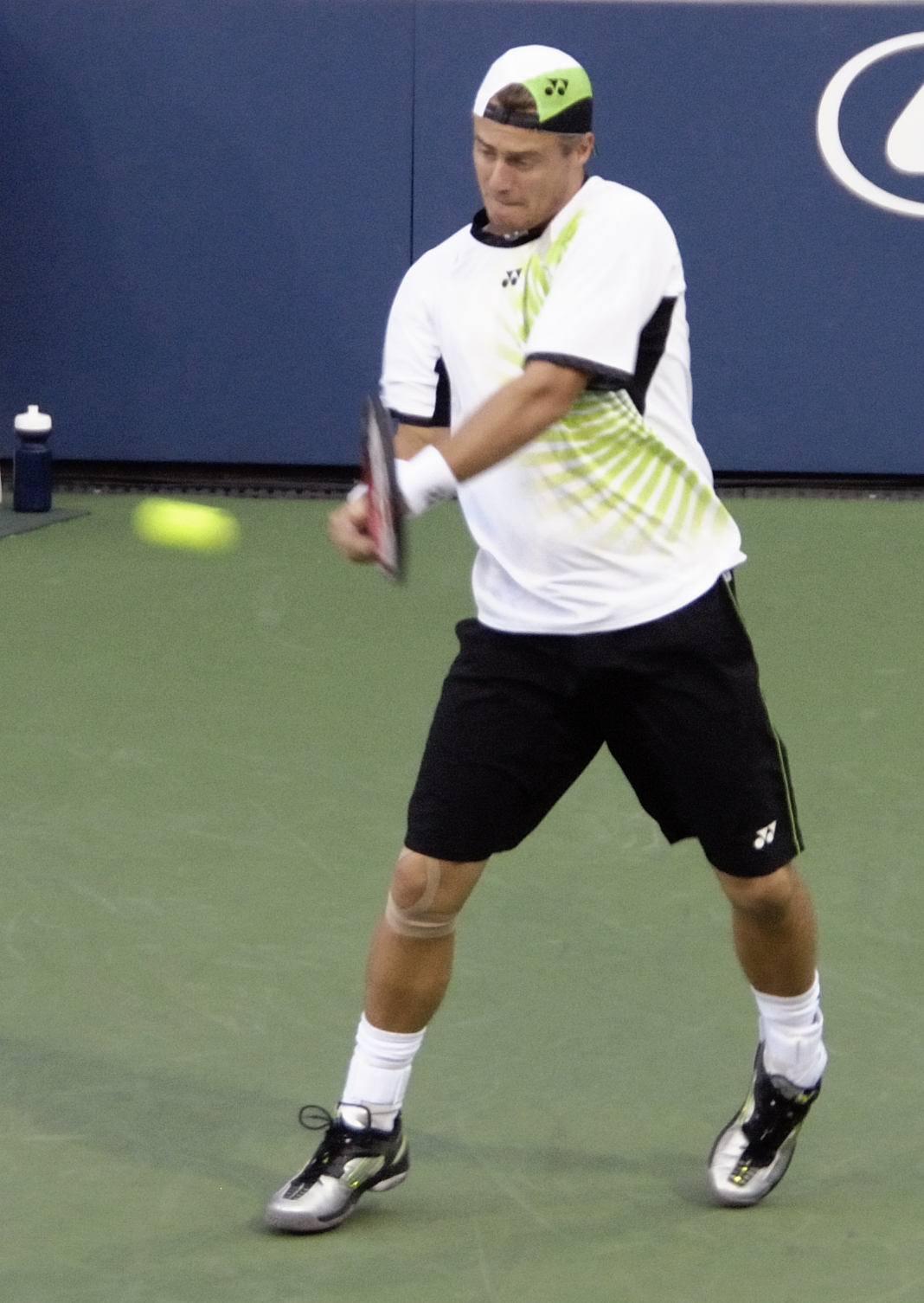
Hewitt at the 2009 US Open

In the 2009 Wimbledon Championships, Hewitt beat del Potro in straight sets. He reversed a two-set deficit to defeat Radek Štěpánek in the fourth round. His run ended in the quarterfinals against sixth seed Andy Roddick. It was a five-set thriller which featured two tiebreaks. Hewitt lost a heartbreaking match. It was the first time Hewitt had reached the quarterfinals of a Major since the 2006 U.S. Open.

At the Legg Mason Classic in Washington, Hewitt lost in three sets in the third round to Juan Martín del Potro. At the Montreal Masters, Hewitt lost in the first round to former No. 1 Juan Carlos Ferrero. Cincinnati saw Hewitt reach the quarterfinals for the sixth time, where he lost to Roger Federer in straight sets. During the first round of the tournament, Hewitt showed his trademark fighting abilities by saving two match points to win against an in-form Robin Söderling. At the U.S. Open, Hewitt progressed to the third round, where he played Federer for the 23rd time of their decade-long rivalry. Hewitt managed to take the first set 6–4 from Federer, before the 15-time Grand Slam champion took control of the second. The third set was tight, and both players saved multiple break points. Federer won the match in four sets.

In September, Hewitt lost in round one of the Malaysian Open in Kuala Lumpur to Joachim Johansson. In Tokyo, Hewitt lost in the semi finals to Mikhail Youzhny. He then competed in the 2009 Shanghai ATP Masters 1000, where he lost to Gaël Monfils in round two.

=== 2010: Halle title and victory over Federer ===
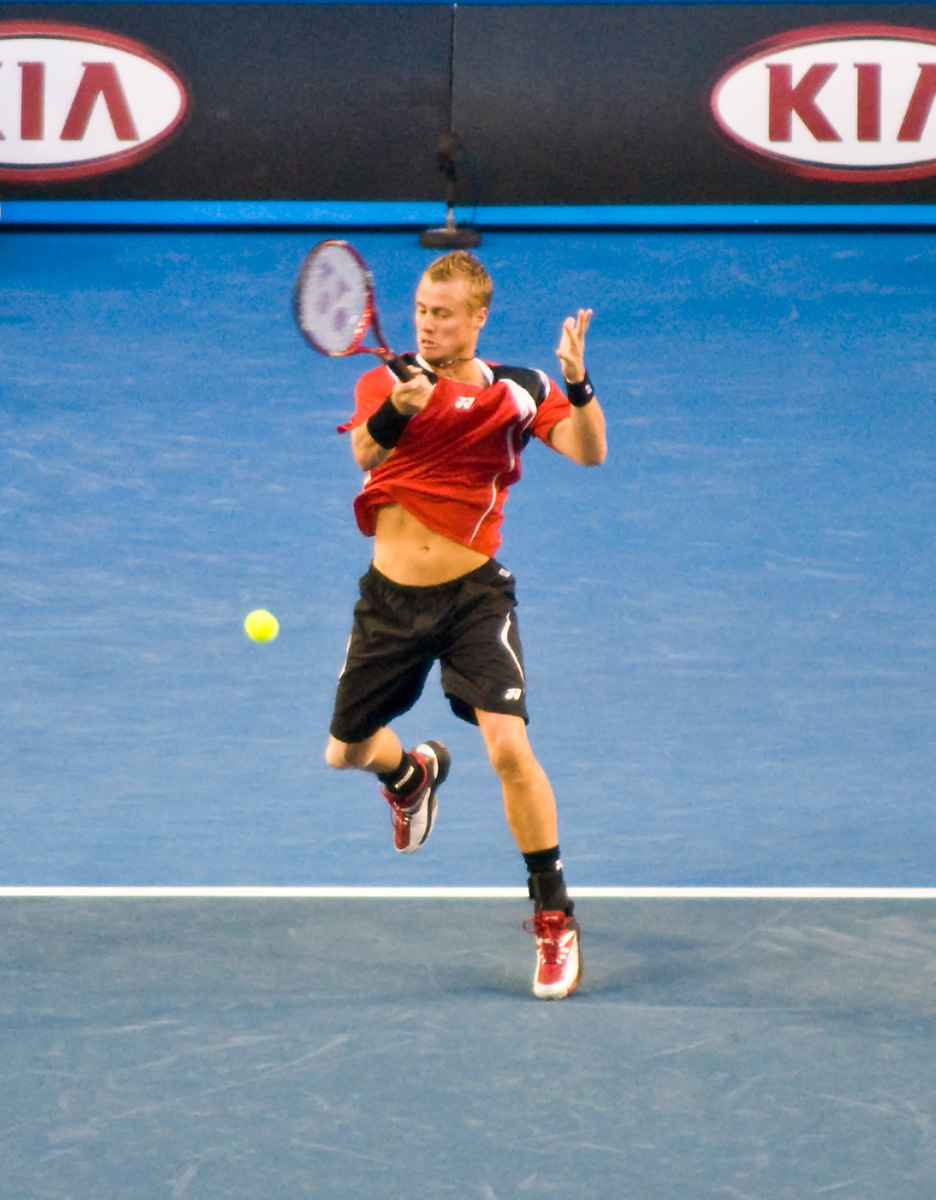
Lleyton Hewitt at the 2010 Australian Open

Hewitt lost in the quarter finals of Medibank International to Marcos Baghdatis. At the 2010 Australian Open, he lost to Roger Federer in the fourth round.

A week after his exit from the Australian Open, Hewitt underwent another hip operation similar to his left hip operation this time on his right hip on 28 January 2010 in Hobart. Hewitt returned to the tour at the U.S. Men's Clay Court Championships as the singles defending champion. With coach Nathan Healey in the doubles they lost to top seeds the Bryan brothers in the semi-finals. In singles, Hewitt lost to Juan Ignacio Chela in round two. Hewitt then reached the second round in Barcelona, before losing to Eduardo Schwank, and lost in the second round of the Internazionali BNL d'Italia to Guillermo García López. Hewitt then travelled back to Australia to participate in a Davis Cup tie against Japan, winning his two singles matches.

At the French Open, Hewitt reached the third round, before losing to Rafael Nadal.

On 13 June, Hewitt defeated Roger Federer in the final of the Gerry Weber Open in Halle, Germany, a grass-court tuneup for Wimbledon Championships. The win was Hewitt's first over Federer since 2003, snapping a 15-match losing streak.

At Wimbledon, Hewitt was seeded 15th and lost to third seed, Novak Djokovic in the fourth round. After dropping the first two sets, Hewitt took advantage of a stomach illness had by Djokovic to take the third set. However, Hewitt could not mount a comeback, and lost in four sets.

At the Atlanta Tennis Championship, Hewitt lost in the first round to Lukáš Lacko. At the Legg Mason Classic, Hewitt retired in the second round due to a leg injury. He returned in Cincinnati.

Hewitt was 32nd seed at the US Open and lost his first-round match to Paul-Henri Mathieu in five sets. It was his earliest exit at the US Open.

He withdrew from the Malaysian Open due to a wrist injury suffered during the Australian Davis Cup playoff loss to Belgium.

=== 2011: Surgery and out of Top 100 ===
At the 2011 Australian Open, Hewitt was defeated in the first round in five sets by Argentina's David Nalbandian. Hewitt was up two sets to one and during the fourth set had the chance to finish off the match, when the scores were 3–1 and 0–40 in Hewitt's favour, but failed to capitalise on the situation. Furthermore, Hewitt had two match point opportunities in the final set to close out victory.

After the Australian Open, Hewitt participated in the SAP Open, and lost in the quarterfinals to former US Open champion Juan Martín del Potro, who was on a comeback from a wrist injury.

The next tournament that Hewitt took part in was the Regions Morgan Keegan Championships and the Cellular South Cup in Memphis, Tennessee, where Hewitt lost to top seed Andy Roddick despite being a set up.

At 2011 BNP Paribas Open, he lost in round one to Lu Yen-hsun. This was to be Hewitt's last event on the ATP Tour for over three months after he underwent surgery on his left foot. He made his comeback at the 2011 Gerry Weber Open in Halle, Germany, where he returned as defending champion. Hewitt's reign as champion of Halle came to an end at the hands of home favourite Philipp Kohlschreiber, when the Australian went down in straight sets. During this match, Hewitt turned his ankle when he came in to the net to try to reach a net cord ball. The following week, Hewitt had to retire during a first round match at the Aegon International against Olivier Rochus. This was a result of the niggling ankle injury he had picked up at Halle the week before.

Hewitt came into Wimbledon with doubts over his fitness and condition and was unseeded in the 2011 Wimbledon Championships draw. Hewitt faced Kei Nishikori in the first round and won in four sets. In the second round, Hewitt lost to fifth seed Robin Söderling in five sets.

At the 2011 Atlanta Tennis Championships, Hewitt beat Phillip Simmonds in straight sets. He lost his second round encounter against the American qualifier Rajeev Ram. After this defeat, Hewitt who had been scheduled to play in Los Angeles the following week, opted not to take up the offer of a wildcard and withdrew from the event to recover from his foot injury. He then was offered a wild card to play at the 2011 US Open, but was unable to play due to foot injury which ended his season.

=== 2012: First ATP final in two years ===
At the Apia International, Hewitt lost in the first round against Viktor Troicki.

At the 2012 Australian Open, partnering countryman Peter Luczak, the Aussies lost in straight sets to the Bryan Twins in round two. In singles, where he was awarded a wildcard, Hewitt faced Roddick in the second round. After dropping the first set, Hewitt won the next two. Roddick then retired due to a groin injury and Hewitt advanced. In the third round, he beat the 23rd seed Milos Raonic of Canada at night in front of a boisterous Aussie crowd. In the fourth round, Hewitt faced returning champ and No. 1-ranked Novak Djokovic. Djokovic won the 1st two sets fairly easily, and was leading 3–0 in the 3rd set when Hewitt launched a spirited comeback, taking the set 6–4. Djokovic eventually prevailed however, winning the match in four sets. Hewitt's two next matches were in February at the Davis Cup, where he won one singles and one doubles match partnering Chris Guccione, what awarded Australia to go to the playoffs once more. After this Hewitt needed an operation to have a plate inserted in his toe.

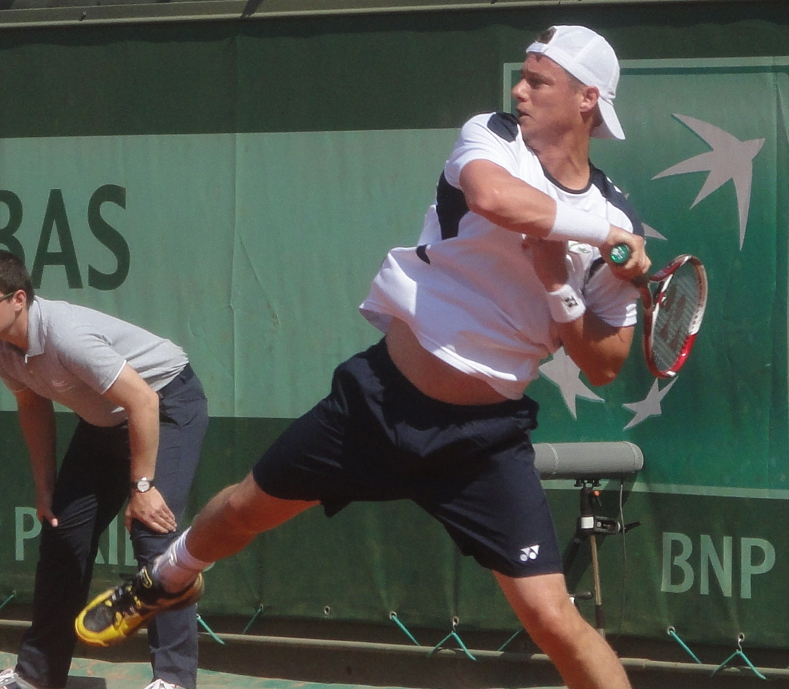
Lleyton Hewitt at the French Open in 2012

Hewitt returned with a wildcard at the French Open where he lost in the first round to Blaž Kavčič. After this, Hewitt began his grass season at Queen's Club Championships. He lost in the 1st round to Croatian Ivo Karlović. At Wimbledon, he was defeated in the first round by 5th seed Jo-Wilfried Tsonga. I doubles at Wimbledon partnering countryman Chris Guccione, they made the third round before losing in 4 sets.

After Wimbledon, Hewitt was granted a wild card at Newport. He lost to top seeded John Isner in the final.

Playing in the Olympics after being awarded a wild card, Hewitt beat Sergiy Stakhovsky and Marin Čilić, seeded 13th, to advance to the third round. There, he met 2nd seed Novak Djokovic. After losing the first set, Djokovic overpowered Hewitt to take the final two sets and eliminate Hewitt from the tournament. In the mixed doubles, he and Sam Stosur reached the quarterfinals, where they lost two sets to one to Britain's Andy Murray and Laura Robson.

Hewitt received a WC to the Cincinnati Masters, where he lost to Viktor Troicki in the second round. The Aussie's next tournament was the US Open, where he received a WC, completing the "Wild Card Slam" (received wild cards in all of the four Grand Slams in 2012). Hewitt lost to 4th seed and No. 5-ranked David Ferrer in the third round, despite having set points in the 1st set.

=== 2013: Five top ten wins ===
Hewitt started off 2013 in Brisbane, where he lost in second round against Denis Istomin in straight sets. At exhibition event AAMI Kooyong Classic, he defeated Milos Raonic, Tomáš Berdych, and Juan Martín del Potro en route to claim his second title. At the 2013 Australian Open, he suffered his sixth first-round exit in his home slam to No. 9 Janko Tipsarević in straight sets. Hewitt then played in the Davis Cup against Taiwan and won in both singles and doubles.

At SAP Open in San Jose, he lost his second-round match to Sam Querrey in a three-set thriller. He also claimed a wild card to play in doubles with fellow Aussie Marinko Matosevic, beating the No. 1 American duo Mike Bryan and Bob Bryan in the quarterfinals, before losing to Xavier Malisse and Frank Moser in the final. With Hewitt's doubles run in the tournament, he surpassed the 100-wins mark in doubles. He next participated in the U.S. National Indoor Tennis Championships in Memphis. He faced Yen-Hsun Lu in the opening round, saving two match points to edge Lu in three sets. He lost to Denis Istomin, again in the second round.

At BNP Paribas Open in Indian Wells, he lost his third round match to Stanislas Wawrinka. Hewitt lost to Gilles Simon in the opening round at Roland Garros. After winning the first two sets, he succumbed in five. In his first match at the Aegon Championships Queen's Club, he beat Juan Martín del Potro (in three sets), to progress to the semi-finals, where he lost to Marin Čilić in three sets. At Wimbledon, Hewitt beat top ten player Stanislas Wawrinka in the first round in straight sets. He was then defeated by German qualifier Dustin Brown in the second round in four sets.

In July he made it to his first final of the year at the Hall-of-Fame Championships, losing to Nicolas Mahut having served for the championship at 5–4 in the second set. His form continued at the Atlanta Open, where he lost to John Isner in the semi-finals in three tough sets. His US Open run started well, beating Brian Baker in four sets and following up with a five-set epic upset against fellow former US Open champion Juan Martín del Potro, where Hewitt came back from two sets to one down against the No. 6, winning a fourth set tiebreak and sealing the match 6–1 in the fifth. He beat Evgeny Donskoy in the third round to set up a fourth round match with Mikhail Youzhny. Hewitt then lost to Youzhny in five sets, despite leading 4–1 in the fourth set and serving for the match at 5–3 in the fifth set. A measure of the success of Hewitt's 2013 season is the fact that he won the Newcombe medal as the most outstanding Australian tennis player in 2013, a year in which he returned to the world's top 100.

=== 2014: 30th career title, 600 wins, top 40 ===
In the semi-finals of 2014 Brisbane International Hewitt beat second seed Kei Nishikori. Going into the final, Roger Federer held an 18–8 record head–to–head against Hewitt. Hewitt managed to turn the tide on Federer, winning in three sets and capturing the title, which was his 29th and first since 2010. As a result, his ranking increased from 60th to 43rd, becoming Australian number one again. At AAMI Classic, he defeated Andy Murray in two tiebreaks.

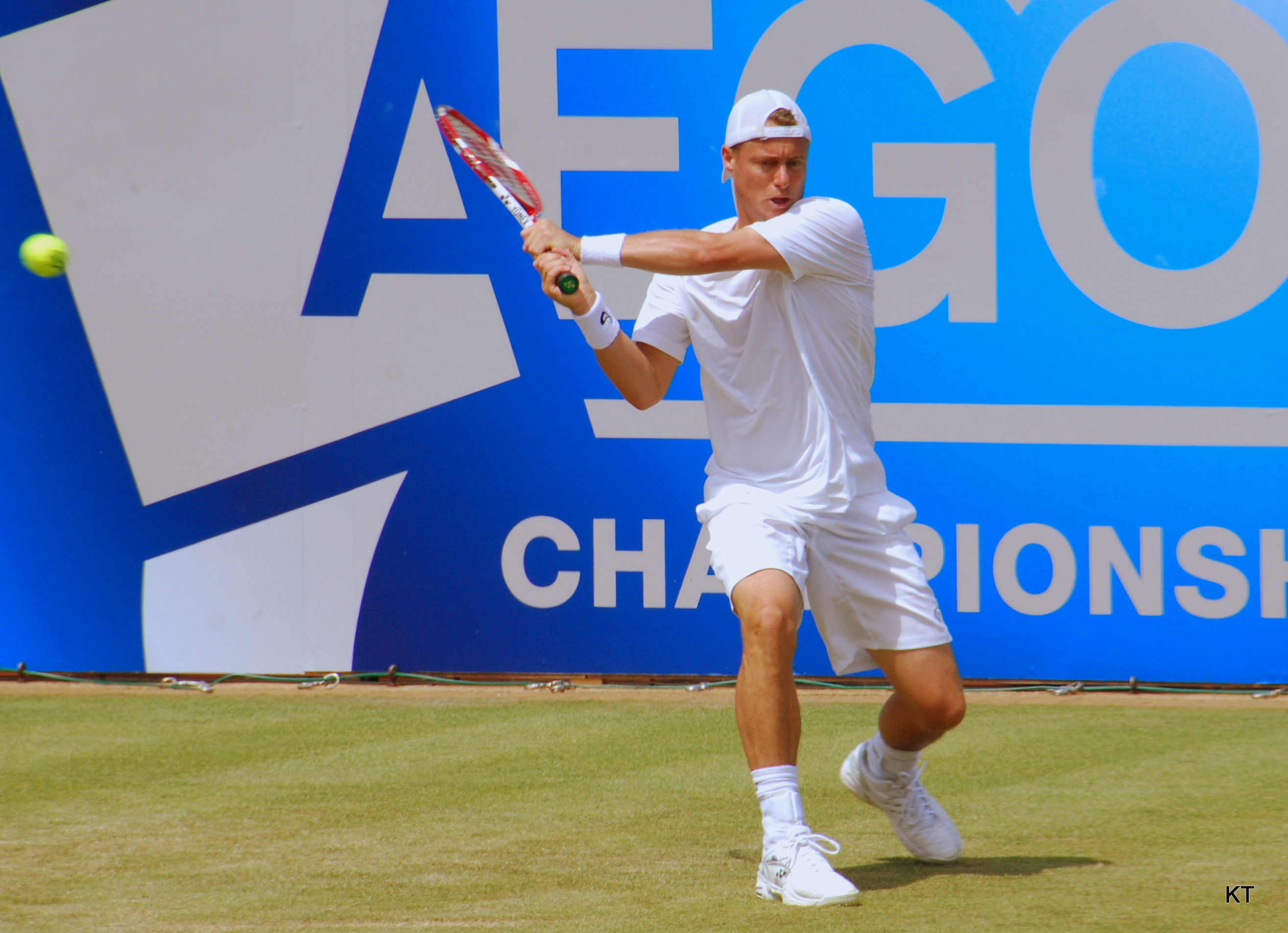
Lleyton Hewitt at the Queen's Club in 2014

In the 2014 Australian Open, Hewitt played both singles and doubles as an unseeded player. In his first round singles match, he lost in five sets to No. 24 seed Andreas Seppi. In doubles action, Hewitt partnered with retired and former Australian number one Patrick Rafter. They lost their first round match against Eric Butorac and Raven Klaasen. After the tournament, Hewitt's singles rank rose to No. 38, his highest position since late 2010. Hewitt battled for his 600th ATP win, becoming only the third active player to reach that milestone by beating Robin Haase in the 1st round of the 2014 Sony Open Tennis.

After the Australian Open, Hewitt played as part of the Australian representative team for the Davis Cup. He lost his match against Jo-Wilfried Tsonga in straight sets. He then competed in the 2014 U.S. National Indoor Tennis Championships in Memphis beating Marcos Baghdatis in three sets before losing to Michael Russell in two sets. At the Delray Beach Tournament he won a round and then retired against Marinko Matosevic after injuring his shoulder.

Hewitt played at the BNP Paribas Open where he lost in round two to Kevin Anderson. Hewitt then played at the Sony Open Tennis where he lost in round two to No. 1 Rafael Nadal. Hewitt then played at the U.S. Men's Clay Court Championships where he lost in Round of 16 to Sam Querrey.

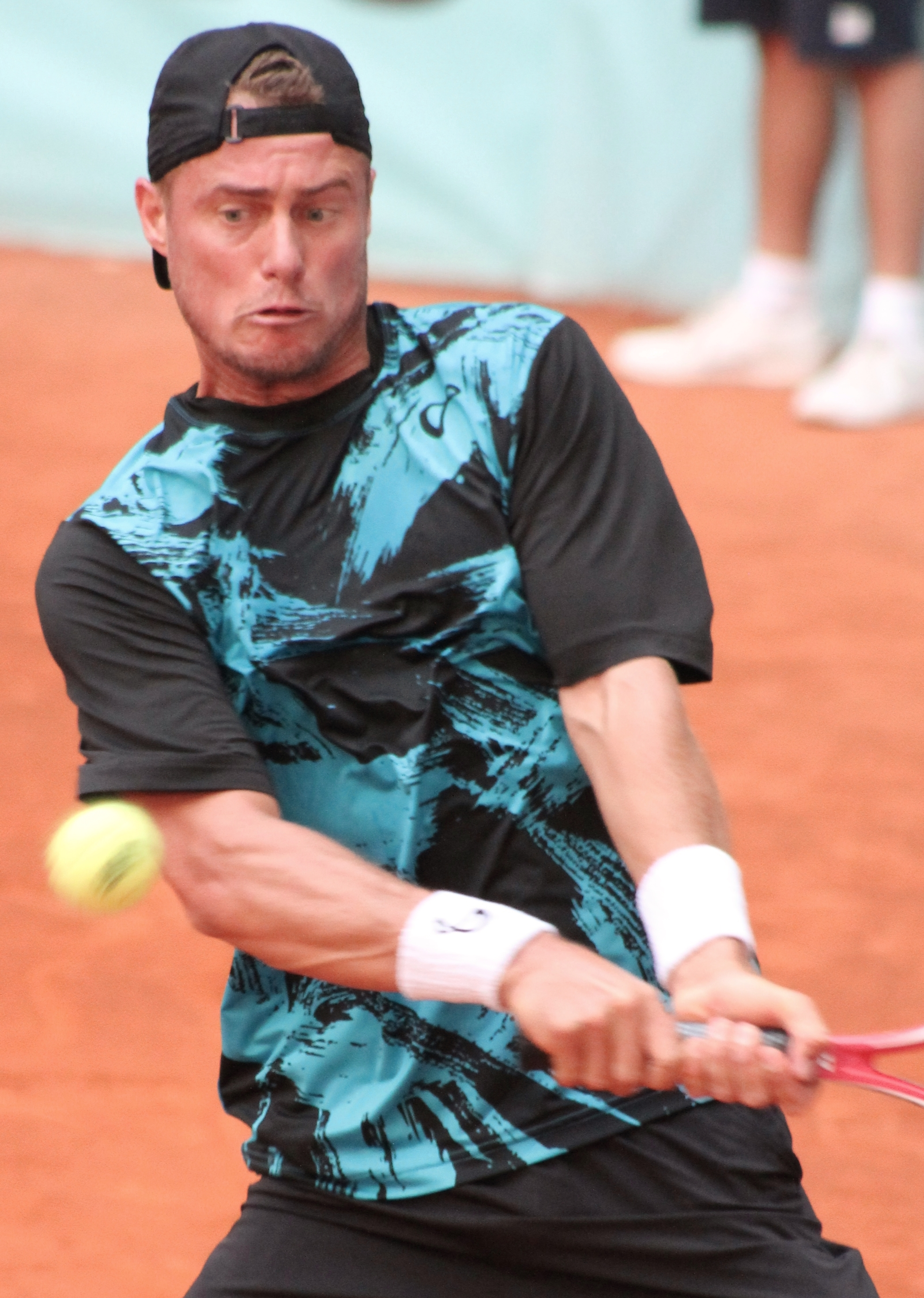
Hewitt in Madrid in 2014

Hewitt suffered three consecutive first round losses at the BMW Open by FWU AG to Albert Ramos Viñolas, Mutua Madrid Open to Santiago Giraldo and at the French Open Roland Garros to Carlos Berlocq in four sets. This ended Hewitt's clay court season.

At the Aegon Championships, Hewitt lost in the second round to Feliciano López in straight sets. Hewitt played at Wimbledon where he lost in the second round in five sets to Jerzy Janowicz.

At the Newport Hall of Fame Tennis Championships Hewitt advanced to the final for the third consecutive year where he beat Ivo Karlović in three sets. It was his 30th career singles title. Hewitt went on to win the doubles title with countryman Chris Guccione later that same day.

Hewitt defeated Austria's Jürgen Melzer in three sets at the Cincinnati Masters to reach 610 wins on the ATP Tour. That enabled him to rise to number 19 on the all-time wins list, topping Björn Borg and Yevgeny Kafelnikov in the process.

=== 2015: Farewell year ===
Hewitt began his 2015 season as the defending champion of the Brisbane International. In the first round he lost in straight sets to Sam Groth. As a result, he dropped from rank No. 50 to No. 84 and lost his position of No. 1 Australian. Hewitt played the first Fast4 short-form tennis exhibition match against Roger Federer but lost in five sets.

Hewitt then made his 19th consecutive Australian Open appearance, which is the fourth longest streak at any Grand Slam. He lost in five sets to his second round opponent Benjamin Becker despite winning the first two sets.

At a media conference, Hewitt mentioned plans to retire after the 2016 Australian Open to become the captain of the Australian Davis Cup team after Pat Rafter moved on from the position, becoming the seventh man to captain the team. "I had thought long and hard and I plan to play the Australian Open next year and then finish", he said. "At the moment, [the Davis Cup] is the main focus for us and then I will be looking towards the grass court season and finishing here in Melbourne, which would be special to play 20 Australian Opens". It will be Australia's first time in the world group of the Davis Cup in six years. Rafter and John Newcombe are the only other two Australian men to have been ranked No. 1 since ranks were established in 1973.

Hewitt then played the Miami Open and lost in the first round to Thomaz Bellucci in three sets. He was then awarded a wildcard to the 2015 U.S. Men's Clay Court Championships where he also lost in the first round to Go Soeda.

Hewitt skipped the remainder of the clay court season including the 2015 French Open, instead opting to focus on the grass season and Wimbledon. He began his grass court season at the 2015 Topshelf Open where he lost to Nicolas Mahut in the first round. He also was awarded a wildcard into the men's doubles where he partnered compatriot Matt Reid.

At Wimbledon, Hewitt was awarded a wildcard and was defeated by Jarkko Nieminen 11-9 in the fifth set in the first round of his eighteenth and final appearance at the tournament. It became his 44th five-set match of his Grand Slam career. Despite three straight breaks in the fifth set, Hewitt on serve faced and saved three match points at 4–5, and held serve each time until the 20th game of the fifth set. Afterwards both the crowd and Nieminen himself gave Hewitt a standing ovation. Partnering compatriot Thanasi Kokkinakis, the wild card duo reached the third round of the Wimbledon men's doubles. Hewitt played in the mixed doubles with compatriot Casey Dellacqua on a wild card and lost in the second round, seemingly ending his Wimbledon career.

Hewitt partnered Sam Groth to win Australia's Davis Cup quarterfinals doubles rubber against Kazakhstan in Darwin on 18 July. With their spectacular performance, Groth and Hewitt were selected to play the last two reverse-singles rubbers, replacing Kyrgios and Kokkinakis respectively. After Groth's win, Hewitt won the deciding fifth rubber against Nedovyesov to put Australia at 3–2 to reach the semi-finals. It was Australia's first win from 0–2 down since 1939.

Hewitt, on a wild card, lost in the second round of the US Open to Tomic in five sets despite having two match points. Hewitt, partnered with Sam Groth, lost a tough Davis Cup semi-final doubles tie against the British Murray brothers in 5 sets. Todd Woodbridge hailed it as the "Best [doubles] I've watched for years."

=== 2016: Retirement ===
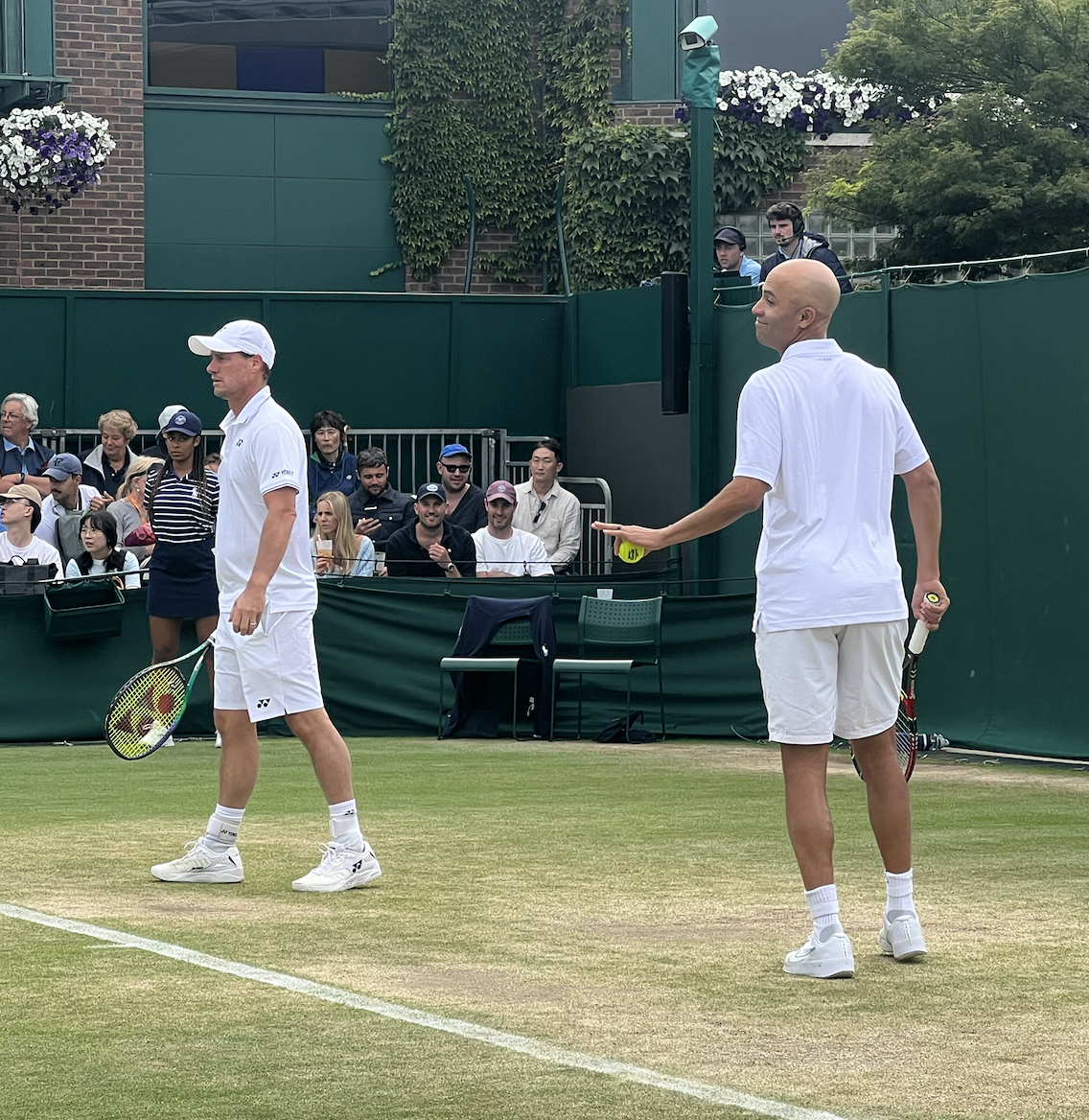
Hewitt playing alongside James Blake in the 2023 Wimbledon Invitational Doubles tournament as a retired player.

Having previously announced his intentions to retire after the 2016 Australian Open, Hewitt confirmed that his final season would consist of that, the Hopman Cup and the exhibition World Tennis Challenge.

In his 20th appearance at the Australian Open, he won his first round match against fellow Australian James Duckworth in straight sets. He then lost in the second round in 3 straight competitive sets to 8th seed David Ferrer, 2–6, 4–6, 4–6. Post-match he was remembered by players including Roger Federer, Rafael Nadal, Andy Murray and Nick Kyrgios as a man who was at the top of the game for years, and continually displayed the fighting spirit that he became synonymous with.

He was made a Member of the Order of Australia in the awards announced on Australia Day.

In March Hewitt came out of retirement to replace the injured Nick Kyrgios in the first round Davis Cup against the US at the Kooyong Lawn Tennis Club. He played doubles with John Peers against the Bryan brothers. The Australian duo came back from two sets to love but lost the fifth set.

Hewitt was the subject of a book titled "Facing Hewitt" which features fifty interviews with professional tennis players who competed against him.

In June it was announced that Hewitt would be taking a wildcard into the Wimbledon doubles competition, playing alongside young compatriot Jordan Thompson. In the first round, the pair saved eight match points to defeat Nicolás Almagro and David Marrero 19–17 in the deciding set. However, they lost to the eighth seeds in the second round.

=== 2018: Comeback in doubles ===
In December 2017, it was announced that Hewitt would come out of retirement and accept a doubles wildcard with compatriot Sam Groth at the 2018 Australian Open.

Hewitt and Jordan Thompson accepted a wildcard to play Doubles at the 2018 Brisbane International. They lost in the first round to Grigor Dimitrov and Ryan Harrison.

Hewitt then played in the fast4 exhibition in Sydney where he lost to Grigor Dimitrov. Hewitt and Kyrgios won the doubles beating Alexander Zverev and Grigor Dimitrov. After that, he played the Tie Break Tens in Melbourne where he won his opening match against Novak Djokovic, before losing to world No. 1 Rafael Nadal.

In the Australian Open doubles, Hewitt and Groth made a run to the quarterfinals, including a win over third seeds Jean-Julien Rojer and Horia Tecău. This was his best doubles result at the Australian Open in his career.

Hewitt's doubles comeback continued with Lleyton playing doubles at the 2018 Estoril Open with Alex de Minaur where they defeated second seeds Michael Venus and Raven Klaasen before losing in the quarterfinals. He then reached the semi-finals of the 2018 Fuzion 100 Surbiton Trophy – Men's doubles with Alex Bolt before Venus and Klaasen gained revenge on Hewitt (this time with Alex Bolt) at the 2018 Rosmalen Grass Court Championships – Men's doubles.

Hewitt then teamed up with Nick Kyrgios at the 2018 Queen's Club Championships – Doubles tournament where they defeated number 3 seeds Nicolas Mahut and Pierre-Hugues Herbert before losing in the quarterfinals. At the 2018 Wimbledon Championships – Men's doubles, Hewitt was again wildcard with Alex Bolt however the pair again lost in the first round to Venus and Klaasen. After this loss, Hewitt teamed up with Jordan Thompson and lost in the first round of the 2018 Hall of Fame Tennis Championships in Newport.

Hewitt's last professional match of 2018 was in the 2018 Davis Cup World Group play-offs against Austria where Hewitt paired up with experienced doubles specialist John Peers to defeat the Austrian team of doubles specialist Oliver Marach and experienced clay-courier Juergen Melzer.

=== 2019: Continuing to play doubles ===
In 2019, Hewitt played doubles at a number of tournaments. In a pairing with Jordan Thompson, they lost in the first round of the Sydney International. A week later he teamed up with John-Patrick Smith at the Australian Open, yet again losing in the first round. Hewitt and countryman Jordan Thompson received a wildcard to play at the Wimbledon Championships. They reached the second round before losing to R. Klaasen and M. Venus in straight sets.

Also that year, he played doubles in New York, Houston, Surbiton, and 's-Hertogenbosch, playing with the likes of Alexei Popyrin and Thompson yet again.

=== 2020: Back in hometown of Adelaide ===
Hewitt once again featured in the Australian summer of tennis, this time choosing to participate in the new Adelaide International, the first time he had played tour-tennis in his home town for over a decade. He partnered Jordan Thompson but lost in the first round to Cristian Garín and Juan Ignacio Londero. The two chose to compete at the Australian Open a week later, but lost in the first round in straight sets, to Korean duo Min-Kyu Song and Nam Ji-sung.

Hewitt continues to commentate matches at the Australian Open.

=== 2025: Return to doubles ===
In November 2025, Hewitt came out of retirement to partner his son Cruz in the NSW Open doubles draw with a wildcard. In that tournament, they reached the quarterfinals, where they were defeated in straight sets by fellow Australians Calum Puttergill and Dane Sweeny.

Hewitt and his son also entered the Playford Tennis International, but conceded a walkover after Cruz suffered an adductor injury in singles play.

== National representation ==
=== Davis Cup ===
Hewitt made his Davis Cup debut for Australia in the 1999 Davis Cup quarterfinals at age 18 against the United States in Chestnut Hill, Massachusetts. In the first rubber of the tie Hewitt faced No. 8 and Wimbledon quarter finalist Todd Martin. Hewitt caused a major upset over Martin and would go on to win his second singles rubber against Alex O'Brien as well. The great start to his Davis Cup career would continue in the 1999 semi-finals against Russia where he would record another two wins against Marat Safin and Yevgeny Kafelnikov. He would taste his first defeat in Davis Cup in the 1999 final against France but would become a Davis Cup champion anyway. In 2000 Hewitt and Australia would again make the Davis Cup final but fell to Spain in Barcelona.

In 2001 Hewitt would again be a part of the Australian team that would make the Davis Cup final but the Australians would lose the fifth rubber and hand France a 3–2 win. Determined to make amends for his last few finals, Hewitt led the Australian team to the 2003 Davis Cup final against Spain where he defeated Juan Carlos Ferrero in five sets. The team came away victorious 3–1 overall and Hewitt claimed his second Davis Cup title. By the age of 22, he had recorded more wins in Davis Cup singles than any other Australian player. Following the retirement of Pat Rafter and the semi-retirement of Mark Philippoussis, Hewitt would be forced to lead the Australian Davis Cup team with little success from his peers. In the 2006 quarterfinals in Melbourne, Hewitt defeated Belarusian Vladimir Voltchkov in just 91 minutes. Voltchkov said before the match that "Hewitt has no weapons to hurt me." Hewitt responded, "Voltchkov doesn't have a ranking [of 457] to hurt me." In the semi-finals in Buenos Aires on clay, Hewitt lost to Argentine José Acasuso in five sets.

Despite a world group semi-final appearance in 2006, Hewitt and Australia would be relegated to the Asia/Oceania region in 2008. Hewitt continued showed his commitment to the team by competing in the regional ties but the team fell in the playoff stages every year between 2008 and 2011. In the 2011 playoffs, he played against Roger Federer and Stanislas Wawrinka on a grass court in Sydney, losing both matches. In doubles, together with Chris Guccione, he was able to defeat Federer and Wawrinka, but this was not enough to take Australia to the World Group.

In 2012, Hewitt won his single and doubles match against China in February, which allowed Australia to return to the playoffs where they lost to Germany. After defeating Chinese Taipei and Uzbekistan, Australia earned the right to get to the playoffs again in 2013. They ended up routing Poland 4–1 on their soil including a convincing 6–1 6–3 6–2 win for Hewitt over recent Wimbledon quarterfinalist Łukasz Kubot. In 2014, Australia crashed out 5–0 in the World Group first round on the French clay of La Roche-sur-Yon. Jo-Wilfried Tsonga beat Hewitt both in singles and doubles. Perth's grass courts would then be hosting yet another playoff tie for Australia in September 2014. Hewitt won both his singles match (against Farrukh Dustov) and the subsequent doubles rubber (partnering Chris Guccione v. Dustov and Istomin) in straight sets while up and coming Nick Kyrgios won his encounter with Denis Istomin to give Australia an unassailable 3–0 lead over Uzbekistan, thus enabling their country to return to the World Group in 2015. Sam Groth and Nick Kyrgios wrapped up a 5–0 victory a day later. Australia will open their 2015 campaign in Czech Republic for a 6–8 March tie that is one of two worst-case scenarios for Australia.

Hewitt played the Davis Cup match against Great Britain in the semi-finals of the 2015 Davis Cup. He played doubles with Sam Groth losing in five sets to brothers Andy and Jamie Murray.

He came out of retirement to play the first round match against the United States at the 2016 Davis Cup as a player-captain, where he and partner John Peers lost to the Bryan brothers in a five-setter.

He competed in the 2018 Davis Cup World Group play-offs, again as a player-captain in doubles with Peers. They won the rubber against the Austrian duo Oliver Marach and Jürgen Melzer in four sets.

Hewitt is the sole holder of several Australian Davis Cup records, which include most wins, most singles wins, most ties played and most years played. His Davis Cup career has included wins over players who were top ten at the time, which include Todd Martin, Marat Safin, Yevgeny Kafelnikov, Roger Federer, Gustavo Kuerten, Sébastien Grosjean and Juan Carlos Ferrero.

=== World Team Cup ===
Hewitt made his World Team Cup debut for Australia in 2000 at the age of 19. He recorded two singles victories over Albert Costa and Marcelo Ríos but fell to Yevgeny Kafelnikov in his last group stage match. Hewitt returned to the World Team Cup in 2001 and led Australia to the title by recording singles wins over Àlex Corretja, Magnus Norman, Tommy Haas in the group stages. In the final Hewitt defeated No. 2 Marat Safin.

Hewitt made his third appearance at the tournament in 2003 where he entered as the No. 1 singles player and went undefeated in his singles matches by recording wins over Jiří Novák, James Blake and Carlos Moyá but it was not enough to send Australia through to the final.

Fresh from their 2003 Davis Cup victory, Hewitt and Mark Philippoussis entered the 2004 World Team Cup with high hopes. In the group stages Hewitt recorded victories over Robby Ginepri and Martin Verkerk but fell to Gastón Gaudio in his last group singles match. Despite the loss, Australia still advanced to the final where Hewitt would lose to Fernando González and Australia would lose the final 2–1.

After a six-year hiatus Hewitt returned to compete in the 2010 World Team Cup and won his first match against John Isner but fell to Nicolás Almagro in his last match.

=== Olympics ===
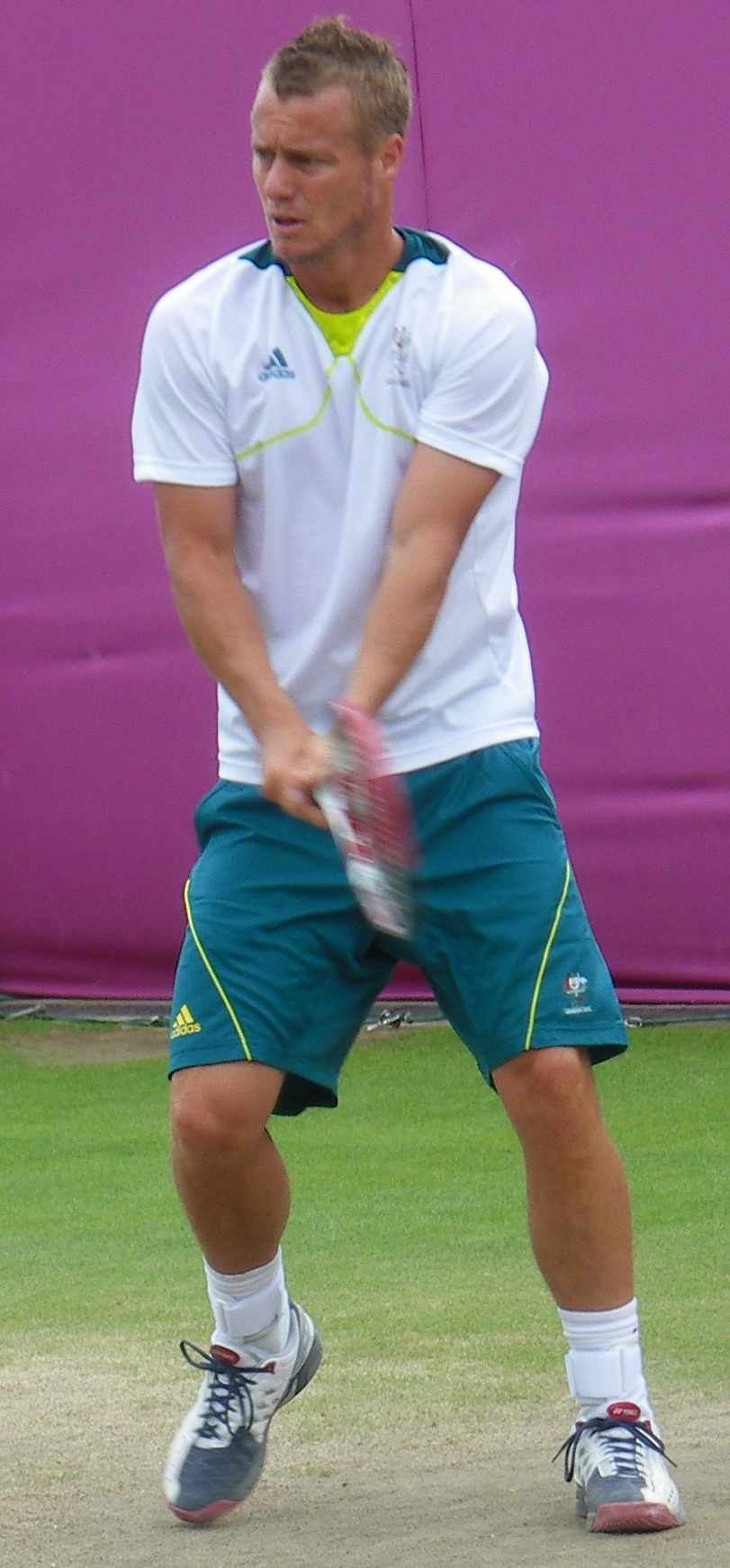
Hewitt at the London Olympics in 2012.

A 19-year-old Hewitt entered his first Olympics in 2000 and was given the fourth seeding in the draw. Hewitt was considered a strong favourite for a medal given his victory at the Sydney International earlier in the year but despite competing in his home nation Hewitt went out in the first round to Max Mirnyi 6–3 6–3. Hewitt elected not to compete in the 2004 Athens Olympic Games, deciding instead to focus on the 2004 US Open which would result in a runner-up showing. He would return for his second Olympic Games in Beijing for both the singles and doubles competitions. A first round 7–5 7–6 victory over Jonas Björkman would set up a second round clash with the number 2 seed Rafael Nadal. Nadal eliminated Hewitt in the second round 6–1 6–2 and would go on to win the singles gold medal. Pairing up with Chris Guccione in the doubles, the team would record victories over Agustín Calleri/Juan Mónaco and Rafael Nadal/Tommy Robredo before falling to the Bryan brothers in the quarterfinals.

Hewitt competed in his third Olympics in London 2012 where he entered the men's singles event and defeated Ukrainian Sergiy Stakhovsky in the first round. He was the only Australian in any tennis event to progress past the first round. In the second round Hewitt took out 13th seeded Croatian Marin Čilić. In the third round Hewitt stunned the tennis world when he won the first set against the number 2 ranked Novak Djokovic, he would end up falling in three sets. He also sent an application to the International Olympic Committee to enter the men's doubles competition with Chris Guccione but the application was rejected. Following his men's doubles rejection, Hewitt decided to apply for a spot in the mixed doubles competition with Sam Stosur. The pair were granted entry and defeated Polish pair Marcin Matkowski and Agnieszka Radwańska in the first round. In the quarterfinals, Hewitt/Stosur faced British pair Andy Murray and Laura Robson, they would lose the encounter.

== Coaches ==
Hewitt's coaches in his time on the ATP Tour:

- Peter Smith (January 1997 – December 1998)
- Darren Cahill (December 1998 – December 2001)
- Jason Stoltenberg (December 2001 – June 2003)
- Roger Rasheed (June 2003 – January 2007)
- Scott Draper (January 2007)
- Tony Roche (July 2007 – August 2009)
- Nathan Healey (August 2009 – August 2010)
- Brett Smith (August 2010 – November 2010)
- Tony Roche (November 2010 – January 2016)
- Peter Luczak (January 2013 – January 2016)

== Rivalries ==
=== Hewitt vs Federer ===
Hewitt and Roger Federer played each other on 27 occasions. Early in their careers, Hewitt dominated Federer, winning seven of their first nine meetings, including a victory from two sets down in the 2003 Davis Cup semi-final, which allowed Australia to defeat Switzerland. However, from 2004 onward, Federer dominated the rivalry, winning 16 of the last 18 meetings to finish with an 18–9 overall head-to-head record. This is Hewitt's longest rivalry as these two first played each other as juniors in 1996. They met in one Grand Slam final, the 2004 US Open final, where Federer won his first US Open title in a lopsided encounter in which Federer won the first and third sets 6–0 and the second set on a tiebreak. Federer met Hewitt at six of the Grand Slam tournaments in which he lifted the trophy, including all five of his triumphs between 2004 and 2005. Their last meeting was at the 2014 Brisbane International, where Hewitt triumphed over Federer in three sets, for his first title since 2010, when he also beat Federer to the Halle title.

Hewitt and Federer teamed up in the men's doubles at Wimbledon in 1999. They got to the third round before losing to Jonas Björkman and Pat Rafter.

=== Hewitt vs Roddick ===
Hewitt's second longest rivalry was against American Andy Roddick, in which the two played on 14 occasions. Early on, Hewitt dominated the rivalry, with six wins from their first seven meetings. One of those wins included a five-set victory at the 2001 US Open, the tournament in which Hewitt captured his first Singles Grand Slam title. In later years, Roddick began to dominate Hewitt, with the rivalry finishing at 7 wins each.

=== Hewitt vs Argentinian players ===
A rivalry and feud between Hewitt and Argentinian tennis players began at the 2002 Wimbledon final where Hewitt defeated Argentina's David Nalbandian in straight sets. The rivalry would hit boiling point in 2005 over a series of matches spread between the 2005 Australian Open and the 2005 Davis Cup Quarterfinals between Australia and Argentina. In the third round of 2005 Australian Open Hewitt faced Argentinian Juan Ignacio Chela in which Hewitt fired up Chela with his over-zealous celebrations for Chela's unforced errors, causing the Argentinian to spit at Hewitt during a change of ends. Hewitt would then face David Nalbandian in the quarterfinals on Australia Day with Hewitt coming out victorious 10–8 in the fifth set. Later in 2005 Hewitt would face Guillermo Coria in the Davis Cup quarterfinals, where their rivalry would flare up. It did, however, die down the following year in the 2006 Davis Cup semi-finals, where Argentina came out victorious 5–0 over Hewitt and the Australians.

== Playing style ==
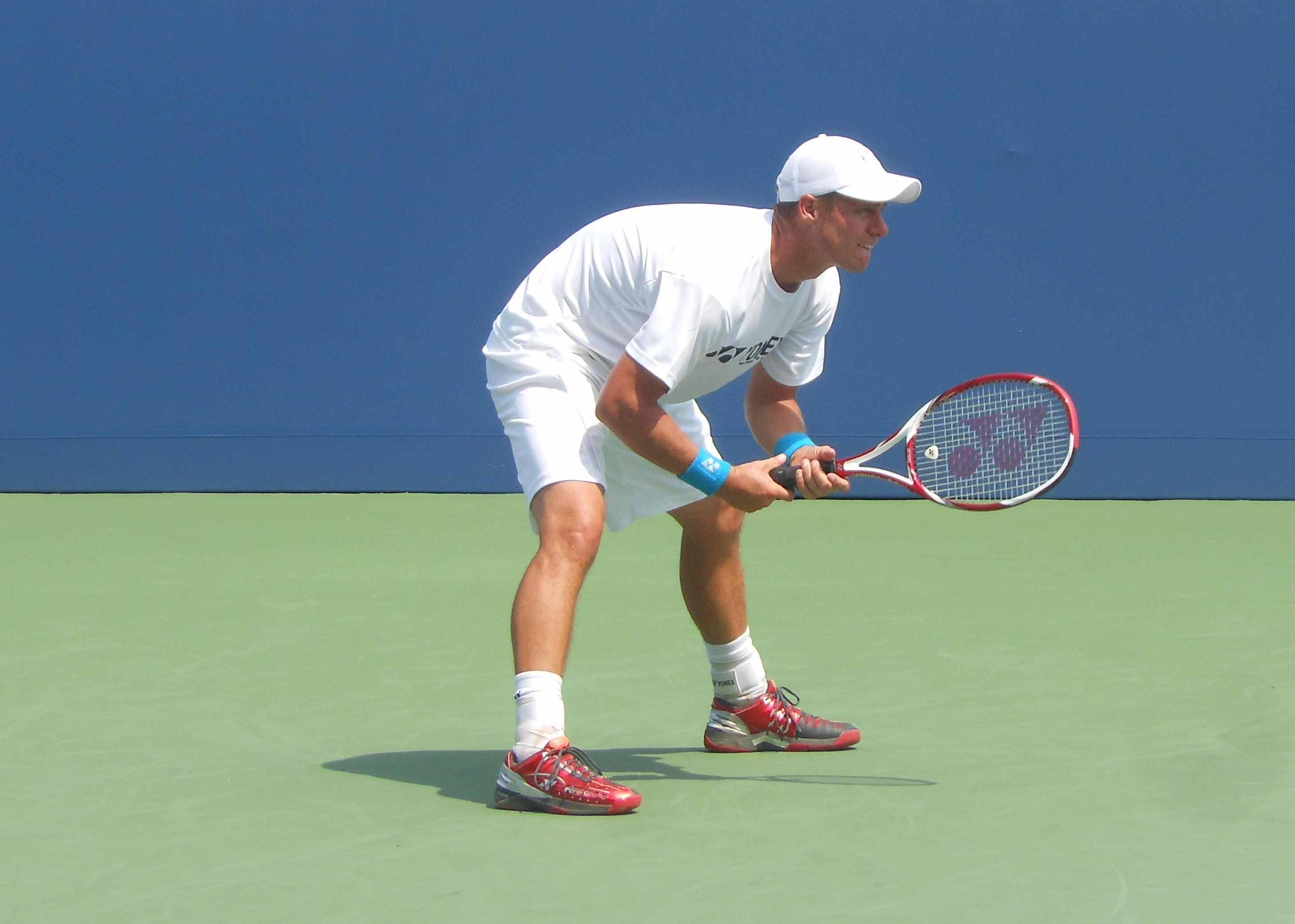
Lleyton Hewitt preparing to return a serve

Hewitt is a defensive counterpuncher. He typically likes to stay back towards the baseline during a rally and will usually approach the net only to catch a short reply or drop shot from his opponent. Hewitt's lack of penetration in his groundstrokes, most notably in his forehand, a typically dominant shot for most male players, forces him to rely on placement rather than simply "dominating" the point. At the 2004 Cincinnati Masters Final, commentator MaliVai Washington said that Hewitt was even more difficult to "ace" than Agassi because he gets more returns in play. Hewitt's tactics typically involve putting difficult service returns in play, consistently chasing down attempted winning shots from his opponent, and keeping the ball deep until he feels he can hit a winner.

Although he is known primarily as a baseliner, Hewitt is a skilled volleyer and is known for having one of the best overhead smashes in the game. His signature shot, however, is the offensive topspin lob, a shot that he executes efficiently off both wings when his opponent approaches the net. US Davis Cup captain Patrick McEnroe, Jim Courier and Tim Henman have all described Hewitt's lob as being the best in the world (although Henman has since declared Andy Murray to have succeeded him). In Andre Agassi's book "Open", Hewitt is described as one of the best shot selectors in the history of Men's Tennis.

== Awards ==
- 2001 – ATP Player of the Year
- 2001 – Most Popular South Australian
- 2002 – ATP Player of the Year
- 2002 – Australia's Male Athlete
- 2002 – ESPY Best Male Tennis Player
- 2003 – Young Australian of the Year
- 2003 – Vogue Australia Sportsman of the Year
- 2003 – Most Popular South Australian
- 2011 – Newcombe Medal. Spirit of Tennis Award
- 2013 – Newcombe Medal. Most outstanding Australian player in 2013
- Davis Cup Commitment Award
- 2016 – Member of the Order of Australia for significant service to tennis as a player at the national and international level, and to the community.
- 2025 - Inducted into Sport Australia Hall of Fame as athlete member.

== Equipment ==
In July 2000, Hewitt signed a multiyear endorsement deal with Nike. He is currently sponsored by American athletic apparel company Athletic DNA and the Japanese sports manufacturer Yonex, with whom he signed a "Head to Toe" deal in late 2005. Hewitt has used Yonex racquets as early as 2000, having used the Yonex Super RD Tour 95. Yonex provides Hewitt's racquets, shoes and accessories. Hewitt's Yonex shoes (SHT-306) are inscribed with his nickname "Rusty" along with an image of an Australian flag. As of 7 August 2007, his first appearance with a new racquet at the Montreal Masters, Hewitt used to use the Yonex RQiS 1 Tour. He used to use the Yonex RDS tour 90 Model, but switched to the Yonex RDiS 100 mid in 2009. In 2011, he switched to Yonex VCORE 95 D, using a grip size of 4 3/8 (L3). Since mid-2011, he began alternating between Yonex, Nike, Adidas, Asics and Fila shoes.

== Personal life ==
Hewitt is a keen supporter of Australian rules football, having played the game earlier in his career, and is currently the joint No. 1 ticket holder for the Adelaide Crows, alongside former Adelaide MP Kate Ellis. He had once had a close friendship with Crows star Andrew McLeod, but this broke down amid much public controversy in 2005. Hewitt had produced a DVD titled Lleyton Hewitt: The Other Side which precipitated the falling out between him and McLeod over filming of certain Aboriginal sites.

Hewitt and Belgian tennis player Kim Clijsters started a relationship in January 2000, during the Australian Open. The two announced their engagement just before Christmas 2003, but separated in October 2004, cancelling a planned February 2005 wedding.

On 30 January 2005, shortly after losing the 2005 Australian Open final to Marat Safin, Hewitt proposed to Australian actress Bec Cartwright after they had been dating for six weeks. They married on 21 July 2005 at the Sydney Opera House and they have three children together, including Cruz Hewitt.

In late 2008, to extend his tennis career and reduce the amount of tax he would otherwise have had to pay, Hewitt relocated his family for the European and North American season to their home in the Old Fort Bay estate, in Nassau, Bahamas.

Hewitt has a nickname, "Rusty", which was given to him by Darren Cahill who at the time thought Hewitt resembled the character Rusty, from the National Lampoon film series. Hewitt has also been given the nickname "Rocky", by fans, which originated from his shouts of "C'mon Balboa", in reference to the character Rocky Balboa from the Sylvester Stallone film Rocky. Hewitt has also been compared to the character.

During a interview on the 10th year anniversary of 9/11 Hewitt reflected on his 2001 U.S Open win two days prior. Hewitt was supposed to take photoshoot in the World Trade Center in Windows of the World with the trophy but changed plans to have the photoshoot at Grand Central Station instead.

In December 2021, Hewitt sold their family home in Toorak (Victoria), and purchased a new house in Burleigh Heads (Queensland) where he and his family planned to live but sold it in 2025 after failing to find time to visit.

== Controversies ==
Hewitt has been involved in several public controversies. He was involved in a racism dispute while playing the mixed-race American player James Blake at the 2001 US Open. After a black linesman called a foot-fault on two critical points in the third set, Hewitt implied that the similarity in skin colour between Blake and the official influenced the decision to penalise him.

At the 2001 French Open Hewitt twice called the chair umpire and net judge "spastics" and was subsequently forced to apologise following a public backlash.

In the 2005 Davis Cup rounds Hewitt was accused of using homophobic slurs toward competing players and Cup officials and refused to apologize after public backlash from Outsports.com., and which was documented as not the first such incident by the New York Times (10/28/05)

Hewitt's frequent "c'mons" when he won a point or his opponents made an error have been remarked upon as poor sportsmanship by opponents and media commentators. This behaviour particularly riled his 2005 Australian Open second-round opponent James Blake.

== Career statistics ==
=== Singles performance timeline ===
Key
| W | F | SF | QF | #R | RR | Q# | DNQ | A | NH |

(W) winner; (F) finalist; (SF) semifinalist; (QF) quarterfinalist; (#R) rounds 4, 3, 2, 1; (RR) round-robin stage; (Q#) qualification round; (DNQ) did not qualify; (A) absent; (NH) not held; (SR) strike rate (events won / competed); (W–L) win–loss record.

| Tournament | 1997 | 1998 | 1999 | 2000 | 2001 | 2002 | 2003 | 2004 | 2005 | 2006 | 2007 | 2008 | 2009 | 2010 | 2011 | 2012 | 2013 | 2014 | 2015 | 2016 | SR | W–L | Win% |
|---|---|---|---|---|---|---|---|---|---|---|---|---|---|---|---|---|---|---|---|---|---|---|---|
Grand Slam tournaments
| Australian Open | 1R | 1R | 2R | 4R | 3R | 1R | 4R | 4R | F | 2R | 3R | 4R | 1R | 4R | 1R | 4R | 1R | 1R | 2R | 2R | 0 / 20 | 32–20 | 62% |
| French Open | A | Q1 | 1R | 4R | QF | 4R | 3R | QF | A | 4R | 4R | 3R | 3R | 3R | A | 1R | 1R | 1R | A | A | 0 / 14 | 28–14 | 67% |
| Wimbledon | A | Q1 | 3R | 1R | 4R | W | 1R | QF | SF | QF | 4R | 4R | QF | 4R | 2R | 1R | 2R | 2R | 1R | A | 1 / 17 | 41–16 | 72% |
| US Open | A | Q2 | 3R | SF | W | SF | QF | F | SF | QF | 2R | A | 3R | 1R | A | 3R | 4R | 1R | 2R | A | 1 / 15 | 47–14 | 77% |
| Win–loss | 0–1 | 0–1 | 5–4 | 11–4 | 16–3 | 15–3 | 9–4 | 17–4 | 16–3 | 12–4 | 9–4 | 8–3 | 8–4 | 8–4 | 1–2 | 5–4 | 4–4 | 1–4 | 2–3 | 1–1 | 2 / 66 | 148–64 | 70% |
Year-end championship
| ATP Finals | Did not qualify | | | RR | W | W | DNQ | F | A | Did not qualify | | | | | | | | | | | 2 / 4 | 13–5 | 72% |

=== Grand Slam finals ===
==== Singles: 4 (2 titles, 2 runner-ups) ====
| Result | Year | Championship | Surface | Opponent | Score |
|---|---|---|---|---|---|
| Win | 2001 | US Open | Hard | (United States) Pete Sampras | 7–6^{(7–4)}, 6–1, 6–1 |
| Win | 2002 | Wimbledon | Grass | (Argentina) David Nalbandian | 6–1, 6–3, 6–2 |
| Loss | 2004 | US Open | Hard | (Switzerland) Roger Federer | 0–6, 6–7^{(3–7)}, 0–6 |
| Loss | 2005 | Australian Open | Hard | (Russia) Marat Safin | 6–1, 3–6, 4–6, 4–6 |

==== Doubles: 1 (1–0) ====
| Result | Year | Championship | Surface | Partner | Opponents | Score |
|---|---|---|---|---|---|---|
| Win | 2000 | US Open | Hard | (Belarus) Max Mirnyi | (South Africa) Ellis Ferreira (United States) Rick Leach | 6–4, 5–7, 7–6^{(7–5)} |

==== Mixed doubles: 1 (0–1) ====
| Result | Year | Championship | Surface | Partner | Opponents | Score |
|---|---|---|---|---|---|---|
| Loss | 2000 | Wimbledon | Grass | (Belgium) Kim Clijsters | (United States) Kimberly Po (United States) Donald Johnson | 4–6, 6–7^{(3–7)} |

=== Year-end championships finals ===
==== Singles: 3 (2–1) ====
| Result | Year | Championship | Surface | Opponent | Score |
|---|---|---|---|---|---|
| Win | 2001 | Sydney | Hard (i) | (France) Sébastien Grosjean | 6–3, 6–3, 6–4 |
| Win | 2002 | Shanghai | Hard (i) | (Spain) Juan Carlos Ferrero | 7–5, 7–5, 2–6, 2–6, 6–4 |
| Loss | 2004 | Houston | Hard | (Switzerland) Roger Federer | 3–6, 2–6 |

=== Masters Series finals ===
==== Singles: 7 (2–5) ====
| Result | Year | Tournament | Surface | Opponent | Score |
|---|---|---|---|---|---|
| Loss | 2000 | Stuttgart, Germany | Hard (i) | (South Africa) Wayne Ferreira | 6–7^{(6–8)}, 6–3, 7–6^{(7–5)}, 6–7^{(2–7)}, 2–6 |
| Win | 2002 | Indian Wells, US | Hard | (United Kingdom) Tim Henman | 6–1, 6–2 |
| Loss | 2002 | Cincinnati, US | Hard | (Spain) Carlos Moyá | 5–7, 6–7^{(5–7)} |
| Loss | 2002 | Paris, France | Carpet (i) | (Russia) Marat Safin | 6–7^{(4–7)}, 0–6, 4–6 |
| Win | 2003 | Indian Wells, US (2) | Hard | (Brazil) Gustavo Kuerten | 6–1, 6–1 |
| Loss | 2004 | Cincinnati, US | Hard | (United States) Andre Agassi | 3–6, 6–3, 2–6 |
| Loss | 2005 | Indian Wells, US | Hard | (Switzerland) Roger Federer | 2–6, 4–6, 4–6 |

== Records ==
| Event | Since | Record accomplished | Player matched |
|---|---|---|---|
| Grand Slam | 1877 | Youngest qualifier at the Australian Open (15 years, 11 months old), in 1997. | Stands alone |
| Grand Slam | 1877 | Youngest male doubles champion (19 years, 6 months old), at the 2000 US Open. | Stands alone |
| ATP Tour | 1970 | Lowest-ranked title winner (550), at the 1998 Adelaide International. | Stands alone |

== See also ==
- Lleyton Hewitt career statistics
- Wimbledon gentleman's singles champions
- US Open men's singles champions
- List of Grand Slam men's singles champions

== Notes ==
Sporting positions
| Preceded by: Gustavo Kuerten; Andre Agassi | World No. 1; 19 November 2001 – 27 April 2003; 12 May 2003 – 15 June 2003 | Succeeded by Andre Agassi; Andre Agassi |
| Preceded by First title | US Open Series Champion; 2004 | Succeeded by Andy Roddick |
Awards and achievements
| Preceded by Gustavo Kuerten | ATP Player of the Year; 2001–2002 | Succeeded by Andy Roddick |
| Preceded by Gustavo Kuerten | ITF World Champion; 2001–2002 | Succeeded by Andy Roddick |
| Preceded by Scott Hocknull | Young Australian of the Year; 2003 | Succeeded by Hugh Evans |
