= 2004 ATP Buenos Aires =

Tennis Tournament

- Date: 16–22 February
- Edition: 32nd
- Category: International Series
- Draw: 32S/16D
- Prize money: $355,000
- Surface: Clay / outdoor
- Location: Buenos Aires, Argentina
- Venue: Buenos Aires Lawn Tennis Club

Champions

Singles
- (Argentina) Guillermo Coria

Doubles
- (Argentina) Lucas Arnold / (Argentina) Mariano Hood
← 2003 ·	ATP Buenos Aires	· 2005 →

The 2004 ATP Buenos Aires was a men's tennis tournament played on outdoor clay courts at the Buenos Aires Lawn Tennis Club in Buenos Aires, Argentina and was part of the International Series of the 2004 ATP Tour. It was the 32nd edition of the tournament and was held from 16 February through 22 February 2004. First-seeded Guillermo Coria won the singles title.

== Finals ==
=== Singles ===
(Argentina) Guillermo Coria defeated (Spain) Carlos Moyá 6–4, 6–1

- It was Coria's 1st title of the year and the 7th of his career.

=== Doubles ===
(Argentina) Lucas Arnold / (Argentina) Mariano Hood defeated (Argentina) Federico Browne / (Argentina) Diego Veronelli 7–5, 6–7^{(2–7)}, 6–4

- It was Arnold's 1st title of the year and the 12th of his career. It was Hood's 1st title of the year and the 9th of his career.
