= 2003 Copa AT&T – Doubles =

Doubles
- 2003 Copa AT&T

Final
- Champions: (Argentina) Mariano Hood (Argentina) Sebastián Prieto
- Runners-up: (Argentina) Lucas Arnold (Argentina) David Nalbandian
- Score: 6–2, 6–2

Events
Singles	Doubles
← 2002 ·	Copa AT&T	· 2004 →

Gastón Etlis and Martín Rodríguez were the defending champions but lost in the first round to David Ferrer and Fernando Vicente.

Mariano Hood and Sebastián Prieto won in the final 6–2, 6–2 against Lucas Arnold and David Nalbandian.

== Seeds ==
1. (Argentina) Gastón Etlis / (Argentina) Martín Rodríguez (first round)
2. (Czech Republic) František Čermák / (Czech Republic) Leoš Friedl (semifinals)
3. (Sweden) Simon Aspelin / (Australia) Andrew Kratzmann (first round)
4. (United States) Devin Bowen / (Australia) Ashley Fisher (first round)

== Draw ==
=== Key ===
- Q = Qualifier
- WC = Wild card
- LL = Lucky loser
- Alt = Alternate
- SE = Special exempt
- PR = Protected ranking
- ITF = ITF entry
- JE = Junior exempt
- w/o = Walkover
- r = Retired
- d = Defaulted
- SR = Special ranking

First round
1	(Argentina) G Etlis (Argentina) M Rodríguez	4	6	4
(Spain) D Ferrer (Spain) F Vicente	6	3	6
WC	(Argentina) M Hood (Argentina) S Prieto	6	6
(Argentina) M García (Argentina) A Schneiter	4	1
3	(Sweden) S Aspelin (Australia) A Kratzmann	6	3	0
ALT	(Spain) A Martín (Spain) D Sánchez	3	6	6
(Argentina) A Calleri (Argentina) J I Chela	6	6
(Italy) E Artoni (Spain) A Portas	3	4
(Brazil) G Kuerten (Brazil) A Sá	4	6	3
(Argentina) L Arnold (Argentina) D Nalbandian	6	3	6
(Argentina) G Gaudio (Argentina) M Zabaleta	6	3	7^{8}
4	(United States) D Bowen (Australia) A Fisher	4	6	6^{6}
(Ecuador) N Lapentti (Argentina) L Lobo	2
(Argentina) J Acasuso (Chile) F González	2^{r}
WC	(Spain) F Clavet (Spain) C Moyá	6^{9}	2
2	(Czech Republic) F Čermák (Czech Republic) L Friedl	7^{11}	6

Quarterfinals
(Spain) D Ferrer (Spain) F Vicente	3	4
WC	(Argentina) M Hood (Argentina) S Prieto	6	6
ALT	(Spain) A Martín (Spain) D Sánchez	1	4
(Argentina) A Calleri (Argentina) J I Chela	6	6
(Argentina) L Arnold (Argentina) D Nalbandian	6	6
(Argentina) G Gaudio (Argentina) M Zabaleta	4	3
(Ecuador) N Lapentti (Argentina) L Lobo	4	3
2	(Czech Republic) F Čermák (Czech Republic) L Friedl	6	6

Semifinals
WC	(Argentina) M Hood (Argentina) S Prieto	7	6
(Argentina) A Calleri (Argentina) J I Chela	5	4
(Argentina) L Arnold (Argentina) D Nalbandian	5	6	6
2	(Czech Republic) F Čermák (Czech Republic) L Friedl	7	4	3

Final
WC	(Argentina) M Hood (Argentina) S Prieto	6	6
(Argentina) L Arnold (Argentina) D Nalbandian	2	2
