= 2004 Pacific Life Open – Men's singles =

Men's singles
- 2004 Pacific Life Open

Final
- Champion: (Switzerland) Roger Federer
- Runner-up: (United Kingdom) Tim Henman
- Score: 6–3, 6–3

Details
- Draw: 96
- Seeds: 32

Events
Singles	men	women
Doubles	men	women
← 2003 ·	Indian Wells Masters	· 2005 →

Roger Federer defeated Tim Henman in the final, 6–3, 6–3, to win the men's singles tennis title at the 2004 Indian Wells Masters.

Lleyton Hewitt was the two-time defending champion, but lost in the third round to Juan Ignacio Chela.

== Seeds ==
All thirty-three seeds received a bye to the second round.

1. (Switzerland) Roger Federer (champion)
2. (Spain) ~~Juan Carlos Ferrero~~ (withdrew due to illness)
3. (United States) Andy Roddick (quarterfinals)
4. (Argentina) Guillermo Coria (quarterfinals)
5. (United States) Andre Agassi (semifinals)
6. (Germany) Rainer Schüttler (second round)
7. (Spain) Carlos Moyá (second round)
8. (Australia) Lleyton Hewitt (third round)
9. (United Kingdom) Tim Henman (final)
10. (Thailand) Paradorn Srichaphan (second round)
11. (Chile) Nicolás Massú (second round, retired)
12. (Australia) Mark Philippoussis (second round)
13. (France) Sébastien Grosjean (fourth round)
14. (Netherlands) Sjeng Schalken (second round)
15. (Brazil) Gustavo Kuerten (second round)
16. (Czech Republic) Jiří Novák (third round)
17. (Netherlands) Martin Verkerk (second round)
18. (United States) Mardy Fish (fourth round)
19. (Spain) Tommy Robredo (second round)
20. (Spain) Feliciano López (second round)
21. (United States) Vince Spadea (third round)
22. (Argentina) Agustín Calleri (fourth round)
23. (Spain) Albert Costa (third round)
24. (France) Arnaud Clément (second round)
25. (Chile) Fernando González (third round)
26. (United States) Robby Ginepri (second round)
27. (Belarus) Max Mirnyi (third round)
28. (Sweden) Jonas Björkman (third round)
29. (Finland) Jarkko Nieminen (second round)
30. (Russia) Marat Safin (third round)
31. (Slovakia) Dominik Hrbatý (third round)
32. (Argentina) Juan Ignacio Chela (quarterfinals)
33. (Argentina) Gastón Gaudio (third round)

== Draw ==
=== Key ===
- Q = Qualifier
- WC = Wild card
- LL = Lucky loser
- Alt = Alternate
- SE = Special exempt
- PR = Protected ranking
- ITF = ITF entry
- JE = Junior exempt
- w/o = Walkover
- r = Retired
- d = Defaulted
- SR = Special ranking

=== Finals ===
Quarterfinals
1	(Switzerland) Roger Federer	6	6
32	(Argentina) Juan Ignacio Chela	2	1
4	(Argentina) Guillermo Coria	4	5
5	(United States) Andre Agassi	6	7
9	(United Kingdom) Tim Henman	6^{6}	7^{7}	6
3	(United States) Andy Roddick	7^{8}	6^{1}	3
(Georgia (country)) Irakli Labadze	6^{1}	6	6
(United States) James Blake	7^{7}	4	1

Semifinals
1	(Switzerland) Roger Federer	4	6	6
5	(United States) Andre Agassi	6	3	4
9	(United Kingdom) Tim Henman	6	6
(Georgia (country)) Irakli Labadze	3	2

Final
1	(Switzerland) Roger Federer	6	6
9	(United Kingdom) Tim Henman	3	3

=== Top half ===
==== Section 1 ====
First round
(Croatia) I Karlović	6^{10}	7^{7}	6^{4}
(Romania) A Pavel	7^{12}	6^{4}	7^{7}
(Austria) J Melzer	1	7^{7}	3
(Romania) V Hănescu	6	6^{5}	3
Q	(United States) G Weiner	6	4	6
(Czech Republic) B Ulihrach	4	6	4
(United States) T Martin	4	5
(France) A Dupuis	6	7

Second round
1	(Switzerland) R Federer	6	6
(Romania) A Pavel	1	1
(Romania) V Hănescu	6	3	4
25	(Chile) F González	3	6	6
18	(United States) M Fish	6	6
Q	(United States) G Weiner	4	4
(France) A Dupuis	2	0
16	(Czech Republic) J Novák	6	6

Third round
1	(Switzerland) R Federer	6	6
25	(Chile) F González	3	2
18	(United States) M Fish	6	6
16	(Czech Republic) J Novák	3	4

Fourth round
1	(Switzerland) R Federer	6	6
18	(United States) M Fish	4	1

==== Section 2 ====
First round
WC	(Sweden) T Enqvist	4	6	3
WC	(Germany) T Haas	6	3	6
(Italy) F Volandri	4	0^{r}
(Argentina) G Cañas	6	4
Q	(Canada) F Niemeyer	5	4
(Spain) A Martín	7	6
Q	(Russia) D Tursunov	4	7	2
(Sweden) T Johansson	6	5	6

Second round
10	(Thailand) P Srichaphan	1	2
WC	(Germany) T Haas	6	6
(Argentina) G Cañas	5	7^{7}	4
23	(Spain) A Costa	7	6^{3}	6
32	(Argentina) J I Chela	5	6	6
(Spain) A Martín	7	2	0
(Sweden) T Johansson	2	3
8	(Australia) L Hewitt	6	6

Third round
WC	(Germany) T Haas	7^{7}	3	6
23	(Spain) A Costa	6^{4}	6	3
32	(Argentina) J I Chela	6	4	6
8	(Australia) L Hewitt	3	6	1

Fourth round
WC	(Germany) T Haas	4	2
32	(Argentina) J I Chela	6	6

==== Section 3 ====
First round
(Croatia) M Ančić	6^{2}	6	1
(Armenia) S Sargsian	7^{7}	2	6
WC	(United States) A Bogomolov Jr.	6	6
LL	(United States) J Salzenstein	2	4
(Argentina) M Zabaleta	6^{3}	6^{6}
(Netherlands) R Sluiter	7^{7}	7^{8}
(Italy) D Sanguinetti	1	7^{7}	6
(France) F Santoro	6	6^{4}	4

Second round
4	(Argentina) G Coria	6	6
(Armenia) S Sargsian	3	4
WC	(United States) A Bogomolov Jr.	6^{4}	4
27	(Belarus) M Mirnyi	7^{7}	6
24	(France) A Clément	2	4
(Netherlands) R Sluiter	6	6
(Italy) D Sanguinetti	2	2
13	(France) S Grosjean	6	6

Third round
4	(Argentina) G Coria	6	7
27	(Belarus) M Mirnyi	4	5
(Netherlands) R Sluiter	7^{7}	4	4
13	(France) S Grosjean	6^{4}	6	6

Fourth round
4	(Argentina) G Coria	3	7^{7}	6
13	(France) S Grosjean	6	6^{2}	2

==== Section 4 ====
First round
(South Korea) H-T Lee	6	3	1
(Russia) M Youzhny	3	6	6
(South Africa) W Moodie	2	6^{4}
(Peru) L Horna	6	7^{7}
(Belgium) X Malisse	6	6
(Slovakia) K Beck	3	3
(Spain) D Sánchez	4	6	6
(France) C Saulnier	6	4	2

Second round
12	(Australia) M Philippoussis	6^{5}	5
(Russia) M Youzhny	7^{7}	7
(Peru) L Horna	6	7^{7}
20	(Spain) F López	3	6^{3}
31	(Slovakia) D Hrbatý	6	6
(Belgium) X Malisse	4	3
(Spain) D Sánchez	2	2
5	(United States) A Agassi	6	6

Third round
(Russia) M Youzhny	7^{14}	6
(Peru) L Horna	6^{12}	2
31	(Slovakia) D Hrbatý	2	4
5	(United States) A Agassi	6	6

Fourth round
(Russia) M Youzhny	5	2
5	(United States) A Agassi	7	6

=== Bottom half ===
==== Section 5 ====
First round
Q	(Australia) W Arthurs	6	6
Q	(Argentina) F Browne	3	2
Q	(Israel) H Levy	6	5	6
(United States) B Vahaly	2	7	3
(Spain) D Ferrer	6^{6}	6	5
WC	(Spain) À Corretja	7^{8}	3	7
(Spain) F Mantilla	0	6	5
Q	(Canada) S Larose	6	4	7

Second round
6	(Germany) R Schüttler	1	6^{3}
Q	(Australia) W Arthurs	6	7^{7}
Q	(Israel) H Levy	1	3
28	(Sweden) J Björkman	6	6
19	(Spain) T Robredo	1	4
WC	(Spain) À Corretja	6	6
Q	(Canada) S Larose	3	2
9	(United Kingdom) T Henman	6	6

Third round
Q	(Australia) W Arthurs	4	6	6
28	(Sweden) J Björkman	6	2	3
WC	(Spain) À Corretja	4	4
9	(United Kingdom) T Henman	6	6

Fourth round
Q	(Australia) W Arthurs	1	3
9	(United Kingdom) T Henman	6	6

==== Section 6 ====
First round
Q	(Spain) F Verdasco	6^{2}	7	6^{5}
(France) N Escudé	7^{7}	5	7^{7}
(Germany) N Kiefer	2	5
(Brazil) F Saretta	6	7
Q	(Czech Republic) J Hernych	2	6	6
(Russia) N Davydenko	6	4	1
(United States) J-M Gambill	6	3	6
Q	(Netherlands) J van Lottum	3	6	2

Second round
14	(Netherlands) S Schalken	3	2
(France) N Escudé	6	6
(Brazil) F Saretta	3	2
21	(United States) V Spadea	6	6
WC/30	(Russia) M Safin	6	7^{7}
Q	(Czech Republic) J Hernych	4	6^{3}
(United States) J-M Gambill	6^{3}	2
3	(United States) A Roddick	7^{7}	6

Third round
(France) N Escudé	3	6	7^{7}
21	(United States) V Spadea	6	4	6^{5}
WC/30	(Russia) M Safin	6^{6}	2
3	(United States) A Roddick	7^{8}	6

Fourth round
(France) N Escudé	3	2
3	(United States) A Roddick	6	6

==== Section 7 ====
First round
(Georgia (country)) I Labadze	7^{7}	6
Q	(France) T Ascione	6^{3}	4
(Morocco) H Arazi	6	6
(Belgium) O Rochus	4	2
(Croatia) I Ljubičić	3	6^{5}
(Sweden) R Söderling	6	7^{7}
(Germany) L Burgsmüller	2	3
(Spain) R Nadal	6	6

Second round
7	(Spain) C Moyá	6	1	3
(Georgia (country)) I Labadze	2	6	6
(Morocco) H Arazi	6	6
29	(Finland) J Nieminen	3	3
22	(Argentina) A Calleri	6	3	6
(Sweden) R Söderling	4	6	3
(Spain) R Nadal	6	1
11	(Chile) N Massú	3	0^{r}

Third round
(Georgia (country)) I Labadze	6	6
(Morocco) H Arazi	3	4
22	(Argentina) A Calleri	6	3	7^{12}
(Spain) R Nadal	4	6	6^{10}

Fourth round
(Georgia (country)) I Labadze	1	6	6
22	(Argentina) A Calleri	6	3	4

==== Section 8 ====
First round
Q	(Ecuador) G Lapentti	6	4	4
(United States) T Dent	1	6	6
(Spain) R Ramírez Hidalgo	2	3
(Ecuador) N Lapentti	6	6
(United States) J Blake	6	6
(Czech Republic) R Štěpánek	2	2
(Russia) I Andreev	4	2
(South Africa) W Ferreira	6	6

Second round
15	(Brazil) G Kuerten	5	4
(United States) T Dent	7	6
(Ecuador) N Lapentti	7	6
17	(Netherlands) M Verkerk	5	4
26	(United States) R Ginepri	4	5
(United States) J Blake	6	7
(South Africa) W Ferreira	2	5
33	(Argentina) G Gaudio	6	7

Third round
(United States) T Dent	6	6
(Ecuador) N Lapentti	3	2
(United States) J Blake	3	6	6
33	(Argentina) G Gaudio	6	2	3

Fourth round
(United States) T Dent	6^{4}	6	1
(United States) J Blake	7^{7}	4	6
