= 2004 Hamburg Masters – Singles =

Singles
- 2004 Hamburg Masters

Final
- Champion: (Switzerland) Roger Federer
- Runner-up: (Argentina) Guillermo Coria
- Score: 4–6, 6–4, 6–2, 6–3

Details
- Draw: 64
- Seeds: 16

Events
Singles	Doubles
← 2003 ·	Hamburg Masters	· 2005 →

Roger Federer defeated the defending champion Guillermo Coria in the final, 4–6, 6–4, 6–2, 6–3 to win the singles tennis title at the 2004 Hamburg European Open.

== Seeds ==
A champion seed is indicated in bold text while text in italics indicates the round in which that seed was eliminated.

1. (Switzerland) **Roger Federer (champion)**
2. (Argentina) Guillermo Coria (final)
3. (Spain) ~~Juan Carlos Ferrero~~ (withdrew because of a hand injury)
4. (Germany) Rainer Schüttler (first round)
5. (United Kingdom) Tim Henman (second round)
6. (Argentina) David Nalbandian (first round)
7. (Spain) Carlos Moyà (quarterfinals)
8. (France) Sébastien Grosjean (first round)
9. (Chile) Nicolas Massú (first round)
10. (Australia) Mark Philippoussis (first round)
11. (Thailand) Paradorn Srichaphan (first round)
12. (Netherlands) Martin Verkerk (first round)
13. (Chile) Fernando González (third round)
14. (Netherlands) Sjeng Schalken (first round, retired because of a leg injury)
15. (Czech Republic) Jiří Novák (first round)
16. (Spain) Tommy Robredo (third round)
17. (Australia) Lleyton Hewitt (semifinals)

== Draw ==
=== Key ===
- Q = Qualifier
- WC = Wild card
- LL = Lucky loser
- Alt = Alternate
- SE = Special exempt
- PR = Protected ranking
- ITF = ITF entry
- JE = Junior exempt
- w/o = Walkover
- r = Retired
- d = Defaulted
- SR = Special ranking

=== Finals ===
Semifinals
1	(Switzerland) **Roger Federer**	**6**	**6**
17	(Australia) Lleyton Hewitt	0	4
(Croatia) Ivan Ljubičić	**6**	1	4
2	(Argentina) **Guillermo Coria**	3	**6**	**6**

Final
1	(Switzerland) **Roger Federer**	4	**6**	**6**	**6**
2	(Argentina) Guillermo Coria	**6**	4	2	3

=== Top half ===
==== Section 1 ====
First round
1	(Switzerland) **R Federer**	**6**	5	**6**
(Argentina) G Gaudio	1	**7**	4
(Italy) F Volandri	4	1
(Ecuador) **N Lapentti**	**6**	**6**
Q	(Austria) **J Knowle**	**6**	**6**
(United States) R Ginepri	1	3
(Spain) F López	6^{4}	4
13	(Chile) **F González**	**7^{7}**	**6**
10	(Australia) M Philippoussis	6^{5}	1
(Sweden) **J Johansson**	**7^{7}**	**6**
(Spain) **F Verdasco**	**7^{7}**	**7^{9}**
(Argentina) G Cañas	6^{3}	6^{7}
(Spain) **A Martín**	4	**6**	**6**
(Morocco) H Arazi	**6**	2	2
(Spain) D Sánchez	5	4
7	(Spain) **C Moyà**	**7**	**6**

Second round
1	(Switzerland) **R Federer**	**6**	**6**
(Ecuador) N Lapentti	3	3
Q	(Austria) J Knowle	**6**	4	2
13	(Chile) **F González**	0	**6**	**6**
(Sweden) J Johansson	6^{4}	1
(Spain) **F Verdasco**	**7^{7}**	**6**
(Spain) A Martín	2	3
7	(Spain) **C Moyà**	**6**	**6**

Third round
1	(Switzerland) **R Federer**	**7**	**6**
13	(Chile) F González	5	1
(Spain) F Verdasco	4	**6**	4
7	(Spain) **C Moyà**	**6**	3	**6**

Quarterfinals
1	(Switzerland) **R Federer**	**6**	**6**
7	(Spain) C Moyà	4	3

==== Section 2 ====
First round
17	(Australia) **L Hewitt**	**6**	**7^{7}**
(Sweden) J Björkman	0	6^{5}
(United States) V Spadea	0	r
WC	(Germany) **T Haas**	**6**
(Brazil) **F Saretta**	**7^{7}**	**7^{7}**
WC	(Germany) M Abel	6^{4}	6^{3}
LL	(Spain) **Ó Hernández**	5
14	(Netherlands) S Schalken	1^{r}
9	(Chile) N Massú	3	0
(Austria) **J Melzer**	**6**	**6**
(Argentina) J I Chela	0	**6**	6^{1}
(Georgia (country)) **I Labadze**	**6**	3	**7^{7}**
(Armenia) **S Sargsian**	**6**	**6**
(Russia) N Davydenko	2	4
(Russia) **M Safin**	**7^{8}**	**7**
8	(France) S Grosjean	6^{6}	5

Second round
17	(Australia) **L Hewitt**	**6**	**7**
WC	(Germany) T Haas	4	5
(Brazil) **F Saretta**	**6**	**6**
LL	(Spain) Ó Hernández	4	3
(Austria) **J Melzer**	**6**	**6**
(Georgia (country)) I Labadze	1	0
(Armenia) S Sargsian	**6**	3	3
(Russia) **M Safin**	4	**6**	**6**

Third round
17	(Australia) **L Hewitt**	**6**	2	**6**
(Brazil) F Saretta	4	**6**	4
(Austria) **J Melzer**	**6**	**6**
(Russia) M Safin	4	4

Quarterfinals
17	(Australia) **L Hewitt**	**6**	**6**
(Austria) J Melzer	4	3

=== Bottom half ===
==== Section 3 ====
First round
5	(United Kingdom) **T Henman**	**7**	1	**6**
Q	(Italy) A Seppi	5	**6**	3
(Romania) **A Pavel**	**6**	**7**
Q	(France) C Saulnier	2	5
(Romania) **V Hănescu**	**7^{9}**	3	**6**
(Belarus) M Mirnyi	6^{7}	**6**	3
(Croatia) **I Ljubičić**	**7**	**7^{7}**
12	(Netherlands) M Verkerk	5	6^{4}
15	(Czech Republic) J Novák	6^{5}	**6**	4
WC	(Germany) **F Mayer**	**7^{7}**	3	**6**
Q	(Spain) **A Portas**	**7**	**6**
Q	(Spain) À Corretja	5	4
(Russia) **M Youzhny**	**6**	6^{2}	**6**
(Germany) N Kiefer	4	**7^{7}**	2
WC	(Germany) **L Burgsmüller**	**6**	6^{5}	**6**
4	(Germany) R Schüttler	4	**7^{7}**	4

Second round
5	(United Kingdom) T Henman	2	2
(Romania) **A Pavel**	**6**	**6**
(Romania) V Hănescu	0	**6**	6^{3}
(Croatia) **I Ljubičić**	**6**	3	**7^{7}**
WC	(Germany) **F Mayer**	**6**	**6**
Q	(Spain) A Portas	3	4
(Russia) **M Youzhny**	**7**	**7**
WC	(Germany) L Burgsmüller	5	5

Third round
(Romania) A Pavel	**6**	4	3
(Croatia) **I Ljubičić**	4	**6**	**6**
WC	(Germany) F Mayer	0	6^{4}
(Russia) **M Youzhny**	**6**	**7^{7}**

Quarterfinals
(Croatia) **I Ljubičić**	4	**7**	**6**
(Russia) M Youzhny	**6**	5	1

==== Section 4 ====
First round
6	(Argentina) D Nalbandian	2	3
(Spain) **D Ferrer**	**6**	**6**
(Slovakia) **D Hrbatý**	2	**6**	**6**
Q	(France) T Ascione	**6**	3	4
(Spain) **Á Costa**	**6**	**6**
(Belgium) X Malisse	3	4
Q	(Belgium) **O Rochus**	**6**	**6**
11	(Thailand) P Srichaphan	3	4
16	(Spain) **T Robredo**	**6**	**6**
(France) A Dupuis	2	0
(Sweden) R Söderling	**6**	1	4
(Argentina) **M Zabaleta**	3	**6**	**6**
(France) A Clément	2	3
(Peru) **L Horna**	**6**	**6**
Q	(Spain) N Almagro	**6**	4	5
2	(Argentina) **G Coria**	3	**6**	**7**

Second round
(Spain) **D Ferrer**	**6**	**6**
(Slovakia) D Hrbatý	0	3
(Spain) **Á Costa**	**7**	**6**
Q	(Belgium) O Rochus	5	4
16	(Spain) **T Robredo**	**6**	**6**
(Argentina) M Zabaleta	4	2
(Peru) L Horna	2	**6**	2
2	(Argentina) **G Coria**	**6**	3	**6**

Third round
(Spain) **D Ferrer**	5	**6**	**6**
(Spain) Á Costa	**7**	4	3
16	(Spain) T Robredo	6^{2}	4
2	(Argentina) **G Coria**	**7^{7}**	**6**

Quarterfinals
(Spain) D Ferrer	2	2
2	(Argentina) **G Coria**	**6**	**6**
