= 2003 Copa AT&T =

- Date: 17–23 February
- Edition: 31st
- Category: International Series
- Draw: 32S / 16D
- Prize money: $355,000
- Surface: Clay / outdoor
- Location: Buenos Aires, Argentina
- Venue: Buenos Aires Lawn Tennis Club

Champions

Singles
- (Spain) Carlos Moyá

Doubles
- (Argentina) Mariano Hood / (Argentina) Sebastián Prieto
- ATP Buenos Aires

The 2003 Copa AT&T was a men's tennis tournament played on outdoor clay courts at the Buenos Aires Lawn Tennis Club in Buenos Aires, Argentina and was part of the International Series of the 2003 ATP Tour. It was the 31st edition of the tournament and was held from 17 February through 23 February 2003. First-seeded Carlos Moyá won the singles title.

== Finals ==
=== Singles ===
(Spain) Carlos Moyá defeated (Argentina) Guillermo Coria 6–3, 4–6, 6–4

- It was Moyà's 1st title of the year and the 12th of his career.

=== Doubles ===
(Argentina) Mariano Hood/ (Argentina) Sebastián Prieto defeated (Argentina) Lucas Arnold / (Argentina) David Nalbandian 6–2, 6–2

- It was Hood's 2nd title of the year and the 6th of his career. It was Prieto's only title of the year and the 4th of his career.
