= 2004 ATP Buenos Aires – Doubles =

Doubles
- 2004 ATP Buenos Aires

Final
- Champions: (Argentina) Lucas Arnold (Argentina) Mariano Hood
- Runners-up: (Argentina) Federico Browne (Argentina) Diego Veronelli
- Score: 7–5, 6–7^{(2–7)}, 6–4

Events
Singles	Doubles
← 2003 ·	ATP Buenos Aires	· 2005 →

Mariano Hood and Sebastián Prieto were the defending champions but they competed with different partners that year, Hood with Lucas Arnold and Prieto with Martín García.

García and Prieto lost in the first round to Juan Ignacio Chela and Nicolás Massú.

Arnold and Hood won in the final 7–5, 6–7^{(2–7)}, 6–4 against Federico Browne and Diego Veronelli.

== Seeds ==
1. (Argentina) Lucas Arnold / (Argentina) Mariano Hood (champions)
2. (Czech Republic) František Čermák / (Czech Republic) Leoš Friedl (semifinals)
3. (Sweden) Simon Aspelin / (Italy) Massimo Bertolini (first round)
4. (Argentina) Martín García / (Argentina) Sebastián Prieto (first round)

== Draw ==
=== Key ===
- Q = Qualifier
- WC = Wild card
- LL = Lucky loser
- Alt = Alternate
- SE = Special exempt
- PR = Protected ranking
- ITF = ITF entry
- JE = Junior exempt
- w/o = Walkover
- r = Retired
- d = Defaulted
- SR = Special ranking

First round
1	(Argentina) L Arnold (Argentina) M Hood	3	6	7
(Poland) M Fyrstenberg (Poland) M Matkowski	6	3	5
(Argentina) A Calleri (Argentina) G Cañas	6	6
(Spain) D Ferrer (Spain) R Ramírez Hidalgo	1	2
4	(Argentina) M García (Argentina) S Prieto	3	4
(Argentina) J I Chela (Chile) N Massú	6	6
WC	(Argentina) G Coria (Argentina) J Mónaco	6	6
(Spain) Á López Morón (Spain) A Portas	4	4
(United States) D Bowen (Australia) A Fisher	6
(Argentina) J Acasuso (Spain) D Sánchez	4	r
WC	(Argentina) F Browne (Argentina) D Veronelli	6	7^{7}
3	(Sweden) S Aspelin (Italy) M Bertolini	2	6^{2}
(Italy) E Artoni (Argentina) A Schneiter	6
(Argentina) M Vassallo Argüello (Italy) F Volandri	2	r
(Ecuador) N Lapentti (Argentina) M Rodríguez	4	2
2	(Czech Republic) F Čermák (Czech Republic) L Friedl	6	6

Quarterfinals
1	(Argentina) L Arnold (Argentina) M Hood	7^{7}	6
(Argentina) A Calleri (Argentina) G Cañas	6^{0}	2
(Argentina) J I Chela (Chile) N Massú	7	6
WC	(Argentina) G Coria (Argentina) J Mónaco	5	2
(United States) D Bowen (Australia) A Fisher	2	4
WC	(Argentina) F Browne (Argentina) D Veronelli	6	6
(Italy) E Artoni (Argentina) A Schneiter	6^{6}	4
2	(Czech Republic) F Čermák (Czech Republic) L Friedl	7^{8}	6

Semifinals
1	(Argentina) L Arnold (Argentina) M Hood	w/o
(Argentina) J I Chela (Chile) N Massú
WC	(Argentina) F Browne (Argentina) D Veronelli	2	7	6
2	(Czech Republic) F Čermák (Czech Republic) L Friedl	6	5	4

Final
1	(Argentina) L Arnold (Argentina) M Hood	7	6^{2}	6
WC	(Argentina) F Browne (Argentina) D Veronelli	5	7^{7}	4
