= 2004 ATP Buenos Aires – Singles =

Singles
- 2004 ATP Buenos Aires

Final
- Champion: (Argentina) Guillermo Coria
- Runner-up: (Spain) Carlos Moyá
- Score: 6–4, 6–1

Details
- Draw: 32
- Seeds: 8

Events
Singles	Doubles
← 2003 ·	ATP Buenos Aires	· 2005 →

Carlos Moyá was the defending champion but lost in the final 6–4, 6–1 against Guillermo Coria.

== Seeds ==
1. (Argentina) Guillermo Coria (champion)
2. (Spain) Carlos Moyá (final)
3. (Chile) Nicolás Massú (quarterfinals)
4. (Brazil) Gustavo Kuerten (first round)
5. (Argentina) Agustín Calleri (second round)
6. (Argentina) Mariano Zabaleta (quarterfinals)
7. (Argentina) Gastón Gaudio (first round)
8. (Argentina) Juan Ignacio Chela (second round)

== Draw ==
=== Key ===
- Q = Qualifier
- WC = Wild card
- LL = Lucky loser
- Alt = Alternate
- SE = Special exempt
- PR = Protected ranking
- ITF = ITF entry
- JE = Junior exempt
- w/o = Walkover
- r = Retired
- d = Defaulted
- SR = Special ranking

=== Finals ===
Semifinals
1	(Argentina) Guillermo Coria	7^{7}	6
(France) Richard Gasquet	6^{1}	1
(Argentina) José Acasuso	6^{3}	5
2	(Spain) Carlos Moyá	7^{7}	7

Final
1	(Argentina) Guillermo Coria	6	6
2	(Spain) Carlos Moyá	4	1

=== Top half ===
First round
1	(Argentina) G Coria	6	6
(Peru) L Horna	1	2
WC	(Argentina) F Squillari	6	6
Q	(Spain) M López	0	1
(Ecuador) N Lapentti	6^{2}	1
WC	(Argentina) J Mónaco	7^{7}	6
Q	(Ecuador) G Lapentti	5	0
8	(Argentina) J I Chela	7	6
3	(Chile) N Massú	6	6
(Spain) A Montañés	1	3
WC	(Argentina) G Cañas	3	6	2
(Italy) F Volandri	6	4	6
(France) R Gasquet	2	7	6
(Spain) F Verdasco	6	5	1
(Spain) G Blanco	4	2
5	(Argentina) A Calleri	6	6

Second round
1	(Argentina) G Coria	6	4	6
WC	(Argentina) F Squillari	3	6	1
WC	(Argentina) J Mónaco	7^{7}	6
8	(Argentina) J I Chela	6^{4}	3
3	(Chile) N Massú	6	6
(Italy) F Volandri	2	4
(France) R Gasquet	7	6
5	(Argentina) A Calleri	5	2

Quarterfinals
1	(Argentina) G Coria	7^{10}	3	6
WC	(Argentina) J Mónaco	6^{8}	6	1
3	(Chile) N Massú	3	6	5
(France) R Gasquet	6	4	7

Semifinals
1	(Argentina) G Coria	7^{7}	6
(France) R Gasquet	6^{1}	1

=== Bottom half ===
First round
7	(Argentina) G Gaudio	3	6^{6}
(Argentina) J Acasuso	6	7^{8}
Q	(France) O Patience	6	6
(Spain) A Portas	4	3
(Brazil) F Saretta	6	6
(Germany) T Behrend	4	2
(Spain) D Ferrer	6	7
4	(Brazil) G Kuerten	3	5
6	(Argentina) M Zabaleta	6	6
(Monaco) J-R Lisnard	4	4
Q	(Argentina) D Moyano	1	6	4
(Spain) Ó Hernández	6	4	6
(Spain) R Ramírez Hidalgo	6	0	1
(Spain) D Sánchez	3	6	6
(Israel) H Levy	2	4
2	(Spain) C Moyá	6	6

Second round
(Argentina) J Acasuso	3	7^{11}	6
Q	(France) O Patience	6	6^{9}	4
(Brazil) F Saretta	6^{1}	6	2
(Spain) D Ferrer	7^{7}	3	6
6	(Argentina) M Zabaleta	6	6
(Spain) Ó Hernández	1	4
(Spain) D Sánchez	6^{5}	6	6^{5}
2	(Spain) C Moyá	7^{7}	1	7^{7}

Quarterfinals
(Argentina) J Acasuso	7	7^{7}
(Spain) D Ferrer	5	6^{5}
6	(Argentina) M Zabaleta	6	6^{4}	4
2	(Spain) C Moyá	4	7^{7}	6

Semifinals
(Argentina) J Acasuso	6^{3}	5
2	(Spain) C Moyá	7^{7}	7
