= Diego Veronelli =

Argentine tennis player

- Country (sports): Argentina
- Born: 5 December 1979 (age 46) Buenos Aires, Argentina
- Height: 1.93 m (6 ft 4 in)
- Turned pro: 1996
- Plays: Right-handed
- Prize money: $179,686

Singles
- Career record: 2–3
- Career titles: 0
- Highest ranking: No. 165 (12 Jan 2004)

Grand Slam singles results
- Australian Open: Q2 (2002, 2004)
- French Open: Q1 (2004)
- Wimbledon: Q3 (2002)
- US Open: Q3 (2001)

Doubles
- Career record: 4–2
- Career titles: 0
- Highest ranking: No. 171 (21 Jun 2004)

Diego Veronelli (Spanish pronunciation: [ˈdjeɣo βeɾoˈneli]; (Note: In isolation, Veronelli is pronounced [beɾoˈneli].) born 5 December 1979) is a former professional tennis player from Argentina.

== Career ==
Veronelli was a quarter-finalist in the 2003 Campionati Internazionali di Sicilia. He upset second seed Nikolay Davydenko in the opening round and then had a win over Victor Hănescu. In the quarter-finals he was defeated by Paul-Henri Mathieu.

He and partner Federico Browne were doubles runners-up at Buenos Aires in 2004. The wild card entrants beat both the second and third seeds en route to the final.

The Buenos Aires born player was a member of the Argentine team which won the 2010 World Team Cup. His only appearance in the campaign came after the title was secured, with he and Eduardo Schwank losing a dead rubber to Bob and Mike Bryan.

In 2013 he was married to Susana González and had a baby, Mateo Verronelli. Now he is tennis trainer all over the world.

== ATP career finals ==
=== Doubles: 1 (0–1) ===
Result	W–L	Date	Tournament	Surface	Partner	Opponents	Score
Loss	0–1	Feb 2004	Buenos Aires, Argentina	Clay	(Argentina) Federico Browne	(Argentina) Lucas Arnold Ker (Argentina) Mariano Hood	5–7, 7–6^{(7–2)}, 4–6
