= 2004 Pacific Life Open – Men's doubles =

Men's doubles
- 2004 Pacific Life Open

Final
- Champions: (France) Arnaud Clément (France) Sébastien Grosjean
- Runners-up: (Zimbabwe) Wayne Black (Zimbabwe) Kevin Ullyett
- Score: 6–3, 4–6, 7–5

Events
Singles	men	women
Doubles	men	women
← 2003 ·	Pacific Life Open	· 2005 →

Wayne Ferreira and Yevgeny Kafelnikov were the defending champions but did not compete that year.

Arnaud Clément and Sébastien Grosjean won in the final 6–3, 4–6, 7–5 against Wayne Black and Kevin Ullyett.

== Seeds ==
1. (United States) Bob Bryan / (United States) Mike Bryan (second round)
2. (India) Mahesh Bhupathi / (Belarus) Max Mirnyi (semifinals)
3. (Sweden) Jonas Björkman / (Australia) Todd Woodbridge (first round)
4. (Australia) Wayne Arthurs / (Australia) Paul Hanley (quarterfinals)
5. (The Bahamas) Mark Knowles / (Canada) Daniel Nestor (semifinals)
6. (Czech Republic) Martin Damm / (Czech Republic) Cyril Suk (quarterfinals)
7. (India) Leander Paes / (Czech Republic) David Rikl (first round)
8. (Argentina) Mariano Hood / (Argentina) Martín Rodríguez (first round)

== Draw ==
=== Key ===
- Q = Qualifier
- WC = Wild card
- LL = Lucky loser
- Alt = Alternate
- SE = Special exempt
- PR = Protected ranking
- ITF = ITF entry
- JE = Junior exempt
- w/o = Walkover
- r = Retired
- d = Defaulted
- SR = Special ranking

=== Finals ===
Semifinals
(France) Arnaud Clément (France) Sébastien Grosjean	6	2	6
5	(The Bahamas) Mark Knowles (Canada) Daniel Nestor	1	6	1
(Zimbabwe) Wayne Black (Zimbabwe) Kevin Ullyett	6	6
2	(India) Mahesh Bhupathi (Belarus) Max Mirnyi	4	4

Final
(France) Arnaud Clément (France) Sébastien Grosjean	6	4	7
(Zimbabwe) Wayne Black (Zimbabwe) Kevin Ullyett	3	6	5

=== Top half ===
First round
1	(United States) B Bryan (United States) M Bryan	6	6
(Finland) J Nieminen (Thailand) P Srichaphan	1	4
(France) A Clément (France) S Grosjean	4	7	7
(Sweden) S Aspelin (Italy) M Bertolini	6	5	5
(Czech Republic) J Novák (Czech Republic) R Štěpánek	6^{5}	2
(Czech Republic) P Pála (Czech Republic) P Vízner	7^{7}	6
(Argentina) L Arnold (Argentina) A Calleri	7	2	6^{5}
6	(Czech Republic) M Damm (Czech Republic) C Suk	5	6	7^{7}
4	(Australia) W Arthurs (Australia) P Hanley	6	3	6
(Czech Republic) T Cibulec (Czech Republic) L Friedl	3	6	4
(Romania) A Pavel (France) F Santoro	6^{5}	3
WC	(United States) J Blake (United States) M Fish	7^{7}	6
(Chile) F González (Spain) F López	7^{7}	6
(Spain) A Costa (Netherlands) M Verkerk	6^{2}	3
(South Africa) J Coetzee (South Africa) C Haggard	3	2
5	(The Bahamas) M Knowles (Canada) D Nestor	6	6

Second round
1	(United States) B Bryan (United States) M Bryan	4	6^{4}
(France) A Clément (France) S Grosjean	6	7^{7}
(Czech Republic) P Pála (Czech Republic) P Vízner	6	4	3
6	(Czech Republic) M Damm (Czech Republic) C Suk	4	6	6
4	(Australia) W Arthurs (Australia) P Hanley	7^{7}	6
WC	(United States) J Blake (United States) M Fish	6^{4}	2
(Chile) F González (Spain) F López	6^{2}	4
5	(The Bahamas) M Knowles (Canada) D Nestor	7^{7}	6

Quarterfinals
(France) A Clément (France) S Grosjean	7^{7}	6
6	(Czech Republic) M Damm (Czech Republic) C Suk	6^{2}	4
4	(Australia) W Arthurs (Australia) P Hanley	6	5	5
5	(The Bahamas) M Knowles (Canada) D Nestor	3	7	7

Semifinals
(France) A Clément (France) S Grosjean	6	2	6
5	(The Bahamas) M Knowles (Canada) D Nestor	1	6	1

=== Bottom half ===
First round
8	(Argentina) M Hood (Argentina) M Rodríguez	6^{4}	6	6^{3}
(Israel) J Erlich (Israel) A Ram	7^{7}	3	7^{7}
(Zimbabwe) W Black (Zimbabwe) K Ullyett	6	6
(South Africa) R Koenig (The Bahamas) M Merklein	1	2
(Armenia) S Sargsian (Serbia and Montenegro) N Zimonjić	6	6
ALT	(United States) D Bowen (Australia) T Perry	3	3
(Germany) N Kiefer (Germany) R Schüttler	7	1	7
3	(Sweden) J Björkman (Australia) T Woodbridge	5	6	5
7	(India) L Paes (Czech Republic) D Rikl	6^{5}	5
WC	(Switzerland) Y Allegro (Switzerland) R Federer	7^{7}	7
(United States) R Leach (United States) B MacPhie	5	5
(Spain) R Nadal (Spain) T Robredo	7	7
(Poland) M Fyrstenberg (Poland) M Matkowski	4	7^{7}	6^{5}
(Argentina) M García (Argentina) S Prieto	6	6^{5}	7^{7}
(Austria) J Knowle (Germany) M Kohlmann	3	6	1
2	(India) M Bhupathi (Belarus) M Mirnyi	6	3	6

Second round
(Israel) J Erlich (Israel) A Ram	6	4	3
(Zimbabwe) W Black (Zimbabwe) K Ullyett	3	6	6
(Armenia) S Sargsian (Serbia and Montenegro) N Zimonjić	2	3
(Germany) N Kiefer (Germany) R Schüttler	6	6
WC	(Switzerland) Y Allegro (Switzerland) R Federer	7	4	3
(Spain) R Nadal (Spain) T Robredo	5	6	6
(Argentina) M García (Argentina) S Prieto	5	3
2	(India) M Bhupathi (Belarus) M Mirnyi	7	6

Quarterfinals
(Zimbabwe) W Black (Zimbabwe) K Ullyett	6
(Germany) N Kiefer (Germany) R Schüttler	2	r
(Spain) R Nadal (Spain) T Robredo	6^{2}	4
2	(India) M Bhupathi (Belarus) M Mirnyi	7^{7}	6

Semifinals
(Zimbabwe) W Black (Zimbabwe) K Ullyett	6	6
2	(India) M Bhupathi (Belarus) M Mirnyi	4	4
