= 2003 Copa AT&T – Singles =

Singles
- 2003 Copa AT&T

Final
- Champion: (Spain) Carlos Moyá
- Runner-up: (Argentina) Guillermo Coria
- Score: 6–3, 4–6, 6–4

Details
- Draw: 32
- Seeds: 8

Events
Singles	Doubles
← 2002 ·	Copa AT&T	· 2004 →

Nicolás Massú was the defending champion but lost in the first round to Agustín Calleri.

Carlos Moyà won in the final 6–3, 4–6, 6–4 against Guillermo Coria.

== Seeds ==
1. (Spain) Carlos Moyá (champion)
2. (Argentina) David Nalbandian (quarterfinals)
3. (Chile) Fernando González (second round)
4. (Argentina) Gastón Gaudio (semifinals)
5. (Argentina) Juan Ignacio Chela (quarterfinals)
6. (Brazil) Gustavo Kuerten (semifinals)
7. (Ecuador) Nicolás Lapentti (second round)
8. (Argentina) Guillermo Coria (final)

== Draw ==
=== Key ===
- Q = Qualifier
- WC = Wild card
- LL = Lucky loser
- Alt = Alternate
- SE = Special exempt
- PR = Protected ranking
- ITF = ITF entry
- JE = Junior exempt
- w/o = Walkover
- r = Retired
- d = Defaulted
- SR = Special ranking

=== Finals ===
Semifinals
1	(Spain) Carlos Moyá	7^{10}	6
WC/6	(Brazil) Gustavo Kuerten	6^{8}	1
4	(Argentina) Gastón Gaudio	3	6	3
8	(Argentina) Guillermo Coria	6	1	6

Final
1	(Spain) Carlos Moyá	6	4	6
8	(Argentina) Guillermo Coria	3	6	4

=== Top half ===
First round
1	(Spain) C Moyá	6	6
(Spain) D Ferrer	3	3
WC	(Argentina) E Massa	6	6
(Spain) A Martín	4	4
(Peru) L Horna	6	6
Q	(France) É Prodon	3	2
Q	(Italy) A Gaudenzi	4	1
7	(Ecuador) N Lapentti	6	6
3	(Chile) F González	7^{7}	6
(Spain) D Sánchez	6^{4}	3
(Spain) F Mantilla	6	6
(Spain) A Portas	3	1
Q	(Argentina) G Etlis	6^{3}	3
(Brazil) F Saretta	7^{7}	6
LL	(Peru) I Miranda	2	4
WC/6	(Brazil) G Kuerten	6	6

Second round
1	(Spain) C Moyá	6	6
WC	(Argentina) E Massa	2	2
(Peru) L Horna	6	6
7	(Ecuador) N Lapentti	3	4
3	(Chile) F González
(Spain) F Mantilla	w/o
(Brazil) F Saretta	4	7^{7}	5
WC/6	(Brazil) G Kuerten	6	6^{5}	7

Quarterfinals
1	(Spain) C Moyá	6^{4}	6	7
(Peru) L Horna	7^{7}	3	5
(Spain) F Mantilla	2	7^{7}	1
WC/6	(Brazil) G Kuerten	6	6^{4}	6

Semifinals
1	(Spain) C Moyá	7^{10}	6
WC/6	(Brazil) G Kuerten	6^{8}	1

=== Bottom half ===
First round
5	(Argentina) J I Chela	2	6	6
Q	(Argentina) M Charpentier	6	3	1
(Argentina) A Calleri	6	2	6
(Chile) N Massú	4	6	4
(Spain) A Montañés	4	1
(Brazil) F Meligeni	6	6
WC	(Argentina) M Puerta	4	2
4	(Argentina) G Gaudio	6	6
8	(Argentina) G Coria	6	3	6
(Argentina) J Acasuso	3	6	2
(Argentina) M Zabaleta	6	6
(Hungary) A Sávolt	3	4
(Argentina) F Squillari	2	6	6
(Brazil) A Sá	6	3	2
(Spain) F Vicente	3	5
2	(Argentina) D Nalbandian	6	7

Second round
5	(Argentina) J I Chela	7	7
(Argentina) A Calleri	5	5
(Brazil) F Meligeni	6^{4}	6	0
4	(Argentina) G Gaudio	7^{7}	4	6
8	(Argentina) G Coria	6	2	6
(Argentina) M Zabaleta	4	6	3
(Argentina) F Squillari	1	3
2	(Argentina) D Nalbandian	6	6

Quarterfinals
5	(Argentina) J I Chela	3	4
4	(Argentina) G Gaudio	6	6
8	(Argentina) G Coria	3	6	7^{7}
2	(Argentina) D Nalbandian	6	3	6^{5}

Semifinals
4	(Argentina) G Gaudio	3	6	3
8	(Argentina) G Coria	6	1	6
