= Irakli Labadze =

Georgian tennis player

- Country (sports): Georgia
- Residence: Tbilisi, Georgia
- Born: June 9, 1981 (age 43); Tbilisi, Georgian SSR
- Height: 1.88 m (6 ft 2 in)
- Turned pro: 1998
- Retired: 2010
- Plays: Left-handed (two-handed backhand)
- Prize money: US$1,234,668

Singles
- Career record: 50–83
- Career titles: 0
- Highest ranking: No. 42 (5 July 2004)

Grand Slam singles results
- Australian Open: 1R (2002, 2003, 2004, 2005)
- French Open: 2R (2002, 2004)
- Wimbledon: 4R (2006)
- US Open: 1R (2002, 2004)

Doubles
- Career record: 27–34
- Career titles: 0
- Highest ranking: No. 100 (29 October 2001)

Grand Slam doubles results
- Australian Open: 2R (2005)
- French Open: 1R (2004)
- Wimbledon: 3R (2006)
- US Open: 1R (2004)

Grand Slam mixed doubles results
- Wimbledon: 1R (2004)
- Last updated on: January 25, 2022.

Irakli Labadze (Georgian: ირაკლი ლაბაძე, romanized: irak'li labadze, pronounced [iɾakʼli labad͡ze]; born June 9, 1981) is a Georgian retired professional tennis player. His career-high singles ranking was World No. 42, which he attained in July 2004. He was the first Georgian player to reach the fourth round at Wimbledon as a qualifier.

== Career ==
=== Juniors ===
Labadze had a successful junior career, notably reaching the final of the Wimbledon boys' singles in 1998 and losing to future World No.1 Roger Federer. Together with Lovro Zovko he won the 1999 French Open boys' doubles.

=== Pro tour ===
Labadze's most successful appearance at a Grand Slam event came at the 2006 Wimbledon Championships, where he reached the fourth round. After eliminating Gastón Gaudio and Mardy Fish, he was defeated by the eventual runner-up Rafael Nadal in three sets. It was to be his last appearance in the singles main draw at a major championship.

Labadze's best result in Masters 1000 tournaments was reaching the semifinals of the 2004 Indian Wells Masters. After defeating Carlos Moyá and James Blake, he lost to Tim Henman in straight sets.

== Junior Grand Slam finals ==
=== Singles: 1 (1 runner-up) ===
Result	Year	Tournament	Surface	Opponent	Score
Loss	1998	Wimbledon	Grass	(Switzerland) Roger Federer	4–6, 4–6

=== Doubles: 1 (1 title) ===
Result	Year	Tournament	Surface	Partner	Opponents	Score
Win	1999	French Open	Clay	(Croatia) Lovro Zovko	(Denmark) Kristian Pless (Belgium) Olivier Rochus	6–1, 7–6

== ATP career finals ==
=== Doubles: 3 (3 runner-ups) ===
Legend Grand Slam Tournaments (0–0) ATP World Tour Finals (0–0) ATP Masters Series (0–0) ATP Championship Series (0–0) ATP World Series (0–3)	Finals by surface Hard (0–2) Clay (0–1) Grass (0–0) Carpet (0–0)	Finals by setting Outdoors (0–1) Indoors (0–2)

Result	W–L	Date	Tournament	Tier	Surface	Partner	Opponents	Score
Loss	0–1	Jul 2001	Sopot, Poland	International Series	Clay	(Hungary) Attila Sávolt	(Australia) Paul Hanley (Australia) Nathan Healey	6–7^{(10–12)}, 2–6
Loss	0–2	Oct 2001	St. Petersburg, Russia	International Series	Hard	(Russia) Marat Safin	(Russia) Denis Golovanov (Russia) Yevgeny Kafelnikov	5–7, 4–6
Loss	0–3	Oct 2002	St. Petersburg, Russia	International Series	Hard	(Russia) Marat Safin	(South Africa) David Adams (United States) Jared Palmer	6–7^{(8–10)}, 3–6

== ATP Challenger and ITF Futures finals ==
=== Singles: 18 (10–8) ===
Legend ATP Challenger (9–4) ITF Futures (1–4)	Finals by surface Hard (4–4) Clay (6–4) Grass (0–0) Carpet (0–0)

Result	W–L	Date	Tournament	Tier	Surface	Opponent	Score
Loss	0-1	Jan 1999	USA F1, Altamonte Springs	Futures	Hard	(United States) James Blake	2–6, 2–6
Loss	0-2	Mar 1999	Philippines F2, Manila	Futures	Hard	(Sweden) Jan Hermansson	6–1, 4–6, 1–6
Loss	0-3	May 1999	USA F4, Vero Beach	Futures	Clay	(United States) Michael Russell	6–7, 3–6
Loss	0-4	Oct 1999	Mexico F6, Chihuahua	Futures	Hard	(Greece) Solon Peppas	4–6, 4–6
Win	1-4	Jan 2000	USA F3, Boca Raton	Futures	Hard	(Brazil) Marcos Daniel	6–4, 6–4
Win	2-4	Jun 2000	Fürth, Germany	Challenger	Clay	(Germany) Daniel Elsner	6–4, 6–4
Win	3-4	May 2001	Birmingham, United States	Challenger	Clay	(United States) James Blake	6–2, 6–3
Win	4-4	Jun 2001	Bucharest, Romania	Challenger	Clay	(Spain) Emilio Benfele Álvarez	6–4, 6–2
Loss	4-5	Jul 2001	Ulm, Germany	Challenger	Clay	(Russia) Nikolay Davydenko	6–4, 6–7^{(2–7)}, 5–7
Loss	4-6	Aug 2001	Manerbio, Italy	Challenger	Clay	(Hungary) Attila Sávolt	5–7, 2–6
Win	5-6	Feb 2002	Brest, France	Challenger	Hard	(Thailand) Paradorn Srichaphan	6–4, 7–5
Win	6-6	Sep 2002	Kyiv, Ukraine	Challenger	Clay	(Spain) Gorka Fraile	6–0, 4–6, 6–4
Loss	6-7	Oct 2002	Grenoble, France	Challenger	Hard	(France) Michaël Llodra	4–6, 3–6
Loss	6-8	Aug 2003	Mönchengladbach, Germany	Challenger	Clay	(Germany) Daniel Elsner	1–6, 6–2, 3–6
Win	7-8	Sep 2003	Kyiv, Ukraine	Challenger	Clay	(Czech Republic) Petr Kralert	6–1, 6–2
Win	8-8	Sep 2003	Saint-Jean-de-Luz, France	Challenger	Hard	(France) Fabrice Santoro	1–6, 7–6^{(7–4)}, 6–4
Win	9-8	Nov 2003	Dnipropetrovsk, Ukraine	Challenger	Hard	(Israel) Harel Levy	6–3, 3–6, 6–1
Win	10-8	Jul 2005	Biella, Italy	Challenger	Clay	(Argentina) Carlos Berlocq	7–6^{(7–4)}, 6–0

=== Doubles: 14 (6–8) ===
Legend ATP Challenger (5–5) ITF Futures (1–3)	Finals by surface Hard (0–4) Clay (6–3) Grass (0–0) Carpet (0–1)

Result	W–L	Date	Tournament	Tier	Surface	Partner	Opponents	Score
Loss	0–1	Mar 1999	Philippines F1, Manila	Futures	Hard	(Russia) Dmitry Tursunov	(Germany) Marcus Hilpert (United States) Andrew Rueb	4–6, 6–7
Win	1–1	May 1999	USA F4, Vero Beach	Futures	Clay	(Croatia) Lovro Zovko	(United States) Hugo Armando (United States) Mitch Sprengelmeyer	7–6, 7–6
Loss	1–2	Oct 1999	Mexico F5, Playa del Carmen	Futures	Hard	(United States) Diego Ayala	(Brazil) Flávio Saretta (Brazil) Leonardo Silva	5–7, 6–7
Loss	1–3	Jan 2000	USA F1, Pembroke Pines	Futures	Hard	(United States) Rafael De Mesa	(South Africa) Gareth Williams (United States) Jeff Williams	4–6, 1–6
Loss	1–4	Feb 2000	Ho Chi Minh City, Vietnam	Challenger	Hard	(South Africa) Kevin Ullyett	(Australia) Michael Hill (Australia) Todd Woodbridge	3–6, 4–6
Loss	1–5	May 2000	Budapest, Hungary	Challenger	Clay	(Romania) Dinu-Mihai Pescariu	(Japan) Thomas Shimada (South Africa) Myles Wakefield	2–6, 6–3, 3–6
Win	2–5	Nov 2000	Quito, Ecuador	Challenger	Clay	(Brazil) Francisco Costa	(United States) Eric Nunez (Argentina) Martin Stringari	6–2, 7–6^{(7–4)}
Win	3–5	Nov 2000	Santiago, Chile	Challenger	Clay	(Socialist Federal Republic of Yugoslavia) Dušan Vemić	(Spain) Joan Balcells (Spain) Germán Puentes Alcañiz	6–3, 6–4
Loss	3–6	Sep 2002	Kyiv, Ukraine	Challenger	Clay	(Russia) Yuri Schukin	(Argentina) Federico Browne (Netherlands) Fred Hemmes	4–6, 3–6
Win	4–6	Aug 2003	Mönchengladbach, Germany	Challenger	Clay	(Netherlands) Rogier Wassen	(Germany) Karsten Braasch (Germany) Franz Stauder	6–7^{(4–7)}, 6–2, 6–2
Win	5–6	Jun 2005	Reggio Emilia, Italy	Challenger	Clay	(Russia) Yuri Schukin	(Italy) Francesco Aldi (Italy) Tomas Tenconi	6–4, 6–3
Loss	5–7	Aug 2005	Trani, Italy	Challenger	Clay	(Italy) Giorgio Galimberti	(Argentina) Carlos Berlocq (Argentina) Cristian Villagrán	6–4, 2–6, 4–6
Loss	5–8	Nov 2006	Aachen, Germany	Challenger	Carpet	(Poland) Tomasz Bednarek	(Latvia) Ernests Gulbis (Germany) Mischa Zverev	7–6^{(7–5)}, 4–6, [8–10]
Win	6–8	Aug 2008	Samarkand, Uzbekistan	Challenger	Clay	(Russia) Denis Matsukevich	(Russia) Danila Arsenov (Uzbekistan) Vaja Uzakov	7–6^{(7–1)}, 4–6, [10–3]

== Performance timeline ==
Key
W	F	SF	QF	#R	RR	Q#	DNQ	A	NH

(W) winner; (F) finalist; (SF) semifinalist; (QF) quarterfinalist; (#R) rounds 4, 3, 2, 1; (RR) round-robin stage; (Q#) qualification round; (DNQ) did not qualify; (A) absent; (NH) not held; (SR) strike rate (events won / competed); (W–L) win–loss record.

=== Singles ===
Tournament	1999	2000	2001	2002	2003	2004	2005	2006	2007	2008	SR	W–L	Win%
Grand Slam tournaments
Australian Open	A	A	Q1	1R	1R	1R	1R	A	A	A	0 / 4	0–4	0%
French Open	A	A	Q2	2R	1R	2R	Q2	Q1	A	A	0 / 3	2–3	40%
Wimbledon	Q1	Q2	Q2	2R	1R	2R	Q2	4R	A	Q1	0 / 4	5–4	56%
US Open	A	Q1	A	1R	A	1R	A	A	A	A	0 / 2	0–2	0%
Win–loss	0–0	0–0	0–0	2–4	0–3	2–4	0–1	3–1	0–0	0–0	0 / 13	7–13	35%
ATP World Tour Masters 1000
Indian Wells	A	A	A	A	A	SF	1R	A	A	A	0 / 2	5–2	71%
Miami	A	A	A	1R	Q2	1R	2R	A	A	A	0 / 3	1–3	25%
Monte Carlo	A	A	A	Q1	A	A	A	A	A	A	0 / 0	0–0	–
Hamburg	A	A	A	A	Q2	2R	A	A	A	A	0 / 1	1–1	50%
Rome	A	A	A	Q1	Q2	2R	A	A	A	A	0 / 1	1–1	50%
Madrid	Not Held			A	A	1R	A	A	A	A	0 / 1	0–1	0%
Canada	A	A	A	A	A	1R	A	A	A	A	0 / 1	0–1	0%
Cincinnati	A	A	A	A	A	1R	A	A	A	A	0 / 1	0–1	0%
Paris	A	A	A	A	Q1	A	A	A	A	A	0 / 0	0–0	–
Win–loss	0–0	0–0	0–0	0–1	0–0	7–7	1–2	0–0	0–0	0–0	0 / 10	8–10	44%
