= 2004 Hamburg Masters – Doubles =

Doubles
- 2004 Hamburg Masters

Final
- Champions: (Zimbabwe) Wayne Black (Zimbabwe) Kevin Ullyett
- Runners-up: (United States) Bob Bryan (United States) Mike Bryan
- Score: 6–4, 6–2

Details
- Draw: 24 (2WC)
- Seeds: 8

Events
Singles	Doubles
- Hamburg Masters

Mark Knowles and Daniel Nestor were the defending champions, but lost in Quarterfinals to Wayne Black and Kevin Ullyett.

Black and Ullyett won the title, defeating Bob and Mike Bryan in the final 6–4, 6–2.

== Seeds ==
All seeds received a bye into the second round.

1. (United States) Bob Bryan / (United States) Mike Bryan (final)
2. (Sweden) Jonas Björkman / (Australia) Todd Woodbridge (semifinals)
3. (India) Mahesh Bhupathi / (Belarus) Max Mirnyi (second round)
4. (The Bahamas) Mark Knowles / (Canada) Daniel Nestor (quarterfinals)
5. (Australia) Wayne Arthurs / (Australia) Paul Hanley (quarterfinals)
6. (Czech Republic) Martin Damm / (Czech Republic) Cyril Suk (second round)
7. (Zimbabwe) Wayne Black / (Zimbabwe) Kevin Ullyett (champions)
8. (Argentina) Gastón Etlis / (Argentina) Martín Rodríguez (second round)

== Draw ==
Key

- Q = Qualifier
- WC = Wild card
- LL = Lucky loser
- Alt = Alternate
- ITF = ITF entry
- PR = Protected ranking
- SR = Special ranking
- SE = Special exempt
- JE = Junior exempt
- JR = Junior Accelerator Programme entrant
- CO = College Accelerator Programme entrant
- NG = Next Gen Accelerator Program entrant
- w/o = Walkover
- r = Retired
- d = Defaulted

=== Finals ===
Semifinals
1	(United States) Bob Bryan (United States) Mike Bryan	7^{7}	6
(India) Leander Paes (Czech Republic) David Rikl	6^{4}	3
7	(Zimbabwe) Wayne Black (Zimbabwe) Kevin Ullyett	6	6
2	(Sweden) Jonas Björkman (Australia) Todd Woodbridge	2	1

Final
1	(United States) Bob Bryan (United States) Mike Bryan	4	2
7	(Zimbabwe) Wayne Black (Zimbabwe) Kevin Ullyett	6	6

=== Top half ===
First round
(Israel) J Erlich (Israel) A Ram	3	6	4
(South Africa) J Coetzee (South Africa) C Haggard	6	3	6
WC	(Germany) M Kohlmann (Germany) A Waske	6^{4}	6	6
(United States) J Palmer (Czech Republic) P Vízner	7^{7}	2	4
(India) L Paes (Czech Republic) D Rikl	7	7^{7}
(France) A Clément (France) S Grosjean	5	6^{1}
(Argentina) M Hood (Argentina) S Prieto	6	6
(Slovakia) D Hrbatý (Thailand) P Srichaphan	2	2

Second round
1	(United States) B Bryan (United States) M Bryan	6	6
(South Africa) J Coetzee (South Africa) C Haggard	0	3
WC	(Germany) M Kohlmann (Germany) A Waske	6	1	7
6	(Czech Republic) M Damm (Czech Republic) C Suk	3	6	5
3	(India) M Bhupathi (Belarus) M Mirnyi	6	4	4
(India) L Paes (Czech Republic) D Rikl	4	6	6
(Argentina) M Hood (Argentina) S Prieto	3	6	6^{3}
5	(Australia) W Arthurs (Australia) P Hanley	6	4	7^{7}

Quarterfinals
1	(United States) B Bryan (United States) M Bryan	6	6
WC	(Germany) M Kohlmann (Germany) A Waske	3	2
(India) L Paes (Czech Republic) D Rikl	6	6
5	(Australia) W Arthurs (Australia) P Hanley	3	2

Semifinals
1	(United States) B Bryan (United States) M Bryan	7^{7}	6
(India) L Paes (Czech Republic) D Rikl	6^{4}	3

=== Bottom half ===
First round
(Austria) J Knowle (Serbia and Montenegro) N Zimonjić	4	6	6
WC	(Germany) K Braasch (Germany) L Burgsmüller	6	3	3
(Germany) N Kiefer (Germany) R Schüttler	4	6	7
(Czech Republic) J Novák (Czech Republic) P Pála	6	0	5
(Argentina) G Cañas (Argentina) JI Chela	6	7^{7}
(Czech Republic) F Čermák (Czech Republic) L Friedl	4	6^{1}
(Chile) N Massú (Romania) A Pavel	6	3	6
(Argentina) L Arnold (Armenia) S Sargsian	3	6	2

Second round
7	(Zimbabwe) W Black (Zimbabwe) K Ullyett	6	6
(Austria) J Knowle (Serbia and Montenegro) N Zimonjić	4	3
(Germany) N Kiefer (Germany) R Schüttler	3	1
4	(The Bahamas) M Knowles (Canada) D Nestor	6	6
8	(Argentina) G Etlis (Argentina) M Rodríguez	1	2
(Argentina) G Cañas (Argentina) JI Chela	6	6
(Chile) N Massú (Romania) A Pavel
2	(Sweden) J Björkman (Australia) T Woodbridge	w/o

Quarterfinals
7	(Zimbabwe) W Black (Zimbabwe) K Ullyett	6	6^{7}	7^{7}
4	(The Bahamas) M Knowles (Canada) D Nestor	2	7^{9}	6^{5}
(Argentina) G Cañas (Argentina) JI Chela	3	5
2	(Sweden) J Björkman (Australia) T Woodbridge	6	7

Semifinals
7	(Zimbabwe) W Black (Zimbabwe) K Ullyett	6	6
2	(Sweden) J Björkman (Australia) T Woodbridge	2	1
