= Mariano Hood =

Argentine tennis player

- Country (sports): Argentina
- Residence: Buenos Aires, Argentina
- Born: 14 August 1973 (age 52); Buenos Aires, Argentina
- Height: 1.78 m (5 ft 10 in)
- Turned pro: 1993
- Retired: 2009
- Plays: Left-handed
- Coach: Daniel Orsanic
- Prize money: US$847,665

Singles
- Career record: 4–7
- Career titles: 0; 0 Challenger, 0 Futures
- Highest ranking: No. 153 (15 May 2000)

Grand Slam singles results
- Australian Open: Q2 (1999)
- French Open: Q1 (2000)
- Wimbledon: Q2 (2000)
- US Open: Q2 (1999)

Doubles
- Career record: 170–149
- Career titles: 13; 22 Challenger, 0 Futures
- Highest ranking: No. 20 (27 October 2003)

Grand Slam doubles results
- Australian Open: 2R (2002, 2005)
- French Open: QF (2003, 2005)
- Wimbledon: 2R (2004, 2005)
- US Open: 3R (2003)

Mariano Hood (born 14 August 1973) is a retired left-handed professional Argentine tennis player who specialized in doubles.

In his career, Hood won 13 out of the 26 top level doubles finals he was in. He turned professional in 1993, and currently resides in his city of birth, Buenos Aires. He won US$806,888 in earnings and was coached by Daniel Orsanic. He won his first doubles title in Santiago, Chile, in 1998 and Palermo in 2005 was his last title. On October 27, 2003, Hood reached his highest doubles ranking of World Number 20. He partnered either Sebastián Prieto or Lucas Arnold Ker to win most of his doubles titles, although he did have other partnerships as well.

Hood was banned by the ITF of the illegal use of Finasteride after he had made the French Open quarterfinals in 2005. He thus planned to retire from the professional circuit. However, Hood made a comeback in 2008. He last played on the tour in 2009.

== 2008 comeback ==
In his first tournament of the year, he went to the semifinals with José Acasuso at the 2008 Copa Telmex. A week later, Hood teamed with Eduardo Schwank to win the Santiago, Chile, Challenger on the ITF Men's Circuit. After two weeks' early losses alongside fellow Argentine partners in Challenger tournaments, he teamed with Guillermo Coria to reach the Naples Challenger semifinals, and then with Luis Horna to reach the Monza Challenger semifinals. Directly after this, he won a second title, at Chiasso located in Switzerland with Alberto Martín in a Challenger event. Two weeks later, a third Challenger triumph arrived with a victory over Marc Fornell and Caio Zampieri alongside Guillermo García López. After a few more tournaments, he received a wildcard entry with Rafael Nadal at the 2008 Queen's Club Championships.

== ATP career finals ==
=== Doubles: 26 (13 titles, 13 runner-ups) ===
Legend Grand Slam Tournaments (0–0) ATP World Tour Finals (0–0) ATP Masters Series (0–0) ATP Championship Series (0–1) ATP World Series (13–12)	Finals by surface Hard (0–0) Clay (13–11) Grass (0–0) Carpet (0–2)	Finals by setting Outdoors (13–11) Indoors (0–2)

Result	W/L	Date	Tournament	Surface	Partner	Opponents	Score
Loss	0–1	Aug 1996	San Marino, San Marino	Clay	(Argentina) Sebastián Prieto	(Argentina) Pablo Albano (Argentina) Lucas Arnold Ker	1–6, 3–6
Loss	0–2	Aug 1998	San Marino, San Marino	Clay	(Argentina) Sebastián Prieto	(Czech Republic) Jiří Novák (Czech Republic) David Rikl	4–6, 6–7
Win	1–2	Nov 1998	Santiago, Chile	Clay	(Argentina) Sebastián Prieto	(Italy) Massimo Bertolini (United States) Devin Bowen	7–6, 6–7, 7–6
Win	2–2	Aug 1999	San Marino, San Marino	Clay	(Argentina) Lucas Arnold Ker	(Czech Republic) Petr Pála (Czech Republic) Pavel Vízner	6–3, 6–2
Win	3–2	Oct 1999	Palermo, Italy	Clay	(Argentina) Sebastián Prieto	(South Africa) Lan Bale (Spain) Alberto Martín	6–3, 6–1
Loss	3–3	Sep 2000	Bucharest, Romania	Clay	(United States) Devin Bowen	(Spain) Alberto Martín (Israel) Eyal Ran	6–7, 1–6
Win	4–3	Feb 2001	Bogotá, Colombia	Clay	(Argentina) Sebastián Prieto	(Argentina) Martín Rodríguez (Brazil) André Sá	6–2, 6–4
Loss	4–4	Feb 2001	Viña del Mar, Chile	Clay	(Argentina) Sebastián Prieto	(Spain) Tomás Carbonell (Argentina) Lucas Arnold Ker	4–6, 6–2, 3–6
Loss	4–5	Feb 2001	Buenos Aires, Argentina	Clay	(Argentina) Sebastián Prieto	(Spain) Tomás Carbonell (Argentina) Lucas Arnold Ker	7–5, 5–7, 6–7^{(5–7)}
Win	5–5	Feb 2003	Viña del Mar, Chile	Clay	(Argentina) Agustín Calleri	(Czech Republic) František Čermák (Czech Republic) Leoš Friedl	6–3, 1–6, 6–4
Win	6–5	Feb 2003	Buenos Aires, Argentina	Clay	(Argentina) Sebastián Prieto	(Argentina) Lucas Arnold Ker (Argentina) David Nalbandian	6–2, 6–2
Loss	6–6	Apr 2003	Estoril, Portugal	Clay	(Argentina) Lucas Arnold Ker	(India) Mahesh Bhupathi (Belarus) Max Mirnyi	1–6, 2–6
Win	7–6	May 2003	Valencia, Spain	Clay	(Argentina) Lucas Arnold Ker	(United States) Brian MacPhie (Serbia and Montenegro) Nenad Zimonjić	6–1, 6–7^{(7–9)}, 6-4
Loss	7–7	Jul 2003	Båstad, Sweden	Clay	(Argentina) Lucas Arnold Ker	(Sweden) Simon Aspelin (Italy) Massimo Bertolini	7–6, 0–6, 4–6
Win	8–7	Sep 2003	Palermo, Italy	Clay	(Argentina) Lucas Arnold Ker	(Czech Republic) František Čermák (Czech Republic) Leoš Friedl	7-6^{(8–6)}, 6–7^{(3–7)}, 6–3
Loss	8–8	Oct 2003	Basel, Switzerland	Carpet (i)	(Argentina) Lucas Arnold Ker	(The Bahamas) Mark Knowles (Canada) Daniel Nestor	4–6, 2–6
Win	9–8	Feb 2004	Buenos Aires, Argentina	Clay	(Argentina) Lucas Arnold Ker	(Argentina) Federico Browne (Argentina) Diego Veronelli	7–5, 6–7^{(2–7)}, 6–4
Loss	9–9	May 2004	Barcelona, Spain	Clay	(Argentina) Sebastián Prieto	(The Bahamas) Mark Knowles (Canada) Daniel Nestor	6–4, 3–6, 4–6
Win	10–9	May 2004	St. Poelten, Austria	Clay	(Czech Republic) Petr Pála	(Czech Republic) Tomáš Cibulec (Czech Republic) Leoš Friedl	3–6, 7–5, 6–4
Win	11–9	Sep 2004	Bucharest, Romania	Clay	(Argentina) Lucas Arnold Ker	(Argentina) José Acasuso (Spain) Óscar Hernández	7–6^{(7–5)}, 6–1
Win	12–9	Oct 2004	Palermo, Italy	Clay	(Argentina) Lucas Arnold Ker	(Argentina) Gastón Etlis (Argentina) Martín Rodríguez	7–5, 6–2
Loss	12–10	Oct 2004	Basel, Switzerland	Carpet (i)	(Argentina) Lucas Arnold Ker	(United States) Bob Bryan (United States) Mike Bryan	6–7, 2–6
Loss	12–11	Apr 2005	Valencia, Spain	Clay	(Argentina) Lucas Arnold Ker	(Chile) Fernando González (Argentina) Martín Rodríguez	4–6, 4–6
Loss	12–12	May 2005	Sankt Pölten, Austria	Clay	(Czech Republic) Martin Damm	(Australia) Paul Hanley (Argentina) Lucas Arnold Ker	3–6, 4–6
Loss	12–13	Jul 2005	Stuttgart, Germany	Clay	(Spain) Tommy Robredo	(Argentina) José Acasuso (Argentina) Sebastián Prieto	6–7^{(4–7)}, 3–6
Win	13–13	Oct 2005	Palermo, Italy	Clay	(Argentina) Martín García	(Poland) Mariusz Fyrstenberg (Poland) Marcin Matkowski	6–2, 6–3

== ATP Challenger and ITF Futures finals ==
=== Singles: 2 (0–2) ===
Legend ATP Challenger (0–2) ITF Futures (0–0)	Finals by surface Hard (0–0) Clay (0–2) Grass (0–0) Carpet (0–0)

Result	W–L	Date	Tournament	Tier	Surface	Opponent	Score
Loss	0–1	Jun 1999	Maia, Portugal	Challenger	Clay	(Spain) Juan Carlos Ferrero	3–6, 7–5, 3–6
Loss	0–2	Apr 2000	San Luis Potosí, Mexico	Challenger	Clay	(Argentina) Agustín Calleri	5–7, 4–6

=== Doubles: 38 (22–16) ===
Legend ATP Challenger (22–16) ITF Futures (0–0)	Finals by surface Hard (1–2) Clay (21–14) Grass (0–0) Carpet (0–0)

Result	W–L	Date	Tournament	Tier	Surface	Partner	Opponents	Score
Loss	0–1	Sep 1996	Brașov, Romania	Challenger	Clay	(Argentina) Martín Rodríguez	(Romania) Gheorghe Cosac (Romania) Dinu-Mihai Pescariu	6–7, 1–6
Win	1–1	Aug 1997	Merano, Italy	Challenger	Clay	(Argentina) Sebastián Prieto	(Italy) Cristian Brandi (Italy) Filippo Messori	6–1, 4–6, 7–6
Win	2–1	Aug 1997	Santa Cruz, Bolivia	Challenger	Clay	(Argentina) Sebastián Prieto	(Brazil) Egberto Caldas (Brazil) Adriano Ferreira	7–6, 4–6, 6–3
Win	3–1	Oct 1997	Lima, Peru	Challenger	Clay	(Argentina) Sebastián Prieto	(Belgium) Kris Goossens (Venezuela) Jimy Szymanski	6–2, 6–1
Loss	3–2	Nov 1997	Palmar, Puerto Rico	Challenger	Clay	(Argentina) Sebastián Prieto	(Argentina) Lucas Arnold Ker (Argentina) Daniel Orsanic	5–7, 6–3, 3–6
Win	4–2	Dec 1997	Santiago, Chile	Challenger	Clay	(Argentina) Sebastián Prieto	(Argentina) Diego del Río (Argentina) Mariano Puerta	7–5, 6–1
Loss	4–3	Mar 1998	Salinas, Ecuador	Challenger	Hard	(Argentina) Sebastián Prieto	(United States) David DiLucia (United States) Michael Sell	6–7, 4–6
Win	5–3	Apr 1998	Nice, France	Challenger	Clay	(United States) Devin Bowen	(Brazil) André Sá (Argentina) Mariano Puerta	7–5, 3–6, 6–4
Win	6–3	Mar 1999	Salinas, Ecuador	Challenger	Hard	(Argentina) Sebastián Prieto	(Argentina) Lucas Arnold Ker (Argentina) Daniel Orsanic	6–2, 7–6
Win	7–3	Jun 1999	Maia, Portugal	Challenger	Clay	(Argentina) Sebastián Prieto	(Portugal) Emanuel Couto (Portugal) Bernardo Mota	6–2, 6–0
Loss	7–4	Jul 1999	Venice, Italy	Challenger	Clay	(Argentina) Diego del Río	(Spain) Albert Portas (Spain) Germán Puentes Alcañiz	4–6, 0–6
Loss	7–5	Oct 1999	São Paulo, Brazil	Challenger	Clay	(Argentina) Sebastián Prieto	(Brazil) Jaime Oncins (Argentina) Daniel Orsanic	2–6, 2–6
Loss	7–6	Oct 1999	Lima, Peru	Challenger	Clay	(Argentina) Sebastián Prieto	(Argentina) Pablo Albano (Argentina) Martín García	6–7, 6–3, 3–6
Loss	7–7	Jun 2000	Szczecin, Poland	Challenger	Clay	(Argentina) Martín Rodríguez	(Spain) Alberto Martín (Israel) Eyal Ran	6–7^{(2–7)}, 7–6^{(7–5)}, 2–6
Win	8–7	Oct 2000	São Paulo, Brazil	Challenger	Clay	(Argentina) Sebastián Prieto	(Germany) Tomas Behrend (Spain) Germán Puentes Alcañiz	6–3, 7–6^{(8–6)}
Loss	8–8	Jun 2001	Prostějov, Czech Republic	Challenger	Clay	(United States) Devin Bowen	(Italy) Andrea Gaudenzi (Netherlands) Sander Groen	6–7^{(6–8)}, 4–6
Loss	8–9	Oct 2001	São Paulo, Brazil	Challenger	Clay	(Argentina) Diego del Río	(Argentina) Agustín Calleri (Argentina) Edgardo Massa	7–5, 5–7, 3–6
Win	9–9	Nov 2001	Montevideo, Uruguay	Challenger	Clay	(Argentina) Gastón Etlis	(Argentina) Diego del Río (Argentina) Martín Vassallo Argüello	walkover
Win	10–9	May 2002	Ljubljana, Slovenia	Challenger	Clay	(Argentina) Edgardo Massa	(Peru) Luis Horna (Argentina) Sebastián Prieto	7–5, 6–1
Loss	10–10	May 2002	Budapest, Hungary	Challenger	Clay	(Argentina) Sebastián Prieto	(Slovakia) Karol Beck (Czech Republic) Jaroslav Levinský	6–3, 4–6, 1–6
Loss	10–11	Jun 2002	Prostějov, Czech Republic	Challenger	Clay	(Argentina) Sebastián Prieto	(Czech Republic) František Čermák (Czech Republic) Ota Fukárek	3–6, 6–7^{(5–7)}
Win	11–11	Jun 2002	Braunschweig, Germany	Challenger	Clay	(Peru) Luis Horna	(Czech Republic) Petr Luxa (Czech Republic) František Čermák	3–6, 6–3, 6–1
Loss	11–12	Jul 2002	Scheveningen, Netherlands	Challenger	Clay	(Argentina) Sebastián Prieto	(Netherlands) Edwin Kempes (Netherlands) Martin Verkerk	4–6, 4–6
Win	12–12	Oct 2002	Seville, Spain	Challenger	Clay	(Peru) Luis Horna	(Spain) Álex López Morón (Spain) Albert Portas	4–6, 6–1, 6–4
Win	13–12	Oct 2002	Barcelona, Spain	Challenger	Clay	(Spain) Emilio Benfele Álvarez	(Germany) Karsten Braasch (Sweden) Peter Nyborg	7–5, 6–3
Win	14–12	Nov 2002	São Paulo, Brazil	Challenger	Clay	(Argentina) Sebastián Prieto	(Peru) Luis Horna (Argentina) Sergio Roitman	6–3, 6–4
Win	15–12	May 2003	Zagreb, Croatia	Challenger	Clay	(Argentina) Lucas Arnold Ker	(Sweden) Simon Aspelin (Australia) Todd Perry	6–1, 6–3
Win	16–12	Jul 2003	Košice, Slovakia	Challenger	Clay	(Argentina) Lucas Arnold Ker	(Spain) Salvador Navarro-Gutierrez (Spain) Rubén Ramírez Hidalgo	2–1 ret.
Win	17–12	Jun 2004	Szczecin, Poland	Challenger	Clay	(Argentina) Lucas Arnold Ker	(Spain) Alberto Martín (Spain) Óscar Hernández	6–0, 6–4
Win	18–12	Mar 2008	Santiago, Chile	Challenger	Clay	(Argentina) Eduardo Schwank	(Argentina) Brian Dabul (Netherlands Antilles) Jean-Julien Rojer	6–3, 6–3
Win	19–12	Apr 2008	Chiasso, Switzerland	Challenger	Clay	(Spain) Alberto Martín	(Italy) Fabio Colangelo (Italy) Marco Crugnola	4–6, 7–6^{(7–4)}, [11–9]
Win	20–12	May 2008	Rabat, Morocco	Challenger	Clay	(Spain) Guillermo García López	(Spain) Marc Fornell Mestres (Brazil) Caio Zampieri	6–3, 6–2
Loss	20–13	Jun 2008	Reggio Emilia, Italy	Challenger	Clay	(Argentina) Leonardo Mayer	(China) Yu Xinyuan (China) Zeng Shaoxuan	3–6, 4–6
Loss	20–14	Jul 2008	Lugano, Switzerland	Challenger	Clay	(Argentina) Eduardo Schwank	(Australia) Rameez Junaid (Germany) Philipp Marx	6–7^{(7–9)}, 6–4, [7–10]
Win	21–14	Aug 2008	Como, Italy	Challenger	Clay	(Spain) Alberto Martín	(Chile) Guillermo Hormazábal (Croatia) Antonio Veić	6–1, 6–4
Win	22–14	Sep 2008	Ljubljana, Slovenia	Challenger	Clay	(Argentina) Juan Pablo Brzezicki	(Australia) Rameez Junaid (Germany) Philipp Marx	7–5, 7–6^{(7–4)}
Loss	22–15	Oct 2008	Asunción, Paraguay	Challenger	Clay	(Argentina) Martín García	(Argentina) Leonardo Mayer (Argentina) Alejandro Fabbri	5–7, 4–6
Loss	22–16	Jan 2009	São Paulo, Brazil	Challenger	Hard	(Argentina) Horacio Zeballos	(Argentina) Leonardo Mayer (Argentina) Carlos Berlocq	6–7^{(1–7)}, 3–6

== Performance timeline ==
Key
W	F	SF	QF	#R	RR	Q#	P#	DNQ	A	Z#	PO	G	S	B	NMS	NTI	P	NH

(W) winner; (F) finalist; (SF) semifinalist; (QF) quarterfinalist; (#R) rounds 4, 3, 2, 1; (RR) round-robin stage; (Q#) qualification round; (P#) preliminary round; (DNQ) did not qualify; (A) absent; (Z#) Davis/Fed Cup Zonal Group (with number indication) or (PO) play-off; (G) gold, (S) silver or (B) bronze Olympic/Paralympic medal; (NMS) not a Masters tournament; (NTI) not a Tier I tournament; (P) postponed; (NH) not held; (SR) strike rate (events won / competed); (W–L) win–loss record.

=== Doubles ===
Tournament	1998	1999	2000	2001	2002	2003	2004	2005	2006	2007	2008	2009	SR	W–L	Win%
Grand Slam tournaments
Australian Open	A	1R	1R	1R	2R	1R	1R	2R	A	A	A	1R	0 / 8	2–8	20%
French Open	3R	3R	1R	1R	3R	QF	2R	QF	A	A	A	A	0 / 8	13–8	62%
Wimbledon	1R	1R	1R	1R	1R	1R	2R	2R	A	A	A	A	0 / 8	2–8	20%
US Open	1R	2R	2R	1R	1R	3R	2R	1R	A	A	A	A	0 / 8	5–8	38%
Win–loss	2–3	3–4	1–4	0–4	3–4	5–4	3–4	5–4	0–0	0–0	0–0	0–1	0 / 32	22–32	41%
ATP Tour Masters 1000
Indian Wells	A	A	A	A	A	A	1R	A	A	A	A	A	0 / 1	0–1	0%
Miami	3R	1R	2R	1R	A	1R	2R	2R	A	A	A	A	0 / 7	5–7	42%
Monte Carlo	A	A	A	Q2	A	A	1R	2R	A	A	A	A	0 / 2	1–2	33%
Rome	A	A	A	2R	A	2R	1R	1R	A	A	A	A	0 / 4	2–4	33%
Hamburg	A	A	A	Q1	A	A	2R	2R	A	A	A	NMS	0 / 2	2–2	50%
Madrid	Not Masters Series				A	1R	A	A	A	A	A	A	0 / 1	0–1	0%
Paris	A	A	A	A	A	A	1R	A	A	A	A	A	0 / 1	0–1	0%
Win–loss	2–1	0–1	1–1	1–2	0–0	1–3	2–6	3–4	0–0	0–0	0–0	0–0	0 / 18	10–18	36%

== See also ==
- List of sportspeople sanctioned for doping offences
