= 2003 Hamburg Masters – Singles =

Singles
- 2003 Hamburg Masters

Final
- Champion: (Argentina) Guillermo Coria
- Runner-up: (Argentina) Agustín Calleri
- Score: 6–3, 6–4, 6–4

Details
- Draw: 64 (4WC/8Q/3LL)
- Seeds: 16

Events
Singles	Doubles
- Hamburg Open

Guillermo Coria defeated Agustín Calleri in the final, 6–3, 6–4, 6–4 to win the singles tennis title at the 2003 Hamburg Masters.

This was the first, and only, time that all 4 men in the semifinals were from the same country, Argentina.

Roger Federer was the defending champion, but lost in the third round to Mark Philippoussis.

== Seeds ==
A champion seed is indicated in bold text while text in italics indicates the round in which that seed was eliminated.

1. (Australia) Lleyton Hewitt (third round)
2. (Spain) Carlos Moyá (second round)
3. (Switzerland) Roger Federer (third round)
4. (United States) Andy Roddick (second round)
5. (Spain) Albert Costa (second round)
6. (Czech Republic) Jiří Novák (first round)
7. (Thailand) Paradorn Srichaphan (first round)
8. (Argentina) David Nalbandian (semifinals)
9. (Germany) Rainer Schüttler (third round)
10. (France) Sébastien Grosjean (second round)
11. (Brazil) Gustavo Kuerten (third round)
12. (Argentina) **Guillermo Coria (champion)**
13. (Spain) Àlex Corretja (first round)
14. (Spain) Tommy Robredo (second round)
15. (Chile) Fernando González (quarterfinals)
16. (United States) James Blake (first round)

== Draw ==
Key

- Q = Qualifier
- WC = Wild card
- LL = Lucky loser
- Alt = Alternate
- ITF = ITF entry
- PR = Protected ranking
- SR = Special ranking
- SE = Special exempt
- JE = Junior exempt
- JR = Junior Accelerator Programme entrant
- CO = College Accelerator Programme entrant
- NG = Next Gen Accelerator Program entrant
- w/o = Walkover
- r = Retired
- d = Defaulted

=== Finals ===
Quarterfinals
15	(Chile) Fernando González	**7**	3	4
8	(Argentina) **David Nalbandian**	5	**6**	**6**
(Argentina) **Agustín Calleri**	**7**	**6**
(South Africa) Wayne Ferreira	5	2
12	(Argentina) **Guillermo Coria**	**6**	**6**
(Australia) Mark Philippoussis	2	0
(Belgium) Olivier Rochus	1	1
(Argentina) **Gastón Gaudio**	**6**	**6**

Semifinals
8	(Argentina) David Nalbandian	4	1
(Argentina) **Agustín Calleri**	**6**	**6**
12	(Argentina) **Guillermo Coria**	**6**	6^{3}	**6**
(Argentina) Gastón Gaudio	3	**7^{7}**	0

Final
(Argentina) Agustín Calleri	3	4	4
12	(Argentina) **Guillermo Coria**	**6**	**6**	**6**

=== Top half ===
==== Section 1 ====
First round
1	(Australia) **L Hewitt**	**6**	4	**6**
WC	(Germany) M Hantschk	1	**6**	4
(Ecuador) N Lapentti	4	2
(France) **A Clément**	**6**	**6**
Q	(Spain) A Martín	0	4
(Spain) **F Mantilla**	**6**	**6**
LL	(France) O Mutis	2	**6**	5
15	(Chile) **F González**	**6**	2	**7**
9	(Germany) **R Schüttler**	**7**	**6**
(Spain) D Ferrer	5	1
Q	(United States) H Armando	4	4
WC	(Germany) **L Burgsmüller**	**6**	**6**
Q	(France) **A Dupuis**	**6**	**6**
(France) F Santoro	3	3
LL	(France) J-R Lisnard	3	3
8	(Argentina) **D Nalbandian**	**6**	**6**

Second round
1	(Australia) **L Hewitt**	6^{7}	**6**	**7^{8}**
(France) A Clément	**7^{9}**	4	6^{6}
(Spain) F Mantilla	2	1
15	(Chile) **F González**	**6**	**6**
9	(Germany) **R Schüttler**	**6**	4	**6**
WC	(Germany) L Burgsmüller	4	**6**	4
Q	(France) A Dupuis	**7**	2	3
8	(Argentina) **D Nalbandian**	5	**6**	**6**

Third round
1	(Australia) L Hewitt	1	**6**	0
15	(Chile) **F González**	**6**	3	**6**
9	(Germany) R Schüttler	6^{3}	2
8	(Argentina) **D Nalbandian**	**7^{7}**	**6**

Quarterfinals
15	(Chile) F González	**7**	3	4
8	(Argentina) **D Nalbandian**	5	**6**	**6**

==== Section 2 ====
First round
4	(United States) **A Roddick**	**6**	**6**
(Croatia) I Ljubičić	4	4
(Argentina) **A Calleri**	3	**7^{7}**	**7**
(South Korea) H-T Lee	**6**	6^{1}	5
(Slovakia) K Kučera	5	4
(Argentina) **M Zabaleta**	**7**	**6**
(Czech Republic) R Štěpánek	4	3
14	(Spain) **T Robredo**	**6**	**6**
11	(Brazil) **G Kuerten**	**6**	**6**
(Argentina) J I Chela	2	4
Q	(Romania) A Voinea	0	2
(Russia) **N Davydenko**	**6**	**6**
(South Africa) **W Ferreira**	**6**	**6**
WC	(Germany) A Waske	3	2
(Spain) **F López**	**6**	**6**
7	(Thailand) P Srichaphan	4	3

Second round
4	(United States) A Roddick	**6**	2	3
(Argentina) **A Calleri**	3	**6**	**6**
(Argentina) **M Zabaleta**	3	**6**	**6**
14	(Spain) T Robredo	**6**	3	1
11	(Brazil) **G Kuerten**	**7**	**6**
(Russia) N Davydenko	5	0
(South Africa) **W Ferreira**	**6**	**6**
(Spain) F López	1	2

Third round
(Argentina) **A Calleri**	**6**	**6**
(Argentina) M Zabaleta	3	0
11	(Brazil) G Kuerten	6^{4}	4
(South Africa) **W Ferreira**	**7^{7}**	**6**

Quarterfinals
(Argentina) **A Calleri**	**7**	**6**
(South Africa) W Ferreira	5	2

=== Bottom half ===
==== Section 3 ====
First round
6	(Czech Republic) J Novák	1	4
(Russia) **M Youzhny**	**6**	**6**
LL	(Slovakia) **K Beck**	**6**	3	**6**
(Australia) W Arthurs	4	**6**	3
(Finland) **J Nieminen**	**6**	0	**6**
(Austria) S Koubek	4	**6**	1
(United States) V Spadea	2	2
12	(Argentina) **G Coria**	**6**	**6**
13	(Spain) À Corretja	6^{3}	**6**	3
(Belgium) **X Malisse**	**7^{7}**	4	**6**
(Netherlands) R Sluiter	4	5
(Australia) **M Philippoussis**	**6**	**7**
(Slovakia) D Hrbatý	**7^{7}**	4	4
Q	(Armenia) **S Sargsian**	6^{4}	**6**	**6**
(Belarus) M Mirnyi	3	3
3	(Switzerland) **R Federer**	**6**	**6**

Second round
(Russia) **M Youzhny**	6^{7}	**6**	**6**
LL	(Slovakia) K Beck	**7^{9}**	4	2
(Finland) J Nieminen	3	4
12	(Argentina) **G Coria**	**6**	**6**
(Belgium) X Malisse	3	6^{4}
(Australia) **M Philippoussis**	**6**	**7^{7}**
Q	(Armenia) S Sargsian	1	1
3	(Switzerland) **R Federer**	**6**	**6**

Third round
(Russia) M Youzhny	3	3
12	(Argentina) **G Coria**	**6**	**6**
(Australia) **M Philippoussis**	**6**	2	**6**
3	(Switzerland) R Federer	3	**6**	3

Quarterfinals
12	(Argentina) **G Coria**	**6**	**6**
(Australia) M Philippoussis	2	0

==== Section 4 ====
First round
5	(Spain) **A Costa**	**6**	**6**
WC	(Germany) N Kiefer	4	4
(Morocco) Y El Aynaoui	6^{7}	4
(Belgium) **O Rochus**	**7^{9}**	**6**
(United States) J-M Gambill	5	4
(United Kingdom) **T Henman**	**7**	**6**
Q	(Italy) F Volandri	3	4
10	(France) **S Grosjean**	**6**	**6**
16	(United States) J Blake	**7^{7}**	1	2
(Argentina) **G Gaudio**	6^{3}	**6**	**6**
(United States) M Fish	**7**	4	2
(Spain) **D Sánchez**	5	**6**	**6**
(France) P-H Mathieu	5	4
Q	(Spain) **R Nadal**	**7**	**6**
Q	(Australia) S Draper	3	**7**	3
2	(Spain) **C Moyá**	**6**	5	**6**

Second round
5	(Spain) A Costa	**6**	3	6^{3}
(Belgium) **O Rochus**	3	**6**	**7^{7}**
(United Kingdom) **T Henman**	**6**	3	**6**
10	(France) S Grosjean	0	**6**	2
(Argentina) **G Gaudio**	6^{8}	**6**	**6**
(Spain) D Sánchez	**7^{10}**	3	1
Q	(Spain) **R Nadal**	**7**	**6**
2	(Spain) C Moyá	5	4

Third round
(Belgium) **O Rochus**	**6**	**6**
(United Kingdom) T Henman	4	3
(Argentina) **G Gaudio**	**6**	**6**
Q	(Spain) R Nadal	2	2

Quarterfinals
(Belgium) O Rochus	1	1
(Argentina) **G Gaudio**	**6**	**6**

== Qualifying ==
=== Qualifying seeds ===
1. (Spain) **Alberto Martín (qualified)**
2. (Sweden) Jonas Björkman (first round)
3. (Armenia) **Sargis Sargsian (qualified)**
4. (United States) Brian Vahaly (first round)
5. (France) Julien Boutter (first round, retired due to an elbow injury)
6. (Slovakia) Karol Beck (qualifying competition, **lucky loser**)
7. (Croatia) Mario Ančić (first round)
8. (Peru) Luis Horna (first round)
9. (France) Olivier Mutis (qualifying competition, **lucky loser**)
10. (Chile) Nicolás Massú (first round)
11. (Spain) **Rafael Nadal (qualified)**
12. (France) **Antony Dupuis (qualified)**
13. (Romania) **Adrian Voinea (qualified)**
14. (France) Jean-René Lisnard (qualifying competition, **lucky loser**)
15. (Italy) **Filippo Volandri (qualified)**
16. (Georgia (country)) Irakli Labadze (qualifying competition)

=== Qualifiers ===
1. (Spain) **Alberto Martín**
2. (Romania) **Adrian Voinea**
3. (Armenia) **Sargis Sargsian**
4. (United States) **Hugo Armando**
5. (France) **Antony Dupuis**
6. (Italy) **Filippo Volandri**
7. (Australia) **Scott Draper**
8. (Spain) **Rafael Nadal**

=== Lucky losers ===
1. (Slovakia) **Karol Beck**
2. (France) **Olivier Mutis**
3. (France) **Jean-René Lisnard**

=== Qualifying draw ===
==== First qualifier ====
First round
1	**(Spain) Alberto Martín**	**6**	**6**
Alt	(Argentina) Gastón Etlis	2	3
WC	**(Germany) Denis Gremelmayr**	4	**7**	**7^{8}**
10	(Chile) Nicolás Massú	**6**	5	6^{6}

Qualifying competition
1	**(Spain) Alberto Martín**	**6**	3
WC	(Germany) Denis Gremelmayr	4	0^{r}

==== Second qualifier ====
First round
2	(Sweden) Jonas Björkman	6^{5}	2
**(Australia) Todd Larkham**	**7^{7}**	**6**
(Germany) Oliver Gross	**6**	1	4
13	**(Romania) Adrian Voinea**	4	**6**	**6**

Qualifying competition
(Australia) Todd Larkham	3	6^{1}
13	**(Romania) Adrian Voinea**	**6**	**7^{7}**

==== Third qualifier ====
First round
3	**(Armenia) Sargis Sargsian**	**6**	**6**
WC	(Germany) David Prinosil	1	2
(Hungary) Attila Sávolt	4	**6**	2
16	**(Georgia (country)) Irakli Labadze**	**6**	4	**6**

Qualifying competition
3	**(Armenia) Sargis Sargsian**	**6**	**7**
16	(Georgia (country)) Irakli Labadze	2	5

==== Fourth qualifier ====
First round
4	(United States) Brian Vahaly	1	**6**	5
**(United States) Hugo Armando**	**6**	3	**7**
(Germany) Michael Kohlmann	1	0
14	**(France) Jean-René Lisnard**	**6**	**6**

Qualifying competition
**(United States) Hugo Armando**	**6**	**7^{7}**
14	(France) Jean-René Lisnard	1	6^{4}

==== Fifth qualifier ====
First round
5	(France) Julien Boutter	0^{r}
**(Czech Republic) Tomáš Zíb**	4
WC	(Germany) Andreas Beck	4	4
12	**(France) Antony Dupuis**	**6**	**6**

Qualifying competition
(Czech Republic) Tomáš Zíb	6^{3}	4
12	**(France) Antony Dupuis**	**7^{7}**	**6**

==== Sixth qualifier ====
First round
6	**(Slovakia) Karol Beck**	**6**	4	**6**
(Russia) Igor Kunitsyn	4	**6**	3
(Spain) Álex Calatrava	4	2
15	**(Italy) Filippo Volandri**	**6**	**6**

Qualifying competition
6	(Slovakia) Karol Beck	4	4
15	**(Italy) Filippo Volandri**	**6**	**6**

==== Seventh qualifier ====
First round
7	(Croatia) Mario Ančić	3	3
**(Australia) Scott Draper**	**6**	**6**
WC	(Switzerland) Roman Valent	3	**6**	1
9	**(France) Olivier Mutis**	**6**	1	**6**

Qualifying competition
**(Australia) Scott Draper**	**7^{7}**	**6**
9	(France) Olivier Mutis	6^{4}	4

==== Eighth qualifier ====
First round
8	(Peru) Luis Horna	4	6^{0}
**(Australia) Peter Luczak**	**6**	**7^{7}**
(France) Grégory Carraz	6^{8}	**6**	3
11	**(Spain) Rafael Nadal**	**7^{10}**	3	**6**

Qualifying competition
(Australia) Peter Luczak	2	1
11	**(Spain) Rafael Nadal**	**6**	**6**
