= Federico Browne =

Argentine tennis player

- Country (sports): Argentina
- Born: 7 April 1976 (age 48); Buenos Aires, Argentina
- Height: 180 cm (5 ft 11 in)
- Turned pro: 1994
- Plays: Right-handed
- Prize money: $370,589

Singles
- Career record: 11–20
- Career titles: 0
- Highest ranking: No. 106 (25 August 2003)

Grand Slam singles results
- French Open: 2R (2000, 2003)

Doubles
- Career record: 8–15
- Career titles: 0
- Highest ranking: No. 77 (14 June 2004)

Grand Slam doubles results
- French Open: 2R (2004)
- Wimbledon: 1R (2004)
- US Open: 1R (2004)

Federico Browne (born 7 April 1976) is a former professional tennis player from Argentina.

== Career ==
Browne was the number one ranked junior in the world in 1994, winning numerous titles that year, including the Banana Bowl. He was also the 1994 Banana Bowl doubles runner-up, with Carlos Jose Tori. In the 1994 US Open he reached the semi-finals, where he was beaten by Sjeng Schalken and he was a semi-finalist in the Orange Bowl as well, for the second successive year.

In 1995, Browne appeared in a Davis Cup tie for Argentina. He played the second singles rubber, against Venezuelan Nicolás Pereira, who beat him in straight sets.

His best performance on the ATP Tour came at Buenos Aires in 2004, when he and Diego Veronelli were runners-up in the men's doubles. He also made doubles semi-finals in Sopot partnering Enzo Artoni and the Shanghai Open with Ivo Karlović, both in 2003. On the singles circuit he reached two quarter-finals, at the 2000 BMW Open as a lucky loser and at Casablanca in 2003.

On each of the two occasions he competed in the main singles draw of the French Open, Browne made the second round. In 2000 he defeated Juan Antonio Marín in the opening round, before losing in his next match by Sébastien Grosjean, in a five setter. Three years later he came from two sets down to defeat world number 59 Olivier Rochus in the first round. He was beaten in the second round by Félix Mantilla. His best doubles showing at Grand Slam level was a second round appearance in the 2004 French Open, which he and partner Karlovic earned after defeating Tomáš Berdych and Dominik Hrbatý.

He is now a tennis coach.

== ATP career finals ==
=== Doubles: 1 (0–1) ===
Result	W–L	Date	Tournament	Surface	Partner	Opponents	Score
Loss	0–1	Feb 2004	Buenos Aires, Argentina	Clay	(Argentina) Diego Veronelli	(Argentina) Lucas Arnold Ker (Argentina) Mariano Hood	5–7, 7–6^{(7–2)}, 4–6

== Challenger titles ==
=== Singles: (3) ===
No.	Year	Tournament	Surface	Opponent	Score
1.	1999	Mexico City, Mexico	Clay	(Argentina) Gastón Etlis	4–6, 7–6^{(4)}, 6–4
2.	2002	Donetsk, Ukraine	Clay	(Germany) Simon Greul	6–2, 6–1
3.	2002	Reunion Island	Hard	(Romania) Răzvan Sabău	6–0, 4–6, 7–5

=== Doubles: (10) ===
No.	Year	Tournament	Surface	Partner	Opponents	Score
1.	1998	Santiago, Chile	Clay	(Italy) Enzo Artoni	(Chile) Hermes Gamonal (Brazil) Ricardo Schlachter	6–2, 6–4
2.	2001	Buenos Aires, Argentina	Clay	(Argentina) Ignacio Hirigoyen	(Argentina) Gastón Etlis (Argentina) Martin Rodríguez	6–4, 7–6^{(6)}
3.	2002	Kyiv, Ukraine	Clay	(Netherlands) Fred Hemmes Jr.	(Georgia (country)) Irakli Labadze (Kazakhstan) Yuri Schukin	6–4, 6–3
4.	2002	Donetsk, Ukraine	Clay	(Italy) Leonardo Azzaro	(Russia) Mikhail Elgin (Russia) Dmitry Vlasov	6–7^{(3)}, 7–6^{(4)}, 7–5
5.	2002	Samarkand, Uzbekistan	Clay	(Netherlands) Rogier Wassen	(Russia) Vadim Kutsenko (Uzbekistan) Oleg Ogorodov	3–6, 7–6^{(3)}, 7–6^{(3)}
6.	2002	Reunion Island	Hard	(Israel) Jonathan Erlich	(Switzerland) Marco Chiudinelli (Czech Republic) Jaroslav Levinský	6–1, 4–6, 6–3
7.	2002	São Paulo, Brazil	Hard	(Netherlands) Rogier Wassen	(Argentina) Ignacio Hirigoyen (Israel) Andy Ram	7–6^{(0)}, 7–6^{(3)}
8.	2003	Burnie, Australia	Hard	(Netherlands) Rogier Wassen	(Australia) Raphael Durek (Australia) Alun Jones	1–6, 6–3, 6–2
9.	2003	Reunion Island	Hard	(Netherlands) Rogier Wassen	(Netherlands) Fred Hemmes Jr. (Netherlands) Peter Wessels	6–1, 6–7^{(4)}, 6–3
10.	2004	Salinas, Ecuador	Hard	(Pakistan) Aisam-ul-Haq Qureshi	(Venezuela) José de Armas (United States) Eric Nunez	6–3, 6–3
