= Lucas Arnold Ker =

Argentine tennis player

- Country (sports): Argentina
- Residence: Barcelona, Spain
- Born: 12 October 1974 (age 52) Buenos Aires, Argentina
- Height: 1.80 m (5 ft 11 in)
- Turned pro: 1994
- Retired: 2016
- Plays: Right-handed
- Prize money: US$ 1,745,936

Singles
- Career record: 22–31
- Career titles: 0; 2 Challenger, 0 Futures
- Highest ranking: No. 77 (20 July 1998)

Grand Slam singles results
- Australian Open: 1R (1998, 1999)
- French Open: 2R (1998)
- Wimbledon: 1R (1998)
- US Open: 3R (1998)

Doubles
- Career record: 299–258
- Career titles: 15; 19 Challenger, 1 Futures
- Highest ranking: No. 21 (8 March 2004)

Grand Slam doubles results
- Australian Open: 3R (1999, 2002, 2008, 2009)
- French Open: SF (1997)
- Wimbledon: 3R (2001)
- US Open: 3R (2003)

Grand Slam mixed doubles results
- Australian Open: 2R (2002, 2004)
- French Open: QF (2004)
- Wimbledon: 2R (2001, 2004, 2005, 2009)
- US Open: 2R (2001)

Lucas Arnold Ker (Spanish pronunciation: [ˈlukas aɾˈnol ˈkeɾ]; born 12 October 1974) is an Argentine former professional tennis player.

Arnold Ker started playing tennis in the Olivos Tenis Club of Buenos Aires, under coach Malcolm Campbell. He is the younger brother of Patricio Arnold. He is right-handed and turned professional in 1994. He played several times for the Argentine Davis Cup team, where he made his debut in 1997 against Venezuela. Arnold Ker was Roger Federer's opponent in the latter's first professional match in 1998, beating the 17-year-old future singles world No. 1 and 20-time major singles champion in straight sets. Arnold Ker retired from professional tennis in 2016.

== Cancer ==
In August 2006, he was diagnosed with testicular cancer. The testicle was removed, and he successfully underwent chemotherapy. In 2008, he was in remission and returned to playing professional tennis.

== ATP Tour career finals ==
=== Doubles: 33 (15 titles, 18 runner-ups) ===
Legend Grand Slam tournaments (0–0) ATP World Tour Finals (0–0) ATP World Tour Masters 1000 (0–0) ATP World Tour 500 Series (0–5) ATP World Tour 250 Series (15–13)	Titles by surface Hard (0–1) Clay (15–15) Grass (0–0) Carpet (0–2)	Titles by setting Outdoor (15–16) Indoor (0–2)

Result	W–L	Date	Tournament	Tier	Surface	Partner	Opponents	Score
Win	1–0	Aug 1996	San Marino, San Marino	World Series	Clay	(Argentina) Pablo Albano	(Argentina) Mariano Hood (Argentina) Sebastián Prieto	6–1, 6–3
Loss	1–1	Oct 1996	Marbella Open, Spain	World Series	Clay	(Argentina) Pablo Albano	(Australia) Andrew Kratzmann (United States) Jack Waite	7–6, 3–6, 4–6
Win	2–1	Jun 1999	Merano Open, Italy	World Series	Clay	(Brazil) Jaime Oncins	(Denmark) Marc-Kevin Goellner (Philippines) Eric Taino	6–4, 7–6^{(7–1)}
Win	3–1	Aug 1999	San Marino, San Marino	World Series	Clay	(Argentina) Mariano Hood	(Czech Republic) Petr Pála (Czech Republic) Pavel Vízner	6–3, 6–2
Win	4–1	Sep 1999	Majorca Open, Spain	World Series	Clay	(Spain) Tomás Carbonell	(Spain) Alberto Berasategui (Spain) Francisco Roig	6–1, 6–4
Win	5–1	Oct 1999	Bucharest, Romania	World Series	Clay	(Argentina) Martín García	(Germany) Marc-Kevin Goellner (United States) Francisco Montana	6–3, 2–6, 6–3
Loss	5–2	Feb 2000	Pacific Coast Championships, United States	World Series	Hard	(Philippines) Eric Taino	(United States) Jan-Michael Gambill (United States) Scott Humphries	1–6, 4–6
Win	6–2	Mar 2000	Bogotá, Colombia	International Series	Clay	(Argentina) Pablo Albano	(Spain) Joan Balcells (Colombia) Mauricio Hadad	7-6^{(7–4)}, 1–6, 6–2
Loss	6–3	Jul 2000	Stuttgart Open, Germany	International Gold	Clay	(United States) Donald Johnson	(Czech Republic) Jiří Novák (Czech Republic) David Rikl	7–5, 2–6, 3–6
Win	7–3	Feb 2001	Movistar Open, Chile	International Series	Clay	(Spain) Tomás Carbonell	(Argentina) Mariano Hood (Argentina) Sebastián Prieto	6–4, 2–6, 6–3
Win	8–3	Feb 2001	Buenos Aires, Argentina	International Series	Clay	(Spain) Tomás Carbonell	(Argentina) Mariano Hood (Argentina) Sebastián Prieto	5–7, 7–5, 7–6^{(7–5)}
Loss	8–4	Feb 2002	Movistar Open, Chile	International Series	Clay	(Argentina) Luis Lobo	(Argentina) Gastón Etlis (Argentina) Martín Rodríguez	3–6, 4–6
Loss	8–5	Apr 2002	Barcelona, Spain	International Gold	Clay	(Argentina) Gastón Etlis	(Australia) Michael Hill (Czech Republic) Daniel Vacek	4–6, 4–6
Loss	8–6	Jul 2002	Kitzbühel, Austria	International Gold	Clay	(Spain) Àlex Corretja	(South Africa) Robbie Koenig (Japan) Thomas Shimada	6–7^{(3–7)}, 4–6
Win	9–6	Sep 2002	Palermo, Italy	International Series	Clay	(Argentina) Luis Lobo	(Czech Republic) František Čermák (Czech Republic) Leoš Friedl	6–4, 4–6, 6–2
Loss	9–7	Feb 2003	Buenos Aires, Argentina	International Series	Clay	(Argentina) David Nalbandian	(Argentina) Mariano Hood (Argentina) Sebastián Prieto	2–6, 2–6
Loss	9–8	Apr 2003	Estoril, Portugal	International Series	Clay	(Argentina) Mariano Hood	(India) Mahesh Bhupathi (Belarus) Max Mirnyi	1–6, 2–6
Win	10–8	May 2003	Valencia, Spain	International Series	Clay	(Argentina) Mariano Hood	(United States) Brian MacPhie (Serbia and Montenegro) Nenad Zimonjić	6–1, 6–7^{(7–9)}, 6-4
Loss	10–9	Jul 2003	Båstad, Sweden	International Series	Clay	(Argentina) Mariano Hood	(Sweden) Simon Aspelin (Italy) Massimo Bertolini	7–6^{(7–3)}, 0–6, 4–6
Win	11–9	Sep 2003	Palermo, Italy	International Series	Clay	(Argentina) Mariano Hood	(Czech Republic) František Čermák (Czech Republic) Leoš Friedl	7-6^{(8–6)}, 6–7^{(3–7)}, 6–3
Loss	11–10	Oct 2003	Swiss Indoors, Switzerland	International Series	Carpet	(Argentina) Mariano Hood	(The Bahamas) Mark Knowles (Canada) Daniel Nestor	4–6, 2–6
Win	12–10	Feb 2004	Buenos Aires, Argentina	International Series	Clay	(Argentina) Mariano Hood	(Argentina) Federico Browne (Argentina) Diego Veronelli	7–5, 6–7^{(2–7)}, 6–4
Loss	12–11	Jul 2004	Kitzbühel, Austria	International Gold	Clay	(Argentina) Martín García	(Czech Republic) František Čermák (Czech Republic) Leoš Friedl	3–6, 5–7
Win	13–11	Sep 2004	Bucharest, Romania	International Series	Clay	(Argentina) Mariano Hood	(Argentina) José Acasuso (Spain) Óscar Hernández	7–6^{(7–5)}, 6–1
Win	14–11	Oct 2004	Palermo, Italy	International Series	Clay	(Argentina) Mariano Hood	(Argentina) Gastón Etlis (Argentina) Martín Rodríguez	7–5, 6–2
Loss	14–12	Oct 2004	Swiss Indoors, Switzerland	International Series	Carpet	(Argentina) Mariano Hood	(United States) Bob Bryan (United States) Mike Bryan	6–7^{(9–11)}, 2–6
Loss	14–13	Apr 2005	Valencia, Spain	International Series	Clay	(Argentina) Mariano Hood	(Chile) Fernando González (Argentina) Martín Rodríguez	4–6, 4–6
Win	15–13	May 2005	Sankt Pölten, Austria	International Series	Clay	(Australia) Paul Hanley	(Czech Republic) Martin Damm (Argentina) Mariano Hood	6–3, 6–4
Loss	15–14	Aug 2005	Sopot, Poland	International Series	Clay	(Argentina) Sebastián Prieto	(Poland) Mariusz Fyrstenberg (Poland) Marcin Matkowski	6–7^{(7–9)}, 4–6
Loss	15–15	Apr 2006	Estoril, Portugal	International Series	Clay	(Czech Republic) Leoš Friedl	(Czech Republic) Lukáš Dlouhý (Czech Republic) Pavel Vízner	3–6, 1–6
Loss	15–16	Jul 2006	Amersfoort, Netherlands	International Series	Clay	(Germany) Christopher Kas	(Spain) Alberto Martín (Spain) Fernando Vicente	4–6, 3–6
Loss	15–17	Jul 2008	Kitzbühel, Austria	International Gold	Clay	(Belgium) Olivier Rochus	(United States) James Cerretani (Romania) Victor Hănescu	3–6, 5–7
Loss	15–18	Feb 2009	Brasil Open, Brazil	250 Series	Clay	(Argentina) Juan Mónaco	(Spain) Marcel Granollers (Spain) Tommy Robredo	4–6, 5–7

== ATP Challenger and ITF Futures finals ==
=== Singles: 5 (2–3) ===
Legend ATP Challenger (2–3) ITF Futures (0–0)	Finals by surface Hard (0–0) Clay (2–3) Grass (0–0) Carpet (0–0)

Result	W–L	Date	Tournament	Tier	Surface	Opponent	Score
Loss	0–1	Aug 1996	Merano, Italy	Challenger	Clay	(Spain) Juan-Albert Viloca-Puig	6–7, 4–6
Win	1–1	Aug 1997	Merano, Italy	Challenger	Clay	(Italy) Vincenzo Santopadre	6–1, 6–4
Win	2–1	Sep 1997	São Paulo, Brazil	Challenger	Clay	(Brazil) Fernando Meligeni	6–4, 1–0 ret.
Loss	2–2	Apr 1998	Paget, Bermuda	Challenger	Clay	(Argentina) Hernán Gumy	6–7, 6–4, 2–6
Loss	2–3	Jun 1998	Braunschweig, Germany	Challenger	Clay	(Argentina) Franco Squillari	2–6, 6–4, 1–6

=== Doubles: 28 (20–8) ===
Legend ATP Challenger (19–7) ITF Futures (1–1)	Finals by surface Hard (1–1) Clay (19–7) Grass (0–0) Carpet (0–0)

Result	W–L	Date	Tournament	Tier	Surface	Partner	Opponents	Score
Win	1–0	Jan 1994	Mar del Plata, Argentina	Challenger	Clay	(Argentina) Patricio Arnold	(Italy) Filippo Messori (Italy) Federico Mordegan	6–4, 7–5
Win	2–0	May 1994	Bogotá, Colombia	Challenger	Clay	(Ecuador) Pablo Campana	(Brazil) Danilo Marcelino (Portugal) Nuno Marques	3–6, 7–6, 7–6
Loss	2–1	Mar 1995	Punta Del Este, Uruguay	Challenger	Clay	(Argentina) Pablo Albano	(Argentina) Christian Miniussi (Uruguay) Diego Pérez	6–4, 5–7, 1–6
Win	3–1	Jul 1995	São Paulo, Brazil	Challenger	Hard	(Argentina) Pablo Albano	(Brazil) Otavio Della (Brazil) Marcelo Saliola	6–2, 4–6, 6–1
Win	4–1	May 1996	Ljubljana, Slovenia	Challenger	Clay	(Argentina) Pablo Albano	(Sweden) Rikard Bergh (United States) Shelby Cannon	6–1, 3–6, 6–1
Loss	4–2	Jun 1996	Cali, Colombia	Challenger	Clay	(Argentina) Patricio Arnold	(United States) Brett Hansen-Dent (United States) T J Middleton	4–6, 3–6
Win	5–2	Jul 1996	Ostend, Belgium	Challenger	Clay	(Czech Republic) David Škoch	(Belgium) Wim Neefs (Belgium) Yuri Soberon	7–6, 6–1
Loss	5–3	Apr 1997	Paget, Bermuda	Challenger	Clay	(Argentina) Daniel Orsanic	(The Bahamas) Mark Knowles (Argentina) Javier Frana	3–6, 7–6, 3–6
Win	6–3	May 1997	Ljubljana, Slovenia	Challenger	Clay	(Argentina) Daniel Orsanic	(Czech Republic) David Škoch (Netherlands) Fernon Wibier	6–0, 6–4
Win	7–3	Aug 1997	Graz, Austria	Challenger	Clay	(Belgium) Tom Vanhoudt	(Spain) Alberto Martín (Spain) Albert Portas	6–1, 6–2
Win	8–3	Oct 1997	Santiago, Chile	Challenger	Clay	(Brazil) Jaime Oncins	(Argentina) Diego del Río (Argentina) Mariano Puerta	6–2, 6–2
Win	9–3	Nov 1997	Palmar, Puerto Rico	Challenger	Clay	(Argentina) Daniel Orsanic	(Argentina) Mariano Hood (Argentina) Sebastián Prieto	7–5, 3–6, 6–3
Win	10–3	Feb 1999	Punta Del Este, Uruguay	Challenger	Clay	(Uruguay) Marcelo Filippini	(Paraguay) Paulo Carvallo (Uruguay) Gonzalo Rodríguez	6–1, 6–4
Loss	10–4	Mar 1999	Salinas, Ecuador	Challenger	Hard	(Argentina) Daniel Orsanic	(Argentina) Mariano Hood (Argentina) Sebastián Prieto	2–6, 6–7
Win	11–4	Nov 2000	Montevideo, Uruguay	Challenger	Clay	(Argentina) Gastón Etlis	(Spain) Joan Balcells (Spain) Germán Puentes	6–4, 6–4
Win	12–4	Nov 2000	Buenos Aires, Argentina	Challenger	Clay	(Argentina) Pablo Albano	(Argentina) Sergio Roitman (Argentina) Andrés Schneiter	6–3, 4–6, 6–2
Win	13–4	May 2003	Zagreb, Croatia	Challenger	Clay	(Argentina) Mariano Hood	(Sweden) Simon Aspelin (Australia) Todd Perry	6–1, 6–3
Win	14–4	Jul 2003	Košice, Slovakia	Challenger	Clay	(Argentina) Mariano Hood	(Spain) Rubén Ramírez Hidalgo (Spain) Salvador Navarro	2–1 ret.
Win	15–4	Sep 2004	Szczecin, Poland	Challenger	Clay	(Argentina) Mariano Hood	(Spain) Óscar Hernández (Spain) Alberto Martín	6–0, 6–4
Loss	15–5	Sep 2005	Argentina F12, Buenos Aires	Futures	Clay	(Argentina) Diego Cristin	(Argentina) Emiliano Massa (Argentina) Leonardo Mayer	6–7^{(4–7)}, 3–6
Loss	15–6	Oct 2005	Santiago, Chile	Challenger	Clay	(Ecuador) Giovanni Lapentti	(Austria) Daniel Köllerer (Austria) Oliver Marach	4–6, 3–6
Win	16–6	Nov 2005	Buenos Aires, Argentina	Challenger	Clay	(Argentina) Sebastián Prieto	(Spain) Rubén Ramírez Hidalgo (Spain) Santiago Ventura	6–0, 6–4
Win	17–6	Jul 2006	Biella, Italy	Challenger	Clay	(Argentina) Agustín Calleri	(Argentina) Juan Martín del Potro (Argentina) Martín Vassallo Argüello	7–6^{(7–5)}, 6–2
Win	18–6	Oct 2007	Argentina F18, Tandil	Futures	Clay	(Argentina) Lionel Noviski	(Argentina) Máximo González (Argentina) Diego Junqueira	6–3, 6–2
Win	19–6	Jul 2009	Scheveningen, Netherlands	Challenger	Clay	(Argentina) Máximo González	(Netherlands) Thomas Schoorel (Netherlands) Nick van der Meer	7–5, 6–2
Win	20–6	Aug 2009	San Marino, San Marino	Challenger	Clay	(Argentina) Sebastián Prieto	(Sweden) Johan Brunström (Netherlands Antilles) Jean-Julien Rojer	7–6^{(7–4)}, 2–6, [10–7]
Loss	20–7	Oct 2009	Buenos Aires, Argentina	Challenger	Clay	(Argentina) Máximo González	(Argentina) Brian Dabul (Argentina) Sergio Roitman	7–6^{(7–4)}, 0–6, [8–10]
Loss	20–8	Nov 2015	Buenos Aires, Argentina	Challenger	Clay	(Argentina) Guido Andreozzi	(Argentina) Horacio Zeballos (Chile) Julio Peralta	2–6, 5–7

== Performance timelines ==
Key
W	F	SF	QF	#R	RR	Q#	DNQ	A	NH

(W) winner; (F) finalist; (SF) semifinalist; (QF) quarterfinalist; (#R) rounds 4, 3, 2, 1; (RR) round-robin stage; (Q#) qualification round; (DNQ) did not qualify; (A) absent; (NH) not held; (SR) strike rate (events won / competed); (W–L) win–loss record.

=== Singles ===
Tournament	1994	1995	1996	1997	1998	1999	SR	W–L	Win %
Grand Slam Tournaments
Australian Open	A	A	A	A	1R	1R	0 / 2	0–2	0%
French Open	A	A	A	Q1	2R	Q3	0 / 1	1–1	50%
Wimbledon	A	A	A	A	1R	A	0 / 1	0–1	0%
US Open	A	A	A	A	3R	A	0 / 1	2–1	67%
Win–loss	0–0	0–0	0–0	0–0	3–4	0–1	0 / 5	3–5	38%
ATP Tour Masters 1000
Indian Wells Masters	A	A	A	Q1	Q1	A	0 / 0	0–0	–
Miami Open	Q1	A	A	2R	2R	A	0 / 2	1–2	33%
Hamburg	A	A	A	A	Q1	A	0 / 0	0–0	–
Italian Open	A	A	A	A	1R	A	0 / 1	0–1	0%
Stuttgart	A	A	A	Q1	Q1	A	0 / 0	0–0	–
Win–loss	0–0	0–0	0–0	0–1	1–2	0–0	0 / 3	1–3	25%

=== Doubles ===
Tournament	1997	1998	1999	2000	2001	2002	2003	2004	2005	2006	2007	2008	2009	2010	2011	SR	W–L	Win %
Grand Slam Tournaments
Australian Open	A	1R	3R	A	2R	3R	1R	1R	A	A	A	3R	3R	2R	A	0 / 9	10–9	53%
French Open	SF	1R	1R	2R	QF	3R	QF	1R	3R	1R	A	3R	1R	A	1R	0 / 13	17–13	57%
Wimbledon	A	A	A	1R	3R	1R	1R	2R	1R	1R	A	2R	1R	A	A	0 / 9	4–9	31%
US Open	A	2R	A	2R	2R	1R	3R	2R	1R	1R	A	2R	1R	A	1R	0 / 11	7–11	39%
Win–loss	4–1	1–3	2–2	2–3	7–4	4–4	5–4	2–4	2–3	0–3	0–0	6–4	2–4	1–1	0–2	0 / 42	38–42	48%
ATP Tour Masters 1000
Indian Wells Masters	Q1	1R	A	A	2R	2R	1R	1R	1R	A	A	A	A	A	A	0 / 6	2–6	25%
Miami Open	2R	QF	A	A	2R	3R	1R	1R	2R	A	A	A	1R	A	A	0 / 8	6–8	43%
Monte-Carlo Masters	A	A	A	2R	1R	2R	1R	1R	1R	A	A	A	1R	A	A	0 / 7	2–7	22%
Rome Masters	A	1R	A	1R	SF	2R	A	1R	1R	A	A	A	A	A	A	0 / 6	4–6	40%
Hamburg	A	QF	A	QF	1R	1R	A	1R	1R	A	A	A	NMS			0 / 6	4–6	40%
Cincinnati Masters	A	A	A	A	1R	1R	A	A	A	A	A	A	A	A	A	0 / 2	0–2	0%
Stuttgart	2R	2R	A	Q2	2R	Not Held										0 / 3	3–3	50%
Madrid Masters	Not Held					1R	2R	A	A	A	A	A	A	A	A	0 / 2	1–2	33%
Paris Masters	A	A	A	A	2R	1R	1R	A	A	A	A	2R	A	A	A	0 / 4	2–4	33%
Win–loss	2–2	5–5	0–0	3–3	6–8	5–8	1–5	0–5	1–5	0–0	0–0	1–1	0–2	0–0	0–0	0 / 44	24–44	35%

=== Mixed doubles ===
Tournament	1997	1998	1999	2000	2001	2002	2003	2004	2005	2006	2007	2008	2009	SR	W–L	Win %
Grand Slam Tournaments
Australian Open	A	1R	A	A	1R	2R	1R	2R	A	A	A	A	A	0 / 5	2–5	29%
French Open	2R	A	A	1R	A	1R	A	QF	1R	A	A	A	A	0 / 5	3–5	38%
Wimbledon	A	A	A	1R	2R	1R	1R	2R	2R	1R	A	A	2R	0 / 8	3–8	27%
US Open	A	A	A	1R	2R	A	A	A	A	A	A	A	A	0 / 2	1–2	33%
Win–loss	1–1	0–1	0–0	0–3	2–3	1–3	0–2	3–3	1–2	0–1	0–0	0–0	1–1	0 / 20	9–20	31%
