= Guillermo Coria =

Argentine tennis player

- Coria in 2018
- Country (sports): Argentina
- Residence: Venado Tuerto, Argentina
- Born: 13 January 1982 (age 44) Rufino, Argentina
- Height: 1.75 m (5 ft 9 in)
- Turned pro: 2000
- Retired: 28 April 2009
- Plays: Right-handed (two-handed backhand)
- Coach: Gustavo Luza (2000); Mariano Monachesi (2001); Franco Davín (2002–2003); Alberto Mancini (2003–2004); Fabián Blengino (2004); Gabriel Markus (2004); José Perlas (2004–2005); José Higueras (2006); Horacio de la Peña (2006); Hernán Gumy (2007–2008); Martin Rodríguez (2009)
- Prize money: US$5,915,620

Singles
- Career record: 218–114 (65.7%)
- Career titles: 9
- Highest ranking: No. 3 (3 May 2004)

Grand Slam singles results
- Australian Open: 4R (2003, 2005)
- French Open: F (2004)
- Wimbledon: 4R (2005)
- US Open: QF (2003, 2005)

Other tournaments
- Tour Finals: RR (2003, 2004, 2005)

Doubles
- Career record: 10–25 (28.6%)
- Career titles: 0
- Highest ranking: No. 183 (1 March 2004)

Grand Slam doubles results
- Australian Open: 1R (2003)
- Wimbledon: 1R (2004)

Guillermo Sebastián Coria (born 13 January 1982), nicknamed El Mago (The Magician in Spanish), is an Argentine former professional tennis player. He was ranked as high as world No. 3 in men's singles by the Association of Tennis Professionals (ATP), achieved in May 2004. Coria achieved his best results on clay, where he won eight of his nine ATP Tour singles titles, and during his prime years in 2003 and 2004 was considered "the world's best clay-court player." He reached the final of the 2004 French Open, losing to Gastón Gaudio despite serving for the match twice and being up two-sets-to-love. In later years, injuries and a lack of confidence affected his game, and he retired in 2009 at the age of 27.

== Career ==
Coria turned professional in 2000, finishing 2003, 2004, and 2005 as a top-ten player. He was one of the fastest players on the ATP Tour, consistently showing exceptional performances in clay-court tournaments. His playing style was that of a counter-puncher.

He was considered the "King of Clay" between 2003 and 2005 by reaching 6 out of 8 possible Masters finals (since he was absent for 2004 Rome Masters) on clay during that period. While at the French Open, he also reached semifinals in 2003 and held two match points in the final in 2004.

=== Junior ===
As a junior, Coria reached a ranking of world No. 2 in singles and world No. 5 in doubles.

Coria won the Orange Bowl 16s in 1997 and reached the finals of Orange Bowl 18s in 1998, where he was defeated by future world No. 1 Roger Federer. Coria won the boys' singles title at the 1999 French Open without dropping a single set, beating his friend and fellow Argentine, David Nalbandian in straight sets in the final. One month later, at the 1999 Wimbledon Championships, in singles as the third seed, Coria reached semifinals without dropping a set, where he was defeated by top seed Kristian Pless in straight sets. In doubles of the same tournament, however, as first seeds, Coria and Nalbandian teamed up to win the boys' doubles title by beating Todor Enev and Jarkko Nieminen.

=== Early career: failed drugs test and doping suspension ===
Coria tested positive for nandrolone in April 2001 after a match in Barcelona against Michel Kratochvil. Coria was initially banned from tennis for two years, starting in August 2001, and was fined $98,565. Coria claimed that the only supplement that he was taking was a multivitamin made by a New Jersey supplements company. His family employed a private lab to test the multivitamin, which was found to be contaminated with steroids. In December 2001, the ATP refused to acquit Coria but reduced his ban from two years to seven months, which meant that he would be free to continue with his tennis career in March 2002. Coria sued the New Jersey supplements company for more than $10 million in lost prize money and endorsements and settled after the third day of the trial for an undisclosed amount.

As a result of the seven months during which Coria was banned from playing tennis, his world ranking dropped from No. 32 to No. 97. 2002 was, therefore, a rebuilding year for Coria, and he finished 2002 ranked at world No. 45.

=== 2003–2005: "King of Clay" ===
==== 2003: Dominance on clay begins ====
Coria signaled his arrival as a world-class clay-court player in 2003 by reaching the finals in Buenos Aires, where he lost a tight best-of-three-sets match to Carlos Moyá, and at the Monte Carlo Masters, where he lost in two straight sets to Juan Carlos Ferrero. Coria went on to win his first Masters Series title at Hamburg by defeating Agustín Calleri in the final in three straight sets.

At the French Open, Coria defeated Andre Agassi in four sets in the quarterfinals, before suffering an upset loss to Martin Verkerk and his booming serves in the semifinals. In July, Coria was increasingly establishing himself as the new king of clay by winning three clay-court tournaments in three weeks, the Mercedes Cup in Stuttgart, the Generali Open in Kitzbühel and the Orange Prokom Open in Sopot. He won these three tournaments without dropping a set, dishing out five bagels and eight breadsticks in the process. He finished the year ranked No. 5 in the world.

==== 2004: French Open final ====
In 2004, Coria won the clay-court tournament in Buenos Aires and reached his first Masters final on hard court at the NASDAQ-100 Open, where he faced Andy Roddick. From the first set onwards, Coria was visibly hurt by pains in his back that later turned out to be kidney stones. Coria still won the first set 7–6, but Roddick won the next two sets 6–3, 6–1, before Coria was forced to retire during the first game of the fourth set.

Three weeks later, Coria defeated Rainer Schüttler in three straight sets in the final of the Monte Carlo Masters to win his second Masters Series title. Coria had now won five consecutive clay-court tournaments which include two consecutive Masters Series titles and had gone 26 consecutive matches unbeaten on clay. On 3 May 2004, Coria reached a career-high ranking of world No. 3. In attempting to defend his title at the Hamburg Masters, Coria increased his clay-court winning streak to 31 matches by reaching the final, where he lost to world No. 1, Roger Federer, in four sets.

At the French Open, Coria only dropped one set en route to the final, defeating Nikolay Davydenko, Juan Mónaco, Mario Ančić and Nicolas Escudé, before beating former world No. 1, Carlos Moyá, in the quarterfinals and British serve-and-volleyer, Tim Henman, in the semifinals; but he was unexpectedly defeated by unseeded compatriot Gastón Gaudio in an unprecedented all-Argentine final, 6–0, 6–3, 4–6, 1–6, 6–8. Coria had won the first two sets with ease and was in control of the third set at 4–4 and 40–0 up on serve, before Gaudio broke Coria's serve and went on to take the third set. Coria then succumbed to leg cramps for the rest of the match and was barely able to move at times, with many of his serves in the fourth set not even reaching the net. Despite this, Coria still got the advantage at several stages of the fifth set, leading by a break of serve on four separate occasions, including twice serving for the championship at 5–4 and 6–5. He had two championship points at 6–5 but he narrowly missed the line with attempted winners on both points, making him the only male player in the Open Era to lose a Grand Slam singles final after having held a championship point, until Roger Federer did so too at the 2019 Wimbledon Championships, and Jannik Sinner at the 2025 French Open. Many fans and pundits agree that Coria was never the same player after the loss.

Coria reached finals on three different surfaces (all except carpet) in 2004. He surprised some people by reaching the first grass-court final of his career at 's-Hertogenbosch, losing the final to Michaël Llodra. This was only two weeks after the devastation of losing the French Open final. Coria then went on to defeat Wesley Moodie in a five-set match in the first round of Wimbledon, which took nearly three days to complete after the start of the match, as a result of rain and poor scheduling. Coria lost in four sets in the second round to Florian Mayer and got a bad injury to his right shoulder during the match. As a result, Coria dropped out for the remainder of the season and in August, Coria had surgery on his right shoulder. He returned to the ATP Tour in November for the Masters Cup, where he performed poorly.

==== 2005: Two Masters finals on clay & service yips ====
Coria appeared in five finals after the 2004 French Open defeat and lost four of them, with three of them against the rising king of clay, Rafael Nadal. The most famous one is the Rome Masters final loss that lasted almost 5 hours and 20 minutes. It is agreed by many that it is one of the greatest matches played on clay, if not the greatest of all. Their head-to-head record was deadlocked at 1–1 prior to the match, with Nadal winning their most recent meeting at the Monte-Carlo Masters final weeks ago in four sets. Nadal took the first set 6–4 after being down a break and Coria went on to take the second 6–3. During the third set, Coria fought back from 1–5 to 3–5, where the game progressed to one of the most exciting deuces in tennis that lasted 15 minutes, featuring a variety of tactics and plays in long breathtaking rallies, although eventually Nadal pulled through and went on to take the third set 6–3. Coria took the fourth set 6–4 and led 3–0 in the fifth set with two breaks of serve and had a game point in the fourth game before Nadal broke back twice to lead 4–3 on serve in the fifth set. Eventually, the match went into tiebreak at the five-hour mark, soon after Coria had saved a championship point for Nadal in the 12th game of the fifth set. During the tiebreak, Coria fought back from a 1–5 deficit and saved another two Nadal championship points when 4–6 down in the tiebreak to level at 6–6. However, Nadal then won the next two points to win the fifth set tiebreak 8–6. As a result, Nadal had won his second consecutive Masters final of the year against Coria.

The only final Coria won in 2005 was on 31 July, when he won in Umag, Croatia, defeating Carlos Moyá in the final. Afterward, Coria joked that the small tournament was considered a fifth Grand Slam in his family because his wife Carla hails from Croatia. Coria had a surprisingly consistent 2005 season, where he was one of only three players to reach the fourth round or better at every Grand Slam, the others being Roger Federer and David Nalbandian.

Despite having a consistent season in 2005, during his tournament victory in Umag he started to suffer from the service yips, a psychological condition that renders a tennis player unable to hit the ball at the correct moment when serving. Initially, it was not very noticeable, but became more apparent at the US Open, during which Coria served a combined total of 34 double faults in his fourth-round win over Nicolás Massú and his quarterfinal loss to unseeded Robby Ginepri. Against Ginepri, having already saved five match points, Coria was serving to take the match into a fifth-set tiebreaker, when two consecutive double faults from deuce gave Ginepri the win.

As the 2005 season drew to a close, Coria's form started to dip alarmingly as a result of the high number of double faults he was serving in an increasing number of his matches. Coria lost nine of his last eleven matches of 2005. Some pundits have also speculated that his three losses in finals to the emerging Nadal may have hit his confidence worse than the loss to Gaudio.

Between 2003 and 2005, Coria compiled a record of 90–13 (87.38%) which includes a 31-match win streak on clay.

=== 2006–2009: Steady decline ===
==== 2006: Gradual loss of form ====
Coria's service yips got increasingly worse in 2006, although he still reached the third round of the Australian Open, and even managed a victory over Novak Djokovic at the Miami Masters without serving any double faults.

At the Monte-Carlo Masters, Coria came back from 1–6, 1–5 down to defeat Paul-Henri Mathieu, despite serving 20 double faults in the match. Coria then defeated Nicolas Kiefer, despite serving 22 double faults, but he was then easily beaten by Rafael Nadal in the quarterfinals. After Monte Carlo, Coria wins generally became fewer and further between, although he did manage a semifinal in Amersfoort in July 2006, where he lost to eventual champion Novak Djokovic.

Coria withdrew from the French Open and Wimbledon as he attempted to sort out marital problems, problems with his game, and an elbow injury. In August 2006, he hired Horacio de la Peña as his tennis coach. At the US Open, Coria retired in his first-round match against Ryan Sweeting after just five games. It would be 17 months before Coria played a match on the ATP Tour again.

==== 2007: Injuries and inactivity ====
Coria made his return to a Challenger in Belo Horizonte, Brazil on 22 October 2007. He lost the first set 3–6 to fellow Argentine Juan Pablo Brzezicki and subsequently retired with a back injury. He had been leading in the first set 3–1.

==== 2008: Attempted comeback ====
Coria finally returned to the main tour in the Movistar Open in Chile on 28 January 2008. He showed positive signs of recovering his form but was still defeated in the first round by Pablo Cuevas, 4–6, 6–3, 3–6.

In February, in his second ATP Tour appearance of the year, Coria defeated Italian qualifier Francesco Aldi, 6–4, 7–5. It was his first ATP victory in 19 months.

As a result of Andy Roddick's withdrawal from the French Open due to a back injury, Coria made his first Grand Slam appearance since the 2006 US Open, taking the place of the American. He faced Tommy Robredo, the three-time quarterfinalist and 12th seed, in the first round. Coria was defeated in four sets, 7–5, 4–6, 1–6, 4–6, but Coria's performance led to some optimism, even from Coria himself, who was close to forcing a fifth set.

Coria never recovered from the service yips that damaged his game and kept his ranking hundreds of places below his once consistent top-ten position. On 28 April 2009, he announced his retirement from professional tennis, saying that he "didn’t feel like competing anymore."

== Playing style ==
Coria was a very well-rounded player who had an excellent technique. He was known as a very solid baseliner and an excellent clay-courter. He had excellent speed, making him one of the best defenders on the tour, and he was able to hit good shots on the run. He had penetrating and balanced groundstroke capabilities and frequently utilised drop shots. His comparatively weak serve was especially noted during the late stages of his career, where Coria would make numerous double faults due to service yips, often resorting to hitting a severely underpowered second serve to avoid this. Whilst his small size and relative lack of power meant he did not have any big, stand-out weapons, Coria had excellent consistency and court craft which enabled him to become a top player, especially on clay courts.

Coria ranks highly in several all-time return leaderboards in men's tennis, including breakpoint conversion percentage at 45.71%, ahead of Rafael Nadal (45.15%) and Sergi Bruguera (44.95%). He also ranks first in first-serve return points won at 36.05%, ahead of Nadal (34.05%) and David Ferrer (33.65%), and in return games won at 35.26%, ahead of Nadal (33.35%) and Novak Djokovic (32.23%). In second-serve return points won, he is ranked 13th.

== Personal life ==
Coria was named after French Open champion and compatriot Guillermo Vilas. He began to play tennis at the age of three, not long after learning how to walk, when his father Oscar, a tennis coach, introduced the game to him. His mother Graciela is a housewife. He was the eldest of three brothers in his family.

Coria attended preschool with David Nalbandian in Argentina (their ages are 12 days apart). He admired Andre Agassi and Marcelo Ríos while growing up. He enjoys playing soccer and he is a well-known River Plate fan. Coria married Carla Francovigh on 27 December 2003. They have a son named Thiago, born on 12 April 2012. A daughter, Delfina, was born on 4 October 2013.

As of 2010, Coria was coaching his younger brother Federico Coria.

As of 2016, Coria has been traveling around Argentina managing the government-funded program "Our Tennis" whose purpose is to promote the sport, and identify and develop talent among children and teens.

== Equipment ==
Coria used the Prince O3 Tour. His racquet was strung with Luxilon Big Banger Original 16 String. His clothing sponsor was Adidas.

== Significant finals ==
=== Grand Slam finals ===
==== Singles: 1 (1 runner-up) ====
Result	Year	Tournament	Surface	Opponent	Score
Loss	2004	French Open	Clay	(Argentina) Gastón Gaudio	6–0, 6–3, 4–6, 1–6, 6–8

=== Masters Series finals ===
==== Singles: 7 (2 titles, 5 runner-ups) ====
Result	Year	Tournament	Surface	Opponent	Score
Loss	2003	Monte-Carlo Masters	Clay	(Spain) Juan Carlos Ferrero	2–6, 2–6
Win	2003	Hamburg Masters	Clay	(Argentina) Agustín Calleri	6–3, 6–4, 6–4
Loss	2004	Miami Masters	Hard	(United States) Andy Roddick	7–6^{(7–2)}, 3–6, 1–6, ret.
Win	2004	Monte-Carlo Masters	Clay	(Germany) Rainer Schüttler	6–2, 6–1, 6–3
Loss	2004	Hamburg Masters	Clay	(Switzerland) Roger Federer	6–4, 4–6, 2–6, 3–6
Loss	2005	Monte-Carlo Masters	Clay	(Spain) Rafael Nadal	3–6, 1–6, 6–0, 5–7
Loss	2005	Italian Open	Clay	(Spain) Rafael Nadal	4–6, 6–3, 3–6, 6–4, 6–7^{(6–8)}

== ATP career finals ==
=== Singles: 20 (9 wins, 11 losses) ===
Legend Grand Slam (0–1) ATP World Tour Finals (0–0) ATP World Tour Masters 1000 (2–5) ATP World Tour 500 Series (2–0) ATP World Tour 250 Series (5–5)	Finals by surface Hard (0–3) Clay (8–7) Grass (0–1) Carpet (1–0)

Result	W/L	Date	Tournament	Surface	Opponent	Score
Win	1.	Feb 2001	Viña del Mar, Chile	Clay	(Argentina) Gastón Gaudio	4–6, 6–2, 7–5
Loss	1.	May 2001	Mallorca, Spain	Clay	(Spain) Alberto Martín	3–6, 6–3, 2–6
Loss	2.	Sep 2002	Costa do Sauipe, Brazil	Hard	(Brazil) Gustavo Kuerten	7–6^{(7–4)}, 5–7, 6–7^{(2–7)}
Loss	3.	Feb 2003	Buenos Aires, Argentina	Clay	(Spain) Carlos Moyá	3–6, 6–4, 4–6
Loss	4.	Apr 2003	Monte-Carlo, Monaco	Clay	(Spain) Juan Carlos Ferrero	2–6, 2–6
Win	2.	May 2003	Hamburg, Germany	Clay	(Argentina) Agustín Calleri	6–3, 6–4, 6–4
Win	3.	Jul 2003	Stuttgart, Germany	Clay	(Spain) Tommy Robredo	6–2, 6–2, 6–1
Win	4.	Jul 2003	Kitzbühel, Austria	Clay	(Chile) Nicolás Massú	6–1, 6–4, 6–2
Win	5.	Jul 2003	Sopot, Poland	Clay	(Spain) David Ferrer	7–5, 6–1
Win	6.	Oct 2003	Basel, Switzerland	Carpet (i)	(Argentina) David Nalbandian	w/o
Win	7.	Feb 2004	Buenos Aires, Argentina	Clay	(Spain) Carlos Moyá	6–4, 6–1
Loss	5.	Apr 2004	Miami, United States	Hard	(United States) Andy Roddick	7–6^{(7–2)}, 3–6, 1–6, ret.
Win	8.	Apr 2004	Monte-Carlo, Monaco	Clay	(Germany) Rainer Schüttler	6–2, 6–1, 6–3
Loss	6.	May 2004	Hamburg, Germany	Clay	(Switzerland) Roger Federer	6–4, 4–6, 2–6, 3–6
Loss	7.	Jun 2004	French Open, Paris	Clay	(Argentina) Gastón Gaudio	6–0, 6–3, 4–6, 1–6, 6–8
Loss	8.	Jun 2004	's-Hertogenbosch, Netherlands	Grass	(France) Michaël Llodra	3–6, 4–6
Loss	9.	Apr 2005	Monte-Carlo, Monaco	Clay	(Spain) Rafael Nadal	3–6, 1–6, 6–0, 5–7
Loss	10.	May 2005	Rome, Italy	Clay	(Spain) Rafael Nadal	4–6, 6–3, 3–6, 6–4, 6–7^{(6–8)}
Win	9.	Jul 2005	Umag, Croatia	Clay	(Spain) Carlos Moyá	6–2, 4–6, 6–2
Loss	11.	Sep 2005	Beijing, China	Hard	(Spain) Rafael Nadal	7–5, 1–6, 2–6

== Performance timelines ==
=== Singles ===
Key
W	F	SF	QF	#R	RR	Q#	DNQ	A	NH

(W) winner; (F) finalist; (SF) semifinalist; (QF) quarterfinalist; (#R) rounds 4, 3, 2, 1; (RR) round-robin stage; (Q#) qualification round; (DNQ) did not qualify; (A) absent; (NH) not held; (SR) strike rate (events won / competed); (W–L) win–loss record.

Tournament	2000	2001	2002	2003	2004	2005	2006	2007	2008	SR	W–L
Grand Slam tournaments
Australian Open	A	2R	A	4R	1R	4R	3R	A	A	0 / 5	9–5
French Open	2R	1R	3R	SF	F	4R	A	A	1R	0 / 7	17–7
Wimbledon	A	1R	A	1R	2R	4R	A	A	A	0 / 4	4–4
US Open	Q1	A	3R	QF	A	QF	1R	A	A	0 / 4	10–4
Win–loss	1–1	1–3	2–2	12–4	7–3	13–4	2–2	0–0	0–1	0 / 20	40–20
Year-end championship
Tennis Masters Cup	Did not qualify			RR	RR	RR	Did not qualify			0 / 3	1–8
National representation
Summer Olympics	A	Not Held			A	Not Held			A	0 / 0	0–0
Davis Cup	A	A	A	A	QF	SF	A	A	A	0 / 2	5–3
ATP Masters 1000
Indian Wells Masters	A	A	A	3R	QF	4R	A	A	A	0 / 3	7–3
Miami Masters	A	3R	3R	4R	F	3R	3R	A	A	0 / 6	13–6
Monte-Carlo Masters	A	SF	1R	F	W	F	QF	A	A	1 / 6	23–5
Rome Masters	A	2R	A	3R	A	F	1R	A	A	0 / 4	8–4
Hamburg Masters	A	A	A	W	F	QF	1R	A	A	1 / 4	14–3
Canada Masters	A	A	A	1R	1R	1R	A	A	A	0 / 3	0–3
Cincinnati Masters	A	1R	2R	QF	A	2R	A	A	A	0 / 4	5–4
Madrid Masters	Not Held		Q1	A	A	3R	A	A	A	0 / 1	1–1
Paris Masters	A	A	1R	3R	A	2R	A	A	A	0 / 3	1–2
Win–loss	0–0	7–4	3–4	21–6	19–4	18–9	4–4	0–0	0–0	2 / 34	72–31
Career statistics
Tournaments Played	4	16	16	21	15	23	14	0	8	117	
Finals	0	2	1	7	6	4	0	0	0	20	
Titles	0	1	0	5	2	1	0	0	0	9	
Hard Win–loss	1–1	3–3	9–8	17–10	12–9	19–14	3–3	0–0	0–0	64–48	
Clay Win–loss	2–3	23–11	13–8	38–5	22–2	30–6	8–11	0–0	2–8	138–54	
Grass Win–loss	0–0	0–1	0–0	0–1	5–3	5–3	0–0	0–0	0–0	10–8	
Carpet Win–loss	0–0	0–0	0–0	5–0	0–0	1–4	0–0	0–0	0–0	6–4	
Overall win–loss	3–4	26–15	22–16	60–16	39–14	55–27	11–14	0–0	2–8	218–114	
Win %	43%	63%	58%	79%	74%	67%	44%	–%	20%	65.66%	
Year-end ranking	88	44	45	5	7	8	116	—	577	$5,817,486	

== Wins over top 10 players ==
Season	2000	2001	2002	2003	2004	2005	2006	2007	2008	2009	Total
Wins	0	0	0	4	5	1	0	0	0	0	10

#	Player	Rank	Event	Surface	Rd	Score
2003
1.	(Argentina) David Nalbandian	9	Buenos Aires, Argentina	Clay	QF	3–6, 6–3, 7–6^{(7–5)}
2.	(Spain) Carlos Moyá	4	Monte-Carlo, Monaco	Clay	SF	7–6^{(7–3)}, 6–2
3.	(United States) Andre Agassi	2	French Open, Paris	Clay	QF	4–6, 6–3, 6–2, 6–4
4.	(Spain) Carlos Moyá	7	Tennis Masters Cup, Houston	Hard	RR	6–2, 6–3
2004
5.	(Spain) Carlos Moyá	7	Buenos Aires, Argentina	Clay	F	6–4, 6–1
6.	(Argentina) David Nalbandian	9	Monte-Carlo, Monaco	Clay	QF	6–4, 6–3
7.	(Germany) Rainer Schüttler	6	Monte-Carlo, Monaco	Clay	F	6–2, 6–1, 6–3
8.	(Spain) Carlos Moyá	5	French Open, Paris	Clay	QF	7–5, 7–6^{(7–3)}, 6–3
9.	(United Kingdom) Tim Henman	9	French Open, Paris	Clay	SF	3–6, 6–4, 6–0, 7–5
2005
10.	(United States) Andre Agassi	9	Rome, Italy	Clay	QF	7–5, 7–6^{(9–7)}
