= 2005 Open de Tenis Comunidad Valenciana – Singles =

Singles
- 2005 Open de Tenis Comunidad Valenciana

Final
- Champion: (Russia) Igor Andreev
- Runner-up: (Spain) David Ferrer
- Score: 6–3, 5–7, 6–3

Details
- Draw: 32
- Seeds: 8

Events
Singles	Doubles
← 2004 ·	Valencia Open	· 2006 →

Igor Andreev defeated David Ferrer in the final, 6–3, 5–7, 6–3 to win the singles tennis title at the 2005 Valencia Open.

Andreev defeated Rafael Nadal en route to the title, in the quarterfinals. This marked Nadal's last defeat on clay before his record 81-match winning streak on the surface, which lasted until the final of the 2007 Hamburg Masters.

== Seeds ==
A champion seed is indicated in bold text while text in italics indicates the round in which that seed was eliminated.

1. (Russia) Nikolay Davydenko (first round)
2. (Chile) Fernando González (quarterfinals)
3. (Spain) Rafael Nadal (quarterfinals)
4. (Belgium) Olivier Rochus (first round)
5. (Spain) David Ferrer (final)
6. (Spain) Fernando Verdasco (quarterfinals)
7. (Russia) **Igor Andreev (champion)**
8. (Denmark) Kenneth Carlsen (first round)

== Draw ==
=== Key ===
- Q = Qualifier
- WC = Wild card
- LL = Lucky loser
- Alt = Alternate
- ITF = ITF entry
- PR = Protected ranking
- SR = Special ranking
- SE = Special exempt
- JE = Junior exempt
- JR = Junior Accelerator Programme entrant
- CO = College Accelerator Programme entrant
- NG = Next Gen Accelerator Program entrant
- w/o = Walkover
- r = Retired
- d = Defaulted

First round
1	(Russia) N Davydenko	6^{2}	**6**	3
(Spain) **Á Costa**	**7^{7}**	1	**6**
WC	(Spain) I Matos Gil	1	3
(Austria) **S Koubek**	**6**	**6**
WC	(Spain) À Corretja	6^{5}	6^{8}
Q	(Italy) **F Luzzi**	**7^{7}**	**7^{10}**
Q	(Germany) M Berrer	1	1
6	(Spain) **F Verdasco**	**6**	**6**
4	(Belgium) O Rochus	2	4
(Brazil) **G Kuerten**	**6**	**6**
(Spain) Montañés	**7^{7}**	4	2
(Spain) **A Martín**	6^{5}	**6**	**6**
(Georgia (country)) **I Labadze**	**7^{7}**	**6**
(Croatia) I Karlović	6^{3}	2
(France) J Benneteau	4	1
5	(Spain) **D Ferrer**	**6**	**6**
7	(Russia) **I Andreev**	**6**	**7**
WC	(Spain) F Vicente	4	5
(Italy) **P Starace**	**7**	**7**
(Spain) Á Calatrava	5	5
(Germany) P Kohlschreiber	4	2
(Spain) **G García López**	**6**	**6**
(Spain) J C Ferrero	2	1
3	(Spain) **R Nadal**	**6**	**6**
8	(Denmark) K Carlsen	4	3
Q	(Spain) **I Navarro**	**6**	**6**
(France) **A Dupuis**	**6**	**7**
Q	(Serbia and Montenegro) N Djokovic	4	5
(Spain) **F Mantilla**	**6**	**6**
(Spain) Ó Hernández	0	2
(Germany) B Phau	3	6^{3}
2	(Chile) **F González**	**6**	**7^{7}**

Second round
(Spain) **Á Costa**	**6**	**6**
(Austria) S Koubek	4	2
Q	(Italy) F Luzzi	2	0
6	(Spain) **F Verdasco**	**6**	**6**
(Brazil) G Kuerten	2	0
(Spain) **A Martín**	**6**	**6**
(Georgia (country)) I Labadze	3	4
5	(Spain) **D Ferrer**	**6**	**6**
7	(Russia) **I Andreev**	**7**	**6**
(Italy) P Starace	5	1
(Spain) G García López	1	4
3	(Spain) **R Nadal**	**6**	**6**
Q	(Spain) **I Navarro**	1	**6**	**6**
(France) A Dupuis	**6**	4	3
(Spain) F Mantilla	4	1
2	(Chile) **F González**	**6**	**6**

Quarterfinals
(Spain) **Á Costa**	6^{4}	**7**	**6**
6	(Spain) F Verdasco	**7^{7}**	5	1
(Spain) A Martín	1	4
5	(Spain) **D Ferrer**	**6**	**6**
7	(Russia) **I Andreev**	**7**	**6**
3	(Spain) R Nadal	5	2
Q	(Spain) **I Navarro**	6^{5}	**6**	**6**
2	(Chile) F González	**7^{7}**	4	4

Semifinals
(Spain) Á Costa	3	3
5	(Spain) **D Ferrer**	**6**	**6**
7	(Russia) **I Andreev**	**7^{7}**	**6**
Q	(Spain) I Navarro	6^{3}	2

Final
5	(Spain) David Ferrer	3	**7**	3
7	(Russia) **Igor Andreev**	**6**	5	**6**
