= 2009 Valencia Open 500 – Singles =

Singles
- 2009 Valencia Open 500

Final
- Champion: (United Kingdom) Andy Murray
- Runner-up: (Russia) Mikhail Youzhny
- Score: 6–3, 6–2

Details
- Draw: 32
- Seeds: 8

Events
Singles	Doubles
← 2008 ·	Valencia Open	· 2010 →

David Ferrer was the defending champion, but withdrew from his second round match due to a hamstring injury.
Andy Murray won in the final 6–3, 6–2, against Mikhail Youzhny.

== Seeds ==
1. (United Kingdom) Andy Murray (champion)
2. (Russia) Nikolay Davydenko (semifinals)
3. (France) Jo-Wilfried Tsonga (first round, retired due to a left wrist injury)
4. (Spain) Fernando Verdasco (semifinals)
5. (France) Gilles Simon (quarterfinals)
6. (France) Gaël Monfils (second round)
7. (Spain) Tommy Robredo (quarterfinals)
8. (Spain) David Ferrer (second round, withdrew due to a hamstring injury)

== Draw ==
=== Key ===
- Q = Qualifier
- WC = Wild card
- LL = Lucky loser
- Alt = Alternate
- SE = Special exempt
- PR = Protected ranking
- ITF = ITF entry
- JE = Junior exempt
- w/o = Walkover
- r = Retired
- d = Defaulted
- SR = Special ranking

=== Finals ===
Semifinals
1	(United Kingdom) Andy Murray	6	2	6
4	(Spain) Fernando Verdasco	3	6	3
(Russia) Mikhail Youzhny	3	6	6
2	(Russia) Nikolay Davydenko	6	4	3

Final
1	(United Kingdom) Andy Murray	6	6
(Russia) Mikhail Youzhny	3	2

=== Top half ===
First round
1	(United Kingdom) A Murray	6	6
WC	(Spain) D Gimeno Traver	3	1
(Argentina) L Mayer	6	6
(Russia) I Andreev	3	3
(Spain) A Montañés	6	3	6
Q	(Spain) R Bautista Agut	1	6	4
(Spain) N Almagro	5	7^{7}	2
8	(Spain) D Ferrer	7	6^{3}	6
4	(Spain) F Verdasco	6	0
WC	(Spain) Ó Hernández	1	1^{r}
(Serbia) J Tipsarević	6	6
(Romania) V Hănescu	4	3
Q	(Spain) A Martín	5	3
(Spain) F López	7	6
Q	(Belgium) C Rochus	0	7	3
7	(Spain) T Robredo	6	5	6

Second round
1	(United Kingdom) A Murray	6	3	6
(Argentina) L Mayer	4	6	3
(Spain) A Montañés	w/o
8	(Spain) D Ferrer
4	(Spain) F Verdasco	6	6
(Serbia) J Tipsarević	3	3
(Spain) F López	6	3	4
7	(Spain) T Robredo	4	6	6

Quarterfinals
1	(United Kingdom) A Murray	6	6
(Spain) A Montañés	4	2
4	(Spain) F Verdasco	6	6
7	(Spain) T Robredo	3	2

Semifinals
1	(United Kingdom) A Murray	6	2	6
4	(Spain) F Verdasco	3	6	3

=== Bottom half ===
First round
5	(France) G Simon	6	6
(Russia) I Kunitsyn	3	2
(Czech Republic) T Berdych	6	6
(France) P-H Mathieu	3	4
(Spain) JC Ferrero	6	6^{4}	3
(Uruguay) P Cuevas	2	7^{7}	6
(Russia) M Youzhny	6^{3}	6	3
3	(France) J-W Tsonga	7^{7}	0	0^{r}
6	(France) G Monfils	6	6
WC	(Spain) M Granollers	4	2
(Spain) G García López	7	6
(Germany) S Greul	5	2
(Argentina) J Mónaco	6	6
(Argentina) M Vassallo Argüello	3	2
Q	(Colombia) A Falla	2	1
2	(Russia) N Davydenko	6	6

Second round
5	(France) G Simon	6	4	6
(Czech Republic) T Berdych	4	6	3
(Uruguay) P Cuevas	2	6	1
(Russia) M Youzhny	6	2	6
6	(France) G Monfils	2	5
(Spain) G García López	6	7
(Argentina) J Mónaco	3	5
2	(Russia) N Davydenko	6	7

Quarterfinals
5	(France) G Simon	4	4
(Russia) M Youzhny	6	6
(Spain) G García López	4	6^{3}
2	(Russia) N Davydenko	6	7^{7}

Semifinals
(Russia) M Youzhny	3	6	6
2	(Russia) N Davydenko	6	4	3

== Qualifying ==
=== Seeds ===
1. (United States) Robert Kendrick (qualifying competition)
2. (Belgium) Christophe Rochus (qualified)
3. (Colombia) Alejandro Falla (qualified)
4. (United States) Rajeev Ram (qualifying competition)
5. (Spain) Alberto Martín (qualified)
6. (Belgium) Steve Darcis (first round)
7. (Spain) Iván Navarro (qualifying competition)
8. (Spain) Albert Ramos Viñolas (qualifying competition)

=== Qualifiers ===
1. (Spain) Roberto Bautista Agut
2. (Belgium) Christophe Rochus
3. (Colombia) Alejandro Falla
4. (Spain) Alberto Martín

=== Draw ===
==== First qualifier ====
First round
1	(United States) Robert Kendrick	6	6
WC	(Spain) Pablo García Gaitán	1	0
(Spain) Roberto Bautista Agut	7^{7}	7
6	(Belgium) Steve Darcis	6^{2}	5

Qualifying competition
1	(United States) Robert Kendrick	6^{8}	6^{4}
(Spain) Roberto Bautista Agut	7^{10}	7^{7}

==== Second qualifier ====
First round
2	(Belgium) Christophe Rochus	6	6
WC	(Spain) Arnau Sanz Sanz	1	0
Alt	(Spain) Óscar Burrieza	4	3
8	(Spain) Albert Ramos Viñolas	6	6

Qualifying competition
2	(Belgium) Christophe Rochus	6	7
8	(Spain) Albert Ramos Viñolas	1	5

==== Third qualifier ====
First round
3	(Colombia) Alejandro Falla	2	6	7
(Spain) Daniel Muñoz de la Nava	6	3	5
Alt	(United Kingdom) Morgan Phillips	1	1
7	(Spain) Iván Navarro	6	6

Qualifying competition
3	(Colombia) Alejandro Falla	6	6
7	(Spain) Iván Navarro	4	2

==== Fourth qualifier ====
First round
4	(United States) Rajeev Ram	7^{7}	6
WC	(Spain) Javier Martí	6^{0}	2
WC	(Spain) Pedro Rico	6	0	4
5	(Spain) Alberto Martín	3	6	6

Qualifying competition
4	(United States) Rajeev Ram	5	6^{4}
5	(Spain) Alberto Martín	7	7^{7}
