= 2006 Open de Tenis Comunidad Valenciana – Singles =

Singles
- 2006 Open de Tenis Comunidad Valenciana

Final
- Champion: (Spain) Nicolás Almagro
- Runner-up: (France) Gilles Simon
- Score: 6–2, 6–3

Details
- Draw: 32
- Seeds: 8

Events
Singles	Doubles
← 2005 ·	Valencia Open	· 2007 →

Nicolás Almagro defeated Gilles Simon 6–2, 6–3 to win the 2006 Open de Tenis Comunidad Valenciana singles event.

== Seeds ==
1. (Russia) Nikolay Davydenko (first round)
2. (Argentina) Gastón Gaudio (quarterfinals)
3. (Spain) David Ferrer (first round, retired because of a back injury)
4. (Spain) Juan Carlos Ferrero (first round)
5. (Russia) Igor Andreev (first round)
6. (Italy) Filippo Volandri (quarterfinals)
7. (Spain) Fernando Verdasco (semifinals)
8. (Russia) ~~Dmitry Tursunov~~ (withdrew)

== Draws ==
=== Key ===
- Q - Qualifier
- WC - Wildcard
- LL - Lucky loser
- r - Retired

=== Finals ===
Semifinals					Finals
7	(Spain) Fernando Verdasco	2	6^{5}
	(France) Gilles Simon	6	7^{7}			(France) Gilles Simon	2	3
Q	(Spain) Nicolás Almagro	6	2	6	Q	(Spain) Nicolás Almagro	6	6
WC	(Russia) Marat Safin	2	6	4

=== Section 1 ===
First round
1	(Russia) N Davydenko	5	5
(Czech Republic) J Hernych	7	7
(Spain) G García-López	6	6
(Spain) F López	3	3
(Italy) P Starace	6	6
(Czech Republic) L Dlouhý	3	3
(Spain) A Martín	3	4
7	(Spain) F Verdasco	6	6
3	(Spain) D Ferrer	6^{1}	r
Q	(France) T Ascione	7^{7}
(Spain) R Ramírez Hidalgo	2	2
(Italy) A Seppi	6	6
(France) G Simon	6	6
(Czech Republic) R Vik	3	2
(Italy) D Sanguinetti	6^{4}	6	6
LL	(Russia) T Gabashvili	7^{7}	4	3

Second round
(Czech Republic) J Hernych	2	4
(Spain) G García-López	6	6
(Italy) P Starace	3	6^{4}
7	(Spain) F Verdasco	6	7^{7}
Q	(France) T Ascione	6	1	2
(Italy) A Seppi	1	6	6
(France) G Simon	3	7	6
(Italy) D Sanguinetti	6	5	3

Quarterfinals
(Spain) G García-López	7^{7}	4	3
7	(Spain) F Verdasco	6^{2}	6	6
(Italy) A Seppi	6^{2}	6^{4}
(France) G Simon	7^{7}	7^{7}

Semifinals
7	(Spain) F Verdasco	2	6^{5}
(France) G Simon	6	7^{7}

=== Section 2 ===
First round
6	(Italy) F Volandri	6	6
Q	(Spain) A Portas	0	1
(Czech Republic) T Zíb	7	6
(Romania) A Pavel	5	3
Q	(Spain) G Fraile	6^{1}	6	2
(Germany) B Phau	7^{7}	6^{4}	6
Q	(Spain) N Almagro	6^{3}	6	6
4	(Spain) JC Ferrero	7^{7}	4	4
5	(Russia) I Andreev	6^{6}	4
WC	(Russia) M Safin	7^{8}	6
WC	(Spain) A Costa	6	3	4
(Serbia and Montenegro) B Pašanski	3	6	6
(Germany) F Mayer	6	6
WC	(Spain) G Burniol	0	3
(Netherlands) R Sluiter	6^{6}	6^{3}
2	(Argentina) G Gaudio	7^{8}	7^{7}

Second round
6	(Italy) F Volandri	6	6
(Czech Republic) T Zíb	4	4
(Germany) B Phau	2	1
Q	(Spain) N Almagro	6	6
WC	(Russia) M Safin	6	6
(Serbia and Montenegro) B Pašanski	2	2
(Germany) F Mayer	6	6
2	(Argentina) G Gaudio	4	2

Quarterfinals
6	(Italy) F Volandri	4	1
Q	(Spain) N Almagro	6	6
WC	(Russia) M Safin	6	6
2	(Argentina) G Gaudio	4	4

Semifinals
Q	(Spain) N Almagro	6	2	6
WC	(Russia) M Safin	2	6	4
