= 2007 Open de Tenis Comunidad Valenciana – Singles =

Singles
- 2007 Open de Tenis Comunidad Valenciana

Final
- Champion: (Spain) Nicolás Almagro
- Runner-up: (Italy) Potito Starace
- Score: 4–6, 6–2, 6–1

Details
- Draw: 32
- Seeds: 16

Events
| Singles | Doubles |
| ← 2006 · | Valencia Open | · 2008 → |

Nicolás Almagro was the defending champion and defeated Potito Starace 4–6, 6–2, 6–1 to win the 2007 Open de Tenis Comunidad Valenciana singles event.

== Seeds ==
1. (Spain) ~~David Ferrer~~ (withdrew)
2. (Spain) Juan Carlos Ferrero (second round)
3. (Spain) Nicolás Almagro (champion)
4. (Spain) Fernando Verdasco (first round)
5. (France) Gilles Simon (second round)
6. (Germany) Florian Mayer (first round)
7. (Italy) Filippo Volandri (quarterfinals, retired)
8. (Spain) Guillermo García López (first round)

== Draws ==
=== Key ===
- Q - Qualifier
- WC - Wildcard
- LL - Lucky loser
- r - Retired

=== Finals ===
| Semifinals | | | | | Finals |
| LL | (Spain) I Navarro | 7^{7} | 0 | 5 |
| | (Italy) P Starace | 6^{2} | 6 | 7 | | (Italy) P Starace | 6 | 2 | 1 |
| 3 | (Spain) N Almagro | 6^{6} | 6 | 6 | 3 | (Spain) N Almagro | 4 | 6 | 6 |
| WC | (Spain) S Ventura | 7^{8} | 4 | 4 |

=== Section 1 ===
First round
LL | (Spain) I Navarro | 6 | 6
(Italy) D Bracciali | 3 | 1
WC | (United Kingdom) J Ward | 7^{7} | 4 | 3
Q | (France) A Gensse | 6^{2} | 6 | 6
(Czech Republic) J Hernych | 5 | 6^{7}
(Argentina) S Roitman | 7 | 7^{9}
(Russia) E Korolev | 6 | 1 | 6
8 | (Spain) G García López | 3 | 6 | 3
4 | (Spain) F Verdasco | 1 | 6 | 3
(Italy) P Starace | 6 | 4 | 6
Q | (Spain) P Andújar | 6 | 6
(Germany) S Greul | 2 | 4
Q | (Spain) M Granollers-Pujol | 2 | 6 | 6
(Denmark) K Pless | 6 | 3 | 3
(Russia) T Gabashvili | 6 | 3 | 2
5 | (France) G Simon | 4 | 6 | 6

Second round
LL | (Spain) I Navarro | 7^{13} | 6
Q | (France) A Gensse | 6^{11} | 4
(Argentina) S Roitman | 6 | 5 | 0
(Russia) E Korolev | 1 | 7 | 6
(Italy) P Starace | 6 | 1 | 6
Q | (Spain) P Andújar | 4 | 6 | 3
Q | (Spain) M Granollers-Pujol | 6 | 4 | 6
5 | (France) G Simon | 3 | 6 | 1

Quarterfinals
LL | (Spain) I Navarro | 6 | 6
(Russia) E Korolev | 3 | 1
(Italy) P Starace | 6 | 6
Q | (Spain) M Granollers-Pujol | 4 | 4

Semifinals
LL | (Spain) I Navarro | 7^{7} | 0 | 5
(Italy) P Starace | 6^{2} | 6 | 7

=== Section 2 ===
First round
7 | (Italy) F Volandri | 6 | 7^{10}
WC | (Russia) I Andreev | 4 | 6^{8}
(Spain) Ó Hernández | 6^{5} | 4
(Austria) S Koubek | 7^{7} | 6
Q | (Spain) M Fornell | 4 | 7^{7} | 3
(Italy) A di Mauro | 6 | 6^{5} | 6
(Czech Republic) J Hájek | 2 | 1
3 | (Spain) N Almagro | 6 | 6
6 | (Germany) F Mayer | 3 | 3
WC | (Spain) S Ventura | 6 | 6
(Colombia) A Falla | 6 | 6
(Italy) A Seppi | 3 | 4
(Spain) A Martín | 6 | 3 | 6
(Spain) F López | 2 | 6 | 2
(Latvia) E Gulbis | 3 | 1
2 | (Spain) JC Ferrero | 6 | 6

Second round
7 | (Italy) F Volandri | 6 | 1
(Austria) S Koubek | 4 | 0^{r}
(Italy) A di Mauro | 5 | 2
3 | (Spain) N Almagro | 7 | 6
WC | (Spain) S Ventura | 7 | 6^{6} | 6
(Colombia) A Falla | 5 | 7^{8} | 4
(Spain) A Martín | 6 | 6
2 | (Spain) JC Ferrero | 4 | 2

Quarterfinals
7 | (Italy) F Volandri | 3 | 0^{r}
3 | (Spain) N Almagro | 6 | 1
WC | (Spain) S Ventura | 1 | 7^{7} | 6
(Spain) A Martín | 6 | 6^{2} | 4

Semifinals
3 | (Spain) N Almagro | 6^{6} | 6 | 6
WC | (Spain) S Ventura | 7^{8} | 4 | 4
