= 2008 Open de Tenis Comunidad Valenciana – Doubles =

Doubles
- 2008 Open de Tenis Comunidad Valenciana

Final
- Champions: (Argentina) Máximo González (Argentina) Juan Mónaco
- Runners-up: (United States) Travis Parrott (Slovakia) Filip Polášek
- Score: 7–5, 7–5

Details
- Draw: 16
- Seeds: 4

Events
Singles	Doubles
← 2007 ·	Valencia Open	· 2009 →

Wesley Moodie and Todd Perry were the defending champions, but chose not to participate that year.

Máximo González and Juan Mónaco won in the final 7–5, 7–5, against Travis Parrott and Filip Polášek.

== Seeds ==
1. (Germany) Christopher Kas / (Netherlands) Rogier Wassen (quarterfinals)
2. (Thailand) Sanchai Ratiwatana / (Thailand) Sonchat Ratiwatana (first round)
3. (Czech Republic) Jaroslav Levinský / (Czech Republic) David Škoch (quarterfinals)
4. (Peru) Luis Horna / (Spain) Santiago Ventura (quarterfinals, withdrew due to a lower back injury for Ventura)

== Draw ==
=== Key ===
- Q = Qualifier
- WC = Wild card
- LL = Lucky loser
- Alt = Alternate
- SE = Special exempt
- PR = Protected ranking
- ITF = ITF entry
- JE = Junior exempt
- w/o = Walkover
- r = Retired
- d = Defaulted
- SR = Special ranking

=== Draw ===
First round
1	(Germany) C Kas (Netherlands) R Wassen	6	6
(Australia) S Huss (United Kingdom) R Hutchins	3	2
(United States) T Parrott (Slovakia) F Polášek	6	6^{6}	[10]
WC	(Austria) A Bisevac (Spain) A Vivanco-Guzmán	2	7^{8}	[6]
3	(Czech Republic) J Levinský (Czech Republic) D Škoch	6	6
(United Kingdom) J Auckland (United Kingdom) J Delgado	4	2
(Austria) W Eschauer (Russia) E Korolev	6^{6}	3
(Czech Republic) T Cibulec (Germany) M Zverev	7^{8}	6
(Spain) N Almagro (Spain) I Navarro	6^{5}	6	[10]
(Argentina) L Arnold Ker (Italy) P Starace	7^{7}	4	[7]
(Spain) G García López (Spain) A Montañés	4	1
4	(Peru) L Horna (Spain) S Ventura	6	6
(Argentina) M González (Argentina) J Mónaco	6	6
WC	(Spain) P Andújar (Spain) R Bautista Agut	3	2
(Sweden) J Brunström (United States) J Cerretani	6	7^{7}
2	(Thailand) Sa Ratiwatana (Thailand) So Ratiwatana	4	6^{4}

Quarterfinals
1	(Germany) C Kas (Netherlands) R Wassen	6^{5}	6	[8]
(United States) T Parrott (Slovakia) F Polášek	7^{7}	0	[10]
3	(Czech Republic) J Levinský (Czech Republic) D Škoch	3	7	[5]
(Czech Republic) T Cibulec (Germany) M Zverev	6	5	[10]
(Spain) N Almagro (Spain) I Navarro	w/o
4	(Peru) L Horna (Spain) S Ventura
(Argentina) M González (Argentina) J Mónaco	6	6^{5}	[10]
(Sweden) J Brunström (United States) J Cerretani	2	7^{7}	[8]

Semifinals
(United States) T Parrott (Slovakia) F Polášek	6	6
(Czech Republic) T Cibulec (Germany) M Zverev	3	3
(Spain) N Almagro (Spain) I Navarro	3	3
(Argentina) M González (Argentina) J Mónaco	6	6

Final
(United States) T Parrott (Slovakia) F Polášek	5	5
(Argentina) M González (Argentina) J Mónaco	7	7
