= 2003 CAM Open Comunidad Valenciana – Singles =

Singles
- 2003 CAM Open Comunidad Valenciana

Final
- Champion: (Spain) Juan Carlos Ferrero
- Runner-up: (Belgium) Christophe Rochus
- Score: 6–2, 6–4

Details
- Draw: 32
- Seeds: 8

Events
Singles	Doubles
- Valencia Open

Gastón Gaudio was the defending champion but lost in the quarterfinals to Flávio Saretta.

Juan Carlos Ferrero won in the final 6–2, 6–4 against Christophe Rochus.

== Seeds ==
A champion seed is indicated in bold text while text in italics indicates the round in which that seed was eliminated.

1. (Spain) **Juan Carlos Ferrero (champion)**
2. (Russia) Marat Safin (first round)
3. (Spain) Àlex Corretja (first round)
4. (Argentina) Gastón Gaudio (quarterfinals)
5. (Argentina) Agustín Calleri (quarterfinals)
6. (Argentina) Mariano Zabaleta (first round)
7. (Argentina) José Acasuso (first round)
8. (Spain) David Sánchez (second round)

== Draw ==
Key

- Q = Qualifier
- WC = Wild card
- LL = Lucky loser
- Alt = Alternate
- ITF = ITF entry
- PR = Protected ranking
- SR = Special ranking
- SE = Special exempt
- JE = Junior exempt
- JR = Junior Accelerator Programme entrant
- CO = College Accelerator Programme entrant
- NG = Next Gen Accelerator Program entrant
- w/o = Walkover
- r = Retired
- d = Defaulted

First round
1	(Spain) **J C Ferrero**	**6**	**6**
WC	(Spain) G García-López	4	4
(Spain) **A Portas**	**6**	**6**
(Slovakia) K Beck	2	2
(Slovakia) **D Hrbatý**	**7**	4	**7**
(Sweden) M Norman	5	**6**	5
(Russia) I Kunitsyn	4	0
5	(Argentina) **A Calleri**	**6**	**6**
4	(Argentina) **G Gaudio**	**6**	**6**
(Brazil) A Sá	1	1
Q	(Spain) Á Calatrava	3	1
(Spain) **G Blanco**	**6**	**6**
Q	(Spain) F Verdasco	6^{7}	0
Q	(Czech Republic) **F Čermák**	**7^{9}**	**6**
(Brazil) **F Saretta**	**6**	**6**
6	(Argentina) M Zabaleta	1	3
8	(Spain) **D Sánchez**	3	**6**	**6**
Q	(France) O Patience	**6**	4	2
(Spain) A Martín	2	6^{4}
(Chile) **N Massú**	**6**	**7^{7}**
(Spain) F López	6^{1}	**6**	3
(Spain) **F Vicente**	**7^{7}**	3	**6**
(France) **A Dupuis**	5	**6**	**6**
WC/3	(Spain) À Corretja	**7**	3	4
7	(Argentina) J Acasuso	4	6^{7}
(Austria) **M Hipfl**	**6**	**7^{9}**
(Spain) A Montañés	**6**	6^{3}	2
(Belgium) **C Rochus**	3	**7^{7}**	**6**
(Armenia) **S Sargsian**	**6**	**6**
(Spain) D Ferrer	4	1
(Argentina) **F Squillari**	**6**	5	**6**
WC/2	(Russia) M Safin	4	**7**	2

Second round
1	(Spain) **J C Ferrero**	**6**	**6**
(Spain) A Portas	4	4
(Slovakia) D Hrbatý	1	**7**	2
5	(Argentina) **A Calleri**	**6**	5	**6**
4	(Argentina) **G Gaudio**	3	**6**	**6**
(Spain) G Blanco	**6**	4	4
Q	(Czech Republic) F Čermák	6^{3}	4
(Brazil) **F Saretta**	**7^{7}**	**6**
8	(Spain) D Sánchez	4	3
(Chile) **N Massú**	**6**	**6**
(Spain) **F Vicente**	6^{6}	**6**	**6**
(France) A Dupuis	**7^{8}**	1	3
(Austria) M Hipfl	4	0
(Belgium) **C Rochus**	**6**	**6**
(Armenia) **S Sargsian**	**7**	3	**6**
(Argentina) F Squillari	5	**6**	3

Quarterfinals
1	(Spain) **J C Ferrero**	**6**	**6**
5	(Argentina) A Calleri	3	4
4	(Argentina) G Gaudio	**6**	6^{3}	3
(Brazil) **F Saretta**	4	**7^{7}**	**6**
(Chile) N Massú	3	4
(Spain) **F Vicente**	**6**	**6**
(Belgium) **C Rochus**	**6**	**6**
(Armenia) S Sargsian	2	2

Semifinals
1	(Spain) **J C Ferrero**	**7^{7}**	**6**
(Brazil) F Saretta	6^{3}	2
(Spain) F Vicente	3	2
(Belgium) **C Rochus**	**6**	**6**

Final
1	(Spain) **Juan Carlos Ferrero**	**6**	**6**
(Belgium) Christophe Rochus	2	4
