= 2007 Open de Tenis Comunidad Valenciana – Doubles =

Doubles
- 2007 Open de Tenis Comunidad Valenciana

Final
- Champions: (South Africa) Wesley Moodie (Australia) Todd Perry
- Runners-up: (Switzerland) Yves Allegro (Argentina) Sebastián Prieto
- Score: 7–5, 7–5

Details
- Draw: 16
- Seeds: 4

Events
Singles	Doubles
← 2006 ·	Valencia Open	· 2008 →

David Škoch and Tomáš Zíb were the defending champions, but did not participate together this year. Skoch partnered Jordan Kerr, losing in the first round. Zib did not participate this year.

Wesley Moodie and Todd Perry won in the final 7–5, 7–5, against Yves Allegro and Sebastián Prieto.

== Seeds ==
1. ~~(Sweden) Simon Aspelin / (Austria) Julian Knowle~~ (withdrew)
2. (Czech Republic) František Čermák / (Czech Republic) Leoš Friedl (first round)
3. (Switzerland) Yves Allegro / (Argentina) Sebastián Prieto (final)
4. (South Africa) Wesley Moodie / (Australia) Todd Perry (champions)
5. (Germany) Michael Kohlmann / (Sweden) Robert Lindstedt (first round)

== Draw ==
=== Key ===
- Q = Qualifier
- WC = Wild card
- LL = Lucky loser
- Alt = Alternate
- SE = Special exempt
- PR = Protected ranking
- ITF = ITF entry
- JE = Junior exempt
- w/o = Walkover
- r = Retired
- d = Defaulted
- SR = Special ranking

=== Draw ===
First round
5	(Germany) M Kohlmann (Sweden) R Lindstedt	3	7^{7}	[7]
(United States) E Butorac (United Kingdom) J Murray	6	6^{2}	[10]
(Germany) T Behrend (Netherlands) R Wassen	6	3	[10]
(Australia) J Kerr (Czech Republic) D Škoch	1	6	[4]
4	(South Africa) W Moodie (Australia) T Perry	6^{5}	6	[11]
Alt	(Latvia) E Gulbis (Netherlands) M van Haasteren	7^{7}	3	[9]
(Czech Republic) T Cibulec (Argentina) S Roitman	6	6
WC	(Spain) P Andújar (Spain) Ó Hernández	1	1
(Russia) T Gabashvili (France) G Simon	6	6
WC	(Spain) I Navarro Pastor (Spain) A Portas	3	4
(Italy) A Seppi (Italy) F Volandri	3	6	[8]
3	(Switzerland) Y Allegro (Argentina) S Prieto	6	3	[10]
Alt	(Italy) A di Mauro (Costa Rica) JA Marín	6	3	[3]
(Germany) F Mayer (Denmark) K Pless	4	6	[10]
(Spain) N Almagro (Spain) M Granollers Pujol	6	6
2	(Czech Republic) F Čermák (Czech Republic) L Friedl	1	3

Quarterfinals
(United States) E Butorac (United Kingdom) J Murray	3	6^{3}
(Germany) T Behrend (Netherlands) R Wassen	6	7^{7}
4	(South Africa) W Moodie (Australia) T Perry	6	6
(Czech Republic) T Cibulec (Argentina) S Roitman	2	3
(Russia) T Gabashvili (France) G Simon	6	1	[6]
3	(Switzerland) Y Allegro (Argentina) S Prieto	2	6	[10]
(Germany) F Mayer (Denmark) K Pless	w/o
(Spain) N Almagro (Spain) M Granollers Pujol

Semifinals
(Germany) T Behrend (Netherlands) R Wassen	2	6^{7}
4	(South Africa) W Moodie (Australia) T Perry	6	7^{9}
3	(Switzerland) Y Allegro (Argentina) S Prieto	6	6
(Germany) F Mayer (Denmark) K Pless	4	0

Final
4	(South Africa) W Moodie (Australia) T Perry	7	7
3	(Switzerland) Y Allegro (Argentina) S Prieto	5	5
