= 2008 Open de Tenis Comunidad Valenciana =

- Date: 12 – 20 April
- Edition: 14th
- Category: International Series
- Draw: 32S / 16D
- Prize money: €349,000
- Surface: Clay / outdoor
- Location: Valencia, Spain
- Venue: Club de Tenis Valencia

Champions

Singles
- (Spain) David Ferrer

Doubles
- (Argentina) Máximo González / (Argentina) Juan Mónaco
← 2007 ·	Valencia Open	· 2009 →

The 2008 Open de Tenis Comunidad Valenciana was a men's tennis tournament played on outdoor clay courts. It was the 14th edition of the Open de Tenis Comunidad Valenciana, and was part of the International Series of the 2008 ATP Tour. It took place at the Club de Tenis Valencia in Valencia, Spain, from 12 April through 20 April 2008.

The singles field featured ATP No. 5, 2007 Tennis Masters Cup runner-up and Australian Open quarterfinalist David Ferrer, Viña del Mar runner-up Juan Mónaco, and 2007 Metz titlist Tommy Robredo. Other players competing were Auckland finalist Juan Carlos Ferrero, Costa do Sauípe and Acapulco champion Nicolás Almagro, Igor Andreev, Fernando Verdasco and Potito Starace.

First-seeded David Ferrer won the singles title.

== Finals ==
=== Singles ===
(Spain) David Ferrer defeated (Spain) Nicolás Almagro, 4–6, 6–2, 7–6^{(7–2)}

- It was David Ferrer's 1st title of the year, and his 6th overall.

=== Doubles ===
(Argentina) Máximo González / (Argentina) Juan Mónaco defeated (United States) Travis Parrott / (Slovakia) Filip Polášek, 7–5, 7–5
