= 2004 Open de Tenis Comunidad Valenciana – Doubles =

Doubles
- 2004 Open de Tenis Comunidad Valenciana

Final
- Champions: (Argentina) Gastón Etlis (Argentina) Martín Rodríguez
- Runners-up: (Spain) Feliciano López (Spain) Marc López
- Score: 7–5, 7–6^{(7–5)}

Details
- Draw: 16
- Seeds: 4

Events
Singles	Doubles
← 2003 ·	Valencia Open	· 2005 →

Lucas Arnold and Mariano Hood were the defending champions but only Hood competed that year with Sebastián Prieto.

Gastón Etlis and Martín Rodríguez won in the final 7–5, 7–6^{(7–5)} against Feliciano López and Marc López.

== Seeds ==
Champion seeds are indicated in bold text while text in italics indicates the round in which those seeds were eliminated.

1. (Argentina) **Gastón Etlis** / (Argentina) **Martín Rodríguez (champions)**
2. (Argentina) Mariano Hood / (Argentina) Sebastián Prieto (first round)
3. (Austria) Julian Knowle / (Brazil) André Sá (first round)
4. (Australia) Paul Hanley / (Israel) Harel Levy (first round)

== Draw ==
=== Key ===
- Q = Qualifier
- WC = Wild card
- LL = Lucky loser
- Alt = Alternate
- ITF = ITF entry
- PR = Protected ranking
- SR = Special ranking
- SE = Special exempt
- JE = Junior exempt
- JR = Junior Accelerator Programme entrant
- CO = College Accelerator Programme entrant
- NG = Next Gen Accelerator Program entrant
- w/o = Walkover
- r = Retired
- d = Defaulted

First round
1	(Argentina) **G Etlis** (Argentina) **M Rodríguez**	**7^{7}**	**6**
(Spain) À Corretja (Spain) A Martín	6^{5}	2
(Germany) **K Braasch** (Czech Republic) **J Levinský**	**6**	**6**
(Spain) E Benfele Álvarez (Croatia) I Ljubičić	3	1
3	(Austria) J Knowle (Brazil) A Sá	**6**	3	2
(Russia) **I Andreev** (Spain) **D Sánchez**	4	**6**	**6**
(Croatia) **M Ančić** (Netherlands) **D van Scheppingen**	**7^{7}**	**6**
WC	(Spain) D Gimeno-Traver (Spain) J Giner	6^{3}	0
(Spain) **F López** (Spain) **M López**	**6**	**7^{7}**
(United States) G Oliver (United States) T Parrott	3	6^{3}
(Spain) **D Ferrer** (Spain) **R Ramírez Hidalgo**	**6**	5	**6**
4	(Australia) P Hanley (Israel) H Levy	4	**7**	3
(Spain) J I Carrasco (Spain) Á López Morón	**7^{7}**	6^{5}	3
(Spain) **Ó Hernández** (Spain) **A Portas**	6^{5}	**7^{7}**	**6**
WC	(Spain) **N Almagro** (Spain) **Á Calatrava**	**7^{7}**	3	**6**
2	(Argentina) M Hood (Argentina) S Prieto	6^{4}	**6**	4

Quarterfinals
1	(Argentina) **G Etlis** (Argentina) **M Rodríguez**	**6**	**6**
(Germany) K Braasch (Czech Republic) J Levinský	1	1
(Russia) **I Andreev** (Spain) **D Sánchez**	w/o
(Croatia) M Ančić (Netherlands) D van Scheppingen
(Spain) **F López** (Spain) **M López**	**7**	**6**
(Spain) D Ferrer (Spain) R Ramírez Hidalgo	5	4
(Spain) Ó Hernández (Spain) A Portas	3	2
WC	(Spain) **N Almagro** (Spain) **Á Calatrava**	**6**	**6**

Semifinals
1	(Argentina) **G Etlis** (Argentina) **M Rodríguez**	**6**	**6**
(Russia) I Andreev (Spain) D Sánchez	3	2
(Spain) **F López** (Spain) **M López**	**6**	**6**
WC	(Spain) N Almagro (Spain) Á Calatrava	1	3

Final
1	(Argentina) **G Etlis** (Argentina) **M Rodríguez**	**7**	**7^{7}**
(Spain) F López (Spain) M López	5	6^{5}
