= 2006 Open de Tenis Comunidad Valenciana – Doubles =

Doubles
- 2006 Open de Tenis Comunidad Valenciana

Final
- Champions: (Czech Republic) David Škoch (Czech Republic) Tomáš Zíb
- Runners-up: (Czech Republic) Lukáš Dlouhý (Czech Republic) Pavel Vízner
- Score: 6–4, 6–3

Details
- Draw: 16
- Seeds: 4

Events
Singles	Doubles
← 2005 ·	Valencia Open	· 2007 →

Fernando González and Martín Rodríguez were the defending champions, but did not participate this year.

David Škoch and Tomáš Zíb won in the final 6–4, 6–3, against Lukáš Dlouhý and Pavel Vízner.

== Seeds ==
1. (Argentina) Martín García / (Argentina) Sebastián Prieto (quarterfinals)
2. (Czech Republic) Petr Pála / (Czech Republic) Cyril Suk (semifinals)
3. (Czech Republic) Jaroslav Levinský / (Slovakia) Michal Mertiňák (first round)
4. (Czech Republic) Lukáš Dlouhý / (Czech Republic) Pavel Vízner (final)

== Draw ==
=== Key ===
- Q = Qualifier
- WC = Wild card
- LL = Lucky loser
- Alt = Alternate
- ITF = ITF entry
- PR = Protected ranking
- SR = Special ranking
- SE = Special exempt
- JE = Junior exempt
- JR = Junior Accelerator Programme entrant
- CO = College Accelerator Programme entrant
- NG = Next Gen Accelerator Program entrant
- w/o = Walkover
- r = Retired
- d = Defaulted

=== Draw ===
First round
1	(Argentina) M García (Argentina) S Prieto	7^{10}	6
Alt	(Austria) A Peya (Germany) B Phau	6^{8}	2
(Spain) A Martín (Spain) R Ramírez Hidalgo	2	4
(Spain) F López (Spain) F Verdasco	6	6
3	(Czech Republic) J Levinský (Slovakia) M Mertiňák	6^{2}	6	[6]
(Czech Republic) D Škoch (Czech Republic) T Zíb	7	1	[10]
WC	(Spain) Á Calatrava (Spain) S Ventura	6	4	[7]
(Switzerland) Y Allegro (Italy) D Sanguinetti	4	6	[10]
(Romania) A Pavel (Netherlands) R Wassen	3	7	[4]
(South Africa) J Coetzee (South Africa) C Haggard	6	5	[10]
(Italy) P Starace (Italy) F Volandri	1	3
4	(Czech Republic) L Dlouhý (Czech Republic) P Vízner	6	6
WC	(Spain) D Gimeno-Traver (Spain) I Navarro Pastor	6	6
(Germany) C Kas (Germany) P Petzschner	1	3
(Australia) J Kerr (Serbia and Montenegro) B Pašanski	6^{1}	4
2	(Czech Republic) P Pála (Czech Republic) C Suk	7^{7}	6

Quarterfinals
1	(Argentina) M García (Argentina) S Prieto	4	7^{7}	[5]
(Spain) F López (Spain) F Verdasco	6	6^{4}	[10]
(Czech Republic) D Škoch (Czech Republic) T Zíb	1	6	[10]
(Switzerland) Y Allegro (Italy) D Sanguinetti	6	4	[8]
(South Africa) J Coetzee (South Africa) C Haggard	1	1
4	(Czech Republic) L Dlouhý (Czech Republic) P Vízner	6	6
WC	(Spain) D Gimeno-Traver (Spain) I Navarro Pastor	6	2	[6]
2	(Czech Republic) P Pála (Czech Republic) C Suk	2	6	[10]

Semifinals
(Spain) F López (Spain) F Verdasco	4	6	[4]
(Czech Republic) D Škoch (Czech Republic) T Zíb	6	4	[10]
4	(Czech Republic) L Dlouhý (Czech Republic) P Vízner	6	5	[10]
2	(Czech Republic) P Pála (Czech Republic) C Suk	3	7	[5]

Final
(Czech Republic) D Škoch (Czech Republic) T Zíb	6	6
4	(Czech Republic) L Dlouhý (Czech Republic) P Vízner	4	3
