= 2004 Open de Tenis Comunidad Valenciana =

Tennis tournament

- Date: 12–18 April
- Edition: 10th
- Category: International Series
- Draw: 32S / 16D
- Prize money: $375,000
- Surface: Clay / outdoor
- Location: Valencia, Spain

Champions

Singles
- (Spain) Fernando Verdasco

Doubles
- (Argentina) Gastón Etlis / (Argentina) Martín Rodríguez
← 2003 ·	Valencia Open	· 2005 →

The 2004 Open de Tenis Comunidad Valenciana was a men's tennis tournament played on outdoor clay courts in Valencia, Spain and was part of the International Series of the 2004 ATP Tour. It was the tenth edition of the tournament and was held from 12 April until 18 April 2004. Unseeded Fernando Verdasco won the singles title.

== Finals ==
=== Singles ===
(Spain) Fernando Verdasco defeated (Spain) Albert Montañés 7–6^{(7–5)}, 6–3

- It was Verdasco's 1st title of the year and the 1st of his career.

=== Doubles ===
(Argentina) Gastón Etlis / (Argentina) Martín Rodríguez defeated (Spain) Feliciano López / (Spain) Marc López 7–5, 7–6^{(7–5)}

- It was Etlis's only title of the year and the 3rd of his career. It was Rodríguez's only title of the year and the 4th of his career.
