= 2005 Open de Tenis Comunidad Valenciana – Doubles =

Doubles
- 2005 Open de Tenis Comunidad Valenciana

Final
- Champions: (Chile) Fernando González (Argentina) Martín Rodríguez
- Runners-up: (Argentina) Lucas Arnold (Argentina) Mariano Hood
- Score: 6–4, 6–4

Details
- Draw: 16
- Seeds: 4

Events
Singles	Doubles
← 2004 ·	Valencia Open	· 2006 →

Gastón Etlis and Martín Rodríguez were the defending champions, but did not participate together this year. Etlis did not participate this year. Rodríguez partnered Fernando González and they won the title, defeating Lucas Arnold and Mariano Hood 6–4, 6–4 in the final.

== Seeds ==
1. (Argentina) Lucas Arnold / (Argentina) Mariano Hood (final)
2. (Austria) Julian Knowle / (Czech Republic) Petr Pála (semifinals)
3. (Chile) Fernando González / (Argentina) Martín Rodríguez (champions)
4. (Czech Republic) Jaroslav Levinský / (Belgium) Olivier Rochus (quarterfinals)

== Draw ==
=== Key ===
- Q = Qualifier
- WC = Wild card
- LL = Lucky loser
- Alt = Alternate
- ITF = ITF entry
- PR = Protected ranking
- SR = Special ranking
- SE = Special exempt
- JE = Junior exempt
- JR = Junior Accelerator Programme entrant
- CO = College Accelerator Programme entrant
- NG = Next Gen Accelerator Program entrant
- w/o = Walkover
- r = Retired
- d = Defaulted

=== Draw ===
First round
1	(Argentina) L Arnold (Argentina) M Hood	7	6
(Spain) G Burniol (Spain) D Gimeno-Traver	5	0
(Denmark) K Carlsen (Italy) U Vico	6^{5}	3
(Czech Republic) T Cibulec (Czech Republic) D Škoch	7^{7}	6
4	(Czech Republic) J Levinský (Belgium) O Rochus	7^{7}	5	7
(Spain) Á Calatrava (Spain) D Ferrer	6^{4}	7	5
(United States) R Leach (United States) T Parrott	7^{7}	6
(Croatia) I Karlović (Czech Republic) P Luxa	6^{3}	2
WC	(Spain) MÁ López Jaén (Spain) JA Sánchez-de Luna	3	1
(Russia) I Andreev (Russia) N Davydenko	6	6
(South Africa) C Haggard (South Africa) R Koenig	4	3
3	(Chile) F González (Argentina) M Rodríguez	6	6
(Germany) P Kohlschreiber (Germany) A Waske	7^{8}	6^{5}	6
(Spain) A Martín (Spain) A Montañés	6^{6}	7^{7}	3
(Spain) Ó Hernández (Italy) P Starace	2	2
2	(Austria) J Knowle (Czech Republic) P Pála	6	6

Quarterfinals
1	(Argentina) L Arnold (Argentina) M Hood	3	7^{10}	7^{7}
(Czech Republic) T Cibulec (Czech Republic) D Škoch	6	6^{8}	6^{4}
4	(Czech Republic) J Levinský (Belgium) O Rochus	5	2
(United States) R Leach (United States) T Parrott	7	6
(Russia) I Andreev (Russia) N Davydenko	6^{1}	6	2
3	(Chile) F González (Argentina) M Rodríguez	7^{7}	1	6
(Germany) P Kohlschreiber (Germany) A Waske	1	6^{8}
2	(Austria) J Knowle (Czech Republic) P Pála	6	7^{10}

Semifinals
1	(Argentina) L Arnold (Argentina) M Hood	7^{8}	6
(United States) R Leach (United States) T Parrott	6^{6}	0
3	(Chile) F González (Argentina) M Rodríguez	6	6
2	(Austria) J Knowle (Czech Republic) P Pála	4	3

Final
1	(Argentina) L Arnold (Argentina) M Hood	4	4
3	(Chile) F González (Argentina) M Rodríguez	6	6
