= 2006 Open de Tenis Comunidad Valenciana =

- Date: 10–16 April
- Edition: 12th
- Category: International Series
- Draw: 32S / 16D
- Prize money: $375,000
- Surface: Clay / outdoor
- Location: Valencia, Spain

Champions

Singles
- (Spain) Nicolás Almagro

Doubles
- (Czech Republic) David Škoch / (Czech Republic) Tomáš Zíb
← 2005 ·	Valencia Open	· 2007 →

The 2006 Open de Tenis Comunidad Valenciana was an Association of Tennis Professionals men's tennis tournament held in Valencia, Spain that was part of the International Series of the 2005 ATP Tour. It was the 12th edition of the event which was won by unseeded Nicolás Almagro in men's singles and David Škoch and Tomáš Zíb in doubles.

== Finals ==
=== Singles ===
(Spain) Nicolás Almagro defeated (France) Gilles Simon, 6–2, 6–3

=== Doubles ===
(Czech Republic) David Škoch / (Czech Republic) Tomáš Zíb defeated (Czech Republic) Lukáš Dlouhý / (Czech Republic) Pavel Vízner, 6–4, 6–3
