= 2004 Open de Tenis Comunidad Valenciana – Singles =

Singles
- 2004 Open de Tenis Comunidad Valenciana

Final
- Champion: (Spain) Fernando Verdasco
- Runner-up: (Spain) Albert Montañés
- Score: 7–6^{(7–5)}, 6–3

Details
- Draw: 32
- Seeds: 8

Events
Singles	Doubles
- Valencia Open

Juan Carlos Ferrero was the defending champion but lost in the semifinals to Fernando Verdasco.

Verdasco won in the final 7–6^{(7–5)}, 6–3 against Albert Montañés.

== Seeds ==
A champion seed is indicated in bold text while text in italics indicates the round in which that seed was eliminated.

1. (Spain) Juan Carlos Ferrero (semifinals)
2. (Spain) Feliciano López (second round)
3. (Croatia) Ivan Ljubičić (second round)
4. (Spain) Albert Costa (second round)
5. (Spain) David Sánchez (first round)
6. (Spain) Alberto Martín (semifinals)
7. (Spain) David Ferrer (quarterfinals)
8. (Spain) Rubén Ramírez Hidalgo (second round)

== Draw ==
Key

- Q = Qualifier
- WC = Wild card
- LL = Lucky loser
- Alt = Alternate
- ITF = ITF entry
- PR = Protected ranking
- SR = Special ranking
- SE = Special exempt
- JE = Junior exempt
- JR = Junior Accelerator Programme entrant
- CO = College Accelerator Programme entrant
- NG = Next Gen Accelerator Program entrant
- w/o = Walkover
- r = Retired
- d = Defaulted

First round
1	(Spain) **J C Ferrero**	**6**	**7**
WC	(Spain) I Matos Gil	2	5
WC	(Spain) G Burniol	3	**6**	4
(Czech Republic) **J Vacek**	**6**	3	**6**
(Croatia) **M Ančić**	**6**	**6**
(Israel) H Levy	1	1
Q	(Spain) Á Calatrava	**7^{9}**	6^{1}	4
8	(Spain) **R Ramírez Hidalgo**	6^{7}	**7^{7}**	**6**
3	(Croatia) **I Ljubičić**	**6**	**6**
WC	(Spain) G García-López	3	4
(Spain) **F Verdasco**	**6**	**6**
(Spain) A Portas	1	4
(Netherlands) D van Scheppingen	0	4
(Netherlands) **R Sluiter**	**6**	**6**
(Ecuador) G Lapentti	4	3
7	(Spain) **D Ferrer**	**6**	**6**
6	(Spain) **A Martín**	**6**	**6**
Q	(Spain) N Almagro	2	4
(Spain) Ó Hernández	6^{5}	**6**	6^{5}
(Spain) **F Vicente**	**7^{7}**	2	**7^{7}**
Q	(Austria) W Eschauer	4	2
(Belgium) **C Rochus**	**6**	**6**
(Spain) G Blanco	3	4
4	(Spain) **A Costa**	**6**	**6**
5	(Spain) D Sánchez	**7**	2	2
(Spain) **À Corretja**	5	**6**	**6**
(Austria) S Koubek	5	0
Q	(Spain) **M López**	**7**	**6**
(Spain) **A Montañés**	**6**	**6**
(Netherlands) J van Lottum	3	1
(Russia) I Andreev	4	2
2	(Spain) **F López**	**6**	**6**

Second round
1	(Spain) **J C Ferrero**	**6**	**7**
(Czech Republic) J Vacek	3	5
(Croatia) **M Ančić**	**7**	**6**
8	(Spain) R Ramírez Hidalgo	5	2
3	(Croatia) I Ljubičić	4	4
(Spain) **F Verdasco**	**6**	**6**
(Netherlands) R Sluiter	2	4
7	(Spain) **D Ferrer**	**6**	**6**
6	(Spain) **A Martín**	**6**	5	**6**
(Spain) F Vicente	3	**7**	4
(Belgium) **C Rochus**	**6**	**6**
4	(Spain) A Costa	4	3
(Spain) À Corretja	4	4
Q	(Spain) **M López**	**6**	**6**
(Spain) **A Montañés**	4	**6**	**6**
2	(Spain) F López	**6**	2	4

Quarterfinals
1	(Spain) **J C Ferrero**	**6**	**6**
(Croatia) M Ančić	4	4
(Spain) **F Verdasco**	**6**	**6**
7	(Spain) D Ferrer	2	3
6	(Spain) **A Martín**	**6**	**6**
(Belgium) C Rochus	1	2
Q	(Spain) M López	**6**	2	0
(Spain) **A Montañés**	2	**6**	**6**

Semifinals
1	(Spain) J C Ferrero	2	1
(Spain) **F Verdasco**	**6**	**6**
6	(Spain) A Martín	**6**	2	2
(Spain) **A Montañés**	4	**6**	**6**

Final
(Spain) **Fernando Verdasco**	**7^{7}**	**6**
(Spain) Albert Montañés	6^{5}	3
