= 2003 CAM Open Comunidad Valenciana – Doubles =

Doubles
- 2003 CAM Open Comunidad Valenciana

Final
- Champions: (Argentina) Lucas Arnold (Argentina) Mariano Hood
- Runners-up: (United States) Brian MacPhie (Serbia and Montenegro) Nenad Zimonjić
- Score: 6–1, 6–7^{(7–9)}, 6–4

Details
- Draw: 16
- Seeds: 4

Events
Singles	Doubles
← 2002 ·	Valencia Open	· 2004 →

Mahesh Bhupathi and Leander Paes were the defending champions but did not compete that year.

Lucas Arnold and Mariano Hood won in the final 6–1, 6–7^{(7–9)}, 6–4 against Brian MacPhie and Nenad Zimonjić.

== Seeds ==
Champion seeds are indicated in bold text while text in italics indicates the round in which those seeds were eliminated.

1. (United States) Bob Bryan / (United States) Mike Bryan (semifinals)
2. (Czech Republic) František Čermák / (Czech Republic) Leoš Friedl (first round)
3. (Argentina) Gastón Etlis / (Argentina) Martín Rodríguez (quarterfinals)
4. (United States) Brian MacPhie / (Serbia and Montenegro) Nenad Zimonjić (final)

== Draw ==
=== Key ===
- Q = Qualifier
- WC = Wild card
- LL = Lucky loser
- Alt = Alternate
- ITF = ITF entry
- PR = Protected ranking
- SR = Special ranking
- SE = Special exempt
- JE = Junior exempt
- JR = Junior Accelerator Programme entrant
- CO = College Accelerator Programme entrant
- NG = Next Gen Accelerator Program entrant
- w/o = Walkover
- r = Retired
- d = Defaulted

First round
1	(United States) **B Bryan** (United States) **M Bryan**	**6**	**6**
(Spain) D Sánchez (Spain) F Vicente	0	2
WC	(Spain) **Á Calatrava** (Spain) **F Clavet**	**7^{7}**	**6**
(Sweden) S Aspelin (Slovakia) K Beck	6^{3}	3
4	(United States) **B MacPhie** (Serbia and Montenegro) **N Zimonjić**	**6**	6^{5}	**7^{8}**
(South Africa) D Adams (Australia) A Kratzmann	3	**7^{7}**	6^{6}
(Spain) **A Portas** (Armenia) **S Sargsian**	**6**	**6**
WC	(Spain) J Giner (Spain) S Ventura	3	0
ALT	(Spain) **Ó Hernández** (Spain) **S Navarro**	**6**	**6**
(Argentina) S Prieto (Brazil) A Sá	3	2
(United States) D Bowen (Australia) A Fisher	1	**7^{7}**	5
3	(Argentina) **G Etlis** (Argentina) **M Rodríguez**	**6**	6^{5}	**7**
(Spain) D Ferrer (Spain) F López	6^{6}	4
(Slovakia) **D Hrbatý** (Czech Republic) **D Škoch**	**7^{8}**	**6**
(Argentina) **L Arnold** (Argentina) **M Hood**	**6**	**6**
2	(Czech Republic) F Čermák (Czech Republic) L Friedl	3	2

Quarterfinals
1	(United States) **B Bryan** (United States) **M Bryan**	**6**	**6**
WC	(Spain) Á Calatrava (Spain) F Clavet	3	0
4	(United States) **B MacPhie** (Serbia and Montenegro) **N Zimonjić**	**6**	**6**
(Spain) A Portas (Armenia) S Sargsian	4	3
ALT	(Spain) **Ó Hernández** (Spain) **S Navarro**	**7^{9}**	**7^{7}**
3	(Argentina) G Etlis (Argentina) M Rodríguez	6^{7}	6^{4}
(Slovakia) D Hrbatý (Czech Republic) D Škoch	2	2
2	(Argentina) **L Arnold** (Argentina) **M Hood**	**6**	**6**

Semifinals
1	(United States) B Bryan (United States) M Bryan	6^{6}	**6**	1
4	(United States) **B MacPhie** (Serbia and Montenegro) **N Zimonjić**	**7^{8}**	4	**6**
ALT	(Spain) Ó Hernández (Spain) S Navarro	**7**	4	3
(Argentina) **L Arnold** (Argentina) **M Hood**	5	**6**	**6**

Final
4	(United States) B MacPhie (Serbia and Montenegro) N Zimonjić	1	**7^{9}**	4
(Argentina) **L Arnold** (Argentina) **M Hood**	**6**	6^{7}	**6**
