= 2008 Open de Tenis Comunidad Valenciana – Singles =

Singles
- 2008 Open de Tenis Comunidad Valenciana

Final
- Champion: (Spain) David Ferrer
- Runner-up: (Spain) Nicolás Almagro
- Score: 4–6, 6–2, 7–6^{(7–2)}

Details
- Draw: 32 (4Q / 3WC)
- Seeds: 8

Events
Singles	Doubles
- Valencia Open

Nicolás Almagro was the defending champion, but first-seeded David Ferrer defeated him 4–6, 6–2, 7–6^{(7–2)}, in the final.

== Seeds ==
1. (Spain) David Ferrer (champion)
2. (Argentina) Juan Mónaco (quarterfinals)
3. (Spain) Tommy Robredo (semifinals)
4. (Spain) Juan Carlos Ferrero (first round)
5. (Spain) Nicolás Almagro (final)
6. (Russia) Igor Andreev (first round)
7. (Spain) Fernando Verdasco (quarterfinals)
8. (Italy) Potito Starace (quarterfinals, retired due to a right hip injury)

== Draw ==
Key

- Q = Qualifier
- WC = Wild card
- LL = Lucky loser
- Alt = Alternate
- ITF = ITF entry
- PR = Protected ranking
- SR = Special ranking
- SE = Special exempt
- JE = Junior exempt
- JR = Junior Accelerator Programme entrant
- CO = College Accelerator Programme entrant
- NG = Next Gen Accelerator Program entrant
- w/o = Walkover
- r = Retired
- d = Defaulted

=== Finals ===
Semifinals
1	(Spain) David Ferrer	2	6	6
3/WC	(Spain) Tommy Robredo	6	2	3
(Russia) Evgeny Korolev	1	4
5	(Spain) Nicolás Almagro	6	6

Final
1	(Spain) David Ferrer	4	6	7^{7}
5	(Spain) Nicolás Almagro	6	2	6^{2}

=== Top half ===
First round
1	(Spain) D Ferrer	6	6
(Spain) I Navarro	3	4
(Belgium) K Vliegen	4	1
Q	(Spain) P Andújar	6	6
(Peru) L Horna	3	7^{7}	4
(Germany) M Zverev	6	6^{5}	6
(Ecuador) N Lapentti	7	3	4
7	(Spain) F Verdasco	5	6	6
3/WC	(Spain) T Robredo	6	7
(Spain) Montañés	3	5
Q	(Spain) D Marrero	6^{3}	6^{6}
(Spain) S Ventura	7^{7}	7^{8}
(Argentina) M González	3	4
(France) G Monfils	6	6
(Italy) S Bolelli	3	1
8	(Italy) P Starace	6	6

Second round
1	(Spain) D Ferrer	6	6
Q	(Spain) P Andújar	3	4
(Germany) M Zverev	4	2
7	(Spain) F Verdasco	6	6
3/WC	(Spain) T Robredo	6^{7}	6	6
(Spain) S Ventura	7^{9}	3	4
(France) G Monfils	5	1
8	(Italy) P Starace	7	6

Quarterfinals
1	(Spain) D Ferrer	6	1	7
7	(Spain) F Verdasco	3	6	5
3/WC	(Spain) T Robredo	6	3
8	(Italy) P Starace	3	0^{r}

Semifinals
1	(Spain) D Ferrer	2	6	6
3/WC	(Spain) T Robredo	6	2	3

=== Bottom half ===
First round
6	(Russia) I Andreev	4	6	6^{4}
(Russia) E Korolev	6	4	7^{7}
WC	(Spain) D Gimeno Traver	6	6
(Ukraine) S Stakhovsky	4	4
(Kazakhstan) Y Schukin	4	1^{r}
(Netherlands) R Haase	6	4
WC	(Russia) M Safin	6	5	6
4	(Spain) JC Ferrero	3	7	4
5	(Spain) N Almagro	7	6
Q	(Spain) M Á Lopez Jaén	5	3
(Argentina) E Schwank	6	2
Q	(Belgium) C Rochus	2	0^{r}
(Spain) G García López	6
(Belgium) S Darcis	4	r
(Austria) W Eschauer	7^{7}	4	4
2	(Argentina) J Mónaco	6^{5}	6	6

Second round
(Russia) E Korolev	6^{8}	7^{7}	6
WC	(Spain) D Gimeno Traver	7^{10}	6^{2}	3
(Netherlands) R Haase	2	7^{11}	6
WC	(Russia) M Safin	6	6^{9}	4
5	(Spain) N Almagro	6	6
(Argentina) E Schwank	3	4
(Spain) G García López	4	4
2	(Argentina) J Mónaco	6	6

Quarterfinals
(Russia) E Korolev	7	6
(Netherlands) R Haase	5	4
5	(Spain) N Almagro	6	6
2	(Argentina) J Mónaco	3	2

Semifinals
(Russia) E Korolev	1	4
5	(Spain) N Almagro	6	6
