= 2009 Valencia Open 500 =

- Date: 2–8 November
- Edition: 15th
- Category: ATP World Tour 500
- Draw: 32S / 16D
- Prize money: €1,357,000
- Surface: Hard / indoor
- Location: Valencia, Spain
- Venue: Ciutat de les Arts i les Ciències

Champions

Singles
- (United Kingdom) Andy Murray

Doubles
- (Czech Republic) František Čermák / (Slovakia) Michal Mertiňák
← 2008 ·	Valencia Open	· 2010 →

The 2009 Valencia Open 500 was a men's tennis tournament played on indoor hard courts. It was the 15th edition of the Open de Tenis Comunidad Valenciana, and was part of the 500 Series of the 2009 ATP Tour. It was held at the Ciutat de les Arts i les Ciències in Valencia, Spain, from 2 November until 8 November 2009. First-seeded Andy Murray won the singles title.

== Finals ==
=== Singles ===
(United Kingdom) Andy Murray defeated (Russia) Mikhail Youzhny, 6–3, 6–2

- It was Murray's 6th title of the year and 14th of his career.

=== Doubles ===
(Czech Republic) František Čermák / (Slovakia) Michal Mertiňák defeated (Spain) Marcel Granollers / (Spain) Tommy Robredo, 6–4, 6–3

== Players ==
=== Seeds ===
Country	Player	Rank^{1}	Seed
GBR	Andy Murray	4	1
RUS	Nikolay Davydenko	6	2
FRA	Jo-Wilfried Tsonga	8	3
ESP	Fernando Verdasco	9	4
FRA	Gilles Simon	12	5
FRA	Gaël Monfils	15	6
ESP	Tommy Robredo	16	7
ESP	David Ferrer	18	8

- Seeds are based on the rankings of October 26, 2009 and subject to change

=== Other entrants ===
The following players received wildcards into the singles main draw:

- (Spain) Daniel Gimeno-Traver
- (Spain) Marcel Granollers
- (Spain) Óscar Hernández

The following players received entry from the qualifying draw:

- (Spain) Roberto Bautista-Agut
- (Colombia) Alejandro Falla
- (Spain) Alberto Martín
- (Belgium) Christophe Rochus
