= 2003 CAM Open Comunidad Valenciana =

- Date: 28 April – 4 May
- Edition: 9th
- Category: International Series
- Draw: 32S / 16D
- Prize money: $375,000
- Surface: Clay / outdoor
- Location: Valencia, Spain

Champions

Singles
- (Spain) Juan Carlos Ferrero

Doubles
- (Argentina) Lucas Arnold / (Argentina) Mariano Hood
- Valencia Open

The 2003 CAM Open Comunidad Valenciana was a men's tennis tournament played on outdoor clay courts in Valencia, Spain and was part of the International Series of the 2003 ATP Tour. It was the 9th edition of the tournament and was held from 28 April through 4 May 2003. First-seeded Juan Carlos Ferrero won the singles title.

== Finals ==
=== Singles ===
(Spain) Juan Carlos Ferrero defeated (Belgium) Christophe Rochus 6–2, 6–4

- It was Ferrero's 2nd title of the year and the 9th of his career.

=== Doubles ===
(Argentina) Lucas Arnold / (Argentina) Mariano Hood defeated (United States) Brian MacPhie / (Serbia and Montenegro) Nenad Zimonjić 6–1, 6–7^{(7–9)}, 6–4

- It was Arnold's 1st title of the year and the 10th of his career. It was Hood's 1st title of the year and the 5th of his career.
