= 2005 Open de Tenis Comunidad Valenciana =

- Date: 4–11 April
- Edition: 11th
- Category: International Series
- Draw: 32S / 16D
- Prize money: $375,000
- Surface: Clay / outdoor
- Location: Valencia, Spain

Champions

Singles
- (Russia) Igor Andreev

Doubles
- (Chile) Fernando González / (Argentina) Martín Rodríguez
← 2004 ·	Valencia Open	· 2006 →

The 2005 Open de Tenis Comunidad Valenciana was an Association of Tennis Professionals men's tennis tournament held in Valencia, Spain that was part of the International Series of the 2005 ATP Tour. It was the 11th edition of the tournament and was held from 4 April until 11 April 2005. Seventh-seeded Igor Andreev won the singles title.

== Finals ==
=== Singles ===
(Russia) Igor Andreev defeated (Spain) David Ferrer 6–3, 5–7, 6–3

- It was Andreev's 1st title of the year and the 2nd of his career.

=== Doubles ===
(Chile) Fernando González / (Argentina) Martín Rodríguez defeated (Argentina) Lucas Arnold Ker / (Argentina) Mariano Hood 6–4, 6–4

- It was González's 2nd title of the year and the 7th of his career. It was Rodríguez's 2nd title of the year and the 6th of his career.
