= 2007 Open de Tenis Comunidad Valenciana =

- Date: 9–15 April
- Edition: 13th
- Category: International Series
- Draw: 32S / 16D
- Prize money: $391,000
- Surface: Clay / outdoor
- Location: Valencia, Spain

Champions

Singles
- (Spain) Nicolás Almagro

Doubles
- (South Africa) Wesley Moodie / (Australia) Todd Perry
← 2006 ·	Valencia Open	· 2008 →

The 2007 Open de Tenis Comunidad Valenciana was a men's tennis tournament that was part of the International Series of the 2007 ATP Tour. It was the 13th edition of the tournament and was held on outdoor clay courts from 9 April until 15 April 2007. The event was won by Nicolás Almagro in singles and Wesley Moodie & Todd Perry in doubles.

== Finals ==
=== Singles ===
(Spain) Nicolás Almagro defeated (Italy) Potito Starace, 4–6, 6–2, 6–1

=== Doubles ===
(South Africa) Wesley Moodie / (Australia) Todd Perry defeated (Switzerland) Yves Allegro / (Argentina) Sebastián Prieto, 7–5, 7–5
