= 2009 Valencia Open 500 – Doubles =

Doubles
- 2009 Valencia Open 500

Final
- Champions: (Czech Republic) František Čermák (Slovakia) Michal Mertiňák
- Runners-up: (Spain) Marcel Granollers (Spain) Tommy Robredo
- Score: 6–4, 6–3

Details
- Draw: 16
- Seeds: 4

Events
Singles	Doubles
- Valencia Open

Máximo González and Juan Mónaco were the defending champions, but González chose not to participate this year.
Mónaco partnered with Pablo Cuevas, but they lost in the second round against Victor Hănescu and Horia Tecău.
František Čermák and Michal Mertiňák won in the final 6–4, 6–3, against Marcel Granollers and Tommy Robredo.

== Seeds ==
1. (Poland) Mariusz Fyrstenberg / (Poland) Marcin Matkowski (first round)
2. (Poland) Łukasz Kubot / (Austria) Oliver Marach (first round)
3. (Czech Republic) František Čermák / (Slovakia) Michal Mertiňák (champions)
4. (Czech Republic) Martin Damm / (Austria) Julian Knowle (first round)

== Draw ==
Key

- Q = Qualifier
- WC = Wild card
- LL = Lucky loser
- Alt = Alternate
- ITF = ITF entry
- PR = Protected ranking
- SR = Special ranking
- SE = Special exempt
- JE = Junior exempt
- JR = Junior Accelerator Programme entrant
- CO = College Accelerator Programme entrant
- NG = Next Gen Accelerator Program entrant
- w/o = Walkover
- r = Retired
- d = Defaulted

First round
1	(Poland) M Fyrstenberg (Poland) M Matkowski	3	6	[9]
(Romania) V Hănescu (Romania) H Tecău	6	3	[11]
(Russia) I Andreev (Russia) M Youzhny	2	3
(Uruguay) P Cuevas (Argentina) J Mónaco	6	6
3	(Czech Republic) F Čermák (Slovakia) M Mertiňák	4	6	[10]
(United Kingdom) R Hutchins (Australia) J Kerr	6	4	[6]
(South Africa) J Coetzee (Australia) S Huss	6	6
WC	(Spain) M López (Spain) R Ramírez Hidalgo	3	4
(Spain) N Almagro (Spain) S Ventura	6^{3}	2
(United States) E Butorac (United States) R Ram	7^{7}	6
ALT	(Spain) G García López (Spain) A Montañés	6	4	[13]
4	(Czech Republic) M Damm (Austria) J Knowle	3	6	[11]
(The Bahamas) M Knowles (France) M Llodra	6	6
WC	(Spain) R Bautista Agut (Spain) J Martí	3	1
(Spain) M Granollers (Spain) T Robredo	6^{6}	6	[10]
2	(Poland) Ł Kubot (Austria) O Marach	7^{8}	3	[5]

Quarterfinals
(Romania) V Hănescu (Romania) H Tecău	7	6
(Uruguay) P Cuevas (Argentina) J Mónaco	5	1
3	(Czech Republic) F Čermák (Slovakia) M Mertiňák	3	6	[13]
(South Africa) J Coetzee (Australia) S Huss	6	4	[11]
(United States) E Butorac (United States) R Ram	2	7^{7}	[10]
ALT	(Spain) G García López (Spain) A Montañés	6	6^{4}	[7]
(The Bahamas) M Knowles (France) M Llodra	5	4
(Spain) M Granollers (Spain) T Robredo	7	6

Semifinals
(Romania) V Hănescu (Romania) H Tecău	5	3
3	(Czech Republic) F Čermák (Slovakia) M Mertiňák	7	6
(United States) E Butorac (United States) R Ram	3	4
(Spain) M Granollers (Spain) T Robredo	6	6

Final
3	(Czech Republic) F Čermák (Slovakia) M Mertiňák	6	6
(Spain) M Granollers (Spain) T Robredo	4	3
