= Juan Carlos Ferrero =

Spanish tennis player (born 1980)

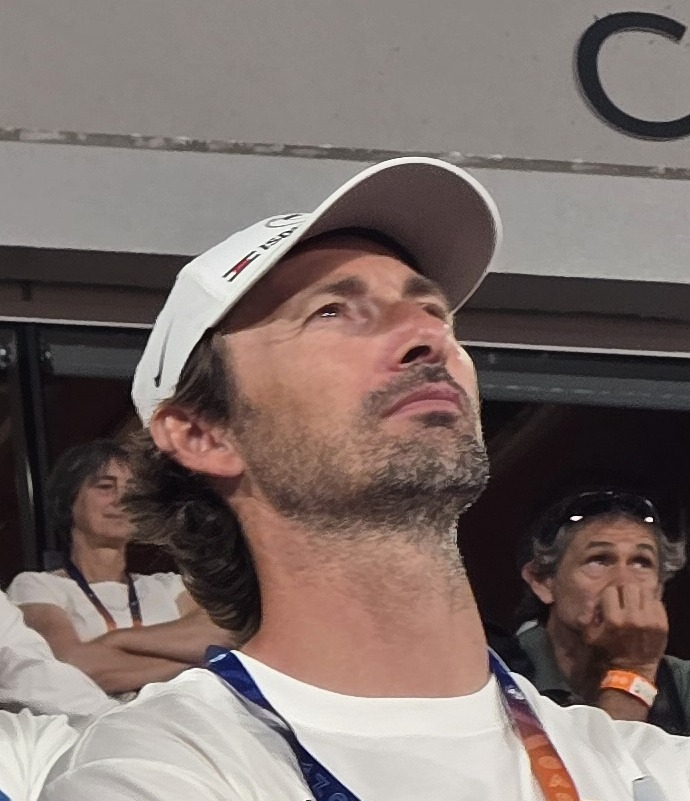
- Ferrero in 2025
- Full name: Juan Carlos Ferrero Donat
- Country (sports): Spain
- Born: 12 February 1980 (age 46) Ontinyent, Spain
- Height: 1.83 m (6 ft 0 in)
- Turned pro: 1998
- Retired: 2012
- Plays: Right-handed (two-handed backhand)
- Prize money: US$13,992,895

Singles
- Career record: 479–262 (64.6%)
- Career titles: 16
- Highest ranking: No. 1 (8 September 2003)

Grand Slam singles results
- Australian Open: SF (2004)
- French Open: W (2003)
- Wimbledon: QF (2007, 2009)
- US Open: F (2003)

Other tournaments
- Tour Finals: F (2002)
- Olympic Games: QF (2000)

Doubles
- Career record: 6–24 (20.0%)
- Career titles: 0
- Highest ranking: No. 198 (3 February 2003)

Grand Slam doubles results
- Australian Open: 1R (2004, 2005)
- Wimbledon: 1R (2002, 2003)
- US Open: 1R (2006)

Team competitions
- Davis Cup: W (2000, 2004, 2009)

Coaching career (2017–2025)
- Alexander Zverev (2017–2018); Carlos Alcaraz (2019–2025)

Coaching achievements
- Coachee singles titles total: 26
- List of notable tournaments (with champion): 2x French Open (Alcaraz); 2x Wimbledon (Alcaraz); 2x US Open (Alcaraz); 8x ATP Tour Masters 1000 (Alcaraz); 1x ATP Tour Masters 1000 (Zverev)

Juan Carlos Ferrero Donat (Spanish: [xwaŋ ˈkaɾlos feˈreɾo ðoˈnat]; (Note: In isolation, Juan and Donat are pronounced [xwan] and [doˈnat] respectively.) born 12 February 1980) is a Spanish sports coach and a former professional tennis player. He was ranked as the world No. 1 in men's singles by the Association of Tennis Professionals (ATP), achieved in September 2003. Ferrero won 16 ATP Tour–level singles titles, including a major at the 2003 French Open and four Masters events. He was also runner-up at the 2002 French Open and 2003 US Open. He was nicknamed el Mosquito ("the Mosquito") for his speed and slender physical build.

Ferrero retired from professional tennis in 2012. Afterward, he took up directorship of the Ferrero Tennis Academy in Alicante, Villena, where he himself had been trained. In July 2017, he began coaching top player Alexander Zverev. Their partnership ended after seven months due to differences between them. In 2019, Ferrero became coach to a young Carlos Alcaraz. The partnership was an immediate success, and produced 24 ATP Tour–level titles, including six majors and eight Masters events. In December 2025, Ferrero and Alcaraz ended their partnership. As of January 2026, Ferrero has been working as a mental performance coach for golf player Ángel Ayora.

== Personal life ==
Nicknamed Juanki, JC, and "el Mosquito", Ferrero began playing tennis at age seven with his father, Eduardo Ferrero Micó (1943–2022), who often traveled with him. He has two sisters, Ana and Laura. He has cited his mother, Rosario, who died of cancer when he was sixteen, as his inspiration throughout his tennis career. Ferrero married Eva Alonso in Valencia in July 2015. They had their first child, a daughter, in September 2014, and they have had two more children since.

In July 2007, Ferrero bought an old cottage in Bocairent, south of Valencia, and refurbished it into the "Hotel Ferrero", which features 12 luxury suites. He used to be a joint owner of the Valencia Open tournament along with fellow tennis player David Ferrer.

== Career ==
=== Early years ===
Born in Ontinyent, Ferrero came to prominence in 1998 when he made the final of the Junior French Open, losing to Fernando González. He finished the year ranked as the No. 17 junior. He then made his professional debut in 1998 by reaching the finals of his first Futures tournament in Italy. He won two Futures events in Spain and ended the year ranked No. 345.

=== 1999: ATP debut ===
Ferrero made his ATP main draw debut at the Grand Prix Hassan II as a qualifier, where he reached the semi-finals. He followed this up by winning a Challenger event in Naples. He then received a wildcard at the Barcelona Open, where he reached the third round, losing to Carlos Moyá. He reached back–to–back finals at his next two tournaments, after which he debuted in the top 100 at No. 95. He reached his fourth Challenger final of the year at Graz, where he lost to Tomáš Zíb. He then played at the Austrian Open, where he earned his first top 20 win in the second round against No. 15 Tommy Haas, before losing in the quarterfinals. He made his Grand Slam debut at the US Open in August, losing to ninth-seeded Greg Rusedski in the first round. The following month, at just his fifth Tour-level event, he won his first career title at the Majorca Open, which propelled him from No. 68 to 47. He ended the year at No. 43 and won the ATP Newcomer of the Year award.

=== 2000: Top 20 debut ===
Ferrero began the year at the Auckland Open, where he made the quarterfinals. He reached the third round in his Australian Open debut, where he was defeated by Younes El Aynaoui in a tight five–setter. In Dubai, he earned his first top 10 win over ninth-ranked Nicolás Lapentti in the second round, before losing to Nicolas Kiefer in the final. He backed this up with a semifinal at the Franklin Templeton Tennis Classic, which he lost to Australian Lleyton Hewitt. He lost his first matches at Indian Wells to Michael Chang and in Miami to George Bastl. He then represented Spain at the Davis Cup for the first time, where he won both of his matches.

During the European clay season, Ferrero made back–to–back quarterfinals at the Estoril Open and the Monte Carlo Open, his first Masters quarterfinal. He lost to Nicolás Lapentti and Gastón Gaudio respectively. He made it to his second final of the year at the Barcelona Open, which he lost to Marat Safin. By doing so, Ferrero entered the top 20 for the first time, ranked No. 18. Ferrero only made the third round of the Italian Open, where he lost to Mariano Puerta, and the second round of the German Open, where he lost to Andrei Pavel. He bounced back by reaching the semifinals of his first French Open after defeating No. 10 Àlex Corretja, before losing to the eventual champion Gustavo Kuerten in five sets. He chose not to compete at Wimbledon.

At the US Open, Ferrero reached the fourth round but lost in straight sets to eventual champion Marat Safin. He represented Spain at the Olympics in Sydney, where he reached the quarterfinals, losing to France's Arnaud di Pasquale. He then suffered losses in the first match at his next four events: in Vienna to Richard Krajicek, in Toulouse to Magnus Gustafsson, at the Swiss Indoors to Richard Krajicek, and at the Stuttgart Masters to Younes El Aynaoui. The drought ended when he reached the semifinals of the Paris Masters, where he lost once again to eventual champion Safin. Ferrero lost in the first round of the Stockholm Open to Adrian Voinea. Ferrero then played for Spain in the Davis Cup final against Australia. He won both his matches against Patrick Rafter and Lleyton Hewitt, leading Spain to their first Davis Cup title. Although Ferrero did not win any titles in 2000, his performances in the slam tournaments helped him end the year ranked No. 12.

=== 2001: Top 10 debut ===
Ferrero began the year poorly, suffering three consecutive losses. This streak began with a second round loss at the Australian Open to Australian Andrew Ilie in five sets, followed by losses at the Davis Cup to Dutch Raemon Sluiter, in five sets, and in the first round at Rotterdam to Ivan Ljubičić. Ferrero bounced back with a title win in Dubai, where he upset World No. 5 Magnus Norman in the quarterfinals before defeating Marat Safin in the final. He suffered a first-round loss at Indian Wells in three tie–break sets to Nicolás Massú, and a fourth-round loss to Gastón Gaudio in Miami.

Ferrero began the European clay season by winning the Estoril Open in an all–Spanish final, defeating Félix Mantilla. With this win, he became No. 9 in the world, his first entry into the top ten. Ferrero then suffered an early exit at the second round of the Monte Carlo Masters to Galo Blanco. He recovered by winning two tournaments in a row: the Barcelona Open, where he defeated Carlos Moyá, and the Rome Masters, where he defeated Gustavo Kuerten. This was Ferrero's first win over a world No. 1 and his first Masters title. Ferrero made it to a third consecutive final at the Hamburg Masters, which he lost to Albert Portas. He reached the semifinals at the French Open for the second consecutive year after defeating Lleyton Hewitt in straight sets. He then lost to the No. 1 seed, defending champion, and eventual champion Kuerten in straight sets. Ferrero then played his first Wimbledon, where he reached the third round before losing to Britain's Greg Rusedski in straight sets.

Ferrero reached the finals at Gstaad, where he lost to Jiří Novák. He lost to Nicolás Lapentti in the quarterfinals of the Austrian Open, and to Patrick Rafter in the quarterfinals of the Canada Masters. Ferrero's results in the US were disappointing: he lost to Hicham Arazi in the second round of Cincinnati, and was upset by compatriot Tommy Robredo in a tight five-setter in the third round of the US Open. Ferrero then helped his Davis Cup team get back to the World Group stage by defeating Uzbekistan's Oleg Ogorodov. He made the quarterfinals of the Salem Open, where he lost to Rainer Schüttler, and of Lyon, where he lost to Younes El Aynaoui. Ferrero then lost in the first round of the Stuttgart Masters, to Thomas Enqvist and the St. Petersburg Open, to Rainer Schüttler. At the final Masters event of the year in Paris, he lost to Arazi in the third round. Ferrero qualified for the Tennis Masters Cup. In the round robin stage, he lost to Yevgeny Kafelnikov, but defeated Gustavo Kuerten and Goran Ivanišević to advance to the semifinals. In the semis, he lost to eventual champion Lleyton Hewitt. He finished the year ranked World No. 5.

=== 2002: First slam final, injuries ===
Ferrero missed the 2002 Australian Open due to bursitis in his right knee. He instead started his year at the Milan Indoor, where he was upset by eventual champion Davide Sanguinetti in the second round. Ferrero represented Spain in its Davis Cup tie against Morocco, where he won against Hicham Arazi but lost to Younes El Aynaoui. He made his first quarterfinal of the year at the Open 13, where he was upset by No. 99 Cédric Pioline. At Rotterdam, Ferrero lost his opening match against eventual champion Nicolas Escudé. As the defending champion in Dubai, he retired in his second-round match, 1–2 down against El Aynaoui with a pulled abductor. Ferrero's form continued to dip as he suffered more early exits: in the first round of Indian Wells against Greg Rusedski, in the third round of Miami against Adrian Voinea (having suffered a stress fracture), and in the second round of the Estoril Open against David Nalbandian.

Ferrero bounced back at the Monte Carlo Masters, where he earned his first top-10 wins of the year against Tommy Haas and Sébastien Grosjean, before defeating Carlos Moyá in straight sets to clinch the title. However, Ferrero was unable to keep his form. He lost to Alberto Martín at the third round at Barcelona, to Ivan Ljubičić in the second round of Rome, and to Alberto Costa in the first round of Hamburg. Due to this bad run of results, Ferrero fell out of the top 10 for the first time in a year. At the 2002 French Open, Ferrero reached his first Grand Slam final, after upsetting No. 4 Andre Agassi in four sets and No. 2 Marat Safin in straight sets. Despite being the strong favourite, Ferrero lost to Alberto Costa in four sets. His foot was injured during the tournament, but he played through it with the aid of some cortisone shots.

Ferrero lost early at Wimbledon to 98th-ranked American Jeff Morrison in straight sets. He reached the finals at the Generali Open, where he lost to Àlex Corretja. He made it to the semifinals of the Cincinnati Masters, where he lost to eventual champion Carlos Moyá. At the US Open, Ferrero lost in the third round to Fernando González. He won his second title of the year in Hong Kong, avenging his recent loss to Moyá by beating him in the final. Ferrero then lost in the quarterfinals of the Madrid Masters to Andre Agassi, and the semifinals of the Swiss Indoors to Fernando González. Ferrero again qualified to play the Tennis Masters Cup. In the round robin stage, Ferrero recorded a loss against Roger Federer but wins over Andre Agassi and Jiří Novák to advance to the semifinals. He defeated compatriot Carlos Moyá to advance to the final, which he lost to World No. 1 Lleyton Hewitt. Ferrero ultimately finished the year ranked No. 4.

=== 2003: World No. 1, Roland-Garros victory ===
Ferrero made a strong start to 2003 by reaching the finals of the Sydney International, where he lost to Hyung-Taik Lee. He went on to reach the quarter–finals of the Australian Open, where he lost to Wayne Ferreira. Ferrero once again represented Spain at Davis Cup in a tie against Belgium, where he won both of his matches, defeating Christophe Rochus and Kristof Vliegen. Ferrero then entered the Rotterdam Open, but was forced to retire with a sprained ankle in the quarterfinals against Raemon Sluiter. Ferrero lost in the round-of-32 at the next two Masters events, Indian Wells and Miami, to Brian Vahaly and Marcelo Ríos respectively. At the quarterfinals of the Davis Cup, where Spain was drawn against Croatia, Ferrero won his only match against Mario Ančić.

Ferrero won his first title of the year as defending champion at the Monte Carlo Masters, where he defeated Guillermo Coria. Ferrero reached the semifinals in Barcelona, where he lost to Marat Safin. He also reached the semifinals of the 2003 Rome Masters, but retired against Roger Federer with a shoulder injury. Ferrero won the Valencia Open, without losing a set, defeating Christophe Rochus in the final. Ferrero then won his first and only slam tournament at the 2003 French Open, defeating surprise finalist Martin Verkerk in straight sets.

Ferrero reached the 4th round of Wimbledon, where he lost to Sébastien Grosjean in four sets. He reached back–to–back quarterfinals at the Generali Open, where he lost to Mariano Zabaleta, and at the Idea Prokom Open, where he lost to Luis Horna. He lost early at both Canada and Cincinnati. At the 2003 US Open, Ferrero's good form at the majors continued: he eliminated both former world No. 1s and US Open champions Lleyton Hewitt and Andre Agassi in four sets. He then lost to Andy Roddick in straight sets in the final. This result nonetheless saw Ferrero seize the No. 1 ranking from Agassi. Ferrero then represented Spain once again at the Davis Cup, this time against Argentina. He defeated Gastón Gaudio, losing only four games, but lost to Agustín Calleri in straight sets. In Bangkok, Ferrero played for the first time in individual competition as World No. 1 and reached the final, which he lost to Taylor Dent. Ferrero took his next title at the Madrid Masters by defeating Nicolás Massú in straight sets. This was his first hard–court Masters title. Ferrero was presented with the Spanish "National Sportsman of the Year" award by King Juan Carlos.

Soon afterwards, however, Ferrero embarked on a six-match losing streak. He lost in the third round of the Paris Masters to Jiří Novák. At the Tennis Masters Cup, he lost all three of his round robin matches against David Nalbandian, Andre Agassi, and Roger Federer. Representing Spain in the Davis Cup final against Australia, he lost both his matches in five sets, against Lleyton Hewitt and Mark Philippoussis. Ferrero ended the year ranked No. 3, behind Andy Roddick and Roger Federer.

=== 2004: Injuries, year-end No. 31 ===
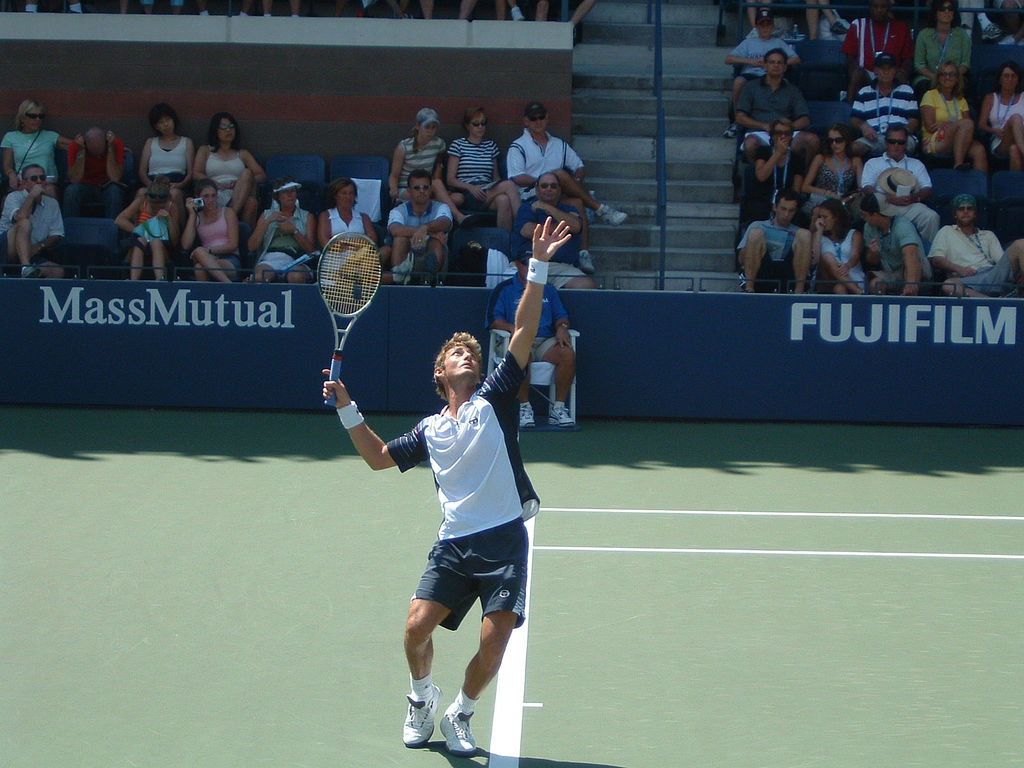
Ferrero during the 2004 US Open

Injuries began to plague Ferrero throughout 2004, and his ranking and form dipped. Despite making the Australian Open semifinals early in the year, where he lost to Roger Federer in straight sets, and the finals of Rotterdam, where he lost to Lleyton Hewitt, chicken pox kept him out for the entire month of March.

Ferrero returned to competition at the Davis Cup in a Spanish tie against the Netherlands. He won both his matches there, defeating Raemon Sluiter and Martin Verkerk. Ferrero then reached the semifinals of the Valencia Open, where he lost to Fernando Verdasco.

After a first-round loss in Monte Carlo to Alex Corretja in April, Ferrero needed another month out for rest and recuperation. On 8 May, Ferrero fell during a practice session, where he injured his ribs and his right wrist. He entered the French Open to defend his title underprepared, and lost in the second round to Igor Andreev in straight sets. At Wimbledon, Ferrero reached the third round before losing to Robby Ginepri in straight sets.

After Wimbledon, Ferrero failed to win back-to-back matches for the rest of the year. He lost in the first round of the Gstaad to Stefan Koubek, and in the first round of the Canada Masters, where he retired against Fabrice Santoro. Ferrero suffered second round exits to Tommy Robredo in Cincinnati, to Mardy Fish at the Summer Olympics, to Stefan Koubek at the US Open, to Kevin Kim at the China Open, to David Ferrer at the Grand Prix de Tennis de Lyon, and to Luis Horna in Madrid. He ended the year ranked No. 31, his first time finishing outside the top 30 in five years.

=== 2005: Recovery to year-end top 20 ===
In 2005, Ferrero hoped to return to the top of the game. However, he began his year with a loss to Jan Hernych at the Auckland Open. At the Australian Open, he met sixth-ranked Guillermo Coria in the round-of-32 and lost 6–3, 6–2, 6–1. After this loss, Ferrero dropped to No. 64 for the first time since September 1999. Ferrero's ranking then continued to plummet, eventually hitting No. 98. He recorded a first round loss at the Open 13 to eventual champion Joachim Johansson, and second round losses at the Rotterdam Open to Radek Štěpánek, at the Dubai Tennis Championships to Roger Federer, and at Indian Wells to Carlos Moya. Ferrero made a decent run at the Miami Masters, but lost in the fourth round to David Ferrer.

At the Valencia Open, Ferrero lost in the first round to Rafael Nadal. He bounced back by reaching the semifinals of Monte Carlo, where he lost to Guillermo Coria. He then upset Gastón Gaudio and Nikolay Davydenko on the way to the final of the Barcelona Open, which he lost to Rafael Nadal. These results pushed Ferrero back inside the top 50. He lost in the second round of the Estoril Open to Carlos Moyá. He ended the European clay season by reaching the third round of the Hamburg Masters, which he lost to Nikolay Davydenko, and of the French Open, where he lost to Marat Safin.

During grass season, Ferrero reached the quarterfinals of Halle, where he lost to Tommy Haas, and the fourth round of Wimbledon, where he lost to Roger Federer. He then returned to clay, and made back-to-back quarterfinals at the Swedish Open and the Croatia Open, losing to eventual champions Rafael Nadal and Guillermo Coria. Ferrero did not fare well during the North American swing, losing in the third round of Rogers Cup to Dominik Hrbatý, in the second round of Cincinnati to Andy Roddick, and in the first round of the US Open to Arnaud Clément. He bounced back by reaching the semifinals of the China Open, which he lost to Nadal.

At the Davis Cup play-offs against Italy, Ferrero lost his first match against Andreas Seppi after having been two sets up. However, he then won the decisive rubber against Daniele Bracciali in straight sets to bring Spain back into the World Group. Ferrero then competed at the Palermo Open, but lost in the quarterfinal to Tomas Behrend. He reached his second final of the year at the Vienna Open, defeating David Nalbandian and Radek Štěpánek en route before losing to Ivan Ljubičić. In his last three events of the year, Ferrero lost early: to Max Mirnyi in the first round of Madrid, to José Acasuso in the second round of the Swiss Indoors, and to Tomáš Berdych in the third round of the Paris Masters. Ferrero ended 2005 ranked No. 17.

=== 2006: First Masters final since 2003 ===
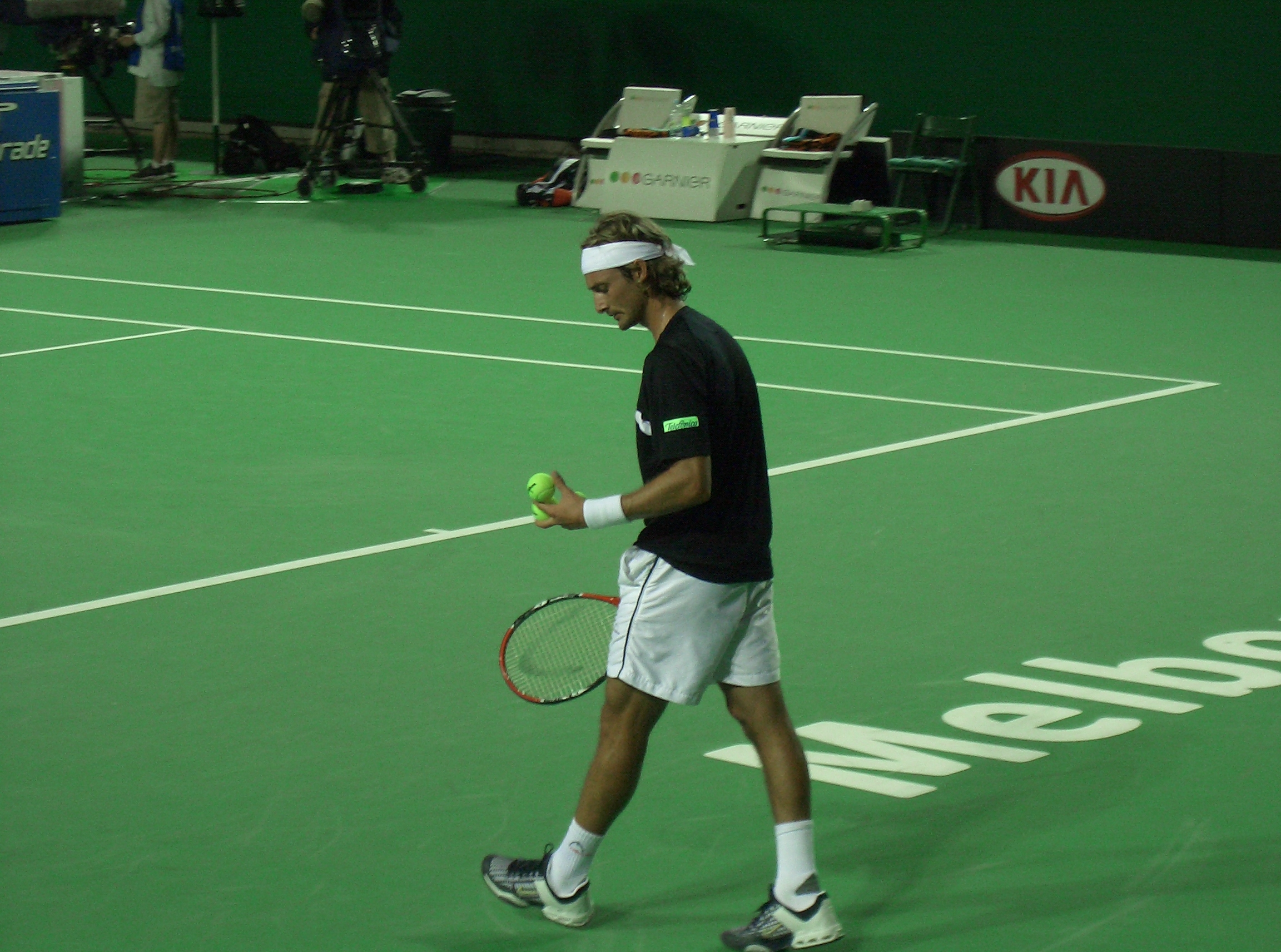
Ferrero during the 2006 Australian Open

In 2006, Ferrero once again lost his first match at the Sydney International, to Chris Guccione. At the Australian Open, he lost in the third round to Nicolas Kiefer in four sets. Ferrero reached his first semifinal of the year at the Argentina Open, losing to compatriot Carlos Moyá, but then lost in the first round of the Brasil Open to Flávio Saretta. At the first two masters events of the year, Indian Wells and Miami, Ferrero lost to Paradorn Srichaphan in the third round and Dmitry Tursunov in the second round, respectively.

Ferrero began his French Open preparation at the Valencia Open but lost in the first round to unseeded eventual champion Nicolás Almagro. At the Monte Carlo Masters, Ferrero reached the third round, where he lost to friend David Ferrer. He reached his second quarterfinal of the year at the Barcelona Open, losing once again to Almagro. Ferrero lost in the first round of Rome to Paul-Henri Mathieu, and in the third round of Hamburg to Ferrer. At the French Open, he lost in the third round to Gastón Gaudio in straight sets.

Prior to Wimbledon, Ferrero made the quarterfinals of 's-Hertogenbosch, where he lost to Florent Serra. At Wimbledon, despite leading 2 sets to love against Radek Štěpánek in the third round, he lost the match in a tight fifth set. At the Swedish Open, Ferrero reached the quarterfinals, losing to Jarkko Nieminen. He then lost in the first round of Umag to Albert Portas, and in the second round of Canada to Fernando González.

Ferrero reached his lone final of the year at the Cincinnati Masters. He notched his first top 10 win of 2006 with a win over James Blake in the second round, followed by consecutive victories against World No. 2 Rafael Nadal and No. 7 Tommy Robredo. This was the first time Ferrero had recorded a win over Nadal. He moved into a Masters final for the first time since 2003, which he lost to Andy Roddick in straight sets.

Ferrero ended the year on a five-match losing streak, beginning with a loss in the second round of the US Open to Marc Gicquel in straight sets. This was followed by losses in Thailand to Mischa Zverev, at Metz to Julien Benneteau, in Vienna to Jürgen Melzer, and in Madrid to Robin Söderling. He ended the year ranked No. 23.

=== 2007: Wimbledon quarterfinals ===
Ferrero's 2007 season began poorly, with a first-round loss at the Auckland Open to Nicolás Massú and a second-round loss at the Australian Open to Danai Udomchoke. Ferrero bounced back by reaching the final of the Brasil Open, which he lost to Guillermo Cañas. He was eliminated in the round robin stage of Buenos Aires, and the semifinals of the Mexican Open, where he lost to Carlos Moyá. Ferrero reached the fourth round of Indian Wells, where he lost to Rafael Nadal (6-1, 6-1). He lost in the second round of Miami to Cañas and in the Valencia Open to Alberto Martín. He bounced back temporarily by reaching the semifinals of the Monte Carlo Masters, where he lost to Roger Federer. However, he fell in the second rounds of Barcelona and Rome to Potito Starace and Pablo Andújar respectively, and in the third rounds of Hamburg and Roland-Garros, to Federer and to Mikhail Youzhny.

Despite losing in the first round of 's-Hertogenbosch to Carlos Berlocq, Ferrero was able to reach the quarterfinals of Wimbledon for the first time, defeating No. 9 James Blake in the third round and earning his first top 10 win of the year. While he then lost to World No. 1 Federer in four sets, this result meant Ferrero had reached the quarterfinals of all four slams. Ferrero backed this result up by reaching the quarterfinal at the Stuttgart Open, which he lost to Feliciano López. He was then upset in the first round of the Austrian Open by Andreas Seppi.

Ferrero's North American swing was a disappointment. Despite making it to the third round of Cincinnati, he lost in the first round of Canada to Lleyton Hewitt, and in the first round of the US Open to Feliciano López. He bounced back by reaching the semifinals of the Vienna, losing to Stanislas Wawrinka, and the third round of Madrid, losing to Novak Djokovic. Ferrero's final match of the year was a first-round loss to Marcos Baghdatis at the Paris Masters. He ended the year ranked No. 24.

=== 2008: Injuries, year-end No. 55 ===
Ferrero made a strong start to 2008, reaching his first and last final of the year at the Auckland Open, where he lost to Philipp Kohlschreiber. He then defeated David Nalbandian to advance to the fourth round of the Australian Open, where he lost to David Ferrer in four sets. Ferrero then suffered three consecutive losses: to Nicolas Mahut at the second round of the Open 13, in Rotterdam to Teymuraz Gabashvili, and in Dubai to Andy Roddick. He reached the fourth round in Indian Wells, where Nalbandian defeated him. In Miami, Ferrero lost to Tomáš Berdych in the third round, and in Valencia to Marat Safin in the first round.

Ferrero reached the third round of the Monte Carlo Masters, where he lost to World No. 2 Rafael Nadal in straight sets (6–4, 6–1). Less than a month later, however, Ferrero stunned Nadal in straight sets (7–5, 6–1) in the second round of the Rome Masters. This was Ferrero's second career victory against Nadal in eight meetings, and ended Nadal's streak of seventeen successive match wins in Rome. It was widely publicised that Nadal had been injured during this match, despite the fact that Ferrero had also been struggling with a string of injuries. Ferrero lost to Stan Wawrinka in the next round.

Ferrero then played the French Open, where he won the first set of his first round match against Marcos Daniel before retiring due to a leg injury. The next tournament he entered was Wimbledon, where he retired in the second round against Mischa Zverev due to a hamstring injury. Ferrero missed the next three months of competitive play with a shoulder injury. He returned to the China Open where he made quarterfinals, losing to eventual champion Andy Roddick. His next tournaments were the Vienna Open, where he lost in the second round to Jürgen Melzer, and the Grand Prix de Tennis de Lyon, where he lost in the quarterfinals to Jo-Wilfried Tsonga. Ferrero ended the year ranked No. 55, his lowest year–end ranking since 1998.

=== 2009: Return to the top 20 ===
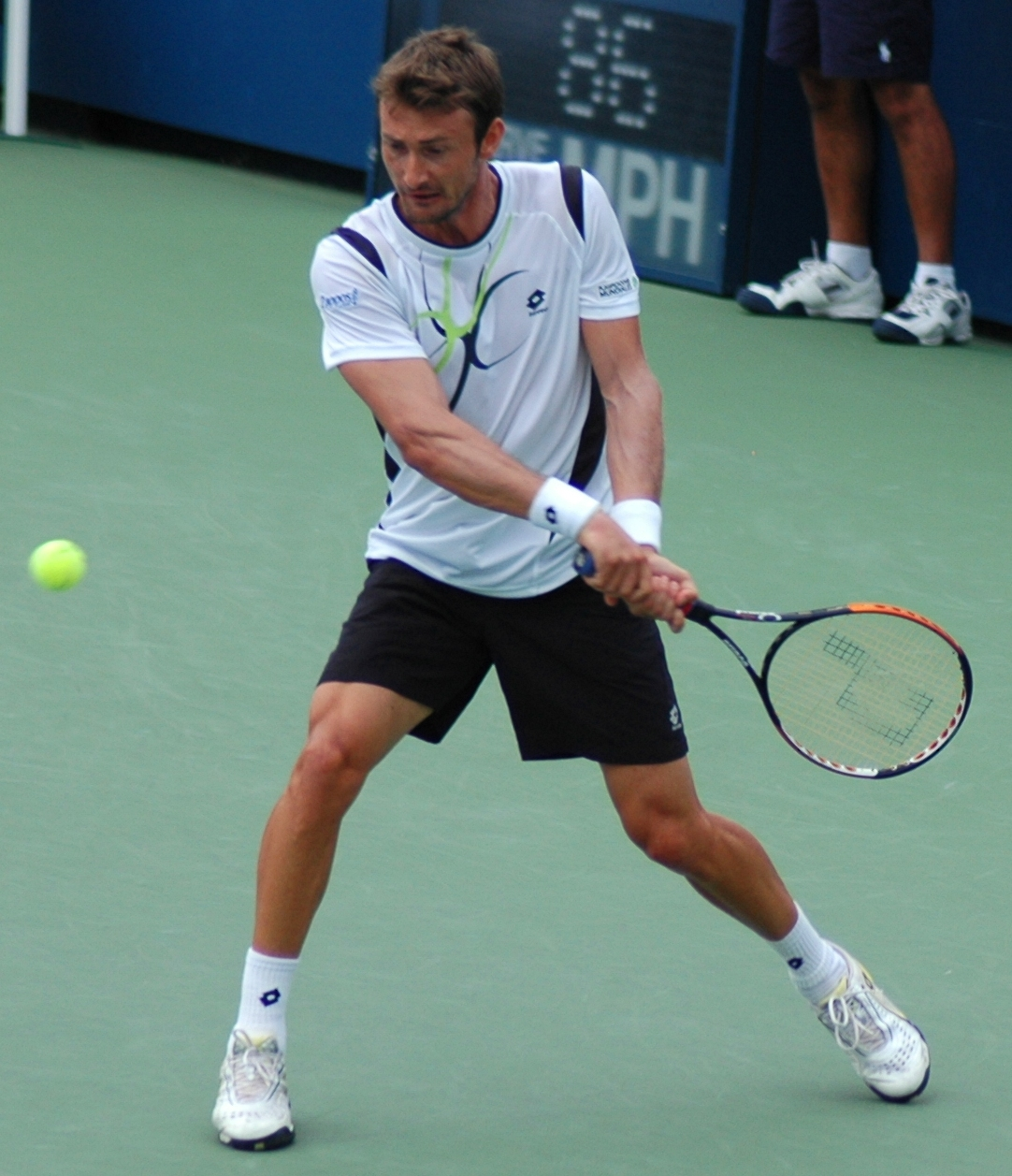
Ferrero during the 2009 US Open

Ferrero began the year badly, with early losses in the second round of the Auckland Open to Philipp Kohlschreiber, in the first round of the Brisbane International to Florent Serra, and in the first round of the Australian Open to Fabrice Santoro. With this string of losses, Ferrero dropped out of the top 100 for the first time in almost 10 years, falling to No. 101. However, he then reached the quarterfinals of the Brasil Open, where he lost to Thomaz Bellucci, and of Buenos Aires, where he retired against David Nalbandian with a leg injury. In March, Ferrero captured his first singles title since 2003 by defeating fifth–seeded Serra in the final of the Grand Prix Hassan II in Casablanca, Morocco.

Ferrero was unable to sustain this success throughout the rest of the clay court season. He lost in the first round of the Barcelona Open to Igor Kunitsyn and failed to qualify for the Rome Masters. He then suffered second–round losses in Portugal to Nikolay Davydenko, in Madrid to Fernando Verdasco, and at Roland-Garros to Philipp Kohlschreiber.

Ferrero launched a surprising comeback during the grass season. He reached the semifinals of the Queen's Club Championships, where he lost to Andy Murray, and the quarterfinals at Wimbledon, equalling his best result there by defeating tenth seed Fernando González and seventh seed Gilles Simon before losing to Andy Murray in straight sets. These performances saw Ferrero climb from No. 90 to No. 37 in the span of a month. He then reached the finals of the Umag Open, where he lost 6-3, 6-0 to Nikolay Davydenko.

At the Washington Open, Ferrero advanced to the third round, beating Tommy Robredo before a loss to Tommy Haas. Ferrero qualified to play the Canada Masters. He defeated Lleyton Hewitt in the first round in straight sets, ending Hewitt's three-match winning streak against him. He then defeated 13th seed Gaël Monfils, before losing once again to Andy Murray. Ferrero lost in the first round of the Cincinnati Masters to Marin Čilić. He began his campaign at the US Open by defeating Fabrice Santoro in what would be Santoro's last US Open match. In the second round, Ferrero mounted a remarkable comeback from two sets down for the third time in his career to defeat Philipp Petzschner in five sets. Ferrero lost in the fourth round to eventual champion Juan Martín del Potro in straight sets. With this result, Ferrero managed to re-enter the top 20, having been ranked No. 115 just five months earlier.

At the China Open, Ferrero lost to Fernando Verdasco in the second round. He then entered the Shanghai Masters, where he missed out on being seeded by one ranking spot. He was crushed in the first round by the 13th seed Radek Štěpánek, winning only seven points in the second set. He also lost in the first round of the Stockholm Open, to Marcos Baghdatis. Ferrero then competed in the Valencia Open but was defeated by Pablo Cuevas in the first round in a three–set battle, after serving for the set at 5–3 in the second set. He ended the year ranked No. 23.

=== 2010: Three titles ===
Ferrero had a bad start to the 2010 season. He began the year once again at the Auckland Open, where he retired against Michael Lammer with an injury, trailing 1–3 in the second round. At the Australian Open, Ferrero suffered a shock defeat to Ivan Dodig, having been two-sets-to-love up and seemingly cruising to victory.

As the first seed at the Brasil Open, Ferrero rediscovered his form. He crushed Łukasz Kubot in the final in 61 minutes, conceding one of his service games but breaking all of Kubot's to win 6–1, 6–0. At Buenos Aires, Ferrero defeated top seed David Ferrer in the final to take his second title in a row and extend his winning streak to ten matches. This victory also raised his ranking to No. 16. At the Mexican Open in Acapulco, Ferrero defeated Diego Junqueira, Igor Andreev, defending champion Nicolás Almagro and Juan Mónaco to reach his third consecutive final. He then lost to David Ferrer in three sets. Both players admitted that Ferrero's fatigue played a major role in the final set. Following this tournament, Ferrero became World No. 14, his highest ranking since 11 October 2004.

Ferrero defeated Daniel Köllerer in the second round of Indian Wells to claim his first hard-court victory of the season, losing only eight points on serve. He lost to Juan Mónaco in the third round in a match that lasted over three hours. At the Miami Masters, Ferrero lost in the round of 16 to Jo-Wilfried Tsonga. At the Monte Carlo Masters, he defeated Marcel Granollers, Benjamin Becker, and Tsonga before losing to Rafael Nadal in straight sets in the quarterfinals. At the Barcelona Open, Ferrero was upset by Thiemo de Bakker in the third round. At the Rome Masters, his form continued to dip as he suffered a shock loss to qualifier Santiago Giraldo in the first round. Ferrero went into the French Open seeded 16th and was tipped by some to make a good run there. However, he was upset in the third round by Robby Ginepri. After coming back from a two-set deficit and being a break of serve up in the decider, he lost in the fifth set.

Ferrero's grass season was disappointing. He lost to lucky loser Dominik Meffert in the first round of Halle. His bad form continued at Wimbledon, where he lost to Xavier Malisse in five sets in the first round. He returned to clay at the Stuttgart Open, where he lost to Albert Montañés for the first time in six meetings in the semifinals. He was upset by Florian Mayer in the quarterfinals of Hamburg. Ferrero then won his third title of the year at the Umag Open, beating Pablo Cuevas, Alexandr Dolgopolov, Andreas Seppi, and Potito Starace in the final.

Ferrero missed the Canada and Cincinnati Masters due to a knee injury. He returned to play at the US Open, where he defeated Martin Kližan and Ricardo Mello in straight sets, but lost to Jürgen Melzer in straight sets in the third round. He missed the rest of the season due to knee and wrist injuries, for which he received surgery in October. He therefore ended the year ranked No. 28.

=== 2011: Final ATP title ===
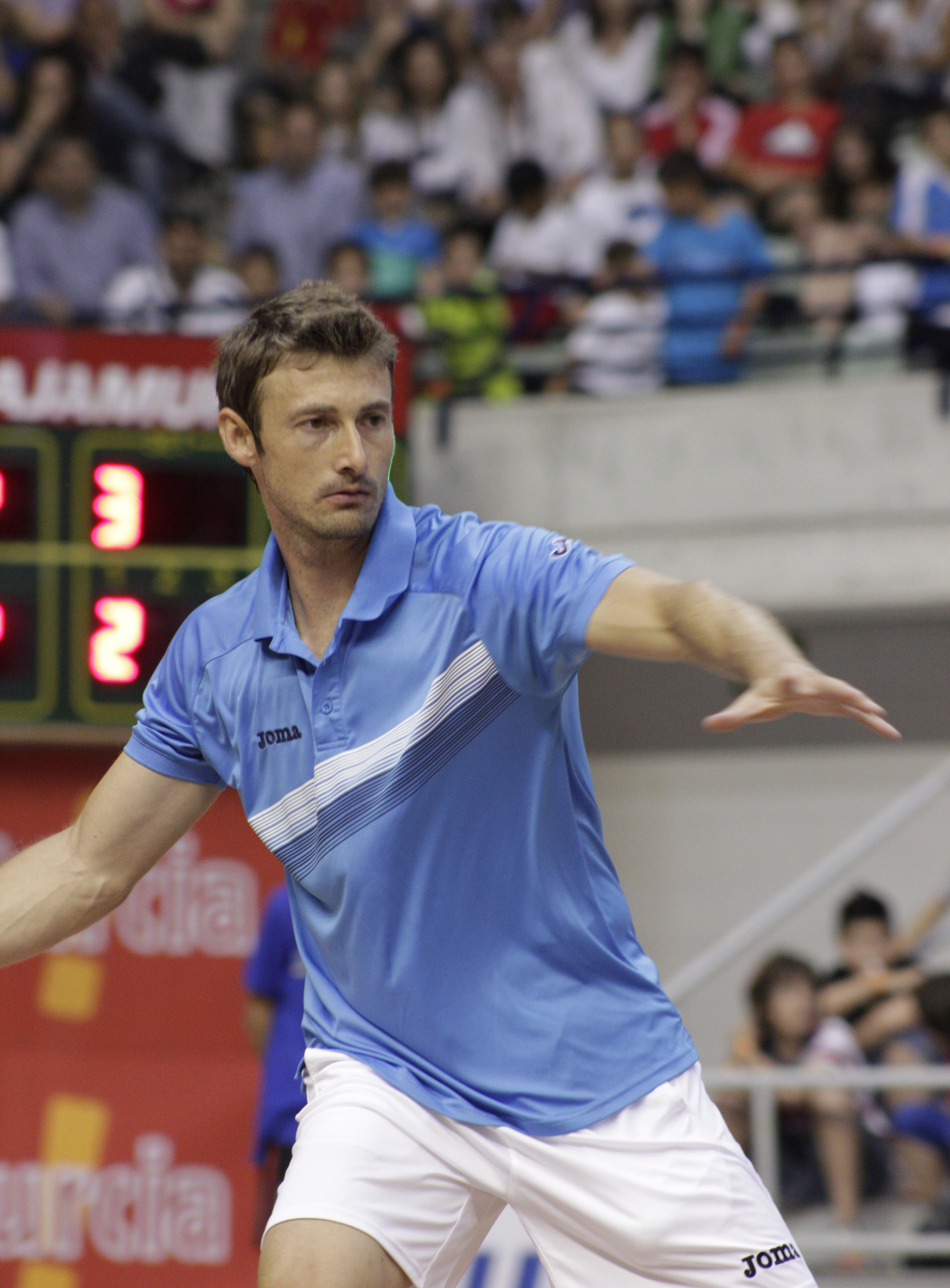
Juan Carlos Ferrero at the 2011 Barcelona Open

In 2011, Ferrero withdrew from the Auckland Open and the Australian Open. As the defending champion, he withdrew from the Brasil Open and Buenos Aires. He also withdrew from Mexico, Indian Wells, Miami, and Monte Carlo, as the recovery from his wrist and knee surgery took longer than expected. Ferrero made his return at the Barcelona Open, where he defeated Xavier Malisse, Mischa Zverev, and Simone Vagnozzi, but lost in the quarterfinals to Nicolás Almagro. At the Madrid Open, he lost in the first round to Thiemo de Bakker, after which he indicated that the end of his tennis career might be near. He missed the Rome Masters, French Open, and Wimbledon due to the same injury, and his ranking dropped to No. 85.

Ferrero returned to competition at the Stuttgart Open. There, he defeated Bastian Knittel, Mikhail Youzhny, Marcel Granollers, Federico Delbonis, and straight-setted Pablo Andújar in the final to capture the title. Ferrero then went to Hamburg, where he lost in the first round to Cedrik-Marcel Stebe. As the defending champion in Umag, he reached the semifinals, where he lost to eventual champion Alexandr Dolgopolov. He lost in Canada to Ernests Gulbis and in Cincinnati to Feliciano López, both in the first round.

Ferrero's next tournament was the US Open, where he defeated Pablo Andújar in the first round in five sets. In the second round, he defeated Frenchman Gaël Monfils in an electrifying five-set match. He was drawn against Marcel Granollers in the third round, who retired in the second set of the match. In the fourth round, Ferrero lost to Janko Tipsarević in four sets. At the China Open, Ferrero lost in the quarterfinals to Jo-Wilfried Tsonga. He reached the third round at the Shanghai Masters, where he was defeated by David Ferrer after having wasted three match points in the second set. At the Valencia Open, Ferrero lost in the quarterfinals to Juan Mónaco. His final tournament of the year was the Paris Masters, where he lost in the first round to Nicolas Mahut. He ended the year ranked No. 50.

=== 2012: Final season ===
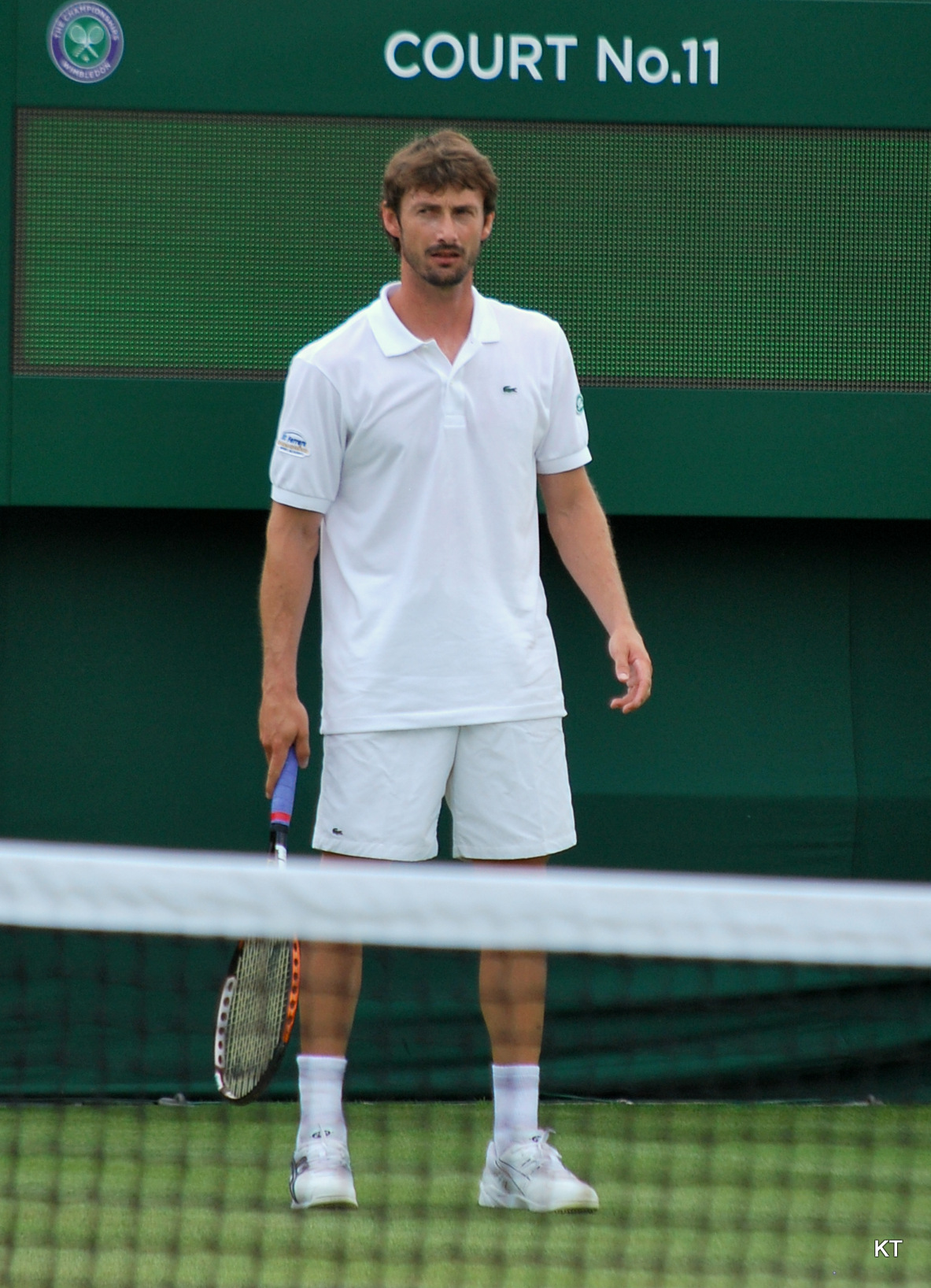
Juan Carlos Ferrero at the 2012 Wimbledon Championships

Ferrero began his 2012 season with a loss to Benoît Paire in Sydney. He entered the Australian Open, where he lost in the first round to Viktor Troicki in five sets, after failing to convert a match point in the fourth. After the match, Ferrero was fined $1,500 for "audible obscenities" on court.

Ferrero represented Spain in the Davis Cup for the last time in a tie against Kazakhstan, where he defeated Mikhail Kukushkin in five sets. He then played a disappointing Golden Swing, losing in the first round at all three tournaments. At the Brasil Open he lost to Leonardo Mayer, in Buenos Aires to Kei Nishikori, and at the Mexican Open to Stan Wawrinka. Ferrero then missed three months of competition due to a wrist injury.

Ferrero returned at the Madrid Masters, where he lost in the first round to qualifier Igor Andreev. At the Rome Masters, Ferrero beat Kevin Anderson and Gaël Monfils, his second and third wins of the year. However, in the third round, he lost to Roger Federer in three sets. Ferrero then entered the Nice French Riviera Open. He beat Robin Haase after saving a match point, but lost to Brazilian qualifier Thomaz Bellucci in the second round in straight sets. At the last French Open of his career, Ferrero won his first round match against French wild card Jonathan Dasnières de Veigy, before a second round loss to Marin Čilić in straight sets.

Ferrero did not play a warm-up tournament before Wimbledon, where he lost in the first round in straight sets to defending champion and world No. 1 Novak Djokovic. He then lost in the first round of Umag. On 12 September, Ferrero announced that he would officially retire from professional tennis after the Valencia Open in October. He stated that "The Valencia Open 500 will be my last tournament, in the best possible scenario. This season injuries have prevented me from playing regularly and it was a tough year as I realised on the court that I did not have the same ambition after 14 years at the top level." Ferrero played his final singles match in the first round of the Valencia Open, where he lost to fellow Spaniard Nicolás Almagro in straight sets. His retirement ceremony took place at the tournament.

=== 2017 ===
In 2017 it was announced that Ferrero would return to the ATP Tour to play in the Barcelona doubles draw alongside Pablo Carreño Busta. However, this would be his only tournament, and they lost in the first round.

== Davis Cup ==
Ferrero was a key player in Spain's Davis Cup team throughout his career.

=== 2000 ===
Ferrero made his Davis Cup debut in a quarterfinal tie against Russia in 2000, where he won both his matches, against Yevgeny Kafelnikov and Marat Safin, in straight sets. In the semifinals, Ferrero defeated the American Vince Spadea in three sets, helping to send Spain into their first Davis Cup final in 33 years.

In the final, Spain faced Australia on home territory in Barcelona on clay. On the first day, Albert Costa lost the first singles match to Lleyton Hewitt, but Ferrero levelled the score by defeating Patrick Rafter in the second match. After the Spanish doubles team won the third match, Ferrero was called up again in singles to face Hewitt. He won the first set and saved match points to steal the second in a tiebreak. After losing the third set, he regrouped and won the match 6–2, 7–6^{(7–5)}, 4–6, 6–4. The remaining singles match was called off; Spain claimed its first Davis Cup. Ferrero would cite this years later as the victory he was most proud of in his career.

=== 2001 ===
In the first round of the 2001 Davis Cup, Spain were drawn against the Netherlands, who chose to hold the tie on carpet. Ferrero lost his singles match in five sets to Raemon Sluiter, a last-minute addition to the Dutch team. Generally ill-equipped to play on carpet, Spain proceeded to lose the tie 1–4. Spain then had to compete in the qualifying rounds for the Davis Cup World Group, where Ferrero made up for this loss by defeating Oleg Ogorodov of Uzbekistan in straight sets.

=== 2002 ===
Ferrero joined the Spanish team for the first round of the Davis Cup again in 2002, where they were drawn against Morocco. He defeated Hicham Arazi in straight sets, but lost to Younes El Aynaoui in five sets, 6–7^{(2–7)}, 0–6, 6–3, 6–0, 3–6. He did not join Spain for their quarterfinal due to a stress fracture picked up at the Miami Open. Spain lost to the United States.

=== 2003 ===
Ferrero played in the first round of the 2003 Davis Cup, comfortably winning both of his matches against Christophe Rochus and Kristof Vliegen of Belgium. In the quarterfinal, he played and won one match against Croatia's Mario Ančić. Ferrero arrived at Spain's semifinal against Argentina as newly crowned world No. 1. He duly defeated Gastón Gaudio, losing only four games across three sets. Ferrero hadn't dropped a single set in the Davis Cup that year, heading into his second semifinal match against Agustín Calleri. Calleri, however, stunned Ferrero, hitting 109 winners to win the match in straight sets.

Spain nevertheless made the final, where they once again met Australia. Spain had played the preceding three rounds on their favourite surface, clay, but faced Australia on grass. Ferrero lost his first singles match to Lleyton Hewitt in five sets. He had led the match 2–1 before he was bagelled in a fourth-set tiebreak, and broken twice to lose the fifth set. With Spain trailing two matches to one, Ferrero was tasked with playing a second singles rubber against Mark Philippoussis. Having lost the first two sets, Ferrero won the third and fourth sets 6–1, 6–2 after Philippoussis tore his pectoral muscle. Following the fourth set, Ferrero called for a physio; Philippoussis subsequently did the same, and the long break wrecked Ferrero's momentum. He was bagelled by Philippoussis in the fifth set. Australia claimed the Davis Cup.

=== 2004 ===
Ferrero was unable to join Spain for their first round tie against the Czech Republic in 2004, due to injury. As Spain's other top player, Carlos Moyá, was also injured, teenager Rafael Nadal was called up for the first time and contributed to a narrow 3–2 victory. Ferrero rejoined Spain for their quarterfinal against the Netherlands, where he defeated both Raemon Sluiter (in three sets) and Martin Verkerk (in five). In the semifinal against Argentina, he won his only match against Fabrice Santoro in four sets.

However, Ferrero was dropped from Spain's line-up the day before the finals against the United States began, in favour of Rafael Nadal. Ferrero told media, "It was certainly a surprise not to be picked. Physically I am at 100 percent and I have had three days of good training. Obviously I am not jumping up and down with happiness, but you have to take things as they come." Ferrero was then drafted at the last minute to play doubles alongside Tommy Robrero; they lost to American doubles specialists Bob Bryan and Mike Bryan 6–0, 6–3, 6–2. Ferrero held serve once. Spain still managed to secure the Davis Cup for the second time, due to singles wins from Carlos Moya and Nadal. After the tournament, Nadal denied rampant media speculation that there was bad blood between him and Ferrero.

=== 2005 ===
Spain lost 4–1 against Slovakia in the first round of the 2005 Davis Cup. Ferrero, who did not play the tie, was publicly critical of the team's leadership. He rejoined the team for qualification play-offs that September, where he lost his first match against Andreas Seppi, but won his second match against Daniele Bracciali in straight sets to save Spain's place in the World Group for 2006.

=== 2009 ===
Ferrero did not represent Spain at the Davis Cup again until 2009, when Nadal's injury sidelined him from playing. In the quarterfinal tie against Germany, Ferrero played and won a decisive fifth rubber against Andreas Beck in straight sets. In the semifinal against Israel, Ferrero won the second rubber against Dudi Sela, 6–4, 6–2, 6–0. This put Spain on track to win the Davis Cup for the second consecutive year, becoming the first nation to do so since Sweden in 1998. Nadal returned in time to play in the final, meaning that Ferrero was not selected to do so. He attended all the live rubbers as a reserve player during the first two days of the final.

=== Involvement as coach ===
Ferrero returned to the Davis Cup in his capacity as Carlos Alcaraz's coach in 2022 and 2024, the second occasion marking the occasion of Rafael Nadal's retirement.

== Coaching career ==
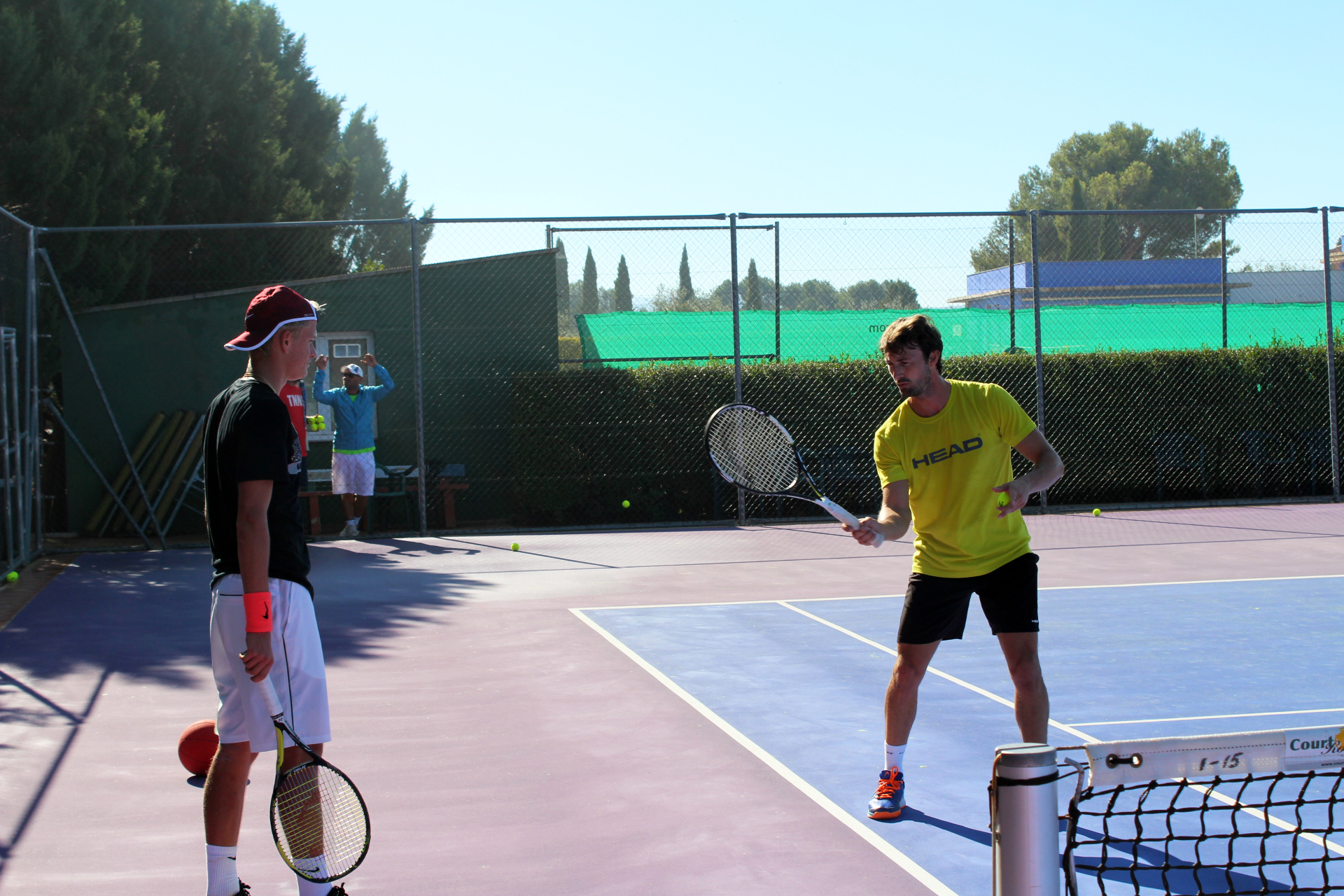
Ferrero and Nicola Kuhn at the Ferrero Tennis Academy in 2015

=== Alexander Zverev ===
In July 2017, Ferrero became coach to then-world No. 11 Alexander Zverev. Immediately after their partnership started, Zverev won titles in Washington and Canada. Ferrero praised Zverev's tennis, but said mentally he was about a "five out of ten" and required development. Zverev's results for the rest of the year were somewhat disappointing: he failed to win another title; crashed out of the US Open in the second round; and lost in the group stage of the ATP Finals.

At the 2018 Australian Open, Zverev was upset in the third round by world No. 59 Hyeon Chung. Zverev had led two sets to one before a collapse in which he won only five points and was bagelled in the fifth set. Zverev and Ferrero's collaboration ended shortly afterwards, in February. Zverev attributed this to a disagreement at the Australian Open, while Ferrero attributed it to Zverev's lack of professionalism.

=== Carlos Alcaraz ===
In 2019, Ferrero began coaching fifteen-year-old Carlos Alcaraz, a fellow Spaniard, having cited his interest in "building" a player from the ground up. The partnership was an immediate success. Ferrero was nominated for the ATP Coach of the Year Award four times, winning it in 2022 and 2025 (latterly alongside Samuel López). Alcaraz said he considered Ferrero a "second father".

The partnership lasted seven years and produced 24 tournament wins on the ATP Tour. They won six Grand Slam titles: the US Open in 2022 and 2025, Wimbledon in 2023 and 2024, and the French Open in 2024 and 2025. They also won eight Masters 1000 titles: Miami and Madrid in 2022, Indian Wells and Madrid in 2023, Indian Wells in 2024, and Monte-Carlo, Rome and Cincinnati in 2025. Alcaraz also became the youngest ATP world No. 1 in the Open Era, nineteen years after Ferrero had himself clinched the top ranking.

In December 2024, Samuel López, a former member of Ferrero's own coaching team, joined Alcaraz's team to work under Ferrero as a second coach. Ferrero and López split coaching duties throughout the 2025 season, with both coaches present at all four slams. On 17 December 2025, it was unexpectedly announced that Ferrero and Alcaraz had ended their partnership despite a highly successful season, with López set to remain. No reason was provided, but Ferrero said, "I wish I could have continued." He later gave several interviews reiterating his disappointment.

=== Ángel Ayora ===
Following his split from Alcaraz, Ferrero decided to take a break from the tennis coaching circuit. In January 2026, he announced he was taking on a new role as a mental performance and professional development coach to Spanish golf player Ángel Ayora.

Ben Shelton

It was announced in October 2026 that Ferrero will start coaching Ben Shelton.

== Playing style, team, and equipment ==
Ferrero was an all-court player who was recognised particularly for his powerful forehand. He was also noted for his agility and high peak foot speed on court. This speed, together with his slender physical build, earned him the nickname "the Mosquito". While Ferrero was best known as a clay court player during his prime, he achieved strong results on all surfaces.

Ferrero was coached by Antonio Martínez Cascales (from 1989) and Salvador Navarro (from May 2008). His fitness trainer was Miguel Maeso. He was trained by Cascales at the academy in Alicante, which would eventually be renamed for, and taken over by, Ferrero.

Ferrero was sponsored by Nike, Sergio Tacchini, Asics, and Lotto Sport Italia. In 2010, he signed an endorsement deal with Joma. In 2012, he signed with Lacoste to supply his clothing. He used Prince Sports for racquets, playing with a Prince EXO3 Tour 100 Mid+ (16x18) model, before later switching to Head. In 2024, Ferrero announced new endorsement deals for himself and his academy with Nike and Babolat.

== Career statistics ==
=== Grand Slam tournament performance timeline ===
Key
W	F	SF	QF	#R	RR	Q#	DNQ	A	NH

(W) winner; (F) finalist; (SF) semifinalist; (QF) quarterfinalist; (#R) rounds 4, 3, 2, 1; (RR) round-robin stage; (Q#) qualification round; (DNQ) did not qualify; (A) absent; (NH) not held; (SR) strike rate (events won / competed); (W–L) win–loss record.

Tournament	1999	2000	2001	2002	2003	2004	2005	2006	2007	2008	2009	2010	2011	2012	SR	W–L
Australian Open	A	3R	2R	A	QF	SF	3R	3R	2R	4R	1R	1R	A	1R	0 / 11	20–11
French Open	Q1	SF	SF	F	W	2R	3R	3R	3R	1R	2R	3R	A	2R	1 / 12	34–11
Wimbledon	A	A	3R	2R	4R	3R	4R	3R	QF	2R	QF	1R	A	1R	0 / 11	22–11
US Open	1R	4R	3R	3R	F	2R	1R	2R	1R	A	4R	3R	4R	A	0 / 12	23–12
Win–loss	0–1	10–3	10–4	9–3	20–3	9–4	7–4	7–4	7–4	4–3	8–4	4–4	3–1	1–3	1 / 46	99–45

=== Grand Slam tournament finals: 3 (1 title, 2 runners-up) ===
Result	Year	Championship	Surface	Opponent	Score
Loss	2002	French Open	Clay	(Spain) Albert Costa	1–6, 0–6, 6–4, 3–6
Win	2003	French Open	Clay	(Netherlands) Martin Verkerk	6–1, 6–3, 6–2
Loss	2003	US Open	Hard	(United States) Andy Roddick	3–6, 6–7^{(2–7)}, 3–6

== See also ==
- List of ATP number 1 ranked singles players
- List of Grand Slam men's singles champions

== Notes ==
Sporting positions
Preceded by Andre Agassi	World No. 1; 8 September 2003 – 2 November 2003	Succeeded by Andy Roddick
Awards and achievements
Preceded by Marat Safin	ATP Newcomer of the Year; 1999	Succeeded by Olivier Rochus
Preceded by Alberto García	Spanish Sportsman of the Year; 2003	Succeeded by David Cal
Preceded by Facundo Lugones	ATP Coach of the Year; 2022	Succeeded by Darren Cahill; Simone Vagnozzi
Preceded by Michael Russell	ATP Coach of the Year; 2025 (with Samuel López)	Succeeded by Incumbent
