= Tomáš Zíb =

Czech tennis player (born 1976)

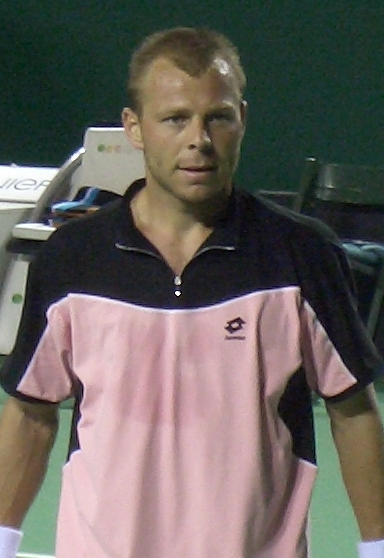
- Country (sports): Czech Republic
- Residence: Prague, Czech Republic
- Born: 31 January 1976 (age 49); Písek, Czechoslovakia
- Height: 1.77 m (5 ft 9 1/2 in)
- Turned pro: 1995
- Retired: 2012
- Plays: Right-handed (two-handed backhand)
- Prize money: $1,395,816

Singles
- Career record: 43–97 (at ATP Tour and Grand Slam level, and in Davis Cup)
- Career titles: 0
- Highest ranking: No. 51 (25 July 2005)

Grand Slam singles results
- Australian Open: 2R (2005)
- French Open: 1R (2000, 2005, 2006)
- Wimbledon: 2R (2005, 2006, 2007)
- US Open: 1R (1999, 2004, 2005, 2008)

Doubles
- Career record: 20–38 (at ATP Tour and Grand Slam level, and in Davis Cup)
- Career titles: 1
- Highest ranking: No. 65 (13 February 2006)

Grand Slam doubles results
- Australian Open: 1R (2005, 2006)
- French Open: 2R (2005)
- Wimbledon: 2R (2005, 2006)
- US Open: 1R (2005)
- Last updated on: 16 January 2022.

Tomáš Zíb (born 31 January 1976), is a retired male tennis player from the Czech Republic. He reached a career-high singles ranking of World No. 51 in July 2005. Currently he is active conducting tennis lessons in Singapore.

== ATP career finals ==
=== Doubles: 2 (1 title, 1 runner-up) ===
Legend Grand Slam Tournaments (0–0) ATP World Tour Finals (0–0) ATP Masters Series (0–0) ATP Championship Series (0–1) ATP World Series (1–0)	Finals by surface Hard (0–0) Clay (1–1) Grass (0–0) Carpet (0–0)	Finals by setting Outdoors (1–1) Indoors (0–0)

Result	W–L	Date	Tournament	Tier	Surface	Partner	Opponents	Score
Loss	0–1	Feb 2005	Acapulco, Mexico	Championship Series	Clay	(Czech Republic) Jiří Vaněk	(Spain) David Ferrer (Spain) Santiago Ventura	6–4, 1–6, 4–6
Win	1–1	Apr 2006	Valencia, Spain	International Series	Clay	(Czech Republic) David Škoch	(Czech Republic) Lukáš Dlouhý (Czech Republic) Pavel Vízner	6–4, 6–3

== ATP Challenger and ITF Futures finals ==
=== Singles: 17 (8–9) ===
Legend ATP Challenger (7–9) ITF Futures (1–0)	Finals by surface Hard (1–4) Clay (7–4) Grass (0–0) Carpet (0–1)

Result	W–L	Date	Tournament	Tier	Surface	Opponent	Score
Win	1–0	Jul 1998	Tampere, Finland	Challenger	Clay	(Finland) Tommi Lenho	4–6, 6–2, 7–6
Win	2–0	Aug 1998	Istanbul, Turkey	Challenger	Hard	(Czech Republic) Petr Luxa	4–6, 6–2, 6–1
Loss	2–1	Jun 1999	Fürth, Germany	Challenger	Clay	(Haiti) Ronald Agénor	2–6, 6–7
Win	3–1	Jul 1999	Graz, Austria	Challenger	Clay	(Spain) Juan Carlos Ferrero	7–6, 6–1
Win	4–1	Apr 2002	Germany F1, Riemerling	Futures	Clay	(Germany) Jan Weinzierl	6–4, 6–1
Win	5–1	Jun 2002	Eisenach, Germany	Challenger	Clay	(France) Olivier Mutis	7–6^{(7–5)}, 6–2
Loss	5–2	Jul 2002	Oberstaufen, Germany	Challenger	Clay	(France) Nicolas Thomann	6–7^{(6–8)}, 4–6
Win	6–2	Jul 2002	Hilversum, Netherlands	Challenger	Clay	(France) Florent Serra	7–6^{(7–3)}, 6–1
Loss	6–3	Jul 2003	Košice, Slovakia	Challenger	Clay	(Spain) Rubén Ramírez Hidalgo	3–6, 6–4, 4–6
Loss	6–4	Aug 2003	Segovia, Spain	Challenger	Hard	(Spain) Rafael Nadal	2–6, 6–7^{(1–7)}
Win	7–4	Aug 2004	Poznań, Poland	Challenger	Clay	(Argentina) Juan Pablo Brzezicki	6–7^{(4–7)}, 7–6^{(7–3)}, 6–3
Win	8–4	Apr 2005	Paget, Bermuda	Challenger	Clay	(Belgium) Kristof Vliegen	6–7^{(8–10)}, 7–6^{(8–6)}, 6–1
Loss	8–5	Jan 2006	Heilbronn, Germany	Challenger	Carpet	(Sweden) Robin Söderling	1–6, 4–6
Loss	8–6	Feb 2006	Wrocław, Poland	Challenger	Hard	(Czech Republic) Lukáš Dlouhý	6–7^{(2–7)}, 6–2, 3–6
Loss	8–7	Nov 2006	Helsinki, Finland	Challenger	Hard	(Germany) Michael Berrer	2–6, 6–3, 3–6
Loss	8–8	Feb 2007	Wrocław, Poland	Challenger	Hard	(Austria) Werner Eschauer	7–5, 4–6, 4–6
Loss	8–9	Sep 2007	Trnava, Slovakia	Challenger	Clay	(Czech Republic) Jan Hernych	3–6, 6–3, 4–6

=== Doubles: 11 (4–7) ===
Legend ATP Challenger (4–6) ITF Futures (0–1)	Finals by surface Hard (2–2) Clay (2–4) Grass (0–0) Carpet (0–1)

Result	W–L	Date	Tournament	Tier	Surface	Partner	Opponents	Score
Win	1–0	Aug 1998	Segovia, Spain	Challenger	Hard	(Czech Republic) Radek Štěpánek	(Spain) José Antonio Conde (Spain) Ruben Fernandez-Gil	6–3, 7–6
Loss	1–1	Feb 2002	Belgrade, Serbia	Challenger	Carpet	(Czech Republic) Jaroslav Levinský	(Croatia) Lovro Zovko (Socialist Federal Republic of Yugoslavia) Dušan Vemić	walkover
Loss	1–2	May 2002	Germany F2, Eslingen	Futures	Clay	(Czech Republic) Pavel Šnobel	(Sweden) Kalle Flygt (Sweden) Nicklas Timfjord	4–6, 3–6
Loss	1–3	Aug 2002	Bronx, United States	Challenger	Hard	(Slovakia) Karol Beck	(United Kingdom) Jamie Delgado (United Kingdom) Arvind Parmar	6–7^{(6–8)}, 1–6
Loss	1–4	Sep 2002	Istanbul, Turkey	Challenger	Hard	(Israel) Noam Behr	(North Macedonia) Aleksandar Kitinov (Croatia) Lovro Zovko	6–4, 4–6, 2–6
Loss	1–5	May 2004	Ostrava, Czech Republic	Challenger	Clay	(Poland) Łukasz Kubot	(Finland) Tuomas Ketola (Czech Republic) Petr Pála	4–6, 4–6
Loss	1–6	Apr 2005	Paget, Bermuda	Challenger	Clay	(Czech Republic) Michal Tabara	(Australia) Jordan Kerr (Argentina) Sebastián Prieto	walkover
Win	2–6	May 2008	Ostrava, Czech Republic	Challenger	Clay	(Ukraine) Sergiy Stakhovsky	(Czech Republic) Jan Hernych (Slovakia) Igor Zelenay	7–6^{(8–6)}, 3–6, [14–12]
Loss	2–7	May 2008	Zagreb, Croatia	Challenger	Clay	(Ukraine) Sergiy Stakhovsky	(Croatia) Ivan Dodig (Brazil) Júlio Silva	4–6, 6–7^{(1–7)}
Win	3–7	Aug 2008	Bronx, United States	Challenger	Hard	(Czech Republic) Lukáš Dlouhý	(Germany) Andreas Beck (Austria) Martin Fischer	3–6, 6–4, [11–9]
Win	4–7	Sep 2008	Düsseldorf, Germany	Challenger	Clay	(Czech Republic) Jan Hájek	(Czech Republic) Lukáš Rosol (Slovakia) Igor Zelenay	1–6, 6–2, [10–7]

== Performance timeline ==
Key
W	F	SF	QF	#R	RR	Q#	DNQ	A	NH

(W) winner; (F) finalist; (SF) semifinalist; (QF) quarterfinalist; (#R) rounds 4, 3, 2, 1; (RR) round-robin stage; (Q#) qualification round; (DNQ) did not qualify; (A) absent; (NH) not held; (SR) strike rate (events won / competed); (W–L) win–loss record.

=== Singles ===
Tournament	1998	1999	2000	2001	2002	2003	2004	2005	2006	2007	2008	SR	W–L	Win%
Grand Slam tournaments
Australian Open	A	A	1R	Q2	Q1	Q1	Q1	2R	1R	Q2	A	0 / 3	1–3	25%
French Open	A	Q2	1R	Q1	A	Q3	Q1	1R	1R	Q3	Q3	0 / 3	0–3	0%
Wimbledon	A	A	1R	A	Q2	1R	Q1	2R	2R	2R	Q1	0 / 5	3–5	38%
US Open	Q1	1R	A	Q2	Q2	Q2	1R	1R	Q3	Q1	1R	0 / 4	0–4	0%
Win–loss	0–0	0–1	0–3	0–0	0–0	0–1	0–1	2–4	1–3	1–1	0–1	0 / 15	4–15	21%
ATP World Tour Masters 1000
Indian Wells	A	A	A	A	A	A	Q1	2R	1R	1R	A	0 / 3	1–3	25%
Miami	A	A	A	A	A	Q2	Q1	1R	1R	Q1	A	0 / 2	0–2	0%
Monte Carlo	A	A	A	Q1	A	A	A	A	A	A	A	0 / 0	0–0	–
Hamburg	A	A	A	A	A	Q2	A	A	A	A	A	0 / 0	0–0	–
Madrid	Not Held				A	A	A	1R	A	A	A	0 / 1	0–1	0%
Canada	A	A	A	A	A	A	A	Q2	A	Q1	A	0 / 0	0–0	–
Cincinnati	A	A	A	A	A	Q2	A	Q2	A	A	A	0 / 0	0–0	–
Paris	A	A	A	A	A	A	A	Q1	Q1	A	A	0 / 0	0–0	–
Win–loss	0–0	0–0	0–0	0–0	0–0	0–0	0–0	1–3	0–2	0–1	0–0	0 / 6	1–6	14%
