= Juan Carlos Ferrero career statistics =

Career finals
Discipline	Type	Won	Lost	Total
Singles	Grand Slam	1	2	3
Singles	ATP Finals	–	1	1
Singles	ATP 1000*	4	2	6
Singles	Olympics	–	–	–
Singles	ATP 500	2	6	8
Singles	ATP 250	9	7	16
Singles	Total	16	18	34
Doubles	Grand Slam	–	–	–
Doubles	ATP Finals	–	–	–
Doubles	ATP 1000*	–	–	–
Doubles	Olympics	–	–	–
Doubles	ATP 500	–	–	–
Doubles	ATP 250	–	–	–
Doubles	Total	–	–	–
1) WR = Winning Rate; 2) * formerly known as "Super 9" (1996–1999), "Tennis Masters Series" (2000–2003), or "ATP Masters Series" (2004–2008)

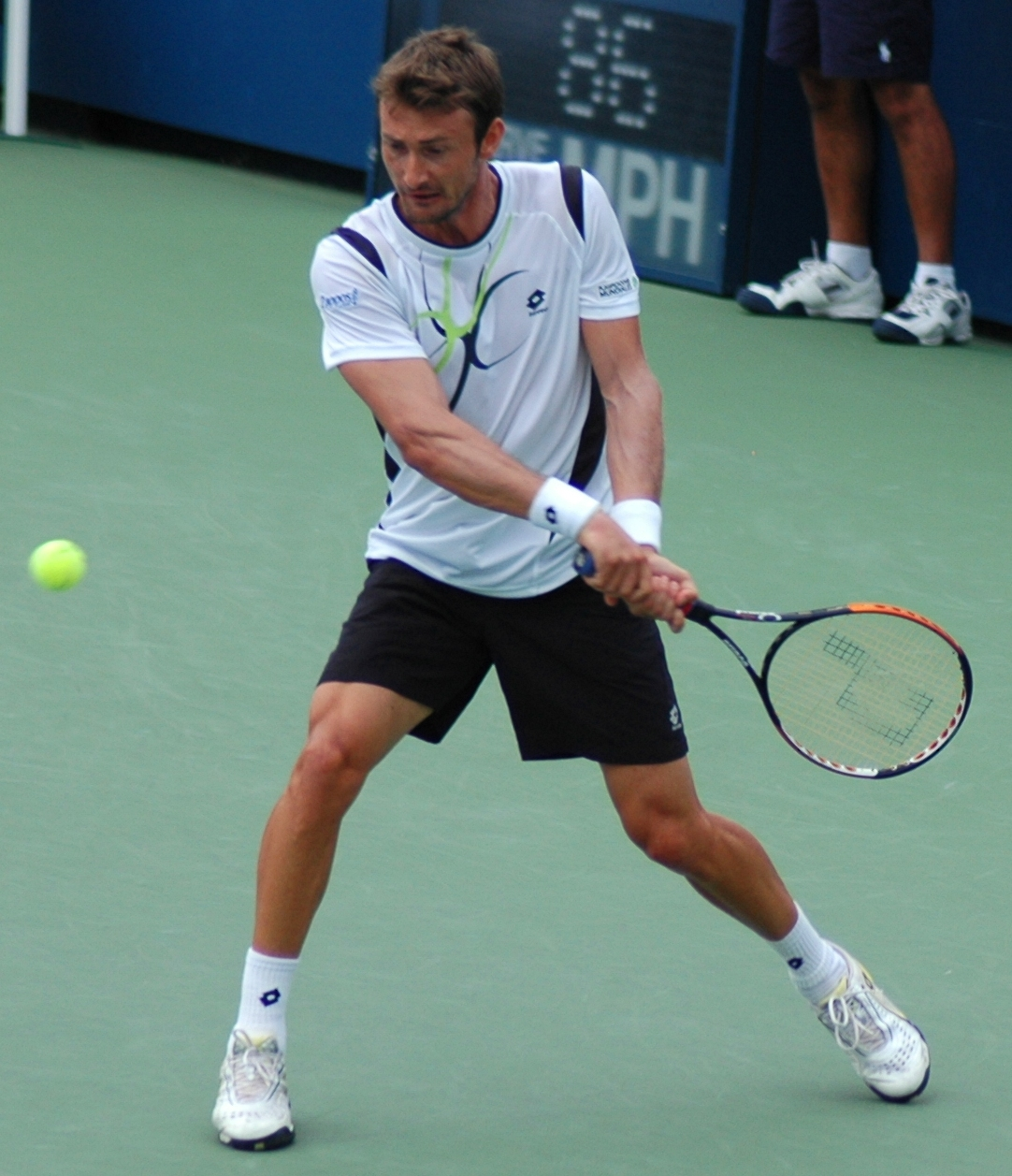
Juan Carlos Ferrero US Open 2009

This is a list of the main career statistics of professional tennis player Juan Carlos Ferrero.

== Major finals ==
=== Grand Slam finals ===
==== Singles: 3 (1 title, 2 runners-up) ====
Result	Year	Championship	Surface	Opponent	Score
Loss	2002	French Open	Clay	(Spain) Albert Costa	1–6, 0–6, 6–4, 3–6
Win	2003	French Open	Clay	(Netherlands) Martin Verkerk	6–1, 6–3, 6–2
Loss	2003	US Open	Hard	(United States) Andy Roddick	3–6, 6–7^{(2–7)}, 3–6

=== Masters Series finals ===
==== Singles: 6 (4 titles, 2 runners-up) ====
Result	Year	Tournament	Surface	Opponent	Score
Win	2001	Rome	Clay	(Brazil) Gustavo Kuerten	3–6, 6–1, 2–6, 6–4, 6–2
Loss	2001	Hamburg	Clay	(Spain) Albert Portas	6–4, 2–6, 6–0, 6–7^{(5–7)}, 5–7
Win	2002	Monte Carlo	Clay	(Spain) Carlos Moyá	7–5, 6–3, 6–4
Win	2003	Monte Carlo (2)	Clay	(Argentina) Guillermo Coria	6–2, 6–2
Win	2003	Madrid	Hard (i)	(Chile) Nicolás Massú	6–3, 6–4, 6–3
Loss	2006	Cincinnati	Hard	(United States) Andy Roddick	3–6, 4–6

=== Masters Cup final ===
==== Singles: 1 (1 runners-up) ====
Result	Year	Tournament	Surface	Opponent	Score
Loss	2002	Shanghai	Hard (i)	(Australia) Lleyton Hewitt	5–7, 5–7, 6–2, 6–2, 4–6

== ATP career finals ==
=== Singles: 34 (16 titles, 18 runner-ups) ===
Legend Grand Slam tournaments (1–2) Tennis Masters Cup / ATP World Tour Finals (0–1) ATP Masters Series / ATP World Tour Masters 1000 (4–2) ATP International Series Gold / ATP World Tour 500 Series (2–6) ATP International Series / ATP World Tour 250 Series (9–7)	Titles by surface Hard (3–9) Clay (13–9) Grass (0–0) Carpet (0–0)	Titles by setting Outdoor (15–14) Indoor (1–4)

Result	W–L	Date	Tournament	Tier	Surface	Opponent	Score	Ref
Win	1–0	Sep 1999	Majorca Open, Spain	World Series	Clay	(Spain) Àlex Corretja	2–6, 7–5, 6–3	
Loss	1–1	Feb 2000	Dubai Tennis Championships, UAE	International	Hard	(Germany) Nicolas Kiefer	5–7, 6–4, 3–6	
Loss	1–2	Apr 2000	Barcelona Open, Spain	Intl. Gold	Clay	(Russia) Marat Safin	3–6, 3–6, 4–6	
Win	2–2	Feb 2001	Dubai Tennis Championships, UAE	Intl. Gold	Hard	(Russia) Marat Safin	6–2, 3–1 ret.	
Win	3–2	Apr 2001	Estoril Open, Portugal	International	Clay	(Spain) Félix Mantilla	7–6^{(7–3)}, 4–6, 6–3	
Win	4–2	Apr 2001	Barcelona Open, Spain	Intl. Gold	Clay	(Spain) Carlos Moyá	4–6, 7–5, 6–3, 3–6, 7–5	
Win	5–2	May 2001	Italian Open, Italy	Masters	Clay	(Brazil) Gustavo Kuerten	3–6, 6–1, 2–6, 6–4, 6–2	
Loss	5–3	May 2001	Hamburg Masters, Germany	Masters	Clay	(Spain) Albert Portas	6–4, 2–6, 6–0, 6–7^{(5–7)}, 5–7	
Loss	5–4	Jul 2001	Swiss Open, Switzerland	International	Clay	(Czech Republic) Jiří Novák	1–6, 7–6^{(7–5)}, 5–7	
Win	6–4	Apr 2002	Monte-Carlo Masters, Monaco	Masters	Clay	(Spain) Carlos Moyá	7–5, 6–3, 6–4	
Loss	6–5	Jun 2002	French Open, France	Grand Slam	Clay	(Spain) Albert Costa	1–6, 0–6, 6–4, 3–6	
Loss	6–6	Jul 2002	Austrian Open Kitzbühel, Austria	Intl. Gold	Clay	(Spain) Àlex Corretja	4–6, 1–6, 3–6	
Win	7–6	Sep 2002	Hong Kong Open, China	International	Hard	(Spain) Carlos Moyà	6–3, 1–6, 7–6^{(7–4)}	
Loss	7–7	Nov 2002	Tennis Masters Cup, China	Tour Finals	Hard (i)	(Australia) Lleyton Hewitt	5–7, 5–7, 6–2, 6–2, 4–6	
Loss	7–8	Jan 2003	Sydney International, Australia	International	Hard	(South Korea) Lee Hyung-taik	6–4, 6–7^{(6–8)}, 6–7^{(4–7)}	
Win	8–8	Apr 2003	Monte-Carlo Masters, Monaco (2)	Masters	Clay	(Argentina) Guillermo Coria	6–2, 6–2	
Win	9–8	Apr 2003	Valencia Open, Spain (2)	International	Clay	(Belgium) Christophe Rochus	6–2, 6–4	
Win	10–8	Jun 2003	French Open, France	Grand Slam	Clay	(Netherlands) Martin Verkerk	6–1, 6–3, 6–2	
Loss	10–9	Sep 2003	US Open, US	Grand Slam	Hard	(United States) Andy Roddick	3–6, 6–7^{(2–7)}, 3–6	
Loss	10–10	Sep 2003	Thailand Open, Thailand	International	Hard (i)	(United States) Taylor Dent	3–6, 6–7^{(5–7)}	
Win	11–10	Oct 2003	Madrid Open, Spain	Masters	Hard (i)	(Chile) Nicolás Massú	6–3, 6–4, 6–3	
Loss	11–11	Feb 2004	Rotterdam Open, Netherlands	Intl. Gold	Hard (i)	(Australia) Lleyton Hewitt	7–6^{(7–1)}, 5–7, 4–6	
Loss	11–12	Apr 2005	Barcelona Open, Spain	Intl. Gold	Clay	(Spain) Rafael Nadal	1–6, 6–7^{(4–7)}, 3–6	
Loss	11–13	Oct 2005	Vienna Open, Austria	Intl. Gold	Hard (i)	(Croatia) Ivan Ljubičić	2–6, 4–6, 6–7^{(5–7)}	
Loss	11–14	Aug 2006	Cincinnati Masters, US	Masters	Hard	(United States) Andy Roddick	4–6, 3–6	
Loss	11–15	Feb 2007	Brasil Open, Brazil	International	Clay	(Argentina) Guillermo Cañas	6–7^{(4–7)}, 2–6	
Loss	11–16	Jan 2008	Auckland Open, New Zealand	International	Hard	(Germany) Philipp Kohlschreiber	6–7^{(4–7)}, 5–7	
Win	12–16	Apr 2009	Grand Prix Hassan II, Morocco	250 Series	Clay	(France) Florent Serra	6–4, 7–5	
Loss	12–17	Aug 2009	Croatia Open, Croatia	250 Series	Clay	(Russia) Nikolay Davydenko	3–6, 0–6	
Win	13–17	Feb 2010	Brasil Open, Brazil	250 Series	Clay	(Poland) Łukasz Kubot	6–1, 6–0	
Win	14–17	Feb 2010	Argentina Open, Argentina	250 Series	Clay	(Spain) David Ferrer	5–7, 6–4, 6–3	
Loss	14–18	Feb 2010	Mexican Open, Mexico	500 Series	Clay	(Spain) David Ferrer	3–6, 6–3, 1–6	
Win	15–18	Aug 2010	Croatia Open, Croatia	250 Series	Clay	(Italy) Potito Starace	6–4, 6–4	
Win	16–18	Jul 2011	Stuttgart Open, Germany	250 Series	Clay	(Spain) Pablo Andújar	6–4, 6–0	

== ATP Challengers & ITF Futures Singles finals ==
Legend
ATP Challenger Tour (3-1)
ITF Futures (2-1)

Result	No.	Date	Championship	Surface	Opponent	Score
Loss	1.	April 26, 1998	Rome, Italy	Clay	(Argentina) Miguel Pastura	4–6, 5–7
Win	2.	August 2, 1998	Gandia, Spain	Clay	(Spain) Gorka Fraile	6–2, 6–0
Win	3.	September 13, 1998	Santander, Spain	Clay	(Spain) Emilio Viuda Hernández	6–1, 6–1
Win	1.	April 11, 1999	Napoli, Italy	Clay	(Spain) Juan Albert Viloca	3–6, 7–6^{(7–4)}, 6–1
Loss	2.	June 6, 1999	Prostějov, Czech Republic	Clay	(Australia) Richard Fromberg	6–7^{(5–7)}, 7-5, 4-6
Win	3.	June 13, 1999	Maia, Portugal	Clay	(Argentina) Mariano Hood	6–3, 5–7, 6–3
Loss	4.	February 1, 1999	Graz, Austria	Clay	(Czech Republic) Tomáš Zíb	6–7^{(7–9)}, 1–6

== Performance timelines ==
Key
W	F	SF	QF	#R	RR	Q#	DNQ	A	NH

(W) winner; (F) finalist; (SF) semifinalist; (QF) quarterfinalist; (#R) rounds 4, 3, 2, 1; (RR) round-robin stage; (Q#) qualification round; (DNQ) did not qualify; (A) absent; (NH) not held; (SR) strike rate (events won / competed); (W–L) win–loss record.

=== Singles ===
Tournament	1999	2000	2001	2002	2003	2004	2005	2006	2007	2008	2009	2010	2011	2012	SR	W–L
Grand Slam tournaments
Australian Open	A	3R	2R	A	QF	SF	3R	3R	2R	4R	1R	1R	A	1R	0 / 11	20–11
French Open	Q1	SF	SF	F	W	2R	3R	3R	3R	1R	2R	3R	A	2R	1 / 12	34–11
Wimbledon	A	A	3R	2R	4R	3R	4R	3R	QF	2R	QF	1R	A	1R	0 / 11	22–11
US Open	1R	4R	3R	3R	F	2R	1R	2R	1R	A	4R	3R	4R	A	0 / 12	23–12
Win–loss	0–1	10–3	10–4	9–3	20–3	9–4	7–4	7–4	7–4	4–3	8–4	4–4	3–1	1–3	1 / 46	99–45
ATP World Tour Finals
Tour Finals	A	A	SF	F	RR	A	A	A	A	A	A	A	A	A	0 / 3	5–7
Olympic Games
Summer Olympics	NH	QF	not held			2R	not held			A	not held			A	0 / 2	4–2
Davis Cup Singles
World Group	A	W	1R	QF	F	W	1R	A	A	A	W	A	A	F	3 / 8	18–6
ATP World Tour Masters 1000
Indian Wells	A	1R	1R	1R	2R	A	2R	3R	4R	4R	A	3R	A	A	0 / 9	8–9
Miami	A	2R	4R	3R	3R	A	4R	2R	2R	3R	A	4R	A	A	0 / 9	10–9
Monte Carlo	A	QF	2R	W	W	1R	SF	3R	SF	3R	A	QF	A	A	2 / 10	31–8
Rome	Q1	3R	W	2R	SF	A	A	1R	2R	3R	Q2	1R	A	3R	1 / 9	18–8
Hamburg (Note: Held as Hamburg Masters until 2008, Madrid (clay) 2009-present.)	A	2R	F	1R	A	A	3R	3R	3R	A	2R	A	1R	1R	0 / 9	13–9
Canada	A	3R	QF	2R	3R	1R	3R	2R	1R	A	3R	A	1R	A	0 / 10	13–10
Cincinnati	A	1R	2R	SF	2R	2R	2R	F	3R	A	1R	A	1R	A	0 / 10	15–10
Madrid (Note: Held as Stuttgart Masters from 1995-01, held as Madrid Masters (hardcourt) from 2002–08, and Shanghai Masters 2009-present.)	A	2R	2R	QF	W	2R	1R	2R	3R	A	1R	A	3R	A	1 / 10	11–9
Paris	2R	SF	3R	2R	3R	A	3R	A	1R	A	A	A	1R	A	0 / 8	7–8
Win–loss	1–1	11–9	19–8	15–8	21–6	1–4	14–8	11–8	13–9	7–4	3–4	6–4	2–5	2–2	4 / 84	126–80
Career statistics
Tournaments played	9	26	23	25	20	16	26	23	23	15	21	17	12	10	266	
Titles–Runners-up	1–0	0–2	4–2	2–3	4–3	0–1	0–2	0–1	0–1	0–1	1–1	3–1	1–0	0–0	16 / 266	16–18
Hardcourt win–loss	0–2	20–16	18–12	22–13	30–12	14–10	18–13	10–11	10–10	14–9	9–11	5–5	9–7	0–3	3 / 133	178–134
Clay win–loss	15–5	23–7	34–5	21–8	33–5	6–4	21–10	14–10	20–11	4–4	18–7	28–7	11–4	5–8	13 / 105	254–95
Grass win–loss	0–0	0–1	2–1	1–1	3–3	2–1	5–2	4–2	4–2	1–1	8–2	0–2	0–0	0–1	0 / 17	30–19
Carpet win–loss	1–1	3–2	3–3	4–3	1–1	1–1	2–2	0–0	0–0	2–1	0–0	0–0	0–0	0–0	0 / 13	17–14
Overall win–loss	16–8	46–26	57–21	48–25	67–21	23–16	46–27	28–23	34–23	21–15	35–20	33–14	20–11	5–12	16 / 266	479–262
Win %	67%	64%	73%	66%	76%	59%	63%	55%	60%	58%	66%	70%	66%	29%	65%	
Year End Ranking	42	12	5	4	3	31	17	23	24	55	23	29	50	213	$13,998,165	

=== Doubles ===
Tournament	2002	2003	2004	2005	2006	W–L
Australian Open	A	A	1R	1R	A	0–2
French Open	A	A	A	A	A	0–0
Wimbledon	1R	1R	A	A	A	0–2
US Open	A	A	A	A	1R	0–1

== ITF Futures Doubles finals ==
Legend
ITF Futures (0-2)

Result.	No.	Date	Tournament	Surface	Partner	Opponents	Score
Loss	1.	July 26, 1998	Elche, Spain	Clay	(Spain) Feliciano López	(Spain) Sergi Durán (Spain) Javier Pérez Vázquez	6-7, 3-6
Loss	2.	September 13, 1998	Santander, Spain	Clay	(Spain) Feliciano López	(Sweden) Daniel Påhlsson (Sweden) Robert Samuelsson	3-6, 6-3, 2-6

== Head-to-head against other players ==
Ferrero's win-loss record against certain players who have been Association of Tennis Professionals ranked world No. 10 or better is as follows:

No.	Player	Win	Loss
Number 1 ranked players
1	(Spain) Carlos Moyà	8	6
2	(Switzerland) Roger Federer	3	10
3	(Australia) Patrick Rafter	2	1
4	(Australia) Lleyton Hewitt	4	6
5	(Russia) Yevgeny Kafelnikov	1	2
6	(Russia) Marat Safin	6	6
7	(Chile) Marcelo Ríos	3	1
8	(Brazil) Gustavo Kuerten	3	2
9	(United States) Andre Agassi	3	2
10	(United States) Andy Roddick	0	5
11	(Serbia) Novak Djokovic	1	2
12	(Spain) Rafael Nadal	2	7
13	(United Kingdom) Andy Murray	0	3
Number 2 ranked players
1	(Germany) Tommy Haas	3	2
2	(Spain) Àlex Corretja	4	2
3	(United States) Michael Chang	0	1
4	(Socialist Federal Republic of Yugoslavia) Goran Ivanišević	1	0
Number 3 ranked players
1	(Croatia) Ivan Ljubičić	3	3
2	(Spain) Sergi Bruguera	2	0
3	(Argentina) David Nalbandian	3	4
4	(Argentina) Guillermo Coria	3	3
5	(Russia) Nikolay Davydenko	2	3
6	(Spain) David Ferrer	2	7
7	(Switzerland) Stanislas Wawrinka	3	3
8	(Croatia) Marin Čilić	0	2
Number 4 ranked players
1	(United Kingdom) Greg Rusedski	0	3
2	(United Kingdom) Tim Henman	2	1
3	(Germany) Nicolas Kiefer	3	2
4	(Netherlands) Richard Krajicek	0	3
5	(Sweden) Jonas Björkman	3	0
6	(Sweden) Thomas Enqvist	2	1
7	(France) Sébastien Grosjean	3	1
8	(United States) Todd Martin	2	0
9	(United States) James Blake	3	1
10	(Argentina) Juan Martín del Potro	2	1
11	(Czech Republic) Tomáš Berdych	0	2
Number 5 ranked players
1	(Argentina) Gastón Gaudio	8	5
2	(Spain) Tommy Robredo	3	2
3	(Czech Republic) Jiří Novák	4	2
4	(France) Cédric Pioline	2	1
5	(Germany) Rainer Schüttler	5	2
6	(Chile) Fernando González	4	3
7	(France) Jo-Wilfried Tsonga	1	3
Number 6 ranked players
1	(Spain) Albert Costa	4	3
2	(South Africa) Wayne Ferreira	2	1
3	(Ecuador) Nicolás Lapentti	7	2
4	(Slovakia) Karol Kučera	0	1
5	(France) Gilles Simon	2	0
6	(France) Gaël Monfils	3	0

No.	Player	Win	Loss
Number 7 ranked players
1	(Sweden) Thomas Johansson	2	0
2	(Croatia) Mario Ančić	4	0
3	(Spain) Fernando Verdasco	3	3
4	(United States) Mardy Fish	0	1
5	(France) Richard Gasquet	1	0
Number 8 ranked players
1	(Czech Republic) Radek Štěpánek	1	3
2	(Australia) Mark Philippoussis	2	1
3	(Russia) Mikhail Youzhny	4	1
4	(Austria) Jürgen Melzer	4	3
5	(Argentina) Guillermo Cañas	2	2
6	(Cyprus) Marcos Baghdatis	1	2
7	(Serbia and Montenegro) / (Serbia) Janko Tipsarević	2	1
Number 9 ranked players
1	(Chile) Nicolás Massú	6	2
2	(Argentina) Mariano Puerta	1	1
3	(Thailand) Paradorn Srichaphan	2	2
4	(Sweden) Joachim Johansson	1	1
5	(Spain) Nicolás Almagro	2	4
6	(Switzerland) Marc Rosset	1	0
Number 10 ranked players
1	(Sweden) Magnus Gustafsson	1	2
2	(Spain) Félix Mantilla	7	0
3	(Sweden) Magnus Larsson	0	1
4	(France) Arnaud Clément	1	2
5	(Argentina) Juan Mónaco	2	2

== ATP Tour career earnings ==
Year	Majors	ATP wins	Total wins	Earnings ($)	Money list rank
1999	0	1	1	204,626	104
2000	0	0	0	812,636	17
2001	0	4	4	1,864,671	6
2002	0	2	2	2,761,498	2
2003	1	3	4	3,026,760	3
2004	0	0	0	515,875	41
2005	0	0	0	727,673	26
2006	0	0	0	579,740	30
2007	0	0	0	685,385	28
2008	0	0	0	394,151	81
2009	0	1	1	$689,963	32
2010	0	3	3	731,394	31
2011	0	1	1	478,626	64
2012	0	0	0	193,976	140
Career	1	15	16	$13,998,165	57

== Top-10 wins per season ==
Season	1998	1999	2000	2001	2002	2003	2004	2005	2006	2007	2008	2009	2010	2011	2012
Wins	0	0	4	6	8	4	0	6	3	3	2	3	1	1	0

=== Wins over top-10 players per season ===
#	Player	Rank	Event	Surface	Rd	Score
2000
1.	(Ecuador) Nicolás Lapentti	9	Dubai, United Arab Emirates	Hard	2R	6–4, 6–3
2.	(Russia) Yevgeny Kafelnikov	3	Davis Cup Quarterfinal	Clay	RR	6–2, 6–2, 6–2
3.	(Spain) Àlex Corretja	10	French Open, Paris, France	Clay	QF	6–4, 6–4, 6–2
4.	(Australia) Lleyton Hewitt	7	Davis Cup Final	Clay	RR	6–2, 7–6^{(7–5)}, 4–6, 6–4
2001
5.	(Sweden) Magnus Norman	5	Dubai, United Arab Emirates	Hard	QF	6–2, 4–6, 6–4
6.	(Russia) Marat Safin	2	Dubai, United Arab Emirates	Hard	F	6–3, 3–1 ret.
7.	(Brazil) Gustavo Kuerten	1	Rome, Italy	Clay	F	3–6, 6–1, 2–6, 6–4, 6–2
8.	(Australia) Lleyton Hewitt	6	French Open, Paris, France	Clay	QF	6–4, 6–2, 6–1
9.	(France) Sébastien Grosjean	8	Gstaad, Switzerland	Clay	SF	6–4, 6–4
10.	(Brazil) Gustavo Kuerten	1	Tennis Masters Cup, Sydney, Australia	Hard (i)	RR	7–6^{(7–3)}, 6–2
2002
11.	(Germany) Tommy Haas	7	Monte Carlo, Monaco	Clay	QF	6–3, 6–1
12.	(France) Sebastien Grosjean	8	Monte Carlo, Monaco	Clay	SF	6–3, 1–6, 6–0
13.	(United States) Andre Agassi	4	French Open, Paris, France	Clay	QF	6–3, 3–6, 7–5, 6–3
14.	(Russia) Marat Safin	2	French Open, Paris, France	Clay	SF	6–3, 6–2, 6–4
15.	(Spain) Carlos Moyà	10	Hong Kong, China	Hard	F	6–3, 1–6, 7–6^{(7–4)}
16.	(United States) Andre Agassi	2	Tennis Masters Cup, Shanghai, China	Hard (i)	RR	7–5, 2–6, 7–6^{(8–6)}
17.	(Czech Republic) Jiří Novák	7	Tennis Masters Cup, Shanghai, China	Hard (i)	RR	7–5, 6–3
18.	(Spain) Carlos Moyà	5	Tennis Masters Cup, Shanghai, China	Hard (i)	SF	6–7^{(6–8)}, 6–4, 6–4
2003
19.	(Spain) Albert Costa	9	French Open, Paris, France	Clay	SF	6–3, 7–6^{(7–5)}, 6–4
20.	(Australia) Lleyton Hewitt	6	US Open, New York City, USA	Hard	QF	4–6, 6–3, 7–6^{(7–5)}, 6–1
21.	(United States) Andre Agassi	1	US Open, New York City, USA	Hard	SF	6–4, 6–3, 3–6, 6–4
22.	(Switzerland) Roger Federer	3	Madrid, Spain	Hard (i)	SF	6–4, 4–6, 6–4
2005
23.	(Russia) Marat Safin	4	Monte Carlo, Monaco	Clay	3R	6–2, 6–3
24.	(Argentina) Gastón Gaudio	8	Barcelona, Spain	Clay	QF	6–4, 4–6, 6–3
25.	(Russia) Marat Safin	4	Hamburg, Germany	Clay	2R	4–6, 6–4, 6–2
26.	(Argentina) Guillermo Coria	9	Montreal, Canada	Hard	1R	6–3, 6–2
27.	(Argentina) David Nalbandian	9	Beijing, China	Hard	QF	6–2, 3–6, 6–3
28.	(Argentina) David Nalbandian	9	Vienna, Austria	Hard (i)	QF	7–6^{(7–5)}, 6–3
2006
29.	(United States) James Blake	5	Cincinnati, USA	Hard	2R	6–2, 6–4
30.	(Spain) Rafael Nadal	2	Cincinnati, USA	Hard	QF	7–6^{(7–2)}, 7–6^{(7–3)}
31.	(Spain) Tommy Robredo	7	Cincinnati, USA	Hard	SF	6–3, 6–4
2007
32.	(United States) James Blake	9	Wimbledon, London, UK	Grass	3R	3–6, 6–3, 6–3, 7–6^{(7–4)}
33.	(Chile) Fernando González	6	Cincinnati, USA	Hard	2R	6–2, 7–6^{(9–7)}
34.	(Chile) Fernando González	6	Vienna, Austria	Hard (i)	QF	6–3, 4–6, 6–4
2008
35.	(Argentina) David Nalbandian	10	Australian Open, Melbourne, Australia	Hard	2R	6–1, 6–2, 6–3
36.	(Spain) Rafael Nadal	2	Rome, Italy	Clay	2R	7–5, 6–1
2009
37.	(Chile) Fernando González	10	Wimbledon, London, UK	Grass	3R	4–6, 7–5, 6–4, 4–6, 6–4
38.	(France) Gilles Simon	7	Wimbledon, London, UK	Grass	4R	7–6^{(7–4)}, 6–3, 6–2
39.	(France) Gilles Simon	9	US Open, New York City, USA	Hard	3R	1–6, 6–4, 7–6^{(7–5)}, 1–0 ret
2010
40.	(France) Jo-Wilfried Tsonga	10	Monte Carlo, Monaco	Clay	3R	6–1, 3–6, 7–5
2011
41.	(France) Gaël Monfils	7	US Open, New York City, USA	Hard	2R	7–6^{(7–5)}, 5–7, 6–7^{(5–7)}, 6–4, 6–4
