= 2002 Generali Open =

- Date: 22–28 July
- Edition: 47th
- Category: International Series Gold
- Draw: 48S / 24D
- Prize money: $855,000
- Surface: Clay / outdoor
- Location: Kitzbühel, Austria
- Venue: Tennis Stadium Kitzbühel

Champions

Singles
- (Spain) Àlex Corretja

Doubles
- (South Africa) Robbie Koenig / (Japan) Thomas Shimada
← 2001 ·	Generali Open	· 2003 →

The 2002 Generali Open was a men's tennis tournament played on outdoor clay courts at the Tennis Stadium Kitzbühel in Kitzbühel in Austria and was part of the International Series Gold of the 2002 ATP Tour. It was the 47th edition of the tournament and ran from 22 July until 28 July 2002. Àlex Corretja won the singles title.

== Finals ==
=== Singles ===
(Spain) Àlex Corretja defeated (Spain) Juan Carlos Ferrero 6–4, 6–1, 6–3

- It was Corretja's 2nd title of the year and the 20th of his career.

=== Doubles ===
(South Africa) Robbie Koenig / (Japan) Thomas Shimada defeated (Argentina) Lucas Arnold / (Spain) Àlex Corretja 7–6^{(7–3)}, 6–4

- It was Koenig's 1st title of the year and the 1st of his career. It was Shimada's only title of the year and the 2nd of his career.
