= 2003 Generali Open – Doubles =

Doubles
- 2003 Generali Open

Final
- Champions: (Czech Republic) Martin Damm (Czech Republic) Cyril Suk
- Runners-up: (Austria) Jürgen Melzer (Austria) Alexander Peya
- Score: 6–4, 6–4

Details
- Draw: 16
- Seeds: 4

Events
Singles	Doubles
- Generali Open

Robbie Koenig and Thomas Shimada were the defending champions but only Koenig competed that year with Petr Pála.

Koenig and Pála lost in the semifinals to Martin Damm and Cyril Suk.

Damm and Suk won in the final 6–4, 6–4 against Jürgen Melzer and Alexander Peya.

== Seeds ==
Champion seeds are indicated in bold text while text in italics indicates the round in which those seeds were eliminated.

1. (Australia) Wayne Arthurs / (Australia) Paul Hanley (quarterfinals)
2. (Czech Republic) **Martin Damm** / (Czech Republic) **Cyril Suk (champions)**
3. (Zimbabwe) Wayne Black / (Zimbabwe) Kevin Ullyett (quarterfinals)
4. (Czech Republic) František Čermák / (Czech Republic) Leoš Friedl (first round)

== Draw ==
Key

- Q = Qualifier
- WC = Wild card
- LL = Lucky loser
- Alt = Alternate
- ITF = ITF entry
- PR = Protected ranking
- SR = Special ranking
- SE = Special exempt
- JE = Junior exempt
- JR = Junior Accelerator Programme entrant
- CO = College Accelerator Programme entrant
- NG = Next Gen Accelerator Program entrant
- w/o = Walkover
- r = Retired
- d = Defaulted

First round
1	(Australia) **W Arthurs** (Australia) **P Hanley**	**6**	**6**
(Germany) M Kohlmann (Russia) M Youzhny	4	3
(United States) D Bowen (Australia) A Fisher	3	4
WC	(Austria) **J Melzer** (Austria) **A Peya**	**6**	**6**
3	(Zimbabwe) **W Black** (Zimbabwe) **K Ullyett**	**7**	**6**
(Argentina) J I Chela (Argentina) G Gaudio	5	0
(Argentina) L Arnold (Argentina) M Hood	4	3
(Argentina) **G Etlis** (Argentina) **M Rodríguez**	**6**	**6**
(Czech Republic) T Cibulec (Czech Republic) P Vízner	0^{r}
(South Africa) **R Koenig** (Czech Republic) **P Pála**	3
(South Africa) **C Haggard** (South Africa) **M Wakefield**	4	**6**	**6**
4	(Czech Republic) F Čermák (Czech Republic) L Friedl	**6**	4	3
(Germany) K Braasch (Germany) R Schüttler	3	6^{6}
(Ecuador) **N Lapentti** (Spain) **F López**	**6**	**7^{8}**
WC	(Romania) V Hănescu (Romania) F Mergea	2	**6**	4
2	(Czech Republic) **M Damm** (Czech Republic) **C Suk**	**6**	4	**6**

Quarterfinals
1	(Australia) W Arthurs (Australia) P Hanley	6^{4}	6^{4}
WC	(Austria) **J Melzer** (Austria) **A Peya**	**7^{7}**	**7^{7}**
3	(Zimbabwe) W Black (Zimbabwe) K Ullyett	4	**6**	1
(Argentina) **G Etlis** (Argentina) **M Rodríguez**	**6**	3	**6**
(South Africa) **R Koenig** (Czech Republic) **P Pála**	3	**6**	**6**
(South Africa) C Haggard (South Africa) M Wakefield	**6**	3	4
(Ecuador) N Lapentti (Spain) F López
2	(Czech Republic) **M Damm** (Czech Republic) **C Suk**	w/o

Semifinals
WC	(Austria) **J Melzer** (Austria) **A Peya**	**7^{7}**	**6**
(Argentina) G Etlis (Argentina) M Rodríguez	6^{5}	4
(South Africa) R Koenig (Czech Republic) P Pála	**6**	3	6^{4}
2	(Czech Republic) **M Damm** (Czech Republic) **C Suk**	3	**6**	**7^{7}**

Final
WC	(Austria) Jürgen Melzer (Austria) Alexander Peya	4	4
2	(Czech Republic) **Martin Damm** (Czech Republic) **Cyril Suk**	**6**	**6**
