= 2001 Heineken Open Shanghai – Singles =

Singles
- 2001 Heineken Open Shanghai
- 2000 Champion: (Sweden) Magnus Norman

Final
- Champion: (Germany) Rainer Schüttler
- Runner-up: (Switzerland) Michel Kratochvil
- Score: 6–3, 6–4

Events
| Singles | Doubles |
- Heineken Open Shanghai

Magnus Norman was the defending champion but did not compete that year.

Rainer Schüttler won in the final 6–3, 6–4 against Michel Kratochvil.

Francisco Clavet set an ATP tournament record for the shortest match in the first round when he defeated Shan Jiang in 25 minutes, 6–0, 6-0.

== Seeds ==
A champion seed is indicated in bold text while text in italics indicates the round in which that seed was eliminated.

1. (United States) Andre Agassi (first round)
2. (Germany) **Rainer Schüttler (champion)**
3. (Switzerland) Michel Kratochvil (final)
4. (Spain) Francisco Clavet (semifinals)
5. (Spain) Álex Calatrava (first round)
6. (Russia) Andrei Stoliarov (first round)
7. (Germany) Lars Burgsmüller (first round)
8. (Australia) Andrew Ilie (first round)

== Draw ==
Key

- Q = Qualifier
- WC = Wild card
- LL = Lucky loser
- Alt = Alternate
- ITF = ITF entry
- PR = Protected ranking
- SR = Special ranking
- SE = Special exempt
- JE = Junior exempt
- JR = Junior Accelerator Programme entrant
- CO = College Accelerator Programme entrant
- NG = Next Gen Accelerator Program entrant
- w/o = Walkover
- r = Retired
- d = Defaulted

First round
WC/1 | (United States) A Agassi | 6^{4} | 5
(Georgia (country)) **I Labadze** | **7^{7}** | **7**
(United States) **J Gimelstob** | **7^{8}** | 3 | **6**
(Thailand) P Srichaphan | 6^{6} | **6** | 4
Q | (South Africa) R Koenig | 3 | **6** | 2
(Brazil) **A Sá** | **6** | 2 | **6**
(Denmark) **K Carlsen** | **6** | **7^{7}**
5 | (Spain) Á Calatrava | 4 | 6^{1}
3 | (Switzerland) **M Kratochvil** | **6** | **6**
WC | (China) Y Wang | 2 | 1
Q | (Czech Republic) P Luxa | 1 | 5
(Switzerland) **G Bastl** | **6** | **7**
(Japan) M Onoda | 3 | 1
(Netherlands) **E Kempes** | **6** | **6**
(Zimbabwe) **B Black** | **7^{8}** | **6**
7 | (Germany) L Burgsmüller | 6^{6} | 3
6 | (Russia) A Stoliarov | 3 | 4
Q | (Australia) **M Tebbutt** | **6** | **6**
(United States) C Mamiit | **6** | 3 | 4
(Japan) **T Terachi** | 3 | **6** | **6**
(South Korea) **H-T Lee** | **6** | **6**
(Japan) Y Ishii | 1 | 3
WC | (China) S Jiang | 0 | 0
4 | (Spain) **F Clavet** | **6** | **6**
8 | (Australia) A Ilie | 5 | 4
(Israel) **N Behr** | **7** | **6**
Q | (Japan) T Shimada | 4 | 4
(South Korea) **Y-I Yoon** | **6** | **6**
(South Africa) N Godwin | 4 | 6^{4}
(Switzerland) **I Heuberger** | **6** | **7^{7}**
(United States) M Russell | 5 | 4
2 | (Germany) **R Schüttler** | **7** | **6**

Second round
(Georgia (country)) **I Labadze** | 6^{2} | **7^{7}** | **6**
(United States) J Gimelstob | **7^{7}** | 6^{3} | 2
(Brazil) A Sá | 4 | 3
(Denmark) **K Carlsen** | **6** | **6**
3 | (Switzerland) **M Kratochvil** | 4 | **6** | **6**
(Switzerland) G Bastl | **6** | 2 | 2
(Netherlands) **E Kempes** | **7^{7}** | 6^{1} | **6**
(Zimbabwe) B Black | 6^{3} | **7^{7}** | 3
Q | (Australia) M Tebbutt | **7^{7}** | 4 | 1
(Japan) **T Terachi** | 6^{5} | **6** | **6**
(South Korea) H-T Lee | 4 | 2
4 | (Spain) **F Clavet** | **6** | **6**
(Israel) **N Behr** | **7^{7}** | 6^{6} | **6**
(South Korea) Y-I Yoon | 6^{3} | **7^{8}** | 2
(Switzerland) I Heuberger | 3 | 4
2 | (Germany) **R Schüttler** | **6** | **6**

Quarterfinals
(Georgia (country)) I Labadze | **6** | 3 | 3
(Denmark) **K Carlsen** | 3 | **6** | **6**
3 | (Switzerland) **M Kratochvil** | 6^{4} | **7^{7}** | **6**
(Netherlands) E Kempes | **7^{7}** | 6^{1} | 1
(Japan) T Terachi | **6** | 1 | 1
4 | (Spain) **F Clavet** | 3 | **6** | **6**
(Israel) N Behr | 5 | 2
2 | (Germany) **R Schüttler** | **7** | **6**

Semifinals
(Denmark) K Carlsen | 2 | 4
3 | (Switzerland) **M Kratochvil** | **6** | **6**
4 | (Spain) F Clavet | 4 | **6** | 3
2 | (Germany) **R Schüttler** | **6** | 1 | **6**

Final
3 | (Switzerland) Michel Kratochvil | 3 | 4
2 | (Germany) **Rainer Schüttler** | **6** | **6**
