= 2002 Monte Carlo Masters – Doubles =

Doubles
- 2002 Monte Carlo Masters

Final
- Champions: (Sweden) Jonas Björkman (Australia) Todd Woodbridge
- Runners-up: (Netherlands) Paul Haarhuis (Russia) Yevgeny Kafelnikov
- Score: 6–3, 3–6, [10–7]

Events
Singles	Doubles
← 2001 ·	Monte Carlo Masters	· 2003 →

Jonas Björkman and Todd Woodbridge were the defending champions and won in the final 6–3, 3–6, [10–7] against Paul Haarhuis and Yevgeny Kafelnikov.

== Seeds ==
1. (United States) Donald Johnson / (United States) Jared Palmer (semifinals)
2. (The Bahamas) Mark Knowles / (Canada) Daniel Nestor (quarterfinals)
3. (Czech Republic) Jiří Novák / (Czech Republic) David Rikl (second round)
4. (India) Mahesh Bhupathi / (United States) Jeff Tarango (first round)
5. (Sweden) Jonas Björkman / (Australia) Todd Woodbridge (champions)
6. (South Africa) Ellis Ferreira / (United States) Rick Leach (first round)
7. (Australia) Joshua Eagle / (Australia) Sandon Stolle (first round)
8. (United States) Bob Bryan / (United States) Mike Bryan (first round)

== Draw ==
=== Key ===
- Q = Qualifier
- WC = Wild card
- LL = Lucky loser
- Alt = Alternate
- SE = Special exempt
- PR = Protected ranking
- ITF = ITF entry
- JE = Junior exempt
- w/o = Walkover
- r = Retired
- d = Defaulted
- SR = Special ranking

=== Finals ===
Semifinals
1	(United States) Donald Johnson (United States) Jared Palmer	2	4
(Netherlands) Paul Haarhuis (Russia) Yevgeny Kafelnikov	6	6
(France) Arnaud Clément (France) Nicolas Escudé	6	1	[10]
5	(Sweden) Jonas Björkman (Australia) Todd Woodbridge	4	6	[12]

Final
(Netherlands) Paul Haarhuis (Russia) Yevgeny Kafelnikov	3	6	[7]
5	(Sweden) Jonas Björkman (Australia) Todd Woodbridge	6	3	[10]

=== Top half ===
First round
1	(United States) D Johnson (United States) J Palmer	6	6
(South Africa) J-L de Jager (India) L Paes	2	0
(United States) B MacPhie (Federal Republic of Yugoslavia) N Zimonjić	4	6	[10]
(South Africa) C Haggard (Belgium) T Vanhoudt	6	4	[2]
(Argentina) L Arnold (Argentina) G Etlis	6	6
(Ecuador) N Lapentti (Chile) M Ríos	1	2
(Czech Republic) M Damm (Czech Republic) C Suk	7	3	[10]
8	(United States) B Bryan (United States) M Bryan	5	6	[7]
3	(Czech Republic) J Novák (Czech Republic) D Rikl	4	6	[10]
(Morocco) H Arazi (Morocco) Y El Aynaoui	6	4	[3]
WC	(France) A Dupuis (France) P-H Mathieu	4	6^{3}
(Netherlands) P Haarhuis (Russia) Y Kafelnikov	6	7^{7}
(Argentina) G Cañas (Russia) M Safin	6	4	[10]
(Czech Republic) L Friedl (Czech Republic) R Štěpánek	4	6	[5]
(South Africa) R Koenig (Japan) T Shimada	6^{5}	6	[10]
6	(South Africa) E Ferreira (United States) R Leach	7^{7}	3	[8]

Second round
1	(United States) D Johnson (United States) J Palmer	6	6
(United States) B MacPhie (Federal Republic of Yugoslavia) N Zimonjić	2	4
(Argentina) L Arnold (Argentina) G Etlis	6^{3}	5
(Czech Republic) M Damm (Czech Republic) C Suk	7^{7}	7
3	(Czech Republic) J Novák (Czech Republic) D Rikl	3	6	[5]
(Netherlands) P Haarhuis (Russia) Y Kafelnikov	6	2	[10]
(Argentina) G Cañas (Russia) M Safin	6	7
(South Africa) R Koenig (Japan) T Shimada	4	5

Quarterfinals
1	(United States) D Johnson (United States) J Palmer	6	3	[10]
(Czech Republic) M Damm (Czech Republic) C Suk	1	6	[7]
(Netherlands) P Haarhuis (Russia) Y Kafelnikov	7^{11}	6
(Argentina) G Cañas (Russia) M Safin	6^{9}	2

Semifinals
1	(United States) D Johnson (United States) J Palmer	2	4
(Netherlands) P Haarhuis (Russia) Y Kafelnikov	6	6

=== Bottom half ===
First round
7	(Australia) J Eagle (Australia) S Stolle	2	5
(Spain) J C Ferrero (Spain) T Robredo	6	7
(Switzerland) R Federer (Belarus) M Mirnyi	2	6	[9]
(Czech Republic) T Cibulec (Czech Republic) P Vízner	6	0	[11]
(Australia) A Florent (Australia) D Macpherson	6	6
(Sweden) T Enqvist (Sweden) T Johansson	3	1
(France) A Clément (France) N Escudé	6	7^{7}
4	(India) M Bhupathi (United States) J Tarango	1	6^{4}
5	(Sweden) J Björkman (Australia) T Woodbridge	7	6
(Germany) D Prinosil (Netherlands) S Schalken	5	3
WC	(France) M Llodra (France) C Pioline	6	6
(Australia) M Hill (Argentina) D Orsanic	2	4
(United Kingdom) T Henman (France) F Santoro	6	6
WC	(United States) J-M Gambill (Germany) N Kiefer	1	2
(Sweden) S Aspelin (Australia) A Kratzmann	6	4^{r}
2	(The Bahamas) M Knowles (Canada) D Nestor	4	2

Second round
(Spain) J C Ferrero (Spain) T Robredo	3	6	[10]
(Czech Republic) T Cibulec (Czech Republic) P Vízner	6	0	[5]
(Australia) A Florent (Australia) D Macpherson	4	3
(France) A Clément (France) N Escudé	6	6
5	(Sweden) J Björkman (Australia) T Woodbridge	6	4	[10]
WC	(France) M Llodra (France) C Pioline	4	6	[8]
(United Kingdom) T Henman (France) F Santoro	5	6^{4}
2	(The Bahamas) M Knowles (Canada) D Nestor	7	7^{7}

Quarterfinals
(Spain) J C Ferrero (Spain) T Robredo	6^{1}	4
(France) A Clément (France) N Escudé	7^{7}	6
5	(Sweden) J Björkman (Australia) T Woodbridge	6	3	[10]
2	(The Bahamas) M Knowles (Canada) D Nestor	3	6	[6]

Semifinals
(France) A Clément (France) N Escudé	6	1	[10]
5	(Sweden) J Björkman (Australia) T Woodbridge	4	6	[12]
