= 2002 President's Cup – Doubles =

Doubles
- 2002 President's Cup
- 2001 Champions: (France) Julien Boutter (Slovakia) Dominik Hrbatý

Final
- Champions: (South Africa) David Adams (South Africa) Robbie Koenig
- Runners-up: (Netherlands) Raemon Sluiter (Netherlands) Martin Verkerk
- Score: 6–2, 7–5

Events
Singles	Doubles
← 2001 ·	President's Cup

Julien Boutter and Dominik Hrbatý were the defending champions but did not compete that year.

David Adams and Robbie Koenig won in the final 6–2, 7–5 against Raemon Sluiter and Martin Verkerk.

== Seeds ==
Champion seeds are indicated in bold text while text in italics indicates the round in which those seeds were eliminated.

1. (South Africa) **David Adams** / (South Africa) **Robbie Koenig (champions)**
2. Unknown (withdrew)
3. (Sweden) Simon Aspelin / (Russia) Andrei Olhovskiy (semifinals)
4. (Russia) Denis Golovanov / (Russia) Marat Safin (semifinals)

== Draw ==
=== Key ===
- Q = Qualifier
- WC = Wild card
- LL = Lucky loser
- Alt = Alternate
- SE = Special exempt
- PR = Protected ranking
- ITF = ITF entry
- JE = Junior exempt
- w/o = Walkover
- r = Retired
- d = Defaulted
- SR = Special ranking

=== Finals ===
First round
1	(South Africa) **D Adams** (South Africa) **R Koenig**	**6**	**6**
(Croatia) I Ljubičić (Italy) D Sanguinetti	4	3
(Slovakia) **K Beck** (Belarus) **V Voltchkov**	**6**	**7^{7}**
WC	(Russia) K Ivanov-Smolensky (Uzbekistan) D Tomashevich	1	6^{2}
3	(Sweden) **S Aspelin** (Russia) **A Olhovskiy**	**6**	**6**
ALT	(Uzbekistan) S Ikramov (Uzbekistan) G Ishmatov	1	1
(Denmark) K Pless (Thailand) P Srichaphan	**7^{7}**	5	3
(Netherlands) **S Groen** (Germany) **A Waske**	6^{3}	**7**	**6**
(Argentina) D del Río (Australia) A Ross	2	1
(Israel) **J Erlich** (Israel) **H Levy**	**6**	**6**
(Germany) R Schüttler (Russia) M Youzhny	3	3
4	(Russia) **D Golovanov** (Russia) **M Safin**	**6**	**6**
WC	(Russia) N Davydenko (Uzbekistan) D Mazur	**6**	3	2
(Finland) **T Ketola** (Uzbekistan) **V Kutsenko**	4	**6**	**6**
WC	(Uzbekistan) M Inoyatov (Russia) D Sitak	4	2
ALT	(Netherlands) **R Sluiter** (Netherlands) **M Verkerk**	**6**	**6**

Quarterfinals
1	(South Africa) **D Adams** (South Africa) **R Koenig**	**7^{7}**	**6**
(Slovakia) K Beck (Belarus) V Voltchkov	6^{4}	1
3	(Sweden) **S Aspelin** (Russia) **A Olhovskiy**	**6**	**6**
(Netherlands) S Groen (Germany) A Waske	1	2
(Israel) J Erlich (Israel) H Levy	4	**7**	4
4	(Russia) **D Golovanov** (Russia) **M Safin**	**6**	5	**6**
(Finland) T Ketola (Uzbekistan) V Kutsenko	4	0
ALT	(Netherlands) **R Sluiter** (Netherlands) **M Verkerk**	**6**	**6**

Semifinals
1	(South Africa) **D Adams** (South Africa) **R Koenig**	**6**	**6**
3	(Sweden) S Aspelin (Russia) A Olhovskiy	3	2
4	(Russia) D Golovanov (Russia) M Safin	**6**	3	6^{3}
ALT	(Netherlands) **R Sluiter** (Netherlands) **M Verkerk**	4	**6**	**7^{7}**

Final
1	(South Africa) **David Adams** (South Africa) **Robbie Koenig**	**6**	**7**
ALT	(Netherlands) Raemon Sluiter (Netherlands) Martin Verkerk	2	5
