= 2002 Generali Open – Doubles =

Doubles
- 2002 Generali Open

Final
- Champions: (South Africa) Robbie Koenig (Japan) Thomas Shimada
- Runners-up: (Argentina) Lucas Arnold (Spain) Àlex Corretja
- Score: 7–6^{(7–3)}, 6–4

Details
- Draw: 24
- Seeds: 8

Events
Singles	Doubles
- Generali Open

Àlex Corretja and Luis Lobo were the defending champions but they competed with different partners that year, Corretja with Lucas Arnold and Lobo with Martín García.

García and Lobo lost in the first round to Joshua Eagle and Ben Ellwood.

Arnold and Corretja lost in the final 7–6^{(7–3)}, 6–4 against Robbie Koenig and Thomas Shimada.

== Seeds ==
Champion seeds are indicated in bold text while text in italics indicates the round in which those seeds were eliminated. All eight seeded teams received byes to the second round.

1. (Czech Republic) Martin Damm / (Czech Republic) Cyril Suk (quarterfinals)
2. (Czech Republic) Tomáš Cibulec / (Czech Republic) Daniel Vacek (second round)
3. (Australia) Wayne Arthurs / (Australia) Paul Hanley (quarterfinals)
4. (Czech Republic) Petr Pála / (Czech Republic) Pavel Vízner (semifinals)
5. (South Africa) **Robbie Koenig** / (Japan) **Thomas Shimada (champions)**
6. (Argentina) Gastón Etlis / (Argentina) Martín Rodríguez (quarterfinals)
7. (Australia) Andrew Kratzmann / (Russia) Andrei Olhovskiy (second round)
8. (Argentina) Lucas Arnold / (Spain) Àlex Corretja (final)

== Draw ==
Key

- Q = Qualifier
- WC = Wild card
- LL = Lucky loser
- Alt = Alternate
- ITF = ITF entry
- PR = Protected ranking
- SR = Special ranking
- SE = Special exempt
- JE = Junior exempt
- JR = Junior Accelerator Programme entrant
- CO = College Accelerator Programme entrant
- NG = Next Gen Accelerator Program entrant
- w/o = Walkover
- r = Retired
- d = Defaulted

=== Final ===
Final

5
- (South Africa) **Robbie Koenig**
- (Japan) **Thomas Shimada**
**7^{7}**
**6**

8
- (Argentina) Lucas Arnold
- (Spain) Àlex Corretja
6^{3}
4

=== Top half ===
First round

Second round

Quarterfinals

Semifinals

1
- (Czech Republic) **M Damm**
- (Czech Republic) **C Suk**
**6**
**6**

- (Sweden) S Aspelin
- (South Africa) C Haggard
**6**
1
3

- (Australia) S Huss
- (Australia) G Silcock
2
3

- (Australia) **S Huss**
- (Australia) **G Silcock**
2
**6**
**6**

1
- (Czech Republic) M Damm
- (Czech Republic) C Suk
3
4

- (Spain) **E Benfele Álvarez**
- (Argentina) **A Schneiter**
**6**
**6**

5
- (South Africa) **R Koenig**
- (Japan) **T Shimada**
**6**
**6**

- (Italy) M Bertolini
- (Italy) C Brandi
3
4

- (Spain) E Benfele Álvarez
- (Argentina) A Schneiter
3
4

5
- (South Africa) **R Koenig**
- (Japan) **T Shimada**
**6**
**6**

5
- (South Africa) **R Koenig**
- (Japan) **T Shimada**
**6**
**7**

4
- (Czech Republic) P Pála
- (Czech Republic) P Vízner
3
5

4
- (Czech Republic) **P Pála**
- (Czech Republic) **P Vízner**
**6**
**7^{7}**

- (Costa Rica) J A Marín
- (Spain) A Martín
3
2

- (Austria) S Koubek
- (Armenia) S Sargsian
2
6^{3}

- (Austria) **S Koubek**
- (Armenia) **S Sargsian**
**6**
**6**

4
- (Czech Republic) **P Pála**
- (Czech Republic) **P Vízner**
**6**
5
**7**

- (United States) **J Thomas**
- (Belgium) **T Vanhoudt**
4
**6**
**6**

- (United States) J Thomas
- (Belgium) T Vanhoudt
3
**7**
5

- (Italy) A Gaudenzi
- (Czech Republic) B Ulihrach
**6**
3
2

- (United States) **J Thomas**
- (Belgium) **T Vanhoudt**
**6**
**6**

7
- (Australia) A Kratzmann
- (Russia) A Olhovskiy
4
2

=== Bottom half ===
First round

Second round

Quarterfinals

Semifinals

8
- (Argentina) **L Arnold**
- (Spain) **À Corretja**
6^{4}
**7**
**6**

WC
- (Austria) O Marach
- (Austria) A Peya
3
4

WC
- (Australia) M Hill
- (Sweden) P Nyborg
**7^{7}**
5
4

WC
- (Australia) **M Hill**
- (Sweden) **P Nyborg**
**6**
**6**

8
- (Argentina) **L Arnold**
- (Spain) **À Corretja**
**7^{7}**
**6**

- (United States) **D Bowen**
- (Australia) **A Fisher**
**6**
**6**

3
- (Australia) W Arthurs
- (Australia) P Hanley
6^{4}
4

- (Ecuador) N Lapentti
- (Ecuador) L Morejón
1
3

- (United States) D Bowen
- (Australia) A Fisher
4
**6**
3

3
- (Australia) **W Arthurs**
- (Australia) **P Hanley**
**6**
1
**6**

8
- (Argentina) **L Arnold**
- (Spain) **À Corretja**
**6**
**6**

- (South Africa) M Barnard
- (Germany) M-K Goellner
3
1

6
- (Argentina) **G Etlis**
- (Argentina) **M Rodríguez**
**7^{7}**
**6**

- (Argentina) M García
- (Argentina) L Lobo
4
3

- (Australia) J Eagle
- (Australia) B Ellwood
6^{1}
2

- (Australia) **J Eagle**
- (Australia) **B Ellwood**
**6**
**6**

6
- (Argentina) G Etlis
- (Argentina) M Rodríguez
3
3

- (South Africa) **M Barnard**
- (Germany) **M-K Goellner**
4
**6**
**7^{7}**

- (South Africa) **M Barnard**
- (Germany) **M-K Goellner**
**6**
**6**

WC
- (Austria) M Hipfl
- (Spain) F Vicente
**6**
1
6^{3}

- (South Africa) **M Barnard**
- (Germany) **M-K Goellner**
**6**
**6**

2
- (Czech Republic) T Cibulec
- (Czech Republic) D Vacek
3
3
