= 2002 President's Cup =

- Date: 9–14 September
- Edition: 6th
- Category: International Series
- Draw: 32S / 16D
- Prize money: $525,000
- Surface: Hard / outdoor
- Location: Tashkent, Uzbekistan

Champions

Singles
- (Russia) Yevgeny Kafelnikov

Doubles
- (South Africa) David Adams / (South Africa) Robbie Koenig
- ATP Tashkent Open

The 2002 President's Cup was a men's tennis tournament played on outdoor hardcourts in Tashkent in Uzbekistan and was part of the International Series of the 2002 ATP Tour. The tournament ran from 9 September through 14 September 2002. Third-seeded Yevgeny Kafelnikov won the singles title.

== Finals ==
=== Singles ===
(Russia) Yevgeny Kafelnikov defeated (Belarus) Vladimir Voltchkov, 7–6^{(8–6)}, 7–5.

- It was Kafelnikov's 3rd title of the year and the 51st of his career.

=== Doubles ===
(South Africa) David Adams / (South Africa) Robbie Koenig defeated (Netherlands) Raemon Sluiter / (Netherlands) Martin Verkerk, 6–2, 7–5.

- It was Adams' 1st title of the year and the 17th of his career. It was Koenig's 2nd title of the year and the 2nd of his career.

== See also ==
- 2002 Tashkent Open
