= 2001 Heineken Open Shanghai =

- Date: 17–23 September
- Edition: 6th
- Category: International Series
- Draw: 32S / 16D
- Prize money: $375,000
- Location: Shanghai, China
- Venue: Xianxia Tennis Center

Champions

Singles
- (Germany) Rainer Schüttler

Doubles
- (Zimbabwe) Byron Black / (Japan) Thomas Shimada
- Heineken Open Shanghai

The 2001 Heineken Open Shanghai was a men's tennis tournament played on outdoor hard courts in Shanghai, China and was part of the International Series of the 2001 ATP Tour. It was the sixth edition of the tournament and ran from 17 September through 23 September 2001. Second-seeded Rainer Schüttler won the singles title.

== Finals ==
=== Singles ===
(Germany) Rainer Schüttler defeated (Switzerland) Michel Kratochvil 6–3, 6–4

- It was Schüttler's only singles title of the year and the 2nd of his career.

=== Doubles ===
(Zimbabwe) Byron Black / (Japan) Thomas Shimada defeated (South Africa) John-Laffnie de Jager / (South Africa) Robbie Koenig 6–2, 3–6, 7–5

- It was Black's 2nd title of the year and the 24th of his career. It was Shimada's only title of the year and the 1st of his career.
