= 2003 Generali Open – Singles =

Singles
- 2003 Generali Open

Final
- Champion: (Argentina) Guillermo Coria
- Runner-up: (Chile) Nicolás Massú
- Score: 6–1, 6–4, 6–2

Details
- Draw: 48
- Seeds: 16

Events
Singles	Doubles
- Generali Open

Àlex Corretja was the defending champion but lost in the second round to Werner Eschauer.

Guillermo Coria won in the final 6–1, 6–4, 6–2 against Nicolás Massú.

== Seeds ==
A champion seed is indicated in bold text while text in italics indicates the round in which that seed was eliminated. All sixteen seeds received a bye to the second round.

1. (Spain) Juan Carlos Ferrero (quarterfinals)
2. (Argentina) **Guillermo Coria (champion)**
3. (Germany) Rainer Schüttler (second round)
4. (Spain) Albert Costa (second round)
5. (Morocco) Younes El Aynaoui (third round)
6. (Russia) Mikhail Youzhny (second round)
7. (Argentina) Gastón Gaudio (quarterfinals)
8. (Argentina) Juan Ignacio Chela (quarterfinals)
9. (Argentina) Mariano Zabaleta (semifinals)
10. (Belarus) Max Mirnyi (third round)
11. (Russia) Nikolay Davydenko (third round)
12. (Spain) Àlex Corretja (second round)
13. (Spain) Feliciano López (semifinals)
14. (Armenia) Sargis Sargsian (third round)
15. (Brazil) Flávio Saretta (third round)
16. (Spain) David Sánchez (second round)

== Draw ==
Key

- Q = Qualifier
- WC = Wild card
- LL = Lucky loser
- Alt = Alternate
- ITF = ITF entry
- PR = Protected ranking
- SR = Special ranking
- SE = Special exempt
- JE = Junior exempt
- JR = Junior Accelerator Programme entrant
- CO = College Accelerator Programme entrant
- NG = Next Gen Accelerator Program entrant
- w/o = Walkover
- r = Retired
- d = Defaulted

=== Finals ===
Semifinals
9	(Argentina) Mariano Zabaleta	2	1
(Chile) **Nicolás Massú**	**6**	**6**
13	(Spain) Feliciano López	1	2
2	(Argentina) **Guillermo Coria**	**6**	**6**

Final
(Chile) Nicolás Massú	1	4	2
2	(Argentina) **Guillermo Coria**	**6**	**6**	**6**

=== Top half ===
==== Section 1 ====
First round
(France) A Dupuis	**6**	6^{5}	4
(Spain) **F Verdasco**	1	**7^{7}**	**6**
(Argentina) F Squillari	5	**6**	1
Q	(Argentina) **G Etlis**	**7**	4	**6**
(Romania) **V Hănescu**	**6**	**6**
(Austria) M Hipfl	4	0
(France) J Boutter	3	3
(Switzerland) **M Kratochvil**	**6**	**6**

Second round
1	(Spain) **J C Ferrero**	**7^{7}**	**7^{7}**
(Spain) F Verdasco	6^{3}	6^{2}
Q	(Argentina) G Etlis	6^{3}	1
15	(Brazil) **F Saretta**	**7^{7}**	**6**
9	(Argentina) **M Zabaleta**	**6**	**7**
(Romania) V Hănescu	2	5
(Switzerland) M Kratochvil	**7^{7}**	1	6^{3}
5	(Morocco) **Y El Aynaoui**	6^{4}	**6**	**7^{7}**

Third round
1	(Spain) **J C Ferrero**	**7^{7}**	**6**
15	(Brazil) F Saretta	6^{4}	3
9	(Argentina) **M Zabaleta**	w/o
5	(Morocco) Y El Aynaoui

Quarterfinals
1	(Spain) J C Ferrero	1	4
9	(Argentina) **M Zabaleta**	**6**	**6**

==== Section 2 ====
First round
(Chile) **N Massú**	**6**	3	**6**
(Austria) S Koubek	4	**6**	4
(Spain) **A Portas**	**6**	**6**
WC	(Czech Republic) B Ulihrach	4	2
WC	(Austria) **A Peya**	4	**6**	**7^{8}**
(Spain) G Blanco	**6**	3	6^{6}
(Ecuador) **N Lapentti**	**7^{10}**	**6**
(Australia) W Arthurs	6^{8}	3

Second round
4	(Spain) A Costa	**7^{11}**	5	6^{0}
(Chile) **N Massú**	6^{9}	**7**	**7^{7}**
(Spain) A Portas	6^{4}	1
14	(Armenia) **S Sargsian**	**7^{7}**	**6**
11	(Russia) **N Davydenko**	**6**	**6**
WC	(Austria) A Peya	2	3
(Ecuador) **N Lapentti**	**6**	**6**
6	(Russia) M Youzhny	3	3

Third round
(Chile) **N Massú**	**6**	**6**
14	(Armenia) S Sargsian	2	2
11	(Russia) N Davydenko	3	1
(Ecuador) **N Lapentti**	**6**	**6**

Quarterfinals
(Chile) **N Massú**	**7**	**6**
(Ecuador) N Lapentti	5	4

=== Bottom half ===
==== Section 3 ====
First round
(Germany) **T Behrend**	**6**	3	**6**
(Spain) Ó Hernández	4	**6**	3
(Austria) **W Eschauer**	6^{3}	**6**	**6**
(Germany) A Waske	**7^{7}**	1	3
Q	(Czech Republic) R Vik	3	**6**	2
WC	(Romania) **F Mergea**	**6**	3	**6**
WC	(Austria) I Neumüller	2	2
(France) **P-H Mathieu**	**6**	**6**

Second round
7	(Argentina) **G Gaudio**	**6**	**6**
(Germany) T Behrend	4	3
(Austria) **W Eschauer**	**6**	**6**
12	(Spain) À Corretja	4	4
13	(Spain) **F López**	**6**	**6**
WC	(Romania) F Mergea	3	4
(France) **P-H Mathieu**	**6**	3	**6**
3	(Germany) R Schüttler	4	**6**	3

Third round
7	(Argentina) **G Gaudio**	**6**	3	**6**
(Austria) W Eschauer	4	**6**	4
13	(Spain) **F López**	3	**6**	**3**
(France) P-H Mathieu	**6**	3	0/r

Quarterfinals
7	(Argentina) G Gaudio	2	**7^{7}**	5
13	(Spain) **F López**	**6**	6^{2}	**7**

==== Section 4 ====
First round
(Austria) J Melzer	5	2
Q	(Czech Republic) **F Čermák**	**7**	**6**
(Peru) **L Horna**	**6**	**6**
Q	(Austria) D Köllerer	3	2
Q	(Italy) A Seppi	3	4
(France) **O Mutis**	**6**	**6**
Q	(Germany) O Gross	4	4
(Sweden) **A Vinciguerra**	**6**	**6**

Second round
8	(Argentina) **J I Chela**	**6**	**6**
Q	(Czech Republic) F Čermák	1	3
(Peru) L Horna	3	2
10	(Belarus) **M Mirnyi**	**6**	**6**
16	(Spain) D Sánchez	2	4
(France) **O Mutis**	**6**	**6**
(Sweden) A Vinciguerra	4	3
2	(Argentina) **G Coria**	**6**	**6**

Third round
8	(Argentina) **J I Chela**	**6**	3	**7^{8}**
10	(Belarus) M Mirnyi	4	**6**	6^{6}
(France) O Mutis	1	0
2	(Argentina) **G Coria**	**6**	**6**

Quarterfinals
8	(Argentina) J I Chela	3	2
2	(Argentina) **G Coria**	**6**	**6**
