= 2001 Heineken Open Shanghai – Doubles =

Doubles
- 2001 Heineken Open Shanghai
- 2000 Champions: (Netherlands) Paul Haarhuis (Netherlands) Sjeng Schalken

Final
- Champions: (Zimbabwe) Byron Black (Japan) Thomas Shimada
- Runners-up: (South Africa) John-Laffnie de Jager (South Africa) Robbie Koenig
- Score: 6–2, 3–6, 7–5

Events
Singles	Doubles
← 2000 ·	Heineken Open Shanghai	· 2002 →

Paul Haarhuis and Sjeng Schalken were the defending champions but did not compete that year.

Byron Black and Thomas Shimada won in the final 6–2, 3–6, 7–5 against John-Laffnie de Jager and Robbie Koenig.

== Seeds ==
Champion seeds are indicated in bold text while text in italics indicates the round in which those seeds were eliminated.

1. (Zimbabwe) **Byron Black** / (Japan) **Thomas Shimada (champions)**
2. (United States) Scott Humphries / (United States) Jim Thomas (first round)
3. (South Africa) John-Laffnie de Jager / (South Africa) Robbie Koenig (final)
4. (Czech Republic) Petr Luxa / (Czech Republic) Radek Štěpánek (quarterfinals)

== Draw ==
=== Key ===
- Q = Qualifier
- WC = Wild card
- LL = Lucky loser
- Alt = Alternate
- ITF = ITF entry
- PR = Protected ranking
- SR = Special ranking
- SE = Special exempt
- JE = Junior exempt
- JR = Junior Accelerator Programme entrant
- CO = College Accelerator Programme entrant
- NG = Next Gen Accelerator Program entrant
- w/o = Walkover
- r = Retired
- d = Defaulted

First round
1	(Zimbabwe) **B Black** (Japan) **T Shimada**	**6**	**7^{7}**
(Germany) K Braasch (Germany) L Burgsmüller	2	6^{5}
WC	(Australia) **A Ilie** (Switzerland) **M Kratochvil**	0	**7^{7}**	**6**
(Australia) P Hanley (Australia) N Healey	**6**	6^{5}	1
4	(Czech Republic) **P Luxa** (Czech Republic) **R Štěpánek**	**6**	**6**
WC	(China) R Xu (China) S-X Zeng	4	3
(Sweden) J Landsberg (United States) J Waite	**6**	5	5
(United States) **J Gimelstob** (United States) **M Russell**	1	**7**	**7**
(Switzerland) I Heuberger (Germany) R Schüttler	3	4
WC	(Spain) **Á Calatrava** (Spain) **F Clavet**	**6**	**6**
(South Korea) H-T Lee (United States) C Mamiit	3	**6**	3
3	(South Africa) **J-L de Jager** (South Africa) **R Koenig**	**6**	2	**6**
(South Africa) N Godwin (The Bahamas) M Merklein	2	2
(Switzerland) **G Bastl** (Brazil) **A Sá**	**6**	**6**
WC	(Hong Kong) J Hui (Australia) A Ross	**6**	6^{5}	**7^{7}**
2	(United States) S Humphries (United States) J Thomas	4	**7^{7}**	6^{3}

Quarterfinals
1	(Zimbabwe) **B Black** (Japan) **T Shimada**	**7^{7}**	**6**
WC	(Australia) A Ilie (Switzerland) M Kratochvil	6^{5}	4
4	(Czech Republic) P Luxa (Czech Republic) R Štěpánek	3	4
(United States) **J Gimelstob** (United States) **M Russell**	**6**	**6**
WC	(Spain) Á Calatrava (Spain) F Clavet	4	3
3	(South Africa) **J-L de Jager** (South Africa) **R Koenig**	**6**	**6**
(Switzerland) **G Bastl** (Brazil) **A Sá**	**6**	**6**
WC	(Hong Kong) J Hui (Australia) A Ross	1	2

Semifinals
1	(Zimbabwe) **B Black** (Japan) **T Shimada**	**w/o**
(United States) J Gimelstob (United States) M Russell
3	(South Africa) **J-L de Jager** (South Africa) **R Koenig**	**6**	**6**
(Switzerland) G Bastl (Brazil) A Sá	4	2

Final
1	(Zimbabwe) **Byron Black** (Japan) **Thomas Shimada**	**6**	3	**7**
3	(South Africa) John-Laffnie de Jager (South Africa) Robbie Koenig	2	**6**	5
