= 2002 Monte Carlo Masters – Singles =

Singles
- 2002 Monte Carlo Masters

Final
- Champion: (Spain) Juan Carlos Ferrero
- Runner-up: (Spain) Carlos Moyá
- Score: 7–5, 6–3, 6–4

Details
- Draw: 64 (8Q / 4WC)
- Seeds: 16

Events
Singles	Doubles
← 2001 ·	Monte Carlo Masters	· 2003 →

Juan Carlos Ferrero defeated Carlos Moyá in the final, 7–5, 6–3, 6–4 to win the singles tennis title at the 2002 Monte Carlo Masters.

Gustavo Kuerten was the reigning champion, but did not compete that year.

== Seeds ==
A champion seed is indicated in bold text while text in italics indicates the round in which that seed was eliminated.

1. (Australia) Lleyton Hewitt (first round)
2. (Spain) **Juan Carlos Ferrero (champion)**
3. (Russia) Yevgeny Kafelnikov (first round)
4. (United Kingdom) Tim Henman (semifinals)
5. (Germany) Tommy Haas (quarterfinals)
6. (Russia) Marat Safin (quarterfinals)
7. (France) Sébastien Grosjean (semifinals)
8. (Sweden) Thomas Johansson (quarterfinals)
9. (Switzerland) Roger Federer (second round)
10. (United States) Andy Roddick (third round)
11. (Czech Republic) Jiří Novák (third round)
12. (Argentina) Guillermo Cañas (second round)
13. (Spain) Àlex Corretja (third round)
14. (Sweden) Thomas Enqvist (first round)
15. (Morocco) Younes El Aynaoui (second round)
16. (Ecuador) Nicolás Lapentti (first round)

== Draw ==
=== Key ===
- Q = Qualifier
- WC = Wild card
- LL = Lucky loser
- Alt = Alternate
- SE = Special exempt
- PR = Protected ranking
- ITF = ITF entry
- JE = Junior exempt
- w/o = Walkover
- r = Retired
- d = Defaulted
- SR = Special ranking

=== Finals ===
Quarterfinals
**(Spain) Carlos Moyá**	**6**	2	**7^{7}**
6	(Russia) Marat Safin	1	**6**	6^{4}
4	**(United Kingdom) Tim Henman**	2	**6**	**7^{7}**
8	(Sweden) Thomas Johansson	**6**	4	6^{4}
7	**(France) Sebastien Grosjean**	**6**	**6**
(Spain) Albert Costa	4	2
5	(Germany) Tommy Haas	3	1
2	**(Spain) Juan Carlos Ferrero**	**6**	**6**

Semifinals
(Spain) **Carlos Moyá**	**6**	5	**6**
4	(United Kingdom) Tim Henman	4	**7**	3
7	(France) Sébastien Grosjean	3	**6**	0
2	(Spain) **Juan Carlos Ferrero**	**6**	1	**6**

Final
(Spain) Carlos Moyá	5	3	4
2	(Spain) **Juan Carlos Ferrero**	**7**	**6**	**6**

=== Top half ===
==== Section 1 ====
First round
1	(Australia) L Hewitt	4	3
(Spain) **C Moyá**	**6**	**6**
(Switzerland) **M Kratochvil**	0	**6**	**6**
(Belarus) M Mirnyi	**6**	3	4
(Italy) **A Gaudenzi**	5	**6**	**6**
(Sweden) J Björkman	**7**	2	3
(United States) J-M Gambill	5	6^{5}
13	(Spain) **À Corretja**	**7**	**7^{7}**
9	(Switzerland) **R Federer**	**7^{7}**	**6**
Q	(Argentina) M Zabaleta	6^{2}	4
(Argentina) **D Nalbandian**	**7^{7}**	6^{4}	**6**
(Germany) R Schüttler	6^{1}	**7^{7}**	2
(Argentina) F Squillari	6^{5}	**6**	5
Q	(France) **R Gasquet**	**7^{7}**	3	**7**
(Spain) T Robredo	**6**	3	2
6	(Russia) **M Safin**	4	**6**	**6**

Second round
(Spain) **C Moyá**	**6**	4	**6**
(Switzerland) M Kratochvil	2	**6**	4
(Italy) A Gaudenzi	3	3
13	(Spain) **À Corretja**	**6**	**6**
9	(Switzerland) R Federer	2	1
(Argentina) **D Nalbandian**	**6**	**6**
Q	(France) R Gasquet	4	1
6	(Russia) **M Safin**	**6**	**6**

Third round
(Spain) **C Moyá**	**6**	**7**
13	(Spain) À Corretja	1	5
(Argentina) D Nalbandian	1	**7^{7}**	2
6	(Russia) **M Safin**	**6**	6^{5}	**6**

Quarterfinals
(Spain) **C Moyá**	**6**	2	**7^{7}**
6	(Russia) M Safin	1	**6**	6^{4}

==== Section 2 ====
First round
4	(United Kingdom) **T Henman**	6^{5}	**7**	**6**
WC	(Argentina) G Coria	**7^{7}**	5	1
WC	(Italy) D Sanguinetti	**7**	0	3
(Chile) **N Massú**	5	**6**	**6**
(Morocco) **H Arazi**	**6**	**6**
(France) A Clément	3	3
(Argentina) **J I Chela**	**6**	**6**
14	(Sweden) T Enqvist	1	1
12	(Argentina) **G Cañas**	**6**	**6**
Q	(Brazil) A Sá	1	0
(Romania) **A Pavel**	3	**6**	**6**
Q	(Denmark) K Pless	**6**	3	1
(Spain) A Montañés	**6**	2	4
(Austria) **S Koubek**	4	**6**	**6**
(Sweden) M Norman	**6**	6^{4}	1
8	(Sweden) **T Johansson**	2	**7^{7}**	**6**

Second round
4	(United Kingdom) **T Henman**	**6**	**7^{7}**
(Chile) N Massú	1	6^{3}
(Morocco) H Arazi	1	1
(Argentina) **J I Chela**	**6**	**6**
12	(Argentina) G Cañas	4	**7**	6^{3}
(Romania) **A Pavel**	**6**	5	**7^{7}**
(Austria) S Koubek	4	1
8	(Sweden) **T Johansson**	**6**	**6**

Third round
4	(United Kingdom) **T Henman**	**6**	6^{4}	**6**
(Argentina) J I Chela	2	**7^{7}**	4
(Romania) A Pavel	**6**	4	5
8	(Sweden) **T Johansson**	1	**6**	**7**

Quarterfinals
4	(United Kingdom) **T Henman**	2	**6**	**7^{7}**
8	(Sweden) T Johansson	**6**	4	6^{4}

=== Bottom half ===
==== Section 3 ====
First round
7	(France) **S Grosjean**	**6**	**6**
(Australia) M Philippoussis	4	4
(Slovakia) **D Hrbatý**	**6**	**6**
(Sweden) A Vinciguerra	4	4
Q	(France) **N Coutelot**	**6**	2	**6**
(Spain) F Clavet	4	**6**	3
WC	(France) C Pioline	4	**6**	4
11	(Czech Republic) **J Novák**	**6**	4	**6**
16	(Ecuador) N Lapentti	6^{6}	2
WC	(France) **M Llodra**	**7^{8}**	**6**
(Spain) **A Costa**	**6**	**6**
(United States) J Blake	4	4
(Netherlands) S Schalken	6^{1}	2
(Spain) **A Martín**	**7^{7}**	**6**
Q	(Austria) **M Hipfl**	**6**	**6**
3	(Russia) Y Kafelnikov	1	2

Second round
7	(France) **S Grosjean**	**6**	**7^{9}**
(Slovakia) D Hrbatý	3	6^{7}
Q	(France) N Coutelot	**6**	2	3
11	(Czech Republic) **J Novák**	3	**6**	**6**
WC	(France) M Llodra	4	1
(Spain) **A Costa**	**6**	**6**
(Spain) **A Martín**	1	**7**	**6**
Q	(Austria) M Hipfl	**6**	5	1

Third round
7	(France) **S Grosjean**	**6**	**7^{8}**
11	(Czech Republic) J Novák	1	6^{6}
(Spain) **A Costa**	**7**	**6**
(Spain) A Martín	5	3

Quarterfinals
7	(France) **S Grosjean**	**6**	**6**
(Spain) A Costa	4	2

==== Section 4 ====
First round
5	(Germany) **T Haas**	**6**	**6**
(France) N Escudé	4	2
(Germany) N Kiefer	3	5
Q	(Hungary) **A Sávolt**	**6**	**7**
(Croatia) I Ljubičić	**6**	3	4
(Czech Republic) **B Ulihrach**	1	**6**	**6**
Q	(Chile) F González	6^{4}	6^{7}
10	(United States) **A Roddick**	**7^{7}**	**7^{9}**
15	(Morocco) **Y El Aynaoui**	**6**	**6**
(Argentina) A Calleri	3	4
(France) F Santoro	3	2
(Chile) **M Ríos**	**6**	**6**
(Belgium) X Malisse	3	1
(Spain) **F Mantilla**	**6**	**6**
(Spain) A Portas	2	2
2	(Spain) **J C Ferrero**	**6**	**6**

Second round
5	(Germany) **T Haas**	**7**	3	**6**
Q	(Hungary) A Sávolt	5	**6**	3
(Czech Republic) B Ulihrach	6^{7}	6^{3}
10	(United States) **A Roddick**	**7^{9}**	**7^{7}**
15	(Morocco) Y El Aynaoui	**6**	3	4
(Chile) **M Ríos**	1	**6**	**6**
(Spain) F Mantilla	1	**6**	6^{3}
2	(Spain) **J C Ferrero**	**6**	3	**7^{7}**

Third round
5	(Germany) **T Haas**	**6**	**6**
10	(United States) A Roddick	3	2
(Chile) M Ríos	0	0^{r}
2	(Spain) **J C Ferrero**	**6**	2

Quarterfinals
5	(Germany) T Haas	3	1
2	(Spain) **J C Ferrero**	**6**	**6**

== Qualifying ==
=== Qualifying seeds ===
1. (Chile) **Fernando González (qualified)**
2. (Argentina) Gastón Gaudio (qualifying competition)
3. (Argentina) **Mariano Zabaleta (qualified)**
4. (Romania) Adrian Voinea (qualifying competition)
5. (Thailand) Paradorn Srichaphan (first round)
6. (Spain) Fernando Vicente (first round)
7. (France) Antony Dupuis (qualifying competition)
8. (Denmark) **Kristian Pless (qualified)**
9. (Hungary) **Attila Sávolt (qualified)**
10. (Austria) **Markus Hipfl (qualified)**
11. (Spain) Galo Blanco (qualifying competition)
12. (Russia) Nikolay Davydenko (first round)
13. (Georgia (country)) Irakli Labadze (first round)
14. (Brazil) **André Sá (qualified)**
15. (Argentina) José Acasuso (first round)
16. (Spain) Joan Balcells (first round)

=== Qualifiers ===
1. (Chile) **Fernando González**
2. (Brazil) **André Sá**
3. (Argentina) **Mariano Zabaleta**
4. (France) **Richard Gasquet**
5. (France) **Nicolas Coutelot**
6. (Austria) **Markus Hipfl**
7. (Hungary) **Attila Sávolt**
8. (Denmark) **Kristian Pless**

=== Qualifying draw ===
==== First qualifier ====
First round
1	**(Chile) Fernando González**	**6**	**6**
(Italy) Stefano Galvani	4	0
**(Sweden) Magnus Larsson**	**6**	**6**
16	(Spain) Joan Balcells	1	3

Qualifying competition
1	**(Chile) Fernando González**	**7^{7}**	4	**6**
(Sweden) Magnus Larsson	6^{5}	**6**	1

==== Second qualifier ====
First round
2	**(Argentina) Gastón Gaudio**	**6**	**6**
(Switzerland) Ivo Heuberger	3	2
(Costa Rica) Juan Antonio Marín	**6**	2	2
14	**(Brazil) André Sá**	4	**6**	**6**

Qualifying competition
2	(Argentina) Gastón Gaudio	2	**6**	3
14	**(Brazil) André Sá**	**6**	2	**6**

==== Third qualifier ====
First round
3	**(Argentina) Mariano Zabaleta**	4	**7**	**6**
(Russia) Andrei Stoliarov	**6**	5	3
WC	**(France) Julien Benneteau**	**7^{8}**	**6**
15	(Argentina) José Acasuso	6^{6}	1

Qualifying competition
3	**(Argentina) Mariano Zabaleta**	**6**	**6**
WC	(France) Julien Benneteau	4	4

==== Fourth qualifier ====
First round
4	**(Romania) Adrian Voinea**	**7^{8}**	**6**
(Spain) Feliciano López	6^{6}	3
WC	**(France) Richard Gasquet**	**6**	**6**
12	(Russia) Nikolay Davydenko	1	1

Qualifying competition
4	(Romania) Adrian Voinea	3	4
WC	**(France) Richard Gasquet**	**6**	**6**

==== Fifth qualifier ====
First round
5	(Thailand) Paradorn Srichaphan	4	1
WC	**(Spain) Carlos Cuadrado**	**6**	**6**
**(France) Nicolas Coutelot**	4	**6**	**6**
13	(Georgia (country)) Irakli Labadze	**6**	4	4

Qualifying competition
WC	(Spain) Carlos Cuadrado	3	**7**	4
**(France) Nicolas Coutelot**	**6**	5	**6**

==== Sixth qualifier ====
First round
6	(Spain) Fernando Vicente	**7**	3	4
**(Italy) Giorgio Galimberti**	5	**6**	**6**
(Spain) Marc López	3	3
10	**(Austria) Markus Hipfl**	**6**	**6**

Qualifying competition
(Italy) Giorgio Galimberti	5	4
10	**(Austria) Markus Hipfl**	**7**	**6**

==== Seventh qualifier ====
First round
7	**(France) Antony Dupuis**	**6**	3	**7**
(Italy) Federico Luzzi	4	**6**	5
(Austria) Jürgen Melzer	4	3
9	**(Hungary) Attila Sávolt**	**6**	**6**

Qualifying competition
7	(France) Antony Dupuis	**7**	5	2
9	**(Hungary) Attila Sávolt**	5	**7**	**6**

==== Eighth qualifier ====
First round
8	**(Denmark) Kristian Pless**	**6**	**6**
(Switzerland) Marc Rosset	3	4
WC	(France) Arnaud Di Pasquale	5	**6**	0
11	**(Spain) Galo Blanco**	**7**	4	**6**

Qualifying competition
8	**(Denmark) Kristian Pless**	**6**	**6**
11	(Spain) Galo Blanco	2	0
