= 2003 Monte Carlo Masters – Doubles =

Doubles
- 2003 Monte Carlo Masters

Final
- Champions: (India) Mahesh Bhupathi (Belarus) Max Mirnyi
- Runners-up: (France) Michaël Llodra (France) Fabrice Santoro
- Score: 6–4, 3–6, 7–6^{(8–6)}

Events
Singles	Doubles
← 2002 ·	Monte Carlo Masters	· 2004 →

Jonas Björkman and Todd Woodbridge were the defending champions but lost in the second round to František Čermák and Leoš Friedl.

Mahesh Bhupathi and Max Mirnyi won in the final 6–4, 3–6, 7–6^{(8–6)} against Michaël Llodra and Fabrice Santoro.

== Seeds ==
All eight seeded teams received byes to the second round.

1. (The Bahamas) Mark Knowles / (Canada) Daniel Nestor (second round)
2. (Sweden) Jonas Björkman / (Australia) Todd Woodbridge (second round)
3. (India) Mahesh Bhupathi / (Belarus) Max Mirnyi (champions)
4. (United States) Bob Bryan / (United States) Mike Bryan (quarterfinals)
5. (India) Leander Paes / (Czech Republic) David Rikl (second round)
6. (Czech Republic) Martin Damm / (Czech Republic) Cyril Suk (quarterfinals)
7. (Netherlands) Paul Haarhuis / (Russia) Yevgeny Kafelnikov (quarterfinals)
8. (United States) Donald Johnson / (Zimbabwe) Kevin Ullyett (semifinals)

== Draw ==
=== Key ===
- Q = Qualifier
- WC = Wild card
- LL = Lucky loser
- Alt = Alternate
- SE = Special exempt
- PR = Protected ranking
- ITF = ITF entry
- JE = Junior exempt
- w/o = Walkover
- r = Retired
- d = Defaulted
- SR = Special ranking

=== Finals ===
Semifinals

Final

8
- (United States) Donald Johnson
- (Zimbabwe) Kevin Ullyett
7^{7}
2
2

- (France) Michaël Llodra
- (France) Fabrice Santoro
6^{3}
6
6

- (France) Michaël Llodra
- (France) Fabrice Santoro
4
6
6^{6}

3
- (India) Mahesh Bhupathi
- (Belarus) Max Mirnyi
6
3
7^{8}

3
- (India) Mahesh Bhupathi
- (Belarus) Max Mirnyi
6
7^{15}

- (Czech Republic) František Čermák
- (Czech Republic) Leoš Friedl
3
6^{13}

=== Top half ===
First round

Second round

Quarterfinals

Semifinals

1
- (The Bahamas) M Knowles
- (Canada) D Nestor
7^{7}
2
4

- (Chile) F González
- (Spain) T Robredo
0
6^{3}

- (Australia) W Arthurs
- (Australia) P Hanley
6^{5}
6
6

- (Australia) W Arthurs
- (Australia) P Hanley
6
7^{7}

- (Australia) W Arthurs
- (Australia) P Hanley
4
4

- (Argentina) G Coria
- (Argentina) G Gaudio
4
6
6

8
- (United States) D Johnson
- (Zimbabwe) K Ullyett
6
6

- (Argentina) G Etlis
- (Argentina) M Rodríguez
6
4
3

- (Argentina) G Coria
- (Argentina) G Gaudio
6^{3}
4

8
- (United States) D Johnson
- (Zimbabwe) K Ullyett
7^{7}
6

8
- (United States) D Johnson
- (Zimbabwe) K Ullyett
7^{7}
2
2

- (France) M Llodra
- (France) F Santoro
6^{3}
6
6

4
- (United States) B Bryan
- (United States) M Bryan
6
7^{7}

- (United States) G Oliver
- (United States) A Roddick
7^{7}
3
6^{5}

- (Australia) J Eagle
- (United States) J Palmer
1
6^{2}

- (Australia) J Eagle
- (United States) J Palmer
6^{5}
6
7^{7}

4
- (United States) B Bryan
- (United States) M Bryan
4
6
3

- (France) M Llodra
- (France) F Santoro
6
6

- (France) M Llodra
- (France) F Santoro
6
3
6

WC
- (France) A Dupuis
- (France) P-H Mathieu
2
3

- (France) M Llodra
- (France) F Santoro
6
6

5
- (India) L Paes
- (Czech Republic) D Rikl
3
1

=== Bottom half ===
First round

Second round

Quarterfinals

Semifinals

7
- (Netherlands) P Haarhuis
- (Russia) Y Kafelnikov
6^{5}
6
6

- (Argentina) L Arnold
- (Argentina) D Nalbandian
5
3

- (South Africa) C Haggard
- (South Africa) R Koenig
7^{7}
0
2

- (South Africa) C Haggard
- (South Africa) R Koenig
7
6

7
- (Netherlands) P Haarhuis
- (Russia) Y Kafelnikov
2
1

- (Czech Republic) T Cibulec
- (Czech Republic) P Vízner
2
0

3
- (India) M Bhupathi
- (Belarus) M Mirnyi
6
6

- (Czech Republic) J Novák
- (Czech Republic) R Štěpánek
6
6

- (Czech Republic) J Novák
- (Czech Republic) R Štěpánek
3
6
3

3
- (India) M Bhupathi
- (Belarus) M Mirnyi
6
1
6

3
- (India) M Bhupathi
- (Belarus) M Mirnyi
6
7^{15}

- (Czech Republic) F Čermák
- (Czech Republic) L Friedl
3
6^{13}

6
- (Czech Republic) M Damm
- (Czech Republic) C Suk
4
7
6

- (Finland) J Nieminen
- (Germany) R Schüttler
6
7^{7}

- (Finland) J Nieminen
- (Germany) R Schüttler
6
5
2

- (South Africa) D Adams
- (Netherlands) S Schalken
4
6^{5}

6
- (Czech Republic) M Damm
- (Czech Republic) C Suk
4
7
5

WC
- (France) A Clément
- (France) N Escudé
6^{4}
6
3

- (Czech Republic) F Čermák
- (Czech Republic) L Friedl
6
5
7

- (Czech Republic) F Čermák
- (Czech Republic) L Friedl
7^{7}
4
6

- (Czech Republic) F Čermák
- (Czech Republic) L Friedl
3
6
6

2
- (Sweden) J Björkman
- (Australia) T Woodbridge
6
1
4
