= 2002 President's Cup – Singles =

Singles
- 2002 President's Cup
- 2001 Champion: (Russia) Marat Safin

Final
- Champion: (Russia) Yevgeny Kafelnikov
- Runner-up: (Belarus) Vladimir Voltchkov
- Score: 7–6^{(8–6)}, 7–5

Events
Singles	Doubles
- ATP Tashkent Open

Marat Safin was the defending champion but lost in the quarterfinals to Paradorn Srichaphan.

Yevgeny Kafelnikov won in the final 7–6^{(8–6)}, 7–5 against Vladimir Voltchkov.

== Seeds ==
A champion seed is indicated in bold text while text in italics indicates the round in which that seed was eliminated.

1. (Russia) Marat Safin (quarterfinals)
2. (Germany) Tommy Haas (quarterfinals)
3. (Russia) **Yevgeny Kafelnikov (champion)**
4. (Germany) Rainer Schüttler (first round)
5. (Thailand) Paradorn Srichaphan (semifinals)
6. (Croatia) Ivan Ljubičić (quarterfinals)
7. (Russia) Mikhail Youzhny (second round)
8. (Italy) Davide Sanguinetti (semifinals)

== Draw ==
Key

- Q = Qualifier
- WC = Wild card
- LL = Lucky loser
- Alt = Alternate
- ITF = ITF entry
- PR = Protected ranking
- SR = Special ranking
- SE = Special exempt
- JE = Junior exempt
- JR = Junior Accelerator Programme entrant
- CO = College Accelerator Programme entrant
- NG = Next Gen Accelerator Program entrant
- w/o = Walkover
- r = Retired
- d = Defaulted

=== Finals ===
First round
1	(Russia) **M Safin**	**6**	**6**
Q	(France) G Carraz	2	4
(Netherlands) R Sluiter	1	6^{5}
(Slovakia) **K Beck**	**6**	**7^{7}**
(Israel) **H Levy**	**6**	**7^{11}**
(Russia) N Davydenko	4	6^{9}
(France) A Dupuis	1	2
5	(Thailand) **P Srichaphan**	**6**	**6**
3	(Russia) **Y Kafelnikov**	6^{6}	**7^{7}**	**7^{8}**
(Germany) A Waske	**7^{8}**	6^{5}	6^{6}
(Denmark) **K Carlsen**	**5**
(Germany) N Kiefer	2	r
(Israel) N Okun	2	**6**	5
WC	(Uzbekistan) **V Kutsenko**	**6**	3	**7**
(Netherlands) M Verkerk	4	1
6	(Croatia) **I Ljubičić**	**6**	**6**
8	(Italy) **D Sanguinetti**	4	**6**	**7^{7}**
WC	(Sweden) M Norman	**6**	4	6^{2}
(Russia) **A Stoliarov**	2	**7^{7}**	**6**
Q	(Finland) T Ketola	**6**	6^{2}	2
(Germany) **L Burgsmüller**	4	**6**	**6**
Q	(Russia) K Ivanov-Smolensky	**6**	0	2
(Denmark) **K Pless**	**7^{7}**	**6**
4	(Germany) R Schüttler	6^{4}	2
7	(Russia) **M Youzhny**	**7^{7}**	**6**
(Spain) F López	6^{5}	4
(Uzbekistan) O Ogorodov	2	2
Q	(Belarus) **V Voltchkov**	**6**	**6**
(Germany) B Phau	3	6^{3}
(Armenia) **S Sargsian**	**6**	**7^{7}**
WC	(Switzerland) M Rosset	**6**	6^{2}	3
2	(Germany) **T Haas**	4	**7^{7}**	**6**

Second round
1	(Russia) **M Safin**	**7^{7}**	6^{3}	**6**
(Slovakia) K Beck	6^{4}	**7^{7}**	4
(Israel) H Levy	3	4
5	(Thailand) **P Srichaphan**	**6**	**6**
3	(Russia) **Y Kafelnikov**	3	**6**	**6**
(Denmark) K Carlsen	**6**	4	4
WC	(Uzbekistan) V Kutsenko	**7^{7}**	2	6^{4}
6	(Croatia) **I Ljubičić**	6^{2}	**6**	**7^{7}**
8	(Italy) **D Sanguinetti**	**6**	**6**
(Russia) A Stoliarov	3	3
(Germany) L Burgsmüller	4	5
(Denmark) **K Pless**	**6**	**7**
7	(Russia) M Youzhny	1	3
Q	(Belarus) **V Voltchkov**	**6**	**6**
(Armenia) S Sargsian	6^{5}	4
2	(Germany) **T Haas**	**7^{7}**	**6**

Quarterfinals
1	(Russia) M Safin	3	6^{5}
5	(Thailand) **P Srichaphan**	**6**	**7^{7}**
3	(Russia) **Y Kafelnikov**	**6**	**6**
6	(Croatia) I Ljubičić	3	2
8	(Italy) **D Sanguinetti**	4	**7^{7}**	**6**
(Denmark) K Pless	**6**	6^{1}	2
Q	(Belarus) **V Voltchkov**	**6**	**2**
2	(Germany) T Haas	2	1	r

Semifinals
5	(Thailand) P Srichaphan	2	4
3	(Russia) **Y Kafelnikov**	**6**	**6**
8	(Italy) D Sanguinetti	3	2
Q	(Belarus) **V Voltchkov**	**6**	**6**

Final
3	(Russia) **Yevgeny Kafelnikov**	**7^{8}**	**7**
Q	(Belarus) Vladimir Voltchkov	6^{6}	5
