= Ingo Neumüller =

Austrian tennis coach and former professional player

- Country (sports): Austria
- Born: 30 March 1979 (age 45); Wels, Austria
- Height: 6 ft 0 in (183 cm)
- Plays: Right-handed
- Prize money: $22,445

Singles
- Career record: 0–1 (ATP Tour)
- Highest ranking: No. 462 (17 Aug 1998)

Doubles
- Highest ranking: No. 587 (9 Mar 1998)

Ingo Neumüller (born 30 March 1979) is an Austrian tennis coach and former professional player.

Born in Wels, Neumüller turned professional in 1998 and won the 2003 Austrian national championships, which earned him a wildcard to that year's Austrian Open. He lost in the first round of the Austrian Open to Paul-Henri Mathieu in what would be the only ATP Tour main draw appearance of his career.

Neumüller is a former coach of Jürgen Melzer.

== ITF Futures titles ==
=== Doubles: (1) ===
No.	Date	Tournament	Surface	Partner	Opponents	Score
1.	Jul 2003	Austria F3, Seefeld	Clay	(Austria) Thomas Weindorfer	(Czech Republic) Karel Luhan (Czech Republic) Jiri Novy	6–4, 6–3
