= Anthony Ross (tennis) =

Australian tennis player

- Country (sports): Australia
- Born: 19 December 1976 (age 48)
- Prize money: $29,278

Singles
- Highest ranking: No. 1087 (18 October 2004)

Doubles
- Career record: 1–5
- Highest ranking: No. 134 (14 July 2003)

Grand Slam mixed doubles results
- Wimbledon: 1R (2003)

Anthony Ross (born 19 December 1976) is an Australian former professional tennis player.

Ross, a Queensland native, played collegiate tennis for Pepperdine University in Malibu from 1997 to 2000. He earned All-American honours for doubles in 2000 when he and Sebastien Graeff teamed up to make the quarter-finals of the NCAA Division 1 Championships.

During his career on the professional tour, Ross made most progress as a doubles player, reaching a best ranking of 134 in the world. He was an ATP Tour quarter-finalist in the doubles of the 2001 Shanghai Open and won the doubles title at the Bangkok Challenger in 2002. At the 2003 Wimbledon Championships he featured in the main draw of the mixed doubles, as partner of Amanda Augustus.

== Challenger titles ==
=== Doubles: (1) ===
No.	Date	Tournament	Surface	Partner	Opponents	Score
1.	Dec 2002	Bangkok, Thailand	Hard	(Australia) Grant Silcock	(Argentina) Federico Browne (Netherlands) Rogier Wassen	W/O
