= 2002 Monte Carlo Masters =

- Date: 15–21 April
- Edition: 96th
- Category: ATP Masters Series
- Draw: 64S / 32D
- Prize money: $2,328,000
- Surface: Clay / outdoor
- Location: Roquebrune-Cap-Martin, France
- Venue: Monte Carlo Country Club

Champions

Singles
- (Spain) Juan Carlos Ferrero

Doubles
- (Sweden) Jonas Björkman / (Australia) Todd Woodbridge
← 2001 ·	Monte Carlo Masters	· 2003 →

The 2002 Monte Carlo Masters was a men's tennis tournament played on outdoor clay courts. It was the 96th edition of the Monte Carlo Masters and was part of the Tennis Masters Series of the 2002 ATP Tour. It took place at the Monte Carlo Country Club in Roquebrune-Cap-Martin in France from 15 April through 21 April 2002.

The men's field was headlined by world No. 1 Lleyton Hewitt, Juan Carlos Ferrero and Yevgeny Kafelnikov. Other top seeds were Tim Henman, Tommy Haas, Marat Safin, Sébastien Grosjean and Thomas Johansson.

== Finals ==
=== Singles ===
(Spain) Juan Carlos Ferrero defeated (Spain) Carlos Moyá 7–5, 6–3, 6–4

- It was Ferrero's 1st title of the year and the 6th of his career. It was his 1st Masters title of the year and his 2nd overall.

=== Doubles ===
(Sweden) Jonas Björkman / (Australia) Todd Woodbridge defeated (Netherlands) Paul Haarhuis / (Russia) Yevgeny Kafelnikov 6–3, 3–6, [10–7]

- It was Björkman's 2nd title of the year and the 31st of his career. It was Woodbridge's 2nd title of the year and the 74th of his career.
