= 2002 Generali Open – Singles =

Singles
- 2002 Generali Open

Final
- Champion: (Spain) Àlex Corretja
- Runner-up: (Spain) Juan Carlos Ferrero
- Score: 6–4, 6–1, 6–3

Details
- Draw: 48
- Seeds: 16

Events
Singles	Doubles
- Generali Open

Nicolás Lapentti was the defending champion but lost in the third round to Mariano Zabaleta.

Àlex Corretja won in the final 6–4, 6–1, 6–3 against Juan Carlos Ferrero.

== Seeds ==
A champion seed is indicated in bold text while text in italics indicates the round in which that seed was eliminated. All sixteen seeds received a bye to the second round.

1. (Spain) Albert Costa (quarterfinals)
2. (Spain) Juan Carlos Ferrero (final)
3. (Argentina) Guillermo Cañas (second round)
4. (Romania) Andrei Pavel (quarterfinals)
5. (Ecuador) Nicolás Lapentti (third round)
6. (Argentina) Gastón Gaudio (semifinals)
7. (Germany) Rainer Schüttler (second round)
8. (Spain) **Àlex Corretja (champion)**
9. (Chile) Marcelo Ríos (second round)
10. (Argentina) Juan Ignacio Chela (quarterfinals)
11. (Austria) Stefan Koubek (third round)
12. (Argentina) Mariano Zabaleta (semifinals)
13. (Argentina) Agustín Calleri (second round)
14. (Morocco) Hicham Arazi (second round)
15. (France) Julien Boutter (second round)
16. (Spain) Félix Mantilla (second round)

== Draw ==
Key

- Q = Qualifier
- WC = Wild card
- LL = Lucky loser
- Alt = Alternate
- ITF = ITF entry
- PR = Protected ranking
- SR = Special ranking
- SE = Special exempt
- JE = Junior exempt
- JR = Junior Accelerator Programme entrant
- CO = College Accelerator Programme entrant
- NG = Next Gen Accelerator Program entrant
- w/o = Walkover
- r = Retired
- d = Defaulted

=== Finals ===
Semifinals
8	(Spain) **Àlex Corretja**	**6**	**6**
6	(Argentina) Gastón Gaudio	3	1
12	(Argentina) Mariano Zabaleta	**7^{7}**	5	3
2	(Spain) **Juan Carlos Ferrero**	6^{2}	**7**	**6**

Final
8	(Spain) **Àlex Corretja**	**6**	**6**	**6**
2	(Spain) Juan Carlos Ferrero	4	1	3

=== Top half ===
==== Section 1 ====
First round
(Brazil) F Saretta	5	**6**	3
Q	(Costa Rica) **J A Marín**	**7**	3	**6**
(Germany) **M Kohlmann**	**6**	3	**6**
WC	(Australia) W Arthurs	3	**6**	3
Q	(Monaco) **J-R Lisnard**	**6**	3	**6**
(Germany) L Burgsmüller	4	**6**	3
WC	(Austria) **T Schiessling**	**6**	3	**7**
(Czech Republic) B Ulihrach	2	**6**	5

Second round
1	(Spain) **A Costa**	**6**	**6**
Q	(Costa Rica) J A Marín	1	3
(Germany) **M Kohlmann**	**6**	**6**
16	(Spain) F Mantilla	3	4
9	(Chile) M Ríos	5	4
Q	(Monaco) **J-R Lisnard**	**7**	**6**
WC	(Austria) T Schiessling	3	0
8	(Spain) **À Corretja**	**6**	**6**

Third round
1	(Spain) **A Costa**	**6**	**6**
(Germany) M Kohlmann	1	1
Q	(Monaco) J-R Lisnard	3	2
8	(Spain) **À Corretja**	**6**	**6**

Quarterfinals
1	(Spain) A Costa	1	2
8	(Spain) **À Corretja**	**6**	**6**

==== Section 2 ====
First round
(Chile) **N Massú**	**6**	**6**
(Slovakia) K Kučera	3	3
(Brazil) **A Sá**	3	**6**	**6**
(Austria) J Knowle	**6**	1	3
(France) A Dupuis	**7^{7}**	6^{4}	1
(Romania) **A Voinea**	6^{4}	**7^{7}**	**6**
(France) N Coutelot	0	2
(Italy) **A Gaudenzi**	**6**	**6**

Second round
3	(Argentina) G Cañas	4	**7**	3
(Chile) **N Massú**	**6**	5	**6**
(Brazil) **A Sá**	**7^{7}**	**6**
13	(Argentina) A Calleri	6^{5}	1
11	(Austria) **S Koubek**	**6**	**6**
(Romania) A Voinea	2	3
(Italy) A Gaudenzi	3	4
6	(Argentina) **G Gaudio**	**6**	**6**

Third round
(Chile) **N Massú**	**6**	**6**
(Brazil) A Sá	4	3
11	(Austria) S Koubek	**6**	1	0
6	(Argentina) **G Gaudio**	3	**6**	**6**

Quarterfinals
(Chile) N Massú	4	3
6	(Argentina) **G Gaudio**	**6**	**6**

=== Bottom half ===
==== Section 3 ====
First round
WC	(Austria) H Wiltschnig	1	1
Q	(Italy) **R Furlan**	**6**	**6**
Q	(Austria) O Marach	**6**	4	0
(Spain) **A Martín**	2	**6**	**6**
(Spain) F Vicente	2	5
(Austria) **M Hipfl**	**6**	**7**
(Brazil) **F Meligeni**	**6**	**6**
(Brazil) A Simoni	1	1

Second round
5	(Ecuador) **N Lapentti**	6^{3}	**6**	**6**
Q	(Italy) R Furlan	**7^{7}**	2	4
(Spain) A Martín	**7^{7}**	3	4
12	(Argentina) **M Zabaleta**	6^{3}	**6**	**6**
15	(France) J Boutter	6^{5}	2
(Austria) **M Hipfl**	**7^{7}**	**6**
(Brazil) F Meligeni	4	2
4	(Romania) **A Pavel**	**6**	**6**

Third round
5	(Ecuador) N Lapentti	4	2
12	(Argentina) **M Zabaleta**	**6**	**6**
(Austria) M Hipfl	3	0
4	(Romania) **A Pavel**	**6**	**6**

Quarterfinals
12	(Argentina) **M Zabaleta**	**6**	5	**6**
4	(Romania) A Pavel	4	**7**	2

==== Section 4 ====
First round
(Armenia) S Sargsian	6^{5}	3
(Russia) **N Davydenko**	**7^{7}**	**6**
(Argentina) **G Coria**	3	**7**	**6**
Q	(Spain) R Ramírez Hidalgo	**6**	5	1
Q	(Spain) G Blanco	5	**7^{7}**	4
(Netherlands) **M Verkerk**	**7**	6^{4}	**6**
(Georgia (country)) **I Labadze**	**6**	**7**
(Austria) J Melzer	4	5

Second round
7	(Germany) R Schüttler	4	2
(Russia) **N Davydenko**	**6**	**6**
(Argentina) G Coria	**6**	2	6^{2}
10	(Argentina) **J I Chela**	2	**6**	**7^{7}**
WC/14	(Morocco) H Arazi	2	4
(Netherlands) **M Verkerk**	**6**	**6**
(Georgia (country)) I Labadze	4	4
2	(Spain) **J C Ferrero**	**6**	**6**

Third round
(Russia) N Davydenko	0	1
10	(Argentina) **J I Chela**	**6**	**6**
(Netherlands) M Verkerk	5	2
2	(Spain) **J C Ferrero**	**7**	**6**

Quarterfinals
10	(Argentina) J I Chela	5	**7^{7}**	4
2	(Spain) **J C Ferrero**	**7**	6^{5}	**6**
