= 2003 Monte Carlo Masters =

Men's tennis tournament

- Date: 14–20 April
- Edition: 97th
- Category: ATP Masters Series
- Draw: 64S / 24D
- Prize money: $2,220,000
- Surface: Clay / outdoor
- Location: Roquebrune-Cap-Martin, France
- Venue: Monte Carlo Country Club

Champions

Singles
- (Spain) Juan Carlos Ferrero

Doubles
- (India) Mahesh Bhupathi / (Belarus) Max Mirnyi
← 2002 ·	Monte Carlo Masters	· 2004 →

The 2003 Monte Carlo Masters was a men's tennis tournament played on outdoor clay courts. It was the 97th edition of the Monte Carlo Masters and was part of the Tennis Masters Series of the 2003 ATP Tour. It took place at the Monte Carlo Country Club in Roquebrune-Cap-Martin in France from 14 April through 20 April 2003.

The men's field was headlined by Juan Carlos Ferrero, Carlos Moyá and Andy Roddick. Other top seeds in the field were Albert Costa, Jiří Novák, David Nalbandian, Paradorn Srichaphan and Rainer Schüttler.

Rafael Nadal, then 16 years, 315 days old, made his tournament debut in this year, losing to Guillermo Coria in the Round of 16. Additionally, this would be Nadal’s first main draw appearance at a Masters Series tournament, and the site of his first win over a top-10 player. This would be Nadal’s lone defeat until the 2013 Final, winning the next 46 consecutive matches and 48 of his first 49 matches at this tournament.

== Finals ==
=== Singles ===
(Spain) Juan Carlos Ferrero defeated (Argentina) Guillermo Coria 6–2, 6–2

- It was Ferrero's 1st title of the year and the 8th of his career. It was his 1st Masters title of the year and his 8th overall. It was also his 2nd consecutive win at the event.

=== Doubles ===
(India) Mahesh Bhupathi / (Belarus) Max Mirnyi defeated (France) Michaël Llodra / (France) Fabrice Santoro 6–4, 3–6, 7–6 (8–6)

- It was Bhupathi's 2nd title of the year and the 28th of his career. It was Mirnyi's 4th title of the year and the 17th of his career.
