= 2003 Generali Open =

- Date: 21–27 July
- Edition: 48th
- Category: International Series Gold
- Draw: 48S / 16D
- Prize money: $900,000
- Surface: Clay / outdoor
- Location: Kitzbühel, Austria

Champions

Singles
- (Argentina) Guillermo Coria

Doubles
- (Czech Republic) Martin Damm / (Czech Republic) Cyril Suk
- Generali Open

The 2003 Generali Open was a men's tennis tournament played on outdoor clay courts at the Tennis Stadium Kitzbühel in Kitzbühel in Austria and was part of the International Series Gold of the 2003 ATP Tour. It was the 48th edition of the tournament and ran from 21 July until 27 July 2003. Guillermo Coria won the singles title.

== Finals ==
=== Singles ===
(Argentina) Guillermo Coria defeated (Chile) Nicolás Massú 6–1, 6–4, 6–2

- It was Coria's 3rd title of the year and the 4th of his career.

=== Doubles ===
(Czech Republic) Martin Damm / (Czech Republic) Cyril Suk defeated (Austria) Jürgen Melzer / (Austria) Alexander Peya 6–4, 6–4

- It was Damm's 3rd title of the year and the 26th of his career. It was Suk's 3rd title of the year and the 27th of his career.
