= 2003 Monte Carlo Masters – Singles =

Singles
- 2003 Monte Carlo Masters

Final
- Champion: (Spain) Juan Carlos Ferrero
- Runner-up: (Argentina) Guillermo Coria
- Score: 6–2, 6–2

Details
- Draw: 64 (8 Q / 4 WC )
- Seeds: 16

Events
Singles	Doubles
- Monte Carlo Masters

Defending champion Juan Carlos Ferrero defeated Guillermo Coria in the final, 6–2, 6–2 to win the singles tennis title at the 2003 Monte Carlo Masters.

In addition to this being the first Masters Series tournament for Rafael Nadal, it was also a breakthrough tournament for future eleven-time champion Nadal. With his second round victory over reigning French Open champion Albert Costa, ranked at №7 in the world, he would get his first win over a top-10 player, and he also made his Top-100 debut in the ATP rankings, at 16 years, 322 days old. He lost to Coria in the third round, which would remain his sole loss at the tournament until the 2013 Final, winning a record 46 consecutive matches.

== Seeds ==
1. (Spain) Juan Carlos Ferrero (champion)
2. (Spain) Carlos Moyá (semifinals)
3. (United States) Andy Roddick (first round)
4. (Spain) Albert Costa (second round)
5. (Czech Republic) Jiří Novák (second round)
6. (Argentina) David Nalbandian (second round)
7. (Thailand) Paradorn Srichaphan (second round)
8. (Germany) Rainer Schüttler (second round)
9. (Netherlands) Sjeng Schalken (third round)
10. (Brazil) Gustavo Kuerten (second round)
11. (Morocco) Younes El Aynaoui (first round)
12. (Spain) Àlex Corretja (first round)
13. (Argentina) Gastón Gaudio (third round)
14. (Chile) Fernando González (first round)
15. (United States) James Blake (second round)
16. (Spain) Tommy Robredo (third round)

== Draw ==
Key

- Q = Qualifier
- WC = Wild card
- LL = Lucky loser
- Alt = Alternate
- ITF = ITF entry
- PR = Protected ranking
- SR = Special ranking
- SE = Special exempt
- JE = Junior exempt
- JR = Junior Accelerator Programme entrant
- CO = College Accelerator Programme entrant
- NG = Next Gen Accelerator Program entrant
- w/o = Walkover
- r = Retired
- d = Defaulted

=== Finals ===
Quarterfinals
1	(Spain) Juan Carlos Ferrero	6	6
Q	(Spain) Alberto Martín	0	2
(United States) Vince Spadea	6	6
Q	(Italy) Filippo Volandri	1	3
(Argentina) Juan Ignacio Chela	1	1
(Argentina) Guillermo Coria	6	6
WC	(France) Julien Boutter	6^{4}	2
2	(Spain) Carlos Moyá	7^{7}	6

Semifinals
1	(Spain) Juan Carlos Ferrero	6	6
(United States) Vince Spadea	3	4
(Argentina) Guillermo Coria	7^{7}	6
2	(Spain) Carlos Moyá	6^{3}	2

Final
1	(Spain) Juan Carlos Ferrero	6	6
(Argentina) Guillermo Coria	2	2

=== Top half ===
==== Section 1 ====
First round
1	(Spain) JC Ferrero	6	6
(Australia) W Arthurs	4	1
(Spain) F Mantilla	6	7
Q	(Armenia) S Sargsian	0	5
Q	(Peru) L Horna	6	6
(France) P-H Mathieu	4	4
(Spain) D Ferrer	5	2
13	(Argentina) G Gaudio	7	6
12	(Spain) À Corretja	6^{4}	3
(Spain) F López	7^{7}	6
(Spain) F Vicente	6	6
(France) N Escudé	4	3
Q	(Spain) A Martín	6	3	6
(Belgium) O Rochus	3	6	2
(France) F Santoro	1	2
8	(Germany) R Schüttler	6	6

Second round
1	(Spain) JC Ferrero	3	6	7
(Spain) F Mantilla	6	2	5
Q	(Peru) L Horna	4	1
13	(Argentina) G Gaudio	6	6
(Spain) F López	6^{6}	1
(Spain) F Vicente	7^{8}	6
Q	(Spain) A Martín	6	6
8	(Germany) R Schüttler	2	4

Third round
1	(Spain) JC Ferrero	3	7	6
13	(Argentina) G Gaudio	6	5	2
(Spain) F Vicente	4	6^{5}
Q	(Spain) A Martín	6	7^{7}

Quarterfinals
1	(Spain) JC Ferrero	6	6
Q	(Spain) A Martín	0	2

==== Section 2 ====
First round
3	(United States) A Roddick	6^{5}	3
Q	(Spain) A Portas	7^{7}	6
(Argentina) M Zabaleta	3	6^{8}
(Croatia) I Ljubičić	6	7^{10}
(United States) V Spadea	6	6
(Russia) M Youzhny	1	2
(France) A Clément	6	6
14	(Chile) F González	4	3
10	(Brazil) G Kuerten	3	6	6
(United States) M Fish	6	1	0
(Ecuador) N Lapentti	3	3
WC	(Sweden) M Norman	6	6
(Czech Republic) R Štěpánek	4	3
Q	(Italy) F Volandri	6	6
WC	(France) R Gasquet	4	0
6	(Argentina) D Nalbandian	6	6

Second round
Q	(Spain) A Portas	4	3
(Croatia) I Ljubičić	6	6
(United States) V Spadea	6^{4}	6	6
(France) A Clément	7^{7}	1	2
10	(Brazil) G Kuerten	6	5	2
WC	(Sweden) M Norman	1	7	6
Q	(Italy) F Volandri	6	7^{8}
6	(Argentina) D Nalbandian	2	6^{6}

Third round
(Croatia) I Ljubičić	6	4	6^{8}
(United States) V Spadea	1	6	7^{10}
WC	(Sweden) M Norman	5	3
Q	(Italy) F Volandri	7	6

Quarterfinals
(United States) V Spadea	6	6
Q	(Italy) F Volandri	1	3

=== Bottom half ===
==== Section 3 ====
First round
5	(Czech Republic) J Novák	6	6
(Austria) S Koubek	4	4
(Argentina) J I Chela	6	6
(Argentina) A Calleri	4	1
(United States) T Dent	6^{3}	2
(Finland) J Nieminen	7^{7}	6
(Russia) Y Kafelnikov	6	6^{4}	6
11	(Morocco) Y El Aynaoui	2	7^{7}	1
15	(United States) J Blake	6	3	6
(Slovakia) D Hrbatý	3	6	2
(Argentina) G Coria	6	6
(Argentina) J Acasuso	2	2
(Slovakia) K Kučera	1	2
Q	(Spain) R Nadal	6	6
(Russia) N Davydenko	2	2
4	(Spain) A Costa	6	6

Second round
5	(Czech Republic) J Novák	4	2
(Argentina) J I Chela	6	6
(Finland) J Nieminen	3	6	6
(Russia) Y Kafelnikov	6	2	2
15	(United States) J Blake	0	7^{7}	3
(Argentina) G Coria	6	6^{3}	6
Q	(Spain) R Nadal	7	6
4	(Spain) A Costa	5	3

Third round
(Argentina) J I Chela	6	6
(Finland) J Nieminen	1	1
(Argentina) G Coria	7^{7}	6
Q	(Spain) R Nadal	6^{3}	2

Quarterfinals
(Argentina) J I Chela	1	1
(Argentina) G Coria	6	6

==== Section 4 ====
First round
7	(Thailand) P Srichaphan	7	3	7^{7}
Q	(Australia) P Luczak	5	6	6^{4}
(Belarus) M Mirnyi	6^{6}	6	3
WC	(France) J Boutter	7^{8}	3	6
(South Korea) H-T Lee	6	6
(Spain) D Sanchez	1	3
(Italy) D Sanguinetti	4	1^{r}
9	(Netherlands) S Schalken	6	3
16	(Spain) T Robredo	3	6	6
(Netherlands) M Verkerk	6	3	4
(Netherlands) R Sluiter	6	1	6^{1}
Q	(France) J Benneteau	3	6	7^{7}
(South Africa) W Ferreira	6	2	7
WC	(Sweden) J Björkman	4	6	5
(Belgium) X Malisse	3	3
2	(Spain) C Moyá	6	6

Second round
7	(Thailand) P Srichaphan	4	6	4
WC	(France) J Boutter	6	4	6
(South Korea) H-T Lee	5	2
9	(Netherlands) S Schalken	7	6
16	(Spain) T Robredo	6	6
Q	(France) J Benneteau	2	2
(South Africa) W Ferreira	4	4
2	(Spain) C Moyá	6	6

Third round
WC	(France) J Boutter	7^{7}	6
9	(Netherlands) S Schalken	6^{3}	4
16	(Spain) T Robredo	2	4
2	(Spain) C Moyá	6	6

Quarterfinals
WC	(France) J Boutter	6^{4}	2
2	(Spain) C Moyá	7^{7}	6
