= Robbie Koenig =

South African tennis player

- Country (sports): South Africa
- Residence: Durban, South Africa
- Born: 5 July 1971 (age 54) Durban, South Africa
- Height: 5 ft 8 in (173 cm)
- Turned pro: 1992
- Retired: 2005
- Plays: Right-handed (one-handed backhand)
- Prize money: US$944,191

Singles
- Career record: 3–11
- Career titles: 0; 0 Challenger, 0 Futures
- Highest ranking: No. 262 (9 November 1992)

Grand Slam singles results
- French Open: Q1 (1996, 1997)
- Wimbledon: Q3 (1992)
- US Open: Q1 (1992, 1996, 1997)

Doubles
- Career record: 176–210
- Career titles: 5; 3 Challenger, 0 Futures
- Highest ranking: No. 28 (19 May 2003)

Grand Slam doubles results
- Australian Open: 3R (1998, 2004)
- French Open: 2R (1998, 2001, 2003, 2004, 2005)
- Wimbledon: 3R (1998, 1999)
- US Open: SF (1998)

Grand Slam mixed doubles results
- Australian Open: SF (2001)
- French Open: 1R (1998, 1999, 2003)
- Wimbledon: SF (2001)
- US Open: SF (2002)
- Last updated on: 29 January 2022.

Robert Louis Koenig (/ˈkoʊnɪɡ/ KOH-nig; born 5 July 1971) is a tennis commentator and analyst and a former professional tennis player from South Africa. He won five doubles titles and reached the semifinals of the 1998 US Open men's doubles competition. Koenig works as a tennis broadcaster for a host of TV channels around the world, covering most notably the ATP Masters 1000 events, the Australian Open, French Open, US Open and Wimbledon as well as the premier online tennis channel of TennisTV.com. He has been part of some of the most epic Grand Slam finals in the last 18yrs, most notably, the 2025 French Open final between Jannik Sinner and Carlos Alcaraz.

== Playing career ==
Koenig achieved a career-high singles ranking of World No. 262, notably reaching the third round of Washington in 1992. He had wins early on in his singles career over the likes of Tim Henman, Pat Rafter, Yevgeny Kafelnikov and Felix Mantilla. Most of his success, however, came in doubles. He won 5 titles (with 6 further finals), reaching a career-high doubles ranking of World No. 28 in May 2003. As well as his US Open doubles semi-finals appearance in 1998, Koenig reached the round-of-16 twice at Wimbledon in 1998 and 1999. He was also a quarter-finalist on 3 other occasions at the US Open in 1997, 2001 and 2004. In Mixed Doubles he reached the semi-finals of the Australian Open and Wimbledon in 2001 and the US Open in 2002. He also represented South Africa in Davis Cup on four occasions and was captained by 1985 Wimbledon finalist, Kevin Curren.

== Commentating career ==
Koenig is known for his commentary on the ATP World Tour at their Masters 1000 events matches broadcast on Tennis Channel as well as the online tennis broadcast site TennisTV, often as part of a commentating duo alongside Jason Goodall. Often regarded as “the voice of tennis”, he is a regular in both the Australian Open, Roland Garros and the US Open. He can also be heard on Amazon Prime UK, Fox Sports in Australia, Star Sports in Asia, ESPN International as well as SuperSport in South Africa where he co-hosts during the Grand Slam events. He started commentating in 2007 for ATP Media. Koenig co-hosted and commentated on ‘The Match in Africa’ where Roger Federer and Rafa Nadal played in front of the biggest live tennis audience ever at the time. Netflix used a good deal of his commentary for their “Break Point” docu-series. Rolex has also used his commentary in their adverts for Alcaraz and Sinner in 2025.

== ATP career finals ==
=== Doubles: 11 (5 titles, 6 runner-ups) ===
| Legend Grand Slam Tournaments (0–0) ATP World Tour Finals (0–0) ATP Masters Series (0–0) ATP Championship Series (1–1) ATP World Series (4–5) | Finals by surface Hard (4–4) Clay (1–2) Grass (0–0) Carpet (0–0) | Finals by setting Outdoors (5–5) Indoors (0–1) |

| Result | W–L | Date | Tournament | Tier | Surface | Partner | Opponents | Score |
|---|---|---|---|---|---|---|---|---|
| Loss | 0–1 | May 1999 | St. Pölten, Austria | International Series | Clay | (South Africa) Brent Haygarth | (Australia) Andrew Florent (Russia) Andrei Olhovskiy | 7–5, 4–6, 5–7 |
| Loss | 0–2 | Feb 2000 | Dubai, United Arab Emirates | International Series | Hard | (Australia) Peter Tramacchi | (Czech Republic) Jiří Novák (Czech Republic) David Rikl | 2–6, 5–7 |
| Loss | 0–3 | Sep 2000 | Tashkent, Uzbekistan | International Series | Hard | (South Africa) Marius Barnard | (United States) Justin Gimelstob (United States) Scott Humphries | 3–6, 2–6 |
| Loss | 0–4 | Sep 2001 | Shanghai, China | International Series | Hard | (South Africa) John-Laffnie de Jager | (Zimbabwe) Byron Black (Japan) Thomas Shimada | 2–6, 6–3, 5–7 |
| Loss | 0–5 | Feb 2002 | San Jose, United States | International Series | Hard | (South Africa) John-Laffnie de Jager | (Zimbabwe) Wayne Black (Zimbabwe) Kevin Ullyett | 3–6, 6–4, [5–10] |
| Win | 1–5 | Jul 2002 | Kitzbühel, Austria | Championship Series | Clay | (Japan) Thomas Shimada | (Argentina) Lucas Arnold Ker (Spain) Álex Corretja | 7–6^{(7–3)}, 6–4 |
| Win | 2–5 | Sep 2002 | Tashkent, Uzbekistan | International Series | Hard | (South Africa) David Adams | (Netherlands) Raemon Sluiter (Netherlands) Martin Verkerk | 6–2, 7–5 |
| Win | 3–5 | Jan 2003 | Auckland, New Zealand | International Series | Hard | (South Africa) David Adams | (Czech Republic) Tomáš Cibulec (Czech Republic) Leoš Friedl | 7–6^{(7–5)}, 3–6, 6–3 |
| Loss | 3–6 | Apr 2003 | Barcelona, Spain | Championship Series | Clay | (South Africa) Chris Haggard | (United States) Bob Bryan (United States) Mike Bryan | 4–6, 3–6 |
| Win | 4–6 | Aug 2003 | Long Island, United States | International Series | Hard | (Argentina) Martín Rodríguez | (Czech Republic) Martin Damm (Czech Republic) Cyril Suk | 6–3, 7–6^{(7–4)} |
| Win | 5–6 | Aug 2004 | Washington, United States | International Series | Hard | (South Africa) Chris Haggard | (United States) Travis Parrott (Russia) Dmitry Tursunov | 7–6^{(7–3)}, 6–1 |

== ATP Challenger and ITF Futures finals ==
=== Doubles: 5 (3–2) ===
| Legend ATP Challenger (3–2) ITF Futures (0–0) | Finals by surface Hard (3–1) Clay (0–0) Grass (0–0) Carpet (0–1) |

| Result | W–L | Date | Tournament | Tier | Surface | Partner | Opponents | Score |
|---|---|---|---|---|---|---|---|---|
| Loss | 0–1 | Oct 1992 | Dublin, Ireland | Challenger | Carpet | (Sweden) Douglas Geiwald | (Netherlands) Sander Groen (Germany) Arne Thoms | 7–5, 4–6, 3–6 |
| Win | 1–1 | Nov 1996 | Aachen, Germany | Challenger | Hard | (Uzbekistan) Oleg Ogorodov | (United States) Dave Randall (United States) Chris Woodruff | 6–4, 3–6, 6–3 |
| Win | 2–1 | Oct 1997 | Sedona, United States | Challenger | Hard | (South Africa) John-Laffnie De Jager | (United States) Eric Taino (United States) Adam Peterson | 6–2, 6–2 |
| Loss | 2–2 | Oct 1997 | Brest, France | Challenger | Hard | (South Africa) John-Laffnie De Jager | (United States) Dave Randall (United States) Jack Waite | 6–3, 6–7, 4–6 |
| Win | 3–2 | Aug 2001 | Lexington, United States | Challenger | Hard | (South Africa) John-Laffnie De Jager | (Australia) Paul Kilderry (United States) Jack Waite | 7–6^{(7–1)}, 7–5 |

== Performance timelines ==
Key
| W | F | SF | QF | #R | RR | Q# | DNQ | A | NH |

(W) winner; (F) finalist; (SF) semifinalist; (QF) quarterfinalist; (#R) rounds 4, 3, 2, 1; (RR) round-robin stage; (Q#) qualification round; (DNQ) did not qualify; (A) absent; (NH) not held; (SR) strike rate (events won / competed); (W–L) win–loss record.

=== Singles ===
| Tournament | 1992 | 1993 | 1994 | 1995 | 1996 | 1997 | SR | W–L | Win % |
|---|---|---|---|---|---|---|---|---|---|
Grand Slam tournaments
| Australian Open | A | A | A | A | A | A | 0 / 0 | 0–0 | – |
| French Open | A | A | A | A | Q1 | Q1 | 0 / 0 | 0–0 | – |
| Wimbledon | Q3 | Q1 | A | A | A | Q2 | 0 / 0 | 0–0 | – |
| US Open | Q1 | A | A | A | Q1 | Q1 | 0 / 0 | 0–0 | – |
| Win–loss | 0–0 | 0–0 | 0–0 | 0–0 | 0–0 | 0–0 | 0 / 0 | 0–0 | – |
ATP Masters Series
| Miami | A | Q2 | A | A | 1R | A | 0 / 1 | 0–1 | 0% |
| Canada | A | A | A | A | Q1 | A | 0 / 0 | 0–0 | – |
| Cincinnati | 1R | A | Q1 | A | Q3 | Q1 | 0 / 1 | 0–1 | 0% |
| Win–loss | 0–1 | 0–0 | 0–0 | 0–0 | 0–1 | 0–0 | 0 / 2 | 0–2 | 0% |

=== Doubles ===
| Tournament | 1992 | 1993 | 1994 | 1995 | 1996 | 1997 | 1998 | 1999 | 2000 | 2001 | 2002 | 2003 | 2004 | 2005 | SR | W–L | Win % |
|---|---|---|---|---|---|---|---|---|---|---|---|---|---|---|---|---|---|
Grand Slam tournaments
| Australian Open | A | A | A | A | A | A | 3R | A | 2R | 1R | 1R | 2R | 3R | 2R | 0 / 7 | 7–7 | 50% |
| French Open | A | A | A | A | A | A | 2R | 1R | A | 2R | 1R | 2R | 2R | 2R | 0 / 7 | 5–7 | 42% |
| Wimbledon | Q2 | Q1 | A | A | A | 1R | 3R | 3R | 2R | 1R | 2R | 1R | 1R | 1R | 0 / 9 | 6–9 | 40% |
| US Open | A | A | A | A | A | QF | SF | 1R | 3R | QF | 3R | 2R | QF | 3R | 0 / 9 | 20–9 | 69% |
| Win–loss | 0–0 | 0–0 | 0–0 | 0–0 | 0–0 | 3–2 | 9–4 | 2–3 | 4–3 | 4–4 | 3–4 | 3–4 | 6–4 | 4–4 | 0 / 32 | 38–32 | 54% |
ATP Tour Masters 1000
| Indian Wells | A | A | A | A | A | A | 1R | 2R | 2R | A | A | 1R | 1R | A | 0 / 5 | 2–5 | 29% |
| Miami | A | A | A | A | A | Q1 | 1R | 1R | 1R | 1R | 2R | 1R | 2R | A | 0 / 7 | 2–7 | 22% |
| Monte Carlo | A | A | A | A | A | A | A | 1R | 1R | 1R | 2R | 2R | 2R | A | 0 / 6 | 3–6 | 33% |
| Hamburg | A | A | A | A | A | A | 2R | 1R | 1R | Q2 | 1R | 1R | A | A | 0 / 5 | 1–5 | 17% |
| Rome | A | A | A | A | A | A | Q1 | 2R | 1R | A | 1R | 2R | A | A | 0 / 4 | 2–4 | 33% |
| Canada | A | A | A | A | A | A | 1R | QF | 2R | A | 1R | A | A | A | 0 / 4 | 3–4 | 43% |
| Cincinnati | A | A | A | A | Q2 | A | 2R | QF | 1R | A | 1R | 1R | A | A | 0 / 5 | 3–5 | 38% |
| Paris | A | A | A | A | A | A | 1R | A | 1R | A | 2R | A | A | A | 0 / 3 | 1–3 | 25% |
| Madrid | Not Held | | | | | | | | | | 1R | A | A | A | 0 / 1 | 0–1 | 0% |
| Stuttgart | A | A | A | A | A | A | 2R | A | Q1 | A | A | A | A | A | 0 / 1 | 1–1 | 50% |
| Win–loss | 0–0 | 0–0 | 0–0 | 0–0 | 0–0 | 0–0 | 3–7 | 6–7 | 2–8 | 0–2 | 3–8 | 2–6 | 2–3 | 0–0 | 0 / 41 | 18–41 | 31% |

=== Mixed doubles ===
| Tournament | 1998 | 1999 | 2000 | 2001 | 2002 | 2003 | 2004 | 2005 | SR | W–L | Win % |
|---|---|---|---|---|---|---|---|---|---|---|---|
Grand Slam tournaments
| Australian Open | A | A | 2R | SF | A | QF | 1R | A | 0 / 4 | 6–4 | 60% |
| French Open | 1R | 1R | A | A | A | 1R | A | A | 0 / 3 | 0–3 | 0% |
| Wimbledon | 3R | 1R | 1R | 1R | SF | 3R | 3R | 1R | 0 / 8 | 10–8 | 56% |
| US Open | 1R | 2R | A | A | SF | A | A | A | 0 / 3 | 4–3 | 57% |
| Win–loss | 2–3 | 1–3 | 1–2 | 3–2 | 7–2 | 4–3 | 2–2 | 0–1 | 0 / 18 | 20–18 | 53% |
