= Thomas Shimada =

American tennis player

- Country (sports): Japan
- Born: February 10, 1975 (age 51) Philadelphia, United States
- Height: 5 ft 10 in (178 cm)
- Plays: Right-handed
- Prize money: $433,946

Singles
- Career record: 0–5
- Highest ranking: No. 477 (November 3, 1997)

Doubles
- Career record: 88–126
- Career titles: 3
- Highest ranking: No. 40 (September 24, 2001)

Grand Slam doubles results
- Australian Open: 2R (2000, 2001)
- French Open: 2R (2000)
- Wimbledon: 2R (2000, 2001)
- US Open: 2R (2001)

Grand Slam mixed doubles results
- Australian Open: 2R (2003)
- Wimbledon: 3R (2002)
- US Open: 1R (2002)

Thomas Shimada (born February 10, 1975) is a retired professional tennis player who represented Japan. He turned professional in 1993.

Shimada primarily played doubles. Shimada has achieved a career-high singles ranking relevant as of March 23, 2007, of world No. 477 which he reached on November 3, 1997. Also relevant of March 23, 2007, Shimada reached his career-high doubles ranking on September 24, 2001, when he became world No. 40.

== Career finals ==
=== Doubles: 6 (3–3) ===
Result	W–L	Date	Tournament	Surface	Partner	Opponents	Score
Loss	0–1	Nov 2000	St. Petersburg, Russia	Hard (i)	(South Africa) Myles Wakefield	(Canada) Daniel Nestor (Zimbabwe) Kevin Ullyett	6–7^{(5–7)}, 5–7
Loss	0–2	Mar 2001	Delray Beach, US	Hard	(South Africa) Myles Wakefield	(United States) Jan-Michael Gambill (United States) Andy Roddick	3–6, 4–6
Win	1–2	Sep 2001	Shanghai, China	Hard	(Zimbabwe) Byron Black	(South Africa) John-Laffnie de Jager (South Africa) Robbie Koenig	6–2, 3–6, 7–5
Win	2–2	Jul 2002	Kitzbühel, Austria	Clay	(South Africa) Robbie Koenig	(Argentina) Lucas Arnold Ker (Spain) Àlex Corretja	7–6^{(7–3)}, 6–4
Loss	2–3	Jul 2003	Umag, Croatia	Clay	(Australia) Todd Perry	(Spain) Álex López Morón (Spain) Rafael Nadal	1–6, 3–6
Win	3–3	Sep 2003	Costa do Sauipe, Brazil	Hard	(Australia) Todd Perry	(United States) Scott Humphries (The Bahamas) Mark Merklein	6–2, 6–4
