= Tomáš Berdych career statistics =

Career finals
Discipline	Type	Won	Lost	Total
Singles	Grand Slam	–	1	1
Singles	ATP Finals	–	–	–
Singles	ATP 1000	1	3	4
Singles	ATP 500	3	4	7
Singles	ATP 250	9	11	20
Singles	Olympic Games	–	–	–
Singles	Total	13	19	32
Doubles	Grand Slam	–	–	–
Doubles	ATP Finals	–	–	–
Doubles	ATP 1000	–	–	–
Doubles	ATP 500	1	1	2
Doubles	ATP 250	1	–	1
Doubles	Olympic Games	–	–	–
Doubles	Total	2	1	3

This is a list of the main career statistics of Czech professional tennis player Tomáš Berdych.

== Performance timelines ==
Key
W	F	SF	QF	#R	RR	Q#	P#	DNQ	A	Z#	PO	G	S	B	NMS	NTI	P	NH

(W) winner; (F) finalist; (SF) semifinalist; (QF) quarterfinalist; (#R) rounds 4, 3, 2, 1; (RR) round-robin stage; (Q#) qualification round; (P#) preliminary round; (DNQ) did not qualify; (A) absent; (Z#) Davis/Fed Cup Zonal Group (with number indication) or (PO) play-off; (G) gold, (S) silver or (B) bronze Olympic/Paralympic medal; (NMS) not a Masters tournament; (NTI) not a Tier I tournament; (P) postponed; (NH) not held; (SR) strike rate (events won / competed); (W–L) win–loss record.

=== Singles ===
Tournament	2002	2003	2004	2005	2006	2007	2008	2009	2010	2011	2012	2013	2014	2015	2016	2017	2018	2019	SR	W–L	Win %
Grand Slam tournaments
Australian Open	A	A	2R	1R	2R	4R	4R	4R	2R	QF	QF	QF	SF	SF	QF	3R	QF	4R	0 / 16	47–16	75%
French Open	A	A	1R	2R	4R	1R	2R	1R	SF	1R	4R	1R	QF	4R	QF	2R	1R	A	0 / 15	25–15	62%
Wimbledon	A	A	1R	3R	4R	QF	3R	4R	F	4R	1R	QF	3R	4R	SF	SF	A	1R	0 / 15	42–15	74%
US Open	A	2R	4R	3R	4R	4R	1R	3R	1R	3R	SF	4R	QF	4R	A	2R	A	1R	0 / 15	32–15	68%
Win–Loss	0–0	1–1	4–4	5–4	10–4	10–4	6–4	8–4	12–4	9–4	12–4	11–4	15–4	14–4	13–3	9–4	4–2	3–3	0 / 61	146–61	71%
Year-end championships
Tour Finals	Did Not Qualify								RR	SF	RR	RR	RR	RR	Did Not Qualify				0 / 6	6–13	32%
National representation
Summer Olympics	Not Held		QF	Not Held			3R	Not Held			1R	Not Held			A	Not Held			0 / 3	5–3	63%
Davis Cup	A	1R	1R	1R	PO	1R	QF	F	SF	1R	W	W	SF	A	QF	A	A	A	2 / 14	29–15	66%
ATP Masters 1000 tournaments
Indian Wells Open	A	A	A	3R	4R	2R	2R	2R	QF	4R	4R	SF	2R	QF	4R	3R	3R	1R	0 / 15	22–15	59%
Miami Open	A	A	A	1R	3R	3R	SF	4R	F	QF	3R	QF	SF (Note: Withdrew during the tournament. Not counted as a loss.)	SF	QF	QF	3R	A	0 / 14	34–13	72%
Monte-Carlo Masters	A	A	1R	2R	2R	SF	A	1R	3R	3R	SF	3R	3R	F	2R	3R	1R	A	0 / 14	20–14	59%
Madrid Open (Note: Held as Hamburg Masters until 2008, Madrid Masters (clay) 2009–present.)	A	A	A	2R	1R	2R	2R	2R	A	QF	F	SF	QF	SF	QF	3R	1R	A	0 / 13	21–13	62%
Italian Open	A	A	Q1	1R	3R	QF	A	1R	2R	QF	QF	SF	3R	QF	3R	3R	1R	A	0 / 13	19–13	59%
Canadian Open	A	A	A	2R	QF	1R	2R	1R	QF	QF	3R	3R	3R	2R	QF	A	A	A	0 / 12	14–12	54%
Cincinnati Open	A	A	A	2R	1R	3R	2R	QF	3R	SF	3R	SF	2R	QF	3R	1R	A	A	0 / 13	18–13	58%
Shanghai Masters (Note: Held as Madrid Masters (hardcourt) until 2008, and Shanghai Masters 2009–present.)	A	A	1R	1R	SF	2R	2R	3R	3R	3R	SF	3R	QF	QF	2R	A	A	A	0 / 8	16–13	55%
Paris Masters	A	A	A	W	QF	3R	3R	2R	3R	SF	QF	QF	SF	QF	QF	A	A	A	1 / 12	27–11	71%
Win–Loss	0–0	0–0	0–2	12–8	14–9	12–9	9–7	9–9	16–8	19–9	19–9	21–9	14–8	22–9	12–9	10–6	2–5	0–1	1 / 118	191–117	62%
Career statistics
	2002	2003	2004	2005	2006	2007	2008	2009	2010	2011	2012	2013	2014	2015	2016	2017	2018	2019	SR	W–L	Win %
Tournaments	0	2	15	27	24	22	20	25	23	23	22	23	23	22	20	18	12	9	Career total: 330		
Finals	0	0	1	1	2	2	2	1	2	1	4	3	5	5	1	1	0	1	Career total: 32		
Titles	0	0	1	1	0	1	1	1	0	1	2	0	2	2	1	0	0	0	Career total: 13		
Hard Win–Loss	0–0	2–2	7–5	12–14	23–14	21–14	25–14	22–17	25–21	37–15	42–15	39–17	40–14	40–16	27–14	17–10	10–5	13–8	9 / 213	401–216	65%
Clay Win–Loss	0–0	0–0	9–7	12–11	14–7	16–8	6–6	9–7	14–4	10–6	18–5	9–6	11–6	12–4	7–4	10–5	0–4	0–0	2 / 81	158–90	64%
Grass Win–Loss	0–0	0–0	0–1	3–3	7–2	8–1	3–2	4–2	6–1	6–2	1–3	6–2	4–2	5–2	5–2	8–3	1–2	0–1	1 / 32	67–31	70%
Carpet Win–Loss	0–0	0–0	0–2	7–1	4–1	1–1	1–0	1–0	Discontinued										1 / 4	14–5	74%
Overall Win–Loss	0–0	2–2	16–15	34–29	48–24	46–24	35–22	36–26	45–26	53–23	61–23	54–25	55–22	57–22	39–20	35–18	11–11	13–9	13 / 330	640–342	65%
Win %	–	50%	52%	54%	67%	66%	61%	58%	63%	70%	73%	68%	71%	72%	66%	66%	50%	59%	65%		
Year-end ranking	398	103	44	24	13	14	20	20	6	7	6	7	7	6	10	19	71	104	$29,491,328		

=== Doubles ===
Tournament	2004	2005	2006	SR	W–L	Win %
Grand Slam tournaments
Australian Open	A	QF	3R	0 / 2	5–2	71%
French Open	1R	2R	1R	0 / 3	1–3	25%
Wimbledon	A	2R	A	0 / 1	1–1	50%
US Open	2R	1R	1R	0 / 3	1–3	25%
Win–Loss	1–2	5–4	2–3	0 / 9	8–9	47%

== Grand Slam tournament finals ==
=== Singles: 1 (runner-up) ===
Result	Year	Tournament	Surface	Opponent	Score
Loss	2010	Wimbledon	Grass	(Spain) Rafael Nadal	3–6, 5–7, 4–6

== Other significant finals ==
=== ATP Masters 1000 tournaments ===
==== Singles: 4 (1 title, 3 runner-ups) ====
Result	Year	Tournament	Surface	Opponent	Score
Win	2005	Paris Masters	Carpet (i)	(Croatia) Ivan Ljubičić	6–3, 6–4, 3–6, 4–6, 6–4
Loss	2010	Miami Open	Hard	(United States) Andy Roddick	5–7, 4–6
Loss	2012	Madrid Open	Clay	(Switzerland) Roger Federer	6–3, 5–7, 5–7
Loss	2015	Monte-Carlo Masters	Clay	(Serbia) Novak Djokovic	5–7, 6–4, 3–6

== ATP Tour finals ==
=== Singles: 32 (13 titles, 19 runner-ups) ===
Legend Grand Slam (0–1) ATP 1000 (1–3) International Gold / ATP 500 (3–4) International / ATP 250 (9–11)	Finals by surface Hard (9–11) Clay (2–6) Grass (1–2) Carpet (1–0)	Finals by setting Outdoor (7–16) Indoor (6–3)

Result	W–L	Date	Tournament	Tier	Surface	Opponent	Score
Win	1–0	Sep 2004	Campionati Internazionali di Sicilia, Italy	International	Clay	(Italy) Filippo Volandri	6–3, 6–3
Loss	1–1	Jul 2005	Swedish Open, Sweden	International	Clay	(Spain) Rafael Nadal	6–2, 2–6, 4–6
Win	2–1	Oct 2005	Paris Masters, France	ATP 1000	Carpet (i)	(Croatia) Ivan Ljubičić	6–3, 6–4, 3–6, 4–6, 6–4
Loss	2–2	Jun 2006	Halle Open, Germany	International	Grass	(Switzerland) Roger Federer	0–6, 7–6^{(7–4)}, 2–6
Loss	2–3	Oct 2006	Mumbai Open, India	International	Hard	(Russia) Dmitry Tursunov	3–6, 6–4, 6–7^{(5–7)}
Win	3–3	Jun 2007	Halle Open, Germany	International	Grass	(Cyprus) Marcos Baghdatis	7–5, 6–4
Loss	3–4	Jul 2008	Swedish Open, Sweden	International	Clay	(Spain) Tommy Robredo	4–6, 1–6
Win	4–4	Oct 2008	Japan Open, Japan	Intl. Gold	Hard	(Argentina) Juan Martín del Potro	6–1, 6–4
Win	5–4	May 2009	Bavarian Championships, Germany	ATP 250	Clay	(Russia) Mikhail Youzhny	6–4, 4–6, 7–6^{(7–5)}
Loss	5–5	Apr 2010	Miami Open, US	ATP 1000	Hard	(United States) Andy Roddick	5–7, 4–6
Loss	5–6	Jul 2010	Wimbledon Championships, UK	Grand Slam	Grass	(Spain) Rafael Nadal	3–6, 5–7, 4–6
Win	6–6	Oct 2011	China Open, China	ATP 500	Hard	(Croatia) Marin Čilić	3–6, 6–4, 6–1
Win	7–6	Feb 2012	Open Sud de France, France	ATP 250	Hard (i)	(France) Gaël Monfils	6–2, 4–6, 6–3
Loss	7–7	May 2012	Madrid Open, Spain	ATP 1000	Clay	(Switzerland) Roger Federer	6–3, 5–7, 5–7
Loss	7–8	Aug 2012	Winston-Salem Open, US	ATP 250	Hard	(United States) John Isner	6–3, 4–6, 6–7^{(9–11)}
Win	8–8	Oct 2012	Stockholm Open, Sweden	ATP 250	Hard (i)	(France) Jo-Wilfried Tsonga	4–6, 6–4, 6–4
Loss	8–9	Feb 2013	Open 13, France	ATP 250	Hard (i)	(France) Jo-Wilfried Tsonga	6–3, 6–7^{(6–8)}, 4–6
Loss	8–10	Mar 2013	Dubai Tennis Championships, UAE	ATP 500	Hard	(Serbia) Novak Djokovic	5–7, 3–6
Loss	8–11	Sep 2013	Thailand Open, Thailand	ATP 250	Hard (i)	(Canada) Milos Raonic	6–7^{(4–7)}, 3–6
Win	9–11	Feb 2014	Rotterdam Open, Netherlands	ATP 500	Hard (i)	(Croatia) Marin Čilić	6–4, 6–2
Loss	9–12	Mar 2014	Dubai Tennis Championships, UAE	ATP 500	Hard	(Switzerland) Roger Federer	6–3, 4–6, 3–6
Loss	9–13	May 2014	Portugal Open, Portugal	ATP 250	Clay	(Argentina) Carlos Berlocq	6–0, 5–7, 1–6
Loss	9–14	Oct 2014	China Open, China	ATP 500	Hard	(Serbia) Novak Djokovic	0–6, 2–6
Win	10–14	Oct 2014	Stockholm Open, Sweden (2)	ATP 250	Hard (i)	(Bulgaria) Grigor Dimitrov	5–7, 6–4, 6–4
Loss	10–15	Jan 2015	Qatar Open, Qatar	ATP 250	Hard	(Spain) David Ferrer	4–6, 5–7
Loss	10–16	Feb 2015	Rotterdam Open, Netherlands	ATP 500	Hard (i)	(Switzerland) Stan Wawrinka	6–4, 3–6, 4–6
Loss	10–17	Apr 2015	Monte-Carlo Masters, Monaco	ATP 1000	Clay	(Serbia) Novak Djokovic	5–7, 6–4, 3–6
Win	11–17	Oct 2015	Shenzhen Open, China	ATP 250	Hard	(Spain) Guillermo García-López	6–3, 7–6^{(9–7)}
Win	12–17	Oct 2015	Stockholm Open, Sweden (3)	ATP 250	Hard (i)	(United States) Jack Sock	7–6^{(7–1)}, 6–2
Win	13–17	Oct 2016	Shenzhen Open, China (2)	ATP 250	Hard	(France) Richard Gasquet	7–6^{(7–5)}, 6–7^{(2–7)}, 6–3
Loss	13–18	May 2017	Lyon Open, France	ATP 250	Clay	(France) Jo-Wilfried Tsonga	6–7^{(2–7)}, 5–7
Loss	13–19	Jan 2019	Qatar Open, Qatar	ATP 250	Hard	(Spain) Roberto Bautista Agut	4–6, 6–3, 3–6

=== Doubles: 3 (2 titles, 1 runner-up) ===
Legend International Gold / ATP 500 (1–1) ATP 250 (1–0)	Finals by surface Hard (2–1)	Finals by setting Outdoor (1–1) Indoor (1–0)

Result	W–L	Date	Tournament	Tier	Surface	Partner	Opponents	Score
Win	1–0	Feb 2008	Rotterdam Open, Netherlands	Intl. Gold	Hard (i)	(Russia) Dmitry Tursunov	(Germany) Philipp Kohlschreiber (Russia) Mikhail Youzhny	7–5, 3–6, [10–7]
Loss	1–1	Aug 2010	Washington Open, US	ATP 500	Hard	(Czech Republic) Radek Štěpánek	(United States) Mardy Fish (The Bahamas) Mark Knowles	6–4, 6–7^{(7–9)}, [7–10]
Win	2–1	Jan 2014	Qatar Open, Qatar	ATP 250	Hard	(Czech Republic) Jan Hájek	(Austria) Alexander Peya (Brazil) Bruno Soares	6–2, 6–4

=== Team competition finals: 6 (3 titles, 3 runner-ups) ===
Result	W–L	Date	Tournament	Surface	Partner(s)	Opponents	Score
Loss	0–1	May 26, 2007	World Team Cup, Düsseldorf, Germany	Clay	(Czech Republic) Jan Hájek (Czech Republic) Martin Damm	(Argentina) Juan Ignacio Chela (Argentina) Agustín Calleri (Argentina) José Acasuso	1–2
Loss	0–2	December 4–6, 2009	Davis Cup, Barcelona, Spain	Clay (i)	(Czech Republic) Radek Štěpánek (Czech Republic) Jan Hájek (Czech Republic) Lukáš Dlouhý	(Spain) Rafael Nadal (Spain) David Ferrer (Spain) Fernando Verdasco (Spain) Feliciano López	0–5
Win	1–2	January 17, 2012	Hopman Cup, Perth, Australia	Hard	(Czech Republic) Petra Kvitová	(France) Marion Bartoli (France) Richard Gasquet	2–0
Loss	1–3	May 21, 2012	World Team Cup, Düsseldorf, Germany	Clay	(Czech Republic) Radek Štěpánek (Czech Republic) František Čermák	(Serbia) Janko Tipsarević (Serbia) Viktor Troicki (Serbia) Miki Janković	0–3
Win	2–3	November 16–17, 2012	Davis Cup, Prague, Czech Republic	Hard (i)	(Czech Republic) Radek Štěpánek (Czech Republic) Lukáš Rosol (Czech Republic) Ivo Minář	(Spain) David Ferrer (Spain) Nicolás Almagro (Spain) Marcel Granollers (Spain) Marc López	3–2
Win	3–3	November 15–17, 2013	Davis Cup, Belgrade, Serbia	Hard (i)	(Czech Republic) Radek Štěpánek (Czech Republic) Lukáš Rosol (Czech Republic) Jan Hájek	(Serbia) Novak Djokovic (Serbia) Nenad Zimonjić (Serbia) Dušan Lajović (Serbia) Ilija Bozoljac	3–2

== ATP Challenger Tour finals ==
=== Singles: 5 (titles) ===
Finals by surface
Hard (1–0)
Clay (4–0)

Result	W–L	Date	Tournament	Tier	Surface	Opponent	Score
Win	1–0	Jul 2003	Budaörs, Hungary	Challenger	Clay	(Bulgaria) Ivaylo Traykov	6–2, 6–3
Win	2–0	Aug 2003	Graz, Austria	Challenger	Clay	(Austria) Julian Knowle	6–4, 5–7, 6–2
Win	3–0	Mar 2004	Besançon, France	Challenger	Hard (i)	(France) Julien Benneteau	6–3, 6–1
Win	4–0	Jun 2004	Weiden in der Oberpfalz, Germany	Challenger	Clay	(Serbia and Montenegro) Janko Tipsarević	6–3, 6–3
Win	5–0	Jun 2004	Braunschweig, Germany	Challenger	Clay	(Germany) Daniel Elsner	4–6, 6–1, 6–4

=== Doubles: 3 (2 titles, 1 runner-up) ===
Finals by surface
Hard (1–0)
Clay (1–1)

Result	W–L	Date	Tournament	Tier	Surface	Partner	Opponents	Score
Win	1–0	Mar 2003	Sarajevo, Bosnia	Challenger	Hard (i)	(Czech Republic) Jaroslav Levinský	(Sweden) Simon Aspelin (Sweden) Johan Landsberg	1–6, 7–6^{(8–6)}, 6–4
Win	2–0	May 2003	Prague, Czech Republic	Challenger	Clay	(Czech Republic) Michal Navrátil	(Argentina) Martín García (Argentina) Sebastián Prieto	6–4, 3–6, 6–4
Loss	2–1	Jul 2003	Budaörs, Hungary	Challenger	Clay	(Czech Republic) Michal Navrátil	(Hungary) Gergely Kisgyörgy (Italy) Giancarlo Petrazzuolo	4–6, 6–4, 6–7^{(3–7)}

== ITF Circuit finals ==
=== Singles: 4 (3 titles, 1 runner-up) ===
Legend 15K tournaments (2–1) 10K tournaments (1–0)	Finals by surface Clay (2–0) Carpet (1–1)

Result	W–L	Date	Tournament	Tier	Surface	Opponent	Score
Win	1–0	Sep 2002	Czech Republic F5, Třinec	15K	Clay	(Czech Republic) Pavel Šnobel	6–2, 6–3
Win	2–0	Nov 2002	Czech Republic F8, Hrotovice	10K	Carpet	(Czech Republic) Ladislav Chramosta	6–4, 6–3
Loss	2–1	Jan 2003	Great Britain F1, Glasgow	15K	Carpet	(South Africa) Wesley Moodie	6–7^{(5–7)}, 6–7^{(5–7)}
Win	3–1	May 2003	Great Britain F5, Bournemouth	15K	Clay	(Republic of Ireland) Peter Clarke	6–1, 6–4

=== Doubles: 3 (1 title, 2 runner-ups) ===
Legend 15K tournaments (1–1) 10K tournaments (0–1)	Finals by surface Hard (0–1) Clay (1–1)

Result	W–L	Date	Tournament	Tier	Surface	Partner	Opponents	Score
Loss	0–1	Dec 2002	Czech Republic F9, Ostrava	15K	Hard	(Czech Republic) Lukáš Dlouhý	(Germany) Philipp Petzschner (Germany) Simon Stadler	3–6, 1–6
Loss	0–2	Apr 2003	Italy F1, Rome	10K	Clay	(Czech Republic) Dušan Karol	(Hungary) Gergely Kisgyörgy (Italy) Giancarlo Petrazzuolo	6–7^{(2–7)}, 7–6^{(7–5)}, 5–7
Win	1–2	May 2003	Great Britain F5, Bournemouth	15K	Clay	(Czech Republic) Michal Navrátil	(Australia) Raphael Durek (Australia) Todd Reid	6–3, 6–2

== Career Grand Slam statistics ==
=== Best Grand Slam tournament results details ===
Grand Slam tournament winners are in boldface, and runner-ups are in italics.

**Australian Open**
**2014 Australian Open (7th Seed)**
Round	Opponent	Rank	Score
1R	(Kazakhstan) Oleksandr Nedovyesov		6–3, 6–4, 6–3
2R	(France) Kenny de Schepper		6–4, 6–1, 6–3
3R	(Bosnia and Herzegovina) Damir Džumhur (Q)		6–4, 6–2, 6–2
4R	(South Africa) Kevin Anderson (19)		6–2, 6–2, 6–3
QF	(Spain) David Ferrer (3)		6–1, 6–4, 2–6, 6–4
SF	(Switzerland) Stanislas Wawrinka (8)		3–6, 7–6^{(7–1)}, 6–7^{(3–7)}, 6–7^{(4–7)}
**2015 Australian Open (7th Seed)**
Round	Opponent	Rank	Score
1R	(Colombia) Alejandro Falla		6–3, 7–6^{(7–1)}, 6–3
2R	(Austria) Jürgen Melzer (Q)		7–6^{(7–0)}, 6–2, 6–2
3R	(Serbia) Viktor Troicki		6–4, 6–3, 6–4
4R	(Australia) Bernard Tomic		6–2, 7–6^{(7–3)}, 6–2
QF	(Spain) Rafael Nadal (3)		6–2, 6–0, 7–6^{(7–5)}
SF	(United Kingdom) Andy Murray (6)		7–6^{(8–6)}, 0–6, 3–6, 5–7

**Wimbledon Championships**
**2010 Wimbledon (12th seed)**
Round	Opponent	Rank	Score
1R	(Kazakhstan) Andrey Golubev		7–6^{(7–5)}, 6–2, 6–2
2R	(Germany) Benjamin Becker		7–5, 6–3, 6–4
3R	(Uzbekistan) Denis Istomin		6–7^{(1–7)}, 7–6^{(7–5)}, 6–7^{(8–10)}, 6–3, 6–4
4R	(Germany) Daniel Brands		4–6, 7–6^{(7–1)}, 7–5, 6–3
QF	(Switzerland) Roger Federer (1)		6–4, 3–6, 6–1, 6–4
SF	(Serbia) Novak Djokovic (3)		6–3, 7–6^{(11–9)}, 6–3
F	(Spain) Rafael Nadal (2)		3–6, 5–7, 4–6

**French Open**
**2010 French Open (15th Seed)**
Round	Opponent	Rank	Score
1R	(Chile) Jorge Aguilar (Q)		7–6^{(9–7)}, 6–3, 6–1
2R	(France) Édouard Roger-Vasselin (WC)		7–5, 6–1, 6–4
3R	(United States) John Isner (17)		6–2, 6–2, 6–1
4R	(United Kingdom) Andy Murray (4)		6–4, 7–5, 6–3
QF	(Russia) Mikhail Youzhny (11)		6–3, 6–1, 6–2
SF	(Sweden) Robin Söderling (5)		3–6, 6–3, 7–5, 3–6, 3–6

**US Open**
**2012 US Open (6th Seed)**
Round	Opponent	Rank	Score
1R	(Belgium) David Goffin		7–5, 6–3, 6–3
2R	(Estonia) Jürgen Zopp		6–1, 6–4, 6–2
3R	(United States) Sam Querrey (27)		6–7^{(6–8)}, 6–4, 6–3, 6–2
4R	(Spain) Nicolás Almagro (11)		7–6^{(7–4)}, 6–4, 6–1
QF	(Switzerland) Roger Federer (1)		7–6^{(7–1)}, 6–4, 3–6, 6–3
SF	(United Kingdom) Andy Murray (3)		7–5, 2–6, 1–6, 6–7^{(7–9)}

=== Career Grand Slam tournament seedings ===
The tournaments won by Berdych are in boldface, and advanced into finals by Muchová are in italics.

Season	Australian Open	French Open	Wimbledon	US Open
2002	did not play	did not play	did not play	did not play
2003	did not play	did not play	did not play	lucky loser
2004	qualifier	not seeded	not seeded	not seeded
2005	not seeded	not seeded	not seeded	32nd
2006	19th	20th	13th	12th
2007	13th	10th	7th	9th
2008	13th	11th	11th	22nd
2009	20th	19th	20th	17th
2010	21st	15th	12th	7th
2011	6th	6th	6th	9th
2012	7th	7th	6th	6th
2013	5th	5th	7th	5th
2014	7th	6th	6th	6th
2015	7th	4th	6th	6th
2016	6th	7th	10th	did not play
2017	10th	13th	11th	15th
2018	19th	17th	did not play	did not play
2019	not seeded	did not play	Protected ranking	Protected ranking

== Wins against top 10 players ==
- Berdych has a 53–124 record against players who were, at the time the match was played, ranked in the top 10.

Season	2004	2005	2006	2007	2008	2009	2010	2011	2012	2013	2014	2015	2016	2017	2018	2019	Total
Wins	1	3	5	2	2	1	6	6	7	6	5	3	2	3	1	0	53

No.	Player	Rk	Event	Surface	Rd	Score	Rk	Years	Ref
1.	(Switzerland) Roger Federer	1	Olympics, Athens, Greece	Hard	2R	4–6, 7–5, 7–5		2004	
2.	(Spain) Rafael Nadal	2	Cincinnati, United States	Hard	1R	6–7^{(4–7)}, 6–2, 7–6^{(7–3)}		2005	
3.	(Argentina) Guillermo Coria	7	Paris, France	Carpet (i)	2R	6–4, 6–2		2005	
4.	(Croatia) Ivan Ljubičić	10	Paris, France	Carpet (i)	F	6–3, 6–4, 3–6, 4–6, 6–4		2005	
5.	(Australia) Lleyton Hewitt	10	Indian Wells, United States	Hard	3R	7–5, 6–3		2006	
6.	(Argentina) David Nalbandian	3	World Team Cup, Düsseldorf, Germany	Clay	RR	6–4, 6–4		2006	
7.	(Spain) Rafael Nadal	2	Toronto, Canada	Hard	3R	6–1, 3–6, 6–2		2006	
8.	(United States) Andy Roddick	6	Madrid, Spain	Hard (i)	3R	7–6^{(9–7)}, 6–3		2006	
9.	(Spain) Rafael Nadal	2	Madrid, Spain	Hard (i)	QF	6–3, 7–6^{(8–6)}		2006	
10.	(United States) James Blake	6	Davis Cup, Ostrava, Czech Republic	Clay (i)	RR	6–1, 2–6, 7–5, 7–5		2007	
11.	(Spain) Tommy Robredo	6	Monte Carlo, Monaco	Clay	3R	1–6, 6–3, 6–2		2007	
12.	(United States) James Blake	8	World Team Cup, Düsseldorf, Germany	Clay	RR	7–6^{(7–5)}, 7–6^{(7–5)}		2008	
13.	(United States) Andy Roddick	8	Tokyo, Japan	Hard	SF	6–7^{(3–7)}, 7–5, 7–6^{(7–3)}		2008	
14.	(France) Gilles Simon	8	Davis Cup, Ostrava, Czech Republic	Carpet (i)	RR	7–6^{(7–3)}, 4–6, 7–6^{(7–2)}, 6–2		2009	
15.	(Switzerland) Roger Federer	1	Miami, United States	Hard	4R	6–4, 6–7^{(3–7)}, 7–6^{(8–6)}		2010	
16.	(Sweden) Robin Söderling	7	Miami, United States	Hard	SF	6–2, 6–2		2010	
17.	(United Kingdom) Andy Murray	4	French Open, Paris, France	Clay	4R	6–4, 7–5, 6–3		2010	
18.	(Switzerland) Roger Federer	2	Wimbledon, London, England	Grass	QF	6–4, 3–6, 6–1, 6–4		2010	
19.	(Serbia) Novak Djokovic	3	Wimbledon, London, England	Grass	SF	6–3, 7–6^{(11–9)}, 6–3		2010	
20.	(United States) Andy Roddick	8	World Tour Finals, London, England	Hard (i)	RR	7–5, 6–3		2010	
21.	(Spain) Fernando Verdasco	9	Australian Open, Melbourne, Australia	Hard	4R	6–4, 6–2, 6–3		2011	
22.	(Switzerland) Roger Federer	3	Cincinnati, United States	Hard	QF	6–2, 7–6^{(7–3)}		2011	
23.	(France) Jo-Wilfried Tsonga	7	Beijing, China	Hard	SF	6–4, 4–6, 6–1		2011	
24.	(United Kingdom) Andy Murray	3	Paris, France	Hard (i)	QF	4–6, 7–6^{(7–5)}, 6–4		2011	
25.	(Serbia) Janko Tipsarević	9	World Tour Finals, London, England	Hard (i)	RR	2–6, 6–3, 7–6^{(8–6)}		2011	
26.	(Spain) David Ferrer	5	World Tour Finals, London, England	Hard (i)	RR	3–6, 7–5, 6–1		2011	
27.	(Spain) Nicolás Almagro	10	Australian Open, Melbourne, Australia	Hard	4R	4–6, 7–6^{(7–5)}, 7–6^{(7–3)}, 7–6^{(7–2)}		2012	
28.	(Serbia) Janko Tipsarević	8	Davis Cup, Prague, Czech Republic	Clay (i)	RR	7–6^{(8–6)}, 7–6^{(8–6)}, 7–6^{(9–7)}		2012	
29.	(United Kingdom) Andy Murray	4	Monte Carlo, Monaco	Clay	QF	6–7^{(4–7)}, 6–2, 6–3		2012	
30.	(Switzerland) Roger Federer	1	US Open, New York, United States	Hard	QF	7–6^{(7–1)}, 6–4, 3–6, 6–3		2012	
31.	(France) Jo-Wilfried Tsonga	6	Shanghai, China	Hard	QF	6–3, 7–6^{(7–4)}		2012	
32.	(France) Jo-Wilfried Tsonga	7	Stockholm, Sweden	Hard (i)	F	4–6, 6–4, 6–4		2012	
33.	(France) Jo-Wilfried Tsonga	8	World Tour Finals, London, England	Hard (i)	RR	7–5, 3–6, 6–1		2012	
34.	(Switzerland) Roger Federer	2	Dubai, United Arab Emirates	Hard	SF	3–6, 7–6^{(10–8)}, 6–4		2013	
35.	(France) Richard Gasquet	10	Indian Wells, United States	Hard	4R	6–1, 7–5		2013	
36.	(United Kingdom) Andy Murray	3	Madrid, Spain	Clay	QF	7–6^{(7–3)}, 6–3		2013	
37.	(Serbia) Novak Djokovic	1	Rome, Italy	Clay	QF	2–6, 7–5, 6–4		2013	
38.	(United Kingdom) Andy Murray	2	Cincinnati, United States	Hard	QF	6–3, 6–4		2013	
39.	(Spain) David Ferrer	3	World Tour Finals, London, England	Hard (i)	RR	6–4, 6–4		2013	
40.	(Spain) David Ferrer	3	Australian Open, Melbourne, Australia	Hard	QF	6–1, 6–4, 2–6, 6–4		2014	
41.	(France) Jo-Wilfried Tsonga	10	Dubai Tennis Championships, Dubai, UAE	Hard	QF	6–4, 6–3		2014	
42.	(United States) John Isner	10	Miami, United States	Hard	4R	6–3, 7–5		2014	
43.	(Bulgaria) Grigor Dimitrov	10	Stockholm, Sweden	Hard (i)	F	5–7, 6–4, 6–4		2014	
44.	(Croatia) Marin Čilić	9	World Tour Finals, London, England	Hard (i)	RR	6–3, 6–1		2014	
45.	(Spain) Rafael Nadal	3	Australian Open, Melbourne, Australia	Hard	QF	6–2, 6–0, 7–6^{(7–5)}		2015	
46.	(Canada) Milos Raonic	6	Monte Carlo, Monaco	Clay	QF	5–2, Ret.		2015	
47.	(France) Jo-Wilfried Tsonga	10	Paris, France	Hard (i)	3R	6–3, 6–4		2015	
48.	(France) Richard Gasquet	10	Miami, United States	Hard	4R	6–4, 3–6, 7–5		2016	
49.	(Spain) David Ferrer	9	Madrid, Spain	Clay	3R	7–6^{(10–8)}, 7–5		2016	
50.	(Canada) Milos Raonic	6	Lyon, France	Clay	SF	7–6^{(7–5)}, 7–6^{(7–2)}		2017	
51.	(Austria) Dominic Thiem	8	Wimbledon, London, England	Grass	4R	6–3, 6–7^{(1–7)}, 6–3, 3–6, 6–3		2017	
52.	(Serbia) Novak Djokovic	4	Wimbledon, London, England	Grass	QF	7–6^{(7–2)}, 2–0, Ret.		2017	
53.	(Argentina) Juan Martín del Potro	10	Australian Open, Melbourne, Australia	Hard	3R	6–3, 6–3, 6–2		2018	

- Key: (Rk) first use, opponent rank; (Rd) round; (Rk) 2nd use, player rank; (Ref) reference; (F) final; (SF) semifinal; (QF) quarterfinal; (#R) rounds 4, 3, 2, 1; (RR) round-robin stage; (Q#) qualifying rounds or stages (3), 2, 1.
