= 2004 Campionati Internazionali di Sicilia =

- Date: 27 September – 3 October
- Edition: 26th
- Category: International Series
- Draw: 32S / 16D
- Prize money: $355,000
- Surface: Clay / outdoor
- Location: Palermo, Italy

Champions

Singles
- (Czech Republic) Tomáš Berdych

Doubles
- (Argentina) Lucas Arnold Ker / (Argentina) Mariano Hood
← 2003 ·	Campionati Internazionali di Sicilia	· 2005 →

The 2004 Campionati Internazionali di Sicilia was a men's tennis tournaments played on outdoor clay courts in Palermo, Italy that was part of the International Series of the 2004 ATP Tour. It was the 26th edition of the tournament and was held from 27 September until 3 October 2004. Eighth-seeded Tomáš Berdych won the singles title.

== Finals ==
=== Singles ===
(Czech Republic) Tomáš Berdych defeated (Italy) Filippo Volandri 6–3, 6–3

- It was Berdych's first singles title of his career.

=== Doubles ===
(Argentina) Lucas Arnold Ker / (Argentina) Mariano Hood defeated (Argentina) Gastón Etlis / (Argentina) Martín Rodríguez 7–5, 6–2
