= 2004 Campionati Internazionali di Sicilia – Doubles =

Doubles
- 2004 Campionati Internazionali di Sicilia

Final
- Champions: (Argentina) Lucas Arnold Ker (Argentina) Mariano Hood
- Runners-up: (Argentina) Gastón Etlis (Argentina) Martín Rodríguez
- Score: 7–5, 6–2

Events
Singles	Doubles
← 2003 ·	Campionati Internazionali di Sicilia	· 2005 →

Lucas Arnold Ker and Mariano Hood successfully defended their title by defeating Gastón Etlis and Martín Rodríguez 7–5, 6–2 in the final. Arnold Ker won the tournament for the third year in a row.

== Seeds ==
1. (Argentina) Gastón Etlis / (Argentina) Martín Rodríguez (final)
2. (Czech Republic) František Čermák / (Czech Republic) Leoš Friedl (semifinals)
3. (Argentina) Lucas Arnold Ker / (Argentina) Mariano Hood (champions)
4. (Poland) Mariusz Fyrstenberg / (Poland) Marcin Matkowski (semifinals)

== Draw ==
=== Key ===
- Q = Qualifier
- WC = Wild card
- LL = Lucky loser
- Alt = Alternate
- SE = Special exempt
- PR = Protected ranking
- ITF = ITF entry
- JE = Junior exempt
- w/o = Walkover
- r = Retired
- d = Defaulted
- SR = Special ranking

=== Draw ===
First round
1	(Argentina) G Etlis (Argentina) M Rodríguez	w/o
WC	(Czech Republic) T Berdych (Germany) P Kohlschreiber
WC	(Italy) F Aldi (Italy) A di Mauro	3	4
(Argentina) J Acasuso (Argentina) J Mónaco	6	6
4	(Poland) M Fyrstenberg (Poland) M Matkowski	2	6	7^{8}
(Italy) D Bracciali (Italy) G Galimberti	6	3	6^{6}
(Spain) D Ferrer (Spain) A López Morón	6^{6}	2
(Czech Republic) J Levinský (Czech Republic) D Škoch	7^{8}	6
(Spain) Á Calatrava (Spain) Ó Hernández	3	1
(Italy) M Bertolini (Belgium) T Vanhoudt	6	6
(Spain) E Benfele Álvarez (Spain) A Montañés	1	4
3	(Argentina) L Arnold Ker (Argentina) M Hood	6	6
(Italy) A Seppi (Italy) P Starace	6	6
(Italy) E Artoni (Czech Republic) T Cibulec	4	3
(Spain) A Martín (Spain) D Sánchez	1^{r}
2	(Czech Republic) F Čermák (Czech Republic) L Friedl	2

Quarterfinals
1	(Argentina) G Etlis (Argentina) M Rodríguez	w/o
(Argentina) J Acasuso (Argentina) J Mónaco
4	(Poland) M Fyrstenberg (Poland) M Matkowski	7^{7}	7
(Czech Republic) J Levinský (Czech Republic) D Škoch	6^{3}	5
(Italy) M Bertolini (Belgium) T Vanhoudt	3	6^{6}
3	(Argentina) L Arnold Ker (Argentina) M Hood	6	7^{8}
(Italy) A Seppi (Italy) P Starace
2	(Czech Republic) F Čermák (Czech Republic) L Friedl	w/o

Semifinals
1	(Argentina) G Etlis (Argentina) M Rodríguez	4	6	6
4	(Poland) M Fyrstenberg (Poland) M Matkowski	6	2	3
3	(Argentina) L Arnold Ker (Argentina) M Hood	6	6
2	(Czech Republic) F Čermák (Czech Republic) L Friedl	3	4

Final
1	(Argentina) G Etlis (Argentina) M Rodríguez	5	2
3	(Argentina) L Arnold Ker (Argentina) M Hood	7	6
