= 2005 Campionati Internazionali di Sicilia =

- Date: 26 September – 2 October
- Edition: 27th
- Category: International Series
- Draw: 32S / 16D
- Prize money: €323,250
- Surface: Clay / outdoor
- Location: Palermo, Italy

Champions

Singles
- (Russia) Igor Andreev

Doubles
- (Argentina) Martín García / (Argentina) Mariano Hood
← 2004 ·	Campionati Internazionali di Sicilia	· 2006 →

The 2005 Campionati Internazionali di Sicilia was a men's tennis tournaments played on outdoor clay courts in Palermo, Italy that was part of the International Series of the 2005 ATP Tour. It was the 27th edition of the tournament and was held from 26 September until 2 October 2005. Unseeded Igor Andreev won the singles title.

== Finals ==
=== Singles ===
(Russia) Igor Andreev defeated (Italy) Filippo Volandri 0–6, 6–1, 6–3

- It was Andreev's 2nd singles title of the year and of his career.

=== Doubles ===
(Argentina) Martín García / (Argentina) Mariano Hood defeated (Poland) Mariusz Fyrstenberg / (Poland) Marcin Matkowski 6–2, 6–3
