= Budapest Challenger =

Budapest Challenger may refer to:

- Budapest Challenger (May), became the Budapest Challenger, when it moved to a calendar spot preceding the other Hungarian Budapest Challenger
- Budapest Challenger (September), originally called the Budapest Challenger, it is the longest running defunct Challenger in Hungary with a span of 20 years
- Stella Artois Clay Court Championships, a short-lived Challenger, also from Budapest, but different district
