= 2005 Campionati Internazionali di Sicilia – Singles =

Singles
- 2005 Campionati Internazionali di Sicilia

Final
- Champion: (Russia) Igor Andreev
- Runner-up: (Italy) Filippo Volandri
- Score: 0–6, 6–1, 6–3

Details
- Draw: 32 (3WC/4Q)
- Seeds: 8

Events
Singles	Doubles
← 2004 ·	Campionati Internazionali di Sicilia	· 2006 →

Tomáš Berdych was the defending champion, but lost in the first round to Andreas Seppi.

Igor Andreev won the title by defeating Filippo Volandri 0–6, 6–1, 6–3 in the final.

== Seeds ==
1. (Spain) David Ferrer (first round)
2. (Spain) Tommy Robredo (quarterfinals)
3. (Spain) Juan Carlos Ferrero (quarterfinals)
4. (Czech Republic) Tomáš Berdych (first round)
5. (Spain) Fernando Verdasco (second round)
6. (Italy) Filippo Volandri (final)
7. (France) Gaël Monfils (first round)
8. (Italy) Davide Sanguinetti (quarterfinals)

== Draw ==
=== Key ===
- Q = Qualifier
- WC = Wild card
- LL = Lucky loser
- Alt = Alternate
- SE = Special exempt
- PR = Protected ranking
- ITF = ITF entry
- JE = Junior exempt
- w/o = Walkover
- r = Retired
- d = Defaulted
- SR = Special ranking

=== Finals ===
Semifinals
(Russia) Igor Andreev	6	6
(Italy) Andreas Seppi	2	4
(Germany) Tomas Behrend	4	2
6	(Italy) Filippo Volandri	6	6

Final
(Russia) Igor Andreev	0	6	6
6	(Italy) Filippo Volandri	6	1	3

=== Top half ===
First round
1	(Spain) D Ferrer	2	2
WC	(Italy) F Aldi	6	6
(Spain) N Almagro	4	6	4
(Russia) I Andreev	6	2	6
Q	(Germany) D Elsner	4	6	7
Q	(Italy) F Fognini	6	3	5
(Spain) A Martín	1	6	6
7	(France) G Monfils	6	1	4
4	(Czech Republic) T Berdych	6	4	4
(Italy) A Seppi	4	6	6
(Argentina) M Zabaleta	3	6^{6}
(Romania) R Sabău	6	7^{8}
(Argentina) JI Chela	6	6
Q	(Spain) JA Sánchez de Luna	4	2
(France) F Serra	7^{12}	1	2
8	(Italy) D Sanguinetti	6^{10}	6	6

Second round
WC	(Italy) F Aldi	6	0	3
(Russia) I Andreev	2	6	6
Q	(Germany) D Elsner	4	2
(Spain) A Martín	6	6
(Italy) A Seppi	6^{6}	6	7
(Romania) R Sabău	7^{8}	3	5
(Argentina) JI Chela	3	4
8	(Italy) D Sanguinetti	6	6

Quarterfinals
(Russia) I Andreev	7	7
(Spain) A Martín	5	5
(Italy) A Seppi	6	6
8	(Italy) D Sanguinetti	3	4

Semifinals
(Russia) I Andreev	6	6
(Italy) A Seppi	2	4

=== Bottom half ===
First round
5	(Spain) F Verdasco	6	6
(Czech Republic) T Zíb	2	2
(Germany) T Behrend	6	4	6
(Italy) D Bracciali	4	6	3
(Spain) Ó Hernández	6^{3}	6	6
WC	(Italy) G Naso	7^{7}	0	4
(Germany) F Mayer	3	3
3/WC	(Spain) JC Ferrero	6	6
6	(Italy) F Volandri	6	6
(Chile) N Massú	3	0
(Belgium) C Rochus	6	6
(Spain) D Sánchez	1	2
(Argentina) A Calleri	5	0
(Spain) A Montañés	7	6
Q	(Spain) A Portas	3	5
2	(Spain) T Robredo	6	7

Second round
5	(Spain) F Verdasco	4	6	1
(Germany) T Behrend	6	2	6
(Spain) Ó Hernández	3	4
3/WC	(Spain) JC Ferrero	6	6
6	(Italy) F Volandri	6	6
(Belgium) C Rochus	0	0
(Spain) A Montañés	5	2
2	(Spain) T Robredo	7	6

Quarterfinals
(Germany) T Behrend	6^{2}	7^{7}	7
3/WC	(Spain) JC Ferrero	7^{7}	6^{4}	5
6	(Italy) F Volandri	6	6
2	(Spain) T Robredo	4	2

Semifinals
(Germany) T Behrend	4	2
6	(Italy) F Volandri	6	6
