= 2003 Campionati Internazionali di Sicilia – Singles =

Singles
- 2003 Campionati Internazionali di Sicilia

Final
- Champion: (Chile) Nicolás Massú
- Runner-up: (France) Paul-Henri Mathieu
- Score: 1–6, 6–2, 7–6^{(7–0)}

Details
- Draw: 32
- Seeds: 8

Events
Singles	Doubles
← 2002 ·	Campionati Internazionali di Sicilia	· 2004 →

Fernando González was the defending champion but did not compete that year.

Nicolás Massú won in the final 1–6, 6–2, 7–6^{(7–0)} against Paul-Henri Mathieu.

== Seeds ==
A champion seed is indicated in bold text while text in italics indicates the round in which that seed was eliminated.

1. (Chile) **Nicolás Massú (champion)**
2. (Russia) Nikolay Davydenko (first round)
3. (Spain) David Sánchez (first round)
4. (Italy) Filippo Volandri (second round)
5. (France) Paul-Henri Mathieu (final)
6. (Spain) Alberto Martín (semifinals)
7. (Spain) Rubén Ramírez Hidalgo (first round)
8. (Peru) Luis Horna (semifinals)

== Draw ==
=== Key ===
- Q = Qualifier
- WC = Wild card
- LL = Lucky loser
- Alt = Alternate
- SE = Special exempt
- PR = Protected ranking
- ITF = ITF entry
- JE = Junior exempt
- w/o = Walkover
- r = Retired
- d = Defaulted
- SR = Special ranking

First round
1	(Chile) **N Massú**	**6**	**6**
(Belgium) C Rochus	4	2
(Argentina) **J Acasuso**	**6**	**6**
Q	(Spain) J Giner	3	2
(Argentina) M Vassallo Argüello	3	4
(Germany) **T Behrend**	**6**	**6**
(Spain) **A Montañés**	**6**	**6**
7	(Spain) R Ramírez Hidalgo	2	4
3	(Spain) D Sánchez	2	**6**	6^{8}
(Spain) **Ó Hernández**	**6**	0	**7^{10}**
(Georgia (country)) I Labadze	0	2
Q	(Italy) **T Tenconi**	**6**	**6**
(Austria) J Melzer	2	**6**	4
(Argentina) **M Puerta**	**6**	4	**6**
(Romania) A Pavel	6^{6}	5
8	(Peru) **L Horna**	**7^{8}**	**7**
6	(Spain) **A Martín**	**7^{7}**	**6**
(Spain) D Ferrer	6^{4}	2
(Belgium) K Vliegen	5	5
(Spain) **G Blanco**	**7**	**7**
(Argentina) **F Squillari**	**6**	**6**
WC	(Italy) A di Mauro	4	3
WC	(Italy) F Aldi	2	5
4	(Italy) **F Volandri**	**6**	**7**
5	(France) **P-H Mathieu**	4	**6**	**7^{7}**
(Spain) A Portas	**6**	3	6^{5}
WC	(Spain) À Corretja	1	r
Q	(Spain) **N Almagro**	**3**
(Romania) **V Hănescu**	**6**	**6**
(Russia) I Andreev	3	3
Q	(Argentina) **D Veronelli**	**6**	**6**
2	(Russia) N Davydenko	4	4

Second round
1	(Chile) **N Massú**	**6**	**3**
(Argentina) J Acasuso	2	1	r
(Germany) T Behrend	0	4
(Spain) **A Montañés**	**6**	**6**
(Spain) **Ó Hernández**	**7^{7}**	**6**
Q	(Italy) T Tenconi	6^{3}	3
(Argentina) M Puerta	4	2
8	(Peru) **L Horna**	**6**	**6**
6	(Spain) **A Martín**	**4**
(Spain) G Blanco	0	r
(Argentina) **F Squillari**	**w/o**
4	(Italy) F Volandri
5	(France) **P-H Mathieu**	**7^{8}**	3	**6**
Q	(Spain) N Almagro	6^{6}	**6**	3
(Romania) V Hănescu	4	2
Q	(Argentina) **D Veronelli**	**6**	**6**

Quarterfinals
1	(Chile) **N Massú**	**6**	1	**6**
(Spain) A Montañés	4	**6**	4
(Spain) Ó Hernández	**6**	6^{7}	1
8	(Peru) **L Horna**	3	**7^{9}**	**6**
6	(Spain) **A Martín**	**7^{7}**	**6**
(Argentina) F Squillari	6^{3}	4
5	(France) **P-H Mathieu**	4	**7^{7}**	**6**
Q	(Argentina) D Veronelli	**6**	6^{5}	3

Semifinals
1	(Chile) **N Massú**	**6**	**6**
8	(Peru) L Horna	2	2
6	(Spain) A Martín	6^{5}	6^{5}
5	(France) **P-H Mathieu**	**7^{7}**	**7^{7}**

Final
1	(Chile) **Nicolás Massú**	1	**6**	**7^{7}**
5	(France) Paul-Henri Mathieu	**6**	2	6^{0}
