= 2002 Campionati Internazionali di Sicilia – Doubles =

Doubles
- 2002 Campionati Internazionali di Sicilia
- 2001 Champions: (Spain) Tomás Carbonell (Argentina) Daniel Orsanic

Final
- Champions: (Argentina) Lucas Arnold (Argentina) Luis Lobo
- Runners-up: (Czech Republic) František Čermák (Czech Republic) Leoš Friedl
- Score: 6–4, 4–6, 6–2

Events
| Singles | Doubles |
| ← 2001 · | Campionati Internazionali di Sicilia | · 2003 → |

Tomás Carbonell and Daniel Orsanic were the defending champions but did not compete that year.

Lucas Arnold and Luis Lobo won in the final 6–4, 4–6, 6–2 against František Čermák and Leoš Friedl.

== Seeds ==
Champion seeds are indicated in bold text while text in italics indicates the round in which those seeds were eliminated.

1. (Czech Republic) Petr Pála / (Czech Republic) Pavel Vízner (first round)
2. (Czech Republic) František Čermák / (Czech Republic) Leoš Friedl (final)
3. (Sweden) Simon Aspelin / (Russia) Andrei Olhovskiy (first round)
4. (South Africa) Jeff Coetzee / (South Africa) Chris Haggard (semifinals)

== Draw ==
=== Key ===
- Q = Qualifier
- WC = Wild card
- LL = Lucky loser
- Alt = Alternate
- ITF = ITF entry
- PR = Protected ranking
- SR = Special ranking
- SE = Special exempt
- JE = Junior exempt
- JR = Junior Accelerator Programme entrant
- CO = College Accelerator Programme entrant
- NG = Next Gen Accelerator Program entrant
- w/o = Walkover
- r = Retired
- d = Defaulted

First round
1 | (Czech Republic) P Pála (Czech Republic) P Vízner | 4 | 1
(United States) **D Bowen** (Australia) **A Fisher** | **6** | **6**
WC | (Italy) **M Bertolini** (Italy) **C Brandi** | **6** | **6**
(Spain) Á López Morón (Argentina) A Schneiter | 4 | 2
3 | (Sweden) S Aspelin (Russia) A Olhovskiy | 4 | 5
(Argentina) **L Arnold** (Argentina) **L Lobo** | **6** | **7**
(Spain) **J I Carrasco** (Argentina) **M Hood** | **6** | **6**
WC | (Italy) R Furlan (Italy) A Seppi | 2 | 2
(Argentina) J Acasuso (Chile) F González | 3 | 6^{6}
WC | (Italy) **A Gaudenzi** (United States) **J Tarango** | **6** | **7^{8}**
(Germany) K Braasch (Sweden) P Nyborg | **7** | 3 | 3
4 | (South Africa) **J Coetzee** (South Africa) **C Haggard** | 5 | **6** | **6**
ALT | (Spain) E Benfele Álvarez (Armenia) S Sargsian | **7^{7}** | 4 | 4
(Argentina) **M García** (Argentina) **M Rodríguez** | 6^{5} | **6** | **6**
(Sweden) J Landsberg (Belgium) T Vanhoudt | 6^{6} | **7^{7}** | 3
2 | (Czech Republic) **F Čermák** (Czech Republic) **L Friedl** | **7^{8}** | 6^{2} | **6**

Quarterfinals
(United States) D Bowen (Australia) A Fisher | **6** | 3 | 4
WC | (Italy) **M Bertolini** (Italy) **C Brandi** | 3 | **6** | **6**
(Argentina) **L Arnold** (Argentina) **L Lobo** | **6** | **6**
(Spain) J I Carrasco (Argentina) M Hood | 0 | 1
WC | (Italy) A Gaudenzi (United States) J Tarango | **7** | 4 | 6^{3}
4 | (South Africa) **J Coetzee** (South Africa) **C Haggard** | 5 | **6** | **7^{7}**
(Argentina) M García (Argentina) M Rodríguez | 1 | 3
2 | (Czech Republic) **F Čermák** (Czech Republic) **L Friedl** | **6** | **6**

Semifinals
WC | (Italy) M Bertolini (Italy) C Brandi | 3 | 3
(Argentina) **L Arnold** (Argentina) **L Lobo** | **6** | **6**
4 | (South Africa) J Coetzee (South Africa) C Haggard | 4 | 1
2 | (Czech Republic) **F Čermák** (Czech Republic) **L Friedl** | **6** | **6**

Final
(Argentina) **Lucas Arnold** (Argentina) **Luis Lobo** | **6** | 4 | **6**
2 | (Czech Republic) František Čermák (Czech Republic) Leoš Friedl | 4 | **6** | 2
