= 2006 Campionati Internazionali di Sicilia – Doubles =

Doubles
- 2006 Campionati Internazionali di Sicilia

Final
- Champions: (Argentina) Martín García (Peru) Luis Horna
- Runners-up: (Poland) Mariusz Fyrstenberg (Poland) Marcin Matkowski
- Score: 7–6^{(7–1)}, 7–6^{(7–2)}

Events
Singles	Doubles
- Campionati Internazionali di Sicilia

Martín García and Mariano Hood were the defending champions, but Hood could not compete due to his 1-year ban due to doping. Hood decided to retire from professional tennis instead.

García teamed up with Luis Horna and successfully defended his title by defeating Mariusz Fyrstenberg and Marcin Matkowski 7–6^{(7–1)}, 7–6^{(7–2)} in the final. It was the 6th title for García and the 2nd title for Horna in their respective doubles careers.

== Seeds ==
1. (Poland) Mariusz Fyrstenberg / (Poland) Marcin Matkowski (final)
2. (Czech Republic) František Čermák / (Czech Republic) Jaroslav Levinský (quarterfinals)
3. (Czech Republic) Leoš Friedl / (Slovakia) Michal Mertiňák (quarterfinals)
4. (Switzerland) Yves Allegro / (Sweden) Robert Lindstedt (quarterfinals)

== Draw ==
Key

- Q = Qualifier
- WC = Wild card
- LL = Lucky loser
- Alt = Alternate
- ITF = ITF entry
- PR = Protected ranking
- SR = Special ranking
- SE = Special exempt
- JE = Junior exempt
- JR = Junior Accelerator Programme entrant
- CO = College Accelerator Programme entrant
- NG = Next Gen Accelerator Program entrant
- w/o = Walkover
- r = Retired
- d = Defaulted

=== Draw ===
First round
1	(Poland) M Fyrstenberg (Poland) M Matkowski	6	6
(Spain) A Montañés (Spain) R Ramírez Hidalgo	0	2
(Italy) L Azzaro (Argentina) S Roitman	6	6
WC	(Italy) F Fognini (Italy) G Naso	3	2
4	(Switzerland) Y Allegro (Sweden) R Lindstedt	w/o
(Czech Republic) D Škoch (Czech Republic) J Vaněk
(Czech Republic) T Cibulec (Czech Republic) J Hájek	6	6
(Italy) D Bracciali (Italy) G Galimberti	4	2
WC	(Italy) A Seppi (Italy) S Vagnozzi	5	6	[6]
(Argentina) M García (Peru) L Horna	7	4	[10]
(Spain) N Almagro (Spain) G García-López	3	0
3	(Czech Republic) L Friedl (Slovakia) M Mertiňák	6	6
(Germany) C Kas (Austria) O Marach	6	6^{3}	[10]
(Italy) F Luzzi (Italy) P Starace	3	7^{7}	[5]
Alt	(Italy) F Aldi (Italy) A di Mauro	2	5
2	(Czech Republic) F Čermák (Czech Republic) J Levinský	6	7

Quarterfinals
1	(Poland) M Fyrstenberg (Poland) M Matkowski	7	7^{7}
(Italy) L Azzaro (Argentina) S Roitman	5	6^{5}
4	(Switzerland) Y Allegro (Sweden) R Lindstedt	5	7^{9}	[7]
(Czech Republic) T Cibulec (Czech Republic) J Hájek	7	6^{7}	[10]
(Argentina) M García (Peru) L Horna	5	6	[10]
3	(Czech Republic) L Friedl (Slovakia) M Mertiňák	7	4	[4]
(Germany) C Kas (Austria) O Marach	6	7^{7}
2	(Czech Republic) F Čermák (Czech Republic) J Levinský	2	6^{1}

Semifinals
1	(Poland) M Fyrstenberg (Poland) M Matkowski	6	6
(Czech Republic) T Cibulec (Czech Republic) J Hájek	1	4
(Argentina) M García (Peru) L Horna	6	7^{7}
(Germany) C Kas (Austria) O Marach	3	6^{4}

Final
1	(Poland) M Fyrstenberg (Poland) M Matkowski	6^{1}	6^{2}
(Argentina) M García (Peru) L Horna	7^{7}	7^{7}
