= 2003 Campionati Internazionali di Sicilia – Doubles =

Doubles
- 2003 Campionati Internazionali di Sicilia
- 2002 Champions: (Argentina) Lucas Arnold (Argentina) Luis Lobo

Final
- Champions: (Argentina) Lucas Arnold (Argentina) Mariano Hood
- Runners-up: (Czech Republic) František Čermák (Czech Republic) Leoš Friedl
- Score: 7–6^{(8–6)}, 6–7^{(3–7)}, 6–3

Events
Singles	Doubles
← 2002 ·	Campionati Internazionali di Sicilia	· 2004 →

Lucas Arnold and Luis Lobo were the defending champions but only Arnold competed that year with Mariano Hood.

Arnold and Hood won in the final 7–6^{(8–6)}, 6–7^{(3–7)}, 6–3 against František Čermák and Leoš Friedl.

== Seeds ==
Champion seeds are indicated in bold text while text in italics indicates the round in which those seeds were eliminated.

1. (Czech Republic) František Čermák / (Czech Republic) Leoš Friedl (final)
2. (Argentina) **Lucas Arnold** / (Argentina) **Mariano Hood (champions)**
3. (Sweden) Simon Aspelin / (Italy) Massimo Bertolini (first round)
4. (United States) Devin Bowen / (Australia) Ashley Fisher (semifinals)

== Draw ==
=== Key ===
- Q = Qualifier
- WC = Wild card
- LL = Lucky loser
- Alt = Alternate
- SE = Special exempt
- PR = Protected ranking
- ITF = ITF entry
- JE = Junior exempt
- w/o = Walkover
- r = Retired
- d = Defaulted
- SR = Special ranking

First round
1	(Czech Republic) **F Čermák** (Czech Republic) **L Friedl**	3	**6**	**6**
(Spain) D Ferrer (Spain) A Portas	**6**	3	4
(Germany) **K Braasch** (Spain) **Á López Morón**	**6**	**6**
ALT	(Argentina) J P Guzmán (Argentina) M Vassallo Argüello	4	4
3	(Sweden) S Aspelin (Italy) M Bertolini	3	0
(Belgium) **C Rochus** (Belgium) **T Vanhoudt**	**6**	**6**
WC	(Argentina) **M Delfino** (Argentina) **S Roitman**	**6**	**6**
(Austria) J Knowle (Austria) J Melzer	3	3
WC	(Spain) **E Benfele Álvarez** (Spain) **J I Carrasco**	**6**	**6**
(Argentina) J Acasuso (Spain) R Ramírez Hidalgo	3	4
(South Africa) D Adams (Germany) M Kohlmann	**6**	2	3
4	(United States) **D Bowen** (Australia) **A Fisher**	4	**6**	**6**
(Italy) E Artoni (Spain) Ó Hernández	**6**	3	4
(Peru) **L Horna** (Argentina) **S Prieto**	4	**6**	**6**
(Czech Republic) J Levinský (Czech Republic) D Škoch	**6**	4	1
2	(Argentina) **L Arnold** (Argentina) **M Hood**	2	**6**	**6**

Quarterfinals
1	(Czech Republic) **F Čermák** (Czech Republic) **L Friedl**	**7**	**6**
(Germany) K Braasch (Spain) Á López Morón	5	4
(Belgium) **C Rochus** (Belgium) **T Vanhoudt**	2	**6**	**6**
WC	(Argentina) M Delfino (Argentina) S Roitman	**6**	3	3
WC	(Spain) E Benfele Álvarez (Spain) J I Carrasco	**6**	3	4
4	(United States) **D Bowen** (Australia) **A Fisher**	3	**6**	**6**
(Peru) L Horna (Argentina) S Prieto	4	1
2	(Argentina) **L Arnold** (Argentina) **M Hood**	**6**	**6**

Semifinals
1	(Czech Republic) **F Čermák** (Czech Republic) **L Friedl**	**7^{7}**	**6**
(Belgium) C Rochus (Belgium) T Vanhoudt	6^{1}	3
4	(United States) D Bowen (Australia) A Fisher	6^{4}	3
2	(Argentina) **L Arnold** (Argentina) **M Hood**	**7^{7}**	**6**

Final
1	(Czech Republic) František Čermák (Czech Republic) Leoš Friedl	6^{6}	**7^{7}**	3
2	(Argentina) **Lucas Arnold** (Argentina) **Mariano Hood**	**7^{8}**	6^{3}	**6**
