= 2002 Campionati Internazionali di Sicilia =

- Date: 23–29 September
- Edition: 24th
- Category: International Series
- Draw: 32S / 16D
- Prize money: $356,000
- Surface: Clay / outdoor
- Location: Palermo, Italy

Champions

Singles
- (Chile) Fernando González

Doubles
- (Argentina) Lucas Arnold / (Argentina) Luis Lobo
- Campionati Internazionali di Sicilia

The 2002 Campionati Internazionali di Sicilia was a men's tennis tournament played on outdoor clay courts in Palermo, Italy and was part of the International Series of the 2002 ATP Tour. It was the 24th edition of the tournament and ran from 23 September until 29 September 2002. Second-seeded Fernando González won the singles title.

== Finals ==
=== Singles ===
(Chile) Fernando González defeated (Argentina) José Acasuso 5–7, 6–3, 6–1

- It was González's 2nd singles title of the year and the 3rd of his career.

=== Doubles ===
(Argentina) Lucas Arnold / (Argentina) Luis Lobo defeated (Czech Republic) František Čermák / (Czech Republic) Leoš Friedl 6–4, 4–6, 6–2

- It was Arnold's only title of the year and the 9th of his career. It was Lobo's only title of the year and the 12th of his career.
