= 2006 Campionati Internazionali di Sicilia – Singles =

Singles
- 2006 Campionati Internazionali di Sicilia

Final
- Champion: (Italy) Filippo Volandri
- Runner-up: (Ecuador) Nicolás Lapentti
- Score: 5–7, 6–1, 6–3

Details
- Draw: 32
- Seeds: 8

Events
Singles	Doubles
- Campionati Internazionali di Sicilia

Igor Andreev was the defending champion, but did not participate.

Filippo Volandri won the title, defeating Nicolás Lapentti 5–7, 6–1, 6–3 in the final.

== Seeds ==
1. (Spain) Fernando Verdasco (quarterfinals)
2. (Italy) Filippo Volandri (champion)
3. (France) Gilles Simon (quarterfinals)
4. (Spain) Nicolás Almagro (semifinals, retired due to an ankle injury)
5. (France) Paul-Henri Mathieu (first round)
6. (Germany) Florian Mayer (withdrew due to a sore shoulder)
7. (Peru) Luis Horna (first round, retired due to a shoulder injury)
8. (Spain) Rubén Ramírez Hidalgo (semifinals)

== Draw ==
Key

- Q = Qualifier
- WC = Wild card
- LL = Lucky loser
- Alt = Alternate
- ITF = ITF entry
- PR = Protected ranking
- SR = Special ranking
- SE = Special exempt
- JE = Junior exempt
- JR = Junior Accelerator Programme entrant
- CO = College Accelerator Programme entrant
- NG = Next Gen Accelerator Program entrant
- w/o = Walkover
- r = Retired
- d = Defaulted

=== Finals ===
Semifinals
8	(Spain) Rubén Ramírez Hidalgo	2	1
(Ecuador) Nicolás Lapentti	6	6
4	(Spain) Nicolás Almagro	0	1^{r}
2	(Italy) Filippo Volandri	6	2

Final
(Ecuador) Nicolás Lapentti	7	1	3
2	(Italy) Filippo Volandri	5	6	6

=== Top half ===
First round
1	(Spain) F Verdasco	5	6	6
(Italy) D Bracciali	7	4	4
(Czech Republic) J Hájek	6	7^{7}
PR	(Czech Republic) B Ulihrach	3	6^{2}
WC	(Italy) G Naso	1
(Czech Republic) J Vaněk	2^{r}
(Italy) A di Mauro	6^{7}	3
8	(Spain) R Ramírez Hidalgo	7^{9}	6
3	(France) G Simon	6	6^{6}	6
(Italy) A Seppi	0	7^{8}	2
PR	(Argentina) M Zabaleta	7	3	6
(France) O Patience	5	6	3
Q	(Costa Rica) JA Marín	6^{3}	3
WC	(Italy) F Fognini	7^{7}	6
(Ecuador) N Lapentti	3	6	6
5	(France) P-H Mathieu	6	2	3

Second round
1	(Spain) F Verdasco	6	6
(Czech Republic) J Hájek	2	2
WC	(Italy) G Naso	2	2
8	(Spain) R Ramírez Hidalgo	6	6
3	(France) G Simon	7	6
PR	(Argentina) M Zabaleta	5	3
WC	(Italy) F Fognini	6	1	6^{4}
(Ecuador) N Lapentti	2	6	7^{7}

Quarterfinals
1	(Spain) F Verdasco	3	4
8	(Spain) R Ramírez Hidalgo	6	6
3	(France) G Simon	0	1
(Ecuador) N Lapentti	6	6

Semifinals
8	(Spain) R Ramírez Hidalgo	2	1
(Ecuador) N Lapentti	6	6

=== Bottom half ===
First round
LL	(Spain) Ó Hernández	6	6
(Germany) P Kohlschreiber	1	1
(Argentina) M Vassallo Argüello	2	6	7
Q	(Argentina) J-P Guzmán	6	3	5
Q	(Czech Republic) F Čermák	6	2	7
(Romania) A Pavel	3	6	5
(Austria) O Marach	1	4
4	(Spain) N Almagro	6	6
7	(Peru) L Horna	2^{r}
(Spain) A Montañés	5
(Italy) P Starace	6	6
Q	(Italy) F Luzzi	1	2
(Argentina) S Roitman	6	6
WC	(Italy) F Aldi	0	1
(Spain) G García López	6^{3}	6	3
2	(Italy) F Volandri	7^{7}	3	6

Second round
LL	(Spain) Ó Hernández	6	4	4
(Argentina) M Vassallo Argüello	2	6	6
Q	(Czech Republic) F Čermák	1	2
4	(Spain) N Almagro	6	6
(Spain) A Montañés	6	6
(Italy) P Starace	2	2
(Argentina) S Roitman	7^{8}	1	4
2	(Italy) F Volandri	6^{6}	6	6

Quarterfinals
(Argentina) M Vassallo Argüello	2	2
4	(Spain) N Almagro	6	6
(Spain) A Montañés	4	2
2	(Italy) F Volandri	6	6

Semifinals
4	(Spain) N Almagro	0	1^{r}
2	(Italy) F Volandri	6	2
