= 2012 Mutua Madrid Open – Men's singles =

Men's singles
- 2012 Mutua Madrid Open

Final
- Champion: (Switzerland) Roger Federer
- Runner-up: (Czech Republic) Tomáš Berdych
- Score: 3–6, 7–5, 7–5

Events
Singles	men	women
Doubles	men	women
← 2011 ·	Mutua Madrid Open	· 2013 →

Roger Federer defeated Tomáš Berdych in the final, 3–6, 7–5, 7–5 to win the men's singles tennis title at the 2012 Madrid Open. With the win, Federer won his record-tying 20th Masters title and third title at Madrid.

Novak Djokovic was the defending champion, but lost to Janko Tipsarević in the quarterfinals.

This was the first and only edition of the tournament to be held on blue clay courts.

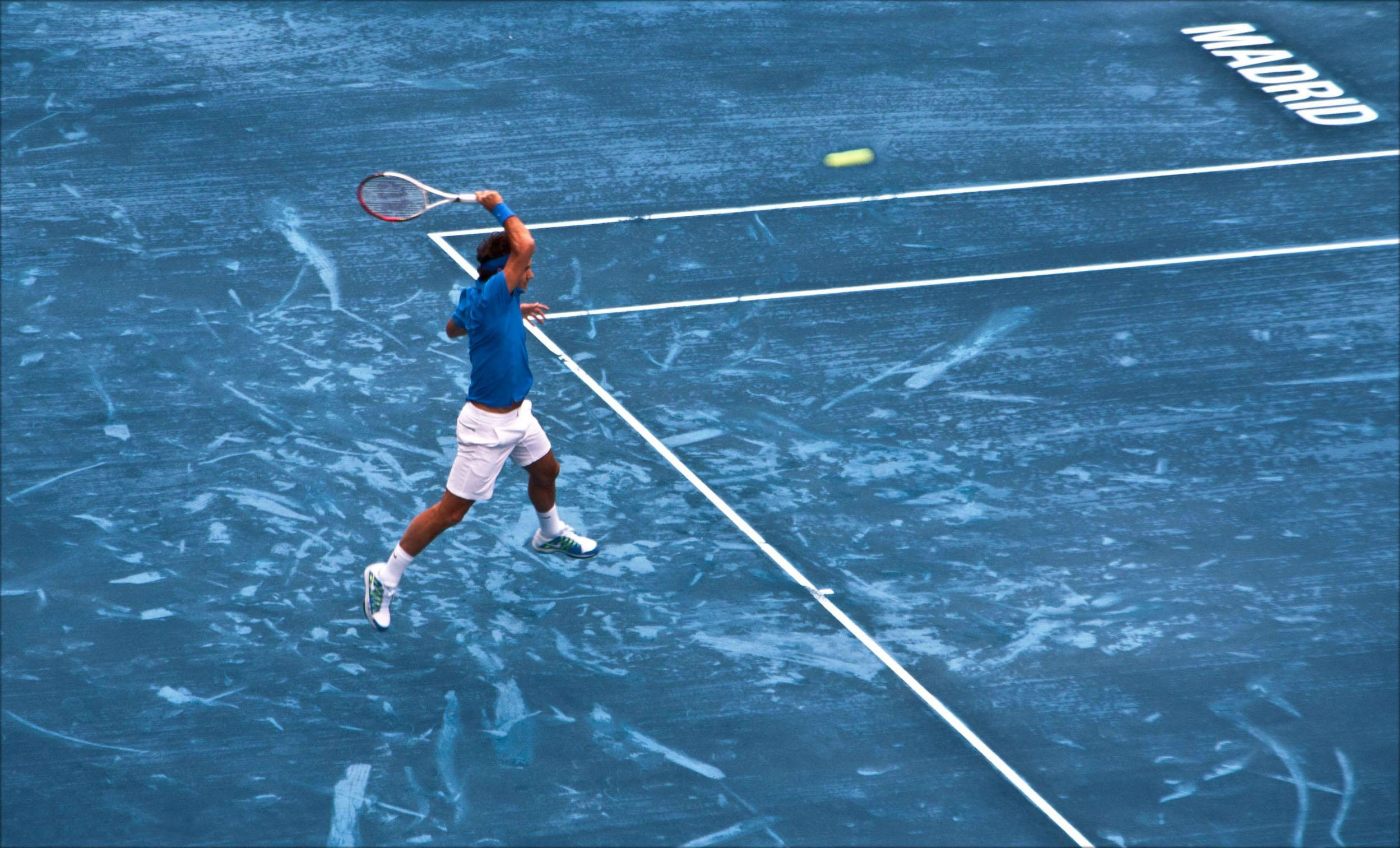
Federer became the first and currently only men's singles player to win a tournament on blue clay.

== Seeds ==
The top eight seeds receive a bye into the second round.

1. (Serbia) Novak Djokovic (quarterfinals)
2. (Spain) Rafael Nadal (third round)
3. (Switzerland) Roger Federer (champion)
4. (France) Jo-Wilfried Tsonga (third round)
5. (Spain) David Ferrer (quarterfinals)
6. (Czech Republic) Tomáš Berdych (final)
7. (Serbia) Janko Tipsarević (semifinals)
8. (United States) John Isner (second round)
9. (France) Gilles Simon (third round)
10. (Argentina) Juan Martín del Potro (semifinals)
11. (Spain) Nicolás Almagro (third round)
12. (France) Gaël Monfils (third round)
13. (Spain) Feliciano López (first round)
14. (France) Richard Gasquet (third round)
15. (Spain) Fernando Verdasco (quarterfinals)
16. (Ukraine) Alexandr Dolgopolov (quarterfinals)

== Draw ==
=== Key ===
- Q = Qualifier
- WC = Wild card
- LL = Lucky loser
- Alt = Alternate
- SE = Special exempt
- PR = Protected ranking
- ITF = ITF entry
- JE = Junior exempt
- w/o = Walkover
- r = Retired
- d = Defaulted
- SR = Special ranking

=== Finals ===
Quarterfinals
1	(Serbia) Novak Djokovic	6^{2}	3
7	(Serbia) Janko Tipsarević	7^{7}	6
3	(Switzerland) Roger Federer	6	6
5	(Spain) David Ferrer	4	4
10	(Argentina) Juan Martín del Potro	6	6
16	(Ukraine) Alexandr Dolgopolov	3	4
6	(Czech Republic) Tomáš Berdych	6	6
15	(Spain) Fernando Verdasco	1	2

Semifinals
7	(Serbia) Janko Tipsarević	2	3
3	(Switzerland) Roger Federer	6	6
10	(Argentina) Juan Martín del Potro	6^{5}	6^{6}
6	(Czech Republic) Tomáš Berdych	7^{7}	7^{8}

Final
3	(Switzerland) Roger Federer	3	7	7
6	(Czech Republic) Tomáš Berdych	6	5	5

=== Top half ===
==== Section 1 ====
First round
Q	(Spain) D Gimeno Traver	7^{7}	4	6
Q	(Romania) V Hănescu	6^{3}	6	3
(Belgium) O Rochus	4	6^{4}
(Switzerland) S Wawrinka	6	7^{7}
(Austria) J Melzer	3	7^{8}	6
13	(Spain) F López	6	6^{6}	4
9	(France) G Simon	6^{1}	6	6
(Italy) F Fognini	7^{7}	3	3
(Cyprus) M Baghdatis	4	6	4
WC	(Spain) G García López	6	3	6
(Spain) A Ramos	3	2
Q	(Argentina) F Delbonis	6	6

Second round
1	(Serbia) N Djokovic	6	2	6
Q	(Spain) D Gimeno Traver	2	6	3
(Switzerland) S Wawrinka	6	6
(Austria) J Melzer	1	4
9	(France) G Simon	6	6
WC	(Spain) G García López	4	3
Q	(Argentina) F Delbonis	6^{5}	7^{8}	3
7	(Serbia) J Tipsarević	7^{7}	6^{6}	6

Third round
1	(Serbia) N Djokovic	7^{7}	6
(Switzerland) S Wawrinka	6^{5}	4
9	(France) G Simon	6^{3}	7	1
7	(Serbia) J Tipsarević	7^{7}	5	6

Quarterfinals
1	(Serbia) N Djokovic	6^{2}	3
7	(Serbia) J Tipsarević	7^{7}	6

==== Section 2 ====
First round
(Canada) M Raonic	6	6
(Argentina) D Nalbandian	4	4
(Serbia) V Troicki	6	4	6
(United States) D Young	1	6	1
(Brazil) T Bellucci	6	4	6^{5}
14	(France) R Gasquet	4	6	7^{7}
11	(Spain) N Almagro	6^{5}	6	6
Q	(Colombia) S Giraldo	7^{7}	3	3
(Spain) M Granollers	7	3	7
(Argentina) C Berlocq	5	6	5
(Czech Republic) R Štěpánek	6	7
(Australia) B Tomic	2	5

Second round
3	(Switzerland) R Federer	4	7	7^{7}
(Canada) M Raonic	6	5	6^{4}
(Serbia) V Troicki	5	3
14	(France) R Gasquet	7	6
11	(Spain) N Almagro	6	7^{7}
(Spain) M Granollers	3	6^{3}
(Czech Republic) R Štěpánek	6^{4}	2
5	(Spain) D Ferrer	7^{7}	6

Third round
3	(Switzerland) R Federer	6	6
14	(France) R Gasquet	3	2
11	(Spain) N Almagro	6^{5}	6	6^{8}
5	(Spain) D Ferrer	7^{7}	3	7^{10}

Quarterfinals
3	(Switzerland) R Federer	6	6
5	(Spain) D Ferrer	4	4

=== Bottom half ===
==== Section 3 ====
First round
WC	(Spain) A Montañés	3	3
(Croatia) M Čilić	6	6
(Russia) M Youzhny	6	6
WC	(Spain) J Martí	3	2
(Germany) F Mayer	4	2
10	(Argentina) JM del Potro	6	6
16	(Ukraine) A Dolgopolov	7^{7}	6
(Spain) P Andújar	6^{5}	4
(France) M Llodra	5	4
(Italy) A Seppi	7	6
Q	(Ukraine) S Stakhovsky	6^{3}	6^{5}
WC	(United States) R Harrison	7^{7}	7^{7}

Second round
8	(United States) J Isner	6^{4}	6^{3}
(Croatia) M Čilić	7^{7}	7^{7}
(Russia) M Youzhny	4	6^{1}
10	(Argentina) JM del Potro	6	7^{7}
16	(Ukraine) A Dolgopolov	6^{5}	7^{7}	6
(Italy) A Seppi	7^{7}	6^{5}	3
WC	(United States) R Harrison	2	6^{4}
4	(France) J-W Tsonga	6	7^{7}

Third round
(Croatia) M Čilić	2	4
10	(Argentina) JM del Potro	6	6
16	(Ukraine) A Dolgopolov	7	3	7^{7}
4	(France) J-W Tsonga	5	6	6^{2}

Quarterfinals
10	(Argentina) JM del Potro	6	6
16	(Ukraine) A Dolgopolov	3	4

==== Section 4 ====
First round
(South Africa) K Anderson	6	6
(Russia) A Bogomolov Jr.	3	2
Q	(Russia) I Andreev	6	7^{7}
(Spain) JC Ferrero	4	6^{4}
(Germany) P Kohlschreiber	5	7^{7}	3
12	(France) G Monfils	7	6^{2}	6
15	(Spain) F Verdasco	7	6
(Uzbekistan) D Istomin	5	2
Q	(Colombia) A Falla	6	2	6
(Argentina) JI Chela	3	6	2
(Croatia) I Karlović	6^{4}	3
(Russia) N Davydenko	7^{7}	6

Second round
6	(Czech Republic) T Berdych	6	6
(South Africa) K Anderson	4	3
Q	(Russia) I Andreev	3	0^{r}
12	(France) G Monfils	6	1
15	(Spain) F Verdasco	6^{4}	6	6
Q	(Colombia) A Falla	7^{7}	4	4
(Russia) N Davydenko	2	2
2	(Spain) R Nadal	6	6

Third round
6	(Czech Republic) T Berdych	6	6
12	(France) G Monfils	1	1
15	(Spain) F Verdasco	6	3	7
2	(Spain) R Nadal	3	6	5

Quarterfinals
6	(Czech Republic) T Berdych	6	6
15	(Spain) F Verdasco	1	2

== Qualifying ==
=== Seeds ===
1. (Colombia) Santiago Giraldo (qualified)
2. (Colombia) Alejandro Falla (qualified)
3. (Ukraine) Sergiy Stakhovsky (qualified)
4. (Italy) Flavio Cipolla (qualifying competition)
5. (Australia) Matthew Ebden (first round)
6. (Italy) Potito Starace (first round, retired)
7. (Russia) Igor Andreev (qualified)
8. (France) Édouard Roger-Vasselin (qualifying competition)
9. (Germany) Björn Phau (first round)
10. (Germany) Philipp Petzschner (first round)
11. (Romania) Adrian Ungur (first round)
12. (Canada) Vasek Pospisil (first round)
13. (Romania) Victor Hănescu (qualified)
14. (Spain) Daniel Gimeno Traver (qualified)

=== Qualifiers ===
1. (Colombia) Santiago Giraldo
2. (Colombia) Alejandro Falla
3. (Ukraine) Sergiy Stakhovsky
4. (Romania) Victor Hănescu
5. (Spain) Daniel Gimeno Traver
6. (Argentina) Federico Delbonis
7. (Russia) Igor Andreev

=== Qualifying draw ===
==== First qualifier ====
First round
1	(Colombia) Santiago Giraldo	7^{8}	6
WC	(Romania) Marius Copil	6^{6}	1
(Spain) Daniel Muñoz de la Nava	6	6
10	(Germany) Philipp Petzschner	3	2

Qualifying competition
1	(Colombia) Santiago Giraldo	1	6	6
(Spain) Daniel Muñoz de la Nava	6	4	2

==== Second qualifier ====
First round
2	(Colombia) Alejandro Falla	6	6
WC	(Spain) Hasier Pastor	2	2
(Spain) Íñigo Cervantes-Huegun	6	3	7^{7}
11	(Romania) Adrian Ungur	3	6	6^{5}

Qualifying competition
2	(Colombia) Alejandro Falla	6	7^{7}
(Spain) Íñigo Cervantes-Huegun	3	6^{3}

==== Third qualifier ====
First round
3	(Ukraine) Sergiy Stakhovsky	4	6	6
WC	(Spain) Iván Navarro	6	4	1
(Germany) Peter Torebko	6^{2}	2
8	(France) Édouard Roger-Vasselin	7^{7}	6

Qualifying competition
3	(Ukraine) Sergiy Stakhovsky	6	4	7
8	(France) Édouard Roger-Vasselin	2	6	5

==== Fourth qualifier ====
First round
4	(Italy) Flavio Cipolla	6	7
(France) Éric Prodon	4	5
(Argentina) Eduardo Schwank	3	2
13	(Romania) Victor Hănescu	6	6

Qualifying competition
4	(Italy) Flavio Cipolla	3	6	5
13	(Romania) Victor Hănescu	6	3	7

==== Fifth qualifier ====
First round
5	(Australia) Matthew Ebden	2	6^{3}
(Portugal) Frederico Gil	6	7^{7}
(France) Arnaud Clément	0	1
14	(Spain) Daniel Gimeno Traver	6	6

Qualifying competition
(Portugal) Frederico Gil	5	4
14	(Spain) Daniel Gimeno Traver	7	6

==== Sixth qualifier ====
First round
6	(Italy) Potito Starace	5^{r}
WC	(Spain) Adam Sanjurjo Hermida	4
(Argentina) Federico Delbonis	7	7^{8}
12	(Canada) Vasek Pospisil	5	6^{6}

Qualifying competition
WC	(Spain) Adam Sanjurjo Hermida	2	2
(Argentina) Federico Delbonis	6	6

==== Seventh qualifier ====
First round
7	(Russia) Igor Andreev	6	6
(Germany) Michael Berrer	2	2
(Spain) Roberto Bautista Agut	7^{8}	7^{8}
9	(Germany) Björn Phau	6^{6}	6^{6}

Qualifying competition
7	(Russia) Igor Andreev	3	6	6
(Spain) Roberto Bautista Agut	6	3	4
