= 2004 Campionati Internazionali di Sicilia – Singles =

Tennis tournament

Singles
- 2004 Campionati Internazionali di Sicilia

Final
- Champion: (Czech Republic) Tomáš Berdych
- Runner-up: (Italy) Filippo Volandri
- Score: 6–3, 6–3

Details
- Draw: 32 (3WC/4Q/1LL)
- Seeds: 8

Events
Singles	Doubles
← 2003 ·	Campionati Internazionali di Sicilia	· 2005 →

Nicolás Massú was the defending champion, but lost in the quarterfinals to Filippo Volandri.

Tomáš Berdych won the title by defeating Volandri 6–3, 6–3 in the final.

== Seeds ==
1. (Chile) Nicolás Massú (quarterfinals)
2. (Austria) ~~Florian Mayer~~ (withdrew due to an arm injury)
3. (Spain) Fernando Verdasco (second round)
4. (Russia) Nikolay Davydenko (quarterfinals)
5. (Italy) Filippo Volandri (final)
6. (Spain) Rafael Nadal (second round)
7. (Spain) David Ferrer (semifinals)
8. (Czechoslovakia) Tomáš Berdych (champion)

== Draw ==
=== Key ===
- Q = Qualifier
- WC = Wild card
- LL = Lucky loser
- Alt = Alternate
- SE = Special exempt
- PR = Protected ranking
- ITF = ITF entry
- JE = Junior exempt
- w/o = Walkover
- r = Retired
- d = Defaulted
- SR = Special ranking

=== Finals ===
Semifinals
5	(Italy) Filippo Volandri	6	6
(Argentina) Juan Mónaco	1	4
7	(Spain) David Ferrer	5	4
8	(Czech Republic) Tomáš Berdych	7	6

Final
5	(Italy) Filippo Volandri	3	3
8	(Czech Republic) Tomáš Berdych	6	6

=== Top half ===
First round
1	(Chile) N Massú	6	6
(Spain) D Sánchez	3	2
(Italy) P Starace	7^{8}	4	6
(France) R Gasquet	6^{6}	6	1
Q	(Spain) G Blanco	2	6	6
Q	(Italy) A di Mauro	6	2	2
(Spain) A Montañés	2	3
5	(Italy) F Volandri	6	6
3	(Spain) F Verdasco	6	4	6
WC	(Italy) F Aldi	2	6	2
(Argentina) J Mónaco	3	6
(Germany) P Kohlschreiber	6	4^{r}
(France) O Mutis	6	6
(France) O Patience	4	3
Q	(Spain) N Almagro	1	5
6/WC	(Spain) R Nadal	6	7

Second round
1	(Chile) N Massú	4
(Italy) P Starace	1^{r}
Q	(Spain) G Blanco	2	1
5	(Italy) F Volandri	6	6
3	(Spain) F Verdasco	4	7	3
(Argentina) J Mónaco	6	5	6
(France) O Mutis	6	6
6/WC	(Spain) R Nadal	3	3

Quarterfinals
1	(Chile) N Massú	3	6	4
5	(Italy) F Volandri	6	3	6
(Argentina) J Mónaco	6	6
(France) O Mutis	3	2

Semifinals
5	(Italy) F Volandri	6	6
(Argentina) J Mónaco	1	4

=== Bottom half ===
First round
7	(Spain) D Ferrer	2	6	6
(Spain) A Martín	6	1	4
(Germany) D Elsner	1	0
(Spain) Á Calatrava	6	6
(Spain) M López	6	6
LL	(Spain) D Gimeno Traver	2	2
(Romania) V Hănescu	2	5
4	(Russia) N Davydenko	6	7
8	(Czech Republic) T Berdych	6^{5}	6	6
(Spain) Ó Hernández	7^{7}	3	3
(Argentina) J Acasuso	6	6
(Colombia) A Falla	3	1
WC	(Italy) A Seppi	6^{2}	6	6
(France) A Di Pasquale	7^{7}	2	4
(Belgium) K Vliegen	6	6
Q	(Argentina) M Puerta	1	2

Second round
7	(Spain) D Ferrer	3	7^{7}	6
(Spain) Á Calatrava	6	6^{2}	2
(Spain) M López	1	4
4	(Russia) N Davydenko	6	6
8	(Czech Republic) T Berdych	4	7	6
(Argentina) J Acasuso	6	5	4
WC	(Italy) A Seppi	6	3	4
(Belgium) K Vliegen	4	6	1^{r}

Quarterfinals
7	(Spain) D Ferrer	6	2	6
4	(Russia) N Davydenko	2	6	4
8	(Czech Republic) T Berdych	6	6
WC	(Italy) A Seppi	2	4

Semifinals
7	(Spain) D Ferrer	5	4
8	(Czech Republic) T Berdych	7	6
