= 2003 Campionati Internazionali di Sicilia =

- Date: 22–28 September
- Edition: 25th
- Category: International Series
- Draw: 32S / 16D
- Prize money: $355,500
- Surface: Clay / outdoor
- Location: Palermo, Italy

Champions

Singles
- (Chile) Nicolás Massú

Doubles
- (Argentina) Lucas Arnold / (Argentina) Mariano Hood
- Campionati Internazionali di Sicilia

The 2003 Campionati Internazionali di Sicilia was a men's tennis tournament played on outdoor clay courts in Palermo, Italy and was part of the International Series of the 2003 ATP Tour. It was the 25th edition of the tournament and was held from 22 September until 28 September 2003. First-seeded Nicolás Massú won the singles title.

== Finals ==
=== Singles ===
(Chile) Nicolás Massú defeated (France) Paul-Henri Mathieu 1–6, 6–2, 7–6^{(7–0)}

- It was Massú's 2nd singles title of the year and the 3rd of his career.

=== Doubles ===
(Argentina) Lucas Arnold / (Argentina) Mariano Hood defeated (Czech Republic) František Čermák / (Czech Republic) Leoš Friedl 7–6^{(8–6)}, 6–7^{(3–7)}, 6–3

- It was Arnold's 2nd title of the year and the 11th of his career. It was Hood's 4th title of the year and the 8th of his career.
