= 2002 Campionati Internazionali di Sicilia – Singles =

Singles
- 2002 Campionati Internazionali di Sicilia

Final
- Champion: (Chile) Fernando González
- Runner-up: (Argentina) José Acasuso
- Score: 5–7, 6–3, 6–1

Details
- Draw: 32
- Seeds: 8

Events
Singles	Doubles
- Campionati Internazionali di Sicilia

Félix Mantilla was the defending champion but did not compete that year.

Fernando González won in the final 5–7, 6–3, 6–1 against José Acasuso.

== Seeds ==
A champion seed is indicated in bold text while text in italics indicates the round in which that seed was eliminated.

1. (Chile) Marcelo Ríos (semifinals)
2. (Chile) **Fernando González (champion)**
3. (Argentina) José Acasuso (final)
4. (Spain) Fernando Vicente (first round)
5. (Spain) David Ferrer (second round)
6. (Spain) David Sánchez (quarterfinals)
7. (Spain) Alberto Martín (quarterfinals)
8. n/a

== Draw ==
Key

- Q = Qualifier
- WC = Wild card
- LL = Lucky loser
- Alt = Alternate
- ITF = ITF entry
- PR = Protected ranking
- SR = Special ranking
- SE = Special exempt
- JE = Junior exempt
- JR = Junior Accelerator Programme entrant
- CO = College Accelerator Programme entrant
- NG = Next Gen Accelerator Program entrant
- w/o = Walkover
- r = Retired
- d = Defaulted

First round
WC/1	(Chile) **M Ríos**	**6**	**6**
LL	(Spain) R Ramírez Hidalgo	2	4
Q	(Germany) O Gross	5	**6**	5
(Hungary) **A Sávolt**	**7**	0	**7**
(France) P-H Mathieu	2	2
(Austria) **J Melzer**	**6**	**6**
WC	(France) R Gasquet	2	0	r
6	(Spain) **D Sánchez**	**6**	**2**
3	(Argentina) **J Acasuso**	**6**	**6**
(Sweden) A Vinciguerra	3	4
(France) **N Coutelot**	**6**	3	**6**
(Spain) A Portas	2	**6**	4
(Peru) **L Horna**	**6**	4	**6**
Q	(Germany) M Craca	4	**6**	1
(Georgia (country)) I Labadze	4	**6**	1
5	(Spain) **D Ferrer**	**6**	4	**6**
Q	(Italy) F Volandri	**6**	6^{5}	1
(Armenia) **S Sargsian**	4	**7^{7}**	**6**
Q	(Costa Rica) **J A Marín**	**7^{7}**	**6**
(Italy) S Galvani	6^{4}	4
(Brazil) **F Meligeni**	**6**	5	**6**
(Czech Republic) J Vaněk	2	**7**	2
(Czech Republic) **B Ulihrach**	**6**	**6**
4	(Spain) F Vicente	1	2
7	(Spain) **A Martín**	**6**	**4**
(Russia) N Davydenko	4	2	r
(Belgium) C Rochus	0	1
(Argentina) **F Squillari**	**6**	**6**
WC	(Italy) A Gaudenzi	2	2
(Spain) **A Montañés**	**6**	**6**
(Croatia) Ž Krajan	3	2
2	(Chile) **F González**	**6**	**6**

Second round
WC/1	(Chile) **M Ríos**	**6**	**6**
(Hungary) A Sávolt	1	2
(Austria) J Melzer	**6**	1	1
6	(Spain) **D Sánchez**	3	**6**	**6**
3	(Argentina) **J Acasuso**	**6**	**7^{7}**
(France) N Coutelot	4	6^{5}
(Peru) **L Horna**	**6**	**6**
5	(Spain) D Ferrer	1	2
(Armenia) **S Sargsian**	**6**	**7^{7}**
Q	(Costa Rica) J A Marín	2	6^{4}
(Brazil) F Meligeni	5	3
(Czech Republic) **B Ulihrach**	**7**	**6**
7	(Spain) **A Martín**	**6**	**7**
(Argentina) F Squillari	1	5
(Spain) A Montañés	4	4
2	(Chile) **F González**	**6**	**6**

Quarterfinals
WC/1	(Chile) **M Ríos**	**7**	4	**7^{9}**
6	(Spain) D Sánchez	5	**6**	6^{7}
3	(Argentina) **J Acasuso**	**7**	**6**
(Peru) L Horna	5	0
(Armenia) S Sargsian	5	**6**	4
(Czech Republic) **B Ulihrach**	**7**	1	**6**
7	(Spain) A Martín	2	5
2	(Chile) **F González**	**6**	**7**

Semifinals
WC/1	(Chile) M Ríos	4	4
3	(Argentina) **J Acasuso**	**6**	**6**
(Czech Republic) B Ulihrach	1	2
2	(Chile) **F González**	**6**	**6**

Final
3	(Argentina) José Acasuso	**7**	3	1
2	(Chile) **F González**	5	**6**	**6**
