= 2006 Campionati Internazionali di Sicilia =

- Date: 25 September – 1 October
- Edition: 28th
- Category: International Series
- Draw: 32S / 16D
- Prize money: €323,250
- Surface: Clay / outdoor
- Location: Palermo, Italy

Champions

Singles
- (Italy) Filippo Volandri

Doubles
- (Argentina) Martín García / (Peru) Luis Horna
- Campionati Internazionali di Sicilia

The 2006 Campionati Internazionali di Sicilia was a men's tennis tournaments played on outdoor clay courts in Palermo, Italy that was part of the International Series of the 2006 ATP Tour. It was the 28th edition of the tournament and was held from 25 September through 1 October 2006. Second-seeded Filippo Volandri won the singles title.

== Finals ==
=== Singles ===
(Italy) Filippo Volandri defeated (Ecuador) Nicolás Lapentti 5–7, 6–1, 6–3

- It was Volandri's 1st title of the year and the 2nd of his career.

=== Doubles ===
(Argentina) Martín García / (Peru) Luis Horna defeated (Poland) Mariusz Fyrstenberg / (Poland) Marcin Matkowski 7–6^{(7–1)}, 7–6^{(7–2)}

- It was García's 1st title of the year and the 6th of his career. It was Horna's 1st title of the year and the 2nd of his career.
