= 2005 Campionati Internazionali di Sicilia – Doubles =

Doubles
- 2005 Campionati Internazionali di Sicilia

Final
- Champions: (Argentina) Martín García (Argentina) Mariano Hood
- Runners-up: (Poland) Mariusz Fyrstenberg (Poland) Marcin Matkowski
- Score: 6–2, 6–3

Details
- Draw: 16 (2WC/1Alt)
- Seeds: 4

Events
Singles	Doubles
- Campionati Internazionali di Sicilia

Lucas Arnold Ker and Mariano Hood were the defending champions, but Arnold Ker did not compete this year.

Hood teamed up with Martín García and successfully defended his title, by defeating Mariusz Fyrstenberg and Marcin Matkowski 6–2, 6–3 in the final.

== Seeds ==
1. (Czech Republic) František Čermák / (Czech Republic) Leoš Friedl (first round)
2. (Czech Republic) Cyril Suk / (Czech Republic) Pavel Vízner (first round)
3. (Argentina) Martín García / (Argentina) Mariano Hood (champions)
4. (Austria) Julian Knowle / (Germany) Michael Kohlmann (first round)

== Draw ==
Key

- Q = Qualifier
- WC = Wild card
- LL = Lucky loser
- Alt = Alternate
- ITF = ITF entry
- PR = Protected ranking
- SR = Special ranking
- SE = Special exempt
- JE = Junior exempt
- JR = Junior Accelerator Programme entrant
- CO = College Accelerator Programme entrant
- NG = Next Gen Accelerator Program entrant
- w/o = Walkover
- r = Retired
- d = Defaulted

=== Draw ===
First round
1	(Czech Republic) F Čermák (Czech Republic) L Friedl	6	5^{1}	3
(Poland) M Fyrstenberg (Poland) M Matkowski	4	6^{7}	6
(Romania) R Sabău (Czech Republic) D Škoch	6	1	6
(Czech Republic) P Pála (Czech Republic) T Zíb	2	6	2
4	(Austria) J Knowle (Germany) M Kohlmann	2	3
(Argentina) JI Chela (Argentina) S Prieto	6	6
(Italy) D Bracciali (Italy) G Galimberti	6	6
(Spain) N Almagro (Spain) A Martín	3	4
(Spain) Ó Hernández (Spain) A López Morón	6^{7}	2	5^{5}
WC	(Italy) S Bolelli (Italy) D Sanguinetti	5^{5}	6	6^{7}
WC	(Czech Republic) T Berdych (Czech Republic) M Navratil
3	(Argentina) M García (Argentina) M Hood	w/o
(Spain) F Verdasco (Spain) F Vicente	6	6
(Belgium) C Rochus (Belgium) T Vanhoudt	1	4
Alt	(Czech Republic) J Hájek (Czech Republic) J Pospíšil	4	6^{7}	6
2	(Czech Republic) C Suk (Czech Republic) P Vízner	6	5^{1}	3

Quarterfinals
(Poland) M Fyrstenberg (Poland) M Matkowski	6	4	6
(Romania) R Sabău (Czech Republic) D Škoch	3	6	4
(Argentina) JI Chela (Argentina) S Prieto	5^{5}	4
(Italy) D Bracciali (Italy) G Galimberti	6^{7}	6
WC	(Italy) S Bolelli (Italy) D Sanguinetti	6^{7}	4	4
3	(Argentina) M García (Argentina) M Hood	5^{3}	6	6
(Spain) F Verdasco (Spain) F Vicente
Alt	(Czech Republic) J Hájek (Czech Republic) J Pospíšil	w/o

Semifinals
(Poland) M Fyrstenberg (Poland) M Matkowski	5^{5}	6	6
(Italy) D Bracciali (Italy) G Galimberti	6^{7}	4	2
3	(Argentina) M García (Argentina) M Hood	6	6
Alt	(Czech Republic) J Hájek (Czech Republic) J Pospíšil	1	1

Final
(Poland) M Fyrstenberg (Poland) M Matkowski	2	3
3	(Argentina) M García (Argentina) M Hood	6	6
