= Stella Artois Clay Court Championships =

Defunct tennis tournament
- Tour: ATP Challenger Series
- Founded: 2001
- Abolished: 2005
- Location: Budapest, Hungary
- Venue: Budaörsi Teniszcentrum
- Category: ATP Challenger Series
- Surface: Clay (red)
- Draw: 32S/32Q/16D
- Prize money: $25,000+H

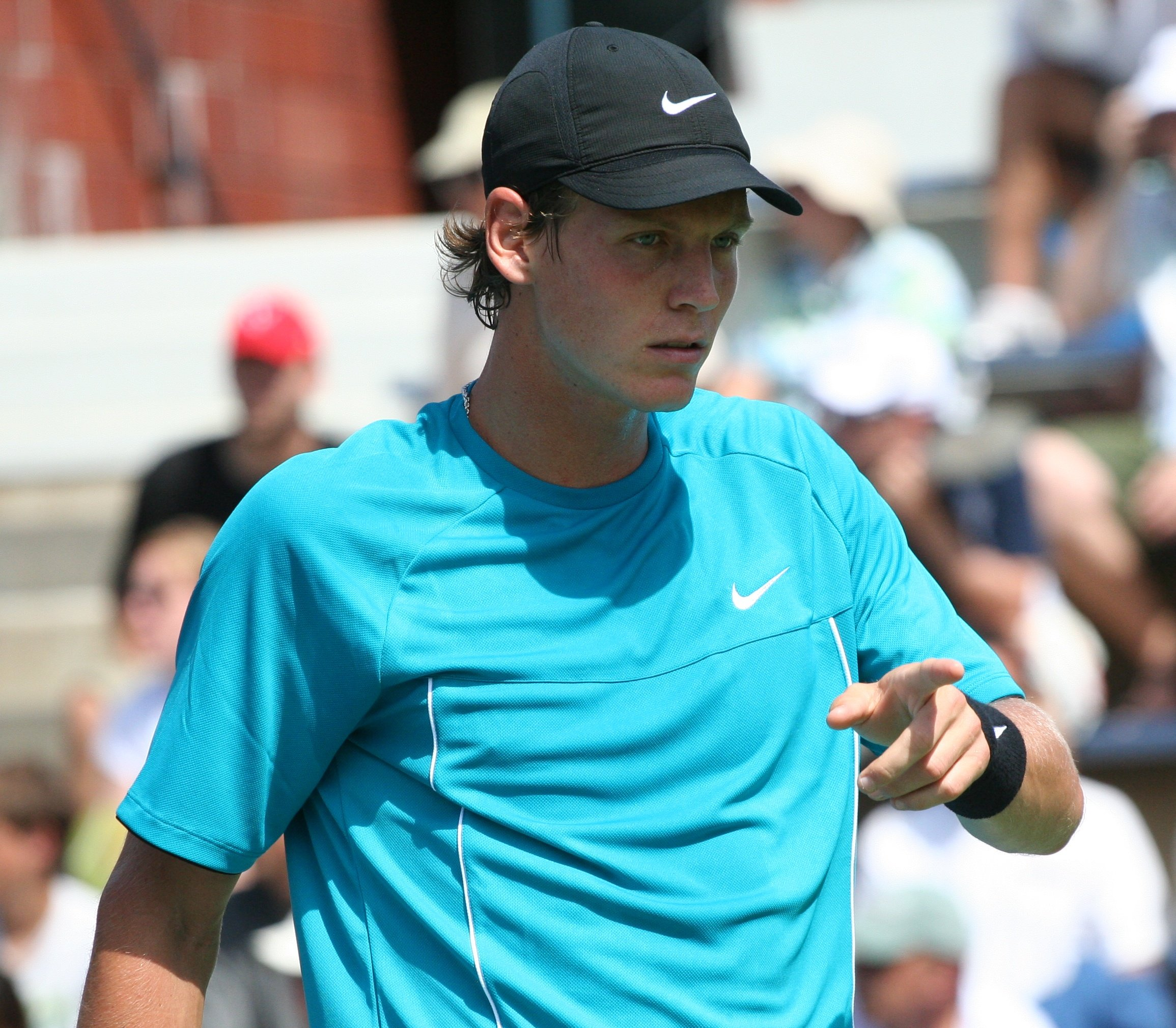
Tomáš Berdych was in the singles and doubles final in 2003

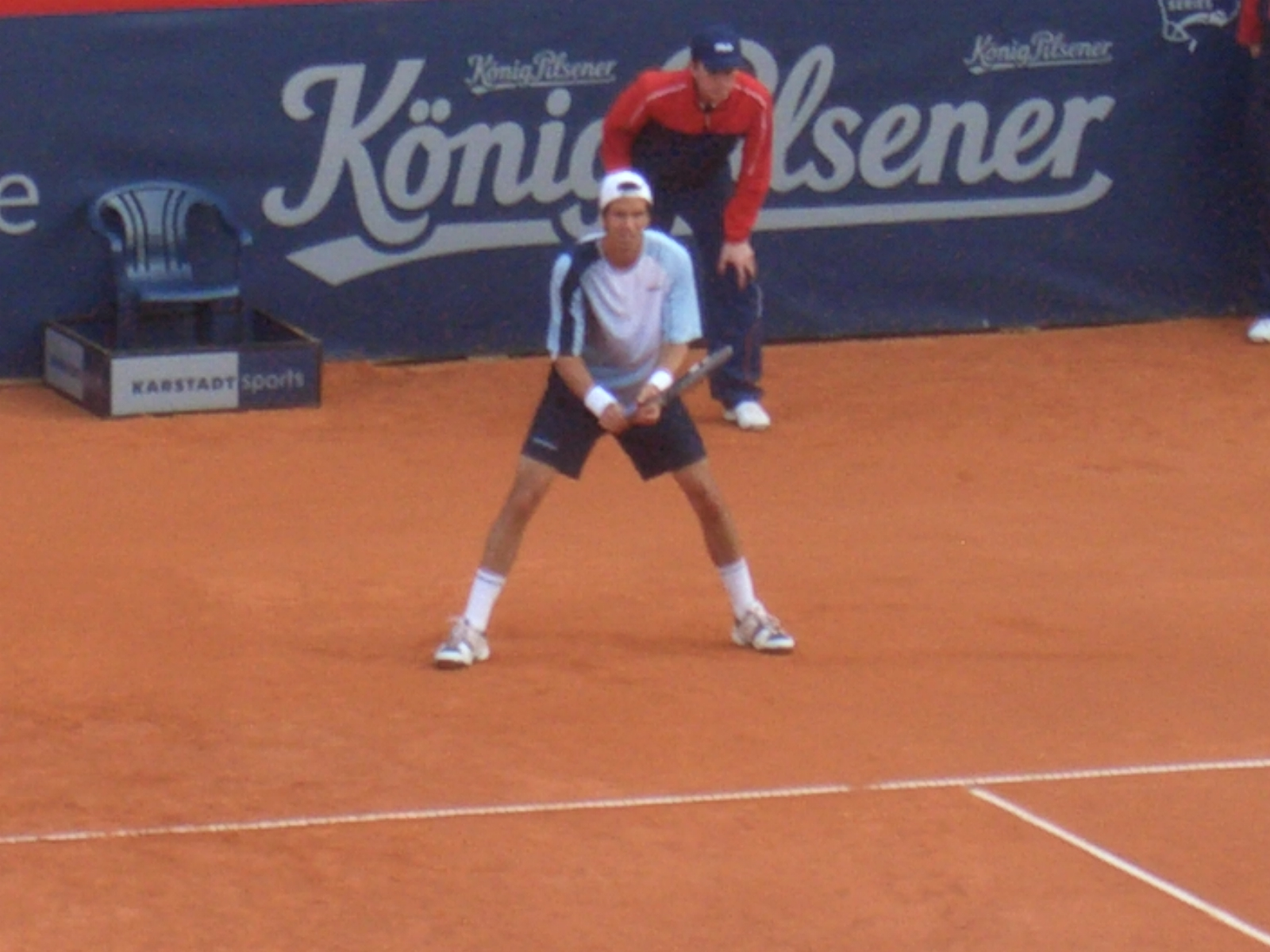
Juan Ignacio Chela won the first edition of the tournament

The Stella Artois Clay Court Championships (later shortened to Stella Artois Cup) was a professional tennis tournament played on outdoor red clay courts. During its existence, it was an annual event on the Challenger Series, the second tier of competition of the Association of Tennis Professionals (ATP). It was held each July, from 2001 through 2005, at the Budaörsi Teniszcentrum in Budapest, Hungary.

== Past finals ==
=== Singles ===
Year	Champion	Runner-up	Score
2005	(Serbia and Montenegro) Boris Pašanski	(Greece) Vasilis Mazarakis	6–3, 6–2
2004	(Argentina) Ignacio González King	(Spain) Gabriel Trujillo	6–4, 6–4
2003	(Czech Republic) Tomáš Berdych	(Bulgaria) Ivaylo Traykov	6–2, 6–3
2002	(Argentina) Diego Moyano	(Czech Republic) Jiří Vaněk	4–6, 6–3, 6–4
2001	(Argentina) Juan Ignacio Chela	(Austria) Werner Eschauer	7–5, 6–1

=== Doubles ===
Year	Champions	Runners-up	Score
2005	(Israel) Amir Hadad (Israel) Harel Levy	(Poland) Adam Chadaj (France) Stéphane Robert	6–4, 6–7^{(5–7)}, 6–3
2004	(Argentina) Ignacio González King (Spain) Gabriel Trujillo	(Czech Republic) Ota Fukárek (France) Stéphane Robert	6–4, 4–6, 7–6^{(7–3)}
2003	(Italy) Leonardo Azzaro (Hungary) Gergely Kisgyörgy	(Czech Republic) Tomáš Berdych (Czech Republic) Michal Navrátil	7–5, 4–6, 6–3
2002	(Chile) Hermes Gamonal (Chile) Adrián García	(Czech Republic) Jiří Vaněk (Czech Republic) Robin Vik	6–3, 0–6, 6–3
2001	(Czech Republic) Petr Dezort (Czech Republic) Radomír Vašek	(Argentina) Sergio Roitman (Argentina) Andrés Schneiter	6–3, 5–7, 7–6^{(7–6)}

== See also ==
- Budapest Grand Prix
- Budapest Challenger (May)
- Budapest Challenger (September)
