= Roger Federer career statistics =

Career finals
Discipline	Type	Won	Lost	Total
Singles
Singles	Grand Slam	20	11	31
Singles	ATP Finals	6	4	10
Singles	ATP 1000	28	22	50
Singles	ATP 500	24	7	31
Singles	ATP 250	25	9	34
Singles	Olympics	0	1	1
Singles	Total	103	54	157
Doubles
Doubles	Grand Slam	–	–	–
Doubles	ATP Finals	–	–	–
Doubles	ATP 1000	1	2	3
Doubles	ATP 500	3	1	4
Doubles	ATP 250	3	3	6
Doubles	Olympics	1	0	1
Doubles	Total	8	6	14

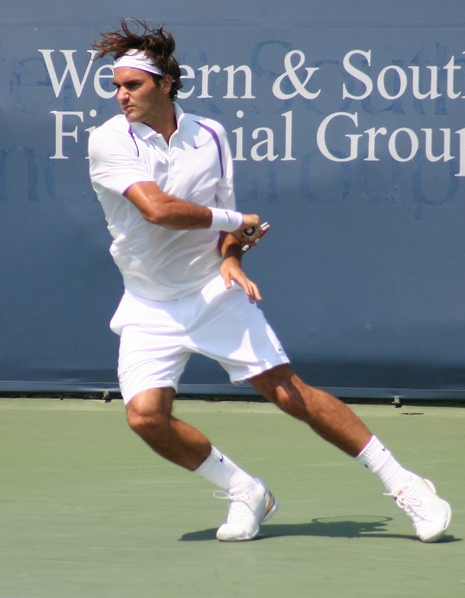
Federer was ranked world No. 1 for 310 weeks.

This is a list of the main career statistics of Swiss former professional tennis player Roger Federer. All statistics are according to the ATP Tour website. Federer won 103 ATP singles titles including 20 majors, 28 ATP Masters, and six ATP Finals. Federer was also a gold medalist in men's doubles with Stan Wawrinka at the 2008 Beijing Olympics and a silver medalist in singles at the 2012 London Olympics. Representing Switzerland, Federer participated in winning the 2014 Davis Cup and a record three Hopman Cup titles (2001, 2018 and 2019). He is the first Swiss male player to win a major title, the only Swiss male player to hold the No. 1 ranking in singles, and the only Swiss player, male or female, to win all four majors. He helped Team Europe win three consecutive Laver Cup titles, the 2017, 2018 and 2019 editions.

== Historic achievements ==
Federer won 20 Grand Slam men's singles titles, third behind Novak Djokovic (24) and Rafael Nadal (22). He was the first male player to win 15 major titles. He reached 31 major singles finals, second-most behind Djokovic (38). Federer made the finals in 10-consecutive major tournaments, from the 2005 Wimbledon tournament to the 2007 US Open. The streak ended when he lost in the semifinals of the 2008 Australian Open, though he would make the 2008 French Open final and every subsequent final through the 2010 Australian Open, 8-consecutive major finals. Federer’s 10-consecutive major finals and 8-consecutive major finals are the two longest streaks in tennis history. Federer made a record 23 consecutive semifinal appearances, and a record 36 consecutive quarterfinal appearances. He is one of eight men to have completed the Career Grand Slam (winning all four majors at least once) and the second of four players to have won the Career Grand Slam on three different surfaces, hard, grass, and clay courts, (Prior to 1978, the Grand Slam tournaments were only played on clay and grass courts) after Andre Agassi and before Nadal and Djokovic.

Federer is the only male player to win five consecutive US Open titles (2004–08) in the Open Era and in the process win 40 consecutive matches at the US Open.

Federer is the second male player to reach French Open and Wimbledon finals in the same year for four consecutive years (2006–2009), after Björn Borg (1978–81). Federer is the only male player to appear in seven consecutive Wimbledon finals (2003–2009), second behind Ivan Lendl's record of eight consecutive US Open finals (1982–1989). Federer is second male player to win 40 consecutive Wimbledon matches after Borg and in the process became the only male player to win 40 consecutive matches at two majors (Wimbledon and the US Open). Federer has won 11 hard court major titles (6 at the Australian Open and 5 at the US Open), second behind Djokovic (14).

Federer appeared in the French Open, Wimbledon and US Open finals in the same year for four consecutive years (2006–2009), surpassing the old record of Borg who achieve the same feat three times (1978, 1980–81). Federer is the only male player to appear in Wimbledon and US Open finals in the same year for 6 consecutive years (2004–2009) and won both of them in the same year for 4 consecutive years (2004–2007).

Federer is the only male player to appear in at least one Grand Slam tournament semifinal for 18 consecutive years (2003–2020). Federer was 12–2 in his first 14 Grand Slam tournament finals (2003 Wimbledon to 2007 US Open), with losses in the 2006 and 2007 French Open finals. Federer's 2005 season of 81–4 is third in the Open Era to John McEnroe's 1984 season 82–3 and Jimmy Connors 1974 season 94–4.

Federer has won eight Wimbledon titles, an all-time men's record, surpassing the seven Wimbledon titles won by William Renshaw and Pete Sampras. He is the only male player in history to reach 12 Wimbledon singles finals, and one of only two players to have done this at any Grand Slam event, second to Nadal who reached 14 French Open finals. He is the only player to win three different Grand Slam tournaments at least five times (six Australian Open, eight Wimbledon, and five US Open titles) and is the only player to win two different Grand Slam tournaments five consecutive times, at Wimbledon from 2003 to 2007 and the US Open from 2004 to 2008.

Federer is the only male player to be seeded No. 1 for 18 consecutive Grand Slam tournaments from 2004 French Open to 2008 Wimbledon.

Federer is the only player to defend three majors (2007 Australian Open, Wimbledon and US Open) that he won the year before. His six Australian Open titles are second behind Djokovic's 10 titles. His 5 US Open titles are record shared with Jimmy Connors and Sampras.

Federer first ascended to the world No. 1 ranking on 2 February 2004 and would remain there for a record 237-consecutive weeks, until 17 August 2008, shattering the previous record of 160-consecutive weeks which was set by Jimmy Connors on 22 August 1977, four years before Federer was born. At the time, Pete Sampras held the record for most career weeks at No. 1 in singles on the ATP Tour. Federer would regain the No. 1-ranking on 6 July 2009 and his second stint would last exactly 11 months, until 6 June 2010, bringing his career total to 285 weeks, 1 week shy of Sampras’ record. Federer would have to wait just over 2 years for his third stint at the top of the rankings, but on the 9th and 16th of July 2012, he would spend his 286th and record-breaking 287th, weeks as the world’s No. 1 player. His third stint would last 17-consecutive weeks and as of 4 November 2012, he had spent 302 weeks atop the ATP Tour’s rankings, becoming the first man to surpass 300 career weeks. By winning three major singles titles in 2017 and early 2018, Federer would earn his fourth stint at No. 1 on 19 February 2018, and at 36 years, 6 months and 10 days old, he became the oldest man to hold the No. 1 ranking, breaking Andre Agassi’s record by over three years. Djokovic would surpass Federer’s record in 2024. Federer has spent a total of 310 weeks as the ATP Tour’s No. 1-ranked player in the world, second to only Novak Djokovic since the ATP Tour’s rankings started in 1973. He is the only player in the Open Era, male or female, to hold the No. 1-ranking for more than four consecutive years (2 February 2004 to 17 August 2008).

He has also recorded more than 11,000 career aces and is third on the all-time list. Federer is the first male player to be ranked number-one for more than 300 weeks, and the only player, male or female, to do so for more than 200 consecutive weeks. Federer is the 2nd male player to win more than 100 ATP Titles (103) second behind Connors (109).

Federer is the only player to register at least ten titles on three different surfaces: he has 71 hard-court titles, 19 grass-court titles, and 11 clay-court titles. His 19 grass-court titles are an all-time men's record, while his 71 hard-court titles are the second-most behind Djokovic. He also holds the record for most match wins on grass (192 wins) and hard-court (783 wins). He won an unparalleled 11 Grand Slam tournaments (3 Australian Open titles, 4 Wimbledon titles, and 4 US Open titles) of a possible 16 events from 2004 to 2007. He reached the finals of all four Grand Slam events in the same calendar year three times in his career in 2006, 2007, and 2009, joining Laver (1969) and later joined by Djokovic (2015, 2021, 2023). In the ATP Tour Finals, Federer has won six titles (second to Djokovic) in 10 finals (a stand-alone record) at the year-end tournament featuring the top eight players in the year-end rankings. He has qualified for the tournament a record 18 times (appearing at 17 events), including a record 14 consecutive years from 2002 through 2015.

Federer's 2006 season is considered by most tennis experts to be one of the most dominant of the Open Era. He won three major singles titles, reached the final of the fourth, and won the season-ending Masters Cup. He won four Masters Series events, winning 12 events of the 17 he entered and making the finals of all but one. His overall record was 92 wins and 5 losses.

Due to his many accomplishments, Federer is considered by many sports analysts to be one of the greatest tennis players of all time.

== Performance timelines ==
Key
W	F	SF	QF	#R	RR	Q#	P#	DNQ	A	Z#	PO	G	S	B	NMS	NTI	P	NH

(W) winner; (F) finalist; (SF) semifinalist; (QF) quarterfinalist; (#R) rounds 4, 3, 2, 1; (RR) round-robin stage; (Q#) qualification round; (P#) preliminary round; (DNQ) did not qualify; (A) absent; (Z#) Davis/Fed Cup Zonal Group (with number indication) or (PO) play-off; (G) gold, (S) silver or (B) bronze Olympic/Paralympic medal; (NMS) not a Masters tournament; (NTI) not a Tier I tournament; (P) postponed; (NH) not held; (SR) strike rate (events won / competed); (W–L) win–loss record.
To avoid confusion and double counting, these charts are updated at the conclusion of a tournament or when the player's participation has ended.

Only main-draw results in ATP Tour, Grand Slam tournaments, Davis Cup, Laver Cup and Olympic Games are included in win–loss records.

=== Singles ===
Tournament	1998	1999	2000	2001	2002	2003	2004	2005	2006	2007	2008	2009	2010	2011	2012	2013	2014	2015	2016	2017	2018	2019	2020	2021	SR	W–L	Win %
Grand Slam tournaments
Australian Open	A	Q1	3R	3R	4R	4R	W	SF	W	W	SF	F	W	SF	SF	SF	SF	3R	SF	W	W	4R	SF	A	6 / 21	102–15	87%
French Open	A	1R	4R	QF	1R	1R	3R	SF	F	F	F	W	QF	F	SF	QF	4R	QF	A	A	A	SF	A	4R	1 / 19	73–17	81%
Wimbledon	A	1R	1R	QF	1R	W	W	W	W	W	F	W	QF	QF	W	2R	F	F	SF	W	QF	F	NH^{*}	QF	8 / 22	105–14	88%
US Open	A	Q2	3R	4R	4R	4R	W	W	W	W	W	F	SF	SF	QF	4R	SF	F	A	QF	4R	QF	A	A	5 / 19	89–14	86%
Win–loss	0–0	0–2	7–4	13–4	6–4	13–3	22–1	24–2	27–1	26–1	24–3	26–2	20–3	20–4	19–3	13–4	19–4	18–4	10–2	18–1	14–2	18–4	5–1	7–1	20 / 81	369–60	86%
Year-end championships
ATP Finals	DNQ				SF	W	W	F	W	W	RR	SF	W	W	F	SF	F	F	DNQ	SF	SF	SF	A	DNQ	6 / 17	59–17	78%
National representation
Olympic Games	NH		4th	NH			2R	NH			QF	NH			S	NH			A	NH				A	0 / 4	13–5	72%
Davis Cup	A	QF	1R	QF	1R	SF	QF	PO	PO	PO	PO	PO	A	PO	1R	A	W	PO	A	A	A	A	A	A	1 / 8	40–8	83%
ATP 1000 tournaments
Indian Wells Open	A	A	Q1	1R	3R	2R	W	W	W	2R	SF	SF	3R	SF	W	QF	F	F	A	W	F	F	NH^{*}	A	5 / 18	66–13	84%
Miami Open	A	1R	2R	QF	F	QF	3R	W	W	4R	QF	SF	4R	SF	3R	A	QF	A	A	W	2R	W	NH^{*}	A	4 / 18	56–14	80%
Monte-Carlo Masters	A	1R	1R	QF	2R	A	A	QF	F	F	F	3R	A	QF	A	A	F	3R	QF	A	A	A	NH^{*}	A	0 / 13	30–13	70%
Madrid Open^{1}	A	A	1R	1R	W	3R	W	W	A	W	F	W	F	SF	W	3R	A	2R	A	A	A	QF	NH^{*}	A	6 / 15	49–9	84%
Italian Open	A	A	1R	3R	1R	F	2R	A	F	3R	QF	SF	2R	3R	SF	F	2R	F	3R	A	A	QF	A	A	0 / 17	34–16	68%
Canadian Open	A	A	1R	A	1R	SF	W	A	W	F	2R	QF	F	3R	A	A	F	A	A	F	A	A	NH^{*}	A	2 / 12	35–10	78%
Cincinnati Open	A	A	1R	A	1R	2R	1R	W	2R	W	3R	W	W	QF	W	QF	W	W	A	A	F	3R	A	A	7 / 17	47–10	82%
Shanghai Masters^{2}	A	A	2R	2R	QF	SF	A	A	W	F	SF	A	F	A	SF	3R	W	2R	A	W	SF	QF	NH^{*}		3 / 15	41–12	77%
Paris Masters	A	A	1R	2R	QF	QF	A	A	A	3R	QF	2R	SF	W	A	SF	QF	3R	A	A	SF	A	A	A	1 / 13	23–11	68%
Win–loss	0–0	0–2	2–8	8–7	18–8	21–8	20–3	27–1	34–3	26–7	22–8	24–6	22–7	22–7	23–3	14–6	28–6	16–6	3–2	20–1	14–5	17–4	0–0	0–0	28 / 138	381–108	78%
Career statistics
	1998	1999	2000	2001	2002	2003	2004	2005	2006	2007	2008	2009	2010	2011	2012	2013	2014	2015	2016	2017	2018	2019	2020	2021	SR	W–L	Win %
Tournaments^{3}	3	14	28	21	25	23	17	15	17	16	19	15	18	16	17	17	17	17	7	12	13	14	1	5	Career total: 367		
Titles	0	0	0	1	3	7	11	11	12	8	4	4	5	4	6	1	5	6	0	7	4	4	0	0	Career total: 103		
Finals	0	0	2	3	5	9	11	12	16	12	8	7	9	6	10	3	11	11	1	8	7	6	0	0	Career total: 157		
Hard W–L	2–1	7–6	24–16	21–9	30–11	46–11	46–4	50–1	59–2	44–6	34–10	36–10	47–7	46–7	41–7	28–11	56–7	39–6	8–2	42–4	38–8	33–7	5–1	1–1	71 / 220	783–155	83%
Grass W–L	0–0	0–2	2–3	9–3	5–3	12–0	12–0	12–0	12–0	6–0	11–1	7–0	8–2	6–1	15–2	5–1	9–1	11–1	10–3	12–1	12–2	11–1	0–0	5–2	19 / 48	192–29	87%
Clay W–L	0–1	0–5	3–7	9–5	12–4	15–4	16–2	15–2	16–3	16–3	21–4	18–2	10–4	12–4	15–3	12–5	8–4	13–4	3–2	0–0	0–0	9–2	0–0	3–1	11 / 80	226–71	76%
Carpet W–L	0–1	6–4	7–4	10–4	11–4	5–2	0–0	4–1	5–0	2–0	0–0	discontinued													2 / 19	50–20	71%
Overall W–L^{4}	2–3	13–17	36–30	49–21	58–22	78–17	74–6	81–4	92–5	68–9	66–15	61–12	65–13	64–12	71–12	45–17	73–12	63–11	21–7	54–5	50–10	53–10	5–1	9–4	103 / 367	1251–275	82%
Win %	40%	43%	55%	70%	73%	82%	93%	95%	95%	88%	81%	84%	83%	84%	86%	73%	86%	85%	75%	92%	83%	84%	83%	69%	82%		
Year-end ranking	301	64	29	13	6	2	1	1	1	1	2	1	2	3	2	6	2	3	16	2	3	3	5	16	$ 130,594,339		

Note: Federer received fourth-round walkovers at the US Open (2004 and 2012) and the Wimbledon Championships (2007), and a second-round walkover at the Australian Open (2012), these are not counted as wins, also Federer withdrew before the fourth round of the 2021 French Open.

^{1} Held as Hamburg Masters (outdoor clay) until 2008, Madrid Masters (outdoor clay) 2009 – present.
^{2} Held as Stuttgart Masters (indoor hard) until 2001, Madrid Masters (indoor hard) from 2002 to 2008, and Shanghai Masters (outdoor hard) 2009 – present.
^{3} Including appearances in Grand Slam, ATP Tour main draw matches, and Summer Olympics.
^{4} Including matches in Grand Slam, ATP Tour events, Summer Olympics, Davis Cup and Laver Cup.
^{*} not held due to COVID-19 pandemic.

=== Doubles ===
Tournament	1998	1999	2000	2001	2002	2003	2004	2005	2006	2007	2008	2009	2010	2011	2012	2013	2014	2015	2016	2017	2018	2019	2020	2021	2022	SR	W–L	Win%
Grand Slam tournaments
Australian Open	A	A	1R	1R	A	3R	1R	A	A	A	A	A	A	A	A	A	A	A	A	A	A	A	A	A	A	0 / 4	2–4	33%
French Open	A	A	1R	A	A	A	A	A	A	A	A	A	A	A	A	A	A	A	A	A	A	A	A	A	A	0 / 1	0–1	0%
Wimbledon	A	3R	QF	3R	A	A	A	A	A	A	A	A	A	A	A	A	A	A	A	A	A	A	A	A	A	0 / 3	7–2	78%
US Open	A	A	2R	A	3R	A	A	A	A	A	A	A	A	A	A	A	A	A	A	A	A	A	A	A	A	0 / 2	3–2	60%
Win–loss	0–0	2–1	4–4	2–1	2–1	2–1	0–1	0–0	0–0	0–0	0–0	0–0	0–0	0–0	0–0	0–0	0–0	0–0	0–0	0–0	0–0	0–0	0–0	0–0	0–0	0 / 10	12–9	57%
National representation
Olympic Games	Not Held		A	Not Held			2R	Not Held			G	Not Held			2R	Not Held			A	Not Held				A	NH	1 / 3	7–2	78%
Davis Cup	A	QF	1R	QF	1R	SF	QF	PO	PO	PO	PO	PO	A	PO	1R	A	W	PO	A	A	A	A	A	A	A	1 / 8	12–10	57%
ATP 1000 tournaments
Indian Wells Open	A	A	SF	2R	F	QF	2R	A	1R	2R	A	1R	A	F	A	A	SF	1R	A	A	A	A	A	A	A	0 / 11	18–11	62%
Miami Open	A	A	2R	3R	SF	W	A	A	A	A	A	A	A	A	A	A	A	A	A	A	A	A	A	A	A	1 / 4	10–3	77%
Monte-Carlo Masters	A	A	SF	2R	1R	A	A	A	QF	A	A	A	A	A	A	A	A	A	A	A	A	A	A	A	A	0 / 4	6–4	60%
German Open^{1}	A	A	QF	1R	A	A	A	2R	A	1R	A	A	A	A	A	A	A	A	A	A	A	A	A	A	A	0 / 4	3–4	43%
Italian Open	A	A	A	1R	2R	QF	2R	A	A	1R	A	A	QF	A	A	A	A	A	A	A	A	A	A	A	A	0 / 6	6–6	50%
Canadian Open	A	A	1R	A	QF	A	A	A	A	2R	2R	A	A	A	A	A	A	A	A	A	A	A	A	A	A	0 / 4	4–4	50%
Cincinnati Open	A	A	QF	A	2R	A	A	1R	A	A	A	A	A	A	A	A	A	A	A	A	A	A	A	A	A	0 / 3	3–2	60%
Shanghai Masters^{2}	A	A	2R	A	A	A	A	A	A	A	A	A	A	A	A	2R	A	A	A	A	A	A	NH			0 / 2	2–2	50%
Paris Masters	A	A	2R	A	A	A	A	A	A	A	A	A	A	A	A	A	A	A	A	A	A	A	A	A	A	0 / 1	0–1	0%
Win–loss	0–0	0–0	12–8	3–5	11–5	8–2	2–2	1–2	2–2	2–4	1–1	0–1	2–1	4–1	0–0	1–1	3–1	0–1	0–0	0–0	0–0	0–0	0–0	0–0	0–0	1 / 39	52–37	58%
Career statistics
	1998	1999	2000	2001	2002	2003	2004	2005	2006	2007	2008	2009	2010	2011	2012	2013	2014	2015	2016	2017	2018	2019	2020	2021	2022	SR	W–L	Win %
Tournaments^{3}	1	6	20	12	12	7	6	3	3	5	2	2	2	1	1	2	3	2	0	0	0	0	0	0	0	Career total: 90		
Titles	0	0	0	2	2	2	0	1	0	0	1	0	0	0	0	0	0	0	0	0	0	0	0	0	0	Career total: 8		
Finals	0	0	1	2	3	3	1	1	0	0	1	0	0	1	0	0	1	0	0	0	0	0	0	0	0	Career total: 14		
Hard W–L	0–0	2–3	9–10	6–4	18–6	16–4	5–6	0–1	1–2	3–3	7–1	0–2	0–0	5–1	0–0	1–1	5–3	0–3	0–0	1–0	0–2	1–1	0–0	0–0	0–1	5 / 51	80–54	60%
Grass W–L	0–0	2–2	4–3	2–1	0–0	1–1	0–1	3–0	0–0	0–0	0–0	0–0	0–1	0–1	1–1	0–1	2–1	0–0	0–0	0–0	0–0	0–0	0–0	0–0	0–0	1 / 14	15–13	54%
Clay W–L	0–0	1–1	6–4	5–3	2–4	2–1	1–0	2–1	2–1	0–2	0–0	0–0	2–1	0–0	0–2	0–0	1–0	0–0	0–0	0–0	0–0	0–0	0–0	0–0	0–0	1 / 19	24–20	55%
Carpet W–L	0–1	0–0	6–3	2–0	4–0	0–1	0–0	0–0	0–0	0–1	0–0	Discontinued														1 / 6	12–6	67%
Overall W–L^{4}	0–1	5–6	25–20	15–8	24–10	19–7	6–7	5–2	3–3	3–6	7–1	0–2	2–2	5–2	1–3	1–2	8–4	0–3	0–0	1–0	0–2	1–1	0–0	0–0	0–1	8 / 90	131–93	58%
Win %	0%	45%	56%	65%	71%	73%	46%	71%	50%	33%	88%	0%	50%	71%	25%	33%	67%	0%	–	100%	0%	50%	–	–	0%	58%		
Year-end ranking	–	165	32	65	25	31	163	179	373	246	581	–	327	135	1266	560	100	–	–	–	–	–	–	–	–			

^{1} Held as Hamburg Masters (outdoor clay) until 2008, Madrid Masters (outdoor clay) 2009 – present.
^{2} Held as Stuttgart Masters (indoor hard) until 2001, Madrid Masters (indoor hard) from 2002 to 2008, and Shanghai Masters (outdoor hard) 2009 – present.
^{3} Including appearances in Grand Slam, ATP Tour main draw matches, and Summer Olympics.
^{4} Including matches in Grand Slam, ATP Tour events, Summer Olympics, Davis Cup and Laver Cup.

== Grand Slam tournament finals ==
Federer has won the third-most Grand Slam tournaments of any male player in tennis history (20), behind Djokovic (24) and Nadal (22). He has reached the second-most finals (31), second-most semifinals (46), second-most quarterfinals (58), and second-most fourth rounds (69), and has participated at the joint-most tournaments (81, along with Feliciano López). He has won the second-most matches at these tournaments (369, behind Djokovic). He is the only man to win three tournaments at least five times each, and to win two of these tournaments five consecutive times. He is one of eight men to win all four Grand Slam tournaments.

=== Grand Slam tournament finals: 31 (20 titles, 11 runner-ups) ===
Result	Year	Tournament	Surface	Opponent	Score
Win	2003	Wimbledon	Grass	(Australia) Mark Philippoussis	7–6^{(7–5)}, 6–2, 7–6^{(7–3)}
Win	2004	Australian Open	Hard	(Russia) Marat Safin	7–6^{(7–3)}, 6–4, 6–2
Win	2004	Wimbledon (2)	Grass	(United States) Andy Roddick	4–6, 7–5, 7–6^{(7–3)}, 6–4
Win	2004	US Open	Hard	(Australia) Lleyton Hewitt	6–0, 7–6^{(7–3)}, 6–0
Win	2005	Wimbledon (3)	Grass	(United States) Andy Roddick	6–2, 7–6^{(7–2)}, 6–4
Win	2005	US Open (2)	Hard	(United States) Andre Agassi	6–3, 2–6, 7–6^{(7–1)}, 6–1
Win	2006	Australian Open (2)	Hard	(Cyprus) Marcos Baghdatis	5–7, 7–5, 6–0, 6–2
Loss	2006	French Open	Clay	(Spain) Rafael Nadal	6–1, 1–6, 4–6, 6–7^{(4–7)}
Win	2006	Wimbledon (4)	Grass	(Spain) Rafael Nadal	6–0, 7–6^{(7–5)}, 6–7^{(2–7)}, 6–3
Win	2006	US Open (3)	Hard	(United States) Andy Roddick	6–2, 4–6, 7–5, 6–1
Win	2007	Australian Open (3)	Hard	(Chile) Fernando González	7–6^{(7–2)}, 6–4, 6–4
Loss	2007	French Open	Clay	(Spain) Rafael Nadal	3–6, 6–4, 3–6, 4–6
Win	2007	Wimbledon (5)	Grass	(Spain) Rafael Nadal	7–6^{(9–7)}, 4–6, 7–6^{(7–3)}, 2–6, 6–2
Win	2007	US Open (4)	Hard	(Serbia) Novak Djokovic	7–6^{(7–4)}, 7–6^{(7–2)}, 6–4
Loss	2008	French Open	Clay	(Spain) Rafael Nadal	1–6, 3–6, 0–6
Loss	2008	Wimbledon	Grass	(Spain) Rafael Nadal	4–6, 4–6, 7–6^{(7–5)}, 7–6^{(10–8)}, 7–9
Win	2008	US Open (5)	Hard	(United Kingdom) Andy Murray	6–2, 7–5, 6–2
Loss	2009	Australian Open	Hard	(Spain) Rafael Nadal	5–7, 6–3, 6–7^{(3–7)}, 6–3, 2–6
Win	2009	French Open	Clay	(Sweden) Robin Söderling	6–1, 7–6^{(7–1)}, 6–4
Win	2009	Wimbledon (6)	Grass	(United States) Andy Roddick	5–7, 7–6^{(8–6)}, 7–6^{(7–5)}, 3–6, 16–14
Loss	2009	US Open	Hard	(Argentina) Juan Martín del Potro	6–3, 6–7^{(5–7)}, 6–4, 6–7^{(4–7)}, 2–6
Win	2010	Australian Open (4)	Hard	(United Kingdom) Andy Murray	6–3, 6–4, 7–6^{(13–11)}
Loss	2011	French Open	Clay	(Spain) Rafael Nadal	5–7, 6–7^{(3–7)}, 7–5, 1–6
Win	2012	Wimbledon (7)	Grass	(United Kingdom) Andy Murray	4–6, 7–5, 6–3, 6–4
Loss	2014	Wimbledon	Grass	(Serbia) Novak Djokovic	7–6^{(9–7)}, 4–6, 6–7^{(4–7)}, 7–5, 4–6
Loss	2015	Wimbledon	Grass	(Serbia) Novak Djokovic	6–7^{(1–7)}, 7–6^{(12–10)}, 4–6, 3–6
Loss	2015	US Open	Hard	(Serbia) Novak Djokovic	4–6, 7–5, 4–6, 4–6
Win	2017	Australian Open (5)	Hard	(Spain) Rafael Nadal	6–4, 3–6, 6–1, 3–6, 6–3
Win	2017	Wimbledon (8)	Grass	(Croatia) Marin Čilić	6–3, 6–1, 6–4
Win	2018	Australian Open (6)	Hard	(Croatia) Marin Čilić	6–2, 6–7^{(5–7)}, 6–3, 3–6, 6–1
Loss	2019	Wimbledon	Grass	(Serbia) Novak Djokovic	6–7^{(5–7)}, 6–1, 6–7^{(4–7)}, 6–4, 12–13^{(3–7)}

=== Career Grand Slam tournament seedings ===
The tournaments won by Federer are in boldface. Federer has been seeded first in 24 Grand Slam tournaments, with 18 of those being consecutively. Also, he was seeded first or second in 30 consecutive Grand Slams and was among the top 4 seeds for 10 straight years after winning his first Grand Slam (the 2003 Wimbledon Championships), through the 2013 Wimbledon Championships. He has both won and been runner-up at tournaments when seeded 1st, 2nd, 3rd and 4th.

Legend (slams won / times seeded) seeded No. 1 (**11** / 24) seeded No. 2 (**5** / 18) seeded No. 3 (**2** / 15) seeded No. 4–10 (**1** / 11) seeded No. 11–32 (**1** / 5) not seeded/WC (0 / 8)	Longest / total: 18 / 81; 5 / 81; 6 / 81; 4 / 81; 3 / 81; 6 / 81

Year	Australian Open	French Open	Wimbledon	US Open
1999	did not play	wildcard	wildcard	did not play
2000	not seeded	not seeded	not seeded	not seeded
2001	not seeded	not seeded	15th	13th
2002	11th	8th	7th	13th
2003	6th	5th	**4th**	2nd
2004	**2nd**	1st	**1st**	**1st**
2005	1st	1st	**1st**	**1st**
2006	**1st**	1st	**1st**	**1st**
2007	**1st**	1st	**1st**	**1st**
2008	1st	1st	1st	**2nd**
2009	2nd	**2nd**	**2nd**	1st
2010	**1st**	1st	1st	2nd
2011	2nd	3rd	3rd	3rd
2012	3rd	3rd	**3rd**	1st
2013	2nd	2nd	3rd	7th
2014	6th	4th	4th	2nd
2015	2nd	2nd	2nd	2nd
2016	3rd	did not play	3rd	did not play
2017	**17th**	did not play	**3rd**	3rd
2018	**2nd**	did not play	1st	2nd
2019	3rd	3rd	2nd	3rd
2020	3rd	did not play	cancelled*	did not play
2021	did not play	8th	6th	did not play

* Due to the COVID-19 pandemic, the 2020 Wimbledon Championships of the tournament was cancelled.

== Other significant finals ==
=== Year-end championships ===
Federer has won the second-most year-end championships (6) after Novak Djokovic. He has reached the most finals (10) and semifinals (16). He has participated at the most championships consecutively (14) and the most outright (17). He has won the most matches at the championships (59).

=== Year-end championship finals: 10 (6 titles, 4 runner-ups) ===
Result	Year	Tournament	Surface	Opponent	Score
Win	2003	Tennis Masters Cup	Hard	(United States) Andre Agassi	6–3, 6–0, 6–4
Win	2004	Tennis Masters Cup	Hard	(Australia) Lleyton Hewitt	6–3, 6–2
Loss	2005	Tennis Masters Cup	Carpet (i)	(Argentina) David Nalbandian	7–6^{(7–4)}, 7–6^{(13–11)}, 2–6, 1–6, 6–7^{(3–7)}
Win	2006	Tennis Masters Cup	Hard (i)	(United States) James Blake	6–0, 6–3, 6–4
Win	2007	Tennis Masters Cup	Hard (i)	(Spain) David Ferrer	6–2, 6–3, 6–2
Win	2010	ATP Finals	Hard (i)	(Spain) Rafael Nadal	6–3, 3–6, 6–1
Win	2011	ATP Finals	Hard (i)	(France) Jo-Wilfried Tsonga	6–3, 6–7^{(6–8)}, 6–3
Loss	2012	ATP Finals	Hard (i)	(Serbia) Novak Djokovic	6–7^{(6–8)}, 5–7
Walkover	2014	ATP Finals	Hard (i)	(Serbia) Novak Djokovic	walkover
Loss	2015	ATP Finals	Hard (i)	(Serbia) Novak Djokovic	3–6, 4–6

=== ATP 1000 tournament finals ===
Finals by surface
Hard (22–12)
Clay (6–10)

==== Singles: 50 (28 titles, 22 runner-ups) ====
Federer has won the third-most Masters titles (28), reached the third-most finals (50) and the third-most semifinals (66). He is one of seven men to win at least seven different titles and is one of four to reach each final. He has won the third-most matches (381) at these tournaments.

Result	Year	Tournament	Surface	Opponent	Score
Loss	2002	Miami Open	Hard	(United States) Andre Agassi	3–6, 3–6, 6–3, 4–6
Win	2002	German Open	Clay	(Russia) Marat Safin	6–1, 6–3, 6–4
Loss	2003	Italian Open	Clay	(Spain) Félix Mantilla	5–7, 2–6, 6–7^{(8–10)}
Win	2004	Indian Wells Open	Hard	(United Kingdom) Tim Henman	6–3, 6–3
Win	2004	German Open (2)	Clay	(Argentina) Guillermo Coria	4–6, 6–4, 6–2, 6–3
Win	2004	Canadian Open	Hard	(United States) Andy Roddick	7–5, 6–3
Win	2005	Indian Wells Open (2)	Hard	(Australia) Lleyton Hewitt	6–2, 6–4, 6–4
Win	2005	Miami Open	Hard	(Spain) Rafael Nadal	2–6, 6–7^{(4–7)}, 7–6^{(7–5)}, 6–3, 6–1
Win	2005	German Open (3)	Clay	(France) Richard Gasquet	6–3, 7–5, 7–6^{(7–4)}
Win	2005	Cincinnati Open	Hard	(United States) Andy Roddick	6–3, 7–5
Win	2006	Indian Wells Open (3)	Hard	(United States) James Blake	7–5, 6–3, 6–0
Win	2006	Miami Open (2)	Hard	(Croatia) Ivan Ljubičić	7–6^{(7–5)}, 7–6^{(7–4)}, 7–6^{(8–6)}
Loss	2006	Monte-Carlo Masters	Clay	(Spain) Rafael Nadal	2–6, 7–6^{(7–2)}, 3–6, 6–7^{(5–7)}
Loss	2006	Italian Open	Clay	(Spain) Rafael Nadal	7–6^{(7–0)}, 6–7^{(5–7)}, 4–6, 6–2, 6–7^{(5–7)}
Win	2006	Canadian Open (2)	Hard	(France) Richard Gasquet	2–6, 6–3, 6–2
Win	2006	Madrid Open	Hard (i)	(Chile) Fernando González	7–5, 6–1, 6–0
Loss	2007	Monte-Carlo Masters	Clay	(Spain) Rafael Nadal	4–6, 4–6
Win	2007	German Open (4)	Clay	(Spain) Rafael Nadal	2–6, 6–2, 6–0
Loss	2007	Canadian Open	Hard	(Serbia) Novak Djokovic	6–7^{(2–7)}, 6–2, 6–7^{(2–7)}
Win	2007	Cincinnati Open (2)	Hard	(United States) James Blake	6–1, 6–4
Loss	2007	Madrid Open	Hard (i)	(Argentina) David Nalbandian	6–1, 3–6, 3–6
Loss	2008	Monte-Carlo Masters	Clay	(Spain) Rafael Nadal	5–7, 5–7
Loss	2008	German Open	Clay	(Spain) Rafael Nadal	5–7, 7–6^{(7–3)}, 3–6
Win	2009	Madrid Open (2)	Clay	(Spain) Rafael Nadal	6–4, 6–4
Win	2009	Cincinnati Open (3)	Hard	(Serbia) Novak Djokovic	6–1, 7–5
Loss	2010	Madrid Open	Clay	(Spain) Rafael Nadal	4–6, 6–7^{(5–7)}
Loss	2010	Canadian Open	Hard	(United Kingdom) Andy Murray	5–7, 5–7
Win	2010	Cincinnati Open (4)	Hard	(United States) Mardy Fish	6–7^{(5–7)}, 7–6^{(7–1)}, 6–4
Loss	2010	Shanghai Masters	Hard	(United Kingdom) Andy Murray	3–6, 2–6
Win	2011	Paris Masters	Hard (i)	(France) Jo-Wilfried Tsonga	6–1, 7–6^{(7–3)}
Win	2012	Indian Wells Open (4)	Hard	(United States) John Isner	7–6^{(9–7)}, 6–3
Win	2012	Madrid Open (3)	Clay	(Czech Republic) Tomáš Berdych	3–6, 7–5, 7–5
Win	2012	Cincinnati Open (5)	Hard	(Serbia) Novak Djokovic	6–0, 7–6^{(9–7)}
Loss	2013	Italian Open	Clay	(Spain) Rafael Nadal	1–6, 3–6
Loss	2014	Indian Wells Open	Hard	(Serbia) Novak Djokovic	6–3, 3–6, 6–7^{(3–7)}
Loss	2014	Monte-Carlo Masters	Clay	(Switzerland) Stan Wawrinka	6–4, 6–7^{(5–7)}, 2–6
Loss	2014	Canadian Open	Hard	(France) Jo-Wilfried Tsonga	5–7, 6–7^{(3–7)}
Win	2014	Cincinnati Open (6)	Hard	(Spain) David Ferrer	6–3, 1–6, 6–2
Win	2014	Shanghai Masters	Hard	(France) Gilles Simon	7–6^{(8–6)}, 7–6^{(7–2)}
Loss	2015	Indian Wells Open	Hard	(Serbia) Novak Djokovic	3–6, 7–6^{(7–5)}, 2–6
Loss	2015	Italian Open	Clay	(Serbia) Novak Djokovic	4–6, 3–6
Win	2015	Cincinnati Open (7)	Hard	(Serbia) Novak Djokovic	7–6^{(7–1)}, 6–3
Win	2017	Indian Wells Open (5)	Hard	(Switzerland) Stan Wawrinka	6–4, 7–5
Win	2017	Miami Open (3)	Hard	(Spain) Rafael Nadal	6–3, 6–4
Loss	2017	Canadian Open	Hard	(Germany) Alexander Zverev	3–6, 4–6
Win	2017	Shanghai Masters (2)	Hard	(Spain) Rafael Nadal	6–4, 6–3
Loss	2018	Indian Wells Open	Hard	(Argentina) Juan Martín del Potro	4–6, 7–6^{(10–8)}, 6–7^{(2–7)}
Loss	2018	Cincinnati Open	Hard	(Serbia) Novak Djokovic	4–6, 4–6
Loss	2019	Indian Wells Open	Hard	(Austria) Dominic Thiem	6–3, 3–6, 5–7
Win	2019	Miami Open (4)	Hard	(United States) John Isner	6–1, 6–4

==== Doubles: 3 (1 title, 2 runner-ups) ====
Result	Year	Tournament	Surface	Partner	Opponents	Score
Loss	2002	Indian Wells Open	Hard	(Belarus) Max Mirnyi	(The Bahamas) Mark Knowles (Canada) Daniel Nestor	4–6, 4–6
Win	2003	Miami Open	Hard	(Belarus) Max Mirnyi	(India) Leander Paes (Czech Republic) David Rikl	7–5, 6–3
Loss	2011	Indian Wells Open	Hard	(Switzerland) Stan Wawrinka	(Ukraine) Alexandr Dolgopolov (Belgium) Xavier Malisse	4–6, 7–6^{(7–5)}, [7–10]

=== Olympic medal matches ===
==== Singles: 2 (1 silver medal) ====
Result	Year	Tournament	Surface	Opponent	Score
4th Place	2000	Sydney Olympics	Hard	(France) Arnaud Di Pasquale	6–7^{(5–7)}, 7–6^{(9–7)}, 3–6
Silver	2012	London Olympics	Grass	(United Kingdom) Andy Murray	2–6, 1–6, 4–6

==== Doubles: 1 (1 gold medal) ====
Result	Year	Tournament	Surface	Partner	Opponents	Score
Gold	2008	Beijing Olympics	Hard	(Switzerland) Stan Wawrinka	(Sweden) Simon Aspelin (Sweden) Thomas Johansson	6–3, 6–4, 6–7^{(4–7)}, 6–3

== ATP Tour career finals ==
=== Singles: 157 (103 titles, 54 runner-ups) ===
Legend Grand Slam tournaments (20–11) Tennis Masters Cup/ ATP Finals (6–4) ATP Masters Series/ ATP Masters 1000/ ATP 1000 (28–22) Olympic Games (0–1) ATP International Series Gold/ ATP 500 (24–7) ATP International Series/ ATP 250 (25–9)	Finals by surface Hard (71–27) Grass (19–8) Clay (11–15) Carpet (2–4)	Finals by setting Outdoor (77–41) Indoor (26–13)

Result	W–L	Date	Tournament	Tier	Surface	Opponent	Score
Loss	0–1	Feb 2000	Marseille Open, France	International	Hard (i)	(Switzerland) Marc Rosset	6–2, 3–6, 6–7^{(5–7)}
Loss	0–2	Oct 2000	Swiss Indoors, Switzerland	International	Carpet (i)	(Sweden) Thomas Enqvist	2–6, 6–4, 6–7^{(4–7)}, 6–1, 1–6
Win	1–2	Feb 2001	Milan Indoor, Italy	International	Carpet (i)	(France) Julien Boutter	6–4, 6–7^{(7–9)}, 6–4
Loss	1–3	Feb 2001	Rotterdam Open, Netherlands	International G	Hard (i)	(France) Nicolas Escudé	5–7, 6–3, 6–7^{(5–7)}
Loss	1–4	Oct 2001	Swiss Indoors, Switzerland	International	Carpet (i)	(United Kingdom) Tim Henman	3–6, 4–6, 2–6
Win	2–4	Jan 2002	Sydney International, Australia	International	Hard	(Argentina) Juan Ignacio Chela	6–3, 6–3
Loss	2–5	Feb 2002	Milan Indoor, Italy	International	Carpet (i)	(Italy) Davide Sanguinetti	6–7^{(2–7)}, 6–4, 1–6
Loss	2–6	Mar 2002	Miami Open, USA	Masters	Hard	(United States) Andre Agassi	3–6, 3–6, 6–3, 4–6
Win	3–6	May 2002	German Open, Germany	Masters	Clay	(Russia) Marat Safin	6–1, 6–3, 6–4
Win	4–6	Oct 2002	Vienna Open, Austria	International G	Hard (i)	(Czech Republic) Jiří Novák	6–4, 6–1, 3–6, 6–4
Win	5–6	Feb 2003	Marseille Open, France	International	Hard (i)	(Sweden) Jonas Björkman	6–2, 7–6^{(8–6)}
Win	6–6	Mar 2003	Dubai Championships, UAE	International G	Hard	(Czech Republic) Jiří Novák	6–1, 7–6^{(7–2)}
Win	7–6	May 2003	Bavarian Championships, Germany	International	Clay	(Finland) Jarkko Nieminen	6–1, 6–4
Loss	7–7	May 2003	Italian Open, Italy	Masters	Clay	(Spain) Félix Mantilla	5–7, 2–6, 6–7^{(8–10)}
Win	8–7	Jun 2003	Halle Open, Germany	International	Grass	(Germany) Nicolas Kiefer	6–1, 6–3
Win	9–7	Jul 2003	Wimbledon, UK	Grand Slam	Grass	(Australia) Mark Philippoussis	7–6^{(7–5)}, 6–2, 7–6^{(7–3)}
Loss	9–8	Jul 2003	Swiss Open, Switzerland	International	Clay	(Czech Republic) Jiří Novák	7–5, 3–6, 3–6, 6–1, 3–6
Win	10–8	Oct 2003	Vienna Open, Austria (2)	International G	Hard (i)	(Spain) Carlos Moyà	6–3, 6–3, 6–3
Win	11–8	Nov 2003	ATP Finals, USA	ATP Finals	Hard	(United States) Andre Agassi	6–3, 6–0, 6–4
Win	12–8	Feb 2004	Australian Open, Australia	Grand Slam	Hard	(Russia) Marat Safin	7–6^{(7–3)}, 6–4, 6–2
Win	13–8	Mar 2004	Dubai Championships, UAE (2)	International G	Hard	(Spain) Feliciano López	4–6, 6–1, 6–2
Win	14–8	Mar 2004	Indian Wells Open, USA	Masters	Hard	(United Kingdom) Tim Henman	6–3, 6–3
Win	15–8	May 2004	German Open, Germany (2)	Masters	Clay	(Argentina) Guillermo Coria	4–6, 6–4, 6–2, 6–3
Win	16–8	Jun 2004	Halle Open, Germany (2)	International	Grass	(United States) Mardy Fish	6–0, 6–3
Win	17–8	Jul 2004	Wimbledon, UK (2)	Grand Slam	Grass	(United States) Andy Roddick	4–6, 7–5, 7–6^{(7–3)}, 6–4
Win	18–8	Jul 2004	Swiss Open, Switzerland	International	Clay	(Russia) Igor Andreev	6–2, 6–3, 5–7, 6–3
Win	19–8	Aug 2004	Canadian Open, Canada	Masters	Hard	(United States) Andy Roddick	7–5, 6–3
Win	20–8	Sep 2004	US Open, USA	Grand Slam	Hard	(Australia) Lleyton Hewitt	6–0, 7–6^{(7–3)}, 6–0
Win	21–8	Oct 2004	Thailand Open, Thailand	International	Hard (i)	(United States) Andy Roddick	6–4, 6–0
Win	22–8	Nov 2004	ATP Finals, USA (2)	ATP Finals	Hard	(Australia) Lleyton Hewitt	6–3, 6–2
Win	23–8	Jan 2005	Qatar Open, Qatar	International	Hard	(Croatia) Ivan Ljubičić	6–3, 6–1
Win	24–8	Feb 2005	Rotterdam Open, Netherlands	International G	Hard (i)	(Croatia) Ivan Ljubičić	5–7, 7–5, 7–6^{(7–5)}
Win	25–8	Feb 2005	Dubai Championships, UAE (3)	International G	Hard	(Croatia) Ivan Ljubičić	6–1, 6–7^{(6–8)}, 6–3
Win	26–8	Mar 2005	Indian Wells Open, USA (2)	Masters	Hard	(Australia) Lleyton Hewitt	6–2, 6–4, 6–4
Win	27–8	Apr 2005	Miami Open, USA	Masters	Hard	(Spain) Rafael Nadal	2–6, 6–7^{(4–7)}, 7–6^{(7–5)}, 6–3, 6–1
Win	28–8	May 2005	German Open, Germany (3)	Masters	Clay	(France) Richard Gasquet	6–3, 7–5, 7–6^{(7–4)}
Win	29–8	Jun 2005	Halle Open, Germany (3)	International	Grass	(Russia) Marat Safin	6–4, 6–7^{(6–8)}, 6–4
Win	30–8	Jul 2005	Wimbledon, UK (3)	Grand Slam	Grass	(United States) Andy Roddick	6–2, 7–6^{(7–2)}, 6–4
Win	31–8	Aug 2005	Cincinnati Open, USA	Masters	Hard	(United States) Andy Roddick	6–3, 7–5
Win	32–8	Sep 2005	US Open, USA (2)	Grand Slam	Hard	(United States) Andre Agassi	6–3, 2–6, 7–6^{(7–1)}, 6–1
Win	33–8	Oct 2005	Thailand Open, Thailand (2)	International	Hard (i)	(United Kingdom) Andy Murray	6–3, 7–5
Loss	33–9	Nov 2005	ATP Finals, China	ATP Finals	Carpet (i)	(Argentina) David Nalbandian	7–6^{(7–4)}, 7–6^{(13–11)}, 2–6, 1–6, 6–7^{(3–7)}
Win	34–9	Jan 2006	Qatar Open, Qatar (2)	International	Hard	(France) Gaël Monfils	6–3, 7–6^{(7–5)}
Win	35–9	Jan 2006	Australian Open, Australia (2)	Grand Slam	Hard	(Cyprus) Marcos Baghdatis	5–7, 7–5, 6–0, 6–2
Loss	35–10	Mar 2006	Dubai Championships, UAE	International G	Hard	(Spain) Rafael Nadal	6–2, 4–6, 4–6
Win	36–10	Mar 2006	Indian Wells Open, USA (3)	Masters	Hard	(United States) James Blake	7–5, 6–3, 6–0
Win	37–10	Apr 2006	Miami Open, USA (2)	Masters	Hard	(Croatia) Ivan Ljubičić	7–6^{(7–5)}, 7–6^{(7–4)}, 7–6^{(8–6)}
Loss	37–11	Apr 2006	Monte-Carlo Masters, Monaco	Masters	Clay	(Spain) Rafael Nadal	2–6, 7–6^{(7–2)}, 3–6, 6–7^{(5–7)}
Loss	37–12	May 2006	Italian Open, Italy	Masters	Clay	(Spain) Rafael Nadal	7–6^{(7–0)}, 6–7^{(5–7)}, 4–6, 6–2, 6–7^{(5–7)}
Loss	37–13	June 2006	French Open, France	Grand Slam	Clay	(Spain) Rafael Nadal	6–1, 1–6, 4–6, 6–7^{(4–7)}
Win	38–13	Jun 2006	Halle Open, Germany (4)	International	Grass	(Czech Republic) Tomáš Berdych	6–0, 6–7^{(4–7)}, 6–2
Win	39–13	Jul 2006	Wimbledon, UK (4)	Grand Slam	Grass	(Spain) Rafael Nadal	6–0, 7–6^{(7–5)}, 6–7^{(2–7)}, 6–3
Win	40–13	Aug 2006	Canadian Open, Canada (2)	Masters	Hard	(France) Richard Gasquet	2–6, 6–3, 6–2
Win	41–13	Sep 2006	US Open, USA (3)	Grand Slam	Hard	(United States) Andy Roddick	6–2, 4–6, 7–5, 6–1
Win	42–13	Oct 2006	Japan Open, Japan	International G	Hard	(United Kingdom) Tim Henman	6–3, 6–3
Win	43–13	Oct 2006	Madrid Open, Spain	Masters	Hard (i)	(Chile) Fernando González	7–5, 6–1, 6–0
Win	44–13	Oct 2006	Swiss Indoors, Switzerland	International	Carpet (i)	(Chile) Fernando González	6–3, 6–2, 7–6^{(7–3)}
Win	45–13	Nov 2006	ATP Finals, China (3)	ATP Finals	Hard (i)	(United States) James Blake	6–0, 6–3, 6–4
Win	46–13	Jan 2007	Australian Open, Australia (3)	Grand Slam	Hard	(Chile) Fernando González	7–6^{(7–2)}, 6–4, 6–4
Win	47–13	Mar 2007	Dubai Championships, UAE (4)	International G	Hard	(Russia) Mikhail Youzhny	6–4, 6–3
Loss	47–14	Apr 2007	Monte-Carlo Masters, Monaco	Masters	Clay	(Spain) Rafael Nadal	4–6, 4–6
Win	48–14	May 2007	German Open, Germany (4)	Masters	Clay	(Spain) Rafael Nadal	2–6, 6–2, 6–0
Loss	48–15	Jun 2007	French Open, France	Grand Slam	Clay	(Spain) Rafael Nadal	3–6, 6–4, 3–6, 4–6
Win	49–15	Jul 2007	Wimbledon, UK (5)	Grand Slam	Grass	(Spain) Rafael Nadal	7–6^{(9–7)}, 4–6, 7–6^{(7–3)}, 2–6, 6–2
Loss	49–16	Aug 2007	Canadian Open, Canada	Masters	Hard	(Serbia) Novak Djokovic	6–7^{(2–7)}, 6–2, 6–7^{(2–7)}
Win	50–16	Aug 2007	Cincinnati Open, USA (2)	Masters	Hard	(United States) James Blake	6–1, 6–4
Win	51–16	Sep 2007	US Open, USA (4)	Grand Slam	Hard	(Serbia) Novak Djokovic	7–6^{(7–4)}, 7–6^{(7–2)}, 6–4
Loss	51–17	Oct 2007	Madrid Open, Spain	Masters	Hard (i)	(Argentina) David Nalbandian	6–1, 3–6, 3–6
Win	52–17	Oct 2007	Swiss Indoors, Switzerland (2)	International	Hard (i)	(Finland) Jarkko Nieminen	6–3, 6–4
Win	53–17	Nov 2007	ATP Finals, China (4)	ATP Finals	Hard (i)	(Spain) David Ferrer	6–2, 6–3, 6–2
Win	54–17	Apr 2008	Portugal Open, Portugal	International	Clay	(Russia) Nikolay Davydenko	7–6^{(7–5)}, 1–2 ret.
Loss	54–18	Apr 2008	Monte-Carlo Masters, Monaco	Masters	Clay	(Spain) Rafael Nadal	5–7, 5–7
Loss	54–19	May 2008	German Open, Germany	Masters	Clay	(Spain) Rafael Nadal	5–7, 7–6^{(7–3)}, 3–6
Loss	54–20	Jun 2008	French Open, France	Grand Slam	Clay	(Spain) Rafael Nadal	1–6, 3–6, 0–6
Win	55–20	Jun 2008	Halle Open, Germany (5)	International	Grass	(Germany) Philipp Kohlschreiber	6–3, 6–4
Loss	55–21	Jul 2008	Wimbledon, UK	Grand Slam	Grass	(Spain) Rafael Nadal	4–6, 4–6, 7–6^{(7–5)}, 7–6^{(10–8)}, 7–9
Win	56–21	Sep 2008	US Open, USA (5)	Grand Slam	Hard	(United Kingdom) Andy Murray	6–2, 7–5, 6–2
Win	57–21	Oct 2008	Swiss Indoors, Switzerland (3)	International	Hard (i)	(Argentina) David Nalbandian	6–3, 6–4
Loss	57–22	Feb 2009	Australian Open, Australia	Grand Slam	Hard	(Spain) Rafael Nadal	5–7, 6–3, 6–7^{(3–7)}, 6–3, 2–6
Win	58–22	May 2009	Madrid Open, Spain (2)	ATP 1000	Clay	(Spain) Rafael Nadal	6–4, 6–4
Win	59–22	Jun 2009	French Open, France	Grand Slam	Clay	(Sweden) Robin Söderling	6–1, 7–6^{(7–1)}, 6–4
Win	60–22	Jul 2009	Wimbledon, UK (6)	Grand Slam	Grass	(United States) Andy Roddick	5–7, 7–6^{(8–6)}, 7–6^{(7–5)}, 3–6, 16–14
Win	61–22	Aug 2009	Cincinnati Open, USA (3)	ATP 1000	Hard	(Serbia) Novak Djokovic	6–1, 7–5
Loss	61–23	Sep 2009	US Open, USA	Grand Slam	Hard	(Argentina) Juan Martín del Potro	6–3, 6–7^{(5–7)}, 6–4, 6–7^{(4–7)}, 2–6
Loss	61–24	Nov 2009	Swiss Indoors, Switzerland	ATP 500	Hard (i)	(Serbia) Novak Djokovic	4–6, 6–4, 2–6
Win	62–24	Jan 2010	Australian Open, Australia (4)	Grand Slam	Hard	(United Kingdom) Andy Murray	6–3, 6–4, 7–6^{(13–11)}
Loss	62–25	May 2010	Madrid Open, Spain	ATP 1000	Clay	(Spain) Rafael Nadal	4–6, 6–7^{(5–7)}
Loss	62–26	Jun 2010	Halle Open, Germany	ATP 250	Grass	(Australia) Lleyton Hewitt	6–3, 6–7^{(4–7)}, 4–6
Loss	62–27	Aug 2010	Canadian Open, Canada	ATP 1000	Hard	(United Kingdom) Andy Murray	5–7, 5–7
Win	63–27	Aug 2010	Cincinnati Open, USA (4)	ATP 1000	Hard	(United States) Mardy Fish	6–7^{(5–7)}, 7–6^{(7–1)}, 6–4
Loss	63–28	Oct 2010	Shanghai Masters, China	ATP 1000	Hard	(United Kingdom) Andy Murray	3–6, 2–6
Win	64–28	Oct 2010	Stockholm Open, Sweden	ATP 250	Hard (i)	(Germany) Florian Mayer	6–4, 6–3
Win	65–28	Nov 2010	Swiss Indoors, Switzerland (4)	ATP 500	Hard (i)	(Serbia) Novak Djokovic	6–4, 3–6, 6–1
Win	66–28	Nov 2010	ATP Finals, UK (5)	ATP Finals	Hard (i)	(Spain) Rafael Nadal	6–3, 3–6, 6–1
Win	67–28	Jan 2011	Qatar Open, Qatar (3)	ATP 250	Hard	(Russia) Nikolay Davydenko	6–3, 6–4
Loss	67–29	Feb 2011	Dubai Championships, UAE	ATP 500	Hard	(Serbia) Novak Djokovic	3–6, 3–6
Loss	67–30	Jun 2011	French Open, France	Grand Slam	Clay	(Spain) Rafael Nadal	5–7, 6–7^{(3–7)}, 7–5, 1–6
Win	68–30	Nov 2011	Swiss Indoors, Switzerland (5)	ATP 500	Hard (i)	(Japan) Kei Nishikori	6–1, 6–3
Win	69–30	Nov 2011	Paris Masters, France	ATP 1000	Hard (i)	(France) Jo-Wilfried Tsonga	6–1, 7–6^{(7–3)}
Win	70–30	Nov 2011	ATP Finals, UK (6)	ATP Finals	Hard (i)	(France) Jo-Wilfried Tsonga	6–3, 6–7^{(6–8)}, 6–3
Win	71–30	Feb 2012	Rotterdam Open, Netherlands (2)	ATP 500	Hard (i)	(Argentina) Juan Martín del Potro	6–1, 6–4
Win	72–30	Mar 2012	Dubai Championships, UAE (5)	ATP 500	Hard	(United Kingdom) Andy Murray	7–5, 6–4
Win	73–30	Mar 2012	Indian Wells Open, USA (4)	ATP 1000	Hard	(United States) John Isner	7–6^{(9–7)}, 6–3
Win	74–30	May 2012	Madrid Open, Spain (3)	ATP 1000	Clay	(Czech Republic) Tomáš Berdych	3–6, 7–5, 7–5
Loss	74–31	Jun 2012	Halle Open, Germany	ATP 250	Grass	(Germany) Tommy Haas	6–7^{(5–7)}, 4–6
Win	75–31	Jul 2012	Wimbledon, UK (7)	Grand Slam	Grass	(United Kingdom) Andy Murray	4–6, 7–5, 6–3, 6–4
Loss	75–32	Aug 2012	Olympic Games, UK	Olympics	Grass	(United Kingdom) Andy Murray	2–6, 1–6, 4–6
Win	76–32	Aug 2012	Cincinnati Open, USA (5)	ATP 1000	Hard	(Serbia) Novak Djokovic	6–0, 7–6^{(9–7)}
Loss	76–33	Oct 2012	Swiss Indoors, Switzerland	ATP 500	Hard (i)	(Argentina) Juan Martín del Potro	4–6, 7–6^{(7–5)}, 6–7^{(3–7)}
Loss	76–34	Nov 2012	ATP Finals, UK	ATP Finals	Hard (i)	(Serbia) Novak Djokovic	6–7^{(6–8)}, 5–7
Loss	76–35	May 2013	Italian Open, Italy	ATP 1000	Clay	(Spain) Rafael Nadal	1–6, 3–6
Win	77–35	Jun 2013	Halle Open, Germany (6)	ATP 250	Grass	(Russia) Mikhail Youzhny	6–7^{(5–7)}, 6–3, 6–4
Loss	77–36	Oct 2013	Swiss Indoors, Switzerland	ATP 500	Hard (i)	(Argentina) Juan Martín del Potro	6–7^{(3–7)}, 6–2, 4–6
Loss	77–37	Jan 2014	Brisbane International, Australia	ATP 250	Hard	(Australia) Lleyton Hewitt	1–6, 6–4, 3–6
Win	78–37	Mar 2014	Dubai Championships, UAE (6)	ATP 500	Hard	(Czech Republic) Tomáš Berdych	3–6, 6–4, 6–3
Loss	78–38	Mar 2014	Indian Wells Open, USA	ATP 1000	Hard	(Serbia) Novak Djokovic	6–3, 3–6, 6–7^{(3–7)}
Loss	78–39	Apr 2014	Monte-Carlo Masters, Monaco	ATP 1000	Clay	(Switzerland) Stan Wawrinka	6–4, 6–7^{(5–7)}, 2–6
Win	79–39	Jun 2014	Halle Open, Germany (7)	ATP 250	Grass	(Colombia) Alejandro Falla	7–6^{(7–2)}, 7–6^{(7–3)}
Loss	79–40	Jul 2014	Wimbledon, UK	Grand Slam	Grass	(Serbia) Novak Djokovic	7–6^{(9–7)}, 4–6, 6–7^{(4–7)}, 7–5, 4–6
Loss	79–41	Aug 2014	Canadian Open, Canada	ATP 1000	Hard	(France) Jo-Wilfried Tsonga	5–7, 6–7^{(3–7)}
Win	80–41	Aug 2014	Cincinnati Open, USA (6)	ATP 1000	Hard	(Spain) David Ferrer	6–3, 1–6, 6–2
Win	81–41	Oct 2014	Shanghai Masters, China	ATP 1000	Hard	(France) Gilles Simon	7–6^{(8–6)}, 7–6^{(7–2)}
Win	82–41	Oct 2014	Swiss Indoors, Switzerland (6)	ATP 500	Hard (i)	(Belgium) David Goffin	6–2, 6–2
Loss	82–42	Nov 2014	ATP Finals, UK	ATP Finals	Hard (i)	(Serbia) Novak Djokovic	walkover
Win	83–42	Jan 2015	Brisbane International, Australia	ATP 250	Hard	(Canada) Milos Raonic	6–4, 6–7^{(2–7)}, 6–4
Win	84–42	Feb 2015	Dubai Championships, UAE (7)	ATP 500	Hard	(Serbia) Novak Djokovic	6–3, 7–5
Loss	84–43	Mar 2015	Indian Wells Open, USA	ATP 1000	Hard	(Serbia) Novak Djokovic	3–6, 7–6^{(7–5)}, 2–6
Win	85–43	May 2015	Istanbul Open, Turkey	ATP 250	Clay	(Uruguay) Pablo Cuevas	6–3, 7–6^{(13–11)}
Loss	85–44	May 2015	Italian Open, Italy	ATP 1000	Clay	(Serbia) Novak Djokovic	4–6, 3–6
Win	86–44	Jun 2015	Halle Open, Germany (8)	ATP 500	Grass	(Italy) Andreas Seppi	7–6^{(7–1)}, 6–4
Loss	86–45	Jul 2015	Wimbledon, UK	Grand Slam	Grass	(Serbia) Novak Djokovic	6–7^{(1–7)}, 7–6^{(12–10)}, 4–6, 3–6
Win	87–45	Aug 2015	Cincinnati Open, USA (7)	ATP 1000	Hard	(Serbia) Novak Djokovic	7–6^{(7–1)}, 6–3
Loss	87–46	Sep 2015	US Open, USA	Grand Slam	Hard	(Serbia) Novak Djokovic	4–6, 7–5, 4–6, 4–6
Win	88–46	Nov 2015	Swiss Indoors, Switzerland (7)	ATP 500	Hard (i)	(Spain) Rafael Nadal	6–3, 5–7, 6–3
Loss	88–47	Nov 2015	ATP Finals, UK	ATP Finals	Hard (i)	(Serbia) Novak Djokovic	3–6, 4–6
Loss	88–48	Jan 2016	Brisbane International, Australia	ATP 250	Hard	(Canada) Milos Raonic	4–6, 4–6
Win	89–48	Jan 2017	Australian Open, Australia (5)	Grand Slam	Hard	(Spain) Rafael Nadal	6–4, 3–6, 6–1, 3–6, 6–3
Win	90–48	Mar 2017	Indian Wells Open, USA (5)	ATP 1000	Hard	(Switzerland) Stan Wawrinka	6–4, 7–5
Win	91–48	Apr 2017	Miami Open, USA (3)	ATP 1000	Hard	(Spain) Rafael Nadal	6–3, 6–4
Win	92–48	Jun 2017	Halle Open, Germany (9)	ATP 500	Grass	(Germany) Alexander Zverev	6–1, 6–3
Win	93–48	Jul 2017	Wimbledon, UK (8)	Grand Slam	Grass	(Croatia) Marin Čilić	6–3, 6–1, 6–4
Loss	93–49	Aug 2017	Canadian Open, Canada	ATP 1000	Hard	(Germany) Alexander Zverev	3–6, 4–6
Win	94–49	Oct 2017	Shanghai Masters, China (2)	ATP 1000	Hard	(Spain) Rafael Nadal	6–4, 6–3
Win	95–49	Oct 2017	Swiss Indoors, Switzerland (8)	ATP 500	Hard (i)	(Argentina) Juan Martín del Potro	6–7^{(5–7)}, 6–4, 6–3
Win	96–49	Jan 2018	Australian Open, Australia (6)	Grand Slam	Hard	(Croatia) Marin Čilić	6–2, 6–7^{(5–7)}, 6–3, 3–6, 6–1
Win	97–49	Feb 2018	Rotterdam Open, Netherlands (3)	ATP 500	Hard (i)	(Bulgaria) Grigor Dimitrov	6–2, 6–2
Loss	97–50	Mar 2018	Indian Wells Open, USA	ATP 1000	Hard	(Argentina) Juan Martín del Potro	4–6, 7–6^{(10–8)}, 6–7^{(2–7)}
Win	98–50	Jun 2018	Stuttgart Open, Germany	ATP 250	Grass	(Canada) Milos Raonic	6–4, 7–6^{(7–3)}
Loss	98–51	Jun 2018	Halle Open, Germany	ATP 500	Grass	(Croatia) Borna Ćorić	6–7^{(6–8)}, 6–3, 2–6
Loss	98–52	Aug 2018	Cincinnati Open, USA	ATP 1000	Hard	(Serbia) Novak Djokovic	4–6, 4–6
Win	99–52	Oct 2018	Swiss Indoors, Switzerland (9)	ATP 500	Hard (i)	(Romania) Marius Copil	7–6^{(7–5)}, 6–4
Win	100–52	Mar 2019	Dubai Championships, UAE (8)	ATP 500	Hard	(Greece) Stefanos Tsitsipas	6–4, 6–4
Loss	100–53	Mar 2019	Indian Wells Open, USA	ATP 1000	Hard	(Austria) Dominic Thiem	6–3, 3–6, 5–7
Win	101–53	Mar 2019	Miami Open, USA (4)	ATP 1000	Hard	(United States) John Isner	6–1, 6–4
Win	102–53	Jun 2019	Halle Open, Germany (10)	ATP 500	Grass	(Belgium) David Goffin	7–6^{(7–2)}, 6–1
Loss	102–54	Jul 2019	Wimbledon, UK	Grand Slam	Grass	(Serbia) Novak Djokovic	6–7^{(5–7)}, 6–1, 6–7^{(4–7)}, 6–4, 12–13^{(3–7)}
Win	103–54	Oct 2019	Swiss Indoors, Switzerland (10)	ATP 500	Hard (i)	(Australia) Alex de Minaur	6–2, 6–2

=== Doubles: 14 (8 titles, 6 runner-ups) ===
Legend Grand Slam tournaments (0–0) Olympic Games (1–0) Tennis Masters Cup/ ATP Tour Finals (0–0) Tennis Masters Series/ ATP Tour Masters 1000 (1–2) ATP International Series Gold/ ATP Tour 500 Series (3–1) ATP International Series/ ATP Tour 250 Series (3–3)	Finals by surface Hard (5–4) Grass (1–1) Clay (1–0) Carpet (1–1)	Finals by setting Outdoors (4–3) Indoors (4–3)

Result	W–L	Date	Tournament	Tier	Surface	Partner	Opponents	Score
Loss	0–1	Oct 2000	Swiss Indoors, Switzerland	International	Carpet (i)	(Slovakia) Dominik Hrbatý	(United States) Donald Johnson (South Africa) Piet Norval	6–7^{(11–13)}, 6–4, 6–7^{(4–7)}
Win	1–1	Feb 2001	Rotterdam Open, Netherlands	Intl. Gold	Hard (i)	(Sweden) Jonas Björkman	(Czech Republic) Petr Pála (Czech Republic) Pavel Vízner	6–3, 6–0
Win	2–1	Jul 2001	Swiss Open, Switzerland	International	Clay	(Russia) Marat Safin	(Australia) Michael Hill (United States) Jeff Tarango	0–1 retired
Win	3–1	Feb 2002	Rotterdam Open, Netherlands (2)	Intl. Gold	Hard (i)	(Belarus) Max Mirnyi	(The Bahamas) Mark Knowles (Canada) Daniel Nestor	4–6, 6–3, [10–4]
Loss	3–2	Mar 2002	Indian Wells Open, USA	Masters 1000	Hard	(Belarus) Max Mirnyi	(The Bahamas) Mark Knowles (Canada) Daniel Nestor	4–6, 4–6
Win	4–2	Oct 2002	Kremlin Cup, Russia	International	Carpet (i)	(Belarus) Max Mirnyi	(Australia) Joshua Eagle (Australia) Sandon Stolle	6–4, 7–6^{(7–0)}
Loss	4–3	Feb 2003	Rotterdam Open, Netherlands	Intl. Gold	Hard (i)	(Belarus) Max Mirnyi	(Australia) Wayne Arthurs (Australia) Paul Hanley	6–7^{(4–7)}, 2–6
Win	5–3	Mar 2003	Miami Open, USA	Masters 1000	Hard	(Belarus) Max Mirnyi	(India) Leander Paes (Czech Republic) David Rikl	7–5, 6–3
Win	6–3	Oct 2003	Vienna Open, Austria	Intl. Gold	Hard (i)	(Switzerland) Yves Allegro	(India) Mahesh Bhupathi (Belarus) Max Mirnyi	7–6^{(9–7)}, 7–5
Loss	6–4	Oct 2004	Thailand Open, Thailand	International	Hard (i)	(Switzerland) Yves Allegro	(United States) Justin Gimelstob (United States) Graydon Oliver	7–5, 4–6, 4–6
Win	7–4	Jun 2005	Halle Open, Germany	International	Grass	(Switzerland) Yves Allegro	(Sweden) Joachim Johansson (Russia) Marat Safin	7–5, 6–7^{(6–8)}, 6–3
Win	8–4	Aug 2008	Summer Olympics, China	Olympics	Hard	(Switzerland) Stan Wawrinka	(Sweden) Simon Aspelin (Sweden) Thomas Johansson	6–3, 6–4, 6–7^{(4–7)}, 6–3
Loss	8–5	Mar 2011	Indian Wells Open, USA	Masters 1000	Hard	(Switzerland) Stan Wawrinka	(Ukraine) Alexandr Dolgopolov (Belgium) Xavier Malisse	4–6, 7–6^{(7–5)}, [7–10]
Loss	8–6	Jun 2014	Halle Open, Germany	250 Series	Grass	(Switzerland) Marco Chiudinelli	(Germany) Andre Begemann (Austria) Julian Knowle	6–1, 5–7, [10–12]

== Other professional tournaments ==
=== ATP Challenger Tour career finals ===
==== Singles: 1 (1 title) ====
Result	Date	Tournament	Surface	Opponent	Score
Win	Oct 1999	Brest, France	Hard (i)	(Belarus) Max Mirnyi	7–6^{(7–4)}, 6–3

==== Doubles: 1 (1 title) ====
Result	Date	Tournament	Surface	Partner	Opponents	Score
Win	Aug 1999	Segovia Challenger, Spain	Hard	(Netherlands) Sander Groen	(Czech Republic) Ota Fukárek (Mexico) Alejandro Hernández	6–4, 7–6^{(7–5)}

=== National and international representation ===
==== Team competitions finals: 10 (8 titles, 2 runner-ups) ====
Finals by tournaments Olympic Games (1–1) Davis Cup (1–0) Laver Cup (3–1) Hopman Cup (3–0)	Finals by teams Switzerland (5–1) Europe (3–1)	Finals by surface Hard (7–1) Grass (0–1) Clay (1–0)	Finals by setting Outdoors (1–1) Indoors (7–1)

Result	Date	Tournament	Surface	Team	Partner(s) (if)	Opponent team	Opponent player(s)	Score
Win	Jan 2001	Hopman Cup, Perth, Australia	Hard (i)	Switzerland	Martina Hingis	United States	Monica Seles; Jan-Michael Gambill	2–1
Win	Aug 2008	Summer Olympics, Beijing, China	Hard	Switzerland	Stan Wawrinka	Sweden	Simon Aspelin; Thomas Johansson	3–1
Loss	Aug 2012	Summer Olympics, London, United Kingdom	Grass	Switzerland	–	Great Britain	Andy Murray	0–3
Win	Nov 2014	Davis Cup, Lille, France	Clay (i)	Switzerland	Stan Wawrinka; Marco Chiudinelli; Michael Lammer	France	Jo-Wilfried Tsonga; Gaël Monfils; Julien Benneteau; Richard Gasquet	3–1
Win	Sep 2017	Laver Cup, Prague, Czech Republic	Hard (i)	Team Europe	Rafael Nadal; Alexander Zverev; Marin Čilić; Dominic Thiem; Tomáš Berdych	Team World	Sam Querrey; John Isner; Nick Kyrgios; Jack Sock; Denis Shapovalov; Frances Tiafoe	15–9
Win	Jan 2018	Hopman Cup, Perth, Australia (2)	Hard (i)	Switzerland	Belinda Bencic	Germany	Angelique Kerber; Alexander Zverev	2–1
Win	Sep 2018	Laver Cup, Chicago, United States (2)	Hard (i)	Team Europe	Novak Djokovic; Alexander Zverev; Grigor Dimitrov; David Goffin; Kyle Edmund	Team World	Kevin Anderson; John Isner; Diego Schwartzman; Jack Sock; Nick Kyrgios; Frances Tiafoe	13–8
Win	Jan 2019	Hopman Cup, Perth, Australia (3)	Hard (i)	Switzerland	Belinda Bencic	Germany	Angelique Kerber; Alexander Zverev	2–1
Win	Sep 2019	Laver Cup, Geneva, Switzerland (3)	Hard (i)	Team Europe	Rafael Nadal; Dominic Thiem; Alexander Zverev; Stefanos Tsitsipas; Fabio Fognini	Team World	John Isner; Milos Raonic; Nick Kyrgios; Taylor Fritz; Denis Shapovalov; Jack Sock	13–11
Loss	Sep 2022	Laver Cup, London, United Kingdom	Hard (i)	Team Europe	Casper Ruud; Rafael Nadal; Stefanos Tsitsipas; Novak Djokovic; Andy Murray; Matteo Berrettini; Cameron Norrie	Team World	Taylor Fritz; Félix Auger-Aliassime; Diego Schwartzman; Frances Tiafoe; Alex de Minaur; Jack Sock	8–13

== ATP ranking ==
- Note: The ATP Tour was suspended from 16 March to 21 August 2020. The ATP ranking was frozen from 23 March to 23 August 2020.

=== ATP world No. 1 ranking ===
==== No. 1 stats ====
Category	Weeks/ Times (Years)	Ref(s)
Overall Weeks at No. 1	310	
Consecutive Weeks at No. 1 highest streak	237*	
Year-end No. 1	5 (2004, 2005, 2006, 2007, 2009)	
Year-end No. 1 consecutive streak	4 (2004–2007)	

==== Weeks at No. 1 by span ====
Time	Start date	End date	Weeks	Total
1	2 February 2004	17 August 2008	237*	237
2	6 July 2009	6 June 2010	48	285
3	9 July 2012	4 November 2012	17	302
4	19 February 2018	1 April 2018	6	308
5	14 May 2018	20 May 2018	1	309
6	18 June 2018	24 June 2018	1	310

==== Time spans holding the ranking ====
Category	Time span	Date first held No. 1	Date last held No. 1
Between first and last dates No. 1 ranking was held	14 years, 142 days*	February 2, 2004	June 24, 2018
Between first and last dates No. 1 ranking was achieved	14 years, 136 days*	February 2, 2004	June 18, 2018

==== Age at first and last dates No. 1 ranking was held ====
Birthdate	Age first held No. 1	Age last held No. 1
8 August 1981 (age 45)	22 years, 178 days	36 years, 320 days

*all-time records

==== Weeks at No. 1 by decade ====
===== 2000s =====
262

===== 2010s =====
48

=== Ranking by year ===
==== During season ====
Year	1997	1998	1999	2000	2001	2002	2003	2004	2005	2006	2007	2008	2009	2010	2011	2012	2013	2014	2015	2016	2017	2018	2019	2020	2021	2022
High	692	301	57	24	12	6	2	1	1	1	1	1	1	1	2	1	2	2	2	2	2	1	3	3	5	16
Low	806	878	302	67	30	14	6	2	1	1	1	2	2	3	4	3	7	8	3	16	17	3	7	5	16	N/A
End	704	301	64	29	13	6	2	1	1	1	1	2	1	2	3	2	6	2	3	16	2	3	3	5	16	N/A

He also has spent the total 968 non-consecutive weeks in the ATP Tour's top-10.

He first ascended into the top-10 on May 20, 2002, when he moved up from No. 14 to No. 8. Since then, he's spent:

- No. 1 – 310 weeks
- No. 2 – 218 weeks
- No. 3 – 222 weeks
- No. 4 – 54 weeks
- No. 5 – 55 weeks
- No. 6 – 38 weeks
- No. 7 – 17 weeks
- No. 8 – 25 weeks
- No. 9 – 20 weeks
- No. 10 – 9 weeks

Weeks in top	Total weeks
at number 1	310
top 5	859
top 10	968
top 20	1064
top 50	1133
top 100	1166

== Top-10 wins ==
Federer has the second-most wins over top-10 ranked players in the Open Era (behind Novak Djokovic) and is the first and only one of the two players (other being Djokovic) in the Open Era to reach 200 top-10 wins. He has a 224–123 (64.55%) record against players who were, at the time the match was played, ranked in the top 10. Federer has 10 wins over No. 1-ranked players, beating Djokovic 5 times, Nadal 3 times, Hewitt and Roddick once.

Season	1998	1999	2000	2001	2002	2003	2004	2005	2006	2007	2008	2009	2010	2011	2012	2013	2014	2015	2016	2017	2018	2019	2020	2021	2022	Total
Wins	0	1	3	5	10	9	18	15	19	17	7	15	16	10	16	4	17	15	1	14	5	7	0	0	0	224

- Key: (Rk) first use, opponent rank; (Rd) round; (Rk) 2nd use, player rank; (Ref) reference; (F) final; (SF) semifinal; (QF) quarterfinal; (#R) rounds 4, 3, 2, 1; (RR) round-robin stage; (Q#) qualifying rounds or stages (3), 2, 1.

#	Player	Rk	Event	Surface	Rd	Score	Rk
1999
1.	(Spain) Carlos Moyá	5	Marseille, France	Hard (i)	1R	7–6^{(7–1)}, 3–6, 6–3	243
2000
2.	(Germany) Nicolas Kiefer	4	London, United Kingdom	Hard (i)	1R	6–2, 6–3	66
3.	(Sweden) Magnus Norman	4	Vienna, Austria	Hard (i)	1R	4–6, 7–6^{(7–4)}, 6–4	31
4.	(Australia) Lleyton Hewitt	9	Basel, Switzerland	Carpet (i)	SF	6–4, 5–7, 7–6^{(8–6)}	34
2001
5.	(Russia) Yevgeny Kafelnikov	7	Milan, Italy	Carpet (i)	SF	6–2, 6–7^{(4–7)}, 6–3	21
6.	(Spain) Àlex Corretja	8	Rotterdam, Netherlands	Hard (i)	QF	6–4, 6–2	23
7.	(France) Arnaud Clément	10	Davis Cup, Neuchâtel, Switzerland	Carpet (i)	RR	6–4, 3–6, 7–6^{(7–5)}, 6–4	21
8.	(Russia) Marat Safin	2	Rome, Italy	Clay	2R	4–6, 6–4, 7–6^{(7–5)}	18
9.	(United States) Pete Sampras	6	Wimbledon, London	Grass	4R	7–6^{(9–7)}, 5–7, 6–4, 6–7^{(2–7)}, 7–5	15
2002
10.	(Russia) Marat Safin	7	Davis Cup, Moscow, Russia	Clay (i)	RR	7–5, 6–1, 6–2	13
11.	(Russia) Yevgeny Kafelnikov	4	Davis Cup, Moscow, Russia	Clay (i)	RR	7–6^{(8–6)}, 6–1, 6–1	13
12.	(United Kingdom) Tim Henman	6	Miami, United States	Hard	4R	6–2, ret.	14
13.	(Australia) Lleyton Hewitt	1	Miami, United States	Hard	SF	6–3, 6–4	14
14.	(Brazil) Gustavo Kuerten	7	Hamburg, Germany	Clay	QF	6–0, 1–6, 6–2	14
15.	(Russia) Marat Safin	5	Hamburg, Germany	Clay	F	6–1, 6–3, 6–4	14
16.	(Spain) Carlos Moyá	9	Vienna, Austria	Hard (i)	SF	6–2, 6–3	13
17.	(Germany) Tommy Haas	7	Paris, France	Carpet (i)	3R	6–2, 7–6^{(7–2)}	8
18.	(Spain) Juan Carlos Ferrero	4	Tennis Masters Cup, Shanghai	Hard (i)	RR	6–3, 6–4	6
19.	(Czech Republic) Jiří Novák	7	Tennis Masters Cup, Shanghai	Hard (i)	RR	6–0, 4–6, 6–2	6
2003
20.	(Czech Republic) Jiří Novák	10	Dubai, United Arab Emirates	Hard	F	6–1, 7–6^{(7–2)}	5
21.	(Spain) Juan Carlos Ferrero	3	Rome, Italy	Clay	SF	6–4, 4–2 ret.	5
22.	(United States) Andy Roddick	6	Wimbledon, London	Grass	SF	7–6^{(8–6)}, 6–3, 6–3	5
23.	(Spain) Carlos Moyá	7	Vienna, Austria	Hard (i)	F	6–3, 6–3, 6–3	3
24.	(United States) Andre Agassi	5	Tennis Masters Cup, Houston, United States	Hard	RR	6–7^{(3–7)}, 6–3, 7–6^{(9–7)}	3
25.	(Argentina) David Nalbandian	8	Tennis Masters Cup, Houston	Hard	RR	6–3, 6–0	3
26.	(Spain) Juan Carlos Ferrero	2	Tennis Masters Cup, Houston	Hard	RR	6–3, 6–1	3
27.	(United States) Andy Roddick	1	Tennis Masters Cup, Houston	Hard	SF	7–6^{(7–2)}, 6–2	3
28.	(United States) Andre Agassi	5	Tennis Masters Cup, Houston	Hard	F	6–3, 6–0, 6–4	3
2004
29.	(Argentina) David Nalbandian	8	Australian Open, Melbourne	Hard	QF	7–5, 6–4, 5–7, 6–3	2
30.	(Spain) Juan Carlos Ferrero	3	Australian Open, Melbourne	Hard	SF	6–4, 6–1, 6–4	2
31.	(United States) Andre Agassi	5	Indian Wells, United States	Hard	SF	4–6, 6–3, 6–4	1
32.	(United Kingdom) Tim Henman	10	Indian Wells, United States	Hard	F	6–3, 6–3	1
33.	(Spain) Carlos Moyá	8	Hamburg, Germany	Clay	QF	6–4, 6–3	1
34.	(Argentina) Guillermo Coria	3	Hamburg, Germany	Clay	F	4–6, 6–4, 6–2, 6–3	1
35.	(Australia) Lleyton Hewitt	10	Wimbledon, London	Grass	QF	6–1, 6–7^{(1–7)}, 6–0, 6–4	1
36.	(United States) Andy Roddick	2	Wimbledon, London	Grass	F	4–6, 7–5, 7–6^{(7–3)}, 6–4	1
37.	(United States) Andy Roddick	2	Toronto, Canada	Hard	F	7–5, 6–3	1
38.	(United States) Andre Agassi	7	US Open, New York	Hard	QF	6–3, 2–6, 7–5, 3–6, 6–3	1
39.	(United Kingdom) Tim Henman	6	US Open, New York	Hard	SF	6–3, 6–4, 6–4	1
40.	(Australia) Lleyton Hewitt	5	US Open, New York	Hard	F	6–0, 7–6^{(7–3)}, 6–0	1
41.	(United States) Andy Roddick	2	Bangkok, Thailand	Hard (i)	F	6–4, 6–0	1
42.	(Argentina) Gastón Gaudio	10	Tennis Masters Cup, Houston	Hard	RR	6–1, 7–6^{(7–4)}	1
43.	(Australia) Lleyton Hewitt	3	Tennis Masters Cup, Houston	Hard	RR	6–3, 6–4	1
44.	(Spain) Carlos Moyá	5	Tennis Masters Cup, Houston	Hard	RR	6–3, 3–6, 6–3	1
45.	(Russia) Marat Safin	4	Tennis Masters Cup, Houston	Hard	SF	6–3, 7–6^{(20–18)}	1
46.	(Australia) Lleyton Hewitt	3	Tennis Masters Cup, Houston	Hard	F	6–3, 6–2	1
2005
47.	(United States) Andre Agassi	8	Australian Open, Melbourne	Hard	QF	6–3, 6–4, 6–4	1
48.	(United States) Andre Agassi	10	Dubai, United Arab Emirates	Hard	SF	6–3, 6–1	1
49.	(Australia) Lleyton Hewitt	2	Indian Wells, United States	Hard	F	6–2, 6–4, 6–4	1
50.	(United Kingdom) Tim Henman	7	Miami, United States	Hard	QF	6–4, 6–2	1
51.	(United States) Andre Agassi	10	Miami, United States	Hard	SF	6–4, 6–3	1
52.	(Argentina) Guillermo Coria	8	Hamburg, Germany	Clay	QF	6–4, 7–6^{(7–3)}	1
53.	(Russia) Marat Safin	5	Halle, Germany	Grass	F	6–4, 6–7^{(6–8)}, 6–4	1
54.	(Australia) Lleyton Hewitt	2	Wimbledon, London	Grass	SF	6–3, 6–4, 7–6^{(7–4)}	1
55.	(United States) Andy Roddick	4	Wimbledon, London	Grass	F	6–2, 7–6^{(7–2)}, 6–4	1
56.	(United States) Andy Roddick	5	Cincinnati, United States	Hard	F	6–3, 7–5	1
57.	(Australia) Lleyton Hewitt	4	US Open, New York	Hard	SF	6–3, 7–6^{(7–0)}, 4–6, 6–3	1
58.	(United States) Andre Agassi	7	US Open, New York	Hard	F	6–3, 2–6, 7–6^{(7–1)}, 6–1	1
59.	(Croatia) Ivan Ljubičić	8	Tennis Masters Cup, Shanghai	Carpet (i)	RR	6–3, 2–6, 7–6^{(7–4)}	1
60.	(Argentina) Guillermo Coria	6	Tennis Masters Cup, Shanghai	Carpet (i)	RR	6–0, 1–6, 6–2	1
61.	(Argentina) Gastón Gaudio	9	Tennis Masters Cup, Shanghai	Carpet (i)	SF	6–0, 6–0	1
2006
62.	(Russia) Nikolay Davydenko	5	Australian Open, Melbourne	Hard	QF	6–4, 3–6, 7–6^{(9–7)}, 7–6^{(7–5)}	1
63.	(Croatia) Ivan Ljubičić	6	Indian Wells, United States	Hard	QF	6–2, 6–3	1
64.	(United States) James Blake	9	Miami, United States	Hard	QF	7–6^{(7–2)}, 6–4	1
65.	(Croatia) Ivan Ljubičić	6	Miami, United States	Hard	F	7–6^{(7–5)}, 7–6^{(7–4)}, 7–6^{(8–6)}	1
66.	(Argentina) David Nalbandian	3	Rome, Italy	Clay	SF	6–3, 3–6, 7–6^{(7–5)}	1
67.	(Argentina) David Nalbandian	3	French Open, Paris	Clay	SF	3–6, 6–4, 5–2 ret.	1
68.	(Croatia) Mario Ančić	10	Wimbledon, London	Grass	QF	6–4, 6–4, 6–4	1
69.	(Spain) Rafael Nadal	2	Wimbledon, London	Grass	F	6–0, 7–6^{(7–5)}, 6–7^{(2–7)}, 6–3	1
70.	(United States) James Blake	7	US Open, New York	Hard	QF	7–6^{(9–7)}, 6–0, 6–7^{(9–11)}, 6–4	1
71.	(Russia) Nikolay Davydenko	6	US Open, New York	Hard	SF	6–1, 7–5, 6–4	1
72.	(United States) Andy Roddick	10	US Open, New York	Hard	F	6–2, 4–6, 7–5, 6–1	1
73.	(Argentina) David Nalbandian	4	Madrid, Spain	Hard (i)	SF	6–4, 6–0	1
74.	(Chile) Fernando González	10	Madrid, Spain	Hard (i)	F	7–5, 6–1, 6–0	1
75.	(Chile) Fernando González	7	Basel, Switzerland	Carpet (i)	F	6–3, 6–2, 7–6^{(7–3)}	1
76.	(Argentina) David Nalbandian	7	Tennis Masters Cup, Shanghai	Hard (i)	RR	3–6, 6–1, 6–1	1
77.	(United States) Andy Roddick	5	Tennis Masters Cup, Shanghai	Hard (i)	RR	4–6, 7–6^{(10–8)}, 6–4	1
78.	(Croatia) Ivan Ljubičić	4	Tennis Masters Cup, Shanghai	Hard (i)	RR	7–6^{(7–2)}, 6–4	1
79.	(Spain) Rafael Nadal	2	Tennis Masters Cup, Shanghai	Hard (i)	SF	6–4, 7–5	1
80.	(United States) James Blake	8	Tennis Masters Cup, Shanghai	Hard (i)	F	6–0, 6–3, 6–4	1
2007
81.	(Spain) Tommy Robredo	6	Australian Open, Melbourne	Hard	QF	6–3, 7–6^{(7–2)}, 7–5	1
82.	(United States) Andy Roddick	7	Australian Open, Melbourne	Hard	SF	6–4, 6–0, 6–2	1
83.	(Chile) Fernando González	9	Australian Open, Melbourne	Hard	F	7–6^{(7–2)}, 6–4, 6–4	1
84.	(Germany) Tommy Haas	9	Dubai, United Arab Emirates	Hard	SF	6–4, 7–5	1
85.	(Spain) Rafael Nadal	2	Hamburg, Germany	Clay	F	2–6, 6–2, 6–0	1
86.	(Spain) Tommy Robredo	9	French Open, Paris	Clay	QF	7–5, 1–6, 6–1, 6–2	1
87.	(Russia) Nikolay Davydenko	4	French Open, Paris	Clay	SF	7–5, 7–6^{(7–5)}, 7–6^{(9–7)}	1
88.	(Spain) Rafael Nadal	2	Wimbledon, London	Grass	F	7–6^{(9–7)}, 4–6, 7–6^{(7–3)}, 2–6, 6–2	1
89.	(United States) James Blake	8	Cincinnati, United States	Hard	F	6–1, 6–4	1
90.	(United States) Andy Roddick	5	US Open, New York	Hard	QF	7–6^{(7–5)}, 7–6^{(7–4)}, 6–2	1
91.	(Russia) Nikolay Davydenko	4	US Open, New York	Hard	SF	7–5, 6–1, 7–5	1
92.	(Serbia) Novak Djokovic	3	US Open, New York	Hard	F	7–6^{(7–4)}, 7–6^{(7–2)}, 6–4	1
93.	(Czech Republic) Tomáš Berdych	10	Davis Cup, Prague, Czech Republic	Hard (i)	RR	7–6^{(7–5)}, 7–6^{(12–10)}, 6–3	1
94.	(Russia) Nikolay Davydenko	4	Tennis Masters Cup, Shanghai	Hard (i)	RR	6–4, 6–3	1
95.	(United States) Andy Roddick	5	Tennis Masters Cup, Shanghai	Hard (i)	RR	6–4, 6–2	1
96.	(Spain) Rafael Nadal	2	Tennis Masters Cup, Shanghai	Hard (i)	SF	6–4, 6–1	1
97.	(Spain) David Ferrer	6	Tennis Masters Cup, Shanghai	Hard (i)	F	6–2, 6–3, 6–2	1
2008
98.	(Russia) Nikolay Davydenko	4	Estoril, Portugal	Clay	F	7–6^{(7–5)}, 1–2, ret.	1
99.	(Argentina) David Nalbandian	7	Monte Carlo, Monaco	Clay	QF	5–7, 6–2, 6–2	1
100.	(Serbia) Novak Djokovic	3	Monte Carlo, Monaco	Clay	SF	6–3, 3–2 ret.	1
101.	(Serbia) Novak Djokovic	3	US Open, New York	Hard	SF	6–3, 5–7, 7–5, 6–2	2
102.	(United Kingdom) Andy Murray	6	US Open, New York	Hard	F	6–2, 7–5, 6–2	2
103.	(Argentina) Juan Martín del Potro	9	Madrid, Spain	Hard (i)	QF	6–3, 6–3	2
104.	(Argentina) David Nalbandian	8	Basel, Switzerland	Hard (i)	F	6–3, 6–4	2
2009
105.	(Argentina) Juan Martín del Potro	6	Australian Open, Melbourne	Hard	QF	6–3, 6–0, 6–0	2
106.	(United States) Andy Roddick	9	Australian Open, Melbourne	Hard	SF	6–2, 7–5, 7–5	2
107.	(Spain) Fernando Verdasco	10	Indian Wells, United States	Hard	QF	6–3, 7–6^{(7–5)}	2
108.	(United States) Andy Roddick	6	Miami, United States	Hard	QF	6–3, 4–6, 6–4	2
109.	(United States) Andy Roddick	6	Madrid, Spain	Clay	QF	7–5, 6–7^{(5–7)}, 6–1	2
110.	(Argentina) Juan Martín del Potro	5	Madrid, Spain	Clay	SF	6–3, 6–4	2
111.	(Spain) Rafael Nadal	1	Madrid, Spain	Clay	F	6–4, 6–4	2
112.	(France) Gaël Monfils	10	French Open, Paris	Clay	QF	7–6^{(8–6)}, 6–2, 6–4	2
113.	(Argentina) Juan Martín del Potro	5	French Open, Paris	Clay	SF	3–6, 7–6^{(7–2)}, 2–6, 6–1, 6–4	2
114.	(United States) Andy Roddick	6	Wimbledon, London	Grass	F	5–7, 7–6^{(8–6)}, 7–6^{(7–5)}, 3–6, 16–14	2
115.	(United Kingdom) Andy Murray	2	Cincinnati, United States	Hard	SF	6–2, 7–6^{(10–8)}	1
116.	(Serbia) Novak Djokovic	4	Cincinnati, United States	Hard	F	6–1, 7–5	1
117.	(Serbia) Novak Djokovic	4	US Open, New York	Hard	SF	7–6^{(7–3)}, 7–5, 7–5	1
118.	(Spain) Fernando Verdasco	8	ATP World Tour Finals, London	Hard (i)	RR	4–6, 7–5, 6–1	1
119.	(United Kingdom) Andy Murray	4	ATP World Tour Finals, London	Hard (i)	RR	3–6, 6–3, 6–1	1
2010
120.	(Russia) Nikolay Davydenko	6	Australian Open, Melbourne	Hard	QF	2–6, 6–3, 6–0, 7–5	1
121.	(France) Jo-Wilfried Tsonga	10	Australian Open, Melbourne	Hard	SF	6–2, 6–3, 6–2	1
122.	(United Kingdom) Andy Murray	4	Australian Open, Melbourne	Hard	F	6–3, 6–4, 7–6^{(13–11)}	1
123.	(Czech Republic) Tomáš Berdych	7	Toronto, Canada	Hard	QF	6–3, 5–7, 7–6^{(7–5)}	3
124.	(Serbia) Novak Djokovic	2	Toronto, Canada	Hard	SF	6–1, 3–6, 7–5	3
125.	(Russia) Nikolay Davydenko	6	Cincinnati, United States	Hard	QF	6–4, 7–5	2
126.	(Sweden) Robin Söderling	5	US Open, New York	Hard	QF	6–4, 6–4, 7–5	2
127.	(Sweden) Robin Söderling	5	Shanghai, China	Hard	QF	6–1, 6–1	3
128.	(Serbia) Novak Djokovic	2	Shanghai, China	Hard	SF	7–5, 6–4	3
129.	(United States) Andy Roddick	9	Basel, Switzerland	Hard (i)	SF	6–2, 6–4	2
130.	(Serbia) Novak Djokovic	3	Basel, Switzerland	Hard (i)	F	6–4, 3–6, 6–1	2
131.	(Spain) David Ferrer	7	ATP World Tour Finals, London	Hard (i)	RR	6–1, 6–4	2
132.	(United Kingdom) Andy Murray	5	ATP World Tour Finals, London	Hard (i)	RR	6–4, 6–2	2
133.	(Sweden) Robin Söderling	4	ATP World Tour Finals, London	Hard (i)	RR	7–6^{(7–5)}, 6–3	2
134.	(Serbia) Novak Djokovic	3	ATP World Tour Finals, London	Hard (i)	SF	6–1, 6–4	2
135.	(Spain) Rafael Nadal	1	ATP World Tour Finals, London	Hard (i)	F	6–3, 3–6, 6–1	2
2011
136.	(Sweden) Robin Söderling	5	Madrid, Spain	Clay	QF	7–6^{(7–2)}, 6–4	3
137.	(France) Gaël Monfils	9	French Open, Paris	Clay	QF	6–4, 6–3, 7–6^{(7–3)}	3
138.	(Serbia) Novak Djokovic	2	French Open, Paris	Clay	SF	7–6^{(7–5)}, 6–3, 3–6, 7–6^{(7–5)}	3
139.	(Czech Republic) Tomáš Berdych	7	Paris, France	Hard (i)	SF	6–4, 6–3	4
140.	(France) Jo-Wilfried Tsonga	8	Paris, France	Hard (i)	F	6–1, 7–6^{(7–3)}	4
141.	(France) Jo-Wilfried Tsonga	6	ATP World Tour Finals, London	Hard (i)	RR	6–2, 2–6, 6–4	4
142.	(Spain) Rafael Nadal	2	ATP World Tour Finals, London	Hard (i)	RR	6–3, 6–0	4
143.	(United States) Mardy Fish	8	ATP World Tour Finals, London	Hard (i)	RR	6–1, 3–6, 6–3	4
144.	(Spain) David Ferrer	5	ATP World Tour Finals, London	Hard (i)	SF	7–5, 6–3	4
145.	(France) Jo-Wilfried Tsonga	6	ATP World Tour Finals, London	Hard (i)	F	6–3, 6–7^{(6–8)}, 6–3	4
2012
146.	(Argentina) Juan Martín del Potro	10	Rotterdam, Netherlands	Hard (i)	F	6–1, 6–4	3
147.	(Argentina) Juan Martín del Potro	10	Dubai, United Arab Emirates	Hard	SF	7–6^{(7–5)}, 7–6^{(8–6)}	3
148.	(United Kingdom) Andy Murray	4	Dubai, United Arab Emirates	Hard	F	7–5, 6–4	3
149.	(Argentina) Juan Martín del Potro	9	Indian Wells, United States	Hard	QF	6–3, 6–2	3
150.	(Spain) Rafael Nadal	2	Indian Wells, United States	Hard	SF	6–3, 6–4	3
151.	(Spain) David Ferrer	6	Madrid, Spain	Clay	QF	6–4, 6–4	3
152.	(Serbia) Janko Tipsarević	8	Madrid, Spain	Clay	SF	6–2, 6–3	3
153.	(Czech Republic) Tomáš Berdych	7	Madrid, Spain	Clay	F	3–6, 7–5, 7–5	3
154.	(Argentina) Juan Martín del Potro	9	French Open, Paris	Clay	QF	3–6, 6–7^{(4–7)}, 6–2, 6–0, 6–3	3
155.	(Serbia) Novak Djokovic	1	Wimbledon, London	Grass	SF	6–3, 3–6, 6–4, 6–3	3
156.	(United Kingdom) Andy Murray	4	Wimbledon, London	Grass	F	4–6, 7–5, 6–3, 6–4	3
157.	(Argentina) Juan Martín del Potro	9	Olympics, London	Grass	SF	3–6, 7–6^{(7–5)}, 19–17	1
158.	(Serbia) Novak Djokovic	2	Cincinnati, United States	Hard	F	6–0, 7–6^{(9–7)}	1
159.	(Serbia) Janko Tipsarević	9	ATP World Tour Finals, London	Hard (i)	RR	6–3, 6–1	2
160.	(Spain) David Ferrer	5	ATP World Tour Finals, London	Hard (i)	RR	6–4, 7–6^{(7–5)}	2
161.	(United Kingdom) Andy Murray	3	ATP World Tour Finals, London	Hard (i)	SF	7–6^{(7–5)}, 6–2	2
2013
162.	(France) Jo-Wilfried Tsonga	8	Australian Open, Melbourne	Hard	QF	7–6^{(7–4)}, 4–6, 7–6^{(7–4)}, 3–6, 6–3	2
163.	(Argentina) Juan Martín del Potro	5	Paris, France	Hard (i)	QF	6–3, 4–6, 6–3	6
164.	(France) Richard Gasquet	9	ATP World Tour Finals, London	Hard (i)	RR	6–4, 6–3	7
165.	(Argentina) Juan Martín del Potro	5	ATP World Tour Finals, London	Hard (i)	RR	4–6, 7–6^{(7–2)}, 7–5	7
2014
166.	(France) Jo-Wilfried Tsonga	10	Australian Open, Melbourne	Hard	4R	6–3, 7–5, 6–4	6
167.	(United Kingdom) Andy Murray	4	Australian Open, Melbourne	Hard	QF	6–3, 6–4, 6–7^{(6–8)}, 6–3	6
168.	(Serbia) Novak Djokovic	2	Dubai, United Arab Emirates	Hard	SF	3–6, 6–3, 6–2	8
169.	(Czech Republic) Tomáš Berdych	6	Dubai, United Arab Emirates	Hard	F	3–6, 6–4, 6–3	8
170.	(France) Richard Gasquet	9	Miami, United States	Hard	4R	6–1, 6–2	5
171.	(Serbia) Novak Djokovic	2	Monte Carlo, Monaco	Clay	SF	7–5, 6–2	4
172.	(Switzerland) Stan Wawrinka	3	Wimbledon, London	Grass	QF	3–6, 7–6^{(7–5)}, 6–4, 6–4	4
173.	(Canada) Milos Raonic	9	Wimbledon, London	Grass	SF	6–4, 6–4, 6–4	4
174.	(Spain) David Ferrer	7	Toronto, Canada	Hard	QF	6–3, 4–6, 6–3	3
175.	(United Kingdom) Andy Murray	9	Cincinnati, United States	Hard	QF	6–3, 7–5	3
176.	(Canada) Milos Raonic	7	Cincinnati, United States	Hard	SF	6–2, 6–3	3
177.	(Spain) David Ferrer	6	Cincinnati, United States	Hard	F	6–3, 1–6, 6–2	3
178.	(Serbia) Novak Djokovic	1	Shanghai, China	Hard	SF	6–4, 6–4	3
179.	(Canada) Milos Raonic	8	ATP World Tour Finals, London	Hard (i)	RR	6–1, 7–6^{(7–0)}	2
180.	(Japan) Kei Nishikori	5	ATP World Tour Finals, London	Hard (i)	RR	6–3, 6–2	2
181.	(United Kingdom) Andy Murray	6	ATP World Tour Finals, London	Hard (i)	RR	6–0, 6–1	2
182.	(Switzerland) Stan Wawrinka	4	ATP World Tour Finals, London	Hard (i)	SF	4–6, 7–5, 7–6^{(8–6)}	2
2015
183.	(Canada) Milos Raonic	8	Brisbane, Australia	Hard	F	6–4, 6–7^{(2–7)}, 6–4	2
184.	(Serbia) Novak Djokovic	1	Dubai, United Arab Emirates	Hard	F	6–3, 7–5	2
185.	(Czech Republic) Tomáš Berdych	9	Indian Wells, United States	Hard	QF	6–4, 6–0	2
186.	(Canada) Milos Raonic	6	Indian Wells, United States	Hard	SF	7–5, 6–4	2
187.	(Czech Republic) Tomáš Berdych	5	Rome, Italy	Clay	QF	6–3, 6–3	2
188.	(Switzerland) Stan Wawrinka	9	Rome, Italy	Clay	SF	6–4, 6–2	2
189.	(United Kingdom) Andy Murray	3	Wimbledon, London	Grass	SF	7–5, 7–5, 6–4	2
190.	(United Kingdom) Andy Murray	2	Cincinnati, United States	Hard	SF	6–4, 7–6^{(8–6)}	3
191.	(Serbia) Novak Djokovic	1	Cincinnati, United States	Hard	F	7–6^{(7–1)}, 6–3	3
192.	(Switzerland) Stan Wawrinka	5	US Open, New York	Hard	SF	6–4, 6–3, 6–1	2
193.	(Spain) Rafael Nadal	7	Basel, Switzerland	Hard (i)	F	6–3, 5–7, 6–3	3
194.	(Czech Republic) Tomáš Berdych	6	ATP World Tour Finals, London	Hard (i)	RR	6–4, 6–2	3
195.	(Serbia) Novak Djokovic	1	ATP World Tour Finals, London	Hard (i)	RR	7–5, 6–2	3
196.	(Japan) Kei Nishikori	8	ATP World Tour Finals, London	Hard (i)	RR	7–5, 4–6, 6–4	3
197.	(Switzerland) Stan Wawrinka	4	ATP World Tour Finals, London	Hard (i)	SF	7–5, 6–3	3
2016
198.	(Czech Republic) Tomáš Berdych	6	Australian Open, Melbourne	Hard	QF	7–6^{(7–4)}, 6–2, 6–4	3
2017
199.	(Czech Republic) Tomáš Berdych	10	Australian Open, Melbourne	Hard	3R	6–2, 6–4, 6–4	17
200.	(Japan) Kei Nishikori	5	Australian Open, Melbourne	Hard	4R	6–7^{(4–7)}, 6–4, 6–1, 4–6, 6–3	17
201.	(Switzerland) Stan Wawrinka	4	Australian Open, Melbourne	Hard	SF	7–5, 6–3, 1–6, 4–6, 6–3	17
202.	(Spain) Rafael Nadal	9	Australian Open, Melbourne	Hard	F	6–4, 3–6, 6–1, 3–6, 6–3	17
203.	(Spain) Rafael Nadal	6	Indian Wells, United States	Hard	4R	6–2, 6–3	10
204.	(Switzerland) Stan Wawrinka	3	Indian Wells, United States	Hard	F	6–4, 7–5	10
205.	(Spain) Rafael Nadal	7	Miami, United States	Hard	F	6–3, 6–4	6
206.	(Canada) Milos Raonic	7	Wimbledon, London	Grass	QF	6–4, 6–2, 7–6^{(7–4)}	5
207.	(Croatia) Marin Čilić	6	Wimbledon, London	Grass	F	6–3, 6–1, 6–4	5
208.	(Spain) Rafael Nadal	1	Shanghai, China	Hard	F	6–4, 6–3	2
209.	(Belgium) David Goffin	10	Basel, Switzerland	Hard (i)	SF	6–1, 6–2	2
210.	(United States) Jack Sock	9	ATP Finals, London	Hard (i)	RR	6–4, 7–6^{(7–4)}	2
211.	(Germany) Alexander Zverev	3	ATP Finals, London	Hard (i)	RR	7–6^{(8–6)}, 5–7, 6–1	2
212.	(Croatia) Marin Čilić	5	ATP Finals, London	Hard (i)	RR	6–7^{(5–7)}, 6–4, 6–1	2
2018
213.	(Croatia) Marin Čilić	6	Australian Open, Melbourne	Hard	F	6–2, 6–7^{(5–7)}, 6–3, 3–6, 6–1	2
214.	(Bulgaria) Grigor Dimitrov	5	Rotterdam, Netherlands	Hard (i)	F	6–2, 6–2	2
215.	(United States) John Isner	10	Laver Cup, Chicago, United States	Hard (i)	RR	6–7^{(5–7)}, 7–6^{(8–6)}, [10–7]	2
216.	(Austria) Dominic Thiem	8	ATP Finals, London	Hard (i)	RR	6–2, 6–3	3
217.	(South Africa) Kevin Anderson	6	ATP Finals, London	Hard (i)	RR	6–4, 6–3	3
2019
218.	(South Africa) Kevin Anderson	7	Miami, United States	Hard	QF	6–0, 6–4	5
219.	(United States) John Isner	9	Miami, United States	Hard	F	6–1, 6–4	5
220.	(Japan) Kei Nishikori	7	Wimbledon, London	Grass	QF	4–6, 6–1, 6–4, 6–4	3
221.	(Spain) Rafael Nadal	2	Wimbledon, London	Grass	SF	7–6^{(7–3)}, 1–6, 6–3, 6–4	3
222.	(Greece) Stefanos Tsitsipas	7	Basel, Switzerland	Hard (i)	SF	6–4, 6–4	3
223.	(Italy) Matteo Berrettini	8	ATP Finals, London	Hard (i)	RR	7–6^{(7–2)}, 6–3	3
224.	(Serbia) Novak Djokovic	2	ATP Finals, London	Hard (i)	RR	6–4, 6–3	3

== Winning streaks ==
Federer holds nine winning streaks of eighteen matches or more and seven winning streaks of twenty matches or more with his two longest among the top 10 of the era.

=== 41-match win streak 2006–2007 ===
This is the seventh longest all-surface streak of the Open Era.

No.	Tournament	Start date (tournament)	Surface	Opponent	Rank	Rd	Score
–	Cincinnati, United States	14 August 2006	Hard	(United Kingdom) Andy Murray	21	2R	5–7, 4–6
1	US Open, United States	28 August 2006	Hard	(Taiwan) Jimmy Wang	109	1R	6–4, 6–1, 6–0
2	US Open, United States	28 August 2006	Hard	(United Kingdom) Tim Henman	62	2R	6–3, 6–4, 7–5
3	US Open, United States	28 August 2006	Hard	(United States) Vincent Spadea	84	3R	6–3, 6–3, 6–0
4	US Open, United States	28 August 2006	Hard	(France) Marc Gicquel	79	4R	6–3, 7–6^{(7–2)}, 6–3
5	US Open, United States	28 August 2006	Hard	(United States) James Blake	7	QF	7–6^{(9–7)}, 6–0, 6–7^{(9–11)}, 6–4
6	US Open, United States	28 August 2006	Hard	(Russia) Nikolay Davydenko	6	SF	6–1, 7–5, 6–4
7	US Open, United States	28 August 2006	Hard	(United States) Andy Roddick	10	F	6–2, 4–6, 7–5, 6–1
8	Davis Cup, Switzerland	22 September 2006	Hard (i)	(Serbia) Janko Tipsarević	92	RR	6–3, 6–2, 6–2
9	Davis Cup, Switzerland	22 September 2006	Hard (i)	(Serbia) Novak Djokovic	21	RR	6–3, 6–2, 6–3
10	Tokyo, Japan	2 October 2006	Hard	(Serbia) Viktor Troicki	276	2R	7–6^{(7–2)}, 7–6^{(7–3)}
11	Tokyo, Japan	2 October 2006	Hard	(South Africa) Wesley Moodie	73	3R	6–2, 6–1
12	Tokyo, Japan	2 October 2006	Hard	(Japan) Takao Suzuki	1,078	QF	4–6, 7–5, 7–6^{(7–3)}
13	Tokyo, Japan	2 October 2006	Hard	(Germany) Benjamin Becker	72	SF	6–3, 6–4
14	Tokyo, Japan	2 October 2006	Hard	(United Kingdom) Tim Henman (2)	55	F	6–3, 6–3
15	Madrid, Spain	16 October 2006	Hard (i)	(Chile) Nicolás Massú	45	2R	6–3, 6–2
16	Madrid, Spain	16 October 2006	Hard (i)	(Sweden) Robin Söderling	29	3R	7–6^{(7–5)}, 7–6^{(10–8)}
17	Madrid, Spain	16 October 2006	Hard (i)	(United States) Robby Ginepri	47	QF	6–3, 7–6^{(7–4)}
18	Madrid, Spain	16 October 2006	Hard (i)	(Argentina) David Nalbandian	4	SF	6–4, 6–0
19	Madrid, Spain	16 October 2006	Hard (i)	(Chile) Fernando González	10	F	7–5, 6–1, 6–0
20	Basel, Switzerland	23 October 2006	Carpet (i)	(Czech Republic) Tomáš Zíb	151	1R	6–1, 6–2
21	Basel, Switzerland	23 October 2006	Carpet (i)	(Spain) Guillermo García López	75	2R	6–2, 6–0
22	Basel, Switzerland	23 October 2006	Carpet (i)	(Spain) David Ferrer	15	QF	6–3, 7–6^{(16–14)}
23	Basel, Switzerland	23 October 2006	Carpet (i)	(Thailand) Paradorn Srichaphan	54	SF	6–4, 3–6, 7–6^{(7–5)}
24	Basel, Switzerland	23 October 2006	Carpet (i)	(Chile) Fernando González (2)	7	F	6–3, 6–2, 7–6^{(7–3)}
25	Shanghai, China	13 November 2006	Hard (i)	(Argentina) David Nalbandian (2)	7	RR	3–6, 6–1, 6–1
26	Shanghai, China	13 November 2006	Hard (i)	(United States) Andy Roddick (2)	5	RR	4–6, 7–6^{(10–8)}, 6–4
27	Shanghai, China	13 November 2006	Hard (i)	(Croatia) Ivan Ljubičić	4	RR	7–6^{(7–2)}, 6–4
28	Shanghai, China	13 November 2006	Hard (i)	(Spain) Rafael Nadal	2	SF	6–4, 7–5
29	Shanghai, China	13 November 2006	Hard (i)	(United States) James Blake (2)	8	F	6–0, 6–3, 6–4
30	Australian Open, Australia	15 January 2007	Hard	(Germany) Björn Phau	82	1R	7–5, 6–0, 6–4
31	Australian Open, Australia	15 January 2007	Hard	(Sweden) Jonas Björkman	50	2R	6–2, 6–3, 6–2
32	Australian Open, Australia	15 January 2007	Hard	(Russia) Mikhail Youzhny	25	3R	6–3, 6–3, 7–6^{(7–5)}
33	Australian Open, Australia	15 January 2007	Hard	(Serbia) Novak Djokovic (2)	15	4R	6–2, 7–5, 6–3
34	Australian Open, Australia	15 January 2007	Hard	(Spain) Tommy Robredo	6	QF	6–3, 7–6^{(7–2)}, 7–5
35	Australian Open, Australia	15 January 2007	Hard	(United States) Andy Roddick (3)	7	SF	6–4, 6–0, 6–2
36	Australian Open, Australia	15 January 2007	Hard	(Chile) Fernando González (3)	9	F	7–6^{(7–2)}, 6–4, 6–4
37	Dubai, United Arab Emirates	26 February 2007	Hard	(Denmark) Kristian Pless	86	1R	7–6^{(7–2)}, 3–6, 6–3
38	Dubai, United Arab Emirates	26 February 2007	Hard	(Italy) Daniele Bracciali	88	2R	7–5, 6–3
39	Dubai, United Arab Emirates	26 February 2007	Hard	(Serbia) Novak Djokovic (3)	14	QF	6–3, 6–7^{(6–8)}, 6–3
40	Dubai, United Arab Emirates	26 February 2007	Hard	(Germany) Tommy Haas	9	SF	6–4, 7–5
41	Dubai, United Arab Emirates	26 February 2007	Hard	(Russia) Mikhail Youzhny (2)	18	F	6–4, 6–3
–	Indian Wells, United States	5 March 2007	Hard	(Argentina) Guillermo Cañas	60	2R	5–7, 2–6

=== 35-match win streak 2005 ===
This is tied for eighth longest all-surface streak of the Open Era.

No.	Tournament	Start date (tournament)	Surface	Opponent	Rank	Rd	Score
–	Paris, France	23 May 2005	Clay	(Spain) Rafael Nadal	6	SF	3–6, 6–4, 4–6, 3–6
1	Halle, Germany	6 June 2005	Grass	(Sweden) Robin Söderling	35	1R	6–7^{(5–7)}, 7–6^{(8–6)}, 6–4
2	Halle, Germany	6 June 2005	Grass	(Germany) Florian Mayer	60	2R	6–2, 6–4
3	Halle, Germany	6 June 2005	Grass	(Germany) Philipp Kohlschreiber	71	QF	6–3, 6–4
4	Halle, Germany	6 June 2005	Grass	(Germany) Tommy Haas	23	SF	6–4, 7–6^{(11–9)}
5	Halle, Germany	6 June 2005	Grass	(Russia) Marat Safin	5	F	6–4, 6–7^{(6–8)}, 6–4
6	Wimbledon, United Kingdom	20 June 2005	Grass	(France) Paul-Henri Mathieu	58	1R	6–4, 6–2, 6–4
7	Wimbledon, United Kingdom	20 June 2005	Grass	(Czech Republic) Ivo Minář	99	2R	6–4, 6–4, 6–1
8	Wimbledon, United Kingdom	20 June 2005	Grass	(Germany) Nicolas Kiefer	26	3R	6–2, 6–7^{(5–7)}, 6–1, 7–5
9	Wimbledon, United Kingdom	20 June 2005	Grass	(Spain) Juan Carlos Ferrero	31	4R	6–3, 6–4, 7–6^{(8–6)}
10	Wimbledon, United Kingdom	20 June 2005	Grass	(Chile) Fernando González	24	QF	7–5, 6–2, 7–6^{(7–2)}
11	Wimbledon, United Kingdom	20 June 2005	Grass	(Australia) Lleyton Hewitt	2	SF	6–3, 6–4, 7–6^{(7–4)}
12	Wimbledon, United Kingdom	20 June 2005	Grass	(United States) Andy Roddick	4	F	6–2, 7–6^{(7–2)}, 6–4
13	Cincinnati, United States	15 August 2005	Hard	(United States) James Blake	70	1R	7–6^{(7–3)}, 7–5
14	Cincinnati, United States	15 August 2005	Hard	(Germany) Nicolas Kiefer (2)	38	2R	4–6, 6–4, 6–4
15	Cincinnati, United States	15 August 2005	Hard	(Belgium) Olivier Rochus	34	3R	6–3, 6–4
16	Cincinnati, United States	15 August 2005	Hard	(Argentina) José Acasuso	52	QF	6–4, 6–3
17	Cincinnati, United States	15 August 2005	Hard	(United States) Robby Ginepri	58	SF	4–6, 7–5, 6–4
18	Cincinnati, United States	15 August 2005	Hard	(United States) Andy Roddick (2)	5	F	6–3, 7–5
19	New York, United States	29 August 2005	Hard	(Czech Republic) Ivo Minář (2)	77	1R	6–1, 6–1, 6–1
20	New York, United States	29 August 2005	Hard	(France) Fabrice Santoro	76	2R	7–5, 7–5, 7–6^{(7–2)}
21	New York, United States	29 August 2005	Hard	(Belgium) Olivier Rochus (2)	29	3R	6–3, 7–6^{(8–6)}, 6–2
22	New York, United States	29 August 2005	Hard	(Germany) Nicolas Kiefer (3)	38	4R	6–4, 6–7^{(3–7)}, 6–3, 6–4
23	New York, United States	29 August 2005	Hard	(Argentina) David Nalbandian	11	QF	6–2, 6–4, 6–1
24	New York, United States	29 August 2005	Hard	(Australia) Lleyton Hewitt (2)	4	SF	6–3, 7–6^{(7–0)}, 4–6, 6–3
25	New York, United States	29 August 2005	Hard	(United States) Andre Agassi	7	F	6–3, 2–6, 7–6^{(7–1)}, 6–1
26	Geneva, Switzerland	23 September 2005	Clay (i)	(United Kingdom) Alan Mackin	262	RR	6–0, 6–0, 6–2
27	Bangkok, Thailand	26 September 2005	Hard (i)	(Brazil) Marcos Daniel	133	1R	7–6^{(7–4)}, 6–4
28	Bangkok, Thailand	26 September 2005	Hard (i)	(Germany) Denis Gremelmayr	239	2R	6–3, 6–2
29	Bangkok, Thailand	26 September 2005	Hard (i)	(Luxembourg) Gilles Müller	66	QF	6–4, 6–3
30	Bangkok, Thailand	26 September 2005	Hard (i)	(Finland) Jarkko Nieminen	42	SF	6–3, 6–4
31	Bangkok, Thailand	26 September 2005	Hard (i)	(United Kingdom) Andy Murray	109	F	6–3, 7–5
32	Shanghai, China	14 November 2005	Carpet (i)	(Argentina) David Nalbandian (2)	12	RR	6–3, 2–6, 6–4
33	Shanghai, China	14 November 2005	Carpet (i)	(Croatia) Ivan Ljubičić	8	RR	6–3, 2–6, 7–6^{(7–4)}
34	Shanghai, China	14 November 2005	Carpet (i)	(Argentina) Guillermo Coria	6	RR	6–0, 1–6, 6–2
35	Shanghai, China	14 November 2005	Carpet (i)	(Argentina) Gastón Gaudio	9	SF	6–0, 6–0
–	Shanghai, China	14 November 2005	Carpet (i)	(Argentina) David Nalbandian	12	F	7–6^{(7–4)}, 7–6^{(13–11)}, 2–6, 1–6, 6–7^{(3–7)}

=== 56-match hard court win streak 2005–2006 ===
This is the longest hard court streak of the Open Era.

No.	Tournament	Start date (tournament)	Surface	Opponent	Rank	Rd	Score
–	Melbourne, Australia	3 January 2005	Hard	(Russia) Marat Safin	4	SF	7–5, 4–6, 7–5, 6–7^{(6–8)}, 7–9
1	Rotterdam, Netherlands	14 February 2005	Hard (i)	(Czech Republic) Bohdan Ulihrach	112	1R	6–3, 6–4
2	Rotterdam, Netherlands	14 February 2005	Hard (i)	(Switzerland) Stan Wawrinka	128	2R	6–1, 6–4
3	Rotterdam, Netherlands	14 February 2005	Hard (i)	(Russia) Nikolay Davydenko	15	QF	7–5, 7–5
4	Rotterdam, Netherlands	14 February 2005	Hard (i)	(Croatia) Mario Ančić	31	SF	7–5, 6–3
5	Rotterdam, Netherlands	14 February 2005	Hard (i)	(Croatia) Ivan Ljubičić	19	F	5–7, 7–5, 7–6^{(7–5)}
6	Dubai, United Arab Emirates	21 February 2005	Hard	(Czech Republic) Ivo Minář	119	1R	6–7^{(5–7)}, 6–3, 7–6^{(7–5)}
7	Dubai, United Arab Emirates	21 February 2005	Hard	(Spain) Juan Carlos Ferrero	98	2R	4–6, 6–3, 7–6^{(8–6)}
8	Dubai, United Arab Emirates	21 February 2005	Hard	(Russia) Mikhail Youzhny	17	QF	6–3, 7–5
9	Dubai, United Arab Emirates	21 February 2005	Hard	(United States) Andre Agassi	10	SF	6–3, 6–1
10	Dubai, United Arab Emirates	21 February 2005	Hard	(Croatia) Ivan Ljubičić (2)	14	F	6–1, 6–7^{(6–8)}, 6–3
11	Indian Wells, United States	7 March 2005	Hard	(United States) Mardy Fish	49	2R	6–3, 6–3
12	Indian Wells, United States	7 March 2005	Hard	(Luxembourg) Gilles Müller	67	3R	6–3, 6–2
13	Indian Wells, United States	7 March 2005	Hard	(Croatia) Ivan Ljubičić (3)	13	4R	7–6^{(7–3)}, 7–6^{(7–4)}
14	Indian Wells, United States	7 March 2005	Hard	(Germany) Nicolas Kiefer	31	QF	6–4, 6–1
15	Indian Wells, United States	7 March 2005	Hard	(Argentina) Guillermo Cañas	14	SF	6–3, 6–1
16	Indian Wells, United States	7 March 2005	Hard	(Australia) Lleyton Hewitt	2	F	6–2, 6–4, 6–4
17	Miami, United States	21 March 2005	Hard	(Belgium) Olivier Rochus	40	2R	6–3, 6–1
18	Miami, United States	21 March 2005	Hard	(Argentina) Mariano Zabaleta	52	3R	6–2, 5–7, 6–3
19	Miami, United States	21 March 2005	Hard	(Croatia) Mario Ančić (2)	20	4R	6–3, 4–6, 6–4
20	Miami, United States	21 March 2005	Hard	(United Kingdom) Tim Henman	7	QF	6–4, 6–2
21	Miami, United States	21 March 2005	Hard	(United States) Andre Agassi (2)	10	SF	6–4, 6–3
22	Miami, United States	21 March 2005	Hard	(Spain) Rafael Nadal	31	F	2–6, 6–7^{(4–7)}, 7–6^{(7–5)}, 6–3, 6–1
23	Cincinnati, United States	15 August 2005	Hard	(United States) James Blake	70	1R	7–6^{(7–3)}, 7–5
24	Cincinnati, United States	15 August 2005	Hard	(Germany) Nicolas Kiefer (2)	38	2R	4–6, 6–4, 6–4
25	Cincinnati, United States	15 August 2005	Hard	(Belgium) Olivier Rochus (2)	34	3R	6–3, 6–4
26	Cincinnati, United States	15 August 2005	Hard	(Argentina) José Acasuso	52	QF	6–4, 6–3
27	Cincinnati, United States	15 August 2005	Hard	(United States) Robby Ginepri	58	SF	4–6, 7–5, 6–4
28	Cincinnati, United States	15 August 2005	Hard	(United States) Andy Roddick	5	F	6–3, 7–5
29	New York, United States	29 August 2005	Hard	(Czech Republic) Ivo Minář (2)	77	1R	6–1, 6–1, 6–1
30	New York, United States	29 August 2005	Hard	(France) Fabrice Santoro	76	2R	7–5, 7–5, 7–6^{(7–2)}
31	New York, United States	29 August 2005	Hard	(Belgium) Olivier Rochus (3)	29	3R	6–3, 7–6^{(8–6)}, 6–2
32	New York, United States	29 August 2005	Hard	(Germany) Nicolas Kiefer (3)	38	4R	6–4, 6–7^{(3–7)}, 6–3, 6–4
33	New York, United States	29 August 2005	Hard	(Argentina) David Nalbandian	11	QF	6–2, 6–4, 6–1
34	New York, United States	29 August 2005	Hard	(Australia) Lleyton Hewitt (2)	4	SF	6–3, 7–6^{(7–0)}, 4–6, 6–3
35	New York, United States	29 August 2005	Hard	(United States) Andre Agassi (3)	7	F	6–3, 2–6, 7–6^{(7–1)}, 6–1
36	Bangkok, Thailand	26 September 2005	Hard (i)	(Brazil) Marcos Daniel	133	1R	7–6^{(7–4)}, 6–4
37	Bangkok, Thailand	26 September 2005	Hard (i)	(Germany) Denis Gremelmayr	239	2R	6–3, 6–2
38	Bangkok, Thailand	26 September 2005	Hard (i)	(Luxembourg) Gilles Müller (2)	66	QF	6–4, 6–3
39	Bangkok, Thailand	26 September 2005	Hard (i)	(Finland) Jarkko Nieminen	42	SF	6–3, 6–4
40	Bangkok, Thailand	26 September 2005	Hard (i)	(United Kingdom) Andy Murray	109	F	6–3, 7–5
41	Doha, Qatar	2 January 2006	Hard	(Czech Republic) Ivo Minář (3)	73	1R	6–1, 6–3
42	Doha, Qatar	2 January 2006	Hard	(France) Fabrice Santoro (2)	58	2R	7–6^{(7–2)}, 7–6^{(7–5)}
43	Doha, Qatar	2 January 2006	Hard	(Cyprus) Marcos Baghdatis	55	QF	6–4, 6–3
44	Doha, Qatar	2 January 2006	Hard	(Germany) Tommy Haas	45	SF	6–3, 6–3
45	Doha, Qatar	2 January 2006	Hard	(France) Gaël Monfils	55	F	6–3, 7–6^{(7–5)}
46	Melbourne, Australia	16 January 2006	Hard	(Uzbekistan) Denis Istomin	195	1R	6–2, 6–3, 6–2
47	Melbourne, Australia	16 January 2006	Hard	(Germany) Florian Mayer	69	2R	6–1, 6–4, 6–0
48	Melbourne, Australia	16 January 2006	Hard	(Belarus) Max Mirnyi	34	3R	6–3, 6–4, 6–3
49	Melbourne, Australia	16 January 2006	Hard	(Germany) Tommy Haas (2)	41	4R	6–4, 6–0, 3–6, 4–6, 6–2
50	Melbourne, Australia	16 January 2006	Hard	(Russia) Nikolay Davydenko (2)	5	QF	6–4, 3–6, 7–6^{(9–7)}, 7–6^{(7–5)}
51	Melbourne, Australia	16 January 2006	Hard	(Germany) Nicolas Kiefer (4)	25	SF	6–3, 5–7, 6–0, 6–2
52	Melbourne, Australia	16 January 2006	Hard	(Cyprus) Marcos Baghdatis (2)	54	F	5–7, 7–5, 6–0, 6–2
53	Dubai, United Arab Emirates	27 February 2006	Hard	(Switzerland) Stan Wawrinka (2)	57	1R	7–6^{(7–3)}, 6–3
54	Dubai, United Arab Emirates	27 February 2006	Hard	(Kuwait) Mohammad Ghareeb	488	2R	7–6^{(7–5)}, 6–4
55	Dubai, United Arab Emirates	27 February 2006	Hard	(Czech Republic) Robin Vik	75	QF	6–3, 6–2
56	Dubai, United Arab Emirates	27 February 2006	Hard	(Russia) Mikhail Youzhny (2)	52	SF	6–2, 6–3
–	Dubai, United Arab Emirates	27 February 2006	Hard	(Spain) Rafael Nadal	2	F	6–2, 4–6, 4–6

=== 65-match grass court win streak 2003–2008 ===
This is the longest grass streak of the Open Era.

No.	Tournament	Start date (tournament)	Surface	Opponent	Rank	Rd	Score
–	Wimbledon, United Kingdom	24 June 2002	Grass	(Croatia) Mario Ančić	154	1R	3–6, 6–7^{(2–7)}, 3–6
1	Halle, Germany	9 June 2003	Grass	(Armenia) Sargis Sargsian	61	1R	7–5, 6–1
2	Halle, Germany	9 June 2003	Grass	(Spain) Fernando Vicente	62	2R	4–6, 6–2, 6–1
3	Halle, Germany	9 June 2003	Grass	(Morocco) Younes El Aynaoui	24	QF	7–5, 7–6^{(7–3)}
4	Halle, Germany	9 June 2003	Grass	(Russia) Mikhail Youzhny	29	SF	4–6, 7–6^{(7–4)}, 6–2
5	Halle, Germany	9 June 2003	Grass	(Germany) Nicolas Kiefer	73	F	6–1, 6–3
6	Wimbledon, United Kingdom	23 June 2003	Grass	(South Korea) Hyung–Taik Lee	55	1R	6–3, 6–3, 7–6^{(7–2)}
7	Wimbledon, United Kingdom	23 June 2003	Grass	(Austria) Stefan Koubek	70	2R	7–5, 6–1, 6–1
8	Wimbledon, United Kingdom	23 June 2003	Grass	(United States) Mardy Fish	45	3R	6–3, 6–1, 4–6, 6–1
9	Wimbledon, United Kingdom	23 June 2003	Grass	(Spain) Feliciano López	52	4R	7–6^{(7–5)}, 6–4, 6–4
10	Wimbledon, United Kingdom	23 June 2003	Grass	(Netherlands) Sjeng Schalken	12	QF	6–3, 6–4, 6–4
11	Wimbledon, United Kingdom	23 June 2003	Grass	(United States) Andy Roddick	6	SF	7–6^{(8–6)}, 6–3, 6–3
12	Wimbledon, United Kingdom	23 June 2003	Grass	(Australia) Mark Philippoussis	48	F	7–6^{(7–5)}, 6–2, 7–6^{(7–3)}
13	Halle, Germany	7 June 2004	Grass	(Sweden) Thomas Johansson	191	1R	6–3, 6–2
14	Halle, Germany	7 June 2004	Grass	(Russia) Mikhail Youzhny (2)	34	2R	6–2, 6–1
15	Halle, Germany	7 June 2004	Grass	(France) Arnaud Clément	37	QF	6–3, 7–5
16	Halle, Germany	7 June 2004	Grass	(Czech Republic) Jiří Novák	19	SF	6–3, 6–4
17	Halle, Germany	7 June 2004	Grass	(United States) Mardy Fish (2)	23	F	6–0, 6–3
18	Wimbledon, United Kingdom	21 June 2004	Grass	(United Kingdom) Alex Bogdanovic	295	1R	6–3, 6–3, 6–0
19	Wimbledon, United Kingdom	21 June 2004	Grass	(Colombia) Alejandro Falla	138	2R	6–1, 6–2, 6–0
20	Wimbledon, United Kingdom	21 June 2004	Grass	(Sweden) Thomas Johansson (2)	123	3R	6–3, 6–4, 6–3
21	Wimbledon, United Kingdom	21 June 2004	Grass	(Croatia) Ivo Karlović	62	4R	6–3, 7–6^{(7–3)}, 7–6^{(7–5)}
22	Wimbledon, United Kingdom	21 June 2004	Grass	(Australia) Lleyton Hewitt	10	QF	6–1, 6–7^{(1–7)}, 6–0, 6–4
23	Wimbledon, United Kingdom	21 June 2004	Grass	(France) Sébastien Grosjean	13	SF	6–2, 6–3, 7–6^{(8–6)}
24	Wimbledon, United Kingdom	21 June 2004	Grass	(United States) Andy Roddick (2)	2	F	4–6, 7–5, 7–6^{(7–3)}, 6–4
25	Halle, Germany	6 June 2005	Grass	(Sweden) Robin Söderling	35	1R	6–7^{(5–7)}, 7–6^{(8–6)}, 6–4
26	Halle, Germany	6 June 2005	Grass	(Germany) Florian Mayer	60	2R	6–2, 6–4
27	Halle, Germany	6 June 2005	Grass	(Germany) Philipp Kohlschreiber	71	QF	6–3, 6–4
28	Halle, Germany	6 June 2005	Grass	(Germany) Tommy Haas	23	SF	6–4, 7–6^{(11–9)}
29	Halle, Germany	6 June 2005	Grass	(Russia) Marat Safin	5	F	6–4, 6–7^{(6–8)}, 6–4
30	Wimbledon, United Kingdom	20 June 2005	Grass	(France) Paul-Henri Mathieu	58	1R	6–4, 6–2, 6–4
31	Wimbledon, United Kingdom	20 June 2005	Grass	(Czech Republic) Ivo Minář	99	2R	6–4, 6–4, 6–1
32	Wimbledon, United Kingdom	20 June 2005	Grass	(Germany) Nicolas Kiefer (2)	26	3R	6–2, 6–7^{(5–7)}, 6–1, 7–5
33	Wimbledon, United Kingdom	20 June 2005	Grass	(Spain) Juan Carlos Ferrero	31	4R	6–3, 6–4, 7–6^{(8–6)}
34	Wimbledon, United Kingdom	20 June 2005	Grass	(Chile) Fernando González	24	QF	7–5, 6–2, 7–6^{(7–2)}
35	Wimbledon, United Kingdom	20 June 2005	Grass	(Australia) Lleyton Hewitt (2)	2	SF	6–3, 6–4, 7–6^{(7–4)}
36	Wimbledon, United Kingdom	20 June 2005	Grass	(United States) Andy Roddick (3)	4	F	6–2, 7–6^{(7–2)}, 6–4
37	Halle, Germany	12 June 2006	Grass	(India) Rohan Bopanna	267	1R	7–6^{(7–4)}, 6–2
38	Halle, Germany	12 June 2006	Grass	(France) Richard Gasquet	51	2R	7–6^{(9–7)}, 6–7^{(7–9)}, 6–4
39	Halle, Germany	12 June 2006	Grass	(Belgium) Olivier Rochus	29	QF	6–7^{(2–7)}, 7–6^{(11–9)}, 7–6^{(7–5)}
40	Halle, Germany	12 June 2006	Grass	(Germany) Tommy Haas (2)	26	SF	6–4, 6–7^{(4–7)}, 6–3
41	Halle, Germany	12 June 2006	Grass	(Czech Republic) Tomáš Berdych	15	F	6–0, 6–7^{(4–7)}, 6–2
42	Wimbledon, United Kingdom	26 June 2006	Grass	(France) Richard Gasquet (2)	50	1R	6–3, 6–2, 6–2
43	Wimbledon, United Kingdom	26 June 2006	Grass	(United Kingdom) Tim Henman	64	2R	6–4, 6–0, 6–2
44	Wimbledon, United Kingdom	26 June 2006	Grass	(France) Nicolas Mahut	77	3R	6–3, 7–6^{(7–2)}, 6–4
45	Wimbledon, United Kingdom	26 June 2006	Grass	(Czech Republic) Tomáš Berdych (2)	14	4R	6–3, 6–3, 6–4
46	Wimbledon, United Kingdom	26 June 2006	Grass	(Croatia) Mario Ančić	10	QF	6–4, 6–4, 6–4
47	Wimbledon, United Kingdom	26 June 2006	Grass	(Sweden) Jonas Björkman	69	SF	6–2, 6–0, 6–2
48	Wimbledon, United Kingdom	26 June 2006	Grass	(Spain) Rafael Nadal	2	F	6–0, 7–6^{(7–5)}, 6–7^{(2–7)}, 6–3
49	Wimbledon, United Kingdom	25 June 2007	Grass	(Russia) Teymuraz Gabashvili	86	1R	6–3, 6–2, 6–4
50	Wimbledon, United Kingdom	25 June 2007	Grass	(Argentina) Juan Martín del Potro	56	2R	6–2, 7–5, 6–1
51	Wimbledon, United Kingdom	25 June 2007	Grass	(Russia) Marat Safin (2)	24	3R	6–1, 6–4, 7–6^{(7–4)}
52	Wimbledon, United Kingdom	25 June 2007	Grass	(Spain) Juan Carlos Ferrero (2)	18	QF	7–6^{(7–2)}, 3–6, 6–1, 6–3
53	Wimbledon, United Kingdom	25 June 2007	Grass	(France) Richard Gasquet (3)	14	SF	7–5, 6–3, 6–4
54	Wimbledon, United Kingdom	25 June 2007	Grass	(Spain) Rafael Nadal (2)	2	F	7–6^{(9–7)}, 4–6, 7–6^{(7–3)}, 2–6, 6–2
55	Halle, Germany	9 June 2008	Grass	(Germany) Michael Berrer	83	1R	6–4, 6–2
56	Halle, Germany	9 June 2008	Grass	(Czech Republic) Jan Vacek	342	2R	7–5, 6–3
57	Halle, Germany	9 June 2008	Grass	(Cyprus) Marcos Baghdatis	23	QF	6–4, 6–4
58	Halle, Germany	9 June 2008	Grass	(Germany) Nicolas Kiefer (3)	38	SF	6–1, 6–4
59	Halle, Germany	9 June 2008	Grass	(Germany) Philipp Kohlschreiber	40	F	6–3, 6–4
60	Wimbledon, United Kingdom	23 June 2008	Grass	(Slovakia) Dominik Hrbatý	273	1R	6–3, 6–2, 6–2
61	Wimbledon, United Kingdom	23 June 2008	Grass	(Sweden) Robin Söderling (2)	41	2R	6–3, 6–4, 7–6^{(7–3)}
62	Wimbledon, United Kingdom	23 June 2008	Grass	(France) Marc Gicquel	53	3R	6–3, 6–3, 6–1
63	Wimbledon, United Kingdom	23 June 2008	Grass	(Australia) Lleyton Hewitt (3)	27	4R	7–6^{(9–7)}, 6–2, 6–4
64	Wimbledon, United Kingdom	23 June 2008	Grass	(Croatia) Mario Ančić (2)	43	QF	6–1, 7–5, 6–4
65	Wimbledon, United Kingdom	23 June 2008	Grass	(Russia) Marat Safin (3)	75	SF	6–3, 7–6^{(7–3)}, 6–4
–	Wimbledon, United Kingdom	23 June 2008	Grass	(Spain) Rafael Nadal	2	F	4–6, 4–6, 7–6^{(7–5)}, 7–6^{(10–8)}, 7–9

=== 49-match win streak in the United States 2004–2006 ===
This is the longest streak on American soil of the Open Era.

No.	Tournament	Start date (tournament)	Surface	Opponent	Rank	Rd	Score
–	Cincinnati, United States	2 August 2004	Hard	(Slovakia) Dominik Hrbatý	21	1R	6–1, 6–7^{(7–9)}, 4–6
1	US Open, United States	30 August 2004	Hard	(Spain) Albert Costa	44	1R	7–5, 6–2, 6–4
2	US Open, United States	30 August 2004	Hard	(Cyprus) Marcos Baghdatis	240	2R	6–2, 6–7^{(4–7)}, 6–3, 6–1
3	US Open, United States	30 August 2004	Hard	(France) Fabrice Santoro	34	3R	6–0, 6–4, 7–6^{(9–7)}
4	US Open, United States	30 August 2004	Hard	(United States) Andre Agassi	7	QF	6–3, 2–6, 7–5, 3–6, 6–3
5	US Open, United States	30 August 2004	Hard	(United Kingdom) Tim Henman	6	SF	6–3, 6–4, 6–4
6	US Open, United States	30 August 2004	Hard	(Australia) Lleyton Hewitt	5	F	6–0, 7–6^{(7–3)}, 6–0
7	Houston, United States	15 November 2004	Hard	(Argentina) Gastón Gaudio	10	RR	6–1, 7–6^{(7–4)}
8	Houston, United States	15 November 2004	Hard	(Australia) Lleyton Hewitt (2)	3	RR	6–3, 6–4
9	Houston, United States	15 November 2004	Hard	(Spain) Carlos Moyá	5	RR	6–3, 3–6, 6–3
10	Houston, United States	15 November 2004	Hard	(Russia) Marat Safin	4	SF	6–3, 7–6^{(20–18)}
11	Houston, United States	15 November 2004	Hard	(Australia) Lleyton Hewitt (3)	3	F	6–3, 6–2
12	Indian Wells, United States	7 March 2005	Hard	(United States) Mardy Fish	49	2R	6–3, 6–3
13	Indian Wells, United States	7 March 2005	Hard	(Luxembourg) Gilles Müller	67	3R	6–3, 6–2
14	Indian Wells, United States	7 March 2005	Hard	(Croatia) Ivan Ljubičić	13	4R	7–6^{(7–3)}, 7–6^{(7–4)}
15	Indian Wells, United States	7 March 2005	Hard	(Germany) Nicolas Kiefer	31	QF	6–4, 6–1
16	Indian Wells, United States	7 March 2005	Hard	(Argentina) Guillermo Cañas	14	SF	6–3, 6–1
17	Indian Wells, United States	7 March 2005	Hard	(Australia) Lleyton Hewitt (4)	2	F	6–2, 6–4, 6–4
18	Miami, United States	21 March 2005	Hard	(Belgium) Olivier Rochus	40	2R	6–3, 6–1
19	Miami, United States	21 March 2005	Hard	(Argentina) Mariano Zabaleta	52	3R	6–2, 5–7, 6–3
20	Miami, United States	21 March 2005	Hard	(Croatia) Mario Ančić	20	4R	6–3, 4–6, 6–4
21	Miami, United States	21 March 2005	Hard	(United Kingdom) Tim Henman (2)	7	QF	6–4, 6–2
22	Miami, United States	21 March 2005	Hard	(United States) Andre Agassi (2)	10	SF	6–4, 6–3
23	Miami, United States	21 March 2005	Hard	(Spain) Rafael Nadal	31	F	2–6, 6–7^{(4–7)}, 7–6^{(7–5)}, 6–3, 6–1
24	Cincinnati, United States	15 August 2005	Hard	(United States) James Blake	70	1R	7–6^{(7–5)}, 7–5
25	Cincinnati, United States	15 August 2005	Hard	(Germany) Nicolas Kiefer (2)	38	2R	4–6, 6–4, 6–4
26	Cincinnati, United States	15 August 2005	Hard	(Belgium) Olivier Rochus (2)	34	3R	6–3, 6–4
27	Cincinnati, United States	15 August 2005	Hard	(Argentina) José Acasuso	52	QF	6–4, 6–3
28	Cincinnati, United States	15 August 2005	Hard	(United States) Robby Ginepri	58	SF	4–6, 7–5, 6–4
29	Cincinnati, United States	15 August 2005	Hard	(United States) Andy Roddick	5	F	6–3, 7–5
30	US Open, United States	29 August 2005	Hard	(Czech Republic) Ivo Minář	77	1R	6–1, 6–1, 6–1
31	US Open, United States	29 August 2005	Hard	(France) Fabrice Santoro (2)	76	2R	7–5, 7–5, 7–6^{(7–2)}
32	US Open, United States	29 August 2005	Hard	(Belgium) Olivier Rochus (3)	29	3R	6–3, 7–6^{(8–6)}, 6–2
33	US Open, United States	29 August 2005	Hard	(Germany) Nicolas Kiefer (3)	29	4R	6–4, 6–7^{(3–7)}, 6–3, 6–4
34	US Open, United States	29 August 2005	Hard	(Argentina) David Nalbandian	11	QF	6–2, 6–4, 6–1
35	US Open, United States	29 August 2005	Hard	(Australia) Lleyton Hewitt (5)	4	SF	6–3, 7–6^{(7–0)}, 4–6, 6–3
36	US Open, United States	29 August 2005	Hard	(United States) Andre Agassi (3)	7	F	6–3, 2–6, 7–6^{(7–1)}, 6–1
37	Indian Wells, United States	6 March 2006	Hard	(Chile) Nicolás Massú	47	2R	6–3, 7–6^{(7–4)}
38	Indian Wells, United States	6 March 2006	Hard	(Belgium) Olivier Rochus (4)	32	3R	3–6, 6–2, 7–5
39	Indian Wells, United States	6 March 2006	Hard	(France) Richard Gasquet	18	4R	6–3, 6–4
40	Indian Wells, United States	6 March 2006	Hard	(Croatia) Ivan Ljubičić (2)	6	QF	6–2, 6–3
41	Indian Wells, United States	6 March 2006	Hard	(Thailand) Paradorn Srichaphan	61	SF	6–2, 6–3
42	Indian Wells, United States	6 March 2006	Hard	(United States) James Blake (2)	14	F	7–5, 6–3, 6–0
43	Miami, United States	20 March 2006	Hard	(France) Arnaud Clément	53	2R	6–2, 6–7^{(4–7)}, 6–0
44	Miami, United States	20 March 2006	Hard	(Germany) Tommy Haas	28	3R	6–1, 6–3
45	Miami, United States	20 March 2006	Hard	(Russia) Dmitry Tursunov	36	4R	6–3, 6–3
46	Miami, United States	20 March 2006	Hard	(United States) James Blake (3)	9	QF	7–6^{(7–2)}, 6–4
47	Miami, United States	20 March 2006	Hard	(Spain) David Ferrer	11	SF	6–1, 6–4
48	Miami, United States	20 March 2006	Hard	(Croatia) Ivan Ljubičić (3)	6	F	7–6^{(7–5)}, 7–6^{(7–4)}, 7–6^{(8–6)}
49	Cincinnati, United States	14 August 2006	Hard	(Thailand) Paradorn Srichaphan (2)	45	1R	7–5, 6–4
–	Cincinnati, United States	14 August 2006	Hard	(United Kingdom) Andy Murray	21	2R	5–7, 4–6

== ATP Tour career earnings ==
Year	Majors	ATP wins	Total wins	Earnings ($)	Money list rank
1998	0	0	0	$27,305	–
1999	0	0	0	$225,139	97
2000	0	0	0	$623,782	27
2001	0	1	1	$865,425	14
2002	0	3	3	$1,995,027	4
2003	1	6	7	$4,000,680	1
2004	3	8	11	$6,357,547	1
2005	2	9	11	$6,137,018	1
2006	3	9	12	$8,343,885	1
2007	3	5	8	$10,130,620	1
2008	1	3	4	$5,886,879	2
2009	2	2	4	$8,768,110	1
2010	1	4	5	$7,698,289	2
2011	0	4	4	$6,369,576	3
2012	1	5	6	$8,584,842	2
2013	0	1	1	$3,203,637	6
2014	0	5	5	$9,343,988	2
2015	0	6	6	$8,682,892	2
2016	0	0	0	$1,527,269	22
2017	2	5	7	$13,054,856	2
2018	1	3	4	$8,629,233	4
2019	0	4	4	$8,716,975	3
2020	0	0	0	$714,792	36
2021	0	0	0	$647,655	78
Career	20	83	103	$130,594,339	3

== Career milestone wins ==
=== Centennial match wins ===
#	Date	Age	Player	Event	Surface	Rd	Score
1.	September 1998	17 years, 1 month	(France) Guillaume Raoux	Open de Toulouse, France	Hard (i)	1R	6–2, 6–2
100.	October 2001	20 years, 2 months	(France) Julien Boutter	Swiss Indoors, Switzerland	Carpet (i)	SF	7–6^{(7–3)}, 6–4
200.	June 2003	21 years, 10 months	(Russia) Mikhail Youzhny	**Halle Open**, Germany	Grass	SF	4–6, 7–6^{(7–4)}, 6–2
300.	September 2004	23 years, 1 month	(Australia) Lleyton Hewitt	**US Open**, United States	Hard	F	6–0, 7–6^{(7–3)}, 6–0
400.	January 2006	24 years, 5 months	(Germany) Tommy Haas	**Australian Open**, Australia	Hard	4R	6–4, 6–0, 3–6, 4–6, 6–2
500.	April 2007	25 years, 8 months	(Spain) David Ferrer	Monte-Carlo Masters, France	Clay	QF	6–4, 6–0
600.	August 2008	27 years	(Brazil) Thiago Alves	**US Open**, United States	Hard	2R	6–3, 7–5, 6–4
700.	May 2010	28 years, 9 months	(Germany) Julian Reister	French Open, France	Clay	3R	6–4, 6–0, 6–4
800.	November 2011	30 years, 3 months	(Argentina) Juan Mónaco	**Paris Masters**, France	Hard (i)	QF	6–3, 7–5
900.	May 2013	31 years, 9 months	(France) Gilles Simon	French Open, France	Clay	4R	6–1, 4–6, 2–6, 6–2, 6–3
1000.	January 2015	33 years, 5 months	(Canada) Milos Raonic	**Brisbane International**, Australia	Hard	F	6–4, 6–7^{(2–7)}, 6–4
1100.	June 2017	35 years, 10 months	(Japan) Yūichi Sugita	**Halle Open**, Germany	Grass	1R	6–3, 6–1
1200.	March 2019	37 years, 7 months	(South Africa) Kevin Anderson	**Miami Open**, United States	Hard	QF	6–0, 6–4

- Bold indicates that he went on to win the tournament.

=== Milestone Grand Slam match wins ===
#	Date	Age	Player	Event	Surface	Rd	Score
1.	January 2000	18 years, 5 months	(United States) Michael Chang	Australian Open, Australia	Hard	1R	6–4, 6–4, 7–6^{(7–5)}
100.	June 2006	24 years, 10 months	(United Kingdom) Tim Henman	**Wimbledon**, United Kingdom	Grass	2R	6–3, 6–4, 7–5
200.	June 2010	28 years, 10 months	(Colombia) Alejandro Falla	Wimbledon, United Kingdom	Grass	1R	5–7, 4–6, 6–4, 7–6^{(7–1)}, 6–0
300.	January 2016	34 years, 5 months	(Bulgaria) Grigor Dimitrov	Australian Open, Australia	Hard	3R	6–4, 3–6, 6–1, 6–4

- Bold indicates that he went on to win the tournament.

=== Milestone hard court match wins ===
#	Date	Age	Player	Event	Surface	Rd	Score
1.	September 1998	17 years, 1 month	(France) Guillaume Raoux	Open de Toulouse, France	Hard (i)	1R	6–2, 6–2
100.	February 2003	21 years, 6 months	(Morocco) Hicham Arazi	**Dubai Tennis Championships**, United Arab Emirates	Hard	QF	7–5, 6–3
200.	March 2005	23 years, 7 months	(Germany) Nicolas Kiefer	**Indian Wells Open**, United States	Hard	QF	6–4, 6–1
300.	August 2007	26 years	(Croatia) Ivo Karlović	Canadian Open, Canada	Hard	2R	7–6^{(7–3)}, 7–6^{(7–2)}
400.	January 2010	28 years, 5 months	(Belgium) Christophe Rochus	Qatar Open, Qatar	Hard	1R	6–1, 6–2
500.	February 2012	30 years, 6 months	(France) Nicolas Mahut	**Rotterdam Open**, Netherlands	Hard (i)	1R	6–4, 6–4
600.	September 2014	33 years, 1 month	(Italy) Simone Bolelli	**Davis Cup Semifinals**, Switzerland	Hard (i)	RR	7–6^{(7–5)}, 6–4, 6–4
700.	October 2017	36 years, 2 months	(France) Benoît Paire	**Swiss Indoors**, Switzerland	Hard (i)	2R	6–1, 6–3

- Bold indicates that he went on to win the tournament.

=== Milestone grass court match wins ===
#	Date	Age	Player	Event	Surface	Rd	Score
1.	June 2000	18 years, 10 months	(France) Arnaud Clément	Halle Open, Germany	Grass	1R	6–4, 6–2
50.	June 2005	23 years, 10 months	(Chile) Fernando González	**Wimbledon**, United Kingdom	Grass	QF	7–5, 6–2, 7–6^{(7–2)}
100.	June 2011	29 years, 10 months	(Russia) Mikhail Youzhny	Wimbledon, United Kingdom	Grass	4R	6–7^{(7–4)}, 6–3, 6–3, 6–3
150.	July 2016	34 years, 11 months	(United Kingdom) Daniel Evans	Wimbledon, United Kingdom	Grass	3R	6–4, 6–2, 6–2

- Bold indicates that he went on to win the tournament.

== ITF Junior Circuit ==
=== Singles: 2 (1 title, 1 runner-up) ===
Result	Year	Tournament	Surface	Opponent	Score
Win	1998	Wimbledon	Grass	(Georgia (country)) Irakli Labadze	6–4, 6–4
Loss	1998	US Open	Hard	(Argentina) David Nalbandian	3–6, 5–7

=== Doubles: 1 (1 title) ===
Result	Year	Tournament	Surface	Partner	Opponents	Score
Win	1998	Wimbledon	Grass	(Belgium) Olivier Rochus	(France) Michaël Llodra (Israel) Andy Ram	6–4, 6–4

=== Singles: 6 (5 titles, 1 runner-up) ===
Legend
Category GA (2–1)
Category G1 (0–0)
Category G2 (3–0)

Result	W–L	Date	Tournament	Tier	Surface	Opponent	Score
Win	1–0	May 1997	Prato International Junior Tournament, Italy	Category G2	Clay	(Croatia) Luka Kutanjac	6–4, 6–0
Win	2–0	Jan 1998	Victoria Junior Championship, Australia	Category G2	Hard	(France) Julien Jeanpierre	6–4, 6–4
Win	3–0	Apr 1998	City of Florence International Tournament, Italy	Category G2	Clay	(Italy) Filippo Volandri	7–6, 6–3
Win	4–0	Jul 1998	Wimbledon, United Kingdom	Category GA	Grass	(Georgia (country)) Irakli Labadze	6–4, 6–4
Loss	4–1	Sep 1998	US Open, United States	Category GA	Hard	(Argentina) David Nalbandian	3–6, 5–7
Win	5–1	Dec 1998	Orange Bowl, United States	Category GA	Hard	(Argentina) Guillermo Coria	7–5, 6–3

=== Doubles: 4 (2 titles, 2 runner-ups) ===
Legend
Category GA (1–0)
Category G1 (1–0)
Category G2 (0–2)

Result	W–L	Date	Tournament	Tier	Surface	Partner	Opponents	Score
Loss	0–1	May 1997	Prato International Junior Tournament, Italy	Category G2	Clay	(Japan) Jun Kato	(Belarus) Maxim Belski (Czech Republic) Tomáš Hájek	2–6, 2–6
Loss	0–2	Apr 1998	City of Florence International Tournament, Italy	Category G2	Clay	(Japan) Jun Kato	(Italy) Filippo Volandri (Italy) Uros Vico	3–6, 1–6
Win	1–2	Jun 1998	LTA International Junior Championships, UK	Category G1	Grass	(Belgium) Olivier Rochus	(France) Michaël Llodra (Israel) Andy Ram	3–6, 6–4, 7–5
Win	2–2	Jul 1998	Wimbledon, United Kingdom	Category GA	Grass	(Belgium) Olivier Rochus	(France) Michaël Llodra (Israel) Andy Ram	6–4, 6–4

=== Olympic Games (1 gold, 1 silver) ===
==== (20 wins – 7 losses) ====
Matches by tournament 2000 Sydney Olympics (4–2) 2004 Athens Olympics (2–2) 2008 Beijing Olympics (8–1) 2012 London Olympics (6–2)	Olympic medals: 2 Gold medals: 1 Silver medals: 1	Matches by medal finals Gold medal final (1–1) Bronze medal final (0–1)	Matches by type Singles (13–5) Doubles (7–2)	Matches by surface Hard (14–5) Grass (6–2)	Matches by setting Outdoors (20–7)

==== Singles (13–5) ====
Result	No.	Year	Opponent	Surface	Rd	Score
Win	1	2000	(Germany) David Prinosil	Hard	1R	6–2, 6–2
Win	2	2000	(Slovakia) Karol Kučera	Hard	2R	6–4, 6–3
Win	3	2000	(Sweden) Mikael Tillström	Hard	3R	6–1, 6–2
Win	4	2000	(Morocco) Karim Alami	Hard	QF	7–6^{(7–2)}, 6–1
Loss	1	2000	(Germany) Tommy Haas	Hard	SF	3–6, 2–6
Loss	2	2000	(France) Arnaud Di Pasquale	Hard	4th	6–7^{(5–7)}, 7–6^{(9–7)}, 3–6
Win	5	2004	(Russia) Nikolay Davydenko	Hard	1R	6–3, 5–7, 6–1
Loss	3	2004	(Czech Republic) Tomáš Berdych	Hard	2R	6–4, 5–7, 5–7
Win	6	2008	(Russia) Dmitry Tursunov	Hard	1R	6–4, 6–2
Win	7	2008	(El Salvador) Rafael Arévalo	Hard	2R	6–2, 6–4
Win	8	2008	(Czech Republic) Tomáš Berdych	Hard	3R	6–3, 7–6^{(7–4)}
Loss	4	2008	(United States) James Blake	Hard	QF	4–6, 6–7^{(2–7)}
Win	9	2012	(Colombia) Alejandro Falla	Grass	1R	6–3, 5–7, 6–3
Win	10	2012	(France) Julien Benneteau	Grass	2R	6–2, 6–2
Win	11	2012	(Uzbekistan) Denis Istomin	Grass	3R	7–5, 6–3
Win	12	2012	(United States) John Isner	Grass	QF	6–4, 7–6^{(7–5)}
Win	13	2012	(Argentina) Juan Martín del Potro	Grass	SF	3–6, 7–6^{(7–5)}, 19–17
Loss	5	2012	(United Kingdom) Andy Murray	Grass	S	2–6, 1–6, 4–6

==== Doubles (7–2) ====
Result	No.	Year	Partner	Country	Opponent	Surface	Rd	Score
Win	1	2004	Yves Allegro	(Poland) POL	Mariusz Fyrstenberg; Marcin Matkowski	Hard	1R	6–3, 6–2
Loss	1	2004	Yves Allegro	(India) IND	Mahesh Bhupathi; Leander Paes	Hard	2R	2–6, 6–7^{(7–9)}
Win	2	2008	Stan Wawrinka	(Italy) ITA	Simone Bolelli; Andreas Seppi	Hard	1R	7–5, 6–1
Win	3	2008	Stan Wawrinka	(Russia) RUS	Dmitry Tursunov; Mikhail Youzhny	Hard	2R	6–4, 6–3
Win	4	2008	Stan Wawrinka	(India) IND	Mahesh Bhupathi; Leander Paes	Hard	QF	6–2, 6–4
Win	5	2008	Stan Wawrinka	(United States) USA	Bob Bryan; Mike Bryan	Hard	SF	7–6^{(8–6)}, 6–4
Win	6	2008	Stan Wawrinka	(Sweden) SWE	Simon Aspelin; Thomas Johansson	Hard	G	6–3, 6–4, 6–7^{(4–7)}, 6–3
Win	7	2012	Stan Wawrinka	(Japan) JPN	Kei Nishikori; Go Soeda	Grass	1R	6–7^{(5–7)}, 6–4, 6–4
Loss	2	2012	Stan Wawrinka	(Israel) ISR	Jonathan Erlich; Andy Ram	Grass	2R	6–1, 6–7^{(5–7)}, 3–6

===== Wins: 1 =====
Edition	(Switzerland) Swiss Team	Rounds/Opponents
2008 Olympic Games	Roger Federer; Stan Wawrinka	1R: SUI 2–0 ITA; 2R: SUI 2–0 RUS; QF: SUI 2–0 IND; SF: SUI 2–0 USA; F-G: SUI 3–1 SWE

=== Davis Cup: 1 (1 title) ===
==== (52 wins – 18 losses) ====
Group membership World Group (28–14) WG play-off (22–4) Group I (2–0)	Matches by surface Hard (23–5) Clay (16–7) Grass (2–1) Carpet (11–5)	Matches by type Singles (40–8) Doubles (12–10)	Matches by setting Indoors (40–12) Outdoors (12–6)	Matches by venue Switzerland (27–8) Away (25–10)	Legend Ties (19–8) Rubbers (52–18)

- ▲ ▼ indicates the result of the Davis Cup match followed by the score, date, place of event, the zonal classification and its phase, and the court surface.

Result	No.	Rubber	Match type (partner if any)	Opponent nation	Opponent player(s)	Score
▲3–2; 2–4 April 1999; Patinoires du Littoral, Neuchâtel, Switzerland; World Group first round; carpet(i) surface
Win	1	II	Singles	Italy	Davide Sanguinetti	6–4, 6–7^{(3–7)}, 6–3, 6–4
Loss	2	V	Singles (dead rubber)	Italy	Gianluca Pozzi	4–6, 6–7^{(4–7)}
▼2–3; 16–18 July 1999; Primrose T.C., Brussels, Belgium; World Group quarterfinal; clay surface
Loss	3	II	Singles	Belgium	Christophe van Garsse	6–7^{(4–7)}, 6–3, 6–1, 5–7, 1–6
Loss	4	IV	Singles	Belgium	Xavier Malisse	6–4, 3–6, 5–7, 6–7^{(5–7)}
▼2–3; 4–6 February 2000; Saal Sports Hall, Zürich, Switzerland; World Group first round; carpet(i) surface
Win	5	II	Singles	Australia	Mark Philippoussis	6–4, 7–6^{(7–3)}, 4–6, 6–4
Win	6	III	Doubles (with Lorenzo Manta)	Australia	Wayne Arthurs / Sandon Stolle	3–6, 6–3, 6–4, 7–6^{(7–4)}
Loss	7	IV	Singles	Australia	Lleyton Hewitt	2–6, 6–3, 6–7^{(2–7)}, 1–6
▲5–0; 21–23 July 2000; Kreuzbleiche S. Hall, St Gallen, Switzerland; World Group play-offs; carpet(i) surface
Win	8	II	Singles	Belarus	Vladimir Voltchkov	4–6, 7–5, 7–6^{(7–1)}, 5–7, 6–2
Win	9	III	Doubles (with Lorenzo Manta)	Belarus	Max Mirnyi / Vladimir Voltchkov	2–6, 7–6^{(7–5)}, 7–5, 7–6^{(7–4)}
▲3–2; 9–11 February 2001; St. Jakob Arena, Basel, Switzerland; World Group first round; hard(i) surface
Win	10	I	Singles	United States	Todd Martin	6–4, 7–6^{(7–3)}, 4–6, 6–1
Win	11	III	Doubles (with Lorenzo Manta)	United States	Jan-Michael Gambill / Justin Gimelstob	6–4, 6–2, 7–5
Win	12	IV	Singles	United States	Jan-Michael Gambill	7–5, 6–2, 4–6, 6–2
▼2–3; 6–8 April 2001; Patinoires du Littoral, Neuchâtel, Switzerland; World Group quarterfinal; carpet(i) surface
Loss	13	II	Singles	France	Nicolas Escudé	4–6, 7–6^{(7–1)}, 3–6, 4–6
Win	14	III	Doubles (with Lorenzo Manta)	France	Cédric Pioline / Fabrice Santoro	5–7, 6–3, 7–6^{(7–4)} 6–7^{(3–7)}, 9–7
Win	15	IV	Singles	France	Arnaud Clément	6–4, 3–6, 7–6^{(7–5)} 6–4
▼2–3; 8–10 February 2002; Olympic Stadium, Moscow, Russia, World Group first round; clay(i) surface
Win	16	I	Singles	Russia	Marat Safin	7–5, 6–1, 6–2
Loss	17	III	Doubles (with Marc Rosset)	Russia	Yevgeny Kafelnikov / Marat Safin	2–6, 6–7^{(6–8)}, 7–6^{(7–0)} 2–6
Win	18	IV	Singles	Russia	Yevgeny Kafelnikov	7–6^{(8–6)}, 6–1, 6–1
▲3–2; 22–24 September 2002; Complexe Al Amal, Casablanca, Morocco; World Group play-offs; clay surface
Win	19	II	Singles	Morocco	Hicham Arazi	6–3, 6–2, 6–1
Win	20	III	Doubles (with George Bastl)	Morocco	Karim Alami / Younes El Aynaoui	6–4, 6–1, 6–4
Win	21	IV	Singles	Morocco	Younes El Aynaoui	6–3, 6–2, 6–1
▲3–2; 7–9 February 2003; Gelredome, Arnhem, Netherlands; World Group first round; carpet(i) surface
Win	22	II	Singles	Netherlands	Raemon Sluiter	6–2, 6–1, 6–3
Loss	23	III	Doubles (with George Bastl)	Netherlands	Paul Haarhuis / Martin Verkerk	6–3, 3–6, 4–6, 5–7
Win	24	IV	Singles	Netherlands	Sjeng Schalken	7–6^{(7–2)}, 6–4, 7–5
▲3–2; 7–9 February 2003; Zenith Stadium, Toulouse, France; World Group quarterfinal; hard(i) surface
Win	25	II	Singles	France	Nicolas Escudé	6–4, 7–5, 6–2
Win	26	III	Doubles (with Marc Rosset)	France	Nicolas Escudé / Fabrice Santoro	6–3, 6–4, 6–3
Win	27	IV	Singles	France	Fabrice Santoro	6–1, 6–0, 6–2
▼2–3; 19–21 September 2003; Rod Laver Arena, Melbourne, Australia; World Group semifinal; hard surface
Win	28	II	Singles	Australia	Mark Philippoussis	6–3, 6–4, 7–6^{(7–3)}
Loss	29	III	Doubles (with Marc Rosset)	Australia	Wayne Arthurs / Todd Woodbridge	6–4, 6–7^{(5–7)}, 7–5, 4–6, 4–6
Loss	30	IV	Singles	Australia	Lleyton Hewitt	7–5, 6–2, 6–7^{(4–7)}, 5–7, 1–6
▲3–2; 6–8 February 2004; Sala Polivalenta, Bucharest, Romania; World Group first round; clay(i) surface
Win	31	II	Singles	Romania	Victor Hănescu	7–6^{(7–4)}, 6–3, 6–1
Win	32	III	Doubles (with Yves Allegro)	Romania	Andrei Pavel / Gabriel Trifu	6–3, 1–6, 6–3, 3–6, 10–8
Win	33	IV	Singles	Romania	Andrei Pavel	6–3, 6–2, 7–5
▼2–3; 9–11 April 2004; CIG de Malley, Prilly, Switzerland; World Group quarterfinals; hard(i) surface
Win	34	II	Singles	France	Nicolas Escudé	6–2, 6–4, 6–4
Loss	35	III	Doubles (with Yves Allegro)	France	Nicolas Escudé / Michaël Llodra	7–6^{(7–4)}, 3–6, 6–7^{(5–7)}, 3–6
Win	36	IV	Singles	France	Arnaud Clément	6–2, 7–5, 6–4
▲5–0; 23–25 September 2005; Palexpo, Geneva, Switzerland; World Group play-offs; clay(i) surface
Win	37	I	Singles	(United Kingdom) Great Britain	Alan Mackin	6–0, 6–0, 6–2
Win	38	III	Doubles (with Yves Allegro)	(United Kingdom) Great Britain	Andy Murray / Greg Rusedski	7–5, 2–6, 7–6^{(7–1)}, 6–2
▲4–1; 22–24 September 2006; Palexpo, Geneva, Switzerland; World Group play-offs; hard(i) surface
Win	39	II	Singles	(Serbia and Montenegro) Serbia & Monten.	Janko Tipsarević	6–3, 6–2, 6–2
Win	40	III	Doubles (with Yves Allegro)	(Serbia and Montenegro) Serbia & Monten.	Ilija Bozoljac / Nenad Zimonjić	7–6^{(7–3)}, 6–4, 6–4
Win	41	IV	Singles	(Serbia and Montenegro) Serbia & Monten.	Novak Djokovic	6–3, 6–2, 6–3
▼2–3; 21–23 September 2007; Sazka Arena, Prague, Czech Republic; World Group play-offs; carpet(i) surface
Win	42	II	Singles	Czech Republic	Radek Štěpánek	6–3, 6–2, 6–7^{(4–7)}, 7–6^{(7–5)}
Loss	43	III	Doubles (with Yves Allegro)	Czech Republic	Tomáš Berdych / Radek Štěpánek	6–3, 7–5, 6–7^{(7–9)}, 4–6, 4–6
Win	44	IV	Singles	Czech Republic	Tomáš Berdych	7–6^{(7–6)}, 7–6^{(12–10)}, 6–3
▲4–1; 19–21 September 2008; Centre Intercommunal de Glace Malley, Lausanne, Switzerland; World Group play-offs; hard(i) surface
Win	45	II	Singles	Belgium	Kristof Vliegen	7–6^{(7–4)}, 6–2, 6–2
Win	46	III	Doubles (with Stan Wawrinka)	Belgium	Xavier Malisse / Olivier Rochus	4–6, 7–6^{(8–6)}, 6–3, 6–3
▲4–1; 18–20 September 2009; Centro Sportivo "Valletta Cambiaso", Genoa, Italy; World Group play-offs; clay surface
Win	47	II	Singles	Italy	Simone Bolelli	6–3, 6–4, 6–1
Win	48	IV	Singles	Italy	Potito Starace	6–3, 6–0, 6–2
▲5–0; 8–10 July 2011; PostFinance-Arena, Bern, Switzerland; Group I Europe/Africa quarterfinal; hard(i) surface
Win	49	II	Singles	Portugal	Rui Machado	5–7, 6–4, 6–4, 6–2
Win	50	III	Doubles (with Stan Wawrinka)	Portugal	Frederico Gil / Leonardo Tavares	6–3, 6–4, 6–4
▲3–2; 16–18 September 2011; Royal Sydney Golf Club, Sydney, Australia; World Group play-offs; grass surface
Win	51	II	Singles	Australia	Lleyton Hewitt	5–7, 7–6^{(7–5)}, 6–2, 6–3
Loss	52	III	Doubles (with Stan Wawrinka)	Australia	Chris Guccione / Lleyton Hewitt	6–2, 4–6, 2–6, 6–7^{(5–7)}
Win	53	IV	Singles	Australia	Bernard Tomic	6–2, 7–5, 3–6, 6–3
▼0–5; 10–12 February 2012; Forum Fribourg, Fribourg, Switzerland; World Group first round; clay(i) surface
Loss	54	II	Singles	United States	John Isner	6–4, 3–6, 6–7^{(4–7)}, 2–6
Loss	55	III	Doubles (with Stan Wawrinka)	United States	Mike Bryan / Mardy Fish	6–4, 3–6, 3–6, 3–6
▲3–2; 14–16 September 2012; Westergasfabriek, Amsterdam, Netherlands; World Group play-offs; clay surface
Win	56	I	Singles	Netherlands	Thiemo de Bakker	6–3, 6–4, 6–4
Loss	57	III	Doubles (with Stan Wawrinka)	Netherlands	Robin Haase / Jean-Julien Rojer	4–6, 2–6, 7–5, 3–6
Win	58	IV	Singles	Netherlands	Robin Haase	6–1, 6–4, 6–4
▲3–2; 31 January – 2 February 2014; SPENS, Novi Sad, Serbia; World Group first round; hard(i) surface
Win	59	I	Singles	Serbia	Ilija Bozoljac	6–4, 7–5, 6–2
▲3–2; 4–6 April 2014; Palexpo, Geneva, Switzerland; World Group quarterfinal; hard(i) surface
Win	60	II	Singles	Kazakhstan	Mikhail Kukushkin	6–4, 6–4, 6–2
Loss	61	III	Doubles (with Stan Wawrinka)	Kazakhstan	Andrey Golubev / Aleksandr Nedovyesov	4–6, 6–7^{(5–7)}, 6–4, 6–7^{(6–8)}
Win	62	V	Singles (decider)	Kazakhstan	Andrey Golubev	7–6^{(7–0)}, 6–2, 6–3
▲3–2; 12–14 September 2014; Palexpo, Geneva, Switzerland; World Group semifinal; hard(i) surface
Win	63	I	Singles	Italy	Simone Bolelli	7–6^{(7–5)}, 6–4, 6–4
Win	64	IV	Singles	Italy	Fabio Fognini	6–2, 6–3, 7–6^{(7–4)}
▲3–1; 21–23 November 2014; Stade Pierre-Mauroy, Lille, France; World Group final; clay(i) surface
Loss	65	II	Singles	France	Gaël Monfils	1–6, 4–6, 3–6
Win	66	III	Doubles (with Stan Wawrinka)	France	Julien Benneteau / Richard Gasquet	6–3, 7–5, 6–4
Win	67	IV	Singles	France	Richard Gasquet	6–4, 6–2, 6–2
▲4–1; 18–20 September 2015; Palexpo, Geneva, Switzerland; World Group play-offs; hard(i) surface
Win	68	II	Singles	Netherlands	Jesse Huta Galung	6–3, 6–4, 6–3
Loss	69	III	Doubles (with Marco Chiudinelli)	Netherlands	Matwé Middelkoop / Thiemo de Bakker	6–7^{(7–9)}, 6–4, 6–4, 4–6, 1–6
Win	70	IV	Singles	Netherlands	Thiemo de Bakker	6–3, 6–2, 6–4

==== Wins: 1 ====
Edition	(Switzerland) Swiss Team	Rounds/Opponents
2014 Davis Cup	Roger Federer; Stan Wawrinka; Marco Chiudinelli; Michael Lammer	1R: SUI 3–2 SRB; QF: SUI 3–2 KAZ; SF: SUI 3–2 ITA; F: SUI 3–1 FRA

=== Laver Cup: 4 (3 titles, 1 runner-up) ===
==== (8 wins – 4 losses) ====
Matches by type Singles (6–0) Doubles (2–4)	Matches by points scoring Day 1, 1 point (1–2) Day 2, 2 points (4–0) Day 3, 3 points (3–2)	Matches by venue Europe (6–2) Rest of the World (2–2)

- ▲ ▼ indicates the result of the Laver Cup match followed by the score, date, place of event and the court surface.

Result	No.	Day (points)	Match type (partner if any)	Opponent team	Opponent player(s)	Score
▲15–9; 22–24 September 2017; O2 Arena, Prague, Czech Republic, Hard(i) surface
Win	1	Day 2 (2 points)	Singles	Team World	(United States) Sam Querrey	6–4, 6–2
Win	2	Day 2 (2 points)	Doubles (with (Spain) Rafael Nadal)	Team World	(United States) Sam Querrey / (United States) Jack Sock	6–4, 1–6, [10–5]
Win	3	Day 3 (3 points)	Singles	Team World	(Australia) Nick Kyrgios	4–6, 7–6^{(8–6)}, [11–9]
▲13–8; 21–23 September 2018; United Center, Chicago, United States, Hard(i) surface
Loss	4	Day 1 (1 point)	Doubles (with (Serbia) Novak Djokovic)	Team World	(South Africa) Kevin Anderson / (United States) Jack Sock	7–6^{(7–5)}, 3–6, [6–10]
Win	5	Day 2 (2 points)	Singles	Team World	(Australia) Nick Kyrgios	6–3, 6–2
Loss	6	Day 3 (3 points)	Doubles (with (Germany) Alexander Zverev)	Team World	(United States) John Isner / (United States) Jack Sock	6–4, 6–7^{(2–7)}, [9–11]
Win	7	Day 3 (3 points)	Singles	Team World	(United States) John Isner	6–7^{(5–7)}, 7–6^{(8–6)}, [10–7]
▲13–11; 20–22 September 2019; Palexpo, Geneva, Switzerland, Hard(i) surface
Win	8	Day 1 (1 point)	Doubles (with (Germany) Alexander Zverev)	Team World	(Canada) Denis Shapovalov / (United States) Jack Sock	6–3, 7–5
Win	9	Day 2 (2 points)	Singles	Team World	(Australia) Nick Kyrgios	6–7^{(5–7)}, 7–5, [10–7]
Loss	10	Day 3 (3 points)	Doubles (with (Greece) Stefanos Tsitsipas)	Team World	(United States) John Isner / (United States) Jack Sock	7–5, 4–6, [8–10]
Win	11	Day 3 (3 points)	Singles	Team World	(United States) John Isner	6–4, 7–6^{(7–3)}
▼8–13; 23–25 September 2022; The O2 Arena, London, United Kingdom, Hard(i) surface
Loss	12	Day 1 (1 point)	Doubles (with (Spain) Rafael Nadal)	Team World	(United States) Jack Sock / (United States) Frances Tiafoe	6–4, 6–7^{(2–7)}, [9–11]

==== Wins: 3 ====
Edition	Team Europe	Rounds/Opponents
2017 Laver Cup	(Switzerland) Roger Federer (Spain) Rafael Nadal (Germany) Alexander Zverev (Croatia) Marin Čilić (Austria) Dominic Thiem (Czech Republic) Tomáš Berdych	F: EUR 15–9 WOR
2018 Laver Cup	(Switzerland) Roger Federer (Serbia) Novak Djokovic (Germany) Alexander Zverev (Bulgaria) Grigor Dimitrov (Belgium) David Goffin (United Kingdom) Kyle Edmund	F: EUR 13–8 WOR
2019 Laver Cup	(Switzerland) Roger Federer (Spain) Rafael Nadal (Austria) Dominic Thiem (Germany) Alexander Zverev (Greece) Stefanos Tsitsipas (Italy) Fabio Fognini	F: EUR 13–11 WOR

=== Hopman Cup: 3 (3 titles) ===
==== (27 wins – 9 losses) ====
Legend
Ties (14–4)
Rubbers (27–9)

Matches by Type
Singles (14–4)
Mixed doubles (13–5)

- ▲ ▼ indicates the result of the Hopman Cup match followed by the score, date, place of event, competition phase, and the court surface.

Result	No.	Match type (partner if any)	Opponent nation	Opponent player(s)	Score
▲3–0; 31 December 2000; Burswood Entertainment Complex, Perth, Australia; round robin; hard(i) surface
Win	1	Singles	Thailand	Paradorn Srichaphan	6–4, 6–2
Win	2	Mixed Doubles (with Martina Hingis)	Thailand	Tamarine Tanasugarn / Paradorn Srichaphan	6–0, 6–1
▲3–0; 3 January 2001; Burswood Entertainment Complex, Perth, Australia; round robin; hard(i) surface
Win	3	Singles	Australia	Richard Fromberg	6–3, 6–2
Win	4	Mixed Doubles (with Martina Hingis)	Australia	Nicole Pratt / Richard Fromberg	6–1, 6–3
▲2–1; 5 January 2001; Burswood Entertainment Complex, Perth, Australia; round robin; hard(i) surface
Loss	5	Singles	South Africa	Wayne Ferreira	3–6, 6–3, 3–6
Win	6	Mixed Doubles (with Martina Hingis)	South Africa	Amanda Coetzer / Wayne Ferreira	6–2, 6–3
▲2–1; 6 January 2001; Burswood Entertainment Complex, Perth, Australia; final; hard(i) surface
Win	7	Singles	United States	Jan-Michael Gambill	6–4, 6–3
Loss	8	Mixed Doubles (with Martina Hingis)	United States	Monica Seles / Jan-Michael Gambill	2–6, 6–4, 6–7^{(5–7)}
▼0–3; 30 December 2001; Burswood Entertainment Complex, Perth, Australia; round robin; hard(i) surface
Loss	9	Singles	Australia	Lleyton Hewitt	3–6, 6–0, 4–6
Loss	10	Mixed Doubles (with Miroslava Vavrinec)	Australia	Alicia Molik / Lleyton Hewitt	3–6, 1–6
▼0–3; 1 January 2002; Burswood Entertainment Complex, Perth, Australia; round robin; hard(i) surface
Loss	11	Singles	Spain	Tommy Robredo	6–7^{(7–9)}, 2–6
Loss	12	Mixed Doubles (with Miroslava Vavrinec)	Spain	Aranxta Sánchez-Vicario / Tommy Robredo	2–6, 3–6
▲2–1; 3 January 2002; Burswood Entertainment Complex, Perth, Australia; round robin; hard(i) surface
Win	13	Singles	Argentina	Mariano Zabaleta	6–2, 6–3
Win	14	Mixed Doubles (with Miroslava Vavrinec)	Argentina	Paola Suárez / Mariano Zabaleta	6–3, 6–7^{(3–7)}, [10–4]
▲3–0; 2 January 2017; Perth Arena, Perth, Australia; round robin; hard(i) surface
Win	15	Singles	Great Britain	Daniel Evans	6–3, 6–4
Win	16	Mixed Doubles (with Belinda Bencic)	Great Britain	Heather Watson / Daniel Evans	4–0, 4–1
▲2–1; 4 January 2017; Perth Arena, Perth, Australia; round robin; hard(i) surface
Loss	17	Singles	Germany	Alexander Zverev	6–7^{(1–7)}, 7–6^{(7–4)}, 6–7^{(4–7)}
Win	18	Mixed Doubles (with Belinda Bencic)	Germany	Andrea Petkovic / Alexander Zverev	4–1, 4–2
▼1–2; 6 January 2017; Perth Arena, Perth, Australia; round robin; hard(i) surface
Win	19	Singles	France	Richard Gasquet	6–1, 6–4
Loss	20	Mixed Doubles (with Belinda Bencic)	France	Kristina Mladenovic / Richard Gasquet	2–4, 2–4
▲3–0; 30 December 2017; Perth Arena, Perth, Australia; round robin; hard(i) surface
Win	21	Singles	Japan	Yūichi Sugita	6–4, 6–3
Win	22	Mixed Doubles (with Belinda Bencic)	Japan	Naomi Osaka / Yūichi Sugita	2–4, 4–1, 4–3^{(5–1)}
▲3–0; 2 January 2018; Perth Arena, Perth, Australia; round robin; hard(i) surface
Win	23	Singles	Russia	Karen Khachanov	6–3, 7–6^{(10–8)}
Win	24	Mixed Doubles (with Belinda Bencic)	Russia	Anastasia Pavlyuchenkova / Karen Khachanov	4–3^{(5–1)}, 3–4^{(3–5)}, 4–1
▲3–0; 4 January 2018; Perth Arena, Perth, Australia; round robin; hard(i) surface
Win	25	Singles	United States	Jack Sock	7–6^{(7–5)}, 7–5
Win	26	Mixed Doubles (with Belinda Bencic)	United States	CoCo Vandeweghe / Jack Sock	4–3^{(5–3)}, 4–2
▲2–1; 6 January 2018; Perth Arena, Perth, Australia; final; hard(i) surface
Win	27	Singles	Germany	Alexander Zverev	6–7^{(4–7)}, 6–0, 6–2
Win	28	Mixed Doubles (with Belinda Bencic)	Germany	Angelique Kerber / Alexander Zverev	4–3^{(5–3)}, 4–2
▲3–0; 30 December 2018; Perth Arena, Perth, Australia; round robin; hard(i) surface
Win	29	Singles	Great Britain	Cameron Norrie	6–1, 6–1
Win	30	Mixed Doubles (with Belinda Bencic)	Great Britain	Katie Boulter / Cameron Norrie	4–3^{(5–4)}, 4–1
▲2–1; 1 January 2019; Perth Arena, Perth, Australia; round robin; hard(i) surface
Win	31	Singles	United States	Frances Tiafoe	6–4, 6–1
Win	32	Mixed Doubles (with Belinda Bencic)	United States	Serena Williams / Frances Tiafoe	4–2, 4–3^{(5–3)}
▼1–2; 3 January 2019; Perth Arena, Perth, Australia; round robin; hard(i) surface
Win	33	Singles	Greece	Stefanos Tsitsipas	7–6^{(7–5)}, 7–6^{(7–4)}
Loss	34	Mixed Doubles (with Belinda Bencic)	Greece	Maria Sakkari / Stefanos Tsitsipas	3–4^{(4–5)}, 4–2, 3–4^{(3–5)}
▲2–1; 5 January 2019; Perth Arena, Perth, Australia; final; hard(i) surface
Win	35	Singles	Germany	Alexander Zverev	6–4, 6–2
Win	36	Mixed Doubles (with Belinda Bencic)	Germany	Angelique Kerber / Alexander Zverev	4–0, 1–4, 4–3^{(5–4)}

==== Wins: 3 ====
Edition	(Switzerland) Swiss Team	Rounds/Opponents
2001 Hopman Cup	Martina Hingis; Roger Federer	RR: SUI 3–0 THA; RR: SUI 3–0 AUS; RR: SUI 2–1 RSA; F: SUI 2–1 USA
2018 Hopman Cup	Belinda Bencic; Roger Federer	RR: SUI 3–0 JPN; RR: SUI 3–0 RUS; RR: SUI 3–0 USA; F: SUI 2–1 GER
2019 Hopman Cup	Belinda Bencic; Roger Federer	RR: SUI 3–0 GBR; RR: SUI 2–1 USA; RR: SUI 1–2 GRE; F: SUI 2–1 GER

== Team Tennis Leagues ==
=== League finals: 1 (1 championship) ===
Finals by leagues International Premier Tennis League (IPTL) (1–0)	Finals by club teams Micromax Indian Aces (1–0)	League table results 1st place (1) 2nd place (0) 3rd place (1)

Place	Date	League	Locations	Surfaces	Team	Teammates	Opponent teams
Champions (1st)	Dec 2014	International Premier; Tennis League (IPTL)	Philippines, UAE, India, Singapore	Hard (i), Hard	(India) Indian Aces	(United States) Pete Sampras (France) Gaël Monfils (France) Fabrice Santoro (India) Rohan Bopanna (Serbia) Ana Ivanovic (India) Sania Mirza	(United Arab Emirates) UAE Royals: Runners-up (2nd) (Philippines) Manila Mavericks: 3rd Singapore Slammers: 4th
3rd	Dec 2015	International Premier; Tennis League (IPTL)	Philippines, UAE, India, Singapore, Japan	Hard (i), Hard	UAE Royals	(Czech Republic) Tomáš Berdych (Croatia) Marin Čilić (Croatia) Goran Ivanišević (Canada) Daniel Nestor (Serbia) Ana Ivanovic (France) Kristina Mladenovic	Singapore Slammers: Champions (2nd) (India) Indian Aces: Runners-up (1st) (Philippines) Philippine Mavericks: 4th Japan Warriors: 5th

== Exhibitions ==
=== Tournament finals ===
==== Singles ====
Result	Date	Tournament	Surface	Opponent	Score
Loss	Apr 2000	River Oaks International Tennis Tournament, United States	Clay	(Sweden) Magnus Larsson	6–3, 1–6, 5–7
Win	Dec 2001	St. Anton Tele.Ring Tennis Trophy, Austria	Hard (i)	(Austria) Markus Hipfl	2–6, 7–6^{(7–2)}, [10–7]
Win	Dec 2003	Tennis Dream Night, Switzerland	Hard (i)	(France) Yannick Noah	0–1^{(5–7)}, 1–0^{(9–7)}, [1–0]
Loss	Jan 2004	Watsons Water Champions Challenge, Hong Kong	Hard	(Spain) Juan Carlos Ferrero	4–6, 4–6
Win	Jan 2005	Kooyong Classic, Australia	Hard	(United States) Andy Roddick	6–4, 7–5
Loss	Jan 2007	Kooyong Classic, Australia	Hard	(United States) Andy Roddick	2–6, 6–3, 3–6
Win	Jan 2009	Kooyong Classic, Australia	Hard	(Switzerland) Stan Wawrinka	6–1, 6–3
Loss	Jan 2011	Mubadala Championship, United Arab Emirates	Hard	(Spain) Rafael Nadal	6–7^{(4–7)}, 6–7^{(3–7)}

==== Third & Fifth place matches ====
Result	Date	Tournament	Surface	Opponent	Score
3rd	Jan 2004	Kooyong Classic, Australia	Hard	(United States) Andy Roddick	w/o
5th	Jan 2006	Kooyong Classic, Australia	Hard	(Belarus) Max Mirnyi	6–7^{(1–7)}, 6–4, 7–6^{(7–1)}
3rd	Jan 2010	Mubadala Championship, United Arab Emirates	Hard	(Spain) David Ferrer	6–1, 7–5
4th	Dec 2011	Mubadala Championship, United Arab Emirates	Hard	(Spain) Rafael Nadal	1–6, 5–7

==== Doubles ====
Result	Date	Tournament	Surface	Partner	Opponents	Score
Win	Jan 2004	Watsons Water Champions Challenge, Hong Kong	Hard	(Czech Republic) / (United States) Martina Navratilova	(Belarus) Max Mirnyi (United States) Venus Williams	6–4, 6–2

=== Exhibition matches ===
==== Singles ====
Result	Date	Tournament	Surface	Opponent	Score
Win	Apr 2005	Tennis Festival, Tennis Club Old Boys, Switzerland	Clay	(Switzerland) Marco Chiudinelli	7–6^{(7–3)}, 6–4
Win	Nov 2006	Seoul Exhibition, Korea	Hard (i)	(Spain) Rafael Nadal	6–3, 3–6, 6–3
Loss	May 2007	Battle of Surfaces, Spain	Grass/Clay	(Spain) Rafael Nadal	5–7, 6–4, 6–7^{(10–12)}
Win	Nov 2007	Clash of Times 1, Korea	Carpet	(United States) Pete Sampras	6–4, 6–3
Win	Nov 2007	Clash of Times 2, Malaysia	Carpet	(United States) Pete Sampras	7–6^{(8–6)}, 7–6^{(7–5)}
Loss	Nov 2007	Clash of Times 3, Macau	Carpet	(United States) Pete Sampras	6–7^{(6–8)}, 4–6
Win	Mar 2008	Madison Square Garden Showdown, United States	Hard (i)	(United States) Pete Sampras	6–3, 6–7^{(4–7)}, 7–6^{(8–6)}
Win	Nov 2008	Kuala Lumpur Exhibition, Malaysia	Hard (i)	(United States) James Blake	7–6^{(9–7)}
Win	Nov 2008	Macau Exhibition, Malaysia	Hard (i)	(United States) James Blake	6–4, 6–4
Loss	Mar 2011	Nike Clash of the Champions, United States	Hard (i)	(Spain) Rafael Nadal	5–7
Loss	Mar 2012	Madison Square Garden Showdown, United States	Hard (i)	(United States) Andy Roddick	5–7, 6–7^{(7–9)}
Win	Jan 2014	A Night with Roger and Friends, Australia	Hard (i)	(France) Jo-Wilfried Tsonga	6–7^{(5–7)}, 6–3, 7–5
Win	Jan 2015	Fast4 Sydney, Australia	Hard (i)	(Australia) Lleyton Hewitt	4–3^{(5–3)}, 2–4, 3–4^{(3–5)}, 4–0, 4–2
Loss	Mar 2015	Madison Square Garden Showdown, United States	Hard (i)	(Bulgaria) Grigor Dimitrov	2–6, 6–1, 5–7
Win	Nov 2015	Jarkko Nieminen "The Final Night", Finland	Hard (i)	(Finland) Jarkko Nieminen	7–6^{(7–4)}, 7–6^{(9–7)}
Win	Dec 2019	Hangzhou Tmall Tennis Invitational Tournament, China	Hard (i)	(Germany) Alexander Zverev	6–1, 6–7^{(7–9)}, 6–2
Win	Jan 2026	AO Opening Week, Australia	Hard	(Norway) Casper Ruud	[7–2]
Win	Aug 2026	Roger Federer: An Icon Returns to NY, United States	Hard	(United States) Andy Roddick	6–3

==== Doubles ====
Result	Date	Tournament	Surface	Partner	Opponents	Score
Loss	Nov 2008	Kuala Lumpur Exhibition, Malaysia	Hard (i)	(Sweden) Björn Borg	(United States) James Blake (United States) John McEnroe	5–7
Win	Mar 2011	Nike Clash of the Champions, United States	Hard (i)	(Russia) Maria Sharapova	(Spain) Rafael Nadal (Belarus) Victoria Azarenka	6–3
Loss	Nov 2015	Jarkko Nieminen "The Final Night", Finland	Hard (i)	(Sweden) Peter Forsberg	(Finland) Jarkko Nieminen (Finland) Teemu Selänne	3–6
Loss	Dec 2019	Hangzhou Tmall Tennis Invitational Tournament, China	Hard (i)	(Germany) Alexander Zverev	(United States) Bob Bryan (United States) Mike Bryan	6–7^{(5–7)}, 6–7^{(5–7)}
Win	Nov 2022	Uniqlo LifeWear Day Tokyo 2022 with Roger Federer, Japan	Hard (i)	(Japan) Shingo Kunieda	(Japan) Kurumi Nara (United Kingdom) Gordon Reid	[8–6]
Win	Oct 2024	Roger & Friends Celebrity Doubles, China	Hard	(Hong Kong) Eason Chan	(China) Zhang Zhizhen (China) Fan Zhendong	[9–7], [7–6]
Win	Oct 2025	Roger & Friends Celebrity Doubles, China	Hard	(Hong Kong) Donnie Yen	(China) Zheng Jie (China) Wu Lei	[5–7], [10–8], [7–1]
Win	Jan 2026	AO Opening Ceremony, Australia	Hard	(United States) Andre Agassi/ (Australia) Ashleigh Barty	(Australia) Lleyton Hewitt (Australia) Pat Rafter	2–4, 4–2, 4–2
Win	Aug 2026	Roger Federer: An Icon Returns to NY, United States	Hard	(United States) John McEnroe	(United States) Andre Agassi (United States) Andy Roddick	7–5

=== Charity matches ===
==== Singles ====
Result	Date	Tournament	Surface	Opponent	Score
Loss	Mar 2005	ATP All Star Rally for Relief for UNICEF, United States	Hard	(United States) Andre Agassi	[9–11]
Win	Dec 2010	Match for Africa, Switzerland	Hard (i)	(Spain) Rafael Nadal	4–6, 6–3, 6–3
Loss	Dec 2010	Joining Forces for the Benefit of Children, Spain	Hard (i)	(Spain) Rafael Nadal	6–7^{(3–7)}, 6–4, 1–6
Win	Dec 2014	Match for Africa 2, Switzerland	Hard (i)	(Switzerland) Stan Wawrinka	7–6^{(7–4)}, 6–4
Win	Apr 2017	Match for Africa 3, Switzerland	Hard (i)	(United Kingdom) Andy Murray	6–3, 7–6^{(8–6)}
Win	Apr 2017	Match for Africa 4, United States	Hard (i)	(United States) John Isner	6–4, 7–6^{(9–7)}
Win	Nov 2017	Match for UNICEF, Scotland	Hard (i)	(United Kingdom) Andy Murray	6–3, 3–6, [10–6]
Win	Mar 2018	Match for Africa 5, United States	Hard (i)	(United States) Jack Sock	7–6^{(11–9)}, 6–4
Win	Oct 2019	Uniqlo LifeWear Day Tokyo Charity Match, Japan	Hard (i)	(United States) John Isner	6–3, 7–6^{(7–3)}
Win	Jan 2020	AO Rally for Relief, Australia	Hard	(Australia) Nick Kyrgios	7–6^{(8–6)}
Win	Feb 2020	Match in Africa 6, South Africa	Hard	(Spain) Rafael Nadal	6–4, 3–6, 6–3

==== Doubles ====
Result	Date	Tournament	Surface	Partner	Opponents	Score
Win	Mar 2010	Hit for Haiti 2, United States	Hard	(United States) Pete Sampras	(United States) Andre Agassi (Spain) Rafael Nadal	8–6
Win	Apr 2017	Match for Africa 4, United States	Hard (i)	(United States) Bill Gates	(United States) John Isner (United States) Mike McCready	6–4
Win	Mar 2018	Match for Africa 5, United States	Hard (i)	(United States) Bill Gates	(United States) Jack Sock (Australia) Savannah Guthrie	6–3
Loss	Oct 2019	Uniqlo LifeWear Day Tokyo Charity Match, Japan	Hard (i)	(Japan) Shingo Kunieda	(United States) John Isner (United Kingdom) Gordon Reid	[9–10]
Win	Feb 2020	Match in Africa 6, South Africa	Hard	(United States) Bill Gates	(Spain) Rafael Nadal (South Africa) Trevor Noah	6–3

=== Showcase matches ===
Result	Date	Tournament	Surface	Partner	Opponents	Score
No-Winner	Aug 2026	International Tennis Hall of Fame Celebrity Pro Classic, Newport, United States	Grass	(Czech Republic) / (United States) Martina Navratilova	(Argentina) Gabriela Sabatini (Russia) Marat Safin	No-Score
No-Winner	Aug 2026	International Tennis Hall of Fame Celebrity Pro Classic, Newport, United States	Grass	(Sweden) Stefan Edberg	(United States) John McEnroe (Australia) Lleyton Hewitt	No-Score

== Coaches ==
(Czech Republic) Adolf Kacovský (1989–1991)
(Australia) Peter Carter (1991–1994, 1996–1999)
(Switzerland) Reto Staubli (1995–1996, 2003)
(Sweden) Peter Lundgren (1999–2003)
(Switzerland) Pierre Paganini (Fitness Coach) (2000–2022)
(Australia) Tony Roche (2005–2007)
(Switzerland) Severin Lüthi (2007–2022)
(Spain) José Higueras (2008)
(United States) Paul Annacone (2010–2013)
(Sweden) Stefan Edberg (2013–2015)
(Croatia) Ivan Ljubičić (2016–2022)

=== Team competitions ===
Result	Date	Tournament	Surface	Team	Partners	Opponent team	Opponent players	Score
Win	May 2009	Masters Guinot-Mary Cohr, Paris, France	Clay	Team Guinot	(Russia) Marat Safin (C) (Spain) Rafael Nadal (United Kingdom) Andy Murray (Spain) Tommy Robredo (France) Gaël Monfils	Team Mary Cohr	(United States) James Blake (C) (Switzerland) Stan Wawrinka (Cyprus) Marcos Baghdatis (France) Arnaud Clément (France) Fabrice Santoro (France) Paul-Henri Mathieu	4–2
Win	Jan 2010	Hit for Haiti; Melbourne, Australia	Hard	Team Red	(Australia) Lleyton Hewitt (United States) Serena Williams (Australia) Samantha Stosur	Team Blue	(Spain) Rafael Nadal (Serbia) Novak Djokovic (United States) Andy Roddick (Belgium) Kim Clijsters (Australia) Bernard Tomic (S)	7–6
Loss	May 2010	Masters Guinot-Mary Cohr, Paris, France	Clay	Team Mary Cohr	(Spain) David Ferrer (C) (United States) Andy Roddick (Switzerland) Stan Wawrinka (France) Sébastien Grosjean (United States) Mardy Fish	Team Guinot	(France) Michaël Llodra (C) (United Kingdom) Andy Murray (France) Jo-Wilfried Tsonga (Chile) Fernando González (Germany) Rainer Schüttler (Russia) Mikhail Youzhny	2–4
Loss	Jan 2011	Rally for Relief 2, Melbourne, Australia	Hard	Team Gold	(Australia) Lleyton Hewitt (C) (Australia) Samantha Stosur (Swap player) (Serbia) Novak Djokovic (Belgium) Justine Henin (Serbia) Ana Ivanovic (Denmark) Caroline Wozniacki	Team Green	(Australia) Patrick Rafter (C) (Spain) Rafael Nadal (Swap player) (Belgium) Kim Clijsters (United States) Andy Roddick (United Kingdom) Andy Murray (Belarus) Victoria Azarenka (Russia) Vera Zvonareva	43–44

=== Tours ===
==== 2012 South America Tour ====
The South America Tour was sponsored by Gillette and called Gillette Federer Tour. Federer's tour was an exhibition tennis tournament that took place in December 2012 in Brazil, Argentina and Colombia. This tournament is the largest tennis event in Latin America. The exhibition tournament brought together world-class tennis players such as Guillermo Vilas, Tommy Haas, Juan Martín del Potro, Jo-Wilfried Tsonga, José Luis Clerc, Tommy Robredo, Bryan brothers, Serena Williams, Maria Sharapova, Victoria Azarenka, Caroline Wozniacki, as well as the Brazilians Thomaz Bellucci, Bruno Soares and Marcelo Melo, and of course Roger Federer himself. This was also the first time the Swiss visited Brazil.

Result	Date	Tournament	Surface	Opponent	Score
Loss	6 Dec 2012	South America Tour, São Paulo, Brazil	Hard (i)	(Brazil) Thomaz Bellucci	5–7, 6–3, 4–6
Win	8 Dec 2012	South America Tour, São Paulo, Brazil	Hard (i)	(France) Jo-Wilfried Tsonga	7–6^{(7–3)}, 6–3
Win	9 Dec 2012	South America Tour, São Paulo, Brazil	Hard (i)	(Germany) Tommy Haas	6–4, 6–4
Loss	12 Dec 2012	South America Tour, Buenos Aires, Argentina	Hard	(Argentina) Juan Martín del Potro	6–3, 3–6, 4–6
Win	13 Dec 2012	South America Tour, Buenos Aires, Argentina	Hard	(Argentina) Juan Martín del Potro	6–4, 7–6^{(7–1)}
Win	22 Dec 2012	South America Tour, Bogotá, Colombia	Hard (i)	(France) Jo-Wilfried Tsonga	7–6^{(8–6)}, 2–6, 6–3

==== 2019 Latin America Tour ====
With the Latin America Tour, was the second time that Roger Federer toured in South America and first time in Latin American countries. Federer's second tour was an exhibition tennis tournament that took place in November 2019 in Chile, Argentina, Colombia, Mexico and Ecuador.

Result	Date	Tournament	Surface	Opponent	Score
Win	19 Nov 2019	Latin America Tour, Santiago, Chile	Hard (i)	(Germany) Alexander Zverev	6–3, 4–6, 6–4
Loss	20 Nov 2019	Latin America Tour, Buenos Aires, Argentina	Hard (i)	(Germany) Alexander Zverev	6–7^{(3–7)}, 6–7^{(2–7)}
Cancelled	22 Nov 2019	Latin America Tour, Bogotá, Colombia	Hard (i)	(Germany) Alexander Zverev	Due to concerns over violent riots
Win	23 Nov 2019	Latin America Tour, "The Greatest Match", Mexico City, Mexico	Hard	(Germany) Alexander Zverev	3–6, 6–4, 6–2
Win	24 Nov 2019	Latin America Tour, Quito, Ecuador	Hard (i)	(Germany) Alexander Zverev	6–3, 6–4

== See also ==
- List of career achievements by Roger Federer
- Open Era tennis records – men's singles
- All-time tennis records – men's singles
- List of flag bearers for Switzerland at the Olympics
- Sport in Switzerland
