= 2013 ABN AMRO World Tennis Tournament – Wheelchair singles =

Wheelchair singles
- 2013 ABN AMRO World Tennis Tournament

Final
- Champion: (Japan) Shingo Kunieda
- Runner-up: (Netherlands) Maikel Scheffers
- Score: w/o

Events
singles	doubles
WC Singles	WC Doubles
- ABN AMRO World Tennis Tournament

== Draw ==
Key

- Q = Qualifier
- WC = Wild card
- LL = Lucky loser
- Alt = Alternate
- ITF = ITF entry
- PR = Protected ranking
- SR = Special ranking
- SE = Special exempt
- JE = Junior exempt
- JR = Junior Accelerator Programme entrant
- CO = College Accelerator Programme entrant
- NG = Next Gen Accelerator Program entrant
- w/o = Walkover
- r = Retired
- d = Defaulted

Quarterfinals
1	(Japan) Shingo Kunieda	6	4	6
(Netherlands) Ronald Vink	3	6	1
(France) Michaël Jeremiasz	6	6
(Sweden) Stefan Olsson	3	3
(Netherlands) Maikel Scheffers	7	6
(Belgium) Joachim Gérard	5	0
(United Kingdom) Gordon Reid	6	6
2	(France) Stéphane Houdet	1	4

Semifinals
1	(Japan) Shingo Kunieda	6	6
(France) Michaël Jeremiasz	1	0
(Netherlands) Maikel Scheffers	4	6	7
(United Kingdom) Gordon Reid	6	4	5

Final
1	(Japan) Shingo Kunieda	w	/	o
(Netherlands) Maikel Scheffers
