= 1995 ABN AMRO World Tennis Tournament =

- Date: 27 February – 6 March
- Edition: 23rd
- Category: World Series
- Draw: 32S/16D
- Prize money: $575,000
- Surface: Carpet / indoor
- Location: Rotterdam, Netherlands
- Venue: Rotterdam Ahoy

Champions

Singles
- (Netherlands) Richard Krajicek

Doubles
- (Czech Republic) Martin Damm / (Sweden) Anders Järryd
- ABN AMRO World Tennis Tournament

The 1995 ABN AMRO World Tennis Tournament was a men's tennis tournament played on indoor carpet courts. It was the 23rd edition of the event known that year as the ABN AMRO World Tennis Tournament, and was part of the ATP World Series of the 1995 ATP Tour. It took place at the Rotterdam Ahoy indoor sporting arena in Rotterdam, Netherlands, from 27 February through 6 March 1995. Fifthe-seeded Richard Krajicek won the singles title.

The competition saw playing ATP No. 7, Australian Open quarterfinalist and recent Milan titlist Yevgeny Kafelnikov, and Dubai champion and Rotterdam defending finalist Wayne Ferreira. Other seeded players were Australian Open quarterfinalist Andrei Medvedev, Stuttgart Indoor winner Richard Krajicek, Jacco Eltingh, Slava Doseděl and Karel Nováček.

== Finals ==
=== Singles ===
(Netherlands) Richard Krajicek defeated (Netherlands) Paul Haarhuis, 7–6^{(7–5)}, 6–4

- It was Richard Krajicek's 2nd title of the year, and his 9th overall.

=== Doubles ===
(Czech Republic) Martin Damm / (Sweden) Anders Järryd defeated (Spain) Tomás Carbonell / (Spain) Francisco Roig 6–3, 6–2
