= 2013 ABN AMRO World Tennis Tournament =

- Date: 11–17 February
- Edition: 41st
- Category: ATP World Tour 500
- Draw: 32S / 16D
- Prize money: €1,267,875
- Surface: Hard / indoors
- Location: Rotterdam, Netherlands
- Venue: Rotterdam Ahoy

Champions

Singles
- (Argentina) Juan Martín del Potro

Doubles
- (Sweden) Robert Lindstedt / (Serbia) Nenad Zimonjić

Wheelchair singles
- (Japan) Shingo Kunieda

Wheelchair doubles
- (France) Stéphane Houdet / (United Kingdom) Gordon Reid
- ABN AMRO World Tennis Tournament

The 2013 ABN AMRO World Tennis Tournament (or Rotterdam Open) was a men's tennis tournament played on indoor hard courts. It took place at the Rotterdam Ahoy arena in the Dutch city of Rotterdam, between 11 and 17 February 2013. It was the 41st edition of the Rotterdam Open, whose official name is the ABN AMRO World Tennis Tournament. The competition was part of the ATP World Tour 500 series of the 2013 ATP World Tour. Second-seeded Juan Martín del Potro won the singles title.

== Finals ==
=== Singles ===
- (Argentina) Juan Martín del Potro defeated (France) Julien Benneteau, 7–6^{(7–2)}, 6–3

=== Doubles ===
- (Sweden) Robert Lindstedt / (Serbia) Nenad Zimonjić defeated (Netherlands) Thiemo de Bakker / (Netherlands) Jesse Huta Galung, 5–7, 6–3, [10–8]

== Singles main-draw entrants ==
=== Seeds ===
Country	Player	Rank^{1}	Seed
SUI	Roger Federer	2	1
ARG	Juan Martín del Potro	7	2
FRA	Jo-Wilfried Tsonga	8	3
FRA	Richard Gasquet	10	4
FRA	Gilles Simon	14	5
ITA	Andreas Seppi	18	6
POL	Jerzy Janowicz	25	7
GER	Florian Mayer	27	8

- Rankings are as of February 4, 2013.

=== Other entrants ===
The following players received wildcards into the singles main draw:

- (Netherlands) Thiemo de Bakker
- (France) Gaël Monfils
- (Netherlands) Igor Sijsling

The following players received entry from the qualifying draw:

- (Germany) Matthias Bachinger
- (Germany) Daniel Brands
- (Latvia) Ernests Gulbis
- (Italy) Matteo Viola

=== Withdrawals ===
Before the tournament

- (Germany) Philipp Kohlschreiber
- (Slovakia) Lukáš Lacko (right wrist injury)
- (France) Michaël Llodra (illness)
- (Czech Republic) Radek Štěpánek

=== Retirements ===
- (Slovakia) Martin Kližan (cramping)
- (France) Benoît Paire
- (Russia) Mikhail Youzhny (hip injury)

== Doubles main-draw entrants ==
=== Seeds ===
Country	Player	Country	Player	Rank^{1}	Seed
ESP	Marcel Granollers	ESP	Marc López	8	1
PAK	Aisam-ul-Haq Qureshi	NED	Jean-Julien Rojer	27	2
SWE	Robert Lindstedt	SRB	Nenad Zimonjić	31	3
POL	Mariusz Fyrstenberg	POL	Marcin Matkowski	35	4

- Rankings are as of February 4, 2013.

=== Other entrants ===
The following pairs received wildcards into the doubles main draw:

- (Netherlands) Thiemo de Bakker / (Netherlands) Jesse Huta Galung
- (Netherlands) Robin Haase / (Netherlands) Igor Sijsling

The following pairs received entry as alternates:

- (Netherlands) Stephan Fransen / (Netherlands) Wesley Koolhof
- (Poland) Jerzy Janowicz / (Finland) Jarkko Nieminen

=== Withdrawals ===
Before the tournament

- (France) Michaël Llodra (illness)
- (Russia) Mikhail Youzhny (hip injury)
