= 1991 ABN AMRO World Tennis Tournament – Doubles =

Doubles
- 1991 ABN AMRO World Tennis Tournament

Final
- Champions: (United States) Patrick Galbraith (Sweden) Anders Järryd
- Runners-up: (United States) Steve DeVries (Australia) David Macpherson
- Score: 7–6, 6–2

Details
- Draw: 16
- Seeds: 4

Events
Singles	Doubles
- Rotterdam Open

Leonardo Lavalle and Jorge Lozano were the defending champions, but lost in the first round to Patrick Galbraith and Anders Järryd.

Galbraith and Järryd won the title by defeating Steve DeVries and David Macpherson 7–6, 6–2 in the final.

== Seeds ==
1. (Spain) Emilio Sánchez / (Spain) Javier Sánchez (first round)
2. (Italy) Omar Camporese / (Switzerland) Jakob Hlasek (semifinals)
3. (Australia) Todd Woodbridge / (Australia) Mark Woodforde (first round)
4. (United States) Patrick Galbraith / (Sweden) Anders Järryd (champions)

== Draw ==
Key

- Q = Qualifier
- WC = Wild card
- LL = Lucky loser
- Alt = Alternate
- ITF = ITF entry
- PR = Protected ranking
- SR = Special ranking
- SE = Special exempt
- JE = Junior exempt
- JR = Junior Accelerator Programme entrant
- CO = College Accelerator Programme entrant
- NG = Next Gen Accelerator Program entrant
- w/o = Walkover
- r = Retired
- d = Defaulted

=== Draw ===
First round
1	(Spain) E Sánchez (Spain) J Sánchez	6	3
(United Kingdom) J Bates (United Kingdom) N Brown	7	6
(Netherlands) P Haarhuis (Netherlands) M Koevermans	6	6
(United States) S Devries (Australia) D Macpherson	7	7
3	(Australia) T Woodbridge (Australia) M Woodforde	4	4
(Czech Republic) K Nováček (Czechoslovakia) T Smid	6	6
(Spain) S Casal (Australia) P Cash	6	6
(Denmark) M Mortensen (Netherlands) T Nijssen	4	3
Q	(Sweden) P Henricsson (Sweden) N Utgren	5	6
(United States) C Beckman (United States) L Jensen	7	7
(Mexico) L Lavalle (Mexico) J Lozano	1	5
4	(United States) P Galbraith (Sweden) A Järryd	6	7
WC	(Netherlands) M Schapers (Netherlands) J Siemerink	7	6	6
(United Kingdom) A Castle (Czech Republic) C Suk	6	7	3
(Iran) M Bahrami (Czechoslovakia) L Pimek	1	2
2	(Italy) O Camporese (Switzerland) J Hlasek	6	6

Quarterfinals
(United Kingdom) J Bates (United Kingdom) N Brown
(United States) S Devries (Australia) D Macpherson	w/o
(Czech Republic) K Nováček (Czechoslovakia) T Smid	6	6	6
(Spain) S Casal (Australia) P Cash	7	3	2
(United States) C Beckman (United States) L Jensen	4	3
4	(United States) P Galbraith (Sweden) A Järryd	6	6
WC	(Netherlands) M Schapers (Netherlands) J Siemerink	7	1	4
2	(Italy) O Camporese (Switzerland) J Hlasek	6	6	6

Semifinals
(United States) S Devries (Australia) D Macpherson	6	5	7
(Czech Republic) K Nováček (Czechoslovakia) T Smid	1	7	5
4	(United States) P Galbraith (Sweden) A Järryd	6	6
2	(Italy) O Camporese (Switzerland) J Hlasek	2	4

Final
(United States) S Devries (Australia) D Macpherson	6	2
4	(United States) P Galbraith (Sweden) A Järryd	7	6
