= 1978 ABN World Tennis Tournament – Doubles =

Doubles
- 1978 ABN World Tennis Tournament

Final
- Champion: (United States) Fred McNair (Mexico) Raúl Ramírez
- Runner-up: (United States) Bob Lutz (United States) Stan Smith
- Score: 6–2, 6–3

Details
- Draw: 11
- Seeds: 4

Events
Singles	Doubles
- Rotterdam Open

The 1978 ABN World Tennis Tournament – Doubles was an event of the 1978 ABN World Tennis Tournament tennis tournament and was played on indoor carpet courts at Rotterdam Ahoy in the Netherlands, between 3 April and 9 April 1978. The draw comprised 11 teams and four of them were seeded. Second-seeded Wojciech Fibak and Tom Okker were the defending Rotterdam Open doubles champions but lost in the quarterfinals. The fourth-seeded team of Fred McNair and Raúl Ramírez won the doubles title after a win in the final against first-seeded pairing Bob Lutz and Stan Smith, 7–5, 7–5.

== Seeds ==
1. (United States) Bob Lutz / (United States) Stan Smith (final)
2. (Poland) Wojciech Fibak / (Netherlands) Tom Okker (quarterfinals)
3. (United States) Vitas Gerulaitis / (United States) Sandy Mayer (quarterfinals, withdrew)
4. (United States) Fred McNair / (Mexico) Raúl Ramírez (champions)

== Draw ==
Key

- Q = Qualifier
- WC = Wild card
- LL = Lucky loser
- Alt = Alternate
- ITF = ITF entry
- PR = Protected ranking
- SR = Special ranking
- SE = Special exempt
- JE = Junior exempt
- JR = Junior Accelerator Programme entrant
- CO = College Accelerator Programme entrant
- NG = Next Gen Accelerator Program entrant
- w/o = Walkover
- r = Retired
- d = Defaulted

First Round
(South Africa) Raymond Moore (Italy) Tonino Zugarelli	6	4	6
(Netherlands) Wouter Fok (United States) Raymond Pascale	4	6	4
(Sweden) Ove Bengtson (Netherlands) Louk Sanders	2	3
4	(United States) Fred McNair (Mexico) Raúl Ramírez	6	6
(Australia) Syd Ball (Australia) Kim Warwick	3	4
2	(Poland) Wojciech Fibak (Netherlands) Tom Okker	6	6

Quarterfinals
1	(United States) Bob Lutz (United States) Stan Smith	6	6
(United States) Mike Cahill (United States) Terry Moor	3	4
3	(United States) Vitas Gerulaitis (United States) Sandy Mayer
(South Africa) Raymond Moore (Italy) Tonino Zugarelli	w/o
(United States) Tom Leonard (United States) Mike MacHette	6	3	4
4	(United States) Fred McNair (Mexico) Raúl Ramírez	3	6	6
(Chile) Jaime Fillol (Romania) Ilie Năstase	7^{7}	7^{7}
2	(Poland) Wojciech Fibak (Netherlands) Tom Okker	6^{4}	6^{5}

Semifinals
1	(United States) Bob Lutz (United States) Stan Smith	7^{9}	6
(South Africa) Raymond Moore (Italy) Tonino Zugarelli	6^{7}	3
4	(United States) Fred McNair (Mexico) Raúl Ramírez	6	6
(Chile) Jaime Fillol (Romania) Ilie Năstase	4	4

Final
1	(United States) Bob Lutz (United States) Stan Smith	2	3
4	(United States) Fred McNair (Mexico) Raúl Ramírez	6	6
