= 2008 ABN AMRO World Tennis Tournament =

- Date: 18–24 February
- Edition: 36th
- Category: ATP International Series Gold
- Draw: 32S / 16D
- Prize money: €803,000
- Surface: Hardcourt / indoor
- Location: Rotterdam, Netherlands
- Venue: Rotterdam Ahoy

Champions

Singles
- (France) Michaël Llodra

Doubles
- (Czech Republic) Tomáš Berdych / (Russia) Dmitry Tursunov
- ABN AMRO World Tennis Tournament

The 2008 ABN AMRO World Tennis Tournament was a men's tennis tournament played on indoor hard courts. It was the 36th edition of the event known that year as the ABN AMRO World Tennis Tournament, and was part of the ATP International Series Gold of the 2008 ATP Tour. It took place at the Rotterdam Ahoy indoor sporting arena in Rotterdam, Netherlands, from 18 February through 24 February 2008. Michaël Llodra won the singles title.

The field featured ATP No. 2, reigning French Open champion and recent Australian Open semifinalist Rafael Nadal, Moscow winner Nikolay Davydenko, and Tennis Masters Cup runner-up and Australian Open quarterfinalist David Ferrer. Also present competing were Chennai titlist Mikhail Youzhny, Tokyo semifinalist Tomáš Berdych, Andy Murray, Juan Carlos Ferrero and Marcos Baghdatis.

This tournament was notable in which none of the seeds reached the quarter-finals, with defending champion Youzhny, Murray, Ferrero and Baghdatis, as well as 2004 champion Lleyton Hewitt, all losing in the first round. Nadal, Davydenko, Ferrer and Berdych were the second round casualties – with Italian Andreas Seppi causing an upset by virtue of his defeat of the top-seeded Nadal, to follow on from his first round defeat of Hewitt. This was only the third ATP tournament since 2000 in which no seeds reached the quarter-finals.

== Finals ==
=== Singles ===
(France) Michaël Llodra defeated (Sweden) Robin Söderling, 6–7^{(3–7)}, 6–3, 7–6^{(7–4)}

- It was Michaël Llodra's 2nd title of the year, and his 3rd overall.

=== Doubles ===
(Czech Republic) Tomáš Berdych / (Russia) Dmitry Tursunov defeated (Germany) Philipp Kohlschreiber / (Russia) Mikhail Youzhny, 7–5, 3–6, [10–7]
