= 1980 ABN World Tennis Tournament – Singles =

Singles
- 1980 ABN World Tennis Tournament

Final
- Champion: (Switzerland) Heinz Günthardt
- Runner-up: (United States) Gene Mayer
- Score: 6–2, 6–4

Details
- Draw: 32
- Seeds: 8

Events
Singles	Doubles
- ABN World Tennis Tournament

Björn Borg was the defending champion of the singles event at the ABN World Tennis Tournament, but did not participate in this edition. Unseeded Heinz Günthardt won the title after a victory in the final against first-seeded Gene Mayer 6–2, 6–4.

== Seeds ==
1. (United States) Gene Mayer (final)
2. (United States) John Sadri (quarterfinals)
3. (United States) Stan Smith (first round)
4. (Czechoslovakia) Ivan Lendl (semifinals)
5. (United States) Tim Gullikson (first round)
6. (Italy) Adriano Panatta (second round)
7. (India) Vijay Amritraj (quarterfinals)

== Draw ==
=== Finals ===
Semifinals
1	(United States) Gene Mayer	6	6	6
(Australia) Paul McNamee	7	3	1
4	(Czechoslovakia) Ivan Lendl	6	6	3
(Switzerland) Heinz Günthardt	4	7	6

Final
1	(United States) Gene Mayer	2	4
(Switzerland) Heinz Günthardt	6	6

=== Upper half ===
First round
1	(United States) Gene Mayer	6	6
(Australia) Peter McNamara	0	1
(France) Jean-François Caujolle	2	4
(United States) Brian Teacher	6	6
WC	(Netherlands) Marc Albert	6	4	5
(United States) Chris Delaney	4	6	7
(United States) Butch Walts	6	6	4
6	(Italy) Adriano Panatta	1	7	6
3	(United States) Stan Smith	2	2
(Australia) Paul McNamee	6	6
Q	(Netherlands) Paul van Min	5	5
(France) Georges Goven	7	7
(United Kingdom) Buster Mottram	6	6
WC	(Netherlands) Eric Wilborts	3	0
(France) Bernard Fritz	4	3
7	(India) Vijay Amritraj	6	6

Second round
1	(United States) Gene Mayer	6	6
(United States) Brian Teacher	2	4
(United States) Chris Delaney	1	6	7
6	(Italy) Adriano Panatta	6	3	5
(Australia) Paul McNamee	6	6
(France) Georges Goven	4	4
(United Kingdom) Buster Mottram	7	3	3
7	(India) Vijay Amritraj	6	6	6

Quarterfinals
1	(United States) Gene Mayer	6	6
(United States) Chris Delaney	4	4
(Australia) Paul McNamee	6	6
7	(India) Vijay Amritraj	3	4

Semifinals
1	(United States) Gene Mayer	6	6	6
(Australia) Paul McNamee	7	3	1

=== Lower half ===
First round
LL	(Belgium) Bernard Boileau	6	2	6
(South Africa) Frew McMillan	3	6	3
(United States) Bill Scanlon	6	1
(Romania) Ilie Năstase	7	6
(Australia) Colin Dibley	6	4
(Australia) Terry Rocavert	1	1	r
(Italy) Gianni Ocleppo	3	4
4	(Czechoslovakia) Ivan Lendl	6	6
5	(United States) Tim Gullikson	3	4
(South Africa) Johan Kriek	6	6
(Finland) Leo Palin	5	3
(Switzerland) Heinz Günthardt	7	6
(Netherlands) Louk Sanders	6	7
(Brazil) Carlos Kirmayr	4	5
(United States) Hank Pfister	4	4
2	(United States) John Sadri	6	6

Second round
LL	(Belgium) Bernard Boileau	3	6	3
(Romania) Ilie Năstase	6	2	6
(Australia) Colin Dibley	2	1
4	(Czechoslovakia) Ivan Lendl	6	6
(South Africa) Johan Kriek	4	0
(Switzerland) Heinz Günthardt	6	6
(Netherlands) Louk Sanders	2	2
2	(United States) John Sadri	6	6

Quarterfinals
(Romania) Ilie Năstase	5	1
4	(Czechoslovakia) Ivan Lendl	7	6
(Switzerland) Heinz Günthardt	7	5	6
2	(United States) John Sadri	6	7	2

Semifinals
4	(Czechoslovakia) Ivan Lendl	6	6	3
(Switzerland) Heinz Günthardt	4	7	6
