= 2007 ABN AMRO World Tennis Tournament =

- Date: 19–25 February
- Edition: 35th
- Category: ATP International Series Gold
- Draw: 32S / 16D
- Prize money: $900,000
- Surface: Hardcourt / indoor
- Location: Rotterdam, Netherlands
- Venue: Rotterdam Ahoy

Champions

Singles
- (Russia) Mikhail Youzhny

Doubles
- (Czech Republic) Martin Damm / (India) Leander Paes
- ABN AMRO World Tennis Tournament

The 2007 ABN AMRO World Tennis Tournament was a men's tennis tournament played on indoor hard courts. It was the 35th edition of the event known that year as the ABN AMRO World Tennis Tournament, and was part of the ATP International Series Gold of the 2007 ATP Tour. It took place at the Rotterdam Ahoy indoor sporting arena in Rotterdam, Netherlands, from 19 February through 25 February 2007. Mikhail Youzhny won the singles title.

The singles field was headlined by ATP No. 3, Australian Open quarterfinalist and 2006 Paris Masters champion Nikolay Davydenko, other Australian Open quarterfinalist and Auckland runner-up Tommy Robredo, and Doha winner and Zagreb finalist Ivan Ljubičić. Other seeded players were Sydney quarterfinalist Tomáš Berdych, Adelaide champion Novak Djokovic, David Ferrer, Lleyton Hewitt and Radek Štěpánek.

== Finals ==
=== Singles ===
(Russia) Mikhail Youzhny defeated (Croatia) Ivan Ljubičić 6–2, 6–4

- It was Mikhail Youzhny's 1st title of the year, and his 3rd overall.

=== Doubles ===
(Czech Republic) Martin Damm / (India) Leander Paes defeated (Romania) Andrei Pavel / (Germany) Alexander Waske 6–3, 6–7^{(5–7)}, [10–7]
