= 1991 ABN AMRO World Tennis Tournament – Singles =

Singles
- 1991 ABN AMRO World Tennis Tournament

Final
- Champion: (Italy) Omar Camporese
- Runner-up: (Czechoslovakia) Ivan Lendl
- Score: 3–6, 7–6^{(7–4)}, 7–6^{(7–4)}

Details
- Draw: 32
- Seeds: 8

Events
Singles	Doubles
- ABN AMRO World Tennis Tournament

Brad Gilbert was the reigning champion of the singles event at the ABN World Tennis Tournament but did not participate in this edition. Unseeded Omar Camporese won the singles title after a 3–6, 7–6^{(7–4)}, 7–6^{(7–4)} win in the final against first-seeded Ivan Lendl.

== Seeds ==
1. (Czechoslovakia) Ivan Lendl (final)
2. (Austria) Thomas Muster (first round)
3. (Spain) Emilio Sánchez (second round)
4. (Croatia) Goran Ivanišević (first round)
5. (Russia) Andrei Chesnokov (second round)
6. (Sweden) Jonas Svensson (first round)
7. (Switzerland) Jakob Hlasek (quarterfinals)
8. (Czechoslovakia) Karel Nováček (quarterfinals)

== Draws ==
=== Finals ===
Semifinals
1	(Czechoslovakia) Ivan Lendl	7	6
(Sweden) Anders Järryd	5
(Netherlands) Paul Haarhuis	7	2	6
(Italy) Omar Camporese	6	6	7

Final
1	(Czechoslovakia) Ivan Lendl	6	6	6
(Italy) Omar Camporese	3	7	7

=== Upper half ===
First round
1	(Czech Republic) Ivan Lendl	6	6
(Netherlands) Tom Nijssen	3	1
(Sweden) Nicklas Kulti	6	6
(Germany) Christian Saceanu	2	4
Q	(Czech Republic) Slava Doseděl	7	5	7
(France) Henri Leconte	5	7	6^{3}
WC	(Australia) Pat Cash	2	4
7	(Switzerland) Jakob Hlasek	6	6
3	(Spain) Emilio Sánchez	6	6
Q	(Belgium) Libor Pimek	3	3
(Israel) Amos Mansdorf	4	2
(Sweden) Anders Järryd	6	6
(Netherlands) Mark Koevermans	6	4	2
(Netherlands) Jan Siemerink	3	6	6
WC	(Netherlands) Richard Krajicek	4	3
5	(Russia) Andrei Chesnokov	6	6

Second round
1	(Czech Republic) Ivan Lendl	6	6
(Sweden) Nicklas Kulti	4	0
Q	(Czech Republic) Slava Doseděl	3	4
7	(Switzerland) Jakob Hlasek	6	6
3	(Spain) Emilio Sánchez	2	2
(Sweden) Anders Järryd	6	6
(Netherlands) Jan Siemerink	4	6	6
5	(Russia) Andrei Chesnokov	6	3	2

Quarterfinals
1	(Czech Republic) Ivan Lendl	3	6	7
7	(Switzerland) Jakob Hlasek	6	3	5
(Sweden) Anders Järryd	7	6
(Netherlands) Jan Siemerink	6^{5}	2

Semifinals
1	(Czech Republic) Ivan Lendl	7	6
(Sweden) Anders Järryd	5	4

=== Lower half ===
First round
6	(Sweden) Jonas Svensson	5	6	3
(Netherlands) Paul Haarhuis	7	0	6
(Spain) Jordi Arrese	1	0	r
(Sweden) Magnus Gustafsson	6	3
(Sweden) Magnus Larsson	6	4	6
WC	(Netherlands) Michiel Schapers	4	6	4
(Sweden) Christian Bergström	7	7
4	(Croatia) Goran Ivanišević	6^{3}	6^{4}
8	(Czech Republic) Karel Nováček	6	6
(Haiti) Ronald Agénor	3	1
(Spain) Javier Sánchez	6	6
(Australia) Todd Woodbridge	1	4
(Germany) Eric Jelen	2	6	2
(Italy) Omar Camporese	6	2	6
(Austria) Alex Antonitsch	2	7	6
2	(Austria) Thomas Muster	6	5	2

Second round
(Netherlands) Paul Haarhuis	6	3	6
(Sweden) Magnus Gustafsson	3	6	1
(Sweden) Magnus Larsson	2	5
(Sweden) Christian Bergström	6	7
8	(Czech Republic) Karel Nováček	6^{4}	6	6
(Spain) Javier Sánchez	7	3	3
(Italy) Omar Camporese	6	6
(Austria) Alex Antonitsch	3	4

Quarterfinals
(Netherlands) Paul Haarhuis	7	6
(Sweden) Christian Bergström	5	3
8	(Czech Republic) Karel Nováček	4	5
(Italy) Omar Camporese	6	7

Semifinals
(Netherlands) Paul Haarhuis	7	2	6^{2}
(Italy) Omar Camporese	6^{5}	6	7
