= 1982 ABN World Tennis Tournament – Singles =

Singles
- 1982 ABN World Tennis Tournament

Final
- Champion: (Argentina) Guillermo Vilas
- Runner-up: (United States) Jimmy Connors
- Score: 0–6, 6–2, 6–4

Details
- Draw: 32
- Seeds: 8

Events
Singles	Doubles
- ABN World Tennis Tournament

First-seeded Jimmy Connors was the defending champion of the singles event at the ABN World Tennis Tournament, but lost in the final against second-seeded Guillermo Vilas 0–6, 6–2, 6–4.

== Seeds ==
1. (United States) Jimmy Connors (final)
2. (Argentina) Guillermo Vilas (champion)
3. (United States) Gene Mayer (second round)
4. (United States) Brian Teacher (second round)
5. (United States) Brian Gottfried (semifinals)
6. (Australia) Mark Edmondson (first round)
7. (United States) Mel Purcell (second round)
8. (Czechoslovakia) Tomáš Šmíd (quarterfinals)

== Draw ==
=== Finals ===
Semifinals
1	(United States) Jimmy Connors	6	6
5	(United States) Brian Gottfried	4	1
(United Kingdom) Buster Mottram	4	4
2	(Argentina) Guillermo Vilas	6	6

Final
1	(United States) Jimmy Connors	6	2	4
2	(Argentina) Guillermo Vilas	0	6	6

=== Upper half ===
First round
1	(United States) Jimmy Connors	6	6
(United States) Kevin Curren	1	2
(United States) Vincent Van Patten	5	6	6
(West Germany) Peter Elter	7	3	4
Q	(Sweden) Stefan Simonsson	5	3
(Czechoslovakia) Stanislav Birner	7	6
(Sweden) Joakim Nyström	1	1
8	(Czechoslovakia) Tomáš Šmíd	6	6
3	(United States) Gene Mayer	6	6
Q	(United Kingdom) John Lloyd	4	1
(United States) John Sadri	6	6
(Sweden) Mats Wilander	2	3
(United States) Harold Solomon	6	2	1
(United States) Fritz Buehning	4	6	6
(United States) Bill Scanlon	4	7	6
5	(United States) Brian Gottfried	6	6	7

Second round
1	(United States) Jimmy Connors	7	6
(United States) Vincent Van Patten	5	2
(Czechoslovakia) Stanislav Birner	2	1
8	(Czechoslovakia) Tomáš Šmíd	6	6
3	(United States) Gene Mayer	2	0	r
(United States) John Sadri	6	1
(United States) Harold Solomon	2	1
5	(United States) Brian Gottfried	6	6

Quarterfinals
1	(United States) Jimmy Connors	7	6
8	(Czechoslovakia) Tomáš Šmíd	6	3
(United States) John Sadri	7	3	2
5	(United States) Brian Gottfried	5	6	6

Semifinals
1	(United States) Jimmy Connors	6	6
5	(United States) Brian Gottfried	4	1

=== Lower half ===
First round
7	(United States) Mel Purcell	7	6
(United States) Junie Chatman	6	4
(United States) Chip Hooper	3	6	7
(United States) Tim Gullikson	6	3	5
(United Kingdom) Buster Mottram	7	6
(Netherlands) Eric Wilborts	5	0
Q	(Australia) Brad Drewett	4	7	4
4	(United States) Brian Teacher	6	5	6
6	(Australia) Mark Edmondson	6	4
(Czechoslovakia) Pavel Složil	7	6
(Australia) Rod Frawley	0	1
(Australia) John Alexander	6	6
(United States) Tim Wilkison	7	7
(Israel) Shlomo Glickstein	6	6
(United States) John Austin	2	1
2	(Argentina) Guillermo Vilas	6	6

Second round
7	(United States) Mel Purcell	4	3
(United States) Chip Hooper	6	6
(United Kingdom) Buster Mottram	6	3	7
4	(United States) Brian Teacher	4	6	5
(Czechoslovakia) Pavel Složil	4	6	6
(Australia) John Alexander	6	0	3
(United States) Tim Wilkison	2	3
2	(Argentina) Guillermo Vilas	6	6

Quarterfinals
(United States) Chip Hooper	4	1
(United Kingdom) Buster Mottram	6	6
(Czechoslovakia) Pavel Složil	2	0
2	(Argentina) Guillermo Vilas	6	6

Semifinals
(United Kingdom) Buster Mottram	4	4
2	(Argentina) Guillermo Vilas	6	6
