= 2019 ABN AMRO World Tennis Tournament =

- Date: 11–17 February
- Edition: 46th
- Category: ATP Tour 500 series
- Draw: 32S / 16D
- Prize money: €1,961,160
- Surface: Hard / indoor
- Location: Rotterdam, Netherlands
- Venue: Rotterdam Ahoy

Champions

Singles
- (France) Gaël Monfils

Doubles
- (France) Jérémy Chardy / (Finland) Henri Kontinen

Wheelchair singles
- (France) Stéphane Houdet

Wheelchair doubles
- (France) Stéphane Houdet / (France) Nicolas Peifer
- Rotterdam Open

The 2019 ABN AMRO World Tennis Tournament (or Rotterdam Open) was a men's tennis tournament played on indoor hard courts. It took place at the Rotterdam Ahoy arena in the Dutch city of Rotterdam, between 11 and 17 February 2019. It was the 46th edition of the Rotterdam Open, and part of the ATP Tour 500 series of the 2019 ATP Tour. The tournament also included a Men's Wheelchair Tennis Singles and Doubles draw, which was an ITF-1 level tournament, with a total of $32,000 prize money.

== Finals ==
=== Singles ===
- (France) Gaël Monfils defeated (Switzerland) Stan Wawrinka, 6–3, 1–6, 6–2

=== Doubles ===
- (France) Jérémy Chardy / (Finland) Henri Kontinen defeated (Netherlands) Jean-Julien Rojer / (Romania) Horia Tecău, 7–6^{(7–5)}, 7–6^{(7–4)}

== Singles main-draw entrants ==
=== Seeds ===
Country	Player	Ranking^{1}	Seed
JPN	Kei Nishikori	7	1
RUS	Karen Khachanov	11	2
GRE	Stefanos Tsitsipas	12	3
CAN	Milos Raonic	14	4
RUS	Daniil Medvedev	16	5
~~FRA~~	~~Lucas Pouille~~	~~17~~	~~6~~
~~ESP~~	~~Roberto Bautista Agut~~	~~18~~	~~7~~
BEL	David Goffin	21	8
GEO	Nikoloz Basilashvili	22	9
CAN	Denis Shapovalov	25	10

- ^{1} Rankings as of 4 February 2019.

=== Other entrants ===
The following players received wildcards into the main draw:

- (Czech Republic) Tomáš Berdych
- (Netherlands) Tallon Griekspoor
- (Switzerland) Stan Wawrinka

The following player received entry into the singles main draw using a protected ranking:

- (France) Jo-Wilfried Tsonga

The following player received entry as a special exempt:

- (France) Pierre-Hugues Herbert

The following players received entry from the qualifying draw:

- (Italy) Thomas Fabbiano
- (Germany) Peter Gojowczyk
- (France) Gilles Simon
- (Croatia) Franko Škugor

The following players received entry as lucky losers:

- (Romania) Marius Copil
- (Latvia) Ernests Gulbis

=== Withdrawals ===
Before the tournament

- (Spain) Roberto Bautista Agut → replaced by (Romania) Marius Copil
- (Croatia) Marin Čilić → replaced by (Kazakhstan) Mikhail Kukushkin
- (Bulgaria) Grigor Dimitrov → replaced by (Slovakia) Martin Kližan
- (United Kingdom) Kyle Edmund → replaced by (France) Jérémy Chardy
- (France) Richard Gasquet → replaced by (Australia) Matthew Ebden
- (Australia) Nick Kyrgios → replaced by (Netherlands) Robin Haase
- (France) Lucas Pouille → replaced by (Latvia) Ernests Gulbis
- (Germany) Alexander Zverev → replaced by (Bosnia and Herzegovina) Damir Džumhur

== Doubles main-draw entrants ==
=== Seeds ===
Country	Player	Country	Player	Rank^{1}	Seed
AUT	Oliver Marach	CRO	Mate Pavić	15	1
POL	Łukasz Kubot	BRA	Marcelo Melo	21	2
RSA	Raven Klaasen	NZL	Michael Venus	26	3
ESP	Marcel Granollers	CRO	Nikola Mektić	43	4

- ^{1} Rankings as of February 4, 2019.

=== Other entrants ===
The following pairs received wildcards into the doubles main draw:

- (Netherlands) Robin Haase / (Netherlands) Matwé Middelkoop
- (Netherlands) Wesley Koolhof / (Austria) Jürgen Melzer

The following pair received entry from the qualifying draw:

- (Netherlands) Sander Arends / (Netherlands) David Pel

The following pairs received entry as lucky losers:

- (Georgia (country)) Nikoloz Basilashvili / (Australia) Matthew Ebden
- (United States) Austin Krajicek / (New Zealand) Artem Sitak

=== Withdrawals ===
Before the tournament

- (Russia) Karen Khachanov
- (France) Lucas Pouille

During the tournament

- (Germany) Philipp Kohlschreiber
