= 1978 ABN World Tennis Tournament – Singles =

Singles
- 1978 ABN World Tennis Tournament

Final
- Champion: (United States) Jimmy Connors
- Runner-up: (Mexico) Raúl Ramírez
- Score: 7–5, 7–5

Details
- Draw: 32
- Seeds: 8

Events
Singles	Doubles
- Rotterdam Open

The 1978 ABN World Tennis Tournament – Singles was an event of the 1978 ABN World Tennis Tournament tennis tournament and was played on indoor carpet courts at Rotterdam Ahoy in the Netherlands, between 3 April and 9 April 1978. The draw comprised 32 players and eight of them were seeded. Sixth-seeded Dick Stockton was the defending Rotterdam Open singles champion but lost in the quarterfinals to first-seeded Jimmy Connors who won the singles title after a win in the final against fourth-seeded Raúl Ramírez, 7–5, 7–5.

== Seeds ==
1. (United States) Jimmy Connors (champion)
2. (Sweden) Björn Borg (quarterfinals)
3. (United States) Vitas Gerulaitis (semifinals)
4. (Mexico) Raúl Ramírez (final)
5. (United States) Sandy Mayer (second round)
6. (United States) Dick Stockton (quarterfinals)
7. (Romania) Ilie Năstase (semifinals)
8. (Poland) Wojtek Fibak (first round)

== Draw ==
=== Finals ===
Semifinals
1	(United States) Jimmy Connors	4	6	6
3	(United States) Vitas Gerulaitis	6	4	4
4	(Mexico) Raúl Ramírez	7	6
7	(Romania) Ilie Năstase	5	3

Final
1	(United States) Jimmy Connors	7	7
4	(Mexico) Raúl Ramírez	5	5

=== Upper half ===
First round
1	(United States) Jimmy Connors	6	6
(Australia) Dick Crealy	1	3
(Sweden) Ove Nils Bengtson	7	6	1
(Sweden) Kjell Johansson	6	7	6
(United States) Fred McNair	3	4
(United Kingdom) John Lloyd	6	6
(United States) Bill Scanlon	3	1
6	(United States) Dick Stockton	6	6
3	(United States) Vitas Gerulaitis	6	6
(United States) Stan Smith	2	4
(New Zealand) Chris Lewis	5	6	6
(Chile) Jaime Fillol	7	0	7
(Australia) Ken Rosewall	6^{3}	2
(Czechoslovakia) Vladimír Zedník	7	6
(United States) Robert Lutz	6	6
8	(Poland) Wojtek Fibak	4	2

Second round
1	(United States) Jimmy Connors	6	6
(Sweden) Kjell Johansson	3	1
(United Kingdom) John Lloyd	0	3
4	(United States) Dick Stockton	6	6
3	(United States) Vitas Gerulaitis	6	6
(Chile) Jaime Fillol	0	1
(Czechoslovakia) Vladimír Zedník	3	6	4
(United States) Robert Lutz	6	3	6

Quarterfinals
1	(United States) Jimmy Connors	3	6	6
4	(United States) Dick Stockton	6	4	0
3	(United States) Vitas Gerulaitis	6	6
(United States) Robert Lutz	2	3

Semifinals
1	(United States) Jimmy Connors	4	6	6
3	(United States) Vitas Gerulaitis	6	4	4

=== Lower half ===
First round
5	(United States) Sandy Mayer	6	7	6
(United States) Tom Leonard	7	6	2
(South Africa) Raymond Moore	6	7	3
(Australia) Kim Warwick	7	6	6
(India) Vijay Amritraj	6	6
(Netherlands) Tom Okker	2	3
(Czechoslovakia) Tomáš Šmíd	2	6^{6}
4	(Mexico) Raúl Ramírez	6	7
7	(Romania) Ilie Năstase	6	6
(United States) Sherwood Stewart	1	1
(United States) Terry Moor	5	5
(United States) Mike Fishbach	7	7
(United Kingdom) Mark Cox	1	4
(Italy) Antonio Zugarelli	6	6
(Netherlands) Louk Sanders	2	3
2	(Sweden) Björn Borg	6	6

Second round
5	(United States) Sandy Mayer	3	3
(Australia) Kim Warwick	6	6
(India) Vijay Amritraj	2	2
4	(Mexico) Raúl Ramírez	6	6
7	(Romania) Ilie Năstase	6	6
(United States) Mike Fishbach	3	1
(Italy) Antonio Zugarelli	1	2
2	(Sweden) Björn Borg	6	6

Quarterfinals
(Australia) Kim Warwick	2	2
4	(Mexico) Raúl Ramírez	6	6
7	(Romania) Ilie Năstase	w/o
2	(Sweden) Björn Borg

Semifinals
4	(Mexico) Raúl Ramírez	7	6
7	(Romania) Ilie Năstase	5	3
