= 1982 ABN World Tennis Tournament =

- Date: 15 – 21 March
- Edition: 10th
- Category: Grand Prix circuit
- Draw: 32S / 16D
- Prize money: $250,000
- Surface: Carpet / indoor
- Location: Rotterdam, Netherlands
- Venue: Rotterdam Ahoy

Champions

Singles
- (Argentina) Guillermo Vilas

Doubles
- (Australia) Mark Edmondson / (United States) Sherwood Stewart
- ABN World Tennis Tournament

The 1982 ABN World Tennis Tournament was a tennis tournament played on indoor carpet courts at the Rotterdam Ahoy in the Netherlands. It was part of the 1982 Volvo Grand Prix circuit. It was the 10th edition of the tournament and was held from 15 March through 21 March 1982. Second-seeded Guillermo Vilas won the singles title.

== Finals ==
=== Singles ===
(Argentina) Guillermo Vilas defeated (United States) Jimmy Connors 0–6, 6–2, 6–4

=== Doubles ===
(Australia) Mark Edmondson / (United States) Sherwood Stewart defeated (United States) Fritz Buehning / (South Africa) Kevin Curren 7–5, 6–2
