= 1995 ABN AMRO World Tennis Tournament – Singles =

Singles
- 1995 ABN AMRO World Tennis Tournament

Final
- Champion: (Netherlands) Richard Krajicek
- Runner-up: (Netherlands) Paul Haarhuis
- Score: 7–6^{(7–5)}, 6–4

Details
- Draw: 32
- Seeds: 8

Events
Singles	Doubles
- ABN AMRO World Tennis Tournament

Michael Stich was the defending champion, but chose not to participate that year.

Richard Krajicek won in the final 7–6^{(7–5)}, 6–4, against Paul Haarhuis.

== Seeds ==
1. (withdrew)
2. (Russia) Yevgeny Kafelnikov (semifinals)
3. (South Africa) Wayne Ferreira (second round)
4. (Ukraine) Andrei Medvedev (quarterfinals)
5. (Netherlands) Richard Krajicek (champion)
6. (Netherlands) Jacco Eltingh (first round)
7. (Czech Republic) Slava Doseděl (second round)
8. (Czech Republic) Karel Nováček (first round)

== Draw ==
Key

- Q = Qualifier
- WC = Wild card
- LL = Lucky loser
- Alt = Alternate
- ITF = ITF entry
- PR = Protected ranking
- SR = Special ranking
- SE = Special exempt
- JE = Junior exempt
- JR = Junior Accelerator Programme entrant
- CO = College Accelerator Programme entrant
- NG = Next Gen Accelerator Program entrant
- w/o = Walkover
- r = Retired
- d = Defaulted

=== Finals ===
Semifinals
Q	(Italy) Omar Camporese	3	5
5/WC	(Netherlands) Richard Krajicek	6	7
(Netherlands) Paul Haarhuis	3	6	7
2	(Russia) Yevgeny Kafelnikov	6	3	6^{5}

Final
5/WC	(Netherlands) Richard Krajicek	7	6
(Netherlands) Paul Haarhuis	6^{5}	4

=== Top half ===
First round
LL	(Netherlands) S Schalken	6	6^{2}	6
(Slovakia) K Kučera	4	7	3
Q	(Netherlands) S Groen	3	1
WC	(Netherlands) J Winnink	6	6
Q	(Italy) O Camporese	6	7
(Germany) J Renzenbrink	4	6^{2}
(Russia) A Volkov	6^{4}	6	6
8	(Czech Republic) K Nováček	7	4	2
4	(Ukraine) A Medvedev	6	6
(Spain) T Carbonell	4	4
Q	(Russia) A Olhovskiy	6	6
(United Kingdom) J Bates	3	4
(Germany) C-U Steeb	5	3
(Netherlands) J Siemerink	7	6
(Haiti) R Agénor	1	4
5/WC	(Netherlands) R Krajicek	6	6

Second round
LL	(Netherlands) S Schalken	6	6
WC	(Netherlands) J Winnink	2	2
Q	(Italy) O Camporese	6	6
(Russia) A Volkov	2	3
4	(Ukraine) A Medvedev	6	7
Q	(Russia) A Olhovskiy	4	5
(Netherlands) J Siemerink	5	4
5/WC	(Netherlands) R Krajicek	7	6

Quarterfinals
LL	(Netherlands) S Schalken	2	3
Q	(Italy) O Camporese	6	6
4	(Ukraine) A Medvedev	6^{5}	4
5/WC	(Netherlands) R Krajicek	7	6

Semifinals
Q	(Italy) O Camporese	3	5
5/WC	(Netherlands) R Krajicek	6	7

=== Bottom half ===
First round
6	(Netherlands) J Eltingh	6^{4}	6^{3}
SE	(Denmark) K Carlsen	7	7
(Netherlands) P Haarhuis	3	6	6
(Italy) C Caratti	6	4	1
(United States) P McEnroe	2	7	2
(United States) J Tarango	6	6^{4}	6
(Brazil) L Mattar	4	3
3	(South Africa) W Ferreira	6	6
7	(Czech Republic) S Doseděl	6	6
(Norway) C Ruud	4	1
(Czech Republic) M Damm	6	6^{5}	7
(Switzerland) J Hlasek	2	7	6^{2}
WC	(Sweden) M Wilander	6	6
(Czech Republic) D Vacek	4	4
Q	(United Kingdom) D Sapsford	1	6^{3}
2	(Russia) Y Kafelnikov	6	7

Second round
SE	(Denmark) K Carlsen	7	6^{5}	6^{4}
(Netherlands) P Haarhuis	6^{8}	7	7
(United States) J Tarango	6	6
3	(South Africa) W Ferreira	3	2
7	(Czech Republic) S Doseděl	6	5	5
(Czech Republic) M Damm	3	7	7
WC	(Sweden) M Wilander	4	6^{3}
2	(Russia) Y Kafelnikov	6	7

Quarterfinals
(Netherlands) P Haarhuis	6	6
(United States) J Tarango	4	4
(Czech Republic) M Damm	0	6^{6}
2	(Russia) Y Kafelnikov	6	7

Semifinals
(Netherlands) P Haarhuis	3	6	7
2	(Russia) Y Kafelnikov	6	3	6^{5}
