= 1995 ABN AMRO World Tennis Tournament – Doubles =

Doubles
- 1995 ABN AMRO World Tennis Tournament

Final
- Champions: (Czech Republic) Martin Damm (Sweden) Anders Järryd
- Runners-up: (Spain) Tomás Carbonell (Spain) Francisco Roig
- Score: 6–3, 6–2

Details
- Draw: 16
- Seeds: 4

Events
Singles	Doubles
- ABN AMRO World Tennis Tournament

Jeremy Bates and Jonas Björkman were the defending champions, but chose not to participate that year.

Martin Damm and Anders Järryd won in the final 6–3, 6–2, against Tomás Carbonell and Francisco Roig.

== Seeds ==
1. (Netherlands) Jacco Eltingh / (Netherlands) Paul Haarhuis (semifinals)
2. (South Africa) John-Laffnie de Jager / (Russia) Andrei Olhovskiy (semifinals)
3. (Czech Republic) Martin Damm / (Sweden) Anders Järryd (champions)
4. (Switzerland) Jakob Hlasek / (Russia) Yevgeny Kafelnikov (first round)

== Draw ==
Key

- Q = Qualifier
- WC = Wild card
- LL = Lucky loser
- Alt = Alternate
- ITF = ITF entry
- PR = Protected ranking
- SR = Special ranking
- SE = Special exempt
- JE = Junior exempt
- JR = Junior Accelerator Programme entrant
- CO = College Accelerator Programme entrant
- NG = Next Gen Accelerator Program entrant
- w/o = Walkover
- r = Retired
- d = Defaulted

=== Draw ===
First round
1	(Netherlands) J Eltingh (Netherlands) P Haarhuis	6	6
(Italy) C Brandi (Belgium) L Pimek	3	3
WC	(Denmark) K Carlsen (United States) P McEnroe	6	4	1
(United States) M Keil (Sweden) P Nyborg	4	6	6
3	(Czech Republic) M Damm (Sweden) A Järryd	6	7
(Austria) A Antonitsch (West Germany) U Riglewski	3	6
WC	(Netherlands) R Krajicek (Ukraine) A Medvedev	6	7
(Netherlands) T Nijssen (Netherlands) M Oosting	4	6
Q	(Italy) O Camporese (France) S Simian	4	2
(Spain) T Carbonell (Spain) F Roig	6	6
WC	(Czech Republic) K Nováček (Sweden) M Wilander	5	7	6
4	(Switzerland) J Hlasek (Russia) Y Kafelnikov	7	6	4
(Netherlands) HJ Davids (Netherlands) J Siemerink	6	3	3
(Czech Republic) C Suk (Czech Republic) D Vacek	4	6	6
(South Africa) G Muller (South Africa) P Norval	7	4	3
2	(South Africa) J-L de Jager (Russia) A Olhovskiy	5	6	6

Quarterfinals
1	(Netherlands) J Eltingh (Netherlands) P Haarhuis	4	7	7
(United States) M Keil (Sweden) P Nyborg	6	6	6
3	(Czech Republic) M Damm (Sweden) A Järryd	w/o
(Netherlands) R Krajicek (Ukraine) A Medvedev
(Spain) T Carbonell (Spain) F Roig	6	6	6
WC	(Czech Republic) K Nováček (Sweden) M Wilander	7	4	4
(Czech Republic) C Suk (Czech Republic) D Vacek	4	5
2	(South Africa) J-L de Jager (Russia) A Olhovskiy	6	7

Semifinals
1	(Netherlands) J Eltingh (Netherlands) P Haarhuis	2	6	1
3	(Czech Republic) M Damm (Sweden) A Järryd	6	3	6
(Spain) T Carbonell (Spain) F Roig	6	6
2	(South Africa) J-L de Jager (Russia) A Olhovskiy	2	4

Final
3	(Czech Republic) M Damm (Sweden) A Järryd	6	6
(Spain) T Carbonell (Spain) F Roig	3	2
