= 1994 ABN AMRO World Tennis Tournament – Singles =

Singles
- 1994 ABN AMRO World Tennis Tournament

Final
- Champion: (Germany) Michael Stich
- Runner-up: (South Africa) Wayne Ferreira
- Score: 4–6, 6–3, 6–0

Details
- Draw: 32
- Seeds: 8

Events
Singles	Doubles
- ABN AMRO World Tennis Tournament

Anders Järryd was the defending champion, but lost in the first round to Kenneth Carlsen.

Michael Stich won in the final 4–6, 6–3, 6–0, against Wayne Ferreira.

John McEnroe received a wildcard after not playing on tour since 1992. He lost in the first round. This was the last singles match and tournament of his ATP Tour career.

== Seeds ==
1. (Germany) Michael Stich (champion)
2. (Croatia) Goran Ivanišević (semifinals)
3. (Sweden) Magnus Gustafsson (second round)
4. (Germany) Boris Becker (first round)
5. (South Africa) Wayne Ferreira (final)
6. (Russia) Alexander Volkov (quarterfinals)
7. (Czech Republic) Karel Nováček (second round)
8. (Sweden) Jonas Svensson (quarterfinals)

== Draw ==
Key

- Q = Qualifier
- WC = Wild card
- LL = Lucky loser
- Alt = Alternate
- ITF = ITF entry
- PR = Protected ranking
- SR = Special ranking
- SE = Special exempt
- JE = Junior exempt
- JR = Junior Accelerator Programme entrant
- CO = College Accelerator Programme entrant
- NG = Next Gen Accelerator Program entrant
- w/o = Walkover
- r = Retired
- d = Defaulted

=== Finals ===
Semifinals
1	(Germany) Michael Stich	6	6
(Netherlands) Paul Haarhuis	4	3
5	(South Africa) Wayne Ferreira	6	3	7
2	(Croatia) Goran Ivanišević	2	6	5

Final
1	(Germany) Michael Stich	4	6	6
5	(South Africa) Wayne Ferreira	6	3	0

=== Top half ===
First round
1	(Germany) M Stich	6	6
(Netherlands) J Eltingh	4	4
Q	(Czech Republic) D Vacek	7	4	6
(Russia) A Olhovskiy	6^{7}	6	4
(Morocco) Y El Aynaoui	6^{5}	4
(France) R Gilbert	7	6
Q	(Austria) A Antonitsch	4	5
7	(Czech Republic) K Nováček	6	7
4	(Germany) B Becker	6	6^{5}	4
(Netherlands) P Haarhuis	4	7	6
(Netherlands) J Siemerink	5	6	3
(Haiti) R Agénor	7	3	6
(France) G Raoux	6	6
(Sweden) H Holm	4	2
WC	(Italy) D Nargiso	6	4	4
6	(Russia) A Volkov	3	6	6

Second round
1	(Germany) M Stich	3	6	6
Q	(Czech Republic) D Vacek	6	3	4
(France) R Gilbert	4	7	6
7	(Czech Republic) K Nováček	6	6^{2}	4
(Netherlands) P Haarhuis	6	6
(Haiti) R Agénor	1	4
(France) G Raoux	4	7	6^{9}
6	(Russia) A Volkov	6	6^{6}	7

Quarterfinals
1	(Germany) M Stich	7	6
(France) R Gilbert	5	3
(Netherlands) P Haarhuis	7	6
6	(Russia) A Volkov	5	4

Semifinals
1	(Germany) M Stich	6	6
(Netherlands) P Haarhuis	4	3

=== Bottom half ===
First round
5	(South Africa) W Ferreira	6^{3}	6	7
(Czech Republic) M Damm	7	1	5
(Switzerland) J Hlasek	7	7
Q	(Netherlands) J Winnink	6^{1}	6^{5}
(New Zealand) B Steven	5	2
(Russia) Y Kafelnikov	7	6
WC	(United States) J McEnroe	2	6^{5}
3	(Sweden) M Gustafsson	6	7
8	(Sweden) J Svensson	7	4	6
(Sweden) T Enqvist	5	6	1
WC	(Italy) O Camporese	1	6^{5}
Q	(Sweden) J Björkman	6	7
(Sweden) A Järryd	6	5	3
(Denmark) K Carlsen	3	7	6
(Germany) D Prinosil	6	3	6^{3}
2	(Croatia) G Ivanišević	3	6	7

Second round
5	(South Africa) W Ferreira	6	7
(Switzerland) J Hlasek	4	6^{5}
(Russia) Y Kafelnikov	6	6
3	(Sweden) M Gustafsson	1	3
8	(Sweden) J Svensson	5	6	6
Q	(Sweden) J Björkman	7	3	4
(Denmark) K Carlsen	1	2
2	(Croatia) G Ivanišević	6	6

Quarterfinals
5	(South Africa) W Ferreira	6	3	6
(Russia) Y Kafelnikov	4	6	4
8	(Sweden) J Svensson	2	4
2	(Croatia) G Ivanišević	6	6

Semifinals
5	(South Africa) W Ferreira	6	3	7
2	(Croatia) G Ivanišević	2	6	5
