= 2019 ABN AMRO World Tennis Tournament – Singles =

Singles
- 2019 ABN AMRO World Tennis Tournament

Final
- Champion: (France) Gaël Monfils
- Runner-up: (Switzerland) Stan Wawrinka
- Score: 6–3, 1–6, 6–2

Details
- Draw: 32 (4 Q / 3 WC )
- Seeds: 8

Events
Singles	Doubles
- ABN AMRO World Tennis Tournament

Roger Federer was the defending champion, but chose not to participate this year.

Gaël Monfils won the title, defeating Stan Wawrinka in the final, 6–3, 1–6, 6–2. This was Wawrinka's first final in any ATP Tour event since the 2017 French Open.

== Seeds ==
1. (Japan) Kei Nishikori (semifinals)
2. (Russia) Karen Khachanov (first round)
3. (Greece) Stefanos Tsitsipas (first round)
4. (Canada) Milos Raonic (second round)
5. (Russia) Daniil Medvedev (semifinals)
6. (France) Lucas Pouille (withdrew)
7. (Spain) Roberto Bautista Agut (withdrew)
8. (Belgium) David Goffin (first round)
9. (Georgia (country)) Nikoloz Basilashvili (second round)
10. (Canada) Denis Shapovalov (quarterfinals)

== Draw ==
Key

- Q = Qualifier
- WC = Wild card
- LL = Lucky loser
- Alt = Alternate
- ITF = ITF entry
- PR = Protected ranking
- SR = Special ranking
- SE = Special exempt
- JE = Junior exempt
- JR = Junior Accelerator Programme entrant
- CO = College Accelerator Programme entrant
- NG = Next Gen Accelerator Program entrant
- w/o = Walkover
- r = Retired
- d = Defaulted

=== Finals ===
Semifinals
1	(Japan) Kei Nishikori	2	6	4
WC	(Switzerland) Stan Wawrinka	6	4	6
(France) Gaël Monfils	4	6	6
5	(Russia) Daniil Medvedev	6	3	4

Final
WC	(Switzerland) Stan Wawrinka	3	6	2
(France) Gaël Monfils	6	1	6

=== Top half ===
First round
1	(Japan) K Nishikori	3	6	6
SE	(France) P-H Herbert	6	1	4
LL	(Romania) M Copil	2	4
LL	(Latvia) E Gulbis	6	6
(Slovakia) M Kližan	6^{4}	4
(Hungary) M Fucsovics	7^{7}	6
(South Korea) H Chung	6	6^{1}	2
9	(Georgia (country)) N Basilashvili	4	7^{7}	6
4	(Canada) M Raonic	7^{10}	7
(Germany) P Kohlschreiber	6^{8}	5
(France) B Paire	6^{4}	1
WC	(Switzerland) S Wawrinka	7^{7}	6
Q	(France) G Simon	6^{8}	4
WC	(Czech Republic) T Berdych	7^{10}	6
Q	(Croatia) F Škugor	5	3
10	(Canada) D Shapovalov	7	6

Second round
1	(Japan) K Nishikori	6	6
LL	(Latvia) E Gulbis	1	4
(Hungary) M Fucsovics	7^{7}	6
9	(Georgia (country)) N Basilashvili	6^{1}	1
4	(Canada) M Raonic	4	6^{4}
WC	(Switzerland) S Wawrinka	6	7^{7}
WC	(Czech Republic) T Berdych	4	3
10	(Canada) D Shapovalov	6	6

Quarterfinals
1	(Japan) K Nishikori	6	6
(Hungary) M Fucsovics	3	2
WC	(Switzerland) S Wawrinka	6	7^{7}
10	(Canada) D Shapovalov	4	6^{4}

Semifinals
1	(Japan) K Nishikori	2	6	4
WC	(Switzerland) S Wawrinka	6	4	6

=== Bottom half ===
First round
8	(Belgium) D Goffin	6^{5}	5
(France) G Monfils	7^{7}	7
(Italy) A Seppi	7^{7}	3	6
Q	(Germany) P Gojowczyk	6^{3}	6	2
(Kazakhstan) M Kukushkin	6	7^{7}
(Netherlands) R Haase	2	6^{4}
(Bosnia and Herzegovina) D Džumhur	6	1	7
3	(Greece) S Tsitsipas	4	6	5
5	(Russia) D Medvedev	7^{7}	6
(France) J Chardy	6^{2}	2
(Australia) M Ebden	5	4
(Spain) F Verdasco	7	6
PR	(France) J-W Tsonga	6	6
Q	(Italy) T Fabbiano	1	4
WC	(Netherlands) T Griekspoor	3	6	6
2	(Russia) K Khachanov	6	3	2

Second round
(France) G Monfils	4	6	6
(Italy) A Seppi	6	1	3
(Kazakhstan) M Kukushkin	4	6^{3}
(Bosnia and Herzegovina) D Džumhur	6	7^{7}
5	(Russia) D Medvedev	6	7
(Spain) F Verdasco	2	5
PR	(France) J-W Tsonga	7^{7}	6
WC	(Netherlands) T Griekspoor	6^{5}	1

Quarterfinals
(France) G Monfils	6	6
(Bosnia and Herzegovina) D Džumhur	1	2
5	(Russia) D Medvedev	6	6
PR	(France) J-W Tsonga	4	2

Semifinals
(France) G Monfils	4	6	6
5	(Russia) D Medvedev	6	3	4

== Qualifying ==
=== Seeds ===
1. (France) Gilles Simon (qualified)
2. (Germany) Jan-Lennard Struff (first round)
3. (Romania) Marius Copil (qualifying competition, lucky loser)
4. (Germany) Peter Gojowczyk (qualified)
5. (United States) Denis Kudla (first round)
6. (Belarus) Ilya Ivashka (first round)
7. (Latvia) Ernests Gulbis (qualifying competition, lucky loser)
8. (Italy) Thomas Fabbiano (qualified)

=== Qualifiers ===
1. (France) Gilles Simon
2. (Croatia) Franko Škugor
3. (Italy) Thomas Fabbiano
4. (Germany) Peter Gojowczyk

=== Lucky losers ===
1. (Romania) Marius Copil
2. (Latvia) Ernests Gulbis

=== Qualifying draw ===
==== First qualifier ====
First round				Qualifying competition
				1	(France) Gilles Simon	7^{7}	7^{7}
				7	(Latvia) Ernests Gulbis	6^{2}	6^{2}
	(Ukraine) Sergiy Stakhovsky	3	4	7	(Latvia) Ernests Gulbis	6^{2}	6^{2}
7	(Latvia) Ernests Gulbis	6	6

==== Second qualifier ====
First round
2	(Germany) Jan-Lennard Struff	4	4
WC	(Netherlands) Ryan Nijboer	6	6
Alt	(Croatia) Franko Škugor	7^{7}	6
6	(Belarus) Ilya Ivashka	6^{4}	0

Qualifying competition
WC	(Netherlands) Ryan Nijboer	6	2	4
Alt	(Croatia) Franko Škugor	4	6	6

==== Third qualifier ====
First round
3	(Romania) Marius Copil	6^{3}	7^{7}	7^{7}
WC	(Netherlands) Scott Griekspoor	7^{7}	6^{2}	6^{1}
WC	(Netherlands) Jelle Sels	1	6^{2}
8	(Italy) Thomas Fabbiano	6	7^{7}

Qualifying competition
3	(Romania) Marius Copil	5	6	6^{5}
8	(Italy) Thomas Fabbiano	7	3	7^{7}

==== Fourth qualifier ====
First round
4	(Germany) Peter Gojowczyk	7^{9}	6
(Russia) Evgeny Donskoy	6^{7}	4
(Russia) Andrey Rublev	7^{7}	6^{4}	6
5	(United States) Denis Kudla	6^{4}	7^{7}	2

Qualifying competition
4	(Germany) Peter Gojowczyk	6	6^{2}	6
(Russia) Andrey Rublev	4	7^{7}	2
