= 1994 ABN AMRO World Tennis Tournament =

- Date: 21–27 February
- Edition: 22nd
- Category: ATP World Series
- Draw: 32S / 16D
- Prize money: $575,000
- Surface: Carpet / indoor
- Location: Rotterdam, Netherlands
- Venue: Rotterdam Ahoy

Champions

Singles
- (Germany) Michael Stich

Doubles
- (United Kingdom) Jeremy Bates / (Sweden) Jonas Björkman
- ABN AMRO World Tennis Tournament

The 1994 ABN AMRO World Tennis Tournament was a tennis tournament played on indoor carpet courts. It was the 22nd edition of the event known that year as the ABN AMRO World Tennis Tournament, and was part of the ATP World Series of the 1994 ATP Tour. It took place at the Rotterdam Ahoy indoor sporting arena in Rotterdam, Netherlands, from 21 February through 27 February 1994. Michael Stich won the singles title.

The singles field was led by ATP No. 4, 1993 ATP Tour World Championships titlist and recent Marseille semifinalist Michael Stich, Australian Open quarterfinalist and Stuttgart Indoor runner-up Goran Ivanišević, and other Australian Open quarterfinalist, Auckland and Dubai champion Magnus Gustafsson. Other seeds were Milan champion Boris Becker, Oahu titlist Wayne Ferreira, Alexander Volkov, Karel Nováček and Jonas Svensson.

== Finals ==
=== Singles ===
(Germany) Michael Stich defeated (South Africa) Wayne Ferreira 4–6, 6–3, 6–0

- It was Michael Stich's 1st title of the year, and his 14th overall.

=== Doubles ===
(United Kingdom) Jeremy Bates / (Sweden) Jonas Björkman defeated (Netherlands) Jacco Eltingh / (Netherlands) Paul Haarhuis 6–4, 6–1
