= 2019 ABN AMRO World Tennis Tournament – Doubles =

Doubles
- 2019 ABN AMRO World Tennis Tournament

Final
- Champions: (France) Jérémy Chardy (Finland) Henri Kontinen
- Runners-up: (Netherlands) Jean-Julien Rojer (Romania) Horia Tecău
- Score: 7–6^{(7–5)}, 7–6^{(7–4)}

Events
Singles	Doubles
← 2018 ·	ABN AMRO World Tennis Tournament	· 2020 →

Pierre-Hugues Herbert and Nicolas Mahut were the defending champions, but chose not to defend their title.

Jérémy Chardy and Henri Kontinen won the title, defeating Jean-Julien Rojer and Horia Tecău in the final, 7–6^{(7–5)}, 7–6^{(7–4)}.

== Seeds ==
1. (Austria) Oliver Marach / (Croatia) Mate Pavić (first round)
2. (Poland) Łukasz Kubot / (Brazil) Marcelo Melo (first round)
3. (South Africa) Raven Klaasen / (New Zealand) Michael Venus (first round)
4. (Spain) Marcel Granollers / (Croatia) Nikola Mektić (semifinals)

== Draw ==
=== Key ===
- Q = Qualifier
- WC = Wild card
- LL = Lucky loser
- Alt = Alternate
- SE = Special exempt
- PR = Protected ranking
- ITF = ITF entry
- JE = Junior exempt
- w/o = Walkover
- r = Retired
- d = Defaulted
- SR = Special ranking

=== Draw ===
First round
1	(Austria) O Marach (Croatia) M Pavić	3	7^{7}	[3]
(Croatia) I Dodig (France) É Roger-Vasselin	6	6^{5}	[10]
(France) J Chardy (Finland) H Kontinen	2	6	[10]
(Japan) B McLachlan (Germany) J-L Struff	6	3	[5]
4	(Spain) M Granollers (Croatia) N Mektić	7	6
Q	(Netherlands) S Arends (Netherlands) D Pel	5	4
(Germany) P Kohlschreiber (Spain) F Verdasco	7	3	[10]
LL	(United States) A Krajicek (New Zealand) A Sitak	5	6	[7]
LL	(Georgia (country)) N Basilashvili (Australia) M Ebden	3	4
(Netherlands) J-J Rojer (Romania) H Tecău	6	6
WC	(Netherlands) W Koolhof (Austria) J Melzer	6	6
3	(South Africa) R Klaasen (New Zealand) M Venus	4	4
(United Kingdom) D Inglot (Croatia) F Škugor	7^{9}	3	[4]
WC	(Netherlands) R Haase (Netherlands) M Middelkoop	6^{7}	6	[10]
(United States) R Ram (United Kingdom) J Salisbury	6	7^{7}
2	(Poland) Ł Kubot (Brazil) M Melo	4	6^{2}

Quarterfinals
(Croatia) I Dodig (France) É Roger-Vasselin	6	2	[9]
(France) J Chardy (Finland) H Kontinen	4	6	[11]
4	(Spain) M Granollers (Croatia) N Mektić	w/o
(Germany) P Kohlschreiber (Spain) F Verdasco
(Netherlands) J-J Rojer (Romania) H Tecău	6	6
WC	(Netherlands) W Koolhof (Austria) J Melzer	1	2
WC	(Netherlands) R Haase (Netherlands) M Middelkoop	6^{4}	4
(United States) R Ram (United Kingdom) J Salisbury	7^{7}	6

Semifinals
(France) J Chardy (Finland) H Kontinen	6^{3}	6	[10]
4	(Spain) M Granollers (Croatia) N Mektić	7^{7}	4	[6]
(Netherlands) J-J Rojer (Romania) H Tecău	3	6	[10]
(United States) R Ram (United Kingdom) J Salisbury	6	2	[7]

Final
(France) J Chardy (Finland) H Kontinen	7^{7}	7^{7}
(Netherlands) J-J Rojer (Romania) H Tecău	6^{5}	6^{4}

== Qualifying ==
=== Seeds ===
1. (United States) Austin Krajicek / (New Zealand) Artem Sitak (qualifying competition, lucky losers)
2. (Netherlands) Sander Arends / (Netherlands) David Pel (qualified)

=== Qualifiers ===
1. (Netherlands) Sander Arends / (Netherlands) David Pel

=== Lucky losers ===
1. (United States) Austin Krajicek / (New Zealand) Artem Sitak
2. (Georgia (country)) Nikoloz Basilashvili / (Australia) Matthew Ebden

=== Qualifying draw ===
First round
1	(United States) Austin Krajicek (New Zealand) Artem Sitak	6	5	[10]
(France) Fabrice Martin (France) Gilles Simon	3	7	[8]
(Georgia (country)) Nikoloz Basilashvili (Australia) Matthew Ebden	2	7^{7}	[3]
2/WC	(Netherlands) Sander Arends (Netherlands) David Pel	6	6^{4}	[10]

Qualifying competition
1	(United States) Austin Krajicek (New Zealand) Artem Sitak	6^{5}	3
2/WC	(Netherlands) Sander Arends (Netherlands) David Pel	7^{7}	6
