= 2006 ABN AMRO World Tennis Tournament – Singles =

Singles
- 2006 ABN AMRO World Tennis Tournament

Final
- Champion: (Czech Republic) Radek Štěpánek
- Runner-up: (Belgium) Christophe Rochus
- Score: 6–0, 6–3

Details
- Draw: 32 (4 Q / 3 WC )
- Seeds: 8

Events
Singles	Doubles
- ABN AMRO World Tennis Tournament

Roger Federer was the defending champion, but chose not to participate that year.

Radek Štěpánek won in the final 6–0, 6–3, against Christophe Rochus. It was his first ATP Tour singles title.

== Seeds ==
1. (Spain) Rafael Nadal (withdrew due to a leg injury)
2. (Russia) Nikolay Davydenko (semifinals)
3. (Spain) David Ferrer (second round)
4. (Sweden) Thomas Johansson (first round)
5. (Croatia) Mario Ančić (first round)
6. (Czech Republic) Radek Štěpánek (champion)
7. (France) Sébastien Grosjean (withdrew due to personal reasons)
8. (Czech Republic) Tomáš Berdych (first round)
9. (Russia) Igor Andreev (first round)

== Draw ==
Key

- Q = Qualifier
- WC = Wild card
- LL = Lucky loser
- Alt = Alternate
- ITF = ITF entry
- PR = Protected ranking
- SR = Special ranking
- SE = Special exempt
- JE = Junior exempt
- JR = Junior Accelerator Programme entrant
- CO = College Accelerator Programme entrant
- NG = Next Gen Accelerator Program entrant
- w/o = Walkover
- r = Retired
- d = Defaulted

=== Finals ===
Semifinals
(Belgium) Christophe Rochus	6	6
(Finland) Jarkko Nieminen	4	3
6	(Czech Republic) Radek Štěpánek	4	6	6
2	(Russia) Nikolay Davydenko	6	3	3

Final
(Belgium) Christophe Rochus	0	3
6	(Czech Republic) Radek Štěpánek	6	6

=== Top half ===
First round
LL	(United Kingdom) A Parmar	7	5	7
(Thailand) P Srichaphan	6^{3}	7	6^{7}
WC	(Netherlands) R Sluiter	4	r
Q	(Germany) D Meffert	2
LL	(Monaco) J-R Lisnard	6	6^{3}	4
(Belgium) C Rochus	3	7	6
(United States) T Dent	6	7
8	(Czech Republic) T Berdych	4	5
3	(Spain) D Ferrer	6	6
(Czech Republic) I Minář	2	3
(Belgium) O Rochus	7	4	7
(Austria) J Melzer	6^{3}	6	6^{9}
(South Africa) W Moodie	3	7	3
Q	(France) G Simon	6	6^{4}	6
(Finland) J Nieminen	7	7
5	(Croatia) M Ančić	5	6^{5}

Second round
LL	(United Kingdom) A Parmar	6	6
Q	(Germany) D Meffert	3	3
(Belgium) C Rochus	7
(United States) T Dent	6^{0}	r
3	(Spain) D Ferrer	4	4
(Belgium) O Rochus	6	6
Q	(France) G Simon	6^{1}	1
(Finland) J Nieminen	7	6

Quarterfinals
LL	(United Kingdom) A Parmar	3	3
(Belgium) C Rochus	6	6
(Belgium) O Rochus	7	4	6^{3}
(Finland) J Nieminen	6^{4}	6	7

Semifinals
(Belgium) C Rochus	6	6
(Finland) J Nieminen	4	3

=== Bottom half ===
First round
6	(Czech Republic) R Štěpánek	6	6
LL	(Switzerland) M Lammer	4	2
(France) F Santoro	6	6
(France) P-H Mathieu	3	3
Q	(Serbia and Montenegro) N Djokovic	6	2	7
(Italy) A Seppi	2	6	5
(United Kingdom) T Henman	6	6
4	(Sweden) T Johansson	4	4
9	(Russia) I Andreev	2	3
Q	(Italy) D Bracciali	6	6
WC	(Netherlands) A van der Duim	2	6^{2}
LL	(Spain) Á Calatrava	6	7
(Czech Republic) R Vik	3	5
(United Kingdom) G Rusedski	6	7
(Czech Republic) J Hernych	3	3
2	(Russia) N Davydenko	6	6

Second round
6	(Czech Republic) R Štěpánek	6	6
(France) F Santoro	4	1
Q	(Serbia and Montenegro) N Djokovic	5	6	6
(United Kingdom) T Henman	7	3	4
Q	(Italy) D Bracciali	4	6	7
LL	(Spain) Á Calatrava	6	2	6^{5}
(United Kingdom) G Rusedski	4	1
2	(Russia) N Davydenko	6	6

Quarterfinals
6	(Czech Republic) R Štěpánek	7	4	7
Q	(Serbia and Montenegro) N Djokovic	5	6	6^{2}
Q	(Italy) D Bracciali	4	2
2	(Russia) N Davydenko	6	6

Semifinals
6	(Czech Republic) R Štěpánek	4	6	6
2	(Russia) N Davydenko	6	3	3
