= 2008 ABN AMRO World Tennis Tournament – Doubles =

Doubles
- 2008 ABN AMRO World Tennis Tournament

Final
- Champions: (Czech Republic) Tomáš Berdych; (Russia) Dmitry Tursunov
- Runners-up: (Germany) Philipp Kohlschreiber; (Russia) Mikhail Youzhny
- Score: 7–5, 3–6, [10–7]

Events
Singles	Doubles
← 2007 ·	ABN AMRO World Tennis Tournament	· 2009 →

Martin Damm and Leander Paes were the defending champions, but Paes chose not to participate, and only Damm competed that year.
Damm partnered with Pavel Vízner, but lost in the first round to Philipp Kohlschreiber and Mikhail Youzhny.

Tomáš Berdych and Dmitry Tursunov won in the final 7–5, 3–6, [10–7], against Philipp Kohlschreiber and Mikhail Youzhny.

== Seeds ==
1. (Canada) Daniel Nestor / (Serbia) Nenad Zimonjić (first round)
2. (Sweden) Simon Aspelin / (Austria) Julian Knowle (semifinals)
3. (Israel) Jonathan Erlich / (Israel) Andy Ram (semifinals)
4. (Czech Republic) Martin Damm / (Czech Republic) Pavel Vízner (first round)

== Draw ==
=== Key ===
- Q = Qualifier
- WC = Wild card
- LL = Lucky loser
- Alt = Alternate
- SE = Special exempt
- PR = Protected ranking
- ITF = ITF entry
- JE = Junior exempt
- w/o = Walkover
- r = Retired
- d = Defaulted
- SR = Special ranking

=== Draw ===
First round

Quarterfinals

Semifinals

Final

1
- (Canada) D Nestor
- (Serbia) N Zimonjić
4
6
[10]

WC
- (Netherlands) R Haase
- (Netherlands) P Wessels
6
3
[12]

WC
- (Netherlands) R Haase
- (Netherlands) P Wessels
1
4

- (Germany) C Kas
- (Netherlands) R Wassen
2
4

- (Czech Republic) T Berdych
- (Russia) D Tursunov
6
6

- (Czech Republic) T Berdych
- (Russia) D Tursunov
6
6

- (Czech Republic) T Berdych
- (Russia) D Tursunov
7
4
[10]

3
- (Israel) J Erlich
- (Israel) A Ram
7
6

3
- (Israel) J Erlich
- (Israel) A Ram
5
6
[7]

- (South Africa) J Coetzee
- (South Africa) W Moodie
6^{5}
3

3
- (Israel) J Erlich
- (Israel) A Ram
6
5
[10]

- (Australia) P Hanley
- (Sweden) R Lindstedt
5
4

- (France) J Benneteau
- (France) N Mahut
2
7
[6]

- (France) J Benneteau
- (France) N Mahut
7
6

- (Czech Republic) T Berdych
- (Russia) D Tursunov
7
3
[10]

- (Poland) M Fyrstenberg
- (Poland) M Matkowski
6
6

- (Germany) P Kohlschreiber
- (Russia) M Youzhny
5
6
[7]

- (Australia) J Kerr
- (Czech Republic) D Škoch
4
3

- (Poland) M Fyrstenberg
- (Poland) M Matkowski
6^{6}
6^{5}

- (Germany) P Kohlschreiber
- (Russia) M Youzhny
7
6

- (Germany) P Kohlschreiber
- (Russia) M Youzhny
7
7

4
- (Czech Republic) M Damm
- (Czech Republic) P Vízner
5
4

- (Germany) P Kohlschreiber
- (Russia) M Youzhny
7
7

- (Spain) R Nadal
- (Spain) T Robredo
7
7

2
- (Sweden) S Aspelin
- (Austria) J Knowle
6^{5}
5

- (Spain) F López
- (Spain) F Verdasco
6^{2}
5

- (Spain) R Nadal
- (Spain) T Robredo

- (Netherlands) J Huta Galung
- (Netherlands) M Middelkoop
3
5

2
- (Sweden) S Aspelin
- (Austria) J Knowle
w/o

2
- (Sweden) S Aspelin
- (Austria) J Knowle
6
7
