= 2007 ABN AMRO World Tennis Tournament – Singles =

Singles
- 2007 ABN AMRO World Tennis Tournament

Final
- Champion: (Russia) Mikhail Youzhny
- Runner-up: (Croatia) Ivan Ljubičić
- Score: 6–2, 6–4

Details
- Draw: 32 (4 Q / 3 WC )
- Seeds: 8

Events
Singles	Doubles
- ABN AMRO World Tennis Tournament

Mikhail Youzhny defeated Ivan Ljubičić in the final, 6–2, 6–4. He saved three match points en route to the title, in the semifinals against Novak Djokovic.

Radek Štěpánek was the defending champion, but lost in the second round to Philipp Kohlschreiber.

== Seeds ==
1. (Russia) Nikolay Davydenko (semifinals)
2. (Spain) Tommy Robredo (quarterfinals)
3. (Croatia) Ivan Ljubičić (final)
4. (Czech Republic) Tomáš Berdych (first round)
5. (Serbia) Novak Djokovic (semifinals)
6. (Spain) David Ferrer (quarterfinals)
7. (Australia) Lleyton Hewitt (withdrew due to a hamstring injury)
8. (Czech Republic) Radek Štěpánek (second round)

== Draw ==
Key

- Q = Qualifier
- WC = Wild card
- LL = Lucky loser
- Alt = Alternate
- ITF = ITF entry
- PR = Protected ranking
- SR = Special ranking
- SE = Special exempt
- JE = Junior exempt
- JR = Junior Accelerator Programme entrant
- CO = College Accelerator Programme entrant
- NG = Next Gen Accelerator Program entrant
- w/o = Walkover
- r = Retired
- d = Defaulted

=== Finals ===
Semifinals
1	(Russia) Nikolay Davydenko	6	6^{4}	6^{4}
3	(Croatia) Ivan Ljubičić	4	7	7
(Russia) Mikhail Youzhny	3	7	7
5	(Serbia) Novak Djokovic	6	6^{7}	5

Final
3	(Croatia) Ivan Ljubičić	2	4
(Russia) Mikhail Youzhny	6	6

=== Top half ===
First round
1	(Russia) N Davydenko	6	6
LL	(Germany) M Berrer	3	4
(France) M Gicquel	6	6
(France) A Clément	4	3
(France) G Simon	3	1	r
(Germany) P Kohlschreiber	6	3
Q	(Czech Republic) J Hernych	2	5
8	(Czech Republic) R Štěpánek	6	7
3	(Croatia) I Ljubičić	7	6
WC	(Netherlands) T de Bakker	5	3
(Serbia) J Tipsarević	6	2	4
(Belgium) O Rochus	4	6	6
(Slovakia) D Hrbatý	6^{5}	6	5
(Germany) F Mayer	7	2	7
(France) G Monfils	7	4	3
LL	(Netherlands) D van Scheppingen	6^{3}	6	6

Second round
1	(Russia) N Davydenko	6	6
(France) M Gicquel	3	3
(Germany) P Kohlschreiber	7	7
8	(Czech Republic) R Štěpánek	6^{12}	6^{6}
3	(Croatia) I Ljubičić	6	7
(Belgium) O Rochus	3	6^{4}
(Germany) F Mayer	7	6
LL	(Netherlands) D van Scheppingen	5	2

Quarterfinals
1	(Russia) N Davydenko	6^{6}	6	6
(Germany) P Kohlschreiber	7	4	4
3	(Croatia) I Ljubičić	6	6
(Germany) F Mayer	4	2

Semifinals
1	(Russia) N Davydenko	6	6^{4}	6^{4}
3	(Croatia) I Ljubičić	4	7	7

=== Bottom half ===
First round
6	(Spain) D Ferrer	6	6
(Belgium) C Rochus	3	0
(Belgium) K Vliegen	6	6
(Finland) J Nieminen	1	4
WC	(Netherlands) R Haase	6	7
Q	(Croatia) R Karanušić	3	6^{2}
(Russia) M Youzhny	6	6^{5}	6
4	(Czech Republic) T Berdych	4	7	1
5	(Serbia) N Djokovic	7	6
Q	(France) F Serra	6^{6}	4
Q	(Romania) A Pavel	6	6
(Italy) D Bracciali	1	1
LL	(South Africa) R de Voest	6	7
WC	(Netherlands) M Verkerk	3	6
LL	(Italy) S Bolelli	2	2
2	(Spain) T Robredo	6	6

Second round
6	(Spain) D Ferrer	6	6
(Belgium) K Vliegen	4	2
WC	(Netherlands) R Haase	2	4
(Russia) M Youzhny	6	6
5	(Serbia) N Djokovic	6^{8}	6	6
Q	(Romania) A Pavel	7	1	3
LL	(South Africa) R de Voest	0	4
2	(Spain) T Robredo	6	6

Quarterfinals
6	(Spain) D Ferrer	2	5
(Russia) M Youzhny	6	7
5	(Serbia) N Djokovic	4	6	7
2	(Spain) T Robredo	6	4	5

Semifinals
(Russia) M Youzhny	3	7	7
5	(Serbia) N Djokovic	6	6^{7}	5
