= 1994 ABN AMRO World Tennis Tournament – Doubles =

Doubles
- 1994 ABN AMRO World Tennis Tournament

Final
- Champions: (United Kingdom) Jeremy Bates (Sweden) Jonas Björkman
- Runners-up: (Netherlands) Jacco Eltingh (Netherlands) Paul Haarhuis
- Score: 6–4, 6–1

Details
- Draw: 16
- Seeds: 4

Events
Singles	Doubles
- ABN AMRO World Tennis Tournament

Henrik Holm and Anders Järryd were the defending champions, but lost in the quarterfinals to Boris Becker and John McEnroe.

Jeremy Bates and Jonas Björkman won in the final 6–4, 6–1, against Jacco Eltingh and Paul Haarhuis.

== Seeds ==
1. (Netherlands) Jacco Eltingh / (Netherlands) Paul Haarhuis (final)
2. (Netherlands) Tom Nijssen / (Czech Republic) Cyril Suk (first round)
3. (South Africa) David Adams / (Russia) Andrei Olhovskiy (quarterfinals)
4. (Czech Republic) Martin Damm / (Czech Republic) Karel Nováček (first round)

== Draw ==
Key

- Q = Qualifier
- WC = Wild card
- LL = Lucky loser
- Alt = Alternate
- ITF = ITF entry
- PR = Protected ranking
- SR = Special ranking
- SE = Special exempt
- JE = Junior exempt
- JR = Junior Accelerator Programme entrant
- CO = College Accelerator Programme entrant
- NG = Next Gen Accelerator Program entrant
- w/o = Walkover
- r = Retired
- d = Defaulted

=== Draw ===
First round
1	(Netherlands) J Eltingh (Netherlands) P Haarhuis	6	4	7
(Germany) D Prinosil (West Germany) U Riglewski	1	6	6
(Netherlands) HJ Davids (South Africa) P Norval	6	6	6
(West Germany) P Kühnen (Germany) M Stich	4	7	7
3	(South Africa) D Adams (Russia) A Olhovskiy	6	7
WC	(Italy) O Camporese (Sweden) J Svensson	3	6
(Russia) Y Kafelnikov (Netherlands) M Oosting	6	5	6
(Netherlands) M Koevermans (Belgium) L Pimek	2	7	1
(Italy) D Nargiso (Sweden) P Nyborg	5	1
Q	(Australia) J Eagle (Australia) A Florent	7	6
(United Kingdom) J Bates (Sweden) J Björkman	7	6
4	(Czech Republic) M Damm (Czech Republic) K Nováček	5	3
WC	(Germany) B Becker (United States) J McEnroe	7	7
(Netherlands) J Siemerink (Czech Republic) D Vacek	6	6
(Sweden) H Holm (Sweden) A Järryd	7	6
2	(Netherlands) T Nijssen (Czech Republic) C Suk	5	1

Quarterfinals
1	(Netherlands) J Eltingh (Netherlands) P Haarhuis	6	6
(West Germany) P Kühnen (Germany) M Stich	3	4
3	(South Africa) D Adams (Russia) A Olhovskiy	6	3
(Russia) Y Kafelnikov (Netherlands) M Oosting	7	6
Q	(Australia) J Eagle (Australia) A Florent	0	5
(United Kingdom) J Bates (Sweden) J Björkman	6	7
WC	(Germany) B Becker (United States) J McEnroe	7	6
(Sweden) H Holm (Sweden) A Järryd	6	4

Semifinals
1	(Netherlands) J Eltingh (Netherlands) P Haarhuis	6	7
(Russia) Y Kafelnikov (Netherlands) M Oosting	3	5
(United Kingdom) J Bates (Sweden) J Björkman	6	6
WC	(Germany) B Becker (United States) J McEnroe	4	4

Final
1	(Netherlands) J Eltingh (Netherlands) P Haarhuis	4	1
(United Kingdom) J Bates (Sweden) J Björkman	6	6
