= 1991 ABN AMRO World Tennis Tournament =

- Date: 25 February – 3 March
- Edition: 19th
- Category: ATP World Series
- Draw: 32S / 16D
- Prize money: $450,000
- Surface: Carpet / indoor
- Location: Rotterdam, Netherlands
- Venue: Rotterdam Ahoy

Champions

Singles
- (Italy) Omar Camporese

Doubles
- (United States) Patrick Galbraith / (Sweden) Anders Järryd
- ABN AMRO World Tennis Tournament

The 1991 ABN AMRO World Tennis Tournament was a men's tennis tournament played on indoor carpet courts. It was the 19th edition of the event known that year as the ABN AMRO World Tennis Tournament, and was part of the ATP World Series of the 1991 ATP Tour. It took place at the Rotterdam Ahoy indoor sporting arena in Rotterdam, Netherlands, from 25 February through 3 March 1991. Unseeded Omar Camporese won the singles title.

The singles line up was headlined by Association of Tennis Professionals (ATP) No. 3, Australian Open runner-up, Philadelphia and Memphis winner Ivan Lendl, reigning Rome champion, ATP Comeback Player of the Year Thomas Muster, and Estoril titlist Emilio Sánchez. Also present were Wimbledon semifinalist Goran Ivanišević, Monte Carlo and Tel Aviv winner Andrei Chesnokov, Jonas Svensson, Jakob Hlasek and Karel Nováček.

== Finals ==
=== Singles ===
(Italy) Omar Camporese defeated (Czechoslovakia) Ivan Lendl 3–6, 7–6^{(7–4)}, 7–6^{(7–4)}

- It was Camporese's 1st singles title of his career.

=== Doubles ===
(United States) Patrick Galbraith / (Sweden) Anders Järryd defeated (United States) Steve DeVries / (Australia) David Macpherson 7–6, 6–2
