= 1980 ABN World Tennis Tournament =

- Date: 10–16 March
- Edition: 8th
- Category: Grand Prix circuit
- Draw: 32S / 16D
- Prize money: $175,000
- Surface: Carpet / indoor
- Location: Rotterdam, Netherlands
- Venue: Rotterdam Ahoy

Champions

Singles
- (Switzerland) Heinz Günthardt

Doubles
- (India) Vijay Amritraj / (United States) Stan Smith
- ABN World Tennis Tournament

The 1980 ABN World Tennis Tournament was a tennis tournament played on indoor carpet courts at Rotterdam Ahoy in the Netherlands. It was part of the 1980 Volvo Grand Prix circuit. It was the eighth edition of the tournament and was held from 10 March through 16 March 1980. Unseeded Heinz Günthardt won the singles title.

== Finals ==
=== Singles ===
(Switzerland) Heinz Günthardt defeated (United States) Gene Mayer 6–2, 6–4

=== Doubles ===
(India) Vijay Amritraj / (United States) Stan Smith defeated (United States) Bill Scanlon / (United States) Brian Teacher 6–4, 6–2
