= 2006 ABN AMRO World Tennis Tournament – Doubles =

Doubles
- 2006 ABN AMRO World Tennis Tournament

Final
- Champions: (Australia) Paul Hanley (Zimbabwe) Kevin Ullyett
- Runners-up: (Israel) Jonathan Erlich (Israel) Andy Ram
- Score: 7–6^{(7–4)}, 7–6^{(7–2)}

Events
Singles	Doubles
← 2005 ·	ABN AMRO World Tennis Tournament	· 2007 →

Jonathan Erlich and Andy Ram were the defending champions, but Paul Hanley and Kevin Ullyett defeated them 7–6^{(7–4)}, 7–6^{(7–2)}, in the final.

== Seeds ==
1. (The Bahamas) Mark Knowles / (Canada) Daniel Nestor (first round)
2. (Australia) Paul Hanley / (Zimbabwe) Kevin Ullyett (champions)
3. (Czech Republic) Martin Damm / (India) Leander Paes (first round)
4. (France) Fabrice Santoro / (Serbia and Montenegro) Nenad Zimonjić (quarterfinals)

== Draw ==
=== Key ===
- Q = Qualifier
- WC = Wild card
- LL = Lucky loser
- Alt = Alternate
- SE = Special exempt
- PR = Protected ranking
- ITF = ITF entry
- JE = Junior exempt
- w/o = Walkover
- r = Retired
- d = Defaulted
- SR = Special ranking

=== Draw ===
First round
1	(The Bahamas) M Knowles (Canada) D Nestor	4	4
(Israel) J Erlich (Israel) A Ram	6	6
(India) M Bhupathi (South Africa) W Moodie	w/o
(Serbia and Montenegro) N Djokovic (Italy) A Seppi
3	(Czech Republic) M Damm (India) L Paes	6^{7}	6^{5}
(Croatia) M Ančić (Sweden) T Johansson	7	7
(Czech Republic) T Berdych (Czech Republic) C Suk	3	6	[10]
ALT	(Netherlands) M Koning (Netherlands) S Korteling	6	3	[8]
(Austria) J Knowle (Austria) J Melzer	6	6
(Germany) M Kohlmann (Czech Republic) P Pála	2	3
(Spain) D Ferrer (Czech Republic) R Vik	7	3	[5]
4	(France) F Santoro (Serbia and Montenegro) N Zimonjić	5	6	[10]
(Finland) J Nieminen (Thailand) P Srichaphan	5	6	[10]
(Belgium) C Rochus (Belgium) O Rochus	7	3	[5]
WC	(Netherlands) T de Bakker (Netherlands) A van der Duim	2	1
2	(Australia) P Hanley (Zimbabwe) K Ullyett	6	6

Quarterfinals
(Israel) J Erlich (Israel) A Ram	7	7
(India) M Bhupathi (South Africa) W Moodie	5	6^{4}
(Croatia) M Ančić (Sweden) T Johansson
(Czech Republic) T Berdych (Czech Republic) C Suk	w/o
(Austria) J Knowle (Austria) J Melzer	6^{2}	7	[10]
4	(France) F Santoro (Serbia and Montenegro) N Zimonjić	7	6^{3}	[5]
(Finland) J Nieminen (Thailand) P Srichaphan	4	4
2	(Australia) P Hanley (Zimbabwe) K Ullyett	6	6

Semifinals
(Israel) J Erlich (Israel) A Ram	6	6
(Czech Republic) T Berdych (Czech Republic) C Suk	3	4
(Austria) J Knowle (Austria) J Melzer	7	3	[7]
2	(Australia) P Hanley (Zimbabwe) K Ullyett	5	6	[10]

Final
(Israel) J Erlich (Israel) A Ram	6^{4}	6^{2}
2	(Australia) P Hanley (Zimbabwe) K Ullyett	7	7
