= 1978 ABN World Tennis Tournament =

- Date: 3–9 April
- Edition: 6th
- Category: Grand Prix circuit (WCT)
- Prize money: $175,000
- Surface: Carpet / indoor
- Location: Rotterdam, Netherlands
- Venue: Rotterdam Ahoy

Champions

Singles
- (United States) Jimmy Connors

Doubles
- (United States) Fred McNair / (Mexico) Raúl Ramírez
- Rotterdam Open

The 1978 ABN World Tennis Tournament was a men's tennis tournament played on indoor carpet courts at Rotterdam Ahoy in the Netherlands. It was a World Championship Tennis (WCT) event that was part of the 1978 Colgate-Palmolive Grand Prix circuit. It was the sixth edition of the tournament and was held from 3 April through 9 April 1978. First-seeded Jimmy Connors won the singles title.

== Finals ==
=== Singles ===
(United States) Jimmy Connors defeated (Mexico) Raúl Ramírez 7–5, 7–5

=== Doubles ===
(United States) Fred McNair / (Mexico) Raúl Ramírez defeated (United States) Robert Lutz / (United States) Stan Smith 6–2, 6–3
