= 2007 ABN AMRO World Tennis Tournament – Doubles =

Doubles
- 2007 ABN AMRO World Tennis Tournament

Final
- Champions: (Czech Republic) Martin Damm (India) Leander Paes
- Runners-up: (Romania) Andrei Pavel (Germany) Alexander Waske
- Score: 6–3, 6–7^{(5–7)}, [10–7]

Events
Singles	Doubles
← 2006 ·	ABN AMRO World Tennis Tournament	· 2008 →

Paul Hanley and Kevin Ullyett were the defending champions, but lost in the first round to Andrei Pavel and Alexander Waske.

Martin Damm and Leander Paes won in the final 6–3, 6–7^{(5–7)}, [10–7], against Andrei Pavel and Alexander Waske.

== Seeds ==
1. (United States) Bob Bryan / (United States) Mike Bryan (quarterfinals, withdrew due to a flu for Bob Bryan)
2. (The Bahamas) Mark Knowles / (Canada) Daniel Nestor (quarterfinals)
3. (Australia) Paul Hanley / (Zimbabwe) Kevin Ullyett (first round)
4. (Czech Republic) Martin Damm / (India) Leander Paes (champions)

== Draw ==
=== Key ===
- Q = Qualifier
- WC = Wild card
- LL = Lucky loser
- Alt = Alternate
- SE = Special exempt
- PR = Protected ranking
- ITF = ITF entry
- JE = Junior exempt
- w/o = Walkover
- r = Retired
- d = Defaulted
- SR = Special ranking

=== Draw ===
First round
1	(United States) B Bryan (United States) M Bryan	6	6^{6}	[10]
(France) M Gicquel (France) G Simon	3	7	[4]
(India) M Bhupathi (Serbia) N Zimonjić	7	6
(Belgium) O Rochus (Belgium) K Vliegen	5	2
4	(Czech Republic) M Damm (India) L Paes	6	6
(Italy) S Bolelli (Italy) F Cipolla	4	1
WC	(Netherlands) T de Bakker (Croatia) I Ljubičić	4	7	[10]
(Netherlands) J Smit (Netherlands) M van Haasteren	6	6^{5}	[8]
WC	(Netherlands) R Haase (Netherlands) I Sijsling	6	6
(Czech Republic) J Hernych (Serbia) J Tipsarević	4	4
(Romania) A Pavel (Germany) A Waske	7	6^{5}	[10]
3	(Australia) P Hanley (Zimbabwe) K Ullyett	6^{6}	7	[7]
(South Africa) R de Voest (Belgium) C Rochus	4	6	[2]
(Italy) D Bracciali (Czech Republic) P Pála	6	1	[10]
(South Africa) J Coetzee (Netherlands) R Wassen	6	6^{1}	[6]
2	(The Bahamas) M Knowles (Canada) D Nestor	4	7	[10]

Quarterfinals
1	(United States) B Bryan (United States) M Bryan
(India) M Bhupathi (Serbia) N Zimonjić	w/o
4	(Czech Republic) M Damm (India) L Paes	6^{3}	6	[10]
WC	(Netherlands) T de Bakker (Croatia) I Ljubičić	7	4	[6]
WC	(Netherlands) R Haase (Netherlands) I Sijsling	3	3
(Romania) A Pavel (Germany) A Waske	6	6
(Italy) D Bracciali (Czech Republic) P Pála	6	2	[11]
2	(The Bahamas) M Knowles (Canada) D Nestor	4	6	[9]

Semifinals
(India) M Bhupathi (Serbia) N Zimonjić	7	6^{5}	[10]
4	(Czech Republic) M Damm (India) L Paes	6^{5}	7	[12]
(Romania) A Pavel (Germany) A Waske	7	7
(Italy) D Bracciali (Czech Republic) P Pála	5	6^{4}

Final
4	(Czech Republic) M Damm (India) L Paes	6	6^{5}	[10]
(Romania) A Pavel (Germany) A Waske	3	7	[7]
