= 2008 ABN AMRO World Tennis Tournament – Singles =

Singles
- 2008 ABN AMRO World Tennis Tournament

Final
- Champion: (France) Michaël Llodra
- Runner-up: (Sweden) Robin Söderling
- Score: 6–7^{(3–7)}, 6–3, 7–6^{(7–4)}

Details
- Draw: 32 (4Q / 3WC)
- Seeds: 8

Events
Singles	Doubles
- ABN AMRO World Tennis Tournament

Mikhail Youzhny was the defending champion, but lost in the first round to Janko Tipsarević.

None of the 8 seeded players reached quarter-finals. Michaël Llodra won his only ATP 500 singles final 6–7^{(3–7)}, 6–3, 7–6^{(7–4)}, against Robin Söderling.

== Seeds ==
1. (Spain) Rafael Nadal (second round)
2. (Russia) Nikolay Davydenko (second round)
3. (Spain) David Ferrer (second round)
4. (Russia) Mikhail Youzhny (first round)
5. (Czech Republic) Tomáš Berdych (second round)
6. (United Kingdom) Andy Murray (first round)
7. (Spain) Juan Carlos Ferrero (first round)
8. (Cyprus) Marcos Baghdatis (first round)

== Draw ==
Key

- Q = Qualifier
- WC = Wild card
- LL = Lucky loser
- Alt = Alternate
- ITF = ITF entry
- PR = Protected ranking
- SR = Special ranking
- SE = Special exempt
- JE = Junior exempt
- JR = Junior Accelerator Programme entrant
- CO = College Accelerator Programme entrant
- NG = Next Gen Accelerator Program entrant
- w/o = Walkover
- r = Retired
- d = Defaulted

=== Finals ===
Semifinals
(Sweden) Robin Söderling	6	6
(France) Gilles Simon	2	1
(Croatia) Ivo Karlović	5	6^{4}
(France) Michaël Llodra	7	7

Final
(Sweden) Robin Söderling	7	3	6^{4}
(France) Michaël Llodra	6^{3}	6	7

=== Top half ===
First round
1	(Spain) R Nadal	6	6
(Russia) D Tursunov	4	4
(Australia) L Hewitt	6	6^{4}	6^{4}
(Italy) A Seppi	3	7	7
(Finland) J Nieminen	2	2
(Spain) F Verdasco	6	6
(Sweden) R Söderling	6	3	6
8/WC	(Cyprus) M Baghdatis	3	6	4
4	(Russia) M Youzhny	6^{3}	4
(Serbia) J Tipsarević	7	6
(Spain) F López	3	4
(France) G Simon	6	6
(France) N Mahut	7	6
(Spain) T Robredo	5	4
Q	(Russia) T Gabashvili	7	6
7	(Spain) JC Ferrero	5	1

Second round
1	(Spain) R Nadal	6	3	4
(Italy) A Seppi	3	6	6
(Spain) F Verdasco	4	1
(Sweden) R Söderling	6	6
(Serbia) J Tipsarević	6^{4}	6^{4}
(France) G Simon	7	7
(France) N Mahut	2	6^{7}
Q	(Russia) T Gabashvili	6	7

Quarterfinals
(Italy) A Seppi	3	2
(Sweden) R Söderling	6	6
(France) G Simon	6	6
Q	(Russia) T Gabashvili	3	2

Semifinals
(Sweden) R Söderling	6	6
(France) G Simon	2	1

=== Bottom half ===
First round
5	(Czech Republic) T Berdych	6	6
(Croatia) I Ljubičić	3	3
(Croatia) I Karlović	6	6
(Belgium) O Rochus	1	2
Q	(Germany) M Zverev	7	7
(Germany) P Kohlschreiber	5	5
(Italy) S Bolelli	4	5
3	(Spain) D Ferrer	6	7
6	(United Kingdom) A Murray	5	3
WC	(Netherlands) R Haase	7	6
Q	(Germany) M Bachinger	3	2
(Germany) M Berrer	6	6
WC	(Netherlands) R Sluiter	1	6^{8}
(France) M Llodra	6	7
Q	(Czech Republic) J Hernych	3	3
2	(Russia) N Davydenko	6	6

Second round
5	(Czech Republic) T Berdych	4	4
(Croatia) I Karlović	6	6
Q	(Germany) M Zverev	6	7
3	(Spain) D Ferrer	2	5
WC	(Netherlands) R Haase	5	6	6
(Germany) M Berrer	7	3	3
(France) M Llodra	6	7
2	(Russia) N Davydenko	3	5

Quarterfinals
(Croatia) I Karlović	6	6
Q	(Germany) M Zverev	3	1
WC	(Netherlands) R Haase	6^{5}	6^{5}
(France) M Llodra	7	7

Semifinals
(Croatia) I Karlović	5	6^{4}
(France) M Llodra	7	7
