= 2013 ABN AMRO World Tennis Tournament – Doubles =

Doubles
- 2013 ABN AMRO World Tennis Tournament

Final
- Champions: (Sweden) Robert Lindstedt (Serbia) Nenad Zimonjić
- Runners-up: (Netherlands) Thiemo de Bakker (Netherlands) Jesse Huta Galung
- Score: 5–7, 6–3, [10–8]

Events
Singles	Doubles
← 2012 ·	ABN AMRO World Tennis Tournament	· 2014 →

Michaël Llodra and Nenad Zimonjić were the defending champions but decided not to participate together.
Llodra was scheduled to play alongside Juan Martín del Potro but withdrew from the first round while Zimonjić partnered up with Robert Lindstedt and successfully defended the title, defeating Thiemo de Bakker and Jesse Huta Galung in the final 5–7, 6–3, [10–8].

== Seeds ==
1. (Spain) Marcel Granollers / (Spain) Marc López (semifinals)
2. (Pakistan) Aisam-ul-Haq Qureshi / (Netherlands) Jean-Julien Rojer (first round)
3. (Sweden) Robert Lindstedt / (Serbia) Nenad Zimonjić (champions)
4. (Poland) Mariusz Fyrstenberg / (Poland) Marcin Matkowski (semifinals)

== Draw ==
=== Key ===
- Q = Qualifier
- WC = Wild card
- LL = Lucky loser
- Alt = Alternate
- SE = Special exempt
- PR = Protected ranking
- ITF = ITF entry
- JE = Junior exempt
- w/o = Walkover
- r = Retired
- d = Defaulted
- SR = Special ranking

=== Draw ===
First round
1	(Spain) M Granollers (Spain) M López	7^{7}	6
(India) R Bopanna (United States) R Ram	6^{2}	3
(Austria) J Knowle (Slovakia) F Polášek	7^{7}	6
(Cyprus) M Baghdatis (Bulgaria) G Dimitrov	6^{4}	1
3	(Sweden) R Lindstedt (Serbia) N Zimonjić	4	6	[15]
(United States) E Butorac (Australia) P Hanley	6	3	[13]
Alt	(Netherlands) S Fransen (Netherlands) W Koolhof	6	1	[2]
(United Kingdom) C Fleming (United Kingdom) J Marray	4	6	[10]
(Philippines) TC Huey (United Kingdom) D Inglot	4	5
Alt	(Poland) J Janowicz (Finland) J Nieminen	6	7
(France) B Paire (France) G Simon	6^{4}	6	[5]
4	(Poland) M Fyrstenberg (Poland) M Matkowski	7^{7}	3	[10]
WC	(Netherlands) T de Bakker (Netherlands) J Huta Galung	2	6	[10]
WC	(Netherlands) R Haase (Netherlands) I Sijsling	6	3	[3]
(France) J Benneteau (France) R Gasquet	7	6
2	(Pakistan) A-u-H Qureshi (Netherlands) J-J Rojer	5	2

Quarterfinals
1	(Spain) M Granollers (Spain) M López	6	6
(Austria) J Knowle (Slovakia) F Polášek	2	4
3	(Sweden) R Lindstedt (Serbia) N Zimonjić	4	0
(United Kingdom) C Fleming (United Kingdom) J Marray	6	1^{r}
Alt	(Poland) J Janowicz (Finland) J Nieminen	6	5	[8]
4	(Poland) M Fyrstenberg (Poland) M Matkowski	4	7	[10]
WC	(Netherlands) T de Bakker (Netherlands) J Huta Galung	6	3	[10]
(France) J Benneteau (France) R Gasquet	4	6	[7]

Semifinals
1	(Spain) M Granollers (Spain) M López	2	6^{10}
3	(Sweden) R Lindstedt (Serbia) N Zimonjić	6	7^{12}
4	(Poland) M Fyrstenberg (Poland) M Matkowski	4	5
WC	(Netherlands) T de Bakker (Netherlands) J Huta Galung	6	7

Final
3	(Sweden) R Lindstedt (Serbia) N Zimonjić	5	6	[10]
WC	(Netherlands) T de Bakker (Netherlands) J Huta Galung	7	3	[8]
