= 2013 ABN AMRO World Tennis Tournament – Singles =

Singles
- 2013 ABN AMRO World Tennis Tournament

Final
- Champion: (Argentina) Juan Martín del Potro
- Runner-up: (France) Julien Benneteau
- Score: 7–6^{(7–2)}, 6–3

Details
- Draw: 32 (4 Q / 3 WC )
- Seeds: 8

Events
Singles	Doubles
- ABN AMRO World Tennis Tournament

Roger Federer was the defending champion, but lost in the quarterfinals to Julien Benneteau.
Juan Martín del Potro won the title, defeating Benneteau in the final 7–6^{(7–2)}, 6–3.

== Seeds ==
1. (Switzerland) Roger Federer (quarterfinals)
2. (Argentina) Juan Martín del Potro (champion)
3. (France) Jo-Wilfried Tsonga (first round)
4. (France) Richard Gasquet (second round)
5. (France) Gilles Simon (semifinals)
6. (Italy) Andreas Seppi (first round)
7. (Poland) Jerzy Janowicz (first round)
8. (Germany) Florian Mayer (first round)

== Draw ==
Key

- Q = Qualifier
- WC = Wild card
- LL = Lucky loser
- Alt = Alternate
- ITF = ITF entry
- PR = Protected ranking
- SR = Special ranking
- SE = Special exempt
- JE = Junior exempt
- JR = Junior Accelerator Programme entrant
- CO = College Accelerator Programme entrant
- NG = Next Gen Accelerator Program entrant
- w/o = Walkover
- r = Retired
- d = Defaulted

=== Finals ===
Semifinals
(France) Julien Benneteau	6	7^{7}
5	(France) Gilles Simon	4	6^{2}
(Bulgaria) Grigor Dimitrov	4	4
2	(Argentina) Juan Martín del Potro	6	6

Final
(France) Julien Benneteau	6^{2}	3
2	(Argentina) Juan Martín del Potro	7^{7}	6

=== Top half ===
First round
1	(Switzerland) R Federer	6	6
(Slovenia) G Žemlja	3	1
(Russia) M Youzhny	6	6^{2}	1^{r}
WC	(Netherlands) T de Bakker	3	7^{7}	4
(France) J Benneteau	6	6
LL	(Germany) T Kamke	3	2
(Romania) V Hănescu	7^{7}	6
7	(Poland) J Janowicz	6^{4}	3
3	(France) J-W Tsonga	6^{3}	6	4
WC	(Netherlands) I Sijsling	7^{7}	4	6
(Slovakia) M Kližan	6	3	7
(France) P-H Mathieu	4	6	5
Q	(Italy) M Viola	5	6	6
(Spain) M Granollers	7	3	1
Q	(Germany) D Brands	6^{3}	4
5	(France) G Simon	7^{7}	6

Second round
1	(Switzerland) R Federer	6	6
WC	(Netherlands) T de Bakker	3	4
(France) J Benneteau	6	6
(Romania) V Hănescu	1	3
WC	(Netherlands) I Sijsling	2	4
(Slovakia) M Kližan	6	6
Q	(Italy) M Viola	3	1
5	(France) G Simon	6	6

Quarterfinals
1	(Switzerland) R Federer	3	5
(France) J Benneteau	6	7
(Slovakia) M Kližan	7^{8}	3	0^{r}
5	(France) G Simon	6^{6}	6	3

Semifinals
(France) J Benneteau	6	7^{7}
5	(France) G Simon	4	6^{2}

=== Bottom half ===
First round
8	(Germany) F Mayer	3	2
(Russia) N Davydenko	6	6
(Australia) B Tomic	3	6	3
(Bulgaria) G Dimitrov	6	3	6
(France) B Paire	0	7^{7}	0^{r}
(Cyprus) M Baghdatis	6	6^{3}	4
(Serbia) V Troicki	6^{3}	1
4	(France) R Gasquet	7^{7}	6
6	(Italy) A Seppi	3	4
Q	(Germany) M Bachinger	6	6
(Finland) J Nieminen	6	6
(Belgium) D Goffin	0	0
Q	(Latvia) E Gulbis	6	6
(Netherlands) R Haase	2	1
WC	(France) G Monfils	3	4
2	(Argentina) JM del Potro	6	6

Second round
(Russia) N Davydenko	5	3
(Bulgaria) G Dimitrov	7	6
(Cyprus) M Baghdatis	6	6
4	(France) R Gasquet	4	4
Q	(Germany) M Bachinger	3	7	3
(Finland) J Nieminen	6	5	6
Q	(Latvia) E Gulbis	6^{5}	3
2	(Argentina) JM del Potro	7^{7}	6

Quarterfinals
(Bulgaria) G Dimitrov	6^{4}	7^{7}	6
(Cyprus) M Baghdatis	7^{7}	6^{0}	3
(Finland) J Nieminen	3	4
2	(Argentina) JM del Potro	6	6

Semifinals
(Bulgaria) G Dimitrov	4	4
2	(Argentina) JM del Potro	6	6

== Qualifying ==
=== Seeds ===
1. (Japan) Tatsuma Ito (first round, retired)
2. (Germany) Tobias Kamke (qualifying competition, lucky loser)
3. (Germany) Daniel Brands (qualified)
4. (Austria) Andreas Haider-Maurer (first round)
5. (Ukraine) Sergiy Stakhovsky (first round)
6. (United States) Rajeev Ram (qualifying competition)
7. (France) Josselin Ouanna (qualifying competition)
8. (Russia) Dmitry Tursunov (first round)

=== Qualifiers ===
1. (Italy) Matteo Viola
2. (Latvia) Ernests Gulbis
3. (Germany) Daniel Brands
4. (Germany) Matthias Bachinger

=== Lucky losers ===
1. (Germany) Tobias Kamke

=== Draw ===
==== First qualifier ====
First round
1	(Japan) Tatsuma Ito	3	0^{r}
(Italy) Matteo Viola	6	1
WC	(Netherlands) Jesse Huta Galung	1	6	6
8	(Russia) Dmitry Tursunov	6	3	3

Qualifying competition
(Italy) Matteo Viola	7^{7}	6
WC	(Netherlands) Jesse Huta Galung	6^{4}	2

==== Second qualifier ====
First round
2	(Germany) Tobias Kamke	5	6	7
(Switzerland) Marco Chiudinelli	7	2	5
(Latvia) Ernests Gulbis	6	6
5	(Ukraine) Sergiy Stakhovsky	3	4

Qualifying competition
2	(Germany) Tobias Kamke	1	4
(Latvia) Ernests Gulbis	6	6

==== Third qualifier ====
First round
3	(Germany) Daniel Brands	6	7^{7}
(Kazakhstan) Mikhail Kukushkin	2	6^{2}
WC	(Netherlands) Fabian van der Lans	7	1	1
6	(United States) Rajeev Ram	5	6	6

Qualifying competition
3	(Germany) Daniel Brands	7^{10}	6
6	(United States) Rajeev Ram	6^{8}	4

==== Fourth qualifier ====
First round
4	(Austria) Andreas Haider-Maurer	3	7	4
(Germany) Matthias Bachinger	6	5	6
WC	(Netherlands) Matwé Middelkoop	3	1
7	(France) Josselin Ouanna	6	6

Qualifying competition
(Germany) Matthias Bachinger	4	7^{9}	6
7	(France) Josselin Ouanna	6	6^{7}	4
