= Rotterdam Open =

Coordinates: 51.883°N 4.49°E

ABN AMRO Open

ATP Tour
- Tour: ATP Tour
- Founded: 1972; 54 years ago
- Editions: 53 (2026)
- Location: Rotterdam, Netherlands
- Venue: Rotterdam Ahoy
- Category: ATP Tour 500
- Surface: Hard (Indoor) (1999–present); Deco-Turf (2009–2012); Proflex (2013–2018); Greenset (2019); Proflex (2020)
- Draw: 32S / 16Q / 16D
- Prize money: €2,462,660 (2026)
- Website: abnamro-open.nl

Current champions (2026)
- Singles: (Australia) Alex de Minaur
- Doubles: (Italy) Simone Bolelli (Italy) Andrea Vavassori

The Rotterdam Open, also known as the ABN AMRO Open for sponsorship reasons, is a professional men's tennis tournament played on indoor hard courts. It is part of the ATP Tour 500 series on the ATP Tour and has been held annually at Rotterdam Ahoy in Rotterdam, Netherlands.

== History ==
The first Rotterdam Open tennis tournament was held in November 1972 and was won by Arthur Ashe. The following year the tournament was not organized because it switched to a March date. Originally the Rotterdam Open was an event of the World Championship Tennis circuit and, in 1978, became part of the Grand Prix tennis circuit. Since 1990, it has been part of the ATP Tour.

In 1984, the singles final between Ivan Lendl and Jimmy Connors was interrupted in the 2nd set (6–0, 1–0) because the Ahoy Arena had received an anonymous telephone bomb threat. The police evacuated the stands and searched the venue but no bomb was found. The match was not resumed as Lendl was not prepared to play on and officially has no winner.

Since 2004, former Dutch tennis player Richard Krajicek has been the tournament director.

A record 115,894 people attended the 2012 edition tournament when Roger Federer returned for the first time in seven years. This record was broken in 2018 when 120,000 fans attended after Federer accepted a wildcard into the event after a five-year absence. It was called the ABN AMRO World Tennis Tournament (until 2022).

== Past finals ==
In the singles, Arthur Ashe (1972, 1975–76) and Roger Federer (2005, 2012 and 2018) hold the record for most titles with three, while Ashe, Stefan Edberg (1986–87), Nicolas Escudé (2001–02), Robin Söderling (2010–11) and Gaël Monfils (2019–20) co-hold the record for most consecutive titles with two. Federer (2001, 2005, 2012, and 2018) and Jimmy Connors (1978, 1981–82, and 1984) co-hold the record for most finals contested at four.

In the doubles, Anders Järryd (1987, 1991, 1993, 1995), Nenad Zimonjić (2009–10, 2012–13) and Nicolas Mahut (2014, 2016, 2018, 2020) co-hold the record for most titles with four, while Frew McMillan holds the record for most back-to-back titles with three straight wins (1974–76).

=== Singles ===
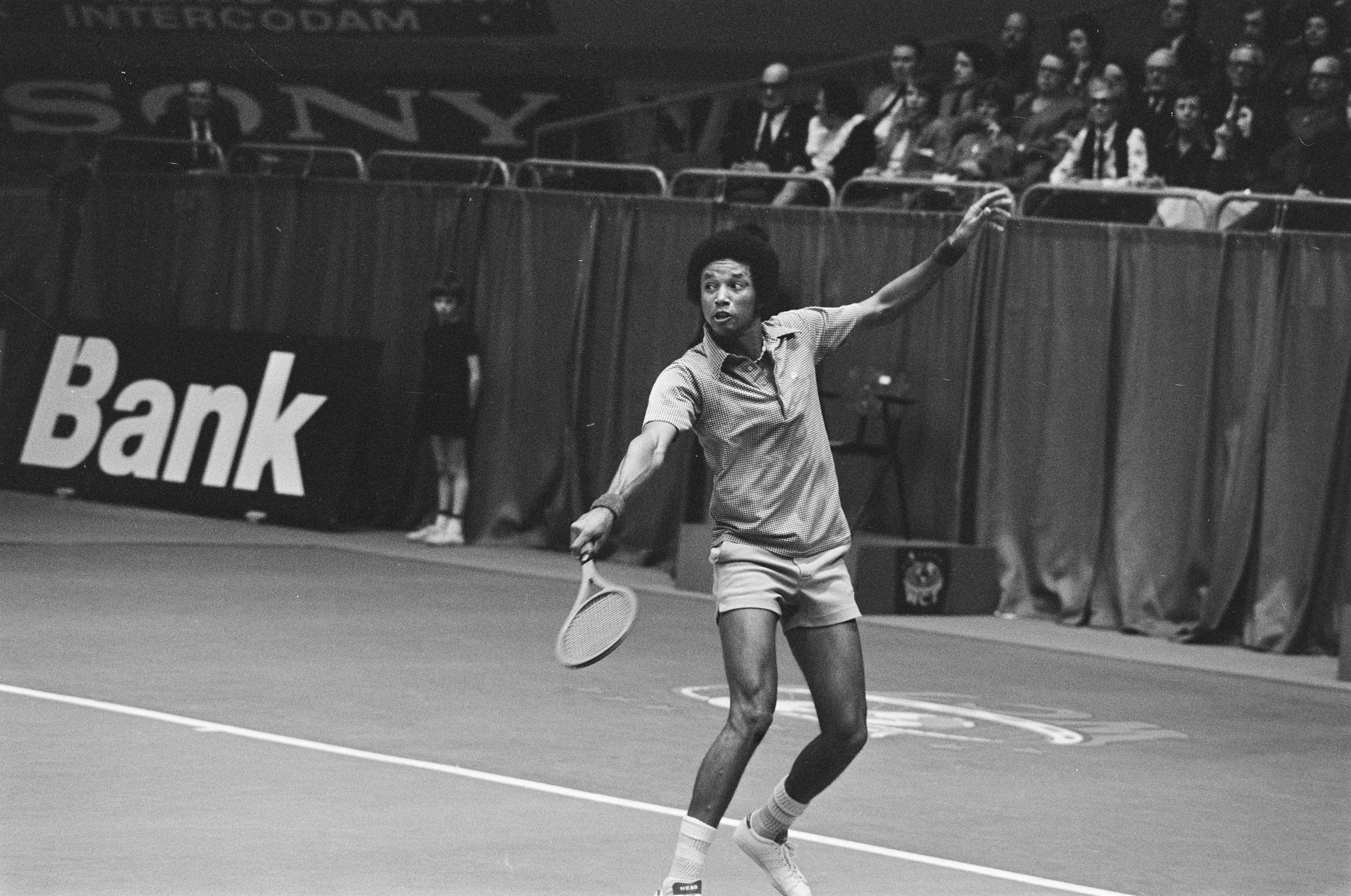
Arthur Ashe (pictured here during the 1975 tournament) holds the joint-record for most singles titles with three wins (1972, 1975–76).

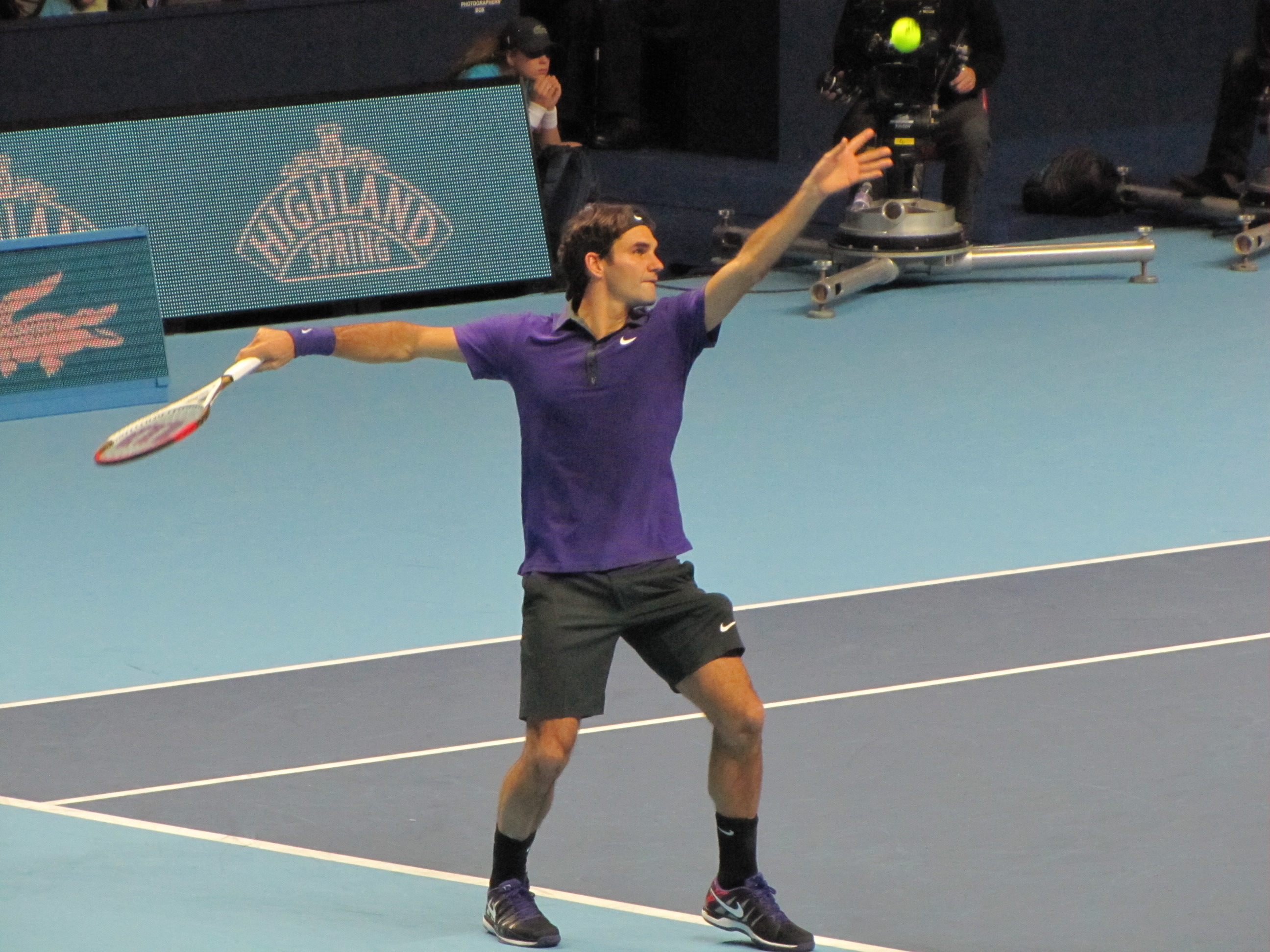
Roger Federer holds the joint-record for most singles titles with three wins (2005, 2012, and 2018).

Year	Champions	Runners-up	Score
↓ WCT circuit ↓
1972	(United States) Arthur Ashe	(Netherlands) Tom Okker	3–6, 6–2, 6–1
1973	Not Held		
1974	(Netherlands) Tom Okker	(United States) Tom Gorman	3–6, 7–6^{(7–2)}, 6–1
1975	(United States) Arthur Ashe (2)	(Netherlands) Tom Okker	3–6, 6–2, 6–4
1976	(United States) Arthur Ashe (3)	(United States) Robert Lutz	6–3, 6–3
1977	(United States) Dick Stockton	(Romania) Ilie Năstase	2–6, 6–3, 6–3
↓ Grand Prix circuit ↓
1978	(United States) Jimmy Connors	(Mexico) Raúl Ramírez	7–5, 7–5
1979	(Sweden) Björn Borg	(United States) John McEnroe	6–4, 6–2
1980	(Switzerland) Heinz Günthardt	(United States) Gene Mayer	6–2, 6–4
1981	(United States) Jimmy Connors (2)	(United States) Gene Mayer	6–1, 2–6, 6–2
1982	(Argentina) Guillermo Vilas	(United States) Jimmy Connors	0–6, 6–2, 6–4
1983	(United States) Gene Mayer	(Argentina) Guillermo Vilas	6–1, 7–6
1984	No winner	(Czechoslovakia) Ivan Lendl and (United States) Jimmy Connors	6–0, 1–0; Final abandoned
1985	(Czechoslovakia) Miloslav Mečíř	(Switzerland) Jakob Hlasek	6–1, 6–2
1986	(Sweden) Joakim Nyström	(Sweden) Anders Järryd	6–0, 6–3
1987	(Sweden) Stefan Edberg	(United States) John McEnroe	3–6, 6–3, 6–1
1988	(Sweden) Stefan Edberg (2)	(Czechoslovakia) Miloslav Mečíř	7–6, 6–2
1989	(Switzerland) Jakob Hlasek	(Sweden) Anders Järryd	6–1, 7–5
↓ ATP Tour 250 (Note: Known as World Series from 1990 till 1999.) ↓
1990	(United States) Brad Gilbert	(Sweden) Jonas Svensson	6–1, 6–3
1991	(Italy) Omar Camporese	(Czechoslovakia) Ivan Lendl	3–6, 7–6^{(7–4)}, 7–6^{(7–4)}
1992	(Germany) Boris Becker	(Commonwealth of Independent States) Alexander Volkov	7–6^{(11–9)}, 4–6, 6–2
1993	(Sweden) Anders Järryd	(Czech Republic) Karel Nováček	6–3, 7–5
1994	(Germany) Michael Stich	(South Africa) Wayne Ferreira	4–6, 6–3, 6–0
1995	(Netherlands) Richard Krajicek	(Netherlands) Paul Haarhuis	7–6^{(7–5)}, 6–4
1996	(Croatia) Goran Ivanišević	(Russia) Yevgeny Kafelnikov	6–4, 3–6, 6–3
1997	(Netherlands) Richard Krajicek (2)	(Czech Republic) Daniel Vacek	7–6^{(7–4)}, 7–6^{(7–5)}
1998	(Netherlands) Jan Siemerink	(Sweden) Thomas Johansson	7–6^{(7–2)}, 6–2
↓ ATP Tour 500 (Note: Known as Championship Series from 1990 till 1999 and International Series Gold from 2000 till 2008.) ↓
1999	(Russia) Yevgeny Kafelnikov	(United Kingdom) Tim Henman	6–2, 7–6^{(7–3)}
2000	(France) Cédric Pioline	(United Kingdom) Tim Henman	6–7^{(3–7)}, 6–4, 7–6^{(7–4)}
2001	(France) Nicolas Escudé	(Switzerland) Roger Federer	7–5, 3–6, 7–6^{(7–5)}
2002	(France) Nicolas Escudé (2)	(United Kingdom) Tim Henman	3–6, 7–6^{(9–7)}, 6–4
2003	(Belarus) Max Mirnyi	(Netherlands) Raemon Sluiter	7–6^{(7–3)}, 6–4
2004	(Australia) Lleyton Hewitt	(Spain) Juan Carlos Ferrero	6–7^{(1–7)}, 7–5, 6–4
2005	(Switzerland) Roger Federer	(Croatia) Ivan Ljubičić	5–7, 7–5, 7–6^{(7–5)}
2006	(Czech Republic) Radek Štěpánek	(Belgium) Christophe Rochus	6–0, 6–3
2007	(Russia) Mikhail Youzhny	(Croatia) Ivan Ljubičić	6–2, 6–4
2008	(France) Michaël Llodra	(Sweden) Robin Söderling	6–7^{(3–7)}, 6–3, 7–6^{(7–4)}
2009	(United Kingdom) Andy Murray	(Spain) Rafael Nadal	6–3, 4–6, 6–0
2010	(Sweden) Robin Söderling	(Russia) Mikhail Youzhny	6–4, 2–0, retired
2011	(Sweden) Robin Söderling (2)	(France) Jo-Wilfried Tsonga	6–3, 3–6, 6–3
2012	(Switzerland) Roger Federer (2)	(Argentina) Juan Martín del Potro	6–1, 6–4
2013	(Argentina) Juan Martín del Potro	(France) Julien Benneteau	7–6^{(7–2)}, 6–3
2014	(Czech Republic) Tomáš Berdych	(Croatia) Marin Čilić	6–4, 6–2
2015	(Switzerland) Stan Wawrinka	(Czech Republic) Tomáš Berdych	4–6, 6–3, 6–4
2016	(Slovakia) Martin Kližan	(France) Gaël Monfils	6–7^{(1–7)}, 6–3, 6–1
2017	(France) Jo-Wilfried Tsonga	(Belgium) David Goffin	4–6, 6–4, 6–1
2018	(Switzerland) Roger Federer (3)	(Bulgaria) Grigor Dimitrov	6–2, 6–2
2019	(France) Gaël Monfils	(Switzerland) Stan Wawrinka	6–3, 1–6, 6–2
2020	(France) Gaël Monfils (2)	(Canada) Félix Auger-Aliassime	6–2, 6–4
2021	(Russia) Andrey Rublev	(Hungary) Márton Fucsovics	7–6^{(7–4)}, 6–4
2022	(Canada) Félix Auger-Aliassime	(Greece) Stefanos Tsitsipas	6–4, 6–2
2023	Daniil Medvedev	(Italy) Jannik Sinner	5–7, 6–2, 6–2
2024	(Italy) Jannik Sinner	(Australia) Alex de Minaur	7–5, 6–4
2025	(Spain) Carlos Alcaraz	(Australia) Alex de Minaur	6–4, 3–6, 6–2
2026	(Australia) Alex de Minaur	(Canada) Félix Auger-Aliassime	6–3, 6–2

=== Doubles ===
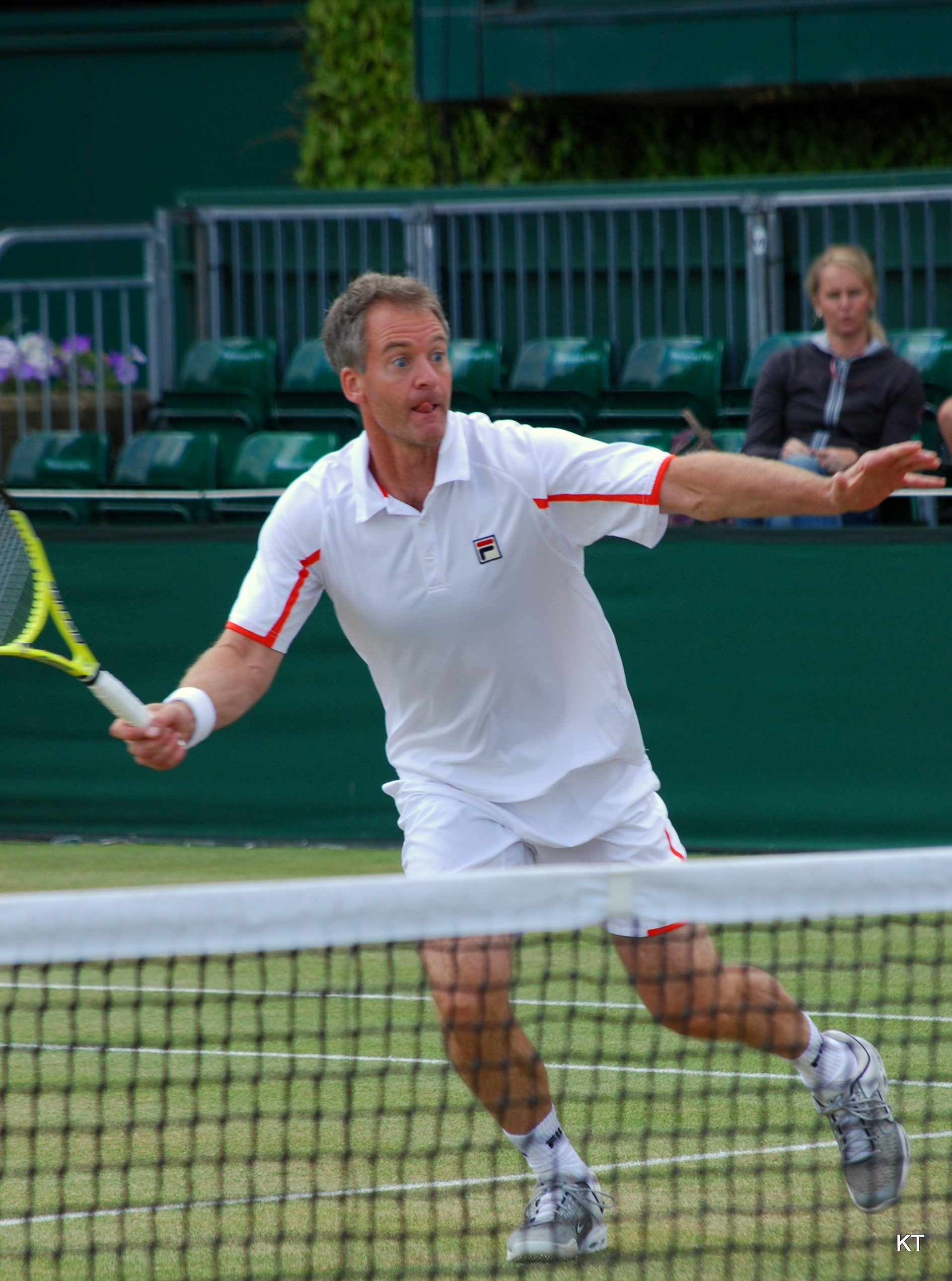
Anders Järryd was the first player to take four doubles titles in Rotterdam (1987, 1991, 1993, 1995).

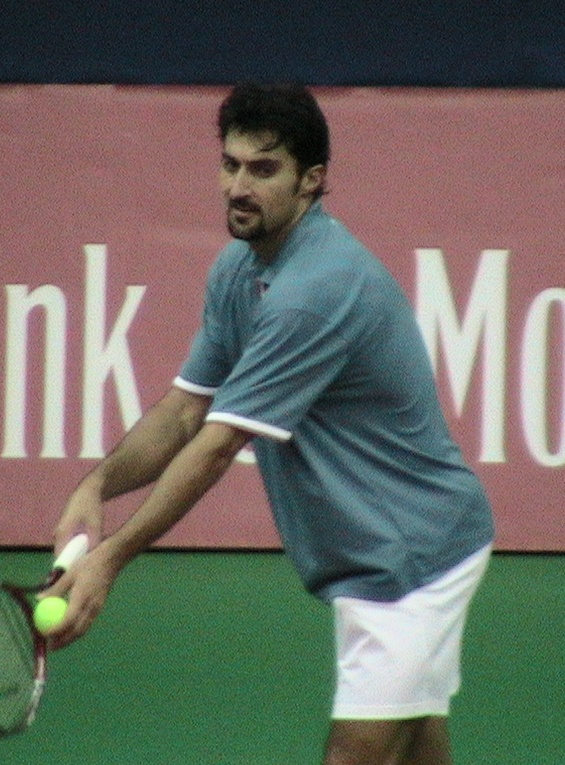
Nenad Zimonjić reached five consecutive finals (2009–13), winning a record four times (2009–10, 2012–13).

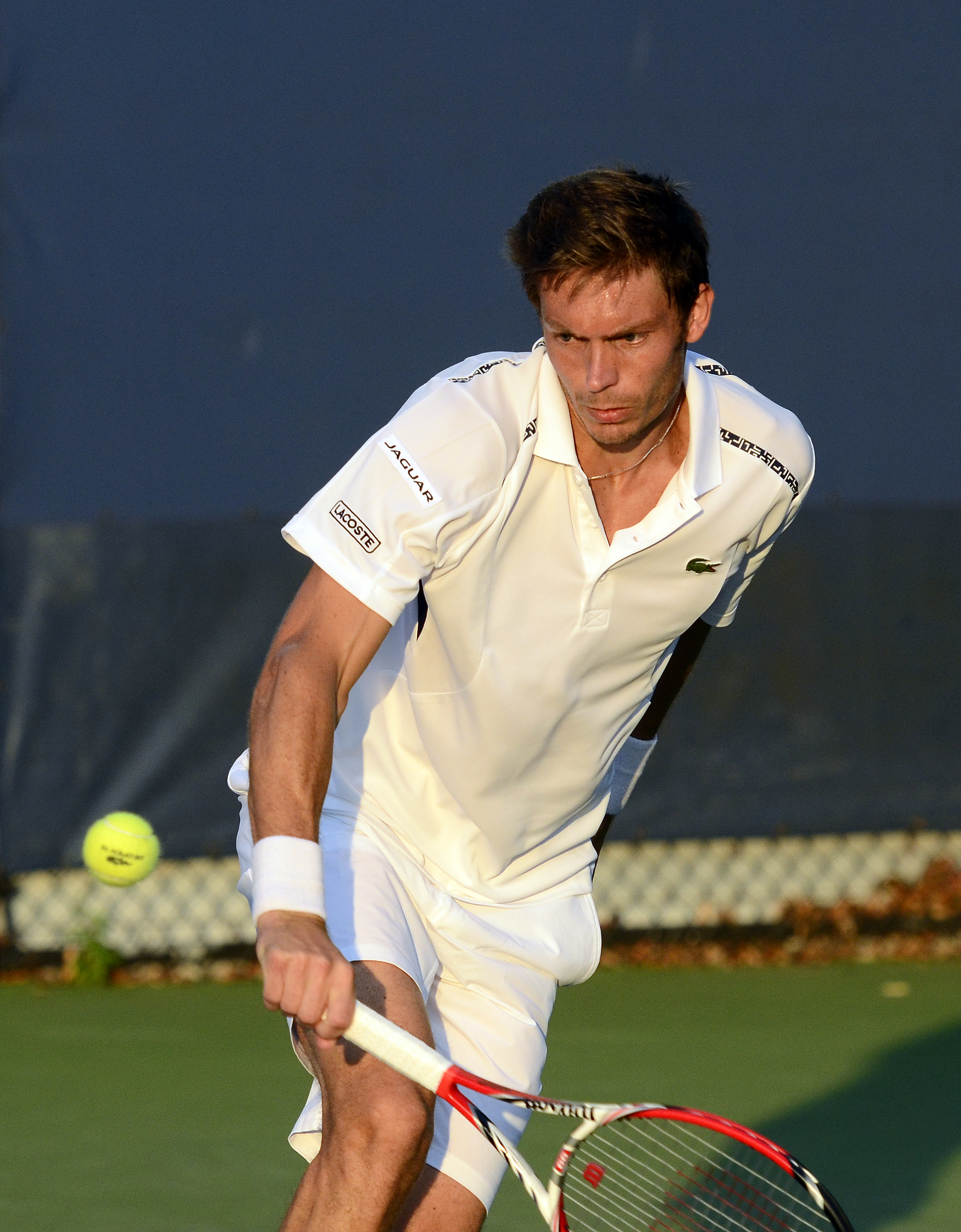
Nicolas Mahut also won the title four times (2014, 2016, 2018, 2020).

Year	Champions	Runners-up	Score
↓ WCT circuit ↓
1972	(Australia) Roy Emerson (Australia) John Newcombe	(United States) Arthur Ashe (United States) Robert Lutz	6–2, 6–3
1973	Not Held		
1974	(South Africa) Bob Hewitt (South Africa) Frew McMillan	(France) Pierre Barthès (Romania) Ilie Năstase	3–6, 6–4, 6–3
1975	(South Africa) Bob Hewitt (2) (South Africa) Frew McMillan (2)	(Spain) José Higueras (Hungary) Balázs Taróczy	6–2, 6–2
1976	(Australia) Rod Laver (South Africa) Frew McMillan (3)	(United States) Arthur Ashe (Netherlands) Tom Okker	6–1, 6–7^{(4–7)}, 7–6^{(7–5)}
1977	(Poland) Wojciech Fibak (Netherlands) Tom Okker	(India) Vijay Amritraj (United States) Dick Stockton	6–4, 6–4
↓ Grand Prix circuit ↓
1978	(United States) Fred McNair (Mexico) Raúl Ramírez	(United States) Robert Lutz (United States) Stan Smith	6–2, 6–3
1979	(United States) Peter Fleming (United States) John McEnroe	(Switzerland) Heinz Günthardt (South Africa) Bernard Mitton	6–4, 6–4
1980	(India) Vijay Amritraj (United States) Stan Smith	(United States) Bill Scanlon (United States) Brian Teacher	6–4, 6–3
1981	(United States) Fritz Buehning (United States) Ferdi Taygan	(United States) Gene Mayer (United States) Sandy Mayer	7–6, 1–6, 6–4
1982	(Australia) Mark Edmondson (United States) Sherwood Stewart	(United States) Fritz Buehning (United States) Kevin Curren	7–5, 6–2
1983	(United States) Fritz Buehning (2) (United States) Tom Gullikson	(United States) Peter Fleming (Czechoslovakia) Pavel Složil	7–6, 4–6, 7–6
1984	(United States) Kevin Curren (Poland) Wojciech Fibak (2)	(United States) Fritz Buehning (United States) Ferdi Taygan	6–4, 6–4
1985	(Czechoslovakia) Tomáš Šmíd (Czechoslovakia) Pavel Složil	(United States) Vitas Gerulaitis (Australia) Paul McNamee	6–4, 6–4
1986	(Sweden) Stefan Edberg (Socialist Federal Republic of Yugoslavia) Slobodan Živojinović	(Poland) Wojciech Fibak (United States) Matt Mitchell	2–6, 6–3, 6–2
1987	(Sweden) Stefan Edberg (2) (Sweden) Anders Järryd	(United States) Chip Hooper (United States) Mike Leach	3–6, 6–3, 6–4
1988	(Germany) Patrik Kühnen (Germany) Tore Meinecke	(Sweden) Magnus Gustafsson (Italy) Diego Nargiso	7–6, 7–6
1989	(Czechoslovakia) Miloslav Mečíř (Czechoslovakia) Milan Šrejber	(Sweden) Jan Gunnarsson (Sweden) Magnus Gustafsson	7–6, 6–0
↓ ATP Tour 250 ↓
1990	(Mexico) Leonardo Lavalle (Mexico) Jorge Lozano	(Italy) Diego Nargiso (Venezuela) Nicolás Pereira	6–3, 7–6
1991	(United States) Patrick Galbraith (Sweden) Anders Järryd (2)	(United States) Steve DeVries (Australia) David Macpherson	7–6, 6–2
1992	(Germany) Marc-Kevin Goellner (Germany) David Prinosil	(Netherlands) Paul Haarhuis (Netherlands) Mark Koevermans	6–2, 6–7, 7–6
1993	(Sweden) Henrik Holm (Sweden) Anders Järryd (3)	(South Africa) David Adams (Russia) Andrei Olhovskiy	6–4, 7–6
1994	(United Kingdom) Jeremy Bates (Sweden) Jonas Björkman	(Netherlands) Jacco Eltingh (Netherlands) Paul Haarhuis	6–4, 6–1
1995	(Czech Republic) Martin Damm (Sweden) Anders Järryd (4)	(Spain) Tomás Carbonell (Spain) Francisco Roig	6–3, 6–2
1996	(South Africa) David Adams (South Africa) Marius Barnard	(Netherlands) Hendrik Jan Davids (Czech Republic) Cyril Suk	6–3, 5–7, 7–6
1997	(Netherlands) Jacco Eltingh (Netherlands) Paul Haarhuis	(Belgium) Libor Pimek (South Africa) Byron Talbot	7–6^{(7–5)}, 6–4
1998	(Netherlands) Jacco Eltingh (2) (Netherlands) Paul Haarhuis (2)	(United Kingdom) Neil Broad (South Africa) Piet Norval	7–6, 6–3
↓ ATP Tour 500 ↓
1999	(South Africa) David Adams (2) (South Africa) John-Laffnie de Jager	(United Kingdom) Neil Broad (Australia) Peter Tramacchi	6–7^{(5–7)}, 6–3, 6–4
2000	(South Africa) David Adams (3) (South Africa) John-Laffnie de Jager (2)	(United Kingdom) Tim Henman (Russia) Yevgeny Kafelnikov	5–7, 6–2, 6–3
2001	(Sweden) Jonas Björkman (2) (Switzerland) Roger Federer	(Czech Republic) Petr Pála (Czech Republic) Pavel Vízner	6–3, 6–0
2002	(Switzerland) Roger Federer (2) (Belarus) Max Mirnyi	(The Bahamas) Mark Knowles (Canada) Daniel Nestor	4–6, 6–3, [10–4]
2003	(Australia) Wayne Arthurs (Australia) Paul Hanley	(Switzerland) Roger Federer (Belarus) Max Mirnyi	7–6^{(7–4)}, 6–2
2004	(Australia) Paul Hanley (2) (Czech Republic) Radek Štěpánek	(Israel) Jonathan Erlich (Israel) Andy Ram	5–7, 7–6^{(7–5)}, 7–5
2005	(Israel) Jonathan Erlich (Israel) Andy Ram	(Czech Republic) Cyril Suk (Czech Republic) Pavel Vízner	6–4, 4–6, 6–3
2006	(Australia) Paul Hanley (3) (Zimbabwe) Kevin Ullyett	(Israel) Jonathan Erlich (Israel) Andy Ram	7–6^{(7–4)}, 7–6^{(7–2)}
2007	(Czech Republic) Martin Damm (2) (India) Leander Paes	(Romania) Andrei Pavel (Germany) Alexander Waske	6–3, 6–7^{(5–7)}, [10–7]
2008	(Czech Republic) Tomáš Berdych (Russia) Dmitry Tursunov	(Germany) Philipp Kohlschreiber (Russia) Mikhail Youzhny	7–5, 3–6, [10–7]
2009	(Canada) Daniel Nestor (Serbia) Nenad Zimonjić	(Czech Republic) Lukáš Dlouhý (India) Leander Paes	6–2, 7–5
2010	(Canada) Daniel Nestor (2) (Serbia) Nenad Zimonjić (2)	(Sweden) Simon Aspelin (Australia) Paul Hanley	6–4, 4–6, [10–7]
2011	(Austria) Jürgen Melzer (Germany) Philipp Petzschner	(France) Michaël Llodra (Serbia) Nenad Zimonjić	6–4, 3–6, [10–5]
2012	(France) Michaël Llodra (Serbia) Nenad Zimonjić (3)	(Sweden) Robert Lindstedt (Romania) Horia Tecău	4–6, 7–5, [16–14]
2013	(Sweden) Robert Lindstedt (Serbia) Nenad Zimonjić (4)	(Netherlands) Thiemo de Bakker (Netherlands) Jesse Huta Galung	5–7, 6–3, [10–8]
2014	(France) Michaël Llodra (2) (France) Nicolas Mahut	(Netherlands) Jean-Julien Rojer (Romania) Horia Tecău	6–2, 7–6^{(7–4)}
2015	(Netherlands) Jean-Julien Rojer (Romania) Horia Tecău	(United Kingdom) Jamie Murray (Australia) John Peers	3–6, 6–3, [10–8]
2016	(France) Nicolas Mahut (2) (Canada) Vasek Pospisil	(Germany) Philipp Petzschner (Austria) Alexander Peya	7–6^{(7–2)}, 6–4
2017	(Croatia) Ivan Dodig (Spain) Marcel Granollers	(Netherlands) Wesley Koolhof (Netherlands) Matwe Middelkoop	7–6^{(7–5)}, 6–3
2018	(France) Pierre-Hugues Herbert (France) Nicolas Mahut (3)	(Austria) Oliver Marach (Croatia) Mate Pavić	2–6, 6–2, [10–7]
2019	(France) Jérémy Chardy (Finland) Henri Kontinen	(Netherlands) Jean-Julien Rojer (Romania) Horia Tecău	7–6^{(7–5)}, 7–6^{(7–4)}
2020	(France) Pierre-Hugues Herbert (2) (France) Nicolas Mahut (4)	(Finland) Henri Kontinen (Germany) Jan-Lennard Struff	7–6^{(7–5)}, 4–6, [10–7]
2021	(Croatia) Nikola Mektić (Croatia) Mate Pavić	(Germany) Kevin Krawietz (Romania) Horia Tecău	7–6^{(9–7)}, 6–2
2022	(Netherlands) Robin Haase (Netherlands) Matwé Middelkoop	(South Africa) Lloyd Harris (Germany) Tim Pütz	4–6, 7–6^{(7–5)}, [10–5]
2023	(Croatia) Ivan Dodig (2) (United States) Austin Krajicek	(India) Rohan Bopanna (Australia) Matthew Ebden	7–6^{(7–5)}, 2–6, [12–10]
2024	(Netherlands) Wesley Koolhof (Croatia) Nikola Mektić (2)	(Netherlands) Robin Haase (Netherlands) Botic van de Zandschulp	6–3, 7–5
2025	(Italy) Simone Bolelli (Italy) Andrea Vavassori	(Belgium) Sander Gillé (Poland) Jan Zieliński	6–2, 4–6, [10–6]
2026	(Italy) Simone Bolelli (2) (Italy) Andrea Vavassori (2)	(Chinese Taipei) Ray Ho (Germany) Hendrik Jebens	6–3, 6–4

Source: Past winners from official site

=== Single titles per country ===
Titels	Country
8	United States
7	Sweden
7	France
6	Switzerland
4	Netherlands
3	Russia
3	Czechoslovakia; Czech Republic
2	Argentina
2	Germany
2	Italy
2	Australia
1	Croatia
1	Belarus
1	United Kingdom
1	Slovakia
1	Canada
1	Spain

(until 2026)

== Tour history ==
Since its inception in 1972 the Rotterdam Open has been part of three major tennis circuits: WCT circuit (1972–1977), Grand Prix circuit (1978–1989) and ATP Tour (1990–present).

- 1972–1977: WCT circuit
- 1978–1989: Grand Prix circuit
- 1990–1998: ATP World Series
- 1999–present: ATP Tour 500

== Sponsors ==
- ABN AMRO – main sponsor
- Rotterdam Ahoy – licence holder
