= 2008 Rafael Nadal tennis season =

Statistics for Spanish tennis player

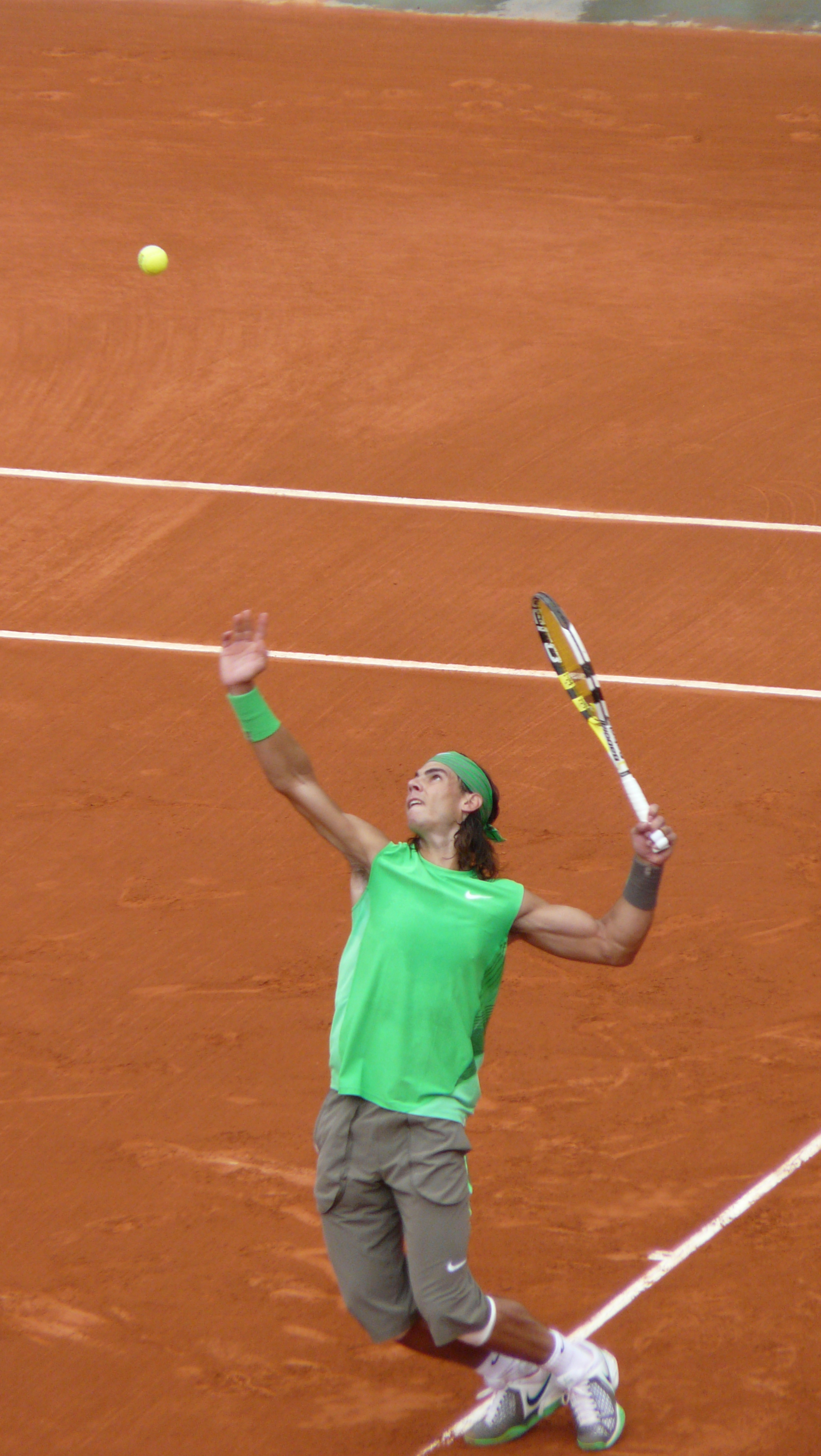
- Rafael Nadal at the 2008 French Open.
- Full name: Rafael "Rafa" Nadal Parera
- Country: Spain
- Calendar prize money: $6,773,776 (Singles $6,659,994, Doubles $113,782)

Singles
- Season record: 82–11
- Calendar titles: 8
- Year-end ranking: No. 1
- Ranking change from previous year: ▲1

Grand Slam & significant results
- Australian Open: SF
- French Open: W
- Wimbledon: W
- US Open: SF
- Other tournaments
- Olympic Games: Gold Medal

Doubles
- Season record: 11–7
- Calendar titles: 1
- Year-end ranking: No. 110
- Ranking change from previous year: ▲10

Davis Cup
- Davis Cup: W

The 2008 Rafael Nadal tennis season officially began on January 1 with the start of the 2008 ATP Tour. This season is considered to be one of Nadal's best: he won eight titles in 2008, including two majors and the Olympic gold medal. In addition, Nadal also won three Masters titles — Monte-Carlo, Hamburg, and Toronto. Nadal's 32-match winning streak in 2008 is the longest across three surfaces in tennis history. He won the French Open for the loss of no sets and just 41 games, in one of the most comprehensive major performances of all time. Nadal also won Wimbledon, defeating rival and five-time defending champion Roger Federer in what is widely recognized as the greatest tennis match in history. He then won the Olympic gold medal at Beijing, which clinched the world No. 1 ranking for the first time. He ascended to the top spot after 160 consecutive weeks as the world No. 2. Nadal would hold the No. 1 ranking for the rest of the season and finish the year ranked No. 1 for the first time in his career.

== Year summary ==
Nadal kickstarted his season with a runner-up showing at the Indian city of Chennai. He then played the first Grand Slam of the year, the Australian Open. Nadal raced through the tournament before a shock straight-sets loss at the hands of Frenchman Jo-Wilfried Tsonga in the semifinals. Nadal then had a form slump, winning just three of his next five, and six of his next nine matches. Nadal had his second runner-up result that year at Miami, losing to long-term rival Nikolay Davydenko. Nadal then won his fourth consecutive Monte-Carlo Masters title, losing just 29 games in 5 matches. He followed that up with his second tournament win of the year at the Barcelona Open Banco Sabadell. Nadal's winning streak of 10 matches was snapped when compatriot Juan Carlos Ferrero stunned him in the second round of the Rome Masters, where Nadal was a three-time defending champion. Nadal then regrouped and began a 32-match winning streak across clay, grass, and hard courts, which is the longest streak on three surfaces in the history of the sport. He won his first Hamburg Masters title in May, and followed it up with a brilliant performance to win his fourth consecutive French Open title, losing just 4 games in the final. Nadal's streak continued with his first grass-court title at Queen's Club in London, and then his first-ever Wimbledon, where he outlasted Federer in what is considered the greatest match in tennis history. Nadal then won his third Masters title and first hard-court title of the year at Toronto. His streak was finally ended in the semifinals of the Cincinnati Masters by Novak Djokovic. Nadal then entered the Summer Olympics at Beijing, and became the first top-5 ranked player to win the Olympic Gold in the history of the sport. This win also catapulted Nadal to the top of the rankings for the first time in his career. Nadal then made his second hard-court Grand Slam semifinal at the US Open, before losing to Andy Murray in four tight sets. He then helped guide Spain into the Davis Cup Final, notching up wins over Sam Querrey and Andy Roddick. Nadal ended the year as World #1.

=== Spring hard-court season ===
==== Chennai Open ====
Nadal began the year by participating in the Chennai Open in Chennai, India. Nadal defeated Carlos Moyá in the semi-finals in (at the time) the longest three-set match in history, 6–7(3), 7–6(8), 7–6(1), lasting three hours and fifty-four minutes. An exhausted Nadal went on to lose in the finals to Mikhail Youzhny 6–0, 6–1.

==== Australian Open ====
Nadal played his second tournament of the year at the Australian Open. Nadal stormed through the tournament, dropping no sets until he was shocked by the then world number 38 Jo-Wilfried Tsonga in the semi-finals. He beat Viktor Troicki in the first round 7–6(3), 7–5, 6–1. He then demolished Frenchman Florent Serra, 6–0, 6–2, 6–2. In the third round, he defeated another Frenchman, Gilles Simon, 7–5, 6–2, 6–3. In the round of 16, he beat his third Frenchman of the tournament, Paul-Henri Mathieu, after Mathieu retired when he was down 4–6, 0–3. In the quarter-finals, he beat Jarkko Nieminen, 7–5, 6–3, 6–1. Nadal's impressive run came to a halt when Frenchman Jo-Wilfried Tsonga comprehensively beat him in the semi-finals 6–2, 6–3, 6–2.

==== ABN AMRO World Tennis Tournament ====
Nadal then participated in his first indoor tournament of the year at the Rotterdam Open, Netherlands. Nadal beat Dmitry Tursunov 6–4, 6–4 in the first round before squandering a one-set lead to lose 6–3, 3–6, 4–6 to Italian Andreas Seppi.

==== Dubai Tennis Championships ====
Nadal then returned to the Dubai Open, where he was a former champion. Nadal had won the title by beating Roger Federer in the 2006 Dubai Open, 2–6, 6–4, 6–4. This time around, however, his performance was less than impressive as he lost in the quarter-finals to American World No. 6 Andy Roddick. Nadal looked uncomfortable in his first-round match against Philipp Kohlschreiber, recovering from a one-set deficit to win 3–6, 6–1, 6–4. He then proceeded to push aside World No. 171 Mikhail Ledovskikh 6–4, 6–0, before losing to Roddick in the quarters, 6–7(5), 2–6.

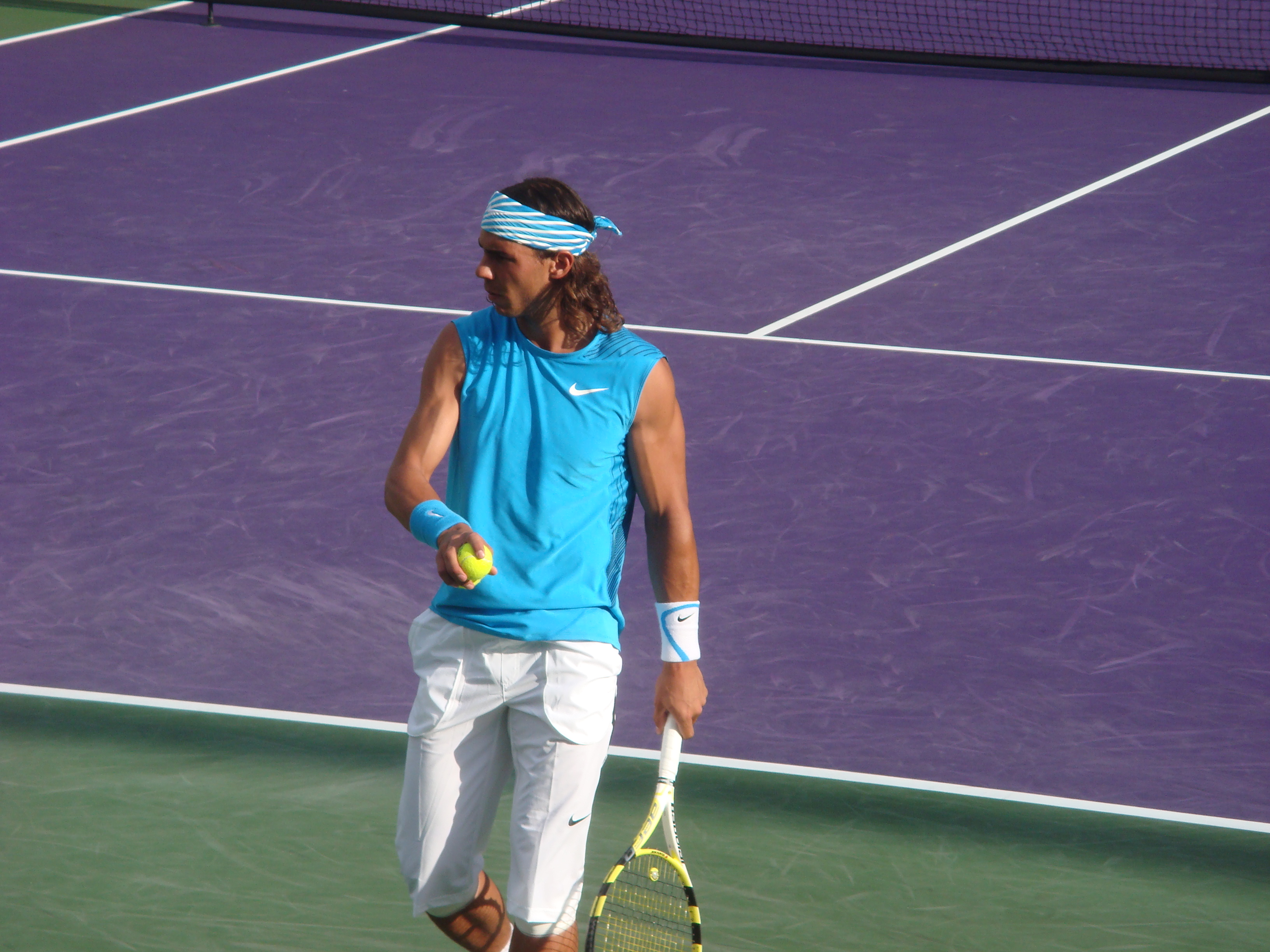
Rafael Nadal at the 2008 Sony Ericsson Open

==== Pacific Life Open ====
In the first Masters Series event of the year, Nadal put in a consistent performance to reach the semi-finals. He beat Colombian Santiago Giraldo in the second round 6–3, 6–3, before defeating American Donald Young 6–1, 6–3 in the third round. Nadal then defeated Jo-Wilfried Tsonga in a rematch of their Australian Open semi-final match-up. Nadal stuttered for a while but regrouped to exact revenge on his opponent, 6–7(4), 7–6(3), 7–5. Nadal then defeated World No. 9 James Blake in the quarter-finals in three sets – 7–5, 3–6, 6–3. In the semi-finals, he fell to World No. 3 and the man he beat in the previous year's final, Novak Djokovic, 3–6, 2–6.

==== Sony Ericsson Open ====
Nadal reached the final of Miami Masters for the second time in his career. He defeated German Benjamin Becker 7–5, 6–2 in the second round, followed by the demolition of another German, Nicolas Kiefer in the third round 6–2, 6–4. Nadal defeated James Blake for the second time in two weeks in the quarter-finals, and then beat big-hitting Czech Tomáš Berdych in the semi-finals, 7–6(6), 6–2. Nadal finally fell to long-time rival and the only man with a positive head-to-head against him (minimum 5 matches), Nikolay Davydenko, 4–6, 2–6.

Nadal then defeated Kiefer again at the Davis Cup World Group quarterfinals, 7–6(5), 6–0, 6–3.

=== European clay-court season ===
==== Monte-Carlo Rolex Masters ====
Nadal was back on the surface of his choice, red clay. A magnificent run on the red clay would set him up for the great year he had. Nadal won his fourth consecutive Monte Carlo Masters title. He lost just 29 games in 5 matches he played. Nadal received a bye into the second round, where he routed Croatian Mario Ančić 6–0, 6–3. Nadal then defeated fellow Spaniard and former World No. 1 Juan Carlos Ferrero in the second round, 6–4, 6–1. In the quarterfinals, Nadal beat World No. 5 David Ferrer 6–1, 7–5. Nadal then squandered just 5 games in a comprehensive defeat of Russian Nikolay Davydenko, before defeating long-time rival Roger Federer 7–5, 7–5 in the final to win his tenth Masters title.

==== Open Sabadell Atlántico Barcelona ====
Nadal entered the Barcelona Open as the top seed for the first time in a tournament that year. Nadal stormed through the tournament losing just one set, and extended his winning streak to 10. He defeated a succession of top-50 players up to the semifinals, including Potito Starace, compatriot Feliciano López and Argentine Juan Ignacio Chela. He then thrashed World No. 85 Denis Gremelmayr, 6–1, 6–0, before winning the trophy by defeating David Ferrer for the second time in two weeks, 6–1, 4–6, 6–1.

==== Internazionali BNL d'Italia ====
Nadal entered the Italian capital as a three-time defending champion. However, he fell in the second round to Juan Carlos Ferrero, 5–7, 1–6. This loss snapped his winning streak of 16 in the Italian capital.

==== Hamburg Masters ====
Nadal won for the first time at the German city of Hamburg, flagging off his 32-match winning streak which would continue on till the Cincinnati Masters in August. Nadal beat Potito Starace in the second round for the second time that month. He then won a lopsided third-round match against future Grand Slam champion Andy Murray before defeating Carlos Moyá for the second time that season, 6–1, 6–3. Nadal then had two tough matches back-to-back, but came out on top on both occasions. He beat World No. 3 Novak Djokovic 7–5, 2–6, 6–2 in the semifinals. In the finals, he avenged his loss the previous year's championship match by beating Roger Federer, 7–5, 6–7(3), 6–3.

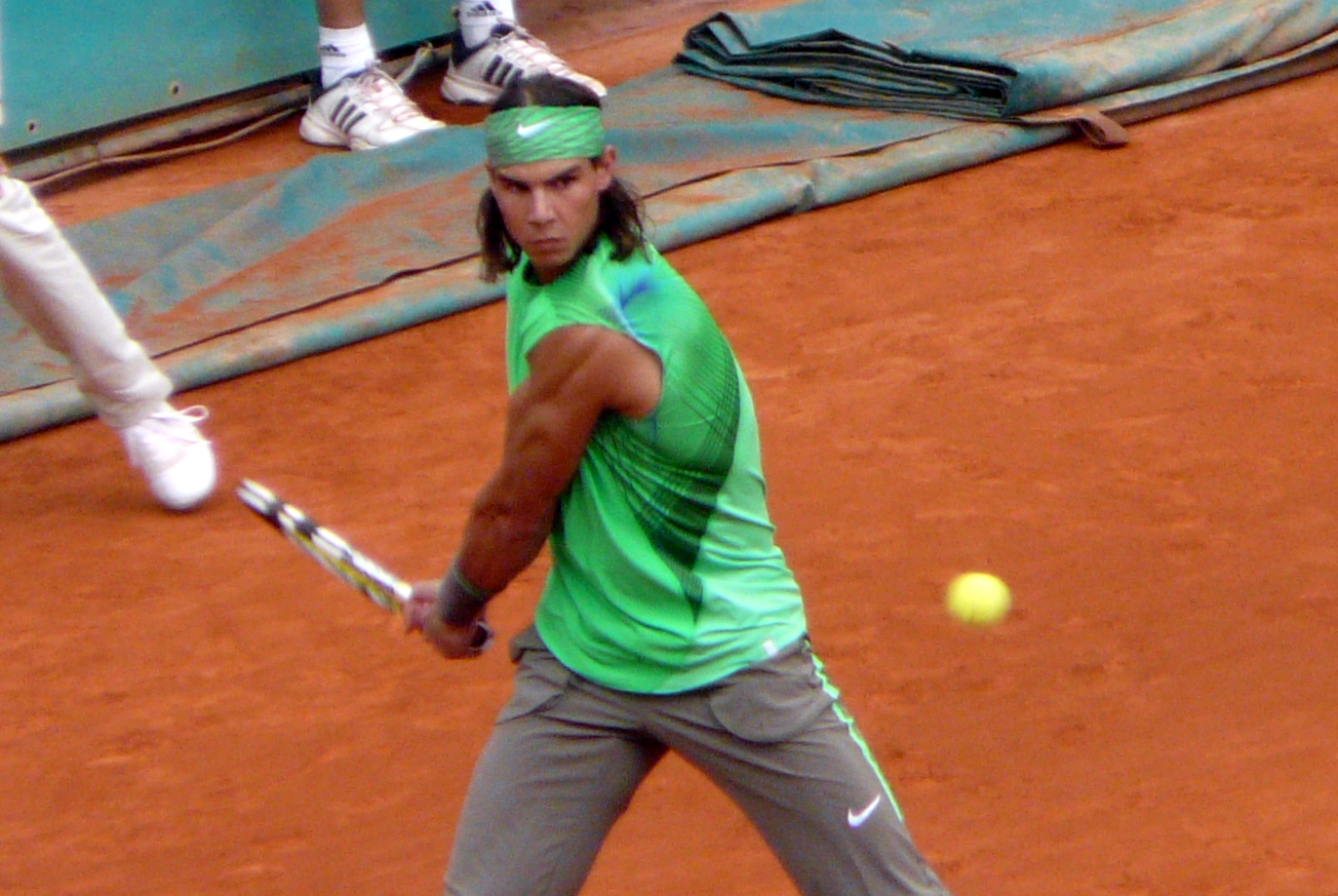
Nadal hits a backhand at the 2008 French Open

==== Roland Garros ====
Nadal then entered the French Open as a three-time defending champion. Nadal's 2008 French Open is considered one of the greatest Grand Slam performances of all time. Nadal won every single set he played in the tournament, and dropped just 41 games en route to his fourth consecutive French Open title. Nadal defeated Brazilian Thomaz Bellucci in the first round for the loss of 9 games. He then walked past Frenchman Nicolas Devilder in the second round, and then Finn Jarkko Nieminen in the third round, for the total loss of just 10 games. Nadal then thrashed two fellow Spaniards, Fernando Verdasco and Nicolás Almagro back-to-back for the loss of just 6 games. In the semifinals, Nadal played the toughest match of his tournament, defeating Novak Djokovic 6–4, 6–2, 7–6(3) to book his spot in the final. Nadal then proceeded to win one of the most lopsided finals in tennis history, routing World No. 1 Roger Federer for the third consecutive year, 6–1, 6–3, 6–0.

=== Grass court season ===
==== Queen's Club Championships ====
Nadal entered the Queen's Club tournament as a warm-up to Wimbledon. At the time, Nadal was riding a 12-match winning streak and by the end of the tournament, he would have lengthened the streak to 17. Nadal defeated Swede Jonas Björkman in the second round, before stumbling through his next two matches, beating Kei Nishikori in three sets in the third round and then 6'10 Ivo Karlović in three tie-break sets in the quarterfinals. Nadal then defeated another big server, Andy Roddick 7–5, 6–4 in the semifinals; finally winning his first ever grasscourt title by sidling past Novak Djokovic for the third time that year.

==== The Championships, Wimbledon ====
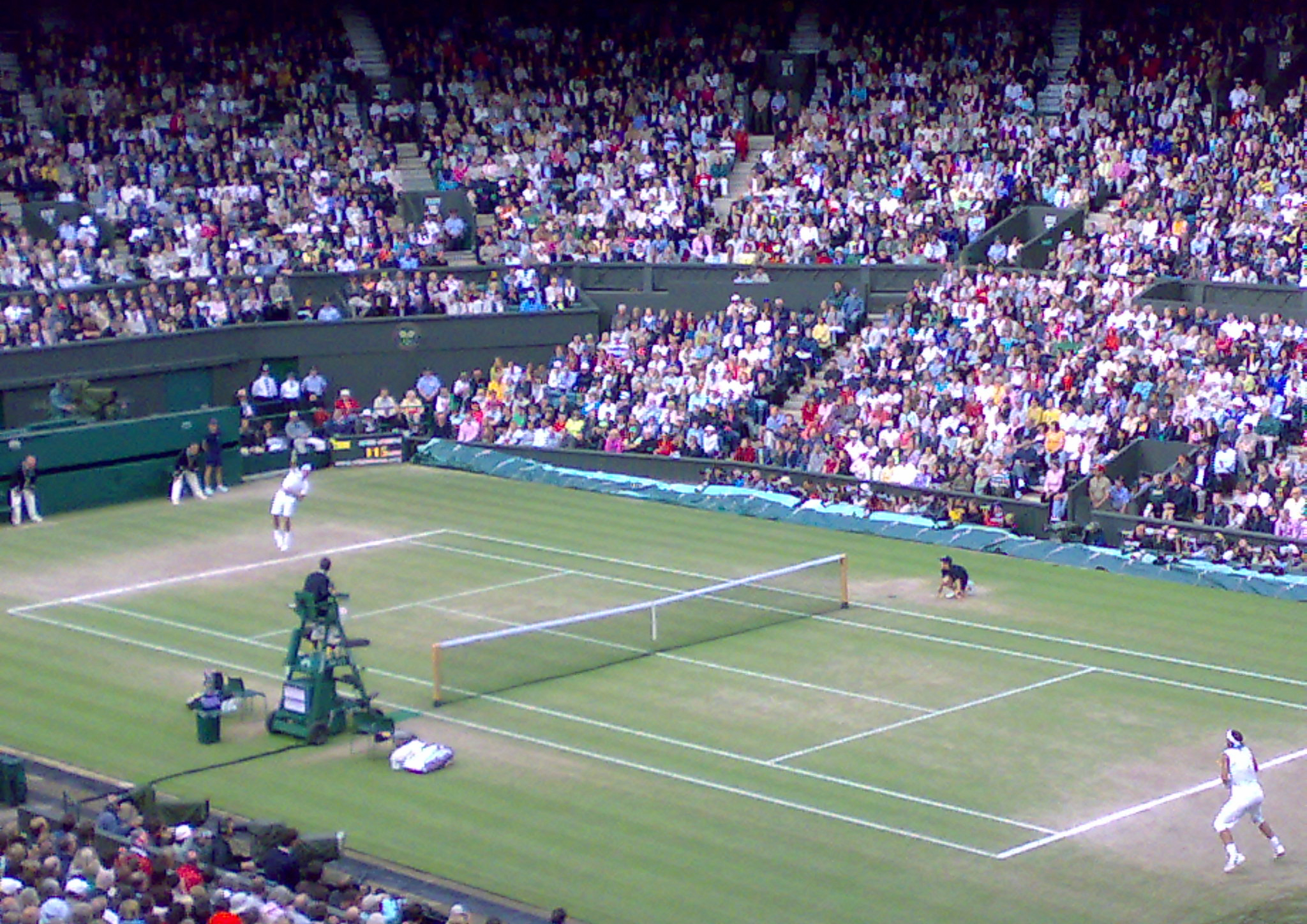
Wimbledon 2008 final, Federer serves for the third set

Nadal entered the 2008 Wimbledon Championships as the two-time runner-up. He was riding a winning streak of 17 matches. Nadal had lost the previous two finals to Roger Federer, including the 2007 Wimbledon final, which was considered to be one of the great matches in recent times. Nadal defeated German Andreas Beck in the first round. He then lost his first set of the tournament in a tight second-round match against Latvian Ernests Gulbis. Nadal stormed through the rest of the tournament, thrashing Nicolas Kiefer, 7–6(3), 6–2, 6–3, Russian Mikhail Youzhny, 6–3, 6–3, 6-1 and future Wimbledon Champion Andy Murray, 6–3, 6–2, 6–4. Nadal then defeated surprise semifinalist Rainer Schüttler 6–1, 7–6(3), 6–4 to set up a third consecutive Wimbledon final with 5-time defending champion Roger Federer. Nadal then played what is considered the greatest match in tennis history, defeating Federer in a 4-hour, 48-minute match, 6–4, 6–4, 6–7(5), 6–7(8), 9–7 in the longest Wimbledon final in history. The win gave Nadal his first Grand Slam outside the French Open, and his fifth Grand Slam overall. The match is notable for its long, well-crafted rallies and the clutch shots produced on crucial points. Federer saved two match points in the fourth-set tie-break, but eventually caved on Nadal's fourth match-point. The two greatest passing shots of the tournament were hit back-to-back late into the fourth-set tiebreak. Nadal hit a clutch forehand pass to set up match-point on his own serve. Federer responded with a backhand pass to save the match-point. Federer eventually closed out the set, but lost the match. Many experts agree this match set Nadal up to the great success that would ensue in the following months.

=== Summer hard-court season ===
==== Rogers Cup ====
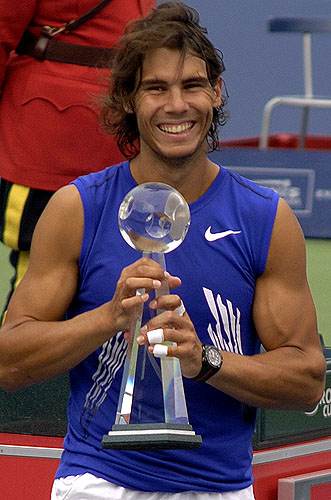
Nadal with the 2008 Rogers Cup trophy

Nadal rode his streak through the Toronto Masters event in Toronto, Canada. He received a bye into the second round where he routed home hope Jesse Levine, 6–4, 6–2. In the third round, Nadal thrashed Russian Igor Andreev 6–2, 7–6(1). Nadal then faced childhood rival Richard Gasquet in the quarterfinals. He lost the first set in an excruciatingly long tie-break, 6–7^{(12–14)}. However, he recovered immediately and pushed Gasquet aside by winning the next two sets 6–2, 6–1. In the semifinals, Nadal was matched up against up-and-comer Andy Murray. Nadal won 7–6, 6–3, reaching his third hard-court final of the year. The final was a contest between him and German Nicolas Kiefer. Nadal destroyed Kiefer 6–3, 6–2 to win his first hard-court title of the year and extend his streak to 29 match wins.

==== Western & Southern Financial Open ====
Nadal next played at the only Masters tournament he has never reached the final at, the Cincinnati Masters. He strode through the draw, demolishing Frenchman Florent Serra for the loss of just one game and then taking down former World No. 2 Tommy Haas, 6–2, 7–6(1). In the quarterfinals, Nadal beat Ecuadorian Nicolás Lapentti in the last win of his streak. It finally ended when World No. 3 Novak Djokovic defeated Nadal in the semifinals, 6–1, 7–5.

== Photos ==
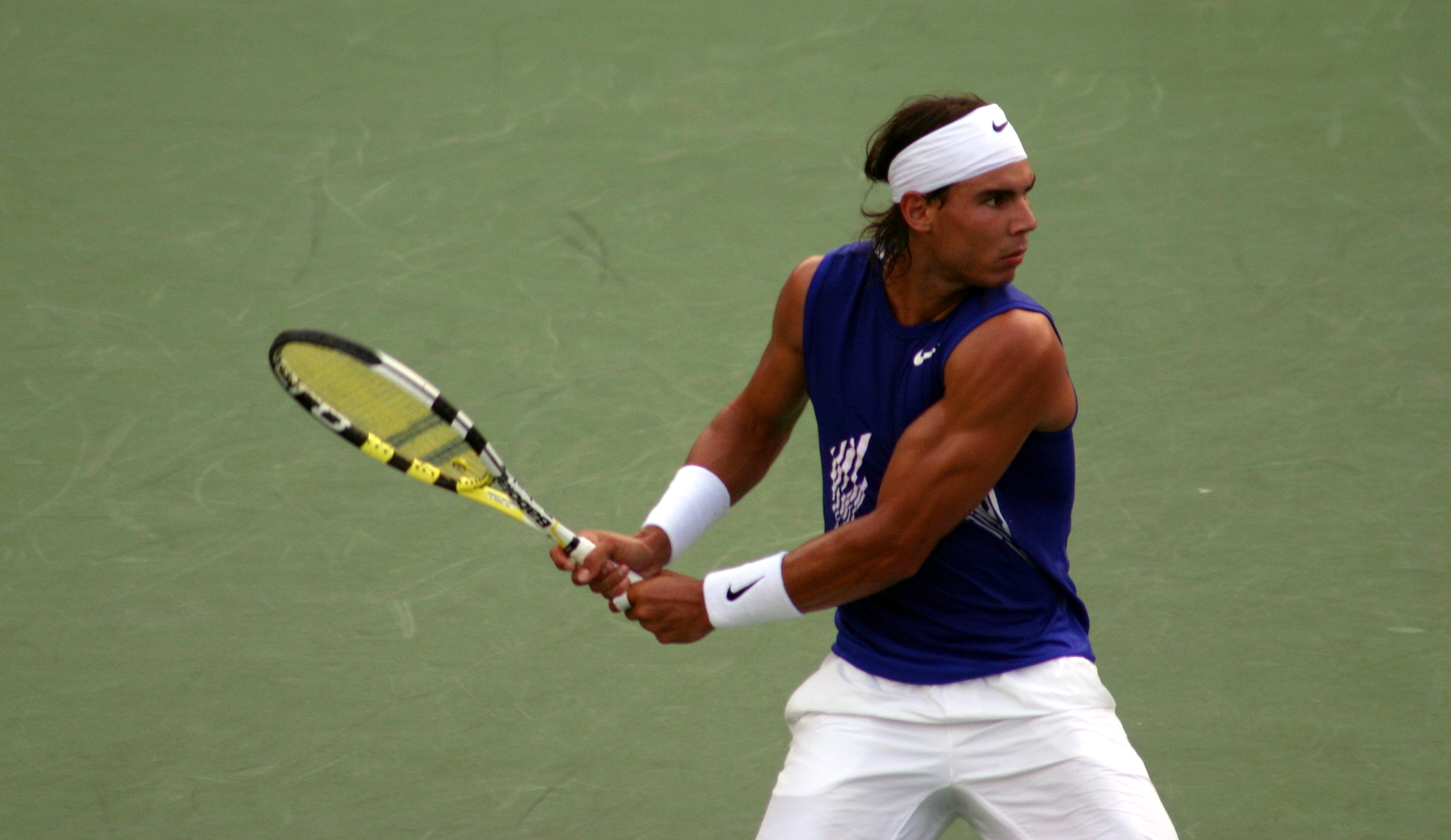
Rafael Nadal playing at the Cincinnati Masters in 2008.

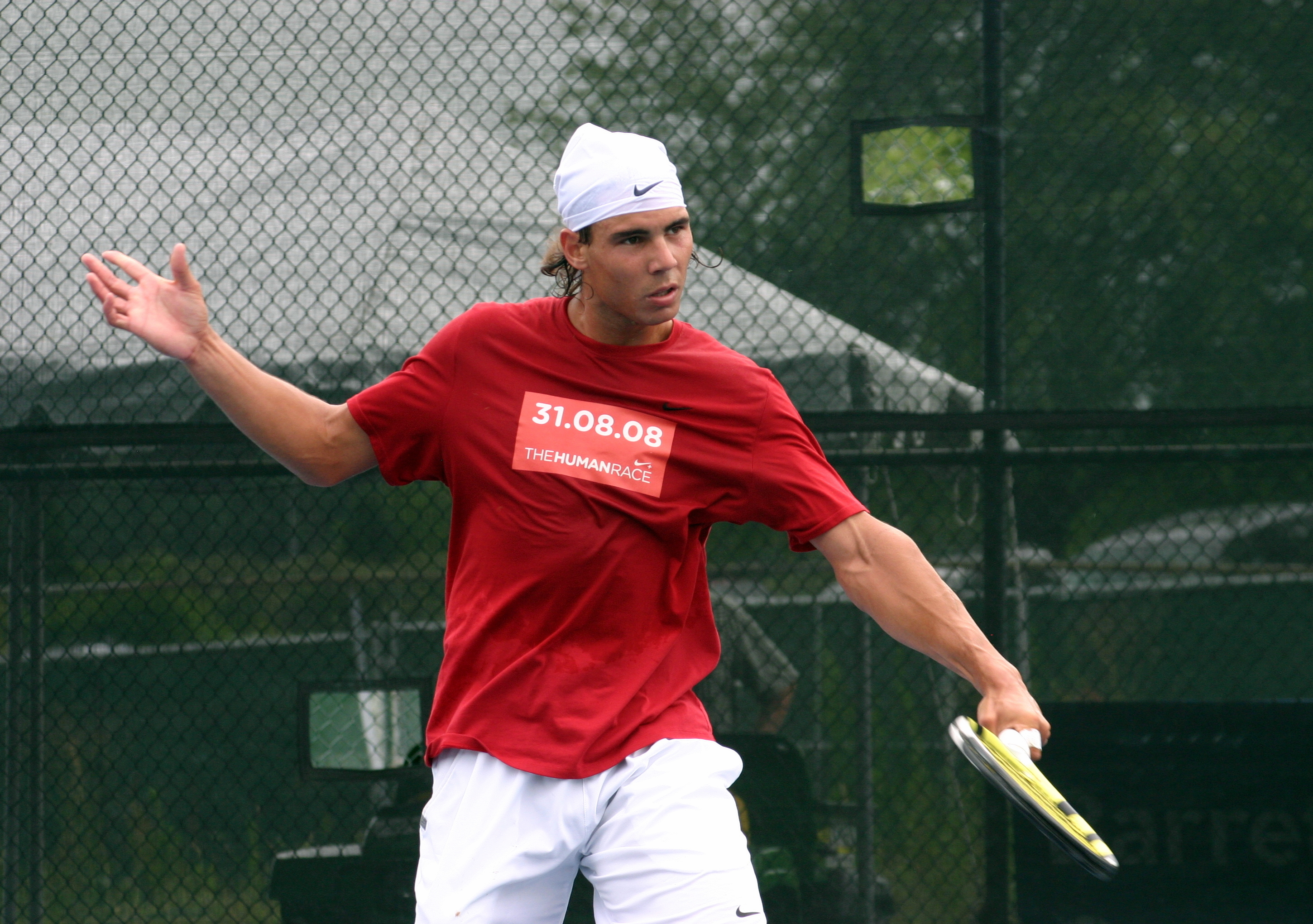
Rafael Nadal practicing at the Cincinnati Masters.

== All Matches ==
=== Singles matches ===
Tournament	Match	Round	Opponent	Rank	Result	Score
Chennai Open; Chennai, India; ATP World Tour 250; Hard, outdoor 31 December 2007 – 6 January 2008	1 / 320	1R	(France) Mathieu Montcourt	123	Win	6–2, 6–4
Chennai Open; Chennai, India; ATP World Tour 250; Hard, outdoor 31 December 2007 – 6 January 2008	2 / 321	2R	(United States) Rajeev Ram	253	Win	6–2, 6–1
Chennai Open; Chennai, India; ATP World Tour 250; Hard, outdoor 31 December 2007 – 6 January 2008	3 / 322	QF	(Spain) Guillermo García López	90	Win	6–3, 6–2
Chennai Open; Chennai, India; ATP World Tour 250; Hard, outdoor 31 December 2007 – 6 January 2008	4 / 323	SF	(Spain) Carlos Moyá	17	Win	6–7^{(3–7)}, 7–6^{(10–8)}, 7–6^{(7–1)}
Chennai Open; Chennai, India; ATP World Tour 250; Hard, outdoor 31 December 2007 – 6 January 2008	5 / 324	F	(Russia) Mikhail Youzhny	19	Loss (1)	0–6, 1–6
Australian Open; Melbourne, Australia; Grand Slam; Hard, outdoor 14–27 January 2008	6 / 325	1R	(Serbia) Viktor Troicki	126	Win	7–6^{(7–3)}, 6–3, 6–1
Australian Open; Melbourne, Australia; Grand Slam; Hard, outdoor 14–27 January 2008	7 / 326	2R	(France) Florent Serra	88	Win	6–0, 6–2, 6–2
Australian Open; Melbourne, Australia; Grand Slam; Hard, outdoor 14–27 January 2008	8 / 327	3R	(France) Gilles Simon	33	Win	7–5, 6–2, 6–3
Australian Open; Melbourne, Australia; Grand Slam; Hard, outdoor 14–27 January 2008	9 / 328	4R	(France) Paul-Henri Mathieu	25	Win	6–4, 3–0 RET
Australian Open; Melbourne, Australia; Grand Slam; Hard, outdoor 14–27 January 2008	10 / 329	QF	(Finland) Jarkko Nieminen	26	Win	7–5, 6–3, 6–1
Australian Open; Melbourne, Australia; Grand Slam; Hard, outdoor 14–27 January 2008	11 / 330	SF	(France) Jo-Wilfried Tsonga	38	Loss	2–6, 3–6, 2–6
ABN AMRO World Tennis Tournament; Rotterdam, Netherlands; ATP World Tour 500; Hard, indoor 18–24 February 2008	12 / 331	1R	(Russia) Dmitry Tursunov	33	Win	6–4, 6–4
ABN AMRO World Tennis Tournament; Rotterdam, Netherlands; ATP World Tour 500; Hard, indoor 18–24 February 2008	13 / 332	2R	(Italy) Andreas Seppi	42	Loss	6–3, 3–6, 4–6
Barclays Dubai Tennis Championships; Dubai, UAE; ATP World Tour 500; Hard, outdoor 3–9 March 2008	14 / 333	1R	(Germany) Philipp Kohlschreiber	27	Win	3–6, 6–1, 6–4
Barclays Dubai Tennis Championships; Dubai, UAE; ATP World Tour 500; Hard, outdoor 3–9 March 2008	15 / 334	2R	(Russia) Mikhail Ledovskikh	171	Win	6–4, 6–0
Barclays Dubai Tennis Championships; Dubai, UAE; ATP World Tour 500; Hard, outdoor 3–9 March 2008	16 / 335	QF	(United States) Andy Roddick	6	Loss	6–7^{(5–7)}, 2–6
Pacific Life Open; Indian Wells, United States; ATP World Tour Masters 1000; Hard, outdoor 13–19 March 2008	–	1R	Bye			
Pacific Life Open; Indian Wells, United States; ATP World Tour Masters 1000; Hard, outdoor 13–19 March 2008	17 / 336	2R	(Colombia) Santiago Giraldo	141	Win	6–3, 6–3
Pacific Life Open; Indian Wells, United States; ATP World Tour Masters 1000; Hard, outdoor 13–19 March 2008	18 / 337	3R	(United States) Donald Young	86	Win	6–1, 6–3
Pacific Life Open; Indian Wells, United States; ATP World Tour Masters 1000; Hard, outdoor 13–19 March 2008	19 / 338	4R	(France) Jo-Wilfried Tsonga	17	Win	6–7^{(4–7)}, 7–6^{(7–5)},7–5
Pacific Life Open; Indian Wells, United States; ATP World Tour Masters 1000; Hard, outdoor 13–19 March 2008	20 / 339	QF	(United States) James Blake	9	Win	7–5, 3–6, 6–3
Pacific Life Open; Indian Wells, United States; ATP World Tour Masters 1000; Hard, outdoor 13–19 March 2008	21 / 340	SF	(Serbia) Novak Djokovic	3	Loss	3–6, 2–6
Sony Ericsson Open; Miami, United States; ATP World Tour Masters 1000; Hard, outdoor 27 March – 9 April 2008	–	1R	Bye			
Sony Ericsson Open; Miami, United States; ATP World Tour Masters 1000; Hard, outdoor 27 March – 9 April 2008	22 / 341	2R	(Germany) Benjamin Becker	108	Win	7–5, 6–2
Sony Ericsson Open; Miami, United States; ATP World Tour Masters 1000; Hard, outdoor 27 March – 9 April 2008	23 / 342	3R	(Germany) Nicolas Kiefer	51	Win	6–2, 6–4
Sony Ericsson Open; Miami, United States; ATP World Tour Masters 1000; Hard, outdoor 27 March – 9 April 2008	24 / 343	4R	(France) Paul-Henri Mathieu	16	Win	6–4, 6–4
Sony Ericsson Open; Miami, United States; ATP World Tour Masters 1000; Hard, outdoor 27 March – 9 April 2008	25 / 344	QF	(United States) James Blake	9	Win	3–6, 6–3, 6–1
Sony Ericsson Open; Miami, United States; ATP World Tour Masters 1000; Hard, outdoor 27 March – 9 April 2008	26 / 345	SF	(Czech Republic) Tomáš Berdych	10	Win	7–6^{(8–6)}, 6–2
Sony Ericsson Open; Miami, United States; ATP World Tour Masters 1000; Hard, outdoor 27 March – 9 April 2008	27 / 346	F	(Russia) Nikolay Davydenko	4	Loss (2)	4–6, 2–6
Davis Cup, GER v/s ESP World Group Quarterfinals; Germany; Davis Cup; Hard, indoor 11 April 2008	28 / 347	QF	(Germany) Nicolas Kiefer	47	Win	7–6^{(7–5)}, 6–0, 6–3
Monte-Carlo Rolex Masters; Monte Carlo, Monaco; ATP World Tour Masters 1000; Clay, outdoor 20–26 April 2008	–	1R	Bye			
Monte-Carlo Rolex Masters; Monte Carlo, Monaco; ATP World Tour Masters 1000; Clay, outdoor 20–26 April 2008	29 / 348	2R	(Croatia) Mario Ančić	55	Win	6–0, 6–3
Monte-Carlo Rolex Masters; Monte Carlo, Monaco; ATP World Tour Masters 1000; Clay, outdoor 20–26 April 2008	30 / 349	3R	(Spain) Juan Carlos Ferrero	24	Win	6–4, 6–1
Monte-Carlo Rolex Masters; Monte Carlo, Monaco; ATP World Tour Masters 1000; Clay, outdoor 20–26 April 2008	31 / 350	QF	(Spain) David Ferrer	5	Win	6–1, 7–5
Monte-Carlo Rolex Masters; Monte Carlo, Monaco; ATP World Tour Masters 1000; Clay, outdoor 20–26 April 2008	32 / 351	SF	(Russia) Nikolay Davydenko	4	Win	6–3, 6–2
Monte-Carlo Rolex Masters; Monte Carlo, Monaco; ATP World Tour Masters 1000; Clay, outdoor 20–26 April 2008	33 / 352	F	(Switzerland) Roger Federer	1	Win (1)	7–5, 7–5
Open Sabadell Atlántico Barcelona; Barcelona, Spain; ATP World Tour 500; Clay, outdoor 28 April – 4 May 2008	–	1R	Bye			
Open Sabadell Atlántico Barcelona; Barcelona, Spain; ATP World Tour 500; Clay, outdoor 28 April – 4 May 2008	34 / 353	2R	(Italy) Potito Starace	45	Win	6–4, 6–2
Open Sabadell Atlántico Barcelona; Barcelona, Spain; ATP World Tour 500; Clay, outdoor 28 April – 4 May 2008	35 / 354	3R	(Spain) Feliciano López	35	Win	6–4, 6–3
Open Sabadell Atlántico Barcelona; Barcelona, Spain; ATP World Tour 500; Clay, outdoor 28 April – 4 May 2008	36 / 355	QF	(Argentina) Juan Ignacio Chela	37	Win	6–4, 6–2
Open Sabadell Atlántico Barcelona; Barcelona, Spain; ATP World Tour 500; Clay, outdoor 28 April – 4 May 2008	37 / 356	SF	(Germany) Denis Gremelmayr	85	Win	6–1, 6–0
Open Sabadell Atlántico Barcelona; Barcelona, Spain; ATP World Tour 500; Clay, outdoor 28 April – 4 May 2008	38 / 357	F	(Spain) David Ferrer	5	Win (2)	6–1, 4–6, 6–1
Internazionali BNL d'Italia; Rome, Italy; ATP World Tour Masters 1000; Clay, outdoor 5–11 May 2008	–	1R	Bye			
Internazionali BNL d'Italia; Rome, Italy; ATP World Tour Masters 1000; Clay, outdoor 5–11 May 2008	39 / 358	2R	(Spain) Juan Carlos Ferrero	23	Loss	5–7, 1–6
Masters Series Hamburg; Hamburg, Germany; ATP World Tour Masters 1000; Clay, outdoor 11–17 May 2008	–	1R	Bye			
Masters Series Hamburg; Hamburg, Germany; ATP World Tour Masters 1000; Clay, outdoor 11–17 May 2008	40 / 359	2R	(Italy) Potito Starace	45	Win	6–4, 7–6^{(8–6)}
Masters Series Hamburg; Hamburg, Germany; ATP World Tour Masters 1000; Clay, outdoor 11–17 May 2008	41 / 360	3R	(United Kingdom) Andy Murray	14	Win	6–3, 6–2
Masters Series Hamburg; Hamburg, Germany; ATP World Tour Masters 1000; Clay, outdoor 11–17 May 2008	42 / 361	QF	(Spain) Carlos Moyá	12	Win	6–1, 6–3
Masters Series Hamburg; Hamburg, Germany; ATP World Tour Masters 1000; Clay, outdoor 11–17 May 2008	43 / 362	SF	(Serbia) Novak Djokovic	3	Win	7–5, 2–6, 6–2
Masters Series Hamburg; Hamburg, Germany; ATP World Tour Masters 1000; Clay, outdoor 11–17 May 2008	44 / 363	F	(Switzerland) Roger Federer	1	Win (3)	7–5, 6–7^{(3–7)}, 6–3
French Open; Paris, France; Grand Slam; Clay, outdoor 25 May – 7 June 2008	45 / 364	1R	(Brazil) Thomaz Bellucci	76	Win	7–5, 6–3, 6–1
French Open; Paris, France; Grand Slam; Clay, outdoor 25 May – 7 June 2008	46 / 365	2R	(France) Nicolas Devilder	148	Win	6–4, 6–0, 6–1
French Open; Paris, France; Grand Slam; Clay, outdoor 25 May – 7 June 2008	47 / 366	3R	(Finland) Jarkko Nieminen	26	Win	6–1, 6–3, 6–1
French Open; Paris, France; Grand Slam; Clay, outdoor 25 May – 7 June 2008	48 / 367	4R	(Spain) Fernando Verdasco	23	Win	6–1, 6–0, 6–2
French Open; Paris, France; Grand Slam; Clay, outdoor 25 May – 7 June 2008	49 / 368	QF	(Spain) Nicolás Almagro	20	Win	6–1, 6–1, 6–1
French Open; Paris, France; Grand Slam; Clay, outdoor 25 May – 7 June 2008	50 / 369	SF	(Serbia) Novak Djokovic	3	Win	6–4, 6–2, 7–6^{(7–4)}
French Open; Paris, France; Grand Slam; Clay, outdoor 25 May – 7 June 2008	51 / 370	F	(Switzerland) Roger Federer	1	Win (4)	6–1, 6–3, 6–0
Artois Championships; London, United Kingdom; ATP World Tour 250; Grass, outdoor 9–15 June 2008	–	1R	Bye			
Artois Championships; London, United Kingdom; ATP World Tour 250; Grass, outdoor 9–15 June 2008	52 / 371	2R	(Sweden) Jonas Björkman	102	Win	6–2, 6–2
Artois Championships; London, United Kingdom; ATP World Tour 250; Grass, outdoor 9–15 June 2008	53 / 372	3R	(Japan) Kei Nishikori	113	Win	6–4, 3–6, 6–3
Artois Championships; London, United Kingdom; ATP World Tour 250; Grass, outdoor 9–15 June 2008	54 / 373	QF	(Croatia) Ivo Karlović	22	Win	6–7^{(5–7)}, 7–6^{(7–5)}, 7–6^{(7–4)}
Artois Championships; London, United Kingdom; ATP World Tour 250; Grass, outdoor 9–15 June 2008	55 / 374	SF	(United States) Andy Roddick	6	Win	7–5, 6–4
Artois Championships; London, United Kingdom; ATP World Tour 250; Grass, outdoor 9–15 June 2008	56 / 375	F	(Serbia) Novak Djokovic	3	Win (5)	7–6^{(8–6)}, 7–5
The Championships, Wimbledon; Wimbledon, United Kingdom; Grand Slam; Grass, outdoor 23 June – 6 July 2008	57 / 376	1R	(Germany) Andreas Beck	122	Win	6–4, 6–4, 7–6^{(7–0)}
The Championships, Wimbledon; Wimbledon, United Kingdom; Grand Slam; Grass, outdoor 23 June – 6 July 2008	58 / 377	2R	(Latvia) Ernests Gulbis	48	Win	5–7, 6–2, 7–6^{(7–2)}, 6–3
The Championships, Wimbledon; Wimbledon, United Kingdom; Grand Slam; Grass, outdoor 23 June – 6 July 2008	59 / 378	3R	(Germany) Nicolas Kiefer	32	Win	7–6^{(7–3)}, 6–2, 6–3
The Championships, Wimbledon; Wimbledon, United Kingdom; Grand Slam; Grass, outdoor 23 June – 6 July 2008	60 / 379	4R	(Russia) Mikhail Youzhny	17	Win	6–3, 6–3, 6–1
The Championships, Wimbledon; Wimbledon, United Kingdom; Grand Slam; Grass, outdoor 23 June – 6 July 2008	61 / 380	QF	(United Kingdom) Andy Murray	11	Win	6–3, 6–2, 6–4
The Championships, Wimbledon; Wimbledon, United Kingdom; Grand Slam; Grass, outdoor 23 June – 6 July 2008	62 / 381	SF	(Germany) Rainer Schüttler	94	Win	6–1, 7–6^{(7–3)}, 6–4
The Championships, Wimbledon; Wimbledon, United Kingdom; Grand Slam; Grass, outdoor 23 June – 6 July 2008	63 / 382	F	(Switzerland) Roger Federer	1	Win (6)	6–4, 6–4, 6–7^{(5–7)}, 6–7^{(8–10)}, 9–7
Rogers Cup; Toronto, Canada; ATP World Tour Masters 1000; Hard, outdoor 21–27 July 2008	–	1R	Bye			
Rogers Cup; Toronto, Canada; ATP World Tour Masters 1000; Hard, outdoor 21–27 July 2008	64 / 383	2R	(Canada) Jesse Levine	123	Win	6–4, 6–2
Rogers Cup; Toronto, Canada; ATP World Tour Masters 1000; Hard, outdoor 21–27 July 2008	65 / 384	3R	(Russia) Igor Andreev	26	Win	6–2, 7–6^{(7–1)}
Rogers Cup; Toronto, Canada; ATP World Tour Masters 1000; Hard, outdoor 21–27 July 2008	66 / 385	QF	(France) Richard Gasquet	12	Win	6–7^{(12–14)}, 6–2, 6–1
Rogers Cup; Toronto, Canada; ATP World Tour Masters 1000; Hard, outdoor 21–27 July 2008	67 / 386	SF	(United Kingdom) Andy Murray	9	Win	7–6^{(7–2)}, 6–3
Rogers Cup; Toronto, Canada; ATP World Tour Masters 1000; Hard, outdoor 21–27 July 2008	68 / 387	F	(Germany) Nicolas Kiefer	37	Win (7)	6–3, 6–2
Western & Southern Open; Ohio, United States; ATP World Tour Masters 1000; Hard, outdoor 28 July – 3 August 2008	–	1R	Bye			
Western & Southern Open; Ohio, United States; ATP World Tour Masters 1000; Hard, outdoor 28 July – 3 August 2008	69 / 388	2R	(France) Florent Serra	84	Win	6–0, 6–1
Western & Southern Open; Ohio, United States; ATP World Tour Masters 1000; Hard, outdoor 28 July – 3 August 2008	70 / 389	3R	(Germany) Tommy Haas	42	Win	6–4, 7–6^{(7–0)}
Western & Southern Open; Ohio, United States; ATP World Tour Masters 1000; Hard, outdoor 28 July – 3 August 2008	71 / 390	QF	(Ecuador) Nicolás Lapentti	89	Win	7–6^{(7–3)}, 6–1
Western & Southern Open; Ohio, United States; ATP World Tour Masters 1000; Hard, outdoor 28 July – 3 August 2008	72 / 391	SF	(Serbia) Novak Djokovic	3	Loss	1–6, 5–7
Summer Olympic Games; Beijing, China; Hard, outdoor 11–17 August 2008	73 / 392	1R	(Italy) Potito Starace	74	Win	6–2, 3–6, 6–2
Summer Olympic Games; Beijing, China; Hard, outdoor 11–17 August 2008	74 / 393	2R	(Australia) Lleyton Hewitt	38	Win	6–1, 6–2
Summer Olympic Games; Beijing, China; Hard, outdoor 11–17 August 2008	75 / 394	3R	(Russia) Igor Andreev	23	Win	6–4, 6–2
Summer Olympic Games; Beijing, China; Hard, outdoor 11–17 August 2008	76 / 395	QF	(Austria) Jürgen Melzer	51	Win	6–0, 6–4
Summer Olympic Games; Beijing, China; Hard, outdoor 11–17 August 2008	77 / 396	SF	(Serbia) Novak Djokovic	3	Win	6–4, 1–6, 6–4
Summer Olympic Games; Beijing, China; Hard, outdoor 11–17 August 2008	78 / 397	F	(Chile) Fernando González	15	Win (8)	6–3, 7–6^{(7–2)}, 6–3
US Open; New York, USA; Grand Slam; Hard, outdoor 25 August – 7 September 2008	79 / 398	1R	(Germany) Björn Phau	136	Win	7–6^{(7–4)}, 6–3, 7–6^{(7–4)}
US Open; New York, USA; Grand Slam; Hard, outdoor 25 August – 7 September 2008	80 / 399	2R	(United States) Ryler DeHeart	261	Win	6–1, 6–2, 6–4
US Open; New York, USA; Grand Slam; Hard, outdoor 25 August – 7 September 2008	81 / 400	3R	(Serbia) Viktor Troicki	71	Win	6–4, 6–3, 6–0
US Open; New York, USA; Grand Slam; Hard, outdoor 25 August – 7 September 2008	82 / 401	4R	(United States) Sam Querrey	55	Win	6–2, 5–7, 7–6^{(7–2)}, 6–3
US Open; New York, USA; Grand Slam; Hard, outdoor 25 August – 7 September 2008	83 / 402	QF	(United States) Mardy Fish	35	Win	3–6, 6–1, 6–4, 6–2
US Open; New York, USA; Grand Slam; Hard, outdoor 25 August – 7 September 2008	84 / 403	SF	(United Kingdom) Andy Murray	6	Loss	2–6, 6–7^{(5–7)}, 6–4, 4–6
Davis Cup, USA v/s ESP World Group Semifinals; Spain; Davis Cup; Clay, outdoor 19–21 September 2008	85 / 404	SF	(United States) Sam Querrey	39	Win	6–7^{(5–7)}, 6–4, 6–3, 6–4
Davis Cup, USA v/s ESP World Group Semifinals; Spain; Davis Cup; Clay, outdoor 19–21 September 2008	86 / 405	SF	(United States) Andy Roddick	8	Win	6–4, 6–0, 6–4
Mutua Madrileña Masters Madrid; Madrid, Spain; ATP World Tour Masters 1000; Hard, indoor 12–18 October 2008	–	1R	Bye			
Mutua Madrileña Masters Madrid; Madrid, Spain; ATP World Tour Masters 1000; Hard, indoor 12–18 October 2008	87 / 406	2R	(Latvia) Ernests Gulbis	54	Win	7–5, 3–6, 6–3
Mutua Madrileña Masters Madrid; Madrid, Spain; ATP World Tour Masters 1000; Hard, indoor 12–18 October 2008	88 / 407	3R	(France) Richard Gasquet	14	Win	6–4, 6–2
Mutua Madrileña Masters Madrid; Madrid, Spain; ATP World Tour Masters 1000; Hard, indoor 12–18 October 2008	89 / 408	QF	(Spain) Feliciano López	40	Win	6–4, 6–4
Mutua Madrileña Masters Madrid; Madrid, Spain; ATP World Tour Masters 1000; Hard, indoor 12–18 October 2008	90 / 409	SF	(France) Gilles Simon	16	Loss	6–3, 5–7, 6–7^{(6–8)}
BNP Paribas Open; Paris, France; ATP World Tour Masters 1000; Hard, indoor 26 October – 2 November 2008	–	1R	Bye			
BNP Paribas Open; Paris, France; ATP World Tour Masters 1000; Hard, indoor 26 October – 2 November 2008	91 / 410	2R	(France) Florent Serra	63	Win	6–2, 6–4
BNP Paribas Open; Paris, France; ATP World Tour Masters 1000; Hard, indoor 26 October – 2 November 2008	92 / 411	3R	(France) Gaël Monfils	16	Win	6–3, 6–2
BNP Paribas Open; Paris, France; ATP World Tour Masters 1000; Hard, indoor 26 October – 2 November 2008	93 / 412	QF	(Russia) Nikolay Davydenko	6	Loss	1–6 RET

=== Doubles matches ===
Tournament	Match	Round	Opponents	Ranks	Result	Score
Chennai Open; Chennai, India; ATP World Tour 250; Hard, outdoor December 31, 2007 – January 6, 2008; Partner: (Spain) Bartolomé Salvá Vidal	1 / 97	1R	(Cyprus) Marcos Baghdatis (France) Marc Gicquel	106; 148	Loss	4–6, 4–6
ABN AMRO World Tennis Tournament; Rotterdam, Netherlands; ATP World Tour 500; Hard, indoor 18–24 February 2008; Partner: (Spain) Tommy Robredo	2 / 98	1R	(Spain) Feliciano López (Spain) Fernando Verdasco	124; 115	Win	7–6^{(7–2)}, 7–5
ABN AMRO World Tennis Tournament; Rotterdam, Netherlands; ATP World Tour 500; Hard, indoor 18–24 February 2008; Partner: (Spain) Tommy Robredo	–	2R	(Sweden) Simon Aspelin (Austria) Julian Knowle	8; 6	Loss	W/O
Barclays Dubai Tennis Championships; Dubai, UAE; ATP World Tour 500; Hard, outdoor 3–9 March 2008; Partner: (Spain) Feliciano López	3 / 99	1R	(South Africa) Jeff Coetzee (South Africa) Wesley Moodie	24; 32	Win	6–4, 7–6^{(7–5)}
Barclays Dubai Tennis Championships; Dubai, UAE; ATP World Tour 500; Hard, outdoor 3–9 March 2008; Partner: (Spain) Feliciano López	4 / 100	2R	(India) Mahesh Bhupathi (The Bahamas) Mark Knowles	18; 3	Loss	1–6, 1–6
Pacific Life Open; Indian Wells, United States; ATP World Tour Masters 1000; Hard, outdoor 13–19 March 2008; Partner: (Spain) David Ferrer	5 / 101	1R	(Australia) Paul Hanley (India) Leander Paes	15; 18	Loss	3–6, 4–6
Sony Ericsson Open; Miami, United States; ATP World Tour Masters 1000; Hard, outdoor 27 March – 9 April 2008; Partner: (Spain) Tommy Robredo	6 / 102	1R	(United States) Bob Bryan (United States) Mike Bryan	1; 1	Loss	6–7^{(5–7)}, 6–3, (5–10)
Monte-Carlo Rolex Masters; Monte Carlo, Monaco; ATP World Tour Masters 1000; Clay, outdoor 20–26 April 2008; Partner: (Spain) Tommy Robredo	7 / 103	1R	(Monaco) Guillaume Couillard (Monaco) Jean-Rene Lisnard	1017; 304	Win	6–2, 6–1
Monte-Carlo Rolex Masters; Monte Carlo, Monaco; ATP World Tour Masters 1000; Clay, outdoor 20–26 April 2008; Partner: (Spain) Tommy Robredo	8 / 104	2R	(Canada) Daniel Nestor (Serbia) Nenad Zimonjić	4; 8	Win	5–7, 6–3, (10–3)
Monte-Carlo Rolex Masters; Monte Carlo, Monaco; ATP World Tour Masters 1000; Clay, outdoor 20–26 April 2008; Partner: (Spain) Tommy Robredo	9 / 105	QF	(Czech Republic) František Čermák (Germany) Philipp Kohlschreiber	31; 65	Win	6–7^{(5–7)}, 6–1, (10–3)
Monte-Carlo Rolex Masters; Monte Carlo, Monaco; ATP World Tour Masters 1000; Clay, outdoor 20–26 April 2008; Partner: (Spain) Tommy Robredo	10 / 106	SF	(Sweden) Jonas Björkman (Zimbabwe) Kevin Ullyett	23; 16	Win	5–7, 7–6^{(8–6)}, (10–7)
Monte-Carlo Rolex Masters; Monte Carlo, Monaco; ATP World Tour Masters 1000; Clay, outdoor 20–26 April 2008; Partner: (Spain) Tommy Robredo	11 / 107	F	(India) Mahesh Bhupathi (The Bahamas) Mark Knowles	13; 3	Win (1)	6–3, 6–3
Artois Championships; London, United Kingdom; ATP World Tour 250; Grass, outdoor 9–15 June 2008; Partner: (Argentina) Mariano Hood	12 / 108	1R	(Chile) Fernando González (Ecuador) Nicolás Lapentti	115; 191	Loss	6–7^{(4–7)}, 5–7
Rogers Cup; Toronto, Canada; ATP World Tour Masters 1000; Hard, outdoor 21–27 July 2008; Partner: (Spain) Tommy Robredo	13 / 109	1R	(Russia) Igor Andreev (Russia) Nikolay Davydenko	426; 302	Loss	6–3, 3–6, (7–10)
Summer Olympic Games; Beijing, China; Hard, outdoor 11–17 August 2008; Partner: (Spain) Tommy Robredo	14 / 110	1R	(Sweden) Jonas Björkman (Sweden) Robin Söderling	11; 156	Win	6–3, 6–3
Summer Olympic Games; Beijing, China; Hard, outdoor 11–17 August 2008; Partner: (Spain) Tommy Robredo	15 / 111	2R	(Australia) Chris Guccione (Australia) Lleyton Hewitt	253; 634	Loss	2–6, 6–7^{(5–7)}
Mutua Madrileña Masters Madrid; Madrid, Spain; ATP World Tour Masters 1000; Hard, indoor 12–18 October 2008; Partner: (Spain) Carlos Moyá	16 / 112	1R	(United States) James Blake (United States) Mardy Fish	128; 82	Win	4–6, 7–6^{(7–5)}, (10–5)
Mutua Madrileña Masters Madrid; Madrid, Spain; ATP World Tour Masters 1000; Hard, indoor 12–18 October 2008; Partner: (Spain) Carlos Moyá	–	2R	(India) Mahesh Bhupathi (The Bahamas) Mark Knowles	11; 5	Loss	W/O
2008 BNP Paribas Masters; Paris, France; ATP World Tour Masters 1000; Hard, indoor 26 October 26–2 November 2008; Partner: (Argentina) Juan Mónaco	17 / 113	1R	(France) Paul-Henri Mathieu (France) Nicolas Mahut	109; 80	Win	6–2, 6–4
2008 BNP Paribas Masters; Paris, France; ATP World Tour Masters 1000; Hard, indoor 26 October 26–2 November 2008; Partner: (Argentina) Juan Mónaco	18 / 114	2R	(India) Mahesh Bhupathi (The Bahamas) Mark Knowles	7; 5	Win	6–4, 6–2
2008 BNP Paribas Masters; Paris, France; ATP World Tour Masters 1000; Hard, indoor 26 October 26–2 November 2008; Partner: (Argentina) Juan Mónaco	–	QF	(South Africa) Jeff Coetzee (South Africa) Wesley Moodie	13; 15	Loss	W/O

== See also ==
- 2008 ATP World Tour
- 2008 Roger Federer tennis season
- 2008 Novak Djokovic tennis season
