= 2008 Novak Djokovic tennis season =

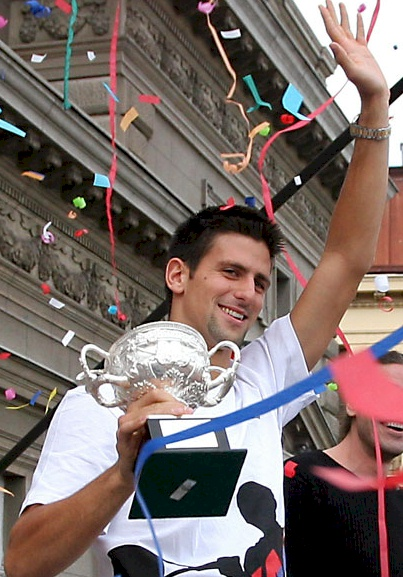
- Djokovic celebrating his first Australian Open triumph in Belgrade
- Full name: Novak Djokovic
- Country: Serbia
- Calendar prize money: $5,689,078 (singles & doubles)

Singles
- Season record: 64–17
- Calendar titles: 4
- Year-end ranking: No. 3
- Ranking change from previous year: Steady

Grand Slam & significant results
- Australian Open: W
- French Open: SF
- Wimbledon: 2R
- US Open: SF
- Other tournaments
- Tour Finals: W
- Olympic Games: Bronze

Doubles
- Season record: 2–5
- Calendar titles: 0
- Current ranking: No. 579
- Ranking change from previous year: ▼436

Davis Cup
- Davis Cup: 1R

The 2008 Novak Djokovic tennis season commenced on January 14 with the start of the 2008 Australian Open.

== Yearly summary ==
=== Early hard court season ===
Djokovic started his preparations for the season by playing the Hopman Cup with fellow Serbian world No. 3 Jelena Janković where he won all of his four singles matches, including in the final against the United States, where he beat Mardy Fish in a deciding set tiebreak to level the tie, but then losing the decisive mixed doubles rubber, in which he faced former WTA No. 1 Serena Williams in a competitive event for the first time.

==== Australian Open ====
At the Australian Open, Djokovic reached his second consecutive Grand Slam final, this time without dropping a set, including a victory over two-time defending champion Federer in the semifinals. By reaching the semifinals, Djokovic became the youngest player in the Open Era to have reached the semifinals in all four Grand Slam events. In the final, Djokovic defeated unseeded Frenchman Jo-Wilfried Tsonga in four sets to earn his first Grand Slam singles title. This marked the first time since the 2005 Australian Open that a Grand Slam singles title was not won by Federer or Nadal.

Djokovic became the first Serbian player to win a Grand Slam men's singles title.

==== Indian Wells Open ====
At the Indian Wells Open, Djokovic won his ninth career singles title, defeating Mardy Fish in the final.

=== Clay court season ===
==== Italian Open ====
Djokovic won his tenth career singles title and fourth Master Series singles crown at the Italian Open in Rome after defeating Wawrinka in the final.

==== French Open ====
At the French Open, Djokovic was the third-seeded player behind Federer and Nadal. He lost to Nadal in the semifinals in straight sets.

=== Grass court season ===
==== Wimbledon ====
On grass, Djokovic once again played Nadal, this time in the Artois Championships final in Queen's Club, where he lost in two sets. Djokovic entered Wimbledon seeded third but lost in the second round to Marat Safin, ending a streak of five consecutive majors where he had reached at least the semifinals.

=== Fall hard court season ===
==== Cincinnati Open ====
Djokovic then failed to defend his 2007 singles title at the Canadian Open in Toronto, where he was eliminated in the quarterfinals by Andy Murray. The following week at the Cincinnati Open, Djokovic advanced to the final, beating Nadal in the semifinals, which not only ended the Spaniard's 32-match winning streak, but also delayed Nadal's first ascension to world No. 1 by a week. In the final, he again lost to Murray in straight sets.

==== Olympic Games ====
In August, Djokovic represented Serbia in the tennis tournament of the 2008 Summer Olympics, his first Olympics. He and Nenad Zimonjić, seeded second in men's doubles, were eliminated in the first round by the Czech pairing of Martin Damm and Pavel Vízner. Seeded third in singles, Djokovic lost in the semifinals to Nadal. Djokovic then defeated James Blake, the loser of the other semifinal, in the bronze medal match.

==== US Open ====
After the Olympics, Djokovic entered the US Open seeded third, where he defeated Roddick in the quarterfinals. To a smattering of boos in a post-match interview, Djokovic criticized Roddick for accusing him of making excessive use of the trainer during matches and for suggesting that he was faking his injuries. His run at the US Open ended in the semifinals when he lost to Federer in four sets, in a rematch of the previous year's final. In November, Djokovic was the second seed at the year-ending Tennis Masters Cup in Shanghai, beating Juan Martín del Potro and Nikolay Davydenko in the round-robin stage, and Gilles Simon in the semifinals. In the final, Djokovic defeated Davydenko to win his first title at the year-end championship.

== All matches ==
This table lists all the matches of Djokovic this year, including walkovers (W/O)

Key
W	F	SF	QF	#R	RR	Q#	P#	DNQ	A	Z#	PO	G	S	B	NMS	NTI	P	NH

(W) winner; (F) finalist; (SF) semifinalist; (QF) quarterfinalist; (#R) rounds 4, 3, 2, 1; (RR) round-robin stage; (Q#) qualification round; (P#) preliminary round; (DNQ) did not qualify; (A) absent; (Z#) Davis/Fed Cup Zonal Group (with number indication) or (PO) play-off; (G) gold, (S) silver or (B) bronze Olympic/Paralympic medal; (NMS) not a Masters tournament; (NTI) not a Tier I tournament; (P) postponed; (NH) not held; (SR) strike rate (events won / competed); (W–L) win–loss record.
To avoid confusion and double counting, these charts are updated at the conclusion of a tournament or when the player's participation has ended.

=== Singles matches ===
Tournament	Match	Round	Opponent (seed or key)	Rank	Result	Score
Australian Open; Melbourne, Australia; Grand Slam tournament Hard, outdoor 14 – 27 January 2008
Australian Open; Melbourne, Australia; Grand Slam tournament Hard, outdoor 14 – 27 January 2008	1 / 173	1R	(Germany) Benjamin Becker	81	Win	6–0, 6–2, 7–6^{(7–5)}
Australian Open; Melbourne, Australia; Grand Slam tournament Hard, outdoor 14 – 27 January 2008	2 / 174	2R	(Italy) Simone Bolelli	70	Win	6–1, 6–2, 6–2
Australian Open; Melbourne, Australia; Grand Slam tournament Hard, outdoor 14 – 27 January 2008	3 / 175	3R	(United States) Sam Querrey	62	Win	6–3, 6–1, 6–3
Australian Open; Melbourne, Australia; Grand Slam tournament Hard, outdoor 14 – 27 January 2008	4 / 176	4R	(Australia) Lleyton Hewitt (19)	22	Win	7–5, 6–3, 6–3
Australian Open; Melbourne, Australia; Grand Slam tournament Hard, outdoor 14 – 27 January 2008	5 / 177	QF	(Spain) David Ferrer (5)	5	Win	6–0, 6–3, 7–5
Australian Open; Melbourne, Australia; Grand Slam tournament Hard, outdoor 14 – 27 January 2008	6 / 178	SF	(Switzerland) Roger Federer (1)	1	Win	7–5, 6–3, 7–6^{(7–5)}
Australian Open; Melbourne, Australia; Grand Slam tournament Hard, outdoor 14 – 27 January 2008	7 / 179	W	(France) Jo-Wilfried Tsonga	38	Win (1)	4–6, 6–4, 6–3, 7–6^{(7–2)}
Davis Cup World Group; 1st Round: Russia vs Serbia; Moscow, Russia; Davis Cup; Hard, indoor 8 – 10 February 2008
Davis Cup World Group; 1st Round: Russia vs Serbia; Moscow, Russia; Davis Cup; Hard, indoor 8 – 10 February 2008	8 / 180	RR	(Russia) Nikolay Davydenko	4	Loss	6–4, 6–3, 4–6 Ret.
Marseille Open; Marseille, France; ATP 250; Hard, indoor 11 – 17 February 2008
Marseille Open; Marseille, France; ATP 250; Hard, indoor 11 – 17 February 2008	9 / 181	1R	(Croatia) Ivan Dodig (Q)	296	Win	6–1, 6–4
Marseille Open; Marseille, France; ATP 250; Hard, indoor 11 – 17 February 2008	10 / 182	2R	(France) Gilles Simon	30	Loss	2–6, 7–6^{(8–6)}, 3–6
Dubai Tennis Championships; Dubai, United Arab Emirates; ATP 500; Hard, outdoor 3 – 9 March 2008
Dubai Tennis Championships; Dubai, United Arab Emirates; ATP 500; Hard, outdoor 3 – 9 March 2008	11 / 183	1R	(Croatia) Marin Čilić	45	Win	6–4, 6–3
Dubai Tennis Championships; Dubai, United Arab Emirates; ATP 500; Hard, outdoor 3 – 9 March 2008	12 / 184	2R	(France) Fabrice Santoro	47	Win	6–3, 7–6^{(7–3)}
Dubai Tennis Championships; Dubai, United Arab Emirates; ATP 500; Hard, outdoor 3 – 9 March 2008	13 / 185	QF	(Russia) Igor Andreev	34	Win	6–2, 6–1
Dubai Tennis Championships; Dubai, United Arab Emirates; ATP 500; Hard, outdoor 3 – 9 March 2008	14 / 186	SF	(United States) Andy Roddick (6)	6	Loss	6–7^{(5–7)}, 3–6
Indian Wells Masters; Indian Wells, United States; ATP 1000; Hard, outdoor 10 – 23 March 2008
Indian Wells Masters; Indian Wells, United States; ATP 1000; Hard, outdoor 10 – 23 March 2008	–	1R	Bye			
Indian Wells Masters; Indian Wells, United States; ATP 1000; Hard, outdoor 10 – 23 March 2008	15 / 187	2R	(Italy) Andreas Seppi	40	Win	6–3, 7–6^{(7–3)}
Indian Wells Masters; Indian Wells, United States; ATP 1000; Hard, outdoor 10 – 23 March 2008	16 / 188	3R	(Germany) Philipp Kohlschreiber (27)	27	Win	6–3, 6–2
Indian Wells Masters; Indian Wells, United States; ATP 1000; Hard, outdoor 10 – 23 March 2008	17 / 189	4R	(Argentina) Guillermo Cañas (16)	16	Win	6–2, 6–3
Indian Wells Masters; Indian Wells, United States; ATP 1000; Hard, outdoor 10 – 23 March 2008	18 / 190	QF	(Switzerland) Stan Wawrinka	35	Win	7–6^{(7–5)}, 6–2
Indian Wells Masters; Indian Wells, United States; ATP 1000; Hard, outdoor 10 – 23 March 2008	19 / 191	SF	(Spain) Rafael Nadal (2)	2	Win	6–3, 6–2
Indian Wells Masters; Indian Wells, United States; ATP 1000; Hard, outdoor 10 – 23 March 2008	20 / 192	W	(United States) Mardy Fish	98	Win (2)	6–2, 5–7, 6–3
Miami Open; Miami, United States; ATP 1000; Hard, outdoor 24 March – 6 April 2008
Miami Open; Miami, United States; ATP 1000; Hard, outdoor 24 March – 6 April 2008	–	1R	Bye			
Miami Open; Miami, United States; ATP 1000; Hard, outdoor 24 March – 6 April 2008	21 / 193	2R	(South Africa) Kevin Anderson (Q)	122	Loss	6–7^{(1–7)}, 6–3, 4–6
Masters Series Monte-Carlo; Monte Carlo, Monaco; ATP 1000; Clay, outdoor 21 – 27 April 2008
Masters Series Monte-Carlo; Monte Carlo, Monaco; ATP 1000; Clay, outdoor 21 – 27 April 2008	–	1R	Bye			
Masters Series Monte-Carlo; Monte Carlo, Monaco; ATP 1000; Clay, outdoor 21 – 27 April 2008	22 / 194	2R	(Croatia) Ivan Ljubičić	29	Win	6–3, 6–3
Masters Series Monte-Carlo; Monte Carlo, Monaco; ATP 1000; Clay, outdoor 21 – 27 April 2008	23 / 195	3R	(United Kingdom) Andy Murray (14)	20	Win	6–0, 6–4
Masters Series Monte-Carlo; Monte Carlo, Monaco; ATP 1000; Clay, outdoor 21 – 27 April 2008	24 / 196	QF	(United States) Sam Querrey	50	Win	6–4, 6–0
Masters Series Monte-Carlo; Monte Carlo, Monaco; ATP 1000; Clay, outdoor 21 – 27 April 2008	25 / 197	SF	(Switzerland) Roger Federer (1)	1	Loss	3–6, 2–3 Ret.
Italian Open; Rome, Italy; ATP 1000; Clay, outdoor 5 – 11 May 2008
Italian Open; Rome, Italy; ATP 1000; Clay, outdoor 5 – 11 May 2008	–	1R	Bye			
Italian Open; Rome, Italy; ATP 1000; Clay, outdoor 5 – 11 May 2008	26 / 198	2R	(Belgium) Steve Darcis	49	Win	6–4, 6–0
Italian Open; Rome, Italy; ATP 1000; Clay, outdoor 5 – 11 May 2008	27 / 199	3R	(Russia) Igor Andreev	26	Win	6–3, 3–6, 6–3
Italian Open; Rome, Italy; ATP 1000; Clay, outdoor 5 – 11 May 2008	28 / 200	QF	(Spain) Nicolas Almagro	21	Win	6–1, 1–0 Ret.
Italian Open; Rome, Italy; ATP 1000; Clay, outdoor 5 – 11 May 2008	29 / 201	SF	(Czech Republic) Radek Štěpánek	27	Win	6–0, 1–0 Ret.
Italian Open; Rome, Italy; ATP 1000; Clay, outdoor 5 – 11 May 2008	30 / 202	W	(Switzerland) Stan Wawrinka	24	Win (3)	4–6, 6–3, 6–3
Hamburg Open; Hamburg, Germany; ATP 1000; Clay, outdoor 12 – 18 May 2008
Hamburg Open; Hamburg, Germany; ATP 1000; Clay, outdoor 12 – 18 May 2008	–	1R	Bye			
Hamburg Open; Hamburg, Germany; ATP 1000; Clay, outdoor 12 – 18 May 2008	31 / 203	2R	(Argentina) Juan Ignacio Chela	39	Win	6–3, 6–1
Hamburg Open; Hamburg, Germany; ATP 1000; Clay, outdoor 12 – 18 May 2008	32 / 204	3R	(Croatia) Ivo Karlović	24	Win	7–6^{(7–3)}, 6–3
Hamburg Open; Hamburg, Germany; ATP 1000; Clay, outdoor 12 – 18 May 2008	33 / 205	QF	(Spain) Albert Montañés	78	Win	6–2, 6–3
Hamburg Open; Hamburg, Germany; ATP 1000; Clay, outdoor 12 – 18 May 2008	34 / 206	SF	(Spain) Rafael Nadal (2)	2	Loss	5–7, 6–2, 2–6
French Open; Paris, France; Grand Slam tournament Clay, outdoor 26 May – 8 June 2008
French Open; Paris, France; Grand Slam tournament Clay, outdoor 26 May – 8 June 2008	35 / 207	1R	(Germany) Denis Gremelmayr	64	Win	4–6, 6–3, 7–5, 6–2
French Open; Paris, France; Grand Slam tournament Clay, outdoor 26 May – 8 June 2008	36 / 208	2R	(Spain) Miguel Ángel López Jaén (Q)	264	Win	6–1, 6–1, 6–3
French Open; Paris, France; Grand Slam tournament Clay, outdoor 26 May – 8 June 2008	37 / 209	3R	(United States) Wayne Odesnik (WC)	106	Win	7–5, 6–4, 6–2
French Open; Paris, France; Grand Slam tournament Clay, outdoor 26 May – 8 June 2008	38 / 210	4R	(France) Paul-Henri Mathieu (18)	19	Win	6–4, 6–3, 6–4
French Open; Paris, France; Grand Slam tournament Clay, outdoor 26 May – 8 June 2008	39 / 211	QF	(Latvia) Ernests Gulbis	80	Win	7–5, 7–6^{(7–3)}, 7–5
French Open; Paris, France; Grand Slam tournament Clay, outdoor 26 May – 8 June 2008	40 / 212	SF	(Spain) Rafael Nadal (2)	2	Loss	4–6, 2–6, 6–7^{(3–7)}
Queens Club Championships; London, England; ATP 250; Grass, outdoor 9 June – 15 June 2008
Queens Club Championships; London, England; ATP 250; Grass, outdoor 9 June – 15 June 2008	–	1R	Bye			
Queens Club Championships; London, England; ATP 250; Grass, outdoor 9 June – 15 June 2008	41 / 213	2R	(Croatia) Roko Karanušić	112	Win	6–2, 7–6^{(9–7)}
Queens Club Championships; London, England; ATP 250; Grass, outdoor 9 June – 15 June 2008	42 / 214	3R	(Serbia) Janko Tipsarević (13)	39	Win	2–6, 6–1, 6–4
Queens Club Championships; London, England; ATP 250; Grass, outdoor 9 June – 15 June 2008	43 / 215	QF	(Australia) Lleyton Hewitt (11)	30	Win	6–2, 6–2
Queens Club Championships; London, England; ATP 250; Grass, outdoor 9 June – 15 June 2008	44 / 216	SF	(Argentina) David Nalbandian (4)	8	Win	6–1, 6–0
Queens Club Championships; London, England; ATP 250; Grass, outdoor 9 June – 15 June 2008	45 / 217	F	(Spain) Rafael Nadal (2)	2	Loss	6–7^{(6–8)}, 5–7
Wimbledon Championships; London, United Kingdom; Grand Slam tournament Grass, outdoor 23 June – 6 July 2008
Wimbledon Championships; London, United Kingdom; Grand Slam tournament Grass, outdoor 23 June – 6 July 2008	46 / 218	1R	(Germany) Michael Berrer	91	Win	7–5, 2–6, 6–3, 6–0
Wimbledon Championships; London, United Kingdom; Grand Slam tournament Grass, outdoor 23 June – 6 July 2008	47 / 219	2R	(Russia) Marat Safin	75	Loss	4–6, 6–7^{(3–7)}, 2–6
Canadian Open; Toronto, Canada; ATP 1000; Hard, outdoor 21 – 27 July 2008
Canadian Open; Toronto, Canada; ATP 1000; Hard, outdoor 21 – 27 July 2008	–	1R	Bye			
Canadian Open; Toronto, Canada; ATP 1000; Hard, outdoor 21 – 27 July 2008	48 / 220	2R	(Canada) Frank Dancevic (WC)	82	Win	6–4, 6–4
Canadian Open; Toronto, Canada; ATP 1000; Hard, outdoor 21 – 27 July 2008	49 / 221	3R	(Sweden) Robin Söderling	49	Win	6–4, 6–4
Canadian Open; Toronto, Canada; ATP 1000; Hard, outdoor 21 – 27 July 2008	50 / 222	QF	(United Kingdom) Andy Murray (8)	9	Loss	3–6, 6–7^{(3–7)}
Cincinnati Masters; Cincinnati, United States; ATP 1000; Hard, outdoor 28 July – 3 August 2008
Cincinnati Masters; Cincinnati, United States; ATP 1000; Hard, outdoor 28 July – 3 August 2008	–	1R	Bye			
Cincinnati Masters; Cincinnati, United States; ATP 1000; Hard, outdoor 28 July – 3 August 2008	51 / 223	2R	(Italy) Simone Bolelli	50	Win	7–6^{(7–2)}, 7–6^{(7–2)}
Cincinnati Masters; Cincinnati, United States; ATP 1000; Hard, outdoor 28 July – 3 August 2008	52 / 224	3R	(Italy) Andreas Seppi	39	Win	6–1, 6–2
Cincinnati Masters; Cincinnati, United States; ATP 1000; Hard, outdoor 28 July – 3 August 2008	53 / 225	QF	(Latvia) Ernests Gulbis	53	Win	6–3, 6–4
Cincinnati Masters; Cincinnati, United States; ATP 1000; Hard, outdoor 28 July – 3 August 2008	54 / 226	SF	(Spain) Rafael Nadal (2)	2	Win	6–1, 7–5
Cincinnati Masters; Cincinnati, United States; ATP 1000; Hard, outdoor 28 July – 3 August 2008	55 / 227	F	(United Kingdom) Andy Murray (8)	9	Loss	6–7^{(4–7)}, 6–7^{(5–7)}
2008 Summer Olympics; Beijing, China; Olympics; Hard, outdoor 11 – 17 August 2008
2008 Summer Olympics; Beijing, China; Olympics; Hard, outdoor 11 – 17 August 2008	56 / 228	1R	(United States) Robby Ginepri	59	Win	6–4, 6–4
2008 Summer Olympics; Beijing, China; Olympics; Hard, outdoor 11 – 17 August 2008	57 / 229	2R	(Germany) Rainer Schüttler	35	Win	6–4, 6–2
2008 Summer Olympics; Beijing, China; Olympics; Hard, outdoor 11 – 17 August 2008	58 / 230	3R	(Russia) Mikhail Youzhny (13)	22	Win	7–6^{(7–3)}, 6–3
2008 Summer Olympics; Beijing, China; Olympics; Hard, outdoor 11 – 17 August 2008	59 / 231	QF	(France) Gaël Monfils	43	Win	4–6, 6–1, 6–4
2008 Summer Olympics; Beijing, China; Olympics; Hard, outdoor 11 – 17 August 2008	60 / 232	SF	(Spain) Rafael Nadal (2)	2	Loss	4–6, 6–1, 4–6
2008 Summer Olympics; Beijing, China; Olympics; Hard, outdoor 11 – 17 August 2008	61 / 233	SF-B	(United States) James Blake (8)	7	Win	6–3, 7–6^{(7–4)}
US Open; New York City, United States; Grand Slam tournament Hard, outdoor 25 August – 7 September 2008
US Open; New York City, United States; Grand Slam tournament Hard, outdoor 25 August – 7 September 2008	62 / 234	1R	(France) Arnaud Clément	78	Win	6–3, 6–3, 6–4
US Open; New York City, United States; Grand Slam tournament Hard, outdoor 25 August – 7 September 2008	63 / 235	2R	(United States) Robert Kendrick (Q)	113	Win	7–6^{(10–8)}, 6–4, 6–4
US Open; New York City, United States; Grand Slam tournament Hard, outdoor 25 August – 7 September 2008	64 / 236	3R	(Croatia) Marin Čilić (30)	24	Win	6–7^{(7–9)}, 7–5, 6–4, 7–6^{(7–0)}
US Open; New York City, United States; Grand Slam tournament Hard, outdoor 25 August – 7 September 2008	65 / 237	4R	(Spain) Tommy Robredo (15)	15	Win	4–6, 6–2, 6–3, 5–7, 6–3
US Open; New York City, United States; Grand Slam tournament Hard, outdoor 25 August – 7 September 2008	66 / 238	QF	(United States) Andy Roddick (8)	8	Win	6–2, 6–3, 3–6, 7–6^{(7–5)}
US Open; New York City, United States; Grand Slam tournament Hard, outdoor 25 August – 7 September 2008	67 / 239	SF	(Switzerland) Roger Federer (2)	2	Loss	3–6, 7–5, 5–7, 2–6
Davis Cup World Group; Playoff: Slovakia vs Serbia; Bratislava, Slovakia; Davis Cup; Hard, indoor 19 – 21 September 2008
Davis Cup World Group; Playoff: Slovakia vs Serbia; Bratislava, Slovakia; Davis Cup; Hard, indoor 19 – 21 September 2008	68 / 240	RR	(Slovakia) Dominik Hrbatý	399	Win	6–2, 6–4, 6–3
Thailand Open; Bangkok, Thailand; ATP 250; Hard, indoor 22 – 28 September 2008
Thailand Open; Bangkok, Thailand; ATP 250; Hard, indoor 22 – 28 September 2008	–	1R	Bye			
Thailand Open; Bangkok, Thailand; ATP 250; Hard, indoor 22 – 28 September 2008	69 / 241	2R	(Germany) Simon Stadler (Q)	141	Win	6–1, 6–3
Thailand Open; Bangkok, Thailand; ATP 250; Hard, indoor 22 – 28 September 2008	70 / 242	QF	(Sweden) Robin Söderling (6)	34	Win	6–4, 7–5
Thailand Open; Bangkok, Thailand; ATP 250; Hard, indoor 22 – 28 September 2008	71 / 243	SF	(Czech Republic) Tomáš Berdych (3)	27	Win	7–5, 6–1
Thailand Open; Bangkok, Thailand; ATP 250; Hard, indoor 22 – 28 September 2008	72 / 244	F	(France) Jo-Wilfried Tsonga (2)	20	Loss	6–7^{(4–7)}, 4–6
Madrid Open; Madrid, Spain; ATP 1000; Hard, indoor 13 – 19 October 2008
Madrid Open; Madrid, Spain; ATP 1000; Hard, indoor 13 – 19 October 2008	–	1R	Bye			
Madrid Open; Madrid, Spain; ATP 1000; Hard, indoor 13 – 19 October 2008	73 / 245	2R	(Romania) Victor Hănescu (Q)	73	Win	6–7^{(8–10)}, 7–6^{(8–6)}, 3–1 Ret.
Madrid Open; Madrid, Spain; ATP 1000; Hard, indoor 13 – 19 October 2008	74 / 246	3R	(Croatia) Ivo Karlović (14)	21	Loss (2)	6–7^{(4–7)}, 6–7^{(5–7)}
Paris Masters; Paris, France; ATP 1000; Hard, indoor 27 October – 2 November 2008
Paris Masters; Paris, France; ATP 1000; Hard, indoor 27 October – 2 November 2008	–	1R	Bye			
Paris Masters; Paris, France; ATP 1000; Hard, indoor 27 October – 2 November 2008	75 / 247	2R	(Russia) Dmitry Tursunov	26	Win	6–2, 4–3 Ret.
Paris Masters; Paris, France; ATP 1000; Hard, indoor 27 October – 2 November 2008	76 / 248	3R	(France) Jo-Wilfried Tsonga (13)	14	Loss	4–6, 6–1, 3–6
Tennis Masters Cup; Shanghai, China; ATP Finals; Hard, indoor 10 – 16 November 2008
Tennis Masters Cup; Shanghai, China; ATP Finals; Hard, indoor 10 – 16 November 2008	77 / 249	RR	(Argentina) Juan Martin del Potro (7)	8	Win	7–5, 6–3
Tennis Masters Cup; Shanghai, China; ATP Finals; Hard, indoor 10 – 16 November 2008	78 / 250	RR	(Russia) Nikolay Davydenko (4)	5	Win	7–6^{(7–3)}, 0–6, 7–5
Tennis Masters Cup; Shanghai, China; ATP Finals; Hard, indoor 10 – 16 November 2008	79 / 251	RR	(France) Jo-Wilfried Tsonga (6)	7	Loss	6–1, 5–7, 1–6
Tennis Masters Cup; Shanghai, China; ATP Finals; Hard, indoor 10 – 16 November 2008	80 / 252	SF	(France) Gilles Simon (8)	9	Win	4–6, 6–3, 7–5
Tennis Masters Cup; Shanghai, China; ATP Finals; Hard, indoor 10 – 16 November 2008	81 / 253	W	(Russia) Nikolay Davydenko (4)	5	Win (4)	6–1, 7–5

- Source

=== Doubles matches ===
Tournament	Match	Round	Opponents (seed or key)	Ranks	Result	Score
Davis Cup World Group; 1st Round: Serbia vs Russia; Moscow, Russia; Davis Cup; Hard, indoor 4 – 10 February 2008; Partner: (Serbia) Nenad Zimonjić
Davis Cup World Group; 1st Round: Serbia vs Russia; Moscow, Russia; Davis Cup; Hard, indoor 4 – 10 February 2008; Partner: (Serbia) Nenad Zimonjić	1 / 37	RR	(Russia) Dmitry Tursunov / (Russia) Mikhail Youzhny	61 / 165	Win	6–3, 7–6^{(8–6)}, 7–6^{(7–5)}
Masters Series Monte-Carlo; Monte Carlo, Monaco; ATP 1000; Clay, outdoor 13 – 19 April 2009; Partner: (Czech Republic) Radek Štěpánek
Masters Series Monte-Carlo; Monte Carlo, Monaco; ATP 1000; Clay, outdoor 13 – 19 April 2009; Partner: (Czech Republic) Radek Štěpánek	2 / 38	1R	(Australia) Jordan Kerr / (Netherlands) Rogier Wassen	26 / 28	Win	6–4, 6–3
Masters Series Monte-Carlo; Monte Carlo, Monaco; ATP 1000; Clay, outdoor 13 – 19 April 2009; Partner: (Czech Republic) Radek Štěpánek	3 / 39	2R	(Sweden) Simon Aspelin / (Austria) Julian Knowle (5)	9 / 9	Loss	2–6, 6–7^{(3–7)}
Queens Club Championships; London, England; ATP 250; Grass, outdoor 9 June – 15 June 2008; Partner: (Serbia) Janko Tipsarević
Queens Club Championships; London, England; ATP 250; Grass, outdoor 9 June – 15 June 2008; Partner: (Serbia) Janko Tipsarević	4 / 40	1R	(South Africa) Rik de Voest / (South Africa) Chris Haggard (ALT)	50 / 69	Loss	4–6, 6–7^{(4–7)}
2008 Summer Olympics; Beijing, China; Olympics; Hard, outdoor 11 – 17 August 2008; Partner: (Serbia) Nenad Zimonjić
2008 Summer Olympics; Beijing, China; Olympics; Hard, outdoor 11 – 17 August 2008; Partner: (Serbia) Nenad Zimonjić	5 / 41	1R	(Czech Republic) Martin Damm / (Czech Republic) Pavel Vízner	27 / 14	Loss	6–3, 0–6, 2–6
Thailand Open; Bangkok, Thailand; ATP 250; Hard, indoor 22 – 28 September 2008; Partner: (Serbia) Marko Djoković
Thailand Open; Bangkok, Thailand; ATP 250; Hard, indoor 22 – 28 September 2008; Partner: (Serbia) Marko Djoković	6 / 42	1R	(France) Fabrice Santoro / (France) Jo-Wilfried Tsonga	87 / 80	Loss	2–6, 2–6
Paris Masters; Paris, France; ATP 1000; Hard, indoor 27 October – 2 November 2008; Partner: (Serbia) Viktor Troicki
Paris Masters; Paris, France; ATP 1000; Hard, indoor 27 October – 2 November 2008; Partner: (Serbia) Viktor Troicki	7 / 43	3R	(Argentina) José Acasuso / (Spain) David Ferrer	93 / 421	Loss	4–6, 4–6

- Source

== Yearly records ==
=== Finals ===
==== Singles: 7 (4 titles, 3 runner-up) ====
Category Grand Slam (1–0) ATP Finals (1–0) Masters 1000 (2-1) 500 Series (0–0) 250 Series (0–2)	Titles by surface Hard (3–2) Clay (1–0) Grass (0–1)	Titles by setting Outdoor (3–2) Indoor (1–1)

Result	W–L	Date	Tournament	Tier	Surface	Opponent	Score
Win	8–3	Jan 2008	Australian Open, Australia	Grand Slam	Hard	(France) Jo-Wilfried Tsonga	4–6, 6–4, 6–3, 7–6^{(7–2)}
Win	9–3	Mar 2008	Indian Wells Masters, United States	Masters	Hard	(United States) Mardy Fish	6–2, 5–7, 6–3
Win	10–3	May 2008	Italian Open, Italy	Masters	Clay	(Switzerland) Stan Wawrinka	4–6, 6–3, 6–3
Loss	10–4	Jun 2008	Queen's Club Championships, UK	250 series	Grass	(Spain) Rafael Nadal	6–7^{(6–8)}, 5–7
Loss	10–5	Aug 2008	Cincinnati Masters, United States	Masters	Hard	(United Kingdom) Andy Murray	6–7^{(4–7)}, 6–7^{(5–7)}
Loss	10–6	Sep 2008	Thailand Open, Thailand	250 series	Hard (i)	(France) Jo-Wilfried Tsonga	6–7^{(4–7)}, 4–6
Win	11–6	Nov 2008	ATP Finals, China	Tour Finals	Hard (i)	(Russia) Nikolay Davydenko	6–1, 7–5

== See also ==
- 2008 ATP Tour
- 2008 Roger Federer tennis season
- 2008 Rafael Nadal tennis season
