= 2008 Roger Federer tennis season =

Statistics for Swiss tennis player

- Calendar prize money: $5,886,879

Singles
- Season record: 66–15 (81.48%)
- Calendar titles: 4
- Year-end ranking: #2
- Ranking change from previous year: ▼1

Grand Slam & significant results
- Australian Open: SF
- French Open: F
- Wimbledon: F
- US Open: W
- Other tournaments
- Tour Finals: RR
- Olympic Games: QF

Grand Slam doubles results
- Olympic Games: Gold Medal

Davis Cup
- Davis Cup: WG PO (adv. to 2009 WG)

Roger Federer won one major in 2008, the US Open, defeating Briton Andy Murray, 6–2, 7–5, 6–2. Federer was defeated by Rafael Nadal in two Grand Slam finals: at the French Open, which he lost 1–6, 3–6, 0–6, and at Wimbledon in a famous five-setter, 4–6, 4–6, 7–6, 7–6, 7–9, when he was aiming for six straight wins to break Björn Borg's record. At the Australian Open, Federer lost in the semifinals to Novak Djokovic, ending his record streak of 10 consecutive Major finals. Roger Federer lost twice in Master Series 1000 Finals on clay to Nadal at Monte Carlo and Hamburg. However, Federer was able to capture three more victories in 250-level events at Estoril, Halle, and Basel.

In doubles, Federer and compatriot Stanislas Wawrinka won the gold medal at the 2008 Summer Olympics.

== Year summary ==
=== Early hard court season ===
Federer began the year by attempting to defend his title at the Australian Open. Federer suffered an illness related to food poisoning prior to the start of the Australian Open. He lost, however, in the semifinals to eventual champion Djokovic, 5–7, 3–6, 6–7. This ended his record of ten consecutive Grand Slam finals, the most ever for a men's player.

In March, Federer revealed that he had recently been diagnosed with mononucleosis and that he may have suffered from it as early as December 2007. He noted, however, that he was now "medically cleared to compete". Despite being cleared to compete Federer admitted that he had suffered a significant dip in fitness due to his struggle with mononucleosis, which would prove to negatively impact his results till the Miami Masters in which he lost to long-time foe, Andy Roddick.

Although Federer was seeded first and was the defending champion at the Barclays Dubai Tennis Championships, he lost to Murray in the first round. On 10 March, Federer won his third exhibition match out of four against former world no. 1 Pete Sampras at Madison Square Garden in New York City, 6–3, 6–7, 7–6.

=== Clay court season ===
Federer began the clay-court season at the Estoril Open in Portugal. This was his first tournament with coach José Higueras. and his first non-Master Series clay-court tournament since Gstaad in 2004. Federer won his first tournament of the year, when Nikolay Davydenko retired from the final while trailing, 7–6, 1–2 with a leg ligament strain.

Federer then played three Masters Series tournaments on clay. At the Masters Series Monte Carlo, Federer lost to three-time defending champion Rafael Nadal in the final in straight sets. Federer made 44 unforced errors, lost a 4–0 lead in the second set, and fell to 1–7 against Nadal on clay courts. At the Internazionali BNL d'Italia, Federer lost in the quarterfinals to Radek Štěpánek. Federer was the defending champion at the Masters Series Hamburg, but lost to Nadal in the final.

At the French Open, Federer was defeated quickly by Nadal in the final, 1–6, 3–6, 0–6. This was the fourth consecutive year that Federer and Nadal had played at the French Open, with Federer losing his third consecutive final to Nadal. Federer's record of 23–4 (2005–08) at the French Open is second only to Nadal's record of 28–0 during the same period.

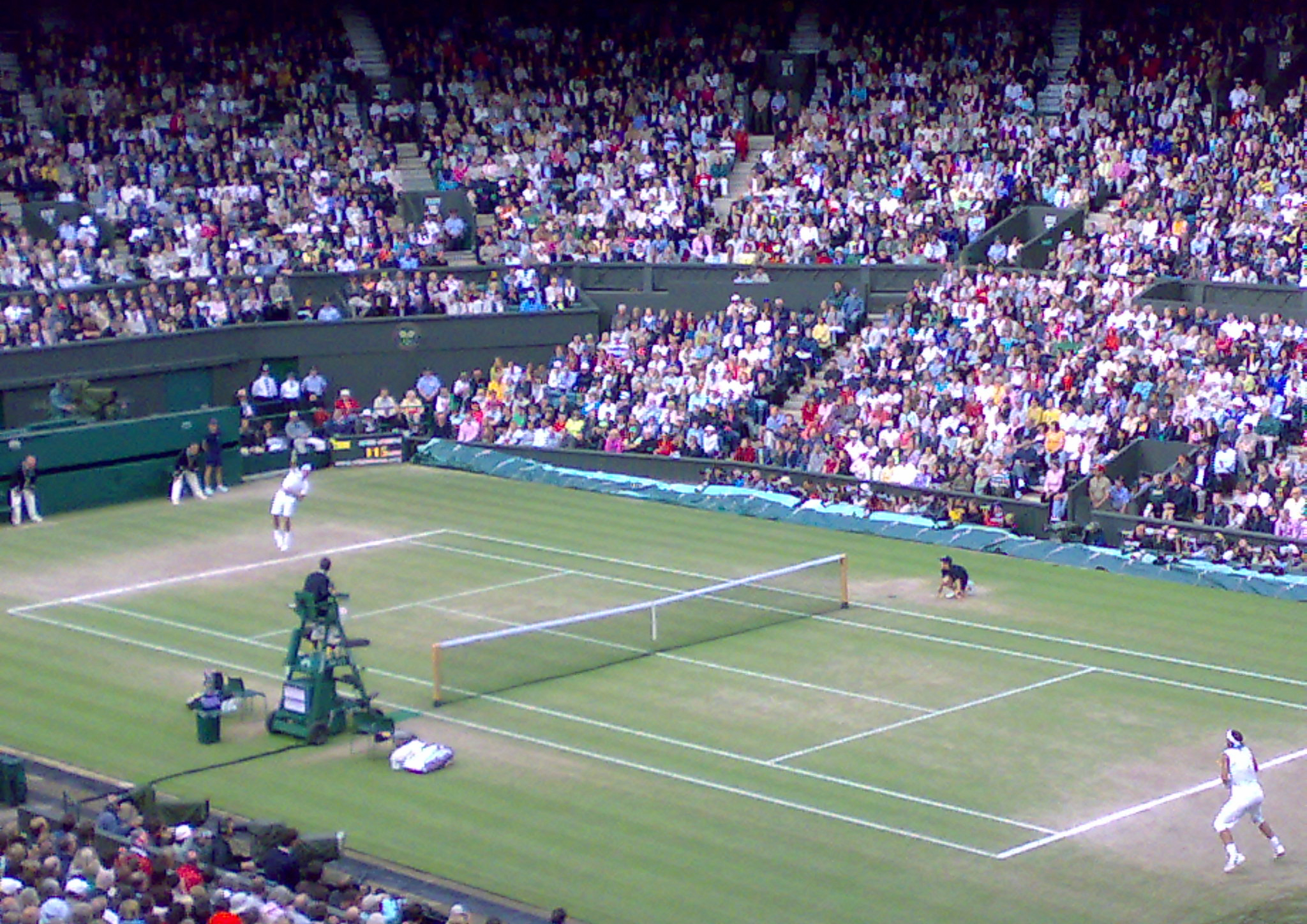
Federer serving for the third set against Nadal in the Wimbledon final

=== Grass court season ===
Federer bounced back by winning the Gerry Weber Open in Halle, Germany without dropping a set or a service game. This was the fifth time he had won this event. With this result, he tied Pete Sampras's record for most titles on grass in the open era with 10.

At Wimbledon, Federer once again played world no. 2 Nadal in the final. A victory for Federer would have meant his sixth consecutive Wimbledon singles title, breaking Borg's modern era men's record and equaling the all-time record held since 1886 by William Renshaw. Federer saved two championship points in the fourth set tiebreak, but eventually lost the match, 4–6, 4–6, 7–6, 7–6, 7–9. The rain-delayed match ended in near darkness after 4 hours, 48 minutes of play, making it the longest (in terms of elapsed time) men's final in Wimbledon recorded history. It concluded 7 hours, 15 minutes after its scheduled start. The defeat also ended Federer's 65-match winning streak on grass. John McEnroe described the match as "The greatest match I've ever seen." After Nadal surpassed him as world no. 1 later in the year, Federer stated that his main goal would be to regain the Wimbledon title, rather than the top spot.

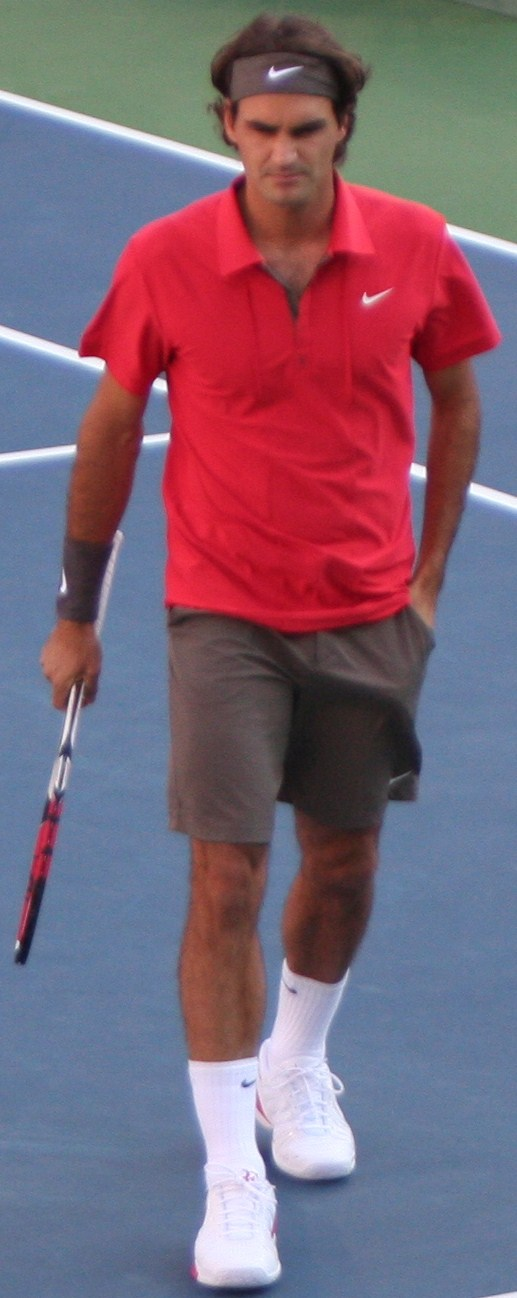
Federer at the 2008 US Open, where he won his fifth consecutive title.

=== Summer hard court season ===
Federer made early exits in his next two singles tournaments, the Rogers Cup in Toronto, Ontario, Canada and the Western & Southern Financial Group Masters in Cincinnati, Ohio. Federer was chosen to carry the national flag at the Beijing Olympics.

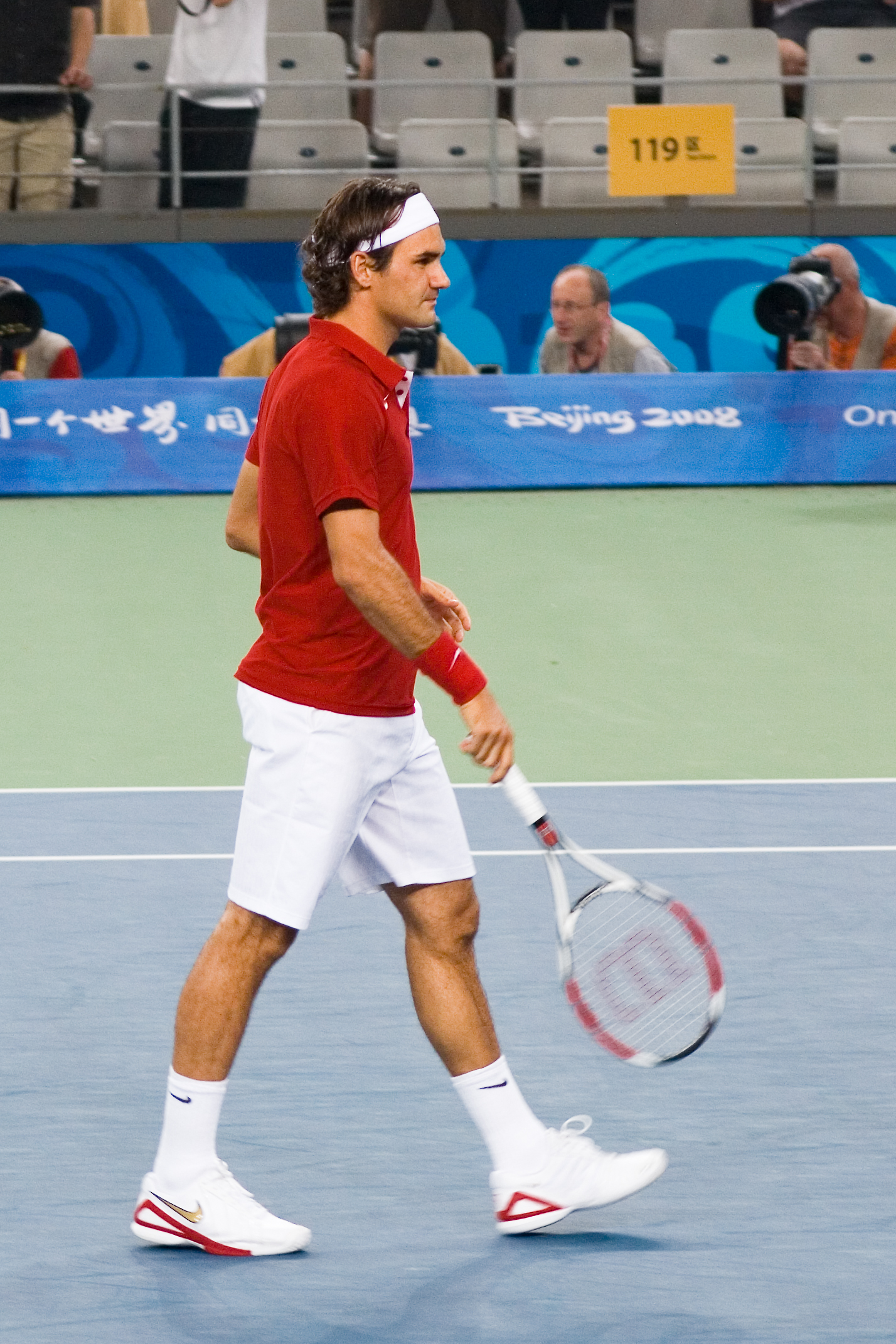
Federer at the 2008 Summer Olympics, where he won Doubles Gold.

At the Summer Olympics in Beijing, Federer lost in the quarterfinals to James Blake for the first time in their nine matches. Federer however, finally won his first Olympic gold medal in the men's doubles, when he and compatriot Stanislas Wawrinka upset the world no. 1 doubles team of Bob and Mike Bryan of the United States in the semifinals and defeated Sweden's Simon Aspelin and Thomas Johansson in the final, 6–3, 6–4, 6–7, 6–3. The following day, Federer lost his world no. 1 ranking to Nadal after 237 consecutive weeks.

At the US Open, Federer reached the fourth round without dropping a set. He defeated third-seeded Novak Djokovic in a rematch of the 2007 US Open Final, 6–3, 5–7, 7–5, 6–2, in the semifinals, and then defeated Andy Murray, who was playing in his first Grand Slam final, 6–2, 7–5, 6–2, to win his fifth straight US Open title and 13th career Grand Slam title, leaving him one Grand Slam title from tying Pete Sampras's all-time record of 14. This extended his US Open winning streak to 34 matches. Federer became the first player in tennis history to have five consecutive wins at both Wimbledon and the US Open.

=== Fall indoor season ===
At the Mutua Madrileña Masters Madrid, Federer reached the semifinals without losing a set. There he lost to Murray, 6–3, 3–6, 5–7. Meanwhile, he became the all-time leader in career prize money in men's tennis, earning over US$43.3 million at the end of the tournament and surpassing 14-time Grand Slam singles champion Pete Sampras.

Federer won his 57th career title at the Davidoff Swiss Indoors in Basel, beating David Nalbandian in the final. He became the only player in history to win the title three consecutive years.

He reached the quarterfinals of his next event, the BNP Paribas Masters in Paris, before withdrawing because of back pain. This was the first time in Federer's career of 763 matches that he had withdrawn from a tournament. This meant that 2008 was the first year since 2003 in which he did not win a Masters Series title. Federer entered the Tennis Masters Cup as the top-seeded player, after Nadal withdrew from the tournament. He drew Simon, Murray, and Roddick in the Red Group. In his opening match, Federer lost to Simon, but kept his hopes alive by defeating Roddick's replacement, Stepanek, in his second match. He lost his third match to Murray, 6–4, 6–7, 5–7. Federer had received medical treatment for back and hip problems in the third set, but lost after saving seven match points. However, Federer still ended the year ranked world no. 2.

=== Matches ===
==== Grand Slam performance ====
Tournament	Round	Result	Opponent	Score
Australian Open	1R	Win	(Argentina) Diego Hartfield	6–0, 6–3, 6–0
Australian Open	2R	Win	(France) Fabrice Santoro	6–1, 6–2, 6–0
Australian Open	3R	Win	(Serbia) Janko Tipsarević	6–7^{(5–7)}, 7–6^{(7–1)}, 5–7, 6–1, 10–8
Australian Open	4R	Win	(Czech Republic) Tomáš Berdych	6–4, 7–6^{(7–9)}, 6–3
Australian Open	QF	Win	(United States) James Blake	7–5, 7–6^{(7–5)}, 6–4
Australian Open	SF	Loss	(Serbia) Novak Djokovic	5–7, 3–6, 6–7^{(5–7)}
French Open	1R	Win	(United States) Sam Querrey	6–4, 6–4, 6–3
French Open	2R	Win	(Spain) Albert Montañés	6–7^{(5–7)}, 6–1, 6–0, 6–4
French Open	3R	Win	(Croatia) Mario Ančić	6–3, 6–4, 6–2
French Open	4R	Win	(France) Julien Benneteau	6–4, 7–5, 7–5
French Open	QF	Win	(Chile) Fernando González	2–6, 6–2, 6–3, 6–4
French Open	SF	Win	(France) Gaël Monfils	6–2, 5–7, 6–3, 7–5
French Open	F	Loss	(Spain) Rafael Nadal	1–6, 3–6, 0–6
Wimbledon	1R	Win	(Slovakia) Dominik Hrbatý	6–3, 6–2, 6–2
Wimbledon	2R	Win	(Sweden) Robin Söderling	6–3, 6–4, 7–6^{(7–3)}
Wimbledon	3R	Win	(France) Marc Gicquel	6–3, 6–3, 6–1
Wimbledon	4R	Win	(Australia) Lleyton Hewitt	7–6^{(9–7)}, 6–2, 6–4
Wimbledon	QF	Win	(Croatia) Mario Ančić	6–1, 7–5, 6–4
Wimbledon	SF	Win	(Russia) Marat Safin	6–3, 7–6^{(7–3)}, 6–4
Wimbledon	F	Loss	(Spain) Rafael Nadal	4–6, 4–6, 7–6^{(7–5)}, 7–6^{(10–8)}, 7–9
US Open	1R	Win	(Argentina) Máximo González	6–3, 6–0, 6–3
US Open	2R	Win	(Brazil) Thiago Alves	6–3, 7–5, 6–4
US Open	3R	Win	(Czech Republic) Radek Štěpánek	6–3, 6–3, 6–2
US Open	4R	Win	(Russia) Igor Andreev	6–7^{(6–8)}, 7–6^{(7–5)}, 6–3, 3–6, 6–3
US Open	QF	Win	(Luxembourg) Gilles Müller	7–6^{(7–5)}, 6–4, 7–6^{(7–5)}
US Open	SF	Win	(Serbia) Novak Djokovic	6–3, 5–7, 7–5, 6–2
US Open	F	Win (13)	(United Kingdom) Andy Murray	6–2, 7–5, 6–2

==== All matches ====
===== Singles =====
Match	Tournament	Start; Date	Type	I/O	Surface	Round	Opponent/Rank	Result	Score
686	(Australia) Australian Open	1/14	GS	Outdoor	Hard	R128	(Argentina) Diego Hartfield	W	6–0, 6–3, 6–0
687	(Australia) Australian Open	1/14	GS	Outdoor	Hard	R64	(France) Fabrice Santoro	W	6–1, 6–2, 6–0
688	(Australia) Australian Open	1/14	GS	Outdoor	Hard	R32	(Serbia) Janko Tipsarevic	W	6–7(5), 7–6(1), 5–7, 6–1, 10–8
689	(Australia) Australian Open	1/14	GS	Outdoor	Hard	R16	(Czech Republic) Tomas Berdych	W	6–4, 7–6(7), 6–3
690	(Australia) Australian Open	1/14	GS	Outdoor	Hard	Q	(United States) James Blake	W	7–5, 7–6(5), 6–4
691	(Australia) Australian Open	1/14	GS	Outdoor	Hard	S	(Serbia) Novak Djokovic	L	5–7, 3–6, 6–7(5)
692	(United Arab Emirates) Dubai	3/3	500	Outdoor	Hard	R32	(United Kingdom) Andy Murray	L	7–6(6), 3–6, 4–6
–	(United States) Indian Wells Masters	3/13	1000	Outdoor	Hard	R128	Bye		
693	(United States) Indian Wells Masters	3/13	1000	Outdoor	Hard	R64	(Spain) Guillermo Garcia-Lopez	W	6–3, 6–2
694	(United States) Indian Wells Masters	3/13	1000	Outdoor	Hard	R32	(France) Nicolas Mahut	W	6–1, 6–1
695	(United States) Indian Wells Masters	3/13	1000	Outdoor	Hard	R16	(Croatia) Ivan Ljubicic	W	6–3, 6–4
–	(United States) Indian Wells Masters	3/13	1000	Outdoor	Hard	Q	(Germany) Tommy Haas	W/O	N/A
696	(United States) Indian Wells Masters	3/13	1000	Outdoor	Hard	S	(United States) Mardy Fish	L	3–6, 2–6
–	(United States) Miami Masters	3/27	1000	Outdoor	Hard	R128	Bye		
697	(United States) Miami Masters	3/27	1000	Outdoor	Hard	R64	(France) Gael Monfils	W	6–3, 6–4
698	(United States) Miami Masters	3/27	1000	Outdoor	Hard	R32	(Sweden) Robin Soderling	W	6–4, 3–0 RET
699	(United States) Miami Masters	3/27	1000	Outdoor	Hard	R16	(Argentina) Jose Acasuso	W	7–6(5), 6–2
700	(United States) Miami Masters	3/27	1000	Outdoor	Hard	Q	(United States) Andy Roddick	L	6–7(4), 6–4, 3–6
701	(Portugal) Estoril	4/14	250	Outdoor	Clay	R32	(Belgium) Olivier Rochus	W	4–6, 6–3, 6–2
702	(Portugal) Estoril	4/14	250	Outdoor	Clay	R16	(Romania) Victor Hanescu	W	6–3, 6–2
703	(Portugal) Estoril	4/14	250	Outdoor	Clay	Q	(Portugal) Frederico Gil	W	6–4, 6–1
704	(Portugal) Estoril	4/14	250	Outdoor	Clay	S	(Germany) Denis Gremelmayr	W	2–6, 7–5, 6–1
705	(Portugal) Estoril	4/14	250	Outdoor	Clay	Win (1)	(Russia) Nikolay Davydenko	W	7–6(5), 1–2 RET
–	(Monaco) Monte Carlo Masters	4/20	1000	Outdoor	Clay	R64	Bye		
706	(Monaco) Monte Carlo Masters	4/20	1000	Outdoor	Clay	R32	(Spain) Ruben Ramirez Hidalgo	W	6–1, 3–6, 7–6(1)
707	(Monaco) Monte Carlo Masters	4/20	1000	Outdoor	Clay	R16	(France) Gael Monfils	W	6–3, 6–4
708	(Monaco) Monte Carlo Masters	4/20	1000	Outdoor	Clay	Q	(Argentina) David Nalbandian	W	5–7, 6–2, 6–2
709	(Monaco) Monte Carlo Masters	4/20	1000	Outdoor	Clay	S	(Serbia) Novak Djokovic	W	6–3, 3–2 RET
710	(Monaco) Monte Carlo Masters	4/20	1000	Outdoor	Clay	F	(Spain) Rafael Nadal	L	5–7, 5–7
–	(Italy) Rome Masters	5/5	1000	Outdoor	Clay	R64	Bye		
711	(Italy) Rome Masters	5/5	1000	Outdoor	Clay	R32	(Argentina) Guillermo Canas	W	6–3, 6–3
712	(Italy) Rome Masters	5/5	1000	Outdoor	Clay	R16	(Croatia) Ivo Karlovic	W	7–6(4), 6–3
713	(Italy) Rome Masters	5/5	1000	Outdoor	Clay	Q	(Czech Republic) Radek Stepanek	L	6–7(4), 6–7(7)
–	(Germany) Hamburg Masters	5/11	1000	Outdoor	Clay	R64	Bye		
714	(Germany) Hamburg Masters	5/11	1000	Outdoor	Clay	R32	(Finland) Jarkko Nieminen	W	6–1, 6–3
715	(Germany) Hamburg Masters	5/11	1000	Outdoor	Clay	R16	(Sweden) Robin Soderling	W	6–3, 6–2
716	(Germany) Hamburg Masters	5/11	1000	Outdoor	Clay	Q	(Spain) Fernando Verdasco	W	6–3, 6–3
717	(Germany) Hamburg Masters	5/11	1000	Outdoor	Clay	S	(Italy) Andreas Seppi	W	6–3, 6–1
718	(Germany) Hamburg Masters	5/11	1000	Outdoor	Clay	F	(Spain) Rafael Nadal	L	5–7, 7–6(3), 3–6
719	(France) Roland Garros	5/25	GS	Outdoor	Clay	R128	(United States) Sam Querrey	W	6–4, 6–4, 6–3
720	(France) Roland Garros	5/25	GS	Outdoor	Clay	R64	(Spain) Albert Montanes	W	6–7(5), 6–1, 6–0, 6–4
721	(France) Roland Garros	5/25	GS	Outdoor	Clay	R32	(Croatia) Mario Ancic	W	6–3, 6–4, 6–2
722	(France) Roland Garros	5/25	GS	Outdoor	Clay	R16	(France) Julien Benneteau	W	6–4, 7–5, 7–5
723	(France) Roland Garros	5/25	GS	Outdoor	Clay	Q	(Chile) Fernando Gonzalez	W	2–6, 6–2, 6–3, 6–4
724	(France) Roland Garros	5/25	GS	Outdoor	Clay	S	(France) Gael Monfils	W	6–2, 5–7, 6–3, 7–5
725	(France) Roland Garros	5/25	GS	Outdoor	Clay	F	(Spain) Rafael Nadal	L	1–6, 3–6, 0–6
726	(Germany) Halle	6/9	250	Outdoor	Grass	R32	(Germany) Michael Berrer	W	6–4, 6–2
727	(Germany) Halle	6/9	250	Outdoor	Grass	R16	(Czech Republic) Jan Vacek	W	7–5, 6–3
728	(Germany) Halle	6/9	250	Outdoor	Grass	Q	(Cyprus) Marcos Baghdatis	W	6–4, 6–4
729	(Germany) Halle	6/9	250	Outdoor	Grass	S	(Germany) Nicolas Kiefer	W	6–1, 6–4
730	(Germany) Halle	6/9	250	Outdoor	Grass	Win (2)	(Germany) Philipp Kohlschreiber	W	6–3, 6–4
731	(United Kingdom) Wimbledon	6/23	GS	Outdoor	Grass	R128	(Slovakia) Dominik Hrbaty	W	6–3, 6–2, 6–2
732	(United Kingdom) Wimbledon	6/23	GS	Outdoor	Grass	R64	(Sweden) Robin Soderling	W	6–3, 6–4, 7–6(3)
733	(United Kingdom) Wimbledon	6/23	GS	Outdoor	Grass	R32	(France) Marc Gicquel	W	6–3, 6–3, 6–1
734	(United Kingdom) Wimbledon	6/23	GS	Outdoor	Grass	R16	(Australia) Lleyton Hewitt	W	7–6(7), 6–2, 6–4
735	(United Kingdom) Wimbledon	6/23	GS	Outdoor	Grass	Q	(Croatia) Mario Ancic	W	6–1, 7–5, 6–4
736	(United Kingdom) Wimbledon	6/23	GS	Outdoor	Grass	S	(Russia) Marat Safin	W	6–3, 7–6(3), 6–4
737	(United Kingdom) Wimbledon	6/23	GS	Outdoor	Grass	F	(Spain) Rafael Nadal	L	4–6, 4–6, 7–6(5), 7–6(8), 7–9
–	Canada Masters	7/21	1000	Outdoor	Hard	R64	Bye		
738	Canada Masters	7/21	1000	Outdoor	Hard	R32	(France) Gilles Simon	L	6–2, 5–7, 4–6
–	(United States) Cincinnati Masters	7/28	1000	Outdoor	Hard	R64	Bye		
739	(United States) Cincinnati Masters	7/28	1000	Outdoor	Hard	R32	(United States) Robby Ginepri	W	6–7(2), 7–6(5), 6–0
740	(United States) Cincinnati Masters	7/28	1000	Outdoor	Hard	R16	(Croatia) Ivo Karlovic	L	6–7(6), 6–4, 6–7(5)
741	(China) Beijing Olympics	8/11	OL	Outdoor	Hard	R64	(Russia) Dmitry Tursunov	W	6–4, 6–2
742	(China) Beijing Olympics	8/11	OL	Outdoor	Hard	R32	(El Salvador) Rafael Arevalo	W	6–2, 6–4
743	(China) Beijing Olympics	8/11	OL	Outdoor	Hard	R16	(Czech Republic) Tomas Berdych	W	6–3, 7–6(4)
744	(China) Beijing Olympics	8/11	OL	Outdoor	Hard	Q	(United States) James Blake	L	4–6, 6–7(2)
745	(United States) US Open	8/25	GS	Outdoor	Hard	R128	(Argentina) Maximo Gonzalez	W	6–3, 6–0, 6–3
746	(United States) US Open	8/25	GS	Outdoor	Hard	R64	(Brazil) Thiago Alves	W	6–3, 7–5, 6–4
747	(United States) US Open	8/25	GS	Outdoor	Hard	R32	(Czech Republic) Radek Stepanek	W	6–3, 6–3, 6–2
748	(United States) US Open	8/25	GS	Outdoor	Hard	R16	(Russia) Igor Andreev	W	6–7(5), 7–6(5), 6–3, 3–6, 6–3
749	(United States) US Open	8/25	GS	Outdoor	Hard	Q	(Luxembourg) Gilles Muller	W	7–6(5), 6–4, 7–6(5)
750	(United States) US Open	8/25	GS	Outdoor	Hard	S	(Serbia) Novak Djokovic	W	6–3, 5–7, 7–5, 6–2
751	(United States) US Open	8/25	GS	Outdoor	Hard	Win (3)	(United Kingdom) Andy Murray	W	6–2, 7–5, 6–2
752	(Switzerland) SUI v. BEL WG Play-offs	9/19	DC	Indoor	Hard	RR	(Belgium) Kristof Vliegen	W	7–6(1), 6–4, 6–2
–	(Spain) Madrid Masters	10/12	1000	Indoor	Hard	R64	Bye		
753	(Spain) Madrid Masters	10/12	1000	Indoor	Hard	R32	(Czech Republic) Radek Stepanek	W	6–3, 7–6(6)
754	(Spain) Madrid Masters	10/12	1000	Indoor	Hard	R16	(France) Jo-Wilfried Tsonga	W	6–4, 6–1
755	(Spain) Madrid Masters	10/12	1000	Indoor	Hard	Q	(Argentina) Juan Martin Del Potro	W	6–3, 6–3
756	(Spain) Madrid Masters	10/12	1000	Indoor	Hard	S	(United Kingdom) Andy Murray	L	6–3, 3–6, 5–7
757	(Switzerland) Basel	10/20	250	Indoor	Hard	R32	(United States) Bobby Reynolds	W	6–3, 6–7(6), 6–3
758	(Switzerland) Basel	10/20	250	Indoor	Hard	R16	(Finland) Jarkko Nieminen	W	7–6(6), 7–6(1)
759	(Switzerland) Basel	10/20	250	Indoor	Hard	Q	(Italy) Simone Bolelli	W	6–2, 6–3
760	(Switzerland) Basel	10/20	250	Indoor	Hard	S	(Spain) Feliciano Lopez	W	6–3, 6–2
761	(Switzerland) Basel	10/20	250	Indoor	Hard	Win (4)	(Argentina) David Nalbandian	W	6–3, 6–4
–	(France) Paris Masters	10/26	1000	Indoor	Hard	R64	Bye		
762	(France) Paris Masters	10/26	1000	Indoor	Hard	R32	(Sweden) Robin Soderling	W	6–4, 7–6(7)
763	(France) Paris Masters	10/26	1000	Indoor	Hard	R16	(Croatia) Marin Cilic	W	6–3, 6–4
–	(France) Paris Masters	10/26	1000	Indoor	Hard	Q	(United States) James Blake	Withdrew	
764	(China) Tennis Masters Cup	11/9	WC	Indoor	Hard	RR	(France) Gilles Simon	L	6–4, 4–6, 3–6
765	(China) Tennis Masters Cup	11/9	WC	Indoor	Hard	RR	(Czech Republic) Radek Stepanek	W	7–6(4), 6–4
766	(China) Tennis Masters Cup	11/9	WC	Indoor	Hard	RR	(United Kingdom) Andy Murray	L	6–4, 6–7(3), 5–7

===== Doubles =====
Tournament	Match	Round	Opponents (seed or key)	Ranks	Result	Score
Rogers Cup; Toronto, Ontario, Canada; ATP 1000; Hard, outdoor 21 – 27 July 2008; Partner: (Switzerland) Stanislas Wawrinka
Rogers Cup; Toronto, Ontario, Canada; ATP 1000; Hard, outdoor 21 – 27 July 2008; Partner: (Switzerland) Stanislas Wawrinka	1	1R	(France) Julien Benneteau / (Canada) Frédéric Niemeyer (WC)	30 / 399	Win	6–4, 6–4
Rogers Cup; Toronto, Ontario, Canada; ATP 1000; Hard, outdoor 21 – 27 July 2008; Partner: (Switzerland) Stanislas Wawrinka	2	1R	(Czech Republic) Lukáš Dlouhý / (India) Leander Paes (7)	14 / 15	Loss	4–6, 4–6
2008 Summer Olympics; Beijing, China; Olympics; Hard, outdoor 11 – 17 August 2008; Partner: (Switzerland) Stanislas Wawrinka
2008 Summer Olympics; Beijing, China; Olympics; Hard, outdoor 11 – 17 August 2008; Partner: (Switzerland) Stanislas Wawrinka	3	1R	(Italy) Simone Bolelli / (Italy) Andreas Seppi	138 / 150	Win	7–5, 6–1
2008 Summer Olympics; Beijing, China; Olympics; Hard, outdoor 11 – 17 August 2008; Partner: (Switzerland) Stanislas Wawrinka	4	2R	(Russia) Dmitry Tursunov / (Russia) Mikhail Youzhny (Alt)	40 / 77	Win	6–4, 6–3
2008 Summer Olympics; Beijing, China; Olympics; Hard, outdoor 11 – 17 August 2008; Partner: (Switzerland) Stanislas Wawrinka	5	QF	(India) Mahesh Bhupathi / (India) Leander Paes (7)	13 / 15	Win	6–2, 6–4
2008 Summer Olympics; Beijing, China; Olympics; Hard, outdoor 11 – 17 August 2008; Partner: (Switzerland) Stanislas Wawrinka	6	SF	(United States) Bob Bryan / (United States) Mike Bryan (1)	2 / 2	Win	7–6^{(8–6)}, 6–4
2008 Summer Olympics; Beijing, China; Olympics; Hard, outdoor 11 – 17 August 2008; Partner: (Switzerland) Stanislas Wawrinka	7	W	(Sweden) Simon Aspelin / (Sweden) Thomas Johansson	9 / 116	Win (1)	6–3, 6–4, 6–7^{(4–7)}, 6–3
Davis Cup, World Group play-offs Lausanne, Switzerland; Davis Cup; Hard, indoor 19 – 21 September 2008; Partner: (Switzerland) Stanislas Wawrinka
Davis Cup, World Group play-offs Lausanne, Switzerland; Davis Cup; Hard, indoor 19 – 21 September 2008; Partner: (Switzerland) Stanislas Wawrinka	8	PO; 3R	(Belgium) Xavier Malisse / (Belgium) Olivier Rochus	177 / 105	Win	4–6, 7–6^{(8–6)}, 6–3, 6–3

Source (ATP)

== Yearly records ==
=== Finals ===
==== Singles: 8 (4–4) ====
Legend Grand Slam (1–2) ATP World Tour Finals (0–0) ATP World Tour Masters 1000 (0–2) ATP World Tour 500 Series (0–0) ATP World Tour 250 Series (3–0)	Titles by surface Hard (2–0) Clay (1–3) Grass (1–1)	Titles by surface Outdoors (3–4) Indoors (1–0)

Result	No.	Date	Tournament	Surface	Opponents	Score
Win	54.	20 April 2008	Portugal Open, Portugal	Clay	(Russia) Nikolay Davydenko	7–6^{(7–5)}, 1–2 ret.
Loss	18.	27 April 2008	Monte-Carlo Masters, France	Clay	(Spain) Rafael Nadal	5–7, 5–7
Loss	19.	18 May 2008	Hamburg Masters, Germany	Clay	(Spain) Rafael Nadal	5–7, 7–6^{(7–3)}, 3–6
Loss	20.	8 June 2008	French Open, France	Clay	(Spain) Rafael Nadal	1–6, 3–6, 0–6
Win	55.	15 June 2008	Halle Open, Germany (5)	Grass	(Germany) Philipp Kohlschreiber	6–3, 6–4
Loss	21.	6 July 2008	Wimbledon, England, UK	Grass	(Spain) Rafael Nadal	4–6, 4–6, 7–6^{(7–5)}, 7–6^{(10–8)}, 7–9
Win	56.	8 September 2008	US Open, United States (5)	Hard	(United Kingdom) Andy Murray	6–2, 7–5, 6–2
Win	57.	26 October 2008	Swiss Indoors, Switzerland (3)	Hard (i)	(Argentina) David Nalbandian	6–3, 6–4

== See also ==
- Roger Federer
- Roger Federer career statistics
- 2008 Rafael Nadal tennis season
- 2008 Novak Djokovic tennis season
