= 2008 Davis Cup World Group =

- Date: 8 February – 23 November
- Edition: 28th

Champions
- Spain
← 2007 ·	Davis Cup	· 2009 →

The World Group was the highest level of Davis Cup competition in 2008. The first-round losers went into the Davis Cup World Group play-offs, and the winners progress to the quarterfinals. The quarterfinalists were guaranteed a World Group spot for 2009.

== Participating teams ==
Participating teams
Argentina	Austria	Belgium	Czech Republic
France	Great Britain	Germany	Israel
Peru	Romania	Russia	Serbia
South Korea	Spain	Sweden	United States

== Draw ==
First round 8–10 February
Moscow, Russia (indoor hard)
1	Russia	3
Serbia	2
Ostrava, Czech Republic (indoor carpet)
8	Belgium	2
Czech Republic	3
Buenos Aires, Argentina (clay)
3	Argentina	4
Great Britain	1
Ramat HaSharon, Israel (hard)
6	Sweden	3
Israel	2
Braunschweig, Germany (indoor clay)
South Korea	2
4	Germany	3
Lima, Peru (clay)
Peru	0
5	Spain	5
Sibiu, Romania (indoor hard)
Romania	0
7	France	5
Vienna, Austria (indoor clay)
Austria	1
2	United States	4

Quarterfinals; 11–13 April
Moscow, Russia (indoor clay)
1	Russia	3
Czech Republic	2
Buenos Aires, Argentina (clay)
3	Argentina	4
6	Sweden	1
Bremen, Germany (indoor hard)
4	Germany	1
5	Spain	4
Winston-Salem, United States (indoor hard)
7	France	1
2	United States	4

Semifinals; 19–21 September
Buenos Aires, Argentina (clay)
1	Russia	2
3	Argentina	3
Madrid, Spain (clay)
5	Spain	4
2	United States	1

Final; 21–23 November
Mar del Plata, Argentina (indoor hard)
3	Argentina	1
5	Spain	3

== First round ==
=== Russia vs. Serbia ===
Russia
3
Luzhniki Palace of Sports, Moscow, Russia
8-10 February 2008
Hard (i)

Serbia
2

			1	2	3	4	5
1	(Russia) (Serbia)	Mikhail Youzhny; Nenad Zimonjić	2; 6	6; 3	6; 2	6; 4
2	(Russia) (Serbia)	Nikolay Davydenko; Viktor Troicki	6; 1	1; 6	6; 3	1; 6	6; 2
3	(Russia) (Serbia)	Mikhail Youzhny / Dmitry Tursunov; Novak Djokovic / Nenad Zimonjić	3; 6	6^{6} 7^{8}	6^{5} 7^{7}
4	(Russia) (Serbia)	Nikolay Davydenko; Novak Djokovic	4; 6	3; 6	6; 4			retired
5	(Russia) (Serbia)	Dmitry Tursunov; Viktor Troicki	6^{7} 7^{9}	6; 4	3; 6

=== Czech Republic vs. Belgium ===
Czech Republic
3
ČEZ Aréna, Ostrava, Czech Republic
8-10 February 2008
Carpet (i)

Belgium
2

			1	2	3	4	5
1	(Czech Republic) (Belgium)	Tomáš Berdych; Kristof Vliegen	6; 3	6; 1	6; 4
2	(Czech Republic) (Belgium)	Radek Štěpánek; Steve Darcis	6; 4	7^{7} 6^{4}	7^{7} 6^{5}
3	(Czech Republic) (Belgium)	Tomáš Berdych / Radek Štěpánek; Kristof Vliegen / Olivier Rochus	6^{2} 7^{7}	7^{8} 6^{6}	7; 5	5; 7	6; 4
4	(Czech Republic) (Belgium)	Lukáš Dlouhý; Steve Darcis	6^{1} 7^{7}	4; 6
5	(Czech Republic) (Belgium)	Pavel Vízner; Ruben Bemelmans	7^{7} 6^{4}	5; 7	2; 2			retired

=== Argentina vs. Great Britain ===
Argentina
4
Estadio Parque Roca, Buenos Aires, Argentina
8-10 February 2008
Clay

Great Britain
1

			1	2	3	4	5
1	(Argentina) (United Kingdom)	David Nalbandian; Jamie Baker	6; 1	6; 3	6; 3
2	(Argentina) (United Kingdom)	Agustín Calleri; Alex Bogdanovic	6; 3	6; 1	6; 1
3	(Argentina) (United Kingdom)	José Acasuso / David Nalbandian; Ross Hutchins / Jamie Murray	6; 2	7^{13} 6^{11}	6; 0
4	(Argentina) (United Kingdom)	José Acasuso; Alex Bogdanovic	7; 5	7; 5
5	(Argentina) (United Kingdom)	Agustín Calleri; Jamie Baker	6^{4} 7^{7}	4; 6

=== Israel vs. Sweden ===
Israel
2
Canada Stadium, Ramat HaSharon, Israel
8-10 February 2008
Hard

Sweden
3

			1	2	3	4	5
1	(Israel) (Sweden)	Dudi Sela; Jonas Björkman	7^{10} 6^{8}	6; 3	6; 1
2	(Israel) (Sweden)	Harel Levy; Thomas Johansson	1; 6	1; 6	3; 6
3	(Israel) (Sweden)	Jonathan Erlich / Andy Ram; Simon Aspelin / Robert Lindstedt	6; 3	7^{7} 6^{3}	7; 5
4	(Israel) (Sweden)	Dudi Sela; Thomas Johansson	6^{6} 7^{8}	1; 6	5; 7
5	(Israel) (Sweden)	Harel Levy; Jonas Björkman	6; 0	4; 6	3; 6	6^{6} 7^{8}

=== Germany vs. South Korea ===
Germany
3
Volkswagen Halle, Braunschweig, Germany
8-10 February 2008
Clay (i)

South Korea
2

			1	2	3	4	5
1	(Germany) (South Korea)	Philipp Kohlschreiber; An Jae-sung	6; 2	6; 2	6; 2
2	(Germany) (South Korea)	Florian Mayer; Hyung-Taik Lee	5; 7	3; 6	6; 1	7^{9} 6^{7}	3; 6
3	(Germany) (South Korea)	Philipp Kohlschreiber / Philipp Petzschner; Woong-Sun Jun / An Jae-sung	6; 1	6; 3	6; 3
4	(Germany) (South Korea)	Philipp Kohlschreiber; Hyung-Taik Lee	6; 0	4; 6	6; 1	7^{7} 6^{1}
5	(Germany) (South Korea)	Michael Berrer; Woong-Sun Jun	1; 6	6; 3	4; 6

=== Peru vs. Spain ===
Peru
0
Jockey Club de Peru, Lima, Peru
8-10 February 2008
Clay

Spain
5

			1	2	3	4	5
1	(Peru) (Spain)	Matías Silva; Nicolás Almagro	3; 6	5; 7	0; 6
2	(Peru) (Spain)	Iván Miranda; Tommy Robredo	2; 6	3; 6	3; 6
3	(Peru) (Spain)	Luis Horna / Iván Miranda; Feliciano López / Fernando Verdasco	3; 6	4; 6	6^{4} 7^{7}
4	(Peru) (Spain)	Mauricio Echazú; Tommy Robredo	4; 6	1; 6
5	(Peru) (Spain)	Iván Miranda; Nicolás Almagro	2; 6	3; 6

=== Romania vs. France ===
Romania
0
Sala Transilvania, Sibiu, Romania
8-10 February 2008
Hard (i)

France
5

			1	2	3	4	5
1	(Romania) (France)	Victor Hănescu; Richard Gasquet	6^{5} 7^{7}	4; 6	5; 7
2	(Romania) (France)	Andrei Pavel; Jo-Wilfried Tsonga	7^{7} 6^{2}	4; 6	4; 6	4; 6
3	(Romania) (France)	Florin Mergea / Horia Tecău; Arnaud Clément / Michaël Llodra	3; 6	4; 6	7^{8} 6^{6}	6; 3	2; 6
4	(Romania) (France)	Andrei Pavel; Michaël Llodra	6^{5} 7^{7}	6^{7} 7^{9}
5	(Romania) (France)	Horia Tecău; Arnaud Clément	6^{3} 7^{7}	6; 2	4; 6

=== Austria vs. United States ===
Austria
1
Ferry-Dusika-Hallenstadion, Vienna, Austria
8-10 February 2008
Clay (i)

United States
4

			1	2	3	4	5
1	(Austria) (United States)	Jürgen Melzer; Andy Roddick	4; 6	6; 4	3; 6	7^{7} 6^{4}	3; 6
2	(Austria) (United States)	Stefan Koubek; James Blake	7; 5	5; 7	2; 6	2; 6
3	(Austria) (United States)	Julian Knowle / Jürgen Melzer; Bob Bryan / Mike Bryan	1; 6	4; 6	2; 6
4	(Austria) (United States)	Stefan Koubek; Mike Bryan	7; 5	1; 0				retired
5	(Austria) (United States)	Werner Eschauer; Bob Bryan	0; 6	6; 3	6^{3} 7^{7}

== Quarterfinals ==
=== Russia vs. Czech Republic ===
Russia
3
Luzhniki Palace of Sports, Moscow, Russia
11-13 April 2008
Clay (i)

Czech Republic
2

			1	2	3	4	5
1	(Russia) (Czech Republic)	Marat Safin; Tomáš Berdych	6^{5} 7^{7}	4; 6	6; 3	6; 2	6; 4
2	(Russia) (Czech Republic)	Igor Andreev; Radek Štěpánek	3; 6	2; 6	4; 6
3	(Russia) (Czech Republic)	Igor Andreev / Nikolay Davydenko; Radek Štěpánek / Pavel Vízner	3; 6	6; 3	7; 5	6; 4
4	(Russia) (Czech Republic)	Nikolay Davydenko; Tomáš Berdych	6; 3	2; 6	6^{5} 7^{7}	6; 3	1; 2	retired
5	(Russia) (Czech Republic)	Marat Safin; Lukáš Dlouhý	3; 6	3; 6

=== Argentina vs. Sweden ===
Argentina
4
Estadio Parque Roca, Buenos Aires, Argentina
11-13 April 2008
Clay

Sweden
1

			1	2	3	4	5
1	(Argentina) (Sweden)	David Nalbandian; Thomas Johansson	6; 2	5; 7	6; 4	6; 2
2	(Argentina) (Sweden)	José Acasuso; Robin Söderling	0; 6	4; 6	1; 6
3	(Argentina) (Sweden)	Guillermo Cañas / David Nalbandian; Jonas Björkman / Robert Lindstedt	7; 5	6; 4	6; 4
4	(Argentina) (Sweden)	David Nalbandian; Robin Söderling	6; 4	1; 6	4; 6	6; 4	9; 7
5	(Argentina) (Sweden)	Juan Mónaco; Thomas Johansson	6; 3	6; 3

=== Germany vs. Spain ===
Germany
1
AWD Dome, Bremen, Germany
11-13 April 2008
Hard (i)

Spain
4

			1	2	3	4	5
1	(Germany) (Spain)	Nicolas Kiefer; Rafael Nadal	6^{5} 7^{7}	0; 6	3; 6
2	(Germany) (Spain)	Philipp Kohlschreiber; David Ferrer	7^{7} 6^{3}	3; 6	4; 6	2; 6
3	(Germany) (Spain)	Philipp Kohlschreiber / Philipp Petzschner; Feliciano López / Fernando Verdasco	7^{7} 6^{3}	6^{1} 7^{7}	4; 6	6; 2	10; 12
4	(Germany) (Spain)	Michael Berrer; Fernando Verdasco	6; 2	6^{5} 7^{7}	4; 6
5	(Germany) (Spain)	Nicolas Kiefer; Feliciano López	6; 4	7^{7} 6^{2}

=== United States vs. France ===
United States
4
Joel Coliseum, Winston-Salem, United States
11-13 April 2008
Hard (i)

France
1

			1	2	3	4	5
1	(United States) (France)	Andy Roddick; Michaël Llodra	6; 4	7^{7} 6^{3}	7^{7} 6^{5}
2	(United States) (France)	James Blake; Paul-Henri Mathieu	7^{7} 6^{5}	6^{3} 7^{7}	6; 3	3; 6	7; 5
3	(United States) (France)	Bob Bryan / Mike Bryan; Arnaud Clément / Michaël Llodra	7^{9} 6^{7}	5; 7	3; 6	4; 6
4	(United States) (France)	Andy Roddick; Paul-Henri Mathieu	6; 2	6; 3	6; 2
5	(United States) (France)	James Blake; Richard Gasquet	6^{4} 7^{7}	6; 4	6; 4

== Semifinals ==
=== Argentina vs. Russia ===
Argentina
3
Estadio Parque Roca, Buenos Aires, Argentina
19-21 September 2008
Clay

Russia
2

			1	2	3	4	5
1	(Argentina) (Russia)	David Nalbandian; Igor Andreev	7^{7} 6^{5}	6; 2	6; 4
2	(Argentina) (Russia)	Juan Martín del Potro; Nikolay Davydenko	6; 1	6; 4	6; 2
3	(Argentina) (Russia)	Guillermo Cañas / David Nalbandian; Igor Kunitsyn / Dmitry Tursunov	2; 6	1; 6	7^{11} 6^{9}	6; 3	6; 8
4	(Argentina) (Russia)	David Nalbandian; Nikolay Davydenko	6; 3	3; 6	6^{2} 7^{7}	0; 6
5	(Argentina) (Russia)	Juan Martín del Potro; Igor Andreev	6; 4	6; 2	6; 1

=== Spain vs. United States ===
Spain
4
Plaza de Toros de Las Ventas, Madrid, Spain
19-21 September 2008
Clay

United States
1

			1	2	3	4	5
1	(Spain) (United States)	Rafael Nadal; Sam Querrey	6^{5} 7^{7}	6; 4	6; 3	6; 4
2	(Spain) (United States)	David Ferrer; Andy Roddick	7^{7} 6^{5}	2; 6	1; 6	6; 4	8; 6
3	(Spain) (United States)	Feliciano López / Fernando Verdasco; Mike Bryan / Mardy Fish	6; 4	4; 6	3; 6	6; 4	4; 6
4	(Spain) (United States)	Rafael Nadal; Andy Roddick	6; 4	6; 0	6; 4
5	(Spain) (United States)	Feliciano López; Sam Querrey	7^{7} 6^{3}	7^{7} 6^{4}

== Final ==
=== Argentina vs. Spain ===
Argentina
1
Estadio Polideportivo, Mar del Plata, Argentina
21-23 November 2008
Hard (i)

Spain
3

			1	2	3	4	5
1	(Argentina) (Spain)	David Nalbandian; David Ferrer	6; 3	6; 2	6; 3
2	(Argentina) (Spain)	Juan Martín del Potro; Feliciano López	6; 4	6^{2} 7^{7}	6^{4} 7^{7}	3; 6
3	(Argentina) (Spain)	Agustín Calleri / David Nalbandian; Feliciano López / Fernando Verdasco	7; 5	5; 7	6^{5} 7^{7}	3; 6
4	(Argentina) (Spain)	José Acasuso; Fernando Verdasco	3; 6	7^{7} 6^{3}	6; 4	3; 6	1; 6
5	(Argentina) (Spain)	David Nalbandian; Feliciano López						not played
